= Football at the 2009 Mediterranean Games – Men's team squads =

Below are the squads for the Football at the 2009 Mediterranean Games, hosted in Pescara, Italy, and took place between 25 June and 5 July 2009. Teams were national U-20 sides.

== Group A ==
=== Italy ===
Head coach: Francesco Rocca

No.	Pos.	Player	Date of birth (age)	Caps	Club
1	GK	Vincenzo Fiorillo	13 January 1990 (aged 19)		(Italy) Sampdoria
2	DF	Francesco Bini	2 January 1989 (aged 20)		(Italy) Piacenza
3	DF	Marco Calderoni	18 February 1989 (aged 20)		(Italy) Piacenza
4	DF	Michelangelo Albertazzi	7 January 1991 (aged 18)		(Italy) Milan
5	DF	Massimiliano Tagliani (c)	4 April 1989 (aged 20)		(Italy) Fiorentina
6	MF	Andrea Mazzarani	6 November 1989 (aged 19)		(Italy) Udinese
7	MF	Mattia Mustacchio	17 May 1989 (aged 20)		(Italy) Sampdoria
8	MF	Silvano Raggio Garibaldi	27 March 1989 (aged 20)		(Italy) Pisa
9	FW	Ettore Mendicino	11 February 1990 (aged 19)		(Italy) Lazio
10	FW	Armando Visconti	26 October 1989 (aged 19)		(Italy) Avellino
11	MF	Giacomo Bonaventura	22 August 1989 (aged 19)		(Italy) Pergocrema
12	GK	Andrea Gasparri	28 February 1989 (aged 20)		(Italy) Parma
13	DF	Alessandro Crescenzi	25 September 1991 (aged 17)		(Italy) Roma
14	DF	Matteo Darmian	2 December 1989 (aged 19)		(Italy) Milan
15	MF	Claudio Della Penna	12 May 1989 (aged 20)		(Italy) Pistoiese
16	MF	Francesco Di Tacchio	20 April 1990 (aged 19)		(Italy) Ascoli
17	MF	Fabio Sciacca	16 May 1989 (aged 20)		(Italy) Catania
18	FW	Ciro Immobile	20 February 1990 (aged 19)		(Italy) Juventus

== Group B ==
=== France ===
Head coach: Luc Rabat

No.	Pos.	Player	Date of birth (age)	Caps	Club
1	GK	Matthieu Dreyer	20 March 1989 (aged 20)		(France) Sochaux
2	DF	Jean-Christophe Coubronne	30 July 1989 (aged 19)		(France) Sochaux
3	DF	Kévin Théophile-Catherine	28 October 1989 (aged 19)		(France) Rennes
4	MF	Yoric Ravet	12 September 1989 (aged 19)		(France) Grenoble
5	DF	Samuel Souprayen	18 February 1989 (aged 20)		(France) Rennes
6	MF	Morgan Schneiderlin (c)	8 November 1989 (aged 19)		(England) Southampton
7	MF	Jérémy Pied	23 February 1989 (aged 20)		(France) Lyon
8	MF	Diallo Guidileye	30 December 1989 (aged 19)		(France) Troyes
9	FW	Dominique Malonga	8 January 1989 (aged 20)		(Italy) Foggia
10	FW	Djamel Bakar	6 April 1989 (aged 20)		(France) Monaco
11	MF	Franck Tabanou	30 January 1989 (aged 20)		(France) Toulouse
12	DF	Lamine Koné	1 February 1989 (aged 20)		(France) Châteauroux
13	FW	Fabien Robert	6 January 1989 (aged 20)		(France) Lorient
14	MF	Sony Mustivar	12 February 1990 (aged 19)		(France) Bastia
15	MF	Yohann Lasimant	4 September 1989 (aged 19)		(France) Rennes
16	GK	Willy Maeyens	5 June 1989 (aged 20)		(France) Auxerre
17	DF	Loïc Abenzoar	14 February 1989 (aged 20)		(France) Lyon
18	FW	Steeven Joseph-Monrose	20 July 1990 (aged 18)		(France) Lens

== Group C ==
=== Montenegro ===
Head coach: Dušan Vlaisavljević

No.	Pos.	Player	Date of birth (age)	Caps	Goals	Club
1	GK	Jasmin Agović	13 February 1991 (aged 18)	0	0	(Montenegro) Budućnost Podgrica
2	DF	Mihailo Aleksić	12 February 1990 (aged 19)	0	0	(Serbia) Sinđelić Niš
3	DF	Danilo Vuković	1 April 1989 (aged 20)	2	0	(Montenegro) Sutjeska Nikšić
4	DF	Stefan Savić	8 January 1991 (aged 18)	2	0	(Serbia) BSK Borča
5	MF	Nikola Vukčević	21 November 1989 (aged 19)	2	0	(Montenegro) Mladost Podgorica
6	DF	Predrag Kašćelan	30 June 1990 (aged 18)	2	0	(Serbia) Spartak Zlatibor Voda
7	MF	Asmir Kajević	15 February 1990 (aged 19)	2	0	(Serbia) BSK Borča
8	MF	Mirko Durutović	13 March 1989 (aged 20)	2	0	(Montenegro) Sutjeska Nikšić
9	FW	Bogdan Bogdanović	5 March 1989 (aged 20)	2	0	(Serbia) Hajduk Beograd
10	MF	Ivan Novović	26 April 1989 (aged 20)	2	0	(Montenegro) FK Zeta
11	MF	Dino Bećirović	14 December 1989 (aged 19)	1	0	(Montenegro) FK Jedinstvo
12	GK	Miloš Dragojević	3 February 1989 (aged 20)	2	0	(Montenegro) Budućnost Podgrica
13	DF	Miloš Radulović	6 August 1990 (aged 18)	2	0	(Montenegro) FK Zeta
14	DF	Vuk Martinović	19 September 1989 (aged 19)	2	0	(Montenegro) FK Grbalj
15	MF	Velimir Kaluđerović	4 February 1989 (aged 20)	1	0	(Montenegro) FK Dečić
16	FW	Ermin Seratlić	21 August 1990 (aged 18)	2	0	(Montenegro) Mladost Podgorica
17	FW	Pavle Nerić	3 May 1990 (aged 19)	1	0	(Montenegro) Sutjeska Nikšić
18	FW	Igor Kostić		1	0	(Serbia) Sinđelić Niš

== Group D ==
=== Albania ===
Head coach: Artan Bushati

No.	Pos.	Player	Date of birth (age)	Caps	Goals	Club
1	GK	Shpëtim Moçka	20 October 1989 (aged 19)	2	0	(Albania) Flamurtari Vlorë
12	GK	Ibrahim Bejte	15 September 1989 (aged 19)	0	0	(Albania) Lushnja
4	DF	Klodian Samina	19 January 1989 (aged 20)	2	0	(Bulgaria) Belasitsa Petrich
2	DF	Indrit Hithi	5 February 1990 (aged 19)	2	0	(Albania) Partizani Tirana
3	DF	Ditmar Bicaj	26 February 1989 (aged 20)	1	0	(Bulgaria) Belasitsa Petrich
13	DF	Renato Malota (Captain)	24 June 1989 (aged 20)	2	0	(Albania) Partizani Tirana
11	DF	Arsen Sykaj	11 April 1990 (aged 19)	1	0	(Albania) Vllaznia Shkodër
7	MF	Sokol Cikalleshi	27 July 1990 (aged 18)	2	0	(Albania) Besa Kavajë
5	MF	Ganiol Kaçuli	22 September 1989 (aged 19)	2	0	(Albania) Elbasani
18	MF	Orgest Gava	29 March 1990 (aged 19)	2	0	(Albania) Elbasani
14	MF	Erjon Vuçaj	25 December 1990 (aged 18)	2	0	(Albania) Vllaznia Shkodër
8	MF	Sabien Lilaj	10 February 1989 (aged 20)	2	0	(Albania) Skënderbeu Korçë
6	MF	Elham Galica	30 January 1989 (aged 20)	0	0	(Albania) Flamurtari Vlorë
16	MF	Orjan Xhemalaj	7 June 1989 (aged 20)	0	0	(Albania) Teuta Durrës
17	FW	Bekim Balaj	11 January 1991 (aged 18)	0	0	(Albania) Vllaznia Shkodër
10	FW	Vilfor Hysa	9 September 1989 (aged 19)	2	0	(Albania) Teuta Durrës
9	FW	Ardit Shehaj	23 September 1990 (aged 18)	2	1	(Albania) Flamurtari Vlorë
15	FW	Alban Dashi	25 September 1989 (aged 19)	2	0	(Albania) Partizani Tirana

=== Spain ===
Head coach: Luis Milla

No.	Pos.	Player	Date of birth (age)	Caps	Goals	Club
1	GK	Tomás Mejías	30 January 1989 (aged 20)	1	0	(Spain) Real Madrid
2	DF	Manuel Castellano 'Lillo'	27 March 1989 (aged 20)	2	0	(Spain) Real Murcia
3	DF	José Ángel Valdés	5 September 1989 (aged 19)	1	0	(Spain) Sporting Gijón
4	DF	Alberto Botía	27 January 1989 (aged 20)	1	0	(Spain) FC Barcelona
5	DF	Pedro Alcalá	19 March 1989 (aged 20)	2	0	(Spain) UD Marbella
6	DF	Andreu Fontàs	14 November 1989 (aged 19)	2	0	(Spain) FC Barcelona
7	FW	Aarón Ñíguez	26 April 1989 (aged 20)	2	1	(Scotland) Rangers FC
8	MF	Eduardo Bedia	23 March 1989 (aged 20)	1	0	(Spain) Racing Santander
9	FW	Iván Bolado	3 July 1989 (aged 19)	2	1	(Spain) Elche CF
10	MF	Ander Herrera	14 September 1989 (aged 19)	2	0	(Spain) Real Zaragoza
11	MF	Jordi Alba	21 March 1989 (aged 20)	2	0	(Spain) Gimnàstic Tarragona
12	DF	Víctor Laguardia	5 November 1989 (aged 19)	1	0	(Spain) Real Zaragoza
13	GK	Tomeu Nadal	8 February 1989 (aged 20)	0	0	(Spain) RCD Mallorca
14	DF	Dídac Vilà	9 June 1989 (aged 20)	1	0	(Spain) RCD Espanyol
15	MF	Marcos Gullón	20 February 1989 (aged 20)	0	0	(Spain) Villarreal CF
16	MF	Dani Parejo	16 April 1989 (aged 20)	2	0	(Spain) Real Madrid
17	FW	Enrique García 'Kike'	25 November 1989 (aged 19)	0	0	(Spain) Real Murcia
18	FW	Emilio Nsue	30 September 1989 (aged 19)	2	0	(Spain) CD Castellón
