= Albania national under-20 football team =

National U-20 association football team

Albania Under-20
- Nickname(s): Kuq e Zinjtë (The Red and Blacks); Shqiponjat (The Eagles)
- Association: Federata Shqiptare e Futbollit (FSHF)
- Confederation: UEFA
- Head coach: Ilias Haxhiraj
- Captain: Elmir Lekaj
- Most caps: Amir Rrahmani (5); Aldo Teqja; Marvin Turtulli; Klaudio Hyseni; Ilir Kastrati; Enis Gavazaj; Maldin Ymeraj; Valon Ahmedi; Erion Hoxhallari; Arben Muskaj
- Top scorer: Ardit Shehaj (1); Amir Rrahmani; Marvin Turtulli; Klaudio Hyseni; Ilir Kastrati; Klodian Gino
- Home stadium: Elbasan Arena; Loro Boriçi Stadium
- FIFA code: ALB
First colours	Second colours	Third colours

The Albania national under-20 football team is the national under-20 football team of Albania and is controlled by the Football Association of Albania.

The under-20 squad is often cited as a feeder squad to the under-21 squad. Most of the player picked for this team are U-21 internationals already.

Because there is no under-20 competition at UEFA level, Albania's under-20 side has generally only competed when it has qualified for the FIFA U-20 World Cup, which is held every 2 years. Qualification for this competition is achieved in view of performance at the preceding summer's UEFA European Under-19 Football Championship.

Albania have never played a game with the U-20 squad and the team was only formed after an invitation to play in 2009 Mediterranean Games in Pescara, Italy. Then Albania under-20 participated in the next tournament 2013 Mediterranean Games in Mersin, Turkey.

In 2017 the Albanian Football Association decided to "reborn" the under-20 side by assigning a Friendly match against Georgia under-20 side on 14 November 2017 at David Petriashvili Stadium in Tbilisi, Georgia.

== History ==
=== 2009 Mediterranean Games ===
==== Group D ====
Team	Pld	W	D	L	GF	GA	GD	Pts
Spain	2	1	1	0	5	2	+3	4
Tunisia	2	1	1	0	4	3	+1	4
Albania	2	0	0	2	1	5	-4	0

27 June 2009 2009 Mediterranean Games	Albania	1 – 2	Tunisia	Pescara, Italy
17:00 CET	Shehaj 23'	Report	Ben Messaoud 27'; Ayari 35'	Stadium: Stadio Valle Anzuca, Francavilla al Mare; Referee: Fırat Aydınus (Turkey)

29 June 2009 2009 Mediterranean Games	Spain	3 – 0	Albania	Pescara, Italy
17:00 CET	Kike 11'; Aarón 12'; Botía 77'	Report		Stadium: Stadio Valle Anzuca, Francavilla al Mare; Referee: Nikola Dabanović (Montenegro)

==== Squad ====
The following players were called up and participated in the 2009 Mediterranean Games football tournament, which began on 25 June in Pescara, Italy.

COACH: Artan Bushati

No.	Pos.	Player	Date of birth (age)	Caps	Goals	Club
1	GK	Shpëtim Moçka	20 October 1989 (aged 19)	2	0	(Albanian Football Federation) Flamurtari Vlorë
12	GK	Ibrahim Bejte	15 September 1989 (aged 19)	0	0	(Albanian Football Federation) Lushnja
4	DF	Klodian Samina	19 January 1989 (aged 20)	2	0	(Bulgarian Football Union) Belasitsa Petrich
2	DF	Indrit Hithi	5 February 1990 (aged 19)	2	0	(Albanian Football Federation) Partizani Tirana
3	DF	Ditmar Bicaj	26 February 1989 (aged 20)	1	0	(Bulgarian Football Union) Belasitsa Petrich
13	DF	Renato Malota (Captain)	24 June 1989 (aged 20)	2	0	(Albanian Football Federation) Partizani Tirana
11	DF	Arsen Sykaj	11 April 1990 (aged 19)	1	0	(Albanian Football Federation) Vllaznia Shkodër
7	MF	Sokol Cikalleshi	27 July 1990 (aged 18)	2	0	(Albanian Football Federation) Besa Kavajë
5	MF	Ganiol Kaçuli	22 September 1989 (aged 19)	2	0	(Albanian Football Federation) Elbasani
18	MF	Orgest Gava	29 March 1990 (aged 19)	2	0	(Albanian Football Federation) Elbasani
14	MF	Erjon Vuçaj	25 December 1990 (aged 18)	2	0	(Albanian Football Federation) Vllaznia Shkodër
8	MF	Sabien Lilaj	10 February 1989 (aged 20)	2	0	(Albanian Football Federation) Skënderbeu Korçë
6	MF	Elham Galica	30 January 1989 (aged 20)	0	0	(Albanian Football Federation) Flamurtari Vlorë
16	MF	Orjan Xhemalaj	7 June 1989 (aged 20)	0	0	(Albanian Football Federation) Teuta Durrës
17	FW	Bekim Balaj	11 January 1991 (aged 18)	0	0	(Albanian Football Federation) Vllaznia Shkodër
10	FW	Vilfor Hysa	9 September 1989 (aged 19)	2	0	(Albanian Football Federation) Teuta Durrës
9	FW	Ardit Shehaj	23 September 1990 (aged 18)	2	1	(Albanian Football Federation) Flamurtari Vlorë
15	FW	Alban Dashi	25 September 1989 (aged 19)	2	0	(Albanian Football Federation) Partizani Tirana

=== 2013 Mediterranean Games ===
==== Preliminary round - Group A ====
Team	Pld	W	D	L	GF	GA	GD	Pts
Morocco	3	3	0	0	7	2	+5	9
Turkey	3	2	0	1	8	4	+4	6
Albania	3	0	1	2	3	6	−3	1
Bosnia and Herzegovina	3	0	1	2	4	10	−6	1

19 June 2013 2013 Mediterranean Games	Turkey	2–0	Albania	Mersin, Turkey
21:45 CET	Aydın 10'; Sazdağı 86'	Report		Stadium: Tevfik Sırrı Gür Stadium; Referee: Andrea De Marco (Italy)

21 June 2013 2013 Mediterranean Games	Albania	2–2	Bosnia and Herzegovina	Mersin, Turkey
18:00 CET	Turtulli 61'; Rrahmani 73'	Report	Bajić 44' 52'	Stadium: Tarsus Şehir Stadı, Tarsus; Referee: Baris Simsek (Turkey)

23 June 2013 2013 Mediterranean Games	Morocco	2–1	Albania	Mersin, Turkey
21:45 CET	Khaloua 33' (pen.); El Hassouni 58'	Report	Gino 47'	Stadium: Tevfik Sırrı Gür Stadium; Referee: Alain Bieri (Switzerland)

==== Classification stage - 5–8 matches ====
25 June 2013 2013 Mediterranean Games	Albania	1–2 (a.e.t.)	North Macedonia	Mersin, Turkey
21:00 CET	Kastrati 85' (pen.)	Report	Kostovski 50'; Imeri 6' (extra time)	Stadium: Tevfik Sırrı Gür Stadium; Referee: Nikola Popov (Bulgaria)

==== Classification stage - 7th place match ====
26 June 2013 2013 Mediterranean Games	Albania	1–3	Italy	Mersin, Turkey
18:00 CET	Hyseni 82'	Report	Canotto 20'; Bollino 47'; Gomez 54' (pen.)	Stadium: Tarsus Şehir Stadı, Tarsus; Referee: Khalid Ennouni (Morocco)

== Players ==
=== Current squad ===
- The following players were called up for the friendly match.
- Match date: 12 June 2021
- Opposition: Montenegro

No.	Pos.	Player	Date of birth (age)	Caps	Goals	Club
1	GK	Leonard Kacaj	19 March 2003 (age 23)	0	0	(Albanian Football Federation) Vllaznia Pozheran
12	GK	Simon Simoni	14 July 2004 (age 22)	1	0	(Albanian Football Federation) Shënkolli
23	GK	Mario Mara	29 January 2002 (age 24)	1	0	(Albanian Football Federation) Erzeni
2	DF	Usni Ismaili	13 March 2002 (age 24)	0	0	
3	DF	Omar Musaj	15 April 2002 (age 24)	1	0	(Albanian Football Federation) Tirana
4	DF	Kesli Shani	16 December 2002 (age 23)	1	0	(Croatian Football Federation) Lokomotiva Zagreb
5	DF	Mikel Nuhaj	1 April 2002 (age 24)	1	0	(Royal Dutch Football Association) Roda JC
6	DF	Petro Memushi	15 January 2002 (age 24)	1	0	(Italian Football Federation) Arezzo
11	DF	Geralb Smajli	16 May 2002 (age 24)	1	0	(Albanian Football Federation) Vllaznia Pozheran
13	DF	Reild Kurti	17 October 2002 (age 24)	1	0	(Albanian Football Federation) Korabi Debar
14	DF	Ergi Goga	25 October 2002 (age 24)	1	0	(Albanian Football Federation) Akademia e Futbollit
21	DF	Klaudio Bardhi	8 April 2002 (age 24)	1	0	(Albanian Football Federation) Akademia e Futbollit
22	DF	Arsen Elbasani	28 February 2002 (age 24)	1	0	(Albanian Football Federation) Vllaznia Pozheran
7	MF	Flamur Ruçi	19 January 2002 (age 24)	0	0	(Albanian Football Federation) Bylis
9	MF	Rubin Zijaj	11 March 2002 (age 24)	1	0	(Albanian Football Federation) Apolonia Fier
10	MF	Xheron Osma	20 August 2003 (age 23)	1	0	(Albanian Football Federation) Kukësi
15	MF	Albnor Kaba	24 November 2002 (age 23)	1	0	(Football Federation of Macedonia) Shkëndija
8	FW	Aldi Gjumsi	15 March 2002 (age 24)	1	0	(Albanian Football Federation) Tirana

=== Recent call-ups ===
The following players have been called up for Albania U20 squad within the past 12 months.

Pos.	Player	Date of birth (age)	Caps	Goals	Club	Latest call-up

Notes

- ^{INJ} Withdrew due to injury
- ^{PRE} Preliminary squad / standby
- ^{RET} Retired from international football
- ^{SUS} Suspended from national team

=== Coaching staff ===
Current coaching staff:

Position	Name
Head coach	(Albania) Ilir Biturku
Assistant coach	(Albania) Arjan Bellaj
Goalkeeping coach	(Albania) Alfred Osmani
Athletic coach	(Albania) Iris Selimi
Team doctor	(Albania) Erald Derveni
Physiotherapists	(Albania) Gledi Rexha
Physiotherapists	(Albania) Edison Koçi
Base materials	(Albania) Roland Rarani

== Tournament history ==
=== FIFA U-20 World Cup ===
Year	Round	GP	W	D*	L	GS	GA
(Tunisia) 1977	did not qualify						
(Japan) 1979	did not qualify						
(Australia) 1981	did not qualify						
(Mexico) 1983	did not qualify						
(Soviet Union) 1985	did not qualify						
(Chile) 1987	did not qualify						
(Saudi Arabia) 1989	did not qualify						
(Portugal) 1991	did not qualify						
(Australia) 1993	did not qualify						
(Qatar) 1995	did not qualify						
(Malaysia) 1997	did not qualify						
(Nigeria) 1999	did not qualify						
(Argentina) 2001	did not qualify						
(United Arab Emirates) 2003	did not qualify						
(Netherlands) 2005	did not qualify						
(Canada) 2007	did not qualify						
(Egypt) 2009	did not qualify						
(Colombia) 2011	did not qualify						
(Turkey) 2013	did not qualify						
(New Zealand) 2015	did not qualify						
(South Korea) 2017	did not qualify						
(Poland) 2019	did not qualify						
(Indonesia) 2021	Cancelled						
(Argentina) 2023	did not qualify						
(Chile) 2025	did not qualify						
(Azerbaijan) (Uzbekistan) 2027	To be determined						
Total	0/25	0	0	0	0	0	0

=== Mediterranean Games - Football ===
Football at the Mediterranean Games record
Year	Round	Position	GP	W	D	L	GS	GA
(Italy) 2009	Group stage	10th	2	0	0	2	1	5
(Turkey) 2013	Group stage	8th	5	0	1	4	5	11
Total	0/2	Best: 8th	7	0	1	6	6	16

== See also ==
- Albania national football team
- Albania national under-23 football team
- Albania national under-21 football team
- Albania national under-19 football team
- Albania national under-18 football team
- Albania national under-17 football team
- Albania national under-16 football team
- Albania national under-15 football team
- Albania national football team results
- Albania national youth football team
- Albanian Superliga
- Football in Albania
- List of Albania international footballers
