= Ilir (name) =

- Gender: Male
- Language: Albanian

Origin
- Meaning: Free, Illyrian
- Region of origin: Albania, Kosovo, North Macedonia

Other names
- Related names: Ilirjan

Ilir is an Albanian masculine given name, derived from i lirë, which means "illyrian" and "being free" in the Albanian language. It is also the Albanian way of referring to an "Illyrian" male.

People bearing the name include:

- Ilir Alliu (born 1973), Albanian footballer
- Ilir Avdyli (born 1990), Kosovar footballer
- Ilir Azemi (born 1992), Kosovar footballer
- Ilir Bajri (born 1969), Kosovar jazz composer, pianist
- Ilir Bano (born 1951), Albanian politician
- Ilir Beqaj (born 1968), Albanian politician
- Ilir Berisha (born 1991), Kosovar footballer
- Ilir Biturku (born 1968), Albanian footballer
- Ilir Blakçori (born 1993), Kosovar professional footballer
- Ilir Boçka (born 1950), Albanian diplomat
- Ilir Bozhiqi (born 1965), Albanian footballer
- Ilirjan Çaushaj (born 1987), Albanian footballer
- Ilir Dabjani (born 2001), Albanian footballer
- Ilir Daja (born 1966), Albanian footballer
- Ilir Dibra (born 1977), Albanian footballer
- Ilir Duro (born 1966), Albanian footballer
- Ilir Elmazovski (born 1979), Macedonian footballer
- Ilir Gjoni (born 1962), Albanian politician
- Ilir Hasani, Albanian traumatologist
- Ilir Hoti (1957–2016), Albanian economist and university teacher
- Ilir Hoxha (born 1949), son of former Albanian leader Enver Hoxha
- Ilir Ikonomi (born 1954), Albanian—American journalist and author
- Ilir Jaçellari (born 1970), Albanian actor, painter and photographer
- Ilir Kadia (born 1957), Albanian journalist
- Ilir Kastrati (born 1994), Albanian association football player
- Ilir Kepa (born 1966), Albanian footballer
- Ilir Kerni (born 1959), Albanian ballet dancer, opera and theater director
- Ilir Krasniqi (born 2000), Kosovan footballer
- Ilir Lame (born 1956), Albanian footballer
- Ilir Latifi (born 1983), Swedish-Albanian mixed martial artist
- Ilir Luarasi (1954–2018), Albanian footballer
- Ilir Meta (born 1969), Albanian politician, Prime Minister of Albania from 1999 to 2002, President from 2017 to 2022
- Ilir Nallbani (born 1982), Kosovar footballer
- Ilir Përnaska (born 1951), Albanian footballer
- Ilir Qela (born 2001), German footballer
- Ilir Qorri (born 1975), Albanian footballer
- Ilir Rexhepi (born 1973), Kosovar actor
- Ilir Rusmali (born 1965), Albanian politician
- Ilir Selmani (born 1978), Kosovar basketball player
- Ilir Seitaj (born 1957), Albanian chess International Master
- Ilir Shulku (born 1969), Albanian footballer
- Ilir Zeneli (born 1984), Finnish football manager
