= Klodian =

- Gender: Male
- Language: Albanian

Origin
- Meaning: a person from Klondiara
- Region of origin: Albania

Other names
- Related names: feminine: Klodiana

Klodian is an Albanian male given name. It is a topographic name, meaning a person from the ancient Roman city of Klodiana, called Claudiana in English, which is now Peqin, Albania. The feminine form is Klodiana. The name may refer to:

- Klodian Asllani (born 1977), Albanian footballer
- Klodian Arbëri (born 1979), Albanian footballer
- Klodian Duro (born 1977), Albanian footballer
- Klodian Gino (born 1994), Albanian footballer
- Klodian Melani (born 1986), Albanian footballer
- Klodian Nuri (born 1995), Albanian footballer
- Klodian Samina (born 1989), Albanian footballer
- Klodiana Shala (born 1979), Albanian athlete
- Klodian Skënderi (born 1984), Albanian footballer
- Klodian Sulollari (born 1989), Albanian footballer
- Klodian Xhelilaj (born 1988), Albanian footballer
