= Shpëtim Moçka =

Albanian footballer (born 1989)

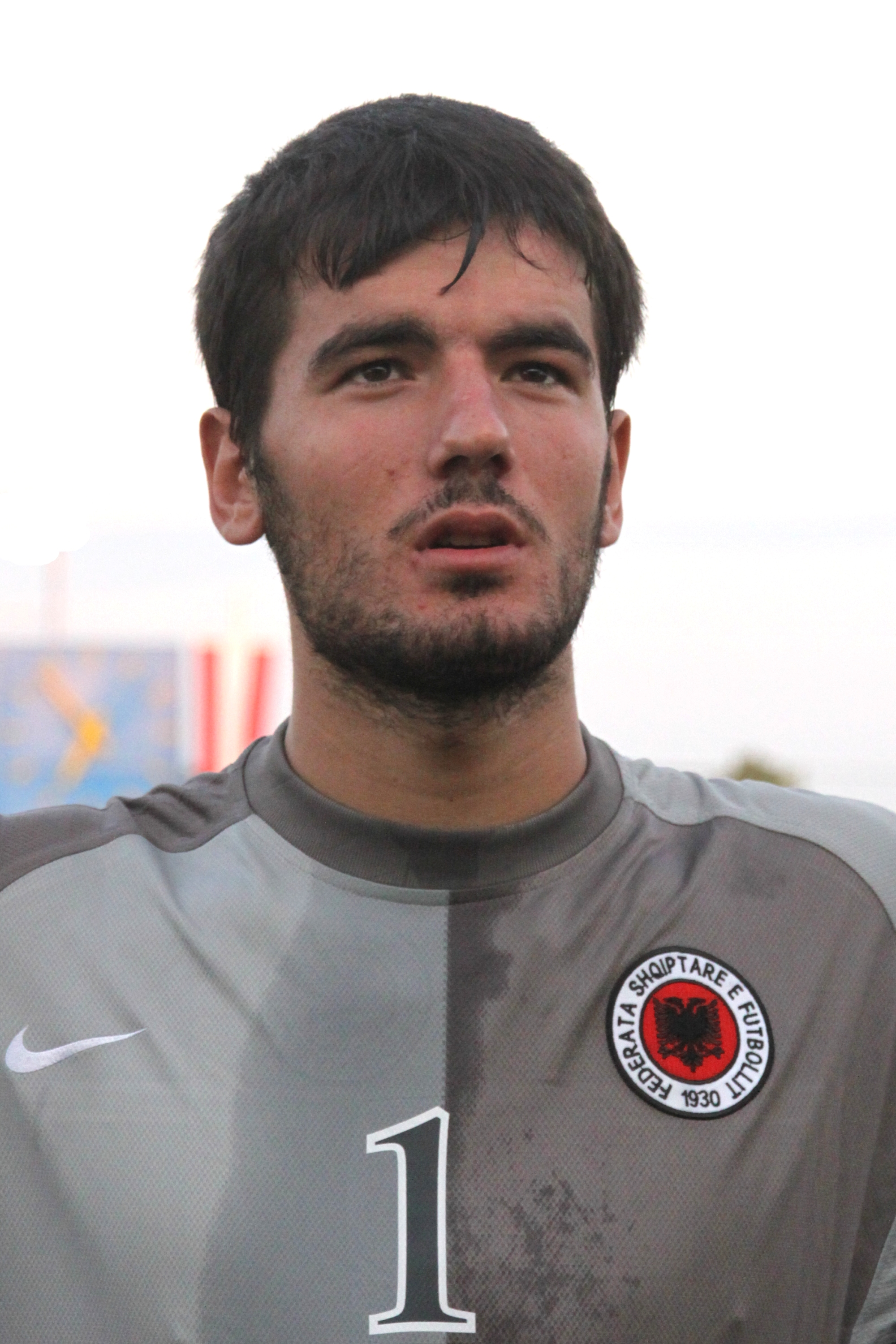
- Moçka with Albania U21 in 2009

Personal information
- Date of birth: 20 October 1989 (age 37)
- Place of birth: Vlorë, Albania
- Height: 1.91 m (6 ft 3 in)
- Position: Goalkeeper

Youth career
- 2000–2007: Flamurtari Vlorë

Senior career*
Years	Team	Apps	(Gls)
2007–2011	Flamurtari Vlorë	106	(1)
2011–2012	Apolonia Fier	9	(0)
2012–2013	Kastrioti Krujë	19	(1)
2013–2014	Flamurtari Vlorë	24	(0)
2014–2015	Mamurrasi	3	(0)
2015	Laçi	3	(0)
2015–2018	Teuta Durrës	70	(1)
2018	Tirana	0	(0)
2019	Bylis Ballsh	0	(0)
2019–2022	Flamurtari Vlorë	54	(0)

International career
2007–2010	Albania U21	7	(0)
2009	Albania U20	2	(0)
- * Club domestic league appearances and goals as of 30 October 2022

Shpëtim Moçka (born 20 October 1989) is an Albanian professional footballer who plays as a goalkeeper.

== Club career ==
=== Flamurtari Vlorë ===
Moçka was promoted to the Flamurtari first team from the U-19s by Eqerem Memushi before the start of the 2007–08 season at the age of just 17 following the departures of Estref Billa and Erjon Dine.

His first league game in a red and black shirt came in round 5 of the Albanian Superliga against Dinamo Tirana on 28 September 2007. Moçka played well to keep a clean sheet against prolific strikers such as Sebino Plaku and Pero Pejic which helped his team win the game away from home 1–0 against a strong Dinamo side. During his first three games the young goalkeeper managed three clean sheets against Dinamo Tirana, Partizani Tirana and Shkumbini Peqin

=== Apolonia Fier ===
After falling out of favour with the coach Shkëlqim Muça, Moçka was loaned out to fellow Albanian Superliga side Apolonia Fier for the remainder of the 2011–12 season on 27 February 2012.

=== Kastrioti Krujë ===
Following his loan return to Flamurtari Vlorë from Apolonia Fier, on 25 July 2012 he signed for Kastrioti Krujë. He became the club's first choice goalkeeper for the 2012–13 campaign ahead of Alfred Osmani, and he made 19 league appearances, as well as scoring a goal from the penalty spot in a 4–1 win over his previous club Apolonia. He also made four Albanian Cup appearances to help his side reach the quarter-finals.

=== Return at Flamurtari Vlorë ===
Moçka returned to his first club Flamurtari Vlorë ahead of the 2013–14 season and following the departure of Enea Koliqi to Iraklis he became the club's first choice goalkeeper ahead of Klodian Xhelilaj. He played in 24 league games in a season where the club struggled in the Albanian Superliga and only managed to finish 7th in the league. He also made five cup appearances in a successful cup winning campaign, but he was overlooked for the final against Kukësi as the manager Ernest Gjoka decided to choose Klodian Xhelilaj instead.

=== Teuta Durrës ===
In August 2015, Moçka signed for one season with Teuta Durrës for an undisclosed fee, and was given number 12 for the 2015–16 season. He started his Teuta career initially as a backup for veteran and captain Bledjan Rizvani, and made his debut on 26 September by replacing an injured Rizvani in the 33rd minute against Tirana as the match was lost 2–0 at Qemal Stafa Stadium. Following that, he went on to play as starter for the remaining of the season, making 30 appearances in league, keeping 15 clean sheets as Teuta finished 4th to clinch a place at 2016–17 UEFA Europa League first qualifying round.

Moçka played as starter in both matches as Teuta was crashed 0–6 on aggregate by Kairat. He retained his spot in the first part of 2016–17 season, notably keeping seven clean sheets. In the second part of the season, with the arrival of Elhan Kastrati, Moçka spent his time between the goal and bench, and finished the season with 26 appearances, including 23 in league, as Teuta narrowly retained their top flight spot for only one point.

Moçka extended his contract with the club for another year in the summer of 2017. He lost his place in the lineup to Kastrati in the first part of the season, being the starting keeper only in cup matches and making only three league appearances. Later on 4 March 2018, during the league encounter versus Partizani Tirana, Moçka scored a 95th-minute equaliser with a header to equal the score 1–1. It was his third career goal, and was "the most special" according to him.

Moçka left Teuta in July 2018, concluding his spell by playing 85 matches in all competitions.

=== Tirana ===
On 14 August 2018, Tirana completed the transfer of Moçka on a one-year contract as a free agent. His spell with the capital side was disappointing, as he was seen as the third choice in the eyes of coach Zé Maria and later Ardian Mema, playing only in both legs of Albanian Cup first round tie against Iliria. He left the club during the winter transfer window in January 2019.

=== Bylis Ballsh ===
On 29 January 2019, Moçka was presented as the new player of Bylis Ballsh, returning in Albanian First Division after five years. He signed a contract until the end of the season with an option to extend it for another year.

=== Second return at Flamurtari Vlorë ===
In August 2019, Moçka accepted an offer from his boyhood club Flamurtari, returning in Vlorë for the first time in five years. He was given squad number 1 and captain's armband for the 2019–20 season. He commenced the season on 24 August by playing in the 1–0 away loss to Skënderbeu Korçë in matchday 1 of Albanian Superliga.

== International career ==
=== Youth ===
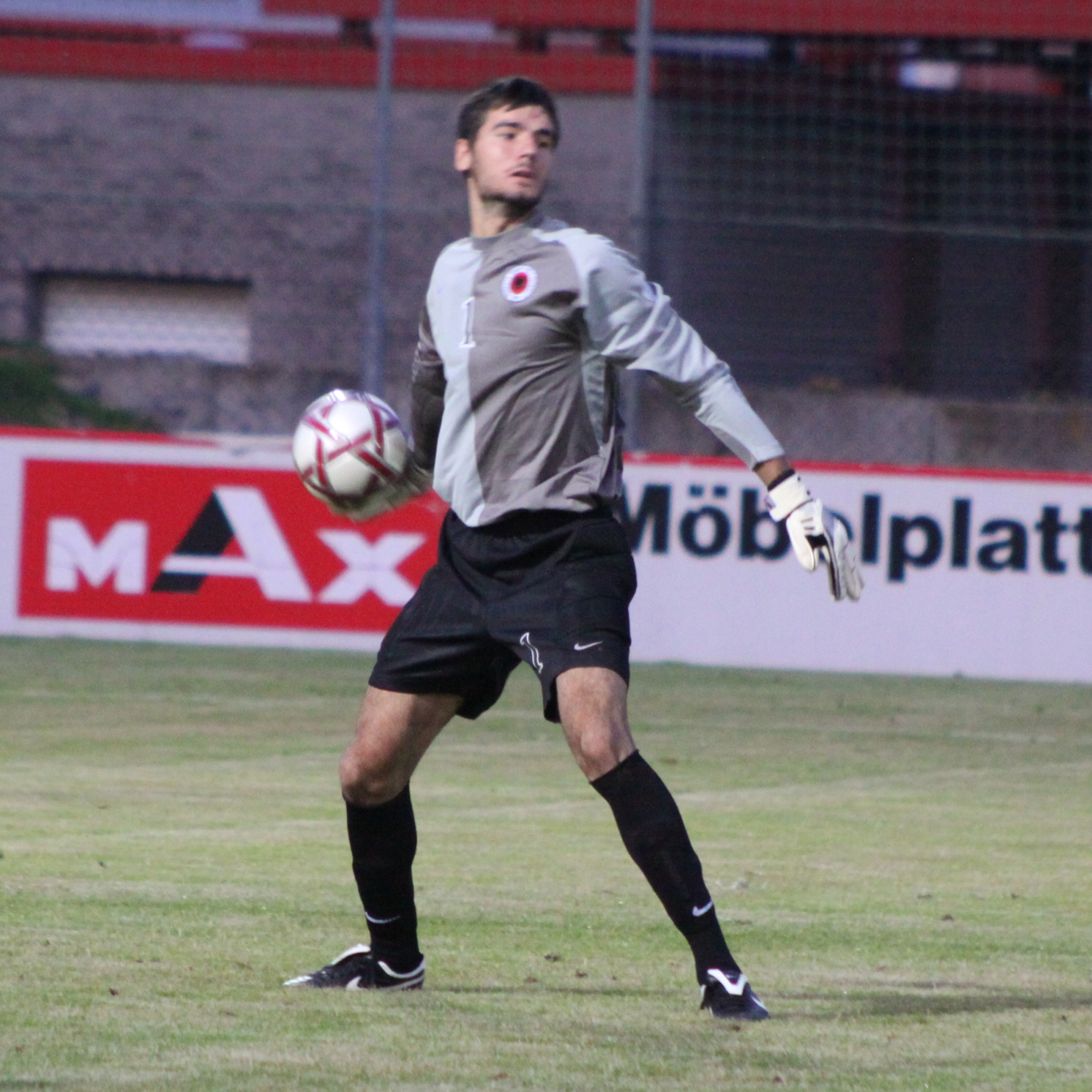
Moçka in action against Austria on 9 September 2009.

Moçka was regularly called to the Albania under-21 team by then coach Artan Bushati for the qualifying phrase of 2011 UEFA European Under-21 Championship where Albania was placed in the Group 10. He established himself as the starting goalkeeper by playing six out of eight matches throughout the campaign. He made his competitive debut on 28 March 2009 in the 0–1 home defeat to Scotland, as Albania started the qualifiers with a loss. Moçka kept his first clean sheet with the under-21 side on 5 September 2009 in the matchday 3 against Azerbaijan, helping the team to win 1–0 for the first three points of the Group 10.

Following the 3–1 away defeat to Austria in the matchday 4, Moçka was benched in favour of Ibrahim Bejte for the clash against Belarus, which finished in a 4–2 away defeat. He returned to the goal for the next match against Austria on 13 November, where he helped the team to grab a point after a 2–2 draw at Qemal Stafa Stadium. He was dropped again in the bench for the penultimate match against Belarus, which ended in a 2–1 home defeat, but returned in Albania's 2–1 defeat to Azerbaijan in the last qualifying match. Albania finished the Group 10 in the penultimate spot with four points.

=== Senior ===
On 17 February 2010, Moçka played his first match with senior side, an unofficial friendly against Kosovo, where entered as a substitute for Ilion Lika in an eventually 2–3 win. Two years later, he was called up again by the new coach Gianni De Biasi for the friendlies against Qatar and Iran, but he remained on the bench for both matches, won by Albania.

== Career statistics ==
As of 1 September 2019

Appearances and goals by club, season and competition
Club	Season	League			Cup		Europe		Other		Total	
Club	Season	Division	Apps	Goals	Apps	Goals	Apps	Goals	Apps	Goals	Apps	Goals
Flamurtari Vlorë	2007–08	Albanian Superliga	21	0	0	0	—		—		21	0
Flamurtari Vlorë	2008–09	Albanian Superliga	28	0	4	0	—		—		32	0
Flamurtari Vlorë	2009–10	Albanian Superliga	26	0	0	0	2 (Note: Appearance(s) in UEFA Europa League)	0	1 (Note: Appearance in Albanian Supercup)	0	29	0
Flamurtari Vlorë	2010–11	Albanian Superliga	21	1	0	0	—		—		21	1
Flamurtari Vlorë	2011–12	Albanian Superliga	8	0	2	0	4	0	—		14	0
Flamurtari Vlorë	Total		104	1	6	0	6	0	1	0	117	1
Apolonia Fier	2011–12	Albanian Superliga	9	0	0	0	—		1 (Note: Appearance in Albanian Superliga relegation play-off)	0	10	0
Kastrioti Krujë	2012–13	Albanian Superliga	19	1	4	0	—		—		23	1
Flamurtari Vlorë]	2013–14	Albanian Superliga	24	0	5	0	—		—		29	0
Adriatiku Mamurrasi	2014–15	Albanian First Division	3	0	1	0	—		—		4	0
Laçi	2014–15	Albanian Superliga	3	0	2	0	0	0	—		5	0
Teuta Durrës	2015–16	Albanian Superliga	30	0	4	0	—		—		34	0
Teuta Durrës	2016–17	Albanian Superliga	23	0	3	0	2	0	—		28	0
Teuta Durrës	2017–18	Albanian Superliga	17	1	6	0	—		—		23	1
Teuta Durrës	Total		70	1	13	0	2	0	—		85	1
Tirana	2018–19	Albanian Superliga	0	0	2	0	—		—		2	0
Bylis Ballsh	2018–19	Albanian First Division	0	0	0	0	—		—		0	0
Flamurtari Vlorë]	2019–20	Albanian Superliga	3	0	0	0	—		—		3	0
Career total			235	2	33	0	8	0	2	0	278	3

== Honours ==
Flamurtari Vlorë

- Albanian Cup: 2008–09, 2013–14

Laçi

- Albanian Cup: 2014–15
