= 2011 UEFA European Under-21 Championship qualification Group 10 =

Football tournament qualification stage

The teams competing in Group 10 of the 2011 UEFA European Under-21 Championships qualifying competition were Albania, Austria, Azerbaijan, Belarus and Scotland.

== Standings ==
Team	Pld	W	D	L	GF	GA	GD	Pts	(Scotland)	(Belarus)	(Austria)	(Albania)	(Azerbaijan)
Scotland	8	5	2	1	16	7	+9	17	—	1–0	3–1	5–2	2–2
Belarus	8	5	2	1	16	11	+5	17	1–1	—	2–1	4–2	1–0
Austria	8	4	2	2	17	11	+6	14	1–0	3–3	—	3–1	4–0
Albania	8	1	1	6	11	20	−9	4	0–1	1–2	2–2	—	1–0
Azerbaijan	8	1	1	6	8	19	−11	4	0–4	2–3	1–2	3–2	—

Qualification

- Scotland and Belarus secured a qualification to the UEFA Play-offs.
- Austria, Albania and Azerbaijan are eliminated.

== Matches ==
28 February 2009
15:00 CET

Albania	0–1	Scotland
	Report	Maguire 85' (pen.)

Stadioni Ruzhdi Bizhuta, Elbasan
Attendance: 2,010
Referee: Dumitru Aurelian Bogaciu (Romania)

1 April 2009
18:30 CET

Scotland	5–2	Albania
Goodwillie 36'; Maguire 51'; Shinnie 54'; Murphy 75'; McGinn 90+1'	Report	Hysa 73'; Vila 89'

Falkirk Stadium, Falkirk
Attendance: 3,080
Referee: Sandor Szabo (Hungary)

12 August 2009
16:00 CET

Belarus	2–1	Austria
Yurchenko 6'; Filipenko 61'	Report	Beichler 30'

City Stadium, Molodechno
Attendance: 4,150
Referee: Vlado Svilokos (Croatia)

5 September 2009
16:30 CET

Albania	1–0	Azerbaijan
Guliyev 63' (o.g.)	Report

Stadiumi Niko Dovana, Durrës
Attendance: 500
Referee: Stefano Podeschi (San Marino)
5 September 2009
18:00 CET

Austria	1–0	Scotland
Weimann 57'	Report

Bundesstadion Südstadt, Maria Enzersdorf
Attendance: 2,500
Referee: Tom Harald Hagen (Norway)

9 September 2009
19:00 CET

Austria	3–1	Albania
Nuhiu 3', 13'; Weimann 5'	Report	Roshi 41'

Franz Fürst, Wiener Neudorf
Attendance: 500
Referee: Artyom Kuchin (Kazakhstan)
9 September 2009
16:00 CET

Azerbaijan	2–3	Belarus
Abdullayev 23'; Narimanov 66'	Report	Sivakov 37'; Karpovich 43'; Rekish 55'

Tofik Bakhramov Stadium, Baku
Attendance: 3,000
Referee: Mario Vlk (Slovakia)

10 October 2009
16:00 CET

Azerbaijan	1–2	Austria
Soltanov 34'	Report	Margreitter 90' (pen.); Grünwald 90+3'

Tofik Bakhramov Stadium, Baku
Attendance: 300
Referee: Meir Levi (Israel)
10 October 2009
16:00 CET

Scotland	1–0	Belarus
Murphy 90+2'	Report

St Mirren Park, Paisley
Attendance: 4,011
Referee: Rusmir Mrković (Bosnia and Herzegovina)

14 October 2009
13:30 CET

Belarus	4–2	Albania
Nyakhaychyk 25'; Voronkov 38', 72'; Skavysh 41'	Report	Yanuzi 75'; Hysa 78'

City Stadium, Molodechno
Attendance: 2,525
Referee: Johannes Valgeirsson (Iceland)

13 November 2009
13:00 CET

Albania	2–2	Austria
Sykaj 20'; Roshi 50'	Report	Samina 52' (o.g.); Perstaller 79'

Stadiumi Niko Dovana, Durrës
Attendance: 350
Referee: Tomasz Mikulski (Poland)
14 November 2009
15:00 CET

Azerbaijan	0–4	Scotland
	Report	Murphy 26', 54'; Arfield 36'; Loy 83'

Tofik Bakhramov Stadium, Baku
Attendance: 300
Referee: Dragomir Stankovic (Serbia)

17 November 2009
14:00 CET

Albania	1–2	Belarus
Roshi 76'	Report	Skavysh 8', 38'

Stadiumi Niko Dovana, Durrës
Attendance: 1,000
Referee: Jérôme Laperriere (Switzerland)
18 November 2009
17:00 CET

Austria	4–0	Azerbaijan
Nuhiu 10', 19', 79'; Weimann 83'	Report

Franz Fürst, Wiener Neudorf
Attendance: 650
Referee: Aleksandr Gvardis (Russia)

2 March 2010
20:30 CET

Scotland	2–2	Azerbaijan
Maguire 32' (pen.); Griffiths 66'	Report	Hajiyev 13'; Abdullayev 65'

Falkirk Stadium, Falkirk
Attendance: 2,793
Referee: Ken Henry Johnsen (Norway)

11 August 2010
19:00 CET

Austria	3–3	Belarus
Nuhiu 29'; Arnautović 35'; Grünwald 44'	Report	Sivakov 31'; Rekish 75', 90'

Waldstadion, Pasching
Attendance: 3,600
Referee: Carlos Clos Gómez (Spain)

3 September 2010
17:00 CET

Belarus	1–1	Scotland
Nekhaychik 36'	Report	Maguire 64' (pen.)

City Stadium, Borisov
Attendance: 4,200
Referee: Antti Munukka (Finland)
4 September 2010
16:00 CET

Azerbaijan	3–2	Albania
Soltanov 17'; Seyidov 37'; Qurbanov 43'	Report	Cikalleshi 45'; Bala 87'

Tofik Bakhramov Stadium, Baku
Attendance: 300
Referee: Marios Panayi (Cyprus)

7 September 2010
17:00 CET

Belarus	1–0	Azerbaijan
Nekhaychik 76'	Report

City Stadium, Borisov
Attendance: 4,300
Referee: Stavros Tritsonis (Greece)
7 September 2010
17:00 CET

Scotland	2–1	Austria
Bannan 29'; Maguire 89'	Report	Arnautović 10'

Pittodrie Stadium, Aberdeen
Attendance: 2,064
Referee: Antony Gautier (France)

== Goalscorers ==
As of 4 September, there have been 64 goals scored over 18 games, for an average of 3.56 goals per game.

Goals	Player	Country
6	Atdhe Nuhiu	Austria
5	Chris Maguire	Scotland
4	Jamie Murphy	Scotland
3	Odise Roshi	Albania
3	Andreas Weimann	Austria
3	Dmitri Rekish	Belarus
3	Maksim Skavysh	Belarus
2	Vilfor Hysa	Albania
2	Alexander Grünwald	Austria
2	Araz Abdullayev	Azerbaijan
2	Bakhtiyar Soltanov	Azerbaijan
2	Pavel Nekhaychik	Belarus
2	Mikhail Sivakov	Belarus
2	Andrei Voronkov	Belarus

1 goal

Albania
- Bekim Bala
- Sokol Cikalleshi
- Arsen Sykaj
- Emiljano Vila
- Ahmed Yanuzi

Austria
- Marko Arnautović
- Daniel Beichler
- Georg Margreitter
- Julius Perstaller

Azerbaijan
- Ruslan Qurbanov
- Nizami Hajiyev
- Tural Narimanov
- Mirhüseyn Seyidov

Belarus
- Egor Filipenko
- Igor Karpovich
- Vladimir Yurchenko

Scotland
- Scott Arfield
- David Goodwillie
- Leigh Griffiths
- Rory Loy
- Stephen McGinn
- Andrew Shinnie

Own Goals

- (Azerbaijan) Eshgin Guliyev (for Albania)
- (Albania) Klodian Samina (for Austria)
