= Renato Malota =

Albanian footballer (born 1989)

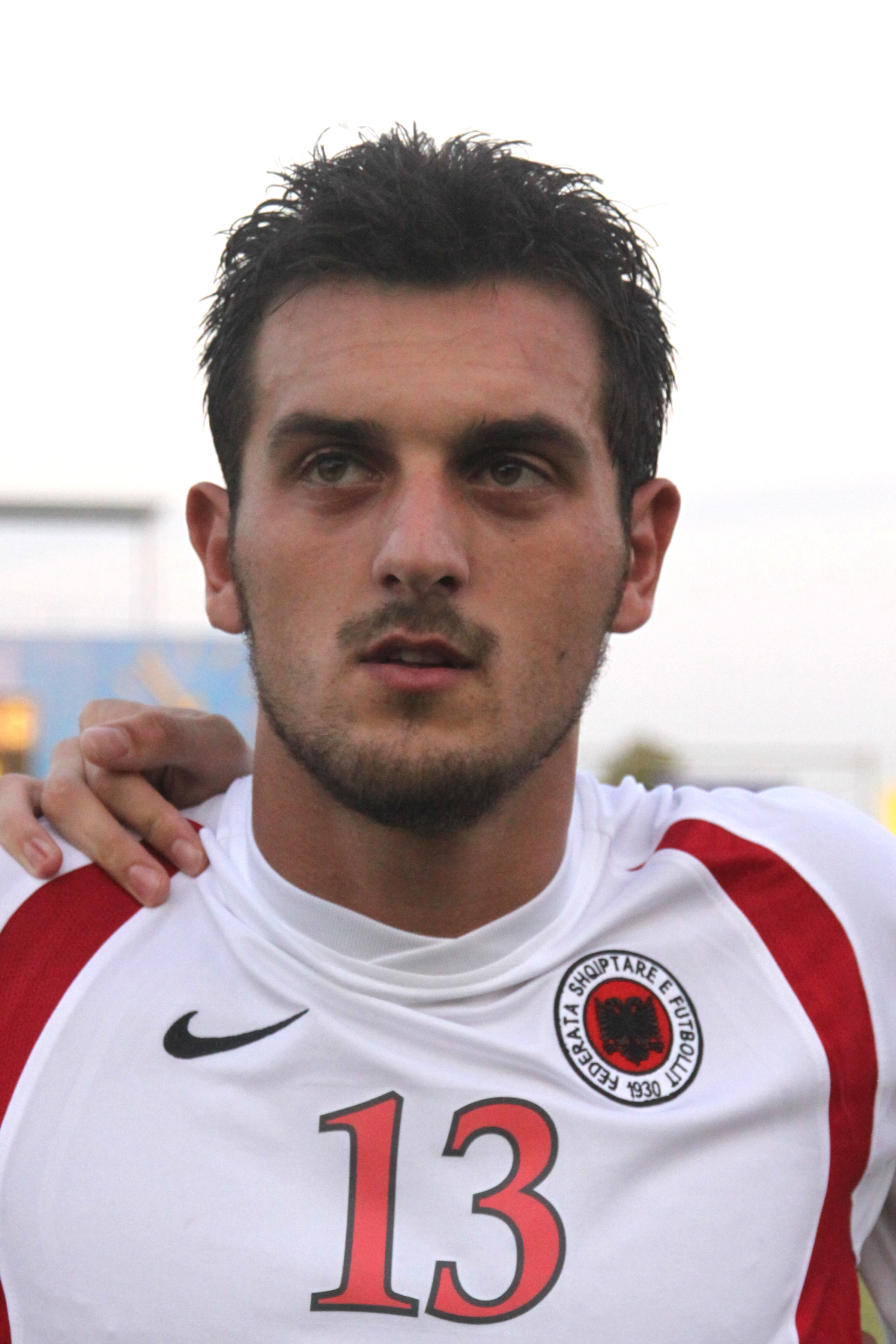
- Malota with Albania U21 in 2009

Personal information
- Date of birth: 24 June 1989 (age 37)
- Place of birth: Lezhë, Albania
- Height: 1.91 m (6 ft 3 in)
- Position: Centre-back

Youth career
- 2002–2007: Besëlidhja

Senior career*
Years	Team	Apps	(Gls)
2007–2008	Besëlidhja	5	(0)
2008–2009	Partizani Tirana	22	(1)
2009–2012	Dinamo Tirana	50	(4)
2012–2016	Kukësi	115	(4)
2016–2017	Partizani Tirana	35	(1)
2018–2020	Vllaznia	60	(5)
2020–2022	Laçi	47	(2)
2022–2025	Egnatia	83	(3)

International career^{‡}
2007	Albania U18	1	(0)
2007–2008	Albania U19	7	(0)
2009	Albania U20	2	(0)
2008–2009	Albania U21	7	(0)
- * Club domestic league appearances and goals as of 22 October 2025 ‡ National team caps and goals as of 22 October 2025

Renato Malota (born 24 June 1989) is an Albanian former professional footballer who played as a centre-back.

== Club career ==
=== Kukësi ===
On 9 August 2012, Malota completed a transfer at newly promoted Kukësi in club's first ever top flight season. He was handed squad number 24, and played as starter in club's first ever Albanian Superliga match versus Luftëtari Gjirokastër which ended in a goalless draw. Malota made his first cup appearance on 24 October in the first leg of second round against Tirana to help Kukësi achieve a historic 4–0 win at home versus capital club. Malota's first score-sheet contributions came later on 10 February of the following year by netting the second of the 1–3 at Luftëtari Gjirokastër in the matchday 14. His second of the season came later on 7 April in form of an opener in an eventual 1–1 draw at Teuta Durrës. Malota concluded his first season at Kukësi by making 30 appearances, including 23 in league as Kukësi finished runner-up in championship to Skënderbeu Korçë and was eliminated in the semi-final of Albanian Cup by Laçi.

In the summer of 2013, Malota played an important role in Kukësi's squad that reached the play-off round of UEFA Europa League. He played in all 8 matches and scored one goal. He appeared as substitute in both matches of first qualifying round against Flora as Kukësi progressed though away goal rule. Malota then played as starter in the next two-legged tie against Sarajevo, as Kukësi won 3–2 on aggregate to advance to the third qualifying round. He scored his first European goal on 1 August 2013 in the first leg of third qualifying round versus Metalurh Donetsk to lead Kukësi into a 2–0 home win. Kukësi then become the first Albanian club to reach play-off of an UEFA club competition after losing 1–0 in the second leg. At play-off round, Malota couldn't avoid the elimination at the hands of Trabzonspor as Süper Lig club reached group stage by winning 5–1 on aggregate.

=== Return to Partizani Tirana ===
On 8 August 2016, Malota completed a move to Partizani Tirana for an undisclosed fee, returning at Red Bulls for the first time after seven years. He was presented on the same day, where he penned a two-year contract, stating: "This is the right year to win the title", while refused to show the reasons why he left Kukësi where he was the captain. He had to wait until matchday 8 to made his debut as he entered as a second-half substitute in Partizani's 0–1 defeat of Korabi Peshkopi at Selman Stërmasi Stadium. In the beginning of 2017, Malota finally won his place at the starting lineup, making four full-90 minutes appearances in February. He scored his first goal of the season on 20 February in the Capital derby against Tirana, heading home a Lorenc Trashi cross in an eventual 2–1 win at Selman Stërmasi Stadium.

Malota left the club in the first days of January 2018 after being excluded from winter training camp in Antalya. He finished his second stint at capital club by playing 35 appearances in all competitions.

=== Vllaznia Shkodër ===
On 10 January 2017, Vllaznia Shkodër completed the signing of Malota on a free transfer. The player penned a contract running until the end of the season with an option to renew for another season.

== International career ==
=== Youth ===
Malota has represented Albania in under-19, -20 and -21 levels, but is yet to make his senior debut.

Under-20

In June 2009, Malota was called up by manager of under-20 side Artan Bushati to be part of the team at 2009 Mediterranean Games. He captained his side in both matches of Group D; the first, a 1–2 loss to Tunisia, and the second, a 0–3 loss to Spain which brought the elimination from the tournament.

Under-21

Malota become part of under-21 squad for the remaining three matches of Group 1 qualifying campaign. He played his first match on 20 August 2008 as Albania drew 1–1 against Greece at Ruzhdi Bizhuta Stadium. Malota also played in the final two matches, receiving two yellow cards as Albania lost 0–4 to Croatia and drew 0–0 against Azerbaijan. Albania finished Group 1 in 4th place with 12 points.

Malota continued to be part of under-21 squad for the next European qualifying campaign where Albania was placed in Group 10. He started in the team's opening match on 28 March 2009, a late loss home to Scotland. He appeared in the next three matches as Albania finished 5th in their group, leaving behind only Azerbaijan. Malota concluded his under-21 career by playing 7 matches and scoring no goals.

== Career statistics ==
As of 17 December 2017

Club	Season	League			Cup		Europe		Total	
Club	Season	Division	Apps	Goals	Apps	Goals	Apps	Goals	Apps	Goals
Besëlidhja Lezhë	2007–08	Albanian Superliga	5	0	0	0	—		5	0
Partizani Tirana	2008–09	Albanian Superliga	22	1	6	0	—		28	1
Dinamo Tirana	2009–10	Albanian Superliga	19	2	5	0	—		24	2
Dinamo Tirana	2010–11	Albanian Superliga	13	0	5	0	1 (Note: All appearance(s) in UEFA Champions League)	0	19	0
Dinamo Tirana	2011–12	Albanian Superliga	18	2	1	0	—		19	2
Dinamo Tirana	Total		50	4	11	0	1	0	62	4
Kukësi	2012–13	Albanian Superliga	23	2	7	0	—		30	2
Kukësi	2013–14	Albanian Superliga	29	0	8	0	8 (Note: All appearance(s) in UEFA Europa League)	1	45	1
Kukësi	2014–15	Albanian Superliga	34	1	5	0	0	0	39	0
Kukësi	2015–16	Albanian Superliga	29	1	7	2	6	0	42	3
Kukësi	2016–17	Albanian Superliga	0	0	1	0	4	0	4	0
Kukësi	Total		115	4	27	2	18	1	215	1
Partizani Tirana	2016–17	Albanian Superliga	20	1	1	0	—		21	1
Partizani Tirana	2017–18	Albanian Superliga	11	0	3	1	0	0	14	1
Partizani Tirana	Total		31	1	4	1	0	0	35	2
Vllaznia Shkodër	2017–18	Albanian Superliga	0	0	0	0	—		0	0
Career total			221	10	48	3	19	1	288	14

== Honours ==
Dinamo Tirana

- Albanian Superliga: 2009–10

Kukësi

- Albanian Cup: 2015–16

Egnatia

- Kategoria Superiore:2023–24, 2024–25
- Albanian Cup: 2023–24, Runner-up:2024–25
- Albanian Supercup: Runner-up:2023, 2024

Sporting positions
Preceded by	Albania U20 captain 2009	Succeeded by Aldo Teqja
