= Sokol Cikalleshi =

Albanian footballer (born 1990)

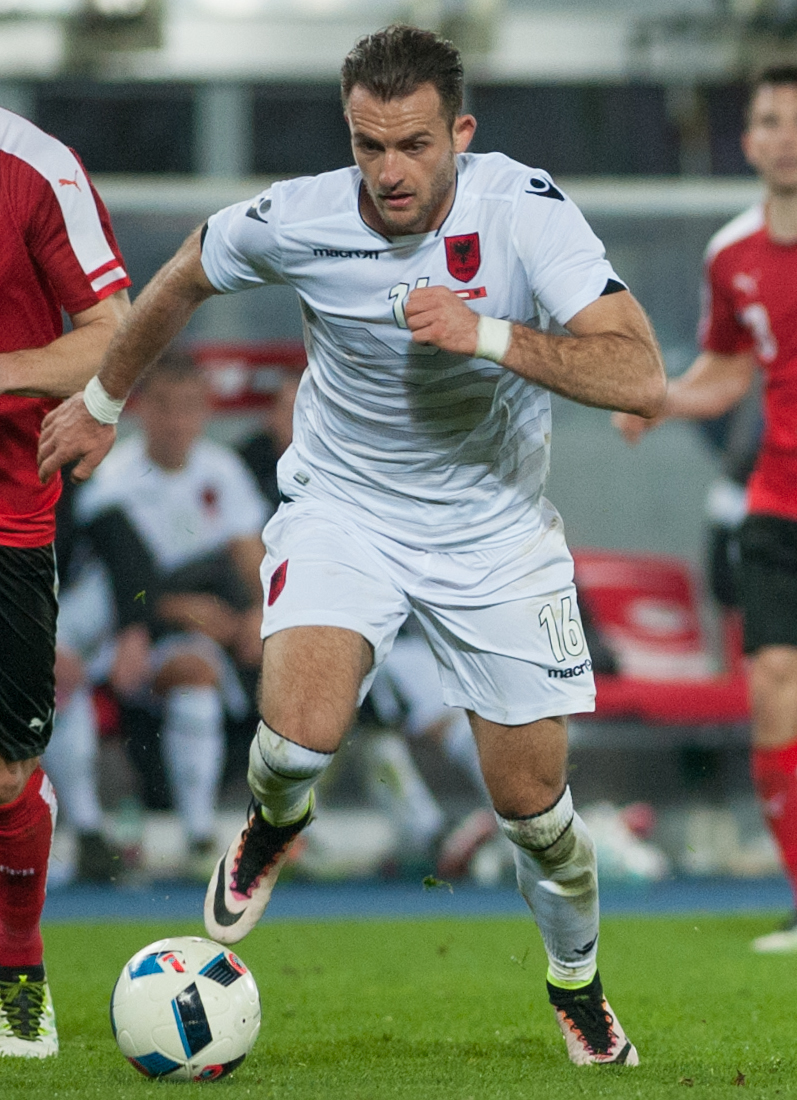
- Cikalleshi with Albania in 2016

Personal information
- Date of birth: 27 July 1990 (age 36)
- Place of birth: Kavajë, PSR Albania
- Height: 1.87 m (6 ft 2 in)
- Position: Forward

Youth career
- 2002–2008: Besa

Senior career*
Years	Team	Apps	(Gls)
2007–2013	Besa	57	(11)
2011	→ Skënderbeu (loan)	4	(0)
2012	→ Tirana (loan)	13	(2)
2012	→ Incheon United (loan)	6	(0)
2013–2014	Kukësi	30	(17)
2014–2015	Split	32	(10)
2015–2017	İstanbul Başakşehir	31	(6)
2017	→ Akhisar Belediyespor (loan)	14	(7)
2017–2019	Osmanlıspor	26	(6)
2018–2019	→ Göztepe (loan)	7	(0)
2019–2020	Akhisar Belediyespor	39	(8)
2020–2024	Konyaspor	105	(30)
2022–2023	→ Al-Khaleej (loan)	29	(10)
2024–2025	Tractor	6	(0)
2025	Adanaspor	14	(3)

International career
2008	Albania U19	2	(0)
2009	Albania U20	2	(0)
2009–2011	Albania U21	3	(1)
2010–2024	Albania	61	(13)
- * Club domestic league appearances and goals as of 15 June 2025

Sokol Cikalleshi (Albanian pronunciation: ['sɔkɔl 'tsikaɫɛʃi]; born 27 July 1990) is an Albanian professional footballer who plays as a forward and is currently a free agent, having most recently played for Adanaspor.

He made his professional debut in 2007 as a 17-year-old with his hometown club Besa, and would then go on loan to Skënderbeu, Tirana and South Korean side Incheon United between 2011 and 2012. He joined Kukësi in 2013 and scored 22 goals in all competitions during the 2013–14 campaign, where he gained the attention of the Albania national team setup as well as Croatian side RNK Split who signed the player in 2014 for a reported fee of €100,000. He was the club's top goalscorer during the 2014–15 campaign, netting 13 times in all competitions before joining Turkish club İstanbul Başakşehir for a €1.8 million fee in 2015.

An Albanian international, Cikalleshi with 12 goals scored, is his country's joint active player top goalscorer along Armando Sadiku and 4th in the overall ranking. At youth level, he represented Albania under-21 with whom he made 4 appearances and scored 1 goal. He was first called up to the Albania national team by Gianni De Biasi and he made his debut on 31 May 2014 against Romania and he has been a regular member of the national side, earning over 50 caps and was also part of UEFA Euro 2016 squad.

== Club career ==
=== Besa ===
Cikalleshi joined his hometown club Besa in 2002 as a 12-year-old and he progressed through the youth ranks at the club, until he made his professional debut at the age of 17 on the final day of the 2007–08 Kategoria Superiore against local rivals Teuta, a match in which he came on as a half time substitute in a 5–3 win. In the following season he was an important member of the club's under-19s, as he captained the side to the national championship title in a season where he also made 10 league appearances for the senior side, including 2 starts. Under Shpëtim Duro, Cikalleshi became a regular first team member during the 2009–10 campaign, where he was part of strike force that included Daniel Xhafaj and Vioresin Sinani, who are two of the most prolific strikers in Albanian football history.

He made 27 league appearances and scored twice, with his first professional goal coming against Shkumbini on 29 August 2011 in the Kategoria Superiore, and he also went on to score against Vllaznia later in the season. The 2009–10 campaign proved to be one of the club's most successful ever season, as they finished runners-up in the Kategoria Superiore behind Dinamo Tirana and won the Albanian Cup for only the second time in history. Cikalleshi played a significant role in the club's cup winning run, as he made 8 appearances and scored twice, including the winning goal in the semi-final against Shkumbini. that sent Besa to the final, which was won against Vllaznia.

==== Loan to Skënderbeu ====
He agreed to join Skënderbeu on a 6-month loan deal ahead of the opening of the January 1transfer window, and travelled with the rest of the squad to Antalya, Turkey for their mid season training camp.

==== Loan to Tirana ====
Cikalleshi joined Tirana on loan until the end of the 2011–12 season on 27 January 2012 following a successful trial at the club, claiming it to be the "chance of a lifetime" to have the chance to play for the club. He made his debut for the club in the Albanian Cup against Bylis on 29 January, where he came on as a substitute in the 63rd minute for Klodian Duro in the goalless draw.

==== Loan to Incheon United ====
In July 2012, Cikalleshi joined South Korean K-League club Incheon United FC on a 6-month loan deal. During his time at Blue-Blacks, Cikalleshi made six appearances, only two of them as a starter, collecting 193 minutes in the process.

=== Kukësi ===
In August 2013, Cikalleshi joined FK Kukësi club on a one-year contract. He made his debut with the club on 4 September 2013 during the 1–0 shock lose against the newcomers of Lushnja. He opened his scoring account eight weeks later where he scored during the 2–1 away lose against Flamurtari, which was followed by another goal in the next week at Laçi, where Kukësi won in the very last seconds thanks to a penalty. On 6 November 2013, in the returning leg of the first round of 2013–14 Albanian Cup, Cikalleshi scored in a 5–0 thrashing of Naftëtari, helping Kukësi to advance in the next round with the aggregate 6–0. He scored for the fourth consecutive match, this time against his former side KF Tirana helping Kukësi to prevail 2–1 at Zeqir Ymeri Stadium; he was later selected "Man of the Match".

=== RNK Split ===
Following FK Kukësi's elimination in the Europa League, on 16 July 2014 Cikalleshi signed for Croatian side RNK Split on a three-year contract for a fee of €100,000. He was presented on the same day where he choose the squad number 99. However, Kukësi claimed that they would not give Cikalleshi permission to play, as his documents were still at the club. The club also added that the player has still a year remaining in his contract, and that they would send the case to FIFA and UEFA.

On 19 August he scored his first goal with RNK Split in a match against NK Hrvace, valid for the 2014–15 Croatian Football Cup.

=== İstanbul Başakşehir ===
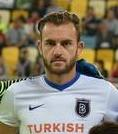
Cikalleshi with İstanbul Başakşehir in 2016

On 6 June 2015, RNK Split accepted the €1.8 million bid of Turkish side İstanbul Başakşehir to transfer Cikalleshi to the Süper Lig club. Ten days later Cikalleshi was presented to the club where he signed a 4-years contract.

==== Loan at Akhisar Belediyespor ====
In January 2017 Cikalleshi was loaned to fellow Süper Lig side Akhisar Belediyespor until the end of the season. He made his debut few days later against Gümüşhanespor valid for the Turkish Cup playing as a starter in a 3–1 win with Akhisar Belediyespor progressing through the quarter-finals. He scored his first goal on 13 March 2017 against Trabzonspor in the 11th minute for the opening goal of the match which eventually finished in the 1–3 loss as opponent overturned in the second-half. On 1 April 2017 Cikalleshi scored 1 goal against his owning team İstanbul Başakşehir in the 90'+4-minute to give his side the 2–1 victory. On 23 April 2017 Cikalleshi scored 1 goal and provided 1 assist against Bursaspor in a 5–1 victory. In the next game week Cikalleshi gave 2 assist for all team's goals scored against Kasımpaşa in a 2–0 victory, which made Akhisar Belediyespor to secure standing in the Süper Lig for next season. On 8 May 2017 Cikalleshi scored two fast goals between 3 minutes and made also a shoot which caused an own goal by a Gaziantepspor defender. Akhisar Belediyespor took a glorious 6–0 victory. Cikalleshi scored his 6th goal on 22 May 2017 against Alanyaspor in a 3–0 victory.

==== Return ====
Cikalleshi was included in the squad list to participate in the 2017–18 UEFA Champions League Third qualifying round.

=== Osmanlıspor ===
On 28 August 2017 Cikalleshi signed for fellow Süper Lig side Osmanlıspor a 3-years contract, transferring from İstanbul Başakşehir for a fee of €2 million and will earn €2.5 million per season. He made his debut in the 4th game week against Göztepe on 10 September 2017 coming on as a substitute at half-time in a 0–2 loss. Cikalleshi started the 2018 in a phenomenal way as he was given a starting place in the 2017–18 Turkish Cup round of 16 second Leg match against Beşiktaş in which he managed to score twice respectively in the 86th minute to balance the score only 3 minutes after disadvantage and in the 88th minute to give his side the 2–1 victory; however his goals weren't enough Beşiktaş advanced further after winning the first leg 4–1.

=== Akhisar Belediyespor ===
On 16 January 2019, Cikalleshi made a surprise return to Turkish top flight by signing with Akhisar Belediyespor, whom he had a successful, albeit short spell in 2016–17 season. He signed a contract until June 2022 and was given squad number 37. In his first game two days later, Cikalleshi played in the second half and scored his team's lone goal in a 1–3 home defeat to Beşiktaş.

=== Konyaspor ===
On 11 September 2020, Cikalleshi was signed by Konyaspor on a two-year contract for an undisclosed fee. He made his competitive debut eight days later in a goalless draw against Gençlerbirliği, and scored his first goal later on 16 January 2021 in a 3–2 home win over Göztepe. On 3 February 2022, Cikalleshi extended his contract with the club for two more years. On 24 August 2022, Cikalleshi joined Saudi Arabian club Al-Khaleej on loan from Konyaspor. He scored 10 goals in 29 league appearances as his side narrowly avoided relegation. In July 2023, Cikalleshi returned to his parent club ahead of the 2023–24 season. He had a strong start to the season, scoring for the first time in the opening two rounds, respectively against İstanbulspor and Antalyaspor.

== International career ==
=== Youth ===
Cikalleshi has been a former Albania youth international, representing under-19, -20 and -21 levels.

He was part of Albania under-19 squad in the qualifiers of 2009 UEFA European Under-19 Championship. His first appearance with under-19 squad occurred on 10 October 2008 in the matchday 2 of Group 5 against Serbia which finished in a 5–0 away loss. He went on to make another appearance as Albania finished Group 9 in the last position.

In June 2009, Cikalleshi was called up by manager of Albania under-20 side Artan Bushati to be part of the team at 2009 Mediterranean Games. He played as a starter in both matches of Group D; in the first, a 1–2 loss to Tunisia, he played for 70 minutes and in the second he played the full match in a 0–3 loss to Spain which brought the elimination from the tournament.

Cikalleshi then was part of under-21 squad for the qualifiers of 2011 UEFA European Under-21 Championship where Albania was placed in Group 10. Cikalleshi made his competitive debut on 13 November 2009 in the matchday 6 against Austria, entering in the last moments as Albania drew 2–2. Later on 4 September 2010, with Albania already eliminated, Cikalleshi played his first match as starter in the final matchday against Azerbaijan, scoring a goal by unable to avoid the 3–2 away loss. Albania finished Group 10 in the 4th position with only 4 points from 8 matches.

=== Senior ===
After his good performances with Kukësi in the 2013–14 season, Cikalleshi received his first call up at the Albania senior squad by coach Gianni De Biasi for friendlies against Romania in May and Hungary & San Marino in June 2014. He made his international debut on 31 May in the 1–0 away loss to Romania, playing in the first half before leaving for Shkëlzen Gashi.

On 16 November 2015, Cikalleshi came off the bench to score his first international goal for Albania in the 94th minute to give Albania the 2–2 draw in a friendly home against Georgia, in the last international match at Qemal Stafa Stadium.

Cikalleshi lost his place in the starting lineup from the beginning of 2016 due to good running form of fellow striker Armando Sadiku. He was however, named in Albania's preliminary 27-man squad for UEFA Euro 2016, and in Albania's final 23-man UEFA Euro 2016 squad on 31 May. Cikalleshi made his first appearance against Switzerland in the opening match, entering in the last 15 minutes as Albania suffered a 1–0 loss. Those were the only minutes that his played during the campaign as he was an unused substitute in the next matches against France and Romania. Albania finished the group in the third position with three points and with a goal difference –2, and was ranked last in the third-placed teams, which eventually eliminated them.

Cikalleshi was barely used in Albania's 2018 FIFA World Cup qualifying campaign. He made only 3 appearances, only one as starter, collecting 132 minutes without scoring. In September 2017, he was called-up and later omitted by manager Christian Panucci for the matches against Liechtenstein and Macedonia as he asked permission to conclude his transfer at Osmanlıspor.

Cikalleshi was Albania's main striker in their historic UEFA Euro 2024 qualifying campaign, during which they won Group E with 15 points. He scored once during the campaign, a penalty in a 1–1 draw away against Moldova. In May 2024, he was omitted by manager Sylvinho in Albania's preliminary list for the final tournament, a decision which created controversy within Albanian media. He announced his retirement one day after the list was made public.

== Style of play ==
Cikalleshi is a versatile attacking player who is known for his goalscoring ability. Cikalleshi is also skilled in the air and considered an aerial threat.

== Personal life ==
Following Albania's historic participation at UEFA Euro 2016, Cikalleshi was among the members of the national team who were issued diplomatic passports by the Albanian government in recognition of their achievement.

On 12 October 2017, Cikalleshi become a father for the first time when his wife gave birth to the couple's first daughter, named Rajna.

== Career statistics ==
=== Club ===
As of 31 January 2024

Appearances and goals by club, season and competition
Club	Season	League			Cup		Europe (Note: Including continental competitions, such as UEFA Champions League and UEFA Europa League)		Other (Note: Including other competitions, such as Albanian Supercup)		Total	
Club	Season	Division	Apps	Goals	Apps	Goals	Apps	Goals	Apps	Goals	Apps	Goals
Besa	2007–08	Kategoria Superiore	1	0	—		—		—		1	0
Besa	2008–09	Kategoria Superiore	10	0	—		—		—		10	0
Besa	2009–10	Kategoria Superiore	27	2	6	2	—		—		33	4
Besa	2010–11	Kategoria Superiore	15	6	1	1	1 (Note: Appearance(s) in UEFA Europa League)	0	1 (Note: Including one appearance in Albanian Supercup)	0	19	7
Besa	2012–13	Kategoria Superiore	4	3	—		—		—		4	3
Besa	Total		57	11	7	3	2	0	1	0	67	14
Skënderbeu (loan)	2010–11	Kategoria Superiore	4	0	1	0	—		—		5	0
Tirana (loan)	2011–12	Kategoria Superiore	13	2	9	3	—		—		22	5
Incheon United (loan)	2012	K-League	6	0	—		—		—		6	0
Kukësi	2013–14	Kategoria Superiore	30	17	9	5	2	0	—		41	22
Kukësi	2014–15	Kategoria Superiore	—		—		2	0	—		2	0
Kukësi	Total		30	17	9	5	4	0	—		43	22
RNK Split	2014–15	Prva Liga	32	10	7	3	—		—		39	13
İstanbul Başakşehir	2015–16	Süper Lig	27	6	8	7	2	0	—		37	13
İstanbul Başakşehir	2016–17	Süper Lig	2	0	6	3	3	0	—		11	3
İstanbul Başakşehir	2017–18	Süper Lig	2	0	—		0 (Note: Appearance(s) in UEFA Champions League)	0	—		2	0
İstanbul Başakşehir	Total		31	6	14	10	5	0	—		50	16
Akhisar Belediyespor (loan)	2016–17	Süper Lig	14	7	2	0	—		—		16	7
Osmanlıspor	2017–18	Süper Lig	25	6	4	2	—		—		29	8
Osmanlıspor	2018–19	TFF First League	1	0	0	0	—		—		1	0
Osmanlıspor	Total		26	6	4	2	—		—		30	8
Göztepe (loan)	2018–19	Süper Lig	7	0	3	2	—		—		10	2
Akhisar Belediyespor	2018–19	Süper Lig	13	0	5	3	—		—		18	3
Akhisar Belediyespor	2019–20	TFF First League	26	8	—		—		—		26	8
Akhisar Belediyespor	Total		39	8	5	3	—		—		44	11
Konyaspor	2020–21	Süper Lig	35	8	2	0	—		—		37	8
Konyaspor	2021–22	Süper Lig	34	10	0	0	—		—		34	10
Konyaspor	2022–23	Süper Lig	2	0	0	0	3	0	—		5	0
Konyaspor	2023–24	Süper Lig	19	8	1	0	—		—		20	8
Konyaspor	Total		90	26	3	0	3	0	—		96	26
Al-Khaleej (loan)	2022–23	Saudi Pro League	29	10	1	1	—		—		30	11
Career total			378	103	65	32	13	0	1	0	457	135

=== International ===
Appearances and goals by national team and year
National team	Year	Apps	Goals
Albania	2010	1	0
Albania	2011	0	0
Albania	2012	0	0
Albania	2013	0	0
Albania	2014	7	0
Albania	2015	8	1
Albania	2016	7	1
Albania	2017	4	0
Albania	2018	2	0
Albania	2019	6	4
Albania	2020	3	4
Albania	2021	8	2
Albania	2022	6	0
Albania	2023	7	1
Albania	2024	2	0
Total		61	13

Scores and results list Albania's goal tally first, score column indicates score after each Cikalleshi goal.

List of international goals scored by Sokol Cikalleshi
No.	Date	Venue	Cap	Opponent	Score	Result	Competition
1	16 November 2015	Qemal Stafa Stadium, Tirana, Albania	15	Georgia	2–2	2–2	Friendly
2	29 March 2016	Stade Josy Barthel, Route d'Arlon, Luxembourg	17	Luxembourg	2–0	2–0	Friendly
3	11 June 2019	Elbasan Arena, Elbasan, Albania	30	Moldova	1–0	2–0	UEFA Euro 2020 qualification
4	7 September 2019	Stade de France, Saint-Denis, France	31	France	1–4	1–4	UEFA Euro 2020 qualification
5	10 September 2019	Elbasan Arena, Elbasan, Albania	32	Iceland	4–2	4–2	UEFA Euro 2020 qualification
6	14 October 2019	Zimbru Stadium, Chișinău, Moldova	34	Moldova	1–0	4–0	UEFA Euro 2020 qualification
7	4 September 2020	Dinamo Stadium, Minsk, Belarus	35	Belarus	1–0	2–0	2020–21 UEFA Nations League C
8	15 November 2020	Arena Kombëtare, Tirana, Albania	36	Kazakhstan	1–0	3–1	2020–21 UEFA Nations League C
9	18 November 2020	Arena Kombëtare, Tirana, Albania	37	Belarus	1–0	3–2	2020–21 UEFA Nations League C
10	18 November 2020	Arena Kombëtare, Tirana, Albania	37	Belarus	2–0	3–2	2020–21 UEFA Nations League C
11	8 June 2021	Stadion Letná, Prague, Czech Republic	42	Czech Republic	1–1	1–3	Friendly
12	2 September 2021	Stadion Narodowy, Warsaw, Poland	43	Poland	1–1	1–4	2022 FIFA World Cup qualification
13	17 November 2023	Zimbru Stadium, Chișinău, Moldova	58	Moldova	1–0	1–1	UEFA Euro 2024 qualifying

== Honours ==
Besa

- Albanian Cup: 2009–10
- Albanian Supercup: 2010

Skënderbeu

- Kategoria Superiore: 2010–11

Individual

- Turkish Cup top scorer: 2015–16, 2018-19
- Albanian Superliga Player of the Month: March 2014
- UEFA Nations League C top scorer: 2020–21
