= Xhelilaj =

Xhelilaj is an Albanian surname. Notable people with the surname include:

- Klodian Xhelilaj (born 1988), Albanian football goalkeeper
- Nik Xhelilaj (born 1983), Albanian actor
