= Ergi Goga =

Albanian footballer

Personal information
- Date of birth: 25 October 2002 (age 24)
- Place of birth: Tirana, Albania
- Position: Left-back

Team information
- Current team: Erzeni
- Number: 25

Youth career
- 2014–2015: Tekstil
- 2015–2016: Kombinati Futboll
- 2016–2018: Laçi
- 2018–2021: Akademia e Futbollit

Senior career*
| Years | Team | Apps | (Gls) |
| 2021– | Erzeni | 12 | (0) |

International career
| 2021–2022 | Albania U20 | 3 | (0) |
| 2022 | Albania U21 | 1 | (0) |
- * Club domestic league appearances and goals

Ergi Goga (born 25 October 2002) is an Albanian professional footballer who currently play as a left-back for Kategoria e Parë club Erzeni.
