= Omar Musaj =

Albanian footballer (born 2002)

Personal information
- Date of birth: 15 April 2002 (age 24)
- Place of birth: Tirana, Albania
- Position: Left-back

Team information
- Current team: Kastrioti
- Number: 22

Youth career
- 2011–2020: Tirana

Senior career*
Years	Team	Apps	(Gls)
2020–2023	Tirana	4	(0)
2021–2022	→ Erzeni (loan)	16	(0)
2022–2023	→ Turbina Cerrik (loan)	19	(0)
2023–	Kastrioti	30	(2)

International career
2019	Albania U18	4	(0)
2020	Albania U19	1	(0)
2021	Albania U20	2	(0)
- * Club domestic league appearances and goals as of 8 May 2024

Omar Musaj (born 15 April 2002) is an Albanian professional footballer who plays as a left-back for Kastrioti.

== Career ==
A youth academy graduate of Tirana, Musaj made his professional debut on 4 November 2020 in a 2–0 league win against Kukësi.

Musaj is a former Albania youth international.

== Career statistics ==
=== Club ===
As of 23 December 2020

Club	Season	League			Cup		Other		Total	
Club	Season	Division	Apps	Goals	Apps	Goals	Apps	Goals	Apps	Goals
Tirana	2020–21	Kategoria Superiore	3	0	1	0	0	0	4	0
Career total			3	0	1	0	0	0	4	0
