= Aldo Teqja =

Albanian footballer

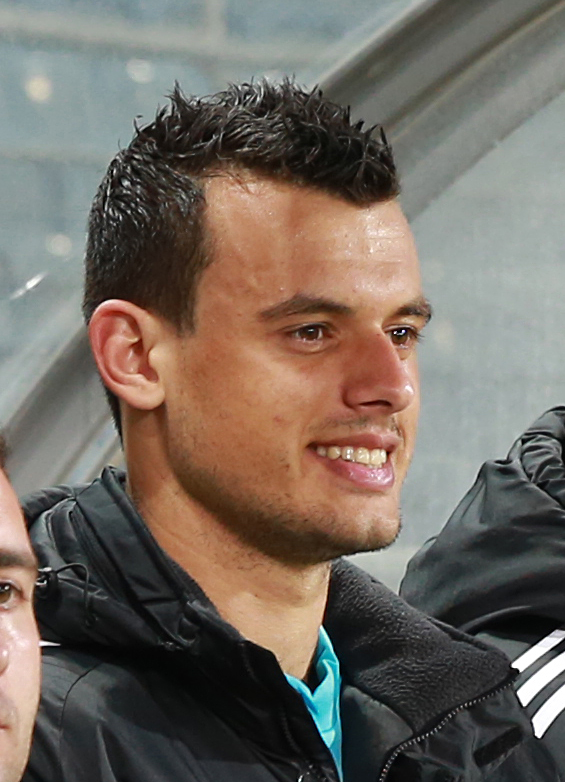
- Aldo Teqja with Anorthosis Famagusta in 2013.

Personal information
- Date of birth: 4 May 1995 (age 31)
- Place of birth: Tirana, Albania
- Height: 1.96 m (6 ft 5 in)
- Position: Goalkeeper

Team information
- Current team: Dinamo City
- Number: 12

Youth career
- 2009–2010: Dinamo Tirana
- 2011–2014: Anorthosis Famagusta

Senior career*
Years	Team	Apps	(Gls)
2013–2016	Anorthosis	3	(0)
2014–2015	→ Elpida Xylofagou (loan)	22	(0)
2016–2019	Skënderbeu	34	(0)
2019–2023	Partizani	20	(0)
2022–2023	→ Bylis Ballsh (loan)	34	(0)
2023–2024	Flamurtari	29	(0)
2024–	Dinamo City	58	(0)

International career
2009	Albania U15	2	(0)
2010–2012	Albania U17	9	(0)
2012	Albania U20	5	(0)
2013–2016	Albania U21	5	(0)
- * Club domestic league appearances and goals as of 25 June 2026

Aldo Teqja (born 4 May 1995) is an Albanian professional footballer who plays as a goalkeeper for Albanian club Dinamo City.

== Club career ==
=== Anorthosis Famagusta ===
Teqja joined Cypriot club Anorthosis Famagusta in January 2011 from Dinamo Tirana for a reported fee of €60,000 as the side's first winter signing. He initially joined the youth team at the club before being promoted to the first team ahead to the 2013–14 season, where he acted as an understudy for Mathieu Valverde and Mario Vega. He made his professional debut on 3 May 2014 in a home tie against Omonia Nicosia which ended in a 2–1 defeat. Until the end of the season 2013-14 Teqja counted 3 appearances with Anorthosis Famagusta with one match without conceded a goal. In the penultimate game of the season he conceded 8 goals against APOEL FC as he finished the season with 3 league appearances.

==== Loaned to Elpida Xylofagou ====
On 22 August 2014 he was loaned out to Elpida Xylofagou in order to gain more first team experience, especially following the arrival of Thomas Kaminski from Anderlecht at Anorthosis Famagusta.

=== Albania ===
After more than 5 years spent in Cyprus, Teqja was returned in Albania singing for Albanian Superliga side FK Kukësi managed by Klodian Duro on 18 June 2016.

On 4 July 2019 FK Partizani Tirana confirmed, that Teqja had joined the club on a one-year deal.

== International career ==
=== Albania U15 ===
Teqja received his first international level call-up at age of 14 by coach Sulejman Demollari of the Albania national under-15 football team, which were just founded in 2009 for participating in the 2010 Summer Youth Olympics (Football). He made his under-15 debut on 17 October by featuring full-90 minutes in the semi-final qualification round match against Liechtenstein which ended in a 2–0 win. Then the team advanced to the final where they faced Montenegro two days later, losing 1–2 as Teqja played another full-90 minute match, missing their participation in the 2010 Summer Youth Olympics finals.

=== Albania U17 ===
Aldo Teqja has played 3 matches on the European Under-17 Championship in 2011. He has also played in the same competition in 2012. In 2012 he and his team also played on the EURO U-17 Elite round where he played 3 matches.

=== Albania U19 ===
Teqja was called up to the Albania national under-19 football team to participate in the 2013 UEFA European Under-19 Championship qualification, coached by Foto Strakosha. Teqja didn't manage to play any minutes in the Group 7 matches as coach Foto Strakosha played with Thomas Strakosha as an undisputed starter.

=== Albania U20 ===
Teqja was called up at Albania national under-20 football team by coach Skënder Gega to participate in the 2013 Mediterranean Games football tournament which began on 19 June 2013 in Mersin, Turkey. Teqja played in all 5 Albania U20s matches in which 4 of them were full 90-minutes, 1 as starter until second-half where he was substituted off for Marsel Çaka. Albania U20 was ranked in the last place out of 8 teams.

== Career statistics ==
=== Club ===
As of 13 December 2017

Club statistics
Club	Season	League			Cup		Europe (Note: Including continental competitions, such as UEFA Champions League and UEFA Europa League)		Other (Note: Including other competitions, such as Albanian Supercup)		Total	
Club	Season	Division	Apps	Goals	Apps	Goals	Apps	Goals	Apps	Goals	Apps	Goals
Anorthosis Famagusta	2013–14	Cypriot First Division	3	0	—		—		—		3	0
Anorthosis Famagusta	2015–16	Cypriot First Division	0	0	1	0	—		—		1	0
Anorthosis Famagusta	Total		3	0	1	0	—		—		4	0
Elpida Xylofagou	2014–15	Cypriot Second Division	22	0	—		—		—		22	0
Skënderbeu Korçë	2016–17	Albanian Superliga	0	0	1	0	—		—		1	0
Skënderbeu Korçë	2017–18	Albanian Superliga	0	0	4	0	0 (Note: Appearances in the UEFA Europa League)	0	—		4	0
Skënderbeu Korçë	Total		0	0	5	0	0	0	—		5	0
Career total			3	0	6	0	0	0	—		9	0

== Honours ==
=== Club ===
Skënderbeu Korçë

- Albanian Cup Runner-up: 2016–17
- Albanian Supercup Runner-up: 2016

Dinamo

- Kupa e Shqipërisë
  - Winner:2024–25

Sporting positions
Preceded by Renato Malota	Albania U20 captain 2013	Succeeded by Shaqir Tafa
