= Geralb Smajli =

Albanian footballer

Personal information
- Full name: Geralb Smajli
- Date of birth: 16 May 2002 (age 24)
- Place of birth: Waregem, Belgium
- Position: Right back

Team information
- Current team: Egnatia
- Number: 2

Youth career
- 2012–2013: Djelmnia Shkodrane
- 2013–2014: Shkodra
- 2014–2017: Vllaznia
- 2017–2020: Shkëndija Tiranë
- 2020–2021: Vllaznia

Senior career*
Years	Team	Apps	(Gls)
2020–2024	Vllaznia	54	(1)
2021–2022	→ Vllaznia U21	6	(0)
2024–2026	Ballkani	53	(1)
2026–	Egnatia	0	(0)

International career
2021	Albania U20	2	(0)
2022	Albania U21	1	(1)
- * Club domestic league appearances and goals as of 19 February 2026

Geralb Smajli (born 16 May 2002) is a professional footballer who plays as a right back for Kategoria Superiore club Egnatia. Born in Belgium, he has represented Albania at youth level.

== Career ==
On 29 June 2021, he joined Kategoria Superiore side Vllaznia.

On 2 July 2024, he joined Kosovan side FC Ballkani on a 4-year contract.
