= Ilirjan =

- Gender: Male

Origin
- Region of origin: Albania, Kosovo

Other names
- Related names: Ilir

Ilirjan is an Albanian masculine given name and may refer to:

- Ilirjan Çaushaj (born 1987), Albanian footballer
- Ilirjan File (born 1969), Albanian footballer and coach
- Ilirjan Suli (born 1975), Albanian weightlifter
- Ilirjan Thaçi (1995–2013), Albanian footballer
