= Ilir Kastrati =

Albanian footballer

Personal information
- Full name: Ilir Kastrati
- Date of birth: 20 July 1994 (age 32)
- Place of birth: Tirana, Albania
- Position: Midfielder

Youth career
- 2003–2013: Panathinaikos

Senior career*
Years	Team	Apps	(Gls)
2013	Tirana	1	(0)
2014	→ Himara (loan)	10	(1)
2014–2016	Sopoti	44	(5)
2016–2017	Laçi	14	(0)
2017	Turbina	11	(0)

International career
2012	Albania U19	5	(1)
2013	Albania U20	5	(1)
- * Club domestic league appearances and goals

Ilir Kastrati (born 20 July 1994) is an Albanian professional footballer who most recently played as a midfielder for Turbina.

== Career ==
=== Early career ===
Kastrati was born in Tirana but moved to Greece as a young child along with his family, where he joined the Panathinaikos academy as a 9 year old in 2003. He remained at Panathinaikos until the summer of 2013, which is when he returned to Albania to play for his hometown club KF Tirana, signing a two-year contract on what was initially believed to be a free transfer. He struggled to make the first team under head coach Nevil Dede, and he managed just one substitute league appearance for 12 minutes which came against Kastrioti Krujë on 2 October 2013 in a 1–0 home win, as well as starting an Albanian Cup game against KF Albpetrol in a 1–0 loss later that month. During the winter break he was loaned out to Albanian First Division side KF Himara until the end of the 2013–14 season, where he was unable to help the club escape relegation to the third tier. He was soon released from his contract by Tirana but the club was taken to court by Kastrati's former side Panathinaikos who demanded compensation for the formation of the player in their academy. Tirana lost the trial and were ordered to pay Panathinaikos €120,000 in compensation, despite the player only featuring in 2 games for the club.

=== Sopoti ===
Following his release from Tirana Kastrati joined Albanian First Division side Sopoti Librazhd where he became an important first team player under head coach Gentian Stojku. He scored his first ever senior goal for the club in a 2–2 draw with Dinamo Tirana on 18 October 2014, as he went on to make 24 league appearances where he managed to score 5 goals, becoming the club's second highest goalscorer of the season as they finished 4th in Group B of the First Division. Even with the arrival of new head coach Ardi Bozhani Kastrati remained a first team regular but he failed to score in a season that saw his side struggle in the league, as they finished second from bottom in Group B of the First Division. His side faced Partizani Tirana B from the Albanian Second Division in a playoff to determine who would play in the First Division the following season, in a game which Partizani B won 4–1 but they fielded ineligible players from their first team, meaning Sopoti were awarded the win.

=== Laçi ===
Kastrati left Sopoti at the end of the 2015–16 season and he joined Albanian Superliga side KF Laçi in July 2016 on a free transfer.

=== Turbina ===
On 31 January 2017, he signed for Albanian club Turbina.

== International career ==
=== Albania U20 ===
Kastrati was called up at Albania national under-20 football team by coach Skënder Gega to participate in the 2013 Mediterranean Games football tournament which began on 19 June 2013 in Mersin, Turkey. He played as a substitute in the opening match and then managed to play in all 4 other Albania U20s matches for full 90-minutes. He scored 1 goal in the Classification 5–8 matches against Macedonia on 25 June as Albania lost 1–2. Albania U20 was ranked in the last place out of 8 teams.
