= Armando Visconti =

Italian footballer (born 1989)

Personal information
- Date of birth: 26 October 1989 (age 36)
- Place of birth: Naples, Italy
- Height: 1.74 m (5 ft 9 in)
- Position: Forward

Team information
- Current team: UC Bisceglie

Youth career
- Pomigliano d'Arco
- 2005–2007: Roma
- 2007–2008: Avellino

Senior career*
Years	Team	Apps	(Gls)
2008–2009	Avellino	9	(1)
2009–2013	Bari	4	(0)
2010–2011	→ Campobasso (loan)	19	(3)
2012	→ Vibonese (loan)	14	(3)
2013	Bisceglie		
2013–2014	Vallée d'Aoste		
2014–2015	RapalloBogliasco		
2015–2017	Altamura		
2017–	UC Bisceglie		

International career
2009	Italy U20	2	(0)
- * Club domestic league appearances and goals as of 2 March 2013

Armando Visconti (born 26 October 1989) is an Italian footballer who plays for the amateur side UC Bisceglie.

Visconti started his career at Pomigliano d'Arco before joining A.S. Roma Allievi Nazionali team in 2005. A year later he was promoted to the Primavera team. In 2007, he joined Avellino, of Serie B.

After Avellino's bankruptcy in July 2009, he was signed by Bari. After a season on loan, Visconti returned to Bari at the start of 2011–12 Serie B. However, he failed to play any game for the first team. In January 2012 Visconti left the club again.

Visconti wore no.98 shirt for Bari.

Visconti played for Italy U20 team at the 2009 Mediterranean Games.
