= Ilir Kadia =

Albanian journalist

- Born: 4 October 1957 (age 67); Albania
- Occupation(s): Writer, journalist

Ilir Kadia (born 4 October 1957) is a journalist from Albania. He has been working for the BBC World Service since 1993. His book Floke te Lagur (Wet Hair), a collection of short stories, came as a surprise to the Albanian public in 2004. The book was praised by the literary world as well as the public - described as "the stories have by now become part of the reader's patrimony." Since then Kadia has published two other books titled Kontrate per Kadaver (Cadaver Contract), and Nata e pare e tradhetise (First Night of Treason). All the books are composed of 20 short stories on umpteen topics of Albanian life.
