= Orjan Xhemalaj =

Albanian footballer

Personal information
- Full name: Orjan Xhemalaj
- Date of birth: 7 June 1989 (age 37)
- Place of birth: Ballsh, Albania
- Position: Midfielder

Team information
- Current team: Vora
- Number: 8

Youth career
- 2002–2007: Teuta Durrës

Senior career*
Years	Team	Apps	(Gls)
2007–2011	Teuta	48	(1)
2011–2012	Dinamo Tirana	14	(0)
2012–2014	Kamza	30	(1)
2015–2016	Erzeni	24	(2)
2016	Besëlidhja	10	(1)
2017–2019	Erzeni	60	(7)
2019	Teuta	0	(0)
2020	Erzeni	9	(1)
2020–2021	Egnatia	18	(1)
2021–2022	Erzeni	30	(1)
2022–	Vora	5	(0)

International career
2008–2009	Albania U20	1	(0)
- * Club domestic league appearances and goals as of 19:02, 11 October 2023 (UTC)

Orjan Xhemalaj (born 7 June 1989 in Ballsh) is an Albanian professional footballer who currently plays for KF Vora in the Kategoria e Parë.

== Career ==
=== Club career ===
On 30 July 2019 KF Teuta Durrës confirmed, that Xhemalaj had returned to the club. Having only made one appearance for Teuta, he left the club at the end of the year and returned to KF Erzeni in January 2020.
