= Ilir Biturku =

Albanian retired footballer

Personal information
- Date of birth: 4 February 1968 (age 58)
- Place of birth: Kavajë, PR Albania
- Position: Defender

Team information
- Current team: Albania U-20 (head coach)

Senior career*
Years	Team	Apps	(Gls)
1990–1991	Besa	33	(2)
1992–1994	Besa	53	(6)
1994	Partizani	14	(1)
1995–1998	Besa	62	(3)

Managerial career
- 2009: Besa
- 2014: Teuta
- 2018–: Albania U-20
- * Club domestic league appearances and goals

Ilir Biturku (born 4 February 1968) is an Albanian retired footballer who is the current head coach of Albania U-20.

== Playing career ==
=== Club ===
Biturku played most of his career as defender for Besa Kavajë and Partizani Tirana.

== Managerial career ==
He also served as assistant manager of the Albania national under-17 football team. He was manager of Teuta in 2014 and later became technical director and assistant to Gentian Begeja. He was dismissed along with Begeja in June 2018. In December 2018 he was named head coach of the Albania national under-20 football team.
