= Ardit Shehaj =

Albanian professional footballer (born 1990)

Personal information
- Full name: Ardit Shehaj
- Date of birth: 23 September 1990 (age 36)
- Place of birth: Vlorë, Albania
- Height: 1.84 m (6 ft 0 in)
- Positions: Midfielder; forward

Team information
- Current team: Flamurtari Pristina

Youth career
- 2000–2007: Flamurtari Vlorë

Senior career*
| Years | Team | Apps | (Gls) |
| 2007–2017 | Flamurtari Vlorë | 190 | (17) |
| 2012 | → Pogradeci (loan) | 2 | (0) |
| 2012–2013 | → Kastrioti (loan) | 19 | (2) |
| 2017 | Teuta Durrës | 10 | (1) |
| 2018– | Flamurtari Pristina | | |

International career^{‡}
| 2005–2007 | Albania U17 | 5 | (0) |
| 2009 | Albania U20 | 2 | (1) |
| 2008–2010 | Albania U21 | 2 | (0) |
- * Club domestic league appearances and goals as of 28 October 2017 ‡ National team caps and goals as of 31 July 2015

Ardit Shehaj (born 23 September 1990) is an Albanian professional footballer who plays as a striker for Kosovan club Flamurtari Pristina in the Football Superleague of Kosovo.

== Club career ==
On 24 January 2012, Shehaj was sent on loan to fellow Albanian Superliga team Pogradeci until the end of the season. During his spell there, Shehaj appeared in two league matches as Pogradeci finished 13th which resulted in relegation to the Albanian First Division.

On 22 October 2014, in the returning match of the first round of the 2014–15 Albanian Cup, Shehaj scored a hat-trick against the underdogs of KS Kamza, leading the team to pass the round with the aggregate 5–0 after the first match finished scoreless.

In the 2015–16 season, Shehaj scored a hat-trick in the first round of the Albanian Cup in a 3–2 win against KF Oriku, which was followed by another hat-trick in the next round against Tërbuni Pukë, where Flamurtari won 5–0 to go on to the quarter-final.

On 11 September 2016, during the 5–0 home win against Luftëtari Gjirokastër in the second matchday of the 2016–17 Albanian Superliga season, Shehaj scored the fifth goal of the match, his first league strike since April 2015. It was also his 200th appearance in all competitions for the club. Later on 18 December, Shehaj scored the lone goal in the home match against Laçi by finishing home a Bruno Telushi cross, leading the team to their third league win in their last five matches. It was Flamurtari's first home over Laçi in six years.

Following the end of 2016–17 season where Flamurtari barely avoided relegation by just one point, Shehaj confirmed that he was going to stay at the club for the next season as he was in coach Shpëtim Duro's plans.

However, one month later, on 14 July 2017, Shehaj was sold to Teuta Durrës, signing a two-year contract, leaving Flamurtari after ten years of service. His debut on 9 September brought his first goal for the club as well, as his late header was the winner for Teuta who defeated Luftëtari Gjirokastër in the opening week of the championship.

In January 2018, Shehaj joined Flamurtari Prishtina in the Football Superleague of Kosovo.

== International career ==
Shehaj has been a former Albania youth international, representing his country at under-17, u-20 and u-21 levels.

== Style of play ==
Usually a striker, Shehaj has been deployed as central midfielder by the coach Gentian Mezani.

== Career statistics ==
=== Club ===
As of 9 September 2017

| Club | Season | League | | | Cup | | Continental | | Other | | Total | |
| Club | Season | Division | Apps | Goals | Apps | Goals | Apps | Goals | Apps | Goals | Apps | Goals |
|---|---|---|---|---|---|---|---|---|---|---|---|---|
| Flamurtari Vlorë | 2006–07 | Albanian Superliga | 2 | 1 | 0 | 0 | — | | — | | 2 | 1 |
| Flamurtari Vlorë | 2007–08 | Albanian Superliga | 12 | 0 | 0 | 0 | — | | — | | 12 | 0 |
| Flamurtari Vlorë | 2008–09 | Albanian Superliga | 26 | 3 | 7 | 3 | — | | — | | 33 | 6 |
| Flamurtari Vlorë | 2009–10 | Albanian Superliga | 19 | 2 | 0 | 0 | 2 (Note: All appearance(s) in UEFA Europa League) | 0 | — | | 21 | 2 |
| Flamurtari Vlorë | 2010–11 | Albanian Superliga | 21 | 2 | 3 | 0 | — | | — | | 24 | 2 |
| Flamurtari Vlorë | 2011–12 | Albanian Superliga | 8 | 0 | 3 | 1 | 4 | 2 | — | | 15 | 3 |
| Flamurtari Vlorë | 2013–14 | Albanian Superliga | 24 | 4 | 8 | 2 | — | | — | | 32 | 6 |
| Flamurtari Vlorë | 2014–15 | Albanian Superliga | 23 | 3 | 4 | 5 | 4 | 1 | 1 (Note: Appearance in Albanian Supercup) | 0 | 32 | 9 |
| Flamurtari Vlorë | 2015–16 | Albanian Superliga | 22 | 0 | 5 | 6 | — | | — | | 27 | 6 |
| Flamurtari Vlorë | 2016–17 | Albanian Superliga | 33 | 2 | 4 | 0 | — | | — | | 37 | 2 |
| Flamurtari Vlorë | Total | | 190 | 17 | 34 | 17 | 10 | 3 | 1 | 0 | 235 | 37 |
| Pogradeci (loan) | 2011–12 | Albanian Superliga | 2 | 0 | 0 | 0 | — | | — | | 2 | 0 |
| Kastrioti Krujë (loan) | 2012–13 | Albanian Superliga | 19 | 2 | 7 | 0 | — | | — | | 26 | 2 |
| Teuta Durrës | 2017–18 | Albanian Superliga | 1 | 1 | 0 | 0 | — | | — | | 1 | 1 |
| Teuta Durrës | Total | | 1 | 1 | 0 | 0 | — | | — | | 1 | 1 |
| Career total | | | 212 | 20 | 41 | 17 | 10 | 3 | 1 | 0 | 264 | 40 |

== Honours ==
=== Club ===
Flamurtari Vlorë

- Albanian Cup: 2008–09, 2013–14
