= Klaudio Hyseni =

Albanian footballer

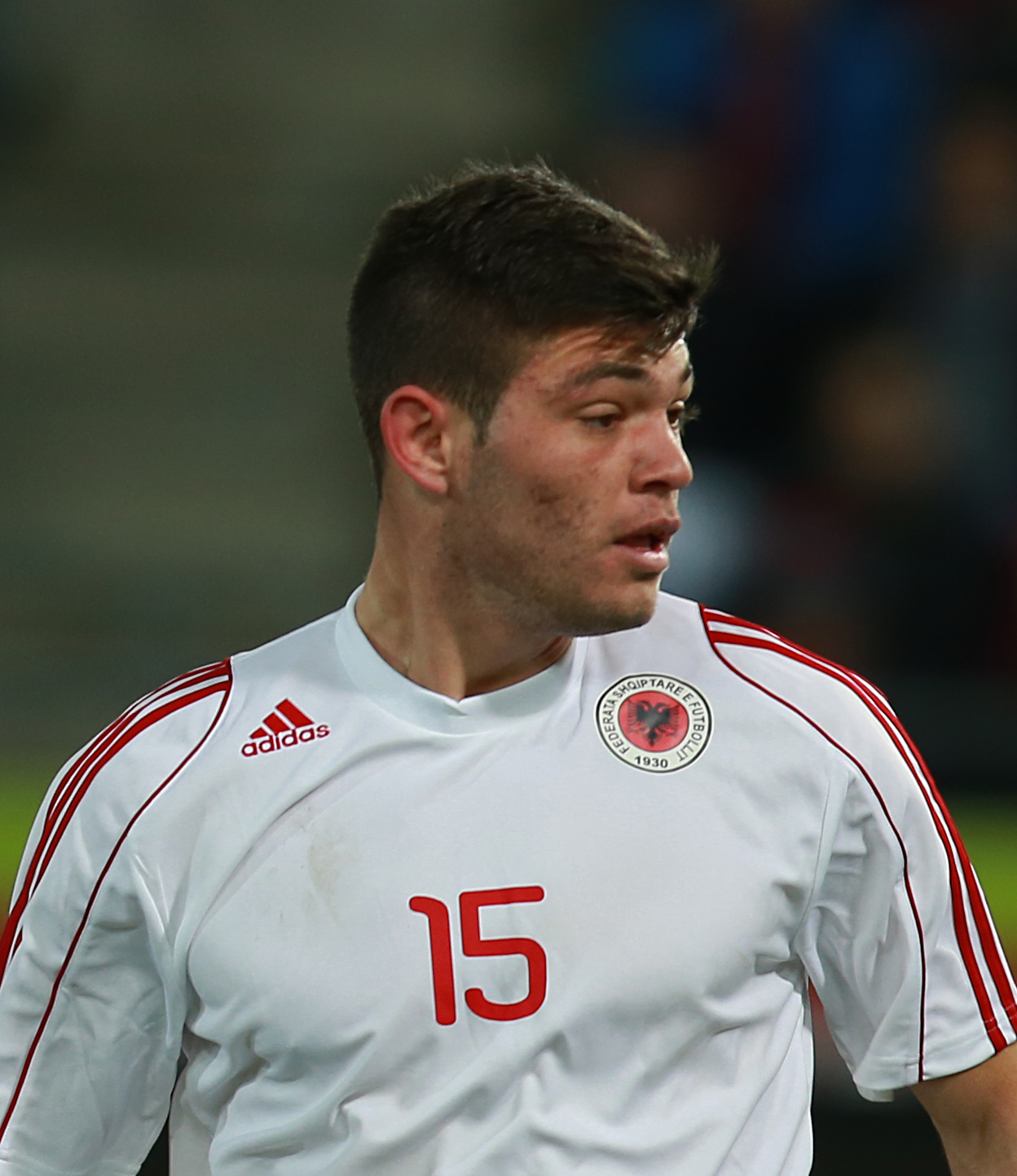

Personal information
- Full name: Klaudio Hyseni
- Date of birth: 15 July 1994 (age 32)
- Place of birth: Tirana, Albania
- Position: Midfielder

Team information
- Current team: Dinamo Tirana
- Number: 19

Youth career
- 2011–2013: Shkëndija Tiranë

Senior career*
Years	Team	Apps	(Gls)
2013–2014	Skënderbeu	4	(0)
2014–2016	Teuta Durrës	42	(3)
2016–2017	Erzeni	9	(1)
2017	Besa Kavajë	11	(1)
2017–2018	Korabi	25	(4)
2018–2019	Burreli	23	(3)
2019–2020	Tërbuni	22	(3)
2020–	Dinamo Tirana	0	(0)

International career
2013–2014	Albania U19	4	(1)
2014–2015	Albania U21	4	(0)
- * Club domestic league appearances and goals as of 7 December 2019

Klaudio Hyseni (born 15 July 1994) is an Albanian professional footballer who played for Dinamo Tirana in the Albanian First Division.

== Career ==
=== Early career ===
Hyseni is a graduate of the Sports mastery school Loro Boriçi, and played for the school's football team Shkëndija Tiranë as a teenager, where he was part of the team that won the 2012-13 national under-19s championship. Following an impressive season with the Shkëndija Tiranë U19s, where he scored 6 goals in 28 games and where he was also the club captain, he attracted the attention of Albanian Superliga clubs and eventually joined the Albanian champions Skënderbeu Korçë in the summer of 2013.

=== Skënderbeu ===
He was presented as a Skënderbeu Korçë player in July 2013 alongside Leonit Abazi. He joined the senior team for the 2013-14 campaign but found chances limited due to his age and lack of experience. He was an unused substitute in a 1–0 away win against Kastrioti Krujë on 27 October 2013. He made his senior competitive debut in the Albanian Cup against Iliria Fushë-Krujë on 6 November 2013 in an 8–0 win over the third-tier side. Hyseni started the game in midfield and played the entire 90 minutes of the game.

== International career ==
Shortly after signing for Skënderbeu Korçë he was chosen to represent Albania at the 2013 Mediterranean Games in Mersin, Turkey. He played in 4 games in the tournament and scored in the final game against Italy in a 3–1 loss, which meant that Albania finished last in the tournament.
