= Arsen Sykaj =

Albanian footballer

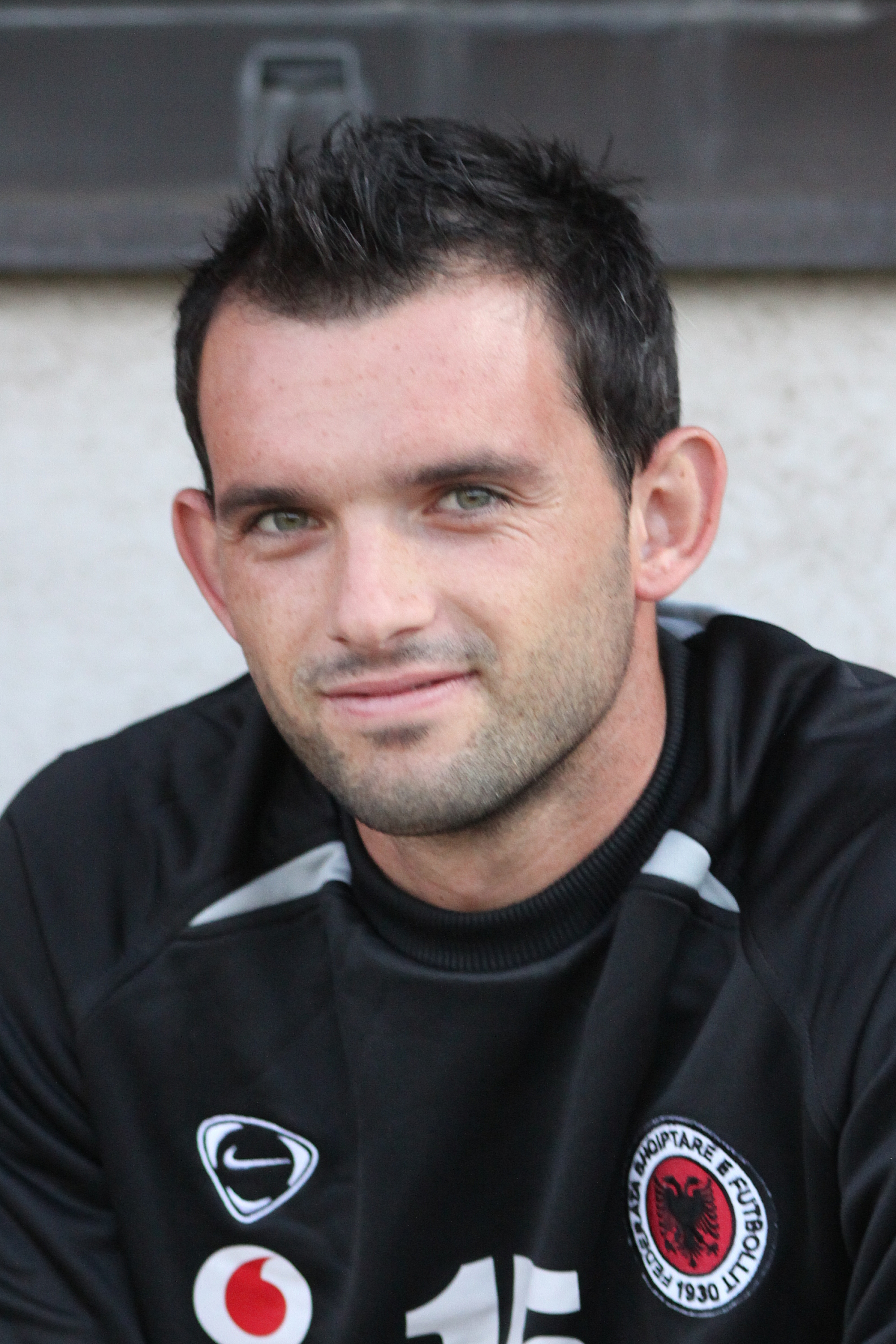
- Sykaj with Albania U21

Personal information
- Date of birth: 16 April 1990 (age 36)
- Place of birth: Shkodër, Albania
- Height: 1.90 m (6 ft 3 in)
- Position: Centre-back

Team information
- Current team: Borgorosso Molfetta

Youth career
- 2000–2007: Vllaznia Shkodër

Senior career*
Years	Team	Apps	(Gls)
2007–2012	Vllaznia	57	(1)
2012–2013	Kastrioti	22	(1)
2013–2015	Vllaznia	60	(0)
2015–2016	Besëlidhja	25	(0)
2016–2017	Sopoti	11	(1)
2017–2018	Teuta	21	(0)
2018–2019	Drenica	54	(2)
2022–	Borgorosso Molfetta		

International career
2008–2009	Albania U-19	3	(0)
2009	Albania U-20	1	(0)
2010–2012	Albania U-21	13	(1)
- * Club domestic league appearances and goals as of 2 December 2019

Arsen Sykaj (born 16 April 1990) is an Albanian professional footballer who plays as a centre-back for Borgorosso Molfetta in the Italian fifth-tier Eccellenza.

== Club career ==
=== Early career ===
Born in Shkodër, Sykaj is a product of the Vllaznia Shkodër academy, where he took his first steps into football by joining his hometown club in 1997 at the age of 8. He progressed through the youth ranks at the club and eventually played for the under-17s before joining the under-19s, where he became a key player and impressed the coaches enough to earn him a call up to the senior team in 2007 to train with the first team players whilst still playing for the under-19s side.

=== Tërbuni Pukë ===
Sykaj was loaned out to Albanian First Division side Tërbuni Pukë at the beginning of the 2008–09 season in order to gain first team experience. Upon his arrival at Tërbuni he immediately became an important first team player as a centre back. His loan deal at the club expired prematurely in March 2009 following Tërbuni Pukë's disqualification from the First Division, thus leading to Sykaj's return to his parent club Vllaznia.

=== Vllaznia ===
Following his return to Vllaznia, Sykaj became a first team player and he featured in 16 games during the 2009–10 season, 11 of which were substitute appearances. He also featured in Vllaznia's Albanian Cup run, which saw his side finish as runners-up, after being defeated by Besa Kavajë in the final. Sykaj played in the first leg of the quarter-finals as well as the second leg of the semi-finals, but did not feature in the final. The following season, he established himself further as a first team player, featuring in 22 league games, 20 of which were as a starting player, as he helped his side reach 3rd and earn a Europa League qualifying place.

=== Besëlidhja Lezhë ===
In the summer transfer window Sykaj, together with Arsen Hajdari left Albanian Superliga side Vllaznia to join the Albanian First Division team Besëlidhja which its primary priority was to reach promotion to highest division. He played the full-time at the first match of the 2015–16 season against newly promoted team Korabi Peshkopi winning the match 1–0.

=== Teuta Durrës ===
On 16 January 2017, Sykaj returned to top flight by completing a transfer to Teuta Durrës for an undisclosed fee. He made his competitive debut on 5 February as a substitute in the matchday 20 against Kukësi and finished the second part of 2016–17 season with 12 matches, including 11 in league, collecting 786 minutes. On 21 January 2018, Sukaj left the club by terminating the contract by mutual consent after having find difficulties to play regularly in the first part of 2017–18 season.

=== Drenica ===
On 28 January 2018, Sykaj moved for the first time aboard and joined the Football Superleague of Kosovo club Drenica.

== International career ==
=== Youth team ===
Sykaj has been a former Albanian international, having represented under-19, -20 and -21.

=== Senior team ===
Sykaj was first called up to the senior Albania team on 30 September 2011 by Josip Kuže for the last two Euro 2012 qualifying games against France and Romania.
