= Vilfor Hysa =

Albanian footballer

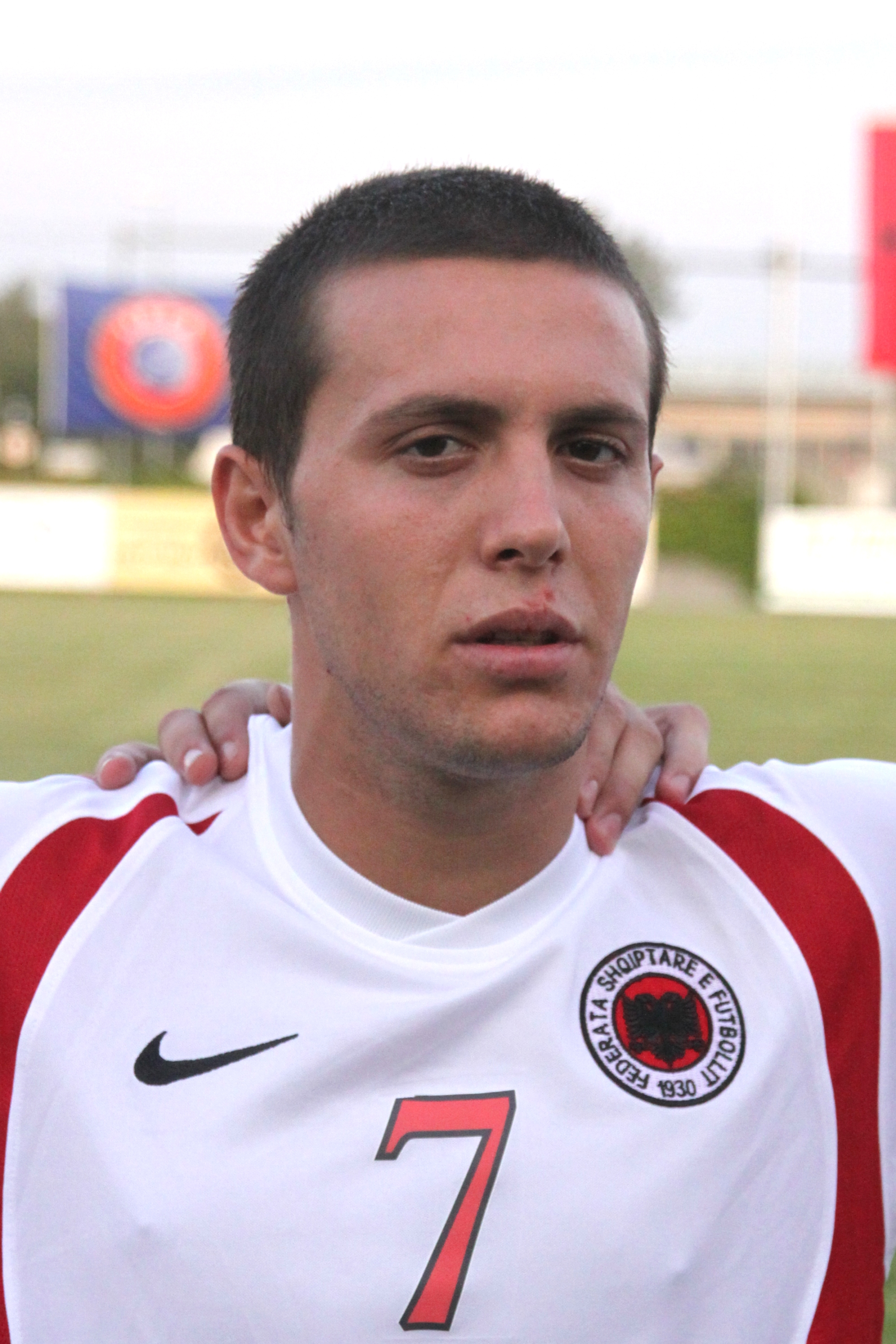

Personal information
- Full name: Vilfor Hysa
- Date of birth: 9 September 1989 (age 37)
- Place of birth: Tirana, Albania
- Height: 1.73 m (5 ft 8 in)
- Position: Forward

Team information
- Current team: Lushnja

Youth career
- 2000–2006: Tirana

Senior career*
| Years | Team | Apps | (Gls) |
| 2006–2007 | Tirana | 5 | (0) |
| 2007–2010 | Teuta Durrës | 80 | (18) |
| 2010–2012 | Laçi | 42 | (18) |
| 2011–2012 | → Flamurtari (loan) | 13 | (5) |
| 2012 | Vllaznia Shkodër | 10 | (1) |
| 2012–2013 | Kastrioti | 11 | (2) |
| 2013–2015 | Kukësi | 50 | (11) |
| 2015–2016 | Kastrioti | 25 | (10) |
| 2016–2017 | Kamza | 22 | (1) |
| 2017–2018 | Grosseto | | |
| 2018 | Lija Athletic | 7 | (0) |
| 2018–2019 | Gjilani | 23 | (4) |
| 2019–2020 | Drenica | 2 | (1) |
| 2020 | Dinamo Tirana | 10 | (4) |
| 2020– | Lushnja | 5 | (1) |

International career
| 2004–2005 | Albania U17 | 3 | (0) |
| 2006–2007 | Albania U19 | 6 | (0) |
| 2008–2009 | Albania U20 | 1 | (0) |
| 2009–2011 | Albania U21 | 6 | (2) |
- * Club domestic league appearances and goals as of 15:58, 12 December 2020 (UTC)

Vilfor Hysa (born 9 September 1989) is an Albanian professional footballer who plays as a forward for KF Lushnja.

== Club career ==
Hysa joined Vllaznia Shkodër on 24 July 2012 by signing a one-year contract for an undisclosed fee.

He was loaned to Flamurtari Vlorë on a six-month deal, which ended in January 2012. He returned to his parent club Laçi on 27 January. Following his return, Hysa accused Flamurtari Vlorë manager Shkëlqim Muça of being the main reason for his departure from the team.

In summer 2013, Hysa signed a one-year contract with Kukësi, with an option to expand it for a further year. He announced his departure on 10 August 2015, following the expiration of his contract with the club.

On 1 September 2015, Hysa returned to Kastrioti Krujë, this time in Albanian First Division, by signing a one-year deal.

On 22 July 2018, Hysa moved to Kosovo where he signed with top flight side Gjilani.

== International career ==
Internationally, he has represented his country at U17, U19, U20 and U21 levels, but has yet to feature for the senior national team.

== Career statistics ==
As of 21 April 2018

Club statistics
| Club | Season | League | | | Cup | | Europe | | Total | |
| Club | Season | Division | Apps | Goals | Apps | Goals | Apps | Goals | Apps | Goals |
|---|---|---|---|---|---|---|---|---|---|---|
| Tirana | 2006–07 | Albanian Superliga | 1 | 0 | 0 | 0 | — | | 1 | 0 |
| Teuta Durrës | 2007–08 | Albanian Superliga | 30 | 5 | 0 | 0 | — | | 30 | 5 |
| Teuta Durrës | 2008–09 | Albanian Superliga | 29 | 9 | 2 | 0 | — | | 34 | 16 |
| Teuta Durrës | 2009–10 | Albanian Superliga | 21 | 5 | 4 | 0 | — | | 34 | 16 |
| Teuta Durrës | Total | | 80 | 19 | 6 | 0 | — | | 84 | 19 |
| Tirana | 2010–11 | Albanian Superliga | 0 | 0 | 0 | 0 | 2 (Note: All appearance(s) in UEFA Europa League) | 0 | 2 | 0 |
| KF Laçi | 2010–11 | Albanian Superliga | 31 | 13 | 2 | 0 | — | | 33 | 13 |
| KF Laçi | 2011–12 | Albanian Superliga | 11 | 5 | 6 | 0 | — | | 17 | 5 |
| KF Laçi | Total | | 42 | 18 | 8 | 0 | — | | 50 | 18 |
| Flamurtari Vlorë (loan) | 2011–12 | Albanian Superliga | 13 | 5 | 5 | 3 | — | | 18 | 8 |
| Vllaznia Shkodër | 2012–13 | Albanian Superliga | 10 | 1 | 4 | 1 | — | | 14 | 2 |
| Kastrioti Krujë | 2012–13 | Albanian Superliga | 11 | 2 | 1 | 0 | — | | 12 | 2 |
| Kukësi | 2013–14 | Albanian Superliga | 20 | 5 | 7 | 3 | 0 | 0 | 27 | 8 |
| Kukësi | 2014–15 | Albanian Superliga | 31 | 6 | 5 | 2 | 1 | 0 | 37 | 8 |
| Kukësi | 2015–16 | Albanian Superliga | 0 | 0 | 0 | 0 | 1 | 0 | 1 | 0 |
| Kukësi | Total | | 51 | 11 | 12 | 5 | 2 | 0 | 65 | 16 |
| Kastrioti Krujë | 2015–16 | Albanian First Division | 25 | 10 | 2 | 0 | — | | 27 | 10 |
| Kamza | 2016–17 | Albanian First Division | 22 | 1 | 3 | 0 | — | | 25 | 1 |
| Lija Athletic | 2017–18 | Maltese Premier League | 7 | 0 | 1 | 0 | — | | 8 | 0 |
| Career total | | | 262 | 67 | 38 | 9 | 4 | 0 | 304 | 76 |

== Honours ==
Kamza

- Albanian First Division: 2016–17
