= Julius Perstaller =

Austrian footballer (born 1989)

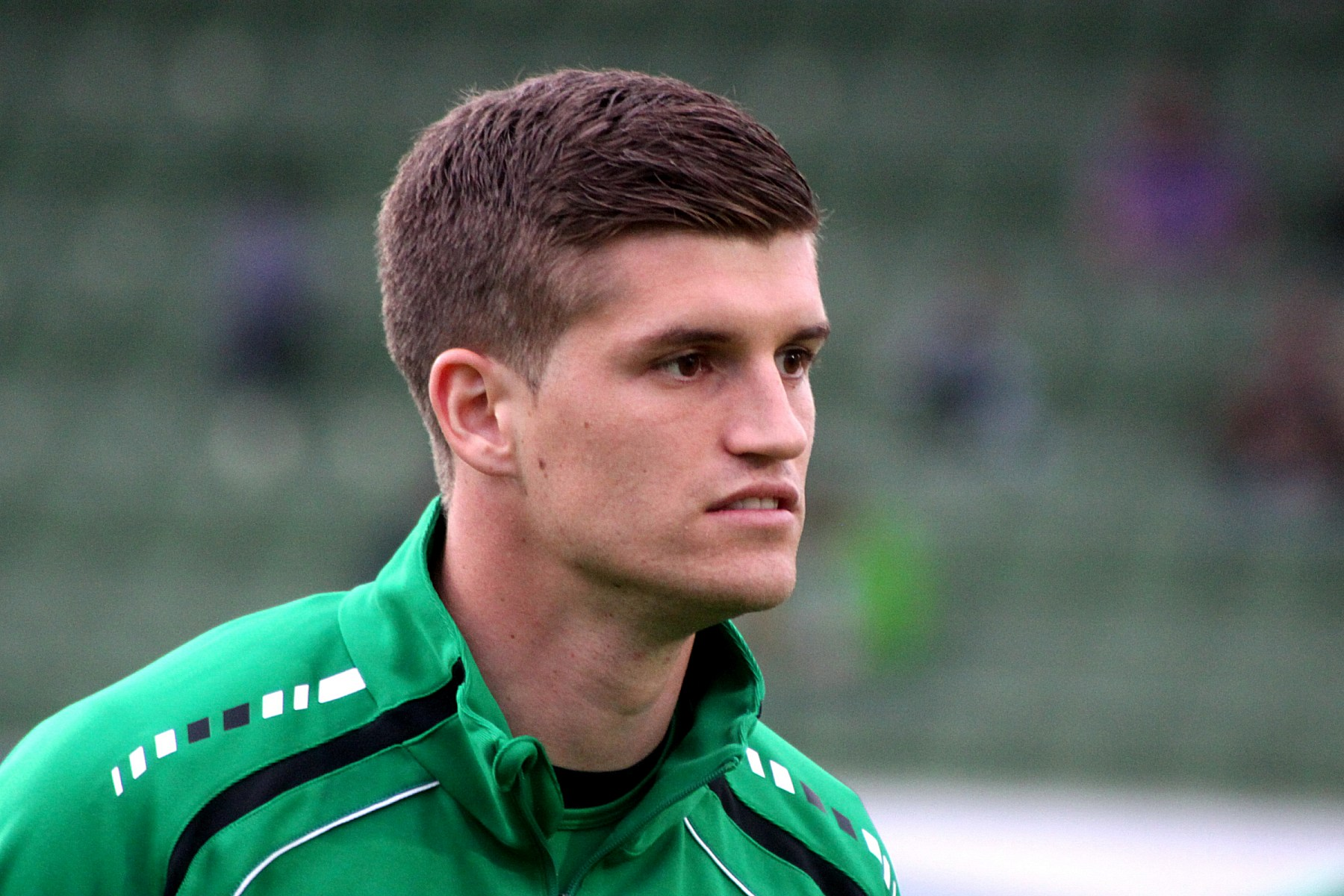

Personal information
- Date of birth: 8 April 1989 (age 37)
- Place of birth: Innsbruck, Austria
- Height: 1.79 m (5 ft 10 1/2 in)
- Position: Forward

Team information
- Current team: SV Telfs
- Number: 10

Youth career
- 1995–2006: BNZ Tirol

Senior career*
Years	Team	Apps	(Gls)
2006–2013	FC Wacker Innsbruck	140	(37)
2006–2007	→ WSG Wattens	11	(4)
2007–2008	→ SV Hall (loan)	10	(4)
2013–2015	SV Ried	49	(9)
2015–2016	Hansa Rostock	23	(1)
2016	Hansa Rostock II	4	(2)
2016–2019	SV Elversberg	83	(17)
2017–2018	SV Elversberg II	4	(1)
2019–2020	FC Zirl		
2020–	SV Telfs		

International career^{‡}
2007	Austria U-19	2	(0)
2008	Austria U-20	4	(1)
2009–2010	Austria U-21	8	(1)
- * Club domestic league appearances and goals as of 12:50, 14 September 2020 (UTC) ‡ National team caps and goals as of 9 September 2011

Julius Perstaller (born 8 April 1989) is a professional footballer who plays as a forward for SV Telfs.

== Life and career ==
Julius came through the youth system at FC Wacker Innsbruck, playing for the affiliated junior team BNZ Tirol.

After two seasons with Austrian Regional League sides WSG Wattens and SV Hall, Julius has played in the FC Wacker Innsbruck first team in the First League (2008–10) and the Bundesliga (2010–11). In April–May 2010 he scored in six consecutive games for the club.

Julius has also gained international recognition at under-21 level. He scored his first goal for the Austria under-21s in a 2–2 draw with Albania under-21s in a November 2009 qualifying match for the 2011 UEFA European Under-21 Football Championship.

== Honours ==
FC Wacker Innsbruck:

Winner

- Austrian Football First League: 2009–10
