= Klodian Gino =

Albanian association football player

Klodian Gjino
Personal information
- Full name: Klodian Dimitrios Gjino
- Date of birth: 13 February 1994 (age 32)
- Place of birth: Berat, Albania
- Height: 1.81 m (5 ft 11 in)
- Position: Midfielder

Team information
- Current team: Haidari

Youth career
- –2014: Olympiacos

Senior career*
Years	Team	Apps	(Gls)
2014	Olympiacos	0	(0)
2014	→ Fostiras (loan)	21	(1)
2014–2015	Aris	12	(0)
2015	Panargiakos	12	(4)
2016	Kalamata	10	(0)
2016–2018	Panachaiki	22	(0)
2018–2020	Apollon Smyrnis	28	(0)
2020–2021	Ionikos	0	(0)
2021	Chania	10	(0)
2021–2022	Proodeftiki	0	(0)
2022	Panionios	6	(0)
2022–2023	Rodos	8	(1)
2023	Panionios	13	(0)
2023–2024	Peramaikos	15	(0)
2024	Ypato	11	(0)
2024–2025	Saronikos Anavyssou		
2025–	Haidari		

International career^{‡}
2012	Albania U19	8	(1)
2013–2015	Albania U21	14	(1)
- * Club domestic league appearances and goals as of 27 July 2023 ‡ National team caps and goals as of 28 March 2015

Klodian Gjino (born 13 February 1994) is an Albanian professional footballer who plays as a midfielder for Haidari.
