= Ganiol Kaçuli =

Albanian footballer

Personal information
- Date of birth: 22 September 1989 (age 37)
- Place of birth: Elbasan, Albania
- Position: Defender

Youth career
- Elbasani

Senior career*
Years	Team	Apps	(Gls)
2008–2017	Elbasani	85	(1)
2012	→ Shkumbini (loan)	8	(0)

International career
2009	Albania U21	1	(0)
- * Club domestic league appearances and goals as of 24 August 2014

Ganiol Kaçuli (born 22 September 1989 in Elbasan) is an Albanian professional footballer who most recently played for KF Elbasani in the Albanian Superliga.

== Honours ==
KF Elbasani

- Albanian First Division (1): 2013-14
