= Ibrahim Bejte =

Albanian footballer

Personal information
- Full name: Ibrahim Petrit Bejte
- Date of birth: 5 September 1989 (age 37)
- Place of birth: Lushnjë, Albania
- Height: 1.90 m (6 ft 3 in)
- Position: Goalkeeper

Team information
- Current team: Lushnja
- Number: 1

Youth career
- 2005–2007: Lushnja

Senior career*
Years	Team	Apps	(Gls)
2007–2009	Lushnja	24	(0)
2009–2011	Shkumbini	46	(0)
2011–2012	Lushnja	27	(0)
2012–2014	Besa	30	(0)
2014–2015	Kukësi	0	(0)
2015–2016	Besëlidhja	38	(0)
2016	Flamurtari	0	(0)
2016–2017	Sopoti	10	(0)
2017–2019	Lushnja	28	(0)

International career
2008–2009	Albania U20	1	(0)
- * Club domestic league appearances and goals as of 3 December 2017

Ibrahim Arjan Bejte (born 15 September 1989 in Lushnjë) is an Albanian footballer. He played for several teams in the Kategoria Superiore and the Kategoria e Parë between 2009 and 2019.
