= Klodian Xhelilaj =

Albanian footballer

Personal information
- Full name: Klodian Xhelilaj
- Date of birth: 23 November 1988 (age 37)
- Place of birth: Vlorë, Albania
- Position: Goalkeeper

Youth career
- 2000–2007: Flamurtari Vlorë

Senior career*
Years	Team	Apps	(Gls)
2007–2016	Flamurtari	32	(0)
2010–2011	→ KF Vlora (loan)	25	(0)
2011	→ Apolonia (loan)	10	(0)
2012	→ Himara (loan)	11	(0)
2016	Bylis	1	(0)
- * Club domestic league appearances and goals as of 7 July 2014

Klodian Xhelilaj (born 23 November 1988, in Vlorë) is an Albanian football player who most recently played as a goalkeeper for Bylis Ballsh in the Albanian First Division.

== Honours ==
=== Flamurtari ===
- Albanian Cup (2): 2008–09, 2013–14
- Kupa Birra Norga (1): 2007
- Kupa Pavarësia (1): 2009
- Kupa Mbarëkombëtare (1): 2009
