= Albania national youth football team =

The Albania national youth football teams are a group of seven (formerly eight) teams that represents Albania in association football at various specific age levels, ranging from under-15 to under-21 (formerly to under-23). All of the teams are controlled by Albanian Football Federation, the governing body for football in Albania.

The seven (formerly eight) teams are the following:

- Albania national under-23 football team (defunct)
- Albania national under-21 football team
- Albania national under-20 football team
- Albania national under-19 football team
- Albania national under-18 football team
- Albania national under-17 football team
- Albania national under-16 football team
- Albania national under-15 football team
