= Klodian Semina =

Albanian footballer

Klodian Samina
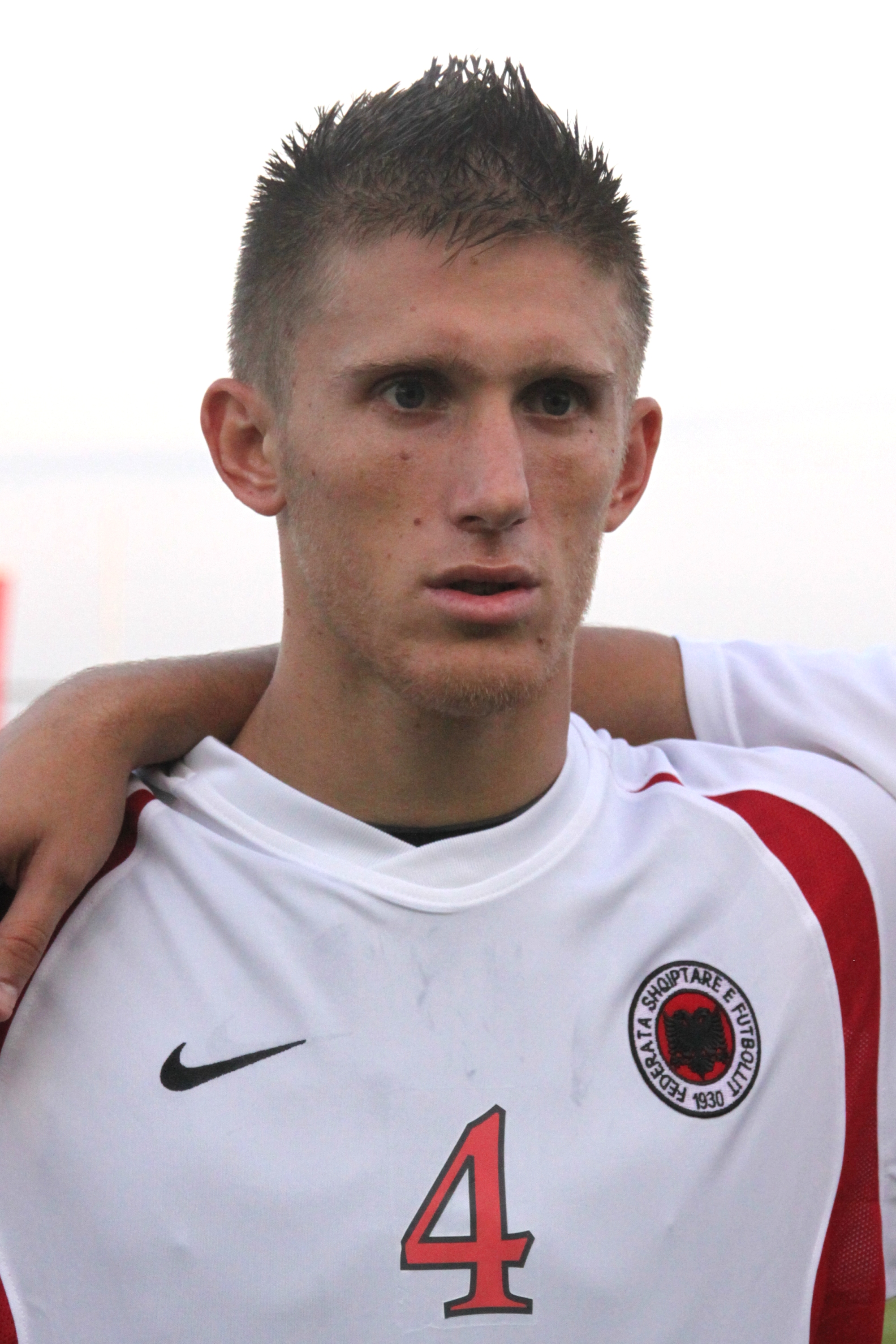
- Semina with Albania U21

Personal information
- Date of birth: 19 January 1989 (age 37)
- Place of birth: Shkodër, Albania
- Height: 1.94 m (6 ft 4 in)
- Position: Centre-back

Team information
- Current team: Borgomanero

Youth career
- 2000–2005: Vllaznia

Senior career*
Years	Team	Apps	(Gls)
2005–2007	Vllaznia	2	(0)
2008–2009	Belasitsa Petrich	25	(1)
2009–2010	Gramozi	24	(1)
2010–2011	Vllaznia	5	(0)
2011–2012	Locarno	25	(1)
2012–2014	Vllaznia	27	(1)
2014	Ascona		
2015–2017	Besëlidhja	38	(2)
2016	→ Sirnach (loan)	12	(1)
2017–2018	Ascona	18	(1)
2018–2019	OltrepòVoghera	23	(0)
2019	Pavia		
2019–	Borgomanero		

International career
2007–2008	Albania U19	6	(0)
2009	Albania U21	6	(0)
- * Club domestic league appearances and goals as of 20:12, 29 April 2020 (UTC)

Klodian Semina (also spelled Samina, born 19 January 1989) is an Albanian footballer who plays as a centre-back for A.S.D.C. Borgomanero in the Italian fifth tier.

== Club career ==
=== Early career ===
Semina is a Vllaznia Shkodër product, joining with them in 2000 when he was 11 years old. He was promoted to the first team during the 2005–06 season, being an unused substitute for the entire season. In the next season, Semina was able to make his Albanian Superliga debut, playing two matches throughout the 2006–07 season.

=== Belasitsa Petrich ===
On 1 February 2008, Semina moved for the first time outside the country, signing a two-year deal with Bulgarian side Belasitsa Petrich. He played with the club during the 2008–09 season, recording 25 matches and 1 goal, in the Bulgarian top flight.

=== Gramozi Ersekë ===
Semina returned in Albania in the summer of 2009 and on 1 August 2009, he signed a one-year deal with Gramozi Ersekë, who were set to play their first Albanian Superliga season in history.

=== Ermis Aradippou ===
On 13 May 2010, Semina signed a three-year contract with Cypriot side Ermis Aradippou, leaving Gramozi Ersekë after only one season. The told to the media that was very happy for this transfer, by saying: "I'm happy that I was able to reach an argument with the Cypriot directors and can say that their terms are very good."

=== Locarno ===
On 9 July 2011, Semina left Vllaznia Shkodër and signed with Swiss club Locarno in Challenge League. His debuted with the club on 25 July in team's opening match, playing full-90 minutes at Stadion Niedermatten. His debut was not one to celebrate as Locarno lost the match 5–2 to start the campaign in the worst way possible.

=== Besëlidhja Lezhë ===
In January 2015, during the winter transfer window, after being a free agent for almost one year, Semina signed a six-month contract with Albanian First Division side Besëlidhja Lezhë for an undisclosed fee. He made his debut with the club on 7 February 2015, playing full-90 minutes in a goalless draw against the league contenders of Tërbuni Pukë. That was his first match in a football field after 364 days since leaving Vllaznia Shkodër.

=== Later career ===
Semina later played in the Italian lower leagues, joining OltrepòVoghera in 2018 and Pavia a year later. In December 2019, he joined fellow league club A.S.D.C. Borgomanero.

== International career ==
Semina is a former youth player of Albania national team, playing with U19 and Albania U21 side, but until now was not able to make it to the senior team.

Semina debuted with the U19 team on 18 October 2007 against Spain U19, playing the full 90 minutes in a 2–0 loss, in a match valid for the qualification of the 2008 UEFA European Under-19 Championship.
