= Artan Bushati =

Albanian football coach

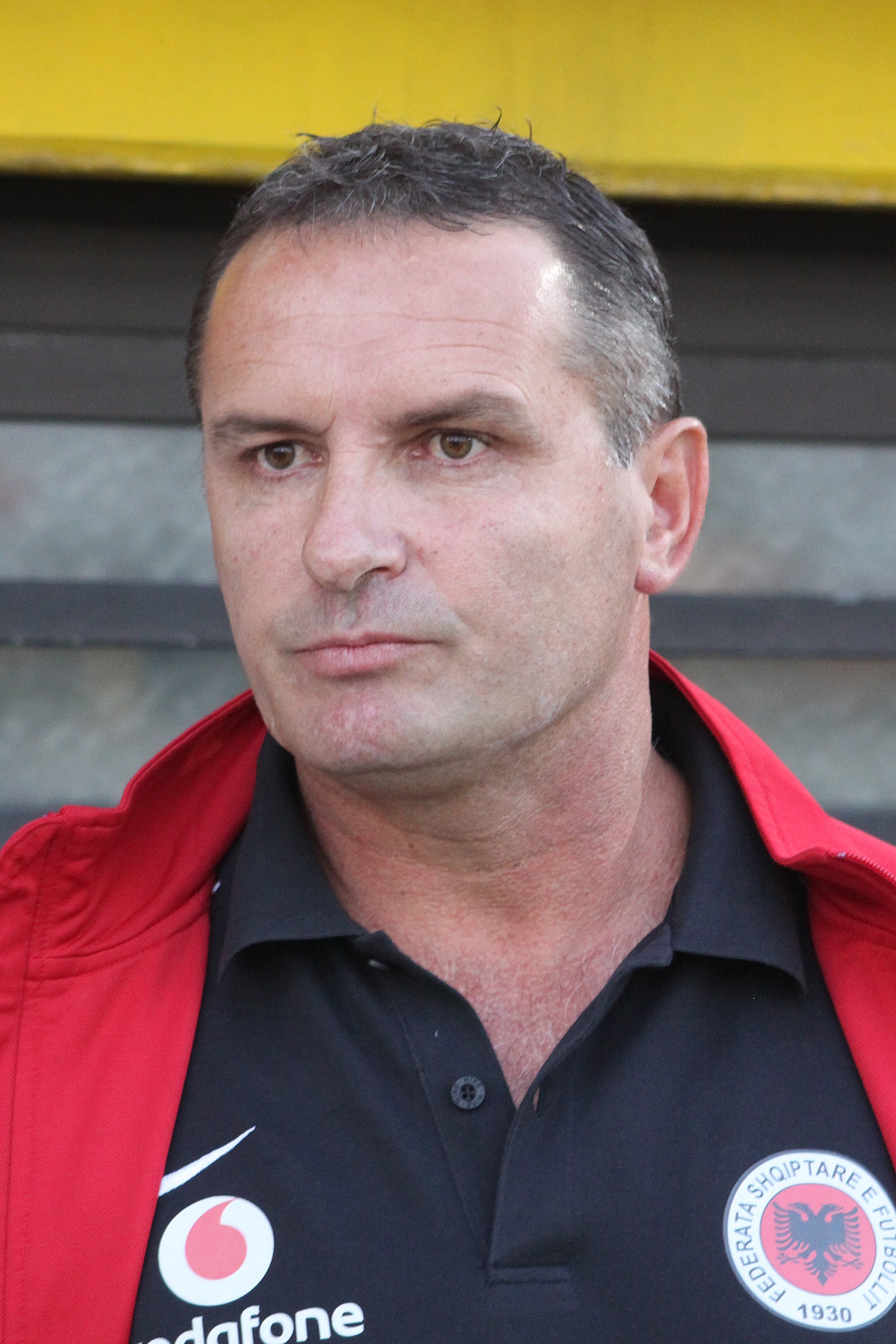

Personal information
- Full name: Artan Bushati
- Date of birth: 4 October 1963
- Place of birth: Shkodër, PR Albania
- Date of death: 29 August 2013 (aged 49)
- Place of death: Shkodër, Albania

Managerial career
- Years: Team
- 2004: Vllaznia
- 2004–2005: Elbasani
- 2005–2011: Albania U-21
- 2012–2013: Vllaznia

Artan Bushati (4 October 1963 – 29 August 2013) was an Albanian football coach who is most noted for leading the Albania U21 national team between 2005 and 2011.

== Managerial career ==
He has also managed KF Elbasani as well as his hometown club Vllaznia Shkodër shortly prior to his death.

== Political career ==
He was also active in politics and even ran for Socialist Movement for Integration in Shkodër during the 2013 parliamentary elections.

== Personal life ==
He was also a professor of physical education at the Luigj Gurakuqi University.
