= 2011–12 KF Tirana season =

Tirana
2011–12 season
- Chairman: Lulzim Basha
- Manager: Julián Rubio
- Ground: Qemal Stafa Stadium; Selman Stërmasi Stadium
- Kategoria Superiore: 3rd
- Albanian Supercup: Winners
- Albanian Cup: Winners
- Europa League: Second qualifying round
- Top goalscorer: League: Bekim Balaj (13); All: Bekim Balaj (19)
Home colours	Away colours

The 2011–12 season was Klubi i Futbollit Tirana's 73rd competitive season, 73rd consecutive season in the Kategoria Superiore and 91st year in existence as a football club. Following the title win three seasons ago, KF Tirana added to their 23 titles to make it their record 24th title win.

== Season overview ==
The 2011–12 season started well for a now-consolidated Tirana. They added another trophy, the 9th Supercup, by winning the final match against defending champions Skënderbeu Korçë in Korçë, with a single goal from Bekim Balaj.

White and Blues ended the league in the 3rd place, 5 points below crowned champions Skënderbeu Korçë, even though outstanding Spanish coach Julián Rubio had to re-create the squad twice, due to lack of players who left the club by late summer. Additionally, Tirana players and staff had to endure a temporary financial kink, caused by the latter club's transformation to sh.a. which had a negative impact in terms of the limited number of quality players which approached from the market. At majority of the season coach Rubio had severe difficulties and wasn't able to even to create a proper official squad for a match! Nonetheless, despite all difficulties faced, Tirana finally ended the season in the best possible way earning 2 trophies out of 3, by also winning their 15th Cup trophy. Tirana won the final against their fierce rivals of last 2 seasons Skënderbeu Korçë, with Bekim Balaj becoming again the key scorer, netting the winning goal at 107' at extra-time, since regular time ended goalless draw.

KF Tirana played UEFA Europa League starting from second round against FC Spartak Trnava. Being eliminated by 1–3 in aggregate, after goalless home draw and 1–3 away loss. Tirana finished first half 1–0 ahead in scoreline but conceded 3 goals at second half, saying farewell to Europe after only 2 matches.

12 October 2011 was a key event for club's future. The Municipality Council voted with unanimous consent the transformation of KF Tirana status to a shareholders association. Since then, the club is originally named as KF Tirana Sh.A (Shoqëri Aksionere). Municipality of Tirana will initially hold 100% of shares, however any future private sponsors or donors approaches to share stock would always be welcome.

== Coaching staff ==
As of November 2012

Position	Name
Head coach	Julián Rubio
Assistant coach	Sokol Bulku
Goalkeeping coach	Astrit Nallbani
Technical Director	Alban Tafaj
Club Secretary	Iva Mera
Athletic Coach	Adrian Bekteshi
Physical Therapy	Arzen Voci
OPS	Arba Morina
Reporter	Lorin Burba

== Players ==
As of 31 May 2012

Note: Flags indicate national team as defined under FIFA eligibility rules; some limited exceptions apply. Players may hold more than one non-FIFA nationality.

No.	Pos.	Nation	Player
1	GK	ALB	Ilion Lika (captain)
2	DF	ALB	Elvis Sina
3	DF	ITA	Francesco Pigoni
4	DF	ALB	Gentian Muça
4	DF	ALB	Renaldo Kalari
5	DF	ALB	Arjan Pisha
5	FW	KEN	Moses Arita
6	DF	ALB	Erjon Dushku
7	FW	ALB	Sokol Cikalleshi
8	MF	ALB	Arvis Gjata
12	MF	ALB	Julian Ahmataj
13	MF	ALB	Erando Karabeci

No.	Pos.	Nation	Player
14	MF	KEN	James Situma
17	MF	ALB	Gilman Lika
18	MF	ALB	Nertil Ferraj
19	MF	ALB	Ardit Peposhi
20	MF	GER	Florent Aziri
21	MF	ALB	Klodian Duro
22	GK	ALB	Klajdi Kuka
24	MF	ALB	Gerald Tusha
25	GK	ALB	Xhino Sejdo
26	MF	ALB	Afrim Taku
27	FW	ALB	Mario Morina

- Italics players who left the team during the season.
- Bold players who came in the team during the season.

== Competitions ==
=== Albanian Supercup ===
Win Draw Loss

18 August 2011 Final	Skënderbeu Korçë	0–1	Tirana	Korçë
20:00 CET	Bicaj (yellow card) 25'; Orelesi (red card) 82'	Report	Muça (yellow card) 22'; Balaj 63' (yellow card) 87'; Ahmataj (yellow card) 86'	Stadium: Skënderbeu Stadium; Attendance: 7,000; Referee: Enea Jorgji

=== Kategoria Superiore ===
==== League table ====
Pos	Team	Pld	W	D	L	GF	GA	GD	Pts	Qualification or relegation
1	Skënderbeu (C)	26	17	6	3	45	16	+29	57	Qualification for the Champions League second qualifying round
2	Teuta	26	17	5	4	33	18	+15	56	Qualification for the Europa League first qualifying round (Note: Tirana qualified for the Europa League first qualifying round by winning the 2011–12 Albanian Cup. Since they finished third in the league, the fourth-placed team of the league also qualified for the Europa League.)
3	Tirana	26	16	5	5	33	21	+12	53	Qualification for the Europa League first qualifying round
4	Flamurtari	26	13	7	6	42	20	+22	46	Qualification for the Europa League first qualifying round
5	Kastrioti	26	11	5	10	37	30	+7	38	

Source: Albanian Football Association (in Albanian), Soccerway
Rules for classification: 1) points; 2) points in head-to-head matches; 3) goal difference in head-to-head matches; 4) goals scored in head-to-head matches; 5) total goal difference; 6) total goals scored; 7) draw
(C) Champions

==== Results summary ====
Overall								Home						Away					
Pld	W	D	L	GF	GA	GD	Pts	W	D	L	GF	GA	GD	W	D	L	GF	GA	GD
26	16	5	5	33	21	+12	53	10	3	1	16	5	+11	6	2	4	17	16	+1

Last updated: 2 December 2015.
Source: Competitive matches

==== Results by round ====
Round	1	2	3	4	5	6	7	8	9	10	11	12	13	14	15	16	17	18	19	20	21	22	23	24	25	26
Ground	H	A	H	H	A	H	A	H	A	H	A	H	A	A	H	A	A	H	A	H	A	H	A	H	A	H
Result	L	W	W	W	D	W	W	D	W	W	L	W	D	W	W	W	W	D	L	W	L	W	L	D	W	W
Position	10	5	4	2	2	2	2	2	3	2	2	2	2	2	1	1	1	2	2	2	3	3	3	3	3	3

Source: Competitive matches
A = Away; H = Home; W = Win; D = Draw; L = Loss

==== Matches ====
12 September 2011 1	Tirana	0–1	Teuta Durrës	Tirana
17:00 CET		Report	Marković 14'	Stadium: Qemal Stafa Stadium; Attendance: 1,000; Referee: Enea Jorgji

17 September 2011 2	Kastrioti Krujë	2–3	Tirana	Krujë
15:00 CET	Inkango 40', 78'; Pashaj (yellow card) 42'; Hoxha (yellow card) 87'; Muçollari (yellow card) 90'	Report	Sina (yellow card) 40'; Balaj 47'; G. Lika 66'; Morina (yellow card) 87'; Dushku 90+2'	Stadium: Kastrioti Stadium; Attendance: 3,000; Referee: Elvis Peza

25 September 2011 3	Tirana	3–1	Pogradeci	Tirana
14:00 CET	Balaj (yellow card) 22' (goal) 52', 78'; G. Lika 41' (pen.) (yellow card) 69'	Report	Eminhaziri (yellow card) 8' (goal) 64'; Çipi (yellow card) 41'; Binishi (yellow card) 73'	Stadium: Qemal Stafa Stadium; Attendance: 800; Referee: Emirjon Sino

2 October 2011 4	Tirana	2–0	Flamurtari Vlorë	Tirana
16:00 CET	Velu 11' (o.g.); Ferraj (yellow card) 22'; Sina (yellow card) 42'; Morina 69'	Report	Sakaj (yellow card) 35'; Brkić (yellow card) 66'	Stadium: Qemal Stafa Stadium; Attendance: 3,000; Referee: Enea Jorgji

15 October 2011 5	Vllaznia Shkodër	2–2	Tirana	Shkodër
15:00 CET	Smajli (yellow card) 14'; Sukaj 51' (yellow card) 71'; Petrović 61'	Report	Ahmataj (yellow card) 28'; Sina (yellow card) 41'; Dushku (yellow card) 71'; Morina 76'; Duro 79'; Taku (yellow card) 89'	Stadium: Loro Boriçi Stadium; Attendance: 7,500; Referee: Emirjon Sino

23 October 2011 6	Tirana	3–2	Bylis Ballsh	Tirana
12:00 CET	Pisha (yellow card) 30'; Balaj 31', 52', 90+3'; Dabulla (yellow card) 35'; Taku (yellow card) 69'; I. Lika (yellow card) 74'	Report	Dimo 27', 69' (pen.); Teqja (yellow card) 47'	Stadium: Qemal Stafa Stadium; Attendance: 1,000; Referee: Sokol Çekaj

30 October 2011 7	Apolonia Fier	1–2	Tirana	Fier
12:00 CET	Gerxho 11' (yellow card) 44'; Ndoni (yellow card) 35'; Mehmetaj (yellow card) 83'; Agastra (yellow card) 89'	Report	Naçi 40' (o.g.); Sina (yellow card) 65'; Pisha 89'	Stadium: Loni Papuçiu Stadium; Attendance: 2,100; Referee: Edvin Hoxha

6 November 2011 8	Tirana	0–0	Skënderbeu Korçë	Tirana
17:00 CET	Duro (yellow card) 59'; Ferraj (yellow card) 79'; Karabeci (yellow card) 90+3'	Report	Muzaka (yellow card) 38'; Arapi (yellow card) 52'; Orelesi (yellow card) 73'; Radaš (yellow card) 81'	Stadium: Qemal Stafa Stadium; Attendance: 6,500; Referee: Lorenc Jemini

20 November 2011 9	Tomori Berat	0–1	Tirana	Lushnje
13:00 CET	Bakiu (yellow card) 70'; Muça (yellow card) 90'	Report	Dushku 33'; Balaj (yellow card) 62'	Stadium: Abdurrahman Roza Haxhiu Stadium; Referee: Laver Alla
Note: The match was held at Abdurrahman Roza Haxhiu Stadium due to reconstruction of Tomori Stadium.

26 November 2011 10	Tirana	1–0	Dinamo Tirana	Tirana
14:00 CET	G. Lika 20'; Taku (yellow card) 40'	Report	Arifaj (yellow card) 34'; Deliallisi (yellow card) 52'; Peqini (yellow card) 55'	Stadium: Qemal Stafa Stadium; Attendance: 200; Referee: Migen Masha

5 December 2011 11	Shkumbini Peqin	3–2	Tirana	Peqin
13:00 CET	Mustafaj 31'; Dervishi (yellow card) 53' (goal) 74'; Lundraxhiu (yellow card) 65'; Gjata (yellow card) 78'; Sulkja 78'	Report	Dabulla (yellow card) 40'; Balaj 53', 64'; Tusha (yellow card) 76'; Dushku (yellow card) 86'	Stadium: Shkumbini Stadium; Attendance: 1,500; Referee: Emirjon Sino

17 December 2011 12	Tirana	1–0	Laçi	Tirana
13:00 CET	Dushku (yellow card) 75'; Pisha (yellow card) 77'; Morina 80'	Report	Emurlai (yellow card) 75'	Stadium: Qemal Stafa Stadium; Attendance: 300; Referee: Laver Alla

23 December 2011 13	Kamza	0–0	Tirana	Kamëz
13:00 CET	Belchev (yellow card) 20'; Tafaj (yellow card) 87'	Report	G. Lika (yellow card) 24'; Pisha (yellow card) 53'; Elvis Sina (yellow card) 74'	Stadium: Kamza Stadium; Attendance: 1,500; Referee: Enea Jorgji

10 February 2012 14	Teuta Durrës	1–2	Tirana	Durrës
17:00 CET	Çota (yellow card) 21' (goal) 45+1'; Stafa (yellow card) 62'	Report	Balaj 12'; Morina (yellow card) 21'; Dabulla (yellow card) 53'; Stafa 55' (o.g.); Sina (yellow card) 80' (yellow-red card) 84'	Stadium: Niko Dovana Stadium; Attendance: 6,000; Referee: Enea Jorgji

4 March 2012 15	Tirana	1–0	Kastrioti Krujë	Tirana
14:00 CET	Gjata (yellow card) 26'; G. Lika 43'; Dushku (yellow card) 57'; Kalari (yellow card) 83'	Report	Inkango (yellow card) 27'; Muçollari (yellow card) 32'; Ćetković (yellow card) 70'	Stadium: Qemal Stafa Stadium; Attendance: 500; Referee: Emirjon Sino

11 March 2012 16	Pogradeci	1–2	Tirana	Elbasan
13:00 CET	Drazanin (yellow card) 3'; Eminhaziri 55' (yellow card) 64'; Çajku (yellow card) 65'; Idrizi (yellow card) 78'; Begaj (yellow card) 90+3' (yellow-red card) 90+3'	Report	Aziri 18'; Kalari (yellow card) 60'; Dushku 79'	Stadium: Ruzhdi Bizhuta Stadium; Attendance: 0 Referee: Sokol Çekaj
Note: The match was held at Ruzhdi Bizhuta Stadium due to reconstruction of Gjorgji Kyçyku Stadium. In addition the match was played behind the doors closed.

18 March 2012 17	Flamurtari Vlorë	0–2	Tirana	Vlorë
13:00 CET	Pezo (yellow card) 60'	Report	Pisha (yellow card) 13'; Morina 22' (yellow card) 51'	Stadium: Flamurtari Stadium; Attendance: 4,000; Referee: Bardhyl Pashaj

26 March 2012 18	Tirana	0–0	Vllaznia Shkodër	Tirana
17:00 CET	Karabeci (yellow card) 85'	Report	Gjini (yellow card) 34'; Petrović (yellow card) 44'; Vujadinović (yellow card) 65'	Stadium: Qemal Stafa Stadium; Attendance: 2,000; Referee: Elvis Peza

31 March 2012 19	Bylis Ballsh	1–0	Tirana	Ballsh
14:00 CET	Teqja 11' (yellow card) 40'; Bola (yellow card) 90+4'	Report	Sina (yellow card) 30'; Dushku (yellow card) 33' (yellow-red card) 71'; Morina (yellow card) 90+4'	Stadium: Adush Muça Stadium; Attendance: 2,000; Referee: Laver Alla

8 April 2012 20	Tirana	1–0	Apolonia Fier	Tirana
16:00 CET	Pisha (yellow card) 16'; Balaj 69'; Tusha (red card) 90+3'	Report	Moçka (red card) 9'; Salievski (yellow card) 61'	Stadium: Qemal Stafa Stadium; Attendance: 300; Referee: Sokol Çekaj

14 April 2012 21	Skënderbeu Korçë	2–0	Tirana	Korçë
18:00 CET	Xhafaj 51'; Allmuça 62'; Arapi (yellow card) 83'; Plaku (yellow card) 87'	Report	Morina (yellow card) 15'; Sina (yellow card) 28'; Karabeci (yellow card) 43'	Stadium: Skënderbeu Stadium; Attendance: 8,500; Referee: Enea Jorgji

22 April 2012 22	Tirana	1–0	Tomori Berat	Tirana
12:00 CET	Dushku 66'; Pisha (yellow card) 77' (yellow-red card) 82'; Balaj 90+2'	Report	Ofoyen (red card) 82'	Stadium: Qemal Stafa Stadium; Referee: Laver Alla

25 April 2012 23	Dinamo Tirana	3–2	Tirana	Tirana
15:00 CET	Djarmati 30'; Kuli 50', 90+1' (pen.)	Report	Balaj 9'; Kalari 45'; I. Lika (yellow card) 65'; Dabulla (yellow card) 90+1'	Stadium: Qemal Stafa Stadium; Attendance: 800; Referee: Bardhyl Pashaj

29 April 2012 24	Tirana	1–1	Shkumbini Peqin	Tirana
12:00 CET	Sina (yellow card) 35'; Cikalleshi 70' (yellow card) 71'	Report	Mustafaj (yellow card) 67'; Lundraxhiu (yellow card) 71'; Magani 89'	Stadium: Qemal Stafa Stadium; Attendance: 200; Referee: Kreshnik Cjapi

5 May 2012 25	Laçi	0–1	Tirana	Krujë
16:00 CET	Sefgjinaj (yellow card) 35'; Suljan (yellow card) 87'; Xhafa (yellow card) 88'	Report	Balaj 27' (yellow card) 33'; Ferraj (yellow card) 52'; Duro (yellow card) 55'; Taku (yellow card) 83'; Pisha (yellow card) 90+2'	Stadium: Kastrioti Stadium; Attendance: 0 Referee: Edvin Hoxha
Note: The match was held at Kastrioti Stadium due to reconstruction of Laçi Stadium.

12 May 2012 26	Tirana	1–0	Kamza	Tirana
16:00 CET	Cikalleshi 68'	Report		Stadium: Selman Stërmasi Stadium; Attendance: 200; Referee: Albano Janku

=== Albanian Cup ===
==== First round ====
21 September 2011 First leg	Himara	0–3	Tirana	Himarë
16:00 CET	Sako (yellow card) 40'; Sinaj (yellow card) 89'	Report	Balaj 36', 51', 65'	Stadium: Petro Ruci Stadium; Attendance: 100; Referee: Armando Kamberaj

28 September 2011 Second leg	Tirana	7–1 (10–1 agg.)	Himara	Tirana
15:30 CET	Morina 12', 23', 27', 49', 76'; Duro 57'; Ferraj 69'; Taku (yellow card) 70'	Report	Telushi (yellow card) 45'; Leonardo Martins (yellow card) 57'; Sako (yellow card) 58'; Cycllari 77'	Stadium: Selman Stërmasi Stadium; Attendance: 0 Referee: Skerdi Greca

==== Second round ====
Pos	Team	Pld	W	D	L	GF	GA	GD	Pts	Qualification
1	Tirana	6	6	0	0	13	4	+9	18	Advance to quarter-finals
2	Laçi	6	2	2	2	7	5	+2	8	Advance to quarter-finals
3	Apolonia	6	2	1	3	11	13	−2	7	
4	Shkumbini	6	0	1	5	10	19	−9	1	

Rules for classification: 1) points; 2) goal difference; 3) number of goals scored.

19 October 2011 1	Tirana	3–1	Shkumbini Peqin	Tirana
14:00 CET	Duro 27' (pen.); Balaj 29'; Hepple 79'	Report	Magani 53'	Stadium: Selman Stërmasi Stadium; Attendance: 500; Referee: Laver Alla

26 October 2011 2	Laçi	0–1	Tirana	Laç
14:00 CET		Report	Balaj 90+2'	Stadium: Laçi Stadium; Attendance: 700; Referee: Laver Alla

23 November 2011 3	Tirana	3–0	Apolonia Fier	Tirana
14:00 CET	Ferraj 23'; Hepple 38'; Ndoni 81' (o.g.)	Report		Stadium: Qemal Stafa Stadium; Attendance: 500; Referee: Ditmar Jubica

30 November 2011 4	Apolonia Fier	1–2	Tirana	Fier
14:00 CET	Ribaj 55'	Report	Balaj 39'; G. Lika 80'	Stadium: Loni Papuçiu Stadium; Attendance: 400; Referee: Hermal Llapra

14 December 2011 5	Shkumbini Peqin	2–3	Tirana	Peqin
13:00 CET	Sulkja 54'; Lluca 90+2'	Report	Ferraj 9', 16'; Tusha 55'	Stadium: Shkumbini Stadium; Attendance: 300; Referee: Kreshnik Cjapi

20 December 2011 6	Tirana	1–0	Laçi	Tirana
13:00 CET	Morina 32'	Report		Stadium: Selman Stërmasi Stadium; Attendance: 100; Referee: Andi Koçi

==== Quarter-finals ====
Pos	Team	Pld	W	D	L	GF	GA	GD	Pts	Qualification
1	Tirana	6	3	2	1	8	4	+4	11	Advance to semi-finals
2	Kastrioti	6	3	1	2	9	9	0	10	Advance to semi-finals
3	Bylis	6	2	3	1	11	7	+4	9	
4	Kamza	6	0	2	4	3	11	−8	2	

Rules for classification: 1) points; 2) goal difference; 3) number of goals scored.

29 January 2012 1	Bylis Ballsh	0–0	Tirana	Ballsh
13:00 CET		Report		Stadium: Adush Muça Stadium; Attendance: 1,200; Referee: Remzi Sadiku

4 February 2012 2	Tirana	2–0	Kastrioti Krujë	Tirana
14:00 CET	G. Lika 74'; Aziri 81'	Report		Stadium: Qemal Stafa Stadium; Attendance: 600; Referee: Lorenc Jemini

23 February 2012 3	Kamza	1–2	Tirana	Kamëz
14:00 CET	Manuka 10'	Report	G. Lika 80'; Morina 90+1'	Stadium: Kamëz Stadium; Attendance: 1,000; Referee: Edvin Hoxha

7 March 2012 4	Tirana	2–0	Kamza	Tirana
14:00 CET	Balaj 55'; Cikalleshi 84'	Report		Stadium: Qemal Stafa Stadium; Attendance: 500; Referee: Remzi Sadiku

14 March 2012 5	Tirana	1–1	Bylis Ballsh	Tirana
14:00 CET	Aziri 51'	Report	Abazaj 30'	Stadium: Qemal Stafa Stadium; Attendance: 500; Referee: Remzi Sadiku

21 March 2012 6	Kastrioti Krujë	2–1	Tirana	Krujë
15:00 CET	Sefa 65'; Inkango 83'	Report	Ferraj 90+3'	Stadium: Kastrioti Stadium; Attendance: 1,000; Referee: Hermal Llapra

==== Semi-finals ====
4 April 2012 First leg	Flamurtari Vlorë	0–3	Tirana	Vlorë
16:00 CET	Veliu (yellow card) 54'; Alechenwu (yellow card) 58'; Çela (yellow card) 69'; Telushi (yellow card) 90+1'	Report	Dushku 4'; Ferraj (yellow card) 60'; Cikalleshi 69'; Tusha 90+3'	Stadium: Flamurtari Stadium; Attendance: 1,500; Referee: Enea Jorgji

18 April 2012 Second leg	Tirana	2–2 (5–2 agg.)	Flamurtari Vlorë	Tirana
15:30 CET	Cikalleshi 6'; Ferraj 29'; Duro (yellow card) 72'	Report	Pejić 21'; Pezo 78'	Stadium: Qemal Stafa Stadium; Attendance: 0 Referee: Albano Janku

==== Final ====
17 May 2012 Final	Skënderbeu Korçë	0−1 (a.e.t.)	Tirana	Tirana
20:00 CET	Radaš (yellow card) 35'; Arapi (yellow card) 43'; Shkëmbi (yellow card) 90+2'; Allmuça (yellow card) 102'; Kërçiku (yellow card) 103'	Report	Pisha (yellow card) 13'; Ahmataj (yellow card) 60'; Tusha (yellow card) 98'; Balaj 107'; Kalari (yellow card) 111'; I. Lika (yellow card) 115'	Stadium: Qemal Stafa Stadium; Attendance: 5,000; Referee: Lorenc Jemini

=== UEFA Europa League ===
==== Second qualifying round ====
14 July 2011 First leg	Tirana (Albania)	0–0	(Slovakia) Spartak Trnava	Tirana, Albania
20:00 CET	Taku (yellow card) 31'; Kërçiku (yellow card) 57'	Report	Gogolák (yellow card) 73'; Vyskočil (yellow card) 89'	Stadium: Qemal Stafa Stadium; Attendance: 4,000; Referee: Vladimir Kazmenko (Russia)

21 July 2011 Second leg	Spartak Trnava (Slovakia)	3–1 (3–1 agg.)	(Albania) Tirana	Trnava, Slovakia
19:00 CET	Tomaček (yellow card) 18' (goal) 41', 85' (pen.); Vyskočil (yellow card) 56'; Procházka 66'; Petráš (yellow card) 70'	Report	Karabeci (yellow card) 3' (yellow-red card) 90+2'; G. Lika 22'; Kalari (yellow card) 45+1'; Pashaj (yellow card) 64'	Stadium: Štadión Antona Malatinského; Attendance: 6,182; Referee: Dawid Piasecki (Poland)
