= Renaldo Kalari =

Albanian footballer

Personal information
- Date of birth: 25 June 1984 (age 42)
- Place of birth: Tirana, PSR Albania
- Height: 1.79 m (5 ft 10 in)
- Position: Defender

Youth career
- 2000–2003: Tirana

Senior career*
Years	Team	Apps	(Gls)
2003–2005	Tirana	10	(0)
2005–2006	Shkumbini	22	(0)
2006–2008	Kastrioti	35	(4)
2008	Partizani	13	(0)
2009–2011	Kastrioti	52	(4)
2011–2015	Tirana	59	(1)
2012–2013	→ Kastrioti (loan)	11	(2)
2015–2019	Partizani	80	(1)

International career
2000–2001	Albania U16	1	(0)
- * Club domestic league appearances and goals

Renaldo Kalari (born 25 June 1984) is an Albanian former professional footballer who played as a defender.

== Club career ==
Kalari is a product of the KF Tirana academy and joined the senior team in 2004 but found it very difficult to break through into the squad, this subsequently lead to Kalari being loan out to Shkumbini Peqin for the 2005–06 campaign. His return to Tirana did not last as he signed for Kastrioti Krujë in 2006, where he would stay for the next two seasons until the club was relegated to the Albanian First Division.

He returned to the capital in the summer of 2008 with Partizani Tirana but only played for the first half of the 2008–09 season, as the club was in turmoil. He left Partizani joined Kastrioti once again in January 2009, helping the club win promotion to the Albanian Superliga. He became one of the club's main players in the next few season, which was noted by the player's former club KF Tirana, who gave him the chance to return once again to his hometown. In February 2013, he was sent on loan to Kastrioti Krujë until the end of 2012–13 season.

During the summer transfer window 2015, Kalari left Tirana and signed with their cross-town rivals Partizani Tirana, taking the vacant squad number 99 for the upcoming 2015–16 season. On 30 September 2016, during the league match against the rivals Skënderbeu Korçë, which finished in a goalless draw, Kalari received a controversial 61st minute red card after a tackle on Liridon Latifi. Later on 27 May, he scored his first Partizani goal in the final matchday of 2016–17 season against the same opponent, netting a free-kick in an eventual 2–2 draw, which was enough for the team to clinch the second position.

On 18 June 2017, Kalari agreed a contract extension, signing until June 2018.

== International career ==
Kalari made his first and only appearance for Albania U16 on 8 October 2000 in the match against Georgia which finished in a 1–0 away defeat.

== Career statistics ==
As of 31 October 2016

Appearances and goals by club, season and competition
Club	Season	League			Cup		Europe		Other		Total	
Club	Season	Division	Apps	Goals	Apps	Goals	Apps	Goals	Apps	Goals	Apps	Goals
Kastrioti Krujë	2006–07	Albanian Superliga	13	1	0	0	—		—		13	1
Kastrioti Krujë	2007–08	Albanian Superliga	22	3	0	0	—		—		22	3
Kastrioti Krujë	Total		35	4	0	0	—		—		35	4
Partizani Tirana	2008–09	Albanian Superliga	13	0	2	0	—		—		15	0
Kastrioti Krujë	2008–09	Albanian First Division	0	0	1	0	—		—		1	0
Kastrioti Krujë	2009–10	Albanian Superliga	29	3	1	0	—		—		30	3
Kastrioti Krujë	2010–11	Albanian Superliga	23	1	0	0	—		—		23	1
Kastrioti Krujë	Total		52	4	2	0	—		—		54	4
Tirana	2011–12	Albanian Superliga	17	1	14	0	2 (Note: Appearance(s) in UEFA Europa League)	0	1 (Note: Appearance in Albanian Supercup)	0	34	1
Tirana	2012–13	Albanian Superliga	2	0	2	0	2	0	1	0	7	0
Tirana	2013–14	Albanian Superliga	17	0	3	0	—		—		20	0
Tirana	2014–15	Albanian Superliga	23	0	5	0	—		—		28	0
Tirana	Total		59	1	24	0	4	0	2	0	89	1
Kastrioti Krujë (loan)	2012–13	Albanian Superliga	11	2	2	0	—		—		13	2
Partizani Tirana	2015–16	Albanian Superliga	24	0	3	0	2	0	—		29	0
Partizani Tirana	2016–17	Albanian Superliga	4	0	2	0	4 (Note: One appearance in UEFA Europa League, three appearances in UEFA Champions League)	0	—		10	0
Partizani Tirana	Total		28	0	5	0	6	0	—		39	0
Career total			198	11	35	0	10	0	2	0	245	11

== Honours ==
Tirana

- Albanian Cup: 2011–12
- Albanian Supercup: 2011, 2012
