= Gilman Lika =

Albanian footballer

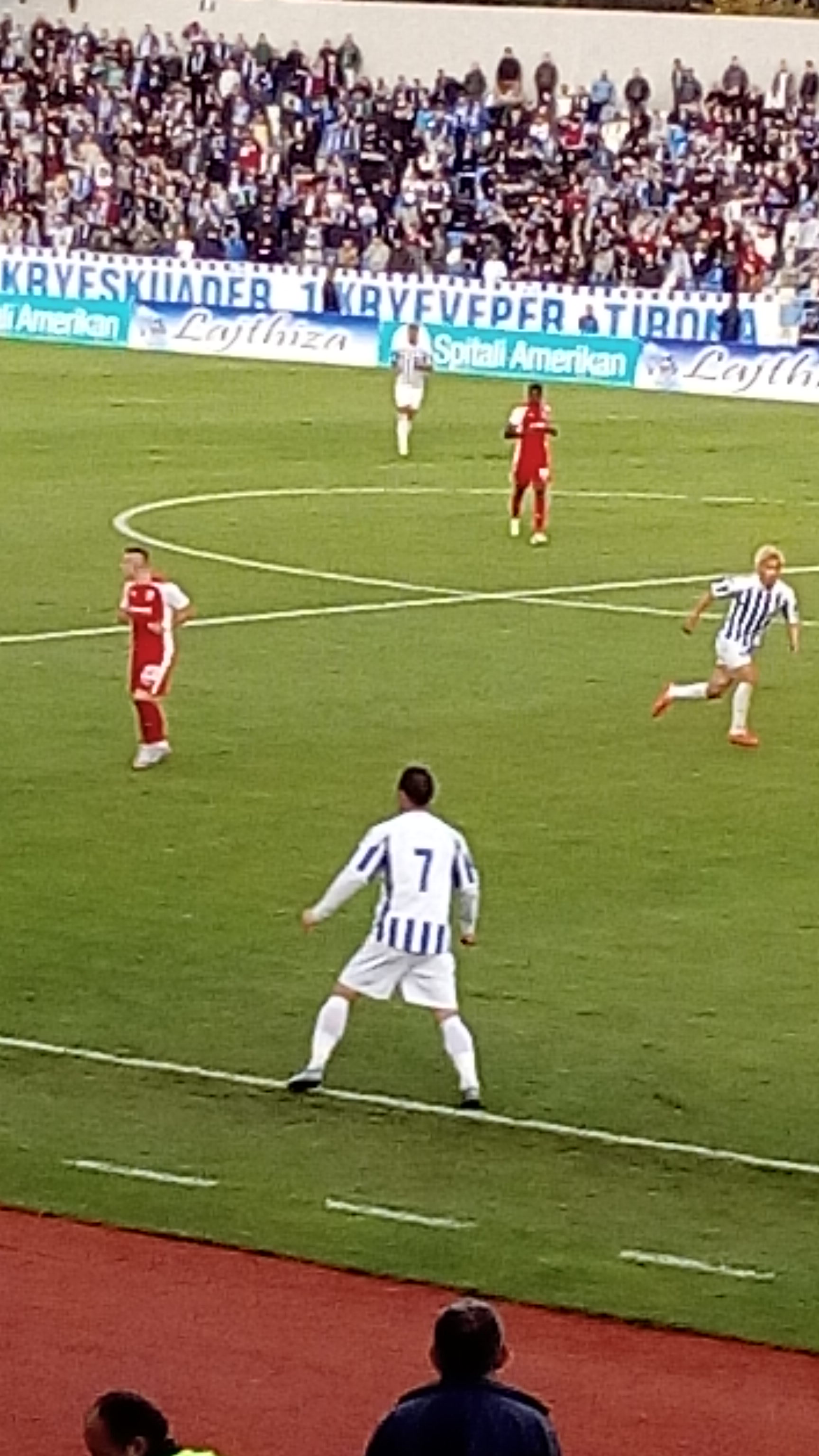
- Gilman Lika (#7) with Tirana

Personal information
- Date of birth: 13 January 1987 (age 39)
- Place of birth: Shkodër, Albania
- Height: 1.79 m (5 ft 10 in)
- Position: Midfielder

Youth career
- 2001–2004: Vllaznia Shkodër

Senior career*
Years	Team	Apps	(Gls)
2004–2008	Vllaznia	79	(6)
2008–2009	Hacettepe	24	(2)
2009–2010	Boluspor	28	(3)
2010–2011	Diyarbakırspor	4	(0)
2011–2013	Tirana	61	(14)
2013–2014	Al-Faisaly	12	(3)
2014–2015	Flamurtari	29	(2)
2015	Vllaznia	17	(3)
2015–2017	Tirana	54	(2)
2017–2020	Vllaznia	90	(15)

International career
2004–2005	Albania U19	3	(1)
2005–2008	Albania U21	9	(1)
2008–2013	Albania	19	(0)
- * Club domestic league appearances and goals

Gilman Lika (born 31 January 1987) is an Albanian former professional footballer who played as a midfielder.

Having started his career with Vllaznia Shkodër in 2004, he moved to Turkey in 2008, where he played for Hacettepe, Boluspor and Diyarbakırspor before returning to Albania to play for Tirana. He then had a brief stint in Saudi Arabia with Al-Faisaly before returning to Albania once again to play for Flamurtari Vlorë and Vllaznia Shkodër, before returning to Tirana in July 2015.

A full international for Albania from 2008 to 2013, Lika earned 19 caps for his country. He has also represented the Albania U-19 and U-21 sides.

== Club career ==
=== Early career ===
Born in Shkodër, Lika started his playing career with Vllaznia Shkodër. After years working up the ranks at the club, Lika finally made his breakthrough during the 2005–06 season at the age of just 18. He made his debut in the Albanian Superliga against Lushnja on 18 September 2005 in a 1–3 win; he came on as a substitute on the 89th minute. During that season, Lika managed to play 28 games. His first goal came against Dinamo Tirana on 29 April 2006. Lika came on as a substitute in the 46th minute and his goal came in the 86th minute. During his years at Vllaznia Shkodër, Lika produced many great performances, and in total he played 77 games and scored 14 goals in the Albanian Superliga.

=== Turkey ===
Along with fellow Vllaznia Shkodër players Admir Teli and Xhevahir Sukaj, he moved to the Turkish side Hacettepe Spor Kulübü on 4 August 2008. After joining the club, Lika managed to make it into the starting lineup. During his time at Hacettepe, Lika played 24 matches and scored two goals, being one of the valuable players of the team, which finished the 2008–09 season in the last position.

After leaving Hacettepe Spor Kulübü, Lika signed with fellow Turkish side Boluspor in August 2009. He scored two goals in his debut match against Mersin İdmanyurdu on 23 August, helping the team to win match 2–1. This was followed by another goal in the 2–1 away defeat to Çaykur Rizespor, which made temporarily him the TFF First League top goalscorer.

After a year at Boluspor, Lika was transferred to Diyarbakırspor.

=== Tirana ===
Lika returned to Albania in January 2011 following a two and a half year absence, signing a two-year contract with Tirana. His made his deput for Tirana debut on 31 January 2011 in the Tirana derby against Dinamo Tirana, helping his team secure side to a 2–1 victory.

On 7 November 2012, in the returning leg of 2012–13 Albanian Cup's second round against Kukësi, Lika produced a Man of the Match performance by providing two assists and scoring a goal in an eventual 3–2 home win, which was not enough as Tirana was eliminated with the aggregate 6–3, losing the first leg 4–0. However, after the match it was reported that Lika suffered an ankle injury in his left leg.

On 7 April 2013, Lika scored an amazing free kick against Skënderbeu Korçë, which proved to be the winner as Tirana won the match 1–0 at Qemal Stafa Stadium.

=== Flamurtari Vlorë ===
On 1 February 2014, Lika completed a transfer to Flamurtari Vlorë as a free agent by signing a four-month contract worth €50,000. He made his competitive debut a day later in the goalless draw against Bylis Ballsh, playing the entire second half. His first score-sheet contributions came in his fourth appearance for the club on 22 February, starting and scoring an opener in an eventual 2–3 away defeat at Kukësi. During the match, he was involved in an incident with the home crowd, provoking them after scoring the first goal of the match. Lika defended himself by saying: "I understand that I might have exaggerated, but everything has a reason. I want to tell with the biggest sincerity that during the match, Kukësi fans insulted me with the lowest insults ever. That's why I reacted like this after I scored the goal." He scored his second goal of the season one month later, exactly against the same opponent, in another away defeat, this time 4–2, as Lika scored the match's last goal. Lika finished the second part of the season by making 16 league appearances, scoring twice in the process, as Flamurtari finished the season in the 7th position. He was also an important instrument in team's success in cup, making 5 appearances, including a full-90 minute in the final, as the team defeated Kukësi at Qemal Stafa Stadium to save the season, securing a spot in 2014–15 UEFA Europa League first qualifying round.

In June 2014, it was confirmed that Lika would stay at the club for the upcoming season. He was included in the Europa League squad, and played his first match of the season on 3 July in the away tie against Sioni Bolnisi, scoring the winner in the last minute of added time to reward his team with a 3–2 win. He also played in the returning leg as Flamurtari went through thanks to away goal rule. On 5 January 2015, Lika terminated his contract with the club after 11 months, becoming a free agent in the process.

=== Vllaznia Shkodër ===
On 23 January 2015, Lika agreed terms with his first club Vllaznia Shkodër to return to his hometown club following a six-year absence, signing a six-month contract. He made his debut one week later, starting and playing the full 90 minutes in a 2–1 upset against Teuta Durrës at Niko Dovana Stadium. On 8 February, Lika played for the first time in Loro Boriçi Stadium as an Vllaznia player after six years absence, starting again and playing 90 minutes in another defeat, this time against his former employer Tirana. Lika scored his first goal for Vllaznia after his return, and also his first goal of 2014–15 season, in a 2–0 home win over Apolonia Fier.

During February he made his Albanian Cup debut as well, playing 90 minutes in a two-legged match against FK Kukësi, who advanced to the next round with the aggregate 2–0. On 18 April, during the league match against his former team Flamurtari Vlorë, Lika scored a free-kick in the 59th minute to help the team to leave the stadium with one point. He scored his third goal of the season again by free-kick, this time in a 1–1 draw against Elbasani at the neutral ground Gjorgji Kyçyku Stadium.

Vllaznia ended the season in seventh place with 35 points, running out of objectives. In individual aspect, Lika ended the second part of the season with Vllaznia by playing 19 matches in all competitions, including 17 in Albanian Superliga, and scored two goals. His good performances attracted the attention of capital clubs, Tirana and Partizani. Lika left the club on 1 July after his contract expired, being a free agent. During an interview, Lika said that he left Vllaznia because of "difficult situation of the club", adding that "every player in his place would do the same thing".

=== Return to Tirana ===
On 6 July 2015, Lika returned to Tirana after three seasons absence, signing a one-year contract. Before the transfer, the media's started to speculating that Lika will not move to Tirana if the capital club will not pay more than half of the €30,000 debt that the club had not paid during the last time that Lika was part of Tirana. During his presentation in Thursday, Lika said that "Tirana is his second home after Shkodra", by adding that "with this return, he felt like he's returning home".

He made his return debut in the season away opener, scoring in a 2–1 win over newly promoted side Tërbuni Pukë. He scored his second of the season against the same opponents later on 7 November, giving the team its second consecutive league win. Lika finished his return season by making 33 league appearances, in addition 5 cup matches, scoring 3 times, including 1 in cup, as Tirana finished the season in the 5th position, remaining out of European competitions for the fourth consecutive year, collecting 53 points, 18 less the last season.

On 17 July 2016, he was included in team's summer training camp in Zlatibor, Slovenia, but was forced to return early in Albania due to an injury. On 24 May of the following year, Lika requested not to play in the final matchday against his boyhood club Vllaznia, stating that he was not going to put Vllaznia in danger, who risked relegation along with Tirana. He became the third player to do so after Elis Bakaj and Endrit Vrapi, who both refused to play against Tirana. His request was accepted by club president Refik Halili. Tirana didn't go more than a goalless draw and was eventually relegated to Albanian First Division for the first time in history, leaving Vllaznia as the only club never to be relegated.

On 31 May, in the Albanian Cup final against Skënderbeu Korçë, Lika played the whole match as Tirana won 3–1 in extra time after the regular time ended in a 1–1, winning the 16th Albanian Cup in history, 5th in Lika's career, becoming the most successful club. Following the end of season, Lika's contract ended, and he decided not to extend it.

=== Second Vllaznia Shkodër return ===
On 3 August 2017, Lika reached an agreement with Vllaznia, signing a 1+1 contract, returning in Shkodër for a second time. He was presented one day later, and was handed squad number 19. He was named new captain following the departure of Ndriçim Shtubina and made his third debut on 17 September in the 0–1 home loss to Teuta Durrës. He opened his scoring account on 22 November by netting the opener against the bottom side Lushnja in an eventual 2–1 home win, the first after 9 matches. Lika was on the score-sheet four days later as he netted a late winner against the other relegation strugglers Luftëtari Gjirokastër to give his side another three points and the second consecutive league win.

== International career ==
Lika had played for Albania under-21 since making his debut on 11 October 2005 in a match against Turkey. The match ended in a draw, and although Lika started on his debut, he was subbed off in the 55th minute. He has nine appearances for the under-21 side from 2005 to 2008. Lika has also played for Albania U-19, although he only played 4 games during 23 October 2005 and 27 October 2005.

Lika made his senior international debut in a friendly against Azerbaijan on 19 November 2008 following a call-up by Arie Haan. He was a 73rd-minute substitute for Klodian Duro in the 1–1 draw. His first competitive cap came just a few months later against Malta where he started the game on the left of the five man midfield and helped his side to a goal less draw.

== Career statistics ==
=== Club ===
As of 2 November 2016

Club statistics
Club	Season	League			Cup		Continental		Other		Total	
Club	Season	Division	Apps	Goals	Apps	Goals	Apps	Goals	Apps	Goals	Apps	Goals
Vllaznia Shkodër	2004–05	Albanian Superliga	3	0	0	0	—		—		3	0
Vllaznia Shkodër	2005–06	Albanian Superliga	28	1	0	0	—		—		28	1
Vllaznia Shkodër	2006–07	Albanian Superliga	32	2	0	0	—		—		32	2
Vllaznia Shkodër	2007–08	Albanian Superliga	39	3	1	1	—		—		30	4
Vllaznia Shkodër	2008–09	Albanian Superliga	0	0	0	0	3 (Note: All appearance(s) in UEFA Europa League)	0	1 (Note: Appearance in Albanian Supercup)	0	30	4
Vllaznia Shkodër	Total		102	6	1	1	3	0	1	0	107	7
Hacettepe	2008–09	Süper Lig	24	2	1	0	—		—		25	2
Boluspor	2009–10	TFF First League	28	3	1	0	—		—		29	3
Diyarbakırspor	2010–11	TFF First League	4	0	0	0	—		—		4	0
Tirana	2010–11	Albanian Superliga	13	1	4	0	—		—		17	1
Tirana	2011–12	Albanian Superliga	22	4	0	0	2	1	1	0	25	5
Tirana	2012–13	Albanian Superliga	26	9	3	2	4	0	1	0	34	11
Tirana	Total		61	14	7	2	6	0	2	0	107	7
Skënderbeu Korçë	2013–14	Albanian Superliga	—		—		2 (Note: All appearance(s) in UEFA Champions League)	0	0	0	2	0
Al-Faisaly	2013–14	Saudi Professional League	12	1	1	0	—		—		13	1
Flamurtari Vlorë	2013–14	Albanian Superliga	16	2	5	0	—		—		21	2
Flamurtari Vlorë	2014–15	Albanian Superliga	13	0	0	0	4	1	1	0	18	1
Flamurtari Vlorë	Total		29	2	5	0	4	1	1	0	39	3
Vllaznia Shkodër	2014–15	Albanian Superliga	17	3	2	0	—		—		19	3
Tirana	2015–16	Albanian Superliga	33	2	5	1	—		—		38	3
Tirana	2016–17	Albanian Superliga	1	0	2	1	—		—		3	1
Tirana	Total		34	2	7	2	—		—		41	4
Career total			318	36	25	4	15	2	4	0	262	42

=== International ===
As of 21 October 2014

Albania national team
Year	Apps	Goals
2008	1	0
2009	7	0
2010	5	0
2011	4	0
2012	1	0
2013	1	0
2014	0	0
Total	19	0

== Honours ==
=== Club ===
Vllaznia Shkodër

- Albanian Cup: 2007–08

Tirana

- Albanian Cup: 2010–11, 2011–12, 2016–17
- Albanian Supercup: 2011, 2012

Flamurtari Vlorë

- Albanian Cup: 2013–14

=== Individual ===
Albanian Superliga Player of the Month: September 2011
