= Bekim Balaj =

Albanian footballer (born 1991)

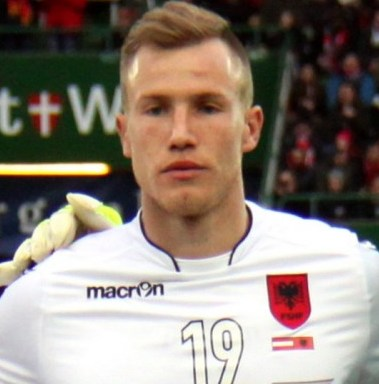
- Balaj with Albania in 2016

Personal information
- Date of birth: 11 January 1991 (age 35)
- Place of birth: Shkodër, PSR Albania
- Height: 1.88 m (6 ft 2 in)
- Position: Forward

Team information
- Current team: Vllaznia Shkodër
- Number: 9

Youth career
- 2002–2009: Vllaznia Shkodër

Senior career*
Years	Team	Apps	(Gls)
2009–2010	Vllaznia Shkodër	38	(9)
2010–2011	Gençlerbirliği	1	(0)
2011–2012	Tirana	37	(15)
2012–2014	Sparta Prague	12	(3)
2013–2014	→ Jagiellonia Białystok (loan)	31	(7)
2014–2015	Slavia Prague	13	(3)
2015–2016	Rijeka	46	(18)
2016–2019	Akhmat Grozny	61	(12)
2019–2021	Sturm Graz	57	(9)
2021	Nizhny Novgorod	15	(0)
2022	Boluspor	14	(4)
2022–2023	Ankara Keçiörengücü	14	(1)
2023–	Vllaznia Shkodër	131	(56)

International career^{‡}
2008–2010	Albania U19	6	(3)
2010–2012	Albania U21	8	(3)
2012–2022	Albania	48	(9)
- * Club domestic league appearances and goals as of 24 June 2026 ‡ National team caps and goals as of 26 October 2022

Bekim Balaj (born 11 January 1991) is an Albanian professional footballer who plays as a forward for Albanian club Vllaznia Shkodër.

Balaj started his football career with his hometown club Vllaznia and made his professional debut at the age of 17 before going on to score 17 goals in 38 games for the club before moving to Turkey to join Gençlerbirliği. After little success in Turkey he returned to Albania and played for Tirana where he scored 15 league goals in 37 games before joining Sparta Prague in the Czech Republic in January 2013.

During his time at Sparta Prague he was loaned out to Polish side Jagiellonia Białystok for the entire 2013–14 campaign where he scored 9 goals in 36 games in all competition before return to his parent club for the first half of the following season. He joined Croatian club HNK Rijeka in January 2015 for a fee of €600,000.

Balaj begun his international career with under-19 squad in 2008, and two years later also represented the under-21 squad. He made his international senior debut in 2012 and played an important role in Albania's successful UEFA Euro 2016 qualifying campaign, notably scoring the winner with a volley in the opening day against Portugal. He was selected in the 23-man squad for UEFA Euro 2016, making his debut against Romania in the final group match.

== Club career ==
=== Vllaznia ===
Balaj joined his hometown club Vllaznia as an 11-year-old in 2002, and his father had told the youth team coach Astrit Premçi to initially test the player as a goalkeeper as he was tall for his age. However, after only a few training sessions with Balaj, the coach Premçi realised the player was an able outfield player as he was good with his feet, so he then played him as a centre forward.

He was invited to train with the first team by the coach Mirel Josa during the latter stages of the 2007–08 season, and he made his first team debut on 17 May 2008 at the age of 17 years, 4 months and 6 days in an away game against Besëlidhja, coming on as a 70th-minute substitute for Albert Kaçi in the 4–2 loss. He became a first team regular the following season, and he scored his first senior goal on his first appearances of the campaign in an Albanian Cup tie against Sopoti, before going on to make 12 appearances in all competition, 7 of which were in the league and 10 of which were substitute appearances. He was part of the Vllaznia team that finished runners-up in the Kategoria Superiore, finishing 4 points behind the eventual winners Tirana.

With the departures of Xhevahir Sukaj and James Boadu ahead of the 2009–10 season, Balaj became the club's main striker alongside Vioresin Sinani. He made his European debut on 2 July 2009 against Irish club Sligo Rovers, coming on as an 85th-minute substitute for Vioresin Sinani in the 2–1 away win.

In April 2010 he went on trial with PSG alongside fellow Albanian youth international Odise Roshi, but neither players' trial was successful. In June, he went on another trial, this time in Turkey with Gençlerbirliği and he was immediately offered a contract to join the club.

=== Gençlerbirliği ===
A top Turkish club had been tracking the young forward for most of the 2009–2010 season whilst he was at Vllaznia; the club was not identified in January 2010 as they did not make a bid, however following the huge interest shown by Gençlerbirliği S.K. in May and June, it became clear who the unnamed Turkish club was. Balaj signed a four-year contract with Gençlerbirliği on 17 June 2010. The transfer fee was reported to be around €200,000 to €300,000, which was all given to his previous club Vllaznia in Albania. Balaj's manager Dritan Gjyrezi had only been a licensed FIFA agent for a year before managing this deal; this was his first deal in his career as an agent and he hoped to be able to send more Albanian players to Turkey. Balaj signed the contract earning him €150,000 for the first year, making the deal to be worth around €600,000 for the full four years.

=== KF Tirana ===
In January Balaj received offers from both Tirana and his former club Vllaznia for a return to Albania. But after meeting with Refik Halili he signed a two-year contract for Tirana on 20 January 2011, earning €70,000 a season, which was a higher offer than Vllaznia's €50,000.

He made his debut for his new club on 3 February in a home match against Skënderbeu which ended in 0–0 draw, with Balaj coming on at the start of the second half for Gilman Lika. His first Tirana goal came in the Albanian Cup semi final second leg against Besa on 6 April, scoring the equalising goal to secure his side's place in the final. He then went on to score his first league goal just nine days later in a 6–1 thrashing of Elbasani. Despite good performances since his January move, new coach Mišo Krstičević did not pick him to start in the final of the Albanian Cup. Balaj came on for Gilman Lika in the 54th minute and helped his side win the trophy despite ending the game with ten men and Balaj himself missing a penalty in the shootout which ended 4–3 after heroics from the keeper Ilion Lika.

He scored the winning goal in the 2011 Albanian Supercup against the league winners Skënderbeu, in a match delayed and disrupted by crowd trouble.

His first league goal of the season came on 17 September in the second week of the campaign, away at Kastrioti. Starting the game as a lone striker, he equalised for Tirana in the 48th minute and helped his side win the game 3–2, earning their first three points of the campaign. Following Tirana's first win in the league, it had become evident that Balaj and Gilman Lika had formed an effective partnership from midfield to attack, both of whom are from Shkodër. His next goal came just four days later in the first round of the Albanian Cup against Himara of the Kategoria e Parë. He scored in the 36th minute, a penalty in the 52nd minute and finally rounded off his hattrick in the 67th minute, before Julián Rubio being forced to replace the player following a strong challenge which left him with an ankle injury. After scoring four goals in as many days he hoped he could one day force his way into the Albania national team, which he said would be a dream following a good start to the season.

=== Sparta Prague ===
Balaj joined Sparta Prague on trial in July 2012 in order for the manager Vítězslav Lavička to get a closer look at the player before the deal to join the club was finalised. Lavička started with Balaj in a friendly against Vlašim on 17 July. Balaj started the game brightly, getting close to scoring with a header in the 5th minute, and eventually scoring in the 19th minute with a powerful shot on goal from just outside the 18-yard box to put Sparta Prague 3–0 up. He was substituted at half time and the game was won by Sparta Prague 5–0. After the friendly he returned to Albania to sort out his contract with KF Tirana, who did not want him to leave unless they received a fee of €100,000, with Sparta Prague only offering half that sum because Bala's deal with KF Tirana was due to expire in January 2013.

On 4 October 2012, Balaj scored an historical goal in his career at UEFA Europa League against Athletic Bilbao, a match valid for group stage finished in the victory 3–1.

==== Loan to Jagiellonia ====
On 8 July 2013 he moved on loan for a year to Polish side Jagiellonia Białystok in the Ekstraklasa. He scored his 3rd goal on 9 August 2013 against Wisła Kraków in the 90'+3 to give his team the 1–1 draw. Balaj scored twice against Ruch Chorzów on 15 September 2013 and Jagiellonia won 6–0 with Balaj scoring two last goals to send in 5 number of goals scored in the season. Balaj scored his 5th goal on 4 November 2013 against Piast Gliwice to open the score in the 56th minute but it wasn't enough as Jagiellonia got overturned 2–1.

==== Return to Slavia Prague ====
After being returned to Sparta Prague from Jagiellonia where he was loaned for a year, he signed for the city's rivals SK Slavia Prague on 10 July 2014. He made it his debut on 26 July 2014 in the opening 2014–15 season's match against Slovácko, also his debut brought his first goal as well, as he scored the victory goal 1–2, where the match result came from behind 1–0 of the first half. On 11 August 2014 Balaj scored the opening goal in the 17th minute of the match victory 4–1 against Slovan Liberec. On 1 November 2014 Balaj came in as a substitute in the 84th minute and scored in the 87' the goal of advantage to bring his team the 3–2 victory against Příbram.

=== HNK Rijeka ===
On 7 January 2015 Balaj signed a 2 1/2-year contract (with a 2-year extension option) with HNK Rijeka, the runners-up in the Croatian First Football League.

On 11 February 2015 Balaj made his competitive début in Rijeka's 4–1 win against NK Lokomotiva in the first leg of the Croatian Cup quarter-final, also scoring his first goal for the club. Balaj made his league début also scoring a goal. He also scored in the Adriatic derby between Rijeka and Hajduk Split on 18 February 2015, which Rijeka won 3–0. Balaj scored his second goal in the second league game in a row and third including both championships against RNK Split in the 56th minute of the match, to give his team the 1–1 draw. During the season, Balaj scored 9 goals in 15 appearances, helping Rijeka to finished as runners-up and secure a place in the 2015–16 UEFA Europa League - Second qualifying round. Balaj also features in three 2014–15 Croatian Cup matches and scored one goal.

Balaj started a new season with Rijeka retaining his starting place on 10 July 2015 in a goalless draw against Inter Zaprešić, but got substituted off for Roman Bezjak in the 58th minute. A few days later Balaj made his European debut for Rijeka playing the full 90-minutes in the 2015–16 UEFA Europa League Second qualifying round first-leg match against Aberdeen. Balaj scored his first goal of the season in his second league appearance, against Slaven Belupo Koprivnica in a 3–3 draw. During the 2015–16 season, with 9 league goals to his account, he was one of top 10 goalscorers in the league. Balaj also scored once in the Croatian Cup.

=== Akhmat Grozny ===
On 8 June 2016, Balaj completed a move to Russian Football Premier League side Terek Grozny for €550,000, signing a three-year contract with the option of another year. He was presented on the same day, where he was handed squad number 18. Balaj made his debut for the club on 31 July in the opening league match against Krylia Sovetov, playing for 59 minutes in an eventual 1–0 home win. Balaj was considered a high-quality reinforcement and played an important role in Terek Grozny's strong start to the season, and was described also as a physically strong forward who contributed both offensively and defensively, fitting well into Terek Grozny's playing style. It took him four matches to open his scoring account as he netted the first in the 3–1 away win versus Ufa on 20 August. This was followed by another one eight days later in the 2–1 turnaround win against Rostov. However those two goals were to open the floodgates of the strikers scoring in Russia, as he managed to score two consecutive braces in the matches against Ural and Zenit Saint Petersburg, leading the team to the win against the latter. For his performances Balaj was named Terek Grozny Player of the Month for October. Starting from April's month Balaj became a bench player despite being an important player for the team playing 22 first matches as a starter. On 21 May 2017 Balaj came in as a 73rd-minute substitute during the final league match against Krylia Sovetov Samara and after 3 minutes he scored the 3rd team goal in a match finished in the 3–1 victory, although the club ultimately finished fifth and narrowly missed qualifying for the UEFA Europa League by one point.

Balaj started the 2017–18 season by providing an assist for the 1–0 winning goal against FC Amkar Perm on 16 July 2017 scored by Léo Jabá. On 27 May 2019, Akhmat confirmed that Balaj left the club as a free agent upon the expiration of his contract.

=== Sturm Graz ===
On 26 July 2019, he signed a contract with Austrian club Sturm Graz for the term of 2 years with a 1-year extension option.

=== Nizhny Novgorod ===
On 21 July 2021, he returned to Russian Premier League and joined FC Nizhny Novgorod. On 16 January 2022, his contract with Nizhny Novgorod was terminated by mutual consent.

=== Boluspor ===
On 30 January 2022, Balaj returned to Turkey and signed with Boluspor.

=== Vllaznia return ===
On 18 January 2023, Vllaznia announced to have signed Balaj on a three-year contract, with the striker returning to his hometown club after thirteen years. Vllaznia reportedly beat the competition of Tirana and Partizani, who were also interested in signing the player. He was presented on the same day and reportedly became the highest paid player of the Kategoria Superiore, earning €12,000 a month.

In December 2025, Balaj was awarded the "Ballon D'or Albania" as the best footballer in Albania for that year.

== International career ==
=== Youth teams ===
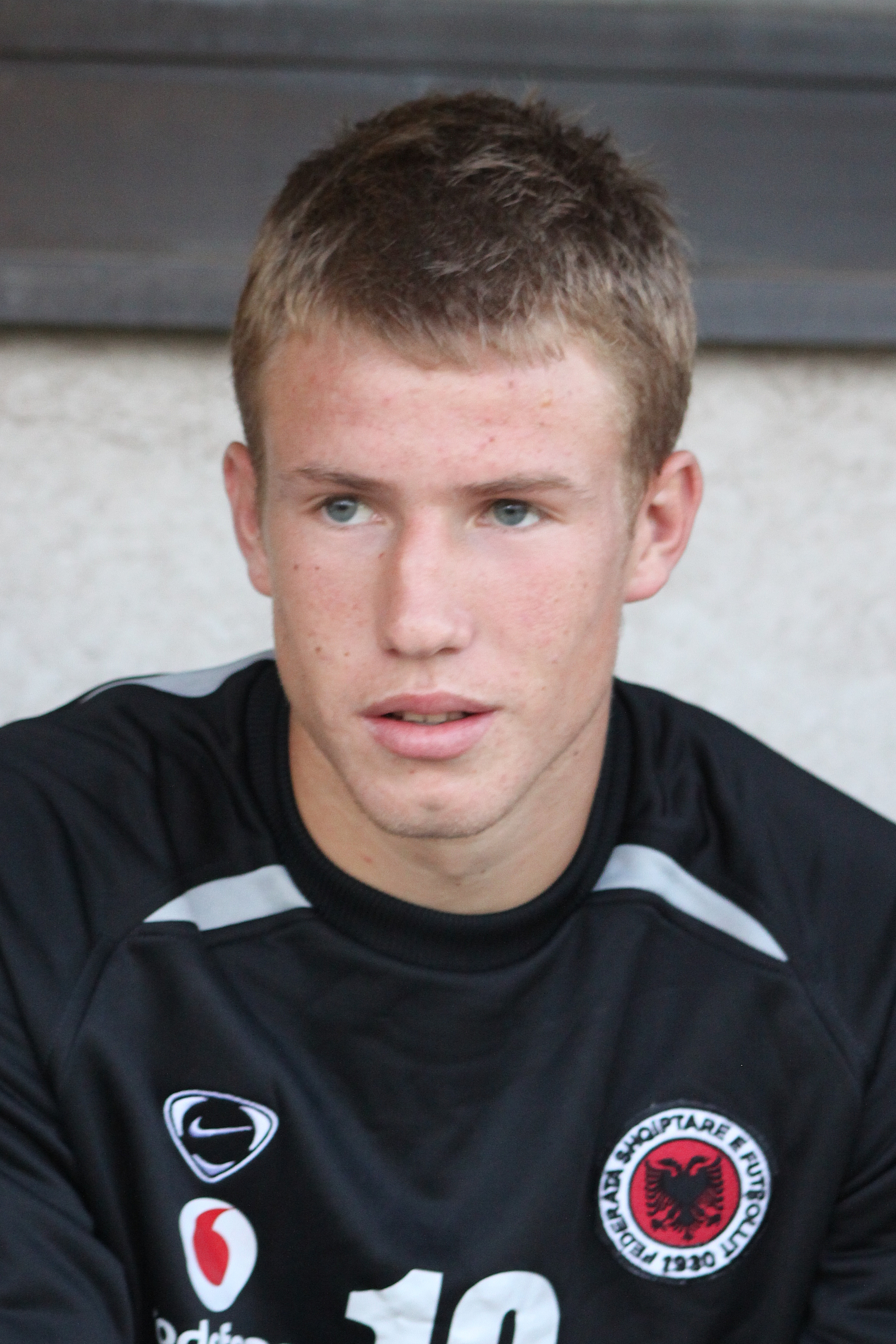
Balaj with Albania U21 in 2009

Balaj was part of the Albania U-19 squad for the qualifying stage of the 2009 European Championship, where he made his debut on 8 October 2008 against England at Ballymena Showgrounds, Northern Ireland by replacing Guido Tepshi at half time and where the match finished in the 3–0 loss for Albania. He scored his first and also Albania's only goal of the qualifying campaign, against Northern Ireland on 13 October 2008 at The Oval, Belfast in a 2–1 loss.

Balaj was called up at Albania national under-20 side by coach Artan Bushati to participate in the 2009 Mediterranean Games football tournament, which began on 25 June in Pescara, Italy. However he didn't feature in the tournament.

He was part of the under-21 side in their 2011 and the 2013 UEFA European Under-21 Championship qualification campaigns, scoring four goals in 13 matches.

=== Senior team ===
Balaj made his debut for Albania national football team on 17 February 2010 in the unofficial match against Kosovo, where he scored a goal. He received his first official call up by coach Gianni De Biasi for the friendly match against Cameroon on 14 November 2012.

Balaj was called up for the first time in competitive matches for Albania for the 2014 FIFA World Cup qualification two closing games against Switzerland and Cyprus on 11 and 15 October 2013. He made his competitive international debut in the final match of the 2014 FIFA World Cup qualification on 15 October 2013 against Cyprus where he came in as a substitute in place of Hamdi Salihi in the 87th minute of the match which finished 0–0.

==== UEFA Euro 2016 campaign ====
Balaj scored his first competitive goal for Albania on 7 September 2014, netting the only goal in a 1–0 away victory over Portugal in the opening match of the UEFA Euro 2016 qualifiers. He described his goal as a "striker's" goal. On 14 October 2014, Balaj started Albania's qualifying match against Serbia in Belgrade, which was abandoned following a pitch invasion by Serbian supporters. During the ensuing disturbances, a Serbian supporter struck Balaj on the shoulder with a plastic chair and then attempted to tackle him, instead bringing down Albania captain Lorik Cana, who had intervened to prevent the situation from escalating.

On 21 May 2016, Balaj was named in Albania's preliminary 27-man squad for UEFA Euro 2016, before being included in the final 23-man squad on 31 May. He remained an unused substitute in Albania's opening two matches, 1–0 defeats to Switzerland and hosts France, before appearing as a substitute for Armando Sadiku in the final group match against Romania. Sadiku scored the only goal in Albania's historic 1–0 victory, their first win at a major international tournament. Albania finished third in the group with three points and a goal difference of −2, but ranked last among the third-placed teams and were eliminated.

==== 2018 FIFA World Cup qualification ====
In the 2018 FIFA World Cup qualification opening match against Macedonia on 5 September 2016, Balaj came in as a 60th-minute substitute replacing the Midfielder Amir Abrashi to play in the attack line forming a duo partnership among Armando Sadiku. In the 75th minute the match was interrupted at score 1–1 due to the weather conditions and the remained 15 minutes were played in the next day. In the penultimate minute Balaj scored a goal to give Albania's the 2–1 victory.

== Personal life ==
Following Albania's historic participation at UEFA Euro 2016, Balaj was among the members of the national team who were issued diplomatic passports by the Albanian government in recognition of their achievement.

Balaj is considered a 'Don Juan' and has been in relationships with several models, including Einxhel Shkira, Viola Spiro, Elita Rudi, and Ilda Bejleri.

== Career statistics ==
=== Club ===
As of 12 December 2021

Appearances and goals by club, season and competition
Club	Season	League			National cup (Note: Includes Albanian Cup, Turkish Cup, Czech Cup, Polish Cup, Croatian Football Cup, Russian Cup, Austrian Cup)		Europe		Other		Total	
Club	Season	Division	Apps	Goals	Apps	Goals	Apps	Goals	Apps	Goals	Apps	Goals
Vllaznia	2007–08	Kategoria Superiore	1	0	0	0	—		—		1	0
Vllaznia	2008–09	Kategoria Superiore	7	0	5	1	—		—		12	1
Vllaznia	2009–10	Kategoria Superiore	30	9	6	3	4 (Note: Appearances in UEFA Europa League)	0	—		40	12
Vllaznia	Total		38	9	11	4	4	0	—		53	13
Gençlerbirliği	2010–11	Süper Lig	1	0	1	0	—		—		2	0
Tirana	2010–11	Kategoria Superiore	13	2	4	1	—		—		17	3
Tirana	2011–12	Kategoria Superiore	24	13	14	8	2	0	—		40	21
Tirana	2012–13	Kategoria Superiore	—		—		2	0	1 (Note: Appearance in Albanian Supercup)	1	3	1
Tirana	Total		37	15	18	9	4	0	1	1	60	25
Sparta Prague	2012–13	Czech First League	12	3	3	0	5	1	—		20	4
Jagiellonia	2013–14	Ekstraklasa	31	7	6	2	—		—		37	9
Slavia Prague	2014–15	Czech First League	13	3	0	0	—		—		13	3
Rijeka	2014–15	Croatian First Football League	15	9	3	1	—		—		18	10
Rijeka	2015–16	Croatian First Football League	31	9	4	1	2	0	—		37	10
Rijeka	Total		46	18	7	2	2	0	—		55	20
Akhmat Grozny	2016–17	Russian Premier League	26	9	1	0	—		—		27	9
Akhmat Grozny	2017–18	Russian Premier League	13	0	0	0	—		—		13	0
Akhmat Grozny	2018–19	Russian Premier League	22	3	2	1	—		—		24	4
Akhmat Grozny	Total		61	12	3	1	—		—		64	13
Sturm Graz	2019–20	Austrian Bundesliga	28	6	3	1	—		—		31	7
Sturm Graz	2020–21	Austrian Bundesliga	29	3	4	4	—		—		33	7
Sturm Graz	Total		57	9	7	5	—		—		64	14
Nizhny Novgorod	2021–22	Russian Premier League	15	0	0	0	—		—		15	0
Career total			311	76	56	23	15	1	1	1	383	101

=== International ===
As of 26 October 2022

Appearances and goals by national team and year
National team	Year	Apps	Goals
Albania	2012	1	0
Albania	2013	3	0
Albania	2014	5	1
Albania	2015	3	0
Albania	2016	8	2
Albania	2017	1	1
Albania	2018	9	1
Albania	2019	7	2
Albania	2020	4	1
Albania	2021	4	0
Albania	2022	3	1
Total		48	9

Scores and results list Albania's goal tally first, score column indicates score after each Balaj's goal.

International goals by date, venue, cap, opponent, score, result and competition
No.	Date	Venue	Cap	Opponent	Score	Result	Competition
1	7 September 2014	Estádio Municipal de Aveiro, Aveiro, Portugal	5	Portugal	1–0	1–0	UEFA Euro 2016 qualification
2	5 September 2016	Loro Boriçi Stadium, Shkodër, Albania	17	Macedonia	2–1	2–1	2018 FIFA World Cup qualification
3	6 October 2016	Rheinpark Stadion, Vaduz, Liechtenstein	18	Liechtenstein	2–0	2–0	2018 FIFA World Cup qualification
4	28 March 2017	Elbasan Arena, Elbasan, Albania	21	Bosnia and Herzegovina	1–2	1–2	Friendly
5	20 November 2018	Elbasan Arena, Elbasan, Albania	30	Wales	1–0	1–0	Friendly
6	25 March 2019	Estadi Nacional, Andorra la Vella, Andorra	31	Andorra	2–0	3–0	UEFA Euro 2020 qualification
7	14 November 2019	Elbasan Arena, Elbasan, Albania	36	Andorra	1–0	2–2	UEFA Euro 2020 qualification
8	11 November 2020	Elbasan Arena, Elbasan, Albania	39	Kosovo	1–0	2–1	Friendly
9	26 October 2022	Al Nahyan Stadium, Abu Dhabi, United Arab Emirates	45	Saudi Arabia	1–1	1–1	Friendly

== Honours ==
Vllaznia

- Albanian Cup: 2007–08; runner-up: 2009–10

Tirana

- Albanian Cup: 2010–11, 2011–12
- Albanian Supercup: 2011

Individual

- Kategoria Superiore Talent of the Season: 2011–12
- Kategoria Superiore Top Scorer: 2023–24
