= Erjon =

- Gender: Male
- Language: Albanian

Origin
- Origin: erë (wind) + jon (the Ionian sea).
- Region of origin: Albania, Kosovo

Erjon is an Albanian masculine given name. It is a spelling variant of Erion, and means "Ionian wind". One theory is that it is of mythological origin. The name may refer to:

- Erjon Bogdani (born 1977), Albanian footballer
- Erjon Dollapi (born 1993), Albanian-born British rugby player
- Erjon Dragoj (born 1999), Albanian footballer
- Erjon Dushku (born 1985), Albanian footballer
- Erjon Kastrati (born 1994), Kosovar-Albanian basketball player
- Erjon Llapanji (born 1985), Albanian footballer
- Erjon Mustafaj (born 1989), Albanian footballer
- Erjon Rizvanolli (born 1981), Albanian footballer
- Erjon Tola (born 1986), Albanian skier
- Erjon Vuçaj (born 1990), Albanian footballer
