= Klodian Duro =

Albanian footballer and coach (born 1977)

Personal information
- Date of birth: 21 December 1977 (age 48)
- Place of birth: Tirana, Albania
- Height: 1.77 m (5 ft 10 in)
- Position: Attacking midfielder

Youth career
- 1994–1996: Elbasani

Senior career*
Years	Team	Apps	(Gls)
1996–1998	Elbasani	44	(7)
1998–1999	Tirana	27	(1)
1999	Elbasani	11	(0)
2000–2001	Vllaznia Shkodër	44	(8)
2002	Samsunspor	9	(0)
2002–2003	Malatyaspor	18	(3)
2003–2004	Partizani Tirana	11	(3)
2004	→ Rizespor (loan)	11	(1)
2004–2005	Arminia Bielefeld	19	(0)
2005–2008	Tirana	84	(25)
2008–2009	Omonia	26	(6)
2009–2010	Apollon Limassol	24	(0)
2010–2011	LASK	18	(2)
2011–2013	Tirana	30	(4)
Total		376	(60)

International career
1997–1999	Albania U21	12	(1)
2001–2011	Albania	77	(6)

Managerial career
- 2015–2016: Kukësi
- 2018: Kamza
- 2019: Luftëtari FC
- 2020–2021: Feronikeli
- 2022: Lushnja
- 2023: Gjilani
- 2025: Liria Prizren
- 2026–: Besëlidhja Lezhë
- * Club domestic league appearances and goals

Klodian Duro (Albanian pronunciation: [klɔ'dian 'duɾɔ]; born 21 December 1977) is an Albanian former professional footballer and football coach.

Over a senior career spanning 17 years, he represented 11 clubs across five countries — Albania, Turkey, Germany, Cyprus and Austria.

Duro began his professional career with Elbasani in 1996 and later played for Tirana, Vllaznia Shkodër and Partizani Tirana. He also spent several seasons abroad, appearing in the Süper Lig with Samsunspor, Malatyaspor and Çaykur Rizespor, in the Bundesliga with Arminia Bielefeld, in the Cypriot First Division with Omonia and Apollon Limassol, and in the Austrian Bundesliga with LASK. His 2007–08 season with Tirana, in which he scored 15 league goals, was among the strongest of his domestic career.

During his career, Duro won four Albanian Superliga titles, three Albanian Cups, three Albanian Supercups, and the Cypriot Cup.

He made his senior international debut for the Albania national team in 2001 and went on to earn 77 caps and score six goals before retiring from international football in 2011. Over ten years, Duro featured regularly for the national side and appeared in four major qualifying campaigns, working under five different head coaches. Used in various midfield roles, he was often involved in set pieces and contributed both as a passer and as a link between midfield and attack. He also captained Albania on several occasions. During this period, he took part in a number of notable qualifying results and long defensive and unbeaten sequences achieved by the team in the mid-2000s.

His brother, Albert Duro, was also a professional footballer.

After retiring as a player, Duro transitioned into coaching. He became the manager of Kukësi on 24 November 2015 and guided the team to victory in the Albanian Cup in his first season in charge.

== Club career ==
=== Early career ===
Duro began his professional career in 1996 with Elbasani, making his debut in the 1996–97 Albanian National Championship, where he played 13 matches as the team finished 13th after the final phase. In the following season, the 1997–98 Albanian National Championship, he made 31 out of 34 league appearances and scored 7 goals, helping Elbasani finish in 6th place.

In 1998, Duro transferred to Tirana, where he made 27 appearances from 30 possible matches and scored once during the 1998–99 Albanian National Championship. Tirana won the championship title and qualified for the Champions League first qualifying round of the following season. He also featured in the 1998–99 Albanian Cup final, played on 22 May 1999 against Vllaznia, a match decided by a penalty shoot-out. Tirana scored three of their four penalties — with Duro missing one — while Vllaznia failed to convert their first three attempts. This victory secured Tirana the domestic double for the 1998–99 season.

After his spell with Tirana, Duro returned briefly to Elbasani for the 1999–2000 Albanian National Championship, where he made 11 league appearances before transferring mid-season to Vllaznia Shkodër.

With Vllaznia, he played a further 9 league matches and scored once. The team finished 4th in the league and entered the Intertoto Cup first round.

Duro appeared in both Intertoto Cup first-round matches in June 2000 against Nea Salamis, with Vllaznia losing both legs and being eliminated 6–2 on aggregate.

In the 2000–01 Albanian National Championship, Duro made 24 league appearances and scored 5 goals, as Vllaznia won the league title. During the 2000–01 Albanian Cup, Duro also scored twice in the quarter-finals.

In July 2001, Duro played in the UEFA Champions League first qualifying round, featuring in both legs against Icelandic side KR Reykjavík. He scored in both matches, as Vllaznia advanced on the away goals rule after losing 2–1 away and winning 1–0 at home. In the second qualifying round, Vllaznia were eliminated by Turkish champions Galatasaray, losing 6–1 on aggregate. In the first half of the 2001–02 Albanian National Championship, Duro made 11 league appearances and scored 2 goals before leaving Albania to continue his career abroad in Turkey.

=== Turkey and Partizani ===
He also had spells abroad, featuring in the Süper Lig for Samsunspor, Malatyaspor and Çaykur Rizespor.

Duro joined Samsunspor on 30 January 2002. He made his Süper Lig debut on 2 February 2002 in a goalless draw against Beşiktaş, where he was booked in the 81st minute and substituted shortly after. He received another booking in the following match against Trabzonspor. In the subsequent rounds he appeared both as a starter and as a substitute, recording his third caution within his first five league appearances. On matchday 29, he received a direct red card in the 68th minute against Yimpaş Yozgatspor, which resulted in a two-match suspension as per competition regulations.

He finished the season with nine league appearances in the 2001–02 Süper Lig, as Samsunspor ended the campaign in 15th place, avoiding relegation by a single point.

On 29 August 2002, Duro transferred to Malatyaspor, making his debut on 14 September in a league match against Fenerbahçe, where he scored his first goal for the club in the 41st minute in a 2–0 win. In the early rounds of the season he collected several cautions, including three yellow cards within the first six league fixtures and a further booking later on. He also received a straight red card later in the campaign. On 14 October 2002 he provided two assists in a 5–4 win against Gençlerbirliği, and on 16 March 2003 he scored once and assisted another goal in a 2–0 victory over Altay.

In total, Duro made 20 appearances in all competitions for Malatyaspor, including their run to the Turkish Cup semi-finals. In the league he registered four goals and six assists, as the club finished in 5th place and qualified for the UEFA Cup first round.

After leaving Malatyaspor on 29 August 2003, Duro signed with Partizani Tirana. During the first half of the 2003–04 Kategoria Superiore season, he made 11 league appearances and scored 3 goals.

On 6 January 2004, Partizani loaned him to Çaykur Rizespor for the second half of the season. He made 11 league appearances and scored 1 goal in the 2003–04 Süper Lig, contributing to the club’s 14th-place finish as they avoided relegation by just two points.

=== Arminia Bielefeld ===
Duro transferred to the Bundesliga with Arminia Bielefeld, where he joined fellow Albanian international attacking midfielders Ervin Skela and Fatmir Vata. He was largely considered a second-choice option in midfield for the 2004–05 Bundesliga. He made his debut on 28 August 2004 against VfL Bochum, playing the final 16 minutes in a 2–1 defeat. Only a month later he provided a decisive assist against Hannover 96, setting up the winning goal in the 79th minute just eight minutes after replacing fellow Albanian Skela. Another crucial assist came on 13 November in an away match against SC Freiburg, delivering the pass for the 86th-minute winner in a 3–2 victory. That same month he also completed his only full 90-minute appearance of the 2004–05 campaign, featuring in the DFB-Pokal Round of 16 against Karlsruher SC to help secure a 4–0 win and progression to the quarter-finals. He finished the season with 21 total appearances, while Arminia placed 13th in the league.

=== Tirana return ===
Duro chose to return to Albania, signing a three-year contract with Tirana. He made his debut on 24 September 2005 in a 3–0 league win over Skënderbeu Korçë in the 2005–06 Kategoria Superiore. He went on to play 29 league matches and scored 4 goals, as Tirana finished as runners-up behind Elbasani.

In the 2005–06 Albanian Cup, he scored in consecutive rounds, including the semi-final victory over Dinamo (4–2) and the decisive winning goal in the final against Vllaznia, securing a 1–0 triumph and the cup title for Tirana. He also featured in the 2006 Albanian Supercup on 19 August, helping the team claim the trophy with a 2–0 win against Elbasani.

He began the season in July 2006 with Tirana’s participation in the 2006–07 UEFA Cup qualifying rounds. In the first qualifying round against Croatian side Varteks, Duro played in both legs; the first match ended in a 1–1 draw, while Tirana won the return leg 2–0, where Duro, however, was sent off late in the match after receiving two yellow cards in the 78th and 90th minutes. In the second qualifying round against Turkish club Kayserispor, Tirana suffered a 2–0 home defeat in the first leg without Duro, and were again defeated 3–1 in the return leg in Turkey despite Duro playing the full 90 minutes.

In the 2006–07 Kategoria Superiore, he made 27 league appearances and scored 6 goals, helping Tirana secure the league title. In the 2006–07 Albanian Cup, he scored twice across the rounds, including a goal in the quarter-final tie against Teuta, although Tirana were eliminated 4–3 on aggregate. He also featured in the 2007 Albanian Supercup, scoring a goal in the 4–2 victory over Besa Kavajë that secured the trophy for Tirana.

During the 2007–08 season, Duro began the campaign with Tirana’s participation in the 2007–08 UEFA Champions League qualifying rounds, featuring in the first qualifying round against Slovenian champions Domžale in July 2007. He scored Tirana’s only goal of the tie, but the team was eliminated 3–1 on aggregate.

In the 2007–08 Kategoria Superiore, he became the club’s leading goalscorer with 15 league goals, finishing as the joint third top scorer in the championship, although Tirana finished in 6th place.

In the 2007–08 Albanian Cup, Duro contributed with more goals, scoring in the quarter-finals and adding two more in the two-legged semi-final against Elbasani—one in the 3–0 first-leg victory and another in the 3–1 second-leg defeat—proving decisive for Tirana’s 4–3 aggregate qualification for the final. He played 45 minutes in the 2008 Albanian Cup Final against Vllaznia, striking the crossbar during the match, but Tirana ultimately lost the final and missed out on qualification for UEFA competitions.

=== Omonia Nicosia ===
On 19 May 2008, Duro completed a transfer to Cypriot outfit Omonia Nicosia, signing a two-year contract until June 2010. He was subsequently included in Nedim Tutić's squad for the 2008–09 UEFA Cup qualifying rounds. Duro made his competitive debut in the first leg of the first qualifying round against Milano Kumanovo, helping the team to a 2–0 victory. He also appeared in the second leg, with Omonia winning again to progress 4–1 on aggregate.

His first goal contributions came on 28 August in the second leg of the second qualifying round against AEK Athens, where he scored twice at Neo GSP Stadium, including one from 25 yards, securing a 2–2 draw. As Omonia had won the first leg 1–0, his goals ensured qualification to the next round.

He made his league debut four days later, scoring in the 15th minute of the season opener against Enosis Neon Paralimni, a match Omonia won 2–0 away from home.

Duro scored again on 18 September, this time via a free-kick, giving Omonia the lead against Premier League side Manchester City. Despite his opener, Manchester City won the match 2–1. Omonia lost the second leg by the same score, exiting the competition 4–2 on aggregate.

He scored his first career hat-trick on 14 December 2008, netting three times within ten minutes in a 4–1 home win over APOP Kinyras. He scored again in a 7–1 victory over Enosis Neon Paralimni.

Duro made 20 league appearances through the end of the first round, as Omonia finished as runners-up and advanced to Group A of the second round. He featured in all six matches of the championship group, scoring once more—his ninth and final goal of the season—as Omonia collected 13 points, finishing one point behind champions APOEL.

=== Apollon Limassol ===
In the summer of 2009, Duro joined Apollon Limassol FC on a two-year contract. He immediately established himself as an important member of the squad during the 2009–10 Cypriot First Division, making 21 league appearances—frequently completing the full 90 minutes—and contributing to a series of strong team performances, particularly in matches where Apollon recorded clean-sheet victories.

Apollon finished the first round in third place with 57 points from 26 matches, securing a place in Group A of the championship round. Duro made three substitute appearances during the six Group A fixtures, in which Apollon failed to record a win, finishing the round with three draws and three losses.

=== LASK ===
In August 2010, Duro moved to Austria and signed a one-year contract with LASK of the Austrian Football Bundesliga. He began the season as an unused substitute in the opening two league fixtures before making his competitive debut on 17 September in the early rounds of the Austrian Cup, where he scored a hat-trick in a 4–2 away win over 1. SC Sollenau. Following his cup performance, Duro played the full 90 minutes four days later in a 4–0 league defeat to SK Sturm Graz. He remained a starter in the next match and scored his first Bundesliga goal for LASK on 25 September, converting a 17th-minute penalty in a 3–3 draw against SV Mattersburg. Approaching the mid-season period, Duro added his second league goal in November in a 4–1 defeat to Kapfenberger SV. He continued to feature through late 2010, although LASK struggled for results and entered a winless run. At the start of the 2011 spring phase his playing time was reduced, and LASK remained at the bottom of the table. Duro returned to the starting XI in mid-March, featuring in a 0–0 away draw against SK Rapid Wien, though he was sent off shortly after the hour mark. On 9 April 2011 he completed the full 90 minutes in a 1–0 win over FC Red Bull Salzburg, which was the team’s second league victory of the season. He made only sporadic appearances thereafter as LASK were relegated at the end of the campaign. Duro finished the season with 17 league appearances and two Bundesliga goals, in addition to his hat-trick in the Austrian Cup.

=== Return to Tirana (third spell) ===
Duro returned to Albania in September 2011 for a third spell with Tirana, signing a two-year contract on a free transfer after reaching an agreement with the club’s management.

He was not available during the opening weeks of the campaign and made his first appearance of the season on 1 October, starting in a 2–0 home victory over Flamurtari. He soon established himself as a regular starter and scored his first league goal of the season in the following round against Vllaznia, equalising in the 78th minute to secure a 2–2 draw. He continued as a regular starter, often completing the full 90 minutes, and played an important role in maintaining the team’s strong early-season form. With Duro on the pitch, Tirana recorded mostly wins and remained consistently within the top two places during the first phase of the championship, positioning themselves as title contenders. In February 2012, Duro was suspended indefinitely by Tirana after a disagreement with coach Julián Rubio regarding his availability and involvement in the squad for a matchday against Teuta. He was returned back in mid-March and continued to feature in the majority of games throughout the second phase, during which Tirana briefly held first place. However, a run including three defeats—including a key loss to title rivals Skënderbeu—caused the team to drop down the table, ultimately finishing the season in third place, which nonetheless secured qualification for the 2012–13 UEFA Europa League first qualifying round. In the 2012 Albanian Cup final against Skënderbeu, Duro entered the match as an extra-time substitute in the 103rd minute and contributed to the build-up leading to Tirana’s winning goal four minutes later, securing the club the trophy.

In the UEFA Europa League first qualifying round, Duro started the first leg in July against CS Grevenmacher, playing 66 minutes and contributing to both goals in the team’s 2–0 home win. However, he was subsequently excluded from the squad due to repeated conflicts with coach Rubio. Without Duro on play, Tirana drew 0–0 in the second leg against Grevenmacher and advanced, but were comprehensively eliminated in the following round by Norwegian side Aalesunds FK with a 6–1 aggregate score.

Duro returned back featuring in the 2012 Albanian Supercup final on 18 August 2012 against Skënderbeu, coming on as a substitute in the 69th minute with the score level at 1–1. Despite Tirana being reduced to ten men following a red card in the 82nd minute, Duro played a decisive role in the final minute of normal play when he carried the ball forward through midfield before releasing a pass on the right to Gilman Lika, whose ensuing cross into the area was deflected into the net as an own goal by Marko Radaš for the winning goal. Tirana finished the match with nine players after Lika received a second yellow card for excessive celebration, but held on to secure the Albanian Supercup.

In the opening match of the 2012–13 Kategoria Superiore season on 28 August 2012, Duro scored the winning goal from the penalty spot in the 31st minute against Tomori Berat. After the departure of head coach Rubio, Duro initially remained a starter under his replacement Artur Lekbello, though he was gradually moved to the bench due to tactical preferences. Lekbello left the club after less than two months, and Duro returned to the starting lineup under caretaker manager Alban Tafaj, scoring decisive winning goals against Vllaznia in November (1–0) and Laçi in December (2–1). With the arrival of head coach Nevil Dede he again lost his starting place, and made the final appearance of his career on 10 March 2013 against Besa Kavajë.

== International career ==
Duro was a member of the Albania national under-21 football team during the 2000 UEFA European Under-21 Championship qualification, where he made 8 appearances and contributed to the team's tally of one win and two draws.

Duro earned 77 caps for the Albania national team between 2001 and 2011, scoring six goals. At the time of his retirement from international football, his 77 appearances ranked him second in the all-time list of Albania caps, behind Altin Lala with 79, and the top-10 list was largely composed of players active mainly during the 1990s and 2000s, with few representatives from the early 2010s.

Following impressive performances with Vllaznia in the Albanian championship, Duro received his first senior call-up from head coach Medin Zhega for the 2002 FIFA World Cup qualification match against England on 28 March 2001, where he was named on the bench but remained an unused substitute. He made his senior debut in the following month, appearing as a late substitute in the 2–0 away victory against Turkey on 25 April 2001 at the Kamil Ocak Stadium in Gaziantep.

After the conclusion of the 2002 FIFA World Cup qualification, Duro became a regular starter under head coach Sulejman Demollari during the 2001–02 friendly period, regularly completing full 90-minute appearances. He continued in this role following the appointment of Italian coach Giuseppe Dossena ahead of the UEFA Euro 2004 qualifying campaign. He made his competitive debut on 12 October 2002 in the opening qualifier, a 1–1 draw against Switzerland. Four days later, he scored his first senior international goal in the 13th minute of Albania’s 4–1 away defeat to Russia on 16 October 2002. Following the match, head coach Dossena was dismissed and replaced in December 2002 by German manager Hans-Peter Briegel. Under Briegel, Duro appeared again in the next qualifier against Russia on 29 March 2003, during which he won a penalty in the early minutes but did not convert it; Albania went on to win the match 3–1. Throughout the remainder of the qualifying campaign, Duro was used consistently, missing only one half of play. He also took part in several notable results, including a draw against the Republic of Ireland and a 3–1 win over Georgia in the closing stages, which enabled Albania to finish above Georgia in the group standings.

In the 2006 FIFA World Cup qualifying campaign, Duro remained a regular starter, featuring from the beginning in 8 of Albania’s first 9 matches and playing the majority of minutes, although he was often substituted in the second half. The campaign began with a notable 2–1 home victory over reigning European champions Greece on 4 September 2004, a result regarded as one of Albania’s most significant competitive wins. The match was followed by a serious incident in Greece, where an Albanian immigrant was killed during post-match tensions, an event that cast a somber note over the celebrations. Despite the promising start, Albania soon faced a demanding schedule against high-calibre opponents such as Ukraine, Denmark and Turkey, suffering a series of narrow defeats, five of which ended with identical 2–0 scorelines. On 4 June 2005, Duro played the full 90 minutes against Georgia, helping Albania secure a 3–2 victory in a match where the team produced one of its most convincing performances of the campaign, leading 3–0 by the 56th minute. Four days later, against Denmark, head coach Briegel opted for a more defensive tactical approach due to the rise of several defensive players, and Duro subsequently fell out of the starting lineup, dropping on the bench for the final four matches of the campaign. The team collected a modest number of points in the closing fixtures but still achieved historic milestones, finishing third from bottom in the group for the first time and setting a new record points total with 13 points.

In the following UEFA Euro 2008 qualifying campaign, Duro missed the opening phase in late 2006 but returned at the beginning of 2007, resuming his position as a regular starter and becoming almost ever-present throughout the year. Albania recorded four consecutive clean sheets in the first half of 2007, with goalless draws against Slovenia and Bulgaria in March, during the latter of which Duro was named captain by head coach Otto Barić. This run was followed by back-to-back victories over Luxembourg in June. On 22 August 2007, Duro scored his second international goal in a 3–0 friendly win over Malta, a result that extended Albania’s run to five matches without conceding, setting a new national team record. In the reverse fixture against Bulgaria on 17 October 2007, he opened the scoring with a direct free-kick in the 32nd minute, with the match ending in a 1–1 draw. For the second time in a row, Albania concluded the qualifying campaign in fifth place in the seven-team group.

During the 2010 FIFA World Cup qualifying campaign, Duro began as an important first-team member for Albania, contributing to a strong opening month in September 2008. He featured in back-to-back clean sheets — a goalless draw against contenders Sweden, which marked his 50th cap, followed by a 3–0 home victory over Malta, in which he both scored and provided an assist — results that briefly placed Albania at the top of the group. The team continued to show competitive resilience the following month: despite a setback away to Hungary, Albania earned a 0–0 draw against Portugal in Lisbon on 15 October 2008, holding on after being reduced to ten men shortly before half-time. As the campaign progressed into 2009, Albania began to struggle offensively, recording several goalless performances — including a 0–0 draw away to Malta — and narrow defeats such as the 1–0 loss to Hungary and a 3–0 away defeat to Denmark. These results increased criticism of head coach Arie Haan and his 4–5–1 system, which was viewed as limiting the team’s attacking output. Duro nevertheless remained a consistent figure in midfield, playing the majority of available minutes until Haan’s dismissal in mid-2009. Under his successor, Croatian coach Josip Kuže, he retained his role as a regular starter as Albania displayed brief signs of improvement, including scoring in a competitive 2–1 home loss to Portugal and earning a 1–1 draw against Denmark. The team switched to a more attacking 4–4–2 structure during this period, resulting in an uptick in goals compared to earlier stages of the campaign. However, form remained uneven, and the qualifiers concluded with a 4–1 defeat to Sweden. Overall, Duro was one of the squad’s most consistently used players across the campaign, maintaining a near-constant presence on the pitch under both managers.

In the post-qualification period, Duro continued to appear regularly, featuring in all five friendly matches. Albania kept five consecutive clean sheets and earned four straight 1–0 victories, setting two national team records. Duro took part in the longest run of matches without conceding — the second such defensive streak of his international career — and in the team’s joint-record four-match winning sequence.

During the UEFA Euro 2012 qualifying campaign, Duro remained an almost ever-present figure in Albania’s midfield, continuing his long-standing role as a regular starter. He opened the campaign in September 2010 by starting both of Albania’s first two matches, contributing to a solid beginning: a 1–1 draw against Romania and a 1–0 home victory over Luxembourg. In the following match, on 8 October 2010, he scored the equaliser in a 1–1 home draw against Bosnia–Herzegovina with a free-kick in first-half added time, a result that extended Albania’s unbeaten run to eight matches — setting a new national record — and briefly lifted the team to the top of Group D. The unbeaten run ended with a 2–0 away loss to Belarus, after which head coach Kuže introduced a tactical switch to a 4–4–2 system, leading to Duro’s move to the bench. Albania responded in the return fixture with a 1–0 home victory. Duro went on to make his final international appearance on 7 October 2011, playing the full 90 minutes in a 3–0 defeat against France.

== Managerial career ==
=== Kukësi ===
On 24 November 2015, Duro was appointed as the new coach of Albanian Superliga side FK Kukësi, replacing Marcello Troisi, who was dismissed by the club directors due to lack of results. During his presentation, Duro stated that the club's main objective was to qualify for European competitions in the following season.

In his first match in charge, Kukësi fell 0–1 at the Zeqir Ymeri Stadium against Partizani Tirana. He earned his first win four days later, leading Kukësi to a 1–0 away victory over Flamurtari Vlorë. Duro won the Albanian Cup in his first season, after defeating Laçi on penalties on 22 May 2016. Despite club president Safet Gjici stating that Duro would remain for the following season, he left the club on 6 June and was replaced by Hasan Lika.

=== Kamza ===
On 4 September 2018, Kamza announced that they had appointed Duro as the new team manager. His debut came on 12 September, in a 2–0 away win against Besa Kavajë in the first round of the Albanian Cup. He recorded his first league win with Kamza in a 2–0 home victory over newly promoted Kastrioti Krujë.

=== Luftëtari Gjirokastër ===
On 19 August 2019, Duro was appointed manager of Luftëtari Gjirokastër. His tenure was brief, concluding in September 2019.

=== Feronikeli ===
In October 2020, Duro took charge of KF Feronikeli in the Kosovo Superleague, managing the club until May 2021.

=== Lushnja ===
In July 2022, he was appointed manager of KF Lushnja, a role he held until October 2022.

=== Gjilani ===
In July 2023, Duro became manager of KF Gjilani, serving in the position until August 2023.

== Personal life ==
According to multiple sources, Duro has referred to former Albanian international Albert Duro as his brother.

In October 2021, Duro publicly expressed grief over the death of his father, Ilmi Duro.

== Career statistics ==
=== Club ===
Appearances and goals by club, season and competition
Club	Season	League			Cup		Continental		Total	
Club	Season	Division	Apps	Goals	Apps	Goals	Apps	Goals	Apps	Goals
Elbasani	1996–97	Albanian Superliga	13	0	—		—		13	0
Elbasani	1997–98	Albanian Superliga	31	7	—		—		31	7
Elbasani	Total		44	7	0	0	0	0	44	7
Tirana	1998–99	Albanian Superliga	27	1	1	0	—		28	1
Elbasani	1999–2000	Albanian Superliga	11	0	—		—		11	0
Vllaznia Shkodër	1999–2000	Albanian Superliga	9	1	—		—		9	1
Vllaznia Shkodër	2000–01	Albanian Superliga	24	5	1	2	2	0	27	7
Vllaznia Shkodër	2001–02	Albanian Superliga	11	2	—		4	2	15	4
Vllaznia Shkodër	Total		44	8	1	2	6	2	51	12
Samsunspor	2001–02	Süper Lig	9	0	—		—		9	0
Malatyaspor	2002–03	Süper Lig	18	3	2	0	—		20	3
Partizani Tirana	2003–04	Albanian Superliga	11	3	—		—		11	3
Çaykur Rizespor	2003–04	Süper Lig	11	1	1	2	—		12	3
Arminia Bielefeld	2004–05	Bundesliga	19	0	2	0	—		21	0
Tirana	2005–06	Albanian Superliga	29	4	2	2	—		31	6
Tirana	2006–07	Albanian Superliga	27	6	3	3	—		30	9
Tirana	2007–08	Albanian Superliga	28	15	4	4	2	1	34	20
Tirana	Total		84	25	9	9	2	1	95	35
Omonia	2008–09	Cypriot First Division	26	6	—		5	3	31	9
Apollon Limassol	2009–10	Cypriot First Division	24	0	0	0	—		24	0
LASK	2010–11	Austrian Bundesliga	18	2	2	3	—		20	5
Tirana	2011–12	Albanian Superliga	17	1	7	1	—		24	2
Tirana	2012–13	Albanian Superliga	13	3	2	0	1	0	16	3
Tirana	Total		30	4	9	1	1	1	40	5
Career total			376	60	27	17	14	5	417	82

=== International ===
Appearances and goals by national team and year
National team	Year	Apps	Goals
Albania	2001	1	0
Albania	2002	8	1
Albania	2003	11	0
Albania	2004	7	0
Albania	2005	6	0
Albania	2006	3	0
Albania	2007	11	2
Albania	2008	7	1
Albania	2009	8	1
Albania	2010	9	1
Albania	2011	6	0
Total		77	6

==== International goals ====
Scores and results list Albania's goal tally first, score column indicates score after each Duro goal.

List of international goals scored by Duro.
No.	Date	Venue	Cap	Opponent	Score	Result	Competition
1	16 October 2002	Central Stadium, Volgograd, Russia	9	Russia	1–1	1–4	UEFA Euro 2004 qualifying
2	22 August 2007	Qemal Stafa Stadium, Tirana, Albania	42	Malta	3–0	3–0	Friendly
3	17 October 2007	Qemal Stafa Stadium, Tirana, Albania	45	Bulgaria	1–0	1–1	UEFA Euro 2008 qualifying
4	10 September 2008	Qemal Stafa Stadium, Tirana, Albania	51	Malta	2–0	3–0	2010 FIFA World Cup qualification
5	12 August 2009	Qemal Stafa Stadium, Tirana, Albania	59	Cyprus	4–1	6–1	Friendly
6	7 October 2010	Qemal Stafa Stadium, Tirana, Albania	69	Bosnia and Herzegovina	1–1	1–1	UEFA Euro 2012 qualifying

=== Managerial ===
As of 15 September 2018

Managerial record by club and tenure
Team	From	To	Record					Ref.
Team	From	To	M	W	D	L	Win %	Ref.
Kukësi	24 November 2015	6 June 2016	29	15	8	6	51.7	
Kamza	4 September 2018		2	2	0	0	100.0	
Luftëtari FC								
Feronikeli								
Lushnja								
Gjilani		Present						
Total			31	17	8	6	54.8	

== Honours ==
Honours achieved by Duro.

=== Player ===
Tirana

- Albanian Superliga: 1998–99, 2006–07
- Albanian Cup: 1998–99, 2005–06, 2011–12
- Albanian Supercup: 2006, 2012

Vllaznia Shkodër

- Albanian Superliga: 2000–01
- Albanian Supercup: 2001

Apollon Limassol

- Cypriot Cup: 2009–10

=== Manager ===
Kukësi

- Albanian Cup: 2015–16
