= Nertil Ferraj =

Albanian footballer

Personal information
- Full name: Nertil Ferraj
- Date of birth: 11 September 1987 (age 39)
- Place of birth: Vlorë, Albania
- Height: 1.87 m (6 ft 2 in)
- Position: Winger

Team information
- Current team: Luzi United
- Number: 11

Youth career
- 2005–2011: Dinamo Tirana

Senior career*
| Years | Team | Apps | (Gls) |
| 2005–2011 | Dinamo Tirana | 80 | (3) |
| 2011–2013 | Tirana | 29 | (0) |
| 2013–2014 | Kastrioti | 29 | (4) |
| 2014–2015 | Dinamo Tirana | 22 | (1) |
| 2015–2016 | Teuta Durrës | 7 | (0) |
| 2016 | Kukësi | 8 | (0) |
| 2016–2017 | Kamza | 23 | (1) |
| 2017–2019 | Vora | 9 | (1) |
| 2020– | Luzi United | 21 | (3) |

International career
| 2005–2006 | Albania U19 | 3 | (0) |
| 2007–2008 | Albania U21 | 1 | (0) |
- * Club domestic league appearances and goals as of 18 May 2023

Nertil Ferraj (born 11 September 1987) is an Albanian footballer who plays for Luzi United in the Kategoria e Parë.

== Club career ==
=== Dinamo Tirana ===
On 5 September 2014, Ferraj returned to his first club Dinamo Tirana, at that time in Kategoria e Parë by signing a one-year deal.

=== Teuta Durrës ===
In August 2015, Ferraj signed with Teuta Durrës of Kategoria Superiore, taking the number 18 in the process. He made his debut on 22 August in team's opening match of the season, a 0–1 away win over Flamurtari Vlorë, appearing as a 67th-minute substitute for fellow debutant Eri Lamçja. During the first part of the season, Ferraj struggled to find spaces in Magani's lineup, but find it very hard as he made only seven league appearances, all of them as a substitute, and eventually left the team on 13 January of the following year by mutual consensus.

=== Kukësi ===
On 18 January 2016, Ferraj joined fellow Kategoria Superiore side Kukësi by signing a deal until the end of the season. In the first leg of the quarter-final of Albanian Cup against his former club Teuta Durrës, Ferraj was an unused substitute in his team 1–0 away lose. Eight days later, Ferraj made his league debut with the club, appearing as an 81st-minute substitute in the 3–0 home win against Bylis Ballsh.

== Honours ==
=== Club ===
Dinamo Tirana

- Albanian Superliga (2): 2007–08, 2009–10

KF Tirana

- Albanian Cup (1): 2011–12
- Albanian Supercup (2): 2011, 2012
