= Gerald Tusha =

Albanian footballer

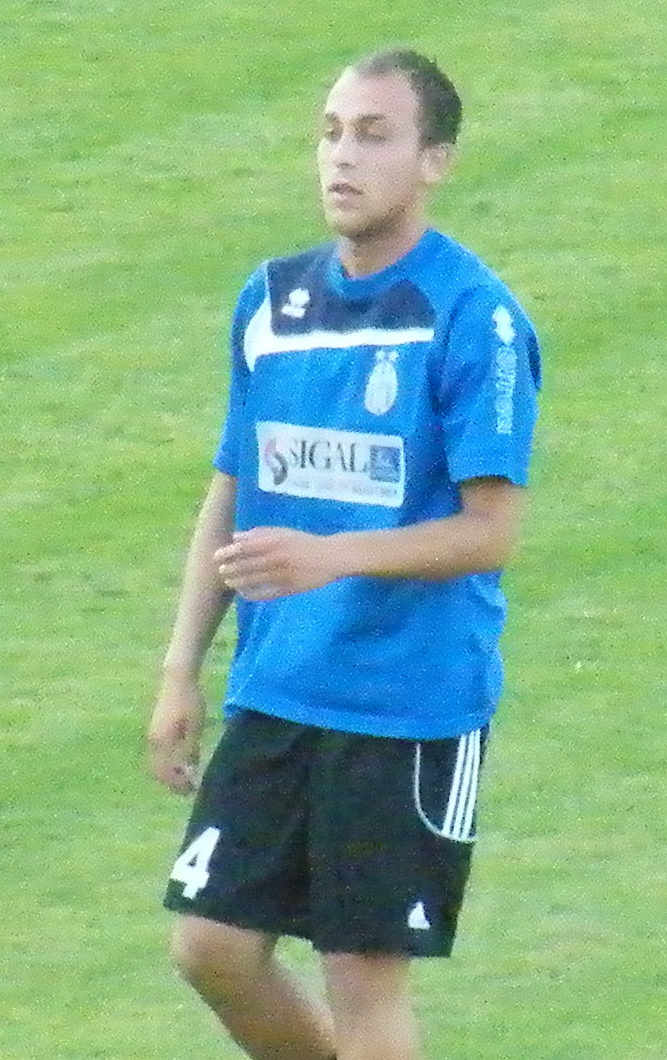

Personal information
- Full name: Gerald Tusha
- Date of birth: 5 February 1991 (age 35)
- Place of birth: Tirana, Albania
- Position: Left midfielder

Team information
- Current team: Vora

Youth career
- 2000–2008: Tirana

Senior career*
Years	Team	Apps	(Gls)
2008–2012	Tirana	32	(1)
2013	→ Partizani (loan)	13	(2)
2013–2014	Dinamo Tirana	22	(1)
2014–2015	Mamurrasi	23	(1)
2015–2016	Tërbuni	24	(1)
2016–2017	Xagħra United	2	(0)
2017–2018	Għajnsielem	?	(?)
2018–2019	Liria Prizren	2	(0)
2019–	Vora	4	(0)
- * Club domestic league appearances and goals as of 25 March 2019

Gerald Tusha (born 5 February 1991) is an Albanian professional footballer who plays as a left midfielder for KF Vora.

== Club career ==
Tusha made his league debut for Tirana on the opening day of the 2008–2009 season on 24 August 2008 during a match with Vllaznia Shkodër. The 17-year-old midfielder came on for Lek Kcira in the 55th minute of the game. During the 2008–09 season he made 2 league appearances, both of them coming on as a substitute. In total he played 54 minutes of Albanian Superliga football.

In August 2016, Tusha joined Xagħra United of Malta.

After two years in Malta, Tusha signed a one-year contract with Liria Prizren in Kosovo.

== Honours ==
=== Club ===
Tirana

- Albanian Superliga: 2008–09
- Albanian Cup: 2010–11, 2011–12
- Albanian Supercup: 2011, 2012
