= Erion =

- Gender: Male
- Language: Albanian

Origin
- Meaning: Our wind
- Region of origin: Albania, Kosovo

Other names
- Alternative spelling: Erjon

Erion is an Albanian male given name, which means "Ionian wind", as the wind from the Ionian Sea. A related name is Erjon. The name may refer to:

- Erion Braçe (born 1972), Albanian politician
- Erion Hoxhallari (born 1995), Albanian footballer
- Erion Sadiku (born 2002), Kosovan association footballer
- Erion Sula (born 1986), Albanian footballer
- Erion Veliaj (born 1979), Albanian politician
- Erion Xhafa (born 1982), Albanian footballer

== See also ==
- Mepacrine, an antimalarial drug sometimes called Erion
