= Gjata =

Gjata is an Albanian surname. Notable people with the surname include:

- Arvis Gjata (born 1987), Albanian football midfielder
- Elvana Gjata (born 1987), Albanian singer, songwriter and model
- Fatmir Gjata (1922–1989), Albanian writer
- Kadri Gjata (1865–1912), Albanian patriot, writer and educator
- Kreshnik Gjata (born 1983), Albanian swimmer
- Mario Gjata (born 2000), Albanian professional footballer
