= Florent Aziri =

German footballer

Personal information
- Date of birth: 3 September 1988 (age 38)
- Place of birth: Titova Mitrovica, SFR Yugoslavia
- Height: 1.70 m (5 ft 7 in)
- Position: Midfielder

Youth career
- Holstein Kiel
- 1999–2000: PSV Union Neumünster
- 2000–2002: SV Tungendorf
- 2002–2003: Werder Bremen
- 2003–2005: VfL Wolfsburg
- 2005–2007: Werder Bremen

Senior career*
Years	Team	Apps	(Gls)
2007–2008	FC Oberneuland	29	(4)
2008	VfB Lübeck	2	(0)
2008–2009	FC Oberneuland	12	(0)
2009–2011	Trepça	32	(3)
2011	→ NK Domžale (loan)	9	(0)
2012	Tirana	11	(1)
2012	Besa Kavajë	9	(0)
2014–2015	VfB Oldenburg	4	(0)
2015–2018	Bremer SV	67	(40)
2018–2019	BSC Hastedt	20	(6)
2019–2020	FC Oberneuland	9	(2)
2020–2021	SV Hemelingen	2	(0)
- * Club domestic league appearances and goals as of 09:21, 7 June 2021 (UTC)

Florent Aziri (born 3 September 1988) is a German-Albanian former professional footballer who last played for SV Hemelingen. He mainly operated as a wide midfielder, usually on the right, but he has also played in more advanced roles as a winger and striker.

== Career ==
Aziri was born in Titova Mitrovica, SFR Yugoslavia

=== KF Trepça ===
He played for his hometown club Trepça in the 2009–10 season.

=== KF Tirana ===
He signed for Albanian Superliga side KF Tirana in the closing hours of the January transfer window of 2012 as a free agent. He hoped the move to Albania's most successful club will help his chances of breaking into the Albania national team.

He scored on his debut with the club against Kastrioti Kruje in the Albanian Cup on 4 February, coming on as a substitute at half time for Nertil Ferraj. He played well on the left flank, causing many problems for the Kastrioti defenders with his dangerous crosses in the area, before eventually scoring in the dying minutes of the game to finish off an impressive debut in Albanian football.

=== Failed transfer Suwon Samsung Bluewings ===
In the beginning of December 2012, his manager announced that Aziri would sign a two-year-contract for the South Korean K-League club Suwon Samsung Bluewings. However, for unknown reasons the transfer failed.

== Honours ==
Trepça

- Kosovo Superleague: 2009–10

NK Domzale

- Slovenian Cup: 2010–11

Tirana

- Albanian Cup: 2011–12
