= Erjon Dushku =

Albanian footballer

Personal information
- Full name: Erjon Dushku
- Date of birth: 25 February 1985 (age 41)
- Place of birth: Lezhë, Albania
- Height: 1.87 m (6 ft 2 in)
- Position: Defender

Youth career
- –2005: KF Tirana

Senior career*
Years	Team	Apps	(Gls)
2005–2007	Kastrioti	20	(0)
2007–2010	Teuta	77	(4)
2010–2013	Tirana	67	(3)
2013–2014	Flamurtari	27	(1)
2014–2015	Kukësi	27	(5)

International career^{‡}
2001	Albania U17	2	(1)
2003–2004	Albania U19	6	(0)
2005–2006	Albania U21	4	(0)
- * Club domestic league appearances and goals as of 1 December 2014 ‡ National team caps and goals as of 25 August 2010

Erjon Dushku (born 25 February 1985) is an Albanian retired footballer who played in the Albanian Superliga as a central defender. He has represented Albania U17, U19 and U21.

== Club career ==
The Albanian media speculated in 2013 about an offer to Dushku from Kasımpaşa Spor Kulübü, a Turkish club that plays in the Süper Lig.

At the end of the 2014–15 season he left FK Kukësi after his one-year contract with the club had expired.

=== Clubs statistics ===
As of 8 July 2015

Club	Season	League		Kupa		Continental (Note: Including continental competitions, such as UEFA Champions League and UEFA Europa League)		Other (Note: Including other competitions, such as Albanian Supercup)		Total	
Club	Season	Apps	Goals	Apps	Goals	Apps	Goals	Apps	Goals	Apps	Goals
Kastrioti Krujë	2005–06	0	0	0	0	–	–	–	–	0	0
Kastrioti Krujë	2006–07	14	0	0	0	–	–	–	–	14	0
Kastrioti Krujë	Total	14	0	0	0	0	0	0	0	14	0
Teuta Durrës	2007–08	28	2	0	0	–	–	–	–	28	2
Teuta Durrës	2008–09	22	0	2	0	–	–	–	–	24	0
Teuta Durrës	2009–10	27	2	3	0	–	–	–	–	30	2
Teuta Durrës	Total	77	4	5	0	0	0	0	0	82	4
KF Tirana	2010–11	27	0	6	1	0	0	1	0	28	2
KF Tirana	2011–12	24	3	13	1	2	0	1	0	40	4
KF Tirana	2012–13	16	0	5	0	2	0	–	–	23	0
Flamurtari Vlorë	2013–14	27	1	3	0	–	–	–	–	30	1
FK Kukësi	2014–15	27	5	5	0	2	0	–	–	18	1
Total	67	3	24	2	4	0	2	0	97	5	
Career total		212	13	37	2	6	0	2	0	257	15

== International career ==
Dushku is a former youth player of Albania national team, collecting four appearances with Albania U21 during 2005–06.

== Honours ==
=== Clubs ===
KF Tirana

- Albanian Cup (2): 2010–11, 2011–12
- Albanian Supercup (2): 2011, 2012

Flamurtari Vlorë

- Albanian Cup (1): 2013–14
