= Julián Rubio =

Spanish footballer and manager

Personal information
- Full name: Julián Rubio Sánchez
- Date of birth: 28 January 1952 (age 74)
- Place of birth: Montealegre del Castillo, Spain
- Height: 1.72 m (5 ft 7 1/2 in)
- Position: Midfielder

Youth career
- Albacete

Senior career*
Years	Team	Apps	(Gls)
1968–1969	Albacete		
1969–1972	Ontinyent		
1972–1979	Sevilla	161	(24)
1979–1981	Barcelona	18	(1)
1981–1984	Albacete	47	(8)

Managerial career
- 1984–1985: Albacete
- 1987–1988: Maspalomas
- 1989: Albacete
- 1989: Recreativo
- 1990–1991: Ibiza
- 1992: Albacete
- 1994: Elche
- 1996–1997: Sevilla B
- 1997: Sevilla
- 1999–2001: Albacete
- 2001–2003: Elche
- 2003–2004: Poli Ejido
- 2004–2005: Ciudad Murcia
- 2006: Elche
- 2008: Cádiz
- 2009: Atlético Ciudad
- 2009–2010: Albacete
- 2011–2012: KF Tirana
- 2012: Flamurtari
- * Club domestic league appearances and goals

Julián Rubio Sánchez (born 28 January 1952) is a Spanish former football midfielder and manager.

He appeared in 134 La Liga matches over six seasons (14 goals), mainly in representation of Sevilla. His professional career was closely associated to Albacete Balompié, with which he played and worked in several capacities.

== Playing career ==
Born in Montealegre del Castillo, Province of Albacete, Rubio started playing for local club Albacete Balompié. He made his senior debut with Ontinyent CF, spending two of his three seasons in the Segunda División, then switched to Sevilla FC in the same league, promoting to La Liga in 1975.

Rubio made his debut in the top flight on 6 September 1975, playing the full 90 minutes in a 3–0 home win against UD Las Palmas, and finished his first year with 26 games (all starts) and three goals as the Andalusians ranked in 11th position. After three more seasons, always as first choice, he signed with FC Barcelona.

At the Camp Nou, having to compete with the likes of Juan Manuel Asensi and Jesús Landáburu – and later Bernd Schuster – Rubio was nothing but a fringe player due to a serious knee injury, all of his league appearances coming in the 1979–80 campaign. He returned to Albacete in the summer of 1981, promoting to Segunda División B in his first season and eventually retiring at the age of 32.

== Coaching career ==
Immediately after retiring, Rubio began coaching precisely with his last club, achieving promotiong to the third division in his first season but being immediately relegated. In 1987 he joined amateurs CD Maspalomas, returning to his previous employer after one season.

In 1991, after one-year spells with Recreativo de Huelva (second tier, relegation) and SD Ibiza (regional leagues), Rubio returned to Albacete once again, now as director of football. As Benito Floro joined Real Madrid in the summer of 1992 following Albacete's top-flight overachiements, he was named his successor, being dismissed at the 15th round and replaced by former Sevilla teammate Víctor Espárrago.

In late April 1999, following spells with three teams, including Sevilla FC in which he was one of three managers in 1996–97 and four the following season, Rubio returned for the fourth time as Albacete coach, replacing Luigi Maifredi late into the third-tier campaign and leading the Castilla–La Mancha side to the 15th position out of 22 teams. In the following seven years he worked in the same league, with Albacete, Elche CF (two spells), Polideportivo Ejido, Ciudad de Murcia and Cádiz CF; additionally, late into 1999–2000 with Albacete, he had to take a forced one-month break from coaching to undergo surgery due to a serious illness.

Rubio started the 2009–10 season at the helm of CF Atlético Ciudad in the third division, leaving the club – who would be eventually relegated due to financial irregularities– in late November. He was appointed at Albacete the following month in substitution of José Murcia, and both coaches and a third one, David Vidal, were in charge for 14 matches as they eventually retained their status.

On 21 June 2011, Rubio became the first Spaniard to coach in the Albanian Superliga, joining KF Tirana on a one-year contract. He helped the team to that season's Albanian Supercup, a 1–0 win over KF Skënderbeu Korçë, adding the Albanian Cup the following year against those rivals and defeating the same opposition in the 2012 Supercup.

On 7 June 2012, Rubio was due to extend his link with Tirana. Both parties failed to reach an agreement, however, and he eventually left for another club in the country, Flamurtari FC.

Rubio was relieved of his duties after only three months in charge, due to poor results.
