= Charles Ofoyen =

Nigerian footballer

Personal information
- Full name: Chukwuka Charles Ofoyen
- Date of birth: 26 July 1985 (age 41)
- Place of birth: Nigeria
- Position: Defender

Senior career*
Years	Team	Apps	(Gls)
2007–2011	Apolonia Fier	68	(2)
2008	→ Bilisht (loan)	14	(0)
2008	→ Albpetrol (loan)		
2012–2013	Tomori	32	(3)
2013–2015	Laçi	43	(2)
2015–2017	Sopoti Librazhd	4	(0)
2017–2018	Burreli	5	(1)
- * Club domestic league appearances and goals

Chukwuka Charles Ofoyen (born 26 July 1985) is a Nigerian former footballer who played as a defender.
