= Mensur Idrizi =

North Macedonian footballer (born 1983)

Personal information
- Date of birth: 3 August 1983 (age 43)
- Place of birth: Tetovo, SFR Yugoslavia
- Height: 1.83 m (6 ft 0 in)
- Position: Winger

Senior career*
Years	Team	Apps	(Gls)
2005–2007	Shkëndija	63	(11)
2007–2008	Rabotnički	7	(0)
2008	→ Shkëndija (loan)	6	(1)
2008–2009	Shkëndija		
2009	Vardar	12	(2)
2010	Shkëndija		
2010	Elbasani	15	(0)
2011	Skënderbeu	15	(0)
2011	Teteks	13	(0)
2012	Pogradeci	13	(0)
2012	Drita	17	(1)
2013–2014	Renova	43	(4)
2014–2015	Drita		
2015–2016	Teteks		
2016–2019	Ferizaj		
- * Club domestic league appearances and goals

Mensur Idrizi (Macedonian: Менсур Идризи; born 3 August 1983) is a North Macedonian former professional footballer who played as a winger. A journeyman, he played in Macedonia, Albania and Kosovo. Idrizi is of Albanian ethnicity.

== Honours ==
Skënderbeu Korçë

- Albanian Superliga: 2010–11
