= Rigers Hoxha =

Albanian footballer

Personal information
- Date of birth: 3 September 1985 (age 41)
- Place of birth: Krujë, Albania
- Position: Defender

Team information
- Current team: Iliria
- Number: 5

Senior career*
Years	Team	Apps	(Gls)
2004–2006	Dinamo Tirana	10	(0)
2006–2015	Kastrioti	160	(4)
2015–2016	Iliria	20	(1)
2016–2018	Kastrioti	45	(2)
2018-	Iliria	18	(0)
- * Club domestic league appearances and goals as of 12 December 2019

Rigers Hoxha (born 3 September 1985 in Krujë) is an Albanian professional footballer who plays for Iliria Fushë-Krujë in the Albanian First Division.

== Honours ==
Kastrioti Krujë

- Albanian Superliga Playoffs (2): 2009, 2010
