= Shaqir Stafa =

Albanian footballer (born 1987)

Personal information
- Full name: Shaqir Stafa
- Date of birth: 23 April 1987 (age 39)
- Place of birth: Durrës, Albania
- Height: 1.84 m (6 ft 0 in)
- Positions: Defender; midfielder

Youth career
- –2006: Teuta Durrës

Senior career*
Years	Team	Apps	(Gls)
2006–2015	Teuta	120	(0)
2012	→ Tomori (loan)	4	(0)
2013–2014	→ Besa (loan)	21	(0)
2014	→ Kastrioti (loan)	5	(0)
2015–2016	Erzeni	20	(0)

International career
2007–2008	Albania U-21	1	(0)
- * Club domestic league appearances and goals

Shaqir Stafa (born 23 April 1987) is an Albanian footballer who most recently played for Erzeni Shijak in the Albanian First Division.

== Club career ==
Stafa played the majority of his career for his hometown club Teuta, except for some loan spells and a stint at Kastrioti Krujë, whom he joined in the summer of 2014. On 21 July 2015, he left Teuta Durrës and signed with Albanian First Division side Erzeni Shijak.
