= Erion Sadiku =

Kosovan-Swedish footballer

Personal information
- Date of birth: 23 January 2002 (age 24)
- Place of birth: Sweden
- Height: 1.83 m (6 ft 0 in)
- Position: Midfielder

Team information
- Current team: Varbergs BoIS
- Number: 28

Youth career
- Trönninge BK
- –2017: Varbergs BoIS
- 2021–2022: Genoa

Senior career*
Years	Team	Apps	(Gls)
2017–2021	Varbergs BoIS	41	(2)
2022–2024	Örgryte	55	(2)
2024–	Varbergs BoIS	64	(2)
- * Club domestic league appearances and goals as of 11 November 2026 ‡ National team caps and goals as of 29 August 2020

Erion Sadiku (born 23 January 2002) is a Kosovan professional footballer who plays as a midfielder for Swedish club Varbergs BoIS.

== Club career ==
=== Varbergs BoIS ===
On 13 October 2017, Sadiku signed his first professional contract with Superettan side Varbergs BoIS after agreeing to a three-year deal. On 19 June 2018, he made his debut in a 3–3 home draw against Helsingborgs IF after coming on as a substitute at last minutes in place of Adama Fofana.

=== Genoa ===
On 1 February 2021, Sadiku signed a two-and-a-half-year contract with Campionato Primavera 1 club Genoa Youth Sector. His debut with Genoa Youth Sector came two days later in the 2020–21 Coppa Italia Primavera round of 16 against Parma Youth Sector after being named in the starting line-up.

=== Örgryte ===
On 1 August 2022, Sadiku signed a three-and-a-half-year contract with Superettan club Örgryte. Sadiku missed Örgryte's first matches of the league against AFC Eskilstuna and Örebro as the club could not register him and five days after the transfer, he was registered. His debut with Örgryte came on 13 August in a 1–2 away win against Dalkurd after being named in the starting line-up. Fourteen days after debut, Sadiku scored his first goal for Örgryte in his third appearance for the club in a 1–1 away draw over Västerås in Superettan.

== International career ==
On 29 August 2020, Sadiku received a call-up from Kosovo U21 for the 2021 UEFA European Under-21 Championship qualification match against England, he was an unused substitute in that match.

== Career statistics ==
=== Club ===
As of 1 August 2022

Club	Season	League			Cup		Other		Total	
Club	Season	Division	Apps	Goals	Apps	Goals	Apps	Goals	Apps	Goals
Varbergs BoIS	2018	Superettan	7	0	0	0	1 (Note: Appearance(s) in Superettan playoffs)	0	8	0
Varbergs BoIS	2019	Superettan	10	0	0	0	—		10	0
Varbergs BoIS	2020	Allsvenskan	24	2	2	0	—		24	2
Varbergs BoIS	Total		41	2	2	0	1	0	44	2
Örgryte	2022	Superettan	3	1	0	0	—		3	1
Career total			40	3	2	0	1	0	47	3
