= Olalekan Bola =

Nigerian footballer

Personal information
- Full name: Olalekan Akinde Bola
- Date of birth: February 10, 1992 (age 34)
- Place of birth: Lagos, Nigeria
- Height: 1.86 m (6 ft 1 in)
- Position: Striker

Youth career
- 2006–2007: Oke Ado United

Senior career*
Years	Team	Apps	(Gls)
2008–2011	Ocean Boys F.C.	18	(1)
2012–2013	Bylis Ballsh	24	(0)
2013–2015	Enugu Rangers	69	(17)
- * Club domestic league appearances and goals

Olalekan Akinde Bola(born 10 February 1992) is a Nigerian former footballer. He started his senior career at Ocean Boys FC.

== Career ==
Bola began his career with the University of Lagos and moved to the Ocean Boys F.C. in the year 2008, where he won the Nigerian FA Cup in his first season.

== Honours ==
- 2008: Nigerian FA Cup Champion
