= Emilian Lundraxhiu =

Albanian footballer

Personal information
- Date of birth: 9 May 1994 (age 32)
- Place of birth: Peqin, Albania
- Position: Centre-back

Team information
- Current team: ESC Geestemünde

Senior career*
Years	Team	Apps	(Gls)
2010–2016	Shkumbini	65	(3)
2013	→ Gramshi (loan)	3	(0)
2013	→ Tomori (loan)	13	(0)
2016	Erzeni	11	(0)
2017	Vatan Sport	18	(2)
2018	Bremer SV	8	(0)
2018	Erzeni		
2019–2020	OSC Bremerhaven	4	(0)
2020	KF Lushnja		
2020	BV Essen		
2020	Vatan Sport	6	(2)
2021	Shkumbini		
2021–2023	1.FC RW Achim		
2023–2024	TSV Etelsen	25	(2)
2024–	ESC Geestemünde	0	(0)

International career
2013	Albania U19	2	(0)
- * Club domestic league appearances and goals as of 31 May 2024

Emilian Lundraxhiu (born 9 May 1994) is an Albanian footballer who plays as a centre-back for German club ESC Geestemünde.

== Club career ==
Lundraxhiu played for several Albanian clubs including Erzeni Shijak. He joined Bremer SV from Vatan Sport in January 2018.
