= Arvis Gjata =

Albanian footballer

Personal information
- Date of birth: 23 June 1987 (age 39)
- Place of birth: Peqin, Albania
- Position: Midfielder

Senior career*
Years	Team	Apps	(Gls)
2005–2009	Shkumbini	45	(2)
2009–2010	Skënderbeu	2	(0)
2010–2011	Shkumbini	18	(2)
2011–2012	Tirana	4	(0)
2012–2014	Shkumbini	40	(4)
2014–2015	Tomori	4	(0)
2015–2016	Shkumbini	38	(5)
2016–2018	Dinamo Tirana	41	(2)
- * Club domestic league appearances and goals

Arvis Gjata (born 23 June 1987) is an Albanian former footballer who played as a midfielder.

== Career ==
=== KF Tirana ===
He signed for KF Tirana along with fellow Shkumbini Peqin player Xhino Sejdo on 26 January 2012, on an 18-month contract worth 100,000 lek a month (around €715 at the time).

== Career stats ==
Club performance			League		Cup		Continental		Total	
Season	Club	League	Apps	Goals	Apps	Goals	Apps	Goals	Apps	Goals
Albania			League		Albanian Cup		Europe		Total	
2008–09	Shkumbini Peqin	Albanian Superliga	18	2	4	0	0	0	22	2
2009–10	Shkumbini Peqin	Albanian Superliga	2	0	0	0	0	0	2	0
2009–10	Skënderbeu Korçë	Albanian Superliga	2	0	0	0	0	0	2	0
2010–11	Shkumbini Peqin	Albanian Superliga	7	1	0	0	0	0	7	1
2011–12	Shkumbini Peqin	Albanian Superliga	11	1	4	0	0	0	15	1
2011–12	KF Tirana	Albanian Superliga	4	0	4	0	0	0	8	0
