= Erjon Mustafaj =

Albanian footballer

Personal information
- Full name: Erjon Mustafaj
- Date of birth: 29 January 1989 (age 37)
- Place of birth: Peqin, Albania
- Height: 1.79 m (5 ft 10 in)
- Position: Midfielder

Team information
- Current team: Egnatia
- Number: 10

Youth career
- 2002–2005: Shkumbini

Senior career*
Years	Team	Apps	(Gls)
2005–2013	Shkumbini	150	(30)
2013–2013	Teuta	11	(1)
2014	Shkumbini	10	(2)
2014–2015	Butrinti	20	(3)
2015	Elbasani	6	(2)
2016–2019	Shkumbini	55	(14)
2020–	Egnatia	9	(0)
- * Club domestic league appearances and goals

Erjon Mustafaj (born 29 January 1989 in Peqin) is an Albanian footballer who plays as a midfielder for KF Egnatia in the Albanian First Division.

== Honours ==
=== Individual ===
- Albanian Superliga Player of the Month (1): October 2010
