= 2007–08 Kategoria Superiore =

Kategoria Superiore
- Season: 2007–08
- Dates: 25 August 2007 – 17 May 2008
- Champions: Dinamo; 17th Albanian title
- Relegated: Kastrioti (via play-off); Skënderbeu; Besëlidhja
- Champions League: Dinamo
- UEFA Cup: Partizani; Vllaznia
- Intertoto Cup: Besa
- Matches: 198
- Goals: 463 (2.34 per match)
- Top goalscorer: Vioresin Sinani (20 goals)

The 2007–08 Kategoria Superiore was the 72nd season of top-tier football in Albania and the tenth season under the name Kategoria Superiore. The season began on 25 August 2007 and ended on 17 May 2008. KF Tirana were the defending champions, having won their twenty-third title the previous season.

== Teams ==
=== Stadia and last season ===
Locations of the 2007–08 Kategoria Superiore teams

Team	Location	Stadium	Capacity	Last season
Besa	Kavajë	Besa Stadium	8,000	6th
Besëlidhja	Lezhë	Brian Filipi Stadium	5,000	Kategoria e Parë
Dinamo Tirana	Tirana	Qemal Stafa Stadium (Note: Dinamo Tirana, Partizani and Tirana all shared the Qemal Stafa Stadium as well as the Selman Stërmasi Stadium.)	19,700	5th
Elbasani	Elbasan	Ruzhdi Bizhuta Stadium	15,000	7th
Flamurtari	Vlorë	Flamurtari Stadium	15,000	9th
Partizani	Tirana	Qemal Stafa Stadium	19,700	4th
Skënderbeu	Korçë	Skënderbeu Stadium	12,000	Kategoria e Parë
Shkumbini	Peqin	Shkumbini Stadium	6,000	10th
Kastrioti	Krujë	Kastrioti Stadium	3,500	8th
Teuta	Durrës	Niko Dovana Stadium	12,040	2nd
Tirana	Tirana	Qemal Stafa Stadium	19,700	Champions
Vllaznia	Shkodër	Loro Boriçi Stadium	15,000	3rd

== League table ==
Pos	Team	Pld	W	D	L	GF	GA	GD	Pts	Qualification or relegation
1	Dinamo Tirana (C)	33	21	7	5	56	14	+42	70	Qualification for the Champions League first qualifying round
2	Partizani	33	18	11	4	47	22	+25	65	Qualification for the UEFA Cup first qualifying round
3	Besa	33	17	5	11	45	36	+9	56	Qualification for the Intertoto Cup first round
4	Elbasani	33	13	13	7	40	24	+16	52	
5	Shkumbini	33	14	8	11	35	28	+7	50	
6	Tirana	33	14	7	12	46	36	+10	49	
7	Vllaznia	33	12	9	12	46	46	0	45	Qualification for the UEFA Cup first qualifying round (Note: Vllaznia qualified for the UEFA Cup first qualifying round by winning the 2007–08 Albanian Cup.)
8	Flamurtari	33	10	14	9	35	37	−2	44	
9	Teuta (O)	33	9	8	16	32	45	−13	35	Qualification for the relegation play-offs
10	Kastrioti (R)	33	10	5	18	24	43	−19	35	Qualification for the relegation play-offs
11	Besëlidhja (R)	33	9	7	17	31	52	−21	34	Relegation to the 2008–09 Kategoria e Parë
12	Skënderbeu (R)	33	3	2	28	26	80	−54	11	Relegation to the 2008–09 Kategoria e Parë

Source: Albanian Football Association (in Albanian), Soccerway
Rules for classification: 1) points; 2) points in head-to-head matches; 3) goal difference in head-to-head matches; 4) goals scored in head-to-head matches; 5) total goal difference; 6) total goals scored; 7) draw
(C) Champions; (O) Play-off winners; (R) Relegated

== Results ==
The schedule consisted of three rounds. During the first two rounds, each team played each other once home and away for a total of 22 matches. The pairings of the third round were then set according to the standings after the first two rounds, giving every team a third game against each opponent for a total of 33 games per team.

=== First and second round ===
Home \ Away	BES	BSL	DIN	ELB	FLA	KAS	PAR	SKË	SKU	TEU	TIR	VLL
Besa		2–0	0–2	1–0	2–0	3–1	2–1	2–0	1–0	0–1	3–1	1–0
Besëlidhja	2–2		0–2	0–1	2–2	1–2	1–2	4–2	2–1	0–0	0–2	2–2
Dinamo	0–0	4–0		0–0	0–1	4–0	2–0	7–0	1–0	2–1	0–2	0–0
Elbasani	2–0	1–2	0–0		2–2	2–0	0–0	3–0	0–0	1–0	1–0	0–0
Flamurtari	1–0	1–1	1–2	0–1		1–0	0–0	3–1	0–0	2–2	1–0	2–2
Kastrioti	2–1	2–1	0–3	2–0	0–1		0–1	1–0	0–0	1–0	0–3	3–1
Partizani	3–3	4–0	1–0	0–0	0–0	2–1		4–0	2–1	4–0	0–0	1–0
Skënderbeu	1–1	0–2	1–2	0–1	1–1	2–0	1–2		1–2	1–3	4–2	2–3
Shkumbini	2–0	2–1	0–0	1–0	0–0	1–0	1–1	3–1		2–0	0–2	4–0
Teuta	0–1	2–0	0–1	0–1	3–2	2–0	1–1	0–2	1–1		0–0	0–3
Tirana	2–0	0–1	0–0	2–2	2–0	0–0	1–4	3–2	2–0	2–1		0–0
Vllaznia	1–1	3–0	0–1	2–1	1–1	3–1	1–1	2–0	3–1	2–0	4–1	

Source: Albanian Football Association
Legend: Blue = home team win; Yellow = draw; Red = away team win.

=== Third round ===
Home \ Away	BES	BSL	DIN	ELB	FLA	KAS	PAR	SKË	SKU	TEU	TIR	VLL
Besa		2–0				1–0	0–1	1–0	3–0		2–1	
Besëlidhja			1–0			1–1			0–2		1–0	4–2
Dinamo	2–0			3–1	6–0		2–1	3–1		2–1		
Elbasani	3–1	3–0				5–2	0–0	4–0	1–0	1–1		
Flamurtari	2–1	1–0		2–2		1–0	3–0					
Kastrioti			1–0						1–0	0–0	1–2	0–1
Partizani		1–0				0–0		2–0	2–0		2–1	2–0
Skënderbeu		0–2			1–4	0–2			1–3	0–2		
Shkumbini			0–0		1–0					3–0	1–0	3–2
Teuta	3–5	2–0			1–1		1–2					
Tirana			1–2	2–1	1–0			4–0		1–2		5–1
Vllaznia	2–3		0–3	0–0	2–0			2–1		1–2		

Source: Albanian Football Association
Legend: Blue = home team win; Yellow = draw; Red = away team win.

== Relegation playoffs ==
24 May 2008
15:00

Burreli	1–2 (a.e.t.)	Teuta
Xhixha 90'	Report	Dushku 7'; Hodo 114' (pen.)

Qemal Stafa Stadium, Tirana

25 May 2008
15:00

Kastrioti	0–0 (a.e.t.)	Lushnja
	Report
Penalties
	2–4

Qemal Stafa Stadium, Tirana

== Season statistics ==
=== Top scorers ===
Rank	Player	Club	Goals
1	(Albania) Vioresin Sinani	Vllaznia	20
2	(Croatia) Pero Pejić	Dinamo	18
3	(Albania) Klodian Duro	Tirana	16
4	(Albania) Skerdi Bejzade	Elbasani	13
5	(Albania) Elis Bakaj	Partizani	12
5	(Albania) Marius Ngjela	Skënderbeu/ Besëlidhja	12
7	(Albania) Parid Xhihani	Besa	11
8	(Albania) Xhevahir Sukaj	Vllaznia	10
8	(Albania) Gjergji Muzaka	Partizani	10
8	(Albania) Bledar Mançaku	Besa	10
8	(Albania) Erjon Rizvanolli	Kastrioti	10
