= 2012 Albanian Supercup =

- Event: Albanian Supercup
KF Tirana	Skënderbeu Korçë
2	1
- Date: 19 August 2012
- Venue: Qemal Stafa Stadium, Tirana
- Referee: Enea Jorgji
- Attendance: 4,000
- Weather: Dry

The 2012 Albanian Supercup is the 19th edition of the Albanian Supercup since its establishment in 1989. The match was contested between the 2011–12 Albanian Cup winners KF Tirana and the 2011–12 Albanian Superliga champions Skënderbeu Korçë.

This was a rematch of the previous year's Supercup, which Tirana won 1-0. Tirana won the 2012 meeting as well, this time 2-1.

== Details ==
19 August 2012
20:00 CET

Tirana	2–1	Skënderbeu Korçë
Taku 40'; Radaš 90' (o.g.)	Report	Plaku 51'

Qemal Stafa Stadium, Tirana
Attendance: 4,000
Referee: Enea Jorgji

== See also ==
- 2011–12 Albanian Superliga
- 2011–12 Albanian Cup
