= 2011–12 Albanian Cup =

Kupa e Shqipërisë

Tournament details
- Country: Albania

Final positions
- Champions: Tirana
- Runners-up: Skënderbeu

2011–12 Albanian Cup (Albanian: Kupa e Shqipërisë) was the sixtieth season of Albania's annual cup competition. The winners of the competition qualified for the first qualifying round of the 2012–13 UEFA Europa League. KF Tirana are the defending champions, having won their 14th Albanian Cup last season.

Except of Second Round and Quarter Finals, the rest of stages were played in a two-legged format similar to those of European competitions. If the aggregated score was tied after both games, the team with the higher number of away goals advanced. If the number of away goals was equal in both games, the match was decided by extra time and a penalty shootout, if necessary.

== Preliminary Tournament ==
In order to reduce the number of participating teams for the First Round to 32, a preliminary tournament was played. Only teams from the Second Division (third level) were allowed to enter. Each Second Division group played its own tournament. In contrast to the main tournament, the preliminary tournament was held as a single-leg knock-out competition.

=== First Preliminary Round ===
These matches took place on 6 September 2011.

Team 1	Score	Team 2
Partizani	0–3	Sukthi
Tërbuni	0–0 (a.e.t.) (3–0 p)	Luzi 2008
Bilisht Sport	3–0	Përmeti
Domozdova	3–0	Tepelena

=== Second Preliminary Round ===
These matches took place on 13 September 2011.

Team 1	Score	Team 2
Tërbuni	2–0	Sukthi
Bilisht Sport	2–1	Domozdova

== First round ==
All 30 teams of the 2011–12 Superliga and First Division entered in this round along with the two qualifiers from the Second Preliminary Round. The first legs were played on 21 September 2011 and the second legs took place on 27 September 2011.

Team 1	Agg.	Team 2	1st leg	2nd leg
Adriatiku	2–3	Elbasani	1–0	1–3
Gramozi	2–8	Apolonia	1–5	1–3
Luftëtari	1–0	Tomori	1–0	0–0
Vlora	0–6	Dinamo Tirana	0–3	0–3
Përparimi	2–4	Teuta	1–1	1–3
Iliria	2–7	Bylis	1–6	1–1
Skrapari	2–11	Laçi	0–3	2–8
Bilisht Sport	1–15	Flamurtari	1–4	0–11
Besëlidhja	0–4	Besa	0–2	0–2
Lushnja	2–2 (a)	Kamza	2–1	0–1
Ada	1–4	Pogradeci	1–2	0–2
Burreli	2–8	Shkumbini	2–1	0–7
Gramshi	2–4	Kastrioti	1–2	1–2
Himara	1–10	Tirana	0–3	1–7
Butrinti	2–5	Vllaznia	2–3	0–2
Tërbuni	1–5	Skënderbeu	1–2	0–3

== Second round ==
In a change from last year's format, this stage of the competition will be played as a group stage. The 16 winners from the First Round will be placed in 4 groups of 4 teams each. Each group will play a double round robin schedule for a total of 6 games for each team. The top 2 teams in each groups will move on to the next round of the competition. These matches took place between 18 October and 20 December 2011.

=== Group A ===
Pos	Team	Pld	W	D	L	GF	GA	GD	Pts	Qualification	TIR	LAÇ	APO	SHK
1	Tirana	6	6	0	0	13	4	+9	18	Advance to quarter-finals		1–0	3–0	3–1
2	Laçi	6	2	2	2	7	5	+2	8	Advance to quarter-finals	0–1		0–0	3–1
3	Apolonia	6	2	1	3	11	13	−2	7		1–2	1–3		5–2
4	Shkumbini	6	0	1	5	10	19	−9	1		2–3	1–1	3–4	

Legend: Blue = home team win; Yellow = draw; Red = away team win.
Rules for classification: 1) points; 2) goal difference; 3) number of goals scored.

=== Group B ===
Pos	Team	Pld	W	D	L	GF	GA	GD	Pts	Qualification	FLA	KAM	TEU	POG
1	Flamurtari	6	3	1	2	6	3	+3	10	Advance to quarter-finals		0–0	1–0	3–0
2	Kamza	6	2	3	1	9	4	+5	9	Advance to quarter-finals	1–0		0–0	6–0
3	Teuta	6	2	3	1	4	2	+2	9		1–0	1–1		0–0
4	Pogradeci	6	1	1	4	4	14	−10	4		1–2	3–1	0–2	

Legend: Blue = home team win; Yellow = draw; Red = away team win.
Rules for classification: 1) points; 2) goal difference; 3) number of goals scored.

=== Group C ===
Pos	Team	Pld	W	D	L	GF	GA	GD	Pts	Qualification	KAS	SKË	LUF	BES
1	Kastrioti	6	4	1	1	15	8	+7	13	Advance to quarter-finals		3–1	4–1	2–0
2	Skënderbeu	6	4	0	2	10	7	+3	12	Advance to quarter-finals	2–0		2–0	3–0
3	Luftëtari	6	2	1	3	9	12	−3	7		3–3	4–1		1–0
4	Besa	6	1	0	5	3	10	−7	3		1–3	0–1	2–0	

Legend: Blue = home team win; Yellow = draw; Red = away team win.
Rules for classification: 1) points; 2) goal difference; 3) number of goals scored.

=== Group D ===
Pos	Team	Pld	W	D	L	GF	GA	GD	Pts	Qualification	VLL	BYL	ELB	DIN
1	Vllaznia	6	5	1	0	19	7	+12	16	Advance to quarter-finals		0–0	3–1	5–2
2	Bylis	6	4	1	1	13	8	+5	13	Advance to quarter-finals	2–4		4–1	2–1
3	Elbasani	6	1	0	5	7	16	−9	3		2–4	1–3		0–1
4	Dinamo Tirana	6	1	0	5	6	14	−8	3		0–3	1–2	1–2	

Legend: Blue = home team win; Yellow = draw; Red = away team win.
Rules for classification: 1) points; 2) goal difference; 3) number of goals scored.

== Quarter-finals ==
The 8 winners from the Second Round will be placed in 2 groups of 4 teams each. Each group will play a double round robin schedule for a total of 6 games for each team. The top 2 teams in each groups will move on to the next round of the competition. These matches took place between 28 January and 20 March 2012.

=== Group 1 ===
Pos	Team	Pld	W	D	L	GF	GA	GD	Pts	Qualification	TIR	KAS	BYL	KAM
1	Tirana	6	3	2	1	8	4	+4	11	Advance to semi-finals		2–0	1–1	2–0
2	Kastrioti	6	3	1	2	9	9	0	10	Advance to semi-finals	2–1		4–2	0–0
3	Bylis	6	2	3	1	11	7	+4	9		0–0	3–1		5–1
4	Kamza	6	0	2	4	3	11	−8	2		1–2	1–2	0–0	

Legend: Blue = home team win; Yellow = draw; Red = away team win.
Rules for classification: 1) points; 2) goal difference; 3) number of goals scored.

=== Group 2 ===
Pos	Team	Pld	W	D	L	GF	GA	GD	Pts	Qualification	FLA	SKË	VLL	LAÇ
1	Flamurtari	6	3	2	1	8	5	+3	11	Advance to semi-finals		3–0	2–0	1–1
2	Skënderbeu	6	3	2	1	8	6	+2	11	Advance to semi-finals	4–1		1–1	1–0
3	Vllaznia	6	1	2	3	3	5	−2	5		0–1	0–0		2–0
4	Laçi	6	1	2	3	3	6	−3	5		0–0	1–2	1–0	

Legend: Blue = home team win; Yellow = draw; Red = away team win.
Rules for classification: 1) points; 2) goal difference; 3) number of goals scored.

== Semi-finals ==
The four winners from the Quarterfinals will compete in this round. These matches took place on 4 and 18 April 2012.

Team 1	Agg.	Team 2	1st leg	2nd leg
Skënderbeu	3–1	Kastrioti	3–1	0–0
Flamurtari	2–5	Tirana	0–3	2–2

4 April 2012	Skënderbeu	3–1	Kastrioti	Skënderbeu Stadium, Korçë
18:00 CEST	Plaku 8'; Radaš 17'; Bratić 52'		Inkango 9'

18 April 2012	Kastrioti	0–0	Skënderbeu	Kastrioti Stadium, Krujë
15:30 CEST

Skënderbeu advanced to the final.

4 April 2012	Flamurtari	0–3	Tirana	Flamurtari Stadium, Vlorë
16:00 CEST			Dushku 4'; Cikalleshi 69'; Tusha 90+3'

18 April 2012	Tirana	2–2	Flamurtari	Qemal Stafa Stadium, Tirana
15:30 CEST	Cikalleshi 6'; Ferraj 29'		Pejić 21'; Pezo 78'

Tirana advanced to the final.

== Final ==
The two winners from the Semifinals will compete in this round. The final match took place on 17 May 2012 at Qemal Stafa Stadium in Tirana.

17 May 2012
20:00 UTC+2

Skënderbeu	0−1 (a.e.t.)	Tirana
	Report	Balaj 107'

Qemal Stafa Stadium, Tirana
Attendance: 5,000
Referee: Lorenc Jemini
