= 2011 Albanian Supercup =

2012 Albanian Supercup
- Event: Albanian Supercup
Skënderbeu Korçë	KF Tirana
0	1
- Date: August 18, 2011
- Venue: Skënderbeu Stadium, Korçë
- Referee: Enea Jorgji
- Attendance: 7000

The 2011 Albanian Supercup is the 18th edition of the Albanian Supercup since its establishment in 1989. The match was contested between the 2010–11 Albanian Superliga champions Skënderbeu Korçë and the 2010–11 Albanian Cup winners KF Tirana. The match was played on 18 August 2011.

After 17 editions played in Qemal Stafa Stadium, Tirane, this time the venue for the final was the Skënderbeu Stadium hosting its first Albanian Supercup final.

== Match details ==
18 August 2011
20:00 CET

Skënderbeu Korçë	0–1	KF Tirana
		Bekim Balaj 63'

Skënderbeu Stadium, Korçë
Attendance: 7000
Referee: Enea Jorgji
Lulëzim Koka
Ridiger Çokaj
Erion Sina

Skënderbeu Korçë	KF Tirana

== See also ==
- 2010–11 Albanian Superliga
- 2010–11 Albanian Cup
