= Salvatore D'Ancora =

Italian footballer

Personal information
- Date of birth: 6 May 1995 (age 31)
- Place of birth: Salerno, Italy
- Height: 1.79 m (5 ft 10 in)
- Position: Midfielder

Team information
- Current team: Avezzano
- Number: 44

Youth career
- –2013: Catania
- 2013–2014: Juve Stabia

Senior career*
Years	Team	Apps	(Gls)
2014	Juve Stabia	6	(0)
2014–2015	Bisceglie	18	(3)
2015–2017	Cavese	36	(3)
2017–2018	Bisceglie	20	(0)
2018–2019	Savoia	24	(2)
2019–2020	Brindisi	23	(5)
2020–2021	Savoia	32	(3)
2021	Bitonto	21	(5)
2021–2022	Casale	34	(5)
2022–2023	Puteolana	17	(3)
2023–2024	Chieti	8	(0)
2024–	Avezzano	0	(0)
- * Club domestic league appearances and goals as of 13 November 2024

Salvatore D'Ancora (born 6 May 1995) is an Italian football player who plays for Serie D club Avezzano.

== Club career ==
He made his Serie B debut for Juve Stabia on 3 May 2014 in a game against Latina.
