= Pagliani =

Pagliani is a surname. Notable people with the surname include:

- Manuel Pagliani (born 1996), Italian motorcycle racer
- Pericle Pagliani (1886–1932), Italian long-distance runner

== See also ==
- Pagliani Vittoria, a single-seat glider built in Italy during Second World War
- Pagliarini
