= Velletri =

- Comune
- Comune di Velletri
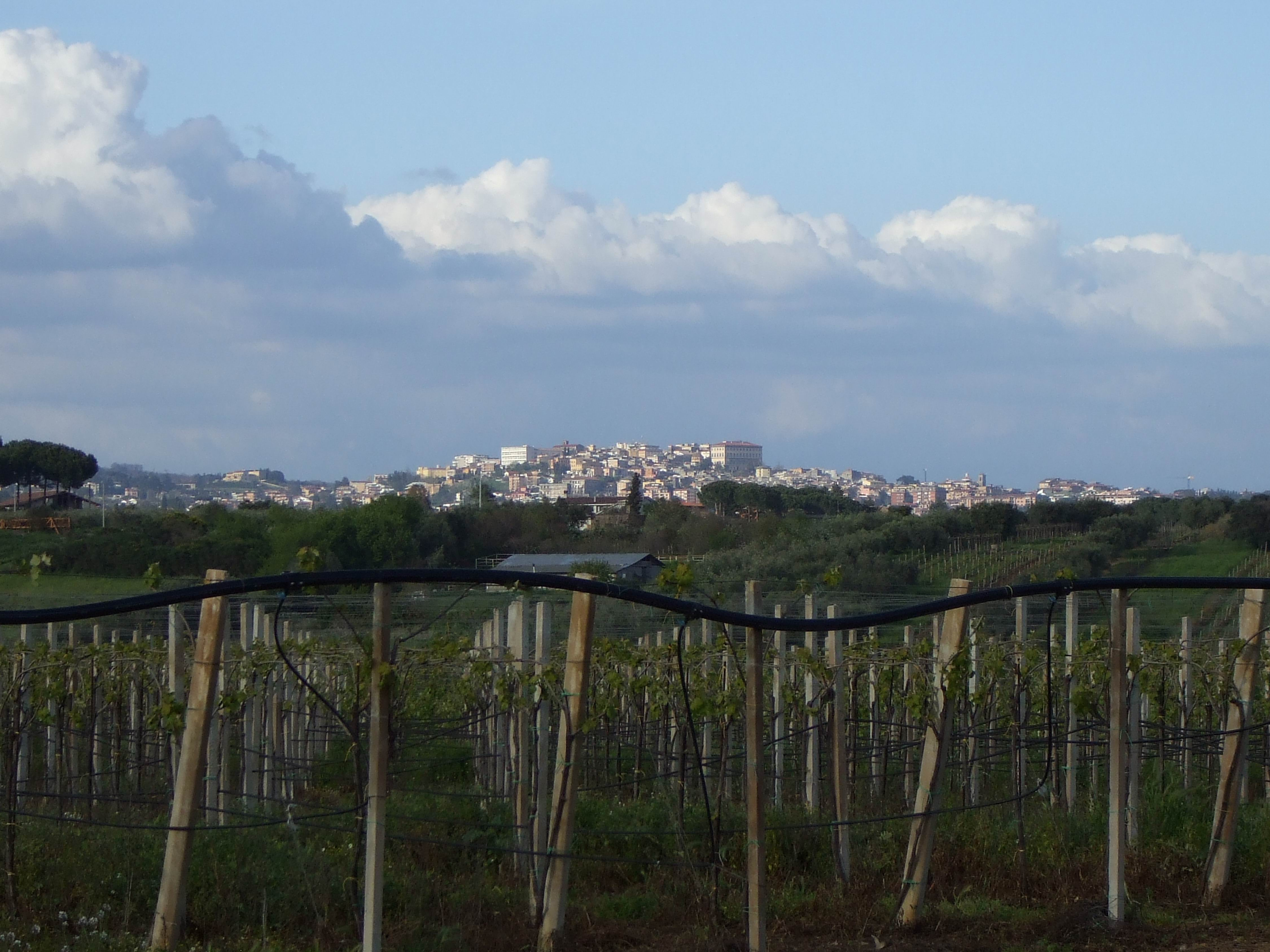
- Panorama of Velletri

- Coat of arms

- Velletri within the Metropolitan City of Rome

- Location within Italy Location within Lazio
- Coordinates: 41°41′12″N 12°46′39″E
- Country: Italy
- Region: Lazio
- Metropolitan city: Rome (RM)

Government
  - Mayor: Ascanio Cascella (Fdl)

Area
  - Total: 113 km^{2} (44 sq mi)
- Elevation: 380 m (1,250 ft)

Population (31 May 2021)
  - Total: 52,911
  - Density: 468/km^{2} (1,210/sq mi)
- Demonym: Veliterni
- Time zone: UTC+1 (CET)
  - Summer (DST): UTC+2 (CEST)
- Postal code: 00049
- Dialing code: 06
- Patron saint: Saint Clement
- Saint day: November 23
- Website: Official website

Velletri (Italian: [velˈleːtri]; Latin: Velitrae; Volscian: Velester) is an Italian comune in the Metropolitan City of Rome, approximately 40 km to the southeast of the city centre, located in the Alban Hills, in the region of Lazio, central Italy. Neighbouring communes are Rocca di Papa, Lariano, Cisterna di Latina, Artena, Aprilia, Nemi, Genzano di Roma, and Lanuvio. Its motto is: Est mihi libertas papalis et imperialis ('Liberty of pope and empire is given to me').

Velletri was an ancient city of the Volsci tribe. Legendarily it came into conflict with the Romans during the reign of Ancus Marcius, the fourth king of Rome; then again in the fifth and fourth centuries BCE, during the early Roman Republic. Velletri was also the home of the Octavii, the paternal family of the first Roman Emperor Augustus. In the Middle Ages, it was one of the few "free cities" in Lazio and central Italy. It was the site of two historic battles in 1744 and 1849. During the Second World War, it was at the centre of fierce fighting between the Germans and the allies in 1944 after the Anglo-American landing at Anzio.

Today, Velletri is home to a circuit court and a prison, in addition to several colleges and high schools. It is the terminus of the Rome-Velletri railway, inaugurated by Pius IX in 1863, and is one of the centers the Via Appia Nuova (modern Appian Way) passes through.

== Physical geography ==
=== Territory ===
The territory of Velletri stretches between two distinct areas. The northern part is situated on the southern foothills of the Colli Albani range and was geologically formed about 150,000 years ago, after the collapse of the Volcano Laziale (caldera). On the other hand, the southern boundary forms around Pontine Marshes, whose reclamation started at the time of Pope Pius VI and was accomplished during the regime of Benito Mussolini.

According to the classification given by the Geological Survey of Italy, much of the territory consists of ground-type LPS, or paleosols, the rest is mainly composed of soils lp, lapilli, argillificate, Mafic, and leucite analcimizzata.

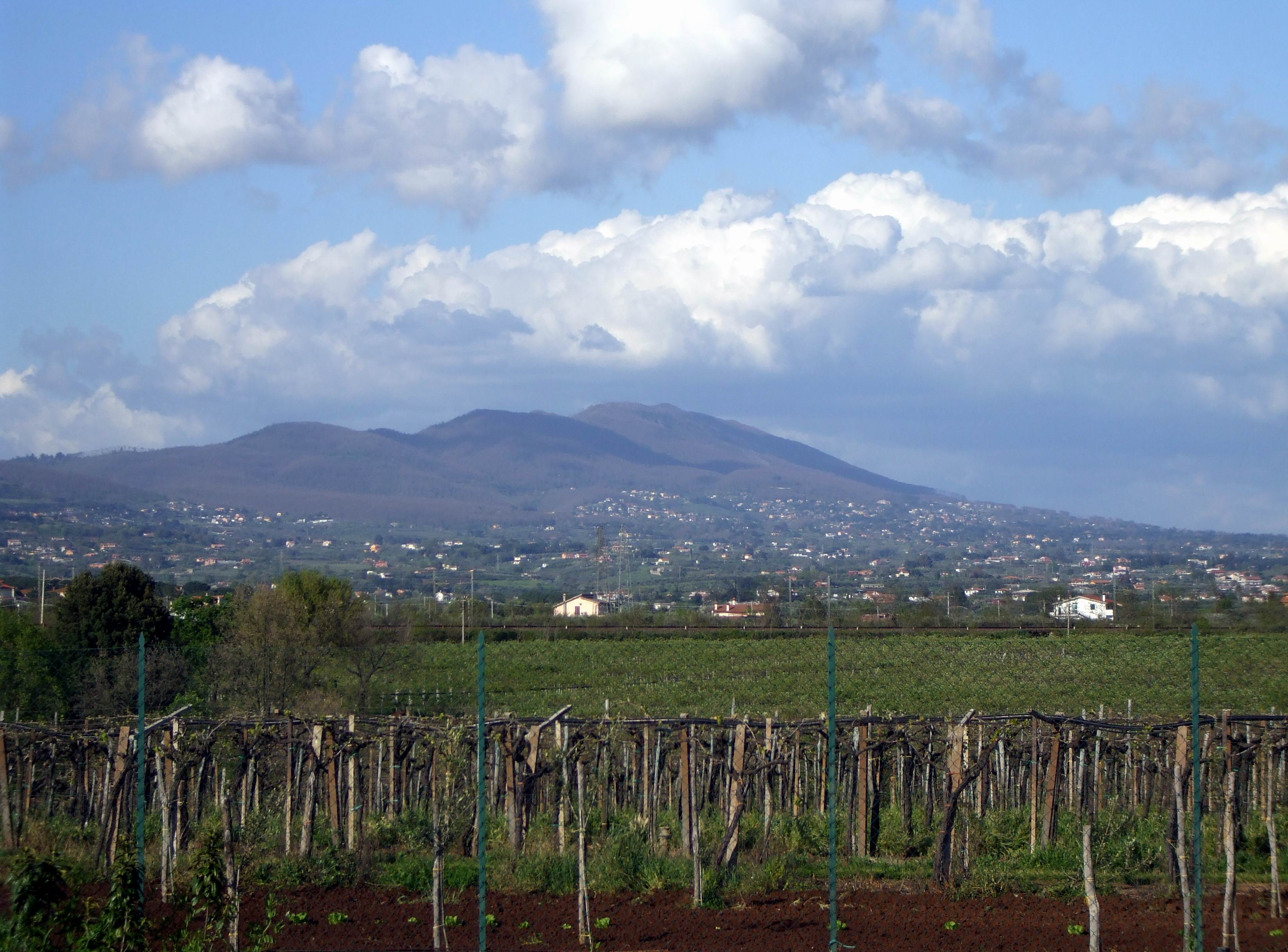
Mount Artemisio overshadows Velletri

The Seismic classification of Velletri's territory is Zone 2 (medium-high seismicity).

=== Hydrography ===
The territory of Velletri collects water run off from many streams. These streams, most of them torrential in character or small in scale, are known as fossi. Main fossi include:

- Fosso Minella at the edge of the municipal area to Genzano di Roma, near the Velletri frazione of Sant'Eurosia. This stream originates from Monte Spina, elevation 731 metres (2,398 ft) above sea level, in the territory of Nemi, with the name of Acqua Lucia. It is named after the Minella bridge on State Road 7, Via Appia Nuova and originates at 405 metres (1,329 ft) above sea level, at the foot of Colle degli Olmi. Minella also runs parallel to the fosso delle Tre Armi, which then connects to it.
- Fossa Sant'Eurosia, originating from Colle degli Olmi; it goes through the village of the same name, located at 238 metres (781 ft) above sea level.
- Fossa Paganica, which originates from springs on Colle Caldaro (467 m), and on Colle Tondo (596 m).
- Fosso di Ponte Veloce, which arises from Colle Tondo, on Maschio dell'Artemisio (812 m) and in the Faccialone forest (615 m). This watercourse near Villa Borgia, superseded the old town of Velletri, changes name to Fossa Farina near the iron bridge of the Roma-Velletri railway.
- Fossa Anatolia: originating from Colle Bello (600 m), it flows at the foot of old town Velletri, until it joins the Fossa Farina.

Other water sources include the Acqua de Ferrari, at 650 metres (2,130 feet), underlying Monte de Ferrari (886 metres (2,907 feet) above sea level) at Rocca di Papa, from which is part of the municipal water supply.

=== Topography ===
The old town's altitude is substantially uniform from the elevation of Piazza Giuseppe Garibaldi at 339 m above sea level, the square of the Trivium at 332 metres (1,089 feet) above sea level, and Napoletana at 329 metres (1,079 feet) above sea level. The area west of the walled city is a bit higher at San Lorenzo reaching 372 m (1,220 ft) above sea level. The remainder of the territory to the south and west is basically flat except for small hills that do not exceed 300 m (984 ft) above sea level.

=== Climate ===
The climate of Velletri is mild, due to the Tyrrhenian Sea not being far, and to the protection offered by the Alban Hills and Mount Artemisio in the north. The climate is very rainy, with an annual average of 1,400 to 1,500 mm (55 to 59 in) precipitation, making it the rainiest city of Lazio and one of the most rainy cities in Italy. Humid currents from the southwest facing the Mont Artemisio condense all the rain on Velletri, leaving clouds restricted to the northern side of the Colli Albani. It snows rarely.

- Climate classification: Zone D, 1544 GR / G
- Atmospheric Diffusivity: average

== Etymology ==
The Latin term for "swamp" was Velia, corresponding to the Greek "ουελια" ( "Velia"). From this root came the place name Velestrom, the place next to a swamp or marsh, was probably used by Volsci to call old Velletri. The Romans named it after the same city Velitrae, hence the Greek Ουελιτραι ("Ouelitrai"), Ουελιτρα ("Ouelitra") or Βελιτρα ("Belitra").

In the Middle Ages, at least six naming variants (Velletrum, Veletrum, Veletra, Velitrum, Bellitro, Villitria) are attested by various official acts until the 11th century. Until the 18th century, Velletri survived as parallel forms of Blitri and Belitri.

== History ==
=== Ancient ===
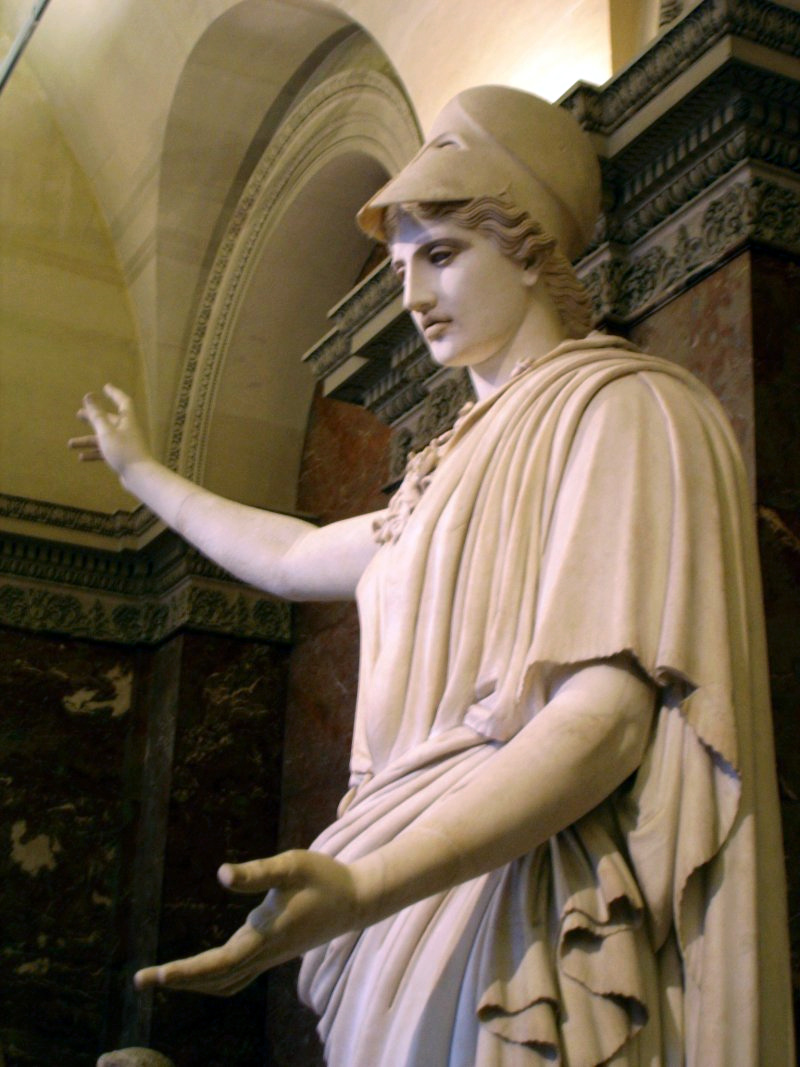
The Athena of Velletri, found in a villa near the town.

During his reign (642–617 BC), Ancus Marcius, the fourth king of Rome, came into conflict with the Volsci because the latter plundered Roman territory. He besieged the Velitrae, which was a Volscian town. The elders of the town surrendered and promised "to make good the damage they had done" and "agreed to deliver up the guilty to be punished". Ancus Marcius "concluded a treaty of peace and friendship".

In 494 BC, a war between Rome and the Volsci broke out. The Roman consul Aulus Verginius Tricostus Caeliomontanus was sent to fight the Volsci. He defeated them and " pursued their enemies beyond it to Velitrae, where vanquished and victors burst into the city in one body. More blood was shed there, in the promiscuous slaughter of all sorts of people, than had been in the battle itself. A very few were granted quarter, having come without arms and given themselves up." The Volsci "were deprived of the Veliternian land; colonists were sent from [Rome] to Velitrae and a colony was planted". In 492 BC, while the Volsci were affected by an epidemic, "the Romans increased the number of colonists at Velitrae and sent out a new colony to Norba, in the mountains, as a stronghold for the Pomptine country", which was a Volscian area near Velitrae. According to Diodorus Siculus, "the Romans increased the number of colonists in the city known as Velitrae" in 404 BC.

In 385 BC, during another war between Rome and the Volsci, the Roman colonists from Circeii and Velitrae provided a contingent which fought alongside the Volsci. The Romans found out about this because there were men from Velitrae among the prisoners they captured in a battle they won against the Volsci. They were sent to Rome and questioned. This "in no uncertain terms laid bare the defection of their respective peoples". The colonists sent envoys to Rome "to clear themselves of the charge of joining in the Volscian war and to ask for the release of the captives, that they might punish them in accordance with their own laws". Their request was denied. They received a rebuke and an order to leave the city. In 382 BC two of the military tribunes with consular power for that year, Spurius and Lucius Papirius, marched on Velitrae. They won a battle near the town in which "auxiliaries from Praeneste almost outnumbered the colonists". The enemy took refuge in the city and the tribunes "abstained from attacking the place; they were not certain of succeeding, nor did they think it right to aim at the extermination of the colony".

In 380 BC the Romans stormed Velitrae and then moved on to fight other enemies. In 370 BC the colonists of Velitrae made several incursions into Roman territory and also besieged Tusculum. The Romans drove them from Tusculum and besieged Velitrae. The siege lasted until 367 BC when Marcus Furius Camillus, after defeating a force of Gauls which had encamped near Rome, captured the town, which surrendered without a struggle.

In 340 BC the Latin cities federated in the Latin League, which had been an ally of the Romans, rebelled in what had been called the Latin War (340-338 BC). They were joined by the Campanians, the Volsci and the Roman colonies of Signa and Velitrae. After two years of fighting Rome defeated the rebels. Velitrae was punished harshly. Her walls were demolished. Her senators were exiled beyond the River Tiber (that is, they were interned in a foreign land; the Tiber was the border between Latium and Etruria). It was decreed that if a Veliternian senator crossed this river, "his redemption should be set at a thousand pounds of bronze, and that he who had captured him might not release his prisoner from bondage until the fine was paid". The town was repopulated with colonists who were settled on the lands of the senators.

Livy recorded that in 332 BC new Roman citizens were assessed in the census of that year and registered into two new Roman tribes (local administrative districts where Roman citizens were registered). These two new Roman tribes were the Maecia and Scaptia. According to Cornell and Oakley, Velitrae and Lanuvium were incorporated into the Scaptia and Maecia respectively, thus obtaining Roman citizenship.

During the Roman period, several patricians built several villas in Velitrae. Inscriptions recorded that the city had a basilica, an amphitheater and a theater. Livy noted that the city had the shrines of the gods Apollo and Sangus. Velitrae was also a noted center for wine production. Suetonius wrote: "There are many indications that the Octavian family was in days of old a distinguished one at Velitrae; for not only was a street in the most frequented part of town long ago called Octavian, but an altar was shown there besides, consecrated by an Octavius. This man was leader in a war with a neighbouring town ..." This was the family of Rome's first emperor, Augustus. Augustus was born at the Ox Head, a small property on the Palatine Hill in Rome, but spent his childhood in Velitrae. Suetonius wrote that "A small room like a pantry is shown to this day as the emperor's nursery in his grandfather's country-house near Velitrae, and the opinion prevails in the neighbourhood that he was actually born there."

=== Medieval ===
Velletri began to decline after it was sacked by Alaric the Goth in 410 CE. It was the seat of a bishopric and, in the following century, it became an imperial city after the Byzantine reconquest of Italy. The first information about Velletri in the Middle Ages is dated 465 by Adeodato, the bishop of the city. Between the 5th and 6th century, the Veliterna diocese became increasingly important. In 592, Pope Gregory I brought together the Diocese of Tres Tabernae in Velletri.

In the 10th century, Velletri fell under the rule of the Counts of Tusculum (981). The entire area of the Alban Hills and the Monti Prenestini was dominated by the Counts of Tusculum, including the fortress of Lariano next to Velletri. In 1084, Robert Guiscard marched against Rome and passed through Velletri, meeting resistance from residents, who were rewarded by the Pope in 1101, with a Breve that gave very broad boundaries to the Veliterna community.

In the 13th century, Velletri was administered in the form of a republic. It was governed by the Great Council, composed of consuls, who were then replaced by a council of novemviri (nine men), a mayor with supervisory functions, constables who were military leaders, and a podestà who had judicial duties.

Pope Alexander IV (1254–1261), former bishop of Velletri, ordered during his pontificate to bring the relics of Velletri holy martyrs Pontian and Eleuterio to be preserved in the crypt beneath the cathedral. In 1342, Nicola Caetani besieged Velletri. However, the city resisted until the arrival of reinforcements from Rome. In exchange for this help, the city had to undergo the appointment of a mayor appointed by Rome. This kind of vassalage lasted until 1374 when, following an agreement, the Podestà would be elected every six months. The first four times the choice would be directly ratified by the Romans. In 1353 the Trivium Tower was opened. It was a symbol of the city of Velletri.

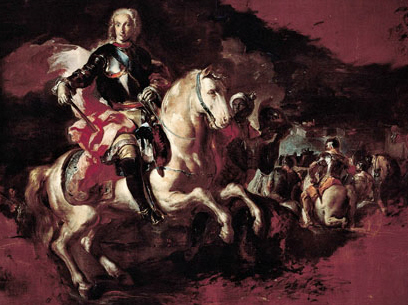
Triumph of Charles III at the Battle of Velletri by Francesco Solimena. Oil on canvas, 1744.

In 1408, Ladislaus of Naples occupied Velletri during his attempt to conquer the Papal States. In 1434, during the struggle against the Colonna and Savelli families, Pope Eugene IV razed the castle of Lariano with the assistance of 800 Velletrani soldiers. The land of Castellana was granted to Velletri, and remained merged with Velletri until 1967. On April 21, 1482, during the Salt War between Pope Sixtus IV and Ferdinand of Aragon 500 Velletrani soldiers, 250 of whom were considered to be among the best Italian archers, fought with the papal army of Roberto Malatesta in the Battle of Campomorto, in a marshy area next to the territory Velletri, now in the town of Aprilia. The Pope won and the Velletrani were rewarded for their faithfulness by the Holy See.

In 1512, Velletri was still an independent City-state. The city government was administered by the Priora, which had replaced the novemviri. In November 1526, a contingent from Velletri sent by Pope Clement VII contributed to the rainge the castle of Marino, a fiefdom of the Colonna family, who at the time were enemies of the Pope and allies of Spain. Following this, Ascanio Colonna, the lord of Marino, sacked Rome of May 7, 1527. The Pope was imprisoned in (Castel Sant'Angelo), forcing Velletri to pay 15,000 crowns in municipal lands, 12,600 crowns in installments, and provide more than 6,000 rubbia lime and 15,000 tiles to repair the damage done to Marino. Mercenaries of the Colonnas took up lots in Velletri. In 1589, Pope Sixtus V dissolved the civilian government, but Pope Gregory XIV ordered the reunification of the two powers (papal and civilian) in 1591, thus sealing the definitive end of the free municipality.

=== Modern ===
In the War of the Austrian Succession (1740–1748), the troops of the Spanish-Nepolitan Bourbons won the Battle of Velletri, fought against Austrian Habsburgs in Velletri and its surroundings.

After the French Revolution, Velletri rebelled and it was proclaimed a Republic. Later it changed sides and 900 of its citizens resisted in Castel Gandolfo the siege by Joachim Murat. The Republic lasted until 1814.

Garibaldi won a battle with the Bourbon Neapolitan force at Velletri, but the victory was short-lived as the Roman Republic was overwhelmed soon after this.

A telegraph line reached Velletri in 1856. In 1866, Pope Pius IX opened the Roma-Velletri railway, the third rail of the Papal States and one of the first in Italy. This helped the growth of the town even after the transition to the Kingdom of Italy.

In 1913, the Tramvie dei Castelli Romani tram line reached Velletri, connecting it directly to Rome and the rest of the Castelli Romani area until 1953. In 1927, the fascist regime instituted the National Grape and Wine Festival, which is still celebrated today in October.

in the last days of May 1944 Velletri was at the center of the conflict which followed the Anglo-American landing at Anzio (22 January 1944) during the Second World War. While the Gustav Line at Cassino and the Hitler Line at Pontecorvo were falling to the enemy the Germans created a third fortified line, the Caesar Line, which stretched between Torvaianica, Lanuvio, Velletri, Artena, and Valmontone. The First Division paratroopers of the Wehrmacht was stationed at Velletri. The U.S. General Mark Wayne Clark ordered the May 25 offensive against the Caesar line facing strong resistance. The 36th U.S. Infantry Division commanded by General Fred Walker spotted a flaw in the German defenses on Mount Artemisio between Velletri and Valmontone. Between 30 and 31 May 1944, the 142nd and 143rd regiments penetrated the German defenses at Monte Artemisio, and on June 1 Velletri fell, followed the next day by Valmontone and on 3 June by Lanuvio and Castelli Romani. Velletri and its most important monuments were virtually destroyed; the Tower of the Trivium at the Palazzo Comunale and Palazzo Ginnetti were never rebuilt. Despite the evacuation order of German military authorities, there were civilian casualties.

The rebuilding of Velletri continued despite a devolution in 1967 granted independent municipal status to Lariano. The Suburbicarian See of Velletri-Segni was created. New schools and cultural centers were built. The new seat of the Tribunal, the Cadets Battalion NCO of the Carabinieri, the Regiment of Cadets Brigadier Marshals, and new prison were established.

In 2000, the new library called Biblioteca Comunale Augusto Tersenghi was inaugurated. here were also the opening of the Teatro di Terra (1995), the reopening of the Ugo Tognazzi Theater and the restoration of the Civic Archaeological Museum and of the Diocesan Museum.

On 14 June 2001, Mario Pepe of the Chamber of Deputies presented a bill on the establishment of the province of the Castelli Romani with Velletri as its capital . In the proposal the following municipalities would be part of the new province: Albano Laziale, Anzio, Ardea, Ariccia, Artena, Carpineto Romano, Castel Gandolfo, Cave, Colleferro, Colonna, Gavignano, Genazzano, Genzano di Roma, Grottaferrata, Lanuvio, Lariano, Marino, Monte Compatri, Montelanico, Monte Porzio Catone, Nemi, Nettuno, Olevano Romano, Palestrina, Pomezia, Rocca di Papa, Rocca Priora, San Cesareo, San Vito Romano, Valmontone, Velletri, and Zagarolo. Velletri was chosen as the provincial capital because of its central position, which confirmed "the role and the strategic importance of Velletri". The budget allocated to the province, once established, was 460 million lire. On 23 September 2007, Pope Benedict XVI, who as Cardinal Bishop had the title of Velletri-Segni, visited Velletri celebrating a Mass in Piazza San Clemente.

== Main sights ==
=== Churches ===
- The Velletri Cathedral or Cathedral of St Clement was erected in the 4th century over the ruins of a pagan temple. It has three naves and was rebuilt in the current form in 1659–1662. The Renaissance portal is by Traiano da Palestrina (1512). The interior has several frescoes, while the Capitular Museum houses important relics, vessels and paintings including works by Gentile da Fabriano and Antoniazzo Romano.
- The Bell tower of Santa Maria in Trivio (Trivium), erected in 1353 in Lombard-Gothic style, in gratitude for the liberation of the city from a plague that devastated it in 1348. Symbol of the city.
- Holy Savior church
- San Michele Arcangelo: A church at the site was built atop a pagan temple dedicated to Mars
- San Martino: Church dates to 11th century, but present Neoclassical facade dates to 1825
- Sant'Antonio di Padova church
- San Francesco d'Assisi church
- San Lorenzo church
- Most Holy Peter and Bartholomew church
- Santa Chiara church
- Santa Teresa church
- Sant'Antonio Abate church
- San Crispino church
- Church of the Chaplet church
- San Silvestro church
- Madonna della Neve church
- Oratorio di Santa Maria del Sangue
- Santa Trinita Church

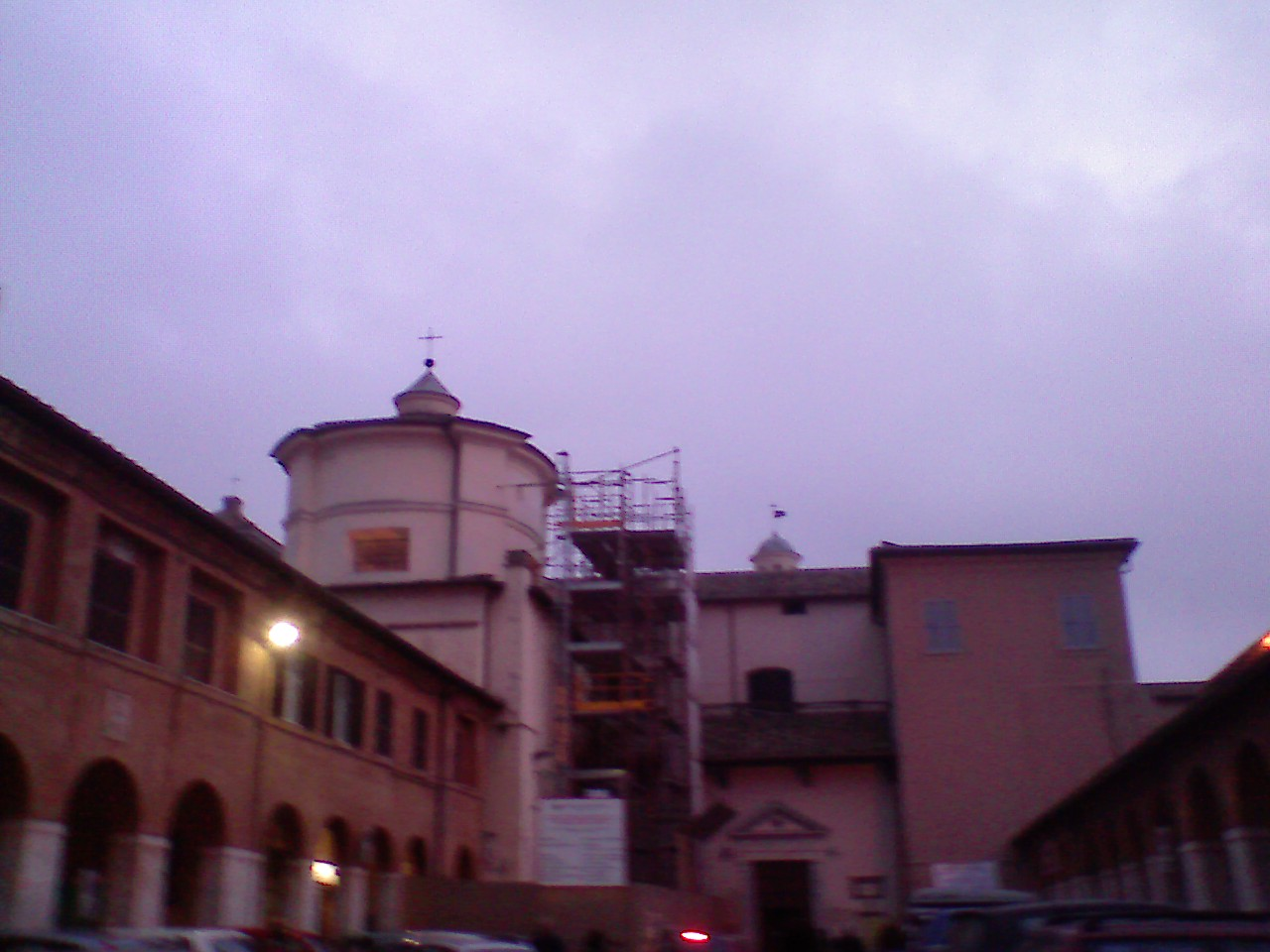
Cathedral of St. Clement

- Santa Apollonia church
- San Giovanni in Plagis church
- San Giovanni Battista church
- St Mary of the Garden church
- Santa Maria degli Angeli church
- Holy Cross on Mount Calvary church
- Saint Stephen church
- Santa Maria del Carmine church
- Regina Pacis church

=== Public buildings ===
There are numerous public fountains in Velletri, some of them monumental. They are all served by the city aqueduct, which was built in the 17th century by the engineer Giovanni Fontana. The aqueduct was destroyed during a war in late 1744 and repaired by the engineer Girolamo Romani in 1842–1845. Notable fountains are:

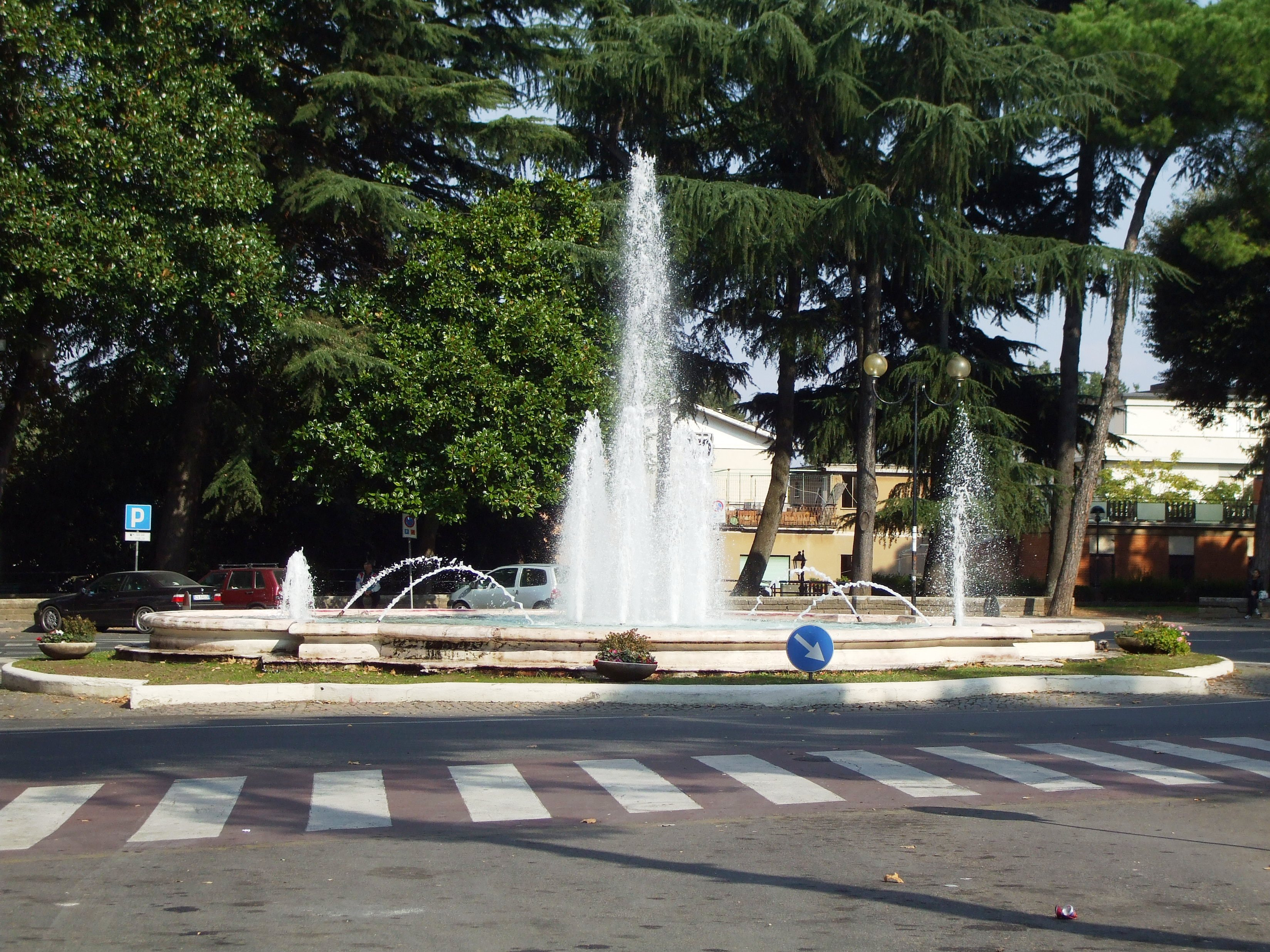
The Fontana di Piazza Giuseppe Garibaldi

- Fontana di Piazza Giuseppe Garibaldi, was built around 1912;
- Fountain of Piazza Benedetto Cairoli, built in 1622

Notable buildings are:

- Piazza Giuseppe Mazzini fountain, built in 1612 to a design of the architect Massimiliano Bruni. Its travertine fountain depicts mythological scenes;
- The Palazzo Comunale (Town Hall), with a portico entrance, was begun in 1572 by Giacomo della Porta to a design of Jacopo Barozzi da Vignola. It wasfinished in 1741 by Filippo Barigioni. It was the seat of the Priors, or ruling authorities, of Velletri and the Great Council. The first stone of the new building, was laid on January 26, 1575. Completed in 1590, and destroyed in 1944, the palace has now been substantially rebuilt true to the original project.
- Palazzo Vecchio, begun in 1822 as the seat of the Delegation of Velletri. In 1870 it became the Palazzo della Giustizia, the seat of the courts. It was damaged in 1944, and it has been rebuilt following closely the original layout.
- Palazzo Toruzzi
- Palazzo Borgia
- Palazzo Alfonsi
- Palazzo Corsini

=== Fortifications ===
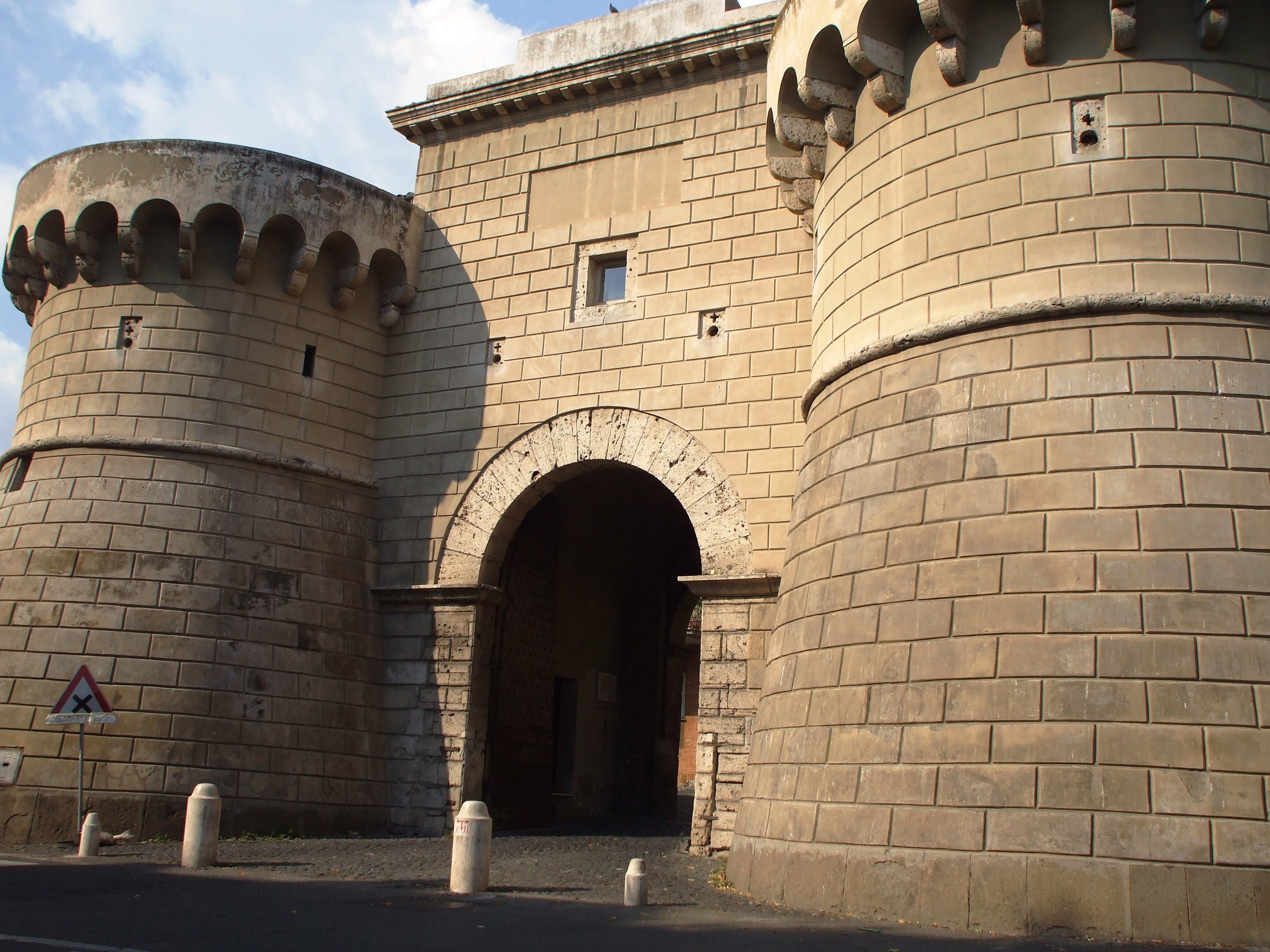
The Porta Napoletana

When Velletri was a Volscian town it was surrounded by massive walls. However, they were razed to the ground in 338 BC as a punishment after the final Roman conquest of the city. The walls were not rebuilt until the Middle Ages. In the Middle Ages, Velletri was surrounded by mighty castle walls which originally had six gates: Porta Fura, Porta del Pontone, Porta Santa Martina (o Portella), Porta Lucia, Porta Romana, and Porta Napoletana. In the 16th century, the city strengthened the walls by closing certain gates and keeping only three of them: Porta Lucia, Porta Napoletana, and Porta Romana. They were:

- Porta Napoletana, which was built in 1511 by laborers from Lombardy. It has survived virtually unscathed to this day and now houses the local branch of the AIS (Italian Sommelier Association).
- Porta Romana was rebuilt in 1573 to a design by Jacopo Barozzi da Vignola, near the bastions of the town. However, during extension works on the Appian Way, the gate was destroyed and was replaced by the blocco di Porta Romana, a customs post, and then the current Piazza Giuseppe Garibaldi.

The War Memorial, designed by Emanuele Cannigia was inaugurated on June 2, 1927, in before King Victor Emmanuel III. It is located in a corner of Piazza Giuseppe Garibaldi.

=== Archaeological sites ===
The Oreste Nardini Civic Archeological Museum of Velletri, has noteworthy works from protohistoric to the medieval period. The existence of a Roman amphitheatre in Velitrae is attested to by a curve in area adjacent to the Town Hall and an inscription found in the 1565.

The bronze sheets of Velletri were found within the structure of the Church of the St. Francis in 1784, and are kept at the National Archaeological Museum of Naples.

The site of the Villa degli Ottavi, sub-urban residence of the gens Octavia and Augustus, the only Roman villa it the Velletri area, was identified outside the village of San Cesareo. Carefully excavated, the site shows evidence of a 15.05 x 13.20 m three-nave Roman cistern of the republican period. It is unique because it had pointed arches, and a mosaic. The area currently is private property. Another Roman cistern was discovered in 1982 along the ancient route of the Appian Way in Capanna Murata.

=== Green areas ===
The main urban green area is the Giardino Comunale (Municipal Garden) in via Orti Ginnetti. It previously was the Villa Ginnetti and the Ginnetti Allotments (Orti). There are other green areas: the recently restored Gardens of St. Mary, in the suburbs towards Nettuno, which has an ice skating rink, fountains and a bar, and the Muratori Park.

== Society ==
=== Languages and dialects ===
The official language of Velletri is obviously Italian, while the Veliterno dialect (called Velletrano) is more commonly spoken. It is distinguished from neighboring dialects of the Castelli Romani area and the Roman dialect because it is more akin to the Central-Northern Lazian and Neapolitan dialect. The Veliterno dialect, is often unintelligible for those who do not normally speak Italian. It is characterized by a predominance of the vowel "o" and Neapolitan expressions such as "nanny" for a father, "am dead" for dead. The first dictionary of the Velletrano dialect was published in the 1980s.

=== Institutions and government services ===
- Court of Velletri: in Piazza Giovanni Falcone, is the second most important court of Lazio, preceded only by Rome.
- Velletri Prison: in the district Lazzara, it is a maximum security prison which housed Filippo Pappalardi and Angelo Izzo.
- The Regiment of Cadets Brigadier Marshals and Velletri Police.
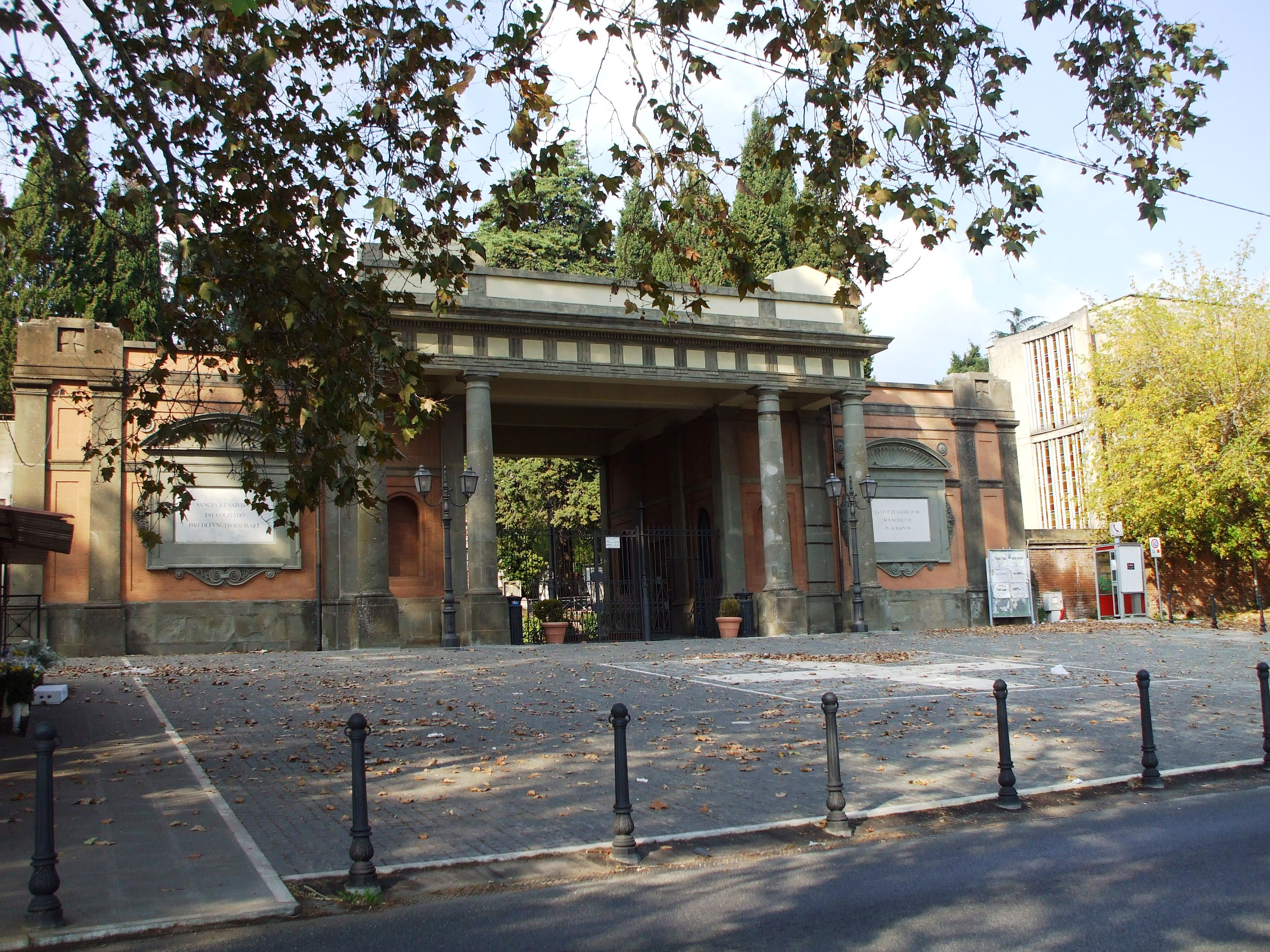
  Velletri Cemetery Gate
- Commissariato della Guardia di Finanza of Velletri.
- Artemisia Teatro Terra
- Association Committee Velletri South
- Cultural Association 'A Matticella
- Cultural Association for the dance "Terpsichore"
- Associazione Culturale "University of Carnival"
- Italian Association of Sommeliers of Velletri
- Association "Sbandieratori e Musici di Velletri" - Flag-throwers & drummers
- Association Proloco Velitrae
- Calliope Cultural Association
- The Velletri Environment Spinosa
- Velletri Motorclub
- Lions Club of Velletri
- Rotary Club of Velletri

== Culture ==
=== Education ===
==== Libraries ====
The main public library in Velletri is the Biblioteca Comunale (Municipal Library) Augusta Tersenghi. It has several book collections assembled by individuals from the 18th century and is an integral part of SBCR (Library System of the Castelli Romani).

==== Schools ====
In 1999–2000, 10,090 children attended schools of all levels in the area of Velletri:

- Kindergarten: 1346 members
- Elementary Schools: 2656 members
- Junior High Schools: 1773 members
- High Schools: 4265 members
- Consortium University of Velletri: 50 members

===== Primary schools =====
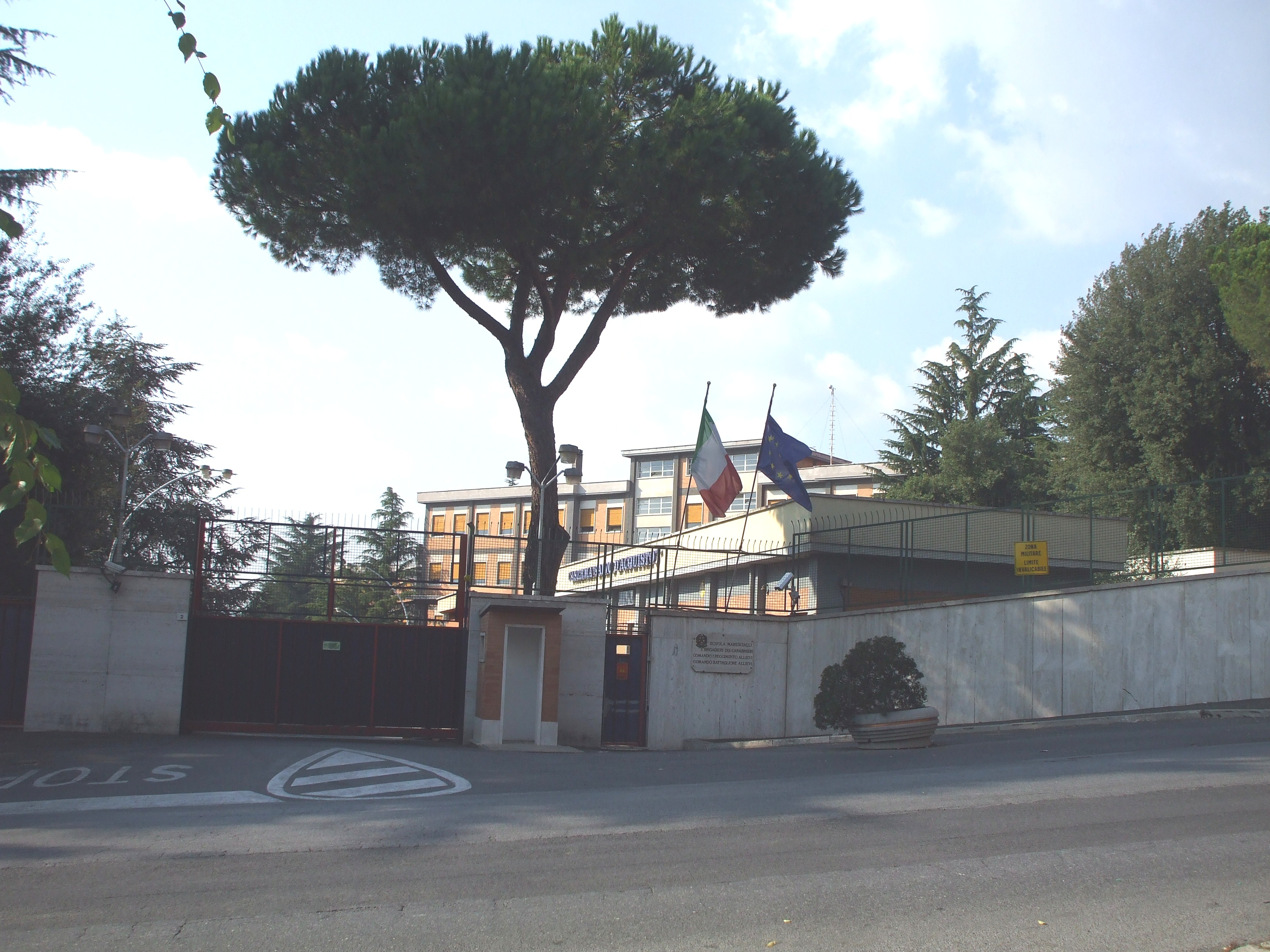
Velletri Military school for carabinieri

The first schools for children in Velletri had very old roots. The Conservatorio di zitelle per l'educazione della fanciulle (conservatory for old maids and for the education of young girls) and the istituto di Suore Orsoline (institute of the Orsoline Nuns) were founded in 1690 and 1695 respectively. They merged in 1713 and continued to exist until 1870. The Maestre Pie Venerini teachers opened their house in 1744. An Institute of the Brothers of Christian Schools was founded in 1836 and disbanded in 1850 due to lack of facilities. A primary school conjoined with the Royal Normal School was opened in 1874.

===== Colleges =====
A College of the Society of Jesus was established in Velletri by the papal bull of Pope Pius IX, Quod Divina Sapientia on April 7, 1851.

The Royal Normal School was established at Velletri by royal decree of September 23, 1872, to meet the need for better training for primary school teachers in the province of Rome. In 1891 the school was named after Clemente Cardinali (1789–1839), an archaeologist and intellectual from Velletri.

The Antonio Mancinelli Falconi-Dante Institute of Further Education is the result of a merger between various educational bodies. It runs courses in the classics, languages, socio-psycho-pedagogy and social sciences at high school level.

The Giancarlo Vallauri Istituto Tecnico Industriale Statale is a technical school which was founded in 1960 as a branch of the Enrico Fermi Institute of Rome. It became autonomous in 1968. Since then it has had over 6000 graduates. Today, it has 50 classes and a thousand pupils. It offers courses in science and technology.

The Istituto Tecnico Commerciale Statale Professionale Cesare Battisti is a college rather rooted in Velletri with courses in hospitality.

The L'Istituto di Istruzione Superiore "Juana Romani" is an art school. There is also the agricultural college in Via Ferruccio Parri.

===== University =====
The University of Velletri established under the Suburbicarian see of Ostia. In 1150 it was merged with the Diocese of Velletri. with Ostia's severe loss of population, the university was moved to Velletri, where form 1817 it run humanities courses which led to degrees.

Velletri is currently home to the University of Tuscia Faculty of Agriculture in Viterbo.

=== Museums ===
- The Oreste Nardini Civic Archaeological Museum has some substantial works, like the Velletri Sarcophagus, and Sarcophagus of the labors of Hercules. The museum is divided into two routes:
  - The Archaeological Route is the heart of the collection, the Sarcophagus of the Labors of Hercules, dating to the 2nd century and discovered in 1955, the Orontes plate of the 4th century, and the terracotta Volsci, discovered in 1910 are here.
  - The Geopaleontological and Prehistory of the Alban Hills opened in 2005. It is a journey into the prehistory of the Colli Albani area. It is divided into five sections:
    - Geology: a spectacular "fire pipe" leads the visitor into an environment that reproduces a volcanic eruption
    - Paleontology: fossils are exposed and explains the fossilization
    - Anthropology: human development from the first men on is explored
    - Prehistory: human development before the discovery of fire
    - Protohistory: explores the life of man before writing
- Diocesan Museum, in the cloister of the cathedral contains works of art, which are especially important for their uniqueness. Among these are the 11th-12th century's reliquary Crux Veliterna and the enamel works by Gentile da Fabriano, Lorenzo di Bicci, Antoniazzo Romano, Giovan Battista Rositi, Francesco da Siena, Giuliano Finelli, and Sebastiano Conca. The Cross or Crux Veliterna is a gold filigree(i.e. a cross containing a relic of a fragment of the Holy Cross), with precious stones and cloisonne enamels placed on a base of silver and gilded bronze. On the front there is a fragment of enkolpion depicting Christ crucified, while towards the Agnus Dei is surrounded by anthropomorphic symbols of the Evangelists. The Cross was donated by Frederick II of Hohenstaufen to Pope Alexander IV, who, in turn, donated it to the Velitrae Cathedral. The Madonna and Child by Gentile da Fabriano is the only work the artist made during his Roman period (September 1426 – September 1427).

== Media ==
=== Radio ===
The radio station Radio Delta Stereo Velletri hadsbeen on frequency 103.3 since 1976. Radio Mania is a radio station that broadcasts on frequency 88.2.

=== Press ===
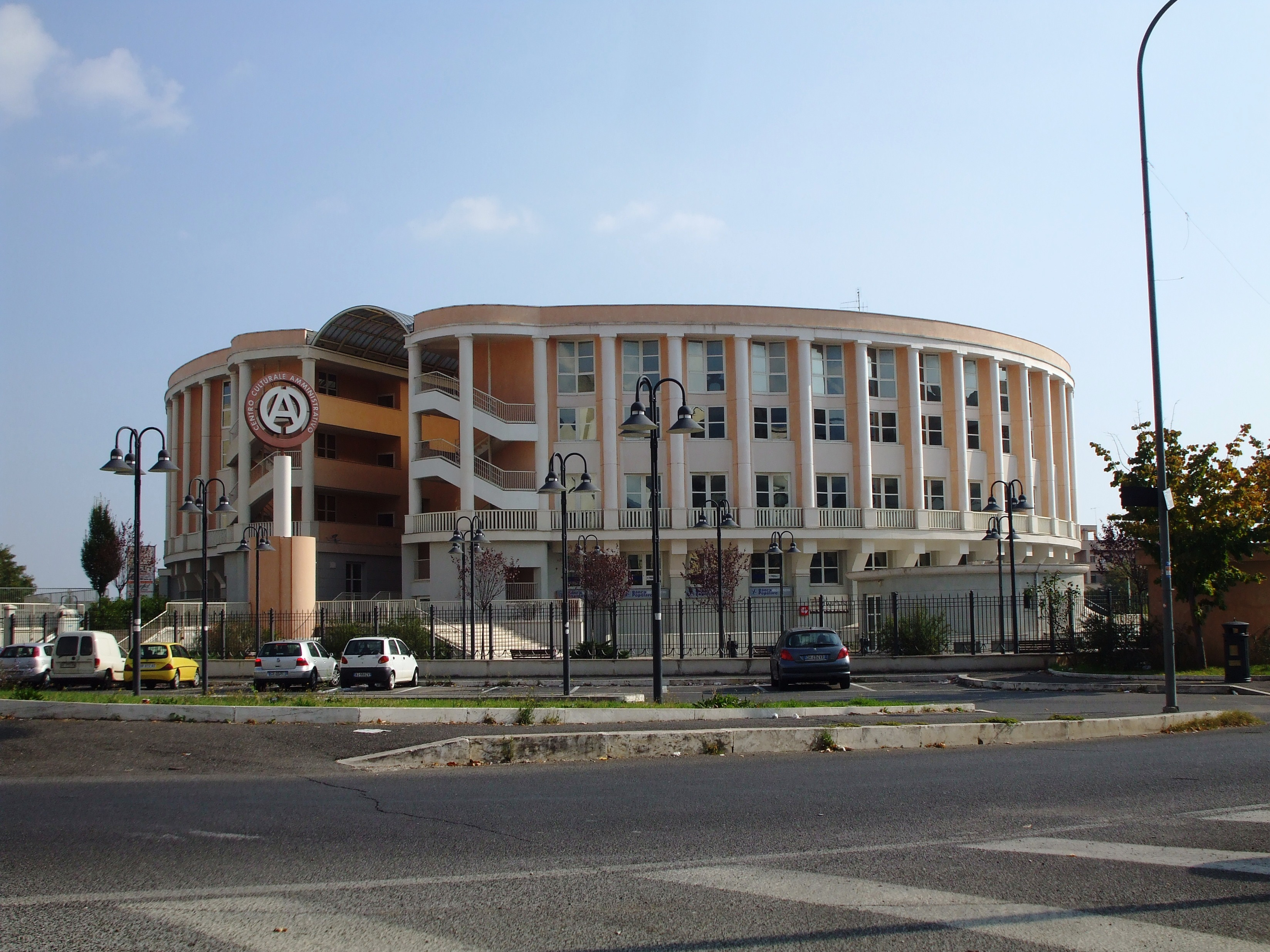
Velletri Cultural Center

The paid subscription newspapers of Velletri are New Castle Today (with drafting in Piazza Cairoli) and Il Messaggero. The various free local newspapers are Free News, The Voice of the Castle, and Cape Point.

=== Cinema ===
Velletri has a well established film tradition. In addition to several studios in the town in the early 20th century, there has always been at least one cinema. Helios Filme studio was established in the town in 1900. In 1911 it released its film Dante's The Inferno. It was filmed entirely in the countryside in Velletri and at the Lake Giulianello.

=== Television ===
The Lazio regional TV, with the daily news (Tg Velletri Lazio), is located in Velletri.

=== Theater ===
Velletri has three theaters. Two of these are the Ugo Tognazzi Theater and the Theater of the Earth.

== Music ==
Velletri has hosted a Philharmonic Concert at the Palazzo Comunale since the 19th century.

== Events ==
- Festival of Saint Clemente, November 23
- Festival of Santa Maria delle Grazie
- The Pasquella is held on January 5: it consists of parade in period costumes
- National Grape and Wine Festival, October
- Festival of Camellias, these flowers which grow in the countryside have been celebrated since 1994 in March
- Matticella Artichoke Festival, May
- Palio delle Decarcie

== Anthropogenic geography ==
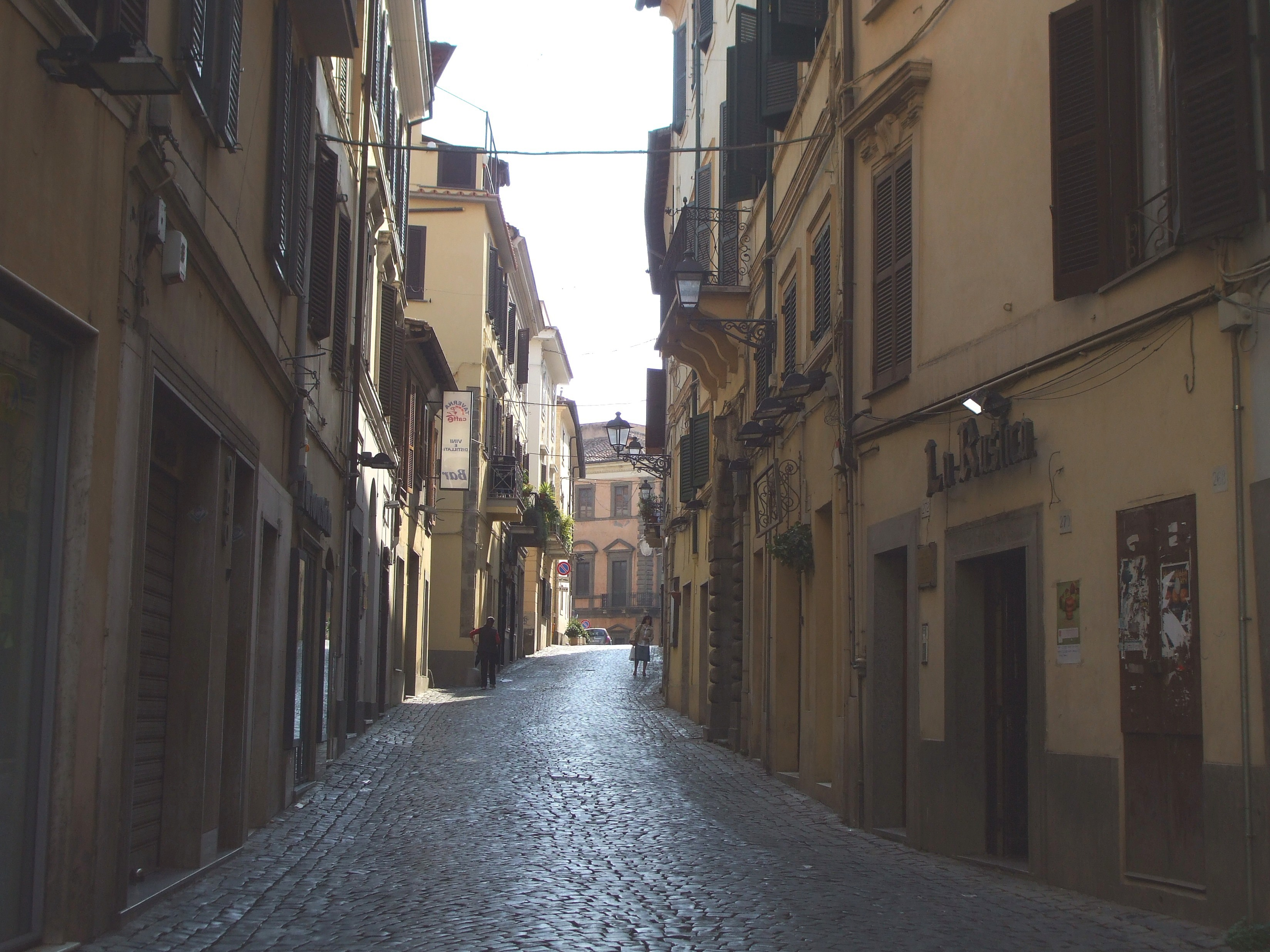
Velletri Corso della Repubblica

Velletri has been divided into five decarcìe (singular decarcìa), areas equivalent to districts, since the medieval period. The name decarcia presumed to mean "power of ten" from to the Greek words δεκα (deka, "ten") and αρχια (Arkia, "power"). However, currently there are six decarcie. The decarcie are:

- Decarcia Portella
- Decarcia Collicello
- Decarcia Santa Maria
- Decarcia Castle
- Decarcia Saint Lucia
- Decarcia San Salvatore

== Economy ==
=== Agriculture ===
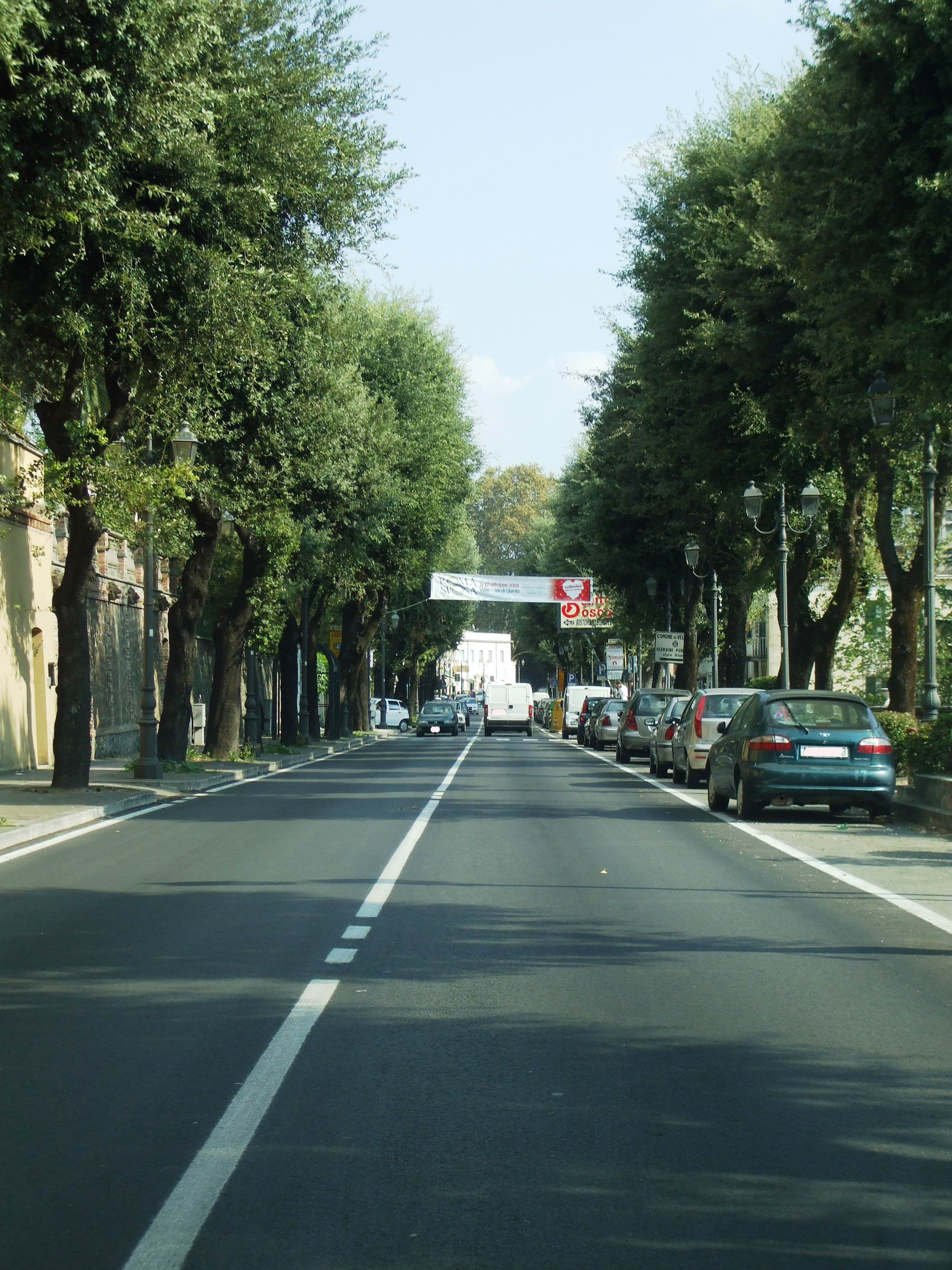
Via Appia in Velletri

The primary production in Velletri is wine and products of the surrounding agricultural region. In 1851, the wine production of the area was around 14,000 barrels, which was sold mainly to Rome. The territory of Velletri produces the following DOC wines:

- Velletri White
- Velletri Bianco Superiore
- Velletri red
- Velletri Rosso Riserva

At the end of the 19th century, the Velletri Experimental Winery was opened by the University of Tuscia.

==== Velletri DOC ====
The varieties of Italian wine DOC Velletri produces are red and white wines from grapes that are limited to a harvest yield of 16 tonnes/ha. The reds are blends of 30-50% Montepulciano, 30-45% Sangiovese, at least 15% Cesanese and no more than 10% of a mix of Bombino nero, Merlot and Ciliegiolo. The whites are blends of up to 70% Malvasia, up to 30% of a mix of Trebbiano, Verdeca and Giallo, and up to 10% of a mix of Bellone and Bonvino.

=== Tourism ===
Velletri was a mandatory stop between Rome and Naples on the Grand Tour d'Italie. It attracts travelers to its museum collections, its architecture and its natural environment.

== Sports ==
The Stadio Comunale Giovanni Scavo has a capacity of about 5,000 spectators and hosts its soccer team. The Stadio Comunale B is a smaller pitch (105x60 m) with a single stand with a capacity of about 500 people. It is a practice pitch for teams which play in the lower leagues.

The sports hall host the cities basketball and volleyball teams, It opened in December 2008, and it is located in San Biagio. It has a capacity of over 2000 spectators. It is used for the major domestic competitions, and is named after Spartaco Bandinelli, a decorated Olympic boxer.

The multipurpose gym as has functioned as a multiple sport centre for many years. It remains a major multi sport facility where volleyball and basketball games are also held. It has a capacity of about 1,000 spectators.

== Notable citizens ==
- Augustus (Velletri, 63 BC - Rome, 14 AD), 1st Emperor of the Roman Empire
- Juana Romani (Velletri, 1867-1924 born Carolina Carlesimo), portrait painter
- Spartaco Bandinelli (Velletri, 1921 - Velletri, 1997), boxer, silver medal at the 1948 Summer Olympics.
- Marta Bastianelli (Velletri, born 1987), road cycling world champion
- Elisa Blanchi (Velletri, born 1987), Olympic gymnast
- Alessandro Borgia (1682–1784), archbishop and historian
- Stefano Borgia (Velletri, 1731 - Lyon, 1804), cardinal, and author
- Alessio Cerci (Velletri, 1987), footballer in Italian Serie A
- Marco Ferrante, footballer in Italian Serie A
- Antonio Mancinelli (1454–1505), poet and humanist
- Veronica Olivier (Velletri, 1990), actress and model
- Mirko Pagliarini (Velletri, 1975), footballer

== International relations ==
=== Twin towns – sister cities ===
Velletri is twinned with:

Esch-sur-Alzette, Luxembourg; Mödling, Austria; Offenbach, Germany; Puteaux, France	Saint-Gilles, Belgium; Tilburg, Netherlands; Tower Hamlets, United Kingdom; Zemun, Serbia
