= Velletri Madonna =

Painting by Gentile da Fabriano

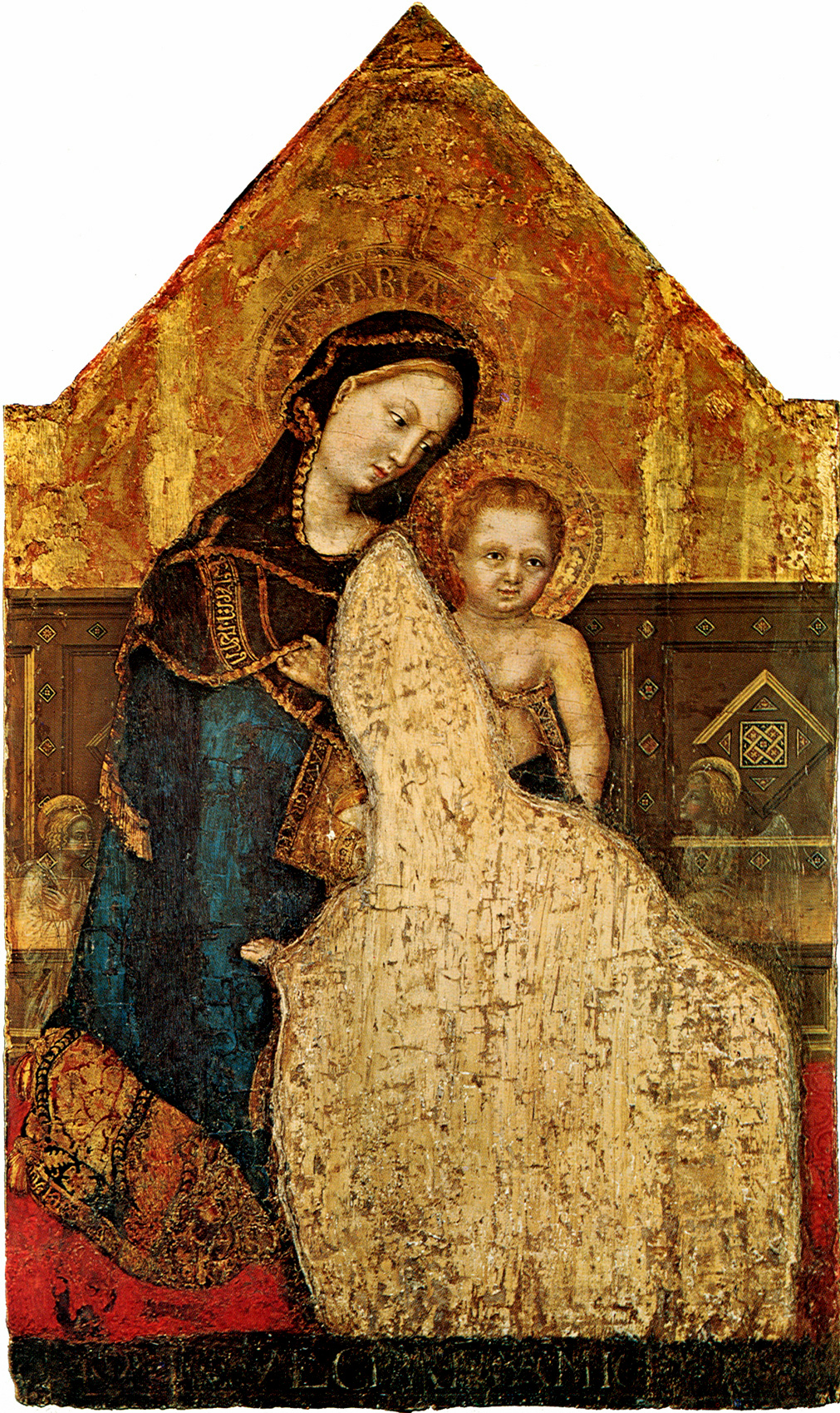
Velletri Madonna (c. 1426-1427) by Gentile da Fabriano

The Velletri Madonna is a tempera and gold on panel painting by Gentile da Fabriano, executed c. 1426-1427, the only surviving work from his stay in Rome (perhaps from 1426 but definitely from 28 January 1427). A Madonna of humility, it was in the church of Santi Cosma e Damiano until 1633 when Ludovico Ciotti di San Paolo, General of the Third Order Franciscans, donated it to the Church of Sant'Apollonia in Velletri. It is now in the Diocesan Museum in Velletri. A restoration in 1912 restored the top to its original triangular form.

== Description ==
The panel is very damaged, with the complete loss of color along the joints of the boards and in a large portion of the center, which however spares the faces of Mary and the Child. It is a Madonna of humility, with Mary sitting on a cushion, richly decorated, on the ground, against the background of a panel decorated with inlays and carvings in the Sienese manner. In Mary's halo we can read the inscription "[a]ve maria [grat]ia [plena]" and on the hem of her mantle "AVE GRATI[A]".

Mary had to assume a three-quarter side position, in the sign of a bodily fullness that is also noticeable in the surviving part of the Child, who holds a strip of the mother's cloak. A toe of his foot shows that he could joyfully kick around. Two angels on either side are painted with light brush strokes to create an evanescent and otherworldly apparition, a device used by Gentile in other works as well.
