= Pagliarani =

Pagliarani is an Italian surname. Notable people with the surname include:

- Davide Pagliarani (born 1970), Italian traditionalist Catholic priest
- Elio Pagliarani (1927–2012), Italian poet and literary critic

== See also ==
- Pagliarini
