= Football at the 2009 Mediterranean Games =

2009 Mediterranean Games football tournament
Tournament details
- Host country: Italy
- City: Pescara
- Dates: 25 June – 5 July
- Teams: 12
- Venues: 6 (in 6 host cities)

Final positions
- Champions: Spain (2nd title)
- Runners-up: Italy
- Third place: Libya
- Fourth place: France

Tournament statistics
- Matches played: 19
- Goals scored: 44 (2.32 per match)
- Top scorer(s): (Greece) Michalis Pavlis (4 goals) (Tunisia) Khaled Ayari (4 goals)

The 2009 Mediterranean Games football tournament was the 16th edition of the Mediterranean Games men's football tournament. The football tournament was held in Pescara, Italy between 25 June and 5 July 2009 as part of the 2009 Mediterranean Games and was contested by 12 teams, all countries were represented by the U-20 teams. Spain won the gold medal.

== Participating teams ==
Federation	Nation
CAF Africa	Libya; Morocco; Tunisia
AFC Asia	Syria
UEFA Europe	Albania; France; Greece; Italy (hosts); Malta; Montenegro; Spain (holders); Turkey

== System ==
The 12 teams were divided into four groups of three teams. Teams were awarded three points for a win and one for a draw. No points were awarded for a defeat. The top side in each group would advance to the semi-finals. If two or more teams were tied for a particular position, then the tie-breaking system would be as follows:

- Highest number of points obtained in all group matches;
- The result in the eventual direct match between two tied teams;
- Goal difference in all group matches;
- Greatest number of goals scored in all group matches.

== Squads ==
Each team's eighteen-man squad had to consist of players born after January 1, 1989. The squads must have been submitted no later than June 11, 2009. Each member of the winning team was awarded a gold medal. The runners-up all received a silver medal, and the third-placed team all received a bronze medal. Each member of each side placed 4th-8th in the competition received a diploma.

== Venues ==
6 stadia were allocated to host the matches

Stadium	City	Capacity
Stadio Adriatico	Pescara	25,000
Stadio Guido Angelini	Chieti	12,750
Stadio Comunale	Teramo	7,498
Stadio Guido Biondi	Lanciano	6,400
Stadio dei Marsi	Avezzano	3,692
Stadio Valle Anzuca	Francavilla al Mare	3,500

== Draw ==
The draw for the groups was made on May 8, 2009, and was conducted by Eusebio Di Francesco

== Tournament ==
=== Group stage ===
==== Group A ====
Team	Pld	W	D	L	GF	GA	GD	Pts
Italy	2	1	1	0	4	2	+2	4
Greece	2	1	0	1	5	3	+2	3
Syria	2	0	1	1	1	5	-4	1

25 June 2009
18:00 CET

Italy	1–1	Syria
Sciacca 38'	Report	Shahen 74'

Stadio dei Marsi, Avezzano
Referee: Fernando Teixeira Vitienes (Spain)

27 June 2009
17:00 CET

Greece	4–0	Syria
Soiledis 29'; Pavlis 42', 68'; Niklitsiotis 75'	Report

Stadio dei Marsi, Avezzano
Referee: Nikola Dabanović (Montenegro)

29 June 2009
20:00 CET

Italy	3 –1	Greece
Mustacchio 28', 55'; Sciacca 76'	Report	Pavlis 34'

Stadio dei Marsi, Avezzano
Referee: Olivier Thual (France)

==== Group B ====
Team	Pld	W	D	L	GF	GA	GD	Pts
France	2	2	0	0	3	0	+3	6
Turkey	2	1	0	1	5	2	+3	3
Malta	2	0	0	2	0	6	-6	0

25 June 2009
17:00 CET

France	2–0	Turkey
Malonga 20'; Joseph-Monrose 76'	Report

Stadio Comunale, Teramo
Referee: Gamail Embaia (Libya)

27 June 2009
17:00 CET

Malta	0–5	Turkey
	Report	Aygunes 14'; Albayrak 36', 49'; Basdas 53'; Gokoglan 54'

Stadio Comunale, Teramo
Referee: Vasilios Pamporidis (Greece)

29 June 2009
17:00 CET

France	1–0	Malta
Lasimant 7'	Report

Stadio Comunale, Teramo
Referee: Fernando Teixeira Vitienes (Spain)

==== Group C ====
Team	Pld	W	D	L	GF	GA	GD	Pts
Libya	2	0	2	0	0	0	0	2
Montenegro	2	0	2	0	0	0	0	2
Morocco	Withdrew							

Morocco withdrew from the competition so Libya and Montenegro ensured qualification to the next round. Their matches only determined group ranking.

25 June 2009
17:00 CET

Libya	0–0	Montenegro
	Report

Stadio Guido Biondi, Lanciano
Referee: Olivier Thual (France)

29 June 2009
17:00 CET

Montenegro	0–0	Libya
	Report
Penalties
Novović (penalty scored); Durutović (penalty missed); Savić (penalty scored); Vuković (penalty missed)	2–4	(penalty scored) Mansor; (penalty scored) Gagom; (penalty scored) Altriki; (penalty scored) Ahmed

Stadio Guido Biondi, Lanciano
Referee: Mauro Bergonzi (Italy)

==== Group D ====
Team	Pld	W	D	L	GF	GA	GD	Pts
Spain	2	1	1	0	5	2	+3	4
Tunisia	2	1	1	0	4	3	+1	4
Albania	2	0	0	2	1	5	-4	0

25 June 2009
17:00 CET

Spain	2–2	Tunisia
Sassi 29' (o.g.); Aarón 67'	Report	Ayari 57', 59'

Stadio Valle Anzuca, Francavilla al Mare
Referee: Mauro Bergonzi (Italy)

27 June 2009
17:00 CET

Albania	1–2	Tunisia
Shehaj 23'	Report	Ben Messaoud 27'; Ayari 35'

Stadio Valle Anzuca, Francavilla al Mare
Referee: Fırat Aydınus (Turkey)

29 June 2009
17:00 CET

Spain	3–0	Albania
Kike 11'; Aarón 12'; Botía 77'	Report

Stadio Valle Anzuca, Francavilla al Mare
Referee: Nikola Dabanović (Montenegro)

=== Knockout stage ===
Semi-finals
1 July – Francavilla
Italy	1
Libya	0
1 July – Teramo
France	1
Spain	2

Final
4 July – Pescara
Italy	1
Spain	2
Third place
4 July – Chieti
Libya	0 (8)
France	0 (7)

==== Semi-finals ====
1 July 2009
17:00 CET

Italy	1–0	Libya
Garibaldi 3'	Report

Stadio Valle Anzuca, Francavilla al Mare
Referee: Vasilios Pompiridis (Greece)
1 July 2009
20:30 CET

France	1–2	Spain
Tabanou 87'	Report	Nsue 42'; Laguardia 51'

Stadio Comunale, Teramo
Referee: Nikola Dabanovic (Montenegro)

==== 5–8 Places ====
1 July 2009
17:00 CET

Greece	2–1	Montenegro
Pavlis 66'; Barboudis 81'	Report	Bogdanović 59'

Stadio dei Marsi, Avezzano
Referee: Fırat Aydınus (Turkey)

1 July 2009
17:00 CET

Turkey	2–1	Tunisia
Aygunes 46'; Calik 79'	Report	Jebbari 17'

Stadio Valle Anzuca, Francavilla al Mare
Referee: Gamail Embaia (Libya)

==== Seventh place match ====
3 July 2009
17:00 CET

Montenegro	0–1	Tunisia
	Report	Ayari 77'

Stadio Guido Biondi, Lanciano
Referee: Olivier Thual (France)

==== Fifth place match ====
3 July 2009
20:30 CET

Greece	1–1	Turkey
Barboudis 62'	Report	Simsek 19'
Penalties
	6–5

Stadio Comunale, Teramo

==== Third place match ====
4 July 2009
19:00 CET

Libya	0–0	France
	Report
Penalties
Mansor (penalty scored); Gagom (penalty missed); Altriki (penalty scored); Ahmed (penalty scored); Zrimeg (penalty scored); Elmhashhash (penalty scored); Issa (penalty missed); Abubaker (penalty scored); Elgarmadi (penalty scored); Elzaredi (penalty scored)	8–7	(penalty scored) Ravet; (penalty scored) Pied; (penalty missed) Bakar; (penalty scored) Mustivar; (penalty scored) Guidileye; (penalty scored) Malonga; (penalty missed) Coubronne; (penalty scored) Kone; (penalty scored) Theophile Catherine; (penalty missed) Abenzoar

Stadio Guido Angelini, Chieti
Referee: Mauro Bergonzi (Italy)

==== Final ====
4 July 2009
21:00 CET

Italy	1–2	Spain
Mustacchio 89'	Report	Nsue 76'; Calderoni 90+5' (o.g.)

Stadio Adriatico, Pescara
Referee: Gamail Embaia (Libya)

== Final standings ==
Pos	Team	Pld	W	D	L	GF	GA	GD	Pts
1st place, gold medalist(s)	Spain	4	3	1	0	9	4	+5	10
2nd place, silver medalist(s)	Italy (H)	4	2	1	1	6	4	+2	7
3rd place, bronze medalist(s)	Libya	4	0	3	1	0	1	−1	3
4	France	4	2	1	1	4	2	+2	7
5	Greece	4	2	1	1	8	5	+3	7
6	Turkey	4	2	1	1	8	4	+4	7
7	Tunisia	4	2	1	1	6	5	+1	7
8	Montenegro	4	0	2	2	1	3	−2	2
9	Syria	2	0	1	1	1	5	−4	1
10	Albania	2	0	0	2	1	5	−4	0
11	Malta	2	0	0	2	0	6	−6	0

Source: RSSSF
(H) Hosts
