= Mattia Mustacchio =

Italian footballer (born 1989)

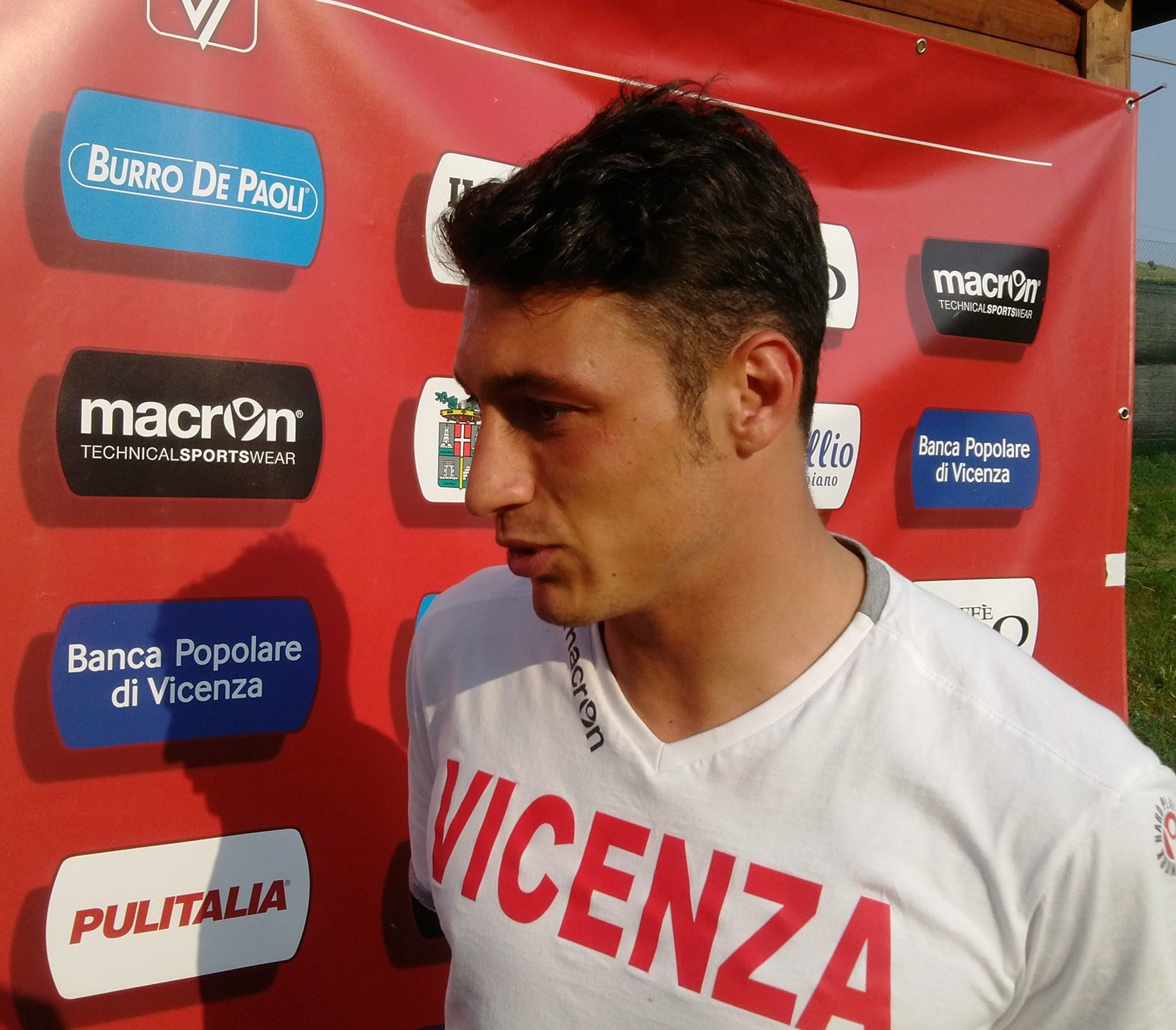
- Mattia Mustacchio

Personal information
- Full name: Mattia Mustacchio
- Date of birth: 17 May 1989 (age 37)
- Place of birth: Chiari, Italy
- Height: 1.80 m (5 ft 11 in)
- Position: Forward

Team information
- Current team: Piacenza

Youth career
- Brescia
- 2008–2009: Sampdoria

Senior career*
Years	Team	Apps	(Gls)
2009–2011	Sampdoria	5	(0)
2009–2010	→ Ancona (loan)	24	(0)
2010–2011	→ Varese (loan)	7	(0)
2011	→ Vicenza (loan)	14	(0)
2011–2014	Vicenza	69	(9)
2014–2015	Ascoli	34	(6)
2015–2017	Pro Vercelli	54	(10)
2017–2019	Perugia	60	(6)
2019	→ Carpi (loan)	11	(2)
2019–2021	Crotone	34	(3)
2021–2022	Alessandria	45	(1)
2022–2024	Pro Vercelli	50	(13)
2023	→ Cesena (loan)	11	(2)
2024–2025	AlbinoLeffe	37	(4)
2025–	Piacenza	0	(0)

International career
2006	Italy U17	3	(1)
2009	Italy U20	10	(5)
2009–2010	Italy U21	8	(1)
- * Club domestic league appearances and goals as of 25 April 2025

Mattia Mustacchio (born 17 May 1989) is an Italian footballer who plays for Piacenza as a forward.

== Club career ==
Mustacchio and Morris Donati were signed by Sampdoria on 31 January 2008 in co-ownership deal, for €700,000 and €300,000 respectively, as part of the deal that 50% registration of Andrea Caracciolo moved to opposite direction for €3.55 million. Mustacchio played his first Serie A match on 28 January 2009, a 3–1 victory against S.S. Lazio. He replaced Claudio Bellucci in the last minute. He played 5 Serie A matches, all as substitute. He also made his European debut on 26 February 2009, a 0–2 loss to FC Metalist Kharkiv; he came in for Marco Padalino in 82 minute. The match knocked Sampdoria out from the UEFA Cup.

In summer 2009 he left on loan to A.C. Ancona. Sampdoria bought Mustacchio outright on 26 June 2010 from Brescia. Both clubs failed to form an agreement before the deadline, however Brescia did not submit a bid to Lega Calcio, thus Sampdoria got Donati and Mustacchio for free.

He left on loan to Varese in July 2010.

=== Vicenza ===
In January 2011 his loan was terminated and he left for Vicenza, re-joining Alessandro Bastrini. Mustacchio wore no.9 shirt left by Mattia Minesso. In summer 2011 Vicenza signed Mustacchio in a new co-ownership deal for a peppercorn of €500.

In June 2012, after Vicenza relegated, the club decided to give up most of the co-ownership deal, including Bastrini and Mustacchio; however, Sampdoria also gave to its remain 50% registration rights of Bastrini and Mustacchio to Vicenza for free. Vicenza was re-admitted to Serie B on 23 August 2012.

In 2012–13 Serie B Mustacchio changed to wear no.8 which left by Alemão (also briefly owned by Marco Cellini and Rodrigo Possebon). At the end of season Vicenza was relegated again.

=== Ascoli ===
On 11 July 2014 he was signed by Ascoli in a 2+1 year contract.

=== Pro Vercelli ===
Mustacchio was sold to Pro Vercelli on 31 August 2015.

=== Perugia ===
On 24 January 2017 Mustacchio was signed by Perugia.

On 31 January 2019 he joined Carpi on loan until the end of the 2018–19 season.

=== Crotone ===
On 24 July 2019, he signed a 2-year contract with Crotone.

=== Alessandria ===
On 15 January 2021, he joined Alessandria on a 2.5-year contract.

=== Return to Pro Vercelli ===
On 20 July 2022, Mustacchio returned to Pro Vercelli. On 17 January 2023, he was loaned to Cesena.

=== AlbinoLeffe ===
On 1 August 2024, Mustacchio signed a one-season contract with AlbinoLeffe.

== International career ==
Mustacchio was selected to 2009 Mediterranean Games and 2009 FIFA U-20 World Cup for Italy national under-20 football team.

On 12 August 2009 he made his debut with the Italy U-21 squad in a friendly match against Russia. On 7 September 2010 he scored his first goal, in a qualification match against Wales in Pescara.
