= San Michele Arcangelo, Velletri =

Church in Velletri, Italy

Coordinates: 41°41′12″N 12°46′36″E

San Michele Arcangelo is a Neoclassical-style, Roman Catholic church located Piazza Cesare Ottaviano Augusto, 11, of Velletri, in the province of Rome, in Italy.

A church at the site was likely erected by the Lomards over the remains of an ancient temple dedicated to Mars. It has undergone numerous reconstructions. The high altar shelters a Crucifix (1703) by Filippo Zucchetti. Inside is a canvas depicting St Anna by Agostino Carracci, donated in 1626 by the notary Zeffiro Velli.
