= San Martino, Velletri =

Church in Velletri, Italy

Coordinates: 41°41′09″N 12°46′42″E

San Martino Vescovo is a Roman Catholic church located in the historic center of Velletri, in the province of Rome, in Italy.

A church at the site is mentioned in a bull from 1065 from Pope Alexander II. The church was assigned to the Somaschi Fathers in 1616 by Pope Paul V. Over the centuries, the church has undergone reconstruction. Under the Somaschi, it was rebuilt in 1772 to 1778 with the facade completed in 1825. The altarpiece of the Madonna with Child was brought here in 1817 from the abandoned Monastery of Santa Maria dell’Orto.
