= Antonio Mancinelli =

- Born: 1452-12-06
- Occupation: grammarian
- Known for: Enseignant, humaniste de la Renaissance

Antonio Mancinelli (6 December 1452 – 1505) was a humanist pedagogue, grammarian, and rhetorician from Velletri who taught in Venice, Rome, and Orvieto. He produced editions of Cicero, Herodotus, Horace, Juvenal, Suetonius, Virgil, and many other authors. His Carmen de Figuris rendered parts of Quintilian's rhetoric in hexameter.

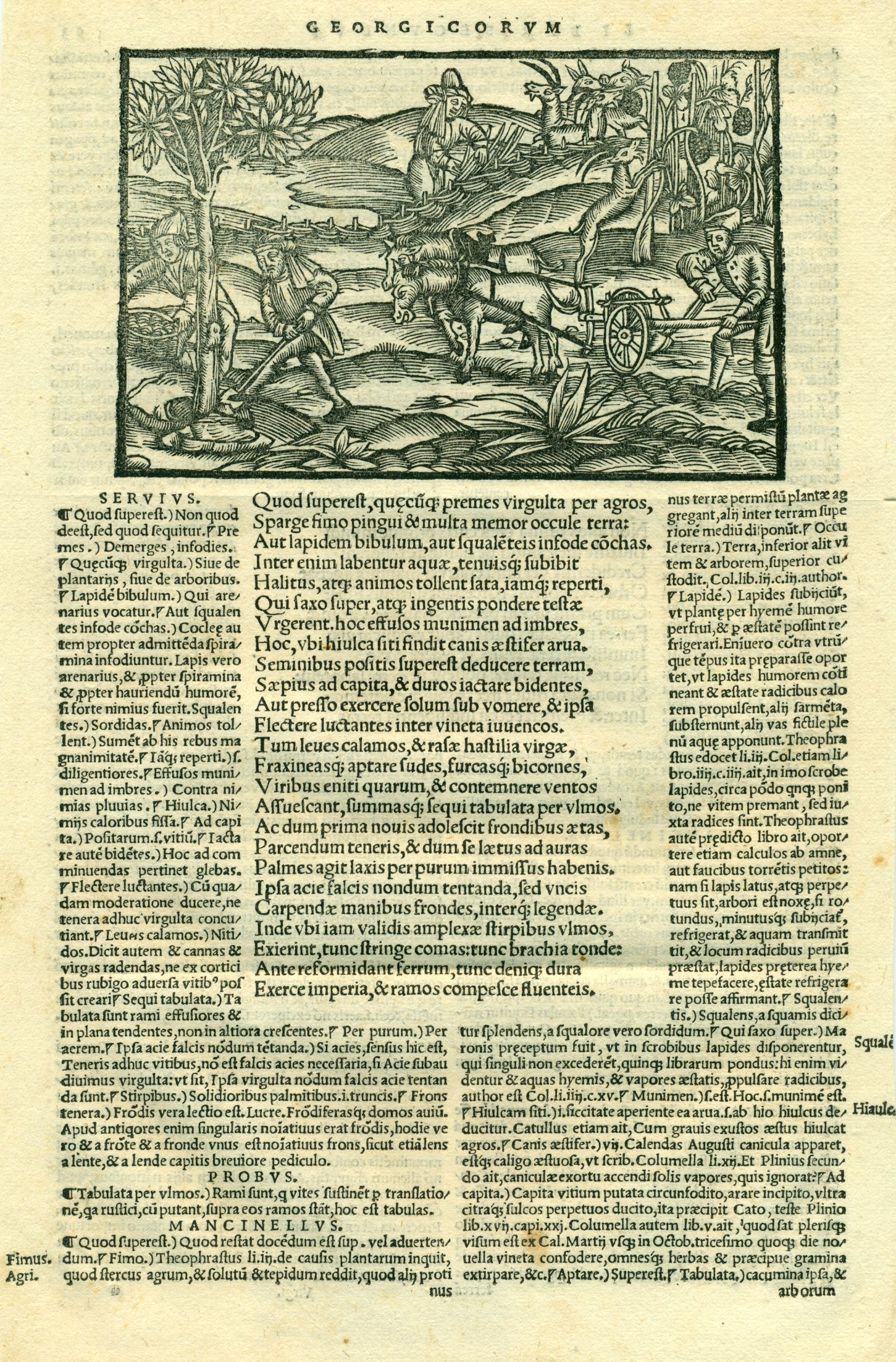
Bucolica, Georgica, et Aeneis, Servii Mauri Honorati & Aelii Donati commentariis illustrata (Basel 1544) with the commentary of Mancinelli (Mancinellus) printed next to the text.

By 1473, he had opened a humanistic school in Velletri. He died in Rome.

== Bibliography ==
- M.E. Cosenza, Biographical and Bibliographical Dictionary of the Italian Humanists..., Boston, 1962. (not seen)
