= Pagliarini =

Pagliarini is an Italian surname. Notable people with the surname include:

- Alice Pagliarini (born/ 2006), Italian sprinter
- Giancarlo Pagliarini (born 1942), Italian politician
- Luciano Pagliarini (born 1978), Brazilian cyclist
- Mirko Pagliarini (born 1975), Italian footballer
- Robert Pagliarini, American financial planner and writer
- Silvano Pagliarini (born 1950), Italian amateur astronomer
  - 120040 Pagliarini, a minor planet named after Silvano
