= Velletri Sarcophagus =

2nd-century archaeological artifact

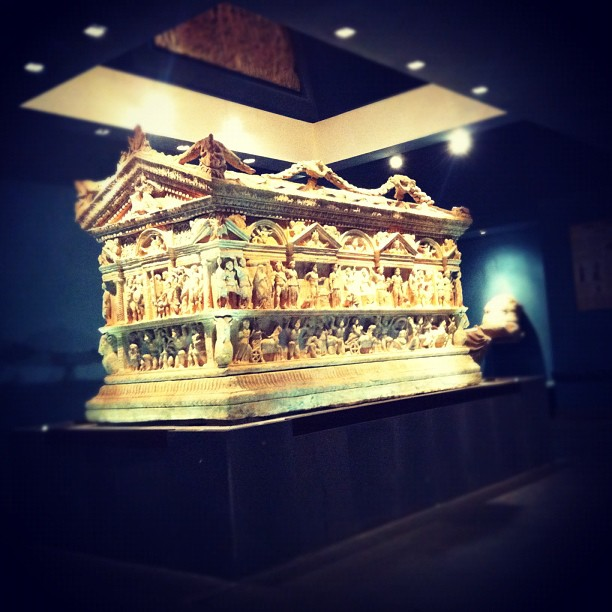
Velletri Sarcophagus

The Velletri Sarcophagus is a Roman sarcophagus from 140–150 CE, displaying Greek and possible Asiatic influence. It features Hercules and other pagan deities framed by columned registers of classic spiral-fluted Doric and Ionic columnar styles, creating a theatrical border around the figures. It was created shortly after the Roman conversion to burial practice when Romans went from using cremation to burying their dead, due to new ideas of an afterlife. It is currently housed in the Civic Archaeological Museum of Velletri.

== Form ==
The Velletri Sarcophagus was made from marble (even though the marble sarcophagi would not become popular until the 3rd century) and decorated in a high relief. It is 8.5 ft (2.6 m) long, 4.9 ft (1.5 m) high, and 4.1 ft (1.2 m) wide. Most of the sarcophagus has kept its fine detail, however there has been some erosion in figures, leaving them to be more mysterious, and the right side panel of the roof is gone.

== Content ==
At first glance the sarcophagus is filled with characterless, vaguely faced figures dancing and acting a narrative amongst the theatrical setting. However, these figures each have a name, a story, and a meaning. There are a total of 86 human and divine figures (including Caryatids and Telamons), 43 mythical creatures, and 40 animals. All deities or heroes represent life after death, indicating the object's purpose. Those that appear include the gods of Olympus, Pluto, Persephone, Cerberus, Hades, Neptune, Jupiter, Mercury, Admetus, Protesilaos, Alcestis, and, most importantly, Hercules. The elaborate decoration of the pediments and columns adds to the stage-like setting.

The Front Long View displays more action and movement. The addition of chariots adds to this effect. Strong, atlas-like Telamon figures are found on all sides of the bottom register, wrapped around the sarcophagus (minus the corners, where there are bull heads), supporting the rest of the structure. In the center of the main register sits Pluto, or Hades, enthroned next to Persephone. The creature Cerberus sits to the right of the two, identifying Pluto. Adjacent to the enthroned are a nude Neptune carrying a dolphin and Jupiter with his lightning bolt standing with their back to doors from which the face of Medusa protrudes. Other happenings on that register include deliverance from Pluto. On the left a covered woman figure emerges from behind a door, being led by Mercury. This scene looks similar to the story of Protesilaos' visit to hell out of her grief for Laodamia. The right shows the deliverance of Alcestis by Hercules, similarly emerging from a door. This story is common in sarcophagi, particularly when a wife had died before her husband. The lower register displays the Rape of Persephone. The scene is flooded with chariots, and on the left end is a small group of maidens caught in the middle of the action. They are known as the group of Minerva. To the right of the central rape is the mouth of a cave, opened and swallowing an unidentified woman.

The Back Long View features a frieze in the main register of the 'Labours of Hercules'. The left end presents Hercules (separated by a column) and the Erymanthian Boar with Eurystheus and his pot. Next, Hercules is found in combat with the Cyreneian Stag; the form they are presented in is reminiscent of depictions of Mithras slaying the bull Tauroctony. This face is highly eroded, but it is presumed that Hercules is seen walking away from the viewer while holding a (better preserved) lion's skin. The next scene shows the Amazonian queen Hippolyta being dragged across the floor by Hercules to obtain her golden girdle. The next scene is thought to be of Hercules cleaning the Augean Stables. Another eroded scene displays Hercules taking the Cretan Bull by the horns. Finally the register's narratives end with the hero with the horses of Diomedes. Hercules stands faceless (because of erosion) in front of two jumping horses, trying to control them. The lower register shows to the left two women pick fruit from a tree. The rest of the register shows scenes from the underworld. To the right of them two women, separate by a kneeling Atlas, is Sisyphus holding a boulder. In the center rows Charon's boat. To the right of Charon is Tantalus, represented as a naked figure standing up to his knees in water. He appears to be raising his hands to his mouth as if to attempt to drink. On the far end stands three Danaides, daughters of Danaus, holding pitchers and standing around a cauldron, as they are commonly depicted.

The Right Side View with broken roof exhibits the same relief as expected. At the left in the main register are Hercules and the lion, where his arm seems to thrust into the lions mouth. In the center are two unknown men, one older and one younger, in his prime. According to the scholars Lawrence and Baroccinni, who closely studied the sarcophagus, they may be the Deceased and the Ancestor. The right end shows Hercules and the (Medusa-esque) Hydra, where the hero has grabbed the creature and is about to take it out as he swings his club over his head. On the bottom kneels the Telamon figures with a procession of sacrifice, where two bulls are led and men wear traditional clothing, one with an ax.

The Left Side View with the whole, elaborate pediment and decor exhibit more labors on the main register. Hercules and the three-headed warrior Geryon are on the left. The center shows Hercules dragging Cerberus out at the gate of hell. The last scene is of a heroic Hercules and the Apples of Hesperides. Hercules stands in confidence with his lion's skin. He reaches for fruit from a tree with a snake wrapped around the trunk. On the bottom once again kneel the Telamon figures in a pastoral scene.

The Roof has large pediments decorated with marble, snake-like garlands of fruit sculpted in the round and carried by cupids. The botanic garland addition is common in sarcophagi and is influenced by the tradition of decorating tombs with herbaceous decor; however, most garlands are carved in a relief, making the Velletri sarcophagus more original with its three dimensional decor.

== Function ==
The act of burying and the use of sarcophagi was a new form of honoring the dead for Romans starting in the 2nd century. The new tradition, however, was more for those who could afford such an elaborate form of burial. The only viewers at the time that truly interacted with it were the loved ones of the deceased. Their interaction consisted only of knowing that the deceased had a comfortable final resting place in the afterworld. This follows the concept of the tomb being a house, and true "palace of the dead." The Velletri Sarcophagus looks strikingly similar to the Junius Bassus Sarcophagus in its size, material, architectural form, and even stances of the figures, however Velletri's can be easily identified by the roof's garland decoration. These similarities as well as the fact of the Junius Bassus sarcophagus being made two centuries after the Velletri shows that whoever was encased within was of high importance and social status.

== Context ==
The sarcophagus was found in Velletri, near Rome, Italy, and was created during the Antonine dynasty. Burial, instead of cremation, became particularly popular after Hadrian's death in 138 CE, creating a sharp shift in how Romans honored their dead. It is associated with new ideas of life after death, deriving from growing cults and religions. As for the influences for visual elements, both the gabled roof and the protective layers of marble around the dead lead scholars to believe that the sarcophagus is more of an Asiatic or Greek tradition, rather than Roman. Its architectural style and roof-like lid show that it may be influenced by a sculpture school in Asia Minor; both elements are common features from that school. Others believe that the added elements of Ionic capitols and palmettes disprove the theory of Asiatic influence.
