= Lago di Giulianello =

Lake in Lazio, Italy

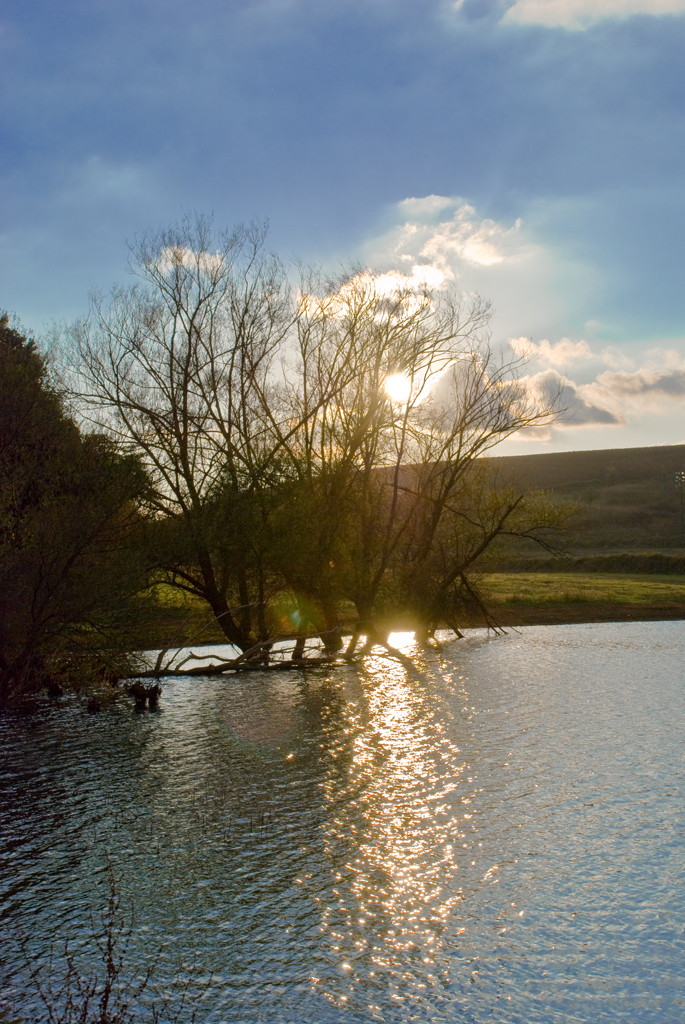

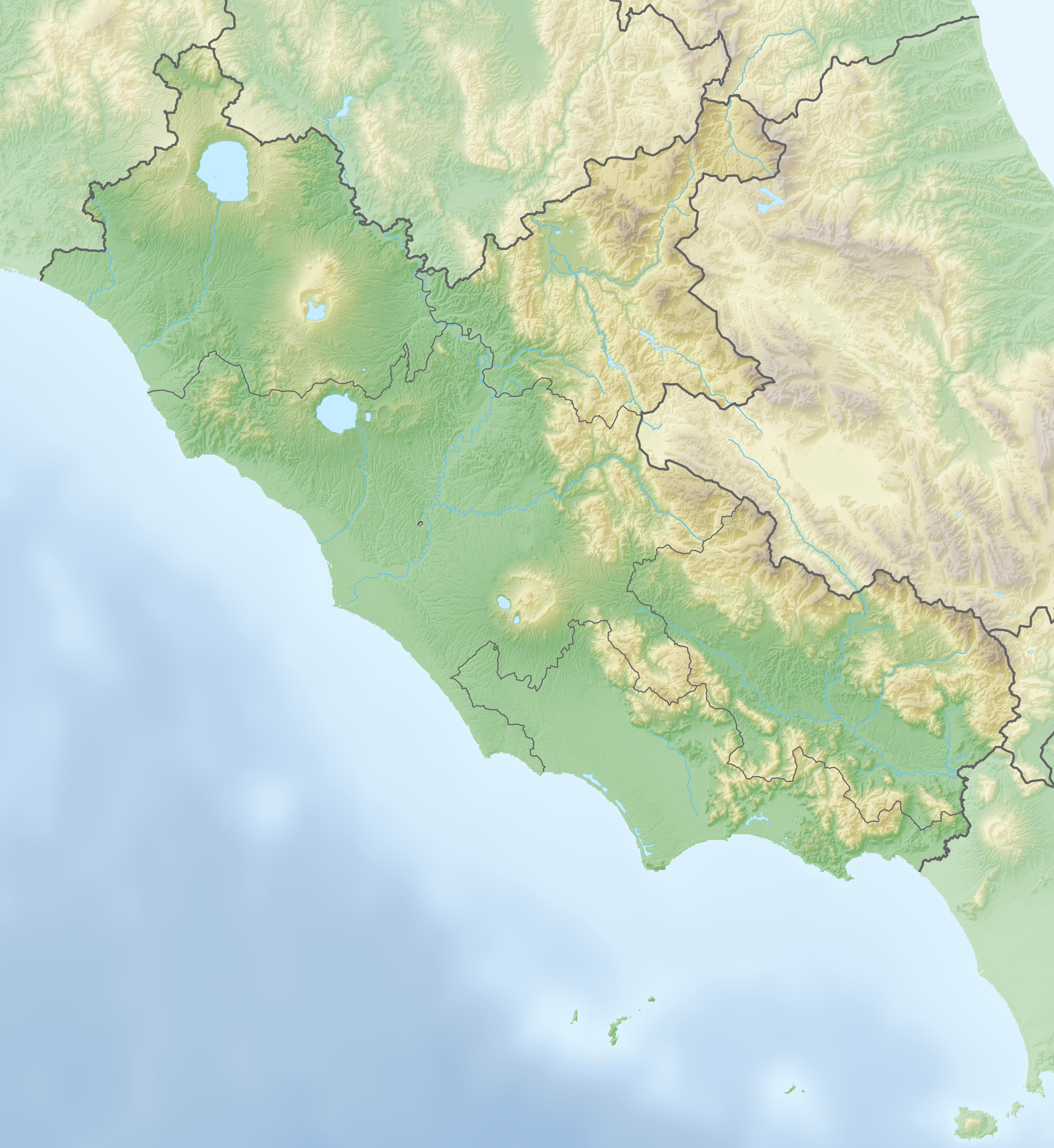
- Location within Lazio Location within Italy
- Location: Province of Latina, Lazio
- Coordinates: 41.7°N 12.85°E
- Basin countries: Italy
- Surface area: 0.12 km^{2} (0.046 sq mi)
- Surface elevation: 235 m (771 ft)

Lago di Giulianello is a lake located in the territory of Giulianello, an enclave of imperial Rome, part of the municipalities of Cori, and stretches in the provinces of Latina and Roma, in the Lazio region, in central Italy. The lake is actually part of two municipalities, Artena and Cori, at an elevation of 235m and with a surface area of 0.12 km².

The lake and its surroundings have been declared a protected natural monument in 2007.

Links:

https://www.parchilazio.it/giulianello
