= Mirko Pagliarini =

Italian footballer

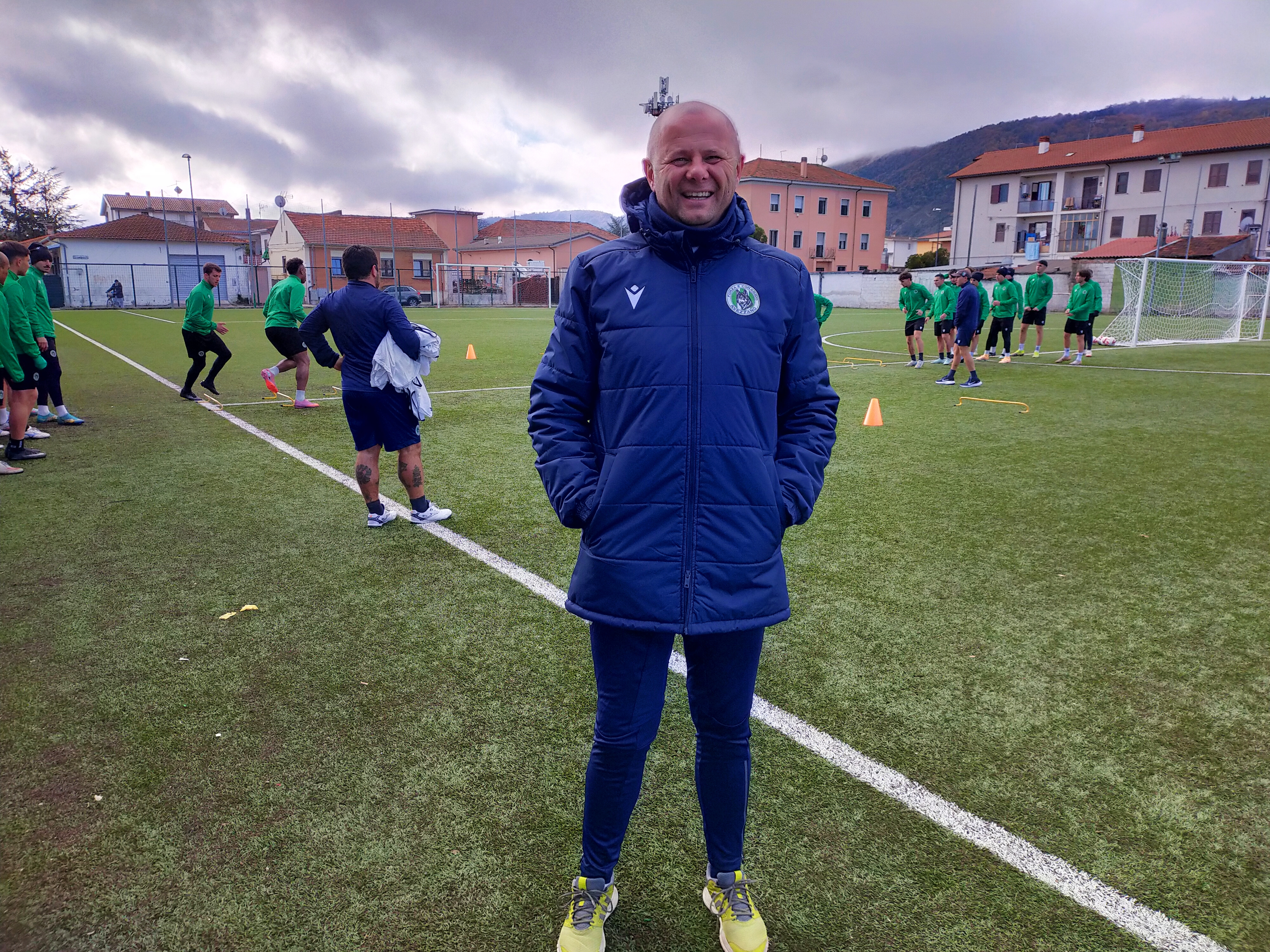
- Mister Pagliarini (Avezzano, 2025)

Personal information
- Date of birth: 28 October 1975 (age 51)
- Place of birth: Velletri, Italy
- Height: 1.83 m (6 ft 0 in)
- Position: Striker

Senior career*
| Years | Team | Apps | (Gls) |
| 1994–1996 | Genoa | 22 | (2) |
| 1996–1997 | Saronno | 23 | (0) |
| 1997 | Genoa | 1 | (0) |
| 1997–1998 | Pisa | 19 | (5) |
| 1998–1999 | Avellino | 27 | (0) |
| 1999–2000 | Atletico Catania | 28 | (2) |
| 2000–2005 | Crotone | 98 | (5) |
| 2005–2006 | Viterbese | 29 | (2) |
| 2006–2010 | Virtus Lanciano | 26 | (1) |
| 2010–2011 | Narnese | | |

Managerial career
- 2015–2018: Udinese (youth)
- 2018–2019: Rieti (youth)
- 2019–2022: Ternana (U17)
- 2022–2023: A S D. Città di Rieti
- 2024-2025: Avezzano
- 2025-2026: Forza e Coraggio Avezzano
- * Club domestic league appearances and goals

Mirko Pagliarini (born 28 October 1975) is an Italian professional football coach and a former player.

He played one game in the Serie A in the 1994–95 season for Genoa.
