= Lariano =

- Comune
- Comune di Lariano
- Coat of arms

- Location within Italy Location within Lazio
- Coordinates: 41°44′N 12°50′E
- Country: Italy
- Region: Lazio
- Metropolitan city: Rome (RM)

Government
  - Mayor: Maurizio Caliciotti

Area
  - Total: 27 km^{2} (10 sq mi)
- Elevation: 358 m (1,175 ft)

Population (31 August 2017)
  - Total: 13,507
  - Density: 500/km^{2} (1,300/sq mi)
- Demonym: Larianesi
- Time zone: UTC+1 (CET)
  - Summer (DST): UTC+2 (CEST)
- Postal code: 00040
- Dialing code: +39 06
- Patron saint: St. Eurosia
- Saint day: 25 May
- Website: Official website

Lariano is a comune (municipality) in the Metropolitan City of Rome Capital, in the Italian region of Lazio, located about 35 kilometres (22 mi) southeast of Rome on the Alban Hills.

== Twin towns ==
- Victoria, Romania, since April 2007
- Sausset-les-Pins, France
- Crecchio, Italy
- San Ferdinando di Puglia, Italy
