= Stadio dei Marsi =

Coordinates: 42°1′48″N 13°25′12″E

Stadio dei Marsi-Sandro Cimarra
- Stadio bianco-verde
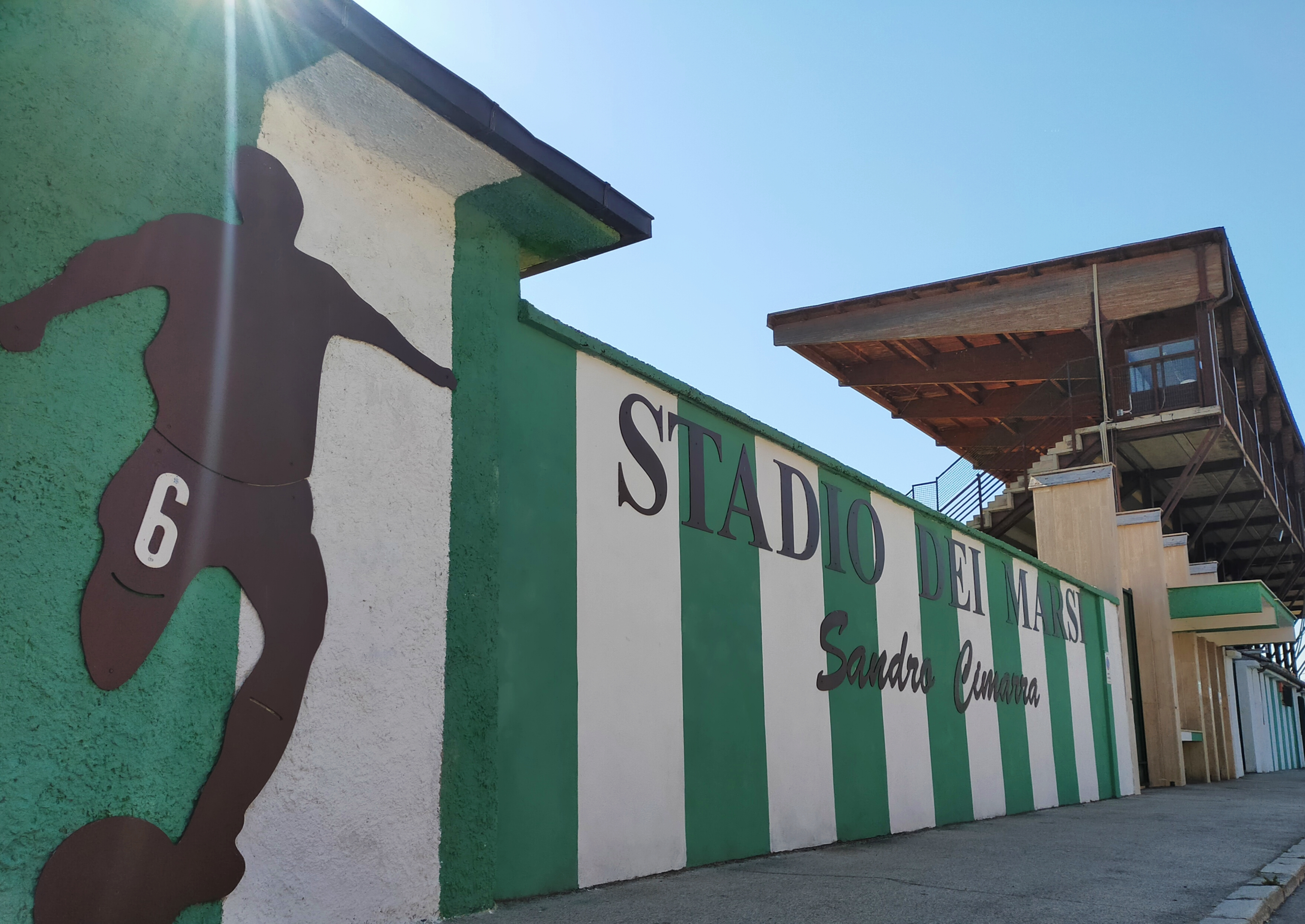
- Interactive map of Stadio dei Marsi-Sandro Cimarra
- Location: Avezzano, Italy
- Owner: Municipality of Avezzano
- Capacity: 3,692
- Surface: Grass

Tenant
- Avezzano Calcio

Stadio dei Marsi-Sandro Cimarra is a stadium in the Via Napoli ("Naples Street") neighbourhood of Avezzano, Italy. It was built between the years '30 and '50. In the past it was used for athletics events and there was a tennis court, it is currently used mostly for football matches and is the home ground of Avezzano Calcio. The stadium holds 3,692. It named after the ancient population of Marsi and the historic captain of the green and white team, Sandro (Giuseppe) Cimarra.

== Bibliography ==
- Del Gusto, Federico (1995). Avezzano, un secolo di sport (in Italian). Avezzano: Di Censo editore.
