= Forza e Coraggio Avezzano =

Italian football club

- Full name: Forza e Coraggio Avezzano A.S.D.
- Nicknames: Marsicani (The Marsicans), Lupi (The Marsicans wolves), Biancoverdi (The green and whites)
- Founded: 1919; 107 years ago as Forza e Coraggio Avezzano F.C. 1932 (refounded); 1985 (refounded); 1998 (refounded); 2009 (refounded); 2025 (refounded)
- Ground: Stadio dei Marsi-Sandro Cimarra
- Capacity: 3,692
- Chairman: Luca Marco Aurelio
- Coach: Mirko Pagliarini
- League: None
- 2023–24: Serie D Group F, 3th of 18
Home colours	Away colours	Third colours

Forza e Coraggio Avezzano A.S.D., commonly known as Avezzano (pronounced [avetˈtsaːno] or [avedˈdzaːno]), is an Italian football club based in Avezzano, Abruzzo.

== History ==
The club was founded in 1919 and refounded in 1998 and 2009. In 1996–1997 it played in Serie C1, the highest level reached by the team.

=== Nuova Avezzano ===
Following financial problems, in 2009 Nuova Avezzano Calcio tried to merge with the newly promoted to Serie C2 A.S. Pescina Valle del Giovenco. When the merging was denied by the Lega Calcio Serie C, the club folded and sold its sport rights to A.S.D. Luco Canistro.

In 2010/2011 Pescina, that is playing in Avezzano's pitch since his field is ineligible for Lega Pro, will be anyway renamed into Avezzano Valle del Giovenco.

=== The refoundation ===
In 2009 the club was refounded as A.S.D. Avezzano Foce Nuova that in the season 2010–11 was promoted to Promozione Abruzzo. In the summer 2011 it was renamed with the current name. The team plays in the serie D.

== Colors and badge ==
The old logo used between 2015 and 2023.

The old logo used in 2023.

The historic crest of Avezzano Calcio is a simple Gothic-style shield, vertically divided into white and green halves, topped with the club's name "Avezzano" in uppercase letters. From 1990 to 1998, starting with the Mauro Gentile era, the club used a redesigned logo featuring stylized green initials "A" and "C" placed at the center of the white shield. In 1997, under the presidency of Vincenzo Angeloni, the italian wolf, a symbol of the club, was replaced by the Marsican brown bear, shown upright and facing forward within the white and green badge.

From 2000 to 2007, the crest of the rebranded Nuova Avezzano Calcio featured a football in the center of the badge, with the profile of a wolf's head at the base. In 2011, a new design by Roberto Falco introduced a snarling, stylized white wolf set against a green background symbolizing the Fucino plain. The Gothic shield also depicted the peaks of Mount Velino, with the club's name "Avezzano Calcio" written in uppercase above.

In 2023, the club unveiled a new circular crest in white and green, bordered in gold. At the center sits a stylized, front-facing wolf's head, topped by the words "Avezzano Calcio" in block letters and the initials "AZ"—a nod to the Marsica region's push for autonomy. The foundation year, 1919, is inscribed at the bottom.

== Honours ==
- Coppa Italia Dilettanti
  - Champions: 1986–87 (as Avezzano Calcio)

== Notable players ==
Player with 100 appearances

- (Italy) Alessandro Del Grosso

Italy internationals

- (Italy) Giuseppe Pancaro
