= Robert Pagliarini =

American writer and businessman

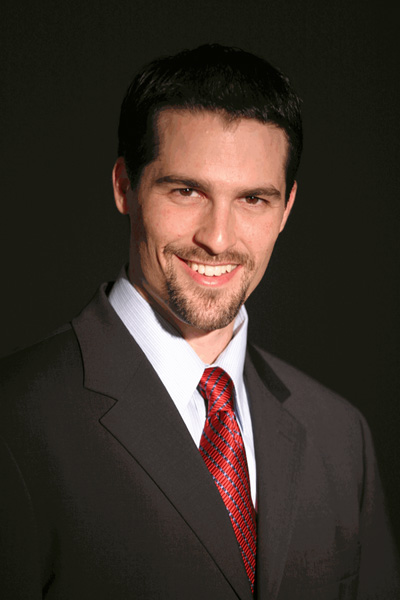
Robert Pagliarini, MS, MA, EA, CDFA, CFP

Robert Pagliarini is a partner at Beacon Pointe Advisors, has earned a PhD in financial and retirement planning, is a certified financial planner, an enrolled agent with the IRS and the best-selling author of The Six-Day Financial Makeover: Transform Your Financial Life in Less Than a Week. He is a financial columnist for CBS MoneyWatch, The Huffington Post, Business Insider, AOL, Tribune Media Services and Forbes.

As a partner at Beacon Pointe Advisors, Pagliarini specializes in retirement planning and serving sudden wealth recipients and helping clients overcome sudden wealth syndrome.

Pagliarini has appeared as a financial advisor on 20/20, Good Morning America, Dr. Phil, ABC Morning News, NBC and NPR's Marketplace. In print, he has appeared in The Wall Street Journal, Newsweek, BusinessWeek and Money magazine.

In addition to his best-selling title, Pagliarini is also the author of Get Money Smart: Simple Lessons to Kickstart Your Financial Confidence & Grow Your Wealth, The Sudden Wealth Solution, The Other 8 Hours: Maximize Your Time to Create New Wealth and Purpose, and Plan Z: How to Survive the 2009 Financial Crisis (and even live a little better).

Pagliarini has a PhD in financial and retirement planning from The American College. He graduated in 1995 from Washington State University, with a bachelor's degree (BA) in Psychology. In 1999, he graduated from University of California, Los Angeles (UCLA) with certification in Personal Financial Planning. In 2004, Pagliarini completed his education at The American College, PA with a master's degree (MA) in Financial Services. In 2012 he earned a second master's degree – an MS degree in psychology – and in 2019 he earned a PhD.

Pagliarini currently resides in Mission Viejo, CA, with his wife and daughter.
