= History of KF Tirana =

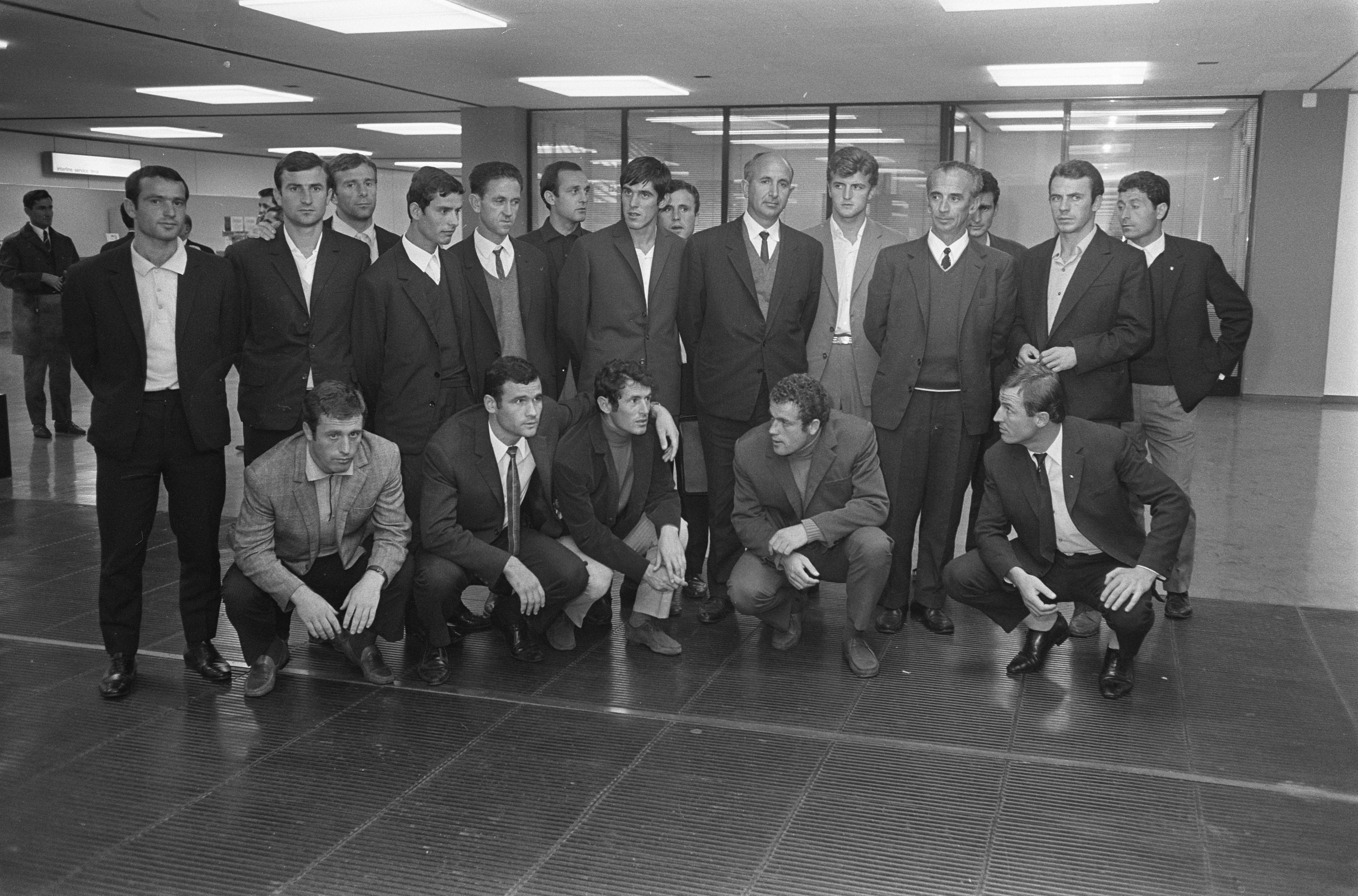
KF Tirana squad in September 1970.

KF Tirana (Albanian: Klubi i Futbollit Tirana) is an Albanian men's football club in the Albanian Superliga, and based in Tirana. The club, part of the multidisciplinary sports club SK Tirana, is the most successful in Albania, having won 51 recognized major domestic titles. They play their home games at the Selman Stërmasi Stadium in Tirana.

== 1920–1929: Early years ==
Football enthusiast and journalist Palokë Nika had already formed Vllaznia Shkodër, then on 15 August 1920 he started to train a new team in Tirana, Sportklub Tirona, with: A. Erebara (capitan), P. Jakova, A. Hoxha, Anastas Koja, P. Berisha, Avni Zajmi, H. Fortuzi, B. Pazari, L. Berisha, S. Frasheri, H. Alizoti, A. Gjitomi, and V. Fekeci. The captain was Erebara. After a few months the name changed to Futboll Klub Tirona. The club was multidisciplinary, but football was emphasised. In October 1920, the club played its inaugural FSHF sanctioned match at Shallvare in the centre of Tirana against Juventus Shkodër, a team with players from Bashkimi Shkodran, modern day Vllaznia Shkodër, led by its captain Palokë Nika.

In 1925, the association's governing council was elected and its members were Avni Zajmi, Selman Stërmasi, B. Toptani, Irfan Gjinali and Anastas Koja. Shortly after, in the same year, the club played its first international match against Yugoslav team Crnogorac Cetinje from Montenegro. On 16 August 1927, which was the seventh anniversary of the formation of the Agimi Sports Association, the club's name changed to Sportklub Tirana, which would be commonly referred to as SK Tirana. On that day the club's president was Teki Selenica.

== 1930–1937: Domestic dominance ==
With the formation of the Albanian Football Association on 6 June 1930 came the first officially recognised football competition held in Albania. This was the 1930 National Championship, for which SK Tirana had enrolled. The club reached the championship final after winning five games, drawing four and losing just one, to finish joint top with Skënderbeu Korçë, albeit with a slightly better goal difference. The championship final games against Skënderbeu Korçë were scheduled to be played on 26 June and 6 July respectively, but Skënderbeu Korçë forfeited both games by refusing to play. The team was protesting against the bias of the competition and the Albanian Football Association towards SK Tirana. SK Tirana was awarded both games 2–0, and were thus crowned champions of Albania for the first time. The winning team consisted of: Rudolf Gurashi, Abdullah Shehri, Irfan Gjinali, Xhelal Kashari, Vasil Kajano, Gjon Sabati, Llazar Miha, Mark Gurashi, Bexhet Jolldashi, Shefqet Ndroqi, Isuf Dashi, Adem Karapici, Hysen Kusi, Mustafa Begolli, Hilmi Kosova, Emil Hajnali, Rexhep Maçi, and Selman Stërmasi (as player-manager). Maçi and Hainali also won the inaugural golden boot for being the joint top goal scorers with three goals each. As a multi-disciplinary club, this was the second national championship that Tirana won, as the athletics team had already won the national championship in 1929. The team was received by Zog of Albania, and is, still to this day the only Albanian team to have been received by a monarch.

The following season the club brought former Fenerbahçe goalkeeper Vasfi Samimi onto the team. He had represented Sportklub Vlorë the previous season. Other players, such as Sabit Çoku, Muhamet Agolli and Halim Begeja joined the club as well. The Albanian Football Association decided to alter the format of the championship and divided the teams into two groups, with Tirana being placed in Group A along with Sportklub Vlorë and Bashkimi Shkodran. They played four games, winning two, drawing one and losing one, to finish top of the group level on points with Bashkimi Shkodran but still won the group due to a superior goal difference. The club met Group B winners Teuta Durrës in the championship final, managing a 1–1 draw at home at Shallvare. Tirana had opened the scoring and taken the lead with a Mark Gurashi goal, before Teuta Durrës' goalkeeper Niko Dovana instructed one of the forwards to cover for him in goal as he went to play as a forward. With a shot on goal he scored and equalised. His goal led to mass media coverage, with many Albanian football fans fascinated by the sight of the goalkeeper playing as a forward and scoring. Tirana complained to the Albanian Football Association on the grounds that a registered goalkeeper cannot play as an outfield player, but these complaints were ignored and the second leg of the tie was played a week later on 5 July 1931 in Durrës. Tirana won comfortably 3–0 to win 4–1 on aggregate, regaining the National Championship.

The Albanian Football Association once again changed the format of the championship and opted for a five team league format, where every club would play each other twice. The winner would be the league's top-finishing team, not a championship winner. SK Tirana went unbeaten throughout the season, with five wins and three draws to their name, including 6–0 wins over Urani Elbasan and Teuta Durrës respectively and a 9–2 away win against Urani Elbasan. The club were crowned Albanian champions for a third consecutive season, which further cemented their place in history as the first club to dominate football in Albania.

The 1933 National Championship proved to be less fruitful for the club, as they missed out on a fourth consecutive title, finishing in third place out of six, behind Bashkimi Shkodran and the winners Skënderbeu Korçë. However, they bounced back in the 1934 National Championship, finishing five points ahead of runners-up Skënderbeu Korçë in a seven team format. They won a total of ten games out of twelve, which included 9–0 wins over Teuta Durrës and Bashkimi Elbasanas respectively, as well as an 8–0 win over Sportklub Vlorë, with Mark Gurashi being named the top goalscorer with 12 goals. The following year there was no official competition held by the Albanian Football Association, so only friendly games were played.

In 1936 the National Championship returned and SK Tirana regained their title with a two-point difference ahead of runners-up Vllaznia Shkodër. The ethnic-Albanian forward from Yugoslavia Riza Lushta was the top goalscorer with 11 goals scored in the campaign. The following season the club once again won the National Championship, with Vllaznia Shkodër coming in second place, and Riza Lushta being named the top goalscorer, this time with a record 25 goals.< This was the last pre-World War II competition held by the Albanian Football Association as there was no championship held in 1938 and World War II broke out in 1939.

== 1939–1944: Interwar period ==
In 1939, following the Italian invasion of Albania, a national football tournament was held featuring eight of the country's best clubs at the time including SK Tirana. Under the fascist rule of Victor Emmanuel III, king of the Albanian Kingdom, sports activities in the country were revamped to mirror the systems in place in Italy. Giovanni Giro, a trustee of Foreign Minister Galeazzo Ciano, was in charge of organising the first football competition under Victor Emmanuel III, which was called Turneja Kombëtare E Footbollit Për Ndeshjet E Trofeut Të Liktorit (lang:en|National Tour of Football for the Matches of the Lictor Trophy). In the first round of the tournament, SK Tirana met Dragoj Pogradeci, whom they defeated 7–0 in the first leg. Zyber Lisi opened the scoring in the seventh minute, after which Naim Kryeziu netted five goals in the eighth, 35th, 68th, 81st and 89th minutes. Zyber Lisi found the net once again in the 85th minute. SK Tirana's starting formation for the game consisted of previous championship winners: Rudolf Gurashi, Sllave Llambi, Foto Janku, Hasan Maluçi, Hasan Balla, Zyber Lisi, Haki Korça, Naim Kryeziu and Mark Gurashi. Tirana defeated Dragoj Pogradeci in the second leg as well 2–0, winning 9–0 on aggregate and thus reached the semifinals against Skënderbeu Korçë, in a match played on 6 August 1939. Mark Gurashi scored the opening goal of the game within 10 minutes, as SK Tirana went on to win 3–0 to reach the final against Vllaznia Shkodër on 30 September 1939. The final was played at the Shallvare field in Tirana, in the presence of many important figures in the National Fascist Party, as well as important Albanian nobleman, and other notables including: Eqrem Vlora, Aleksandër Xhuvani, Anton Harapi, Dhimitër Beratti and Karl Gurakuqi. Tirana won the final 6-5 and the championship trophy.

The ruling fascist regime organised a similar competition in 1940, this time in a group format where teams were divided into two groups based on geographical location. Two of the club's players from Kosovo had left Albania for Italy to join Bari and Roma. They met Vllaznia Shkodër on 17 March in a memorable game which ended in a 2–2 draw. The fans left the ground at Shallvare following two stoppages due to players and staff fighting. The game had started with Skënder Gjinali opening the scoring in the 10th minute for Vllaznia, following an assist by Frederik Shkjezi. Vasif Biçaku then equalised four minutes later, before Zyber Lisi gave Sportklub Tirana the lead in the 40th minute from a Skënder Begeja cross. However, Vllaznia levelled the score just 60 seconds later through Met Vasija, following a combination of Muç Koxhja, Loro Boriçi and the goalscorer Vasija. On 31 March they met Elbasani at Shallvare in a game which saw the home side go 3–0 down after goals by Progri, Shefqet Lamçja and Kasapi in the 30th, 48th and 56th minute respectively. Sportklub Tirana then scored a free kick by Vasif Biçaku in the 60th minute, to begin a comeback which saw three goals in three minutes, before Zyber Lisi scored the winner in the 85th minute. Vllaznia finished top of the group ahead of Sportklub Tirana, however, and reached the championship finals, where they defeated Skënderbeu Korçë 11–1 on aggregate to win their first national championship, to this day unrecognized by the Albanian Federal Association.

There was no competition held in 1941, but on 21 April of the same year the foreign ministers of Italy and Germany met in Vienna and concluded that most of Kosovo should join Albania to become what was known as the Kingdom of Albania under Victor Emmanuel III. In 1942 the national championship was held with the inclusion of three clubs from Kosovo, Prizreni, Peja and KF Prishtina. The clubs from Kosovo competed in the northern section along with the reigning champions Vllaznia Shkodër. Sportklub Tirana competed in the new middle section group, and the southern clubs competed in their own group. In an odd ruling, only players born between 1921 and 1925 were allowed to participate in the competition, meaning that only players between the ages of 17 and 22 were allowed to play. However, this rule was not followed by most clubs and senior players did participate in the competition. Another rule was that all participants had to members of one of the youth fascist groups, but this was merely a formality as many players who were anti-fascist competed. Tirana defeated Elbasani 5–1 and drew 1–1 with Teuta Durrës to reach the semi-final against Prizreni. It was played in Tirana over two legs on 26 and 27 June. During the first leg, Zyber Lisi opened the scoring through a 21st-minute penalty before doubling the lead just seven minutes later. Former SK Tirana player Skender Gjinali then scored for Prizreni on the 30th minute before Hasani equalised on the 81st minute and sent the game into extra time. A winner could not be decided which led to a replay the following day. The scoring in the replay was opened by Akil Derani in the 17th minute, with Zyber Lisi scoring a minute later to make it 2–0 for SK Tirana. Skender Gjinali scored a conciliation goal for Prizreni in the 76th minute, but they could not equalise, and SK Tirana reached the final against Shkodra on 29 June. The final was played at the Shallvare. Shyqyri Bylyku opened the scoring for SK Tirana in the 65th minute before Pali equalised in the 90th minute. Italian referee Michele Carone then asked both sides to play extra time of two 15 minute halves. Shkodra refused to continue play without a concrete reason, although it has been suggested that the darkness was one of the reasons. Two days after the final had been played the match was awarded 2–0 to SK Tirana along with the title.

The club won two out of the three National Championships held during World War II, with the other championship being won by Vllaznia Shkodër in 1940. The Albanian Football Association (AFA) finally made a decision in February 2013 that although the WWII Championships were played correctly and rightfully, are not legitimate and will not be recognised because they were not organised by the AFA but by the Fascist regime.

This decision contradicts the fact that the AFA has officially recognized the King's Cup in February 1939 and KF Tirana as winner. The Cup matches concluded just few months prior to the 1939 championship start and AFA were in full charge and control of all sport activities.

== 1944–1957: Postwar period ==
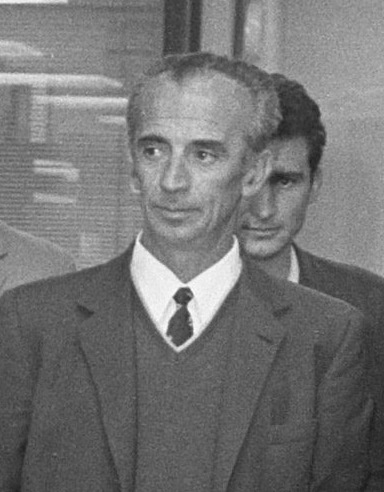
Myslym Alla, served for Tirana as a player and manager.

Following the end of World War II, Albania fell into the hands of the socialist dictator Enver Hoxha, and footballing activities resumed as they had done before the war under the guidance of the Albanian Football Association. The first championship held was in 1945 and Tirana were placed in Group B along with a short-lived military team under the name of Ylli, Bashkimi Elbasanas, Skënderbeu Korçë, Apolonia Fier, and Shqiponja Gjirokastër. Tirana reached the finals, after finishing top of the group with 16 points, seven wins, two draws and one loss. In the first leg of the finals on 23 December Tirana met Vllaznia Shkodër, losing 2–1, but Vasif Biçaku's late goal gave Tirana some hope for the second leg on 26 December. Vllaznia again won the second leg 2–1, with Tirana's only goal coming from a Besim Fagu penalty. Vllaznia won what is officially recognised as their first title, in a season where Loro Boriçi was the top goalscorer.

Despite a relatively successful season which saw the club finish as runners-up, they became victims of the ruling Communist regime under Enver Hoxha's dictatorship. In early March 1946 at the Nacional movie theatre in Tirana, the ruling Communist Politburo instructed the club to change its name to 17 Nëntori in honour of the Liberation of Tirana which took place on 17 November 1944. In the following decade the Communists created a privilege system for the newly created Communist backed teams Partizani Tirana and Dinamo Tirana. This same two system privilege regime also occurred in the former USSR, former Yugoslavia, and the other eastern European countries: Partizani, the Defense Ministry team and Dinamo, the Internal Affairs Ministry team. Dozens of Tirana's talented players were "convinced" against their will to play for either Partizani or Dinamo. As a result, "17 Nentori" struggled to stay at the top during the years 1947–57, however the team managed to gain some of the lost ground during the second part of the 1950s after replacing in part some of the first choice players of its line up.

== 1958–1970 ==
From 1958 to 1964 Tirana kept finishing the championship almost always at the third spot. These years were a prelude to what was about to happen later: Tirana reexperienced its pre-war glory under the services of coach Myslym Alla. At the end of the 28th national championship Tirana became champions of Albania more than twenty years after their last title.

=== Championship of 1966–67 ===
The team repeated the success the year after, but this was an obvious challenge to Partizani's generals and Dinamo's secret service bosses. After having practically won the 1966–67 title three matches in advance, Tirana was banned from the competition and the title was assigned to Dinamo Tirana.

After this, Tirana won the championship two consecutive seasons, losing two matches in 1968 and one during the 1969–70 season.

The club also managed to get some historic results in European competitions, with the most notable being the 2–2 draw against AFC Ajax in 1970–71 European Cup. Ajax eventually went on to win the tournament for the first time. Forty-eight years later, all members of that match were honoured by the President of Albania Ilir Meta.

== 1971–1990: Golden Generation ==
During the seventies Tirana struggled hard to stay at the top, the best result being second place and the worst the thirteenth. Yet the club won the national cup twice. The generation of older players came to the end of their careers marking the end of a highly successful era. However the unsuccessful spell would not last long this time. Tirana won the championship at the end of the 1981–82 season, and they went on to win the title three other times during the eighties, in 1984–85, 1987–88 and 1988–89 and the Albanian Cup in 1982–83, 1983–84 and 1985–86. The club was also successful in European club competitions, reaching the round of 16 four times in the 1980s. Many of the team's players such as Agustin Kola, Arben Minga, Shkelqim Muca and Mirel Josa made up the core of the Albania national football team.

== 1991–2007: Domination ==
During the first half of the nineties KF Tirana (which in August 1991 regained its old name), and Albanian society, went through a period of profound changes. Almost all the best Albanian players left the country and went abroad looking for a richer team to hire them. Even so, the team won the Albanian Cup in the 1993–94 season, defeating Teuta Durrës 1–0 on aggregate. Shortly after this, in January 1995, the team also won their first Albanian Supercup trophy, defeating Teuta Durrës 1–0 at Qemal Stafa Stadium. A couple of months later, they clinched their 15th championship by finishing 12 points ahead of the runner-up Teuta Durrës.

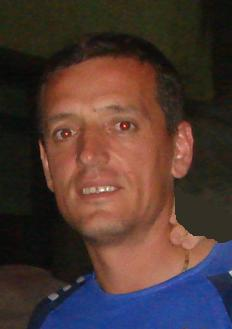
Bledi Nallbani, Tata, played 17 seasons for the club, making more than 300 appearances.

This championship was followed by another one in the 1995–96 season, as Tirana won it by just one point over Teuta Durrës once again. The team also clinched the cup in that season, completing the domestic double for the second time in history. Another domestic double followed in the 1998–99 season. In the following years, Tirana continued to dominate Albanian football, winning 10 of the last 18 Albanian championships. The team also dominated in the domestic cups, adding three Albanian Cups and five other Albanian Supercups.

Even though Tirana dominated in nearly last three decades, since 2007 club has had unstable management, which is reflected in the results. Several factors have affected negatively the team's play, not only in domestic competitions, but also its international appearances.

== 2007–2017: Decline and changes in ownership ==
=== Post El-Sayed era ===
Following a successful 2006–07 campaign which saw the club win the championship comfortably, Tirana began to struggle and they kicked off the 2007–2008 season with two losses in the Champions League against Slovenian side NK Domžale meaning they were knocked out in the first qualifying round. Despite winning the Albanian Supercup in the next game against Besa Kavajë, the club had a difficult start to the season, as they won only one of their opening eight games. They managed to reach third spot, but ultimately finished sixth, their worst finish since 1993. In the Albanian Cup they defeated Butrinti Sarandë, Laçi, Kastrioti Krujë and Elbasani to reach the final against Vllaznia Shkodër, which they lost 2–0 as they failed to save their season.

Tirana had a successful 2008–09 season. They won their 24 league title and reached the final of the Albanian Cup. The central figure of Tirana's success was striker Migen Memelli, brought on loan from Sweden's GAIS, who scored 22 goals in league and eight in cup play. On 14 October 2008, they faced Italian giants Milan in a friendly as part of the first ever Taçi Oil Cup, also known as the Taçi Oil Albania Reads Trophy, which was a UNICEF-backed project aimed at raising funds to create 100 new libraries in schools across Albania. Tirana defeated a strong Milan side 2–1, following goals from Daniel Xhafaj and Gjergji Muzaka before Ronaldinho scored a goal in injury time.

Despite winning the league the previous season, Tirana struggled during the 2009–10 campaign and the instability in terms of the ownership proved to be detrimental to their season as they went trophy-less, finishing third in the league and being knocked out in the quarter-finals of the Albanian Cup. During the 2010–11 season there were major controversies off the field, as there was an ongoing dispute between the club's chief and president. This led to a delay paying the players' wages with some players not receiving their wages at all. The results on the field were largely negative. There were three head coaches throughout the campaign, as Sulejman Starova, Nevil Dede and the Croatian Mišo Krstičević were all in charge of the squad at some stage during the 2010–11 campaign which saw the club finish fifth. They did, however, do well in the cup, as they defeated local rivals Dinamo Tirana on penalties in the final winning the Albanian Cup and earning a spot in the Europa League qualifiers for the following season. However, due to late preparations, that included a delay in signing new players and appointing a head coach, the club failed to reach the second qualifying round as they were knocked out by Slovak side Spartak Trnava.

=== Status change ===
Despite winning the 2011 Albanian Supercup, KF Tirana had another difficult season, and on 12 October 2011 the Municipality of Tirana city council voted unanimously to change the status of the club from municipally owned to a shareholder owned club, under the name KF Tirana Sh.A. The municipality of Tirana initially held a 100% stake in the club with the provision that future private sponsors and donors could own shares in the club.

=== Julián Rubio era ===
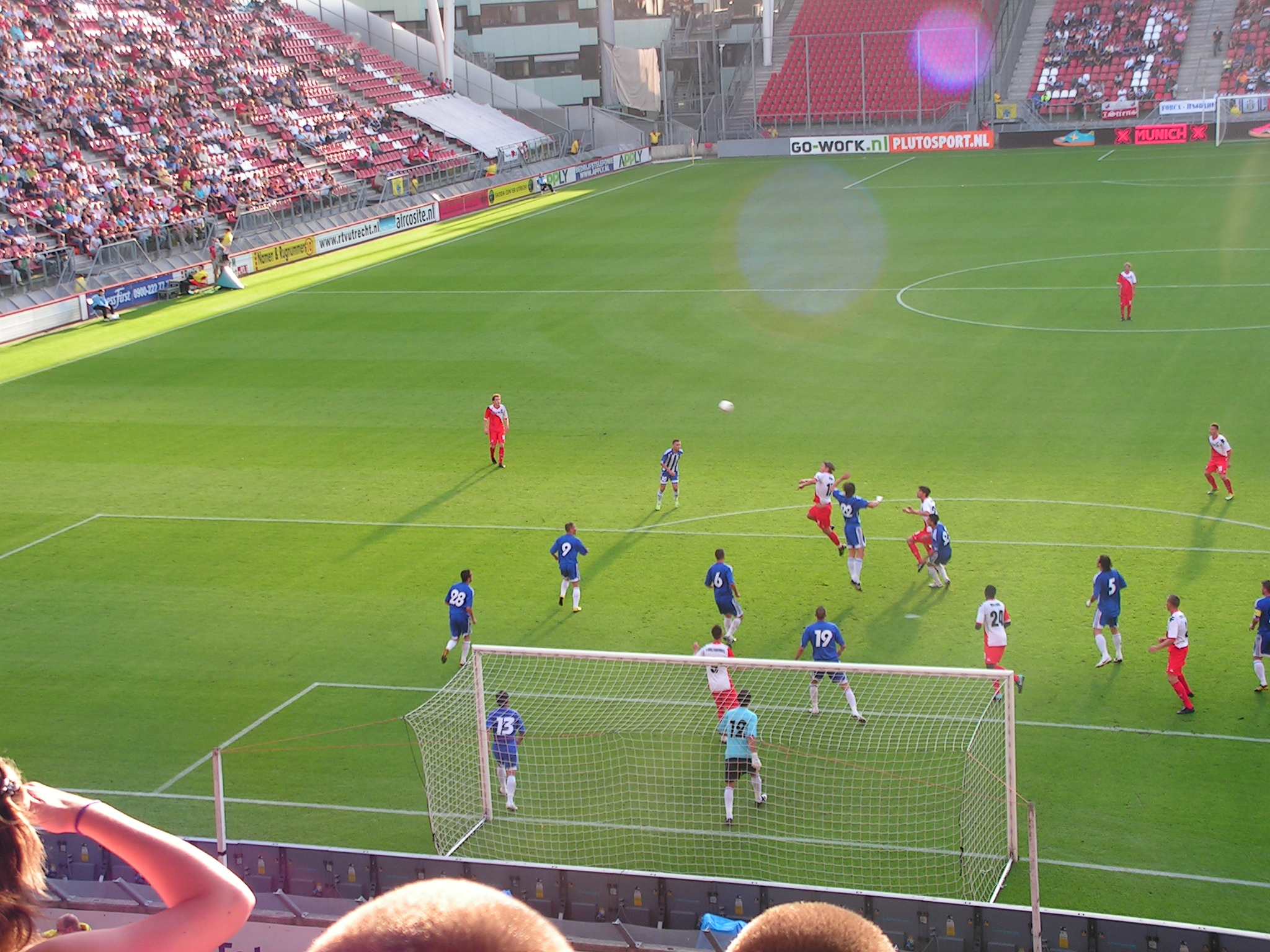
Tirana playing at Stadion Galgenwaard against Utrecht in the UEFA Europa League.

Tirana won the Supercup and Cup during the 2011–12 season despite major financial setbacks caused by the change in ownership status. Spanish coach Julián Rubio led the team during this season, while in league play he managed a third-place finish despite major departures just before the start of the season and players not receiving their wages on time. The club sold their main striker Bekim Balaj to Sparta Prague ahead of the new season, and they failed to bring in quality players in time for their UEFA Europa League run, which saw them being knocked out by Slovak side Spartak Trnava in the second qualifying round.

Julián Rubio left the club in August 2012 due to a contract disagreement after winning yet another Supercup trophy. He was replaced by former Tirana player Artur Lekbello, but he struggled in charge and after a poor start to the season he handed in his resignation after just 42 days. The technical director Alban Tafaj took charge as interim coach as he had done previously, before Nevil Dede returned to the club. He guided them to fifth spot. Dede, intending to use younger players as the basis for the future, presented a project to the club's board and was eventually offered a two-year contract, but the 2013–14 began in turmoil as players had gone unpaid due to Tirana city council's failure to sell club assets.

=== Refik Halili II and avoided relegation ===
The situation on the field was heavily disrupted by off-field troubles. The squad was made up of only 10 players, with little experience, just weeks before the start of the season. Then three wealthy local businessmen took charge of the club to provide much needed short-term investment. Ndriçim Babasi was appointed president, whilst former president Refik Halili and Lulzim Morina were also co-donors during the 2013–14 season. They were able to bring in some new players ahead of the season.

Despite the collective efforts of Babasi, Halili and Morina to build a squad days before the start of the season, the club made a poor start to the campaign which led to the departure of head coach Dede, who was replaced by Alpin Gallo, who himself lasted only five games before being fired. The board opted for an experienced head coach and hired Gugash Magani, who was given the task of avoiding relegation, which is something the club had never experienced. Magani succeeded in keeping the club up as they finished sixth in what is considered to be one of the worst seasons in the club's history.

=== Refik Halili III ===
On 26 June 2014, the Tirana city council approved a proposal to give private donors a 66% stake in the club's assets for the next 18 years, which at the time fell in the hands of Refik Halili and Lulzim Morina This enabled such donors to invest in players, facilities and youth teams. Ahead of the 2014–15 season, head coach Magani and the rest of the back room staff, with the backing of Refik Halili, aimed to put together a squad capable of winning the league for the first time since 2009. They were title challengers in a highly competitive season, as Skënderbeu Korçë, Kukësi and Partizani Tirana all invested generously in their squads to be able to compete for the title. It eventually went to Skënderbeu Korçë for five consecutive times, as Tirana failed to carry on their good form in the closing stages of the season and ultimately finished fourth. Kukësi lost the final of the Albanian Cup to Laçi which meant that Tirana also failed to qualify for the Europa League, thus ending the season trophy-less and failing to qualify for Europe. During the winter break major investments were made in the training facilities at the Skënder Halili Complex as well as the Selman Stërmasi Stadium. The stadium was reconstructed as the club sought to return to it permanently the following season.

Magani left the club at the end of the season, and former coach Shkëlqim Muça replaced him for the 2015–16 season. His only task was to win the Superliga title. But on 17 October 2015, he was sacked by the club as they failed to win against Bylis Ballsh, Skënderbeu Korçë, Partizani Tirana and Flamurtari Vlorë meaning their title chances were on the brink of slipping away for yet another season. Just before November 2015, Ilir Daja took over as the next manager. At the end of the month, the Selman Stërmasi Stadium reopened for the club to play their games again. Heading into January 2016, they had lost just one game against Skënderbeu Korçë in November 2015. Subsequently, however, Tirana ended the League in fifth spot, in a neutral position, yet again trophy-less and out of European participation for the third consecutive season. The Cup campaign saw them reaching only the quarter-finals, eliminated from Flamurtari Vlorë, even though they won the first leg away match.

=== Relegation for the first time in history ===
The 2016–17 season was one of the most strange and contradictory seasons. From title contender halfway through the season, Tirana fell continuously to dramatically succumb to relegation for the first time in their history. The season started well with coach Ilir Daja and by end of first quarter Tirana had lost only one match and was three points from the top of the table. However, Daja was sacked after the home draw against Vllaznia Shkodër. Mirel Josa was then appointed as the new coach. Even though he won the next two home matches, Tirana started wasting points home and away (especially a home draw against Korabi Peshkopi). To add further to the insult, an unexpected agreement between Tirana's Refik Halili and their rivals, KF Partizani agreed that Tirana was to share their home stadium for the rest of the season with Partizani Tirana. This broke the club's relationship with their fans who had always opposed such an agreement. They subsequently abandoned the matches for the entire season as a result.

By end of half season, the club dismissed several "unsuitable" players. And as Tirana was preparing to bring in new players such as Elis Bakaj and others to play the rest of season, they faced UEFA's restrictions due to a pending debt. This further reduced the team's quality. By end of the third quarter, the team was struggling in the bottom four with three matches left, Tirana needed at least five points to completely elude relegation. Their last game was an away match against Vllaznia Shkodër who were themselves fighting to stay in the League and needed just one point; Tirana needed the win. However, after a hard-fought match, they tied the game, finished the season ninth and were therefore relegated. Contrary to their league display, Tirana won the cup for a record 16th time defeating Skënderbeu Korçë in the 2017 Albanian Cup final after extra time. Tirana did not lose a single match throughout the campaign. The Cup trophy also meaning participation in the Europa League qualifying round after a five-year absence.

=== Albanian First Division dominance and quick promotion ===
The club's smart move was keeping nearly all their players with unchanged salaries. Tirana became the only club in the First Division to have an overall high budget, compared only with the top clubs in Superliga. The club approached Zé Maria, a former Inter Milan player with 25 caps for Brazil. Zé Maria brought his own professional staff. His first official challenge would be the Europa League first qualifying round matches against Maccabi. The team lost both games and Tirana was eliminated. Tirana became the first post- relegation Albanian football club to compete in European competition and at the same time win a major domestic trophy.

After their short European adventure, the club started serious preparations for the journey through the First Division. Zé Maria's first trophy as Tirana coach would be the Supercup, defeating Kukësi with a last-minute goal by promising talent Erion Hoxhallari. In the league Tirana dominated with positive results at both home and away matches. The club's goal of a quick promotion in Superliga was reached with three spare rounds to play. The White and blues also won the First Division trophy, in their 2–0 final win against the other group winners Kastrioti Krujë. At the domestic Cup, Tirana reached the quarter-finals, however, their progress was cut short when they eliminated by Kukësi.

== 2019–present: Top flight return, 100th anniversary and two championship titles ==
Return to elite did not prove smooth for Tirana. Even though club approached a number of players during Summer, most of them did not prove useful with only few exceptions. Zé Maria was sacked post home defeat against Laçi and was replaced by Ardian Mema, ex-Tirana player. Even though Tirana produced plenty of football and dominated most of opponents, defense conceded easily and attack was not as efficient. This was never rectified and club was under threat of another relegation until success with the last match against KS Flamurtari, 3–0. Tirana appeared yet again much different in the cup, reached the final and lost to KS Kukësi, 1-2; another failed season.

Tirana finally returned to winning ways and this was very important for several factors: club was playing in Superliga for just the second season after being relegated, Championship was won after an 11 years drought and furthermore achieved this in the verge of club's 100th jubilee. Coach Ardian Mema and director Arbi Laçi approached many experienced players from the Academy to improve the club. Mema suffered the lack immediate results and was sacked. The appointment of Julian Ahmataj did not improve results. When Emmanuel Egbo was made coach were there noticeable results, speculated in part on Egbo allocating players to their natural positions and getting the best out of the squad. Tirana started winning from the first set of 17 consecutive matches and created a winning distance from its rivals. The derby against KF Partizani won at injury time (last derby Tirana had won was in 2013) and the match against closest rivals FK Kukesi, also won by overturning the negative result in four minutes. Title was finally achieved with two rounds to spare. As Tirana had therefore created two quality squads, they did very well in the Cup too, going all the way to the final. However losing to KF Teuta 0–2 in a match where Tirana players did not really look hungry for the double, a feature they hadn't completed since 1999. They wasted endless chances to score after being 0-1 down since 2', which could change the whole outcome and finally conceded the second goal at 79'.

Tirana would compete at UEFA Champions League after 11 years absence.

Fresh from winning the title, Tirana was also successful in Europe, collecting over 1.5 million Euro reward from participation, advancing as far as the play-off stage of Europa League. With a healthy budget and having already players with a champion trophy and quality in their hands, club had the golden opportunity to start a cycle of domination for years to come. Club, however, failed to create such a status. They could not avoid key players parting ways and did not replace them with same or better elements. Covid-19 pandemic also contributed negatively in many ways. Squad sustained many players' injuries and absences on the way as well, due to lack of substitutes. Thus, results were disappointing, especially at the first half of the season. Coach Egbo and director Laçi parted ways with the club at the ugliest possible way, even though they were the main key to success, radically changing Tirana within 2 years from promotion straight to the highest title. It was the day Tirana was eliminated just at the second round of the Cup from an inferior opponent, the moment that club found the "alibi" to sack them. The shameful way of Cup elimination did not at all make club reflect positively in the championship and the January players' market did not add to the team's quality, since January usually offers little alternatives. Despite efforts and better results in the second half of the season and led by an ambitious coach such as Shehi, Tirana ended 5th in the League and failed European participation.

Shehi was retained as Tirana's coach for the following season. The club changed its recruitment approach, ending its cooperation with agent Como and focusing mainly on players from the Kategoria Superiore, North Macedonia and Kosovo. Director Osmani and academy director Muka were involved in the recruitment process. Among the players added to the squad were Taulant Seferi, Redon Xhixha, Ennur Totre, Vesel Limaj, Visar Bekaj and Ardit Toli, several of whom signed long-term contracts.

Shehi also included academy players in the first team, including Gjumsi, Përgjoni, Nikqi and Beshiraj. Tirana took the lead in the fourth round of the league and remained in first place until the end of the season. The club built a 16-point advantage over its rivals and won the championship for the 26th time with three rounds remaining. In the Albanian Cup, however, Tirana was eliminated before the quarter-finals for the second consecutive season.
