= Blerim (given name) =

- Gender: Male
- Language: Albanian

Origin
- Origin: from the Albanian language blerim
- Meaning: greenery
- Region of origin: Albania

Blerim is an Albanian masculine given name from the Albanian language blerim, meaning "verdant" and "greenery".

Individuals with the name Blerim include:

- Blerim Destani (born 1981), Albanian actor
- Blerim Džemaili (born 1986), Albanian-Swiss footballer
- Blerim Hasalla (born 1976), Albanian retired footballer
- Blerim Kotobelli (born 1992), Albanian footballer
- Blerim Krasniqi (born 1996), Albanian footballer
- Blerim Mazreku (born 1981), Kosovar basketball player
- Blerim Mula (born 1958), Kosovar footballer and football manager
- Blerim Reka (born 1960), Macedonian-Kosovar academic, government minister and author
- Blerim Rrustemi (born 1983), Kosovar footballer
