= List of KF Tirana seasons =

KF Tirana is an Albanian professional football club based in Tirana. The club was founded as the Agimi Sports Association in 1920. The club was renamed to Sportklub Tirana in 1927 and has since been called 17 Nëntori, and Puna Tirana before being renamed to its current KF Tirana in 1991. The club has won a total of 49 major domestic trophies, including a record 24 league championships, the Albanian Cup 15 times and the Albanian Supercup 10 times. The club has never been relegated from the Albanian Superliga, meaning they have been the only ever present team in Albanian top flight history.

== KF Tirana seasons ==
Season	Ranking	Goals	Wins	Draws	Losses	+/-Goals	+/- Wins	Points	Matches
1930	Winners	21- 7	7	4	1	+14	+ 6	18	12
1931	Winners	10- 3	3	2	1	+ 7	+ 2	8	6
1932	Winners	29- 6	5	3	0	+23	+ 5	13	8
1933	4	14-12	3	2	3	+ 2	-	8	8
1934	Winners	54- 8	10	1	1	+46	+ 9	21	12
1936	Winners	50- 8	11	3	0	+42	+11	25	14
1937	Winners	74- 8	17	1	0	+66	+17	35	18
1939*	Winners	18- 5	4	0	0	+13	+ 4	8	4
1940*	3rd	12-10	3	1	2	+ 2	+ 1	7	6
1942*	Winners	13- 6	3	3	0	+ 7	+ 3	9	6
1945	Runners-up	32-10	7	2	3	+22	+ 4	16	12
1946	3rd	26- 7	8	0	2	+19	+ 6	16	10
1947	4	26-51	5	4	7	-25	1	14	16
1948	6	9- 9	4	2	3	-	+ 1	10	9
1949	4	25-19	7	2	7	+ 6	-	16	16
1950	9	34-24	6	2	8	+10	2	14	16
1951	3rd	61-45	16	3	7	+16	+ 9	35	26
1952	5	54-19	12	2	6	+35	+ 6	26	20
1953	3rd	47-16	14	1	3	+31	+11	29	18
1954	3rd	47-21	14	3	5	+26	+ 9	31	22
1955	3rd	50-35	16	5	9	+15	+ 7	37	30
1956	3rd	24-19	7	3	6	+ 5	+ 1	17	16
1957	4	22-17	5	6	3	+ 5	+ 2	16	14
1958	3rd	15- 9	4	9	1	+ 6	+ 3	17	14
1959	Runners-up	20-11	8	3	3	+ 9	+ 5	19	14
1960	3rd	22-17	8	4	6	+ 5	+ 2	20	18
1961	3rd	27-18	9	5	4	+ 9	+ 5	23	18
1962-63	4	33-28	7	10	5	+ 5	+ 2	24	22
1963-64	6	32-21	8	9	5	+11	+ 3	25	22
1964-65	Winners	42-20	13	5	4	+22	+ 9	31	22
1965-66	Winners	55-15	19	2	2	+40	+17	40	23
1966-67	Runners-up	42-23	15	3	4	+19	+11	33	22
1968	Winners	63-20	21	3	2	+43	+19	45	26
1969-70	Winners	56-10	19	6	1	+46	+18	44	26
1970-71	6	32-21	9	9	8	+11	+ 1	27	26
1971-72	Runners-up	44-23	14	9	3	+19	+11	37	26
1972-73	11	23-30	8	5	13	7	5	21	26
1973-74	13	23-28	8	8	12	5	4	24	28
1974-75	4	30-17	9	15	2	+13	+ 7	33	26
1975-76	Runners-up	29-18	8	10	4	+11	+ 4	26	22
1976-77	5	31-31	14	5	13	-	+ 1	33	32
1977-78	6	21-20	7	7	8	+ 1	1	21	22
1978-79	Runners-up	41-27	13	9	4	+14	+ 9	35	26
1979-80	Runners-up	33-27	11	10	5	+ 6	+ 6	32	26
1980-81	3rd	38-21	14	7	5	+17	+ 9	35	26
1981-82	Winners	42-15	15	7	4	+27	+11	37	26
1982-83	3rd	38-26	12	8	6	+12	+ 6	32	26
1983-84	Runners-up	34-18	10	14	2	+16	+ 8	34	26
1984-85	Winners	45-22	15	9	2	+23	+13	39	26
1985-86	3rd	57-29	16	5	5	+28	+11	37	26
1986-87	6	43-29	9	10	7	+14	+ 2	28	26
1987-88	Winners	59-29	18	12	6	+30	+12	48	36
1988-89	Winners	58-25	21	6	5	+33	+16	48	32
1989-90	4	40-34	13	8	12	+ 6	+ 1	36	33
1990-91	4	52-40	16	12	11	+12	+ 5	44	39
1991-92	8	38-32	11	6	13	+ 6	2	28	30
1992-93	11	24-28	7	13	10	4	3	27	30
1993-94	Runners-up	36-16	13	7	6	+20	+ 7	33	26
1994-95	Winners	57-27	19	6	5	+30	+14	44	30
1995-96	Winners	52-22	19	10	5	+30	+14	55	34
1996-97	Winners	40- 9	14	4	4	+31	+10	46	22
1997-98	Runners-up	54-19	19	8	7	+35	+12	65	34
1998-99	Winners	48-20	18	7	5	+28	+13	61	30
1999-00	Winners	41-15	16	5	6	+26	+10	53	27
2000-01	Runners-up	56-13	16	6	4	+43	+12	54	26
2001-02	Runners-up	52-15	19	5	2	+37	+17	62	26
2002-03	Winners	57-18	19	3	4	+39	+15	60	26
2003-04	Winners	90-36	24	8	4	+54	+20	80	36
2004-05	Winners	82-32	26	6	4	+50	+22	84	36
2005-06	Runners-up	54-33	17	11	8	+21	+ 9	62	36
2006-07	Winners	64-33	22	6	5	+31	+17	72	33
2007-08	6	46-36	14	7	12	+10	+ 2	49	33
2008-09	Winners	58-27	19	11	3	+31	+16	68	33
2009-10	3rd	38-32	15	7	11	+6	+ 4	52	33
2010-11	5	42-31	11	11	11	+11	-	44	33
2011-12	3rd	33-21	16	5	5	+12	+11	53	26
2012-13	5	30-23	12	7	7	+7	+5	43	26
2013-14	6	36-31	14	8	11	+5	+3	50	33
2014-15	-	-	-	-	-	-	-	-	36
TOTAL		3057-1645	952	464	401	+1412	+551	2678	1817

- Results from 1939, 1940 & 1942 Superliga seasons are not added in the total line.
