= 1930 KF Tirana season =

KF Tirana
1930 season
- Chairman: Bahri Toptani
- Manager: Selman Stërmasi
- National Championship: 1st
- Top goalscorer: League: Rexhep Maçi (3); Emil Hajnali (3); All: Rexhep Maçi (3); Emil Hajnali (3)
Home colours	Away colours

The 1930 season was Klubi i Futbollit Tirana's first competitive season in a major competition, which was the National Championship. The club won the championship and were crowned the inaugural champions of Albania. Two of the club's players Rexhep Maçi and Emil Hajnali were the season's top goalscorers with 3 goals each.
