= 2005–06 KF Tirana season =

Tirana
2005–06 season
- President: Bamir Topi
- Head coach: Leonardo Menichini (until 11 November 2005); Krenar Alimehmeti (until 15 February 2006); Mirel Josa
- Stadium: Qemal Stafa Stadium; Selman Stërmasi Stadium
- Kategoria Superiore: 2nd
- Albanian Cup: Winners
- Albanian Supercup: Winners
- Champions League: 2nd Qualifying Round
- Top goalscorer: League: Hamdi Salihi (29); All: Hamdi Salihi (33)
Home colours	Away colours

The 2005–06 season was Klubi i Futbollit Tirana's 67th competitive season, 67th consecutive season in the Kategoria Superiore and 85th year in existence as a football club.

== Squad ==
Note: Flags indicate national team as defined under FIFA eligibility rules; some limited exceptions apply. Players may hold more than one non-FIFA nationality.

No.	Pos.	Nation	Player
1	GK	ALB	Blendi Nallbani
2	DF	ALB	Elvis Sina
3	DF	ALB	Rezart Dabulla
5	DF	ALB	Arjan Pisha
6	DF	ALB	Ardian Behari
7	DF	ALB	Alban Tafaj
8	MF	ALB	Ervin Bulku
9	FW	ALB	Altin Rraklli
10	MF	ALB	Devi Muka (captain)
12	GK	ALB	Isli Hidi
14	FW	ALB	Hamdi Salihi
15	DF	ALB	Alban Muca
16	DF	ALB	Gentian Hajdari

No.	Pos.	Nation	Player
17	MF	ALB	Julian Ahmataj
18	DF	ALB	Fatjon Muhameti
19	MF	ALB	Engert Bakalli
21	MF	ALB	Klodian Duro
22	GK	ALB	Glend Tafaj
23	MF	ALB	Eldorado Merkoçi
24	MF	ALB	Erbim Fagu
25	MF	ALB	Saimir Patushi
—	DF	BOL	Percy Colque
—	DF	ALB	Albert Duro
—	DF	KOS	Argenat Haliti
—	DF	COL	Diómedes Peña
—	DF	NGA	Samuel Okunowo

== Competitions ==
=== Albanian Supercup ===
Win Draw Loss

21 August 2005 Final	Tirana	0–0 (a.e.t.) (5–4 p)	Teuta	Tirana
		Report		Stadium: Qemal Stafa Stadium; Attendance: 3,500; Referee: Albano Janku
	Penalties
	Muka (penalty scored); Sina (penalty scored); Salihi (penalty scored); Pisha (penalty scored); Rraklli (penalty scored)		(penalty scored) Mançaku; (penalty scored) Qerimi; (penalty scored) Kapllani; (penalty scored) Hodo; (penalty missed) Hasani

=== Kategoria Superiore ===
==== League table ====
Pos	Team	Pld	W	D	L	GF	GA	GD	Pts	Qualification or relegation
1	Elbasani (C)	36	21	10	5	50	22	+28	73	Qualification for the Champions League first qualifying round
2	Tirana	36	17	11	8	54	33	+21	62	Qualification for the UEFA Cup first qualifying round (Note: Tirana qualified for the UEFA Cup first qualifying round by winning the 2005–06 Albanian Cup, therefore forfeiting their UEFA Intertoto Cup first round place that they had won.)
3	Dinamo Tirana	36	17	10	9	53	35	+18	61	Qualification for the UEFA Cup first qualifying round
4	Partizani	36	18	6	12	51	35	+16	60	Qualification for the Intertoto Cup first round
5	Besa	36	13	7	16	49	42	+7	46	

Source: Albanian Football Association (in Albanian), RSSSF.org
Rules for classification: 1) points; 2) points in head-to-head matches; 3) goal difference in head-to-head matches; 4) goals scored in head-to-head matches; 5) total goal difference; 6) total goals scored; 7) draw
(C) Champions

==== Results summary ====
Overall								Home						Away					
Pld	W	D	L	GF	GA	GD	Pts	W	D	L	GF	GA	GD	W	D	L	GF	GA	GD
36	17	11	8	54	33	+21	62	11	5	2	31	15	+16	6	6	6	23	18	+5

Last updated: 31 January 2019.
Source: Competitive matches

==== Results by round ====
Round	1	2	3	4	5	6	7	8	9	10	11	12	13	14	15	16	17	18	19	20	21	22	23	24	25	26	27	28	29	30	31	32	33	34	35	36
Ground	A	A	H	A	H	A	H	A	H	H	H	A	H	A	H	A	H	A	A	A	H	A	H	A	H	A	H	H	H	A	H	A	H	A	H	A
Result	W	D	D	D	W	L	W	L	W	W	D	D	D	L	W	W	D	L	W	W	D	D	W	W	W	L	W	W	W	W	W	L	L	D	L	D
Position	1	2	4	5	3	3	3	4	3	3	3	3	3	4	3	3	3	4	4	4	3	3	3	3	3	3	3	2	2	2	2	2	2	2	2	2

Source: Competitive matches
A = Away; H = Home; W = Win; D = Draw; L = Loss

==== Matches ====
27 August 2005 1	Vllaznia	1–2	Tirana	Shkodër
	Patushi 71'	Report	Salihi 65'; Muka 90+4'	Stadium: Loro Boriçi Stadium

7 September 2005 2	Shkumbini	1–1	Tirana	Peqin
	Stafa 42'	Report	Salihi 10'	Stadium: Shkumbini Stadium

10 September 2005 3	Tirana	1–1	Besa	Tirana
	Salihu 45' (o.g.)	Report	Fortunat 73'	Stadium: Selman Stërmasi Stadium

16 September 2005 4	Dinamo	3–3	Tirana	Tirana
	Goudjabi 73'; Ahmataj 80'; Poçi 85' (pen.)	Report	Salihi 17', 90+2'; Bulku 34'	Stadium: Qemal Stafa Stadium

24 September 2005 5	Tirana	3–0	Skënderbeu	Tirana
	Salihi 11', 85'; Merkoçi 76'	Report	Fortunat 73'	Stadium: Selman Stërmasi Stadium

1 October 2005 6	Teuta	1–0	Tirana	Durrës
	Xhihani 34'	Report		Stadium: Niko Dovana Stadium

14 October 2005 7	Tirana	1–0	Lushnja	Tirana
	Duro 27' (pen.)	Report		Stadium: Selman Stërmasi Stadium

22 October 2005 8	Elbasani	1–0	Tirana	Elbasan
	Dede 44'	Report		Stadium: Ruzhdi Bizhuta Stadium

14 October 2005 9	Tirana	1–0	Partizani	Tirana
	Muka 90+1' (pen.)	Report		Stadium: Qemal Stafa Stadium

5 November 2005 10	Tirana	2–0	Vllaznia	Tirana
	Duro 25' (pen.); Muzzachi 60'	Report		Stadium: Selman Stërmasi Stadium

11 November 2005 11	Tirana	4–4	Shkumbini	Tirana
	Salihi 16', 31', 79'; Xhafa 55'	Report	Stafa 22'; Ishka 75'; Ymeri 85', 89'	Stadium: Selman Stërmasi Stadium

19 November 2005 12	Besa	1–1	Tirana	Kavajë
	Veliaj 58'	Report	Muka 88'	Stadium: Besa Stadium

26 November 2005 13	Tirana	1–1	Dinamo	Tirana
	Salihi 14'	Report	Deliallisi 21'	Stadium: Qemal Stafa Stadium

30 November 2005 14	Skënderbeu	4–3	Tirana	Korçë
	Liçi 8'; Memelli 24'; Osusi 75'; Arberi 90+4'	Report	Salihi 6', 44', 59'	Stadium: Skënderbeu Stadium

3 December 2005 15	Tirana	2–1	Teuta	Tirana
	Muka 58'; Salihi 60'	Report	Tiko 80'	Stadium: Selman Stërmasi Stadium

10 December 2005 16	Lushnja	0–1	Tirana	Lushnje
		Report	Dabulla 80'	Stadium: Abdurrahman Roza Haxhiu Stadium

16 December 2005 17	Tirana	1–1	Elbasani	Tirana
	Hajdari 51'	Report	Devolli 8'	Stadium: Selman Stërmasi Stadium

22 December 2005 18	Partizani	1–0	Tirana	Tirana
	Abilaliaj 22'	Report		Stadium: Qemal Stafa Stadium

14 January 2006 19	Vllaznia	0–2	Tirana	Shkodër
		Report	Muka 2'; Salihi 49'	Stadium: Loro Boriçi Stadium

21 January 2006 20	Shkumbini	0–1	Tirana	Peqin
		Report	Salihi 78'	Stadium: Shkumbini Stadium

27 January 2006 21	Tirana	1–1	Besa	Tirana
	Salihi 58'	Report	Andaveris 61' (o.g.)	Stadium: Selman Stërmasi Stadium

15 February 2006 22	Dinamo	1–1	Tirana	Tirana
	Pema 84'	Report	Salihi 15'	Stadium: Qemal Stafa Stadium

18 February 2006 23	Tirana	2–0	Skënderbeu	Tirana
	Salihi 57'; Hasalla 85' (o.g.)	Report		Stadium: Selman Stërmasi Stadium

24 February 2006 24	Teuta	0–4	Tirana	Durrës
		Report	Dabulla 40'; Salihi 58', 66'; Andaveris 90'	Stadium: Niko Dovana Stadium

3 March 2006 25	Tirana	1–0	Lushnja	Tirana
	Peña 73'	Report		Stadium: Selman Stërmasi Stadium

11 March 2006 26	Elbasani	1–0	Tirana	Elbasan
	Kaçi 76'	Report		Stadium: Ruzhdi Bizhuta Stadium

19 March 2006 27	Tirana	1–0	Partizani	Tirana
	Salihi 54'	Report		Stadium: Qemal Stafa Stadium

25 March 2006 28	Tirana	2–1	Vllaznia	Tirana
	Salihi 7', 60'	Report	Cani 74'	Stadium: Selman Stërmasi Stadium

1 April 2006 29	Tirana	3–1	Shkumbini	Tirana
	Peña 11'; Muka 32'; Salihi 45' (pen.)	Report	Stafa 36'	Stadium: Selman Stërmasi Stadium

5 April 2006 30	Besa	0–2	Tirana	Lushnje
		Report	Salihi 72', 74'	Stadium: Abdurrahman Roza Haxhiu Stadium

8 April 2006 31	Tirana	3–0	Dinamo	Tirana
	Duro 21' (pen.); Bakalli 74'; Muka 80'	Report		Stadium: Selman Stërmasi Stadium

15 April 2006 32	Skënderbeu	1–0	Tirana	Korçë
	Lici 55'	Report		Stadium: Skënderbeu Stadium

22 April 2006 33	Tirana	0–1	Teuta	Tirana
		Report	Mançaku 43'	Stadium: Selman Stërmasi Stadium

29 April 2006 34	Lushnja	0–0	Tirana	Lushnje
		Report		Stadium: Abdurrahman Roza Haxhiu Stadium

6 May 2006 35	Tirana	2–3	Elbasani	Tirana
	Duro 27' (pen.); Salihi 75'	Report	Bejzade 57'; Dede 66'; Kotorri 81' (pen.)	Stadium: Selman Stërmasi Stadium

13 May 2006 36	Partizani	2–2	Tirana	Tirana
	Bakaj 46'; Rodrigo 90+2' (pen.)	Report	Salihi 23'; Dabulla 28'	Stadium: Qemal Stafa Stadium

=== Albanian Cup ===
==== Second round ====
21 September 2005 First leg	Iliria	0–3	Tirana	Fushë-Krujë
		Report	Rraklli 38'; Pisha 85'; Kulli 89' (o.g.)	Stadium: Redi Maloku Stadium

29 September 2004 Second leg	Tirana	4–2 (7–2 agg.)	Iliria	Kamëz
	Sharra 9'; Muka 23'; Sefa 65', 89'	Report	Maloku 7', 20'	Stadium: National Sports Centre

==== Third round ====
19 October 2005 First leg	Apolonia	0–1	Tirana	Fier
		Report	Muka 51'	Stadium: Loni Papuçiu Stadium

26 October 2005 Second leg	Tirana	5–2 (6–2 agg.)	Apolonia	Tirana
	Haliti 59', 68'; Salihi 60'; Xhafa 69', 77'	Report	Hyso 11'; Mema 18'	Stadium: Selman Stërmasi Stadium

==== Quarter-finals ====
15 March 2006 First leg	Partizani	2–3	Tirana	Tirana
	Alan 17'; Abilaliaj 55'	Report	Muka 38'; Patushi 57'; Salihi 90'	Stadium: Qemal Stafa Stadium

29 March 2006 Second leg	Tirana	1–1 (4–3 agg.)	Partizani	Tirana
	Muka 9'	Report	Bakaj 29'	Stadium: Qemal Stafa Stadium

==== Semi-finals ====
12 April 2006 First leg	Tirana	4–2	Dinamo	Tirana
	Duro 26' (pen.); Salihi 38', 61'; Muka 85'	Report	Pema 24'; Goudjabi 66'	Stadium: Qemal Stafa Stadium

26 April 2006 Second leg	Dinamo	1–0 (3–4 agg.)	Tirana	Tirana
	Xhafa 58' (pen.)	Report		Stadium: Qemal Stafa Stadium

==== Final ====
10 May 2006 Final	Tirana	1–0	Vllaznia	Lushnjë
19:00 CET	Duro 65'	Report		Stadium: Abdurrahman Roza Haxhiu Stadium; Attendance: 4,400; Referee: Stefano Farina (Italy)

=== UEFA Champions League ===
==== First qualifying round ====
13 July 2005 First leg	Gorica (Slovenia)	2–0	(Albania) Tirana	Nova Gorica, Slovenia
20:00	M. Kovačevič 66'; Birsa 82'	Report MatchCentre		Stadium: Nova Gorica Sports Park; Attendance: 1,800; Referee: Karen Nalbandyan (Armenia)

20 July 2005 Second leg	Tirana (Albania)	3–0 (3–2 agg.)	(Slovenia) Gorica	Tirana, Albania
20:30	Rraklli 38'; Dabulla 42'; Salihi 47'	Report MatchCentre		Stadium: Qemal Stafa Stadium; Attendance: 3,500; Referee: Bruno Coue (France)

==== Second qualifying round ====
27 July 2005 First leg	Tirana (Albania)	0–2	(Bulgaria) CSKA Sofia	Tirana, Albania
20:30		Report MatchCentre	Gueye 89'; Gargorov 90+2'	Stadium: Qemal Stafa Stadium; Attendance: 7,500; Referee: Kristinn Jakobsson (Iceland)

3 August 2005 Second leg	CSKA Sofia (Bulgaria)	2–0 (4–0 agg.)	(Albania) Tirana	Sofia, Bulgaria
19:45	Zadi 2'; Todorov 90'	Report MatchCentre		Stadium: Balgarska Armia Stadium; Attendance: 8,500; Referee: Martin Ingvarsson (Sweden)
