= Diómedes Peña =

Colombian footballer (born 1976)

Personal information
- Full name: Diómedes Peña Zúñiga
- Date of birth: 21 March 1976 (age 50)
- Place of birth: Robles, Valle, Colombia
- Height: 1.88 m (6 ft 2 in)
- Position: Centre back

Senior career*
Years	Team	Apps	(Gls)
- Alianza Robles
- El Cóndor
- Deportivo Pasto
2002–2003	Mariscal Braun		
2004	Iberoamericana	19	(2)
2005	La Paz		
2005–2007	KF Tirana	21	(2)
2007–2008	La Paz		
2009	Blooming		
2009	The Strongest	5	(0)
2010	La Paz		
2011–2012	Aurora	33	(1)
2012	ABB		

Managerial career
- 2010: La Paz (player-manager)
- 2014–2016: Enrique Happ
- 2020: Municipal de Tiquipaya
- 2021: San Antonio Bulo Bulo
- 2022: Aurora (youth)
- 2023: Enrique Happ
- 2024: Hiska Nacional
- 2025: San Antonio Bulo Bulo (youth)
- 2025: San Antonio Bulo Bulo (caretaker)
- 2026: San Antonio Bulo Bulo
- * Club domestic league appearances and goals

Diómedes Peña Zúñiga (born 21 March 1976) is a Colombian football manager and former player who played as a central defender.

== Club career ==
Born in Robles, Valle del Cauca, Peña began playing for local sides Alianza Robles, El Cóndor and Deportivo Pasto. He moved to Bolivia in 2001, where he played for Mariscal Brown, Iberoamericana, La Paz F.C. and Club Aurora through 2011. Peña also had a spell with KF Tirana in the Albanian Superliga from January 2006 up to January 2007, playing 21 games and scoring 2 goals in the league for the Albanian club, helping them win the Albanian Superliga and the Albanian Supercup. Peña was captain of La Paz, and had a brief spell as a player-manager during 2010.
