= Qazim Dervishi =

Albanian athlete and football referee

Personal information
- Date of birth: 10 June 1908
- Place of birth: Shkodër, Albania
- Date of death: 19 January 1994 (aged 85)
- Position: Winger

Senior career*
Years	Team	Apps	(Gls)
–1929	SK Durrës		
1929–1939	Bashkimi Shkodran		
- * Club domestic league appearances and goals

Qazim Dervishi (10 June 1908 – 19 January 1994) was the first Albanian international referee and a talented athlete and footballer. He was born in 1908 in the city of Shkodër in a noble family of the time. In his honour the sports arena of Shkodër is now called Qazim Dervishi Sports Palace.

== Life ==
Dervishi was born in Shkodër, on June 10, 1908. Since his childhood he had a passion for all kinds of sports and he practiced football and basketball during his teenage years. In 1924 he entered the "Harry Fultz" Technical School in Tirana. The motto of the school at that time was "If we rest we rust" (Albanian: "Kush rri, ndryshket"). After finishing school he started teaching basketball and he started training a team in Shkodër. He is known as the "man who brought basketball from Technical School" because of the popularity he gave the sport in his native city. In 1930 he was named headmaster of the "Malet Tona" campus in Shkodër. In 1939 he was transferred to the city of Pogradec to work as a teacher but came back to Shkodër in 1942. Just three years after, he was named president of the sportive society KS Vllaznia. In the years 1946-1947 he transferred to Gjirokastër where he taught the local youths the sport of basketball for the first time. During 1947 he worked in the Peqin-Kavaje railway as an instructor on physical education. That is where he was arrested by the communist government because of his sympathy to ex-King of Albanians Ahmet Zogu. This was influenced from the fact that he had studied in the "Harry Fultz" Technical School where most of the dissidents of the communist regime had studied. A 22-month investigation was made from the "Sigurimi" that "found enough proofs" to declare him guilty of propaganda against the communist regime. He was punished with a sentence of 18 years but he served only until 1954 because of very bad health conditions. He was paralyzed and he managed to get a paralysis financial assistance. In 1993, he was given the title "The Nation's Teacher" for his contribution in sports. In 2009 the Council of the Municipality of Shkoder accorded to him the title "Honorary Citizen". He died in January 1994 in the age of 86 years, honored from the Albanian people.

== Sporting activities ==
As soon as Dervishi went for studies in Tirana, he started taking part in the sportive activities that were held in the school and often was named among the excellent students in sports. He practised and contributed in athletics, basketball, football, etc. It should be mentioned that in an interview of Master Irfan Tershana, it is stated that Qazim was also one of the best baseball players of the Technical School.

=== Athletics ===
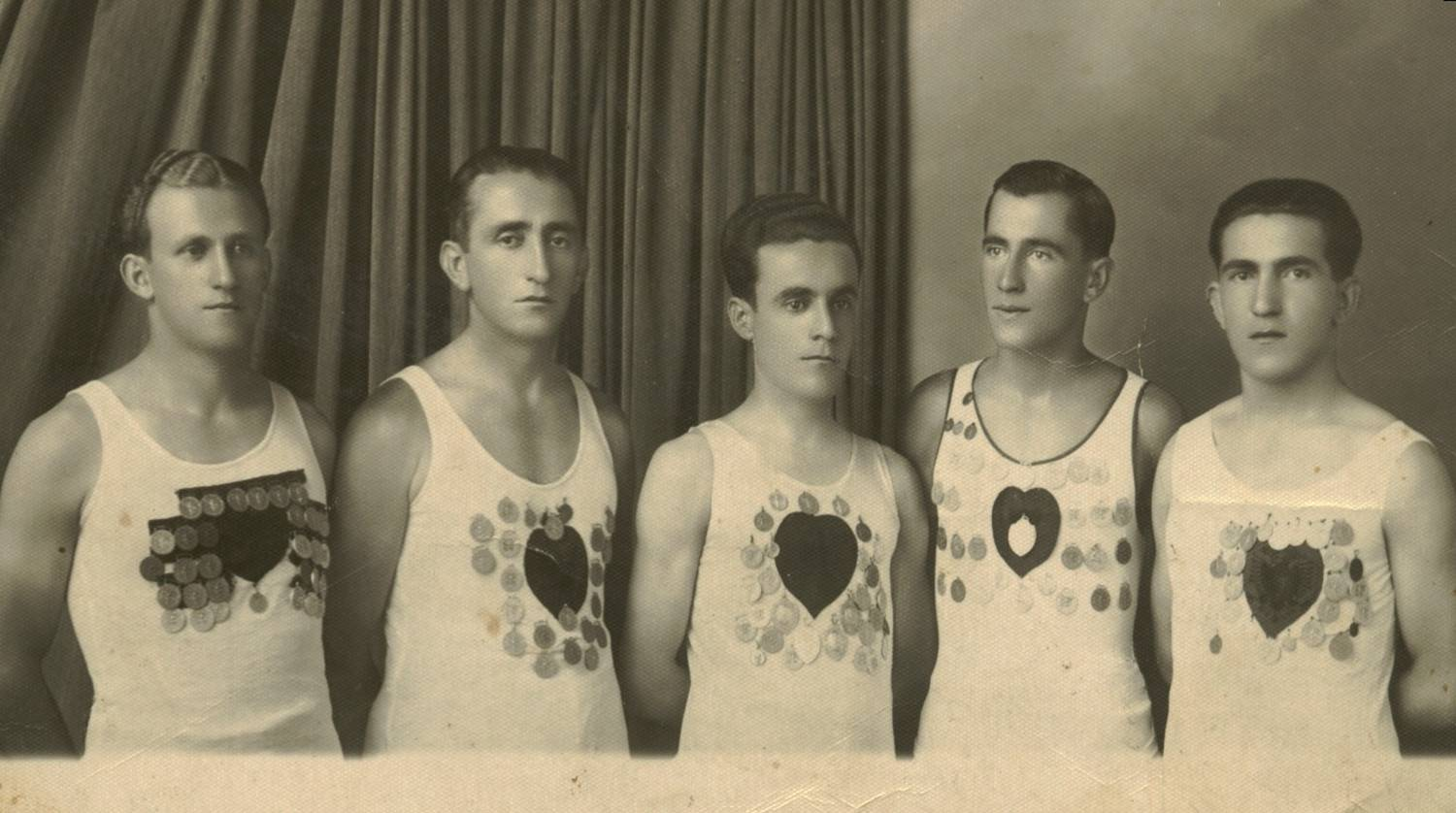
From left to right: Ragip Lohja, Ahmet Ashikja, Qazim Dervishi, Ibrahim Dizdari and Fehti Dizdari

His athletics career started when he entered the Harry Fultz Technical School in Tirana. From 1924 to 1928 he took some first and second prizes in the annual Olympic Games that were held in Tirana. He had his best results in high jump, pole vault and triple jump where he became national champion. In 1929 he was invited to join his hometown club, Bashkimi Shkodran for the first athletics championship in Albania. The team from Shkodër (the photo on the right) became national champions, having even Qazim's help. In the National Athletics Championship taken place in Tirana at 1930 he secured the first place in triple jump with a result of 12.22 m (40.1 ft). He improved his result to 12.41 m (40.7 ft) in the triple jump, which secured him another first place in the National Athletics Championship of 1933.

=== Football ===
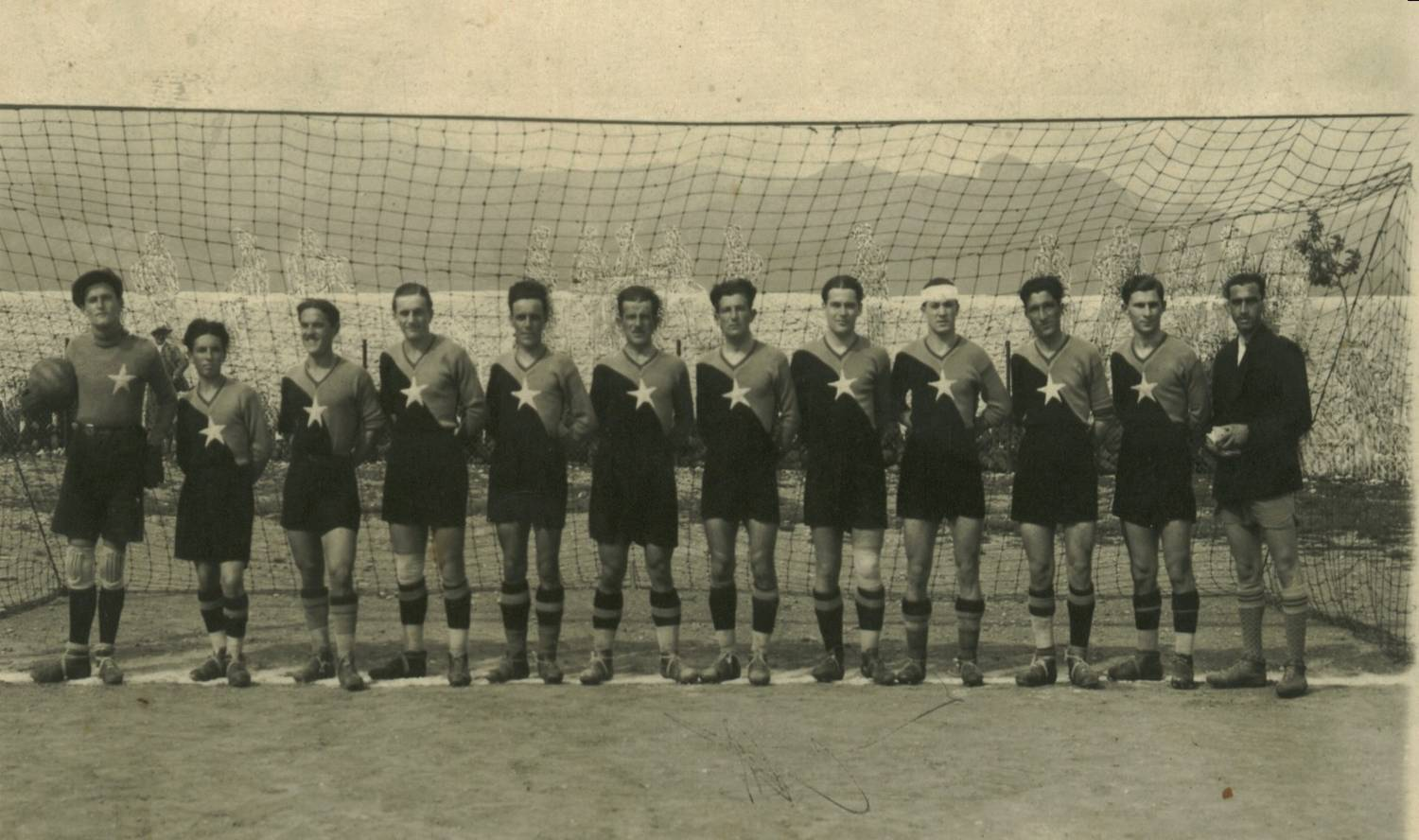
From left to right: Kin Bushati (goalkeeper) Ernest Halepiani, Gjelosh Gjeka, Pjeter Gjoka, Qazim Dervishi (captain), Muhamet Halili, Asim Golemi, Luigj Radoja, Gjon Kiri, Myzafer Pipa, Hile Staka, Luigj Shala (coach)

Even though Dervishi was a multiple champion in athletics, he had great success as a footballer. In fact, the school's vice-director Williams B. Juillirat chose him as a permanent advisor in football along with Spiro Kristo in baseball and Vangjel Qirio in basketball. Dervishi had success in football in the right wing as a right wing attacker. In 1929 he was called from SK Durrës football club to play in an international friendly match versus US Bari, of Italy, in that time a Serie A team. For the next ten years, until 1939, he would play with Bashkimi Shkodran (the photo on the right) and would become a key member of the team. He is also the scorer of the first goal ever in the Kategoria e Pare e Topkembes, scored against SK Tirana. After ending his career he started training youths in Shkodër and learning them to play football. To finalise his work with the youths of Shkodër he organized for the first time in Shkodër the local youths championship with kids coming from the city's schools. In this championship were discovered football talents that would later give Vllaznia the title. Some of the players discovered were Muhamet Dibra, Pal Mirashi, Bahri Kavaja, Hamdi Bakalli, and Xhevdet Shaqiri.

=== Basketball ===
The first ever official basketball match in Albania was played on March 2, 1928, between the Technical School and the "Malet Tona" campus. For the Technical School captain was Qazim Dervishi. The match was won from the boys of the Technical School with the result of 32–14. In 1929 he is named headmaster in the "Malet Tona" campus in Shkodër. Even here along with the headmaster duties, Dervishi gave a primary importance to the sports practising. After a year of training, on June 27, 1930, was held the first basketball match in the city of Shkodër between the local team of the "Malet Tona" campus and the "Naim Frasheri" club from Tirana. The match was played in a regular size field and for the first time in Shkodër were put the baskets. Dervishi was the referee for this game, which ended in a tie. In the years 1933–1934, in the Perash elementary school where he was working (the only mixed school at that time) he started the women's basketball which became also popular.

=== Career as a referee ===
After 1939, Dervishi took another direction, that of a referee and of the director of the physical education. In this year he finishes a 3-months training to classify himself as a referee. On February 22, 1946, he presided the first ever international match between Albania and Montenegro. He also was the only Albanian referee in the 1946 Balkan Games where the Albania national football team won the championship. He presided a match as the main referee (Yugoslavia-Bulgaria, 2–1) and another one as a linesman (Albania-Romania, 1–0).
