= Vasfi Samimi =

Albanian footballer, writer, doctor, and veterinarian

Personal information
- Full name: Vasfi Samimi Visoka
- Date of birth: 1 January 1908
- Place of birth: Visokë, Mallakastër, Ottoman Empire
- Date of death: 1 January 1981 (aged 73)
- Place of death: Mallakastër, Albania
- Position: Goalkeeper

Senior career*
Years	Team	Apps	(Gls)
1927–1928	Fenerbahçe		
1929–1930	Sportklub Vlorë		
1930–1937	Sportklub Tiranë		
- * Club domestic league appearances and goals

Vasfi Samimi Visoka (1908–1981) was an Albanian footballer, writer, doctor and veterinarian. He was the first Albanian footballer to play competitively abroad, as he was part of the Fenerbahçe side for the 1927–1928 campaign. Upon his return to Albania he played for both Sportklub Vlorë and Sportklub Tiranë. He was part of the Sportklub Tiranë squad between 1930 and 1931, but was not a regular member of the team because of his activities outside of football.

== Honours ==
- Albanian Superliga: 1

1931
