= Blerim Reka =

Macedonian academic

- Блерим Рeка
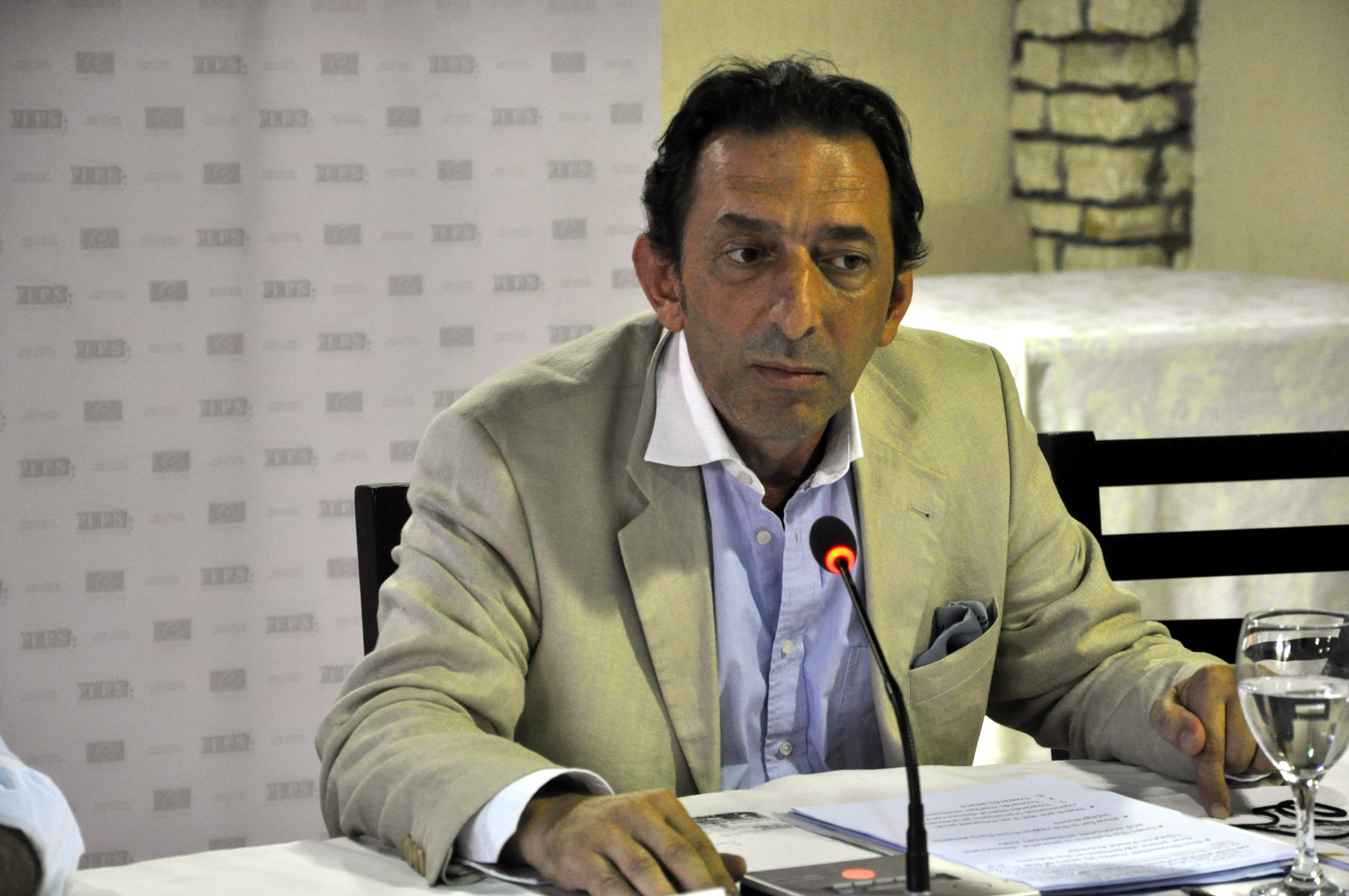

Minister of European Integration
- In office 3 February 2020 – 3 June 2020
- President: Hashim Thaçi
- Prime Minister: Albin Kurti
- Preceded by: Dhurata Hoxha

Personal details
- Born: Blerim Reka; May 22, 1960 (age 66) Skopje, FPR Yugoslavia
- Party: Independent
- Education: Prishtina; University
- Occupation: Presidential Candidate

Blerim Reka (Macedonian: Блерим Река) is a Kosovar-Macedonian academic. He was formerly the Minister of European Integration of Kosovo. He ran as an independent presidential candidate in the 2019 North Macedonia presidential election and is also an author, professor and former ambassador.

== Biography ==
Blerim H. Reka was born in 1960 in Skopje, at the time in FPR Yugoslavia, where he went to school. Later Reka graduated in law from the University of Prishtina.

Reka was Ambassador of the Republic of Macedonia to the European Union in Brussels. Reka has also held diplomatic and legal advisory positions such as Advisor to the President of the Republic of Kosovo for EU Integration. Reka was the Legal Council of the Government of the Republic of Macedonia and Member of the Expert Team for National Strategy and Integration to the EU. Reka has been professor of International Law, International Relations and EU Law at South East European University since 2002. Dr. Reka holds a doctorate in International Public Law and Civil and Economic Law. Reka is an author of 18 books.

On March 5, 2019, his campaign announced he had collected the necessary signatures to become an independent presidential candidate for the 2019 election. Reka's candidacy was backed by the Albanian opposition. According to a statement issued by the Alliance for Albanians and BESA parties, Reka's candidacy was supported by over 11,000 citizens.

On 3 February 2020, Reka was named as the Minister of European Integration of Kosovo in the government of Albin Kurti.

On 5 January the President of Serbia, Aleksadar Vučić, claimed that nine countries did not recognise Kosovo as a sovereign state anymore. On 13 January, Prishtina Insight reported that Reka confirmed on Facebook continued relations with the Maldives, writing "Reconfirmation of excellent bilateral relations. No change in diplomatic relations, established since 2009”
