= 1930 Albanian National Championship =

Albanian National Championship
- Season: 1930
- Champions: Tirana
- Matches: 32
- Goals: 80 (2.5 per match)
- Top goalscorer: Rexhep Maçi & Emil Hajnali (both SK Tirana, 3 goals)
- Biggest home win: Skënderbeu 4-0 Urani
- Biggest away win: Urani 0-4 SK Tirana
- Highest scoring: SK Tirana 2-4 Skënderbeu

The 1930 Albanian Championship was the first edition of the Albanian National Championship, which ran from 6 April until 6 July 1930. It was the first-ever official football competition in Albania run by the newly formed Albanian Football Association. The National Championship (Albanian: Kampionati Kombëtar) was only one of three such tournaments organized during that year by the AFA, the other two being the Youth Championship (Albanian: Kampionati i Nxënësve), and the Military Championship (Albanian: Kampionati Ushtarak). All three championships were under the sponsorship of Princess Myzejen Zogu. The six teams participating in the tournament were Urani, Teuta, Skënderbeu, Bashkimi Shkodran, Sportklub Tirana and Sportklub Vlora, who were to play a ten-game format, whereby each team would host each of their five rivals once with two points awarded for a win and one point awarded for a drawn game. The two teams with the most points at the end of the regular season of the competition would then enter a championship playoff where they would play each other twice and the champions would be crowned based on the aggregate score of the home and away ties, however this playoff was not actually played due to forfeit.

Sportklub Tirana were declared the inaugural champions of Albania following two technical victories over Skënderbeu in the championship playoffs, taking their seasonal total to seven wins, four draws and one loss.

== Teams ==
=== Teams by locations ===
Location of teams in the 1930 Albanian National Championship

Team	Location
Urani	Elbasan
Teuta	Durrës
Skënderbeu	Korçë
Bashkimi Shkodran	Shkodër
Sportklub Tirana	Tirana
Sportklub Vlora	Vlorë

== Overview ==
The competition was the first official national football competition to be held in Albania and it featured six sides from across Albania, which were Urani, Teuta, Skënderbeu, Bashkimi Shkodran, Sportklub Tirana and Sportklub Vlora. Each team played each other twice during two phases, and the top two ranked teams entered the championship playoff which would have been a two-game playoff decided on the aggregate score for the championship title. Each win during the regular season was worth two points, with a draw worth one point and a loss worth none. The first phase was held between 6 April and 4 May, and the second phase was held between 11 May and 22 June. The playoff finals were planned on 22 June and 6 July, but they did not take place due to Skënderbeu's forfeit of both games. Both games were awarded 2–0 to Sportklub Tirana thus crowning them the first champions of Albania.

The very first game of the first Albanian championship was between Bashkimi Shkodran and SK Tirana, played on 6 April 1930 in Shkodër. It ended with a 3–2 victory for the Shkodër team after a spectacular game. Qazim Dervishi, Paç Koliqi, Gjon Kici scored for the Shkodër team, whereas Rexhep Maçi and Hilmi Kosova scored for SK Tirana. In that first week Skënderbeu lost in Vlora 0–2, in a game directed by an Italian referee, Carlo Lorenzo, whereas in Elbasan, Urani took over Teuta Durrës, 1–0.

== League standings ==
Pos	Team	Pld	W	D	L	GF	GA	GR	Pts	Qualification
1	Tirana (C)	10	5	4	1	17	7	2.429	14	Qualification for the championship play-off
2	Skënderbeu	10	5	4	1	14	5	2.800	14	Qualification for the championship play-off
3	Bashkimi Shkodran	10	4	5	1	20	14	1.429	13	
4	Teuta	10	3	2	5	12	17	0.706	8	
5	Urani	10	3	1	6	9	20	0.450	7	
6	Sportklub Vlora	10	1	2	7	4	13	0.308	4	

Source: RSSSF.org
Rules for classification: 1) points; 2) goal difference; 3) number of goals scored.
(C) Champions

Note: 'Bashkimi Shkodran' is Vllaznia, 'Urani' is KS Elbasani and 'Sportklub Vlora' is Flamurtari

=== Championship playoff ===
The Championship Playoff, scheduled for June 29 and July 6, was scratched and KF Tirana was awarded the inaugural Albanian championship as Skënderbeu were unable to field a team for those matches.

== Results ==
Home \ Away	BAS	SKË	SKV	TEU	TIR	URA
Bashkimi Shkodran		2–4	2–1	3–3	3–2	1–1
Skënderbeu	0–0		0–0	2–0	0–0	4–0
Sportklub Vlora	1–1	2–0		0–1	0–1	1–2
Teuta	2–3	0–2	1–0		2–2	3–1
Tirana	1–1	0–0	3–0	3–0		3–1
Urani	0–4	1–2	2–0	1–0	0–2	

Source: RSSSF.org
Legend: Blue = home team win; Yellow = draw; Red = away team win.

== Season statistics ==
=== Scoring ===
- Largest winning margin: 4 goals
  - Skënderbeu 4-0 Urani
  - Urani 0-4 Sportklub Tirana
- Highest scoring game: 6 goals
  - Sportklub Tirana 2-4 Skënderbeu
  - Sportklub Tirana 3-3 Bashkimi Shkodran
- Most goals scored in a match by a single team: 4 goals
  - Skënderbeu 4-0 Urani
  - Urani 0-4 Sportklub Tirana
  - Sportklub Tirana 2-4 Skënderbeu
- Most goals scored in a match by a losing team: 2 goals
  - Sportklub Tirana 2-4 Skënderbeu
  - Sportklub Tirana 3-2 Teuta
  - Bashkimi Shkodran 2-3 Sportklub Tirana

==== Top scorers ====
- Incomplete: only statistics from Sportklub Tirana, Skënderbeu and Bashkimi Shkodran are recorded

Rank	Player	Team	Goals
1	(Albania) Rexhep Maçi	Sportklub Tirana	3
1	(Albania) Emil Hajnali	Sportklub Tirana	3
2	(Albania) Hilmi Kosova	Sportklub Tirana	2
2	(Albania) Aristotel Samsuri	Skënderbeu	2
3	(Albania) Qazim Dervishi	Bashkimi Shkodran	1
3	(Albania) Paç Koliqi	Bashkimi Shkodran	1
3	(Albania) Gjon Kiçi	Bashkimi Shkodran	1
3	(Albania) Vaso Polena	Skënderbeu	1
3	(Albania) M. Sheke	Skënderbeu	1

== Team sheets ==
=== SK Tirana ===
Rudolf Gurashi, Abdullah Shehri, Irfan Gjinali, Xhelal Kashari, Vasil Kajano, Gjon Sabati, Llazar Miha, Mark Gurashi, Bexhet Jolldashi, Shefqet Ndroqi, Isuf Dashi, Adem Karapici, Hysen Kusi, Mustafa Begolli, Hilmi Kosova, Emil Hajnali, Rexhep Maci and Selman Stërmasi as player-manager.

=== Skënderbeu ===
Klani Marjani, S. Grabocka, A. Çani, S. Peristeri, M. Sheko, Y. Tomçe, V. Karoli, Xh. Dishnica, Aristotel Samsuri, Anton Mazreku, S. Kandili, Vaso Polena.

=== Bashkimi Shkodran ===
H. Llukaçeviç, N. Luka, H. Staka, M. Halili, Sh. Llukaçeviç, A. Paçrami, Qazim Dervishi, Paç Koliqi, R. Krasniqi, Sh. Koçiçi, L. Radoja, Gjon Kiçi

== Sources ==
- Albania - List of final tables (RSSSF)
- Frasheri, Dash (2 November 2008). "Kampionati 1, sezoni 1930". Albania Sport (in Albanian). Archived from the original on 13 January 2010._{Dead Link}
- (in Albanian) _{Dead Link}
- Dizdari, Besnik (1999), Historia e Kampionateve të Shqipërisë, Vitet '30 (in Albanian), Albin
