= Emil Hajnali =

Albanian footballer

Personal information
- Full name: Emil Hajnali
- Position: Forward

Senior career*
Years	Team	Apps	(Gls)
1930–????	SK Tirana	?	(?)
- * Club domestic league appearances and goals as of 18 January 2010 ‡ National team caps and goals as of 18 January 2010

Emil Hajnali was an Albanian football player who played for SK Tirana during the 1930s, where he won the Kategoria superiore five times in just seven years and where he also won the first ever golden boot in Albanian history after scoring 3 goals in the 1930 championship.

== SK Tirana ==
He featured in the first Albanian football championship, the Kategoria superiore 1930, a competition which he also won for the very first time in 1930. He was the joint top scorer of the competition in 1930 alongside teammate Rexhep Maçi with 3 goals in a possible 10 games. With SK Tirana he managed to win 5 championship titles, including the first ever one in 1930. He won the Kategoria superiore in 1930, 1931, 1932, 1936 and 1937.
