= Rexhep Maçi =

Albanian footballer

Personal information
- Full name: Rexhep Maçi
- Date of birth: 1912
- Date of death: 1980 (aged 67–68)
- Position: Forward

Senior career*
Years	Team	Apps	(Gls)
1930–1933	SK Tirana		
1933–	Skënderbeu		
- Besa Kavajë
- * Club domestic league appearances and goals as of 18 January 2010 ‡ National team caps and goals as of 18 January 2010

Rexhep Maçi (1912–1980) was an Albanian football player who played for SK Tirana during the 1930 season, which was the first ever championship in Albanian football history, where he won the Kategoria superiore and where he also won the first ever golden boot in Albanian history after scoring 3 goals in the 1930 championship.

== SK Tirana ==
He featured in the first Albanian football championship, the Kategoria superiore 1930, a competition which he also won for the first time in 1930. He was the joint top scorer of the competition in 1930 alongside teammate Emil Hajnali with 3 goals in a possible 10 games. With SK Tirana he managed to win 1 championship title, which was the first ever one in 1930. He also played for Skënderbeu and Besa Kavajë.

== Honours ==
- Albanian Superliga: 1

1930
