= Blerim Hasalla =

Albanian footballer

Personal information
- Date of birth: 13 September 1976 (age 50)
- Place of birth: Lushnjë, Albania
- Position: Defender

Senior career*
Years	Team	Apps	(Gls)
1997–2003	Lushnja	139	(4)
2004–2005	Lushnja	35	(0)
2005–2006	Skënderbeu	19	(0)
2006–2007	Luftëtari	27	(1)
2007–2009	Lushnja	65	(2)
2009–2010	Besa	21	(0)
2010–2011	Tomori		
2011–2012	Lushnja	25	(0)
- * Club domestic league appearances and goals as of 19 May 2010

Blerim Hasalla (born 13 September 1976) is an Albanian retired football defender who played most of his career for Lushnja in the Albanian First Division.

== Honours ==
=== Besa ===
- Albanian Cup (1): 2009–10
