= 2013 UEFA European Under-19 Championship qualification =

The 2013 UEFA European Under-19 Championship (qualifying round) was the first round of qualifications for the 2013 UEFA European Under-19 Championship final tournament.

The 48 participating teams were divided into 12 groups of four teams, with each group being contested as a mini-tournament hosted by one of the group's teams. After all matches have been played, the 12 group winners and 12 group runners-up along with the best third-placed team will advance to the Elite Round. Lithuania qualified as hosts while Spain, Serbia and Turkey received byes to the elite round as the sides with the highest coefficients. The draw for the qualifying round was held on 29 November 2011 in Nyon and matches were played between 26 September and 26 November 2012.

== Seeds ==
A total of 48 participating teams were divided in two draw pots based on the UEFA Under-19 coefficient ranking. Before the draw UEFA confirmed that, for political reasons, Armenia and Azerbaijan would not host the mini-tournament if they are drawn in the same group due to the dispute concerning territory of Nagorno-Karabakh, with the same rule applying for Georgia and Russia due to the dispute regarding the territory of South Ossetia.

Pot A	Pot B
England; France; Belgium; Portugal; Netherlands; Republic of Ireland; Germany; Ukraine; Greece; Czech Republic; Norway; Russia; Italy; Croatia; Switzerland; Scotland; Slovakia; Austria; Hungary; Denmark; Poland; Wales; Azerbaijan; Finland	Northern Ireland; Slovenia; Belarus; Romania; Latvia; Bosnia and Herzegovina; Estonia; Israel; Iceland; Montenegro; Moldova; Macedonia; Georgia; Sweden; Bulgaria; Albania; Kazakhstan; Cyprus; Armenia; Faroe Islands; Malta; Luxembourg; San Marino; Andorra

The hosts of the twelve one-venue mini-tournament groups are indicated below in italics.

== Tiebreakers ==
If two or more teams are equal on points on completion of the group matches, the following criteria are applied to determine the rankings.

1. Higher number of points obtained in the group matches played among the teams in question
2. Superior goal difference from the group matches played among the teams in question
3. Higher number of goals scored in the group matches played among the teams in question
4. If, after applying criteria 1) to 3) to several teams, two teams still have an equal ranking, the criteria 1) to 3) will be reapplied to determine the ranking of these teams. If this procedure does not lead to a decision, criteria 5) and 6) will apply
5. Results of all group matches:
  1. Superior goal difference
  2. Higher number of goals scored
6. Drawing of lots

Additionally, if two teams which have the same number of points and the same number of goals scored and conceded play their last group match against each other and are still equal at the end of that match, their final rankings are determined by the penalty shoot-out and not by the criteria listed above. This procedure is applicable only if a ranking of the teams is required to determine the group winner or the runners-up and the third-placed team.

== Group 1 ==
Pos	Team	Pld	W	D	L	GF	GA	GD	Pts	Qualification
1	Austria	3	3	0	0	13	2	+11	9	Elite round
2	Bulgaria	3	1	1	1	9	3	+6	4	Elite round
3	Hungary (H)	3	1	1	1	5	3	+2	4	
4	Andorra	3	0	0	3	0	19	−19	0	

(H) Hosts
2 November 2012
13:30

Austria	9–0	Andorra
Frank 3'; Schaub 41'; Jäger 45+1'; Friesenbichler 53', 76', 85'; Wimmer 54'; Murg 57'; Savić 58'	Report

Stadion Gyula Grosics, Tatabánya
Referee: Bobby Madden (Scotland)
2 November 2012
13:30

Hungary	1–1	Bulgaria
Szécsi 31'	Report	Petkov 46'

Globall Football Park, Telki
Referee: Aleksei Eskov (Russia)

4 November 2012
13:30

Austria	2–1	Bulgaria
Frank 70', 74'	Report	Angelov 6'

Stadion Gyula Grosics, Tatabánya
Referee: Miroslav Zelinka (Czech Republic)
4 November 2012
13:30

Andorra	0–3	Hungary
	Report	Varga 21'; Lőrinczy 22'; Bese 84'

Globall Football Park, Telki
Referee: Aleksei Eskov (Russia)

7 November 2012
13:30

Hungary	1–2	Austria
Kleinheisler 73' (pen.)	Report	Murg 18'; Luxbacher 66'

Globall Football Park, Telki
Referee: Bobby Madden (Scotland)
7 November 2012
13:30

Bulgaria	7–0	Andorra
Despodov 22'; Rebes 56' (o.g.); Stoichkov 59'; Calvino 61' (o.g.); Iliev 68' (pen.); Angelov 84', 88'	Report

Stadion Gyula Grosics, Tatabánya
Referee: Miroslav Zelinka (Czech Republic)

== Group 2 ==
Pos	Team	Pld	W	D	L	GF	GA	GD	Pts	Qualification
1	Denmark	3	3	0	0	9	3	+6	9	Elite round
2	Cyprus (H)	3	1	1	1	3	4	−1	4	Elite round
3	Finland	3	1	0	2	2	4	−2	3	
4	Montenegro	3	0	1	2	3	6	−3	1	

(H) Hosts
21 November 2012
13:30

Finland	2–0	Montenegro
Grönroos 14'; Klinga 31'	Report

Paphiakos Stadium, Paphos
Referee: Slavko Vinčić (Slovenia)
21 November 2012
13:30

Denmark	3–1	Cyprus
Lindberg 20'; Poulsen 45+1', 67'	Report	K. Andreou 59' (pen.)

Kouklia Community Stadium, Paphos
Referee: Lorenc Jemini (Albania)

23 November 2012
13:30

Finland	0–1	Cyprus
	Report	A. Andreou 62'

Kouklia Community Stadium, Paphos
Referee: Anastasios Sidiropoulos (Greece)
23 November 2012
13:30

Montenegro	2–3	Denmark
Christensen 32' (o.g.); Pavićević 77'	Report	Poulsen 1', 89'; Højbjerg 87'

Paphiakos Stadium, Paphos
Referee: Lorenc Jemini (Albania)

26 November 2012
13:30

Denmark	3–0	Finland
Poulsen 62'; Lindberg 67'; M. Mathiasen 90+3'	Report

Kouklia Community Stadium, Paphos
Referee: Anastasios Sidiropoulos (Greece)
26 November 2012
13:30

Cyprus	1–1	Montenegro
Antoniou 14'	Report	Grbović 82'

Paphiakos Stadium, Paphos
Referee: Slavko Vinčić (Slovenia)

== Group 3 ==
Pos	Team	Pld	W	D	L	GF	GA	GD	Pts	Qualification
1	Netherlands	3	3	0	0	12	1	+11	9	Elite round
2	Poland (H)	3	2	0	1	8	3	+5	6	Elite round
3	Malta	3	1	0	2	4	10	−6	3	
4	San Marino	3	0	0	3	0	10	−10	0	

(H) Hosts
9 October 2012
14:00

Netherlands	5–0	Malta
Achahbar 18', 61'; Aké 31'; Ebecilio 40'; Vilhena 64'	Report

Stadion Miejski, Międzychód
Referee: Nikolai Yordanov (Bulgaria)
9 October 2012
14:00

Poland	2–0	San Marino
Kedziora 49' (pen.); Zieliński 87'	Report

Gosir Plewiska Stadium, Plewiska
Referee: Ilias Spathas (Greece)

11 October 2012
11:15

San Marino	0–4	Netherlands
	Report	Achahbar 13' (pen.), 44' (pen.); Ebecilio 67'; Menig 87'

Szamotuski osrodek sportu i re, Szamotuły
Referee: Nikolai Yordanov (Bulgaria)
11 October 2012
14:00

Poland	5–0	Malta
Włodyka 21', 60'; Zieliński 38'; Horoszkiewicz 53'; Legierski 75'	Report

Amica Stadium, Wronki
Referee: Marius Avram (Romania)

14 October 2012
13:00

Netherlands	3–1	Poland
Achahbar 37'; De Bondt 90', 90+1'	Report	Stępiński 67'

Amica Stadium, Wronki
Referee: Ilias Spathas (Greece)
14 October 2012
13:00

Malta	4–0	San Marino
Zerafa 38' (pen.); Bezzina 57' (pen.); Micallef 72'; Montebello 75'	Report

Swarzędz Stadium, Swarzędz
Referee: Marius Avram (Romania)

== Group 4 ==
Pos	Team	Pld	W	D	L	GF	GA	GD	Pts	Qualification
1	Czech Republic	3	2	1	0	5	2	+3	7	Elite round
2	Greece	3	1	1	1	3	2	+1	4	Elite round
3	Northern Ireland (H)	3	1	1	1	9	4	+5	4	
4	Moldova	3	0	1	2	1	10	−9	1	

(H) Hosts
10 October 2012
15:00

Greece	0–0	Moldova
	Report

Mourneview Park, Lurgan
Referee: Alexander Kostadinov (Bulgaria)
10 October 2012
20:00

Czech Republic	1–1	Northern Ireland
Mašek 60'	Report	Joey 64'

Stangmore Park, Dungannon
Referee: Serhiy Boiko (Ukraine)

12 October 2012
15:00

Czech Republic	2–0	Moldova
Nerad 35'; Mašek 90+1'	Report

Shamrock Park, Portadown
Referee: Mihaly Fabian (Hungary)
12 October 2012
20:00

Northern Ireland	0–2	Greece
	Report	Ioannidis 52' (pen.); Chouchoumis 75'

Stangmore Park, Dungannon
Referee: Serhiy Boiko (Ukraine)

15 October 2012
13:00

Greece	1–2	Czech Republic
Ioannidis 37'	Report	Goutas 4' (o.g.); Mašek 60'

The Showgrounds, Ballymena
Referee: Mihaly Fabian (Hungary)
15 October 2012
13:00

Moldova	1–8	Northern Ireland
Mudrac 81' (pen.)	Report	Ball 18', 21', 29' (pen.), 64'; Duffy 25'; McLaughlin 40'; McElroy 86'; Mitchell 90'

Shamrock Park, Portadown
Referee: Alexander Kostadinov (Bulgaria)

== Group 5 ==
Pos	Team	Pld	W	D	L	GF	GA	GD	Pts	Qualification
1	Germany	3	2	1	0	12	2	+10	7	Elite round
2	Republic of Ireland	3	2	1	0	8	4	+4	7	Elite round
3	Macedonia	3	1	0	2	1	6	−5	3	
4	Luxembourg (H)	3	0	0	3	2	11	−9	0	

(H) Hosts
11 October 2012
19:00

Germany	5–0	Macedonia
Yeşil 44' (pen.); Kohr 63'; Kerk 69'; Kärcher 88'; Gerhardt 89'	Report

Kaerjenger Dribbel, Bascharage
Referee: Mattias Gestranius (Finland)
11 October 2012
19:00

Republic of Ireland	5–2	Luxembourg
Drennan 8', 21', 80'; Hoban 27'; Byrne 55'	Report	Pereira 43'; Todorovic 78'

Stade Alphonse Theis, Hesperange
Referee: Halis Özkahya (Turkey)

13 October 2012
17:00

Germany	5–0	Luxembourg
Kerk 22'; Ginter 27'; Schnellhardt 42'; Yeşil 60', 67'	Report

Op Flohr Stadion, Grevenmacher
Referee: Mattias Gestranius (Finland)
13 October 2012
17:00

Macedonia	0–1	Republic of Ireland
	Report	Drennan 81'

Stade Alphonse Theis, Hesperange
Referee: Artyom Kuchin (Kazakhstan)

16 October 2012
19:00

Republic of Ireland	2–2	Germany
Byrne 58'; Coombes 61'	Report	Kerk 7'; Yeşil 28'

Op Flohr Stadion, Grevenmacher
Referee: Halis Özkahya (Turkey)
16 October 2012
19:00

Luxembourg	0–1	Macedonia
	Report	Angelov 78'

Kaerjenger Dribbel, Bascharage
Referee: Artyom Kuchin (Kazakhstan)

== Group 6 ==
Pos	Team	Pld	W	D	L	GF	GA	GD	Pts	Qualification
1	France	3	2	1	0	10	3	+7	7	Elite round
2	Portugal (H)	3	2	1	0	9	2	+7	7	Elite round
3	Israel	3	1	0	2	6	10	−4	3	
4	Latvia	3	0	0	3	3	13	−10	0	

(H) Hosts
11 October 2012
17:00

France	2–1	Israel
Sacko 27'; Laporte 74'	Report	Ryan 8'

Complexo Desportivo De Anadia, Anadia
Attendance: 60
Referee: Pavle Radovanović (Montenegro)
11 October 2012
19:00

Portugal	2–0	Latvia
Bruma 58' (pen.); Lopes 65'	Report

Centro de Treino, Luso
Attendance: 300
Referee: Steven McLean (Scotland)

13 October 2012
17:00

France	6–0	Latvia
Rabiot 8'; Rougeaux 55'; Benzia 63'; Nguette 66'; Haller 79'; Sacko 90+1'	Report

Estádio Municipal Dr. Américo Couto, Mealhada
Attendance: 70
Referee: Pavle Radovanović (Montenegro)
13 October 2012
19:00

Israel	0–5	Portugal
	Report	Lopes 16'; Mané 57'; Teixeira 66'; Bruma 73'; Djumo 85'

Estádio Municipal, Águeda
Attendance: 600
Referee: Emir Alecković (Bosnia and Herzegovina)

16 October 2012
18:00

Portugal	2–2	France
Lopes 41'; Mané 46'	Report	Rougeaux 13'; Benzia 53'

Estádio Municipal Sérgio Conceição, Coimbra
Attendance: 300
Referee: Steven McLean (Scotland)
16 October 2012
18:00

Latvia	3–5	Israel
Svārups 4'; Barinovs 67', 79'	Report	Gozlan 39', 84'; Altman 41'; Kinda 59'; Hayek 61'

Estádio Municipal Dr. Américo Couto, Mealhada
Attendance: 40
Referee: Emir Alecković (Bosnia and Herzegovina)

== Group 7 ==
Pos	Team	Pld	W	D	L	GF	GA	GD	Pts	Qualification
1	Belgium	3	2	0	1	4	4	0	6	Elite round
2	Italy	3	1	1	1	5	3	+2	4	Elite round
3	Belarus	3	1	1	1	3	2	+1	4	
4	Albania (H)	3	1	0	2	3	6	−3	3	

(H) Hosts
12 October 2012
14:30

Belgium	1–0	Belarus
Origi 41' (pen.)	Report

Loni Papuçiu Stadium, Fier
Referee: Eli Hacmon (Israel)
12 October 2012
18:00

Italy	3–0	Albania
Padovan 45+1', 90+2'; Belloni 55'	Report

Flamurtari Stadium, Vlorë
Referee: Neil Doyle (Republic of Ireland)

14 October 2012
14:30

Belarus	1–1	Italy
Korzun 48'	Report	Ricci 88' (pen.)

Loni Papuçiu Stadium, Fier
Referee: Neil Doyle (Republic of Ireland)
14 October 2012
18:00

Belgium	1–3	Albania
Kabasele 79'	Report	Gavazaj 26'; Kabashi 76' (pen.); Shehaj 80'

Flamurtari Stadium, Vlorë
Referee: Sándor Szabó (Hungary)

17 October 2012
14:30

Italy	1–2	Belgium
Ricci 86' (pen.)	Report	Croux 5'; Kabasele 69'

Loni Papuçiu Stadium, Fier
Referee: Sándor Szabó (Hungary)
17 October 2012
14:30

Albania	0–2	Belarus
	Report	Belyavski 61' (pen.); Komarov 76'

Flamurtari Stadium, Vlorë
Referee: Eli Hacmon (Israel)

== Group 8 ==
Pos	Team	Pld	W	D	L	GF	GA	GD	Pts	Qualification
1	Bosnia and Herzegovina (H)	3	2	0	1	9	5	+4	6	Elite round
2	Norway	3	2	0	1	10	5	+5	6	Elite round
3	Slovakia	3	2	0	1	7	5	+2	6	Elite round
4	Kazakhstan	3	0	0	3	4	15	−11	0	

(H) Hosts
11 October 2012
15:00

Slovakia	5–0	Kazakhstan
Khalezov 14' (o.g.); Lobotka 15'; Duda 19' (pen.); Šmehýl 48', 86'	Report

Gradski SRC Slavija, Sarajevo
Attendance: 35
Referee: Alain Bieri (Switzerland)
11 October 2012
15:00

Norway	3–1	Bosnia and Herzegovina
Grønner 25'; Berisha 31'; Birkelund 41'	Report	Ćerimagić 4'

Koševo Stadium, Sarajevo
Attendance: 250
Referee: Martin Strömbergsson (Sweden)

13 October 2012
15:00

Slovakia	0–4	Bosnia and Herzegovina
	Report	Hodžić 14', 72'; Ćerimagić 17'; Zec 45'

Koševo Stadium, Sarajevo
Attendance: 200
Referee: Alain Bieri (Switzerland)
13 October 2012
15:00

Kazakhstan	2–6	Norway
Sagyndyk 27'; Aslan 34'	Report	Rønning 1'; Berisha 11', 57' (pen.); Grønner 26'; Birkelund 66'; Kwoeme 76'

Gradski SRC Slavija, Sarajevo
Attendance: 40
Referee: Sébastien Delferiere (Belgium)

16 October 2012
15:00

Norway	1–2	Slovakia
Berisha 30'	Report	Duda 45+1'; Marcin 90+3'

Gradski SRC Slavija, Sarajevo
Attendance: 43
Referee: Martin Strömbergsson (Sweden)
16 October 2012
15:00

Bosnia and Herzegovina	4–2	Kazakhstan
Hajradinović 12'; Hodžić 27', 76'; Čiva 36'	Report	Makayev 34', 80' (pen.)

Koševo Stadium, Sarajevo
Attendance: 200
Referee: Sébastien Delferiere (Belgium)

== Group 9 ==
Pos	Team	Pld	W	D	L	GF	GA	GD	Pts	Qualification
1	Scotland (H)	3	3	0	0	9	3	+6	9	Elite round
2	Switzerland	3	1	1	1	8	5	+3	4	Elite round
3	Romania	3	1	1	1	2	2	0	4	
4	Armenia	3	0	0	3	0	9	−9	0	

(H) Hosts
9 October 2012
20:30

Scotland	4–0	Armenia
Chalmers 49'; Kennedy 56'; McKay 66'; Macleod 68'	Report

New Douglas Park, Hamilton
Referee: Oliver Drachta (Austria)
9 October 2012
20:30

Switzerland	1–1	Romania
Adili 36'	Report	Voduț 19'

Falkirk Stadium, Falkirk
Referee: Ján Valášek (Slovakia)

11 October 2012
20:30

Scotland	1–0	Romania
Herron 43'	Report

Falkirk Stadium, Falkirk
Referee: Vlado Glođović (Serbia)
11 October 2012
20:30

Armenia	0–4	Switzerland
	Report	Corbaz 35'; Khelifi 67'; Frey 83'; Avdijaj 89'

New Douglas Park, Hamilton
Referee: Ján Valášek (Slovakia)

14 October 2012
16:00

Switzerland	3–4	Scotland
Frey 18', 56'; Corbaz 38'	Report	Chalmers 15'; Feruz 52', 73', 84'

Falkirk Stadium, Falkirk
Referee: Oliver Drachta (Austria)
14 October 2012
16:00

Romania	1–0	Armenia
Buia 82'	Report

New Douglas Park, Hamilton
Referee: Vlado Glođović (Serbia)

== Group 10 ==
Pos	Team	Pld	W	D	L	GF	GA	GD	Pts	Qualification
1	Russia	3	2	1	0	5	2	+3	7	Elite round
2	Sweden	3	1	1	1	5	5	0	4	Elite round
3	Wales	3	1	0	2	4	6	−2	3	
4	Slovenia (H)	3	0	2	1	2	3	−1	2	

(H) Hosts
10 October 2012
15:00

Wales	1–3	Sweden
Lawrence 11' (pen.)	Report	Hammar 22'; Tanković 42'; Moberg Karlsson 48'

Bakovci Stadium, Bakovci
Referee: Rene Eisner (Austria)
10 October 2012
15:00

Russia	0–0	Slovenia
	Report

Bistrica Stadium, Bistrica
Referee: Ruddy Buquet (France)

12 October 2012
15:00

Wales	2–1	Slovenia
Hill 3'; Nardiello 71'	Report	Lawrence 38' (o.g.)

Bakovci Stadium, Bakovci
Referee: Rene Eisner (Austria)
12 October 2012
15:00

Sweden	1–3	Russia
Söderström 87'	Report	Panyukov 10', 20'; Bolov 84'

Bistrica Stadium, Bistrica
Referee: Ken Henry Johnsen (Norway)

15 October 2012
15:00

Russia	2–1	Wales
Zuev 74'; Yevseyev 87'	Report	Hill 64'

Bakovci Stadium, Bakovci
Referee: Ruddy Buquet (France)
15 October 2012
15:00

Slovenia	1–1	Sweden
Bajde 48'	Report	Tanković 19'

Bistrica Stadium, Bistrica
Referee: Ken Henry Johnsen (Norway)

== Group 11 ==
Pos	Team	Pld	W	D	L	GF	GA	GD	Pts	Qualification
1	Croatia (H)	3	2	1	0	11	3	+8	7	Elite round
2	Georgia	3	1	1	1	3	3	0	4	Elite round
3	Iceland	3	1	1	1	4	5	−1	4	
4	Azerbaijan	3	0	1	2	3	10	−7	1	

(H) Hosts
26 October 2012
15:30

Croatia	2–0	Georgia
Kiš 55'; Ivančić 76'	Report

Stadion Lučko, Zagreb
Referee: Ivan Kružliak (Slovakia)
26 October 2012
15:30

Azerbaijan	1–2	Iceland
Budagov 24'	Report	Adalgeirsson 1'; Hermannsson 39'

Igralište NK HAŠK, Zagreb
Referee: Marios Panayi (Cyprus)

28 October 2012
14:00

Croatia	2–2	Iceland
Traustason 25' (o.g.); Ivančić 59'	Report	Hermannsson 38'; Vilhjálmsson 80'

Sport Centre Rudes, Zagreb
Referee: Dimitar Meckarovski (Macedonia)
28 October 2012
14:00

Georgia	1–1	Azerbaijan
Samushia 10'	Report	Mirzayev 70'

Stadion ŠRC Zaprešić, Zaprešić
Referee: Marios Panayi (Cyprus)

31 October 2012
14:00

Azerbaijan	1–7	Croatia
Budagov 12'	Report	Kiš 35', 65', 72', 81', 90'; Ivančić 43'; Brlek 90+4' (pen.)

Stadion Sv. Josip Radnik, Sesvete
Referee: Ivan Kružliak (Slovakia)
31 October 2012
14:00

Iceland	0–2	Georgia
	Report	Arabuli 40', 78'

Stadion NŠC Stjepan Spajić, Zagreb
Referee: Dimitar Meckarovski (Macedonia)

== Group 12 ==
Pos	Team	Pld	W	D	L	GF	GA	GD	Pts	Qualification
1	England	3	2	1	0	10	1	+9	7	Elite round
2	Ukraine	3	2	1	0	9	1	+8	7	Elite round
3	Estonia (H)	3	1	0	2	2	6	−4	3	
4	Faroe Islands	3	0	0	3	1	14	−13	0	

(H) Hosts
26 September 2012
15:00

Ukraine	6–0	Faroe Islands
Gryshyn 19'; Pavlenko 28'; Yurchenko 34'; Blyznychenko 43', 76'; Azatskiy 79'	Report

Kadriorg Stadium, Tallinn
Referee: István Kovács (Romania)
26 September 2012
18:00

England	3–0	Estonia
Hiwula 23'; Turgott 56'; Akpom 82'	Report

Lilleküla Stadium, Tallinn
Referee: Anar Salmanov (Azerbaijan)

28 September 2012
15:00

Faroe Islands	0–6	England
	Report	Turgott 12', 82'; Akpom 23', 45+3'; Hope 72'; Chambers 84'

Kadriorg Stadium, Tallinn
Referee: Jakob Kehlet (Denmark)
28 September 2012
18:00

Ukraine	2–0	Estonia
Blyznychenko 37'; Gryshyn 64'	Report

Lilleküla Stadium, Tallinn
Referee: István Kovács (Romania)

1 October 2012
15:00

England	1–1	Ukraine
Hope 90+4'	Report	Pavlenko 88'

Kadriorg Stadium, Tallinn
Referee: Jakob Kehlet (Denmark)
1 October 2012
15:00

Estonia	2–1	Faroe Islands
Tekko 71', 88'	Report	Ingason 56'

Lilleküla Stadium, Tallinn
Referee: Anar Salmanov (Azerbaijan)

== Ranking of third-placed teams ==
To determine the best third-ranked team from the qualifying round, only the results of the third-placed team against the winners and runners-up in each group are taken into account.

=== Tiebreakers ===
The following criteria are applied to determine the rankings.

1. Higher number of points obtained in these matches
2. Superior goal difference from these matches
3. Higher number of goals scored in these matches
4. Fair play conduct of the teams in all group matches in the qualifying round
5. Drawing of lots

Pos	Grp	Team	Pld	W	D	L	GF	GA	GD	Pts	Qualification
1	8	Slovakia	2	1	0	1	2	5	−3	3	Elite round
2	1	Hungary	2	0	1	1	2	3	−1	1	
3	9	Romania	2	0	1	1	1	2	−1	1	
4	7	Belarus	2	0	1	1	1	2	−1	1	
5	11	Iceland	2	0	1	1	2	4	−2	1	
6	4	Northern Ireland	2	0	1	1	1	3	−2	1	
7	10	Wales	2	0	0	2	2	5	−3	0	
8	2	Finland	2	0	0	2	0	4	−4	0	
9	12	Estonia	2	0	0	2	0	5	−5	0	
10	6	Israel	2	0	0	2	1	7	−6	0	
11	5	Macedonia	2	0	0	2	0	6	−6	0	
12	3	Malta	2	0	0	2	0	10	−10	0	
