= Legierski =

Legierski is a surname. Notable people with the surname include:

- Jakub Legierski (born 1994), Polish footballer
- Jan Legierski (born 1952), Polish skier
- Krystian Legierski (born 1978), Polish LGBT activist
