= Liridon Latifi =

Albanian footballer (born 1994)

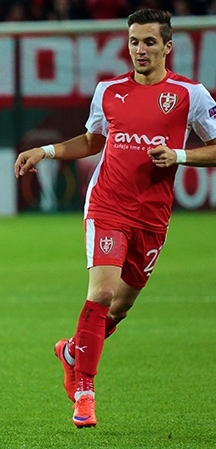
- Latifi in action with Skënderbeu in 2015

Personal information
- Date of birth: 6 February 1994 (age 32)
- Place of birth: Pristina, FR Yugoslavia (now Kosovo)
- Height: 1.82 m (6 ft 0 in)
- Position: Right midfielder

Team information
- Current team: Kyzylzhar
- Number: 77

Youth career
- 2005–2011: Flamurtari
- 2011–2013: Prishtina

Senior career*
Years	Team	Apps	(Gls)
2011–2015	Prishtina	?	(?)
2015–2017	Skënderbeu Korçë	76	(21)
2016	→ Kukësi (loan)	0	(0)
2017–2021	Puskás Akadémia	29	(1)
2019–2020	→ Sheriff Tiraspol (loan)	11	(1)
2021–2023	Vllaznia Shkodër	50	(13)
2023–2024	Tirana	30	(7)
2024–2026	Shkëndija	55	(11)
2026–	Kyzylzhar	14	(3)

International career^{‡}
2012–2013	Albania U19	1	(0)
2015–2016	Albania U21	9	(4)
2016–2019	Albania	5	(0)
- * Club domestic league appearances and goals as of 1 November 2026 ‡ National team caps and goals as of 9 October 2017

Liridon Latifi (born 6 February 1994) is a professional footballer who plays as a right midfielder for Kazakhstani club Kyzylzhar. Born in Kosovo, he represents the Albania national team.

Latifi starter his youth career at Flamurtari in 2005, where he remained until 2011. Next year, he joined his hometown club Prishtina where he also made his professional debut. In January 2015, Latifi signed with Albanian champions of Skënderbeu Korçë and later aided the club to win its fifth-consecutive league title.

Latifi was called up for the first time in Albania U-19 side in 2012 where he made his competitive debut. In March 2015, he was called up to play with Albania U-21 side in their bid to qualify in the 2017 UEFA European Under-21 Championship.

== Club career ==
=== Early career ===
Latifi joined local side Flamurtari Prishtina at the age of 11 in 2005, initially joining the youth club and eventually working his way up the ranks to the first team which he joined in 2011. Soon after joining the first team he left Flamurtari and joined Kosovo's most successful club Prishtina in January 2012. He first played for the club's youth team before progressing through to the first team the following season. While at Prishtina, Latifi along with his teammates Enis Gavazaj and Lorik Aliu went on trial with German giants Borussia Dortmund which initially lasted a week, but was then extended so they players could feature in the Blue Stars FIFA Youth Cup and the RUHR-Cup International youth tournament. Three players were not offered contracts at the end of their trials and subsequently returned to FC Prishtina.

=== Skënderbeu ===
On 28 December 2014, Latifi joined Albanian Superliga side Skënderbeu Korçë by signing a three-year deal, taking the vacant number 27 for the second part of 2014–15 season. During his presentation, Latifi said: "My goals are the same as those of the club." Latifi ended his first season with the club by winning the Albanian Superliga title, playing 18 matches in all competitions and scoring 5 league goals. Following the end of the season, Latifi agreed a contract extension with Skënderbeu Korçë, keeping him at Korçë for one more year.

==== 2015–16 season ====
On 19 November 2015, Latifi received his first-ever career red-card during the 2–1 away lose to Kukësi; he was sent off for his violent behavior after he attacked the opposite player Gledi Mici. After that, he was suspended for 5 matches for his behaviour by the Disciplinary Committee of AFA. At the end of the season, he was named Albanian Superliga Talent of the Season by association "Sporti na bashkon".

==== Loan to Kukësi ====
Due to Skënderbeu's ban from European football over match-fixing allegations, on 8 July, Latifi was sent on loan at Kukësi for their European campaign along with teammates Sabjen Lilaj and Masato Fukui. Four days later, he played full-90 minutes in the first leg of UEFA Europa League second qualifying round against Austria Wien which ended in a 1–0 defeat. He also featured in the entire second leg at Elbasan Arena as the match finished in a 1–4 defeat, which confirmed Kukësi elimination from the competition with the aggregate 1–5. Following the elimination, Latifi returned to Skënderbeu with Lilaj and Fukui.

==== Historical European campaign ====
Latifi was the main instrument in Skënderbeu's historic run in the 2017–18 UEFA Europa League qualifying rounds, as the team achieved group stage for the second time ever and also become the first Albanian club to pass four rounds. He scored three goals in the first qualifying round against Sant Julià as Skënderbeu progressed 6–0 on aggregate. The second leg match was his 100th Skënderbeu match in all competitions. In the first leg of second round tie versus Kairat, his shot was turned into a rebound for Bakary Nimaga, who scored the team's only goal for a 1–1 draw. In the second leg, however, Skënderbeu outclassed Kairat by winning 2–0 to advance to the third round.

In the first leg of third round against Mladá Boleslav on 27 July 2017, Latifi's shot from outside the area was touched by Pavel Čmovš and finished in the net. The goal was credited to the defender, and the match was lost 2–1. In the returning leg at Elbasan Arena, Skënderbeu won 2–1 at regular time. After the extra time ended with the same result, the match went to extra time and later penalty shootout where Latifi successfully converted his penalty shootout attempt, as Skënderbeu won 4–2 to progress to the play-off round for the second time in history.

In the play-off round, Skënderbeu was placed against Dinamo Zagreb; in the first leg away, Latifi scored his team's only goal as Skënderbeu lost the win in the last seconds. In the second leg, Latifi produced a Man of the Match performance by helping the team to earn a goalless draw with a man down in the last minutes, meaning that Skënderbeu has qualified to the group stage on away goal rule for the second time in their history.

A day after the qualification in group stages, Latifi was sold to Puskás Akadémia. He finished his Skënderbeu career by playing 106 matches in all competitions, including 76 in league, 11 in cup and 19 in European competitions. He also scored 26 goals, including 21 in league. During his spell in Korçë he won 2 Albanian championships.

=== Puskás Akadémia ===
On 25 August 2017, Latifi completed a transfer to Nemzeti Bajnokság I side Puskás Akadémia for a reported fee of €1 million. The player signed a four-year contract worth €30,000 a season. He was presented on the same day, stating: I'll help Puskás Akadémia to achieve the goals."

He scored his first goal for the club on 25 August 2018 in a league match against Paksi which ended in a 3–2 away defeat. Later on 26 February of the following year, Latifi scored his first cup goals in form of a hat-trick against the same opponent, leading his team to a 3–1 away win. He left the club following the end of 2018–19 campaign after two troublesome seasons in Hungary.

=== Sheriff Tiraspol ===
On 24 June 2019, Latifi was announced as the new player of Sheriff Tiraspol. He made his official debut for the club on 5 July in the second leg of 2019–20 Moldovan Cup Round of 16 tie against the amateur side FC Sireți, scoring a hat-trick as his side won with the astonishing score of 15–0, progressing to next round 27–0 on aggregate.

=== Vllaznia ===
On 1 July 2021, Vllaznia announced to have signed Latifi on a deal until 2023, with the midfielder making his return to Kategoria Superiore after four years. He made his debut on 28 August as Vllaznia lost the 2021 Albanian Supercup to Teuta. Latifi's first goal for his new side came on 11 September in the opening week of 2021–22 Kategoria Superiore, netting a first half penalty in a 5–3 away win over Laçi. On 31 May 2022, Latifi won his first trophy with Vllaznia, the Albanian Cup, helping his team to beat Laçi 2–1 in the final played at Elbasan Arena; Vllaznia's first goal was assisted by Latifi, who got past two opposition players before delivering a cross which was finished by Ardit Hoxhaj.

== International career ==
=== Albania U19 ===
Latifi was called up to the Albania national under-19 football team to participate in the 2013 UEFA European Under-19 Championship qualification, coached by Foto Strakosha. Latifi made his international debut with Albania U19 on 17 October 2012 by playing as a half-time substitute for Lorenc Shehaj in the 2–0 home defeat to Belarus U19.

=== Albania U20 ===
Latifi was called up at Albania national under-20 football team by coach Skënder Gega to participate in the 2013 Mediterranean Games football tournament which began on 19 June 2013 in Mersin, Turkey. However he was not selected in the final squad which participated in the tournament.

=== Albania U21 ===
He debuted with the Albania national under-21 football team under coach Skënder Gega in a friendly against Iran U23 on 21 January 2015 held in Antalya, Turkey.

Following a good run of form since joining Skënderbeu Korçë in March 2015, he received his first Albania under-21 call up by Skënder Gega for a 2017 European Under-21 Championship qualifier against Liechtenstein U21 on 28 March 2015. He made his debut for the Albania under-21 side against Liechtenstein U21 and managed also to score in his debut in the 29th minute of the match for the opening goal after an assist in the area by Enis Gavazaj and with the second goal scored in the 52nd minute by Rey Manaj they signed the Albania U21s' 0–2 away victory. Latifi was called up by a new appointed coach at the Albania U-21, Redi Jupi, for the qualifying matches against Israel and Portugal on 3 and 8 September 2015. He played as a starter on 3 September 2015 against Israel and was substituted off in the 62nd minute for Endri Çekiçi which then scored the equalising 1–1 goal in the 82nd minute to make Albania U-21 taking a draw.

=== Senior team ===
Latifi got his first call up to the senior Albania side by coach Gianni De Biasi for the 2018 FIFA World Cup qualification matches against Liechtenstein on 6 October 2016 and against Spain on 9 October 2016. He didn't featured in any of both matches. He was called up then for the 5th 2018 FIFA World Cup qualification fixture against Italy on 24 March 2017 and the Friendly match against Bosnia and Herzegovina on 28 March 2017. Latifi made his first senior debut on 24 March 2017 against Italy coming on as a substitute in the 88th minute in place of Migjen Basha.

== Personal life ==
In June 2022, Latifi tested positive for COVID-19.

== Career statistics ==
=== Club ===
As of 5 July 2019

Appearances and goals by club, season and competition
Club	Season	League			Cup		Europe		Other (Note: Including other competitions, such as Albanian Supercup)		Total	
Club	Season	Division	Apps	Goals	Apps	Goals	Apps	Goals	Apps	Goals	Apps	Goals
Skënderbeu Korçë	2014–15	Albanian Superliga	14	5	4	0	—		—		18	5
Skënderbeu Korçë	2015–16	Albanian Superliga	28	5	2	0	11 (Note: Appearances in the UEFA Champions League)	1	—		41	6
Skënderbeu Korçë	2016–17	Albanian Superliga	34	11	5	1	2 (Note: Played with Kukësi in a short-time loan)	0	—		41	12
Skënderbeu Korçë	2017–18	Albanian Superliga	—		—		8 (Note: Appearances in the UEFA Europa League)	4	—		8	4
Skënderbeu Korçë	Total		76	21	11	1	21	5	—		108	27
Puskás Akadémia	2017–18	Nemzeti Bajnokság I	12	0	1	0	—		—		13	0
Puskás Akadémia	2018–19	Nemzeti Bajnokság I	17	1	2	3	—		—		19	4
Puskás Akadémia	2020–21	Nemzeti Bajnokság I	0	0	0	0	1	0	—		1	0
Puskás Akadémia	Total		29	1	4	5	1	0	—		35	6
Sheriff Tiraspol	2019	National Division	0	0	1	3	0	0	—		1	3
Career total			105	22	17	9	22	5	—		144	36

=== International ===
As of 9 October 2017

Appearances and goals by national team and year
National team	Year	Apps	Goals
Albania	2016	0	0
Albania	2017	5	0
Total		5	0

== Honours ==
Prishtina

- Superleague of Kosovo runner-up: 2013–14

Skënderbeu

- Albanian Superliga: 2014–15, 2015–16
- Albanian Cup runner-up: 2016–17
- Albanian Supercup runner-up: 2015, 2016

Vllaznia

- Albanian Cup: 2021–22

Shkëndija

- Macedonian First Football League:2024–25

Individual

- Albanian Superliga Talent of the Season: 2015–16
