= Enis Gavazaj =

Albanian footballer (born 1995)

Personal information
- Date of birth: 21 March 1995 (age 31)
- Place of birth: Prizren, Kosovo, Serbia, FR Yugoslavia
- Height: 1.77 m (5 ft 10 in)
- Position: Left winger

Youth career
- 2003–2008: Getoari
- 2008–2011: Liria Prizren
- 2011–2013: Prishtina
- 2013: Gent

Senior career*
Years	Team	Apps	(Gls)
2013–2016	Gent	7	(0)
2015–2016	→ Roeselare (loan)	5	(0)
2016–2019	Skënderbeu Korçë	53	(3)
2018	→ Yenisey Krasnoyarsk (loan)	7	(0)
2019	→ Dinamo Minsk (loan)	5	(0)
2019–2020	Kukësi	36	(2)
2020–2021	Prishtina	10	(1)
2021–2022	Dinamo Tirana	9	(0)
2022	Struga	0	(0)
2023	Drenica	0	(0)
2024	Liria Prizren		
Total		132	(6)

International career
2012–2013	Albania U19	6	(1)
2013	Albania U20	5	(0)
2013–2016	Albania U21	11	(1)
2018	Albania	3	(0)
- * Club domestic league appearances and goals

Enis Gavazaj (born 21 March 1995) is a former professional footballer who plays as a winger. Born in Yugoslavia, he represented Albania internationally.

== Club career ==
=== Early career ===
He started his youth career at the age of 8 at Liria Prizren school academy Getoari, from where he moved to the youth teams of the club in 2008 where he stayed for 3 years until 2011, before moving to the most successful football club in Kosovo, FC Prishtina, at the age of 16. While at Prishtina, Gavazaj along with his teammates Liridon Latifi and Lorik Aliu went on trial with German giants Borussia Dortmund which initially lasted a week, but was then extended so they players could feature in the Blue Stars FIFA Youth Cup and the RUHR-Cup International youth tournament. Three players were not offered contracts at the end of their trials and subsequently returned to FC Prishtina. Standing for two years at FC Prishtina, on 8 August 2013 he signed for Belgium side K.A.A. Gent in the Belgian Pro League.

=== Gent ===
Gavazaj was called up for the first time in the first squad for the league match against Anderlecht on 15 December 2013, which finished in a 1–2 loss with Gavazaj on bench. His competitive debut occurred later on 26 January of the following year at the age of 18, entering in the last moments at a 2–1 win over Genk. Gavazaj played for the first time as starter on 1 March in the matchday 28 against Sporting Charleroi.

His first score-sheet contributions came seven days later against Cercle Brugge, coming on the second half and assisting the Mahamadou Habibou goal in an eventual 1–4 away win. His performances was praised as he was included in the best XI of Belgian Pro League. He finished his first season in Belgium by making 7 league appearances, only one as starter, collecting 175 minutes on the field as Gent finished 7th in the standing, remaining out of title playoff.

Gavazaj did not play for 4 months since the start of the 2014–15 season and this due to several injuries that have followed him, including and at one call-up with Albania under-21 squad. But anyway in February 2015, Gavazaj announced that he was fully fit and got returning in training.

On 6 July 2015, Gavazaj was loaned to Belgian Second Division side Roeselare to gain more experience by enjoying more playing options. He made his competitive debut for the team on 7 August by featuring in the second half of the 0–2 home loss to Seraing. However, during the first half of the 2015–16 season Gavazaj featured in just 5 matches playing in all as a second-half substitute.

=== Skënderbeu Korçë ===
On 26 June 2016, Gavazaj completed a transfer to Skënderbeu Korçë by penning a contract until June 2019. He was given squad number 7, and made his debut for the team on 24 August in the 2016 Albanian Supercup against Kukësi which finished in a 3–1 loss at Selman Stërmasi Stadium. Gavazaj made his first Albanian Superliga appearance in the opening matchday against Flamurtari Vlorë on 7 September, entering in the last 15 minutes of a 2–1 home win. He scored his maiden Skënderbeu goal via a penalty kick later on 5 October in the 8–0 hammering of Butrinti Sarandë in the second leg of 2016–17 Albanian Cup first round, as the team progressed to the next round 9–1 on aggregate. On 20 May 2017, during the decisive match against Kukësi for the championship, Gavazaj along with other teammates were included in a massive brawl with referee Enea Jorgji. Everything started in the 59th minute when the referee didn't give a clear penalty to Skënderbeu after a foul inside the zone on Liridon Latifi, instead booking him for diving. He played for 75 minutes before being replaced by Nazmi Gripshi, as 9-men Skënderbeu eventually were defeated 2–0 at Zeqir Ymeri Stadium, meaning that they have failed to win the championship for the first time in six years. Gavazaj finished his first season in Korçë by making 31 appearances, including 24 in league, scoring 2 goals, both in Albanian Cup, as Skënderbeu finished 3rd in championship and lost the cup final to Tirana.

Gavazaj made 7 appearances in 2017–18 UEFA Europa League qualifying rounds as Skënderbeu become the first Albanian club to pass four rounds, eventually reaching the group stage for the second time in history after defeating Dinamo Zagreb. On 28 September, in the matchday 2 of Group B against Young Boys, Gavazaj suffered a face injury and was replaced in 20th minute as Skënderbeu took the first point of campaign. Following the examinations, it was confirmed that the surgery was necessary. He undergo surgery on 2 October in the cheekbone and the recovery time was more than a month. He returned in action on 28 October by making a substitute appearance against Luftëtari Gjirokastër, scoring with a left-footed shoot inside the box to make the score 2–0. It was his first Albanian Superliga goal.

=== Yenisey Krasnoyarsk ===
On 16 July 2018, he signed with the Russian Premier League club FC Yenisey Krasnoyarsk. On 22 February 2019, his Yenisey contract was dissolved by mutual consent.

== International career ==
Gavazaj was member of the Kosovo national youth football teams for 2 years before moving to the Albania national youth football teams principally at the Albania national under-19 football team.

=== Youth ===
==== Albania U19 ====
He was included in Foto Strakosha's U19 squad for their 2013 UEFA European Under-19 Championship qualification. In the first match of the tournament on 12 October 2012 against Italy U19, Gavazaj made it his debut by playing as a starter and got substituted off in the 79th minute for Lorenc Shehaj in a match finished as a 3–0 loss. In the next match against Belgium U19 he included in the starting line-up and after 26 minutes of play, he scored a long-range goal away from 33 meters. The match finished in the 3–1 victory.

After his good performances with under-19 side Gavazaj was called up at Albania national under-21 football team by coach Skënder Gega and participated in three 2015 UEFA European Under-21 Championship qualification Group 4 matches in months August, September and October 2013 before returning again to Albania U19 to participate in another qualification campaign for Under-19s, the 2014 UEFA European Under-19 Championship qualifying round. He played all 3 matches as full 90 minutes against Greece U19 on 12 November 2013 in the 1–0 loss and two 1–1 draws days later against Slovakia U19 & Bulgaria U19. Albania U19 finished in the last place in the ranking table.

==== Albania U20 ====
Gavazaj was called up at Albania national under-20 football team by coach Skënder Gega to participate in the 2013 Mediterranean Games football tournament which began on 19 June 2013 in Mersin, Turkey. Gavazaj played in all 5 Albania U20s matches in which 2 of them were full 90-minutes, 1 as starter until second half and 2 others as a substitute. Albania U20 was ranked in the last place out of 8 teams.

==== Albania U21 ====
Following his good performances with Albania U19, Gavazaj received his first call-up at Albania national under-21 football team by coach Skënder Gega for the match against Austria, valid for the 2015 UEFA European Under-21 Championship qualification Group 4. He made his debut against Austria on 14 August 2013, by coming on as a substitute in the 65th minute in place of Herolind Shala and the match finished in the loss 0–1. He made it another two appearances in the 2015 UEFA European Under-21 Championship qualification Group 4, playing against Spain on 9 September 2013, finished in the loss 4–0 and against Bosnia and Herzegovina on 15 October 2013, finished in the loss 0–1.

Gavazaj called up again in Albania U21 for the closing match of the 2015 UEFA European Under-21 Championship qualification Group 4 on 5 March 2014, against Austria, which previously he were called up for the first time and had made it his debut for Albania U21. He played against Austria U21 as a starter and scored the match opening goal in the 19th minute, where the match finished in away 1–3 victory with other goals scored by Vasil Shkurti and Herolind Shala.

Gavazaj was called up for the next tournament even of Albania U21, the 2017 UEFA European Under-21 Championship qualification opening match against Liechtenstein on 28 March 2015. Under the same coach Skënder Gega he retained his starting place against Liechtenstein where in the 31st minute he managed to take a personal action from the left side and to provide an assist for Liridon Latifi, who inside the area scores the opening goal. Then in the second-half Rey Manaj which came in as a substitute, scored the second goal to give Albania U21 the 2–0 victory.

Gavazaj was called up by a new appointed coach at the Albania U21, Redi Jupi, for the 2017 UEFA European Under-21 Championship qualification matches against Israel and Portugal on 3 and 8 September 2015. For the match against Israel, he was named as the national side Captain playing the full 90-minutes match finished in the 1–1 draw.

== Personal life ==
His brother Zenel Gavazaj is also a professional footballer who plays for Skënderbeu in the Albanian Superliga.

== Career statistics ==
=== Club ===
As of 14 September 2017

Club	Season	League			Cup		Europe (Note: Including continental competitions, such as UEFA Champions League and UEFA Europa League)		Other (Note: Including other competitions, such as Albanian Supercup)		Total	
Club	Season	Division	Apps	Goals	Apps	Goals	Apps	Goals	Apps	Goals	Apps	Goals
Gent	2013–14	Belgian Pro League	7	0	0	0	—		—		7	0
Gent	2014–15	Belgian Pro League	—		—		—		—		—	
Gent	Total		7	0	0	0	0	0	0	0	7	0
Roeselare	2015–16	Belgian Second Division	5	0	—		—		—		5	0
Roeselare	Total		5	0	0	0	0	0	0	0	5	0
Skënderbeu Korçë	2016–17	Albanian Superliga	24	0	7	2	—		1	0	32	2
Skënderbeu Korçë	2017–18	Albanian Superliga	1	0	—		8 (Note: Appearances in the UEFA Europa League)	0	—		9	0
Skënderbeu Korçë	Total		25	0	7	2	8	0	1	0	41	2
Career total			37	0	7	2	8	0	1	0	53	2

==== International goals ====
As of 12 October 2012. Albania U19 score listed first, score column indicates score after each Gavazaj's goal.

International goals by date, venue, cap, opponent, score, result and competition
No.	Date	Venue	Cap	Opponent	Score	Result	Competition
1	14 October 2012	Flamurtari Stadium, Vlorë, Albania	2	Belgium	1–0	3–1	2013 UEFA European Under-19 Championship qualification

As of 5 March 2014. Albania U21 score listed first, score column indicates score after each Gavazaj's goal.

International goals by date, venue, cap, opponent, score, result and competition
No.	Date	Venue	Cap	Opponent	Score	Result	Competition
1	5 March 2014	UPC-Arena, Graz, Austria	4	Austria	1–0	3–1	2015 UEFA European Under-21 Championship qualification
