= Kategoria Superiore Talent of the Season =

Football award in Albania

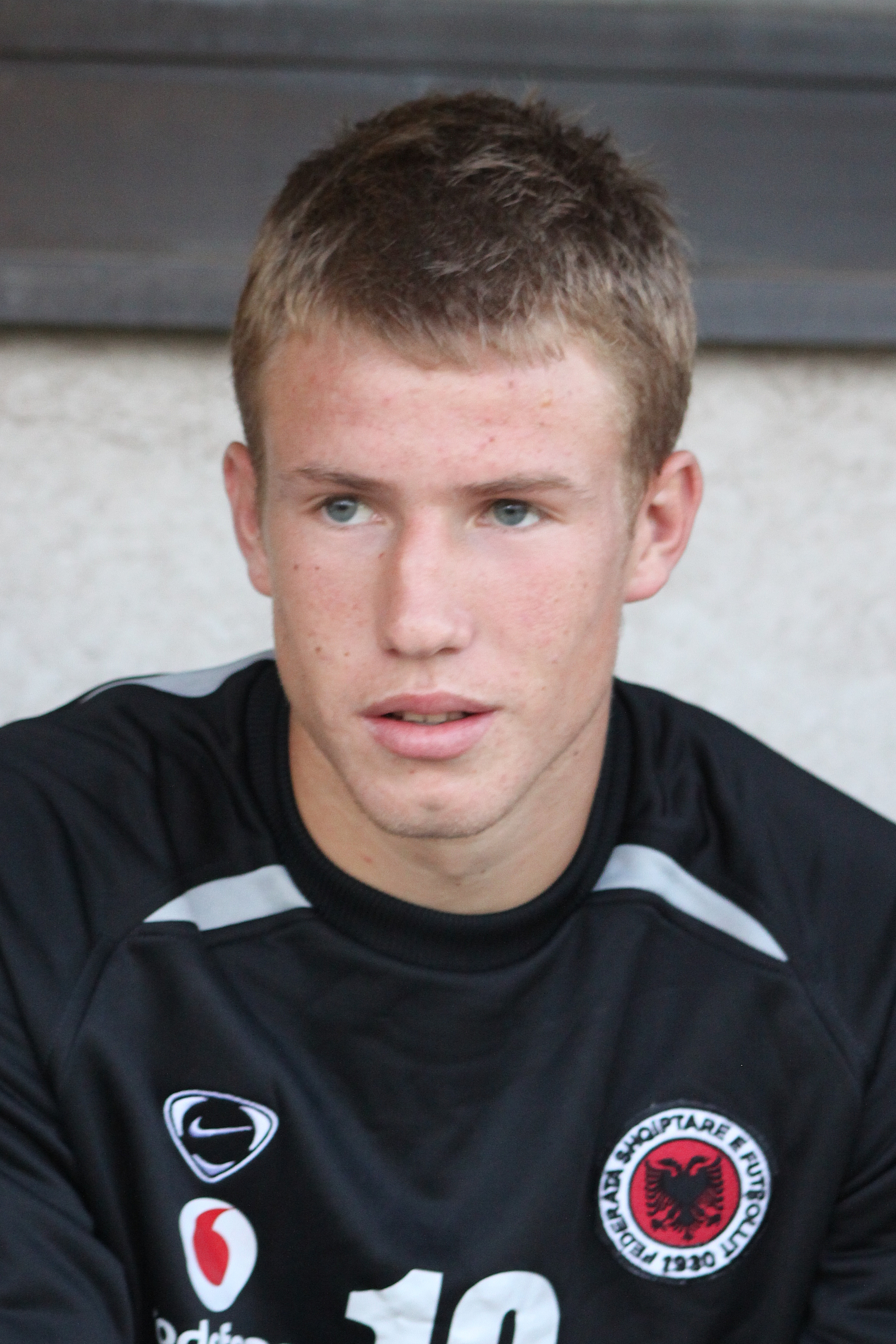
Bekim Balaj is the only player to have won the award twice.

The Kategoria Superiore Talent of the Year is an annual award given to the most talented player of the Kategoria Superiore by association "Sporti Na Bashkon". This award was established in the 2008–09 season.

== Winners ==
Year	Player	Club	Ref
2008–09	Emiljano Vila	(Albania) Teuta Durrës	
2009–10	Bekim Balaj	(Albania) Vllaznia Shkodër	
2010–11	Odise Roshi; Armando Vajushi	(Albania) Flamurtari Vlorë (Albania) Vllaznia Shkodër	
2011–12	Bekim Balaj	(Albania) Tirana	
2012–13	Gledi Mici	(Albania) Flamurtari Vlorë	
2013–14	Mario Morina	(Albania) Tirana	
2014–15	Amir Rrahmani	(Albania) Partizani Tirana	
2015–16	Liridon Latifi	(Albania) Skënderbeu Korçë	
2016–17	Dejvi Bregu	(Albania) Luftëtari Gjirokastër	
2017–18	Kristal Abazaj	(Albania) Luftëtari Gjirokastër	
2018–19	Esat Mala	(Albania) Partizani Tirana	

== Number of awards per player ==
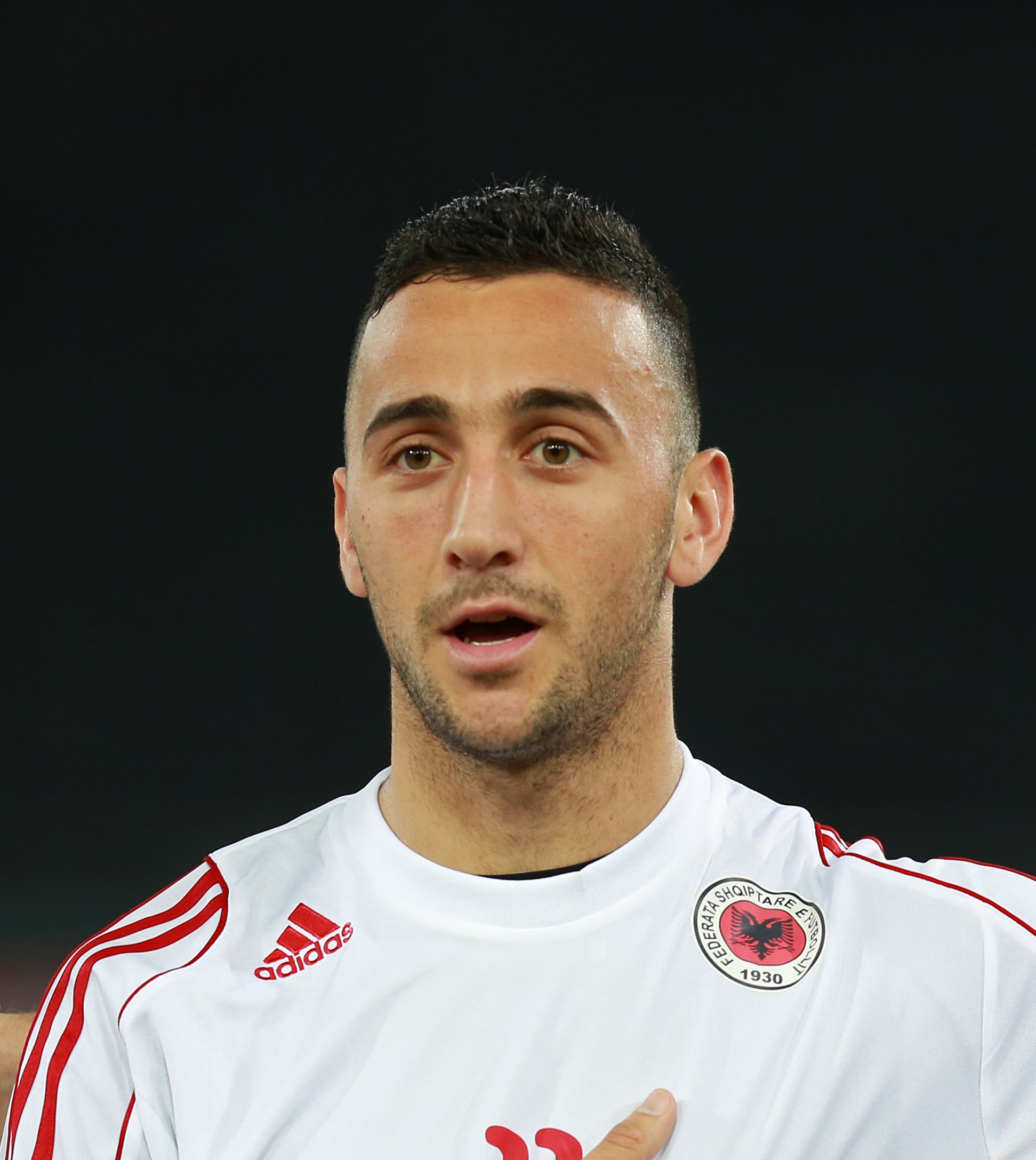
Mario Morina, the 2013–14 winner.

Player	Number	Years
Bekim Balaj	2	2009–10, 2011–12
Kristal Abazaj	1	2017–18
Dejvi Bregu	1	2016–17
Liridon Latifi	1	2015–16
Esat Mala	1	2018–19
Gledi Mici	1	2012–13
Mario Morina	1	2013–14
Odise Roshi	1	2010–11
Amir Rrahmani	1	2014–15
Armando Vajushi	1	2010–11

== See also ==
- Albanian Footballer of the Year
- Kategoria Superiore Player of the Month
