= Armando Vajushi =

Albanian professional footballer

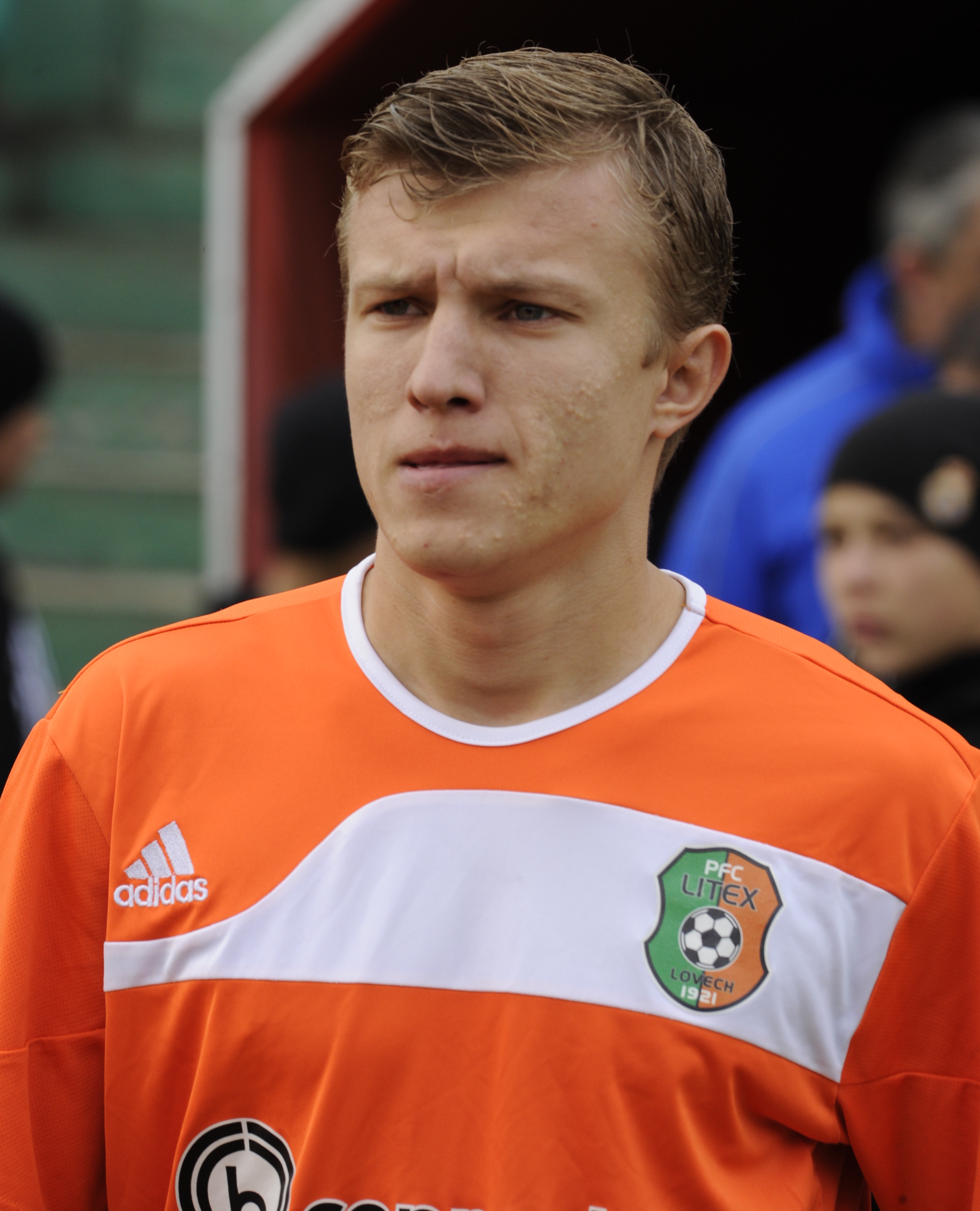
- Vajushi with Litex Lovech in 2012

Personal information
- Date of birth: 3 December 1991 (age 34)
- Place of birth: Shkodër, Albania
- Height: 1.80 m (5 ft 11 in)
- Positions: Attacking midfielder; winger

Youth career
- 2006–2009: Vllaznia Shkodër

Senior career*
Years	Team	Apps	(Gls)
2009–2012	Vllaznia Shkodër	56	(8)
2012–2014	Litex Lovech	86	(22)
2015–2016	Chievo	0	(0)
2015–2016	→ Livorno (loan)	22	(0)
2016–2018	Pro Vercelli	22	(2)
2018	→ Avellino (loan)	9	(1)
2019	Teuta Durrës	9	(0)
2020–2022	Petrolul Ploiești	34	(16)

International career^{‡}
2009	Albania U19	3	(1)
2010–2012	Albania U21	10	(1)
2011–2014	Albania	6	(1)
- * Club domestic league appearances and goals as of 26 November 2021 ‡ National team caps and goals as of 8 June 2014

Armando Vajushi (born 3 December 1991) is an Albanian professional footballer who last played as an attacking midfielder or a winger for Liga I club Petrolul Ploiești.

Vajushi made his senior debut for Vllaznia Shkodër in 2009, aged 17. He moved abroad to Bulgarian club Litex Lovech in January 2012, and three years later earned a transfer to Chievo in Italy. He did not make any appearances for the Gialloblu and spent the following seasons with stints in the Serie B, before returning to Albania with Teuta Durrës in 2019. In 2020, Vajushi joined Petrolul Ploiești in Romania.

Internationally, he registered his full debut for the Albania national team in a 0–4 friendly loss to Argentina in June 2011.

== Club career ==
=== Vllaznia Shkodër ===
Vajushi is a product of the academies of his hometown club Vllaznia Shkodër, where he was part for 3 years before becoming professional.

Vajushi made his professional debut for Vllaznia Shkodër in the Europa League against Rapid Vienna on 16 July 2009, coming on as a 77th-minute substitute for Fetim Kasapi in the 5–0 loss. He made his league debut in the opening game on 23 August 2009 against Besa Kavajë, replacing Ansi Nika in the 72nd minute in the 2–0 loss.

In UEFA.com's season review of 2010–11, Vajushi was the 'One To Watch' and described as "one of the hottest prospects in Albania" after a successful campaign in which he made 32 league appearances for Vllaznia Shkodër and earned his first full international cap with Albania.

He went on trial at German Bundesliga side 1. FC Köln before the start of the 2011–12 season but Köln did not follow up their interest in the player as they deemed his €300,000 price tag too expensive. He even scored twice in a 7-0 friendly against Vorgebirgsauswahl and was described by manager Stale Solbakken as being "very fast, even mentally" and that he was convinced in his ability.

=== Litex Lovech ===
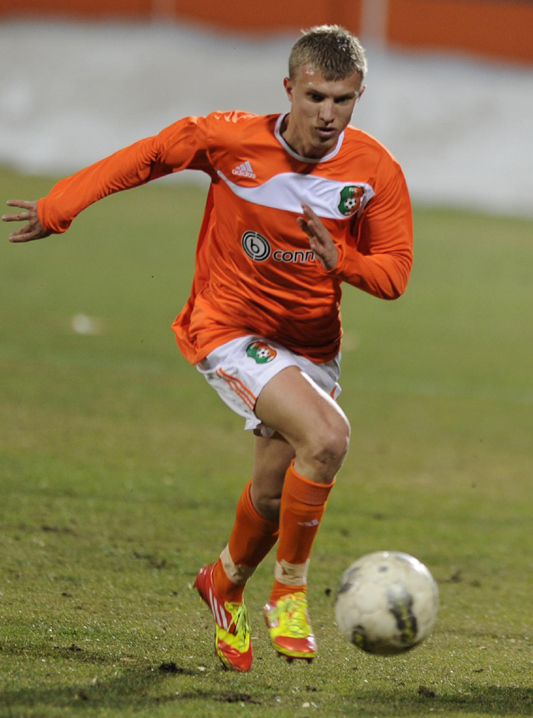
Vajushi playing for Litex Lovech in a league fixture against Vidima-Rakovski, 3 March 2012.

On 3 January 2012, Vajushi joined Bulgarian A PFG title holders Litex Lovech on a three-and-a-half-year contract, for a fee of €100,000. He made his debut in a 3–0 home win over Vidima-Rakovski on 3 March, coming on as a substitute for Galin Ivanov.

On 12 May, Vajushi scored his first goal, netted the fourth for Litex's 5–0 victory over Kaliakra Kavarna. On 2 March 2013, he scored two goals in the 0–2 away win over CSKA Sofia and a few days later he voted by journalists as the player of the Bulgarian A Football Group 16th week. In the 2012–13 season, Vajushi played in all 30 league games for Litex and finished the season with 9 goals. On 10 August 2013, Vajushi scored Litex's 1000th A PFG goal in a 5–1 away win over Pirin Gotse Delchev.

Vajushi finished the first part of the 2013–2014 season with a total of 24 appearances (including 2 in the Bulgarian Cup), 9 goals (were 8 goals scored in the league, positioning in 10th place in the League's rank of Top scorers and 1 goal scored in Bulgarian Cup), also a total of 9 assists, positioning in second place behind Zdravko Lazarov on League's rank of Top assists. Litex were placed as runners-up in the League table and gained entry in the Championship Group, who played with a total of seven teams. Vajushi finished the 2013–2014 season scoring in total 11 goals (including 1 in the Bulgarian Cup) in 33 appearances and Litex ranked 3rd in the league table, gaining entry to play in the UEFA Europa League for the next season.

=== Italy ===
On 1 February 2015 Vajushi signed for Italian Serie A team Chievo Verona becoming the second Albanian player to transfer in Italy during the Winter transfers window, after Andi Lila who moved to Parma.

On 20 July 2016, Vajushi moved to Pro Vercelli.

=== Teuta Durrës ===
On 4 February 2019, Vajushi joined Teuta Durrës on a contract for the rest of the season.

=== Petrolul Ploiești ===
On 22 January 2020, he signed for Romanian club Petrolul Ploiești.

== International career ==
He made his international debut with the Albania national under-19 football team in the UEFA European Under-19 Championship (qualifying round) 2010 on 13 November 2009 in the opening match against Italy, finished in the hard 5–0 loss in where Vajushi came in as a substitute in the second-half 59th minute in place of Edon Hasani.

Vajushi was called up for the Albania national under-21 football team's closing match of the 2011 UEFA European Under-21 Championship qualification - Group 10 against Azerbaijan on 4 September 2010. He made it his debut for Albania U21 against Azerbaijan by coming on as a substitute in the 63rd minute in place of Ardit Shehaj and the match finished in the 3–2 loss. For the 2013 UEFA European Under-21 Championship qualification Vajushi played in 7 out 8 matches, all as a starter where he got substituted off in only 1 match, as Albania U21 came last trailing behind Russia, Portugal, Poland and Moldova, with 1 win and 2 draws, 11 goals scored and 18 conceded.

He made his international debut for Albania national football team on 20 June 2011 in a friendly match against Argentina. Vajushi scored his first goal for Albania on 8 June 2014, playing as a starter against San Marino and scoring the second goal in the 32nd minute, also gave an assist for the opening goal scored by Mërgim Mavraj in the 28th minute.

== Career statistics ==
=== Club ===
As of match played 1 February 2015

Appearances and goals by club, season and competition
Club	Season	League			National Cup		Continental		Total	
Club	Season	Division	Apps	Goals	Apps	Goals	Apps	Goals	Apps	Goals
Vllaznia Shkodër	2009–10	Albanian Superliga	9	0	0	0	2	0	11	0
Vllaznia Shkodër	2010–11	Albanian Superliga	32	3	4	0	0	0	36	3
Vllaznia Shkodër	2011–12	Albanian Superliga	12	5	4	4	4	1	20	10
Vllaznia Shkodër	Total		53	8	8	4	6	1	67	13
Litex Lovech	2011–12	A Group	11	1	1	0	0	0	12	1
Litex Lovech	2012–13	A Group	30	9	5	1	—		35	10
Litex Lovech	2013–14	A Group	30	10	3	1	—		33	11
Litex Lovech	2014–15	A Group	15	2	2	2	4	0	21	4
Litex Lovech	Total		86	22	11	4	4	0	101	26
Chievo	2014–15	Serie A	0	0	0	0	—		0	0
Chievo	Total		0	0	0	0	—		0	0
Career total			139	30	19	8	10	1	168	39

=== International ===
As of match played 8 June 2014

Appearances and goals by national team and year
National team	Year	Apps	Goals
Albania
Albania	2011	1	0
Albania	2012	1	0
Albania	2013	2	0
Albania	2014	2	1
Total		6	1

Scores and results list Albania's goal tally first, score column indicates score after each Vajushi goal.

List of international goals scored by Armando Vajushi
No.	Date	Venue	Cap	Opponent	Score	Result	Competition
1	8 June 2014	Serravalle Stadium, Serravalle, San Marino	6	San Marino	0–2	0–3	Friendly

== Honours ==
Individual

- Albanian Footballer of the Year: 2011
- Albanian Superliga Talent of the Season: 2010–11
- Albanian Superliga Player of the Month: February 2011
