= Johann Bezzina =

Maltese footballer

Personal information
- Date of birth: 30 May 1994 (age 32)
- Place of birth: Malta
- Height: 1.80 m (5 ft 11 in)
- Position: Midfielder

Team information
- Current team: Balzan
- Number: 18

Senior career*
Years	Team	Apps	(Gls)
2011–2019	Hibernians	127	(8)
2015–2016	→ Sliema Wanderers (loan)	29	(2)
2019–2022	Birkirkara	17	(0)
2020–2022	→ Mosta (loan)	31	(1)
2022–2023	Gudja United	14	(3)
2023–2025	Żebbuġ Rangers	24	(10)
2025–	Balzan	8	(0)

International career
2017–	Malta	1	(0)
- * Club domestic league appearances and goals as of 21 April 2026

Johann Bezzina (born 30 May 1994 in Malta) is a Maltese footballer who plays for Balzan of the Maltese Challenge League.

== Career ==
Making his senior debut for Hibernians in a 2-5 loss to Qormi at the age of 16, Bezzina was loaned to Sliema Wanderers in 2015, lifting the Maltese FA Trophy that season. After returning to Hibernians in 2016, the midfielder recorded his 100th appearance in the Maltese Premier League in a 2-0 win over Valletta, consolidating his first team spot in the process.

On 8 January 2019, Bezzina was sold to Birkirkara for a fee around €100,000.
