= Bakovci =

- Location in Slovenia
- Coordinates: 46°36′58.26″N 16°8′44.52″E
- Country: Slovenia
- Traditional region: Prekmurje
- Statistical region: Mura
- Municipality: Murska Sobota

Area
  - Total: 8.97 km^{2} (3.46 sq mi)
- Elevation: 188 m (617 ft)

Population (2016)
  - Total: 1,493

Bakovci (pronounced [ˈbaːkɔu̯tsi]; Hungarian: Barkóc) is a village in the Municipality of Murska Sobota in the Prekmurje region in northeastern Slovenia.
