= Victor Söderström (footballer) =

Swedish footballer

Personal information
- Date of birth: 17 January 1994 (age 32)
- Place of birth: Sweden
- Height: 1.90 m (6 ft 3 in)
- Position: Forward

Team information
- Current team: Vasalund
- Number: 11

Youth career
- 2005: Hammarby IF
- 2005–2010: IF Brommapojkarna

Senior career*
Years	Team	Apps	(Gls)
2011–2014	IF Brommapojkarna	36	(1)
2015–2017	IK Frej	49	(7)
2017–2018	Assyriska FF	45	(9)
2019–2020	Akropolis IF	42	(20)
2021	Dalkurd	25	(7)
2022–	Vasalund	2	(0)

International career
2009–2011	Sweden U17	12	(6)
2012–2013	Sweden U19	15	(6)
- * Club domestic league appearances and goals as of 9 April 2022

Victor Söderström (born 17 January 1994) is a Swedish footballer who plays for Vasalund.

== Career ==
Söderström began his career with Hammarby IF before moving to IF Brommapojkarna in 2005. He made his professional debut against Landskrona BoIS in October 2011 and he established himself in Roberth Björknesjö's squad as they gain promotion to the Allsvenskan in 2012. In July 2013 Söderström had a trial with English side Stoke City.
