= Dominik Mašek =

Czech footballer

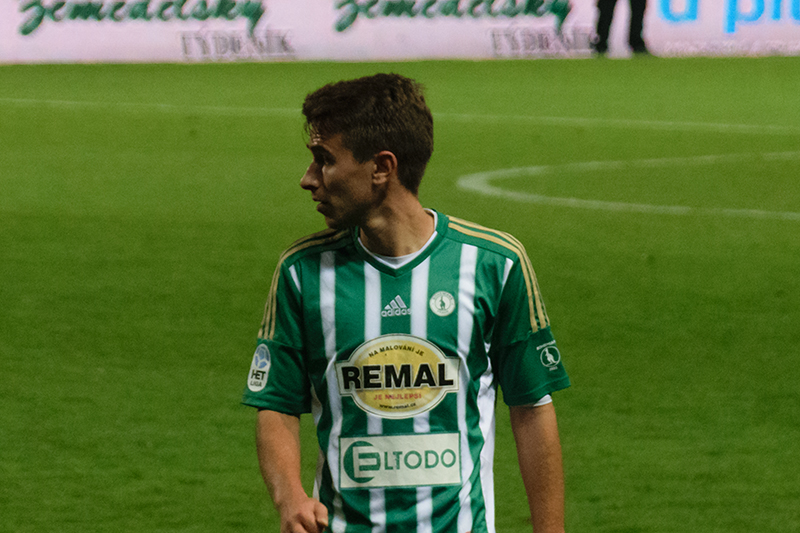

Personal information
- Date of birth: 10 July 1995 (age 31)
- Place of birth: Příbram, Czech Republic
- Height: 1.72 m (5 ft 8 in)
- Position: Winger

Team information
- Current team: Příbram B (manager)

Senior career*
Years	Team	Apps	(Gls)
2010–2012	Příbram	4	(0)
2012–2015	Hamburger SV II	50	(10)
2015–2016	SC Cambuur	2	(0)
2016–2018	Bohemians 1905	68	(10)
2019–2022	Mladá Boleslav	25	(5)
2019	→ Fastav Zlín (loan)	13	(2)
2022	Jablonec	0	(0)
2023	Viagem Příbram	8	(0)

International career
2010–2011	Czech Republic U16	7	(7)
2011–2012	Czech Republic U17	26	(7)
2012–2014	Czech Republic U19	22	(9)
2014	Czech Republic U20	2	(1)
2016–2017	Czech Republic U21	3	(1)

Managerial career
- 2023–: Příbram B
- 2024–: Příbram (assistant)
- * Club domestic league appearances and goals as of 20 June 2023

Dominik Mašek (born 10 July 1995) is a Czech former professional footballer who is the manager of Příbram B.

== Career ==
He made his league debut on 28 May 2011 (age 15 years 322 days) and became the youngest ever Czech First League player, a record he holds to this day.

On 12 July 2023, Mašek announced his retirement from playing due to persistent knee problems. He became manager of reserve team Příbram B.

On 9 May 2024, Mašek was appointed as an assistant of Příbram.
