= Jan Legierski =

Polish Nordic combined skier (born 1952)

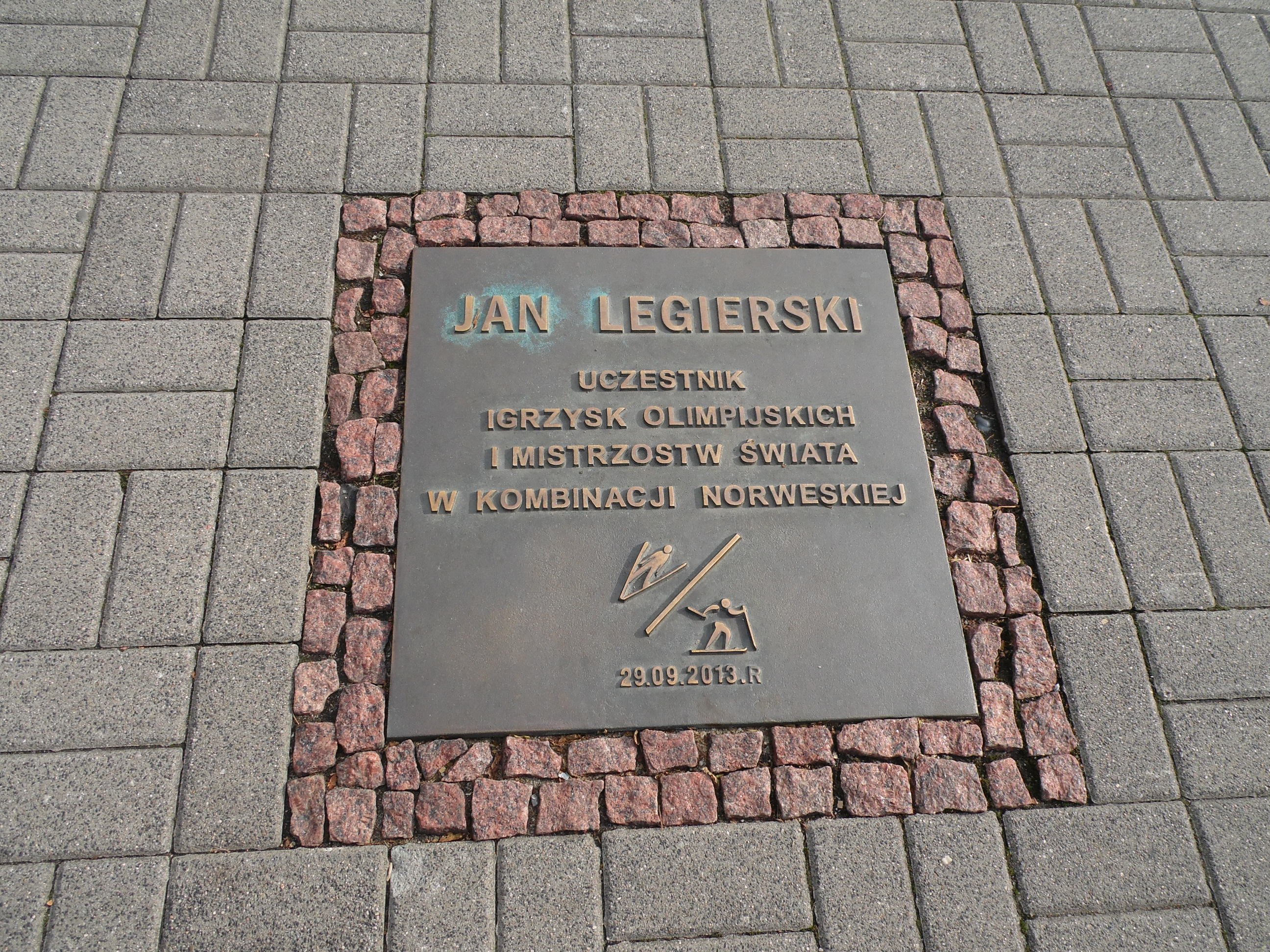

Jan Legierski (born 10 March 1952 in Istebna) is a Polish former Nordic combined skier who competed in the 1976 Winter Olympics and in the 1980 Winter Olympics.
