= Lorenc Shehaj =

Albanian footballer

Personal information
- Date of birth: 7 April 1994 (age 32)
- Place of birth: Vlorë, Albania
- Height: 1.80 m (5 ft 11 in)
- Position: Striker

Youth career
- 2010–2012: Flamurtari Vlorë

Senior career*
Years	Team	Apps	(Gls)
2012–2014	Flamurtari	9	(1)
2014	→ Luftëtari (loan)	5	(1)
2015	Korabi	4	(1)
2016	Butrinti	3	(1)
2016–2017	Apolonia	10	(0)
2017–2018	Oriku		

International career^{‡}
2012	Albania U19	3	(1)
- * Club domestic league appearances and goals as of 17 September 2016 ‡ National team caps and goals as of 14 April 2016

Lorenc Shehaj (born 7 April 1994) is an Albanian professional footballer who most recently played as a striker for Oriku in the Albanian Second Division.

== Club career ==
=== Flamurtari Vlorë ===
Shehaj is a product of Flamurtari Vlorë academy and was called in the first team for the first time in September 2012 for the league match against Shkumbini Peqin which ended in a 1–1 home draw, with Shehaj who remained as an unused substitute. He was called up for another two league matches later that year but still did not make his professional debut. Flamurtari Vlorë finished the season in the 4th position with 46 points, failing to qualify in the European competitions.

In the 2013–14 season, Shehaj was promoted to the first team. He finally made his professional debut at the age of 19 on 27 October 2013 during the 2–1 home win over Kukësi, coming on the field as a 56th-minute substitute for Ardit Shehaj. He was an important instrument in team's run in Albanian Cup, making his debut on 6 November during the 2–0 home win in the returning leg of first round.

On 13 November, Shehaj scored his first league goal for the club during the 4–3 home win over Lushnja, netting a last-minute winner in the 94th after coming on as a second-half substitute. On 18 December, in the second leg of Albanian Cup second round, Shehaj scored his Albanian Cup goals of the season, netting twice in a 4–2 home win to help to team to reach the quarter-finals with the aggregate 6–2.

He ended his second season with the club by making nine league appearances, all of them as a substitute, scoring once in the process. Flamurtari Vlorë ended the season in 7th position by qualified in the 2014–15 UEFA Europa League First qualifying round after winning the Albanian Cup, where he scored twice in three appearances.

=== Luftëtari Gjirokastër ===
On 19 August 2014, Shehaj was sent on a long-season loan to Albanian First Division side Luftëtari Gjirokastër after being told that he was not important for the new season. He made his competitive debut with the club on 25 October 2014 in a 1–0 home win against Bylis Ballsh, where he started the match as a started but was sent off in the 42nd minute after receiving a second yellow card. He scored his first goal for the club on 29 November in his third league appearance against Shkumbini Peqin, where Shehaj netted the first goal of the match in an eventual 2–1 home. Shehaj's spell at the club was short-lived, and after making five league appearances, he left the team.

=== Bylis Ballsh ===
On 14 January 2016, during the winter transfer window, Shehaj agreed personal terms and signed with fellow Albanian First Division side Bylis Ballsh for the second part of 2014–15 season in their bid to achieve promotion. For unknown reasons, Shehaj didn't make a single appearance with the team and left after the end of the season, where Bylis Ballsh successfully achieved promotion to Albanian Superliga.

=== Korabi Peshkopi ===
In September 2015, Shehaj signed with Korabi Peshkopi for the upcoming 2015–16 season. He made his debut on 12 September by playing the last 10 minutes of the 1–0 away defeat to Besëlidhja Lezhë. He scored his first goal for his new club in his second appearance against Kamza, where he again was used only for the final 10 minutes. He was used briefly during the first part of the season, making only four appearances as a substitute, collecting only 25 minutes, leading him to terminate his contract with the club.

=== Butrinti Sarandë ===
On 5 February 2016, Shehaj remained in Albanian First Division after signing with Butrinti Sarandë along with Ardi Qejvani and Serxhio Gjonbrati for the second part of 2015–16 season. On 13 February, Shehaj made his debut with the club by scoring the winning goal against Dinamo Tirana for a 1–0 home victory.

=== Apolonia Fier ===
On 31 August 2016, Shehaj completed a transfer to Apolonia Fier by signing as a free agent.

== International career ==
Shehaj was called up by Albania U19 coach Foto Strakosha for the qualifiers of the 2013 UEFA European Under-19 Championship, where Albania was placed in Group 7 along with Italy, Belgium and Belarus. He made his debut on 12 October 2012 in the first match of the group against Italy, playing the last 11 minutes of a 3–0 away defeat. In the second match, Shehaj played as a starter and scored the third goal for Albania in a 3–1 home win against Belgium for the first three points of the campaign. In the last match, however, Albania was defeated 0–2 at the hands of Belarus, with Shehaj who was used only in the first half of the match. Albania finished Group 7 in the last position with only three points and Shehaj was one of the three goalscorers.

== Personal life ==
He is the younger brother of Ardit Shehaj who plays as a striker for Flamurtari Vlorë. They played together for two seasons.

== Career statistics ==
As of 17 September 2016

Club	Season	League			Cup		Continental		Total	
Club	Season	Division	Apps	Goals	Apps	Goals	Apps	Goals	Apps	Goals
Flamurtari Vlorë	2012–13	Albanian Superliga	0	0	0	0	—		0	0
Flamurtari Vlorë	2013–14	Albanian Superliga	9	0	3	2	0	0	12	2
Flamurtari Vlorë	Total		9	0	3	2	0	0	12	2
Luftëtari Gjirokastër	2014–15	Albanian First Division	5	1	0	0	—		5	1
Luftëtari Gjirokastër	Total		5	1	0	0	—		5	1
Korabi Peshkopi	2015–16	Albanian First Division	4	1	1	0	—		5	1
Korabi Peshkopi	Total		4	1	1	0	—		5	1
Butrinti Sarandë	2015–16	Albanian First Division	3	1	0	0	—		3	1
Butrinti Sarandë	Total		3	1	0	0	—		3	1
Apolonia Fier	2016–17	Albanian First Division	0	0	0	0	—		0	0
Apolonia Fier	Total		0	0	0	0	—		0	0
Career total			21	4	4	2	0	0	25	6

== Honours ==
Flamurtari Vlorë

- Albanian Cup (1): 2013–14
