= Jakub Legierski =

Polish footballer

Personal information
- Full name: Jakub Legierski
- Date of birth: 17 January 1994 (age 32)
- Place of birth: Cieszyn, Poland
- Height: 1.86 m (6 ft 1 in)
- Position: Centre forward

Team information
- Current team: Tempo Puńców
- Number: 11

Youth career
- Trójwieś Istebna
- Olimpia Goleszów
- 2008–2012: MFK Karviná
- 2012–2013: FC Hlučín

Senior career*
Years	Team	Apps	(Gls)
2011–2013	MFK Karviná	10	(0)
2013–2014	MKS Kluczbork	21	(4)
2014	Nadwiślan Góra	12	(1)
2015	Molina		
2015–2018	Tempo Puńców		
2018–2019	TJL Petrovice		
2019	Tempo Puńców	17	(9)
2019–2021	Forteca Świerklany	43	(42)
2021–2024	Tempo Puńców	83	(60)
2024	Drzewiarz Jasienica	15	(4)
2024–	Tempo Puńców	16	(6)

International career
2012	Poland U17	5	(1)
2012	Poland U18	4	(0)
2013	Poland U19	3	(1)
- * Club domestic league appearances and goals as of 15:57, 27 June 2025 (UTC)

Jakub Legierski (born 17 January 1994) is a Polish footballer who plays as a centre-forward for V liga Silesia club Tempo Puńców.

== Honours ==
Tempo Puńców

- Regional league Silesia VI: 2022–23
- Klasa A Skoczów: 2016–17
- Polish Cup (Skoczów regionals): 2021–22, 2022–23
