= Serbia at the 2013 Mediterranean Games =

- IOC code: SRB
- NOC: Olympic Committee of Serbia

in Mersin
- Competitors: 151 in 22 sports
- Flag bearer: Ivana Maksimović
- Officials: Nikola Kuljača
- Medals Ranked 8th: Gold 12 Silver 11 Bronze 11 Total 34

Mediterranean Games appearances (overview)
- 2009; 2013; 2018; 2022

Other related appearances
- Yugoslavia (1951–1991); Serbia and Montenegro (1997–2005); Kosovo (2018–pres.)

Serbia competed at the 2013 Mediterranean Games in Mersin, Turkey from the 20th to 30 June 2013. 151 athletes in 22 sports will represent Serbia.

== Medals by sport ==
Sport	Gold	Silver	Bronze	Total
Swimming	5	0	1	6
Shooting	2	2	3	7
Athletics	1	2	0	3
Rowing	1	2	0	3
Canoeing	1	1	2	4
Judo	1	1	0	2
Handball	1	0	0	1
Wrestling	0	1	2	3
Taekwondo	0	1	1	2
Basketball	0	1	0	1
Bocce	0	0	1	1
Fencing	0	0	1	1
Totals (12 entries)	12	11	11	34

== Medalists ==
Medal	Name	Sport	Event	Date
Gold	Emir Bekrić	Athletics	400 m hurdles	29 June
Gold	Marko Dragosavljević	Canoeing	K-1 200 m	29 June
Gold	Serbia women's national handball team: Jovana Bartošić; Dragana Cvijić; Sandra Filipović; Tamara Georgijev; Ana Kačarević; Katarina Krpež; Maja Radojičić; Sanja Radosavljević; Sanja Rajović; Jovana Risović; Katarina Stepanović; Jovana Stoiljković; Marijana Tanić; Jelena Trifunović; Jelena Živković; Marina Živković	Handball	Women's tournament	29 June
Gold	Aleksandar Kukolj	Judo	−90 kg	22 June
Gold	Iva Obradović	Rowing	Single sculls	23 June
Gold	Zorana Arunović	Shooting	25 m pistol	26 June
Gold	Ivana Maksimović	Shooting	50 m rifle 3 positions	27 June
Gold	Velimir Stjepanović	Swimming	Men's 200 m freestyle	24 June
Gold	Velimir Stjepanović	Swimming	Men's 400 m freestyle	21 June
Gold	Ivan Lenđer	Swimming	Men's 50 m butterfly	24 June
Gold	Ivan Lenđer	Swimming	Men's 100 m butterfly	22 June
Gold	Velimir Stjepanović	Swimming	200 m butterfly	25 June
Silver	Dragana Tomašević	Athletics	Discus throw	29 June
Silver	Tatjana Jelača	Athletics	Javelin throw	28 June
Silver	Serbia national basketball team: Nemanja Arnautović; Darko Balaban; Filip Čović; Miloš Dimić; Đorđe Drenovac; Stefan Jović; Nikola Kalinić; Nikola Malešević; Đorđe Majstorović; Nikola Marković; Stefan Nastić; Stefan Živanović	Basketball	Men's tournament	25 June
Silver	Ervin Holpert, Dejan Terzić	Canoeing	K-2 1000 m	28 June
Silver	Ljubiša Kovačević	Judo	−73 kg	22 June
Silver	Nikola Stojić, Nenad Beđik	Rowing	Pairs	23 June
Silver	Marko Marjanović, Aleksandar Filipović	Rowing	Double sculls	23 June
Silver	Zorana Arunović	Shooting	10 m air pistol	23 June
Silver	Ivana Maksimović	Shooting	10 m air rifle	24 June
Silver	Milica Mandić	Taekwondo	Women's heavyweight	23 June
Silver	Aleksandar Maksimović	Wrestling	−66 kg	22 June
Bronze	Nataša Antonjak	Bocce	Precision throw	26 June
Bronze	Milica Starović	Canoeing	K-1 200 m	29 June
Bronze	Antonija Nađ	Canoeing	K-1 500 m	28 June
Bronze	Smiljka Rodić	Fencing	Individual épée	23 June
Bronze	Damir Mikec	Shooting	10 m air pistol	23 June
Bronze	Jasna Šekarić	Shooting	25 m pistol	26 June
Bronze	Andrea Arsović	Shooting	50 m rifle 3 positions	27 June
Bronze	Čaba Silađi	Swimming	50 m breaststroke	25 June
Bronze	Vanja Babić	Taekwondo	Men's heavyweight	21 June
Bronze	Kristijan Fris	Wrestling	−60 kg	23 June
Bronze	Zaur Efendiev	Wrestling	−74 kg	26 June

== Archery ==
Men

Athlete	Event	Ranking round		Round of 32	Round of 16	Round of 8	Quarterfinals	Semifinals	Final / BM	
Athlete	Event	Score	Seed	Opposition Score	Opposition Score	Opposition Score	Opposition Score	Opposition Score	Opposition Score	Rank
Luka Grozdanović	Individual		16	BYE	7	6	4			5
Marko Jonkić	Individual		31	6	4					26
Nikola Prodanović	Individual		26	6	2					27
Luka Grozdanović; Marko Jonkić; Nikola Prodanović	Team		8	—N/a	—N/a	210	196			8

== Athletics ==
Key

- Note–Ranks given for track events are within the athlete's heat only
- Q = Qualified for the next round
- q = Qualified for the next round as a fastest loser or, in field events, by position without achieving the qualifying target
- NR = National record
- N/A = Round not applicable for the event
- Bye = Athlete not required to compete in round

Men
Track & road events

Athlete	Event	Semifinal		Final	
Athlete	Event	Result	Rank	Result	Rank
Miloš Savić	100 m				
Nemanja Kojić	800 m				
Mirko Petrović	5000 m	—N/a			
Milan Ristić	110 m hurdles				
Emir Bekrić	400 m hurdles				

Women
Track & road events

Athlete	Event	Semifinal		Final	
Athlete	Event	Result	Rank	Result	Rank
Olivera Jevtić	10,000 m	—N/a			
Ana Subotić	10,000 m	—N/a			
Mila Andrić	400 m hurdles				

Field events

Athlete	Event	Final	
Athlete	Event	Distance	Position
Dragana Tomašević	Discus throw		
Tatjana Jelača	Javelin throw		
Ivana Španović	Long jump		

== Badminton ==
Men

Athlete	Event	Group stage				Quarterfinal	Semifinal	Final / BM	
Athlete	Event	Opposition Score	Opposition Score	Opposition Score	Rank	Opposition Score	Opposition Score	Opposition Score	Rank
Ilija Pavlović	Singles								

Women

Athlete	Event	Group stage				Quarterfinal	Semifinal	Final / BM	
Athlete	Event	Opposition Score	Opposition Score	Opposition Score	Rank	Opposition Score	Opposition Score	Opposition Score	Rank
Milica Simić	Singles								

== Basketball ==
=== Men's tournament ===
Team

- Miloš Dimić
- Stefan Jović
- Nikola Marković
- Stefan Živanović
- Nikola Kalinić
- Filip Čović
- Nemanja Arnautović
- Đorđe Drenovac
- Đorđe Majstorović
- Nikola Malešević
- Darko Balaban
- Stefan Nastić

Standings

Qualified for the semifinals

Team	Pld	W	L	PF	PA	PD	Pts
Serbia	2	2	0	157	137	+20	4
Tunisia	2	1	1	141	123	+18	2
Italy	2	0	2	107	145	-38	2

Results

June 18
15:00

Report

Serbia	77–64	Italy
Scoring by quarter: 20–10, 18–17, 19–16, 20–21
Pts: Kalinić 15; Rebs: Dimić, Jović 7 Asts: Jović 5		Pts: Moraschini 20; Rebs: Vitali, Mazzola 4 Asts: De Nicolao, Cournooh 2

Servet Tazegül Arena, Mersin
Referees: Cortes (ESP), Abd El-Moneim (EGY), Denkovski (MKD)

June 21
15:30

Tunisia	vs.	Serbia

Servet Tazegül Arena, Mersin

== Bocce ==
- Uroš Šarac
- Veselin Skakić
- Srđan Butorac
- Nataša Antonjak
- Nada Nedeljković
- Ivana Sajić

== Canoeing ==
Men

Athlete	Event	Heats		Semifinals		Final	
Athlete	Event	Time	Rank	Time	Rank	Time	Rank
Marko Dragosavljević	K-1 200 m						
Milenko Zorić	K-1 1000 m						
Simo Boltić; Marko Dragosavljević	K-2 200 m						
Ervin Holpert; Dejan Terzić	K-2 1000 m						

Legend: FA = Qualify to final (medal); FB = Qualify to final B (non-medal)

Women

Athlete	Event	Heats		Semifinals		Final	
Athlete	Event	Time	Rank	Time	Rank	Time	Rank
Antonija Nađ	K-1 200 m						
Milica Starović	K-1 500 m						

Legend: FA = Qualify to final (medal); FB = Qualify to final B (non-medal)

== Cycling ==
Athlete	Event	Time	Rank
Miloš Borisavljević	Men's road race	3:20:18	25
Miloš Borisavljević	Men's time trial	36:53.84	17
Marko Danilović	Men's road race	3:20:32	34
Marko Danilović	Men's time trial	36:04.65	15
Gabor Kasa	Men's road race	3:20:11	18
Jovan Zekavica	Men's road race	3:20:11	13

== Fencing ==
Men

Athlete	Event	Group stage						Quarterfinal	Semifinal	Final / BM	
Athlete	Event	Opposition Score	Opposition Score	Opposition Score	Opposition Score	Opposition Score	Rank	Opposition Score	Opposition Score	Opposition Score	Rank
Luka Nikolić	Individual épée										

Women

Athlete	Event	Group stage						Quarterfinal	Semifinal	Final / BM	
Athlete	Event	Opposition Score	Opposition Score	Opposition Score	Opposition Score	Opposition Score	Rank	Opposition Score	Opposition Score	Opposition Score	Rank
Smiljka Rodić	Individual épée										3rd place, bronze medalist(s)

== Handball ==
=== Men's tournament ===
Team

- Strahinja Milić
- Dobrivoje Marković
- Nemanja Ilić
- Draško Nenadić
- Bojan Todorović
- Zoran Nikolić
- Miloš Dragaš
- Luka Mitrović
- Nemanja Zelenović
- Ljubomir Jošić
- Mihailo Radovanović
- Mijailo Marsenić
- Miljan Pušica
- Ilija Abutović
- Darko Đukić
- Strahinja Stanković

Preliminary round

Group A
Team	Pld	W	D	L	GF	GA	GD	Pts
Turkey	4	3	0	1	113	107	+6	6
Italy	4	2	0	2	109	100	+9	4
Serbia	4	2	0	2	112	93	+19	4
North Macedonia	4	2	0	2	90	109	−19	4
Algeria	4	1	0	3	95	110	−15	2

=== Women's tournament ===
Team

- Jovana Bartošić
- Ana Kačarević
- Jovana Stoiljković
- Katarina Krpež
- Jovana Risović
- Dragana Cvijić
- Jelena Živković
- Sanja Radosavljević
- Jelena Trifunović
- Sanja Rajović
- Marina Živković
- Tamara Georgijev
- Katarina Stepanović
- Sandra Filipović
- Maja Radojičić
- Marijana Tanić

Preliminary round

Group A
Team	Pld	W	D	L	GF	GA	GD	Pts
Serbia	4	4	0	0	111	86	+25	8
Montenegro	4	2	0	2	81	88	−7	4
Turkey	4	2	0	2	96	98	−2	4
Algeria	4	1	0	3	89	95	−6	2
Italy	4	1	0	3	94	104	−10	2

== Judo ==
Men

Athlete	Event	Round of 16	Quarterfinals	Semifinals	Repechage	Final / BM	
Athlete	Event	Opposition Result	Opposition Result	Opposition Result	Opposition Result	Opposition Result	Rank
Ilija Ciganović	−66 kg						
Ljubiša Kovačević	−73 kg						2nd place, silver medalist(s)
Aleksandar Kukolj	−90 kg						1st place, gold medalist(s)

Women

Athlete	Event	Round of 16	Quarterfinals	Semifinals	Repechage	Final / BM	
Athlete	Event	Opposition Result	Opposition Result	Opposition Result	Opposition Result	Opposition Result	Rank
Ljiljana Savanović	−48 kg						

== Karate ==
Men

Athlete	Event	Round of 16	Quarterfinals	Semifinals	Repechage 1	Repechage 2	Final / BM	
Athlete	Event	Opposition Result	Opposition Result	Opposition Result	Opposition Result	Opposition Result	Opposition Result	Rank
Marko Antić	−60 kg							
Stefan Joksić	−67 kg							
Nikola Jovanović	−75 kg							
Slobodan Bitević	-84 kg							

Women

Athlete	Event	Round of 16	Quarterfinals	Semifinals	Repechage 1	Repechage 2	Final / BM	
Athlete	Event	Opposition Result	Opposition Result	Opposition Result	Opposition Result	Opposition Result	Opposition Result	Rank
Sanja Cvrkota	−61 kg							
Ivana Čomagić	−68 kg							

== Rowing ==
Men

Athlete	Event	Heats		Semifinals		Final	
Athlete	Event	Time	Rank	Time	Rank	Time	Rank
Andrija Šljukić	Single sculls						4
Marko Marjanović; Aleksandar Filipović	Double sculls						2nd place, silver medalist(s)
Miloš Stanojević; Miloš Vereš	Lightweight double sculls						5
Nenad Beđik; Nikola Stojić	Pairs						2nd place, silver medalist(s)

Women

Athlete	Event	Heats		Semifinals		Final	
Athlete	Event	Time	Rank	Time	Rank	Time	Rank
Iva Obradović	Single sculls						1st place, gold medalist(s)

== Sailing ==
Men

Athlete	Event	Race											Net points	Final rank
Athlete	Event	1	2	3	4	5	6	7	8	9	10	M*	Net points	Final rank
Dany Stanišić	Laser													

== Shooting ==
Men

Athlete	Event	Qualification		Final	
Athlete	Event	Points	Rank	Points	Rank
Damir Mikec	10 m air pistol				3rd place, bronze medalist(s)
Damir Mikec	50 m pistol				
Nemanja Mirosavljev	10 m air rifle				
Nemanja Mirosavljev	50 m rifle 3 positions				
Nemanja Mirosavljev	50 m rifle 3 prone				
Dejan Pešić	10 m air rifle				
Dejan Pešić	50 m rifle 3 positions				
Dejan Pešić	50 m rifle 3 prone				
Nemanja Smiljanić	Trap				
Borko Vasiljević	Trap				
Andrija Zlatić	10 m air pistol				
Andrija Zlatić	50 m pistol				

Women

Athlete	Event	Qualification		Final	
Athlete	Event	Points	Rank	Points	Rank
Zorana Arunović	10 m air pistol				2nd place, silver medalist(s)
Zorana Arunović	25 m pistol				
Andrea Arsović	10 m air rifle				
Andrea Arsović	50 m rifle 3 positions				
Ivana Maksimović	10 m air rifle				2nd place, silver medalist(s)
Ivana Maksimović	50 m rifle 3 positions				
Jasna Šekarić	25 m pistol				
Bobana Veličković	10 m air pistol				

== Swimming ==
Men

Athlete	Event	Heat		Final	
Athlete	Event	Time	Rank	Time	Rank
Velimir Stjepanović	50 m freestyle	23.44	12	Did not advance	
Boris Stojanović	50 m freestyle	22.88	6 Q	23.01	8
Velimir Stjepanović	100 m freestyle				6
Boris Stojanović	100 m freestyle				8
Velimir Stjepanović	200 m freestyle				1st place, gold medalist(s)
Stefan Šorak	200 m freestyle				8
Velimir Stjepanović	400 m freestyle	3:54.97	2 Q		1st place, gold medalist(s)
Stefan Šorak	400 m freestyle	3:58.43	14	Did not advance	
Čaba Silađi	50 m breaststroke				3rd place, bronze medalist(s)
Igor Terzić	100 m breaststroke	1:06.14	13	Did not advance	
Čaba Silađi	100 m breaststroke	DNS		Did not advance	
Igor Terzić	200 m breaststroke				7
Ivan Lenđer	50 m butterfly				1st place, gold medalist(s)
Ivan Lenđer	100 m butterfly	52.92	1 Q	52.30	1st place, gold medalist(s)
Velimir Stjepanović	100 m butterfly	54.43	9	Did not advance	
Velimir Stjepanović	200 m butterfly				1st place, gold medalist(s)
Nikola Trajković	200 m medley	2:07.83	9	Did not advance	
Nikola Trajković	400 m medley				

== Taekwondo ==
Men

Athlete	Event	Round of 16	Quarterfinals	Semifinals	Repechage 1	Repechage 2	Final / BM	
Athlete	Event	Opposition Result	Opposition Result	Opposition Result	Opposition Result	Opposition Result	Opposition Result	Rank
Damir Fejzić	−80 kg							
Vanja Babić	+80 kg							3rd place, bronze medalist(s)

Women

Athlete	Event	Round of 16	Quarterfinals	Semifinals	Repechage 1	Repechage 2	Final / BM	
Athlete	Event	Opposition Result	Opposition Result	Opposition Result	Opposition Result	Opposition Result	Opposition Result	Rank
Dragana Gladović	−57 kg							
Milica Mandić	−67 kg							2nd place, silver medalist(s)

== Table tennis ==
Men

Athlete	Event	Round Robin 1				Round Robin 2				Quarterfinal	Semifinal	Final / BM	
Athlete	Event	Opposition Score	Opposition Score	Opposition Score	Rank	Opposition Score	Opposition Score	Opposition Score	Rank	Opposition Score	Opposition Score	Opposition Score	Rank
Marko Jevtović	Singles												
Žolt Pete	Singles												
Marko Jevtović; Žolt Pete	Team					—N/a							

== Volleyball ==
=== Beach volleyball ===
Men's Tournament

Athlete	Event	Preliminary round	Standing	Quarterfinals	Semifinals	Final / BM	
Athlete	Event	Opposition Score	Standing	Opposition Score	Opposition Score	Opposition Score	Rank
Siniša Antonić; Marko Galešev	Men's						
Stefan Basta; Igor Tešić	Men's						

Women's Tournament

Athlete	Event	Preliminary round	Standing	Quarterfinals	Semifinals	Final / BM	
Athlete	Event	Opposition Score	Standing	Opposition Score	Opposition Score	Opposition Score	Rank
Aleksandra Frajtović; Nataša Ševarika	Women's						
Marija Milošević; Isidora Egić	Women's						

== Water Polo ==
=== Men's tournament ===
Team

- Nikola Eškert
- Dušan Vasić
- Nemanja Matković
- Sava Ranđelović
- Viktor Rašović
- Marko Manojlović
- Ognjen Stojanović
- Miloš Maksimović
- Draško Gogov
- Milan Vitorović
- Dimitrije Obradović
- Đorđe Tanasković
- Vojislav Mitrović

Standings

Team	Pld	W	D	L	GF	GA	GD	Pts
Greece	3	3	0	0	32	14	+18	6
Italy	3	2	0	1	26	19	+7	4
France	3	1	0	2	19	24	−5	2
Serbia	3	0	0	3	11	31	−20	0

Results

June 19, 2013; 16:30	Report	Greece	12–3	Serbia	Çiftlikköy Campus Swimming Pool, Mersin; Referees: Matache (ROU) and Kokaragac (TUR)
June 19, 2013; 16:30	Report	Score by quarters: 3 – 1, 1 – 1, 4 – 0, 4 – 1			Çiftlikköy Campus Swimming Pool, Mersin; Referees: Matache (ROU) and Kokaragac (TUR)
June 19, 2013; 16:30	Report	Fountoulis 4	Goals	3 players, 1	Çiftlikköy Campus Swimming Pool, Mersin; Referees: Matache (ROU) and Kokaragac (TUR)

June 21, 2013; 18:00	Serbia	–	Italy	Çiftlikköy Campus Swimming Pool, Mersin

June 22, 2013; 18:00	France	–	Serbia	Çiftlikköy Campus Swimming Pool, Mersin

== Water skiing ==
Men

Athlete	Event	Heat		Final	
Athlete	Event	Points	Rank	Points	Rank
Srđan Dragić	Slalom				
Stefan Fekete	Slalom				

== Weightlifting ==
Athlete	Event	Snatch		Clean & jerk	
Athlete	Event	Result	Rank	Result	Rank
Igor Tomić	Men's −94 kg	135	7	180	6
Silvana Vukas	Women's −63 kg	70	6	95	6

== Wrestling ==
Men's Freestyle

Athlete	Event	Qualification	Round of 16	Quarterfinal	Semifinal	Repechage 1	Repechage 2	Final / BM	
Athlete	Event	Opposition Result	Opposition Result	Opposition Result	Opposition Result	Opposition Result	Opposition Result	Opposition Result	Rank
Zaur Efendiev	−74 kg								3rd place, bronze medalist(s)

Men's Greco-Roman

Athlete	Event	Qualification	Round of 16	Quarterfinal	Semifinal	Repechage 1	Repechage 2	Final / BM	
Athlete	Event	Opposition Result	Opposition Result	Opposition Result	Opposition Result	Opposition Result	Opposition Result	Opposition Result	Rank
Kristijan Fris	−60 kg								3rd place, bronze medalist(s)
Aleksandar Maksimović	−66 kg								2nd place, silver medalist(s)
Davor Štefanek	−74 kg								
