= Rowing at the 2013 Mediterranean Games =

The rowing competitions at the 2013 Mediterranean Games in Mersin took place between 21 June and 23 June at the Çukurova University Boathouse Venues. Çukurova University is in Adana.

Athletes competed in 7 events. Women's lightweight double sculls was cancelled because too few nations applied.

== Medal summary ==
=== Men's events ===
Event	Gold	Silver	Bronze
Single sculls	Francesco Cardaioli; Italy	Dionisis Angelopoulos; Greece	Noureldin Younis; Egypt
Lightweight single sculls	Pietro Ruta; Italy	Hüseyin Kandemir; Turkey	Panagiotis Magdanis; Greece
Double sculls	Italy (ITA); Francesco Fossi; Romano Battisti	Serbia (SRB); Marko Marjanović; Aleksandar Filipović	Slovenia (SLO); Jure Grace; Aleš Župan
Lightweight double sculls	Greece (GRE); Eleftherios Konsolas; Spyridon Giannaros	Turkey (TUR); Enes Kusku; Bayram Sönmez	Italy (ITA); Elia Luini; Andrea Micheletti
Coxless pair	Italy (ITA); Marco Di Costanzo; Matteo Castaldo	Serbia (SRB); Nikola Stojić; Nenad Beđik	Spain (ESP); Pau Vela; Alexander Sigurbjörnsson

=== Women's events ===
Event	Gold	Silver	Bronze
Single sculls	Iva Obradović; Serbia	Giada Colombo; Italy	Marcela Milošević; Croatia
Lightweight single sculls	Aikaterini Nikolaidou; Greece	Laura Milani; Italy	Anna Ioannou; Cyprus
