= Boules at the 2013 Mediterranean Games =

- Venue: Toroslar Bocce Facility
- Location: Turkey, Mersin
- Dates: 25-26 June 2013

The bocce competitions at the 2013 Mediterranean Games in Mersin took place between 25 June and 29 June at the Toroslar Bocce Facility.

Athletes competed in 10 events across 3 disciplines: lyonnaise, pétanque and raffa.

== Medal table ==
* Host nation (Turkey)

Rank	Nation	Gold	Silver	Bronze	Total
1	Italy	4	1	1	6
2	France	2	1	2	5
3	Turkey*	1	2	1	4
4	Tunisia	1	1	0	2
5	Slovenia	1	0	1	2
6	Croatia	1	0	0	1
7	San Marino	0	2	2	4
8	Malta	0	1	0	1
8	Montenegro	0	1	0	1
8	Spain	0	1	0	1
11	Algeria	0	0	2	2
12	Serbia	0	0	1	1
Totals (12 entries)		10	10	10	30

== Medal summary ==
=== Lyonnaise ===
Event	Gold	Silver	Bronze
Men's precision throw	Cedric Roche; France	Miroslav Petkovic; Montenegro	Sidahmed Boufateh; Algeria
Men's progressive throw	Leo Brnić; Croatia	Mauro Roggero; Italy	Ales Borcnik; Slovenia
Women's precision throw	Tadeja Sodec; Slovenia	Melanie Lille; France	Natasa Antonjak; Serbia
Women's progressive throw	Barbara Barthet; France	Seda Geridönmez; Turkey	Virginia Venturini; Italy

=== Pétanque ===
Event	Gold	Silver	Bronze
Men's doubles	Italy (ITA)	Tunisia (TUN)	France (FRA)
Women's doubles	Tunisia (TUN)	Spain (ESP)	France (FRA)

=== Raffa ===
Event	Gold	Silver	Bronze
Men's singles	Pasquale Dalterio; Italy	Matteo Albani; San Marino	Yunus Emre Güngör; Turkey
Men's doubles	Italy (ITA)	Malta (MLT)	San Marino (SMR)
Women's singles	Deniz Demir; Turkey	Anna Maria Ciucci; San Marino	Lamia Aissioui; Algeria
Women's doubles	Italy (ITA)	Turkey (TUR)	San Marino (SMR)
