= Shooting at the 2013 Mediterranean Games =

- Venue: Erdemli Shooting Range
- Dates: 23-28 June 2013

The shooting competitions at the 2013 Mediterranean Games in Mersin took place between 23 June and 28 June at the Erdemli Shooting Range.

Athletes competed in 13 events. Men's 25 metre rapid fire pistol was not held because too few nations applied.

== Medal summary ==
=== Men's events ===
Event	Gold	Silver	Bronze
10 metre air pistol	Pablo Carrera; Spain	Yusuf Dikeç; Turkey	Damir Mikec; Serbia
10 metre air rifle	Niccolò Campriani; Italy	Halil Ibrahim Ozturk; Turkey	Michael d'Halluin; France
50 metre pistol	Yusuf Dikeç; Turkey	Francesco Bruno; Italy	Pablo Carrera; Spain
50 metre rifle prone	Valérian Sauveplane; France	Marco De Nicolo; Italy	Bojan Đurković; Croatia
50 metre rifle three positions	Marco De Nicolo; Italy	Valérian Sauveplane; France	Rajmond Debevec; Slovenia
Skeet	Luigi Agostino; Italy	Georgios Achilleos; Cyprus	Efthimios Mitas; Greece
Trap	Giovanni Pellielo; Italy	Massimo Fabbrizi; Italy	Giovanni Cernogoraz; Croatia
Double trap	William Chetcuti; Malta	Antonino Barillà; Italy	Yavuz İlnam; Turkey

=== Women's events ===
Event	Gold	Silver	Bronze
10 metre air pistol	Céline Goberville; France	Zorana Arunović; Serbia	Petra Dobravec; Slovenia
10 metre air rifle	Petra Zublasing; Italy	Ivana Maksimović; Serbia	Émilie Évesque; France
25 metre pistol	Zorana Arunović; Serbia	Agathi Kassoumi; Greece	Jasna Šekarić; Serbia
50 metre rifle three positions	Ivana Maksimović; Serbia	Petra Zublasing; Italy	Andrea Arsović; Serbia
Trap	Jessica Rossi; Italy	Fátima Gálvez; Spain	Alessandra Perilli; San Marino
