= Taekwondo at the 2013 Mediterranean Games – Men's 68 kg =

The men's 68 kg competition of the taekwondo events at the 2013 Mediterranean Games took place on the 23 of June at the Edip Buran Arena.

== Schedule ==
All times are Eastern European Summer Time (UTC+3).

Date	Time	Round
June 23, 2013	09:00	Preliminaries
June 23, 2013	14:00	Finals

== Results ==
Legend

- PTG — Won by Points Gap
- SUP — Won by Superiority
- OT — Won on over time (Golden Point)

=== Main bracket ===
Preliminary round
Xhersi Kurti (ALB)	2
Ghofran Ahmed (EGY)	19
Killian Platto (MON)	7
Michele Ceccaroni (SMR)	10
Elias El Hayek (LIB)	2
Alexandre Amghar (FRA)	7

Quarterfinals
Servet Tazegül (TUR)	10
Ghofran Ahmed (EGY)	9
Stylianos Papadopo (GRE)	2
Daniel Quesada Barrera (ESP)	8
Michele Ceccaroni (SMR)	0
Claudio Treviso (TUN)	12
Alexandre Amghar (FRA)	6
Neji Ben Ali Gam (TUN)	2

Semifinals
Servet Tazegül (TUR)	7
Daniel Quesada Barrera (ESP)	12
Claudio Treviso (ITA)	10
Alexandre Amghar (FRA)	3

Gold medal match
Daniel Quesada Barrera (ESP)	6
Claudio Treviso (ITA)	2
