= Taekwondo at the 2013 Mediterranean Games =

- Venue: Edip Buran Arena
- Location: Turkey, Mersin
- Dates: 21-23 June 2013

The taekwondo competitions at the 2013 Mediterranean Games in Mersin took place between 21 June and 23 June at the Edip Buran Sports Hall. This was the first time that taekwondo was held at the Mediterranean Games.

Athletes competed in 8 weight categories.

== Medal table ==
* Host nation (Turkey)

Rank	Nation	Gold	Silver	Bronze	Total
1	Spain	3	0	2	5
2	Turkey*	2	2	4	8
3	France	1	1	2	4
4	Morocco	1	1	1	3
5	Egypt	1	0	1	2
6	Italy	0	1	2	3
7	Serbia	0	1	1	2
8	Greece	0	1	0	1
8	Tunisia	0	1	0	1
10	Cyprus	0	0	1	1
10	Lebanon	0	0	1	1
10	Slovenia	0	0	1	1
Totals (12 entries)		8	8	16	32

== Medal summary ==
=== Men's events ===
Event	Gold	Silver	Bronze
Flyweight (58 kg)	Jose Luiz Mendez Jimenez; Spain	Flavien Furet; France	Fırat Pozan; Turkey
Flyweight (58 kg)	Jose Luiz Mendez Jimenez; Spain	Flavien Furet; France	Marcello Porcaro; Italy
Lightweight (68 kg)	Daniel Quesada Barrera; Spain	Claudio Treviso; Italy	Servet Tazegül; Turkey
Lightweight (68 kg)	Daniel Quesada Barrera; Spain	Claudio Treviso; Italy	Alexandre Amghar; France
Middleweight (80 kg)	Issam Chernoubi; Morocco	Oussama Oueslati; Tunisia	Nicolás García; Spain
Middleweight (80 kg)	Issam Chernoubi; Morocco	Oussama Oueslati; Tunisia	Yunus Sarı; Turkey
Heavyweight (+80 kg)	Ali Sarı; Turkey	Alexandros Nikolaidis; Greece	Leonardo Basile; Italy
Heavyweight (+80 kg)	Ali Sarı; Turkey	Alexandros Nikolaidis; Greece	Vanja Babić; Serbia

=== Women's events ===
Event	Gold	Silver	Bronze
Flyweight (49 kg)	Nour Abdelsalam; Egypt	Rukiye Yildirim; Turkey	Kyriaki Kouttouki; Cyprus
Flyweight (49 kg)	Nour Abdelsalam; Egypt	Rukiye Yildirim; Turkey	Ana Petrušič; Slovenia
Lightweight (57 kg)	Eva Calvo; Spain	Hatice Kübra İlgün; Turkey	Andrea Paoli; Lebanon
Lightweight (57 kg)	Eva Calvo; Spain	Hatice Kübra İlgün; Turkey	Lamyaa Bekkali; Morocco
Middleweight (67 kg)	Nur Tatar; Turkey	Hakima El Meslahy; Morocco	Hedaya Wahba; Egypt
Middleweight (67 kg)	Nur Tatar; Turkey	Hakima El Meslahy; Morocco	Haby Niare; France
Heavyweight (+67 kg)	Maeva Meiller; France	Milica Mandić; Serbia	Yaprak Eriş; Turkey
Heavyweight (+67 kg)	Maeva Meiller; France	Milica Mandić; Serbia	Rosana Simon Alamo; Spain
