= Taekwondo at the 2013 Mediterranean Games – Men's 80 kg =

The men's 80 kg competition of the taekwondo events at the 2013 Mediterranean Games took place on the 22 of June at the Edip Buran Arena.

== Schedule ==
All times are Eastern European Summer Time (UTC+3).

Date	Time	Round
June 22, 2013	09:00	Preliminaries
June 22, 2013	14:00	Finals

== Results ==
Legend

- PTG — Won by Points Gap
- SUP — Won by Superiority
- OT — Won on over time (Golden Point)

=== Main bracket ===
Preliminary round
Armin Gredić (BIH)	13
Simone Cannellino (ITA)	2
Karim Abdelraziek (EGY)	5
Taha Fawzi Mo Al Aswed (LBA)	2
Michel Samaha (LIB)	8
Aleksandar Veljanovski (MKD)	0
Michael Munier (FRA)	2
Damir Fejzić (SRB)	3

Quarterfinals
Nicolás García (ESP)	16
Armin Gredić (BIH)	5
Karim Abdelraziek (EGY)	6
Oussama Oueslati (TUN)	9
Yunus Sarı (TUR)	5
Michel Samaha (LIB)	4
Damir Fejzić (SRB)	8
Issam Chernoubi (MAR)	10

Semifinals
Nicolás García (ESP)	1
Oussama Oueslati (TUN)	2
Yunus Sarı (TUR)	2
Issam Chernoubi (MAR)	3

Gold medal match
Oussama Oueslati (TUN)	1
Issam Chernoubi (MAR)	6
