= Aleksandar Filipović =

Aleksandar Filipović may refer to:

- Aleksandar Filipović (rower) (born 1992), Serbian rower
- Aleksandar Filipović (footballer) (born 1994), Serbian professional footballer
