= Rowing at the 2013 Mediterranean Games – Men's double sculls =

The men's double sculls rowing event at the 2013 Mediterranean Games were held from June 21–23 at the Seyhan Dam in Adana.

== Schedule ==
All times are Eastern European Summer Time (UTC+3).

Date	Time	Round
June 21, 2013	10:00	Heats
June 23, 2013	10:00	Final A

== Results ==
=== Heat 1 ===
Rank	Rowers	Country	Time	Notes
1	Francesco Fossi; Romano Battisti	Italy	6:25.27	FA
2	Marko Marjanović; Aleksandar Filipović	Serbia	6:30.09	FA
3	Moustafa Feyala; Abdelkhalek Elbanna	Egypt	6:36.97	FA
4	Quentin Antognelli; Mathias Raymond	Monaco	6:38.98	FA
5	Jure Grace; Aleš Župan	Slovenia	6:51.49	FA
