= Fencing at the 2013 Mediterranean Games =

The fencing competitions at the 2013 Mediterranean Games in Mersin took place between 21 June and 22 June at the CNR Mersin Yenişehir Exhibitio Centre Hall A.

Athletes competed in 6 events. There were no team events.

== Medal summary ==
=== Men's events ===
Event	Gold	Silver	Bronze
Individual épée	Jean-Michel Lucenay (FRA)	Ahmed Khder (EGY)	Enrico Garozzo (ITA)
Individual épée	Jean-Michel Lucenay (FRA)	Ahmed Khder (EGY)	José Luis Abajo Gómez (ESP)
Individual foil	Giorgio Avola (ITA)	Enzo Lefort (FRA)	Valerio Aspromonte (ITA)
Individual foil	Giorgio Avola (ITA)	Enzo Lefort (FRA)	Alaaeldin Abouelkassem (EGY)
Individual sabre	Luigi Samele (ITA)	Vincent Anstett (FRA)	Boladé Apithy (FRA)
Individual sabre	Luigi Samele (ITA)	Vincent Anstett (FRA)	Fernando Casares Montoya (ESP)

=== Women's events ===
Event	Gold	Silver	Bronze
Individual épée	Rossella Fiamingo (ITA)	Sarra Besbes (TUN)	Maya Mansouri (TUN)
Individual épée	Rossella Fiamingo (ITA)	Sarra Besbes (TUN)	Smiljka Rodić (SRB)
Individual foil	Elisa Di Francisca (ITA)	Inès Boubakri (TUN)	Carolina Erba (ITA)
Individual foil	Elisa Di Francisca (ITA)	Inès Boubakri (TUN)	İrem Karamete (TUR)
Individual sabre	Cécilia Berder (FRA)	Livia Stagni (ITA)	Azza Besbes (TUN)
Individual sabre	Cécilia Berder (FRA)	Livia Stagni (ITA)	Vassiliki Vougiouka (GRE)

=== Medal table ===
Key:

* Host nation (Turkey)

Rank	Nation	Gold	Silver	Bronze	Total
1	Italy	4	1	3	8
2	France	2	2	1	5
3	Tunisia	0	2	2	4
4	Egypt	0	1	1	2
5	Spain	0	0	2	2
6	Greece	0	0	1	1
6	Serbia	0	0	1	1
6	Turkey*	0	0	1	1
Totals (8 entries)		6	6	12	24
