= Canoeing at the 2013 Mediterranean Games =

The canoeing competitions at the 2013 Mediterranean Games in Mersin took place between 27 June and 29 June at the Çukurova University Boathouse Venues.

Athletes competed in 6 sprint kayak events.

== Medal summary ==
=== Men's events ===
Event	Gold	Silver	Bronze
K-1 200m	Marko Dragosavljević; Serbia	Manfredi Rizza; Italy	Saúl Craviotto; Spain
K-1 1000m	Francisco Cubelos; Spain	Jošt Zakrajšek; Slovenia	Mauro Crenna; Italy
K-2 200m	Spain (ESP); Saúl Craviotto; Carlos Pérez	Italy (ITA); Mauro Pra Floriani; Mauro Crenna	Turkey (TUR); Çağrıbey Yıldırım; Serhat Kadir Yılmaz
K-2 1000m	Italy (ITA); Nicola Ripamonti; Albino Massimiliano Battelli	Serbia (SRB); Ervin Holpert; Dejan Terzić	Spain (ESP); Emilio Llamedo; Diego Cosgaya

=== Women's events ===
Event	Gold	Silver	Bronze
K-1 200m	Špela Ponomarenko Janić; Slovenia	Norma Murabito; Italy	Milica Starović; Serbia
K-1 500m	Špela Ponomarenko Janić; Slovenia	Sofia Magala Campana; Italy	Antonija Nađ; Serbia

=== Medal table ===
* Host nation (Turkey)

Rank	Nation	Gold	Silver	Bronze	Total
1	Slovenia	2	1	0	3
2	Spain	2	0	2	4
3	Italy	1	4	1	6
4	Serbia	1	1	2	4
5	Turkey*	0	0	1	1
Totals (5 entries)		6	6	6	18
