= Archery at the 2013 Mediterranean Games – Men's individual =

The men's individual competition of the archery events at the 2013 Mediterranean Games was held between June 22 and 24 at the Macit Özcan Sports Complex.

== Schedule ==
All times are Eastern European Summer Time (UTC+3).

Date	Time	Round
June 22, 2013	09:45; 15:30; 16:00; 17:50; 18:20	Qualification; Elimination; Round of 32; Round of 16; Quarterfinals
June 24, 2013	16:10	Semifinals/Finals

== Results ==
=== Ranking round ===
Seed	Archer	Score	Seed	Archer	Score	Seed	Archer	Score
1	Juan Ignacio Rodriguez (ESP)	670	17	Ahmed El-Nemr (EGY)	631	33	Emmanouil Paterakis (GRE)	569
2	Michele Frangilli (ITA)	665	18	Florian Tissot (FRA)	629	34	Jacques El Rayess (LIB)	560
3	Alberto Alfonso Zagami (ITA)	662	19	Stefanos Tserkezis (GRE)	626	35	Jefto Bjelica (MNE)	559
4	Antonio Fernandez (ESP)	654	20	Clement Bonneterre (FRA)	611	36	Paolo Tura (SMR)	549
5	Elias Cuesta (ESP)	651	21	Michail Papavasileiou (GRE)	610	37	Giovanni Paolo Bonelli (SMR)	548
6	Mauro Nespoli (ITA)	651	22	Emanuele Guidi (SMR)	609	38	Yassin Sadeg (ALG)	546
7	Cevdet Dincer Demiral (TUR)	646	23	Klemen Štrajhar (SLO)	607	39	Nikola Vukčević (MNE)	486
8	Jaka Komočar (SLO)	644	24	Mimis El Helali (CYP)	604	40	Jihad Toukan (LIB)	457
9	Yagiz Yilmaz (TUR)	643	25	Ali Arebi (LBA)	603			
10	Thomas Koenig (FRA)	641	26	Nikola Prodanović (SRB)	602			
11	Ibrahim Sabry (EGY)	640	27	Mostafa Rabaa (LBA)	598			
12	Fatih Bozlar (TUR)	639	28	Mounir Megherbi (ALG)	597			
13	Hady El-Khoulosy (EGY)	638	29	Konstantinos Loizou (CYP)	596			
14	Charalambos Charalambous (CYP)	637	30	Petar Janevski (MKD)	590			
15	Jan Rijavec (SLO)	633	31	Marko Jonkić (SRB)	581			
16	Luka Grozdanović (SRB)	631	32	Pavle Radević (MNE)	572			

=== Competition rounds ===
==== Finals ====
Semifinals
Yagiz Yilmaz (TUR)	4
Antonio Fernandez (ESP)	6
Alberto Zagami (ITA)	3
Michele Frangilli (ITA)	7

Final
Antonio Fernandez (ESP)	6
Michele Frangilli (ITA)	5
Bronze medal match
Yagiz Yilmaz (TUR)	4
Alberto Zagami (ITA)	6

==== Section 1 ====
Round of 64
1	J Rodriguez (ESP)
Bye
33	E Paterakis (GRE)	6
32	P Radević (MNE)	0
17	A El-Nemr (EGY)
Bye
Bye
16	L Grozdanović (SRB)
9	Y Yilmaz (TUR)
Bye
Bye
24	M El Helali (CYP)
25	A Arebi (LBA)	6
40	J Toukan (LIB)
2
15

Round of 32

Round of 16

Quarterfinals

==== Section 2 ====
Round of 64
5	E Cuesta (ESP)
Bye
37	G Bonelli (SMR)	6
28	M Megherbi (ALG)
5
12
4
13
6
11
3
14
7
10
2
15

Round of 32

Round of 16

Quarterfinals
