= 2015 World Taekwondo Championships – Men's featherweight =

Taekwondo competition

Men's featherweight at the 2015 World Championships
- Venue: Traktor Ice Arena
- Dates: 14–15 May 2015
- Competitors: 79 from 78 nations

Medalists
gold medal	Servet Tazegül	Turkey
silver medal	Aleksey Denisenko	Russia
bronze medal	José Antonio Rosillo	Spain
bronze medal	Shin Dong-yun	South Korea

The men's featherweight is a competition featured at the 2015 World Taekwondo Championships, and was held at the Traktor Ice Arena in Chelyabinsk, Russia on May 14 and May 15.

Featherweights were limited to a maximum of 68 kilograms in body mass.

== Results ==
Legend

- DQ — Won by disqualification

=== Finals ===
Quarterfinals		Semifinals		Final
Aleksey Denisenko (RUS)	5
Aykhan Taghizade (AZE)	1	Aleksey Denisenko (RUS)	4
Sergey Vardazaryan (ARM)	3	José Antonio Rosillo (ESP)	2
José Antonio Rosillo (ESP)	11			Aleksey Denisenko (RUS)	7
Servet Tazegül (TUR)	13			Servet Tazegül (TUR)	10
Terrence Jennings (USA)	11	Servet Tazegül (TUR)	16
Filip Grgić (CRO)	5	Shin Dong-yun (KOR)	13
Shin Dong-yun (KOR)	14

=== Top half ===
==== Section 1 ====
Round of 128
Robert Amzoiu (ROU)	3
Ahmad Abughaush (JOR)	10

Round of 64
Aleksey Denisenko (RUS)	9
Ahmad Abughaush (JOR)	3
Peken Logbo (CIV)	13
Stylianos Mechteridis (GRE)	14
Nicholas Corten (WTF)	15
Michele Ceccaroni (SMR)	3
~~Emran Sarwari (AFG)~~
Hamza Adnan-Karim (GER)	DQ

Round of 32
Aleksey Denisenko (RUS)	15
Stylianos Mechteridis (GRE)	3
Nicholas Corten (WTF)	7
Hamza Adnan-Karim (GER)	8

Round of 16
Aleksey Denisenko (RUS)	14
Hamza Adnan-Karim (GER)	13

==== Section 2 ====
Round of 128
Mark Lee (LBR)	1
Saud Al-Muwallad (KSA)	17
Pun Chi Fai (MAC)	9
Arman Nukeshtayev (KAZ)	29

Round of 64
Luis Colon (PUR)	14
Saud Al-Muwallad (KSA)	13
Savio Nzeyimana (RWA)	3
Aykhan Taghizade (AZE)	19
Said Gafar Salih (QAT)	DQ
~~Abdalaziz Abdalla (SUD)~~
Arman Nukeshtayev (KAZ)	0
Huang Jiannan (CHN)	11

Round of 32
Luis Colon (PUR)	2
Aykhan Taghizade (AZE)	6
Said Gafar Salih (QAT)	1
Huang Jiannan (CHN)	7

Round of 16
Aykhan Taghizade (AZE)	6
Huang Jiannan (CHN)	5

==== Section 3 ====
Round of 128
Boris Lieskovský (SVK)	8
Sergey Vardazaryan (ARM)	9
Andrés Zelaya (GUA)	DQ
~~Segun Olushola (NGR)~~

Round of 64
Balla Dièye (SEN)	6
Sergey Vardazaryan (ARM)	8
Rafik Zohri (NED)	9
David Boui (CAF)	7
Enes Acikel (AUT)	DQ
~~Emmanuel Wambugu (KEN)~~
Andrés Zelaya (GUA)	22
Raihau Chin (FRA)	14

Round of 32
Sergey Vardazaryan (ARM)	10
Rafik Zohri (NED)	9
Enes Acikel (AUT)	10
Andrés Zelaya (GUA)	6

Round of 16
Sergey Vardazaryan (ARM)	11
Enes Acikel (AUT)	10

==== Section 4 ====
Round of 128
Ziad El-Feky (EGY)	21
Enkhbaataryn Enkhtulga (MGL)	6
Mohamed Boulanouar (MAR)	15
Somsanouk Phommavanh (LAO)	8

Round of 64
Ruebyn Richards (GBR)	13
Ziad El-Feky (EGY)	2
~~Ilyas Belleili (ALG)~~
Karol Robak (POL)	DQ
~~Hryhorii Husarov (UKR)~~
Edgar Contreras (VEN)	DQ
Mohamed Boulanouar (MAR)	3
José Antonio Rosillo (ESP)	6

Round of 32
Ruebyn Richards (GBR)	9
Karol Robak (POL)	10
Edgar Contreras (VEN)	1
José Antonio Rosillo (ESP)	13

Round of 16
Karol Robak (POL)	2
José Antonio Rosillo (ESP)	7

=== Bottom half ===
==== Section 5 ====
Round of 128
Miguel Trejos (COL)	8
Lourenço de Jesus Henriques (TLS)	0
Mbongeni Sibandze (SWZ)	14
Kyss Safou (GAB)	16

Round of 64
Servet Tazegül (TUR)	19
Miguel Trejos (COL)	9
Samba Niang (MLI)	14
Ivan Purešević (SRB)	20
Claudio Treviso (ITA)	DQ
~~Hussein Bahadil (IRQ)~~
Kyss Safou (GAB)	8
Vladimir Dalakliev (BUL)	18

Round of 32
Servet Tazegül (TUR)	10
Ivan Purešević (SRB)	5
Claudio Treviso (ITA)	1
Vladimir Dalakliev (BUL)	6

Round of 16
Servet Tazegül (TUR)	15
Vladimir Dalakliev (BUL)	11

==== Section 6 ====
Round of 128
Phan Trung Đức (VIE)	12
Nurmyrat Berkeliýew (TKM)	7
Jean Moloise Ogoudjobi (BEN)	DQ
~~Thinagaran Naidu Papunaidu (MAS)~~

Round of 64
Vladislav Arventii (MDA)	13
Phan Trung Đức (VIE)	4
Vladislav Khan (UZB)	DQ
~~Ruddy Mateo (DOM)~~
Alexander Ortiz (PER)	1
Jean Segura (CHI)	7
Jean Moloise Ogoudjobi (BEN)	0
Terrence Jennings (USA)	12

Round of 32
Vladislav Arventii (MDA)	9
Vladislav Khan (UZB)	8
Jean Segura (CHI)	8
Terrence Jennings (USA)	10

Round of 16
Vladislav Arventii (MDA)	4
Terrence Jennings (USA)	7

==== Section 7 ====
Round of 128
Uladzislau Halizin (BLR)	14
Kegomoditswe Maponyane (RSA)	1
David Mberna (CHA)	4
Lee Wei-hao (TPE)	6

Round of 64
Filip Grgić (CRO)	14
Uladzislau Halizin (BLR)	13
Conor Grassick (IRL)	6
Ilan Braginski (ISR)	8
Keith Sembrano (PHI)	1
Nuno Costa (POR)	14
Lee Wei-hao (TPE)	6
Maxime Potvin (CAN)	5

Round of 32
Filip Grgić (CRO)	7
Ilan Braginski (ISR)	3
Nuno Costa (POR)	6
Lee Wei-hao (TPE)	7

Round of 16
Filip Grgić (CRO)	8
Lee Wei-hao (TPE)	3

==== Section 8 ====
Round of 128
Viktor Kazinczy (HUN)	1
Aurimas Klemas (LTU)	14
~~Milad Ashna (SWE)~~
Nicolas Tsangarides (CYP)	DQ

Round of 64
Tom Afonczenko (AUS)	10
Aurimas Klemas (LTU)	7
Shin Dong-yun (KOR)	9
Gustavo Almeida (BRA)	4
Alireza Nasr Azadani (IRI)	20
Charles Cromwell (GHA)	7
Nicolas Tsangarides (CYP)	1
Isaac Torres (MEX)	14

Round of 32
Tom Afonczenko (AUS)	6
Shin Dong-yun (KOR)	8
Alireza Nasr Azadani (IRI)	13
Isaac Torres (MEX)	10

Round of 16
Shin Dong-yun (KOR)	9
Alireza Nasr Azadani (IRI)	7
