= Taekwondo at the 2013 Mediterranean Games – Women's +67 kg =

The women's +67 kg competition of the taekwondo events at the 2013 Mediterranean Games took place on the 23 of June at the Edip Buran Arena.

== Schedule ==
All times are Eastern European Summer Time (UTC+3).

Date	Time	Round
June 23, 2013	09:00	Preliminaries
June 23, 2013	14:00	Finals

== Results ==
Legend

- PTG — Won by Points Gap
- SUP — Won by Superiority
- OT — Won on over time (Golden Point)

=== Main bracket ===
Quarterfinals		Semifinals		Gold medal match
		Milica Mandić (SRB)	6
Yaprak Eriş (TUR)	8	Yaprak Eriş (TUR)	2
Maristella Smiraglia (ITA)	7			Milica Mandić (SRB)	2
Seham El-Sawalhy (EGY)	3			Maeva Mellier (FRA)	3
Maeva Mellier (FRA)	13	Rosana Simon Alamo (ESP)	4
		Maeva Mellier (FRA)	5
