= Taekwondo at the 2013 Mediterranean Games – Women's 57 kg =

The women's 57 kg competition of the taekwondo events at the 2013 Mediterranean Games took place on the 21 of June at the Edip Buran Arena.

== Schedule ==
All times are Eastern European Summer Time (UTC+3).

Date	Time	Round
June 21, 2013	09:00	Preliminaries
June 21, 2013	14:00	Finals

== Results ==
Legend

- PTG — Won by Points Gap
- SUP — Won by Superiority
- OT — Won on over time (Golden Point)

=== Main bracket ===
Quarterfinals
Cristina Gaspa (ITA)	5
Andrea Paoli (LIB)	6
Dragana Gladović (SRB)	1
Hatice Kübra İlgün (TUR)	7
Abeer Essawy (EGY)	6
Lamyaa Bekkali (MAR)	10
Floriane Liborio (FRA)	1
Eva Calvo (ESP)	2

Semifinals
Andrea Paoli (LIB)	7
Hatice Kübra İlgün (TUR)	15
Lamyaa Bekkali (MAR)	0
Eva Calvo (ESP)	5

Gold medal match
Hatice Kübra İlgün (TUR)	1
Eva Calvo (ESP)	2
