= Servet Tazegül =

Turkish-Azerbaijani taekwondo practitioner

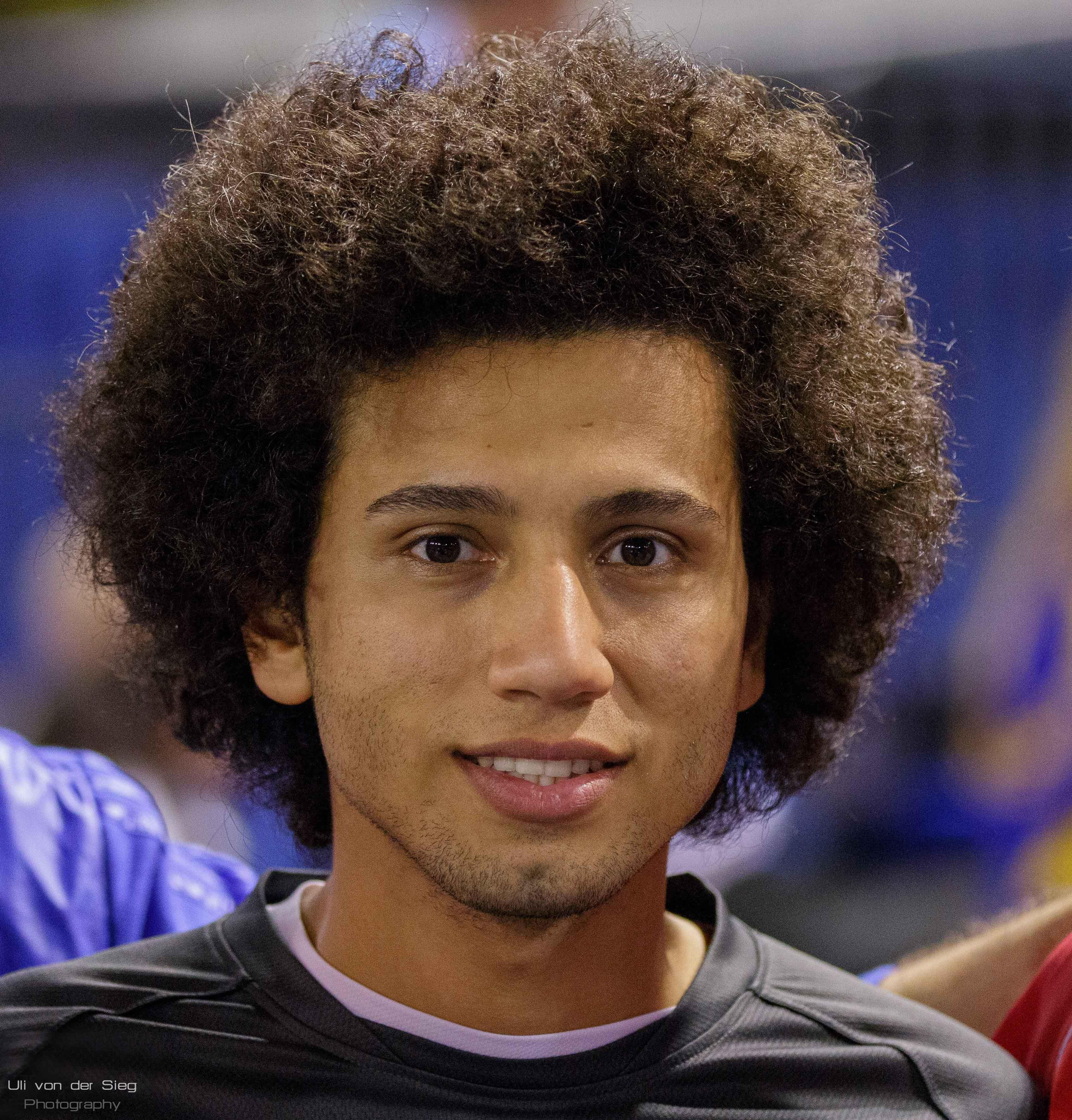
- Tazegül at the Dutch Taekwondo Open, 2014

Personal information
- Nationality: Turkish
- Born: 26 September 1988 (age 37) Nürnberg, Germany
- Height: 1.77 m (5 ft 10 in) (2012)
- Weight: 68 kg (150 lb) (2012)

Sport
- Country: Turkey
- Sport: Taekwondo
- Event: Featherweight (−68 kg)
- Club: Gaziosmanpaşa Belediyesi Gençlik ve Spor Kulübü

Achievements and titles
- Highest world ranking: 1st
Medal record
Men's taekwondo
Representing Turkey
Olympic Games
Gold medal – first place	2012 London	68 kg
Bronze medal – third place	2008 Beijing	68 kg
World Championships
Gold medal – first place	2015 Chelyabinsk	68 kg
Gold medal – first place	2011 Gyeongju	68 kg
Bronze medal – third place	2009 Copenhagen	68 kg
European Championships
Gold medal – first place	2016 Montreux	68 kg
Gold medal – first place	2014 Baku	68 kg
Gold medal – first place	2012 Manchester	68 kg
Gold medal – first place	2010 St. Petersberg	68 kg
Gold medal – first place	2008 Rome	67 kg
Olympic Games Qualification
Gold medal – first place	2011 Baku (World)	68 kg
Gold medal – first place	2008 Istanbul (Europe)	68 kg
Grand Prix
Bronze medal – third place	2015 Manchester	68 kg
Mediterranean Games
Bronze medal – third place	2013 Mersin	68 kg
World Junior Championships
Gold medal – first place	2004 Suncheon	55 kg
European Junior Championships
Gold medal – first place	2005 Baku	59 kg

Servet Tazegül (pronounced [ˈseɾvet ˈtazeˈɟyl] (born 26 September 1988) is a world, Olympic and European champion Turkish taekwondo practitioner of Azerbaijani origin competing in the featherweight division.

He competed in the men's 68 kg class at the 2008 Summer Olympics held in Beijing, China and won the bronze medal. Tazegül qualified for the 2012 Summer Olympics and went on to beat Iran's Mohammad Bagheri Motamed in the final, with a score of 6–5, winning the gold medal.

At the 2013 Mediterranean Games held in Mersin, Turkey, he won the bronze medal in the 68 kg event.

== Recognition ==
A 2013-built, multi-purpose indoor arena in Mersin with 7,500 seating capacity is named in his honor.
