= Swimming at the 2013 Mediterranean Games – Men's 100 metre butterfly =

Men's 100 metre butterfly at the 2013 Mediterranean Games
- Venue: Mersin Olympic Swimming Pool
- Location: Mersin, Turkey
- Dates: 22 June 2013
- Competitors: 18 from 10 nations
- Winning time: 52.30

Medalists
gold medal	Ivan Lenđer	Serbia
silver medal	Matteo Rivolta	Italy
bronze medal	Piero Codia	Italy

The men's 100 metre butterfly competition at the 2013 Mediterranean Games was held on 22 June 2013 at the Mersin Olympic Swimming Pool.

== Schedule ==
All times are Eastern European Summer Time (UTC+03:00)

Date	Time	Event
Saturday, 22 June 2013	9:52	Heats
Saturday, 22 June 2013	18:34	Final

== Records ==
Prior to this competition, the existing world and Mediterranean Games records were as follows:

World record	Michael Phelps (USA)	49.82	Rome, Italy	1 August 2009
Mediterranean Games record	Ivan Lenđer (SRB)	51.79	Pescara, Italy	28 June 2009

== Results ==
=== Heats ===
Rank	Heat	Lane	Name	Nationality	Time	Notes
1	2	4	Ivan Lenđer	Serbia	52.92	Q
2	2	5	Stefanos Dimitriadis	Greece	53.19	Q
3	1	4	Piero Codia	Italy	53.38	Q
4	1	3	Robert Žbogar	Slovenia	53.67	Q
5	3	4	Matteo Rivolta	Italy	53.88	Q
6	1	5	Christos Katrantzis	Greece	53.98	Q
7	2	6	José Cañizares	Spain	54.16	Q
8	2	3	Marwan Hellal	Egypt	54.40	Q
9	3	3	Velimir Stjepanović	Serbia	54.43	
10	3	6	Kaan Türker Ayar	Turkey	54.70	
11	2	2	Carlos Peralta	Spain	55.06	
12	3	2	Abdul Halim Lafci	Turkey	55.28	
13	1	2	Bilal Achelhi	Morocco	55.58	
14	3	1	Andrew Chetcuti	Malta	55.91	
15	3	7	Žiga Cerkovnik	Slovenia	56.36	
16	1	6	Sofyan El Gadi	Libya	58.40	
17	1	7	Abdulmalek Ben-Musa	Libya	1:03.29	
	2	7	Mehdi El Hazzaz	Morocco	DNS	

=== Final ===
Rank	Lane	Name	Nationality	Time	Notes
1st place, gold medalist(s)	4	Ivan Lenđer	Serbia	52.30	
2nd place, silver medalist(s)	2	Matteo Rivolta	Italy	53.04	
3rd place, bronze medalist(s)	3	Piero Codia	Italy	53.18	
4	5	Stefanos Dimitriadis	Greece	53.39	
5	6	Robert Žbogar	Slovenia	53.84	
6	7	Christos Katrantzis	Greece	54.03	
7	1	José Cañizares	Spain	54.26	
8	8	Marwan Hellal	Egypt	54.54	
