= Nemanja Arnautović =

Serbian basketball player

Free agent
- Position: Shooting guard

Personal information
- Born: 14 March 1990 (age 36) Titovo Užice, SFR Yugoslavia
- Listed height: 1.96 m (6 ft 5 in)
- Listed weight: 84 kg (185 lb)

Career information
- NBA draft: 2012: undrafted
- Playing career: 2006–present

Career history
- 2006–2007: Hemofarm
- 2009–2010: Mega Basket
- 2010: Budućnost
- 2010: Crvena zvezda
- 2011–2016: Sloboda Užice
- 2017–2019: Klik
- 2019–2021: Crnokosa
Medals
Men's basketball
Representing Serbia
Mediterranean Games
| Silver medal – second place | 2013 Mersin | Team competition |
Representing Serbia and Montenegro
U16 European Championship
| Bronze medal – third place | 2006 Spain | Team |

Nemanja Arnautović (Serbian Cyrillic: Немања Арнаутовић; born 14 March 1990) is a Serbian professional basketball player.

== Professional career ==
Arnautović played for Hemofarm, Mega Basket, Budućnost, Crvena zvezda, Sloboda Užice, Klik, and Crnokosa.

== National team career ==
In August 2006, Arnautović was a member of the Serbia and Montenegro U16 national team that won a bronze medal at the FIBA Europe Under-16 Championship in Spain. Over seven tournament games, he averaged 0.9 points and 0.1 rebounds per game.

In July 2010, Arnautović was a member of the Serbia U-20 national team at the FIBA Europe Under-20 Championship in Croatia. Over nine tournament games, he averaged 3.3 points and 0.6 rebounds per game. Thereafter, he represented the Serbia at the 2013 Mediterranean Games, with whom he won the silver medal.

== Personal life ==
His surname derives from Arnaut, the Ottoman Turkish ethnonym for Albanians.
