= Weightlifting at the 2013 Mediterranean Games – Men's 56 kg =

The men's 56 kg competition of the weightlifting events at the 2013 Mediterranean Games in Mersin, Turkey, was held on June 21 at the Erdemli Sports Hall. Two sets of medals were divided, for snatch and clean & jerk competitions.

Each lifter performed in both the snatch and clean and jerk lifts, with the final score being the sum of the lifter's best result in each. The athlete received three attempts in each of the two lifts; the score for the lift was the heaviest weight successfully lifted. This weightlifting event was the lightest men's event at the weightlifting competition, limiting competitors to a maximum of 56 kilograms of body mass.

== Schedule ==
All times are Eastern European Summer Time (UTC+3).

Date	Time	Round
June 21, 2013	10:00	Final

== Results ==
6 athletes from five countries took part.

=== Snatch ===
Rank	Name	Group	B.weight (kg)	Snatch (kg)
1st place, gold medalist(s)	Khalil El Maoui (TUN)	A	55.40	115
2nd place, silver medalist(s)	Mirco Scarantino (ITA)	A	55.50	108
3rd place, bronze medalist(s)	Michael Steven Otero (ESP)	A	55.82	107
4	Moustafa Ramo (SYR)	A	56.00	103
5	Michael Di Giusto (ITA)	A	55.80	102
6	Abdelkader Ainouazane (ALG)	A	55.95	94

=== Clean & Jerk ===
Rank	Name	Group	B.weight (kg)	Clean & Jerk (kg)
1st place, gold medalist(s)	Khalil El Maoui (TUN)	A	55.40	142
2nd place, silver medalist(s)	Mirco Scarantino (ITA)	A	55.50	139
3rd place, bronze medalist(s)	Michael Di Giusto (ITA)	A	55.80	132
4	Abdelkader Ainouazane (ALG)	A	56.00	115
—	Michael Steven Otero (ESP)	A	55.82	—
—	Moustafa Ramo (SYR)	A	55.95	—
