= Rowing at the 2013 Mediterranean Games – Men's single sculls =

The men's single sculls rowing event at the 2013 Mediterranean Games was held from June 21–23 at the Seyhan Dam in Adana.

== Schedule ==
All times are Eastern European Summer Time (UTC+3).

Date	Time	Round
June 21, 2013	09:00	Heats
June 22, 2013	09:00	Repechage
June 23, 2013	08:50	Final B
June 23, 2013	09:30	Final A

== Results ==
=== Heat 1 ===
Rank	Rowers	Country	Time	Notes
1	Francesco Cardaioli	Italy	7:22.41	FA
2	Andrija Šljukić	Serbia	7:36.54	R
3	Chaouki Dries	Algeria	7:44.75	R
4	Alhussein Ghambour	Libya	7:45.05	R

=== Heat 2 ===
Rank	Rowers	Country	Time	Notes
1	Dionisis Angelopoulos	Greece	7:06.42	FA
2	Noureldin Younis	Egypt	7:23.18	R
3	Jan Špik	Slovenia	7:28.36	R
4	Mustafa Barbaros Gozutok	Turkey	7:29.11	R

=== Repechage ===
Rank	Rowers	Country	Time	Notes
1	Jan Špik	Slovenia	7:20.85	FA
2	Noureldin Younis	Egypt	7:26.20	FA
3	Mustafa Barbaros Gozutok	Turkey	7:27.65	FA
4	Andrija Šljukić	Serbia	7:33.53	FA
5	Chaouki Dries	Algeria	7:38.52	FB
6	Alhussein Ghambour	Libya	7:39.67	FB

=== Final B ===
Rank	Rowers	Country	Time	Notes
7	Chaouki Dries	Algeria	7:49.65	
8	Alhussein Ghambour	Libya	DNS	

=== Final A ===
Rank	Rowers	Country	Time	Notes
1st place, gold medalist(s)	Francesco Cardaioli	Italy	7:00.53	
2nd place, silver medalist(s)	Dionisis Angelopoulos	Greece	7:02.67	
3rd place, bronze medalist(s)	Noureldin Younis	Egypt	7:03.60	
4	Andrija Šljukić	Serbia	7:04.91	
5	Mustafa Barbaros Gozutok	Turkey	7:12.94	
6	Jan Špik	Slovenia	7:16.24	
