= Judo at the 2013 Mediterranean Games – Men's 90 kg =

Judo Men's 90 kg at the 2013 Mediterranean Games
- Venue: Mersin Gymnastics Hall
- Location: Yenişehir, Mersin, Turkey
- Dates: 22 June

Competition at external databases
- Links: JudoInside

The men's 90 kg competition of the judo events at the 2013 Mediterranean Games in Mersin, Turkey, was held on 22 June at the Mezitli Sports Hall.

== Schedule ==
All times are Eastern European Summer Time (UTC+3).

Date	Time	Round
June 21, 2013	12:00	Preliminaries
June 21, 2013	17:00	Finals

== Results ==
Legend

- 1st number = Ippon
- 2nd number = Waza-ari
- 3rd number = Yuko

=== Bracket ===
Preliminaries
Yunus Süren (TUR)	000
Tadej Mulec (SLO)	120

Quarter Finals
Mohamed Darwish (EGY)	000
Abderahmane Benamadi (ALG)	100
Walter Facente (ITA)	120
Tadej Mulec (SLO)	000
Georges Merheb (LIB)	000
Aleksandar Kukolj (SRB)	100
Pavlos Gkaraklov (GRE)	000
Axel Clerget (FRA)	100

Semi Finals
Abderahmane Benamadi (ALG)	000
Walter Facente (ITA)	100
Aleksandar Kukolj (SRB)	120
Axel Clerget (FRA)	000

Final
Walter Facente (ITA)	001
Aleksandar Kukolj (SRB)	010

=== Repechage round ===
Two bronze medals will be awarded.

Semifinals
Tadej Mulec (SLO)	000
Mohamed Darwish (EGY)	120
Pavlos Gkaraklov (GRE)	000
Georges Merheb (LIB)	010

Finals
Axel Clerget (FRA)	110
Mohamed Darwish (EGY)	000
Abderahmane Benamadi (ALG)	001
Georges Merheb (LIB)	000
