= Toroslar Bocce Facility =

Sports venue in Mersin, Turkey

- Toroslar Bocce Tesisi (Turkish)
- Interactive map of Toroslar Bocce Facility
- Location: Toroslar, Mersin, Turkey
- Coordinates: 36°51′00″N 34°37′32″E
- Owner: Youth Services and Sports Directoriate of Mersin
- Capacity: 1,000

Construction
- Opened: 2013; 13 years ago

Tenant
- Toroslar Belediyespor bocce team

The Toroslar Bocce Facility (Turkish: Toroslar Bocce Tesisi) is a 16-lane indoor sports venue for bocce events at Toroslar district in Mersin, Turkey. Built for use by the 2013 Mediterranean Games and opened in 2013, it is owned by the Youth Services and Sports Directoriate of Mersin having a seating capacity of 1,000.

The facility is home to Toroslar Belediyespor bocce team. Bocce competitions of the 2013 Mediterranean Games were hosted in the venue on June 25–29.

== International competitions hosted ==
In 2024, the venue hosted the European Bocce Women & Mix Championship.
