= Taekwondo at the 2013 Mediterranean Games – Women's 67 kg =

The women's 67 kg competition of the taekwondo events at the 2013 Mediterranean Games took place on the 22 of June at the Edip Buran Arena.

== Schedule ==
All times are Eastern European Summer Time (UTC+3).

Date	Time	Round
June 22, 2013	09:00	Preliminaries
June 22, 2013	14:00	Finals

== Results ==
Legend

- PTG — Won by Points Gap
- SUP — Won by Superiority
- OT — Won on over time (Golden Point)

=== Main bracket ===
Quarterfinals		Semifinals		Gold medal match
		Nur Tatar (TUR)	6
Cristina Rizzelli (ITA)	3	Hedaya Wahba (EGY)	1
Hedaya Wahba (EGY)	9			Nur Tatar (TUR)	10
Dunja Lemajič (SLO)	1			Hakima El Meslahy (MAR)	4
Hakima El Meslahy (MAR)	8	Hakima El Meslahy (MAR)	6
		Haby Niare (FRA)	4
