= Judo at the 2013 Mediterranean Games – Women's 48 kg =

Judo Women's 48 kg at the 2013 Mediterranean Games
- Venue: Mersin Gymnastics Hall
- Location: Yenişehir, Mersin, Turkey
- Dates: 21 June
- Competitors: 6 from 6 nations

Competition at external databases
- Links: JudoInside

The women's 48 kg competition of the judo events at the 2013 Mediterranean Games in Mersin, Turkey, was held on 21 June at the Mezitli Sports Hall.

== Schedule ==
All times are Eastern European Summer Time (UTC+3).

Date	Time	Round
June 21, 2013	12:00	Preliminaries
June 21, 2013	17:00	Finals

== Results ==
Legend

- 1st number = Ippon
- 2nd number = Waza-ari
- 3rd number = Yuko

=== Bracket ===
Quarter Finals		Semi Finals		Final
		Ebru Şahin (TUR)	100
Scarlett Gabrielli (FRA)	100	Scarlett Gabrielli (FRA)	000
Hela Ayari (TUN)	000			Ebru Şahin (TUR)	010
Valentina Moscatt (ITA)	010			Valentina Moscatt (ITA)	000
Ljiljana Savanović (SRB)	000	Valentina Moscatt (ITA)	100
		Sabrina Saidi (ALG)	000

=== Repechage round ===
Two bronze medals will be awarded.

Semifinals
Bye
Hela Ayari (TUN)
Bye
Ljiljana Savanović (SRB)

Finals
Sabrina Saidi (ALG)	000
Hela Ayari (TUN)	100
Scarlett Gabrielli (FRA)	100
Ljiljana Savanović (SRB)	000
