= Filip Grgić =

Croatian taekwondo practitioner

Personal information
- Born: 25 October 1989 (age 36) Zagreb, SR Croatia, SFR Yugoslavia
- Height: 173 cm (5 ft 8 in)
- Weight: 68 kg (150 lb)
- Website: www.filipgrgic.com
Medal record
Representing Croatia
Men's taekwondo
World Championships
Gold medal – first place	2007 Beijing	Bantamweight
European Championships
Silver medal – second place	2012 Manchester	Featherweight
Silver medal – second place	2010 Saint Petersburg	Featherweight

Filip Grgić (born 25 October 1989) is a taekwondo practitioner from Croatia.

Grgić won the gold medal in the men's bantamweight (under 62 kg) class at the 2007 World Taekwondo Championships. He was named the best Croatian sportsmen for 2007 handed out by the Croatian Olympic Committee, along with handballer Ivano Balić.

He won silver at the 2012 European championships in Manchester, United Kingdom, in the Male, Senior, -68 kg category.
