= Jovana Risović =

Serbian handball player (born 1993)

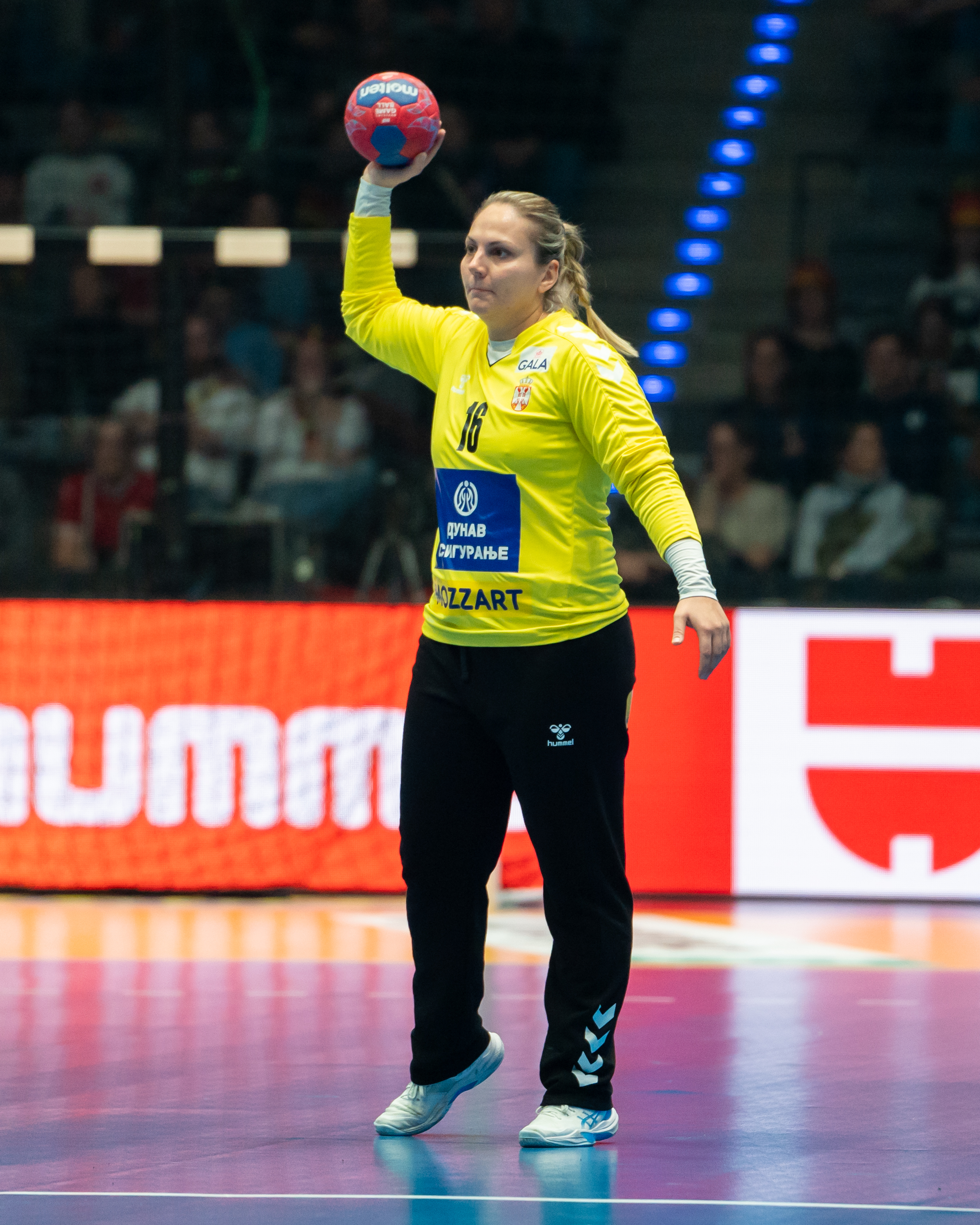
- Risović in 2025

Personal information
- Nationality: Serbian
- Born: 7 October 1993 (age 33) Belgrade, FR Yugoslavia
- Height: 1.71 m (5 ft 7 in)

Sport
- Sport: Handball
- Position: Goalkeeper
- Current club: RK Krim
- Number: 12

Senior clubs
- Years: Team
- 2012–2013: ZRK Max-Sport-Nova Pazova
- 2013–2016: ŽRK Radnicki Kragujevac
- 2016–2017: Randers HK
- 2017–2018: Kecskeméti NKSE
- 2018–2020: RK Podravka Koprivnica
- 2020–: RK Krim
National team
| Years | Team | Apps | (Gls) |
| – | Serbia | 86 | (5) |
Medal record
World Championship
| Silver medal – second place | 2013 Serbia |
Mediterranean Games
| Gold medal – first place | 2013 Mersin | Team |
Universiade
| Bronze medal – third place | 2015 Gwangju | Team |
- Updated on 5 November 2025

Jovana Risović (Serbian Cyrillic: Јована Рисовић; born 7 October 1993) is a Serbian handball player for RK Krim and the Serbian national team.

She won the Danish Cup with Randers HK.

She was a top goalkeeper of the 2012 Women's Junior World Handball Championship.
