= Ivana Maksimović =

Serbian sport shooter

Personal information
- Nationality: Serbian
- Born: 2 May 1990 (age 36) Belgrade, SR Serbia, SFR Yugoslavia
- Height: 1.60 m (5 ft 3 in)
- Weight: 51 kg (112 lb)

Sport
- Country: Serbia
- Sport: Sports shooting
- Events: 10 metre air rifle; 50 metre rifle three positions
- Club: Maksimović Shooting Academy
Medal record
Women's shooting
Representing Serbia
Olympic Games
Silver medal – second place	2012 London	50m rifle TP
World Championships
Bronze medal – third place	2010 Munich	50m rifle TP team
Bronze medal – third place	2014 Granada	10m air rifle team
European Championships
Gold medal – first place	2014 Moscow	10m air rifle team
Gold medal – first place	2015 Maribor	50m rifle TP
Silver medal – second place	2012 Vierumäki	10m air rifle team
Bronze medal – third place	2013 Osijek	50m rifle TP
Bronze medal – third place	2014 Moscow	10m air rifle
Mediterranean Games
Gold medal – first place	2013 Mersin	50m rifle TP
Silver medal – second place	2013 Mersin	10m air rifle
Universiade
Silver medal – second place	2015 Gwangju	10m air rifle team
Bronze medal – third place	2015 Gwangju	10m air rifle

Ivana Maksimović Anđušić (Serbian Cyrillic: Ивана Максимовић Анђушић; born 2 May 1990) is a Serbian sport shooter and Olympic silver medallist, having placed second in the Women's 50 metre rifle three positions event in the 2012 Summer Olympics.

== Early life ==
Maksimović, who originally played tennis as a child, started to shoot when she was eleven.

== Career ==
Maksimović represented Serbia at the 2012 Summer Olympics, most notably winning a silver at the Women's 50 metre rifle three positions. She achieved the best individual round of the competition, but was unable to finish ahead of American Jamie Lynn Gray, who set a new Olympic record in the event, winning by 4.4 points. Maksimović's medal was Serbia's 100th at the Olympic Games.

Maksimović was chosen as 2014 Summer Youth Olympics shooting athlete role model. She was chosen to be the flag bearer for Serbia at the opening ceremony of the 2016 Summer Olympics.

At the 2016 Summer Olympics, she competed in 10 metre air rifle and 50 metre rifle three positions. In the 10 m air rifle competition, she finished in 12th place during the qualification round and did not advance to the final. In the 50 m rifle three positions competition, she finished 19th in the qualification round and did not advance to the final.

After taking part in the 2017 European Shooting Championships in Baku, Maksimović had a two-year break from sports shooting until returning for the 2019 ISSF World Cup in Rio de Janeiro in August 2019.

== Personal life ==
Maksimović is a daughter of Serbian sports shooter and Olympic gold medalist Goran Maksimović. In June 2015, she married basketball player Danilo Anđušić on the Greek island of Santorini. Together with her husband she has two sons, Filip and Uroš.

Olympic Games
Preceded by Novak Djokovic	Flagbearer for Serbia; Rio de Janeiro 2016	Succeeded by Filip Filipović; Sonja Vasić
