= Italy at the 2013 Mediterranean Games =

- IOC code: ITA
- NOC: Italian National Olympic Committee

in Mersin
- Competitors: 419 in 26 sports
- Flag bearer: Jessica Rossi
- Medals Ranked 1st: Gold 69 Silver 52 Bronze 64 Total 185

Mediterranean Games appearances (overview)
- 1951; 1955; 1959; 1963; 1967; 1971; 1975; 1979; 1983; 1987; 1991; 1993; 1997; 2001; 2005; 2009; 2013; 2018; 2022

Italy competed at the 2013 Mediterranean Games in Mersin, Turkey from the 20th to 30 June 2013.

== Archery ==
Men

Athlete	Event	Ranking round		Round of 64	Round of 32	Round of 16	Quarterfinals	Semifinals	Final / BM	
Athlete	Event	Score	Seed	Opposition Score	Opposition Score	Opposition Score	Opposition Score	Opposition Score	Opposition Score	Rank
Michele Frangilli	Individual	665	2 Q	BYE	Jonkić (SRB); W 6–4	Rijavec (SLO); W 7–3	Demiral (TUR); W 7–3	Zagami (ITA); W 7–3	Fernández (ESP); L 5–6	2nd place, silver medalist(s)
Mauro Nespoli	Individual	651	6 Q	BYE	Sadeg (ALG); W 7–3	Sabry (EGY); W 6–0	Zagami (ITA); L 2–6	did not advance		
Alberto Zagami	Individual	662	3 Q	BYE	Janevski (MKD); W 6–0	Charalambous (CYP); W 6–0	Nespoli (ITA); W 6–2	Frangilli (ITA); L 3–7	Yilmaz (TUR); W 6–4	3rd place, bronze medalist(s)
Michele Frangilli; Mauro Nespoli; Alberto Zagami	Team	1978	1 Q	—N/a		BYE	Serbia (SRB); W 212–196	Egypt (EGY); L 213–217	France (FRA); W 219–211	3rd place, bronze medalist(s)

Women

Athlete	Event	Ranking round		Round of 32	Round of 16	Quarterfinals	Semifinals	Final / BM	
Athlete	Event	Score	Seed	Opposition Score	Opposition Score	Opposition Score	Opposition Score	Opposition Score	Rank
Claudia Mandia	Individual	628	5 Q	BYE	Planeix (FRA); L 3–7	did not advance			
Guendalina Sartori	Individual	648	2 Q	BYE	Gaubil (FRA); W 6–5	Kamel (EGY); W 7–3	Valeeva (ITA); W 7–3	Exteberria (ESP); W 7–3	1st place, gold medalist(s)
Natalia Valeeva	Individual	641	3 Q	BYE	Verbič (SLO); W 6–2	Mousikou (CYP); W 6–4	Sartori (ITA); L 3–7	Lokluoglu (TUR); W 6–5	3rd place, bronze medalist(s)
Claudia Mandia; Guendalina Sartori; Natalia Valeeva	Team	1917	1 Q	—N/a		BYE	France (FRA); W 219–202	Spain (ESP); W 210–203	1st place, gold medalist(s)

== Athletics ==
Medal count

Men				Women				Total			
Gold medal	Silver medal	Bronze medal	Tot.	Gold medal	Silver medal	Bronze medal	Tot.	Gold medal	Silver medal	Bronze medal	Tot.
5	2	5	13	7	4	4	14	12	6	9	27

Key

- Note–Ranks given for track events are within the athlete's heat only
- Q = Qualified for the next round
- q = Qualified for the next round as a fastest loser or, in field events, by position without achieving the qualifying target
- NR = National record
- N/A = Round not applicable for the event
- Bye = Athlete not required to compete in round

=== Men ===
Track & road events

Athlete	Event	Semifinal		Final	
Athlete	Event	Result	Rank	Result	Rank
Jacques Riparelli	100 m	10.38	2 Q	10.29	5
Michael Tumi	100 m	10.49	1 Q	10.25	3rd place, bronze medalist(s)
Davide Manenti	200 m	20.90	3 q	20.86	7
Diego Marani	200 m	20.92	1 Q	20.78	4
Matteo Galvan	400 m	46.73	2 Q	45.59	1st place, gold medalist(s)
Lorenzo Valentini	400 m	47.03	4 q	47.37	8
Giordano Benedetti	800 m	1:53.60	8	did not advance	
Meriuhn Crespi	1500 m	—N/a		3:41.19	9
Stefano La Rosa	5000 m	—N/a		DNF	
Daniele Meucci	5000 m	—N/a		13:45.12	4
Ahmed El-Mazoury	10000 m	—N/a		29:59.28	4
Emanuele Abate	110 m hurdles	DNS		did not advance	
Eusebio Haliti	400 m hurdles	50.95	4 q	50.51	5
Patrick Nasti	3000 m steeplechase	—N/a		8:32.46	6
Simone Collio; Davide Manenti; Jacques Riparelli; Michael Tumi	4×100 m relay	—N/a		39.06	1st place, gold medalist(s)
Lorenzo Valentini; Isalbet Juarez; Michele Tricca; Matteo Galvan	4×400 m relay	—N/a		3:04.61	1st place, gold medalist(s)
Andrea Lalli	Half marathon	—N/a		1:10:11	6
Ruggero Pertile	Half marathon	—N/a		1:07:07	2nd place, silver medalist(s)
Federico Mestroni	1500 m T54	3:36.88	4 q	3:35.27	7
Giandomenico Sartor	1500 m T54	3:31.51	3 Q	3:33.59	6

Field events

Athlete	Event	Final	
Athlete	Event	Distance	Position
Emanuele Catania	Long jump	7.92	3rd place, bronze medalist(s)
Daniele Greco	Triple jump	17.13	1st place, gold medalist(s)
Fabrizio Schembri	Triple jump	16.62	3rd place, bronze medalist(s)
Silvano Chesani	High jump	2.28	2nd place, silver medalist(s)
Gianmarco Tamberi	High jump	2.21	6
Giuseppe Gibilisco	Pole vault	5.70	1st place, gold medalist(s)
Giorgio Piantella	Pole vault	5.50	3rd place, bronze medalist(s)
Giovanni Faloci	Discus throw	60.21	5
Norbert Bonvecchio	Javelin throw	72.55	6
Lorenzo Povegliano	Hammer throw	71.41	6
Nicola Vizzoni	Hammer throw	74.86	3rd place, bronze medalist(s)

=== Women ===
Track & road events

Athlete	Event	Semifinal		Final	
Athlete	Event	Result	Rank	Result	Rank
Audrey Alloh	100 m	11.69	3 q	11.67	5
Ilenia Draisci	100 m	11.68	1 Q	11.53	1st place, gold medalist(s)
Libania Grenot	200 m	23.59	1 Q	23.20	2nd place, silver medalist(s)
Chiara Bazzoni	400 m	—N/a		52.06	1st place, gold medalist(s)
Maria Benedicta Chigbolu	400 m	—N/a		52.66	2nd place, silver medalist(s)
Marta Milani	800 m	—N/a		2:04.01	5
Margherita Magnani	1500 m	—N/a		4:06.34	4
Giulia Viola	1500 m	—N/a		4:10.00	6
Elena Romagnolo	5000 m	—N/a		16:11.17	3rd place, bronze medalist(s)
Silvia Weissteiner	5000 m	—N/a		15:44.53	2nd place, silver medalist(s)
Veronica Borsi	100 m hurdles	—N/a		13.05	2nd place, silver medalist(s)
Marzia Caravelli	100 m hurdles	—N/a		12.98	1st place, gold medalist(s)
Francesca Doveri	400 m hurdles	—N/a		56.65	4
Manuela Gentili	400 m hurdles	—N/a		55.89	3rd place, bronze medalist(s)
Giulia Martinelli	3000 m steeplechase	—N/a		DNF	
Touria Samiri	3000 m steeplechase	—N/a		10:01.23	6
Micol Cattaneo; Jessica Paoletta; Ilenia Draisci; Audrey Alloh	4×100 m relay	—N/a		44.66	1st place, gold medalist(s)
Maria Enrica Spacca; Elena Maria Bonfanti; Maria Benedicta Chigbolu; Chiara Bazzoni	4×400 m relay	—N/a		3:32.44	1st place, gold medalist(s)
Valeria Straneo	Half marathon	—N/a		1:11:00	1st place, gold medalist(s)
Anna Eleonora Giorgi	20 km walk	—N/a		1:39:13	1st place, gold medalist(s)

Field events

Athlete	Event	Final	
Athlete	Event	Distance	Position
Tania Vicenzino	Long jump	6.38	3rd place, bronze medalist(s)
Simona La Mantia	Triple jump	13.97	4
Giorgia Benecchi	Pole vault	4.30	5
Laura Bordignon	Discus throw	51.35	7
Silvia Salis	Hammer throw	62.52	3rd place, bronze medalist(s)

== Badminton ==
Athlete	Event	Group Stage					Round of 16	Quarterfinal	Semifinal	Final / BM	
Athlete	Event	Opposition Score	Opposition Score	Opposition Score	Opposition Score	Rank	Opposition Score	Opposition Score	Opposition Score	Opposition Score	Rank
Giovanni Greco	Men's singles	Xanthou (GRE); W 21–19, 21–19	Choueiry (LIB); W 21–8, 21–4	Hölbling (CRO); L 21–13, 11–21, 20–22	Abián (ESP); L 18–21, 16–21	3 Q	Öztürk (TUR); W 21–18, 21–19	Abián (ESP); L 9–21, 8–21	did not advance		
Rosario Maddaloni	Men's singles	Đurkinjak (CRO); L 21–15, 17–21, 21–12	Kiomourtzidis (GRE); W 21–13, 21–5	Lale (TUR); W 21–15, 21–10	Utroša (SLO); L 8–21, 6–21	4	did not advance				
Marco Mondavio; Giacomo Battaglino	Men's doubles	Velázquez / Abián (ESP); L 10–21, 14–21	Choueiry / Abou Alwan (LIB); W 21–9, 21–4	Đurkinjak / Hölbling (CRO); L 13–21, 10–21	—N/a	3 Q	—N/a	Utroša / Horvat (SLO); L 8–21, 14–21	did not advance		
Agnese Allegrini	Women's singles	Yiğit (TUR); L 15–21, 11–21	Le Buhanic (FRA); L 9–21, 22–20, 18–21	Simić (SRB); W 21–13, 21–12	—N/a	3 Q	—N/a	Hosny (EGY); W 21–7, 21–6	Yiğit (TUR); L 13–21, 15–21	Tvrdy (SLO); L 16–21, 16–21	4
Claudia Gruber	Women's singles	Tvrdy (SLO); L 3–21, 12–21	Hosny (EGY); L 21–13, 17–21, 16–21	—N/a		3	did not advance				
Karin Maran; Xandra Stelling	Women's doubles	Yiğit / Bayrak (TUR); L 9–21, 11–21	Lefel / Fontaine (FRA); L 12–21, 6–21	Tvrdy / Končut (SLO); L 12–21, 10–21	—N/a	4	—N/a				

== Basketball ==
=== Men's tournament ===
Team

- Alessandro Amici
- Paul Billigha
- Riccardo Cervi
- David Cournooh
- Andrea De Nicolao
- Stefano Gentile
- Daniele Magro
- Valerio Mazzola
- Riccardo Moraschini
- Nicola Natali
- Michele Vitali
- Andrea Zerini

Standings

Qualified for the semifinals

Team	Pld	W	L	PF	PA	PD	Pts
Serbia	2	2	0	157	137	+20	4
Tunisia	2	1	1	141	123	+18	2
Italy	2	0	2	107	145	-38	2

Results

June 18
15:00

Report

Serbia	77–64	Italy
Scoring by quarter: 20–10, 18–17, 19–16, 20–21
Pts: Kalinić 15; Rebs: Dimić, Jović 7 Asts: Jović 5		Pts: Moraschini 20; Rebs: Vitali, Mazzola 4 Asts: De Nicolao, Cournooh 2

Servet Tazegül Arena, Mersin
Referees: Cortes (ESP), Abd El-Moneim (EGY), Denkovski (MKD)

June 19
15:00

Report

Italy	43–68	Tunisia
Scoring by quarter: 5–12, 13–14, 11–24, 14–18
Pts: Vitali 10; Rebs: Cervi 9 Asts: Moraschini 2		Pts: El Mabrouk, Ghayaza 10; Rebs: Ben Romdhane 11; Asts: Ben Romdhane 3

Servet Tazegül Arena, Mersin
Referees: Yilmaz (TUR), Kaddour (ALG), Ciulin (ROU)

Fifth place match

June 22
15:00

Egypt	40–83	Italy
Scoring by quarter: 15–21, 3–21, 9–23, 13–18

Servet Tazegül Arena, Mersin

== Bocce ==
Lyonnaise

Athlete	Event	Elimination		Quarterfinal		Semifinal		Final / BM	
Athlete	Event	Score	Rank	Score	Rank	Score	Rank	Score	Rank
Diego Rizzi	Men's progressive throw								
Mauro Roggero	Men's progressive throw								
Simone Mana	Men's precision throw								
Laura Cardo	Women's progressive throw								
Virginia Venturini	Women's progressive throw								
Caterina Venturini	Women's precision throw								

Pétanque

Athlete	Event	Group stage					Semifinal	Final / BM	
Athlete	Event	Opposition Score	Opposition Score	Opposition Score	Opposition Score	Rank	Opposition Score	Opposition Score	Rank
Alessio Cocciolo; Diego Rizzi	Men's doubles	Rezoug / Menemeche (ALG); W 11–6	Breton Martin / Lozano Orallo (AND); W 13–9	Lakhal / Bougriba (TUN); L 0–13	Skakić / Sarac (SRB); W 13–4	2 Q	El Mankari / Seghir (MAR); W 13–5	Lakhal / Bougriba (TUN); W 13–7	1st place, gold medalist(s)
Laura Cardo; Serena Sacco	Women's doubles	N/A	Baba Arbi / Bouhnik (ALG); L 9–11	Ben Abdesselem / Beji (TUN); W 8–10	Maillard / Papon (FRA); W 3–13	3	did not qualify		

Raffa

Athlete	Event	Group stage					Semifinal	Final / BM	
Athlete	Event	Opposition Score	Opposition Score	Opposition Score	Opposition Score	Rank	Opposition Score	Opposition Score	Rank
Pasquale d'Alterio	Men's singles	N/A	Sarac (SRB); W 12–1	Rouault (FRA); W 12–3	Farrugia (MLT); W 12–4	1 Q	Güngör (TUN); W 12–4	Albani (SMR); W 12–5	1st place, gold medalist(s)
Pasquale d'Alterio; Diego Paleari	Men's doubles								
Maria Losorbo	Women's singles								
Agnese Agazzi; Maria Losorbo	Women's doubles								

== Boxing ==
Men

Athlete	Event	Round of 16	Quarterfinals	Semifinals	Final	
Athlete	Event	Opposition Result	Opposition Result	Opposition Result	Opposition Result	Rank
Manuel Cappai	Light flyweight	—N/a		Flissi (ALG); L 0–3	Did not advance	3rd place, bronze medalist(s)
Vincenzo Picardi	Flyweight	—N/a	Hajri (TUN); W 3–0	Daraa (MAR); W 3–0	de la Nieve (ESP); L 0–3	2nd place, silver medalist(s)
Ciro Cipriano	Bantamweight	—N/a	Friha (FRA); L 1–2	did not advance		
Fabio Introvaia	Lightweight	BYE	Ouatine (MAR); W 3–0	Oumiha (FRA); L 0–3	Did not advance	3rd place, bronze medalist(s)
Vincenzo Mangiacapre	Light welterweight	Mohamed (EGY); L 1–2	did not advance			
Alfonso Di Russo	Welterweight	—N/a	Risteski (MKD); W 3–0	Abbadi (ALG); L 0–3	Did not advance	3rd place, bronze medalist(s)
Luca Capuano	Middleweight	Venko (SLO); W 3–0	Spanos (CYP); W 3–0	Kılıççı (TUR); L 0–3	Did not advance	3rd place, bronze medalist(s)
Gianluca Rosciglione	Light heavyweight	BYE	Benchabla (ALG); L 0–3	did not advance		
Fabio Turchi	Heavyweight	BYE	Keser (TUR); W 2–1	Arapoglou (GRE); W TKO	Filipi (CRO); W 3–0	1st place, gold medalist(s)
Roberto Cammarelle	Super heavyweight	—N/a	Beganović (MNE); W 3–0	Ahmed (EGY); W 3–0	Demirezen (TUR); W 3–0	1st place, gold medalist(s)

== Canoeing ==
Men

Athlete	Event	Heats		Semifinals		Final	
Athlete	Event	Time	Rank	Time	Rank	Time	Rank
Manfredi Rizza	K-1 200 m	40.366	2 FA	BYE		35.669	2nd place, silver medalist(s)
Mauro Crenna	K-1 1000 m	3:59.360	2 FA	BYE		3:36.735	3rd place, bronze medalist(s)
Mauro Pra Floriani; Mauro Crenna	K-2 200 m	—N/a				33.034	2nd place, silver medalist(s)
Nicola Ripamonti; Albino Battelli	K-2 1000 m	—N/a				3:19.710	1st place, gold medalist(s)

Women

Athlete	Event	Heats		Semifinals		Final	
Athlete	Event	Time	Rank	Time	Rank	Time	Rank
Norma Murabito	K-1 200 m	—N/a				42.158	2nd place, silver medalist(s)
Sofia Campana	K-1 500 m	—N/a				1:54.840	2nd place, silver medalist(s)

Legend: FA = Qualify to final (medal); FB = Qualify to final B (non-medal)

== Cycling ==
Athlete	Event	Time	Rank
Liam Bertazzo	Men's road race	3:21:15	38
Alberto Bettiol	Men's road race	3:30:30	48
Niccolò Bonifazio	Men's road race	3:20:11	16
Ignazio Moser	Men's road race	3:21:15	37
Nicola Ruffoni	Men's road race	3:20:11	1st place, gold medalist(s)
Paolo Simion	Men's road race	3:36:47	50
Daniele Martinelli	Men's time trial	34:01.31	6
Michele Scartezzini	Men's road race	3:23:25	41
Michele Scartezzini	Men's time trial	35:15.97	12

== Fencing ==
Men

Athlete	Event	Group stage						Quarterfinal	Semifinal	Final / BM	
Athlete	Event	Opposition Score	Opposition Score	Opposition Score	Opposition Score	Opposition Score	Rank	Opposition Score	Opposition Score	Opposition Score	Rank
Enrico Garozzo	Individual épée										
Paolo Pizzo	Individual épée										
Valerio Aspromonte	Individual foil										
Giorgio Avola	Individual foil										
Enrico Berrè	Individual sabre										
Luigi Samele	Individual sabre										

Women

Athlete	Event	Group stage						Quarterfinal	Semifinal	Final / BM	
Athlete	Event	Opposition Score	Opposition Score	Opposition Score	Opposition Score	Opposition Score	Rank	Opposition Score	Opposition Score	Opposition Score	Rank
Rossella Fiamingo	Individual épée										
Mara Navarria	Individual épée										
Elisa Di Francisca	Individual foil										
Carolina Erba	Individual foil										
Rossella Gregorio	Individual sabre										
Irene Vecchi	Individual sabre										

== Football ==
=== Men's tournament ===
Team

- Fabio Aveni
- Simone Battaglia
- Davide Biraschi
- Mauro Bollino
- Luigi Canotto
- Eros Castelletto
- Danilo Cataldi
- Daniele Celiento
- Leonardo Citti
- Johad Ferretti
- Andrea Fulignati
- Guido Gomez
- Luca Iotti
- Filippo Minarini
- Giuseppe Palma
- Giulio Sanseverino
- Michele Somma
- Davide Voltan

Standings

Team	Pld	W	D	L	GF	GA	GD	Pts
Tunisia	3	2	1	0	6	3	+3	7
Libya	3	1	1	1	5	5	0	4
Italy	3	1	1	1	8	5	+3	4
Macedonia	3	0	1	2	3	9	−6	1

Results

June 19, 2013
21:45

Italy	v	Tunisia

Tarsus Şehir Stadı, Tarsus

June 21, 2013
18:00

Italy	v	Macedonia

Tevfik Sırrı Gür Stadium, Mersin

June 23, 2013
18:00

Libya	v	Italy

Tarsus Şehir Stadı, Tarsus

== Gymnastics ==
=== Artistic ===
Men
Team

Athlete	Event	Final							
Athlete	Event	Apparatus						Total	Rank
Athlete	Event	F	PH	R	V	PB	HB	Total	Rank
Andrea Cingolani	Team	—N/a							
Ludovico Edalli	Team	14.233 Q	13.733 Q	13.600	14.233	14.600 Q	14.200	84.599	5
Paolo Ottavi	Team	14.166	13.733	14.766 Q	14.200	14.100	14.100	85.065	4 Q
Enrico Pozzo	Team	12.300	13.533	14.033	14.766	14.200	14.600 Q	83.432	10
Paolo Principi	Team	14.766 Q	13.900 Q	13.866	14.500 Q	13.633	14.433 Q	85.092	3 Q
Total	Team	43.165	41.366	42.665	43.499	42.900	43.233	256.828	2nd place, silver medalist(s)

Individual

Athlete	Event	Final							
Athlete	Event	Apparatus						Total	Rank
Athlete	Event	F	PH	R	V	PB	HB	Total	Rank
Paolo Ottavi	All-around	12.966	13.500	14.366	14.133	13.700	14.066	82.731	7
Paolo Principi	All-around	14.633	13.933	13.900	14.400	13.900	14.633	85.399	4

Apparatus

Athlete	Event	Total	Rank
Ludovico Edalli	Floor	13.266	8
Paolo Principi	Floor	14.166	7
Javier Gómez Fuertes	Rings	14.766	7
Ludovico Edalli	Pommel Horse	14.333	5
Paolo Principi	Pommel Horse	14.766	4
Paolo Principi	Vault	14.583	2nd place, silver medalist(s)
Ludovico Edalli	Parallel Bars	14.666	5
Enrico Pozzo	Horizontal Bar		3rd place, bronze medalist(s)
Paolo Principi	Horizontal Bar		

Women
Team

Athlete	Event	Final					
Athlete	Event	Apparatus				Total	Rank
Athlete	Event	F	V	UB	BB	Total	Rank
Giorgia Campana	Team	12.333	14.133	13.766 Q	14.266 Q	54.498	2 Q
Vanessa Ferrari	Team	14.000 Q	13.900	12.666	14.066 Q	54.632	1 Q
Chiara Gondolfi	Team	12.866	—N/a	13.700 Q	13.400	39.966	22
Giulia Leni	Team	—N/a	13.600 Q	13.666	—N/a	27.266	25
Elisabetta Preziosa	Team	13.633 Q	14.000	—N/a	13.366	40.999	21
Total	Team	40.499	42.033	41.132	41.732	165.396	1st place, gold medalist(s)

Individual

Athlete	Event	Final					
Athlete	Event	Apparatus				Total	Rank
Athlete	Event	V	UB	BB	F	Total	Rank
Giorgia Campana	All-around	13.766	13.733	14.066	12.700	54.265	4
Vanessa Ferrari	All-around	13.866	13.700	14.266	14.366	56.198	1st place, gold medalist(s)

Apparatus

Athlete	Event	Total	Rank
Vanessa Ferrari	Floor	13.900	1st place, gold medalist(s)
Elisabetta Preziosa	Floor	13.166	3rd place, bronze medalist(s)
Giulia Leni	Vault	13.599	3rd place, bronze medalist(s)
Giorgia Campana	Uneven Bars	13.700	3rd place, bronze medalist(s)
Chiara Gandolfi	Uneven Bars	14.200	1st place, gold medalist(s)
Giorgia Campana	Balance Beam	14.533	1st place, gold medalist(s)
Vanessa Ferrari	Balance Beam	14.166	3rd place, bronze medalist(s)

=== Rhythmic ===
Athlete	Event	Qualification						Final					
Athlete	Event	Hoop	Ball	Clubs	Ribbon	Total	Rank	Hoop	Ball	Clubs	Ribbon	Total	Rank
Julieta Cantaluppi	All-around	17.183	16.700	17.150	16.917	67.950	4 Q	16.983	16.983	16.917	16.900	67.783	5
Giulia Di Luca	All-around	14.067	15.933	15.967	15.150	61.117	9	did not advance					
Federica Febbo	All-around	17.100	16.967	17.050	17.050	68.167	3 Q	17.000	17.067	17.050	17.033	68.150	4

== Handball ==
=== Men's tournament ===
Team

- Pierluigi Di Marcello
- Vito Fovio
- Luis Felipe Gaeta
- Umberto Giannoccaro
- Pasquale Maione
- Damir Opalic
- Denis Radovcic
- Matteo Resca
- Francesco Rubino
- Valerio Sampaolo
- Michele Skatar
- Tin Tokic
- Dean Turkovic
- Vito Vaccaro
- Francesco Volpi

Preliminary round

Group A
Team	Pld	W	D	L	GF	GA	GD	Pts
Turkey	4	3	0	1	113	107	+6	6
Italy	4	2	0	2	109	100	+9	4
Serbia	4	2	0	2	112	93	+19	4
North Macedonia	4	2	0	2	90	109	−19	4
Algeria	4	1	0	3	95	110	−15	2

=== Women's tournament ===
Team

- Celine Auriemma
- Angela Cappallaro
- Cecilia Carini
- Antonella Coppola
- Eleonora Costa
- Bianca Dal Balzo
- Stefanie Egger
- Rafika Ettaqui
- Irene Fanton
- Sandra Federspieler
- Cristina Georghe
- Beatrice Guerra
- Cristina Lenardon
- Anika Niederwieser
- Giulia Pocaterra
- Monika Prünster
- Gaia Maria Zuin

Preliminary round

Group A
Team	Pld	W	D	L	GF	GA	GD	Pts
Serbia	4	4	0	0	111	86	+25	8
Montenegro	4	2	0	2	81	88	−7	4
Turkey	4	2	0	2	96	98	−2	4
Algeria	4	1	0	3	89	95	−6	2
Italy	4	1	0	3	94	104	−10	2

== Judo ==
Men

Athlete	Event	Round of 16	Quarterfinals	Semifinals	Repechage	Final / BM	
Athlete	Event	Opposition Result	Opposition Result	Opposition Result	Opposition Result	Opposition Result	Rank
Fabio Basile	−60 kg	Bye	Kaba (TUR); L 001–110	did not advance			
Elio Verde	−66 kg	Gušić (MNE); L 000–100	did not advance				
Enrico Parlati	−73 kg						
Massimiliano Carollo	−81 kg						
Walter Facente	−90 kg	Bye	Mulec (SLO); W 120–000	Benamadi (ALG); W 100–000	Bye	Kukolj (SRB); L 001–010	2nd place, silver medalist(s)
Vincenzo D'Arco	−100 kg						
Alessio Mascetti	+100 kg						

Women

Athlete	Event	Round of 16	Quarterfinals	Semifinals	Repechage	Final / BM	
Athlete	Event	Opposition Result	Opposition Result	Opposition Result	Opposition Result	Opposition Result	Rank
Valentina Moscatt	−48 kg						
Elena Moretti	−52 kg						
Martina Lo Giudice	−57 kg						
Edwige Gwend	−63 kg						
Jennifer Pitzanti	−70 kg						
Assunta Galeone	−78 kg						
Tania Ferrera	+78 kg						

== Karate ==
Men

Athlete	Event	Round of 16	Quarterfinals	Semifinals	Repechage 1	Repechage 2	Final / BM	
Athlete	Event	Opposition Result	Opposition Result	Opposition Result	Opposition Result	Opposition Result	Opposition Result	Rank
Luca Maresca	−60 kg							
Gianluca De Vivo	−67 kg							
Luigi Busà	−75 kg							
Nello Maestri	−84 kg							
Stefano Maniscalco	+84 kg							

Women

Athlete	Event	Round of 16	Quarterfinals	Semifinals	Repechage 1	Repechage 2	Final / BM	
Athlete	Event	Opposition Result	Opposition Result	Opposition Result	Opposition Result	Opposition Result	Opposition Result	Rank
Giorgia Gargano	−50 kg							
Selene Guglielmi	−55 kg							
Laura Pasqua	−61 kg							
Chiara Zuanon	−68 kg							
Greta Vitelli	+68 kg							

== Rowing ==
Men

Athlete	Event	Heats		Semifinals		Final	
Athlete	Event	Time	Rank	Time	Rank	Time	Rank
Francesco Cardaioli	Single sculls						
Pietro Ruta	Lightweight single sculls						
Romano Battisti; Francesco Fossi	Double sculls						
Elia Luni; Andrea Micheletti	Lightweight double sculls						
Matteo Castaldo; Marco Di Costanzo	Pairs						

Women

Athlete	Event	Heats		Semifinals		Final	
Athlete	Event	Time	Rank	Time	Rank	Time	Rank
Giada Colombo	Single sculls						
Laura Milani	Lightweight single sculls	7:49.37	1 Q	N/A		7:49.47	2nd place, silver medalist(s)

== Sailing ==
Men

Athlete	Event	Race											Net points	Final rank
Athlete	Event	1	2	3	4	5	6	7	8	9	10	M*	Net points	Final rank
Giovanni Coccoluto	Laser													
Alessio Spadoni	Laser													
Matteo Capurro; Matteo Ramian	470													
Enrico Clementi; Francesco Falcetelli	470													2nd place, silver medalist(s)

Women

Athlete	Event	Race											Net points	Final rank
Athlete	Event	1	2	3	4	5	6	7	8	9	10	M*	Net points	Final rank
Laura Cosentino	Laser Radial													
Martha Faraguna	Laser Radial													
Roberta Caputo; Sveva Carraro	470													
Francesca Komatar; Giulia Paolillo	470													2nd place, silver medalist(s)

== Shooting ==
Men

Athlete	Event	Qualification		Final	
Athlete	Event	Points	Rank	Points	Rank
Niccolò Campriani	10 m air rifle				
Simone Tressoldi	10 m air rifle				
Marco De Nicolo	50 m rifle prone				
Paolo Montaguti	50 m rifle prone				
Marco De Nicolo	50 m rifle 3 positions				
Enrico Pappalardo	50 m rifle 3 positions				
Andrea Amore	10 m air pistol				
Dino Briganti	10 m air pistol				
Francesco Bruno	50 m pistol				
Giuseppe Giordano	50 m pistol				
Massimo Fabbrizi	Trap				
Giovanni Pellielo	Trap				
Antonino Barillà	Double trap				
Davide Gasparini	Double trap				
Luigi Lodde	Skeet				
Valerio Luchini	Skeet				

Women

Athlete	Event	Qualification		Final	
Athlete	Event	Points	Rank	Points	Rank
Sabrina Sena	10 m air rifle				
Petra Zublasing	10 m air rifle				
Antonella Notarangelo	50 m rifle 3 positions				
Petra Zublasing	50 m rifle 3 positions				
Giustina Chiaberto	10 m air pistol				
Susanna Ricci	10 m air pistol				
Maura Genovesi	25 m pistol				
Susanna Ricci	25 m pistol				
Federica Caporuscio	Trap				
Jessica Rossi	Trap				

== Swimming ==
Men

Athlete	Event	Heat		Final	
Athlete	Event	Time	Rank	Time	Rank
Luca Dotto	50 m freestyle	22.82	5 Q	22.20	2nd place, silver medalist(s)
Marco Orsi	50 m freestyle	22.61	1 Q	22.15	1st place, gold medalist(s)
Luca Dotto	100 m freestyle				3rd place, bronze medalist(s)
Luca Leonardi	100 m freestyle				1st place, gold medalist(s)
Alex Di Giorgio	200 m freestyle	3:55.82	8 Q		
Gianluca Maglia	200 m freestyle				
Alex Di Giorgio	400 m freestyle				
Samuel Pizzetti	400 m freestyle				
Luca Baggio	1500 m freestyle	—N/a		15:15.16	2nd place, silver medalist(s)
Matteo Furlan	1500 m freestyle	—N/a		15:21.19	3rd place, bronze medalist(s)
Niccolò Bonacchi	50 m backstroke	25.87	3 Q	25.42	2nd place, silver medalist(s)
Mauro Pizzamiglio	50 m backstroke	26.06	4 Q	25.35	1st place, gold medalist(s)
Niccolò Bonacchi	100 m backstroke				
Matteo Milli	100 m backstroke				1st place, gold medalist(s)
Damiano Lestingi	200 m backstroke				2nd place, silver medalist(s)
Federico Turrini	200 m backstroke				2nd place, silver medalist(s)
Mattia Pesce	50 m breaststroke				
Andrea Toniato	50 m breaststroke				2nd place, silver medalist(s)
Fabio Scozzoli	100 m breaststroke	1:02.94	4 Q	1:00.86	1st place, gold medalist(s)
Andrea Toniato	100 m breaststroke	1:01.95	1 Q	1:01.23	2nd place, silver medalist(s)
Flavio Bizzarri	200 m breaststroke				2nd place, silver medalist(s)
Luca Pizzini	200 m breaststroke				
Piero Codia	50 m butterfly				2nd place, silver medalist(s)
Andrea Farru	50 m butterfly				
Piero Codia	100 m butterfly	53.38	3 Q	53.18	3rd place, bronze medalist(s)
Matteo Rivolta	100 m butterfly	53.88	5 Q	53.04	2nd place, silver medalist(s)
Gherardo Bruni	200 m butterfly				
Francesco Pavone	200 m butterfly				3rd place, bronze medalist(s)
Fabio Scozzoli	200 m individual medley	2:08.65	11	did not advance	
Federico Turrini	200 m individual medley	2:03.37	1 Q	1:59.35	1st place, gold medalist(s)
Luca Marin	400 m individual medley				
Federico Turrini	400 m individual medley				2nd place, silver medalist(s)
Luca Dotto; Luca Leonardi; Marco Orsi; Michele Santucci	4×100 m freestyle relay				1st place, gold medalist(s)
Andrea D'Arrigo; Alex Di Giorgio; Damiano Lestingi; Gianluca Maglia	4×200 m freestyle relay				1st place, gold medalist(s)
Matteo Milli; Mattia Pesce; Piero Codia; Alex Di Giorgio	4×100 m medley relay				1st place, gold medalist(s)
Simone Ciulli	100 m freestyle S10				2nd place, silver medalist(s)
Federico Morlacchi	100 m freestyle S10				

Women

Athlete	Event	Heat		Final	
Athlete	Event	Time	Rank	Time	Rank
Silvia Di Pietro	50 m freestyle				2nd place, silver medalist(s)
Erika Ferraioli	50 m freestyle				
Silvia Di Pietro	100 m freestyle				3rd place, bronze medalist(s)
Erika Ferraioli	100 m freestyle				2nd place, silver medalist(s)
Diletta Carli	200 m freestyle				3rd place, bronze medalist(s)
Martina De Memme	200 m freestyle				1st place, gold medalist(s)
Martina De Memme	400 m freestyle	4:14.36	1 Q	4:09.18	1st place, gold medalist(s)
Chiara Masini Luccetti	400 m freestyle	4:20.06	5 Q	4:16.03	4
Martina De Memme	800 m freestyle	—N/a		8:33.17	1st place, gold medalist(s)
Aurora Ponselè	800 m freestyle	—N/a		8:40.70	2nd place, silver medalist(s)
Arianna Barbieri	50 m backstroke	29.04	2 Q	28.74	3rd place, bronze medalist(s)
Elena Gemo	50 m backstroke	29.75	7 Q	29.16	6
Elena Gemo	100 m backstroke	1:02.91	2 Q	1:01.57 GR	1st place, gold medalist(s)
Margherita Panziera	100 m backstroke	1:02.83	1 Q	1:01.86	3rd place, bronze medalist(s)
Ambra Esposito	200 m backstroke	2:15.87	2 Q	2:12.21	1st place, gold medalist(s)
Margherita Panziera	200 m backstroke	2:14.75	1 Q	2:12.86	2nd place, silver medalist(s)
Giulia De Ascentis	50 m breaststroke				3rd place, bronze medalist(s)
Michela Guzzetti	50 m breaststroke				1st place, gold medalist(s)
Giulia De Ascentis	100 m breaststroke	1:10.17	3 Q	1:08.57	1st place, gold medalist(s)
Michela Guzzetti	100 m breaststroke	1:11.18	7 Q	1:09.09	4
Elisa Celli	200 m breaststroke				2nd place, silver medalist(s)
Giulia De Ascentis	200 m breaststroke				
Elena Di Liddo	50 m butterfly				
Silvia Di Pietro	50 m butterfly				3rd place, bronze medalist(s)
Ilaria Bianchi	100 m butterfly				1st place, gold medalist(s)
Elena Di Liddo	100 m butterfly				2nd place, silver medalist(s)
Emanuela Albenzi	200 m butterfly				3rd place, bronze medalist(s)
Stefania Pirozzi	200 m butterfly				1st place, gold medalist(s)
Stefania Pirozzi	200 m individual medley	2:18.93	3 Q	2:16.12	2nd place, silver medalist(s)
Carlotta Toni	200 m individual medley	2:19.06	=4 Q	2:16.24	3rd place, bronze medalist(s)
Stefania Pirozzi	400 m individual medley	4:48.03	1 Q	DQ	
Carlotta Toni	400 m individual medley	4:55.35	6 Q	DQ	
Silvia Di Pietro; Erika Ferraioli; Laura Letrari; Chiara Masini	4×100 m freestyle relay				
Diletta Carli; Martina De Memme; Chiara Masini; Stefania Pirozzi	4×200 m freestyle relay				1st place, gold medalist(s)
Elena Gemo; Michela Guzzetti; Elena Di Liddo; Silvia Di Pietro	4×100 m medley relay				1st place, gold medalist(s)
Francesca Secci	100 m freestyle S10	—N/a		1:09.22	4

== Table tennis ==
Men

Athlete	Event	Round Robin 1				Round Robin 2				Quarterfinal	Semifinal	Final / BM	
Athlete	Event	Opposition Score	Opposition Score	Opposition Score	Rank	Opposition Score	Opposition Score	Opposition Score	Rank	Opposition Score	Opposition Score	Opposition Score	Rank
Mihai Bobocica	Singles												
Marco Rech	Singles												
Niagol Stoyanov	Singles												
Mihai Bobocica; Marco Rech; Niagol Stoyanov	Team					—N/a							

Women

Athlete	Event	Round Robin 1				Round Robin 2				Quarterfinal	Semifinal	Final / BM	
Athlete	Event	Opposition Score	Opposition Score	Opposition Score	Rank	Opposition Score	Opposition Score	Opposition Score	Rank	Opposition Score	Opposition Score	Opposition Score	Rank
Giorgia Piccolin	Singles												
Nikoleta Stefanova	Singles												
Debora Vivarelli	Singles												
Giorgia Piccolin; Nikoleta Stefanova; Debora Vivarelli	Team					—N/a							

== Taekwondo ==
Men

Athlete	Event	Round of 16	Quarterfinals	Semifinals	Repechage 1	Repechage 2	Final / BM	
Athlete	Event	Opposition Result	Opposition Result	Opposition Result	Opposition Result	Opposition Result	Opposition Result	Rank
Marcello Porcaro	−58 kg							
Claudio Treviso	−68 kg							
Simone Cannellino	−80 kg							
Leonardo Basile	+80 kg							

Women

Athlete	Event	Round of 16	Quarterfinals	Semifinals	Repechage 1	Repechage 2	Final / BM	
Athlete	Event	Opposition Result	Opposition Result	Opposition Result	Opposition Result	Opposition Result	Opposition Result	Rank
Roberta Ramazzotto	−49 kg							
Cristina Gaspa	−57 kg							
Cristiana Rizzelli	−67 kg							
Maristella Smiraglia	+67 kg							

== Tennis ==
Men

Athlete	Event	Round of 32	Round of 16	Quarterfinals	Semifinals	Final / BM	
Athlete	Event	Opposition Score	Opposition Score	Opposition Score	Opposition Score	Opposition Score	Rank
Marco Cecchinato	Singles						
Stefano Travaglia	Singles						
Marco Cecchinato; Stefano Travaglia	Doubles						

Women

Athlete	Event	Round of 32	Round of 16	Quarterfinals	Semifinals	Final / BM	
Athlete	Event	Opposition Score	Opposition Score	Opposition Score	Opposition Score	Opposition Score	Rank
Federica Di Sarra	Singles						
Anastasia Grymalska	Singles						
Federica Di Sarra; Anastasia Grymalska	Doubles						

== Volleyball ==
=== Beach ===
Athlete	Event	Preliminary round	Standing	Quarterfinals	Semifinals	Final / BM	
Athlete	Event	Opposition Score	Standing	Opposition Score	Opposition Score	Opposition Score	Rank
Matteo Cecchini; Paolo Ingrosso	Men's						
Daniele Lupo; Paolo Nicolai	Men's						
Greta Cicolari; Marta Menegatti	Women's						
Laura Giombini; Daniela Gloria	Women's						

=== Indoor ===
==== Men's tournament ====
Team

- Simone Anzani
- Giorgio De Togni
- Lodovico Dolfo
- Marco Falaschi
- Michele Fedrizzi
- Andrea Galliani
- Daniele Mazzone
- Pierpaolo Partenio
- Nicola Pesaresi
- Alessandro Preti
- Giulio Sabbi
- Filippo Vedovotto

Standings

Pos	Team	Pld	W	L	Pts	SW	SL	SR	SPW	SPL	SPR
1	Italy	3	2	1	7	8	2	4.000	255	205	1.244
2	Tunisia	3	2	1	6	6	4	1.500	212	219	0.968
3	Algeria	3	2	1	5	6	5	1.200	240	243	0.988
4	Macedonia	3	0	3	0	1	9	0.111	205	245	0.837

Results

Date	Time		Score		Set 1	Set 2	Set 3	Set 4	Set 5	Total	Report
21-Jun	18:00	Italy	–	Macedonia							
23-Jun	15:30	Algeria	–	Italy							
25-Jun	13:00	Tunisia	–	Italy							

==== Women's tournament ====
Team

- Valentina Arrighetti
- Cristina Barcellini
- Floriana Bertone
- Lucia Bosetti
- Valeria Caracuta
- Monica De Gennaro
- Chiara De Iulio
- Valentina Diouf
- Raphaela Folie
- Alessia Gennari
- Laura Partenio
- Noemi Signorile

Standings

Pos	Team	Pld	W	L	Pts	SW	SL	SR	SPW	SPL	SPR
1	Italy	2	2	0	6	6	0	MAX	155	108	1.435
2	Croatia	2	1	1	2	3	5	0.600	154	177	0.870
3	France	2	0	2	1	2	6	0.333	155	179	0.866

Results

Date	Time		Score		Set 1	Set 2	Set 3	Set 4	Set 5	Total	Report
24-Jun	15:30	Italy	–	France							
26-Jun	15:30	Croatia	–	Italy							

== Water polo ==
=== Men's tournament ===
Team

- Matteo Aicardi
- Marco Del Lungo
- Maurizio Felugo
- Niccolà Figari
- Pietro Figlioli
- Deni Fiorentini
- Valentino Gallo
- Alex Giorgetti
- Nicolò Gitto
- Amaurys Perez
- Christian Presciutti
- Olexander Sadovyy
- Stefano Tempesti

Standings

Team	Pld	W	D	L	GF	GA	GD	Pts
Greece	3	3	0	0	32	14	+18	6
Italy	3	2	0	1	26	19	+7	4
France	3	1	0	2	19	24	−5	2
Serbia	3	0	0	3	11	31	−20	0

Results

June 19, 2013; 18:00	Report	Italy	9–6	France	Çiftlikköy Campus Swimming Pool, Mersin; Referees: Vlasic (CRO) and Colominas (ESP)
June 19, 2013; 18:00	Report	Score by quarters: 1 – 0, 2–2, 3 – 1, 3–3			Çiftlikköy Campus Swimming Pool, Mersin; Referees: Vlasic (CRO) and Colominas (ESP)
June 19, 2013; 18:00	Report	3 players, 2	Goals	Marzouki, Camarasa 2	Çiftlikköy Campus Swimming Pool, Mersin; Referees: Vlasic (CRO) and Colominas (ESP)

June 21, 2013; 18:00	Serbia	–	Italy	Çiftlikköy Campus Swimming Pool, Mersin

June 22, 2013; 16:30	Greece	–	Italy	Çiftlikköy Campus Swimming Pool, Mersin

== Water skiing ==
Men

Athlete	Event	Heat		Final	
Athlete	Event	Points	Rank	Points	Rank
Carlo Allais	Slalom				
Matteo Luzzeri	Slalom				

Women

Athlete	Event	Heat		Final	
Athlete	Event	Points	Rank	Points	Rank
Alice Bagnoli	Slalom				
Beatrice Ianni	Slalom				

== Weightlifting ==
Men

Athlete	Event	Snatch		Clean & Jerk	
Athlete	Event	Result	Rank	Result	Rank
Mirco Scarantino	−56 kg				
Michael Di Giusto	−62 kg				
Antonino Pizzolato	−85 kg				
Pietro Noto	−105 kg				

Women

Athlete	Event	Snatch		Clean & Jerk	
Athlete	Event	Result	Rank	Result	Rank
Genny Pagliaro	−48 kg				
Jennifer Lombardo	−53 kg				
Giorgia Russo	−58 kg				
Giorgia Bordignon	−63 kg				
Maria Grazia Alemanno	−69 kg				
Carlotta Brunelli	−75 kg				

== Wrestling ==
Men's Freestyle

Athlete	Event	Qualification	Round of 16	Quarterfinal	Semifinal	Repechage 1	Repechage 2	Final / BM	
Athlete	Event	Opposition Result	Opposition Result	Opposition Result	Opposition Result	Opposition Result	Opposition Result	Opposition Result	Rank
Salvatore Mannino	−55 kg								
Antonino Tagliavia	−60 kg								
Angelo Costa	−66 kg								
Andrea Sorbello	−74 kg								
Carmelo Lumia	−84 kg								
Stefano Trapani	−96 kg								

Men's Greco-Roman

Athlete	Event	Qualification	Round of 16	Quarterfinal	Semifinal	Repechage 1	Repechage 2	Final / BM	
Athlete	Event	Opposition Result	Opposition Result	Opposition Result	Opposition Result	Opposition Result	Opposition Result	Opposition Result	Rank
Federico Manea	−55 kg								
Lorenzo Gentile	−60 kg								
Davide Cascavilla	−66 kg								
Tiziano Corriga	−74 kg								
Fabio Parisi	−84 kg								
Daigoro Timoncini	−96 kg								
Daniele Ficara	−120 kg								

Women's Freestyle

Athlete	Event	Qualification	Round of 16	Quarterfinal	Semifinal	Repechage 1	Repechage 2	Final / BM	
Athlete	Event	Opposition Result	Opposition Result	Opposition Result	Opposition Result	Opposition Result	Opposition Result	Opposition Result	Rank
Silvia Felice	−48 kg								
Francesca Mori	−51 kg								
Valentina Minguzzi	−55 kg								
Maria Diana	−63 kg								
