= Dejan Terzić =

Serbian sprint canoer

Personal information
- Born: 21 April 1987 (age 39) Bečej, SR Serbia, Yugoslavia
Medal record
Men's canoe sprint
Representing Serbia
European Championships
Bronze medal – third place	2012 Zagreb	K-4 1000 m
Mediterranean Games
Silver medal – second place	2013 Mersin	K-2 1000 m

Dejan Terzić (Serbian Cyrillic: Дејан Терзић, 21 April 1987 in Bečej, SR Serbia, Yugoslavia) is a Serbian sprint canoer.

He won a bronze medal in the K-4 1000 m event at the 2012 Canoe Sprint European Championships in Zagreb.
