= Katarina Stepanović =

Serbian handball player (born 1985)

Personal information
- Nationality: Serbian
- Born: 15 January 1985 (age 41) Aranđelovac, Serbia
- Height: 1.86 m (6 ft 1 in)

Sport
- Sport: Handball
- Position: Left back
- Current club: RK Radnički Kragujevac
- Number: 6
National team
Years	Team	Apps	(Gls)
–	Serbia	11	(23)
Medal record
Mediterranean Games
Gold medal – first place	2013 Mersin	Team

Katarina Stepanović (née Vojčić; born 15 January 1985) is a Serbian handball player for RK Radnički Kragujevac and the Serbian national team.
