= Igor Tešić =

Serbian beach volleyball player

Personal information
- Born: 3 January 1988 (age 38)

Beach volleyball information

Current teammate
Teammate
Stefan Basta
Honours
Men's beach volleyball
Representing Serbia
Balkan Championship
Gold medal – first place	2011 Montenegro	Beach

Igor Tešić (Serbian: Игор Тешић; born 3 January 1988) is a male beach volleyball player from Serbia. Tešić and his teammate Stefan Basta represented Serbia at the 2013 Mediterranean Games and won 6th place.

Igor Tešić and Stefan Basta won 7th place at the 2012 CEV Beach Volleyball European Championship – Novi Sad Masters .
