= David Cournooh =

Ghanaian-Italian basketball player (born 1990)

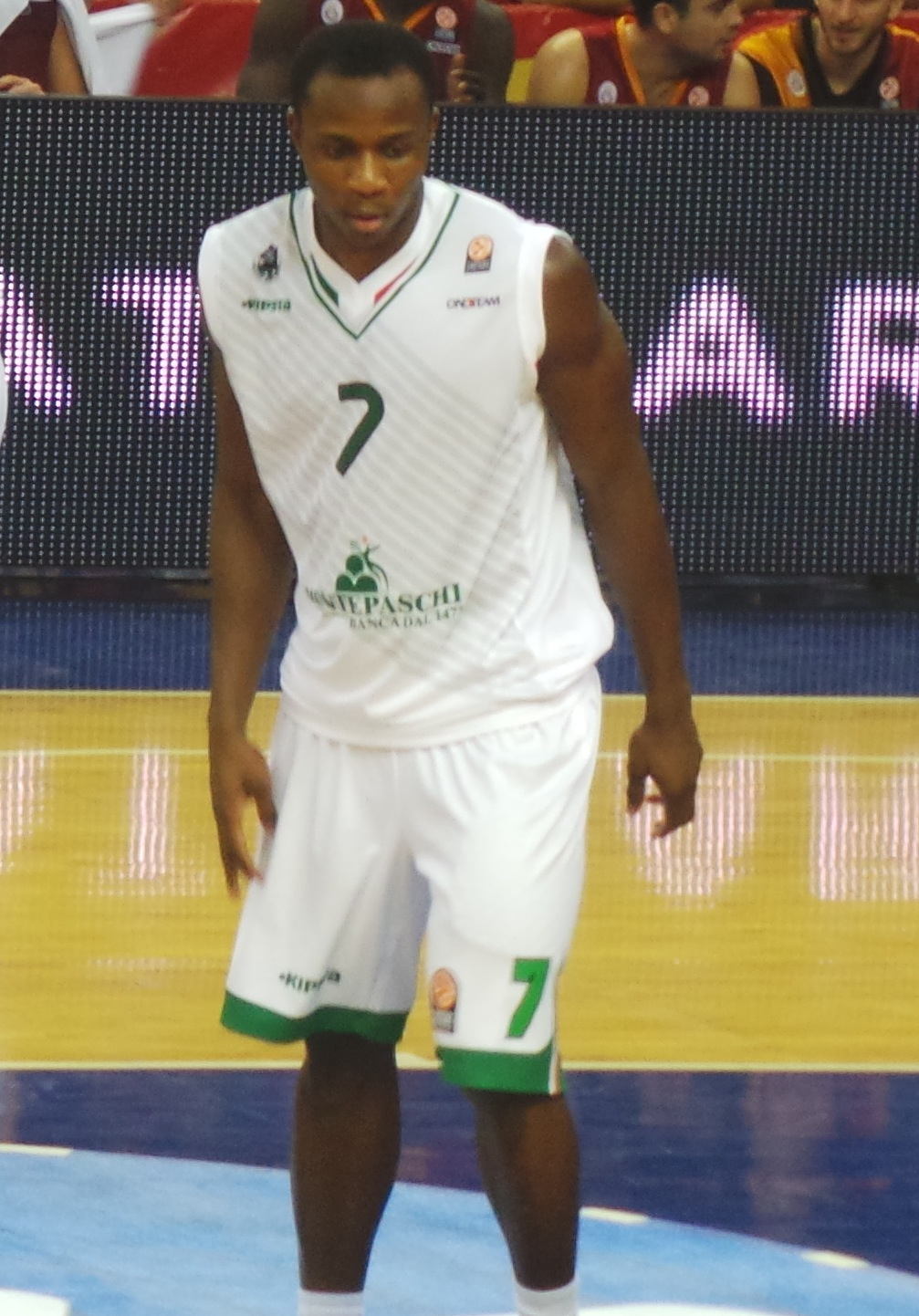
- Cournooh with Montepaschi Siena in 2013

No. 25 – Libertas Livorno
- Position: Point guard / shooting guard
- League: Serie A2

Personal information
- Born: 28 July 1990 (age 36) Villafranca di Verona, Italy
- Listed height: 1.87 m (6 ft 2 in)
- Listed weight: 88 kg (194 lb)

Career information
- NBA draft: 2012: undrafted
- Playing career: 2007–present

Career history
- 2007–2014: Montepaschi Siena
- 2008–2009: →Virtus Siena
- 2009–2010: →Junior Casale
- 2010–2011: →Ferrara
- 2011–2012: →Andrea Costa Imola
- 2012–2013: →Biancoblù Bologna
- 2014–2016: Brindisi
- 2016–2017: Pistoia
- 2017–2018: Cantù
- 2018–2020: Virtus Bologna
- 2020–2022: Vanoli Cremona
- 2022: Scafati Basket
- 2022–2026: Pallacanestro Brescia
- 2026–present: Libertas Livorno

Career highlights
- FIBA Champions League champion (2019); Italian Supercup winner (2013)

David Reginald Cournooh (born 28 July 1990) is an Italian-Ghanaian professional basketball player for Libertas Livorno of the Serie A2.

== Professional career ==
In June 2016, he signed a two-year contract with The Flexx Pistoia.

On 13 January 2017, Cournooh parted ways with The Flexx Pistoia and signed with the Pallacanestro Cantù.

On 30 June 2018, Corunooh signed with Virtus Bologna.

On 4 August 2020, Cournooh signed with Vanoli Cremona.

On 27 June 2022 he signed with Pallacanestro Brescia of Lega Basket Serie A.

== National team career ==
Because of the unavailability of a Ghanaian national basketball team, Cournooh has been a member of the Italian national basketball team.

== Honours and titles ==
=== Club ===
Montepaschi Siena

- Italian Supercup: 2013

Virtus Bologna

- Basketball Champions League: 2018–19
