= Marko Marjanović =

Serbian rower

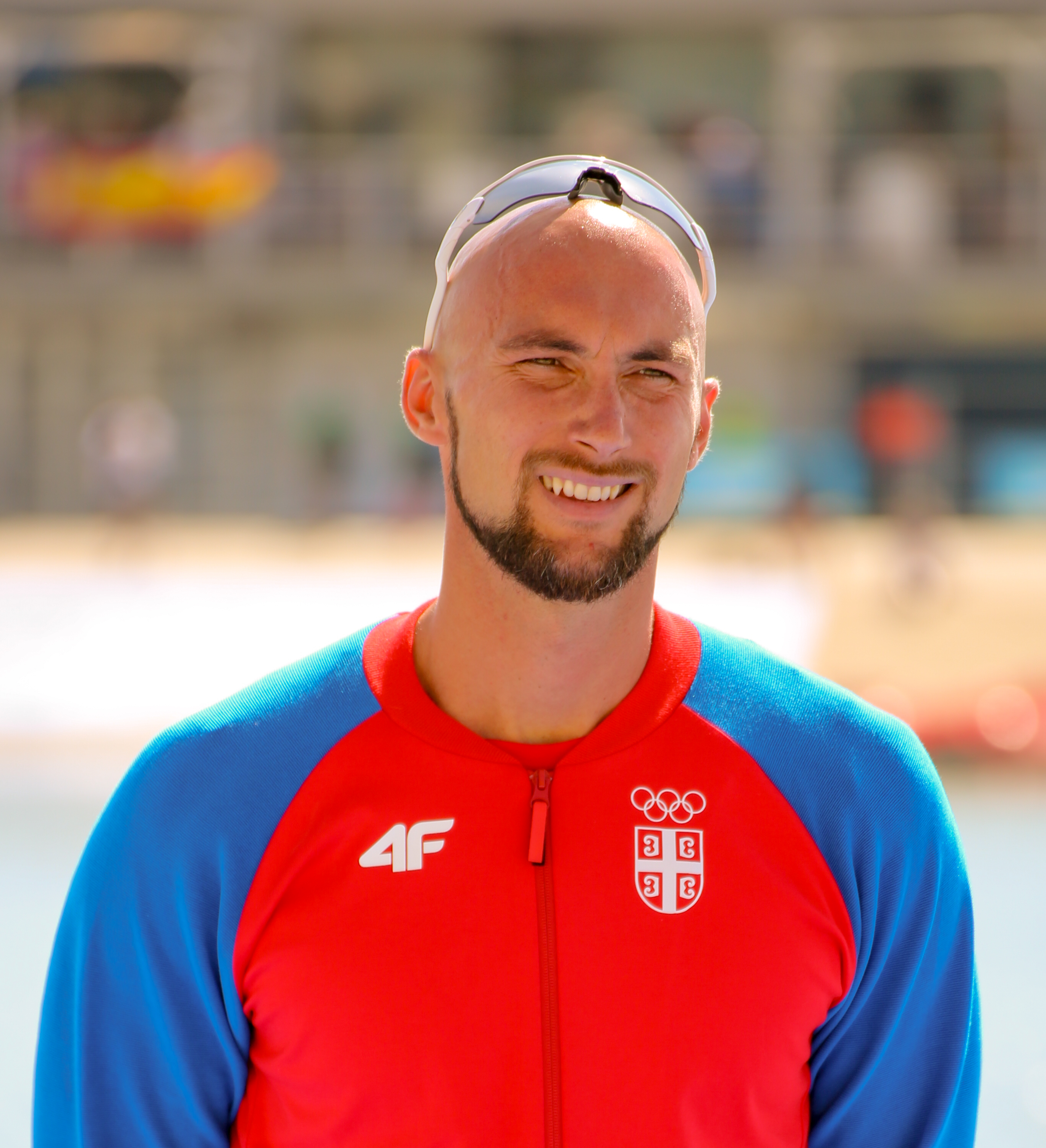
- Marjanović in 2018

Medal record

Men's Rowing

Representing Serbia

World Championships
Silver medal – second place	2007 Munich	Coxed four

European Championships
Silver medal – second place	2011 Plovdiv	Double sculls
Bronze medal – third place	2009 Brest	Double sculls
Bronze medal – third place	2010 Montemor-o-Velho	Coxless pair

Mediterranean Games
Silver medal – second place	2013 Mersin	Double sculls
Silver medal – second place	2018 Tarragona	Single sculls

World U23 Championships
Silver medal – second place	2006 Hazewinkel	Coxless pair

Marko Marjanović (Serbian Cyrillic: Марко Марјановић, born 24 November 1985 in Zemun, SR Serbia, Yugoslavia) is a Serbian rower.

Born on 24 November 1985 in Belgrade, Marjanović represented Serbia at the 2012 Summer Olympics in London and the 2016 Summer Olympics in Rio de Janeiro. During his rowing career he won medals at world and European championships, World Cup regattas and the Mediterranean Games, and competed as captain for the University of California, Berkeley.

In January 2026, Marjanović was elected president of the Rowing Federation of Serbia at an extraordinary electoral session of the federation’s assembly in Belgrade, taking office for a four-year term. A former member of the Serbian national team and a long-standing member of Rowing Club Partizan, he presented a four-year programme focused on stabilising the federation’s operations, strengthening trust among member clubs, improving the competition system, developing junior categories and coaching staff, and expanding institutional cooperation with state bodies and international sporting organisations. Under the federation’s statute, the president also chairs its management board.
