= Aleksandar Kukolj =

Serbian judoka (born 1991)

Personal information
- Nationality: Serbian
- Born: 9 September 1991 (age 35) Prague, Czechoslovakia
- Occupation: Judoka
- Height: 1.94 m (6 ft 4 in)

Sport
- Country: Serbia
- Sport: Judo
- Weight class: ‍–‍90 kg, ‍–‍100 kg
- Coached by: Predrag Dražović

Achievements and titles
- Olympic Games: R16 (2020, 2016)
- World Champ.: (silver) (2021)
- European Champ.: (gold) (2017)
Medal record
Men's judo
Representing Serbia
World Championships
Silver medal – second place	2021 Budapest	‍–‍100 kg
European Championships
Gold medal – first place	2017 Warsaw	‍–‍90 kg
IJF Grand Slam
Gold medal – first place	2016 Abu Dhabi	‍–‍90 kg
Gold medal – first place	2016 Tokyo	‍–‍90 kg
Gold medal – first place	2018 Ekaterinburg	‍–‍90 kg
Silver medal – second place	2016 Baku	‍–‍90 kg
Silver medal – second place	2022 Baku	‍–‍100 kg
Silver medal – second place	2023 Abu Dhabi	‍–‍100 kg
Bronze medal – third place	2018 Abu Dhabi	‍–‍90 kg
Bronze medal – third place	2022 Antalya	‍–‍100 kg
Bronze medal – third place	2022 Abu Dhabi	‍–‍100 kg
Bronze medal – third place	2024 Paris	‍–‍100 kg
IJF Grand Prix
Gold medal – first place	2017 The Hague	‍–‍90 kg
Gold medal – first place	2018 The Hague	‍–‍90 kg
Gold medal – first place	2023 Zagreb	‍–‍100 kg
Silver medal – second place	2014 Zagreb	‍–‍90 kg
Silver medal – second place	2015 Samsun	‍–‍90 kg
Silver medal – second place	2017 Hohhot	‍–‍90 kg
Bronze medal – third place	2016 Havana	‍–‍90 kg
Bronze medal – third place	2017 Antalya	‍–‍90 kg
Bronze medal – third place	2018 Budapest	‍–‍90 kg
Mediterranean Games
Gold medal – first place	2013 Mersin	‍–‍90 kg
Bronze medal – third place	2022 Oran	‍–‍100 kg
European U23 Championships
Silver medal – second place	2013 Samokov	‍–‍90 kg
Bronze medal – third place	2010 Sarajevo	‍–‍81 kg
European Junior Championships
Silver medal – second place	2010 Samokov	‍–‍81 kg

Profile at external databases
- IJF: 1220
- JudoInside.com: 49032
- Updated on 4 February 2024

Aleksandar Kukolj (Serbian Cyrillic: Александар Кукољ; born 9 September 1991) is a Serbian judoka. He is a silver medalist at the 2021 World Championships and the 2017 European Champion. He won gold medals at the 2016 Abu Dhabi Grand Slam and the 2016 Tokyo Grand Slam. Kukolj started with bronze in the 2016 Havana Grand Prix and silvers at the 2014 Zagreb Grand Prix, 2015 Samsun Grand Prix and 2016 Baku Grand Slam. Kukolj won World Cups in Lisbon in 2012 and won the Panam Open in San Salvador in 2014 and the 2013 Mediterranean Games. He won European medals as Junior and U23. Kukolj competed at the 2016 Summer Olympics in Rio de Janeiro, in the men's 90 kg.

== Achievements ==
2017

- (gold) European Championships — 20–23 April, Warsaw, Poland — ‍–‍90 kg
- (bronze) Grand Prix Antalya — 7–9 April, Antalya, Turkey — ‍–‍90 kg

2016

- (gold) Grand Slam Tokyo — 2–4 December, Tokyo, Japan — ‍–‍90 kg
- (gold) Grand Slam Abu Dhabi — 28–30 October, Abu Dhabi, United Arab Emirates — ‍–‍90 kg
- (silver) Grand Slam Baku — 6–8 May, Baku, Azerbaijan — ‍–‍90 kg
- (bronze) Grand Prix Havana — 22–24 June, Havana, Cuba — ‍–‍90 kg

2015

- (silver) Grand Prix Samsun — 27–29 March, Samsun, Turkey — ‍–‍90 kg

2014

- (silver) Grand Prix Zagreb — 12–14 September, Zagreb, Croatia — ‍–‍90 kg
- (gold) Panamerican Open San Salvador — 14–15 June, San Salvador, El Salvador — ‍–‍90 kg
- (silver) European Open Prague — 1–2 March, Prague, Czech Republic — ‍–‍90 kg
- (silver) European Open Sofia — 1–2 February, Sofia, Bulgaria — ‍–‍90 kg

2013

- (silver) European Open Budapest — 16–17 February, Budapest, Hungary — ‍–‍90 kg

2012

- (bronze) World Cup Rome — 29–30 September, Rome, Italy — ‍–‍90 kg
- (gold) World Cup Lisbon — 9–10 June, Lisbon, Portugal — ‍–‍90 kg+
