= Francesco Fossi =

Italian rower (born 1988)

Personal information
- Born: 15 April 1988 (age 38) Florence, Italy
Medal record
Men's rowing
Representing Italy
World Championships
Silver medal – second place	2014 Amsterdam	M2x
Bronze medal – third place	2013 Chungju	M2x
European Championships
Gold medal – first place	2013 Seville	M2x
Bronze medal – third place	2011 Plovdiv	M4x

Francesco Fossi (born 15 April 1988) is an Italian rower. He competed in the Men's quadruple sculls event at the 2012 Summer Olympics and the men's double sculls at the 2016 Summer Olympics. In the latter event, he finished fourth with teammate Romano Battisti.

He has also won a silver medal in the men's double sculls, again with Battisti, at the 2014 World Rowing Championships. The previous year, the pair had won a bronze in the same event. The pair also won the European title in 2013. Fossi was also part of the Italian team that won bronze in the men's quadruple sculls at the 2011 European Championships.
