= Aleksandar Filipović (rower) =

Serbian rower

Medal record

Representing Serbia

Mediterranean Games
Silver medal – second place	2013 Mersin	Double sculls

World Rowing U23 Championships
Gold medal – first place	2012 Trakai	Coxed fours

Aleksandar Filipović (Serbian: Александар Филиповић, born 29 May 1992 in Smederevo) is a Serbian rower.

He won a gold medal at the 2012 World Rowing U23 Championships in men's coxed four.
