= Edip Buran Arena =

Indoor sports arena

- Edip Buran Spor Salonu (Turkish)
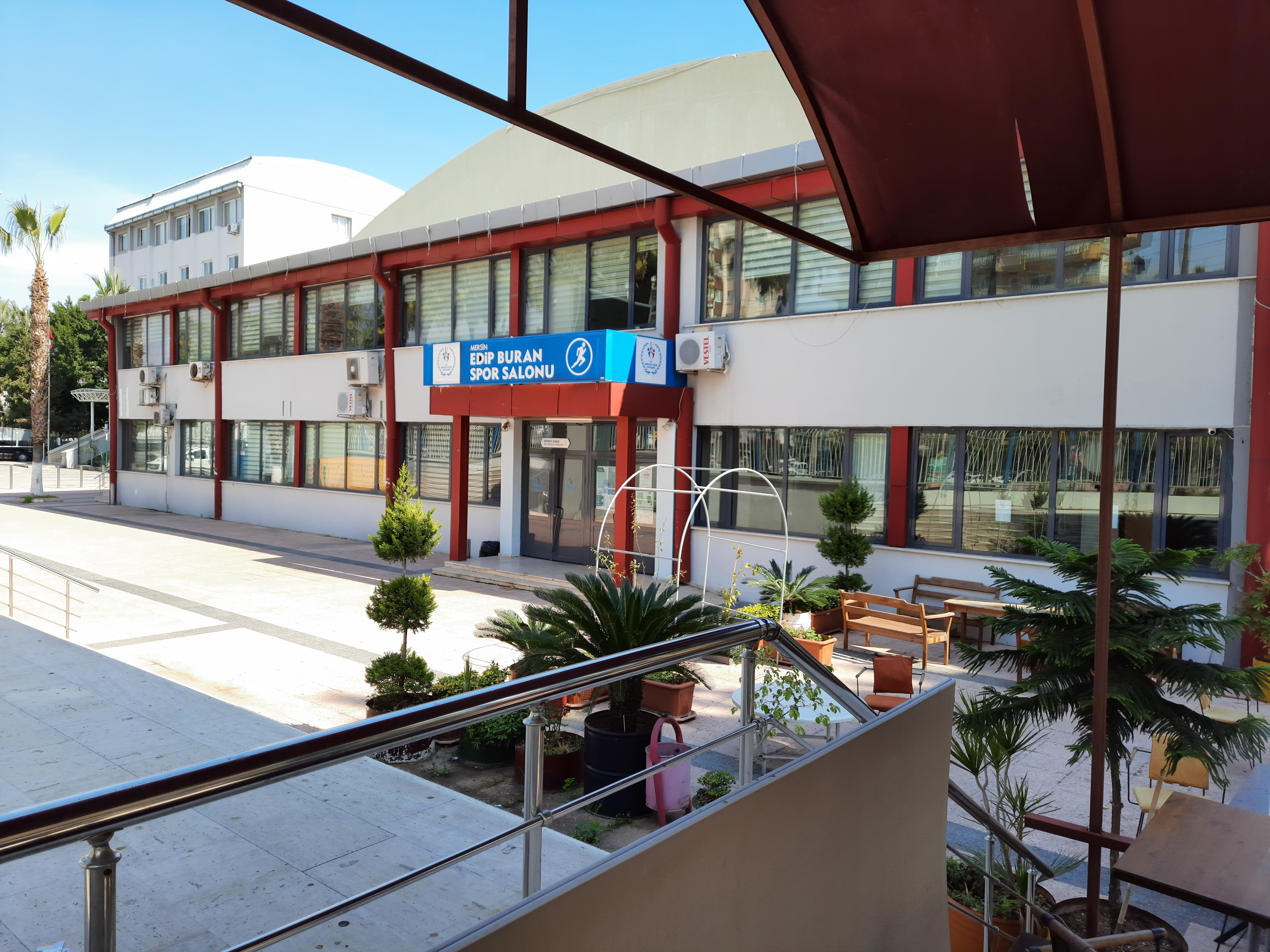
- Interactive map of Edip Buran Arena
- Former names: Yenişehir Belediyesi Sports Hall (Yenişehir Belediyesi Spor Salonu)
- Location: Yenişehir, Mersin, Turkey
- Coordinates: 36°47′21″N 34°36′43″E
- Owner: Youth Services and Sports Directoriate of Mersin
- Capacity: 1,750

Construction
- Opened: 1971; 55 years ago
- Renovated: 2013; 13 years ago

Tenants
- Mersin BB men's basketball team; Mersin BB women's basketball team

The Edip Buran Arena (Turkish: Edip Buran Spor Salonu), formerly Yenişehir Belediyesi Sports Hall (Turkish: Yenişehir Belidyesi Spor Salonu), is a multi-sport indoor arena at Yenişehir district of Mersin, Turkey. Built in 1971, it is owned by the Youth Services and Sports Directoriate of Mersin. The sports hall has a seating capacity of 1,750. It was renovated for the 2013 Mediterranean Games, and the new sports hall went on January 20, 2013, in service.

The venue is suitable for events of basketball, fencing, gymnastics, handball, judo, karate, table tennis, taekwondo, volleyball, wrestling etc. With the promotion of Mersin Büyükşehir Belediyesi men's basketball team's to Turkish Basketball League in the 2005–06 season, the sports hall became a basketball league venue. The venue is also home to the women's side of the Mersin Büyükşehir Belediyesi S.K., which plays in the Turkish Women's Basketball League (TKBL).

== Major events ==
Turkey men's national handball team played their home match against Portugal in the 2013 World Men's Handball Championship – European qualification at the venue on January 8, 2012. All the Group 4 matches of the 2014 European Men's Handball Championship qualification were played in the arena from June 8 to 10, 2012. Turkey national team's home match against France in the Qualification Phase 2 of the same tournament took place in the sports hall on November 4, 2012. During the 2013 Mediterranean Games, the arena hosted taekwondo competitions on June 21–23 and karate competitions between 28 June and 29 June while the training activities of the related sports branches took place also at the sports hall.
