= San Marino at the 2013 Mediterranean Games =

- IOC code: SMR
- NOC: Comitato Olimpico Nazionale Sammarinese

in Mersin
- Medals Ranked 17th: Gold 0 Silver 2 Bronze 3 Total 5

Mediterranean Games appearances (overview)
- 1987; 1991; 1993; 1997; 2001; 2005; 2009; 2013; 2018; 2022

San Marino competed at the 2013 Mediterranean Games in Mersin, Turkey from the 20th to 30 June 2013.

== Bocce ==
- Men's Singles: Matteo Albani: Silver
- Men's Doubles: Bronze
- Women's Singles: Anna Maria Ciucci: Silver
- Women's Doubles: Bronze
