= Croatia at the 2013 Mediterranean Games =

- IOC code: CRO
- NOC: Croatian Olympic Committee

in Mersin
- Competitors: 102 in 18 sports
- Flag bearer: Giovanni Cernogoraz
- Medals Ranked th: Gold 11 Silver 7 Bronze 9 Total 27

Mediterranean Games appearances (overview)
- 1993; 1997; 2001; 2005; 2009; 2013; 2018; 2022

Other related appearances
- Yugoslavia (1951–1991)

Croatia competed at the 2013 Mediterranean Games in Mersin, Turkey from 20 to 30 June 2013.

== Medalists ==
Medal	Name	Sport	Event	Date
Gold	Sanja Jovanović	Swimming	Women's 50 m backstroke	21 June
Gold	Marijana Mišković	Judo	Women's 63 kg	22 June
Gold	Croatia men's national water polo team: Josip Pavić; Marko Bijač; Nikša Dobud; Ivan Krapić; Andro Bušlje; Ivan Mulaković; Luka Lončar; Sandro Sukno; Petar Muslim; Luka Bukić; Maro Joković; Paulo Obradović; Anđelo Šetka	Water polo	Men's water polo	25 June
Gold	Tonči Stipanović	Sailing	Men's Laser	27 June
Gold	Tina Mihelić	Sailing	Women's Laser Radial	27 June
Gold	Šime Fantela; Igor Marenić	Sailing	Men's 470	27 June
Gold	Martin Marić	Athletics	Men's discus throw	27 June
Gold	Leo Brnić	Bocce	Men's progressive throw	28 June
Gold	Zvonimir Đurkinjak; Zvonimir Hölbling	Badminton	Men's doubles	29 June
Gold	Ana Šimić	Athletics	Women's high jump	29 June
Gold	Sandra Perković	Athletics	Women's discus throw	29 June
Silver	Neven Žugaj	Wrestling	Men's Greco-Roman 74 kg	23 June
Silver	Robert Seligman	Gymnastics	Men's all-around	24 June
Silver	Marijo Možnik	Gymnastics	Men's all-around	24 June
Silver	Josip Bepo Filipi	Boxing	Men's heavyweight	26 June
Silver	Enia Ninčević; Romana Župan	Sailing	Women's 470	27 June
Silver	Marin Premeru	Athletics	Men's shot put	29 June
Silver	Croatia men's national handball team: Damir Batinović; Hrvoje Batinović; Filip Gavranović; Igor Karačić; Marino Marić; Marko Matić; Jerko Matulić; Marko Mrđenović; Ivan Pešić; Ivan Slišković; Lovro Šprem; Ivan Stevanović; Tim Thoss; Nik Tominec; Josip Vidović; Stefan Vujić	Handball	Men's handball	30 June
Bronze	Marcela Milošević	Rowing	Women's single sculls	23 June
Bronze	Tomislav Marijanović	Judo	Men's 81 kg	22 June
Bronze	Nenad Žugaj	Wrestling	Men's Greco-Roman 84 kg	22 June
Bronze	Dominik Etlinger	Wrestling	Men's Greco-Roman 66 kg	22 June
Bronze	Giovanni Cernogoraz	Shooting	Men's trap	24 June
Bronze	Bojan Đurković	Shooting	Men's 50 m rifle prone	26 June
Bronze	Azra Saleš	Karate	Women's 68kg	29 June
Bronze	Croatia women's national handball team: Sonja Bašić; Andrea Čović; Žana Čović; Dragica Džono; Lana Franković; Nataša Janković; Katarina Ježić; Ivana Kapitanović; Iva Milanović-Litre; Ivana Milić; Ekaterina Nemaškalo; Petra Oštarijaš; Iva Pongrac; Martina Razum; Jelena Vidović	Handball	Women's handball	29 June
Bronze	Croatia women's national volleyball team: Samanta Fabris; Karla Klarić; Laura Miloš; Bernarda Ćutuk; Ivona Ćaćić; Bernarda Brčić; Mirta Bašelović; Iva Jurišić; Lucija Mlinar; Anamarija Miljak; Martina Malević; Katarina Pilepić	Volleyball	Women's volleyball	30 June

== Athletics ==
Key

- Note – Ranks given for track events are within the athlete's heat only
- Q = Qualified for the next round
- q = Qualified for the next round as a fastest loser or, in field events, by position without achieving the qualifying target
- NR = National record
- N/A = Round not applicable for the event
- Bye = Athlete not required to compete in round

Men
Field events

Athlete	Event	Final	
Athlete	Event	Distance	Position
Martin Marić	Discus throw	61.46	1st place, gold medalist(s)
Marin Premeru	Shot put	19.72	2nd place, silver medalist(s)

Women
Track & road events

Athlete	Event	Semifinal		Final	
Athlete	Event	Result	Rank	Result	Rank
Ivana Lončarek	100 m hurdles	Withdrew due to injury			

Field events

Athlete	Event	Final	
Athlete	Event	Distance	Position
Sandra Perković	Discus throw	66.21	1st place, gold medalist(s)
Ana Šimić	High Jump	1.92	1st place, gold medalist(s)

== Badminton ==
Croatia will be represented by two badminton players.

Men

Athlete	Event	Group Stage					Round of 16	Quarterfinal	Semifinal	Final / BM	
Athlete	Event	Opposition Score	Opposition Score	Opposition Score	Opposition Score	Rank	Opposition Score	Opposition Score	Opposition Score	Opposition Score	Rank
Zvonimir Đurkinjak	Singles	Utroša (SLO); W 18–21, 21–16, 21-15	Maddaloni (ITA); L 15–21, 21–17, 12–21	Kiomourtzidis (GRE); W 21–8, 21–7	Lale (TUR); W 21–10, 21–11	1 Q	BYE	Lo Ying Ping (FRA); L 24–26, 15–21	did not advance		
Zvonimir Hölbling	Singles	Choueiry (LIB); W 21–6, 21–10	Abian (ESP); L 7–21, 12–21	Greco (ITA); W 13–21, 21–11, 22-10	Xanthou (GRE); W 21–13, 21-7	2 Q	Lale (TUR); L 12–21, 16–21	did not advance			
Zvonimir Đurkinjak; Zvonimir Hölbling	Doubles	Choueiry / Abou Alwan (LIB); W 21–5, 21–5	Velazquez / Abian (ESP); W 21–15, 21–13	Mondavio / Battaglino (ITA); W 21–13, 21–10	—N/a	1 Q	—N/a	BYE	Utroša / Horvat (SLO); W 21–17, 21–14	Arslan / Oruc (TUR); W 21–15, 21–9	1st place, gold medalist(s)

== Bocce ==
Croatia will be represented by two athletes.

Lyonnaise

Athlete	Event	Elimination		Quarterfinal		Semifinal		Final / BM	
Athlete	Event	Score	Rank	Score	Rank	Score	Rank	Score	Rank
Leo Brnić	Men's progressive throw								1st place, gold medalist(s)
Leo Brnić	Men's precision throw						5	did not advance	
Iva Vlahek	Women's progressive throw								4
Iva Vlahek	Women's precision throw								4

== Boxing ==
Men

Athlete	Event	Round of 16	Quarterfinals	Semifinals	Final	
Athlete	Event	Opposition Result	Opposition Result	Opposition Result	Opposition Result	Rank
Josip Bepo Filipi	Heavyweight	Bouloudinats (ALG); W 3–0	Diane (FRA); W 3–0	Milačić (MNE); W 2–1	Turchi (ITA); L 0–3	2nd place, silver medalist(s)

== Cycling ==
Athlete	Event	Time	Rank
Josip Rumac	Men's road race	DNF	
Josip Rumac	Men's time trial	35:09.02	9

== Fencing ==
Croatia will be represented by one fencer.

Men

Athlete	Event	Group stage						Round of 16	Quarterfinal	Semifinal	Final / BM	
Athlete	Event	Opposition Score	Opposition Score	Opposition Score	Opposition Score	Opposition Score	Rank	Opposition Score	Opposition Score	Opposition Score	Opposition Score	Rank
Bojan Jovanović	Individual foil	Aspromonte (ITA); L 1-5	Samandi (TUN); W 5-3	Ayad (EGY); L 2-5	Nakis (GRE); L 1-5	Biren (TUR); L 1-5	5 Q	Avola (ITA); L 7-15	did not advance			

== Gymnastics ==
=== Artistic ===
Men

Athlete	Event	Qualification								Final							
Athlete	Event	Apparatus						Total	Rank	Apparatus						Total	Rank
Athlete	Event	F	PH	R	V	PB	HB	Total	Rank	F	PH	R	V	PB	HB	Total	Rank
Marijo Možnik	Horizontal bar	—N/a					15.100	15.100	2 Q	—N/a					15.100	15.100	2nd place, silver medalist(s)
Robert Seligman	Pommel horse	—N/a	14.633	—N/a				14.633	2 Q	—N/a	15.166	—N/a				15.166	2nd place, silver medalist(s)

== Handball ==
Croatia will be represented by the men's and women's handball teams. A total of 32 athletes.

=== Men's tournament ===
Team

- Damir Batinović
- Hrvoje Batinović
- Filip Gavranović
- Igor Karačić
- Marino Marić
- Marko Matić
- Jerko Matulić
- Marko Mrđenović
- Ivan Pešić
- Ivan Slišković
- Lovro Šprem
- Ivan Stevanović
- Tim Thoss
- Nik Tominec
- Josip Vidović
- Stefan Vujić

Preliminary round

Group B
Team	Pld	W	D	L	GF	GA	GD	Pts
Croatia	4	3	0	1	120	109	+11	6
Egypt	4	3	0	1	111	94	+17	6
Slovenia	4	2	1	1	134	117	+17	5
Tunisia	4	1	1	2	107	111	−4	3
Greece	4	0	0	4	80	121	−41	0

=== Women's tournament ===
Team

- Sonja Bašić
- Andrea Čović
- Žana Čović
- Dragica Džono
- Lana Franković
- Nataša Janković
- Katarina Ježić
- Ivana Kapitanović
- Iva Milanović-Litre
- Ivana Milić
- Ekaterina Nemaškalo
- Petra Oštarijaš
- Iva Pongrac
- Martina Razum
- Jelena Vidović

Preliminary round

Group B
Team	Pld	W	D	L	GF	GA	GD	Pts
Slovenia	4	3	1	0	118	98	+20	7
Croatia	4	2	1	1	108	116	−8	5
Spain	4	2	0	2	93	80	+13	4
Tunisia	4	2	0	2	117	108	+9	4
North Macedonia	4	0	0	4	82	116	−34	0

== Judo ==
Athlete	Event	Round of 16	Quarterfinals	Semifinals	Repechage	Final / BM	
Athlete	Event	Opposition Result	Opposition Result	Opposition Result	Opposition Result	Opposition Result	Rank
Tomislav Marijanović	Men's −81 kg	BYE	Carollo (ITA); L 010-100	BYE	Abdelaal (EGY); W 000–000	Joubert (FRA); W 100–000	3rd place, bronze medalist(s)
Marijana Mišković	Women's −63 kg	Shammas (LIB); W 101–000	Nikoloska (MKD); W 120–000	Gwend (ITA); W 000–000	BYE	Miloševič (SLO); W 110–000	1st place, gold medalist(s)

== Karate ==
Men

Athlete	Event	Round of 16	Quarterfinals	Semifinals	Repechage	Final / BM	
Athlete	Event	Opposition Result	Opposition Result	Opposition Result	Opposition Result	Opposition Result	Rank
Danil Domdjoni	−60 kg	Azzouzi (TUN); L 4-6	did not advance				

Women

Athlete	Event	Round of 16	Quarterfinals	Semifinals	Repechage	Final / BM	
Athlete	Event	Opposition Result	Opposition Result	Opposition Result	Opposition Result	Opposition Result	Rank
Jelena Kovačević	−55 kg	Ben Othman (TUN); W 1-0	Armentia (ESP); L 1-3	did not advance			
Ivana Bebek	−61 kg	BYE	Hansaoui (TUN); W 3-2	Erseker (TUR); L 1-2	BYE	Pasqua (ITA); L 2-3	5
Azra Saleš	−68 kg	Saadoun (TUN); W 3-0	Raković (MNE); W HAN	Colomar (ESP); L 0-3	BYE	Abdelkader (ALG); W 8-2	3rd place, bronze medalist(s)
Ana-Marija Čelan	+68 kg	BYE	Palacio (ESP); L 1-2	did not advance			

== Rowing ==
Women

Athlete	Event	Heats		Semifinals		Final	
Athlete	Event	Time	Rank	Time	Rank	Time	Rank
Marcela Milošević	Single sculls	8:04.03	4 Q	—N/a		7:44.25	3rd place, bronze medalist(s)

== Sailing ==
Men

Athlete	Event	Race											Net points	Final rank
Athlete	Event	1	2	3	4	5	6	7	8	9	10	M*	Net points	Final rank
Tonči Stipanović	Laser	1	2	1	1	~~6~~	6	1	3	1	1	3	20	1st place, gold medalist(s)
Šime Fantela; Igor Marenić	470	1	1	2	6	1	7	~~8~~	7	2	2	5	34	1st place, gold medalist(s)

Women

Athlete	Event	Race											Net points	Final rank
Athlete	Event	1	2	3	4	5	6	7	8	9	10	M*	Net points	Final rank
Tina Mihelić	Laser Radial	3	2	1	4	2	~~5~~	1	1	3	4	1	22	1st place, gold medalist(s)
Enia Ninčević; Romana Župan	470	3	2	~~6~~	3	1	4	4	3	1	4	4	29	2nd place, silver medalist(s)

== Shooting ==
Men

Athlete	Event	Qualification		Final	
Athlete	Event	Points	Rank	Points	Rank
Giovanni Cernogoraz	Trap	124	2 Q	14 / 15	3rd place, bronze medalist(s)
Bojan Đurković	10 m air rifle	615.3	6 Q	119.2	6
Bojan Đurković	50 m rifle 3 positions	1153	7 Q	408.0	6
Bojan Đurković	50 m rifle prone	613.1	7 Q	185.8	3rd place, bronze medalist(s)
Saša Špirelja	10 m air pistol	568	10	did not advance	

Women

Athlete	Event	Qualification		Final	
Athlete	Event	Points	Rank	Points	Rank
Marija Marović	10 m air pistol	377	9	did not advance	
Marija Marović	25 m pistol	568	9	did not advance	
Snježana Pejčić	10 m air rifle	407.6	10	did not advance	
Snježana Pejčić	50 m rifle 3 positions	577	5 Q	421.4	5

== Swimming ==
Men

Athlete	Event	Heat		Final	
Athlete	Event	Time	Rank	Time	Rank
Kristijan Mamić	100 m freestyle S10	1:01.94	7 Q	1:01.43	7
Kristijan Vincetić	100 m freestyle S10	1:00.47	5 Q	1:00.68	6

Women

Athlete	Event	Heat		Final	
Athlete	Event	Time	Rank	Time	Rank
Sanja Jovanović	50 m backstroke	29.14	3 Q	28.48 GR	1st place, gold medalist(s)
Marcela Mikulčić	100 m freestyle S10	1:20.69	6 Q	1:19.33	6
Nataša Sobočan	100 m freestyle S10	1:27.70	7 Q	1:27.46	7

== Volleyball ==
=== Beach ===
Athlete	Event	Preliminary round	Standing	Quarterfinals	Semifinals	Final / BM	
Athlete	Event	Opposition Score	Standing	Opposition Score	Opposition Score	Opposition Score	Rank
Pero Križanović; Nikša Dell'Orco	Men's	Pool B Gavira – Herrera (ESP); L 0 – 2 (13–21, 11–21); Sahin – Gogtepe (TUR); L 0 – 2 (13–21, 11–21)	3	did not advance			

=== Indoor ===
==== Women's tournament ====
Team

- Samanta Fabris
- Karla Klarić
- Laura Miloš
- Bernarda Ćutuk
- Ivona Ćaćić
- Bernarda Brčić
- Mirta Bašelović
- Iva Jurišić
- Lucija Mlinar
- Anamarija Miljak
- Martina Malević
- Katarina Pilepić

Standings

Pos	Team	Pld	W	L	Pts	SW	SL	SR	SPW	SPL	SPR
1	Italy	2	2	0	6	6	0	MAX	155	108	1.435
2	Croatia	2	1	1	2	3	5	0.600	154	177	0.870
3	France	2	0	2	1	2	6	0.333	155	179	0.866

Results

Date	Time		Score		Set 1	Set 2	Set 3	Set 4	Set 5	Total	Report
22-Jun	18:00	France	2–3	Croatia	25-21	23-25	17-25	25-13	12-15	102–0	
24-Jun	15:30	Croatia	0–3	Italy	15-25	21-25	19-25			55–0	

== Water polo ==
Croatia will be represented by men's water polo team.

=== Men's tournament ===
Team

- Josip Pavić
- Marko Bijač
- Nikša Dobud
- Ivan Krapić
- Andro Bušlje
- Ivan Milaković
- Luka Lončar
- Sandro Sukno
- Petar Muslim
- Luka Bukić
- Maro Joković
- Paulo Obradović
- Anđelo Šetka

Standings

Team	Pld	W	D	L	GF	GA	GD	Pts
Croatia	2	2	0	0	25	11	+14	4
Spain	2	1	0	1	20	11	+9	2
Turkey	2	0	0	2	7	30	−23	0

Results

June 19, 2013; 19:30	Report	Croatia	8–7	Spain	Çiftlikköy Campus Swimming Pool, Mersin; Referees: Reemnet (NED) and Collantoni (ITA)
June 19, 2013; 19:30	Report	Score by quarters: 3 – 0, 2 – 2, 3 – 1, 0 – 4			Çiftlikköy Campus Swimming Pool, Mersin; Referees: Reemnet (NED) and Collantoni (ITA)
June 19, 2013; 19:30	Report	Obradović 3	Goals	Alarcón, Español 2	Çiftlikköy Campus Swimming Pool, Mersin; Referees: Reemnet (NED) and Collantoni (ITA)

June 22, 2013; 19:30	Report	Turkey	4–17	Croatia	Çiftlikköy Campus Swimming Pool, Mersin; Referees: Miskovic (SRB) and Collantoni (ITA)
June 22, 2013; 19:30	Report	Score by quarters: 1-5, 1-6, 1-4, 1-2			Çiftlikköy Campus Swimming Pool, Mersin; Referees: Miskovic (SRB) and Collantoni (ITA)
June 22, 2013; 19:30	Report	Hantal 2	Goals	Muslim 5	Çiftlikköy Campus Swimming Pool, Mersin; Referees: Miskovic (SRB) and Collantoni (ITA)

=== Semifinals ===
June 23, 2013; 19:30	Report	Croatia	7–5	Italy	Çiftlikköy Campus Swimming Pool, Mersin; Referees: Kokaragac (TUR) and Miskovic (SRB)
June 23, 2013; 19:30	Report	Score by quarters: 2-2, 2-2, 0-1, 3-0			Çiftlikköy Campus Swimming Pool, Mersin; Referees: Kokaragac (TUR) and Miskovic (SRB)
June 23, 2013; 19:30	Report	Bušlje, Obradović 2	Goals	Giorgetti, Figlioli 2	Çiftlikköy Campus Swimming Pool, Mersin; Referees: Kokaragac (TUR) and Miskovic (SRB)

=== Final ===
June 25, 2013; 19:30	Report	Spain	9–11	Croatia	Çiftlikköy Campus Swimming Pool, Mersin; Referees: Matache (ROU) and Collantoni (ITA)
June 25, 2013; 19:30	Report	Score by quarters: 3-2, 2-4, 3-3, 1-2			Çiftlikköy Campus Swimming Pool, Mersin; Referees: Matache (ROU) and Collantoni (ITA)
June 25, 2013; 19:30	Report	Español, Mallarach 2	Goals	Sukno 4	Çiftlikköy Campus Swimming Pool, Mersin; Referees: Matache (ROU) and Collantoni (ITA)

== Water skiing ==
Men

Athlete	Event	Heat			Final	
Athlete	Event	Round 1	Round 2	Rank	Points	Rank
Feruccio Mužić	Slalom	3.50 / 58 / 13.00	2.50 / 58 / 14.25	1 Q	2.00 / 58 / 13.00	4
Pavle Zobundžija	Slalom	4.00 / 46 / 18.25	5.00 / 46 / 18.25	6	did not advance	

== Wrestling ==
Men's Greco-Roman

Athlete	Event	Round of 16	Quarterfinal	Semifinal	Repechage	Final / BM	
Athlete	Event	Opposition Result	Opposition Result	Opposition Result	Opposition Result	Opposition Result	Rank
Dominik Etlinger	−66 kg	BYE	Navarro (ESP); W 2–0 ^{PO}	Yuksel (TUR); L 1–2 ^{PP}	BYE	Hendy (EGY); W 2–1 ^{PP}	3rd place, bronze medalist(s)
Neven Žugaj	−74 kg	Ayt Okram (TUN); W 2–0 ^{PO}	Ouakali (ALG); W 2–0 ^{PO}	Guenot (FRA); W 2–0 ^{PO}	BYE	Kuş (TUR); L 0–2 ^{PO}	2nd place, silver medalist(s)
Nenad Žugaj	−84 kg	Parisi (ITA); W 2–0 ^{PO}	Ghanem (EGY); W 2–0 ^{PO}	Diong (FRA); L 0–1 ^{VT}	BYE	Samurgashev (MNE); W 2–0 ^{PO}	3rd place, bronze medalist(s)
