= Volleyball at the 2013 Mediterranean Games – Women's team rosters =

This article shows the rosters of all participating teams at the women's indoor volleyball tournament at the 2013 Mediterranean Games in Mersin.

== Croatia ==
No.	Name	Date of birth	Position	Club
-	Igor Lovrinov	21 July 1963	coach	(Croatia) ŽOK Rijeka
1	Martina Malević	7 December 1990	libero	
3	Katarina Pilepić	14 July 1994	opposite	(Croatia) ŽOK Rijeka
4	Iva Jurišić	24 March 1994	middle blocker	(Croatia) Mladost Zagabria
7	Bernarda Ćutuk	22 December 1990	middle blocker	(Germany) SC Potsdam
8	Anamarija Miljak	19 April 1993	opposite	(Croatia) ŽOK Vukovar
9	Lucija Mlinar	6 May 1995	outside hitter	(Croatia) Mladost Zagabria
10	Laura Miloš	20 October 1994	outside hitter	
12	Mirta Bašelović			(Croatia) ŽOK Spalato
13	Samanta Fabris	8 February 1992	opposite	(Italy) Chieri Torino VC
14	Karla Klarić	5 September 1994	outside hitter	(Switzerland) Volero Zurigo
15	Bernarda Brčić	12 May 1991	setter	(Croatia) ŽOK Rijeka
18	Ivona Čačić	11 March 1994	setter	

== France ==
No.	Name	Date of birth	Position	Club
-	Fabrice Vial	18 April 1969	coach	
1	Myriam Kloster	4 August 1989	middle blocker	(France) Vennelles VB
2	Astrid Souply	21 July 1993	outside hitter	(France) Amiens Volley
5	Laura Ong	30 April 1989	libero	(France) Vennelles VB
6	Clémentine Druenne	5 December 1993	outside hitter	(France) Nantes Volley
7	Lauriane Truchetet	7 April 1984	setter	(France) Terville Florange OC
8	Leyla Tuifua	17 October 1986	setter	(France) Vennelles VB
9	Julie Oliveira	1 April 1995	opposite	(France) Quimper Volley 29
10	Maëva Orlé	8 May 1991	middle blocker	(France) ES Le Cannet
11	Marion Gauthier	13 February 1993	middle blocker	(France) Nantes Volley
12	Déborah Ortschitt	10 June 1987	libero	(France) RC de Cannes
15	Julie Mollinger	27 September 1990	outside hitter	(France) Vandœuvre VB
17	Élisabeth Fedèle	11 January 1994	outside hitter	(France) ES Le Cannet

== Greece ==
No.	Name	Date of birth	Position	Club
-	Ioannis Kalmazidis	16 June 1968	coach	
2	Maria-Eleni Artakianou	21 May 1994	libero	
5	Athina Papafotiou	23 August 1989	setter	(Greece) AEK Atene
6	Eleni Kiosi	27 February 1985	opposite	
7	Georgia Lamprousi	27 January 1993	middle blocker	
8	Izabel Ivanova	7 January 1992	outside hitter	
9	Evangelia Merteki	29 April 1991	outside hitter	
11	Panagiota Dioti	13 November 1992	opposite	
12	Evangelia Chantava	26 October 1990	outside hitter	(Turkey) Karşıyaka Izmir
13	Aikaterina Giota	3 July 1990	middle blocker	
14	Styliani Christodoulou	19 July 1991	setter	(Greece) Olympiakos
15	Maria Genitsaridi	3 June 1994	outside hitter	
18	María Lamprinídou	29 June 1986	middle blocker	(France) Quimper Volley 29

== Italy ==
No.	Name	Date of birth	Position	Club
-	Marco Mencarelli	23 February 1963	coach	
1	Floriana Bertone	19 November 1992	middle blocker	(Italy) Azzurra S. Casciano
2	Cristina Barcellini	20 November 1986	outside hitter	(Italy) Imoco Conegliano
3	Noemi Signorile	15 February 1990	setter	(Italy) Robursport Pesaro
6	Monica De Gennaro	8 January 1987	libero	(Italy) Robursport Pesaro
7	Raphaela Folie	7 March 1991	middle blocker	(Italy) GSO Villa Cortese
9	Chiara Di Iulio	5 May 1985	outside hitter	(Italy) Volley Bergamo
10	Laura Partenio	29 December 1991	outside hitter	(Italy) Tiboni Urbino
13	Valentina Arrighetti	26 January 1985	middle blocker	(Italy) Volley Bergamo
14	Valeria Caracuta	14 December 1987	setter	(Italy) FV Busto Arsizio
15	Alessia Gennari	3 November 1991	outside hitter	(Italy) Chieri Torino VC
16	Lucia Bosetti	9 July 1989	outside hitter	(Italy) River Piacenza
17	Valentina Diouf	10 January 1993	opposite	(Italy) Volley Bergamo

== Slovenia ==
No.	Name	Date of birth	Position	Club
-	Oleg Gorbachov		coach	
2	Valentina Založnik			
3	Mojca Božič	30 March 1992	setter	(Slovenia) OK Spodnja Šempeter
4	Iza Mlakar	14 November 1995	opposite	(Slovenia) Branik Maribor
5	Angelina Ajnihar	15 March 1990	setter	(Slovenia) OK Formis Hoče
6	Elena Kučej	3 December 1994	middle blocker	(Slovenia) Branik Maribor
7	Urška Igličar	17 March 1995	outside hitter	(Slovenia) Branik Maribor
9	Saša Planinšec	2 June 1995	outside hitter	(Slovenia) Branik Maribor
10	Sara Valenčič	22 August 1990	outside hitter	(Belgium) Dauphines Charleroi
12	Meta Jerala	26 September 1991	libero	
15	Sara Hutinski	20 June 1991	middle blocker	(Slovenia) Branik Maribor
16	Monika Potokar	18 September 1987	outside hitter	(France) Hain. Valenciennes
17	Živa Recek			

== Turkey ==
No.	Name	Date of birth	Position	Club
-	Massimo Barbolini	29 August 1964	coach	(Turkey) Galatasaray SK
1	Güldeniz Önal	25 March 1986	outside hitter	(Turkey) VakıfBank Istanbul
3	Gizem Güreşen	14 January 1987	libero	(Turkey) VakıfBank Istanbul
5	Ergül Avcı	24 July 1987	middle blocker	(Turkey) VakıfBank Istanbul
6	Polen Uslupehlivan	27 August 1990	opposite	(Turkey) VakıfBank Istanbul
7	Seda Tokatlıoğlu	26 June 1986	opposite	(Turkey) Fenerbahçe SK
8	Bahar Toksoy	6 February 1988	middle blocker	(Turkey) VakıfBank Istanbul
9	Özge Kırdar	26 June 1985	setter	(Turkey) Eczacıbaşı Istanbul
10	Gözde Kırdar	26 June 1985	outside hitter	(Turkey) VakıfBank Istanbul
11	Naz Aydemir	14 August 1990	setter	(Turkey) VakıfBank Istanbul
12	Esra Gümüş	2 October 1982	outside hitter	(Turkey) Eczacıbaşı Istanbul
16	Büşra Cansu	16 July 1990	middle blocker	(Turkey) Eczacıbaşı Istanbul
17	Neslihan Demir	9 December 1983	opposite	(Turkey) Eczacıbaşı Istanbul
