= Volleyball at the 2013 Mediterranean Games =

The volleyball tournaments at the 2013 Mediterranean Games in Mersin took place between 22 June and 29 June. Preliminaries of the tournament were held at Toroslar Sports Hall in Mersin while the finals were held at the Servet Tazegül Arena in Mersin.

== Medal summary ==
=== Events ===
Event	Gold	Silver	Bronze
Men	Italy	Tunisia	France
Women	Italy (ITA); Floriana Bertone; Cristina Barcellini; Noemi Signorile; Monica De Gennaro; Raphaela Folie; Chiara Di Iulio; Laura Partenio; Valentina Arrighetti; Valeria Caracuta; Alessia Gennari; Lucia Bosetti; Valentina Diouf	Turkey (TUR); Guldeniz Onal; Gizem Karadayi; Ergul Avci; Polen Uslupehlivan; Seda Tokatlioglu; Bahar Toksoy; Özge Kırdar Çemberci; Gözde Kırdar Sonsırma; Naz Aydemir; Esra Gumus; Busra Cansu; Neslihan Darnel	Croatia (CRO); Martina Malević; Katarina Pilepić; Iva Jurišić; Bernarda Ćutuk; Anamarija Miljak; Lucija Mlinar; Laura Miloš; Mirta Baselović; Samanta Fabris; Karla Klarić; Bernarda Brčić; Ivona Čačić

== Participating nations ==
Following nations have applied to compete in volleyball tournaments. At least six nations competing is the requirement for tournaments to be held. None of the Asian nations opted to compete in any of the tournaments while none of the African nations entered the women's tournament.

Men

Federation	Nation
CAVB Africa	Algeria; Egypt; Tunisia
CEV Europe	France; Italy; Macedonia; Turkey

Women

Federation	Nation
CEV Europe	Croatia; France; Greece; Italy; Slovenia; Turkey
