= Handball at the 2013 Mediterranean Games =

- Venue: Lütfullah Aksungur Sports Hall; Yüreğir Serinevler Arena
- Dates: 22–30 June
- Nations: 12
- Teams: 10 (men); 10 (women)

Champions
- Men: Egypt
- Women: Serbia

The handball tournaments at the 2013 Mediterranean Games in Mersin took place between 22 June and 30 June. The men's tournament was held at the Lütfullah Aksungur Sports Hall, while the women's tournament was held at the Yüreğir Serinevler Arena. Both handball venues are in Adana.

== Medal table ==
* Host nation (Turkey)

Rank	Nation	Gold	Silver	Bronze	Total
1	Egypt	1	0	0	1
1	Serbia	1	0	0	1
3	Croatia	0	1	1	2
4	Slovenia	0	1	0	1
5	Turkey*	0	0	1	1
Totals (5 entries)		2	2	2	6

== Medal summary ==
=== Events ===
Event	Gold	Silver	Bronze
Men	Egypt (EGY) Karim Abdelrahim; Ahmed Abdelrahman; Mamdouh Abouebaid; Mohamed Bakir El-Nakib; Mahmoud Eid; Ahmed El-Ahmar; Mohamed El-Bassiouny; Ibrahim El-Masry; Ahmed El-Wan; Islam Hassan; Karim Hendawy; Amr Khalifa; Mohamed Mamdouh Shebib; Amr Mohamed; Mahmoud Radwan; Ali Zein	Croatia (CRO) Damir Batinović; Hrvoje Batinović; Filip Gavranović; Igor Karačić; Marino Marić; Marko Matić; Jerko Matulić; Marko Mrđenović; Ivan Pešić; Ivan Slišković; Lovro Šprem; Ivan Stevanović; Tim Thoss; Nik Tominec; Josip Vidović; Stefan Vujić	Turkey (TUR) Şenol Boyar; Tuğrul Bulduk; Tuğberk Çatkın; Can Çelebi; Ramazan Döne; Uğur Erceylan; Onur Ersin; Taner Günay; Alican Göçmen; Coşkun Göktepe; Durmuş Mutlu; Taner Öymen; Emre Öz; Tolga Özbahar; Yunus Özmusul; Alp Eren Pektaş
Women	Serbia (SRB) Jovana Bartošić-Atanasković; Dragana Cvijić; Tamara Georgijev; Sandra Filipović; Ana Kačarević; Katarina Krpež; Maja Radojičić; Sanja Radosavljević; Sanja Rajović; Jovana Risović; Katarina Stepanović; Jovana Stoiljković; Marijana Tanić; Jelena Trifunović; Jelena Živković; Marina Živković	Slovenia (SLO) Katja Čerenjak; Sanja Gregorc; Ana Gros; Neli Irman; Nina Jeriček; Lina Krhlikar; Barbara Lazović; Miša Marinček; Tamara Mavsar; Maxim Eva Pelikan; Ana Petrinja; Sergeja Stefanišin; Maja Šon; Urška Vidič; Branka Zec; Maja Zrnec	Croatia (CRO) Sonja Bašić; Andrea Čović; Žana Čović; Dragica Džono; Lana Franković; Nataša Janković; Katarina Ježić; Ivana Kapitanović; Iva Milanović-Litre; Ivana Milić; Ekaterina Nemaškalo; Petra Oštarijaš; Iva Pongrac; Martina Razum; Jelena Vidović

== Participating nations ==
Following nations have applied to compete in handball tournaments. At least six nations competing is the requirement for tournaments to be held. None of the Asian nations opted to compete in any of the tournaments.

Men

Federation	Nation
CAHB Africa	Algeria; Egypt; Tunisia
EHF Europe	Croatia; Greece; Italy; Macedonia; Serbia; Slovenia; Turkey

Women

Federation	Nation
CAHB Africa	Algeria; Tunisia
EHF Europe	Croatia; Italy; Macedonia; Montenegro; Serbia; Slovenia; Spain; Turkey
