= Lauriane =

Lauriane is a given name. Notable people with the name include:

- Lauriane Doumbouya, First Lady of Guinea
- Lauriane Genest (born 1998), Canadian racing cyclist
- Lauriane Gilliéron (born 1984), Swiss actress, model and beauty pageant titleholder
- Lauriane Nolot (born 1998), French kitesurfer
- Lauriane Pontat (born 1992), French synchronized swimmer
- Lauriane Rougeau (born 1990), Canadian ice hockey
- Lauriane Truchetet (born 1984), French volleyball player
- Lauriane Vergé, Wallisian politician
