= Tuifua =

Tuifua, Tuifu'a, or Tuʻifua is a surname. Notable people with the surname include:

- Isaia Tuifua (born 1987), Samoan rugby union player
- Leyla Tuifua (born 1986), French volleyball player
- Taiasina Tuifua (born 1984), Samoan rugby union player
- Tevita Tuʻifua (born 1975), Tongan rugby union player
