= Nina Jeriček =

Slovenian handball player

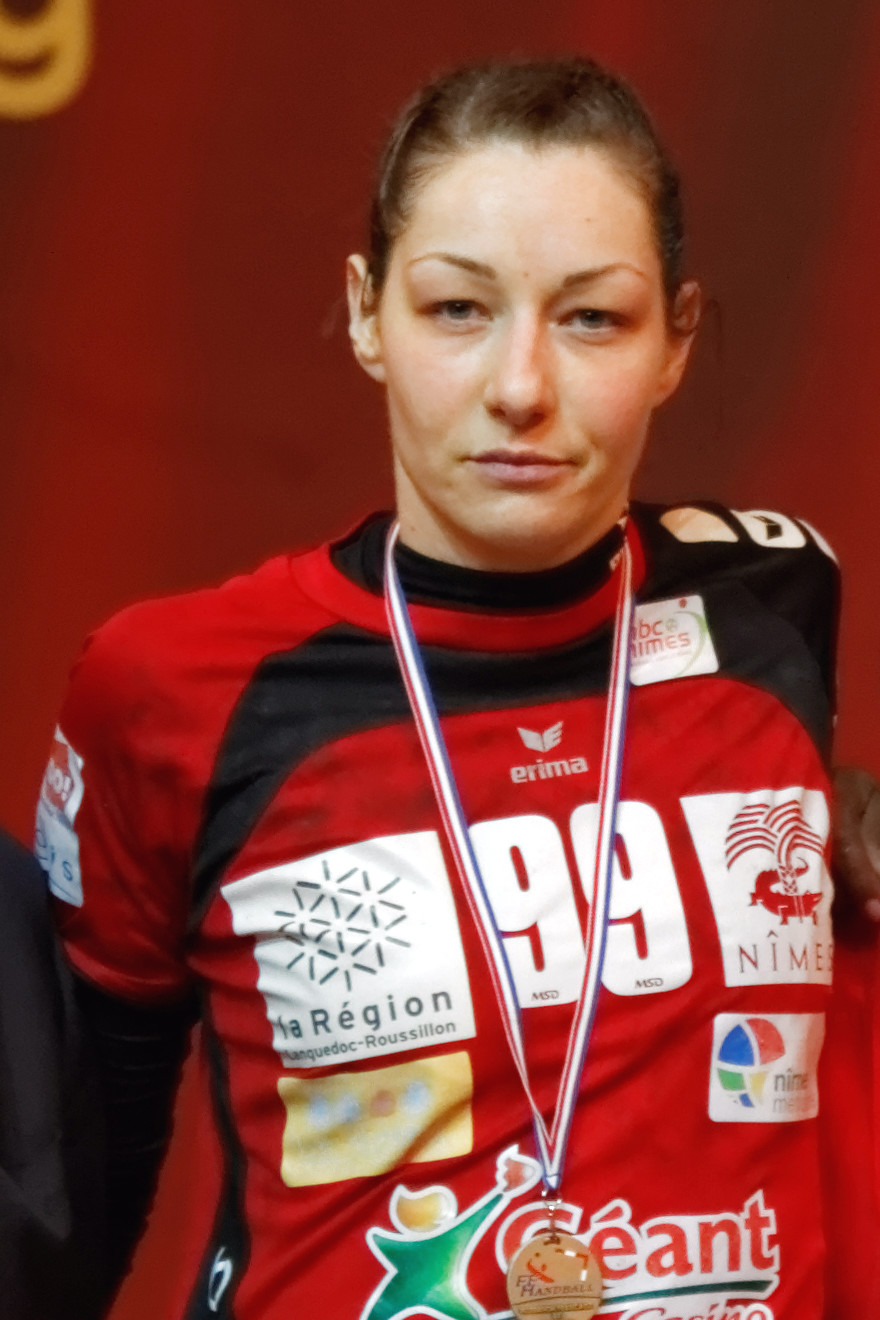

Personal information
- Nationality: Slovenian
- Born: 10 April 1984 (age 42) Celje, Slovenia
- Height: 1.72 m (5 ft 7 1/2 in)

Sport
- Sport: Handball
- Position: Centre back
- Current club: RK Krim
- Number: 9
National team
Years	Team	Apps	(Gls)
–	Slovenia	46	(106)
Medal record
Women's handball
Representing Slovenia
Mediterranean Games
Silver medal – second place	2013 Mersin	Team

Nina Jeriček (born 10 April 1984) is a Slovenian handballer who plays for RK Krim and the Slovenian national team.

She participated at the 2016 European Women's Handball Championship.
