= Sailing at the 2013 Mediterranean Games =

- Venue: Mersin Marina
- Dates: 21–27 June

The sailing competitions at the 2013 Mediterranean Games in Mersin took place between 21 June and 27 June in front of the Mersin Marina.

Athletes competed in four Olympic classes.

== Schedule ==
| FR | Fleet Racing | F | Medal Race |

| Event↓/Date → | Fri 21 | Sat 22 | Sun 23 | Mon 24 | Tue 25 | Wed 26 | Thu 27 |
|---|---|---|---|---|---|---|---|
| Men's Laser | FR | | | | FR | | F |
| Men's 470 | FR | | | | FR | | F |
| Women's Laser Radial | FR | | | | FR | | F |
| Women's 470 | FR | | | | FR | | F |

== Medal summary ==
=== Medal table ===
Key:

* Host nation (Turkey)

| Rank | Nation | Gold | Silver | Bronze | Total |
|---|---|---|---|---|---|
| 1 | Croatia | 3 | 1 | 0 | 4 |
| 2 | France | 1 | 1 | 0 | 2 |
| 3 | Spain | 0 | 1 | 1 | 2 |
| 4 | Greece | 0 | 1 | 0 | 1 |
| 5 | Italy | 0 | 0 | 2 | 2 |
| 6 | Turkey* | 0 | 0 | 1 | 1 |
| Totals (6 entries) | | 4 | 4 | 4 | 12 |

=== Men's events ===
| Event | Gold | Silver | Bronze |
|---|---|---|---|
| Laser class | Tonči Stipanović; Croatia | Jean-Baptiste Bernaz; France | Jesus Rogel; Spain |
| 470 class | Croatia (CRO); Šime Fantela; Igor Marenić | Greece (GRE); Panagiotis Mantis; Pavlos Kagialis | Italy (ITA); Francesco Falcetelli; Enrico Clementi |

=== Women's events ===
| Event | Gold | Silver | Bronze |
|---|---|---|---|
| Laser Radial | Tina Mihelić; Croatia | Alicia Cebrián; Spain | Nazlı Çağla Dönertaş; Turkey |
| 470 class | France (FRA); Camille Lecointre; Mathilde Géron | Croatia (CRO); Enia Ninčević; Romana Župan | Italy (ITA); Francesca Komatar; Sveva Carraro |
