= Boxing at the 2013 Mediterranean Games – Men's heavyweight =

The men's heavyweight competition of the boxing events at the 2013 Mediterranean Games in Mersin, Turkey, was held between June 21 and 26 at the Tarsus Arena.

Like all Mediterranean Games boxing events, the competition was a straight single-elimination tournament. Both semifinal losers were awarded bronze medals, so no boxers competed again after their first loss.

== Schedule ==
All times are Eastern European Summer Time (UTC+3).

Date	Time	Round
June 21, 2013	21:15	Round of 16
June 22, 2013	21:00	Quarterfinals
June 24, 2013	21:00	Semifinals
June 26, 2013	21:00	Final

== Results ==
=== Bracket ===
Round of 16
Josip Bepo Filipi (CRO)	3
Chouaib Bouloudinats (ALG)	0

Quarterfinals
Aboulaye Diane (FRA)	0
Josip Bepo Filipi (CRO)	3
Nikola Milacic (MNE)	3
Elmohamady Elalfy (EGY)	0
Fotios Arapoglou (GRE)	2
Alem Colpa (BIH)	1
Seyda Keser (TUR)	1
Fabio Turchi (ITA)	2

Semifinals
Josip Bepo Filipi (CRO)	2
Nikola Milacic (MNE)	1
Fotios Arapoglou (GRE)
Fabio Turchi (ITA)	TKOI

Finals
Josip Bepo Filipi (CRO)	0
Fabio Turchi (ITA)	3
