= Rowing at the 2013 Mediterranean Games – Women's single sculls =

The women's single sculls rowing event at the 2013 Mediterranean Games will be held from June 21–23 at the Seyhan Dam in Adana.

== Schedule ==
All times are Eastern European Summer Time (UTC+3).

Date	Time	Round
June 21, 2013	9:40	Heats
June 23, 2013	9:15	Final A

== Results ==
=== Heat 1 ===
Rank	Rowers	Country	Time	Notes
1	Iva Obradović	Serbia	7:42.78	FA
2	Giada Colombo	Italy	7:52.42	FA
3	Eleni Diamanti	Greece	8:01.79	FA
4	Marcela Milošević	Croatia	8:04.03	FA
5	Anja Šešum	Slovenia	8:19.01	FA

=== Final A ===
Rank	Rowers	Country	Time	Notes
1st place, gold medalist(s)	Iva Obradović	Serbia	7:39.04	
2nd place, silver medalist(s)	Giada Colombo	Italy	7:44.04	
3rd place, bronze medalist(s)	Marcela Milošević	Croatia	7:44.25	
4	Eleni Diamanti	Greece	7:48.14	
5	Anja Šešum	Slovenia	8:13.15	
