= Katja Čerenjak =

Slovenian handball player

Personal information
- Nationality: Slovenian
- Born: 6 September 1983 (age 43) Celje, Slovenia
- Height: 1.75 m (5 ft 9 in)

Sport
- Sport: Handball
- Position: Pivot
- Current club: ŽRK Celje
- Number: 33
National team
Years	Team	Apps	(Gls)
–	Slovenia	50	(58)
Medal record
Women's handball
Representing Slovenia
Mediterranean Games
Silver medal – second place	2013 Mersin	Team

Katja Čerenjak (born 6 September 1983) is a Slovenian handballer who plays for ŽRK Celje and the Slovenian national team.

She participated at the 2016 European Women's Handball Championship.
