= Lina Krhlikar =

Slovenian handball player

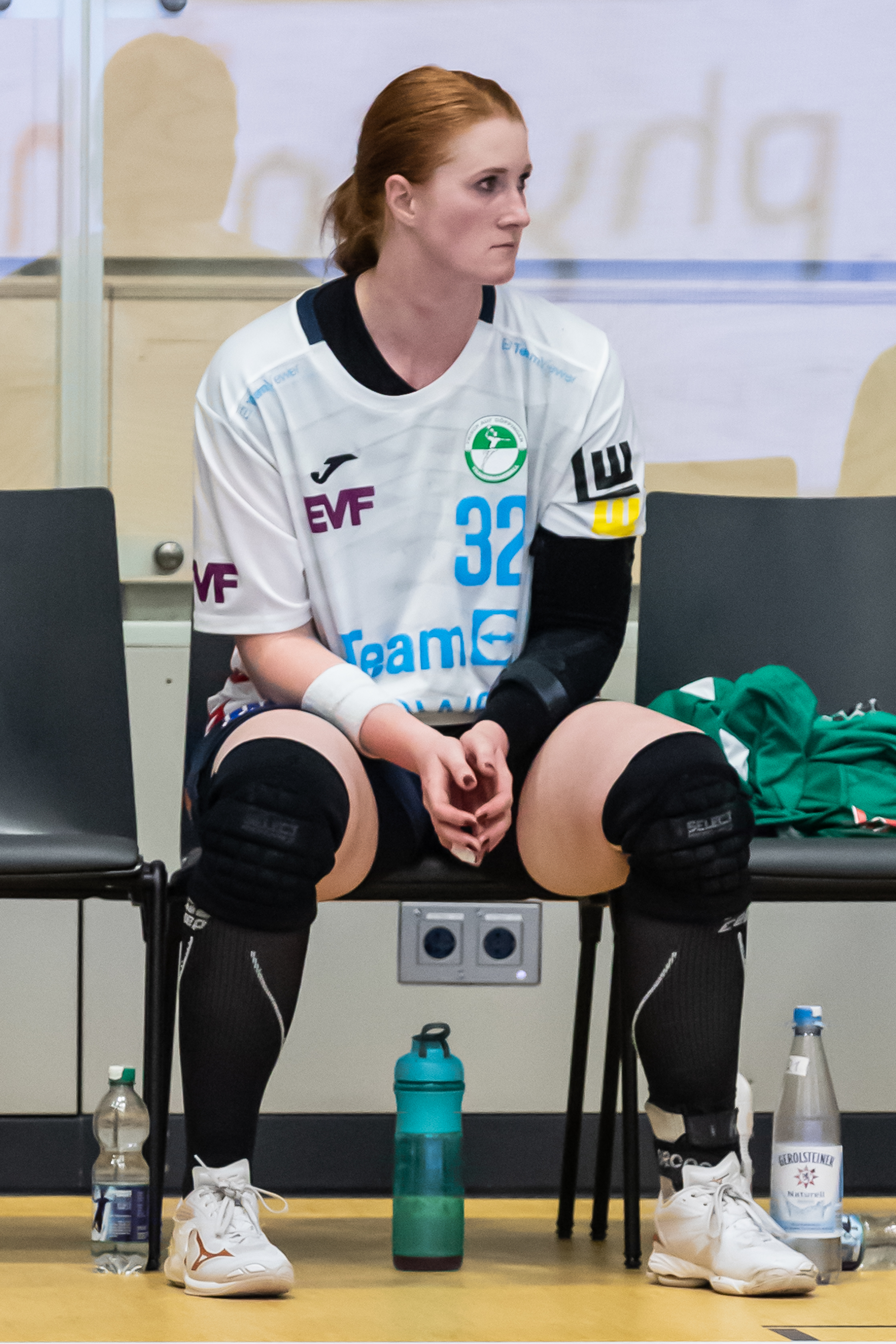

Personal information
- Nationality: Slovenian
- Born: 29 June 1989 (age 37) Ljubljana, Slovenia
- Height: 1.84 m (6 ft 0 in)

Sport
- Sport: Handball
- Position: Pivot
- Current club: Frisch Auf Göppingen
- Number: 32

Senior clubs
- Years: Team
- 2006–2008: RK Krim
- 2008–2009: RK Celeia Žalec
- 2009–2011: BM Remudas
- 2011–2012: HBC Nîmes
- 2012–2013: Cercle Dijon Bourgogne
- 2013–2014: HBC Celles-sur-Belle
- 2014–2015: TuS Weibern
- 2015–2022: Frisch Auf Göppingen
- 2022–2023: TSV Heiningen 1892
National team
Years	Team	Apps	(Gls)
–	Slovenia	65	(82)
Medal record
Women's handball
Representing Slovenia
Mediterranean Games
Silver medal – second place	2013 Mersin	Team

Lina Krhlikar (born 29 June 1989) is a Slovenian former handball player for the Slovenian national team.

She participated at the 2016 and 2018 European Women's Handball Championship, as well as the 2017 World Women's Handball Championship.

== Career ==
Krhlikar played from 2006 to 2008 for RK Krim. She then joined RK Celeia Žalec for a single season, before moving to Spanish top side team BM Remudas.

She then played three years in France for HBC Nîmes, Cercle Dijon Bourgogne and HBC Celles-sur-Belle. In 2014 she joined TuS Weibern. In January the same season she joined league rivals Frisch Auf Göppingen. Here she played for 7 years, before retiring from professional handball. She then played a single season for the lower league club TSV Heiningen 1892.
