= Iva Obradović =

Serbian rower

Medal record

Women's rowing

Representing Serbia

European Championships
Silver medal – second place	2011 Plovdiv	Double scull
Silver medal – second place	2012 Varese	Single scull

Mediterranean Games
Gold medal – first place	2013 Mersin	Single scull

World Rowing U23 Championships
Gold medal – first place	2005 Amsterdam	Single scull
Silver medal – second place	2006 Hazewinkel	Single scull

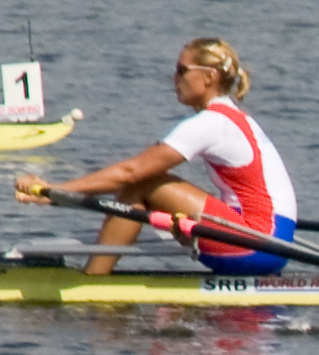
Iva Obradović

Iva Obradović (Serbian Cyrillic: Ива Обрадовић, born 6 May 1984 in Novi Sad, SR Serbia, Yugoslavia) is a rower from Serbia.

She won the silver medal in the women's double scull event at the 2011 European Rowing Championships in Plovdiv, Bulgaria.

Obradović participated at the 2008 Summer Olympics and finished fifth in the B final of the single scull.
