= Stefan Vujić =

Serbian handball player (born 1991)

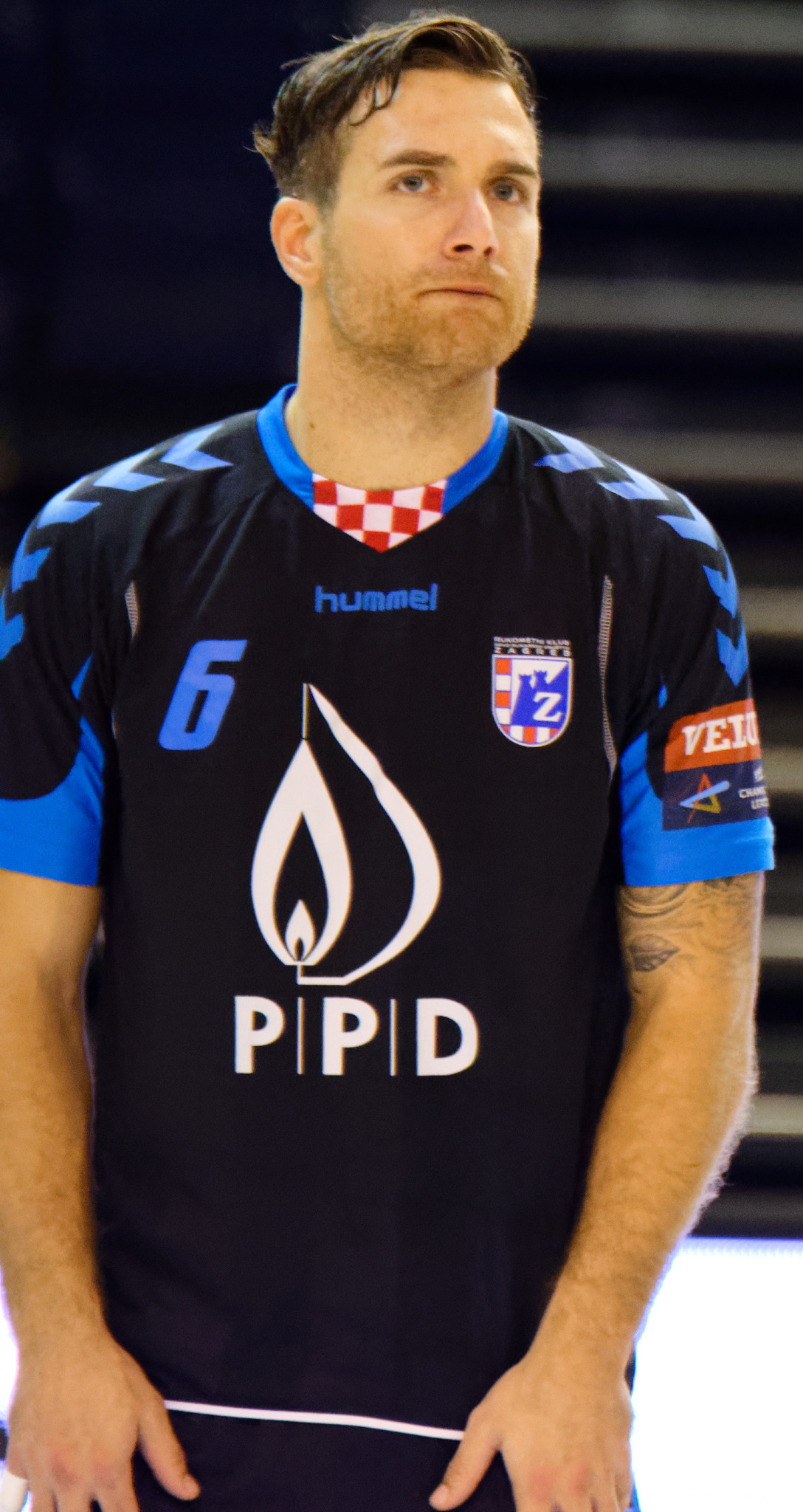

Personal information
- Nationality: Croatian/Serbian
- Born: 1 July 1991 (age 35) Rijeka, SR Croatia, SFR Yugoslavia
- Height: 1.92 m (6 ft 4 in)

Sport
- Sport: Handball
- Position: Centre back
- Current club: Minaur Baia Mare
- Number: 43

Senior clubs
- Years: Team
- –2013: RK Poreč
- 2013–2014: HBC Nantes
- 2014–2015: Istres OPH
- 2015–2017: RK Zagreb
- 2017–2019: Steaua București
- 2019–2021: Dinamo București
- 2021–: Minaur Baia Mare
National team
Years	Team		
2013	Croatia		
2017–	Serbia	33	(60)
Medal record
Mediterranean Games
Silver medal – second place	2013 Mersin	Team

Stefan Vujić (Serbian Cyrillic: Стефан Вујић; born 6 July 1991) is a Croatian-born Serbian handball player for Minaur Baia Mare and the Serbian national team.

== International honours ==
- EHF Cup:
  - Finalist: 2013

== National team ==
- Mediterranean Games
  - Runners-up: 2013 (with Croatia)
