= Mohamed Bakir El-Nakib =

Egyptian handball player (born 1974)

Personal information
- Nationality: Egyptian
- Born: 6 April 1974 (age 52)
- Height: 1.95 m (6 ft 5 in)

Sport
- Sport: Handball
- Position: Goalkeeper
- Current club: Alexandria SC
National team
Years	Team	Apps	(Gls)
–	Egypt	350	(0)
Medal record
African Championship
Gold medal – first place	2008 Angola	Team
All-Africa Games
Gold medal – first place	2011 Mozambique	Team
Mediterranean Games
Gold medal – first place	2013 Mersin	Team

Mohamed Bakir El-Nakib commonly known as Hamada El-Nakib (born 6 April 1974) is an Egyptian handball goalkeeper, playing on the Egypt men's national handball team. He has participated in four Olympics, in 1996 (6th place), 2000 (7th place), 2004 (12th place) and 2008 (10th place).

At the 2008 Olympics he was ranked as the third-best keeper when measuring the saving percent, saving 40 percent of the shots. He was part of the Egyptian team that won the African Handball Nations Championship in 2008, and qualified for the 2009 World Men's Handball Championship.
