= Samanta Fabris =

Croatian volleyball player (born 1992)

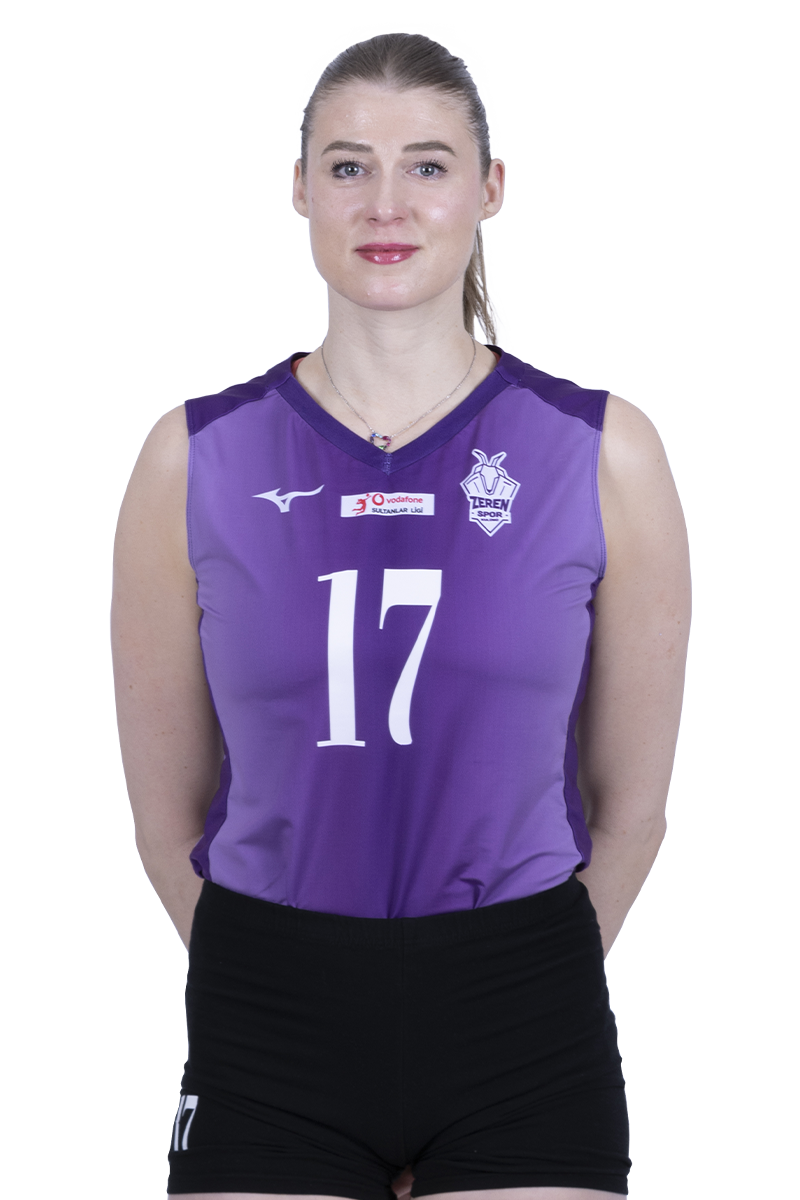
- Fabris in 2025

Personal information
- Born: 8 February 1992 (age 34); Pula, Croatia
- Height: 1.88 m (6 ft 2 in)
- Weight: 79 kg (174 lb)
- Spike: 322 cm (127 in)
- Block: 306 cm (120 in)

Volleyball information
- Current club: Çukurova Belediyesi

Career
Years	Teams
2008–2012; 2012–2013; 2013–2015; 2015–2016; 2016–2017; 2017–2019; 2019–2022; 2022–2023; 2023–2024; 2024-	ŽOK Rijeka; Chieri Volley; LJ Modena; AGIL Volley Novara; Pomi Casalmaggiore; Imoco Volley Conegliano; WVC Dynamo Kazan; Eczacıbaşı Dynavit; Çukurova Belediyesi; Zeren SK

National team
Croatia
Honours
Women's volleyball
Representing Croatia
FIVB Challenger Cup
Gold medal – first place	2022 Zadar
Mediterranean Games
Gold medal – first place	2018 Tarragona
Bronze medal – third place	2013 Mersin
European League
Silver medal – second place	2021 Ruse
Silver medal – second place	2019 Varaždin

Samanta Fabris (born 8 February 1992) is a Croatian professional volleyball player. She plays as opposite hitter for Turkish club Çukurova Belediyesi.

== Clubs ==
- (Croatia) ŽOK Rijeka (2008–2012)
- (Italy) Chieri Volley (2012–2013)
- (Italy) LJ Modena (2013–2015)
- (Italy) AGIL Volley Novara (2015–2016)
- (Italy) Pomi Casalmaggiore (2016–2017)
- (Italy) Imoco Volley Conegliano (2017–2019)
- (Russia) WVC Dynamo Kazan (2019–2022)
- (Turkey) Eczacıbaşı Dynavit (2022–2023)
- (Turkey) Zeren SK (2024–2025)

== International career ==
She is a member of the Croatia women's national volleyball team. Fabris was part of the Croatian national team at the 2014 FIVB Volleyball Women's World Championship in Italy, and 2021 Women's European Volleyball League, winning a silver medal.

== Awards ==
=== Club ===
Imoco Volley Conegliano

- Italian League: 2018

WVC Dynamo Kazan

- Russian Super League: 2020
- Russian Cup: 2019, 2020, 2021
