= Enia Ninčević =

Croatian sailor

Medal record

Sailing

Representing Croatia

European Championships
Silver medal – second place	2021 Thessaloniki	Women's 49er FX

Mediterranean Games
Silver medal – second place	2013 Mersin	Women's 470

Enia Ninčević (born 9 July 1990) is a Croatian sports sailor.

== Career ==
Ninčević was born on 9 July 1990 in Split, Croatia.

At the 2012 Summer Olympics, Ninčević competed in the women's 470 class where, alongside crewmate Romana Župan, she finished 17th.

At the 2013 Mediterranean Games in Mersin, Ninčević won silver.

At the 2021 49er & 49er FX European Championships in Thessaloniki, Greece, Ninčević won silver with her crewmate Mihaela de Micheli Vitturi.

At the 2024 Split CRO Melges Cup, Ninčević won silver at the helm of the Cezibordo.
