= Romana Župan =

Croatian sailor

Medal record

Sailing

Representing Croatia

Mediterranean Games
Silver medal – second place	2013 Mersin	Women's 470

Romana Župan (born 22 May 1987) is a Croatian sports sailor.

She was born in Zadar, Croatia. At the 2012 Summer Olympics, she competed in the women's 470 class where, alongside crewmate Enia Ninčević, she finished 17th.
