= Nik Tominec =

Swiss handball player

Personal information
- Nationality: Swiss
- Born: 26 March 1991 (age 35) Lucerne, Switzerland
- Height: 1.87 m (6 ft 2 in)

Sport
- Sport: Handball
- Position: Right wing
- Current club: Retired
- Number: 24

Youth career
- Years: Team
- –: BSV Borba Luzern

Senior clubs
- Years: Team
- 2009-2010: RD Koper
- 2010-2011: RK Maribor Branik
- 2011-2014: Kadetten Schaffhausen
- 2014-2015: HC Kriens-Luzern
- 2015-2023: Kadetten Schaffhausen
National team
Years	Team	Apps	(Gls)
2013-2018	Croatia	5	(3)
2018-	Switzerland	26	(18)
Medal record
Representing Croatia
Mediterranean Games
Silver medal – second place	2013 Mersin	Team
- Updated on 3 January 2024

Nik Tominec (born 26 March 1991) is a Swiss former handball player of Croatian descent, who played for the Swiss national team. Since 2023 he has been the sporting director at the Swiss club HC Kriens-Luzern.

He represented Switzerland at the 2020 European Men's Handball Championship, and at the 2021 World Men's Handball Championship.
