= Žana Čović =

Croatian handball player (born 1989)

Personal information
- Nationality: Croatian
- Born: 20 August 1989 (age 37) Trogir, Croatia
- Height: 1.80 m (5 ft 11 in)

Sport
- Sport: Handball
- Position: Right back
- Current club: Retired
- Number: 44

Senior clubs
- Years: Team
- –: ŽRK Trogir
- –: RK Lokomotiva Zagreb
- –: ŽRK Dalmatinka
- -2012: RK Lokomotiva Zagreb
- 2012-2013: RK Podravka Koprivnica
- 2013-201: SG BBM Bietigheim
- 2015-2018: MKS Zagłębie Lubin
- 2018: Kastamonu Belediyesi GSK
- 2018: Mosonmagyaróvári KC SE
National team
Years	Team	Apps	(Gls)
–	Croatia	41	(45)
Medal record
Mediterranean Games
Bronze medal – third place	2013 Mersin	Team

Žana Marić (née Čović; born 20 August 1989) is a Croatian former handball who played for the Croatian national team.
