= Ivana Kapitanović =

Croatian handball player (born 1994)

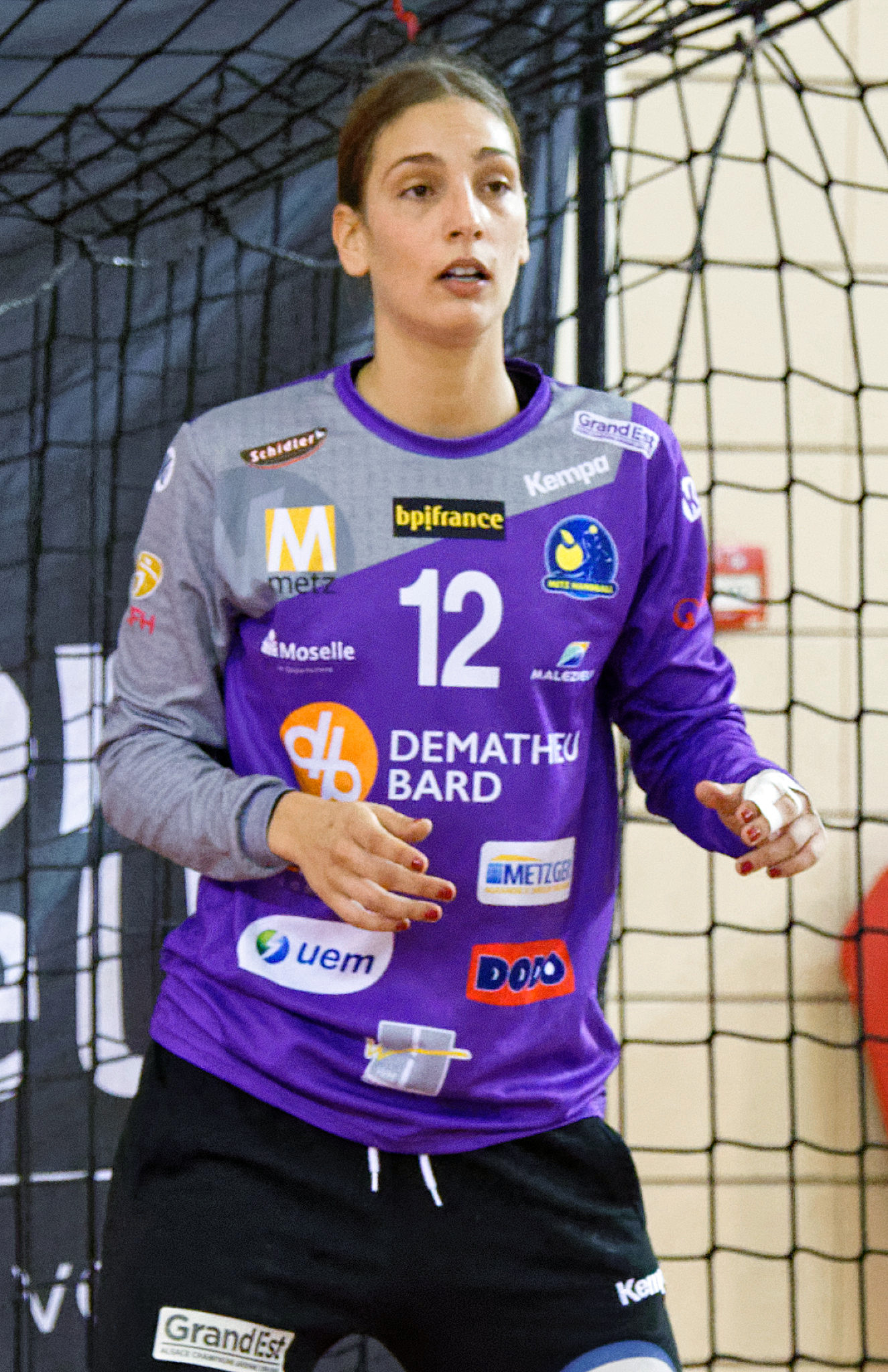

Personal information
- Nationality: Croatian
- Born: 17 September 1994 (age 32) Split, Croatia
- Height: 1.84 m (6 ft 0 in)

Sport
- Sport: Handball
- Position: Goalkeeper
- Current club: Minaur Baia Mare
- Number: 12

Senior clubs
- Years: Team
- 2009–2018: HC Podravka Vegeta
- 2018–2022: Metz Handball
- 2022–2024: Rapid București
- 2024: CS Gloria Bistrița-Năsăud
- 2025–2026: Handball Erice
- 2026–: Minaur Baia Mare
National team
Years	Team	Apps	(Gls)
–	Croatia	75	(6)
Medal record
Mediterranean Games
Bronze medal – third place	2013 Turkey	Team
- Updated on 29 October 2026

Ivana Kapitanović (born 17 September 1994) is a Croatian handballer for Minaur Baia Mare and the Croatian national team.

She participated at the 2018 European Women's Handball Championship. She was supposed to participate at the 2020 European Women's Handball Championship where was Croatia surprisingly won the bronze medal, however she was not played due to a severe knee injury, but she was at the reception of the national team in the Zagreb Airport received the medal which was handed to her by a former Metz Handball's teammate Ćamila Mičijević.

== Achievements ==
=== National ===
- Croatian First League:
  - Winner: 2010, 2011, 2012, 2013, 2015, 2016, 2017, 2018
- Croatian Cup:
  - Winner: 2010, 2011, 2012, 2013, 2015, 2016, 2017
- French Women's Handball Championship:
  - Winner: 2019, 2022
- Coupe de France:
  - Winner: 2019, 2022

=== Individual ===
- Croatian Player of the Year: 2019
