= Ivan Slišković =

Croatian handball player (born 1991)

Personal information
- Nationality: Croatian
- Born: 23 October 1991 (age 34) Split, Croatia
- Height: 1.98 m (6 ft 6 in)

Sport
- Sport: Handball
- Position: Left back
- Current club: RK Nexe

Senior clubs
- Years: Team
- 2011–2013: RK Nexe
- 2013–2015: RK Celje
- 2015: → Al Ahly (loan)
- 2015–2017: Telekom Veszprém
- 2017–2018: RK Celje
- 2018–2020: Frisch Auf Göppingen
- 2020–2022: FC Porto
- 2022–2023: TVB Stuttgart
- 2023–2026: Olympiacos Piraeus
National team
Years	Team	Apps	(Gls)
2013–2025	Croatia	62	(140)

Teams managed
- 2026–: RK Nexe (coach)
Medal record
European Championship
Bronze medal – third place	2016 Poland
Mediterranean Games
Silver medal – second place	2013 Mersin	Team

Ivan Slišković (born 23 October 1991) is a former Croatian handball player who manages RK Nexe.

He participated at the 2019 World Men's Handball Championship.
