= Andrea Čović =

Croatian handball player (born 1993)

Andrea Čanađija
Personal information
- Nationality: Croatian
- Born: 9 October 1993 (age 33) Sinj, Croatia
- Height: 1.75 m (5 ft 9 in)

Sport
- Sport: Handball
- Position: Pivot

Senior clubs
- Years: Team
- 2010–2015: HC Podravka Vegeta
- 2015–2018: HC Vardar
National team
Years	Team	Apps	(Gls)
–	Croatia	22	(19)
Medal record
Mediterranean Games
Bronze medal – third place	2013 Turkey	Team

Andrea Čanađija (née Čović; born 9 October 1993) is a retired Croatian handballer who last played for HC Vardar and the Croatian national team.

== International honours ==
- EHF Champions League:
  - Bronze Medalist: 2016
