= Karla Klarić =

Croatian volleyball player (born 1994)

Personal information
- Born: 5 September 1994 (age 32); Zagreb, Croatia
- Height: 1.90 m (6 ft 3 in)
- Weight: 81 kg (179 lb)
- Spike: 310 cm (120 in)
- Block: 300 cm (120 in)

Volleyball information
- Current club: GEN-I Volley

Career
Years	Teams
2010–2011; 2011–2014; 2014–2015; 2015–2016; 2016–2017; 2017–2018; 2018–2019; 2019–2020; 2020–2020; 2020–2021; 2021–2022; 2022; 2022–2023; 2023–	HAOK Mladost; Volero Zürich; CSM București; ASPTT Mulhouse; CSM Târgu Mureș; VBC Galina; VC Kanti Schaffhausen; Békéscsabai RSE; Olympiacos CFP; Fatum-Nyíregyháza; Gumma Bank Green Wings; Maccabi Haifa; Sm’Aesch Pfeffingen; GEN-I Volley

National team
Croatia
Honours
Women's volleyball
Representing Croatia
Mediterranean Games
Bronze medal – third place	2013 Mersin
European League
Silver medal – second place	2019 Varaždin

Karla Klarić (born 5 September 1994) is a Croatian volleyball player. She plays as outside hitter.

== Club career ==
In 2022, she played for the Israeli club Maccabi Haifa.

== International career ==
She is a member of the Croatia women's national volleyball team. She competed at the 2021 Women's European Volleyball League winning a silver medal.
