= Martina Malević =

Croatian volleyball player (born 1990)

Personal information
- Born: 7 December 1990 (age 35); Zagreb, SFR Yugoslavia
- Height: 1.73 m (5 ft 8 in)
- Weight: 64 kg (141 lb)
- Spike: 270 cm (110 in)
- Block: 255 cm (100 in)

Volleyball information
- Position: Libero

Career
Years	Teams
2008–2012; 2012–2014; 2014–2015; 2015–2016	HAOK Mladost; Amiens Longueau Métropole; Allianz MTV Stuttgart; HAOK Mladost

National team
Croatia
Honours
Women's volleyball
Representing Croatia
Mediterranean Games
Bronze medal – third place	2013 Mersin

Martina Malević (born 7 December 1990) is a Croatian volleyball player. She last played as libero for Croatian club HAOK Mladost.
