= Sonja Bašić =

Croatian handball player (born 1987)

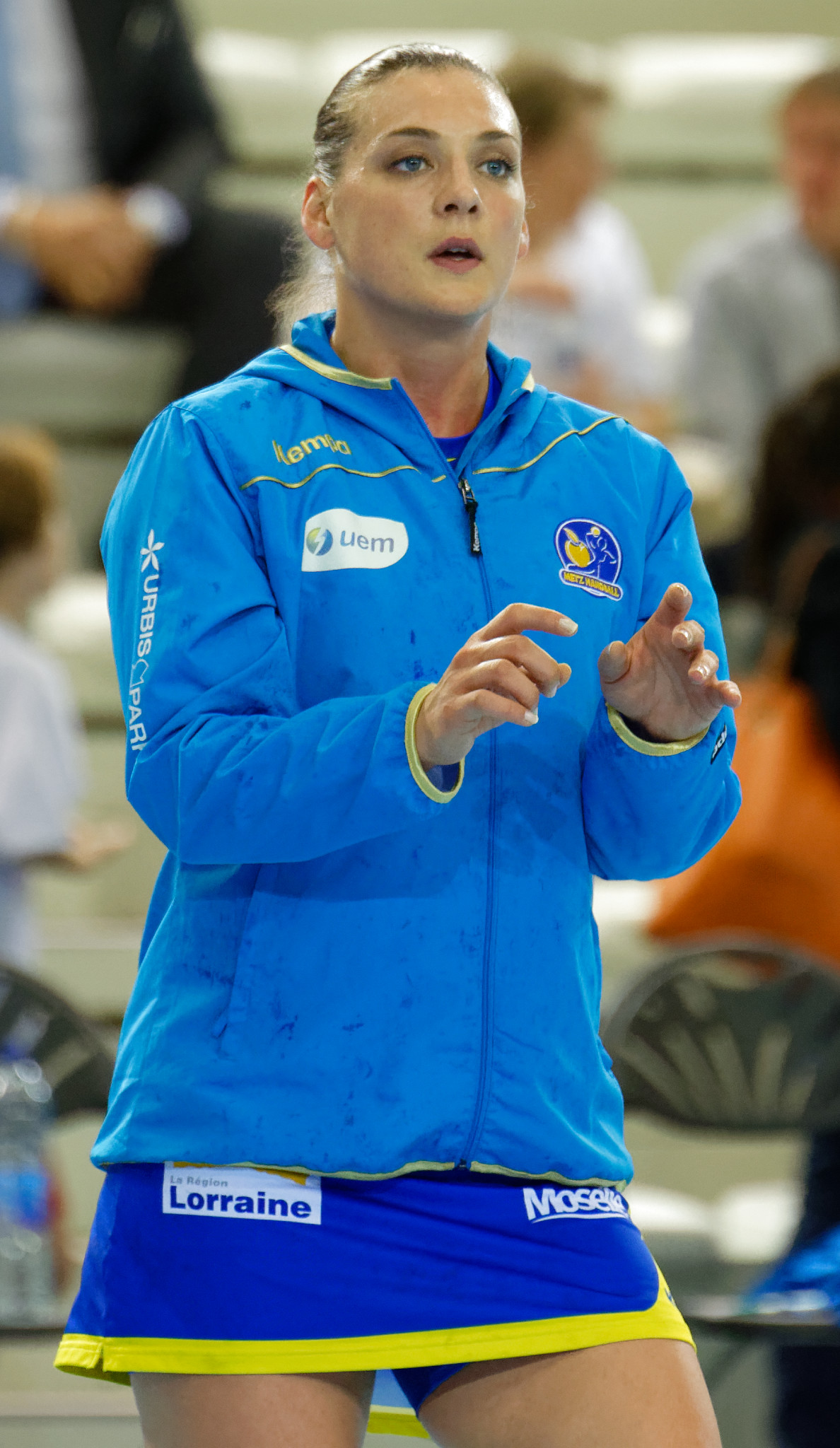

Personal information
- Nationality: Croatian
- Born: 26 November 1987 (age 38) Zagreb, SR Croatia, SFR Yugoslavia
- Height: 1.82 m (6 ft 0 in)

Sport
- Sport: Handball
- Position: Centre back
- Current club: Nantes Loire Atlantique Handball
- Number: 29

Senior clubs
- Years: Team
- 2006-2011: RK Tresnjevka Zagreb
- 2011-2012: RK Lokomotiva Zagreb
- 2012-2013: ŽRK Metalurg
- 2013-2015: RK Lokomotiva Zagreb
- 2015-2016: Metz Handball
- 2015-2017: Váci NKSE
- 2017-: Nantes Loire Atlantique Handball
National team
Years	Team	Apps	(Gls)
–	Croatia	65	(131)
Medal record
Mediterranean Games
Bronze medal – third place	2013 Mersin	Team

Sonja Bašić (born 26 November 1987) is a Croatian handball player for Nantes Loire Atlantique Handball and the Croatian national team.

She competed for the Croatian team at the 2012 Summer Olympics in London.

Her father is handball coach and former player Mirko Bašić.
