= Laura Miloš =

Croatian volleyball player (born 1994)

Personal information
- Born: 20 October 1994 (age 32); Poreč, Croatia
- Height: 1.78 m (5 ft 10 in)
- Weight: 70 kg (150 lb)
- Spike: 308 cm (121 in)
- Block: 298 cm (117 in)

Volleyball information
- Position: Outside hitter
- Current club: Levallois Paris Saint-Cloud

Career
Years	Teams
2011–2014; 2014–2018; 2018–2019; 2019–2022; 2022–2023; 2023–2024; 2024–2025; 2025–	OK Poreč; Oral Roberts Golden Eagles; Dauphines Charleroi; Saint-Raphael Var Volley-Ball; Saint-Cloud Paris SF; Béziers Volley; Radomka Radom; Levallois Paris Saint-Cloud

National team
Croatia
Honours
Women's volleyball
Representing Croatia
FIVB Challenger Cup
Gold medal – first place	2022 Zadar
Mediterranean Games
Bronze medal – third place	2013 Mersin
European League
Silver medal – second place	2021 Ruse

Laura Miloš (born 20 October 1994) is a Croatian volleyball player. She plays as outside hitter for French club Levallois Paris Saint-Cloud.

== International career ==
She is a member of the Croatia women's national volleyball team. She competed at the 2021 Women's European Volleyball League, winning a silver medal.
