= Marino Marić =

Croatian handball player (born 1990)

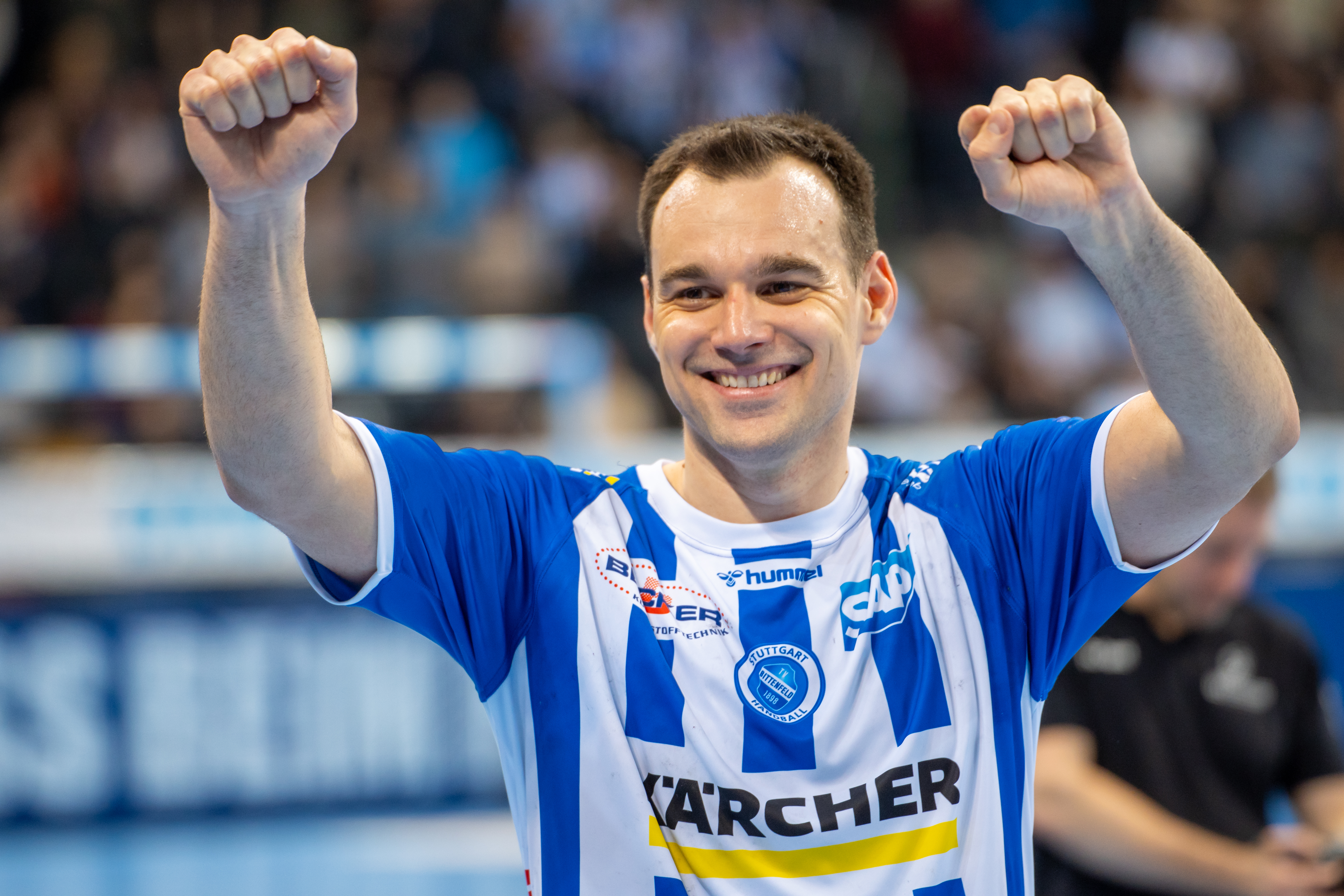

Personal information
- Nationality: Croatian
- Born: 1 June 1990 (age 36) Mostar, SFR Yugoslavia
- Height: 1.96 m (6 ft 5 in)

Sport
- Sport: Handball
- Position: Pivot
- Current club: TVB Stuttgart

Senior clubs
- Years: Team
- 2009–2014: Croatia Osiguranje Zagreb
- 2014: RK Maribor Branik
- 2014–2022: MT Melsungen
- 2022–2023: SC DHfK Leipzig
- 2023–: TVB Stuttgart
National team
| Years | Team | Apps | (Gls) |
| 2013– | Croatia | 85 | (180) |
Medal record
European Championship
| Silver medal – second place | 2020 Sweden/Austria/Norway |
| Bronze medal – third place | 2016 Poland |
Mediterranean Games
| Silver medal – second place | 2013 Mersin | Team |
- Updated on 6 July 2024

Marino Marić (born 1 June 1990) is a Croatian professional handball player for TVB Stuttgart and the Croatian national team.

He participated at the 2016, 2018 and at the 2020 European Championships.

== Honours ==
Zagreb

- Dukat Premier League: 2009–10, 2010–11, 2011–12, 2012–13, 2013–14
- Croatian Cup: 2010, 2011, 2012, 2013, 2014
- SEHA League: 2012–13
