= Marko Matić =

Croatian handball player (born 1988)

Personal information
- Nationality: Croatian
- Born: 25 January 1988 (age 38) Ljubuški, Federation of Bosnia and Herzegovina
- Height: 2.02 m (6 ft 8 in)

Sport
- Sport: Handball
- Position: Left Back
- Current club: Hapoel Rishon LeZion
- Number: 9

Senior clubs
- Years: Team
- 2005–2012: (Bosnia and Herzegovina) RK Izviđač Ljubuški
- 2012–2014: (Croatia) RK Zagreb
- 2014–2015: (Germany) Mecklenburg Schwerin
- 2015–2016: (North Macedonia) RK Metalurg Skopje
- 2016–2017: (Portugal) FC Porto
- 2017–2018: (Germany) VfL Gummersbach
- 2018–2019: (Israel) Maccabi Rishon LeZion
- 2020–: (Switzerland) GC Amicitia Zürich
National team
- Years: Team
- –: Croatia
Medal record
Mediterranean Games
Silver medal – second place	2013 Mersin	Team

Marko Matić (born 25 January 1988) is a Croatian handball player who plays for Hapoel Rishon LeZion.
