= Jerko Matulić =

Croatian handball player (born 1990)

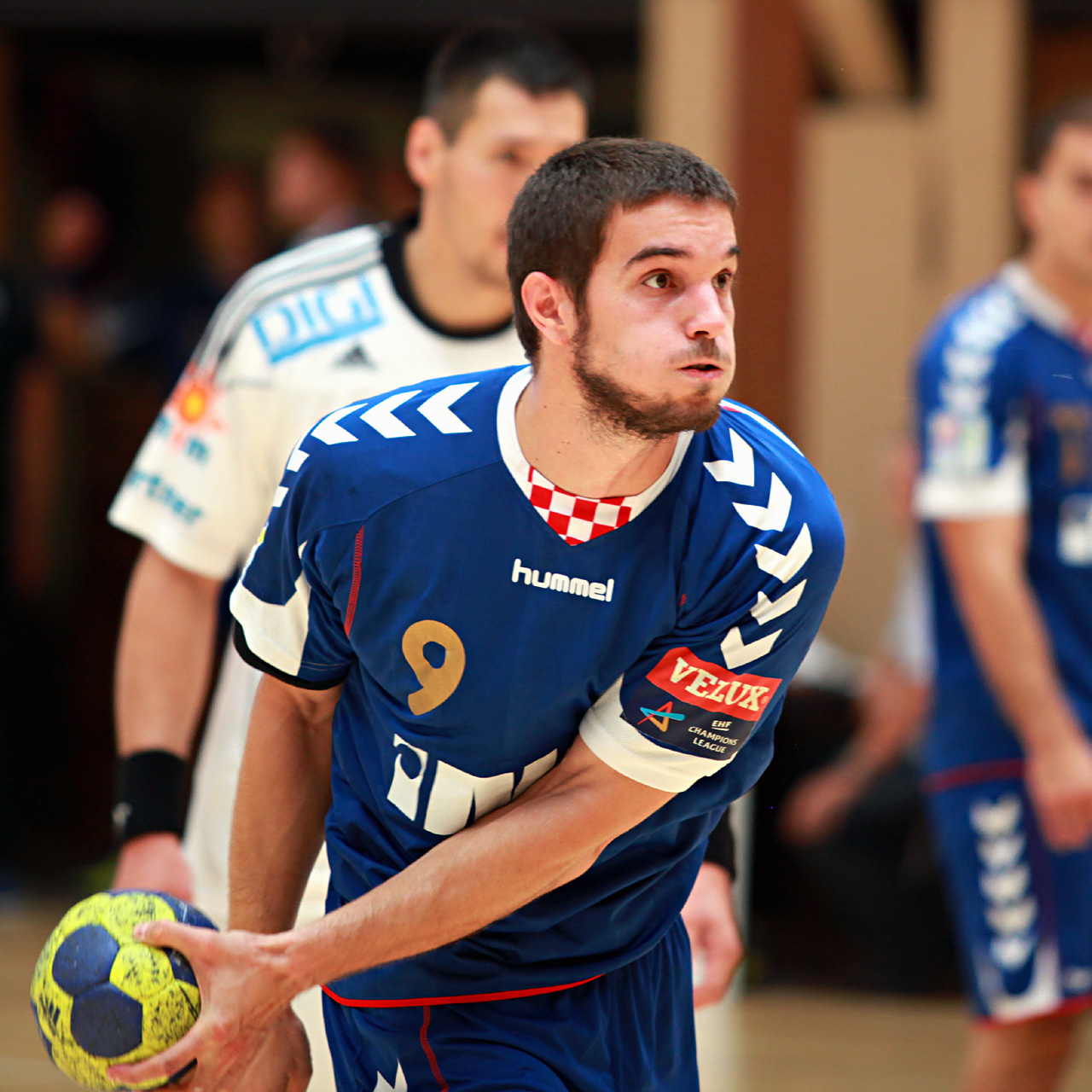

Personal information
- Nationality: Croatian
- Born: 20 April 1990 (age 36) Supetar, Croatia
- Height: 1.87 m (6 ft 2 in)

Sport
- Sport: Handball
- Position: Right wing

Senior clubs
- Years: Team
- 2010–2014: RK Zagreb
- 2014–2016: Chambéry SH
- 2016–2018: HBC Nantes
- 2018–2019: KS Azoty-Puławy
- 2019–2020: Wisła Płock
National team
Years	Team	Apps	(Gls)
2015–	Croatia	35	(59)
Medal record
Mediterranean Games
Silver medal – second place	2013 Mersin	Team
Youth World Championship
Gold medal – first place	2009 Tunisia	Team

Jerko Matulić (born 20 April 1990) is a Croatian handball player.

He participated at the 2017 World Men's Handball Championship.
