= Tina Mihelić =

Croatian sailor (born 1988)

Medal record

Sailing

Representing Croatia

World Championships
Gold medal – first place	2013 Rizhao	Laser Radial

European Championships
Gold medal – first place	2009 Charlotenlund	Laser Radial
Gold medal – first place	2010 Tallinn	Laser Radial
Silver medal – second place	2011 Helsinki	Laser Radial
Silver medal – second place	2014 Split	Laser Radial

Mediterranean Games
Gold medal – first place	2013 Mersin	Women's Laser Radial
Silver medal – second place	2009 Pescara	Women's Laser Radial

Tina Mihelić (born 30 December 1988 in Rijeka) is a Croatian sports sailor. At the 2012 Summer Olympics, she competed in the Women's Laser Radial class, finishing in 17th place. In the same event at the 2016 Olympics, she finished in 13th place.

She was the 2013 World Champion in the same event. She also won the European title in 2010.
