= Montenegro at the 2013 Mediterranean Games =

- IOC code: MNE
- NOC: Montenegrin Olympic Committee

in Mersin
- Competitors: 40 in 12 sports
- Medals Ranked 15th: Gold 1 Silver 1 Bronze 3 Total 5

Mediterranean Games appearances (overview)
- 2009; 2013; 2018; 2022

Other related appearances
- Yugoslavia (1951–1991); Serbia and Montenegro (1997–2005)

Montenegro competed at the 2013 Mediterranean Games in Mersin, Turkey from the 20 to 30 June 2013.

Montenegro was represented by women's handball team and 24 athletes in 11 individual sports.

== Medalists ==
Medal	Name	Sport	Event
Gold	Srđan Mrvaljević	Judo	81 kg
Silver	Miroslav Petković	Bocce	Lyonnaise - precision throw
Bronze	Danijel Furtula	Athletics	Discus throw
Bronze	Nikola Milačić	Boxing	Heavyweight
Bronze	Nikola Gušić	Judo	66 kg

== Archery ==
Montenegro competed in archery.

== Athletics ==
Montenegro competed in athletics.

== Bocce ==
Montenegro competed in bocce.

== Boxing ==
Montenegro competed in boxing.

== Handball ==
Montenegro will be represented by women's team.

- Women's Tournament - 1 team of 16 athletes

== Judo ==
Montenegro competed in judo.

== Karate ==
Montenegro competed in karate.

== Sailing ==
Men

Athlete	Event	Race											Net points	Final rank
Athlete	Event	1	2	3	4	5	6	7	8	9	10	M*	Net points	Final rank
Milivoj Dukić	Laser													
Igor Les	Laser													

== Shooting ==
Montenegro competed in shooting.

== Swimming ==
Montenegro competed in paralympic swimming.

== Tennis ==
Montenegro competed in tennis.

== Wrestling ==
Montenegro competed in wrestling.
