= Leyla Tuifua =

French volleyball player (born 1986)

Personal information
- Nationality: French
- Born: 17 October 1986 (age 40); Mata Utu, Wallis and Futuna
- Height: 178 cm (70 in)
- Weight: 74 kg (163 lb)

Volleyball information
- Position: setter
- Number: 8 (national team)

Career
Years	Teams
2013	Vennelles VB

National team
2013	France

Leyla Tuifua (born 17 October 1986) is a French female former volleyball player, playing as a setter. She was part of the France women's national volleyball team.

She competed at the 2013 Women's European Volleyball Championship. On club level she played for Vennelles VB.
