= Chiara Di Iulio =

Italian volleyball player (born 1985)

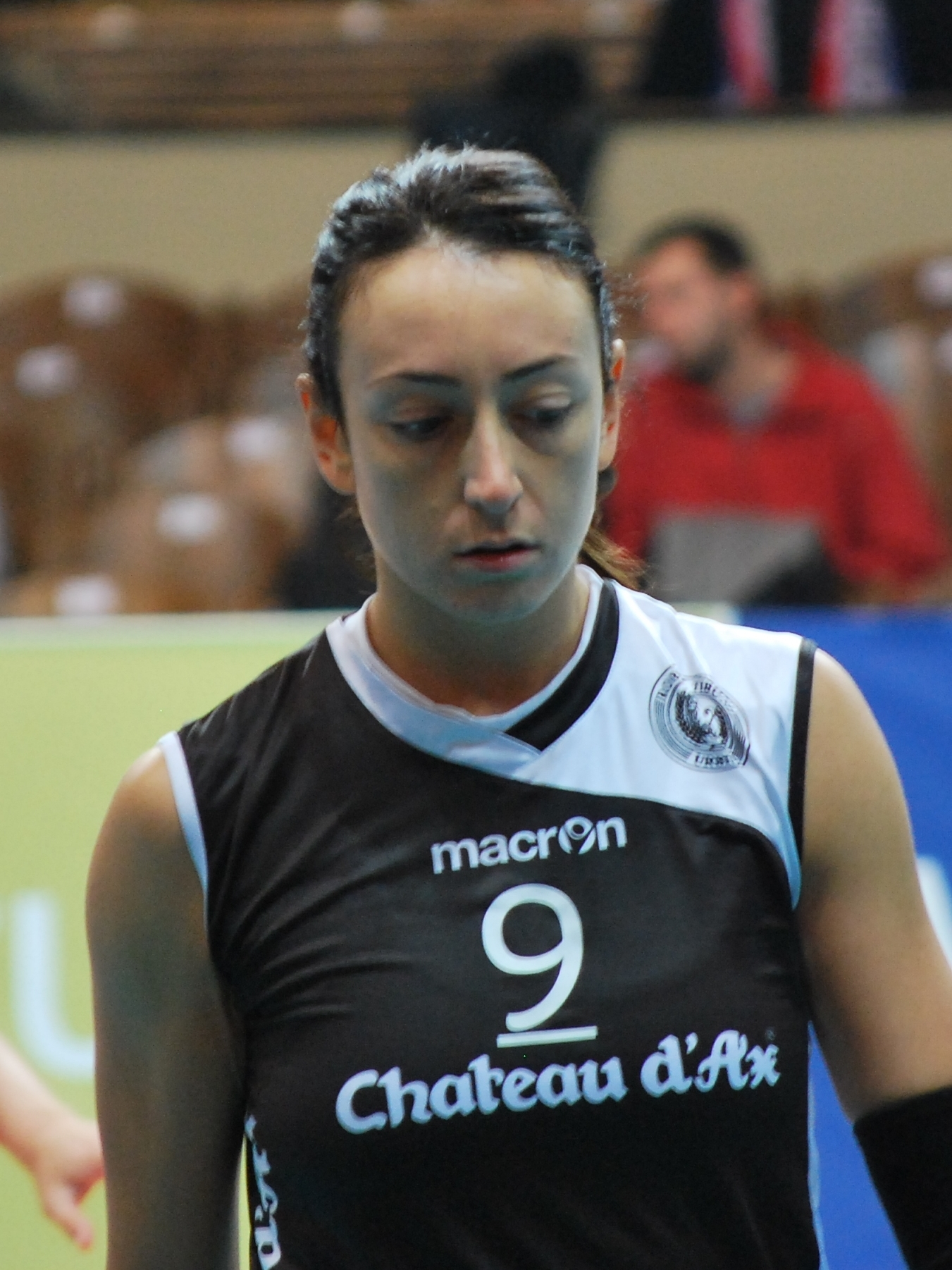
- Di Iulio in 2011

Personal information
- Nationality: Italian
- Born: 5 May 1985 (age 41)
- Height: 1.84 m (6 ft 0 in)
- Weight: 65 kg (143 lb)
- Spike: 291 cm (115 in)
- Block: 278 cm (109 in)

Volleyball information
- Position: outside hitter
- Number: 9

Career
Years	Teams
2010	(Italy) Chateau d'Ax Urbino Volley

National team
2010	Italy

Chiara Di Iulio (born 5 May 1985) is an Italian volleyball player. She was part of the Italy women's national volleyball team at the 2010 FIVB Volleyball Women's World Championship in Japan. and 2011 Montreux Volley Masters. She played with Chateau d'Ax Urbino Volley, at the 2010–11 Women's CEV Cup.

== Clubs ==
- 2003-2006 Colussi Sirio Perugia
- 2006-2007 Scavolini Pesaro
- 2010-2011 (Italy) Chateau d'Ax Urbino Volley
- 2012 (Italy) Volley Bergamo
- 2014 Azeryol Baku
- 2015 Nordmeccanica Piacenza
- 2019 (Turkey) Vakıfbank S.K.
