= Nataša Janković =

Croatian handball player (born 1991)

Personal information
- Nationality: Croatian
- Born: 27 August 1991 (age 35) Zagreb, Croatia
- Height: 1.70 m (5 ft 7 in)

Sport
- Sport: Handball
- Position: Right wing
- Current club: Molde Elite
- Number: 18

Senior clubs
- Years: Team
- 2007–2015: RK Lokomotiva Zagreb
- 2015–2017: Ardeşen GSK
- 2017–2019: Molde Elite
National team
Years	Team	Apps	(Gls)
–	Croatia	23	(19)

Nataša Janković (born 27 August 1991) is a Croatian female handballer for Molde Elite and the Croatian national team.

Janković played in her country for RK Lokomotiva Zagreb (2007–2015) before she moved to Turkey to play for the Rize-based team Ardeşen GSK in the Women's Super League.
