= Bernarda Brčić =

Croatian volleyball player

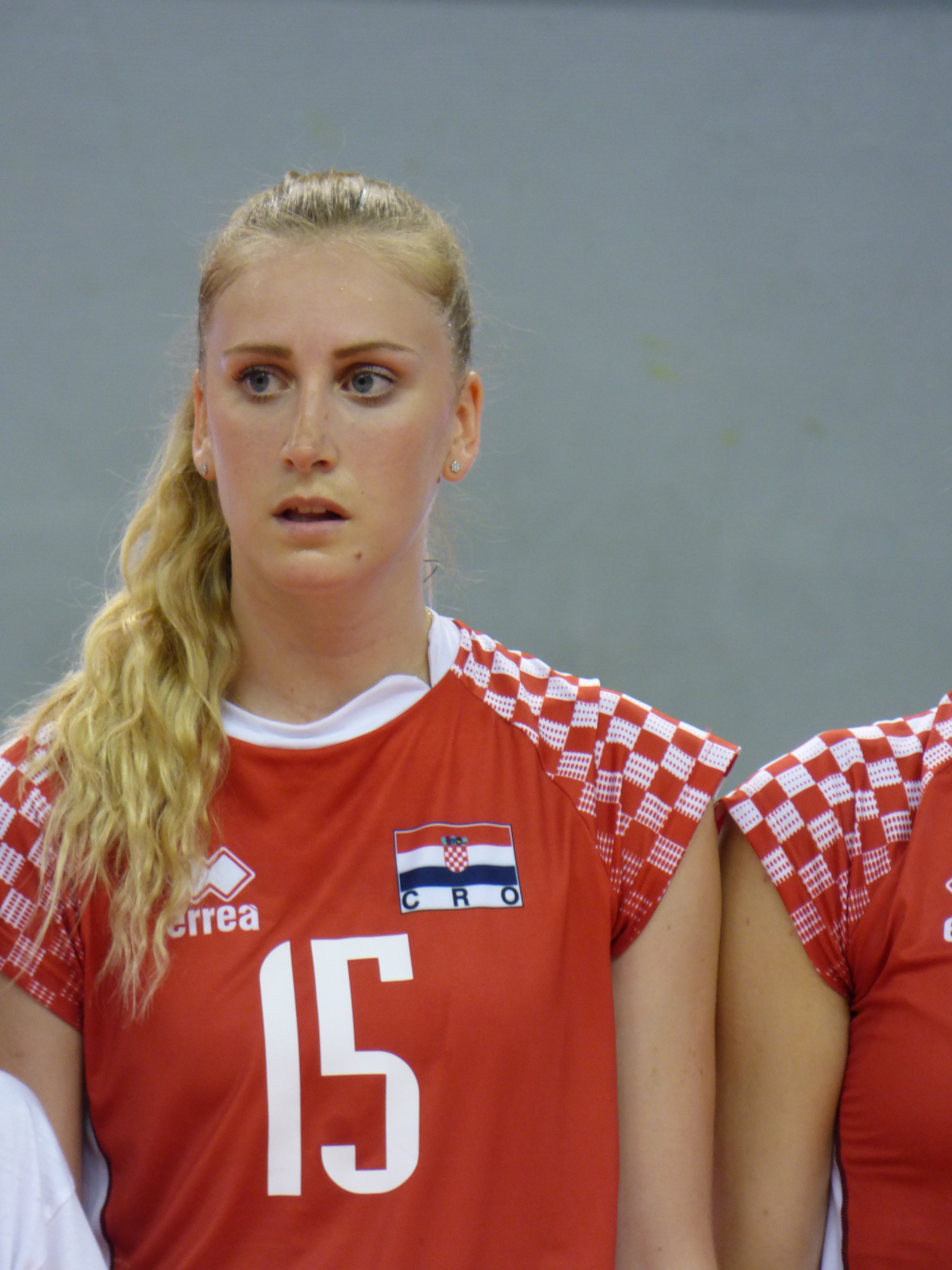
- Brčić playing for Croatia in June 2018.

Personal information
- Nationality: Croatian
- Born: 12 May 1991 (age 35); Osijek, SR Croatia, SFR Yugoslavia
- Height: 1.92 m (6 ft 4 in)
- Weight: 81 kg (179 lb)
- Spike: 305 cm (120 in)
- Block: 297 cm (117 in)

Volleyball information
- Current club: Sm‘Aesch Pfeffingen (Switzerland)

Career
Years	Teams
2009–2013; 2013–2014; 2014–2015; 2015–2016; 2016–2017; 2017; 2017–	ŽOK Rijeka; Tiboni Urbino; ES Le Cannet; Neruda Volley; CSM Târgoviște; OK Kostrena; Calcit Volleyball

National team
2013–	Croatia

Bernarda Brčić (born 12 May 1991) is a Croatian female volleyball player. She is a member of the Croatia women's national volleyball team and plays for RC Cannes since 2020.

She was part of the Croatian national team at the 2014 FIVB Volleyball Women's World Championship in Italy.

== Clubs ==
- (Croatia) ŽOK Rijeka (2009–2013)
- (Italy) Tiboni Urbino (2013–2014)
- (France) ES Le Cannet (2014–2015)
- (Italy) Neruda Volley (2015–2016)
- (Romania) CSM Târgoviște (2016–2017)
- (Croatia) OK Kostrena (2017)
- (Slovenia) Calcit Volleyball (2017–present)
