= Bernarda Ćutuk =

Croatian volleyball player

Personal information
- Nationality: Croatian
- Born: 22 December 1990 (age 35) Zagreb, Croatia
- Height: 1.86 m (6 ft 1 in)
- Weight: 76 kg (168 lb)
- Spike: 317 cm (125 in)
- Block: 300 cm (118 in)

Volleyball information
- Position: Middle blocker
- Current club: SK UP Olomouc

Bernarda Ćutuk (born 22 December 1990) is a Croatian volleyball player. She is a member of the Croatia women's national volleyball team and played for SC Potsdam in 2014.

She was part of the Croatian national team at the 2014 FIVB Volleyball Women's World Championship in Italy.

== Clubs ==
- (Croatia) Mladost Zagreb (2006–2011)
- (Croatia) ŽOK Rijeka (2011–2012)
- (Germany) SC Potsdam (2012–2015)
