= Dragica Džono =

Croatian handball player (born 1987)

Personal information
- Nationality: Croatian
- Born: 24 May 1987 (age 39) Mostar, SR Bosnia and Herzegovina, SFR Yugoslavia
- Height: 1.84 m (6 ft 0 in)

Sport
- Sport: Handball
- Position: Pivot
- Current club: ŽRK Zrinski Čakovec
- Number: 99
National team
Years	Team	Apps	(Gls)
–	Croatia	33	(16)
Medal record
Mediterranean Games
Bronze medal – third place	2013 Mersin	Team

Dragica Džono (born 24 May 1987) is a Croatian handball player for ŽRK Zrinski Čakovec and a former player of the Croatian national team.
