= Laura Partenio =

Italian volleyball player (born 1991)

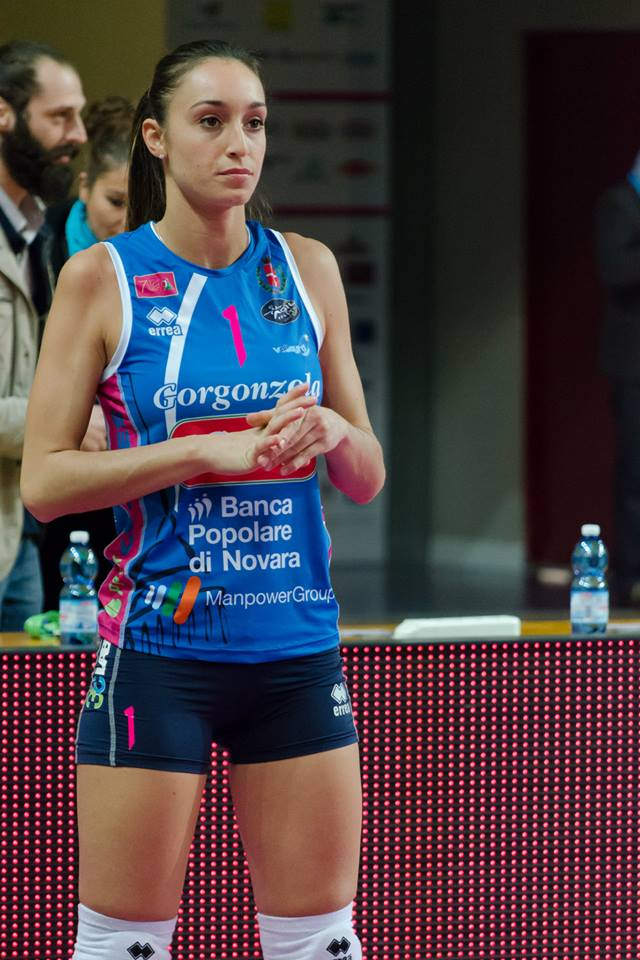

Personal information
- Nationality: Italian
- Born: 29 December 1991 (age 34); Venice, Italy

Volleyball information
- Position: Outside hitter
- Number: 10 (national team)

Career
Years	Teams
2013	(Italy) Tiboni Urbino

National team
2013	Italy

Laura Partenio (born 29 December 1991) is an Italian volleyball player, playing as an outside hitter. She was part of the Italy women's national volleyball team.

She participated at the 2011 Montreux Volley Masters, and 2013 FIVB Volleyball Women's U23 World Championship. She won the gold medal at the 2013 Mediterranean Games. On the club level she played for Tiboni Urbino in 2013.
