= Lana Franković =

Croatian handball player (born 1991)

Personal information
- Nationality: Croatian
- Born: 27 September 1991 (age 35)
- Height: 1.83 m (6 ft 0 in)

Sport
- Sport: Handball
- Position: Left back
- Current club: RK Podravka Vegeta
- Number: 19

Senior clubs
- Years: Team
- –: Rk Đurđevac
- –: Rk Sesvete Agroproteinka
- –: Mosonmagyaróvári KC SE
National team
Years	Team	Apps	(Gls)
–	Croatia	3	(2)
Medal record
Women's handball
Representing Croatia
Mediterranean Games
Bronze medal – third place	2013 Mersin	Team
- Updated on 4 December 2012

Lana Franković (born 27 September 1991) is a Croatian handball player for the Croatian handball club RK Podravka Vegeta and the Croatian national team. In 2013 Franković played in the Mediterranean games in Mersin, Turkey, where Croatia won the bronze medal against Montenegro (25:24).
