= Lucija Mlinar =

Croatian volleyball player (born 1995)

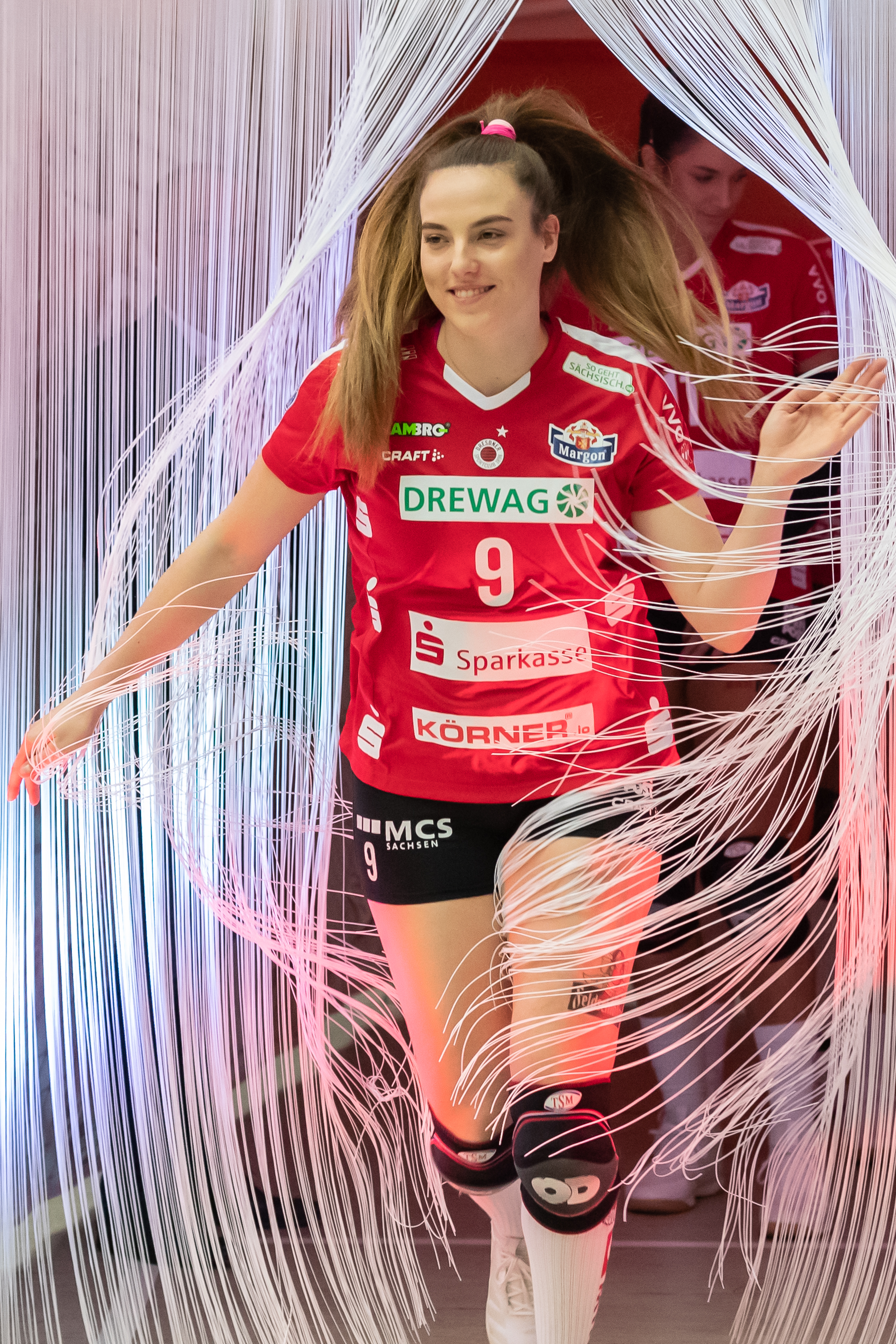

Personal information
- Born: 6 May 1995 (age 31); Zagreb, Croatia
- Height: 1.80 m (5 ft 11 in)
- Weight: 70 kg (150 lb)
- Spike: 295 cm (116 in)
- Block: 280 cm (110 in)

Volleyball information
- Position: Outside hitter

Career
| Years | Teams |
|---|---|
| 2010–2014; 2014–2015; 2015–2016; 2016–2017; 2017–2019; 2019–2020; 2020–2021; 2021–2022; 2022–2023; 2023–2024 | HAOK Mladost; Sm’Aesch Pfeffingen; HAOK Mladost; Dauphines Charleroi; Békéscsabai RSE; Dresdner SC; Bartoccini Fortinfissi Perugia; Çukurova Belediyespor; Edremit Bld. Altınoluk; Energa MKS Kalisz |

National team
| Croatia |
Honours
Women's volleyball
Representing Croatia
FIVB Challenger Cup
| Gold medal – first place | 2022 Zadar |
Mediterranean Games
| Bronze medal – third place | 2013 Mersin |
European League
| Silver medal – second place | 2021 Ruse |
| Silver medal – second place | 2019 Varaždin |

Lucija Mlinar (Mamić) (born 6 May 1995) is a Croatian volleyball player. She last played as outside hitter for Polish club Energa MKS Kalisz.

== International career ==
She is a member of the Croatia women's national volleyball team. She competed at the 2017 FIVB Volleyball World Grand Prix, and 2021 Women's European Volleyball League, winning a silver medal.
