= Floriana Bertone =

Italian volleyball player (born 1992)

Personal information
- Nationality: Italian
- Born: 19 November 1992 (age 33)
- Height: 202 cm (80 in)
- Weight: 80 kg (176 lb)
- Spike: 316 cm (124 in)
- Block: 300 cm (118 in)

Volleyball information
- Number: 18 (national team)

Career
Years	Teams
2014	Il Bisonte San Casciano

National team
2014	Italy

Floriana Bertone (born 19 November 1992) is an Italian female volleyball player. She is part of the Italy women's national volleyball team.

She participated in the 2014 FIVB Volleyball World Grand Prix. On club level she played for Il Bisonte San Casciano in 2014.
