= Iva Jurišić =

Croatian volleyball player

Personal information
- Nationality: Croatian
- Born: 24 March 1994 (age 32)
- Height: 1.86 m (6 ft 1 in)
- Weight: 69 kg (152 lb)
- Spike: 300 cm (120 in)
- Block: 290 cm (110 in)

Volleyball information
- Current club: HAOK Mladost Zagreb

National team
| 2015 | Croatia |

Iva Jurišić (born 24 March 1994) is a Croatian volleyball player. She is a member of the Croatia women's national volleyball team.

== Career ==
She was part of the Croatian national team at the 2015 FIVB World Grand Prix and at the 2016 FIVB World Grand Prix.

On the club level, she played for HAOK Mladost Zagreb.
