= Lauriane Truchetet =

French volleyball player (born 1984)

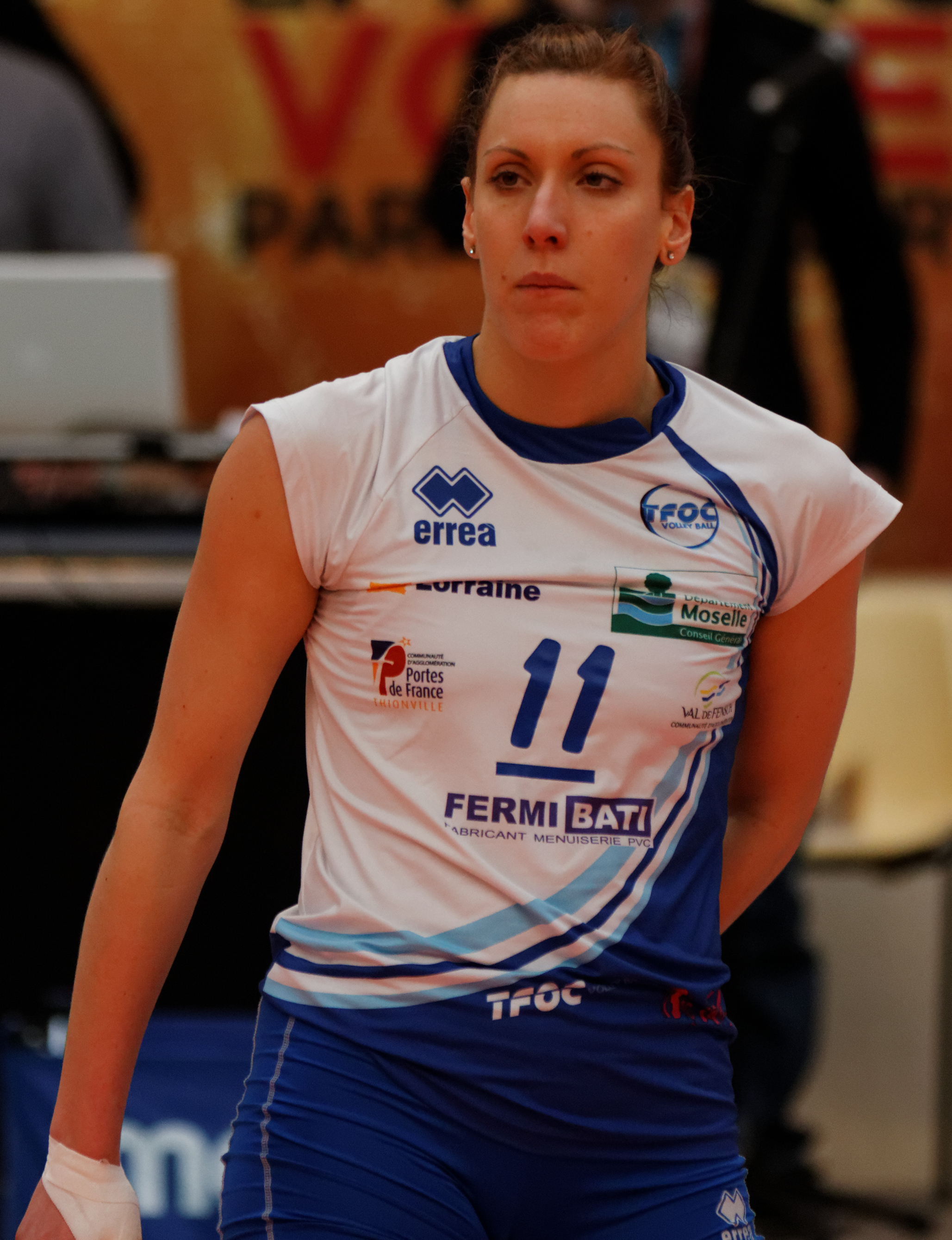

Personal information
- Nationality: French
- Born: 7 April 1984 (age 42); Mulhouse, France

Volleyball information
- Position: setter
- Number: 7 (national team)

Career
Years	Teams
2013	(France) Terville Florange OC

National team
2013	France

Lauriane Truchetet (born 7 April 1984) is a French retired volleyball player, playing as a setter. She was part of the France women's national volleyball team.

She participated in the 2013 Women's European Volleyball Championship. She competed at the 2013 Mediterranean Games. On club level she played for Terville Florange OC in 2013.
