= Handball at the 2013 Mediterranean Games – Men's tournament =

Men's handball at the 2013 Mediterranean Games
Tournament details
- Host country: Turkey
- Venue: 1 (in 1 host city)
- Dates: 23 June – 30 June
- Teams: 10 (from 2 confederations)

Final positions
- Champions: Egypt
- Runners-up: Croatia
- Third place: Turkey
- Fourth place: Italy

Tournament statistics
- Matches played: 27
- Goals scored: 1,439 (53.3 per match)

The men's tournament of handball at the 2013 Mediterranean Games in Mersin, Turkey, were held between June 23 and June 30. All games were held at the Lütfullah Aksungur Sports Hall.

== Format ==
- TEn teams are divided into two preliminary groups. Each group have five teams.
- The top 2 teams from each group will qualify for Semifinals, other teams will qualify for the placement matches.
- Winners of the Semifinals contested the gold medal game and the losers the bronze medal game.

== Participating teams ==
- Algeria
- Croatia
- Egypt
- Greece
- Italy
- North Macedonia
- Slovenia
- Serbia
- Tunisia
- Turkey

== Group stage ==
=== Group A ===
Team	Pld	W	D	L	GF	GA	GD	Pts	TUR	ITA	SRB	MKD	ALG
Turkey	4	3	0	1	113	107	+6	6		34–30	23–24	30–29	26–24
Italy	4	2	0	2	109	100	+9	4	30–34		23–22	33–20	23–24
Serbia	4	2	0	2	112	93	+19	4	29–30	22–23		27–19	34–21
North Macedonia	4	2	0	2	90	109	−19	4	24–23	20–33	19–27		27–26
Algeria	4	1	0	3	95	110	−15	2	24–26	24–23	21–34	26–27	

=== Group B ===
Team	Pld	W	D	L	GF	GA	GD	Pts	CRO	EGY	SLO	TUN	GRE
Croatia	4	3	0	1	120	109	+11	6		28–25	32–34	32–26	28–24
Egypt	4	3	0	1	111	94	+17	6	25–28		33–28	27–22	26–16
Slovenia	4	2	1	1	134	117	+17	5	34–32	28–33		32–32	40–20
Tunisia	4	1	1	2	107	111	−4	3	26–32	22–27	32–32		27–20
Greece	4	0	0	4	80	121	−41	0	24–28	16–26	20–40	20–27	

== Playoffs ==
Semi-finals
29 June
Turkey	22
Egypt	25
29 June
Croatia	23
Italy	21

Final
30 June
Egypt	28
Croatia	23
Third place
30 June
Turkey	32
Italy	26

=== Semifinals ===
June 29; 16:00	Croatia	23–21	Italy	Lütfullah Aksungur Spor Salonu; Referees: Gousko, Repkin (BLR)
June 29; 16:00	Matulić 8	(11-11)	Tokic 7	Lütfullah Aksungur Spor Salonu; Referees: Gousko, Repkin (BLR)

June 29; 18:00	Turkey	22–25	Egypt	Lütfullah Aksungur Spor Salonu; Referees: A.Konjicanin, D.Konjicanin (BIH)
June 29; 18:00	Catkin 6	(11-13)	five players 4	Lütfullah Aksungur Spor Salonu; Referees: A.Konjicanin, D.Konjicanin (BIH)

=== 9th/10th classification ===
June 29; 10:00	Greece	23–27	Algeria	Lütfullah Aksungur Spor Salonu; Referees: Jurinović, Mrvica (CRO)
June 29; 10:00	Palasks 7	(13-11)	Benali 8	Lütfullah Aksungur Spor Salonu; Referees: Jurinović, Mrvica (CRO)

=== 7th/8th classification ===
June 29; 12:00	Tunisia	35–19	North Macedonia	Lütfullah Aksungur Spor Salonu; Referees: Ozdeniz, Erdogan (TUR)
June 29; 12:00	Lazarov, Manaskov 4	(16-10)	Boughanmi 13	Lütfullah Aksungur Spor Salonu; Referees: Ozdeniz, Erdogan (TUR)

=== 5th/6th classification ===
June 29; 14:00	Slovenia	29–26	Serbia	Lütfullah Aksungur Spor Salonu; Referees: Rashed, Elsayed (EGY)
June 29; 14:00	Razgor 8	(12-9)	Marković 7	Lütfullah Aksungur Spor Salonu; Referees: Rashed, Elsayed (EGY)

=== Bronze medal match ===
June 30; 10:00	Turkey	32–26	Italy	Lütfullah Aksungur Spor Salonu; Referees: Jurinović, Mrvcia (CRO)
June 30; 10:00	Done 11	(18-14)	three players 5	Lütfullah Aksungur Spor Salonu; Referees: Jurinović, Mrvcia (CRO)

=== Final ===
June 30; 12:00	Egypt	28–23	Croatia	Lütfullah Aksungur Spor Salonu; Referees: Ozdeniz, Erdogan (TUR)
June 30; 12:00	Eid 7	(14-11)	Matulic 7	Lütfullah Aksungur Spor Salonu; Referees: Ozdeniz, Erdogan (TUR)
