= Volleyball at the 2013 Mediterranean Games – Women's tournament =

Women's Volleyball at the 2013 Mediterranean Games

Medalists
gold medal	Italy
silver medal	Turkey
bronze medal	Croatia

The Women's Volleyball tournament at the 2013 Mediterranean Games will be held in Mersin from 22 June to 30 June 2013. Preliminaries were held at Toroslar Sports Hall, while the finals were held at Servet Tazegül Arena.

== Competition Formula ==
The 6 teams were divided into two pools and will play a round-robin tournament.

The top four of the following teams progress to the Semi Finals.

Pool A	Pool B
Greece; Slovenia; Turkey	Croatia; France; Italy

== Preliminary round ==
=== Pool A ===
Pos	Team	Pld	W	L	Pts	SW	SL	SR	SPW	SPL	SPR
1	Turkey	2	2	0	6	6	1	6.000	169	121	1.397
2	Slovenia	2	1	1	3	3	3	1.000	128	134	0.955
3	Greece	2	0	2	0	1	6	0.167	127	169	0.751

Date	Time		Score		Set 1	Set 2	Set 3	Set 4	Set 5	Total	Report
22-Jun	15:30	Slovenia	3–0	Greece	25–13	25–23	25–23			75–59	
24-Jun	18:00	Turkey	3–0	Slovenia	25–17	25–21	25–15			75–53	
26-Jun	18:00	Greece	1–3	Turkey	6–25	25–19	14–25	23–25		68–94	

=== Pool B ===
Pos	Team	Pld	W	L	Pts	SW	SL	SR	SPW	SPL	SPR
1	Italy	2	2	0	6	6	0	MAX	155	108	1.435
2	Croatia	2	1	1	2	3	5	0.600	154	177	0.870
3	France	2	0	2	1	2	6	0.333	155	179	0.866

Date	Time		Score		Set 1	Set 2	Set 3	Set 4	Set 5	Total	Report
22-Jun	18:00	France	2–3	Croatia	25–21	23–25	17–25	25–13	12–15	102–99	
24-Jun	15:30	Croatia	0–3	Italy	15–25	21–25	19–25			55–75	
26-Jun	15:30	Italy	3–0	France	25–12	30–28	25-13			80–40	

== Elimination round ==
=== Championship bracket ===
Semi-finals
June 28
Slovenia	0
Italy	3
June 28
Turkey	3
Croatia	0

Final
June 30
Italy	3
Turkey	1
Third place
June 30
Slovenia	2
Croatia	3

=== Fifth place match ===
Date	Time		Score		Set 1	Set 2	Set 3	Set 4	Set 5	Total	Report
28-Jun	12:30	Greece	3–1	France	28–26	21–25	25–20	25–23		99–94	

=== Semifinals ===
Date	Time		Score		Set 1	Set 2	Set 3	Set 4	Set 5	Total	Report
28-Jun	15:00	Slovenia	0–3	Italy	14–25	17–25	13–25			44–75	
28-Jun	18:00	Turkey	3–0	Croatia	25–14	25–16	25–14			75–44	

=== Bronze medal match ===
Date	Time		Score		Set 1	Set 2	Set 3	Set 4	Set 5	Total	Report
30-Jun	11:30	Slovenia	2–3	Croatia	25–19	22–25	22–25	25–14	13–15	107–98	

=== Gold medal match ===
Date	Time		Score		Set 1	Set 2	Set 3	Set 4	Set 5	Total	Report
30-Jun	14:00	Italy	3–1	Turkey	23–25	25–22	25–23	25–21		98–91	

== Final standings ==
Rank	Team	W-L Record
1st place, gold medalist(s)	Italy	4–0
2nd place, silver medalist(s)	Turkey	3–1
3rd place, bronze medalist(s)	Croatia	2–2
4th	Slovenia	1–3
5th	Greece	1–2
6th	France	0–3
