= Croatia women's national volleyball team =

Women's national volleyball team representing Croatia

Croatia
- Association: Croatian Volleyball Federation
- Confederation: CEV
- Head coach: Ferhat Akbaş
- FIVB ranking: 32 ▲4 (24 May 2026)

Uniforms
| Home | Away |

Summer Olympics
- Appearances: 1 (First in 2000)
- Best result: 7th (2000)

World Championship
- Appearances: 3 (First in 1998)
- Best result: 6th (1998)

World Cup
- Appearances: 2 (First in 1995)
- Best result: 4th (1995)

European Championship
- Appearances: 16 (First in 1993)
- Best result: (silver) (1995, 1997, 1999)
- hos-cvf.hr (in Croatian)
Honours
Challenger Cup
| Gold medal – first place | 2022 Zadar | Team |
European Championship
| Silver medal – second place | 1995 Netherlands |
| Silver medal – second place | 1997 Czech Republic |
| Silver medal – second place | 1999 Italy |
European League
| Silver medal – second place | 2019 Varaždin |
| Silver medal – second place | 2021 Ruse |
| Bronze medal – third place | 2022 Europe |
Mediterranean Games
| Gold medal – first place | 1993 Languedoc-Roussillon |
| Bronze medal – third place | 2009 Pescara | Team |
| Bronze medal – third place | 2013 Mersin | Team |
| Gold medal – first place | 2018 Tarragona | Team |

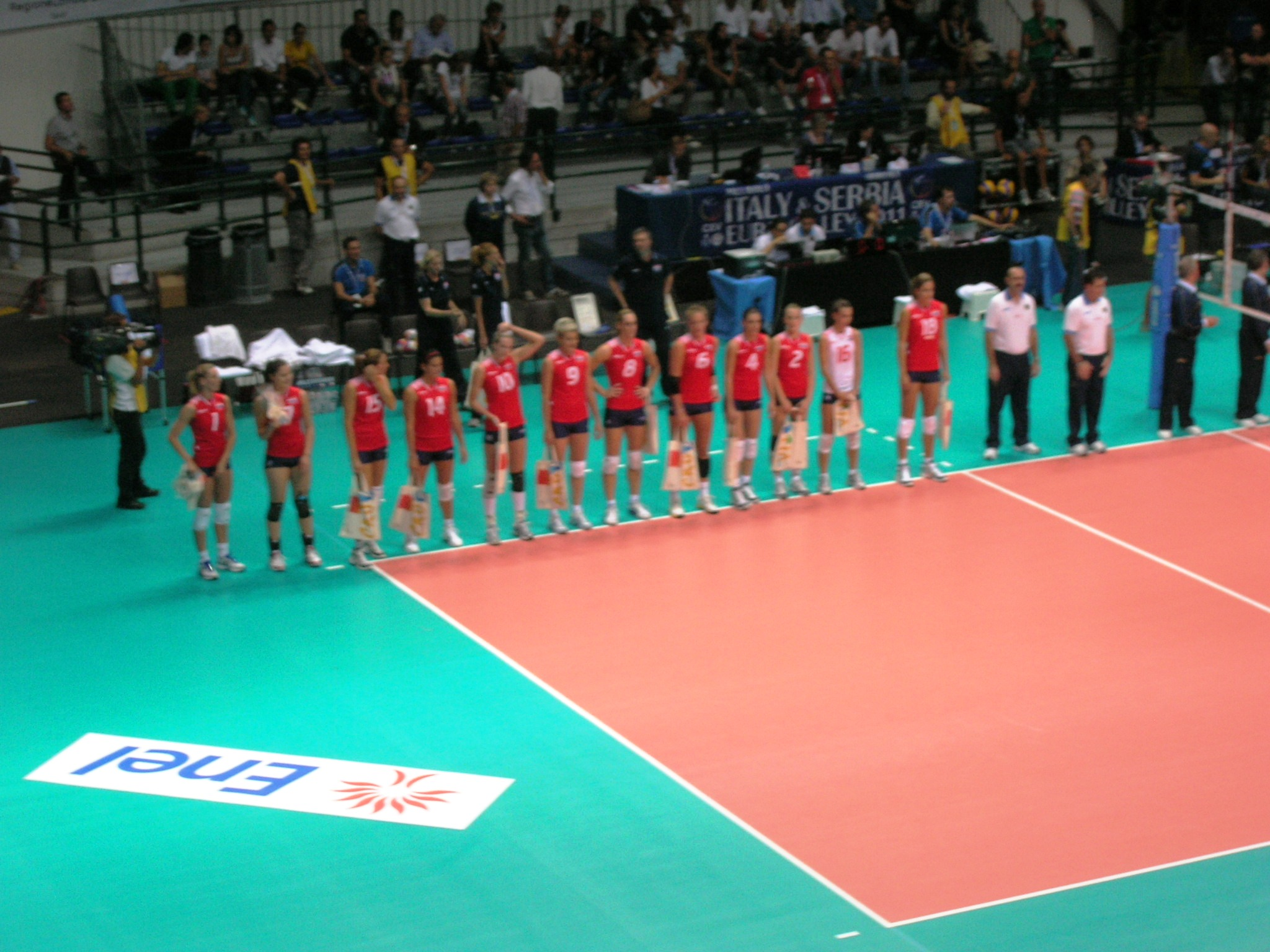
Croatia women's national volleyball team of 2011

The Croatia women's national volleyball team represents Croatia in international women's volleyball competitions and friendly matches. The team's biggest successes came in 1995, 1997 and 1999 when Croatia won three silver medals at the European Championships.

== Tournament record ==
Prior to 1992 Croatia women's national volleyball team competed as a part of Yugoslavia women's national volleyball team.

=== Summer Olympics ===
| Year | Round | Position | Pld | W | L | SW | SL | Squad |
Summer Olympics record
| (Spain) 1992 | Couldn't participate in qualification | | | | | | | |
| (United States) 1996 | Did not qualify | | | | | | | |
| (Australia) 2000 | Quarterfinal | 7th | 8 | 4 | 4 | 13 | 16 | Squad |
| (Greece) 2004 | Did not qualify | | | | | | | |
| (China) 2008 | Did not qualify | | | | | | | |
| (United Kingdom) 2012 | Did not qualify | | | | | | | |
| (Brazil) 2016 | Did not qualify | | | | | | | |
| (Japan) 2020 | Did not qualify | | | | | | | |
| (France) 2024 | Did not qualify | | | | | | | |
| (United States) 2028 | To be determined | | | | | | | |
| (Australia) 2032 | To be determined | | | | | | | |
| Total | Qualified: 1/8 | | 8 | 4 | 4 | 13 | 16 | — |

=== World Championship ===
| World Championship record | | | | | | | | | Qualification record | | | | |
| Year | Round | Position | Pld | W | L | SW | SL | Squad | Pld | W | L | SW | SL |
| (Brazil) 1994 | Did not qualify | | | | | | | | ? | ? | ? | ? | ? |
| (Japan) 1998 | Second Round | 6th | 8 | 4 | 4 | 16 | 15 | Squad | 3 | 3 | 0 | 9 | 0 |
| (Germany) 2002 | Did not qualify | | | | | | | | 3 | 1 | 2 | 4 | 7 |
| (Japan) 2006 | Did not qualify | | | | | | | | 3 | 0 | 3 | 1 | 9 |
| (Japan) 2010 | First Round | 17th | 5 | 2 | 3 | 6 | 9 | Squad | 6 | 5 | 1 | 16 | 6 |
| (Italy) 2014 | Second Round | 13th | 7 | 4 | 3 | 14 | 15 | Squad | 6 | 6 | 0 | 18 | 4 |
| (Japan) 2018 | Did not qualify | | | | | | | | 5 | 2 | 3 | 9 | 10 |
| (Netherlands) (Poland) 2022 | First Round | 22nd | 5 | 0 | 5 | 2 | 15 | Squad | Reallocation after disqualification of Russia | | | | |
| (Thailand) 2025 | Did not qualify | | | | | | | | 6 | 5 | 1 | 16 | 7 |
| (Canada) 2027 | To be determined | | | | | | | | | | | | |
| (Philippines) 2029 | To be determined | | | | | | | | | | | | |
| Total | Qualified: 4/11 | | 25 | 10 | 15 | 38 | 54 | — | 26 | 17 | 9 | 57 | 36 |

=== World Cup ===
World Cup record
| Year | Position | Pld | W | L | SW | SL | Squad |
|---|---|---|---|---|---|---|---|
| (Japan) 1995 | 4th | 11 | 7 | 4 | 27 | 15 | Squad |
| (Japan) 1999 | 8th | 11 | 4 | 7 | 15 | 24 | Squad |
| (Japan) 2003 | Did not qualify | | | | | | |
| (Japan) 2007 | Did not qualify | | | | | | |
| (Japan) 2011 | Did not qualify | | | | | | |
| (Japan) 2015 | Did not qualify | | | | | | |
| (Japan) 2019 | Did not qualify | | | | | | |
| Total | Qualified: 2/7 | 22 | 11 | 11 | 42 | 39 | — |

=== World Grand Prix ===
World Grand Prix record
| Year | Round | Position | Pld | W | L | SW | SL | Squad |
|---|---|---|---|---|---|---|---|---|
| (Hong Kong) 1993 | Did not qualify | | | | | | | |
| (China) 1994 | Did not qualify | | | | | | | |
| (China) 1995 | Did not qualify | | | | | | | |
| (China) 1996 | Did not qualify | | | | | | | |
| (Japan) 1997 | Did not qualify | | | | | | | |
| (Hong Kong) 1998 | Did not qualify | | | | | | | |
| (China) 1999 | Did not qualify | | | | | | | |
| (Philippines) 2000 | Did not qualify | | | | | | | |
| (Macau) 2001 | Did not qualify | | | | | | | |
| (Hong Kong) 2002 | Did not qualify | | | | | | | |
| (Italy) 2003 | Did not qualify | | | | | | | |
| (Italy) 2004 | Did not qualify | | | | | | | |
| (Japan) 2005 | Did not qualify | | | | | | | |
| (Italy) 2006 | Did not qualify | | | | | | | |
| (China) 2007 | Did not qualify | | | | | | | |
| (Japan) 2008 | Did not qualify | | | | | | | |
| (Japan) 2009 | Did not qualify | | | | | | | |
| (China) 2010 | Did not qualify | | | | | | | |
| (Macau) 2011 | Did not qualify | | | | | | | |
| (China) 2012 | Did not qualify | | | | | | | |
| (Japan) 2013 | Did not qualify | | | | | | | |
| (Japan) 2014 | Semifinal | 23rd | 8 | 5 | 3 | 19 | 11 | Squad |
| (United States) 2015 | Preliminary Round | 20th | 6 | 0 | 6 | 5 | 18 | Squad |
| (Thailand) 2016 | Final | 21st | 8 | 7 | 1 | 22 | 5 | Squad |
| (China) 2017 | Preliminary Round | 23rd | 9 | 1 | 8 | 9 | 26 | Squad |
| Total | Qualified: 4/25 | | 31 | 13 | 18 | 55 | 49 | — |

=== Nations League ===
Nations League record
| Year | Round | Position | Pld | W | L | SW | SL | Squad |
|---|---|---|---|---|---|---|---|---|
| (China) 2018 | Did not qualify | | | | | | | |
| (China) 2019 | Did not qualify | | | | | | | |
| (Italy) 2021 | Did not qualify | | | | | | | |
| (Turkey) 2022 | Did not qualify | | | | | | | |
| (United States) 2023 | Preliminary Round | 15th | 12 | 2 | 10 | 8 | 30 | Squad |
| (Thailand) 2024 | Did not qualify | | | | | | | |
| (Poland) 2025 | Did not qualify | | | | | | | |
| (Macau) 2026 | Did not qualify | | | | | | | |
| Total | Qualified: 1/6 | | 12 | 2 | 10 | 8 | 30 | — |

=== Challenger Cup ===
Challenger Cup record
| Year | Round | Position | Pld | W | L | SW | SL | Squad |
|---|---|---|---|---|---|---|---|---|
| (Peru) 2018 | Did not qualify | | | | | | | |
| (Peru) 2019 | Semifinal | 4th | 4 | 1 | 3 | 4 | 10 | Squad |
| (Croatia) 2022 | Final | 1st place, gold medalist(s) | 3 | 3 | 0 | 9 | 2 | Squad |
| (France) 2023 | Quarterfinal | 7th | 1 | 0 | 1 | 1 | 3 | Squad |
| (Philippines) 2024 | Did not qualify | | | | | | | |
| Total | Competed: 3/5 | | 8 | 4 | 4 | 14 | 15 | — |

=== European Championship ===
| European Championship record | | | | | | | | | | Qualification record | | | | |
| Year | Round | Position | Pld | W | L | SW | SL | Squad | | Pld | W | L | SW | SL |
| (Czech Republic) 1993 | Preliminary Round | 6th | 7 | 4 | 3 | 15 | 11 | Squad | | 6 | 5 | 1 | 15 | 4 |
| (Netherlands) 1995 | Final | 2nd place, silver medalist(s) | 7 | 6 | 1 | 18 | 7 | Squad | | Qualified as 6th from the 1993 Euro | | | | |
| (Czech Republic) 1997 | Final | 2nd place, silver medalist(s) | 7 | 6 | 1 | 18 | 5 | Squad | | Qualified as 2nd from the 1995 Euro | | | | |
| (Italy) 1999 | Final | 2nd place, silver medalist(s) | 5 | 3 | 2 | 9 | 8 | Squad | | 10 | 6 | 4 | 23 | 14 |
| (Bulgaria) 2001 | Preliminary Round | 9th | 5 | 2 | 3 | 7 | 12 | Squad | | Qualified as 2nd from the 1999 Euro | | | | |
| (Turkey) 2003 | Did not qualify | | | | | | | | | 6 | 0 | 6 | 2 | 18 |
| (Croatia) 2005 | Preliminary Round | 8th | 7 | 2 | 5 | 9 | 16 | Squad | | 8 | 6 | 2 | 19 | 8 |
| (Belgium) / (Luxembourg) 2007 | Preliminary Round | 14th | 3 | 0 | 3 | 3 | 9 | Squad | | 6 | 5 | 1 | 17 | 6 |
| (Poland) 2009 | Preliminary Round | 16th | 3 | 0 | 3 | 2 | 9 | Squad | | 8 | 5 | 3 | 18 | 12 |
| (Italy) / (Serbia) 2011 | Preliminary Round | 13th | 3 | 1 | 2 | 4 | 6 | Squad | | 8 | 7 | 1 | 21 | 7 |
| (Germany) / (Switzerland) 2013 | Quarterfinal | 5th | 5 | 3 | 2 | 10 | 8 | Squad | | 6 | 5 | 1 | 16 | 3 |
| (Netherlands) / (Belgium) 2015 | Playoffs | 10th | 4 | 2 | 2 | 6 | 8 | Squad | | Qualified as 5th from the 2013 Euro | | | | |
| (Azerbaijan) / (Georgia (country)) 2017 | Playoffs | 11th | 4 | 1 | 3 | 7 | 10 | Squad | | 6 | 6 | 0 | 18 | 1 |
| (Slovakia) / (Hungary) / (Poland) / (Turkey) 2019 | Round of 16 | 11th | 6 | 3 | 3 | 13 | 11 | Squad | | 6 | 6 | 0 | 18 | 2 |
| (Serbia) / (Bulgaria) / (Croatia) / (Romania) 2021 | Round of 16 | 10th | 6 | 4 | 2 | 14 | 7 | Squad | | Qualified as hosts | | | | |
| (Belgium) / (Italy) / (Estonia) / (Germany) 2023 | Preliminary Round | 22nd | 5 | 0 | 5 | 5 | 15 | Squad | | 6 | 5 | 1 | 16 | 7 |
| (Azerbaijan) / (Czech Republic) / (Sweden) / (Turkey) 2026 | Round of 16 | 14th | 6 | 2 | 4 | 9 | 16 | Squad | | 4 | 3 | 1 | 313 | 227 |
| (Spain) 2028 | To be determined | | | | | | | | | To be determined | | | | |
| Total | Qualified: 15/17 | | 77 | 37 | 40 | 140 | 142 | — | 80 | 59 | 21 | 496 | 235 | |

=== European League ===
European League record
| Year | Round | Position | Pld | W | L | SW | SL | Squad |
|---|---|---|---|---|---|---|---|---|
| (Turkey) 2009 | Did not compete | | | | | | | |
| (Turkey) 2010 | Did not compete | | | | | | | |
| (Turkey) 2011 | League Round | 11th | 12 | 1 | 11 | 7 | 33 | Squad |
| (Czech Republic) 2012 | Did not compete | | | | | | | |
| (Bulgaria) 2013 | Did not compete | | | | | | | |
| (European Union) 2014 | Did not compete | | | | | | | |
| (European Union) 2015 | Did not compete | | | | | | | |
| (European Union) 2016 | Did not compete | | | | | | | |
| (European Union) 2017 | Did not compete | | | | | | | |
| (Hungary) 2018 | League Round | 7th | 6 | 3 | 3 | 12 | 12 | Squad |
| (Croatia) 2019 | Final | 2nd place, silver medalist(s) | 8 | 6 | 2 | 21 | 12 | Squad |
| (Bulgaria) 2021 | Final | 2nd place, silver medalist(s) | 8 | 5 | 3 | 19 | 14 | Squad |
| (European Union) 2022 | Semifinal | 3rd place, bronze medalist(s) | 5 | 3 | 2 | 10 | 8 | Squad |
| (Romania) (Sweden) 2023 | Did not compete | | | | | | | |
| (Czech Republic) 2024 | League Round | 9th | 6 | 2 | 4 | 9 | 13 | Squad |
| (Sweden) 2025 | League Round | 8th | 6 | 2 | 4 | 10 | 14 | Squad |
| 2026 | League Round | 11th | 6 | 3 | 3 | 11 | 9 | Squad |
| Total | Competed: 8/17 | | 57 | 25 | 32 | 99 | 115 | — |
| Total | Top tier (Golden league): 8/8 | | 57 | 25 | 32 | 99 | 115 | — |

=== Mediterranean Games ===
Mediterranean Games record
| Year | Round | Position | Pld | W | L | SW | SL | Squad |
|---|---|---|---|---|---|---|---|---|
| (France) 1993 | Final | 1st place, gold medalist(s) | ? | ? | ? | ? | ? | Squad |
| (Italy) 1997 | Did not compete | | | | | | | |
| (Tunisia) 2001 | First Round | 7th | ? | ? | ? | ? | ? | Squad |
| (Spain) 2005 | Semifinal | 4th | 4 | 1 | 3 | 4 | 9 | Squad |
| (Italy) 2009 | Semifinal | 3rd place, bronze medalist(s) | 5 | 3 | 2 | 10 | 7 | Squad |
| (Turkey) 2013 | Semifinal | 3rd place, bronze medalist(s) | 4 | 2 | 2 | 6 | 10 | Squad |
| (Spain) 2018 | Final | 1st place, gold medalist(s) | 5 | 5 | 0 | 15 | 5 | Squad |
| (Algeria) 2022 | Quarterfinals | 7th | 5 | 2 | 3 | 9 | 11 | Squad |
| Total | Competed: 6/7 | | 23 | 13 | 10 | 44 | 42 | — |

== Team ==
The following is the Croatian roster for the 2023 Women's European Volleyball Championship.

| No. | Name | Date of birth | Height | Position | 2022–23 club |
|---|---|---|---|---|---|
| 1 | Karla Antunović | 27 March 2002 (age 24) | 1.83 m (6 ft 0 in) | Setter | (Croatia) HAOK Mladost |
| 2 | Andrea Mihaljević | 21 February 2003 (age 23) | 1.82 m (6 ft 0 in) | Opposite hitter | (Croatia) HAOK Mladost |
| 3 | Ema Strunjak | 24 September 1999 (age 26) | 1.88 m (6 ft 2 in) | Middle blocker | (Turkey) Beşiktaş JK |
| 4 | Božana Butigan | 19 August 2000 (age 26) | 1.92 m (6 ft 4 in) | Middle blocker | (Italy) Volley Bergamo |
| 6 | Lea Deak | 27 April 2000 (age 26) | 1.77 m (5 ft 10 in) | Setter | (Switzerland) Volero Zürich |
| 9 | Lucija Mlinar | 6 May 1995 (age 31) | 1.80 m (5 ft 11 in) | Outside spiker | (Turkey) Edremit Bld. Altınoluk |
| 10 | Dijana Karatović | 23 July 2003 (age 23) | 1.75 m (5 ft 9 in) | Outside spiker | (Croatia) ŽOK Ribola Kaštela |
| 11 | Nina Strize | 14 November 2003 (age 22) | 1.89 m (6 ft 2 in) | Opposite hitter | (Croatia) ŽOK Ribola Kaštela |
| 12 | Josipa Marković | 25 January 2001 (age 25) | 1.85 m (6 ft 1 in) | Outside spiker | (Croatia) HAOK Mladost |
| 14 | Martina Šamadan | 11 September 1993 (age 33) | 1.93 m (6 ft 4 in) | Middle blocker | (France) Volley-Ball Nantes |
| 15 | Viktoria Ana Trcol | 18 September 2004 (age 21) | 1.86 m (6 ft 1 in) | Middle blocker | (Croatia) ŽOK Rijeka |
| 17 | Tia Kovčo | 31 October 2005 (age 20) | 1.68 m (5 ft 6 in) | Libero | (Croatia) OK Split |
| 19 | Izabela Štimac | 12 November 2000 (age 25) | 1.71 m (5 ft 7 in) | Libero | (Croatia) HAOK Mladost |
| 22 | Mirta Freund | 4 July 2002 (age 24) | 1.92 m (6 ft 4 in) | Middle blocker | (Germany) VC Wiesbaden |
