= Algeria at the 2013 Mediterranean Games =

- IOC code: ALG
- NOC: Algerian Olympic Committee

in Mersin
- Competitors: 171 in 17 sports
- Medals Ranked 10th: Gold 9 Silver 2 Bronze 15 Total 26

Mediterranean Games appearances (overview)
- 1967; 1971; 1975; 1979; 1983; 1987; 1991; 1993; 1997; 2001; 2005; 2009; 2013; 2018; 2022

Algeria competed at the 2013 Mediterranean Games in Mersin, Turkey from the 20th to 30 June 2013.

== Medal summary ==
=== Medal table ===
Medal	Name	Sport	Event	Date
Gold	Kenza Dahmani	Athletics	Women's 10,000 meters	26 June
Gold	Amina Betiche	Athletics	Women's 3000 meters steeplechase	28 June
Gold	Yasmina Omrani	Athletics	Heptathlon	29 June
Gold	Rabah Aboud	Athletics	Men's 5000 meters	29 June
Gold	Mohamed Flissi	Boxing	Men's light flyweight	26 June
Gold	Reda Benbaziz	Boxing	Men's bantamweight	26 June
Gold	Abdelkader Chadi	Boxing	Men's light welterweight	26 June
Gold	Ilyas Abbadi	Boxing	Men's welterweight	26 June
Gold	Abdelhafid Benchabla	Boxing	Men's light heavyweight	26 June
Silver	Souad Ait Salem	Athletics	Women's half marathon	29 June
Silver	Miloud Rahmani	Athletics	Men's 400 meters hurdles	29 June
Bronze	Abdelbasset Hannachi	Cycling	Men's road race	21 June
Bronze	Abderahmane Benamadi	Judo	Men's middleweight (90 kg)	21 June
Bronze	Mohamed Amine Ouadahi	Boxing	Men's lightweight	25 June
Bronze	Souad Ait Salem	Athletics	Women's 10,000 meters	26 June
Bronze	Othman Hadj Lazib	Athletics	Men's 110 meters hurdles	26 June
Bronze	Walid Bidani	Weightlifting	Men's 105 kg snatch	26 June
Bronze	Imad Touil	Athletics	Men's 1500 meters	27 June
Bronze	Baya Rahouli	Athletics	Women's triple jump	28 June
Bronze	Mohamed Boudis	Karate	Men's kumite (67 kg)	28 June
Bronze	Missipsa Hamadimi	Karate	Men's kumite (+84 kg)	28 June
Bronze	Sidahmed Boufateh	Bocce	Men's precision throw	June
Bronze	Lamia Aissioui	Bocce	Women's Raffa singles	June
Bronze	Bilal Zouani	Judo	Men's heavyweight (+100 kg)	June
Bronze	Kaouther Ouallal	Judo	Women's half-heavyweight (78 kg)	June
Bronze	Mouatez Djedaiet	Wrestling	Greco-Roman 60 kg	June

Medals by sport
Sport	1st place, gold medalist(s)	2nd place, silver medalist(s)	3rd place, bronze medalist(s)	Total
Athletics	4	2	4	10
Bocce	0	0	2	2
Boxing	5	0	1	6
Cycling	0	0	1	1
Judo	0	0	3	3
Karate	0	0	2	2
Weightlifting	0	0	1	1
Wrestling	0	0	1	1
Total	9	2	15	26

Medals by date
Day	Date	1st place, gold medalist(s)	2nd place, silver medalist(s)	3rd place, bronze medalist(s)	Total
1	20 June	0	0	0	0
2	21 June	0	0	2	2
3	22 June	0	0	0	0
4	23 June	0	0	0	0
5	24 June	0	0	0	0
6	25 June	0	0	1	1
7	26 June	6	0	3	9
8	27 June	0	0	1	1
9	28 June	1	0	3	4
10	29 June	2	2	0	4
11	30 June	0	0	0	0
Total		9	2	15	26

Medals by gender
Gender	1st place, gold medalist(s)	2nd place, silver medalist(s)	3rd place, bronze medalist(s)	Total
Male	6	1	11	18
Female	3	1	4	8
Total	9	2	15	26

Multiple medalists
Name	Sport	1st place, gold medalist(s)	2nd place, silver medalist(s)	3rd place, bronze medalist(s)	Total
Souad Ait Salem	Athletics	0	1	1	2

== Archery ==
Men

Athlete	Event	Ranking round		Round of 64	Round of 32	Round of 16	Quarterfinals	Semifinals	Final / BM	
Athlete	Event	Score	Seed	Opposition Score	Opposition Score	Opposition Score	Opposition Score	Opposition Score	Opposition Score	Rank
Mounir Megherbi	Individual	597	28	Bonelli (SMR); L 2-6	Did not advance					
Yassin Sadeg	Individual	546	38	Rabaa (LBA); W 6-4	Nespoli (ITA); L 2-6	Did not advance				

Women

Athlete	Event	Ranking round		Round of 32	Round of 16	Quarterfinals	Semifinals	Final / BM	
Athlete	Event	Score	Seed	Opposition Score	Opposition Score	Opposition Score	Opposition Score	Opposition Score	Rank
Amina Rezigue	Individual	570	23	Kamel (EGY); L 0-6	Did not advance				

== Athletics ==
Men
Track & road events

Athlete	Event	Semifinal		Final	
Athlete	Event	Result	Rank	Result	Rank
Mohamed Benferrar	800 m	1:48.53	3 Q	1:47.23	6
Yassine Hathat	800 m	1:47.33	4 q	1:46.26	4
Abderrahmane Anou	1500 m	—N/a		3:36.93	4
Imad Touil	1500 m	—N/a		3:36.71	3rd place, bronze medalist(s)
Rabah Aboud	5000 m	—N/a		13:38.01	1st place, gold medalist(s)
Othman Hadj Lazib	110 m hurdles	14.10	2 q	13.61	3rd place, bronze medalist(s)
Abdelmalik Lahoulou	400 m hurdles	51.56	3 Q	51.09	7
Miloud Rahmani	400 m hurdles	50.83	3 Q	49.34	2nd place, silver medalist(s)
Hichem Bouchicha	3000 m steeplechase	—N/a		8:33.38	7
Abdelmadjed Touil	3000 m steeplechase	—N/a		8:22.62	4
Abdelmalik Lahoulou; Mohamed Benferrar; Yassine Hathat; Miloud Rahmani	4 × 400 m relay	—N/a		3:08.27	4
Ahmed Medjaher	Half marathon	—N/a		1:10:02	5
Slimane Moulay	Half marathon	—N/a		1:11:37	7

Women
Track & road events

Athlete	Event	Semifinal		Final	
Athlete	Event	Result	Rank	Result	Rank
Souheir Bouali	100 m	DNS		Did not advance	
Souheir Bouali	200 m	DNS		Did not advance	
Souad Ait Salem	10000 m	—N/a		33:19.34	3rd place, bronze medalist(s)
Kenza Dahmani	10000 m	—N/a		32:42.47	1st place, gold medalist(s)
Amina Betiche	3000 m steeplechase	—N/a		9:40.71	1st place, gold medalist(s)
Souad Ait Salem	Half marathon	—N/a		1:13:54	2nd place, silver medalist(s)
Kenza Dahmani	Half marathon	—N/a		DNF	

Field events

Athlete	Event	Final	
Athlete	Event	Distance	Position
Baya Rahouli	Triple jump	14.04	3rd place, bronze medalist(s)

Combined events – Heptathlon

Athlete	Event	100H	HJ	SP	200 m	LJ	JT	800 m	Final	Rank
Yasmina Omrani	Result	13.89	1.72	13.66	25.25	5.90	39.58	2:20.55	5802	1st place, gold medalist(s)

Key

- Note–Ranks given for track events are within the athlete's heat only
- Q = Qualified for the next round
- q = Qualified for the next round as a fastest loser or, in field events, by position without achieving the qualifying target
- NR = National record
- N/A = Round not applicable for the event
- Bye = Athlete not required to compete in round

== Basketball ==
=== Men's tournament ===
Team roster

Algeria men's national basketball team – 2013 Mediterranean Games roster
Players
Coaches

Pos.	No.	Name	Age – Date of birth	Height	Club	Ctr.
G	4	Mohamed Zerouali	23 – March 27, 1990	6 ft 3 in (1.91 m)	CSM Constantine	(Algeria)
G	6	Abdelhalim Kaouane	31 – November 29, 1981	5 ft 11 in (1.8 m)	Al-Ahly	(Libya)
PG	7	Abdellah Hamdini	21 – January 11, 1992		GS Pétroliers	(Algeria)
PG	8	Mounir Benzegala	26 – April 7, 1987	5 ft 10 in (1.78 m)	GS Pétroliers	(Algeria)
F	9	Mohamed Harat	23 – June 9, 1990	6 ft 5 in (1.96 m)	FUS de Rabat	(Morocco)
F/C	10	Nabil Saidi	33 – March 13, 1980	6 ft 7 in (2.01 m)	GS Pétroliers	(Algeria)
G/F	11	Abdessalem Dekkiche	27 – February 27, 1986	6 ft 5 in (1.96 m)	GS Pétroliers	(Algeria)
F	13	Hocine Gaham	27 – May 1, 1986	6 ft 4 in (1.93 m)	GS Pétroliers	(Algeria)
F	14	Mehdi Cheriet	26 – April 12, 1987	6 ft 7 in (2.01 m)	Boulazac Basket Dordogne	(France)
C	15	Mohamed Sedik Touati	26 – January 25, 1987	7 ft 1 in (2.16 m)	GS Pétroliers	(Algeria)
		Tarik Oukid	–			(Algeria)
		Ali Mounir Benabdelhak	–			(Algeria)

Head coach

- Bilal Faid

Legend

- Club – describes last
  club before the tournament
- Age – describes age
  on August 6, 2016

Standings

Qualified for the semifinals

Team	Pld	W	L	PF	PA	PD	Pts
Turkey	3	3	0	260	191	+69	6
Macedonia	3	2	1	220	225	-5	5
Egypt	3	1	2	218	239	-21	4
Algeria	3	0	3	228	271	-43	3

Results

June 18
19:30

Report

Turkey	97–68	Algeria
Scoring by quarter: 20–16, 24–16, 30–16, 23–20
Pts: Mahmutoğlu 17; Rebs: Savaş 6 Asts: Ermiş 5		Pts: Harat 25; Rebs: Harat 7 Asts: Kaouane 3

Servet Tazegül Arena, Mersin
Referees: Licina (SRB), Langar (TUN), Mikhaylov (RUS)

June 19
17:15

Report

Algeria	81–89	Macedonia
Scoring by quarter: 26-25, 14-17, 13-22, 28-25
Pts: Harat 27; Rebs: Harat 14; Asts: Kaouane 7		Pts: Kostoski 21; Rebs: Karadžovski 6 Asts: Kostoski 6

Servet Tazegül Arena, Mersin
Referees: Mikhaylov (RUS), Cortes (ESP), Langar (TUN)

June 21
17:45

Report

Egypt	85–79	Algeria
Scoring by quarter: 15–15, 22–12, 19–17, 14–26
Pts: Abdallah 14; Rebs: Marei 12; Asts: Khedr 7		Pts: Cheriet, Gaham 14; Rebs: Cheriet 9 Asts: Kaouane 11

Servet Tazegül Arena, Mersin
Referees: Licina (SRB), Ciulin (ROU), Cortes (ESP)

== Boxing ==
Men

Athlete	Event	Round of 16	Quarterfinals	Semifinals	Final	
Athlete	Event	Opposition Result	Opposition Result	Opposition Result	Opposition Result	Rank
Mohamed Flissi	Light flyweight	—N/a		Cappai (ITA); W 3–0	Pehlivan (TUR); W 3–0	1st place, gold medalist(s)
Fahem Hammachi	Flyweight	—N/a	Daraa (MAR); L 0–3	Did not advance		
Reda Benbaziz	Bantamweight	—N/a	Seddik Lbida (MAR); W 3–0	Topçakan (TUR); W 3–0	Abdelaal (EGY); W 3–0	1st place, gold medalist(s)
Mohamed Amine Ouadahi	Lightweight	BYE	Tekbali (LIB); W 3–0	Aydın (TUR); L 0–3	Did not advance	3rd place, bronze medalist(s)
Abdelkader Chadi	Light welterweight	Shytani (ALB); W 3–0	Aladžić (BIH); W 3–0	Mohamed (EGY); W 2–1	Keleş (TUR); W 3–0	1st place, gold medalist(s)
Ilyas Abbadi	Welterweight	—N/a	Köroğlu (TUR); W 3–0	Di Russo (ITA); W 3–0	Sissocko (ESP); W 3–0	1st place, gold medalist(s)
Abdelmalek Rahou	Middleweight	Haddioui (MAR); L 0–3	Did not advance			
Abdelhafid Benchabla	Light heavyweight	Elemekachari (TUN); W 3–0	Rosciglione (ITA); W 3–0	Yıldırım (TUR); W 3–0	Bouhenia (FRA); W 3–0	1st place, gold medalist(s)
Chouaib Bouloudinats	Heavyweight	Filipi (CRO); L 0–3	Did not advance			
Hamza Beguerni	Super heavyweight	—N/a	Arjaoui (MAR); L 0-3	Did not advance		

== Cycling ==
Athlete	Event	Time	Rank
Adil Barbari	Men's road race	OTL	
Adil Barbari	Men's time trial	34:28.53	7
Nabil Baz	Men's road race	DNF	
Abdelkader Belmoukhtar	Men's road race	OTL	
Abdellah Ben Youcef	Men's road race	3:24:55	46
Hichem Chabane	Men's road race	3:20:24	32
Hichem Chabane	Men's time trial	36:11.51	16
Faycal Hamza	Men's road race	3:20:21	29
Abdelbasat Hanachi	Men's road race	3:20:11	3rd place, bronze medalist(s)
Azzedine Lagab	Men's road race	3:20:56	36

== Handball ==
=== Men's tournament ===
Group play

Team	Pld	W	D	L	GF	GA	GD	Points
Turkey	4	3	0	1	113	107	6	6
Italy	4	2	0	2	109	100	9	4
Serbia	4	2	0	2	112	93	19	4
Macedonia	4	2	0	2	90	109	19	4
Algeria	4	1	0	3	95	110	15	2

23 June 2013; 12:00	Algeria	26–27	Macedonia	Lütfullah Aksungur Sports Hall, Adana
23 June 2013; 12:00		(11–13)		Lütfullah Aksungur Sports Hall, Adana

24 June 2013; 18:00	Algeria	24–23	Italy	Lütfullah Aksungur Sports Hall, Adana
24 June 2013; 18:00		(14–12)		Lütfullah Aksungur Sports Hall, Adana

25 June 2013; 12:00	Algeria	21–34	Serbia	Lütfullah Aksungur Sports Hall, Adana
25 June 2013; 12:00		(12–15)		Lütfullah Aksungur Sports Hall, Adana

27 June 2013; 14:00	Turkey	26–24	Algeria	Lütfullah Aksungur Sports Hall, Adana
27 June 2013; 14:00		(12–11)		Lütfullah Aksungur Sports Hall, Adana

9th/10th classification

June 29; 10:00	Greece	23–27	Algeria	Lütfullah Aksungur Sports Hall, Mersin; Referees: Jurinović, Mrvica (CRO)
June 29; 10:00	Palasks 7	(13-11)	Benali 8	Lütfullah Aksungur Sports Hall, Mersin; Referees: Jurinović, Mrvica (CRO)

=== Women's tournament ===
Group play

Team	Pld	W	D	L	GF	GA	GD	Points
Serbia	4	4	0	0	111	86	25	8
Turkey	4	2	0	2	96	98	-2	4
Montenegro	4	2	0	2	81	88	-7	4
Algeria	4	1	0	3	89	95	-6	2
Italy	4	1	0	3	94	104	-10	2

22 June 2013; 17:00	Turkey	25–23	Algeria	Lütfullah Aksungur Sports Hall, Adana
22 June 2013; 17:00		(14-12)		Lütfullah Aksungur Sports Hall, Adana

23 June 2013; 17:30	Serbia	28–20	Algeria	Lütfullah Aksungur Sports Hall, Adana
23 June 2013; 17:30		(18-8)		Lütfullah Aksungur Sports Hall, Adana

24 June 2013; 13:00	Algeria	19–23	Italy	Lütfullah Aksungur Sports Hall, Adana
24 June 2013; 13:00		(11-13)		Lütfullah Aksungur Sports Hall, Adana

26 June 2013; 11:00	Montenegro	19–27	Algeria	Lütfullah Aksungur Sports Hall, Adana
26 June 2013; 11:00		(11-11)		Lütfullah Aksungur Sports Hall, Adana

9th/10th classification

28 June 2013; 09:00	Algeria	24–27	Macedonia	Lütfullah Aksungur Sports Hall, Adana
28 June 2013; 09:00		(11-12)		Lütfullah Aksungur Sports Hall, Adana

== Judo ==
Athlete	Event	Round of 16	Quarterfinals	Semifinals	Repechage	Final / BM	
Athlete	Event	Opposition Result	Opposition Result	Opposition Result	Opposition Result	Opposition Result	Rank
Lyes Saker	Men's 60 kg	—N/a	Damien (LIB); W 000–000	Moudatir (MAR); L 011–000	Did not advance	Basile (ITA); L 000–001	5
Ahmed Mohamedi	Men's 66 kg	Bye	Czukiewycz (FRA); W 100–000	Uriarte (ESP); L 000–110	Did not advance	Khalfaoui (TUN); L 011–120	6
Youcef Ouhab	Men's 73 kg	Parlati (ITA); L 000–010	Did not advance				
Abderahmane Benamadi	Men's 90 kg	Bye	Darwish (EGY); W 100–000	Facente (ITA); L 000–100	Did not advance	Merheb (LIB); W 001–000	3rd place, bronze medalist(s)
Sabrina Saidi	Women's 48 kg	—N/a	Bye	Moscatt (ITA); L 000–100	Did not advance	Ayari (TUN); L 000–100	5
Djazia Haddad	Women's 52 kg	—N/a	Sejdinović (BIH); W 001–000	Nareks (SLO); L 000–100	Did not advance	Delsalle (FRA); L 000–000	5
Ratiba Tariket	Women's 57 kg	—N/a	Zehir (TUR); L 000–001	Did not advance	Tsolani (GRE); L 001–101	Did not advance	
Kahina Saidi	Women's 70 kg	Bye	Bernabéu (ESP); L 000–100	Did not advance			
Sonia Asselah	Women's +70 kg	Bye	Álvarez (ESP); W 012–001	Did not advance			

== Rowing ==
Athlete	Event	Heats		Repechage		Final	
Athlete	Event	Time	Rank	Time	Rank	Time	Rank
Chaouki Dries	Men's single sculls	7:44.75	3 R	7:38.52	5 FB	7:49.65	7
Sid Ali Boudina	Men's lightweight single sculls	—N/a				7:49.99	6
Kamel Ait Daoud; Mohamed Ryad Garidi	Men's lightweight double sculls	7:10.02	4 R	6:52.93	6 FB	6:56.74	8
Amina Rouba	Women's lightweight single sculls	8:26.65	4 FA	—N/a		8:21.07	4

Qualification Legend: FA=Final A (medal); FB=Final B (non-medal); SA/B=Semifinals A/B; SC/D=Semifinals C/D; R=Repechage

== Sailing ==
Men

Athlete	Event	Race											Net points	Final rank
Athlete	Event	1	2	3	4	5	6	7	8	9	10	M*	Net points	Final rank
Mohamed Bouasria Benquali	Laser	20	20	19	13	17	~~22~~	17	20	20	22	—N/a	168	23
Idris Bouhadda	Laser	23	13	18	19	~~24 OCS~~	19	15	17	21	20	—N/a	165	22

Women

Athlete	Event	Race											Net points	Final rank
Athlete	Event	1	2	3	4	5	6	7	8	9	10	M*	Net points	Final rank
Imene Cherif Sahraoui	Laser Radial													
Lamia Feriel Hammiche	Laser Radial													

== Swimming ==
Men

Athlete	Event	Heat		Final	
Athlete	Event	Time	Rank	Time	Rank
Abdelkader Afane	100 m breaststroke	1:05.40	12	Did not advance	

Women

Athlete	Event	Heat		Final	
Athlete	Event	Time	Rank	Time	Rank
Amel Melih	50 m backstroke	30.97	12	Did not advance	
Souad Cherouati	200 m individual medley	2:23.66	10	Did not advance	

== Volleyball ==
=== Men's tournament ===
Standings

Pos	Team	Pld	W	L	Pts	SW	SL	SR	SPW	SPL	SPR
1	Italy	3	2	1	7	8	2	4.000	255	205	1.244
2	Tunisia	3	2	1	6	6	4	1.500	212	219	0.968
3	Algeria	3	2	1	5	6	5	1.200	240	243	0.988
4	Macedonia	3	0	3	0	1	9	0.111	205	245	0.837

Results

Date	Time		Score		Set 1	Set 2	Set 3	Set 4	Set 5	Total	Report
21-Jun	15:30	Tunisia	3–0	Algeria	25–19	25–22	25–18			75–59	
23-Jun	15:30	Algeria	3–2	Italy	22–25	27–25	17–25	25–20	15–10	106–105	
25-Jun	15:30	Macedonia	0–3	Algeria	19–25	23–25	21–25			63–75	

Fifth place match

Date	Time		Score		Set 1	Set 2	Set 3	Set 4	Set 5	Total	Report
27-Jun	13:00	Egypt	3–0	Algeria	25–14	25–19	25–20			75–53	
