= Football at the 2013 Mediterranean Games =

Men's football tournament at the 2013 Mediterranean Games

Tournament details
- Host country: Turkey
- Dates: 19–27 June
- Teams: 8 (from 2 confederations)
- Venues: 2 (in 2 host cities)

Final positions
- Champions: Morocco (2nd title)
- Runners-up: Turkey
- Third place: Tunisia
- Fourth place: Libya

Tournament statistics
- Matches played: 20
- Goals scored: 74 (3.7 per match)
- Top scorer(s): (Bosnia and Herzegovina) Riad Bajić (Morocco) Hicham Khaloua (5 goals each)

Football at the 2013 Mediterranean Games took place between 19 and 27 June. The tournament was held at the Tevfik Sırrı Gür Stadium, and Tarsus City Stadium. The final was held at the Tevfik Sırrı Gür Stadium on 27 June. Associations affiliated with FIFA were invited to send their men's U-19 national teams. There was no women's tournament on this occasion.

== Participating nations ==
Eight nations applied to compete in men's tournament, four less than at the previous games. At least six nations competing is the requirement for tournament to be held. None of the Asian nations opted to compete.

Men

Federation	Nation
CAF Africa	Libya; Morocco; Tunisia
AFC Asia	None
UEFA Europe	Albania; Bosnia and Herzegovina; Italy; Macedonia; Turkey

== Format ==
- Eight teams were split into 2 preliminary round groups of 4 teams each. The top 2 teams from each group qualify for the main knockout stage, other team qualify for placement matches.
- In the semifinals, the matchups are as follows: A1 vs. B2 and B1 vs. A2
- The winning teams from the semifinals play for the gold medal. The losing teams compete for the bronze medal.

== Preliminary round ==
All times are Eastern European Summer Time (UTC+3).

Qualified for the semifinals

=== Group A ===
Team	Pld	W	D	L	GF	GA	GD	Pts
Morocco	3	3	0	0	7	2	+5	9
Turkey	3	2	0	1	8	4	+4	6
Albania	3	0	1	2	3	6	−3	1
Bosnia and Herzegovina	3	0	1	2	4	10	−6	1

19 June 2013
18:00

Morocco	3–0	Bosnia and Herzegovina
Ennaffati 14'; El Karti 17'; Khaloua 73'	Report

Tevfik Sırrı Gür Stadium, Mersin
Referee: Alain Bieri (Switzerland)

19 June 2013
21:45

Turkey	2–0	Albania
Aydın 10'; Sazdağı 86'	Report

Tevfik Sırrı Gür Stadium, Mersin
Referee: Andrea De Marco (Italy)

21 June 2013
18:00

Albania	2–2	Bosnia and Herzegovina
Turtulli 61'; Rrahmani 73'	Report	Bajić 44', 52'

Tarsus Şehir Stadı, Tarsus
Referee: Baris Simsek (Turkey)

21 June 2013
21:45

Turkey	1–2	Morocco
Yazici 57'	Report	El Karti 11'; El-Neoualy 73' (pen.)

Tarsus Şehir Stadı, Tarsus
Referee: Nikola Popov (Bulgaria)

23 June 2013
18:00

Bosnia and Herzegovina	2–5	Turkey
Bajić 18', 30'	Report	Sazdagi 14'; Unsal 39'; Aydın 43'; Coskun 82'; Cicek 86'

Tevfik Sırrı Gür Stadium, Mersin
Referee: Andrea De Marco (Italy)

23 June 2013
21:45

Morocco	2–1	Albania
Khaloua 33' (pen.); El Hassouni 58'	Report	Gino 47'

Tevfik Sırrı Gür Stadium, Mersin
Referee: Alain Bieri (Switzerland)

=== Group B ===
Team	Pld	W	D	L	GF	GA	GD	Pts
Tunisia	3	2	1	0	6	3	+3	7
Libya	3	1	1	1	5	5	0	4
Italy	3	1	1	1	8	5	+3	4
Macedonia	3	0	1	2	3	9	−6	1

19 June 2013
18:00

Macedonia	2–2	Libya
Imeri 52'; Markoski 66'		Elmangoush 70'; Elhouni 80'

Tarsus Şehir Stadı, Tarsus
Referee: Mete Kalkavan (Turkey)

19 June 2013
21:45

Italy	2–2	Tunisia
Gomez 50'; Cataldi 63'	Report	Mhirsi 49', 87'

Tarsus Şehir Stadı, Tarsus
Referee: Anatoliy Zhabchenko (Ukraine)

21 June 2013
18:00

Italy	5–1	Macedonia
Canotto 47'; Iotti 76'; Gomez 79', 82'; Aveni 90+1'	Report	Markoski 20'

Tevfik Sırrı Gür Stadium, Mersin
Referee: Khalid Ennouni (Morocco)

21 June 2013
21:45

Tunisia	2–1	Libya
Rjaibi 2'; Kablouti 76'		Elmangoush 32'

Tevfik Sırrı Gür Stadium, Mersin
Referee: Stanislav Todorov (Bulgaria)

23 June 2013
18:00

Libya	2–1	Italy
Nasr 19'; Alshadi 71'		Palma 90'

Tevfik Sırrı Gür Stadium, Mersin
Referee: Istvan Kovacs (Romania)

23 June 2013
21:45

Macedonia	0–2	Tunisia
	Report	Mhirsi 40'; Kamarji 75'

Tarsus Şehir Stadı, Tarsus
Referee: Mete Kalkavan (Turkey)

== Classification stage ==
=== Classification 5–8 matches ===
25 June 2013
18:00

Italy	0–3	Bosnia and Herzegovina
	Report	Bajić 61'; Hodzic 75', 90+4'

Tarsus Şehir Stadı, Tarsus
Referee: Baris Simsek (Turkey)

25 June 2013
21:00

Albania	1–2 (a.e.t.)	Macedonia
Kastrati 85' (pen.)	Report	Kostovski 50'; Imeri 96'

Tevfik Sırrı Gür Stadium, Mersin
Referee: Nikola Popov (Bulgaria)

=== Seventh place match ===
June 26, 2013
18:00

Albania	1–3	Italy
Hyseni 82'	Report	Canotto 20'; Bollino 47'; Gomez 54' (pen.)

Tarsus Şehir Stadı, Tarsus
Referee: Khalid Ennouni (Morocco)

=== Fifth place match ===
June 26, 2013
18:00

Macedonia	2–4	Bosnia and Herzegovina
Imeri 50'; Markoski 52'	Report	Jpikic 11'; Maric 54'; Markovic 88'; Hodzic 89'

Tarsus Şehir Stadı, Tarsus
Referee: Istvan Kovacs (Romania)

== Knockout stage ==
Semi-finals
25 June 18:00 – Mersin
Tunisia	0
Turkey	2
25 June 21:00 – Tarsus
Morocco	3
Libya	1

Final
27 June 22:00 – Mersin
Turkey	2 (2)
Morocco (p)	2 (3)
Third place
27 June 18:00 – Mersin
Tunisia	4
Libya	0

=== Semifinals ===
25 June 2013
18:00

Tunisia	0–2	Turkey
	Report	Bardakci 50'; Niyaz 77'

Tevfik Sırrı Gür Stadium, Mersin
Referee: Anatoly Zhabchenko (Ukraine)

25 June 2013
21:00

Morocco	3–1	Libya
Khaloua 10', 72'; Ennaffati 80'	Report	Elhouni 36'

Tarsus Şehir Stadı, Tarsus
Referee: Stanislav Todorov (Bulgaria)

=== Bronze medal match ===
27 June 2013
18:00

Libya	0–4	Tunisia
	Report	Rjaibi 2', 36', 78'; Khalfaoui 90'

Tevfik Sırrı Gür Stadium, Mersin
Referee: Mete Kalkavan (Turkey)

=== Gold medal match ===
27 June 2013
22:00

Morocco	2–2 (a.e.t.)	Turkey
Khaloua 2'; Ennaffati 71'		Bardakci 15'; Coskun 28'
Penalties
Khaloua (penalty scored); Moufaddal (penalty missed); Moussadak (penalty missed); Ennaffati (penalty scored); Hajhouj (penalty scored)	3–2	(penalty missed) Yazıcı; (penalty missed) Aydın; (penalty scored) Bardakcı; (penalty scored) Coskun; (penalty missed) Niyaz

Tevfik Sırrı Gür Stadium, Mersin
Referee: Andrea De Marco (Italy)

== Final standings ==
Pos	Team	Pld	W	D	L	GF	GA	GD	Pts	Final result
1st place, gold medalist(s)	Morocco	5	4	1	0	12	5	+7	13	Gold Medal
2nd place, silver medalist(s)	Turkey (H)	5	3	1	1	12	6	+6	10	Silver Medal
3rd place, bronze medalist(s)	Tunisia	5	3	1	1	10	5	+5	10	Bronze Medal
4	Libya	5	1	1	3	6	12	−6	4	Fourth place
5	Bosnia and Herzegovina	5	2	1	2	11	12	−1	7	5th place match
6	Macedonia	5	1	1	3	7	14	−7	4	5th place match
7	Italy	5	2	1	2	11	9	+2	7	7th place match
8	Albania	5	0	1	4	5	11	−6	1	7th place match

Source: rsssf
(H) Hosts

== Medal Winning Squads ==
Event	Gold	Silver	Bronze
	Morocco (MAR); Badreddine Benachour; Omar Boutayeb; Mohamed Saidi; Hamza Moussadak; Mohammed El Jaaouani; Adam Ennaffati; Adnane El Ouardy; Reda En-Neoualy; Youssef Essaiydy; Mohamed Cheikhi; Walid El Karti; Ayman El Hassouni; El Mehdi Moufaddal; Hamza Mouatamid; Elmehdi Dghoughi; Reda Hajhouj; Mohamed Al Makahasi; Hicham Khaloua	Turkey (TUR); Cantuğ Temel; Ozan Tufan; Abdülkerim Bardakcı; Muhammed Serdar Yazıcı; Süheyl Çetin; Kubilay Aktaş; Kubilay Dursun Sönmez; İbrahim Coşkun; Berk İsmail Ünsal; Recep Niyaz; Okan Aydın; Emre Selen; İsmail Güven; Gökhan Sazdağı; Metin Sevinç; Atabey Çiçek; Sedat Yüce; Haydar Deniz	Tunisia (TUN); Seifedine Lahwel; Rami Haj Selem; Khalim Sassi; Walid Dhaouedi; Idriss Mhirsi; Radhouene Khalfaoui; Rafik Kamarji; Edem Rjaïbi; Mehdi Ben Nsib; Bechir Kablouti; Ayoub Jirtila; Sedik Mejri; Oualid Bouzidi; Zied Ounali; Slimen Kchok; Ahmed Khlil; Achref Mnani; Azer Ghali

== Goalscorers ==
There were 74 goals scored in 20 matches, for an average of 3.7 goals per match.

5 goals

- (Bosnia and Herzegovina) Riad Bajić
- (Morocco) Hicham Khaloua

4 goals

- (Bosnia and Herzegovina) Armin Hodžić
- (Italy) Guido Gómez
- (Tunisia) Edem Rjaïbi

3 goals

- (Morocco) Adam Ennafati
- (North Macedonia) Demir Imeri
- (North Macedonia) Kire Markoski
- (Tunisia) Idriss Mhirsi

2 goals

- (Italy) Luigi Canotto
- (Lebanon) Mohamed Elmangoush
- (Lebanon) Hamdou Elhouni
- (Morocco) Walid El Karti
- (Turkey) Okan Aydın
- (Turkey) Abdülkerim Bardakcı
- (Turkey) Ibrahim Coskun
- (Turkey) Gökhan Sazdağı

1 goal

- (Albania) Marvin Turtulli
- (Albania) Amir Rrahmani
- (Albania) Klodian Gjino
- (Albania) Ilir Kastrati
- (Albania) Klaudio Hyseni
- (Bosnia and Herzegovina) Jozo Jpikic
- (Bosnia and Herzegovina) Mirko Marić
- (Bosnia and Herzegovina) Omar Markovic
- (Italy) Danilo Cataldi
- (Italy) Luca Iotti
- (Italy) Fabio Aveni
- (Italy) Giuseppe Palma
- (Lebanon) Saleh Nasr
- (Lebanon) Rabia Alshadi
- (Morocco) Ayman El Hassouni
- (Morocco) Reda El-Neoualy
- (North Macedonia) Hristijan Kostovski
- (Tunisia) Bechir Kablouti
- (Tunisia) Rafik Kamarji
- (Tunisia) Radhouene Khalfaoui
- (Turkey) Atabey Çiçek
- (Turkey) Recep Niyaz
- (Turkey) Berk İsmail Ünsal
- (Turkey) Muhammed Serdar Yazici
