= Boxing at the 2013 Mediterranean Games – Men's light welterweight =

The men's light welterweight competition of the boxing events at the 2013 Mediterranean Games in Mersin, Turkey, was held between June 21 and 26 at the Tarsus Arena.

Like all Mediterranean Games boxing events, the competition was a straight single-elimination tournament. Both semifinal losers were awarded bronze medals, so no boxers competed again after their first loss.

== Schedule ==
All times are Eastern European Summer Time (UTC+3).

Date	Time	Round
June 21, 2013	19:30	Round of 16
June 22, 2013	19:00	Quarterfinals
June 24, 2013	20:00	Semifinals
June 26, 2013	18:00	Final

== Results ==
=== Bracket ===
Round of 16
Sašo Leskaroski (MKD)	0
Alexandros Tsanikidis (GRE)	3
Fatih Keleş (TUR)	3
Khodor Antar (LIB)	0
Vincenzo Mangiacapre (ITA)	1
Eslam Mohamed (EGY)	2
Abdelkader Chadi (ALG)	3
Kristiani Shytani (ALB)	0

Quarterfinals
Jonathan Alonso (ESP)	0
Alexandros Tsanikidis (GRE)	2
Fatih Keleş (TUR)	3
Hassan Amzile (FRA)	0
Abdelhak Aatakni (MAR)	0
Eslam Mohamed (EGY)	3
Abdelkader Chadi (ALG)	3
Bojan Aladžić (BIH)	0

Semifinals
Alexandros Tsanikidis (GRE)	0
Fatih Keleş (TUR)	3
Eslam Mohamed (EGY)	1
Abdelkader Chadi (ALG)	2

Finals
Fatih Keleş (TUR)	0
Abdelkader Chadi (ALG)	3
