= Boxing at the 2013 Mediterranean Games =

- Location: Mersin, Turkey
- Dates: 21–26 June 2013

The boxing competitions at the 2013 Mediterranean Games in Mersin took place between 21 June and 26 June at the Toroslar Sports Hall. Athletes competed in 10 weight categories. Even though women's boxing has been recently introduced to some multi-sports events, only men's boxing events were held.

80 boxers from eighteen countries participated. All countries won at least one medal except Albania, Cyprus, Lebanon and Syria. Algeria dominated the competition by winning five gold and one bronze medal. Macedonia's Fatlum Zhuta secured first medal for his country at the Mediterranean Games after winning his quarterfinal match on Day 3.

== Medal summary ==
=== Events ===
Event	Gold	Silver	Bronze
Light flyweight	Mohamed Flissi (ALG)	Ferhat Pehlivan (TUR)	Ramy Elawady (EGY)
Light flyweight	Mohamed Flissi (ALG)	Ferhat Pehlivan (TUR)	Manuel Cappai (ITA)
Flyweight	José Kelvin de la Nieve (ESP)	Vincenzo Picardi (ITA)	Erdal İnanlı (TUR)
Flyweight	José Kelvin de la Nieve (ESP)	Vincenzo Picardi (ITA)	Abdelali Daraa (MAR)
Bantamweight	Reda Benbaziz (ALG)	Hesham Abdelaal (EGY)	Elias Friha (FRA)
Bantamweight	Reda Benbaziz (ALG)	Hesham Abdelaal (EGY)	Mehmet Topçakan (TUR)
Lightweight	Sofiane Oumiha (FRA)	Bünyamin Aydın (TUR)	Fabio Introvaia (ITA)
Lightweight	Sofiane Oumiha (FRA)	Bünyamin Aydın (TUR)	Mohamed Amine Ouadahi (ALG)
Light welterweight	Abdelkader Chadi (ALG)	Fatih Keleş (TUR)	Alexandros Tsanikidis (GRE)
Light welterweight	Abdelkader Chadi (ALG)	Fatih Keleş (TUR)	Eslam Mohamed (EGY)
Welterweight	Ilyas Abbadi (ALG)	Youba Sissocko (ESP)	Alfonso Di Russo (ITA)
Welterweight	Ilyas Abbadi (ALG)	Youba Sissocko (ESP)	Mohamed Amine Meskini (TUN)
Middleweight	Adem Kılıççı (TUR)	Hosam Abdin (EGY)	Luca Capuano (ITA)
Middleweight	Adem Kılıççı (TUR)	Hosam Abdin (EGY)	Fatlum Zhuta (MKD)
Light heavyweight	Abdelhafid Benchabla (ALG)	Abdelkader Bouhenia (FRA)	Avni Yıldırım (TUR)
Light heavyweight	Abdelhafid Benchabla (ALG)	Abdelkader Bouhenia (FRA)	Džemal Bošnjak (BIH)
Heavyweight	Fabio Turchi (ITA)	Josip Bepo Filipi (CRO)	Nikola Milačić (MNE)
Heavyweight	Fabio Turchi (ITA)	Josip Bepo Filipi (CRO)	Fotios Arapoglou (GRE)
Super heavyweight	Roberto Cammarelle (ITA)	Ali Eren Demirezen (TUR)	Mohammed Arjaoui (MAR)
Super heavyweight	Roberto Cammarelle (ITA)	Ali Eren Demirezen (TUR)	Madian Ahmed (EGY)

=== Medal table ===
Key:

* Host nation (Turkey)

Rank	Nation	Gold	Silver	Bronze	Total
1	Algeria	5	0	1	6
2	Italy	2	1	4	7
3	Turkey*	1	4	3	8
4	France	1	1	1	3
5	Spain	1	1	0	2
6	Egypt	0	2	3	5
7	Croatia	0	1	0	1
8	Greece	0	0	2	2
8	Morocco	0	0	2	2
10	Bosnia and Herzegovina	0	0	1	1
10	Macedonia	0	0	1	1
10	Montenegro	0	0	1	1
10	Tunisia	0	0	1	1
Totals (13 entries)		10	10	20	40

== Participating nations ==
Eighteen Mediterranean nations have registered for boxing competitions.

- Albania
- Algeria
- Bosnia and Herzegovina
- Croatia
- Cyprus
- Egypt
- France
- Greece
- Italy
- Lebanon
- (North Macedonia) Macedonia
- Montenegro
- Morocco
- Slovenia
- Spain
- Syria
- Tunisia
- Turkey
