= Football at the 2013 Mediterranean Games – Men's team squads =

Below are the squads selected for the football tournament at the 2013 Mediterranean Games hosted in the city of Mersin in Turkey, which took place on 19–27 June 2013.

The teams were national U19 sides.

== Group A ==
=== Bosnia and Herzegovina ===
Head coach:

No.	Pos.	Player	Date of birth (age)	Caps	Club
	GK	Vedran Kjosevski	22 May 1995 (aged 18)		(Bosnia and Herzegovina) Željezničar
	MF	Omar Marković	6 April 1994 (aged 19)		(Norway) Start
	FW	Armin Hodžić	17 November 1994 (aged 18)		(Bosnia and Herzegovina) Željezničar
	MF	Amar Rahmanović	13 May 1994 (aged 19)		(Serbia) Novi Pazar
	FW	Fedor Predragović	8 April 1995 (aged 18)		(Bosnia and Herzegovina) Borac Banja Luka
	FW	Mirko Marić	16 May 1995 (aged 18)		(Bosnia and Herzegovina) Široki Brijeg
	MF	Branimir Odak	21 December 1994 (aged 18)		(Bosnia and Herzegovina) Široki Brijeg
	DF	Ante Petrović	31 May 1995 (aged 18)		(Bosnia and Herzegovina) Široki Brijeg
	DF	Jozo Špikić	31 March 1994 (aged 19)		(Bosnia and Herzegovina) Široki Brijeg
	MF	Haris Hajradinović	18 February 1994 (aged 19)		(Croatia) Inter Zaprešić
	GK	Emir Plakalo	19 February 1995 (aged 18)		(Bosnia and Herzegovina) FK Sarajevo
	MF	Damir Sadiković	7 April 1995 (aged 18)		(Bosnia and Herzegovina) Željezničar
	FW	Armin Ćerimagić	14 January 1994 (aged 19)		(Belgium) Eendracht Aalst
	DF	Renato Gojković	10 September 1995 (aged 17)		(Bosnia and Herzegovina) Sloboda Tuzla
	MF	Adin Čiva	15 December 1994 (aged 18)		(Bosnia and Herzegovina) FK Sarajevo
	FW	Almir Kasumović	3 June 1994 (aged 19)		(Germany) Hannover 96
	DF	Haris Muharemović	23 January 1994 (aged 19)		(Bosnia and Herzegovina) FK Sarajevo
	MF	Halil Hajtić	19 January 1994 (aged 19)		(Germany) 1. FC Kaiserslautern

== Group B ==
=== Italy ===
Head coach:

No.	Pos.	Player	Date of birth (age)	Caps	Club
	FW	Fabio Aveni	5 September 1994 (aged 18)		(Italy) Catania
	MF	Simone Battaglia	18 March 1994 (aged 19)		(Italy) Roma
	DF	Davide Biraschi	2 July 1994 (aged 18)		(Italy) Grosseto
	MF	Mauro Bollino	31 December 1994 (aged 18)		(Italy) Palermo
	FW	Luigi Canotto	19 May 1994 (aged 19)		(Italy) Siena
	MF	Eros Castelletto	11 August 1995 (aged 17)		(Italy) Juventus
	MF	Danilo Cataldi	6 August 1994 (aged 18)		(Italy) Lazio
	DF	Daniele Celiento	6 August 1994 (aged 18)		(Italy) Napoli
	GK	Leonardo Citti	14 July 1995 (aged 17)		(Italy) Juventus
	DF	Johad Ferretti	30 May 1994 (aged 19)		(Italy) Milan
	GK	Andrea Fulignati	31 October 1994 (aged 18)		(Italy) Palermo
	FW	Guido Gómez	19 May 1994 (aged 19)		(Italy) Sassuolo
	DF	Luca Iotti	9 November 1995 (aged 17)		(Italy) Milan
	DF	Filippo Minarini	6 March 1994 (aged 19)		(Italy) Modena
	MF	Giuseppe Palma	20 January 1994 (aged 19)		(Italy) Napoli
	MF	Giulio Sanseverino	10 February 1994 (aged 19)		(Italy) Palermo
	DF	Michele Somma	16 March 1995 (aged 18)		(Italy) Roma
	MF	Davide Voltan	15 April 1995 (aged 18)		(Italy) Padova
