= Boxing at the 2013 Mediterranean Games – Men's middleweight =

The men's middleweight competition of the boxing events at the 2013 Mediterranean Games in Mersin, Turkey, was held between June 21 and 26 at the Tarsus Arena.

Like all Mediterranean Games boxing events, the competition was a straight single-elimination tournament. Both semifinal losers were awarded bronze medals, so no boxers competed again after their first loss.

Gold medalist Adem Kılıçcı later served a doping ban related to an offence at the 2012 Summer Olympics. It was reported that "all competitive results of Mr Kilicci obtained from 6 August 2012 until his retirement on 13 December 2016 are disqualified, including forfeiture of medals, points and prizes." No statement on this matter by the International Committee of Mediterranean Games can be found.

== Schedule ==
All times are Eastern European Summer Time (UTC+3).

Date	Time	Round
June 21, 2013	20:30	Round of 16
June 23, 2013	20:00	Quarterfinals
June 24, 2013	20:30	Semifinals
June 26, 2013	20:30	Final

== Results ==
=== Bracket ===
Round of 16
Aljaz Venko (SLO)	0
Luca Capuano (ITA)	3
Abdelmalek Rahou (ALG)	0
Badreddine Haddioui (MAR)	3

Quarterfinals
Kyriakos Spanos (CYP)	0
Luca Capuano (ITA)	3
Adem Kılıççı (TUR)	3
Rachid Hamani (FRA)	0
Fatlum Zhuta (MKD)	2
Najid Salloum (LIB)	1
Badreddine Haddioui (MAR)	3
Hosam Abdin (EGY)	0

Semifinals
Luca Capuano (ITA)	0
Adem Kılıççı (TUR)	3
Fatlum Zhuta (MKD)	0
Badreddine Haddioui (MAR)	3

Finals
Adem Kılıççı (TUR)	3
Badreddine Haddioui (MAR)	0
