= Boxing at the 2013 Mediterranean Games – Men's lightweight =

The men's lightweight competition of the boxing events at the 2013 Mediterranean Games in Mersin, Turkey, was held between June 21 and 26 at the Tarsus Arena.

Like all Mediterranean Games boxing events, the competition was a straight single-elimination tournament. Both semifinal losers were awarded bronze medals, so no boxers competed again after their first loss.

== Schedule ==
All times are Eastern European Summer Time (UTC+3).

Date	Time	Round
June 21, 2013	19:15	Round of 16
June 23, 2013	19:00	Quarterfinals
June 25, 2013	19:30	Semifinals
June 26, 2013	18:00	Final

== Results ==
=== Bracket ===
Round of 16
Gregor Debeljak (SLO)	0
Sofiane Oumiha (FRA)	3

Quarterfinals
Mohamed Eliwa (EGY)	0
Sofiane Oumiha (FRA)	3
Mahdi Ouatine (MAR)	0
Fabio Introvaia (ITA)	3
Bünyamin Aydın (TUR)	2
Ahmed Mejri (TUN)	1
Abdulmalek Tekbali (LIB)	0
Mohamed Amine Ouadahi (ALG)	3

Semifinals
Sofiane Oumiha (FRA)	3
Fabio Introvaia (ITA)	0
Bünyamin Aydın (TUR)	3
Mohamed Amine Ouadahi (ALG)	0

Finals
Sofiane Oumiha (FRA)	2
Bünyamin Aydın (TUR)	1
