= Boxing at the 2013 Mediterranean Games – Men's welterweight =

The men's welterweight competition of the boxing events at the 2013 Mediterranean Games in Mersin, Turkey, was held between June 22 and 26 at the Tarsus Arena.

Like all Mediterranean Games boxing events, the competition was a straight single-elimination tournament. Both semifinal losers were awarded bronze medals, so no boxers competed again after their first loss.

== Schedule ==
All times are Eastern European Summer Time (UTC+3).

Date	Time	Round
June 22, 2013	20:00	Quarterfinals
June 25, 2013	20:00	Semifinals
June 26, 2013	18:00	Final

== Results ==
=== Bracket ===
Quarterfinals
Bojan Risteski (MKD)	0
Alfonso Di Russo (ITA)	3
Abdulkadir Köroğlu (TUR)	0
Ilyas Abbadi (ALG)	3
Ahmad Al Nabouche (LIB)	0
Youba Sissocko (ESP)	3
Mohamed Amine Meskini (TUN)	3
Velibor Vidić (BIH)	0

Semifinals
Alfonso Di Russo (ITA)	0
Ilyas Abbadi (ALG)	3
Youba Sissocko (ESP)	3
Mohamed Amine Meskini (TUN)	0

Finals
Ilyas Abbadi (ALG)	3
Youba Sissocko (ESP)	0
