= Boxing at the 2013 Mediterranean Games – Men's bantamweight =

The men's bantamweight competition of the boxing events at the 2013 Mediterranean Games in Mersin, Turkey, was held between June 21 and 26 at the Tarsus Arena.

Like all Mediterranean Games boxing events, the competition was a straight single-elimination tournament. Both semifinal losers were awarded bronze medals, so no boxers competed again after their first loss.

== Schedule ==
All times are Eastern European Summer Time (UTC+3).

Date	Time	Round
June 21, 2013	18:45	Quarterfinals
June 24, 2013	19:30	Semifinals
June 26, 2013	18:00	Final

== Results ==
=== Bracket ===
Quarterfinals		Semifinals		Finals
		Hesham Abdelaal (EGY)	2
Ciro Cipriano (ITA)	1	Elias Friha (FRA)	1
Elias Friha (FRA)	2			Hesham Abdelaal (EGY)	0
Aboubakr Seddik Lbida (MAR)	0			Reda Benbaziz (ALG)	3
Reda Benbaziz (ALG)	3	Reda Benbaziz (ALG)	3
		Mehmet Topçakan (TUR)	0
