= Boxing at the 2013 Mediterranean Games – Men's super heavyweight =

The men's super heavyweight competition of the boxing events at the 2013 Mediterranean Games in Mersin, Turkey, was held between June 21 and 26 at the Tarsus Arena.

Like all Mediterranean Games boxing events, the competition was a straight single-elimination tournament. Both semifinal losers were awarded bronze medals, so no boxers competed again after their first loss.

== Schedule ==
All times are Eastern European Summer Time (UTC+3).

Date	Time	Round
June 21, 2013	21:30	Quarterfinals
June 25, 2013	21:00	Semifinals
June 26, 2013	21:15	Final

== Results ==
=== Bracket ===
Quarterfinals		Semifinals		Finals
		Ali Eren Demirezen (TUR)	3
Mohammed Arjaoui (MAR)	3	Mohammed Arjaoui (MAR)	0
Hamza Beguerni (ALG)	0			Ali Eren Demirezen (TUR)	0
Alen Beganovic (MNE)	0			Roberto Cammarelle (ITA)	3
Roberto Cammarelle (ITA)	3	Roberto Cammarelle (ITA)	3
		Madian Ahmed (EGY)	0
