= Boxing at the 2013 Mediterranean Games – Men's flyweight =

The men's flyweight competition of the boxing events at the 2013 Mediterranean Games in Mersin, Turkey, was held between June 21 and 26 at the Tarsus Arena.

Like all Mediterranean Games boxing events, the competition was a straight single-elimination tournament. Both semifinal losers were awarded bronze medals, so no boxers competed again after their first loss.

== Schedule ==
All times are Eastern European Summer Time (UTC+3).

Date	Time	Round
June 21, 2013	18:00	Quarterfinals
June 25, 2013	19:00	Semifinals
June 26, 2013	18:00	Final

== Results ==
=== Bracket ===
Quarterfinals		Semifinals		Finals
		Erdal İnanlı (TUR)	0
Elie Konki (FRA)	0	José Kelvin de la Nieve (ESP)	3
José Kelvin de la Nieve (ESP)	3			José Kelvin de la Nieve (ESP)	2
Abdelali Daraa (MAR)	3			Vincenzo Picardi (ITA)	1
Fahem Hammachi (ALG)	0	Abdelali Daraa (MAR)	0
Mahdi Hajri (TUN)	0	Vincenzo Picardi (ITA)	3
Vincenzo Picardi (ITA)	3
