= Wrestling at the 2013 Mediterranean Games =

- Venue: CNR Yenişehir Fair Ground Hall C
- Dates: 22–26 June

The Wrestling competition at the 2013 Mediterranean Games was held in the CNR Yenişehir Fair Ground Hall C in Mersin from June 22 to June 26, 2013.

== Medal table ==
* Host nation (Turkey)

Rank	Nation	Gold	Silver	Bronze	Total
1	Turkey*	14	4	1	19
2	France	3	2	4	9
3	Egypt	1	4	6	11
4	Greece	1	1	5	7
4	Italy	1	1	5	7
6	Tunisia	0	4	3	7
7	Macedonia	0	1	3	4
8	Croatia	0	1	2	3
8	Serbia	0	1	2	3
10	Morocco	0	1	1	2
11	Spain	0	0	2	2
12	Albania	0	0	1	1
12	Algeria	0	0	1	1
Totals (13 entries)		20	20	36	76

== Medalists ==
=== Men's freestyle ===
Event	Gold	Silver	Bronze
55 kg	Zoheir El-Ouarraqe; France	Ibrahim Hafez; Egypt	Theoharis Kalanidis; Greece
55 kg	Zoheir El-Ouarraqe; France	Ibrahim Hafez; Egypt	Ahmet Peker; Turkey
60 kg	Erhan Bakır; Turkey	Hamza Fatah; Morocco	Ibrahim Farag; Egypt
60 kg	Erhan Bakır; Turkey	Hamza Fatah; Morocco	Jasin Redjalari; Macedonia
66 kg	Mustafa Kaya; Turkey	Andreas Triantafyllidis; Greece	Dejan Mitrov; Macedonia
66 kg	Mustafa Kaya; Turkey	Andreas Triantafyllidis; Greece	Ayad Ibrahim; Egypt
74 kg	Soner Demirtaş; Turkey	Abdou Omar; Egypt	Zaur Efendiev; Serbia
74 kg	Soner Demirtaş; Turkey	Abdou Omar; Egypt	Luca Lampis; France
84 kg	Serdar Böke; Turkey	Dejan Bogdanov; Macedonia	Timofei Xenidis; Greece
84 kg	Serdar Böke; Turkey	Dejan Bogdanov; Macedonia	Carmelo Lumia; Italy
96 kg	Rıza Yıldırım; Turkey	Rochdi Rhimi; Tunisia	Stefano Trapani; Italy
96 kg	Rıza Yıldırım; Turkey	Rochdi Rhimi; Tunisia	Egzon Shala; Albania
120 kg	Taha Akgül; Turkey	Slim Trabelsi; Tunisia	Christos Nyfadopoulos; Greece
120 kg	Taha Akgül; Turkey	Slim Trabelsi; Tunisia	Boban Danov; Macedonia

=== Men's Greco-Roman ===
Event	Gold	Silver	Bronze
55 kg	Haithem Mahmoud; Egypt	Fatih Üçüncü; Turkey	Fouad Fajjari; Morocco
55 kg	Haithem Mahmoud; Egypt	Fatih Üçüncü; Turkey	Federico Manea; Italy
60 kg	Mevlüt Arık; Turkey	Tarik Belmadani; France	Mouatez Djedaiet; Algeria
60 kg	Mevlüt Arık; Turkey	Tarik Belmadani; France	Kristijan Fris; Serbia
66 kg	Atakan Yüksel; Turkey	Aleksandar Maksimović; Serbia	Dominik Etlinger; Croatia
66 kg	Atakan Yüksel; Turkey	Aleksandar Maksimović; Serbia	Artak Margaryan; France
74 kg	Emrah Kuş; Turkey	Neven Žugaj; Croatia	Tarek Abdelslam; Egypt
74 kg	Emrah Kuş; Turkey	Neven Žugaj; Croatia	Steeve Guénot; France
84 kg	Selçuk Çebi; Turkey	Samba Diong; France	Haykel Achouri; Tunisia
84 kg	Selçuk Çebi; Turkey	Samba Diong; France	Nenad Žugaj; Croatia
96 kg	Mélonin Noumonvi; France	Cenk İldem; Turkey	Daigoro Timoncini; Italy
96 kg	Mélonin Noumonvi; France	Cenk İldem; Turkey	Ahmed Othman; Egypt
120 kg	Rıza Kayaalp; Turkey	Radhouane Chebbi; Tunisia	Mohamed Abdelfatah; Egypt
120 kg	Rıza Kayaalp; Turkey	Radhouane Chebbi; Tunisia	Rocco Ficara; Italy

=== Women's freestyle ===
Event	Gold	Silver	Bronze
48 kg	Silvia Felice; Italy	Sümeyye Sezer; Turkey	Maroi Mezien; Tunisia
51 kg	Mélanie Lesaffre; France	Burcu Kebiç; Turkey	Evdoxia Pavlidou; Greece
51 kg	Mélanie Lesaffre; France	Burcu Kebiç; Turkey	Mona Samir Mahmoud; Egypt
55 kg	Maria Prevolaraki; Greece	Marwa Amri; Tunisia	Aurélie Basset; France
59 kg	Hafize Şahin; Turkey	Haiat Farag; Egypt	Hela Riabi; Tunisia
63 kg	Elif Jale Yeşilırmak; Turkey	Maria Diana; Italy	Irene García; Spain
63 kg	Elif Jale Yeşilırmak; Turkey	Maria Diana; Italy	Agoro Papavasiliou; Greece
72 kg	Yasemin Adar; Turkey	Nadia Antar; Egypt	Aurora Fajardo; Spain
