= Boxing at the 2013 Mediterranean Games – Men's light heavyweight =

The men's light heavyweight competition of the boxing events at the 2013 Mediterranean Games in Mersin, Turkey, was held between June 21 and 26 at the Tarsus Arena.

Like all Mediterranean Games boxing events, the competition was a straight single-elimination tournament. Both semifinal losers were awarded bronze medals, so no boxers competed again after their first loss.

== Schedule ==
All times are Eastern European Summer Time (UTC+3).

Date	Time	Round
June 21, 2013	21:00	Round of 16
June 23, 2013	21:00	Quarterfinals
June 25, 2013	20:30	Semifinals
June 26, 2013	20:45	Final

== Results ==
=== Bracket ===
Round of 16
Yahia Elemekachari (TUN)	0
Abdelhafid Benchabla (ALG)	3

Quarterfinals
Gianluca Rosciglione (ITA)	0
Abdelhafid Benchabla (ALG)	3
Avni Yıldırım (TUR)	3
Christian Demaj (ALB)	0
Abdelkader Bouhenia (FRA)	2
Abdelrahman Abdelgawad (EGY)	1
Alaa Eloin Ghossoun (SYR)	1
Dzemal Bosnjak (BIH)	2

Semifinals
Avni Yıldırım (TUR)	0
Abdelhafid Benchabla (ALG)	3
Abdelkader Bouhenia (FRA)	3
Dzemal Bosnjak (BIH)	0

Finals
Abdelhafid Benchabla (ALG)	3
Abdelkader Bouhenia (FRA)	0
