= Boxing at the 2013 Mediterranean Games – Men's light flyweight =

The men's light flyweight competition of the boxing events at the 2013 Mediterranean Games in Mersin, Turkey, was held between June 24 and 26 at the Tarsus Arena. Only four boxers were entered meaning that everyone won a medal.

Like all Mediterranean Games boxing events, the competition was a straight single-elimination tournament. Both semifinal losers were awarded bronze medals, so no boxers competed again after their first loss.

== Schedule ==
All times are Eastern European Summer Time (UTC+3).

Date	Time	Round
June 24, 2013	19:00	Semifinals
June 26, 2013	18:00	Final

== Results ==
=== Bracket ===
Semifinals		Finals
Ferhat Pehlivan (TUR)	3
Ramy Elawady (EGY)	0	Ferhat Pehlivan (TUR)	0
Manuel Cappai (ITA)	0	Mohamed Flissi (ALG)	3
Mohamed Flissi (ALG)	3
