= Macedonia at the 2013 Mediterranean Games =

- IOC code: MKD
- NOC: Olympic Committee of North Macedonia

in Mersin, Turkey 20 June 2013 – 30 June 2013
- Competitors: 116 in 19 sports
- Medals Ranked 19th: Gold 0 Silver 1 Bronze 4 Total 5

Mediterranean Games appearances
- 2013; 2018; 2022

Other related appearances
- Yugoslavia (1951–1991)

Macedonia made its debut at the Mediterranean Games in Mersin, Turkey from the 20 to 30 of June 2013.

== Medals ==
Medals by sport
Sport	1st place, gold medalist(s)	2nd place, silver medalist(s)	3rd place, bronze medalist(s)	Total
Wrestling	0	1	3	4
Boxing	0	0	1	1

== Medalists ==
Medal	Name	Sport	Event	Date
Silver	Dejan Bogdanov	Wrestling	Men's Freestyle 84 Kg	
Bronze	Jasin Redjalari	Wrestling	Men's Freestyle 60 Kg	
Bronze	Dejan Mitrov	Wrestling	Men's Freestyle 66 Kg	
Bronze	Boban Danov	Wrestling	Men's Freestyle 120 Kg	
Bronze	Fatlum Zhuta	Boxing	Men's Middleweight	24 June

== Basketball ==
=== Men's tournament ===
Team

- Marko Simonovski
- Darko Sokolov
- Dimitar Karadžovski
- Bojan Krstevski
- Aleksandar Kostoski
- Bojan Trajkovski
- Stojan Gjuroski
- Gorjan Markovski
- Aleksandar Šterjov
- Vladimir Brčkov
- Kristijan Nikolov
- Siniša Avramovski

Standings

Qualified for the semifinals

Team	Pld	W	L	PF	PA	PD	Pts
Turkey	3	3	0	260	191	+69	6
Macedonia	3	2	1	220	225	-5	5
Egypt	3	1	2	218	239	-21	4
Algeria	3	0	3	228	271	-43	3

Results

June 18
17:15

Report

Macedonia	74–67 (OT)	Egypt
Scoring by quarter: 13–20, 12–8, 11–14, 20–14, Overtime: 18–11
Pts: Trajkovski 20; Rebs: Trajkovski 12; Asts: Karadžovski 5		Pts: El-Gammal 16; Rebs: Marei, Abdellah 11; Asts: Abdellah 4

Servet Tazegül Arena, Mersin
Referees: Ciulin (ROU), Tsekov (BUL), Martolini (ITA)

June 19
17:15

Report

Algeria	81–89	Macedonia
Scoring by quarter: 26-25, 14-17, 13-22, 28-25
Pts: Harat 27; Rebs: Harat 14; Asts: Kaouane 7		Pts: Kostoski 21; Rebs: Karadžovski 6 Asts: Kostoski 6

Servet Tazegül Arena, Mersin
Referees: Mikhaylov (RUS), Cortes (ESP), Langar (TUN)

June 21
20:00

Turkey	77–57	Macedonia
Scoring by quarter: 29-18, 15-13, 22-13, 11-13

Servet Tazegül Arena, Mersin

== Football ==
=== Men's tournament ===
Team

- Damjan Shishkovski
- Igor Aleksovski
- Gjoko Zajkov
- Riste Karakamishev
- Filip Ristevski
- Stefan Trajkovikj
- Darko Velkovski
- Mihajlo Mitrov
- Besmir Bojku
- Jordancho Naumoski
- Demir Imeri
- Jasir Asani
- Dorian Babunski
- Kire Markoski
- Kristijan Kostovski
- Dimitar Ivanov

Standings

Team	Pld	W	D	L	GF	GA	GD	Pts
Tunisia	3	2	1	0	6	3	+3	7
Libya	3	1	1	1	5	5	0	4
Italy	3	1	1	1	8	5	+3	4
Macedonia	3	0	1	2	3	9	−6	1

Results

June 19, 2013
18:00

Macedonia	2 – 2	Libya
Imeri 52'; Markoski 66'	Report	Elmangoush 70'; Elhouni 80'

Tarsus Şehir Stadı, Tarsus
Referee: Mete Kalkavan (Turkey)

June 21, 2013
18:00

Italy	5–1	Macedonia
Canotto 47'; Iotti 76'; Gomez 79', 82'; Aveni 90+1'	Report	Markovski 20'

Tevfik Sırrı Gür Stadium, Mersin
Referee: Khalid Ennouni (Morocco)

June 23, 2013
21:45

Macedonia	0–2	Tunisia
	Report	Mhirsi 40'; Kamarji 75'

Tarsus Şehir Stadı, Tarsus
Referee: Mete Kalkavan (Turkey)

== Handball ==
=== Men's tournament ===
1 team of 16 athletes

Preliminary round

Group A
Team	Pld	W	D	L	GF	GA	GD	Pts
Turkey	4	3	0	1	113	107	+6	6
Italy	4	2	0	2	109	100	+9	4
Serbia	4	2	0	2	112	93	+19	4
North Macedonia	4	2	0	2	90	109	−19	4
Algeria	4	1	0	3	95	110	−15	2

=== Women's tournament ===
Preliminary round

Group B
Team	Pld	W	D	L	GF	GA	GD	Pts
Slovenia	4	3	1	0	118	98	+20	7
Croatia	4	2	1	1	108	116	−8	5
Spain	4	2	0	2	93	80	+13	4
Tunisia	4	2	0	2	117	108	+9	4
North Macedonia	4	0	0	4	82	116	−34	0

1 team of 16 athletes

== Swimming ==
Men

Athlete	Event	Heat		Final	
Athlete	Event	Time	Rank	Time	Rank
Marko Blazhevski	400 m freestyle	4:00.53	16	did not advance	
Gorazd Chepishevski	50 m backstroke	28.19	10	did not advance	
Damjan Petrovski	100 m breaststroke	1:06.42	14	did not advance	

== Volleyball ==
=== Men's tournament ===
Standings

Pos	Team	Pld	W	L	Pts	SW	SL	SR	SPW	SPL	SPR
1	Italy	3	2	1	7	8	2	4.000	255	205	1.244
2	Tunisia	3	2	1	6	6	4	1.500	212	219	0.968
3	Algeria	3	2	1	5	6	5	1.200	240	243	0.988
4	Macedonia	3	0	3	0	1	9	0.111	205	245	0.837

Results

Date	Time		Score		Set 1	Set 2	Set 3	Set 4	Set 5	Total	Report
21-Jun	18:00	Italy	3–0	Macedonia	25–18	25–20	25–19			75–57	
23-Jun	13:00	Tunisia	3–1	Macedonia	20–25	25–18	25–23	25–19		95–85	
25-Jun	15:30	Macedonia	0–3	Algeria	19–25	23–25	21–25			63–75	
