= Rowing at the 2013 Mediterranean Games – Women's lightweight single sculls =

The women's lightweight single sculls rowing event at the 2013 Mediterranean Games will be held from June 21–23 at the Seyhan Dam in Adana.

== Schedule ==
All times are Eastern European Summer Time (UTC+3).

Date	Time	Round
June 21, 2013	10:10	Heats
June 23, 2013	10:15	Final A

== Results ==
=== Heat 1 ===
Rank	Rowers	Country	Time	Notes
1	Laura Milani	Italy	7:49.37	FA
2	Aikaterini Nikolaidou	Greece	7:51.02	FA
3	Anna Ioannou	Cyprus	7:54.84	FA
4	Amina Rouba	Algeria	8:26.65	FA
5	Nour Elhouda Taieb	Tunisia	8:41.10	FA

=== Final A ===
Rank	Rowers	Country	Time	Notes
1st place, gold medalist(s)	Aikaterini Nikolaidou	Greece	7:45.71	
2nd place, silver medalist(s)	Laura Milani	Italy	7:49.47	
3rd place, bronze medalist(s)	Anna Ioannou	Cyprus	7:50.41	
4	Amina Rouba	Algeria	8:21.07	
5	Nour Elhouda Taieb	Tunisia	8:37.62	
