= Cyprus at the Mediterranean Games =

- IOC code: CYP
- NOC: Cyprus Olympic Committee
- Medals Ranked 16th: Gold 26 Silver 27 Bronze 30 Total 83

Mediterranean Games appearances (overview)
- 1979; 1983; 1987; 1991; 1993; 1997; 2001; 2005; 2009; 2013; 2018; 2022; 2026

Cyprus first appeared in the quadrennial Mediterranean Games in 1983 and has regularly continued to send athletes to the multi-sport event ever since.

== Overview ==
=== By event ===
Games	Athletes	Gold	Silver	Bronze	Total	Rank
1951–1979	Did not participate					
1983 Casablanca	6	0	0	0	0	—
1987 Latakia	54	2	0	0	2	13th
1991 Athens	79	1	2	1	4	11th
1993 Languedoc-Roussillon	58	0	1	2	3	15th
1997 Bari	50	0	3	4	7	14th
2001 Tunis	66	1	1	3	5	13th
2005 Almería	36	1	4	2	7	14th
2009 Pescara	70	3	4	1	8	12th
2013 Mersin	53	2	2	3	7	14th
2018 Tarragona	118	4	2	2	8	12th
2022 Oran	113	5	2	7	14	13th
2026 Taranto	147	7	6	5	18	11th
Total		26	27	30	83	

== See also ==
- Cyprus at the Olympics
