= 2013 Mediterranean Games medal table =

The 2013 Mediterranean Games medal table is a list of National Olympic Committees (NOCs) ranked by the number of medals won by their athletes during the 2013 Mediterranean Games, held in Mersin, Turkey, from 20 to 30 June 2013.

== Medal table ==
* Host nation (Turkey)

Final medal table, from official website of 2013 Mediterranean Games
Rank	Nation	Gold	Silver	Bronze	Total
1	Italy	70	52	64	186
2	Turkey*	47	43	36	126
3	France	25	26	45	96
4	Spain	21	32	29	82
5	Egypt	21	22	24	67
6	Greece	15	18	26	59
7	Slovenia	13	11	11	35
8	Serbia	12	11	11	34
9	Croatia	11	7	9	27
10	Tunisia	9	17	22	48
11	Algeria	9	2	15	26
12	Morocco	7	10	11	28
13	Albania	3	2	5	10
14	Cyprus	2	2	3	7
15	Montenegro	1	1	3	5
16	Malta	1	1	0	2
17	San Marino	0	2	3	5
18	Syria	0	2	0	2
19	Macedonia	0	1	4	5
20	Bosnia and Herzegovina	0	1	3	4
21	Lebanon	0	0	2	2
22	Andorra	0	0	0	0
22	Libya	0	0	0	0
22	Monaco	0	0	0	0
Totals (24 entries)		267	263	326	856
