= Alexandros Tsanikidis =

Greek boxer

Personal information
- Nationality: Greek
- Born: 28 July 1994 (age 32)
- Height: 1.72 m (5 ft 8 in)
- Weight: 64 kg (141 lb)

Sport
- Country: Greece
- Sport: Boxing
Medal record
Men's amateur boxing
Representing Greece
Mediterranean Games
Bronze medal – third place	2013 Mersin	Light welterweight
Bronze medal – third place	2018 Tarragona	Light welterweight

Alexandros Tsanikidis is a Greek boxer. In 2018, he won a bronze medal at the 2018 Mediterranean Games. Also in 2013, he won a bronze medal at the 2013 Mediterranean Games.
