= Cyprus at the 2005 Mediterranean Games =

- IOC code: CYP
- NOC: Cyprus Olympic Committee

in Almería
- Medals Ranked 14th: Gold 1 Silver 4 Bronze 2 Total 7

Mediterranean Games appearances (overview)
- 1979; 1983; 1987; 1991; 1993; 1997; 2001; 2005; 2009; 2013; 2018; 2022

Cyprus (CYP) competed at the 2005 Mediterranean Games in Almería, Spain with a total number of 36 participants (23 men and 13 women).

== Medals ==
=== Silver ===
Boxing

- Men's Featherweight (– 57 kg): Ovidiu Bobîrnat

== Results by event ==
Boxing

- Men's Featherweight (– 57 kg)
  - Ovidiu Bobîrnat
- Men's Welterweight (– 69 kg)
  - Yury Dabrynski
- Men's Super Heavyweight (+91 kg)
  - Costas Philippou

== See also ==
- Cyprus at the 2004 Summer Olympics
- Cyprus at the 2008 Summer Olympics
