= Cyprus at the 2009 Mediterranean Games =

- IOC code: CYP
- NOC: Cyprus Olympic Committee

in Pescara
- Medals Ranked 12th: Gold 3 Silver 4 Bronze 1 Total 8

Mediterranean Games appearances (overview)
- 1979; 1983; 1987; 1991; 1993; 1997; 2001; 2005; 2009; 2013; 2018; 2022

Cyprus sent a delegation of 69 athletes to the 2009 Mediterranean Games, with the Cypriot team setting a goal of seven medals overall.

Medal	Name	Sport	Event
Gold	Eleni Artymata	Athletics	Women's 200 m
Gold	Anastasia Chrystoforou	Swimming	Women's 50 m breaststroke
Gold	Kyriakos Ioannou	Athletics	Men's high jump
Silver	Georgios Achilleos	Shooting	Skeet
Silver	Dimitris Minasidis	Weightlifting	Men's 62 kg Snatch
Silver	Dimitris Minasidis	Weightlifting	Men's 62 kg Clean & Jerk
Silver	Marianna Zachariadi	Athletics	Women's pole vault
Bronze	Eleni Artymata	Athletics	Women's 100 m
