= Cyprus at the 2001 Mediterranean Games =

- IOC code: CYP
- NOC: Cyprus Olympic Committee

in Tunis
- Competitors: 66
- Medals Ranked 13th: Gold 1 Silver 1 Bronze 3 Total 5

Mediterranean Games appearances (overview)
- 1979; 1983; 1987; 1991; 1993; 1997; 2001; 2005; 2009; 2013; 2018; 2022

Cyprus competed at the 2001 Mediterranean Games held in Tunis, Tunisia.

== Medals by sport ==
Sport	Gold	Silver	Bronze	Total
Athletics	1	0	1	2
Swimming	0	1	1	2
Boxing	0	0	1	1
Totals (3 entries)	1	1	3	5

== List of Medalists ==
Medal	Name	Sport	Event
Gold	Anninos Marcoullides	Athletics	200 m
Silver	Chrysanthos Papachrysanthou	Swimming	50 m Freestyle
Bronze	Anninos Marcoullides	Athletics	100 m
Bronze	Roudik Kazantzian	Boxing	48 kg
Bronze	Maria Papadopoulou	Swimming	100 m Butterfly
