= Cyprus at the 2022 Mediterranean Games =

- IOC code: CYP
- NOC: Cyprus Olympic Committee

in Oran, Algeria 25 June 2022 – 6 July 2022
- Medals Ranked 13th: Gold 5 Silver 2 Bronze 7 Total 14

Mediterranean Games appearances (overview)
- 1979; 1983; 1987; 1991; 1993; 1997; 2001; 2005; 2009; 2013; 2018; 2022

Cyprus competed at the 2022 Mediterranean Games held in Oran, Algeria from 25 June to 6 July 2022.

== Medalists ==
Medal	Name	Sport	Event	Date
Gold	Marios Georgiou	Gymnastics	Men's horizontal bar	29 June
Gold	Milan Trajkovic	Athletics	Men's 110 metres hurdles	
Gold	Apostolos Parellis	Athletics	Men's discus throw	
Gold	Stefanos Nikolaidis	Shooting	Men's skeet	
Gold	Kalia Antoniou	Swimming	Women's 100 metre freestyle	3 July
Silver	Alexandros Poursanidis	Athletics	Men's hammer throw	
Silver	Olivia Fotopoulou	Athletics	Women's 200 metres	
Bronze	Olivia Fotopoulou	Athletics	Women's 100 metres	
Bronze	Marcos Tsangaras	Karate	Men's 67 kg	26 June
Bronze	Eleni Christodoulou; Eva Kattirtzi	Badminton	Women's doubles	27 June
Bronze	Marios Georgiou	Gymnastics	Men's artistic individual all-around	28 June
Bronze	Choiras Charalambos	Wrestling	Men's freestyle 86 kg	28 June
Bronze	Kalia Antoniou	Swimming	Women's 50 metre freestyle	1 July
Bronze	Dafni Georgiou; Marianna Pisiara; Filippa Fotopoulou; Olivia Fotopoulou	Athletics	Women's 4 × 100 metres relay	

== Archery ==
Cyprus competed in archery.

Men

Athlete	Event	Ranking round		Round of 64	Round of 32	Round of 16	Quarterfinals	Semifinals	Final / BM	
Athlete	Event	Score	Seed	Opposition Score	Opposition Score	Opposition Score	Opposition Score	Opposition Score	Opposition Score	Rank
Charalambos Charalambous	Individual	617	20	Bye	Carneiro (POR); L 0–6	Did not advance				
Constantinos Panagi	Individual	617	21	Bye	Bernardi (FRA); L 0–6	Did not advance				
Konstantinos Loizou	Individual	532	33	Forlani (SMR); W 6–2	Gazoz (TUR); L 0–6	Did not advance				
Charalambos Charalambous; Konstantinos Loizou; Constantinos Panagi	Team	1766	8	—	—	Kosovo; W 6–0	Italy; L 0–6	Did not advance		

Women

Athlete	Event	Ranking round		Round of 16	Round of 8	Quarterfinals	Semifinals	Final / BM	
Athlete	Event	Score	Seed	Opposition Score	Opposition Score	Opposition Score	Opposition Score	Opposition Score	Rank
Elena Petrou	Individual	604	17	Maunier (FRA); L 1–7	Did not advance				
Christina Hadjierotocritou	Individual	594	21	Elwalid (TUN); W 6–4	Başaran (TUR); L 2–6	Did not advance			
Mikaella Kourouna	Individual	583	23	Nasoula (GRE); W 6–4	Boari (ITA); L 2–6	Did not advance			
Christina Hadjierotocritou; Mikaella Kourouna; Elena Petrou	Team	1781	7	—	—	Italy; L 0–6	Did not advance		

Mixed

Athlete	Event	Ranking round		Round of 8	Quarterfinals	Semifinals	Final / BM	
Athlete	Event	Score	Seed	Opposition Score	Opposition Score	Opposition Score	Opposition Score	Rank
Elena Petrou; Charalambos Charalambous	Team	1221	8	Egypt (EGY); W 6–0	Turkey (TUR); L 0–6	Did not advance		

== Artistic gymnastics ==
Marios Georgiou won the bronze medal in the men's artistic individual all-around event. He also won the gold medal in the men's horizontal bar event.

== Athletics ==
Cyprus won six medals in athletics.

== Badminton ==
Cyprus won one bronze medal in badminton.

== Boxing ==
Cyprus competed in boxing.

Men

Athlete	Event	Round of 16	Quarterfinals	Semifinals	Final	
Athlete	Event	Opposition Result	Opposition Result	Opposition Result	Opposition Result	Rank
Alexandros Christodoulou	Light Welterweight (63 kg)	Bye	Gianluigi Malanga (ITA); L 0-3	Did not advance		
Rafail Pafios	Welterweight (69 kg)	Stefan Savković (MNE); L 0-3	Did not advance			

== Judo ==
Cyprus competed in judo.

== Karate ==
Cyprus won one medal in karate.

== Shooting ==
Cyprus won one gold medal in shooting.

== Swimming ==
Cyprus won two medals in swimming.

Men

Athlete	Event	Heat		Final	
Athlete	Event	Time	Rank	Time	Rank
Filippos Iakovidis	50 m backstroke	26.55	14	did not advance	
Filippos Iakovidis	100 m backstroke	58.19	17	did not advance	
Markos Iakovidis	50 m freestyle	23.80	17	did not advance	
Markos Iakovidis	50 m breaststroke	29.03	15	did not advance	
Christos Manoli	200 m freestyle	1:58.20	15	did not advance	
Christos Manoli	400 m freestyle	4:09.52	13	did not advance	
Christos Manoli	1500 m freestyle	16:41.18	12	did not advance	
Christos Manoli	100 m butterfly	58.14	18	did not advance	
Christos Manoli	200 m butterfly	2:09.20	11	did not advance	
Sofoklis Mougis	50 m backstroke	26.50	12	did not advance	
Sofoklis Mougis	100 m backstroke	58.01	16	did not advance	
Panayiotis Panaretos	50 m breaststroke	29.01	14	did not advance	
Panayiotis Panaretos	100 m breaststroke	1:03.48	12	did not advance	
Andreas Pantziaros	50 m freestyle	24.88	19	did not advance	
Andreas Pantziaros	100 m freestyle	55.07	19	did not advance	
Andreas Pantziaros; Christos Manoli; Filippos Iakovidis; Markos Iakovidis	4 × 100 m freestyle relay	—		3:32.33	7
Sofoklis Mougis; Panayiotis Panaretos; Christos Manoli; Markos Iakovidis	4 × 100 m medley relay	3:59.81	9	did not advance	

Women

Athlete	Event	Heat		Final	
Athlete	Event	Time	Rank	Time	Rank
Kalia Antoniou	50 m freestyle	25.24	2 Q	25.06	3rd place, bronze medalist(s)
Kalia Antoniou	100 m freestyle	55.11	1 Q	54.36 GR	1st place, gold medalist(s)
Kalia Antoniou	50 m butterfly	27.68	14	did not advance	
Anna Hadjiloizou	50 m freestyle	25.63	6 Q	25.55	6
Anna Hadjiloizou	100 m freestyle	56.57	10	did not advance	

== Taekwondo ==
Cyprus competed in Taekwondo.

Legend

- PTG — Won by Points Gap
- SUP — Won by superiority
- OT — Won on over time (Golden Point)
- DQ — Won by disqualification
- PUN — Won by punitive declaration
- WD — Won by withdrawal

Men

Athlete	Event	Round of 32	Round of 16	Quarterfinals	Semifinals	Final	Rank
Ioannis Pilavakis	68 kg	Bye	Cani (ALB); L 24-26	—	—	—	9

Women

Athlete	Event	Round of 16	Quarterfinals	Semifinals	Final	Rank
Kyriaki Kouttouki	49 kg	Bye	El-Hosseiny (EGY); L 3-12	—	—	5
Markella Teggeri	57 kg	Zeggane (ALG); W 26-6^{PTG}	İlgün (TUR); L 2-22^{PTG}	—	—	5

== Tennis ==
Cyprus competed in tennis.

== Weightlifting ==
Cyprus competed in weightlifting.

Men

Athlete	Event	Snatch		Clean & Jerk	
Athlete	Event	Result	Rank	Result	Rank
Antonis Martasidis	89 kg	150	6	191	4

== Wrestling ==
Cyprus won one medal in wrestling.

Men's freestyle wrestling

Athlete	Event	Round of 16	Quarterfinal	Semifinal	Final / BM	
Athlete	Event	Opposition Result	Opposition Result	Opposition Result	Opposition Result	Rank
Choiras Charalambos	−86 kg	Bye	Erdin (TUR); L 0-10	—	Hajdari (ALB); W 6-1	3rd place, bronze medalist(s)
Alexios Kaouslidis	−125 kg	Sarem (SYR); W 4-0	Hemida (EGY); L 0-11	—	—	7
