= Saleh Nasr =

Egyptian footballer (born 1999)

Personal information
- Date of birth: 7 December 1999 (age 26)
- Place of birth: Cairo, Egypt
- Height: 1.74 m (5 ft 9 in)
- Position: Left winger

Team information
- Current team: Skënderbeu
- Number: 10

Youth career
- 2012–2016: El-Entag El-Harby
- 2016–2020: Al Ahly

Senior career*
Years	Team	Apps	(Gls)
2020–2022	Al Ahly	0	(0)
2020–2021	→ Wadi Degla (loan)	7	(0)
2023–2024	Gandzasar	34	(48)
2024–2025	Teuta	19	(3)
2025–	Skënderbeu	42	(26)
- * Club domestic league appearances and goals as of 23:14, 24 December 2025 (UTC)

Saleh Nasr (Arabic: صالح نصر; born 7 December 1999) is an Egyptian professional footballer who plays as a left-winger for Skënderbeu.

== Career ==
=== Youth career ===
Born in Cairo, Egypt, Nasr began his career in the academy recommended to him by his relative, who played in the youth ranks of Tala'ea El Gaish. He was scouted by former professional player Mohamed Thabet, and joined the academy of one of Thabet's former teams, El-Entag El-Harby, shortly thereafter. Having played against them at youth level, he was brough into the Al Ahly academy after four years with El-Entag El-Harby.

=== Al Ahly ===
After a slow start to his career at Al Ahly, his second season was more productive, and he scored 33 goals in 31 games in the 2017–18 season. He followed this up with 37 goals in 33 games the following year, and was invited to play in a friendly match for the first team, playing ten minutes. As a result of his fine form for Al Ahly's youth teams, Tunisian club ES Sahel made an official offer for him.

In December 2020, Wadi Degla announced the signing of Nasr on a season-long loan. He managed seven league appearances before returning to Al Ahly, with the club disappointed with the lack of games he played, immediately making him available for loan again, with first-team coach Pitso Mosimane requesting that he leave on loan to gain experience. The following year, in September 2022, having failed to find a suitable club to sign Nasr, he was released by Al Ahly.

=== Move to Europe ===
Following his release, he moved to Armenia, signing with Gandzasar. After a successful first season, he scored 32 goals in 21 games the following year, helping his side to the Armenian First League title. He was the third-highest goal-scorer worldwide, behind Harry Kane and Cristiano Ronaldo. Following these exploits, he was signed by Albanian Kategoria Superiore club Teuta in August 2024. However, he was unable to replicate his goal-scoring form, and after 3 goals in 19 league appearances, he left the club in February 2025.

Having joined fellow Kategoria Superiore club Skënderbeu, Nasr scored 7 goals in his first 8 games. Though unable to prevent Skënderbeu from being relegated to the Kategoria e Parë, this form led him to be linked with a move to Egnatia. He ultimately remained with Skënderbeu, and continued his goal-scoring form, which reportedly drew the attention of his former club Al Ahly.

== Style of play ==
Nasr described his best position as left-wing, though he is also comfortable playing as a centre-forward. Growing up he idolised Egyptian midfielder Mohamed Barakat and Portuguese forward Cristiano Ronaldo.

== Personal life ==
In August 2025, while at Skënderbeu, Nasr was attacked by two men, who hit him repeatedly over the head before raping him. The two men were arrested by Korça police, with three others who were present also prosecuted.

== Career statistics ==
=== Club ===
As of 24 December 2025.

Appearances and goals by club, season and competition
Club	Season	League			National Cup (Note: Includes Egypt Cup, Armenian Cup and Albanian Cup)		League Cup (Note: Includes Egyptian League Cup)		Other		Total	
Club	Season	Division	Apps	Goals	Apps	Goals	Apps	Goals	Apps	Goals	Apps	Goals
Al Ahly	2020–21	Egyptian Premier League	0	0	0	0	0	0	0	0	0	0
Al Ahly	2021–22	Egyptian Premier League	0	0	0	0	2	0	0	0	2	0
Al Ahly	Total		0	0	0	0	2	0	0	0	2	0
Wadi Degla (loan)	2020–21	Egyptian Premier League	7	0	1	0	0	0	0	0	8	0
Gandzasar	2022–23	Armenian First League	13	16	1	0	–		0	0	14	16
Gandzasar	2023–24	Armenian First League	21	32	2	1	–		0	0	23	33
Gandzasar	Total		34	48	3	1	0	0	0	0	37	49
Teuta	2024–25	Kategoria Superiore	19	3	1	0	–		0	0	20	3
Skënderbeu	2024–25	Kategoria Superiore	12	8	0	0	–		0	0	12	8
Skënderbeu	2025–26	Kategoria e Parë	16	9	0	0	–		0	0	16	9
Skënderbeu	Total		28	17	0	0	0	0	0	0	28	17
Career total			88	68	5	1	2	0	0	0	95	69
