= Filippo Minarini =

Italian footballer

Personal information
- Date of birth: 6 March 1994 (age 32)
- Place of birth: Modena, Italy
- Height: 1.84 m (6 ft 1/2 in)
- Position: Defender

Senior career*
Years	Team	Apps	(Gls)
2012–2017	Modena	27	(0)
2014–2015	→ Sassari Torres (loan)	9	(0)
2017	→ Vibonese (loan)	18	(2)
- * Club domestic league appearances and goals as of 5 June 2015

Filippo Minarini (born 6 March 1994) is an Italian footballer who plays as defender.

== Club career ==
On 18 January 2017, he joined Vibonese on loan.
