= Egypt at the 2013 Mediterranean Games =

- IOC code: EGY
- NOC: Egyptian Olympic Committee

in Mersin
- Competitors: 40 in 3 sports
- Medals Ranked 5 th: Gold 21 Silver 22 Bronze 24 Total 67

Mediterranean Games appearances (overview)
- 1951; 1955; 1959–1967; 1971; 1975; 1979; 1983; 1987; 1991; 1993; 1997; 2001; 2005; 2009; 2013; 2018; 2022

Other related appearances
- United Arab Republic (1959, 1963)

Egypt competed at the 2013 Mediterranean Games in Mersin, Turkey from the 20th to 30 June 2013.

== Archery ==
Men

Athlete	Event	Ranking round		Round of 48	Round of 32	Round of 16	Quarterfinals	Semifinals	Final / BM	
Athlete	Event	Score	Seed	Opposition Score	Opposition Score	Opposition Score	Opposition Score	Opposition Score	Opposition Score	Rank
Ahmed El-Nemr	Individual									
Ibrahim Sabry	Individual									
Hady El-Khoulosy	Individual									
Ahmed El-Nemr; Ibrahim Sabry; Hady El-Khoulosy	Team			—N/a						

Women

Athlete	Event	Ranking round		Round of 48	Round of 32	Round of 16	Quarterfinals	Semifinals	Final / BM	
Athlete	Event	Score	Seed	Opposition Score	Opposition Score	Opposition Score	Opposition Score	Opposition Score	Opposition Score	Rank
Amira Mansour	Individual									
Nada Kamel	Individual									
Aya Kamel	Individual									
Amira Mansour; Nada Kamel; Aya Kamel	Team			—N/a						

== Athletics ==
Key

- Note–Ranks given for track events are within the athlete's heat only
- Q = Qualified for the next round
- q = Qualified for the next round as a fastest loser or, in field events, by position without achieving the qualifying target
- NR = National record
- N/A = Round not applicable for the event
- Bye = Athlete not required to compete in round

Men
Track & road events

Athlete	Event	Semifinal		Final	
Athlete	Event	Result	Rank	Result	Rank
Amr Ibrahim Seoud	100 m				
Amr Ibrahim Seoud	200 m				
Anas Abdel Aziz	400 m				
Mohamed Hamada	800 m				
Waled Gaber	1500 m T54				
Mahmoud Samir	1500 m T54				

Field events

Athlete	Event	Qualification		Final	
Athlete	Event	Distance	Position	Distance	Position
Ehab Abd El Rahman	Javelin throw	—N/a			
Mohamed Fathallah	Long jump	—N/a			
Yasser Fathy	Discus throw	—N/a			
Yasser Fathy	Shot put				
Mostafa Al-Gamel	Hammer throw	—N/a			
Hassan Mohamed Mahmoud	Hammer throw	—N/a			

== Badminton ==
Athlete	Event	Group Stage				Quarterfinal	Semifinal	Final / BM	
Athlete	Event	Opposition Score	Opposition Score	Opposition Score	Rank	Opposition Score	Opposition Score	Opposition Score	Rank
Abdelrahman Kashkal	Men's singles								
Hadia Hosny	Women's singles								

== Basketball ==
=== Men's tournament ===
Team

- Wael Badr
- Ahmed Hesham
- Ibrahim El-Gammal
- Shreef Geneidy
- Yousef Shousha
- Ibrahim Abo Khadra
- Mohamed El-Kerdany
- Asem Marei
- Haitham Kamal
- Ahmed El-Sabbagh
- Mohamed Khorshid
- Ramy Abdellah

Standings

Qualified for the semifinals

Team	Pld	W	L	PF	PA	PD	Pts
Turkey	3	3	0	260	191	+69	6
Macedonia	3	2	1	220	225	-5	5
Egypt	3	1	2	218	239	-21	4
Algeria	3	0	3	228	271	-43	3

Results

June 18
17:15

Report

North Macedonia	74–67 (OT)	Egypt
Scoring by quarter: 13–20, 12–8, 11–14, 20–14, Overtime: 18–11
Pts: Trajkovski 20; Rebs: Trajkovski 12; Asts: Karadžovski 5		Pts: El-Gammal 16; Rebs: Marei, Abdellah 11; Asts: Abdellah 4

Servet Tazegül Arena, Mersin
Referees: Ciulin (ROU), Tsekov (BUL), Martolini (ITA)

June 19
19:30

Report

Egypt	66–86	Turkey
Scoring by quarter: 15-23, 10-16, 20-20, 21-27
Pts: El-Gammal 19; Rebs: Marei 5 Asts: El-Gammal 4		Pts: Savaş 19; Rebs: Türkyılmaz 8 Asts: Ermiş 9

Servet Tazegül Arena, Mersin
Referees: Tsekov (BUL), Martolini (ITA), Licina (SRB)

June 21
17:45

Egypt	vs.	Algeria

Servet Tazegül Arena, Mersin

== Boxing ==
Men

Athlete	Event	Round of 16	Quarterfinals	Semifinals	Final	
Athlete	Event	Opposition Result	Opposition Result	Opposition Result	Opposition Result	Rank
Ramy Helmy	Light flyweight					
Hesham Yehia	Bantamweight					
Mohamed Ramadan	Lightweight					
Islam El Gendy	Light welterweight					
Hossam Abdeen	Middleweight					
Abdelrahman Oraby	Light heavyweight					
El Mohamady Amen	Heavyweight					
Maden Essa	Super heavyweight					

== Canoeing ==
Athlete	Event	Heats		Semifinals		Final	
Athlete	Event	Time	Rank	Time	Rank	Time	Rank
Mostafa Mansour	Men's K-1 200 m						
Mostafa Mansour	Men's K-1 1000 m						

== Fencing ==
Men

Athlete	Event	Group stage						Quarterfinal	Semifinal	Final / BM	
Athlete	Event	Opposition Score	Opposition Score	Opposition Score	Opposition Score	Opposition Score	Rank	Opposition Score	Opposition Score	Opposition Score	Rank
Ahmed El Saghier	Individual épée										
Ayman Mohamed Fayez	Individual épée										
Alaaeldin Abouelkassem	Individual foil										
Tarek Ayad	Individual foil										
Zyad El Sisy	Individual sabre										

Women

Athlete	Event	Group stage						Quarterfinal	Semifinal	Final / BM	
Athlete	Event	Opposition Score	Opposition Score	Opposition Score	Opposition Score	Opposition Score	Rank	Opposition Score	Opposition Score	Opposition Score	Rank
Eman Gaber	Individual foil										

== Handball ==
- Men's Tournament - 1 team of 16 athletes

== Sailing ==
Men

Athlete	Event	Race											Net points	Final rank
Athlete	Event	1	2	3	4	5	6	7	8	9	10	M*	Net points	Final rank
Ahmed Ragab	Laser													
Essameldin Seifeldin	Laser													

== Swimming ==
Men

Athlete	Event	Heat		Final	
Athlete	Event	Time	Rank	Time	Rank
Marwan Elkamash	400 m freestyle	3:55.18	3 Q		
Ahmed Akram	400 m freestyle	3:56.55	9	did not advance	
Abdelkader Afane	200 m individual medley				

Women

Athlete	Event	Heat		Final	
Athlete	Event	Time	Rank	Time	Rank
Reem Kassem	400 m freestyle				
Hania Moro	400 m freestyle				
Mai Mostafa	100 m breaststroke	1:12.73	10	did not advance	
	4×100 m freestyle relay				

== Volleyball ==
=== Men's tournament ===
Standings

Pos	Team	Pld	W	L	Pts	SW	SL	SR	SPW	SPL	SPR
1	France	2	1	1	4	5	4	1.250	214	215	0.995
2	Turkey	2	1	1	3	4	4	1.000	199	190	1.047
3	Egypt	2	1	1	2	4	5	0.800	193	201	0.960

Results

Date	Time		Score		Set 1	Set 2	Set 3	Set 4	Set 5	Total	Report
21-Jun	13:00	Egypt	–	France							
23-Jun	18:00	Turkey	–	Egypt							
