= Bosnia and Herzegovina at the 2013 Mediterranean Games =

- IOC code: BIH
- NOC: Olympic Committee of Bosnia and Herzegovina

in Mersin
- Competitors: 18 in 1 sport
- Flag bearer: Amel Mekić
- Medals Ranked 20th: Gold 0 Silver 1 Bronze 3 Total 4

Mediterranean Games appearances (overview)
- 1993; 1997; 2001; 2005; 2009; 2013; 2018; 2022

Other related appearances
- Yugoslavia (1951–1991)

Bosnia and Herzegovina competed at the 2013 Mediterranean Games in Mersin, Turkey from the 20th to 30 June 2013.

== Medal summary ==
=== Medalists ===
Medal	Name	Sport	Event
Silver	Amel Mekić	Judo	Men's 100 kg
Bronze	Hamza Alić	Athletics	Men's shot put
Bronze	Džemal Bošnjak	Boxing	Men's 81 kg
Bronze	Larisa Cerić	Judo	Women's +78 kg

== Athletics ==
Key

- Note–Ranks given for track events are within the athlete's heat only
- Q = Qualified for the next round
- q = Qualified for the next round as a fastest loser or, in field events, by position without achieving the qualifying target
- NR = National record
- N/A = Round not applicable for the event
- Bye = Athlete not required to compete in round

Men
Track & road events

Athlete	Event	Semifinal		Final	
Athlete	Event	Result	Rank	Result	Rank
Dušan Babić	800 m	1:52.59	14	did not advance	

Men
Field events

Athlete	Event	Qualification		Final	
Athlete	Event	Distance	Position	Distance	Position
Hamza Alić	Shot put			19.69	3rd place, bronze medalist(s)
Kemal Mešić	Shot put			19.60	4
Dejan Mileusnić	Javelin throw			77.27	4

Women
Track & road events

Athlete	Event	Final	
Athlete	Event	Result	Rank
Biljana Cvijanović	3000 m steeplechase	10:16.80 NR	8

== Football ==
=== Men's tournament ===
Team

- Vedran Kjoševski
- Omar Marković
- Armin Hodžić
- Amar Rahmanović
- Fedor Predragović
- Mirko Marić
- Branimir Odak
- Anto Petrović
- Jozo Špikić
- Haris Hajradinović
- Emir Plakalo
- Damir Sadiković
- Almir Čerimagić
- Renato Gojković
- Adin Čiva
- Almir Kasumović
- Haris Muharemović
- Halil Hajtić
- Marin Popović

Standings

Team	Pld	W	D	L	GF	GA	GD	Pts
Morocco	3	3	0	0	7	2	+5	9
Turkey	3	2	0	1	8	4	+4	6
Albania	3	0	1	2	3	6	−3	1
Bosnia and Herzegovina	3	0	1	2	4	10	−6	1

Results

June 19, 2013
18:00

Morocco	3 – 0	Bosnia and Herzegovina
Ennaffati 14'; El Karti 17'; Khaloua 73'	Report

Tevfik Sırrı Gür Stadium, Mersin
Referee: Alain Bieri (Switzerland)

June 21, 2013
18:00

Albania	v	Bosnia and Herzegovina

Tarsus Şehir Stadı, Tarsus

June 23, 2013
18:00

Bosnia and Herzegovina	v	Turkey

Tevfik Sırrı Gür Stadium, Mersin
