= Lütfullah Aksungur Sports Hall =

Indoor arena in Adana, Turkey

- Lütfullah Aksungur Spor Salonu (Turkish)
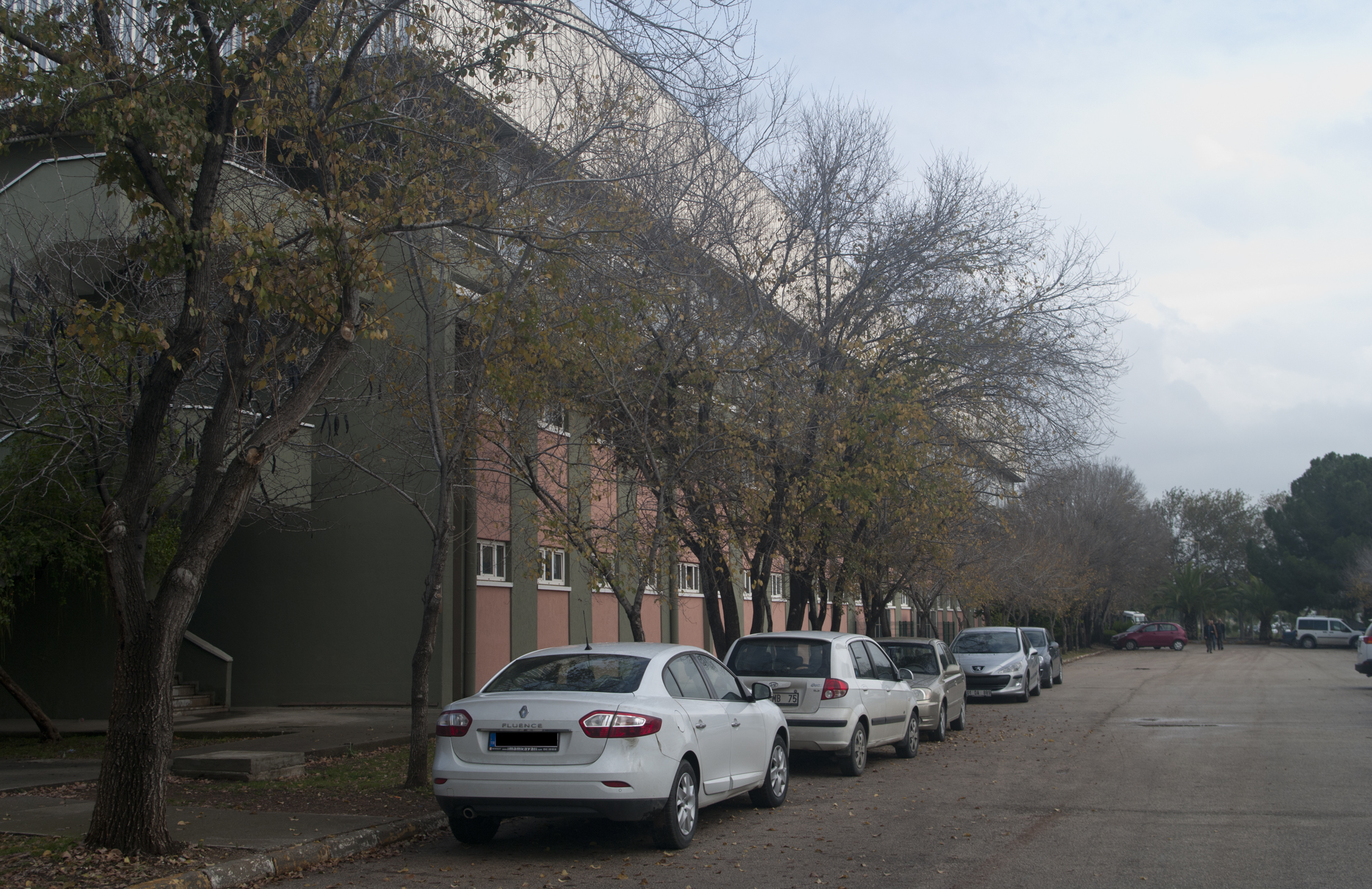
- Lütfullah Aksungur Sports Hall
- Interactive map of Lütfullah Aksungur Sports Hall
- Location: Adana, Turkey
- Coordinates: 37.053797°N 35.358021°E
- Owner: Çukurova University
- Capacity: 1,750

Construction
- Opened: 1994

The Lütfullah Aksungur Sports Hall (Turkish: Lütfullah Aksungur Spor Salonu) is an indoor arena for handball competitions located in Adana, Turkey. It has a seating capacity of 1,750. The venue was built in 1994. Owned by Çukurova University, the venue is named in honor of Prof. Dr. Lütfullah Aksungur (1925-1986), a dermatologist and founding dean of the university as well as its rector between 1977 and 1980.

The sport hall was renovated and modernized for the use of 2013 Mediterranean Games by the Provincial Youth Services and Sports Directoriate costing ₺2.5 million.

At 2013 Mediterranean Games, the arena hosted men's handball event between 23–30 June.
