= Giuseppe Palma =

Italian footballer

Personal information
- Date of birth: 20 January 1994 (age 32)
- Place of birth: Naples, Italy
- Height: 1.86 m (6 ft 1 in)
- Position: Central midfielder

Team information
- Current team: Nocerina
- Number: 25

Youth career
- 2011–2013: Napoli

Senior career*
Years	Team	Apps	(Gls)
2013–2016	Napoli	0	(0)
2013–2014	→ Vicenza (loan)	5	(0)
2014	→ Paganese (loan)	9	(1)
2015	→ Spyris Kaunas (loan)	18	(1)
2015–2016	→ Ischia (loan)	18	(1)
2016–2017	Chiasso	26	(0)
2017–2018	Mantova	25	(1)
2018–2019	Rieti	48	(2)
2019–2020	Turris	8	(3)
2020–2021	FC Messina	34	(8)
2021–2023	Cavese	57	(6)
2023	Livorno	4	(0)
2023–2024	Acireale	21	(0)
2024–2025	Puteolana	29	(3)
2025	Real Acerrana	9	(1)
2025–2026	Sarnese	8	(0)
2026–	Nocerina	12	(0)

International career
2012–2013	Italy U19	5	(1)
- * Club domestic league appearances and goals as of 22 Juny 2026

Giuseppe Palma (born 20 January 1994) is an Italian footballer who plays as a midfielder for Serie D club Nocerina.

== Club career ==
On 19 July 2018, Palma signed with Serie C club Rieti.

On 12 December 2019 he agreed to join Serie D club Turris.

On 31 July 2021 he signed with Cavese in Serie D.

== National team ==
Palma has one cap for the Italy U19 team.
