= Youba Sissokho =

Spanish boxer (born 1991)

Personal information
- Nationality: Spanish
- Born: Youba Sissokho Ndiaye; 7 November 1991 (age 34) Dakar, Senegal
- Height: 182 cm (6 ft 0 in)
- Weight: 69 kg (152 lb)

Boxing career
- Weight class: Welterweight
Medal record
Men's amateur boxing
Representing Spain
European Championships
| Bronze medal – third place | 2015 Samokov | Welterweight |
EU Championships
| Silver medal – second place | 2018 Valladolid | Welterweight |
Mediterranean Games
| Silver medal – second place | 2013 Mersin | Welterweight |
| Silver medal – second place | 2018 Tarragona | Welterweight |

Youba Sissokho Ndiaye (born 7 November 1991) is a Senegalese-born Spanish boxer. He competed in the men's welterweight event at the 2016 Summer Olympics. He was born in Dakar and moved to Majorca at six months.
