= Adam Ennafati =

Moroccan footballer (born 1994)

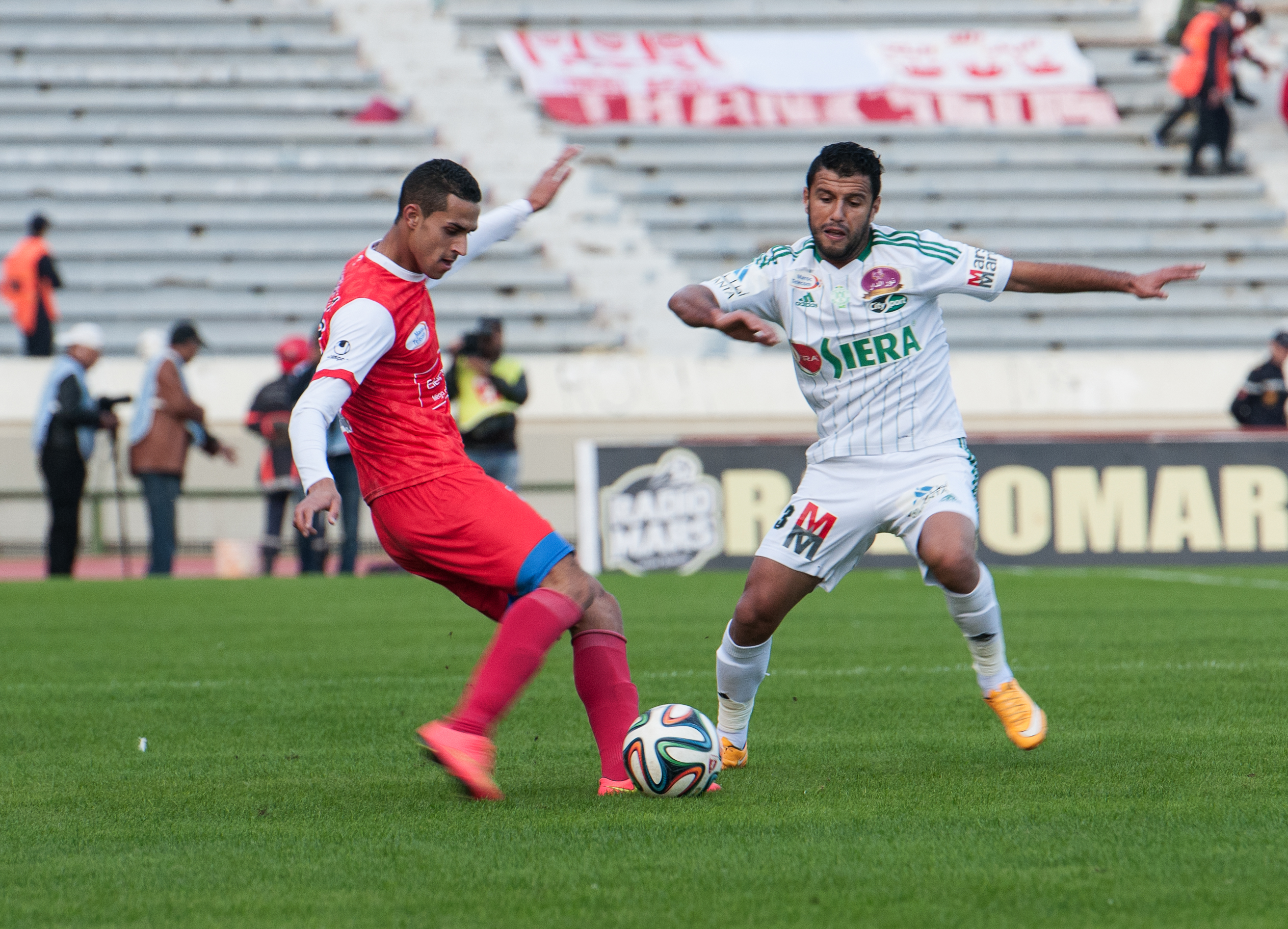
- Ennafati in 2014

Personal information
- Date of birth: 29 June 1994 (age 32)
- Place of birth: Rabat, Morocco
- Height: 1.80 m (5 ft 11 in)
- Position: Winger

Team information
- Current team: Raja CA
- Number: 77

Youth career
- –2012: AM Football

Senior career*
Years	Team	Apps	(Gls)
2012–2014	Lille B		
2014–2019	FUS Rabat	51	(7)
2017–2018	→ Olympique Khouribga (loan)	23	(5)
2019–2021	Mouloudia Oujda	44	(7)
2021–2022	Emirates	11	(0)
2022	→ AS FAR (loan)	15	(3)
2022–2023	AS FAR	23	(3)
2023–	Raja CA	86	(28)

International career^{‡}
2011	Morocco U17	2	(0)
2011–2013	Morocco U20	19	(9)
2013–2015	Morocco U23	13	(4)
2014–	Morocco	3	(0)
Medal record
Men's football
Representing Morocco
Mediterranean Games
Winner	2013 Turkey
Islamic Solidarity Games
Winner	2013 Indonesia
African Nations Championship
Winner	2020 Morocco
- * Club domestic league appearances and goals as of 13 September 2026 ‡ National team caps and goals as of 16:33, 22 March 2025 (UTC)

Adam Ennafati (Arabic: آدم النفاتي; born 29 June 1994) is a Moroccan professional footballer who plays for Raja Club Athletic as a winger.

== Club career ==
Ennafati's professional career as a footballer started in French Lille OSC reserve team, Lille OSC B after the club completed the signing of the player from AM Football on 7 February 2012 in a five-year contract. The deal was completed on 1 July 2012. Ennafati stay at the Championnat de France amateur side didn't last long, as he moved to his hometown club FUS Rabat in July 2014 after spending just 2 years in France. He scored only 3 goals and played 22 appearances in his first season with club, he also received a 2014 Moroccan Throne Cup winners medal. The next season wasn't much different for Ennafati, as he scored only 2 goals in 17 appearances with the club but he helped the club to win the Botola title for the first time in the club's history. In the following season, 2016–17 season, Ennafati scored 1 goal from 17 appearances with club, his only goal that season was in a 2–1 win against league champions Wydad Casablanca.

On 17 August 2017, Ennafati was loaned to Olympique Khouribga in a one-year deal, with Olympique Khouribga having an option to make the transfer permanent at the end of the season. He scored his first goal with Khouribga in a league match against Moghreb Tétouan on 8 December 2017.

== International career ==
Ennafati represented Morocco at U17, U20, U23 and senior level. He appeared in many tournaments with the youth teams, including the 2013 Mediterranean Games Football Tournament and 2015 Toulon Tournament, where he showed great performance in the tournament in both group stage and the final against France, where he scored the only goal for his team as they lost 1–3. He played only 1 match with the senior team in a friendly match against Gabon on 3 May 2014.

== Honours ==
FUS Rabat

- Botola: 2015–16
- Moroccan Throne Cup: 2013–14

AS FAR

- Botola: 2022–23
- Moroccan Throne Cup: 2019–20

Raja CA

- Botola: 2023–24
- Moroccan Throne Cup: 2023-24

Morocco

- African Nations Championship: 2021
- Mediterranean Games Football Tournament: 2013
- Islamic Solidarity Games Football Tournament: 2013
