= Cyprus at the 2013 Mediterranean Games =

- IOC code: CYP
- NOC: Cyprus Olympic Committee

in Mersin
- Competitors: 5 in 3 sports
- Medals Ranked 14th: Gold 2 Silver 2 Bronze 3 Total 7

Mediterranean Games appearances (overview)
- 1979; 1983; 1987; 1991; 1993; 1997; 2001; 2005; 2009; 2013; 2018; 2022

Cyprus competed at the 2013 Mediterranean Games in Mersin, Turkey from the 20th to 30 June 2013.

== Medalists ==
Medal	Name	Sport	Event
Gold	Eleni Artymata	Athletics	Women's 200 metres
Gold	Nektaria Panagi	Athletics	Women's long jump
Silver	Skevi Andreou, Ramona Papanioannou, Demetra Kyriakidou, Eleni Artymata	Athletics	Women's 4 x 100 metres
Silver	Georgios Achilleos	Shooting	Skeet individual
Bronze	Eleni Artymata	Athletics	Women's 100 metres
Bronze	Anna Ioannou	Rowing	Women's lightweight single sculls
Bronze	Kyriaki Kouttouki	Taekwando	Women's flyweight (49 kg)

== Rowing ==
Men

Athlete	Event	Heats		Semifinals		Final	
Athlete	Event	Time	Rank	Time	Rank	Time	Rank
Aristotelis Ioannou; Omiros Antoniou	Lightweight double sculls						

Women

Athlete	Event	Heats		Semifinals		Final	
Athlete	Event	Time	Rank	Time	Rank	Time	Rank
Anna Ioannou	Lightweight single sculls						

== Sailing ==
Men

Athlete	Event	Race											Net points	Final rank
Athlete	Event	1	2	3	4	5	6	7	8	9	10	M*	Net points	Final rank
Haris Papadopoulos	Laser													

== Swimming ==
Men

Athlete	Event	Heat		Final	
Athlete	Event	Time	Rank	Time	Rank
Lefkios Xanthou	100 m breaststroke	1:07.54	15	did not advance	
