= Fatih Keleş =

Turkish boxer (born 1989)

Personal information
- Full name: Fatih Sefer Keleş
- Nationality: Turkish
- Born: Fatih Sefer Keleş; 27 November 1989 (age 36) Trabzon, Turkey
- Height: 1.75 m (5.7 ft)
- Weight: 60 kg (132 lb)

Sport
- Country: Turkey
- Sport: Amateur boxing
- Event: Lightweight
- Coached by: Nazmi Dalkıran
Medal record
European Amateur Championships
Gold medal – first place	2011 Ankara	Lightweight
Mediterranean Games
Silver medal – second place	2013 Mersin	Lightweight

Fatih Keleş (born 27 November 1989 in Trabzon, Turkey) is a European champion Turkish amateur boxer competing in the lightweight division. He is a member of the Kocaeli BB Kağıt S.K. in Izmit. He is coached by Nazmi Dalkıran.

== Early life ==
He was born on 27 November 1989 in Trabzon. He is a physical education and sports student at Karadeniz Technical University. Black Sea Technical University.

== Amateur career ==
Fatih Keleş began boxing at ten years of age. His brother is also an amateur boxer.

He won the gold medal at the 2011 European Amateur Championships held in Ankara, Turkey. He took part in the 2012 Summer Olympics. At the 2013 Mediterranean Games held in Mersin, Turkey, he became a silver medalist.

== Professional boxing record ==
15 fights	12 wins	1 loss
By knockout	7	0
By decision	5	1
Draws	1	
No contests	1	

No.	Result	Record	Opponent	Type	Round, time	Date	Location	Notes
15	Win	12–1–1 (1)	Ivan Njegac (CRO)	TKO	1 (6), 2:54	8 February 2020	EWS Arena, Göppingen, Germany	
14	Loss	11–1–1 (1)	Liam Paro (AUS)	UD	10	8 June 2019	The Star, Gold Coast, Australia	For vacant IBF International and WBO Global light welterweight titles
13	Win	11–0–1 (1)	Vusal Verdiyev (AZE)	TKO	3 (6), 2:32	2 March 2019	Hendek, Turkey	
12	NC	10–0–1 (1)	Maxim Churbanov (RUS)	NC	2 (10), 1:04	19 May 2018	Spor Salonu, Trabzon, Nigeria	Retained WBO European light welterweight title
11	Win	10–0–1	Renald Garrido (FRA)	MD	10	22 December 2017	Sporthalle, Hamburg, Germany	Retained WBO European light welterweight title
10	Draw	9–0–1	Renald Garrido (FRA)	MD	10	15 July 2017	EWS Arena, Göppingen, Germany	Retained WBO European light welterweight title
9	Win	9–0	Rafik Harutjunjan (NED)	UD	10	19 May 2017	Barclaycard Arena, Hamburg, Germany	Won vacant WBO European light welterweight title
8	Win	8–0	Bakhtiyar Isgandarzada (AZE)	PTS	6	18 March 2017	Silence Hotel, Istanbul, Turkey	
7	Win	7–0	Reza Rahimi (IRN)	TKO	1 (4), 2:10	28 October 2016	Zirkustelt, Hamburg, Germany	
6	Win	6–0	Denis Krieger (MLD)	MD	8	15 October 2016	G 18-Halle, Hamburg, Germany	
5	Win	5–0	Pavel Mozga (CZE)	TKO	3 (8), 0:34	17 September 2016	EWS Arena, Göppingen, Germany	
4	Win	4–0	Michal Vosyka (CZE)	TKO	1 (4), 1:25	4 June 2016	Autohaus Duerkop, Kassel, Germany	
3	Win	3–0	Ion Barsan (ROM)	TKO	1 (4), 2:02	22 May 2016	KW Eventcenter, Königs Wusterhausen, Germany	
2	Win	2–0	Mazen Girke (GER)	PTS	6	13 May 2016	Boxcamp P1, Berlin, Germany	
1	Win	1–0	Adnan Oezcoban (GER)	TKO	1 (6), 1:40	24 April 2016	Box-Out, Hamburg, Germany	
