= Hicham Khaloua =

Moroccan footballer (born 1995)

Personal information
- Full name: Hicham Khaloua Khaloua
- Date of birth: 7 May 1995 (age 31)
- Place of birth: San Javier, Murcia, Spain
- Height: 1.77 m (5 ft 10 in)
- Position: Forward

Team information
- Current team: Union de Touarga

Youth career
- 2002–2005: Mar Menor
- 2005–2011: Cartagena
- 2011–2013: Almería

Senior career*
Years	Team	Apps	(Gls)
2012–2016	Almería B	112	(29)
2013–2019	Almería	24	(2)
2016–2017	→ Celta B (loan)	40	(16)
2018–2019	→ Castellón (loan)	17	(2)
2019	→ UCAM Murcia (loan)	10	(2)
2019–2020	Melilla	16	(2)
2020	Cádiz B	5	(0)
2020–2021	Maghreb Tetouan	28	(8)
2022–	Union de Touarga	28	(6)

International career
2013–2015	Morocco U20	10	(9)
2016	Morocco U23	3	(0)
- * Club domestic league appearances and goals as of 30 September 2024

Hicham Khaloua Khaloua (born 7 May 1995) is a footballer who plays as a forward for Union de Touarga. Born in Spain, he has represented Morocco at under-20 and under-23 international levels.

== Club career ==
Born in San Javier, Murcia to Moroccan parents, Hicham started his youth career with local Mar Menor CF, and in 2005 he joined FC Cartagena at the age of 14. On 14 July 2011, after being linked with FC Barcelona, Real Madrid, Málaga CF, Liverpool, Manchester United and Chelsea, he went on a trial at Manchester City, but nothing came of it.

On 2 August 2011, still a junior, Hicham signed for UD Almería. He made his senior debut with the B-team in the 2011–12 season, in Segunda División B.

On 14 July 2013, Hicham signed a new deal with the Andalusians, running until 2018. On 18 December he played his first official game with the main squad, featuring the last 32 minutes in a 0–0 home draw against UD Las Palmas for the campaign's Copa del Rey.

On 24 March 2014, aged 18, Hicham came on as a late substitute in a La Liga home fixture against Real Sociedad, and scored a last-minute 4–3 winner after just three minutes on the pitch on the day of his league debut. On 19 July 2016 he was loaned to another reserve team, Celta de Vigo B also in the third division, with a buyout clause.

On 17 August 2017, after returning from loan, Hicham renewed with Almería until 2021, being definitely promoted to the main squad. The following 11 July, he was loaned to third-level club CD Castellón for one year.

On 24 January 2019, Hicham joined fellow third division side UCAM Murcia CF on loan until June. On 31 July, after returning from loan, he terminated his contract with the Rojiblancos, and signed for UD Melilla on 2 August.

On 27 January 2020, Hicham agreed to a 18-month contract with Cádiz CF, being assigned to the B-team in the third tier.

== International career ==
Hicham was called up to the Morocco under-20 team in April 2013, and also appeared with the nation in the 2013 Mediterranean Games, netting five times in as many matches as the tournament ended in conquest. He was also called up to the under-23s in May 2016.

== Honours ==
Morocco U20

- Football at the Mediterranean Games: 2013

Individual

- Football at the Mediterranean Games top scorer: 2013
