= Luigi Canotto =

Italian football player

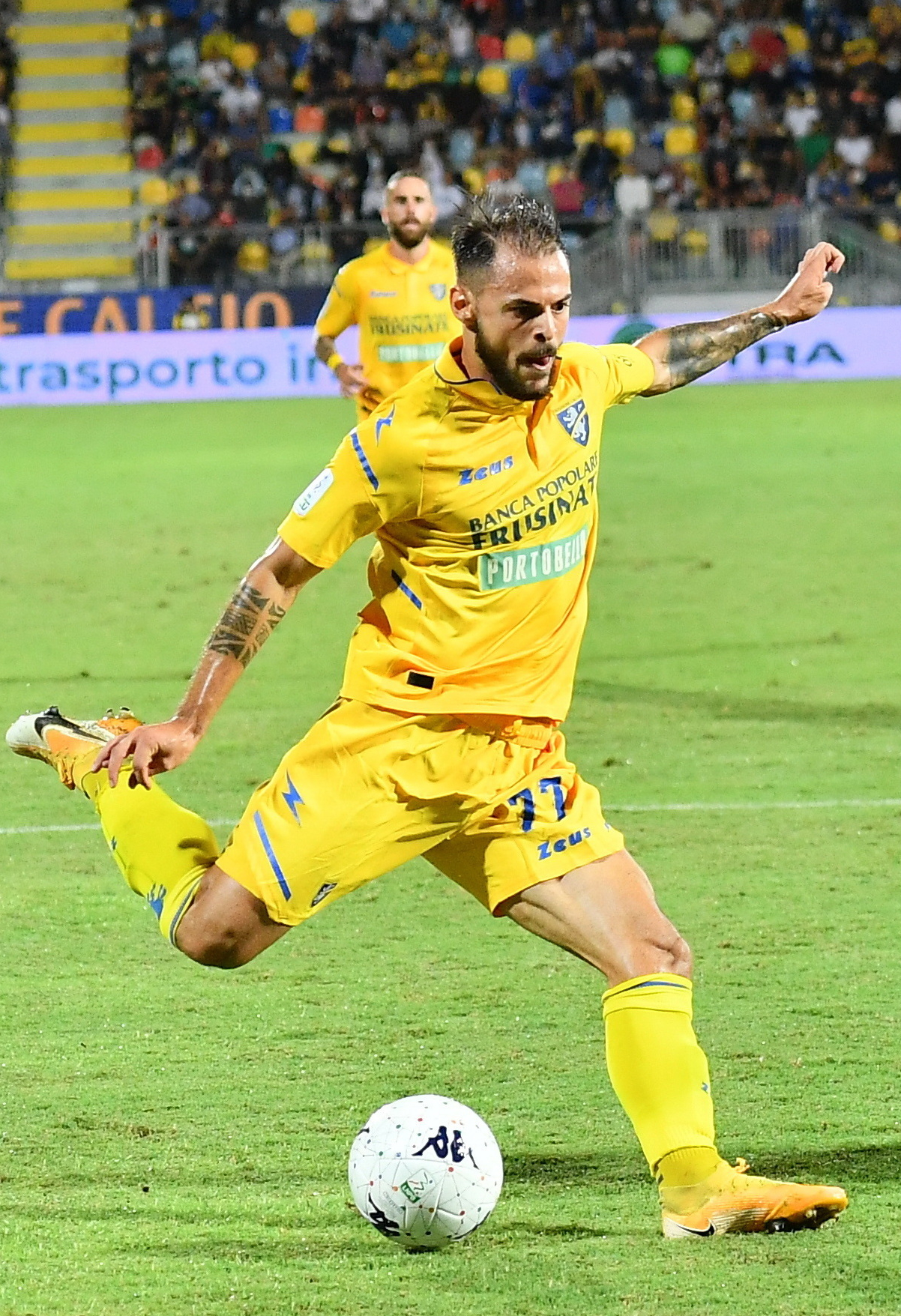

Personal information
- Date of birth: 19 May 1994 (age 32)
- Place of birth: Rossano, Italy
- Height: 1.78 m (5 ft 10 in)
- Position: Forward

Team information
- Current team: Perugia
- Number: 10

Youth career
- Reggina

Senior career*
Years	Team	Apps	(Gls)
2010–2013	Siena	0	(0)
2010–2011	→ Rossanese (loan)	12	(0)
2011	→ Salernitana (loan)	4	(0)
2013–2014	Sorrento	24	(3)
2014	Südtirol	1	(0)
2015	Agropoli	18	(10)
2015–2016	Melfi	36	(4)
2016–2017	Trapani	13	(0)
2017–2020	Juve Stabia	87	(18)
2020–2021	Chievo	33	(5)
2021–2025	Frosinone	45	(7)
2022–2023	→ Reggina (loan)	37	(6)
2023–2024	→ Cosenza (loan)	23	(1)
2025–2026	Trapani	20	(4)
2026–	Perugia	14	(0)

International career^{‡}
2013	Italy U-19	5	(2)
- * Club domestic league appearances and goals as of 30 April 2026 ‡ National team caps and goals as of 26 June 2013

Luigi Canotto (born 19 May 1994) is an Italian professional footballer who plays as a forward for Serie C Group B club Perugia.

== Club career ==
He made his professional debut in the Lega Pro for Südtirol on 11 October 2014 in a game against Renate.

On 28 August 2020 he became a Chievo player.

On 4 August 2021, he signed a three-year contract with Frosinone.

On 25 July 2022, Canotto moved to Reggina on loan with a conditional obligation to buy.

Upon his return from Reggina, Canotto made his Serie A debut for Frosinone on 19 August 2023 against Napoli.

On 1 September 2023, Canotto was loaned by Cosenza, with an option to buy.
