= Luca Iotti =

Italian footballer

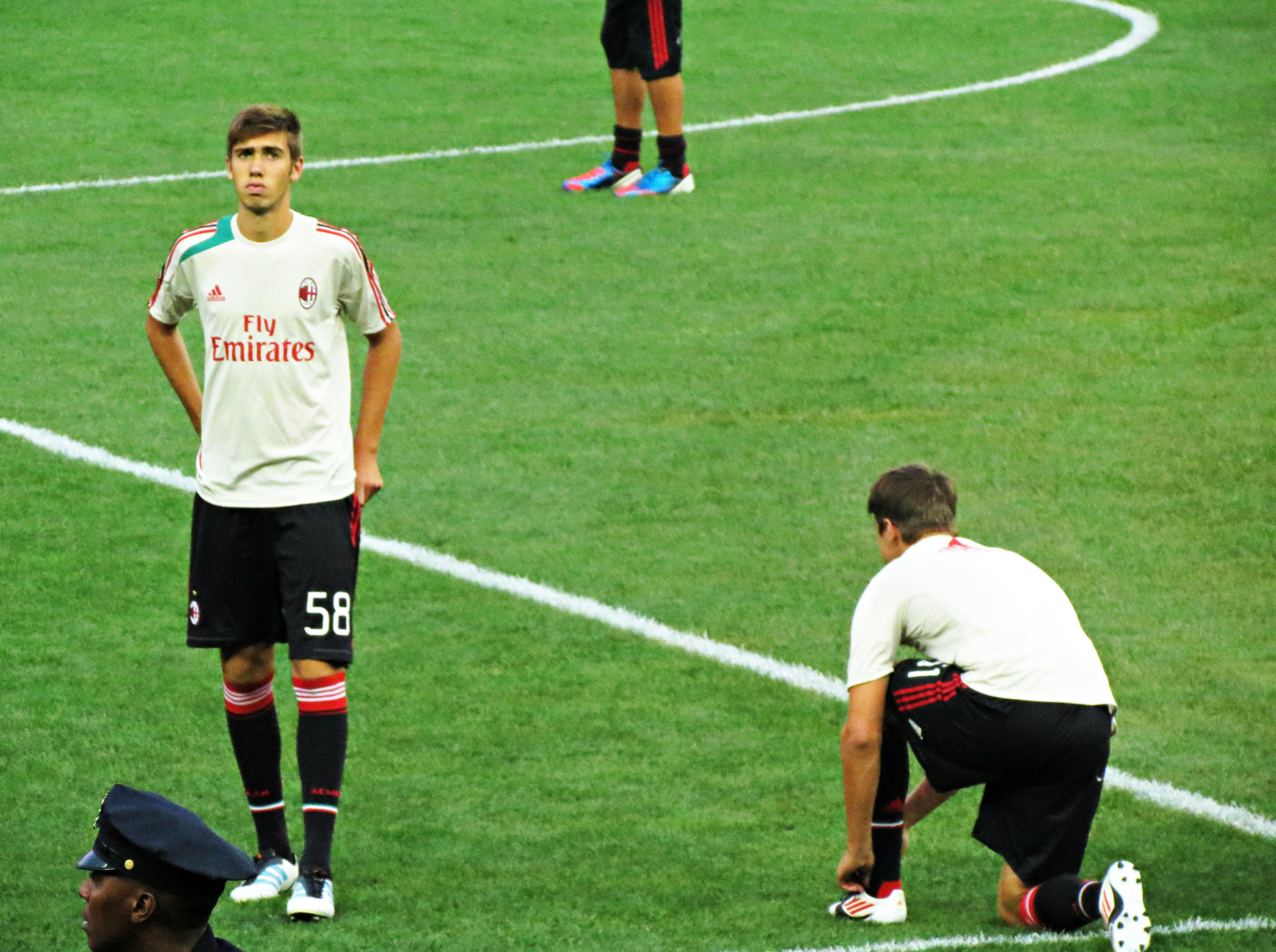

Personal information
- Date of birth: 9 November 1995 (age 31)
- Place of birth: Cernusco sul Naviglio, Italy
- Height: 1.89 m (6 ft 2 in)
- Position: Defender

Team information
- Current team: Pro Sesto
- Number: 50

Youth career
- –2014: Milan

Senior career*
Years	Team	Apps	(Gls)
2013–2014	Milan	0	(0)
2014–2016	Elche Ilicitano		
2016–2017	Ascoli	0	(0)
2017	→ Olbia (loan)	10	(0)
2017–2019	Olbia	65	(2)
2019–2021	Teramo	19	(1)
2021	Feralpisalò	9	(0)
2021–2022	Ancona-Matelica	37	(0)
2022–2023	Mantova	24	(0)
2023–	Pro Sesto	8	(0)

International career
2011–2012	Italy U-17	7	(0)
2012–2013	Italy U-18	12	(2)
2013–2014	Italy U-19	11	(1)
2015	Italy U-20	3	(0)
- * Club domestic league appearances and goals as of 3 May 2024

Luca Iotti (born 9 November 1995) is an Italian footballer who plays as a defender for Serie D club Pro Sesto.

== Club career ==
He made his Serie C debut for Olbia on 26 February 2017 in a game against Giana Erminio.

On 29 August 2019, he signed a 2-year contract with Teramo.

On 26 January 2021 he moved to Feralpisalò.

On 6 July 2021, he joined Matelica.

On 14 July 2022, Iotti signed with Mantova.
