= Fabio Aveni =

Italian footballer

Personal information
- Full name: Fabio Salvatore Aveni
- Date of birth: 5 September 1994 (age 32)
- Place of birth: Barcellona Pozzo di Gotto, Italy
- Height: 1.78 m (5 ft 10 in)
- Position: Striker

Team information
- Current team: Nuova Igea Virtus
- Number: 28

Youth career
- –2014: Catania

Senior career*
Years	Team	Apps	(Gls)
2013–2015	Catania	2	(0)
2013–2014	→ Perugia (loan)	0	(0)
2015	Juve Stabia	0	(0)
2015–2017	Akragas	1	(0)
2017–2018	Igea Virtus	10	(2)
2019	Gela	3	(0)
2020–2021	Città di Sant'Agata	10	(0)
2022–	Nuova Igea Virtus	5	(2)
- * Club domestic league appearances and goals as of 8 October 2023

Fabio Salvatore Aveni (born 5 September 1994) is an Italian footballer who plays as a striker for Serie D club Nuova Igea Virtus.

== Club career ==
Aveni is a youth exponent from Catania. He made his Serie A debut on 18 May 2014 in a 2–1 home win against Atalanta.
