= Mohamed Amine Ouadahi =

Algerian boxer (born 1987)

Mohamed Amine Ouadahi (born 8 July 1987, Aïn Defla, Algeria) is an Algerian boxer. At the 2012 Summer Olympics, he competed in the Men's bantamweight, but was defeated in the third round by Satoshi Shimizu of Japan.
