= Abdelkader Bouhenia =

French boxer

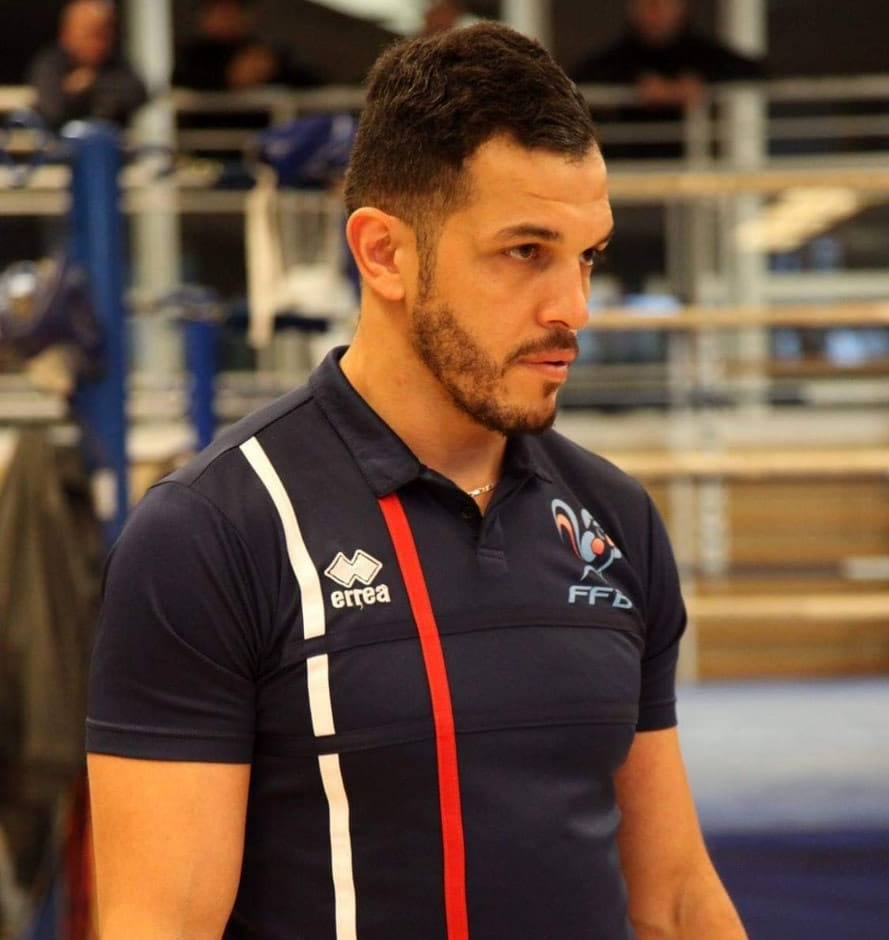

Personal information
- Born: 7 May 1986 (age 40)
Medal record
Men's Boxing
Representing France
World Amateur Championships
Bronze medal – third place	2009 Milan	Light Heavyweight
European Amateur Championships
Silver medal – second place	2010 Moscow	Light Heavyweight

Abdelkader Bouhenia (born 7 May 1986) is a boxer from Carcassonne. He is best known for having won the bronze medal in the light-heavyweight division at the 2009 World Amateur Boxing Championships in Milan.

== Career ==
Bouhenia, who fights from an orthodox stance, beat Daugirdas Semiotas at the 2009 World Amateur Boxing Championships. He then scored a huge upset by defeating Irish southpaw, Kenneth Egan. Bouhenia later lost in the semifinals to another southpaw, Elshod Rasulov (4:8).

At the 2012 European Boxing Olympic he lost his second fight and didn't qualify.
