= Dimitar Karadžovski =

Macedonian basketball player

Dimitar Karadzovski
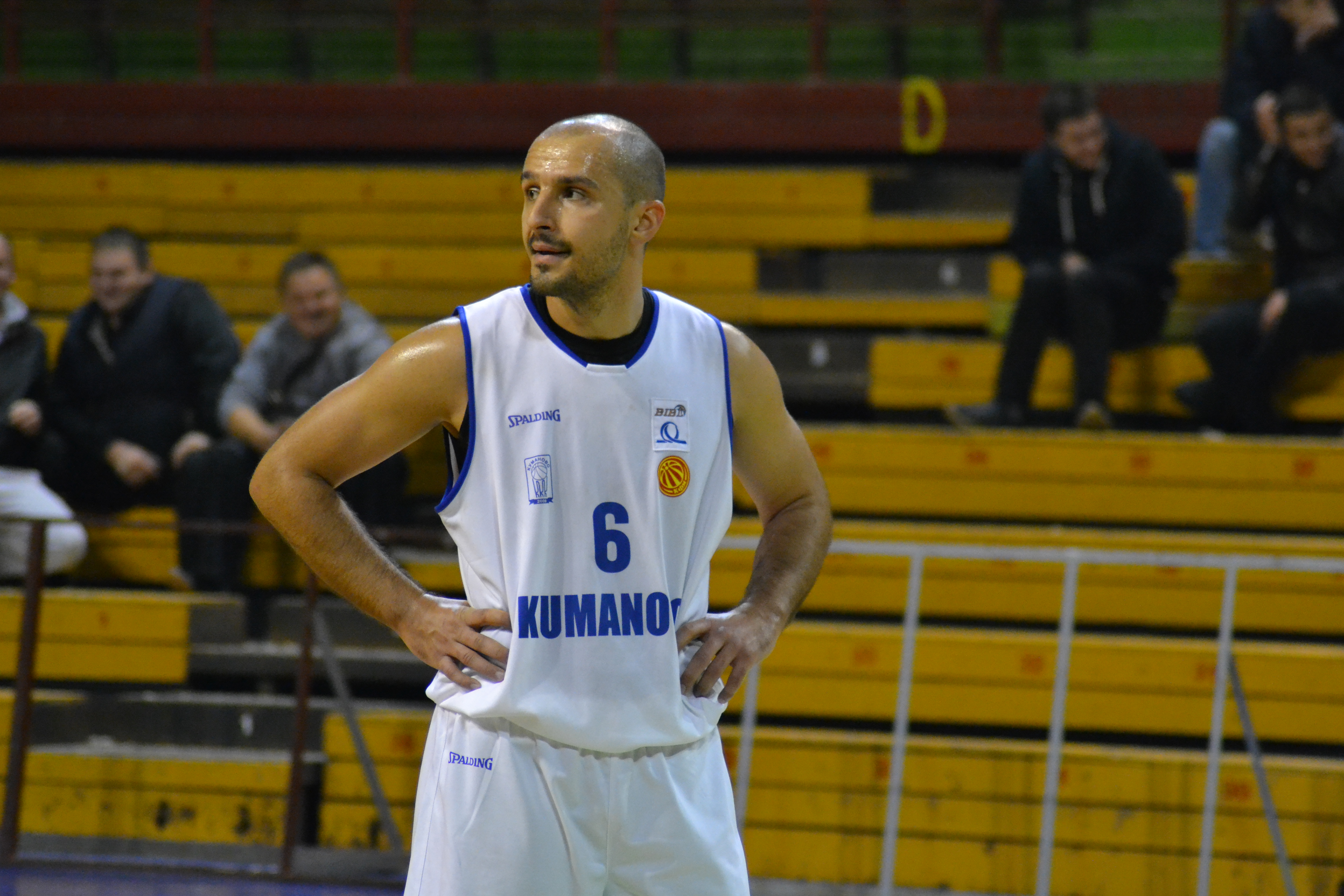

Personal information
- Born: October 7, 1984 (age 42) Skopje, SR Macedonia
- Listed height: 1.90 m (6 ft 3 in)
- Listed weight: 85 kg (187 lb)

Career information
- Playing career: 2002–2025
- Position: Point guard / shooting guard

Career history
- 2002–2005: MZT Skopje
- 2005–2007: Skallagrímur
- 2007–2008: Stjarnan
- 2008–2009: Pelister
- 2009–2010: Torus
- 2010–2011: Rilski Sportist
- 2011–2012: Torus
- 2012–2014: Kožuv
- 2014–2015: Feni Industries
- 2015–2018: Kumanovo
- 2018–2019: Rabotnički
- 2019–2021: Kožuv
- 2021: Rabotnički
- 2021–2023: Pelister
- 2023–2025: Kožuv

Career highlights
- Macedonian League champion (2018)

Dimitar Karadžovski (born October 7, 1984) is a Macedonian former professional basketball player.

== Professional career ==
During his career, Karadžovski played for MZT Skopje, Ungmennafélagið Skallagrímur, Stjarnan, KK Pelister, KK Torus BC Rilski Sportist, KK Kozuv and KK Feni Industries.

== Playing career ==
=== Iceland ===
In 2005, Karadžovski signed with Skallagrímur in the Icelandic Úrvalsdeild karla. After playing two seasons with Skallagrímur, where he averaged 17.0 points and 4.9 assists, Karadžovski signed a 2-year contract with Úrvalsdeild club Stjarnan in May 2007. For the season, he averaged 21.1 points and 5.3 assists. In April 2008, after Stjarnan's season ended, he was fired by the club after he was arrested by the police for grand theft. The Stjarnan's locker room had been plagued with theft during the season and a police search of Karadžovski apartment revealed a large amount of stolen items. An accomplice of his was also arrested on his way out of the country with large amount of stolen items.

=== Later career ===
On February 18, 2015, he signed with KK Kumanovo.

In March, 2018, he signed with Rabotnički.

In July 2019, he signed with Kožuv.

=== National basketball career ===
He played at the 2010 FIBA EuroBasket 2011 qualification with Macedonia national basketball team.
