= Eslam El-Gendy =

Egyptian boxer (born 1990)

Eslam Mohamed (born 3 March 1990 in Giza, Egypt) is an Egyptian boxer.

At the 2012 Summer Olympics, he competed in the Men's light welterweight but was defeated in the first round by Gyula Káté.
