= Morocco at the 2013 Mediterranean Games =

- IOC code: MAR
- NOC: Moroccan Olympic Committee

in Mersin
- Competitors: 18 in 1 sport
- Medals Ranked th: Gold 7 Silver 10 Bronze 11 Total 28

Mediterranean Games appearances (overview)
- 1959; 1963; 1967; 1971; 1975; 1979; 1983; 1987; 1991; 1993; 1997; 2001; 2005; 2009; 2013; 2018; 2022

Morocco competed at the 2013 Mediterranean Games in Mersin, Turkey from the 20th to 30 June 2013.

== Football ==
=== Men's tournament ===
Team

- Badreddine Benrachour
- Omar Boutayeb
- Mohamed Saidi
- Hamza Moussadak
- Mohammed El Jaaouani
- Adam Ennaffati
- Adnane El Ouardy
- Reda En-Neoualy
- Youssef Es Saiydy
- Mohamed Cheikhi
- Walid El Karti
- Aymane El Hassouni
- El Mehdi Moufaddal
- Hamza Mouatamid
- Elmehdi Dghoughi
- Reda Hajhouj
- Mohamed El Makahasi
- Hicham Khaloua

Standings

Team	Pld	W	D	L	GF	GA	GD	Pts
Morocco	3	3	0	0	7	2	+5	9
Turkey	3	2	0	1	8	4	+4	6
Albania	3	0	1	2	3	6	−3	1
Bosnia and Herzegovina	3	0	1	2	4	10	−6	1

Results

June 19, 2013
18:00

Morocco	3 – 0	Bosnia and Herzegovina
Ennaffati 14'; El Karti 17'; Khaloua 73'	Report

Tevfik Sırrı Gür Stadium, Mersin
Referee: Alain Bieri (Switzerland)

June 21, 2013
21:45

Turkey	1 - 2	Morocco

Tarsus Şehir Stadı, Tarsus

June 23, 2013
21:45

Morocco	2 - 1	Albania

Tevfik Sırrı Gür Stadium, Mersin
