= Tarsus Arena =

Indoor sporting arena located in Turkey

- Tarsus Spor Salonu
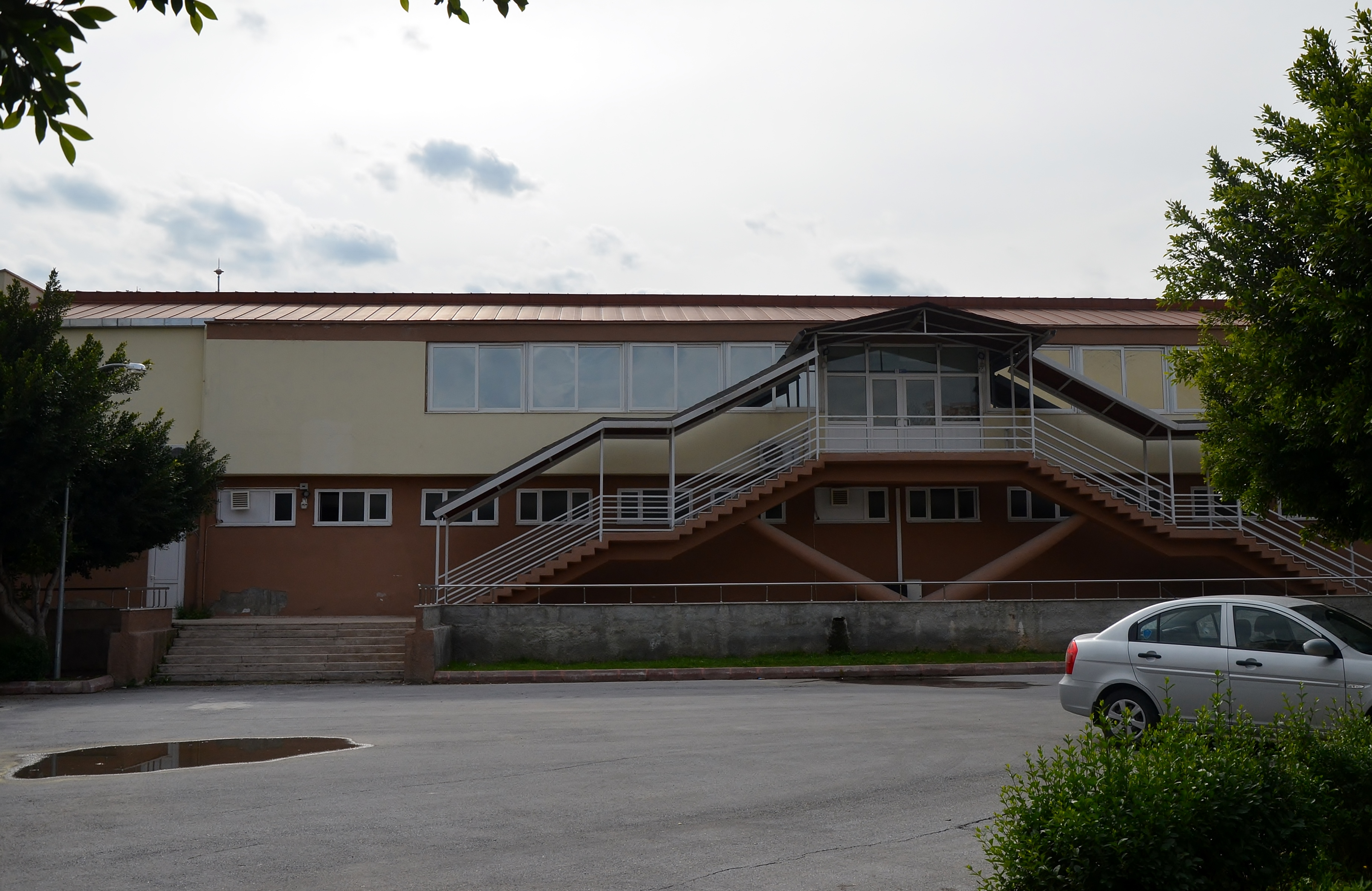
- Tarsus Arena (April 2015).
- Interactive map of Tarsus Arena
- Location: Tarsus, Mersin Province, Turkey
- Coordinates: 36°54′50″N 34°53′14″E
- Owner: Youth Services and Sports Directoriate of Mersin
- Capacity: 1,500

Construction
- Opened: 1990; 36 years ago

Tenant
- Tarsus Belediyespor women's basketball

The Tarsus Arena (Turkish: Tarsus Spor Salonu) is a multi-sport indoor arena at Tarsus in Mersin Province, Turkey. Built in 1990, it is owned by the Youth Services and Sports Directoriate of Mersin and has a seating capacity of 1,500. It was renovated and modernized for use by the 2013 Mediterranean Games.

The venue is situated next to the Tarsus City Stadium. It is suitable for events of badminton, basketball, boxing, karate, volleyball, wrestling etc. The arena is home to Tarsus Belediyespor women's basketball team, which plays in the Turkish Women's Basketball League (TKBL). During the 2013 Mediterranean Games, the arena hosted boxing competitions on June 21–23.
