= Sports venues in Mersin =

Sport venues in Mersin, Turkey

Below is the list of sport venues in Mersin, Turkey. Some of these were constructed for the 2013 Mediterranean Games. (The list excludes those venues in Mersin Province, out of Mersin city)

Name	Place	Opening date
Edip Buran Arena	Akdeniz, Mersin	1971
Macit Özcan Sports Complex	Yenişehir, Mersin	2008
Mersin Seventh Region Sports Hall	Toroslar, Mersin	2005
Mersin Gymnastics Hall	Yenişehir, Mersin	2013
Mersin Stadium	Yenişehir, Mersin	2013
Mersin Olympic Swimming Pool	Yenişehir, Mersin	2013
Mersin Tennis Complex	Yenişehir, Mersin	2013
Mersin Volleyball Hall	Yenişehir, Mersin	2013
Mezitli Sports Hall	Mezitli, Mersin	1990
Nevin Yanıt Athletics Complex	Yenişehir, Mersin	2010
Servet Tazegül Arena	Yenişehir, Mersin	2013
Seyfi Alanya Sports Hall	Yenişehir, Mersin	1997
Taurus Municipal Stadium	Toroslar, Mersin	
Tevfik Sırrı Gür Stadium	Yenişehir, Mersin	1958
Toroslar Bocce Facility	Toroslar, Mersin	2013

Most of the above venues were used in 2013 Mediterranean Games. Tevfik Sırrı Gür Stadium is the home of Mersin İdmanyurdu football team and Edip Buran Sports hall is the home of Mersin Büyükşehir women's and Mersin Büyükşehir men's basketball teams.

== Gallery ==
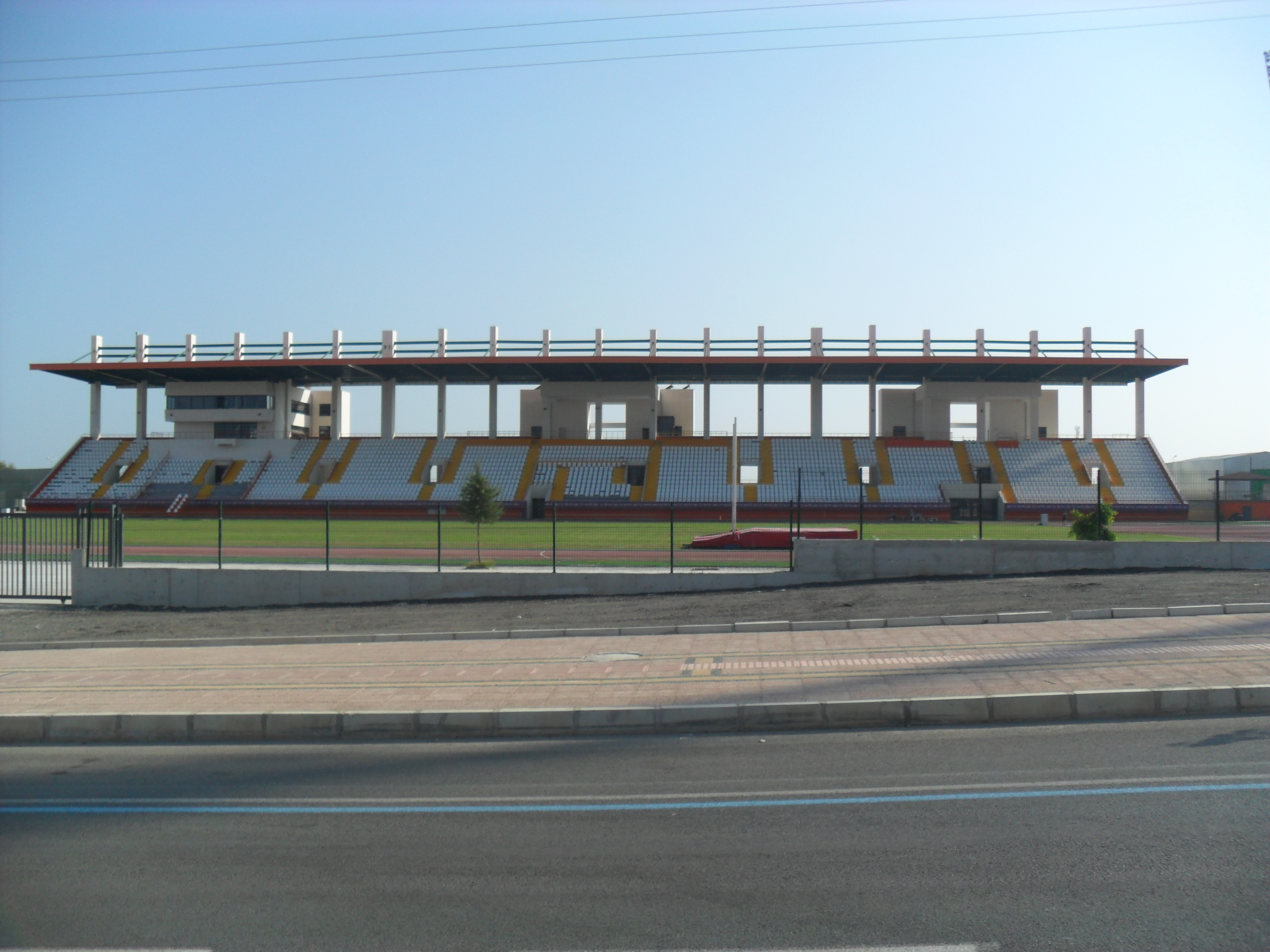
Nevin Yanıt Athletics Complex

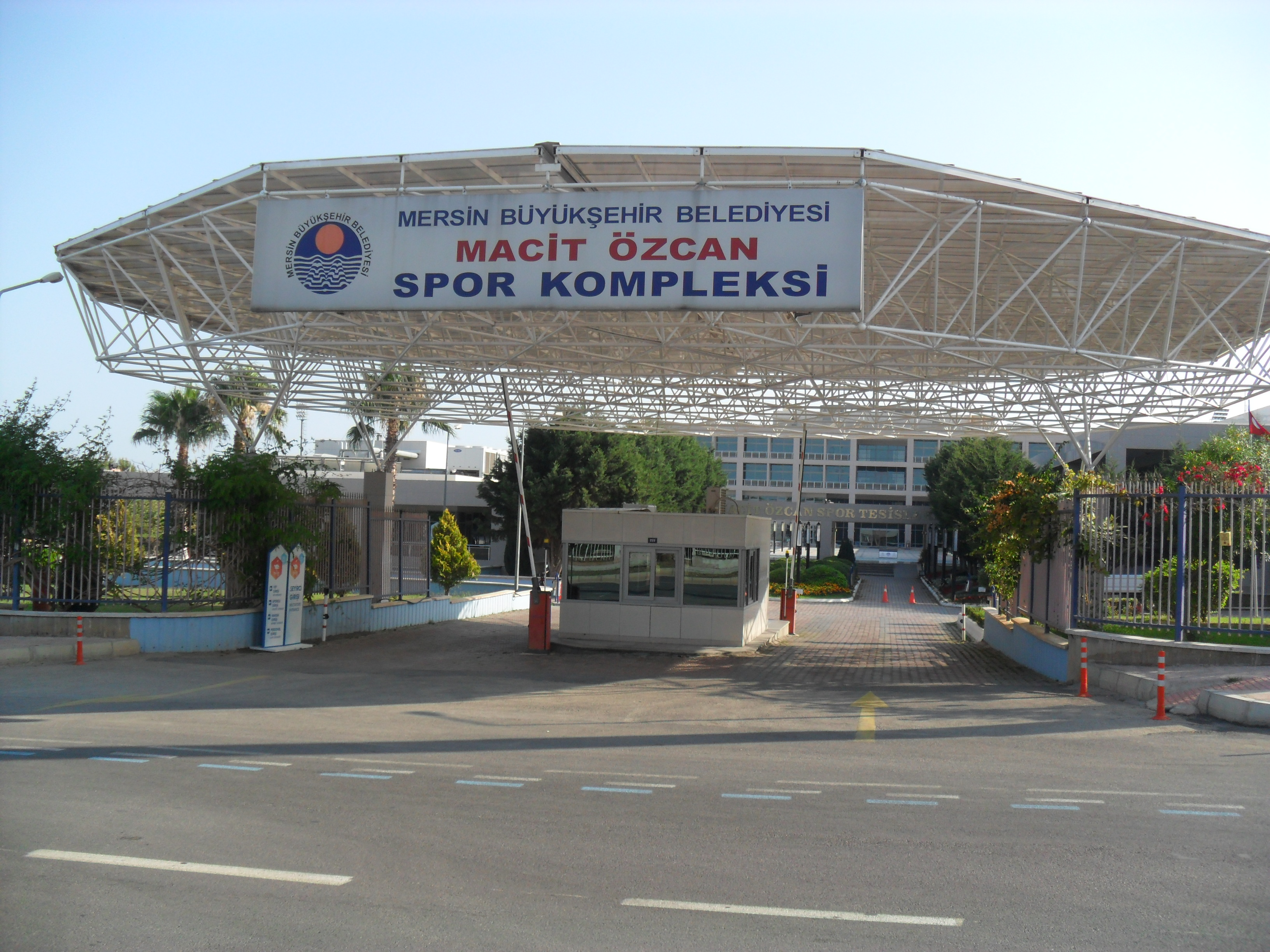
Macit Özcan Sports Complex

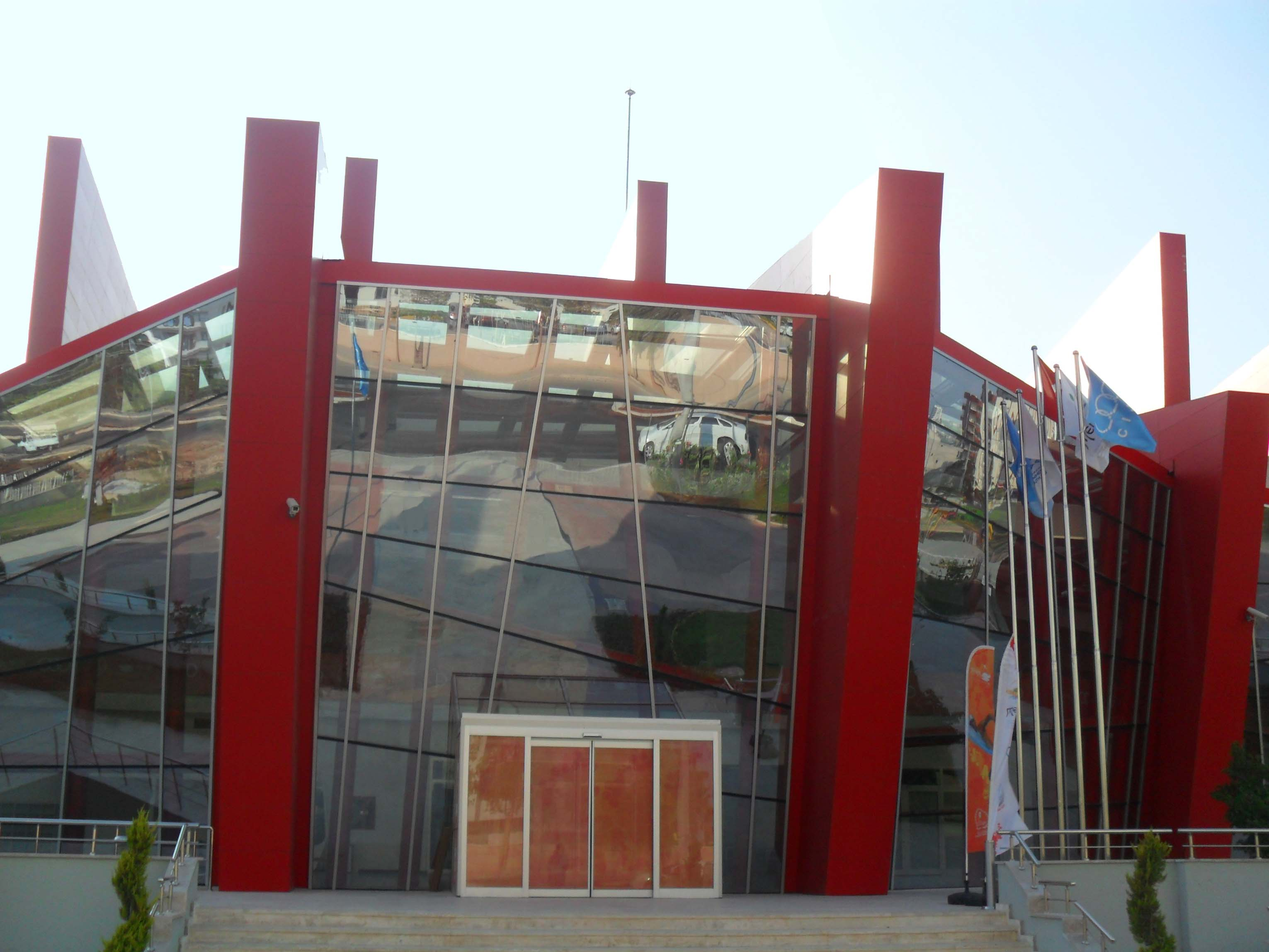
Mersin Olympic Swimming Pool

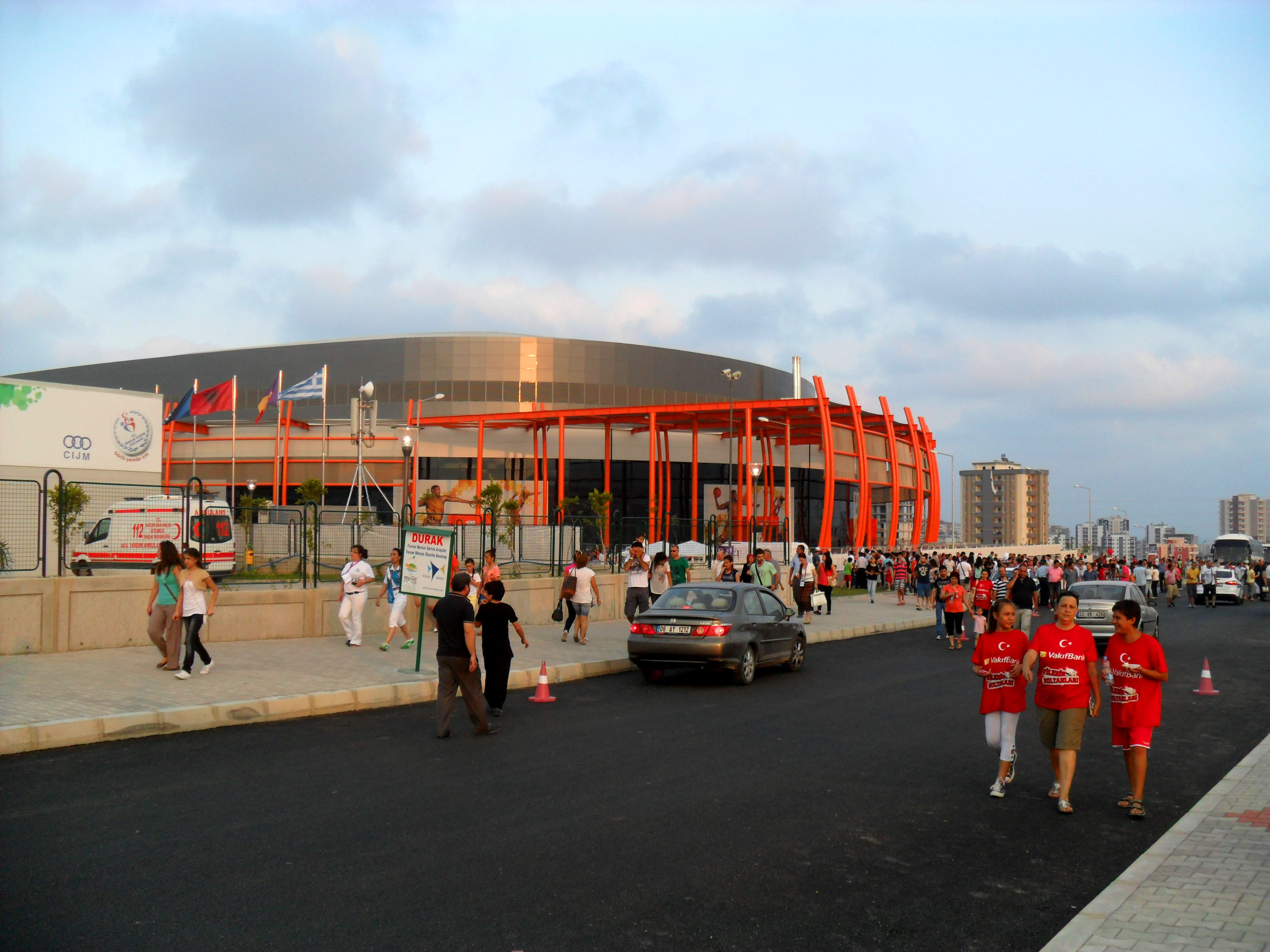
Servet Tazegül Arena

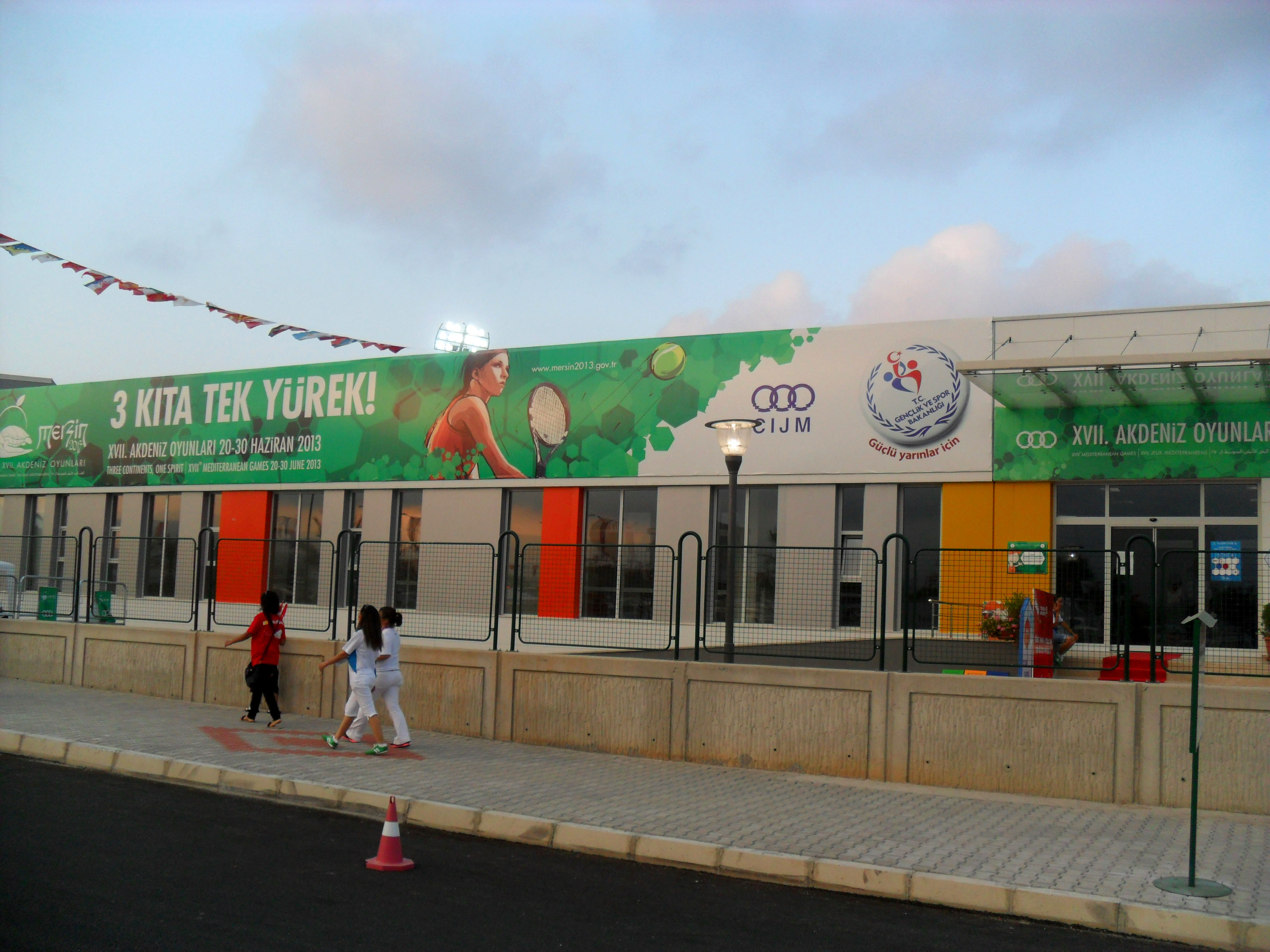
Mersin Tennis Complex

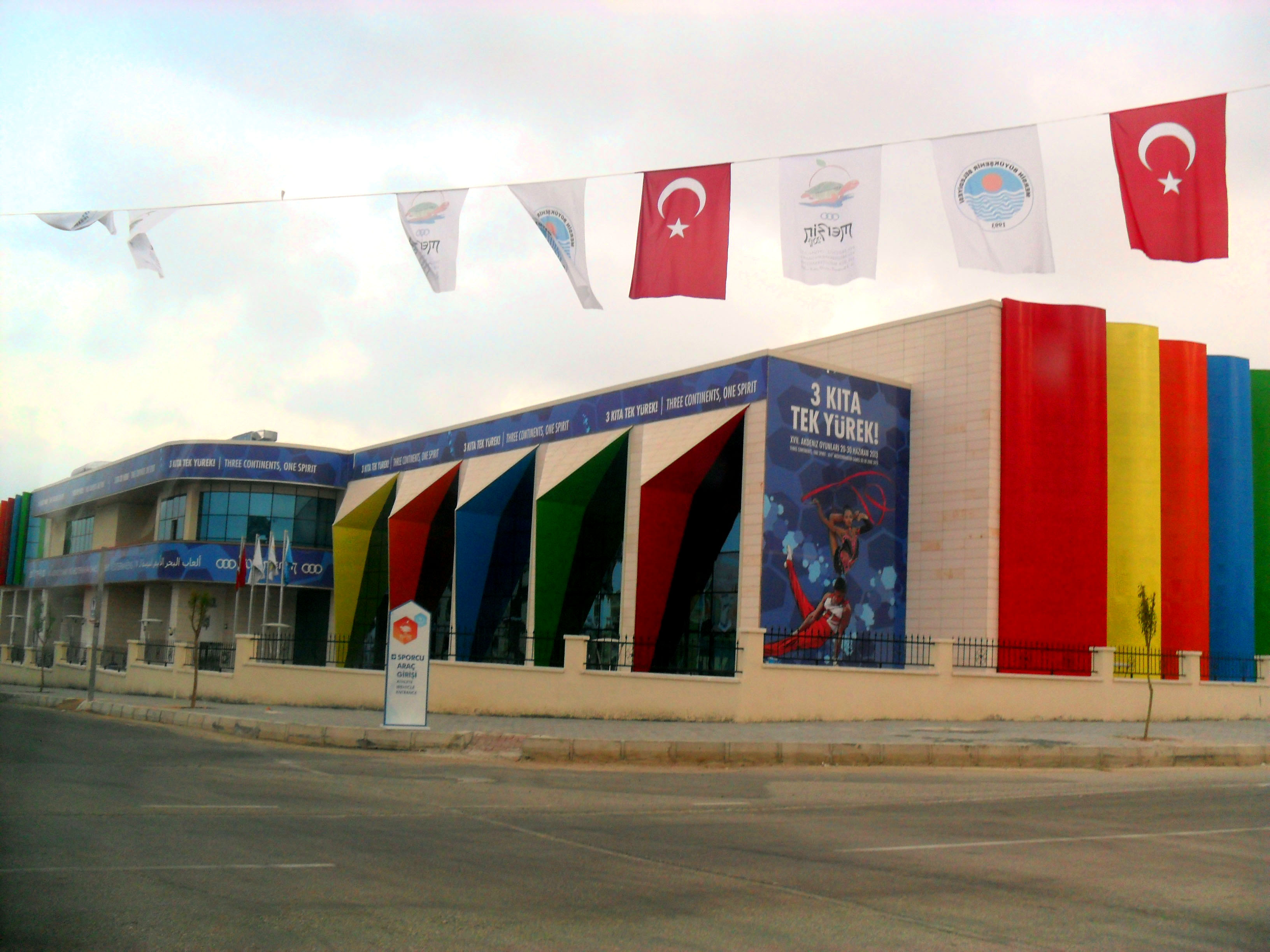
Mersin Gymnastics Hall

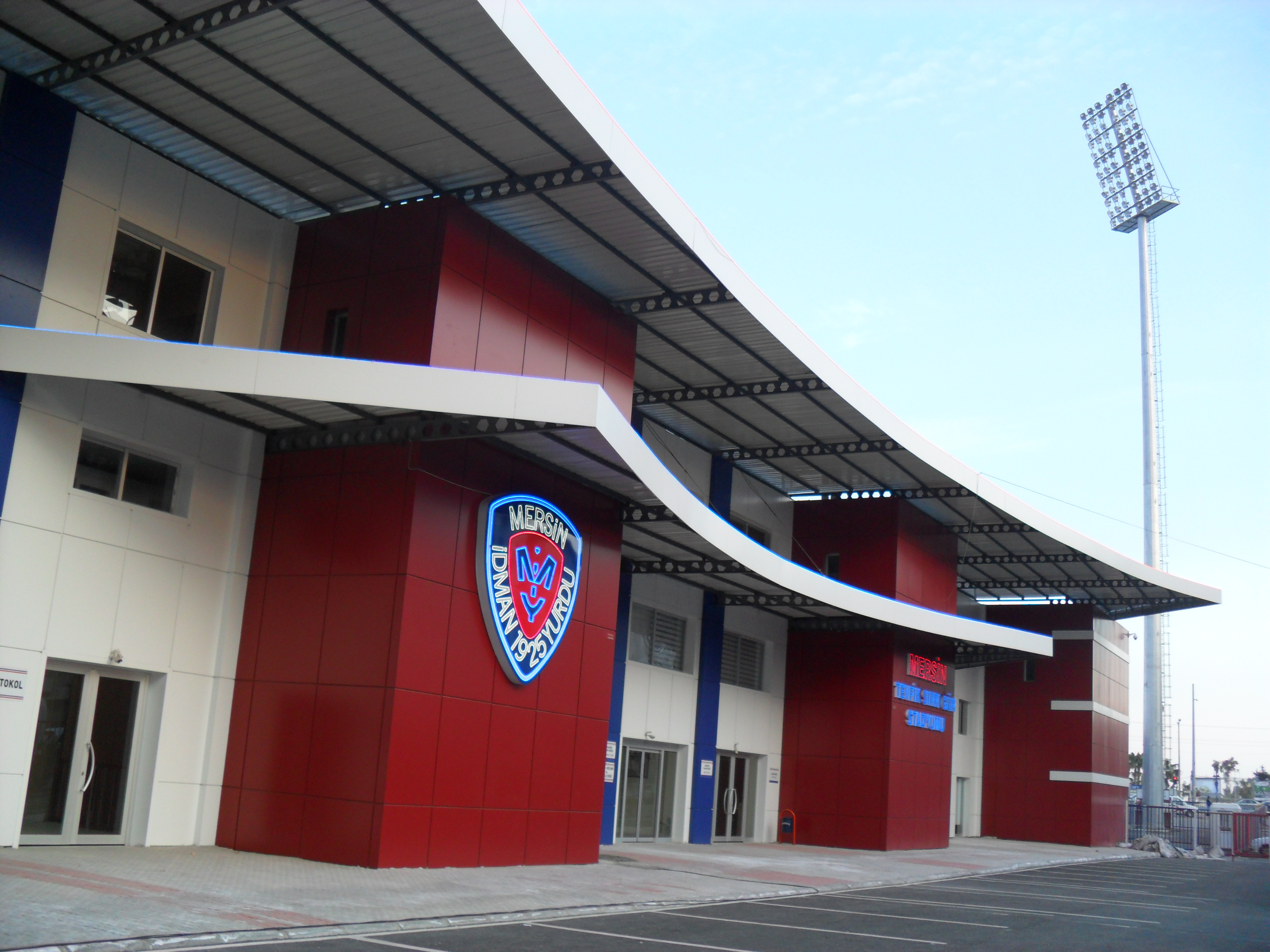
Tevfik Sırrı Gür Stadium
