= Rhythmic gymnastics at the 2013 Mediterranean Games – Women's individual all-around =

The Women's rhythmic individual all-around competition at the 2013 Mediterranean Games in Mersin, Turkey. The event will be held at the Mersin Gymnastics Hall on 29–30 June.

== Competition format ==
The competition consisted of a qualification round and a final round. The top ten gymnasts in the qualification round advance to the final round. In each round, the gymnasts perform four routines (ball, hoop, clubs, and ribbon), with the scores added to give a total.

== Schedule ==
All times are Eastern European Summer Time (UTC+3)

Date	Time	Round
Saturday, 29 June 2013	11:00	Qualification
Sunday, 30 June 2013	11:00	Final

== Qualification ==
Position	Gymnast	Ball	Hoop	Clubs	Ribbon	Total	Notes
1	Carolina Rodríguez (ESP)	17.567	17.383	17.517	17.033	69.500	Q
2	Kseniya Moustafaeva (FRA)	17.400	17.217	17.000	17.100	68.717	Q
3	Federica Febbo (ITA)	16.967	17.100	17.050	17.050	68.167	Q
4	Julieta Cantaluppi (ITA)	16.700	17.183	17.150	16.917	67.950	Q
5	Natalia Garcia (ESP)	16.983	17.017	16.833	16.950	67.783	Q
6	Varvara Filiou (GRE)	15.450	17.317	17.450	16.800	67.017	Q
7	Zeynep Kusem (TUR)	15.650	15.900	15.733	15.583	62.866	Q
8	Burcin Neziroglu (TUR)	15.200	16.217	14.883	14.867	61.167	Q
9	Giulia Di Luca (ITA)	15.933	14.067	15.967	15.150	61.117	Q
10	Sara Kragulj (SLO)	15.667	15.550	14.150	14.767	60.134	Q
11	Heba Elbourini (EGY)	15.167	14.950	14.350	14.733	59.200	
12	Kyriaki Alevrogianni (GRE)	13.850	15.150	14.183	15.683	58.866	
13	Yasmine Rostom (EGY)	15.017	15.567	13.967	14.267	58.818	
14	Ekin Guler (TUR)	14.233	15.050	14.933	14.383	58.599	
15	Lucille Chalopin (FRA)	13.417	14.683	15.117	14.350	57.567	
16	Themida Christodoulidou (CYP)	15.317	14.017	13.483	14.633	57.450	
17	Sara Rostom (EGY)	14.633	14.050	14.567	13.283	56.533	
18	Gillian Leopold (FRA)	14.750	12.983	14.733	11.850	54.316	
19	Fiona Pallarés (AND)	12.833	10.750	11.583	11.217	46.383	

Giulia di Luca of Italy finished in ninth position but did not qualify because a country can only enter two athletes in final.

== Final ==
Position	Gymnast	Ball	Hoop	Clubs	Ribbon	Total	Notes
1st place, gold medalist(s)	Carolina Rodríguez (ESP)	17.400	17.417	17.600	17.550	69.967	
2nd place, silver medalist(s)	Varvara Filiou (GRE)	17.400	17.267	17.383	16.967	69.017	
3rd place, bronze medalist(s)	Kseniya Moustafaeva (FRA)	17.117	17.233	17.000	17.117	68.467	
4	Federica Febbo (ITA)	17.067	17.000	17.050	17.033	68.150	
5	Julieta Cantaluppi (ITA)	16.983	16.983	16.917	16.900	67.783	
6	Natalia Garcia (ESP)	16.733	16.500	16.433	16.483	66.149	
7	Burcin Neziroglu (TUR)	15.217	15.783	14.933	15.450	61.383	
8	Zeynep Kusem (TUR)	14.983	15.700	15.083	14.900	60.666	
9	Sara Kragulj (SLO)	14.433	13.867	14.833	14.800	57.933	
10	Heba Elbourini (EGY)	13.983	15.133	14.800	13.433	57.349	
