= Andorra at the Mediterranean Games =

- IOC code: AND
- NOC: Andorran Olympic Committee
- Medals: Gold 0 Silver 0 Bronze 1 Total 1

Mediterranean Games appearances (overview)
- 2001; 2005; 2009; 2013; 2018; 2022; 2026

Andorra began taking part in the quadrennial Mediterranean Games in 2001.

== Overview ==
=== By event ===
Games	Athletes	Gold	Silver	Bronze	Total	Rank
1951–1997	Did not participate					
2001 Tunis	9	0	0	0	0	—
2005 Almería	Did not participate					
2009 Pescara	13	0	0	0	0	—
2013 Mersin		0	0	0	0	—
2018 Tarragona	34	0	0	0	0	—
2022 Oran	11	0	0	0	0	—
2026 Taranto	9	0	0	1	1	25
Total		0	0	1	1	—

== See also ==
- Andorra at the Olympics
- Andorra at the Paralympics
