= Rhythmic gymnastics at the 2013 Mediterranean Games =

The rhythmic gymnastics competitions at the 2013 Mediterranean Games in Mersin took place between 29 June and 30 June at the Mersin Gymnastics Hall.

Athletes competed in 1 event, women's individual all-around.

== Medal summary ==
Event	Gold	Silver	Bronze
Individual all-around	Carolina Rodríguez; Spain	Varvara Filiou; Greece	Kseniya Moustafaeva; France

== Participating nations ==
Ten nations have applied to compete in rhythmic gymnastics. Lebanon has applied, but didn't send any gymnast.

- Andorra
- Cyprus
- Egypt
- France
- Greece
- Italy
- Slovenia
- Spain
- Turkey
