= Andorra at the 2018 Mediterranean Games =

- IOC code: AND
- NOC: Andorran Olympic Committee

in Tarragona
- Competitors: 32 in 13 sports
- Flag bearer: Mónica Ramírez
- Medals: Gold 0 Silver 0 Bronze 0 Total 0

Mediterranean Games appearances (overview)
- 2001; 2005; 2009; 2013; 2018; 2022

Andorra competed at the 2018 Mediterranean Games in Tarragona, Spain from the 22 June to 1 July 2018.

Andorra was represented by 32 athletes in 13 sports.

== Athletics ==
Men
Track events

| Athlete | Event | Semifinals | | Final | |
| Athlete | Event | Result | Rank | Result | Rank |
|---|---|---|---|---|---|
| Carles Gómez | 1500 m | 3:56.95 | 15 | Did not advance | |

== Basketball 3X3 ==
=== Men's tournament ===
| Athlete | Event | Group matches | | | Quarterfinals | Semifinals | Final / BM | |
| Athlete | Event | Opposition Score | Opposition Score | Rank | Opposition Score | Opposition Score | Opposition Score | Rank |
|---|---|---|---|---|---|---|---|---|
| Eduard Fernandez; Eric Marti; Jordi Moline; Albert Pons | Men's tournament | Serbia; L 10–22 | North Macedonia; L 17–20 | 3 | Did not advance | | | |

=== Women's tournament ===
| Athlete | Event | Group matches | | | | | Semifinals | Final / BM | |
| Athlete | Event | Opposition Score | Opposition Score | Opposition Score | Opposition Score | Rank | Opposition Score | Opposition Score | Rank |
|---|---|---|---|---|---|---|---|---|---|
| Cristina Andres; Claudia Brunet; Claudia Guri; Anna Mañà | Women's tournament | Spain; L 5–22 | Greece; L 12–16 | Portugal; L 5–14 | Slovenia; W 21–19 (OT) | 4 | Did not advance | | |

== Boules ==
Pétanque

| Athlete | Event | Preliminary round | | | | Semifinals | Final / BM | |
| Athlete | Event | Round 1 | Rank | Round 2 | Rank | Opposition Score | Opposition Score | Rank |
|---|---|---|---|---|---|---|---|---|
| Frederic Breton | Men's precision throw | 18 | 21 | Did not advance | | | | |
| Bruno Santmann | Men's precision throw | 20 | 17 | Did not advance | | | | |

| Athlete | Event | Group stage | | | | | Semifinals | Final / BM | |
| Athlete | Event | Opposition Score | Opposition Score | Opposition Score | Opposition Score | Rank | Opposition Score | Opposition Score | Rank |
|---|---|---|---|---|---|---|---|---|---|
| Frederic Breton; Bruno Santmann | Men's doubles | Spain (ESP); L 3–13 | Morocco (MAR); L 2–13 | Italy (ITA); L 6–12 | Monaco (MON); W 13–3 | 4 | Did not advance | | |

== Cycling ==
Men

| Athlete | Event | Time | Rank |
|---|---|---|---|
| Òscar Cabanas | Men's road race | 4:03:13 | 37 |
| Òscar Cabanas | Men's time trial | 33:46.77 | 19 |
| Marc Gasa | Men's road race | DNF | |
| Samuel Ponce | Men's road race | 4:03:13 | 39 |
| Samuel Ponce | Men's time trial | 35:04.19 | 20 |

== Golf ==
| Athlete | Event | Round 1 | Round 2 | Round 3 | Round 4 | Total | | |
| Athlete | Event | Score | Score | Score | Score | Score | Par | Rank |
|---|---|---|---|---|---|---|---|---|
| Ramon Armengol | Men's individual | 75 | 79 | 71 | 78 | 303 | +15 | 28 |
| Kevin Esteve | Men's individual | 75 | 77 | 74 | 70 | 296 | +8 | 21 |
| Julia Vassort | Men's individual | 77 | 80 | 82 | 81 | 320 | +32 | 36 |
| Ramon Armengol; Kevin Esteve; Julia Vassort | Men's team | 75; 75; ~~77~~ | 79; 77; ~~80~~ | 71; 74; ~~82~~ | 78; 70; ~~81~~ | 599 | | 11 |
| Maria Creus | Women's individual | 76 | 75 | 81 | 77 | 309 | +21 | 16 |

== Gymnastics ==
Rhythmic gymnastics

| Athlete | Event | Qualification | | | | | | Final | | | | | |
| Athlete | Event | Hoop | Ball | Clubs | Ribbon | Total | Rank | Hoop | Ball | Clubs | Ribbon | Total | Rank |
|---|---|---|---|---|---|---|---|---|---|---|---|---|---|
| Judith Flinch | All-around | 9.800 | 10.850 | 9.450 | 6.750 | 36.850 | 20 | Did not advance | | | | | |
| Jessica Pereira | All-around | 8.550 | 3.400 | 9.300 | 7.900 | 29.150 | 22 | Did not advance | | | | | |
| Andrea Ramos | All-around | 9.300 | 6.850 | 9.650 | 7.450 | 33.250 | 21 | Did not advance | | | | | |

== Judo ==
| Athlete | Event | Round of 16 | Quarterfinals | Semifinals | Repechage 1 | Repechage 2 | Final / BM | |
| Athlete | Event | Opposition Result | Opposition Result | Opposition Result | Opposition Result | Opposition Result | Opposition Result | Rank |
|---|---|---|---|---|---|---|---|---|
| Karim Nsir | Men's 90 kg | Snoussi (TUN); L 00–10 | Did not advance | | | | | |
| Alda Babi | Women's 52 kg | Moussa (ALG); L 00–10 | Did not advance | | | | | |

== Karate ==
Women

| Athlete | Event | Round of 16 | Quarterfinals | Semifinals | Repechage | Final / BM | |
| Athlete | Event | Opposition Result | Opposition Result | Opposition Result | Opposition Result | Opposition Result | Rank |
|---|---|---|---|---|---|---|---|
| Sandra Herver | −68 kg | Mojsovska (MKD); L 0–8 | Did not advance | | | | |

== Sailing ==
Men

| Athlete | Event | Race | | | | | | | | | | | Net points | Final rank |
| Athlete | Event | 1 | 2 | 3 | 4 | 5 | 6 | 7 | 8 | 9 | 10 | 11 | Net points | Final rank |
|---|---|---|---|---|---|---|---|---|---|---|---|---|---|---|
| Gorka Arajol | Laser | 18 | 19 | 16 | 18 | 3 | ~~20~~ | 13 | 13 | 8 | 17 | 8 | 133 | 16 |

== Shooting ==
Women

| Athlete | Event | Qualification | | Final | |
| Athlete | Event | Points | Rank | Points | Rank |
|---|---|---|---|---|---|
| Esther Barrugués | 10 metre air rifle | 594.7 | 22 | Did not advance | |

== Swimming ==
Men

| Athlete | Event | Heats | | Final | |
| Athlete | Event | Time | Rank | Time | Rank |
|---|---|---|---|---|---|
| Bernat Lomero | 50 m butterfly | 25.21 | 14 | Did not advance | |
| Patrick Pelegrina | 50 m breaststroke | 29.86 | 18 | Did not advance | |

Women

| Athlete | Event | Heats | | Final | |
| Athlete | Event | Time | Rank | Time | Rank |
|---|---|---|---|---|---|
| Mónica Ramírez | 50 m freestyle | 27.29 | 19 | Did not advance | |
| Mónica Ramírez | 100 m backstroke | 1:06.42 | 9 | Did not advance | |
| Nàdia Tudó | 200 m freestyle | 2:11.72 | 18 | Did not advance | |

== Taekwondo ==
Men

| Athlete | Event | Round of 16 | Quarterfinals | Semifinals | Final | |
| Athlete | Event | Opposition Result | Opposition Result | Opposition Result | Opposition Result | Rank |
|---|---|---|---|---|---|---|
| Jorge González | Men's 80 kg | Mahboubi (MAR); L 5–25 (PTG) | Did not advance | | | |

== Tennis ==
Men

| Athlete | Event | Round of 32 | Round of 16 | Quarterfinals | Semifinals | Final / BM | |
| Athlete | Event | Opposition Score | Opposition Score | Opposition Score | Opposition Score | Opposition Score | Rank |
|---|---|---|---|---|---|---|---|
| Joan Bautista Poux | Singles | Stergiou (GRE); L 2–6, 4–6 | Did not advance | | | | |
