= Water skiing at the 2013 Mediterranean Games =

The water skiing competitions at the 2013 Mediterranean Games in Mersin took place between 21 June and 23 June at the Mersin Atatürk Park.

Athletes competed in 2 events. Tricks and wakeboard competitions were not held because too few nations applied.

== Medal summary ==
=== Events ===
Event	Gold	Silver	Bronze
Men's slalom	Carlo Allais; Italy	Thibault Dailland; France	Matteo Luzzeri; Italy
Women's slalom	Manon Costard; France	Clementine Lucine; France	Beatrice Ianni; Italy

=== Medal table ===
Key:

Rank	Nation	Gold	Silver	Bronze	Total
1	France	1	2	0	3
2	Italy	1	0	2	3
Totals (2 entries)		2	2	2	6
