= CNR Yenişehir Exhibition Center =

Exhibition area in Mersin, Turkey

CNR Yenişehir Exhibition Center CNR Yenişehir Fuar Merkezi
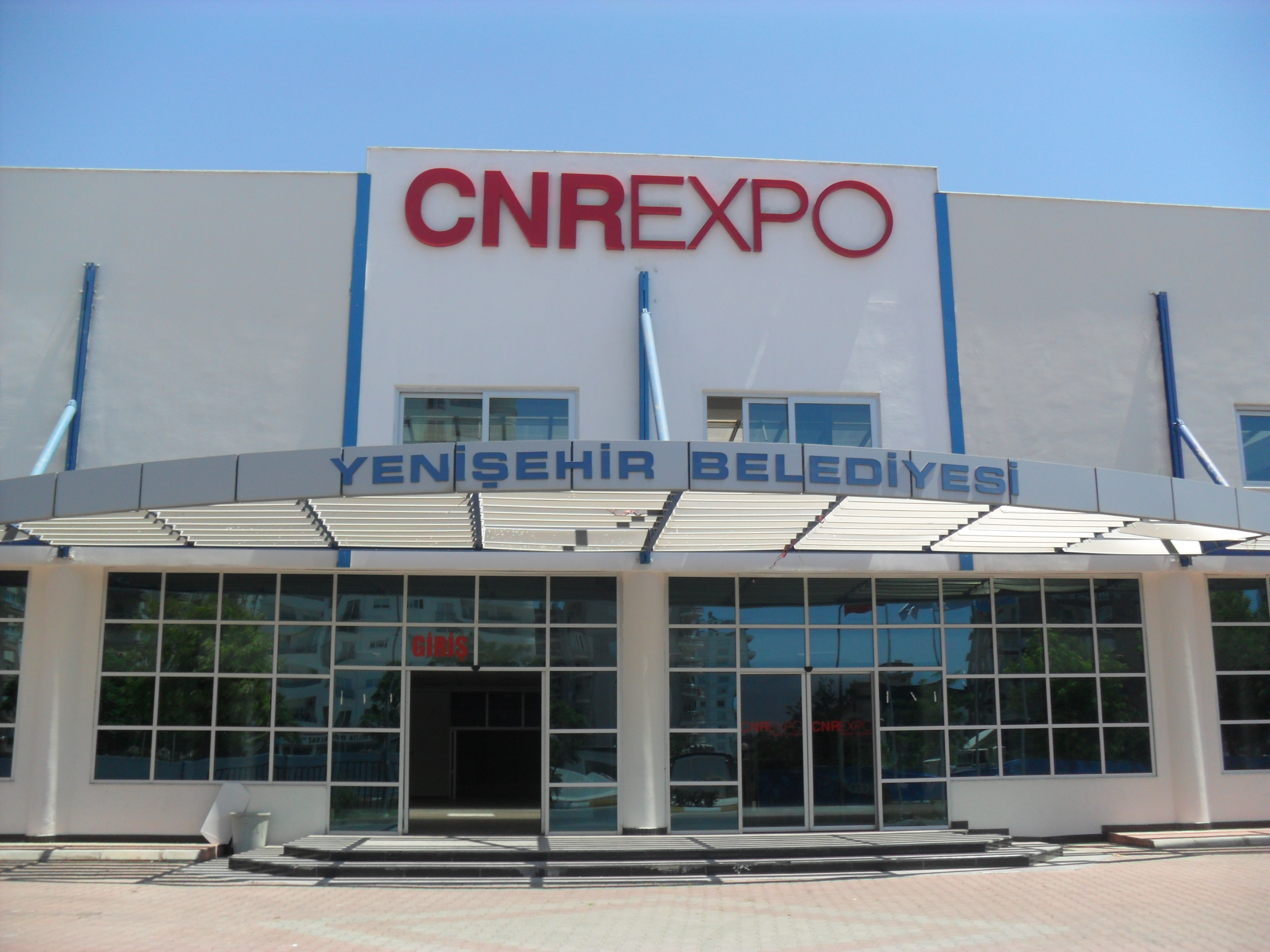
- Interactive map of CNR Yenişehir Exhibition Center; CNR Yenişehir Fuar Merkezi
- Former names: Mersin Yenişehir Exhibition Center
- Location: Yenişehir, Mersin, Turkey
- Coordinates: 36°46′N 34°33′E
- Owner: CNR Expo Co.
- Events: Trade fair, indoor sports

Construction
- Opened: October 18, 2007; 18 years ago

The CNR Yenişehir Exhibition Center (Turkish: CNR Yenişehir Fuar Merkezi), formerly Mersin Yenişehir Exhibition Center (Turkish: Mersin Yenişehir Fuar Merkezi), is an exhibition area in Mersin, Turkey.

== Geography ==
At 36°46′N 34°33′E the exhibition area is situated at the extreme west of Yenişehir second level municipality. It is to the north of Gazi Mustafa Kemal Boulevard.

== History ==
The fairground was constructed by Yenişehir Municipality, and opened on October 18, 2007. It was operated by Forza Exhibition Co. until 51% of the company's stock was purchased by CNR Expo Co. on March 1, 2012, which is the current operator. Although CNR runs an exhibition center in İstanbul Mersin is the first exhibition center of CNR in Anatolia. In the press conference held after the handover, Ceyda Erem the chairperson of the executive board said that the exhibition center will not only attract companies from the Mideast and Mediterranean but they also plan to bring European companies to Mersin.

== Details ==
The total area of the fairground is 72,000 m^{2} (780,000 sq ft) while 32,000 m^{2} (340,000 sq ft) are covered. It consists of three exhibition halls, 1,600 m^{2} (17,000 sq ft) foyer, five conference rooms, 500 m^{2} (5,400 sq ft) art gallery, two cafés, a restaurant for 200 guests and 20,000 m^{2} (220,000 sq ft) parking lot.

== Major events ==
The Hall A of the exhibition center hosted fencing on June 22–23 and table tennis events on June 25–29 during the 2013 Mediterranean Games. Wrestling competitions of the Games were held in the Hall C between June 22 and 27.
