= Mersin Volleyball Hall =

Sports hall in Mersin, Turkey

- Mersin Voleybol Salonu (Turkish)
- Interactive map of Mersin Volleyball Hall
- Location: Yenişehir, Mersin, Turkey
- Coordinates: 36.849488°N 34.62501°E
- Capacity: 1,000

Construction
- Opened: June 10, 2013; 13 years ago

The Mersin Volleyball Hall (Turkish: Mersin Voleybol Salonu) is an indoor sports hall for volleyball events at Yenişehir district of Mersin, Turkey.

The venue was constructed for the 2013 Mediterranean Games within 248 working days. It has a covered area of 5,000 m^{2} (54,000 sq ft). Seating capacity of the sports hall is 1,000. It went in service on June 10, 2013 during two friendship matches played between the local men's and women's volleyball teams.

The sports hall hosted the men's volleyball tournament events of the 2013 Mediterranean Games from June 21 to 27 while the final matches were played at the much bigger Servet Tazegül Arena.
