= Erdemli Shooting Range =

Firing range in Mersin, Turkey

Erdemli Shooting Range Erdemli Atış Poligonu
- Owner: Mersin Youth Service and Sports Directoriate
- Capacity: 1,550

Construction
- Opened: 2013; 13 years ago

The Erdemli Shooting Range (Turkish: Erdemli Atış Poligonu) is a firing range located in Erdemli district of Mersin Province, Turkey. It was constructed for the 2013 Mediterranean Games.

The venue is built on a ground of 130,000 m^{2} (1,400,000 sq ft), and has a seating capacity of 1,550. The indoor firing ranges of 10 m, 25 m and 50 m for pistol and rifle cover an area of 35,000 m^{2} (380,000 sq ft). It is also suitable for skeet and trap shootings. It hosted the shooting events of 2013 Mediterranean Games on June 23–28.
