= Andorra at the 2009 Mediterranean Games =

- IOC code: AND
- NOC: Andorran Olympic Committee

in Pescara
- Medals Ranked th: Gold 0 Silver 0 Bronze 0 Total 0

Mediterranean Games appearances (overview)
- 2001; 2005; 2009; 2013; 2018; 2022

Andorra competed at the 2009 Mediterranean Games held in Pescara, Italy.

== Athletics ==
Women

Athlete	Event	Semifinal		Final	
Athlete	Event	Result	Rank	Result	Rank
Montserrat Pujol	200 m				
Montserrat Pujol	100 m				
Montserrat Pujol	Long jump				

== Shooting ==
Men

Athlete	Event	Qualification		Final	
Athlete	Event	Score	Rank	Score	Rank
Francesc Repiso Romero	Trap				
Joan Tomas Roca	Trap				

== Swimming ==
Women

Athlete	Events	Heat		Final	
Athlete	Events	Time	Rank	Time	Rank
Monica Ramirez Abella	50 m backstroke	31.73	17	Did not advance	
Monica Ramirez Abella	100 m backstroke				
Monica Ramirez Abella	200 m backstroke				

Men

Athlete	Events	Heat		Final	
Athlete	Events	Time	Rank	Time	Rank
Hocine Haciane	100 m breaststroke	1:03.92	15	Did not advance	
Hocine Haciane	100 m butterfly				
Hocine Haciane	200 m breaststroke				
