= Varvara Filiou =

Greek rhythmic gymnast

- Alternative name: Barbara Filiou
- Nickname: Ms. Barbie
- Born: 29 December 1994 (age 31) Attiki, Greece
- Height: 165 cm (5 ft 5 in)

Gymnastics career
- Discipline: Rhythmic gymnastics
- Country represented: Greece; (2008 - 2016)
- Club: Olympiakos rithmos
- Gym: Novogorsk
- Head coach: Evgenia Gianîtsopoulou
- Assistant coach: Larisa Sidorova
- Former coaches: Aliya Garayeva, Evmorphina Dona
- Choreographer: Ioannis Martos, Irina Zenovka, Lali Dolidze
- World ranking: 28 (2016 Season); 21 (2015 Season); 18 (2014 Season); 20 (2013 Season); 27 (2012 Season); 28 (2011 Season)
Medal record
Representing Greece
Rhythmic Gymnastics
Mediterranean Games
Silver medal – second place	2013 Mersin	All-around

Varvara Filiou (Greek: Βαρβάρα Φίλιου; born December 29, 1994, in Attiki, Greece) is a retired Greek individual rhythmic gymnast and coach. She is an eight-time (2008–2016) Greek National All-around Champion. She is one of Greece's most successful rhythmic gymnasts.

== Personal life ==
Filiou's mother Eleonora Marinova is a former Bulgarian rhythmic gymnast and also competed at national level in Greece gymnastics. Filiou took up rhythmic gymnastics at age seven.

In 2022, she gave birth to a baby girl named Evgenia (born 16 April).

== Career ==
Filiou has been a member of the Greek National gymnastics team since 2008 and made her senior debut in 2010. She spends part-time of her training season in Novogorsk in Moscow, Russia.

=== 2010-2012 ===
She has competed at the 2010 World Championships in Moscow, Russia, where she finished 41st in qualifications and at the 2011 World Championships in Montpellier, France where she qualified for the All-around finals and finished 23rd. She won the silver in all-around at the 2012 Kalamata Cup ahead of Ganna Rizatdinova. She finished 13th in all-around at the 2012 European Championships. Filiou missed qualifying for the 2012 Olympics finishing 11th in London Gymnastics Olympics Test Event.

=== 2013 ===
In 2013, she competed in the 2013 World Cup and 2013 Grand Prix Series. Filiou started her season competing at the 2013 Moscow Grand Prix. She won bronze in all-around at the 2013 Kalamata Cup. At the 2013 European Championships in Vienna, Austria, Filiou qualified to her first event final in ribbon where she finished 8th. She finished 10th in all-around at the 2013 Summer Universiade in Kazan, Russia. She won the silver medal in all-around at the 2013 Mediterranean Games. She then competed at the 2013 World Championships where she qualified to her first event final in ribbon finishing 4th behind Belarusian Melitina Staniouta. In the All-around final, Filiou finished 8th at Worlds behind of Ukrainian Alina Maksymenko.

=== 2014 ===
In 2014, Filiou started her season competing at the 2014 Holon Grand Prix where she finished 13th in the all-around. On May 3–5, Filiou then competed at the 2014 Kalamata Cup and won the all-around silver behind Melitina Staniouta. Filiou then competed at the 2014 Corbeil-Essonnes World Cup and finished 6th in all-around behind Katsiaryna Halkina and qualified to 3 event finals. On June 10–15, Filiou competed at the 2014 European Championships and finished 16th in all-around. On August 8–10, Filiou finished 6th in all-around at the 2014 Sofia World Cup and qualified to all 4 event finals for the first time in her World Cup series competition. On September 5–7, at the 2014 World Cup Final in Kazan, Russia, after a series of errors in all 4 apparatus left Filiou finishing 32nd in all-around finals. On September 22–28, Filiou competed at the 2014 World Championships where she finished 20th in the all-around finals.

=== 2015 ===
In 2015, Filiou began the season competing at the 2015 Moscow Grand Prix finishing 22nd in the all-around. On March 21–22, Filiou competed at the 2015 Thiais Grand Prix finishing 11th in the all-around behind Canada's Patricia Bezzoubenko. On April 10–12, Filiou finished 15th in the all-around at the 2015 Pesaro World Cup. Filiou competed at the 2015 Holon Grand Prix finishing 17th in all-around. On June 15–21, Filiou competed at the inaugural 2015 European Games where she finished 14th in the all-around. In August, Filiou finished 17th in the all-around at the 2015 Sofia World Cup. At the 2015 World Cup Final in Kazan, Filiou finished 13th in the all-around and qualified to ribbon finals finishing in 6th place. On September 9–13, Filiou competed at the 2015 World Championships in Stuttgart where she qualified to 1 apparatus final finishing 8th in ribbon (17.633). In the All-around finals, Filiou finished in 14th place with a total of 69.449 points.

=== 2016: Olympics ===
In 2016 Season, Filiou competed at the 30th Thiais Grand Prix event in Paris, where she finished 17th in the all-around. On April 1–3, Filiou competed at the 2016 Pesaro World Cup where she finished a disappointing 37th in the all-around. On May 27–29, Filiou finished 8th in the all-around at the 2016 Sofia World Cup with a total of 70.350 points, she qualified to 3 apparatus finals. On June 17–19, Filiou competed at the 2016 European Championships where she finished in 14th place. On July 8–10, Filiou then finished 10th in the all-around at the 2016 Kazan World Cup with a total of 70.950 points - a personal best score for Filiou, she also qualified in the hoop finals finishing in 7th place. On August 19–20, Filiou competed at the 2016 Summer Olympics held in Rio de Janeiro, Brazil. She finished 15th in the rhythmic gymnastics individual all-around qualifications and did not advance into the top 10 finals.

As of 2018, she serves as coach to Indian rhythmic gymnast, Meghna Reddy Gundlapally.

== Routine music information ==
Year	Apparatus	Music title
2016	Hoop	Someone else by Allegro Feat. L.V., Fresh Game & Cokni O'Dire
2016	Ball	O Thanos Tou Tavrou (The Death of the Bull) by Stavros Lantsias
2016	Clubs	Zorbas Dance - Sirtaki by Mikis Theodorakis
2016	Ribbon	I Feel Good by James Brown
2015	Hoop	Someone else by Allegro Feat. L.V., Fresh Game & Cokni O'Dire
2015	Ball	Pied Dans La Main by Sylvain Durand
2015	Clubs	Zorbas Dance - Sirtaki by Mikis Theodorakis
2015	Ribbon	I Feel Good by James Brown
2014	Hoop (2nd)	Me Tut Kamav by G-Night
2014	Hoop (1st)	Massive Illusion music by Gazpacho
2014	Ball	Habanera music by Wolf Hoffman
2014	Clubs	Beat Box, Candyall Beat, Liwa Wechi, Tradicion (Pablo Glorious Tribal Mix) music by Various Artists, Carlinhos Brown, Miriam Makeba, Gloria Estefan
2014	Ribbon	Kooza Dance music from Cirque Du Soleil
2013	Hoop	Pigalle (Interlude) music by Patricia Kaas
2013	Ball	Habanera music by Wolf Hoffman
2013	Clubs	Mi Niña Baila (Fandangos de Huelva) music by Jean-Baptiste Marino
2013	Ribbon	Kooza Dance music from Cirque Du Soleil
2012	Hoop	Pigalle (Interlude) music by Patricia Kaas
2012	Ball	Rêve Rouge music from Le Cirque Du Soleil (La Nouba)
2012	Clubs	Mi Niña Baila (Fandangos de Huelva) music by Jean-Baptiste Marino
2012	Ribbon	The Mummy (Soundtrack) by Jerry Goldsmith
2011	Hoop	?
2011	Ball	Rêve Rouge music from Le Cirque Du Soleil (La Nouba)
2011	Clubs	Mi Niña Baila (Fandangos de Huelva) music by Jean-Baptiste Marino
2011	Ribbon	The Mummy (Soundtrack) by Jerry Goldsmith
