= Macit Özcan Sports Complex =

Sports Complex Of Turkey

Macit Özcan Sports Complex Macit Özcan Spor Kompleksi
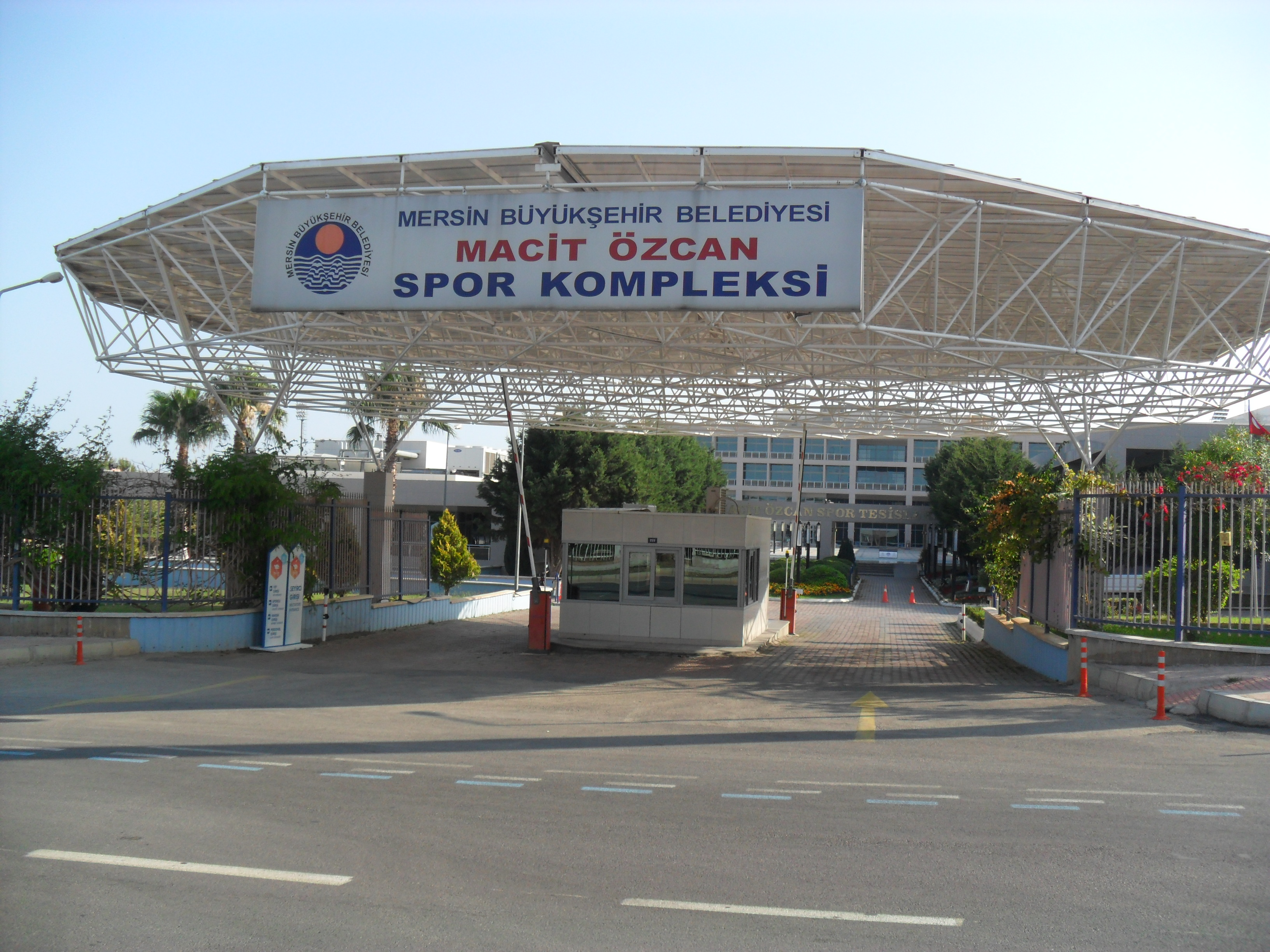
- Interactive map of Macit Özcan Sports Complex; Macit Özcan Spor Kompleksi
- Location: İsmet İnönü Boulevard, Yenişehir, Mersin
- Coordinates: 36°49′N 34°34′E
- Owner: Mersin Metropolitan Municipality

Construction
- Opened: 2008; 17 years ago

The Macit Özcan Sports Complex (Turkish: Macit Özcan Spor Kompleksi) is a multi-sport complex located at Yenişehir district in Mersin, Turkey. It is named after Macit Özcan, the mayor of Greater Mersin.

The complex is situated to the west of İsmet İnönü Boulevard. Its bird's flight distance to Mediterranean Sea coast is about 4.5 km (2.8 mi) and to Müftü River is 2 km (1.2 mi). The Nevin Yanıt Athletics Complex is to the south of Macit Özcan Complex.

Built on an area of 76,000 m^{2} (820,000 sq ft), the complex consists of three football fields, three tennis courts, three basketball courts and one Olympic-size and two smaller swimming pools. There is also an aerobic center and a gymnasium for the visitors in addition to a hotel, a restaurant and a conference hall at the site.

During the 2013 Mediterranean Games, the complex hosted the water polo events on 19–26 June.
