= Mersin Gymnastics Hall =

Sports hall in Mersin, Turkey

Mersin Gymnastics Hall Mersin Cimnastik Salonu
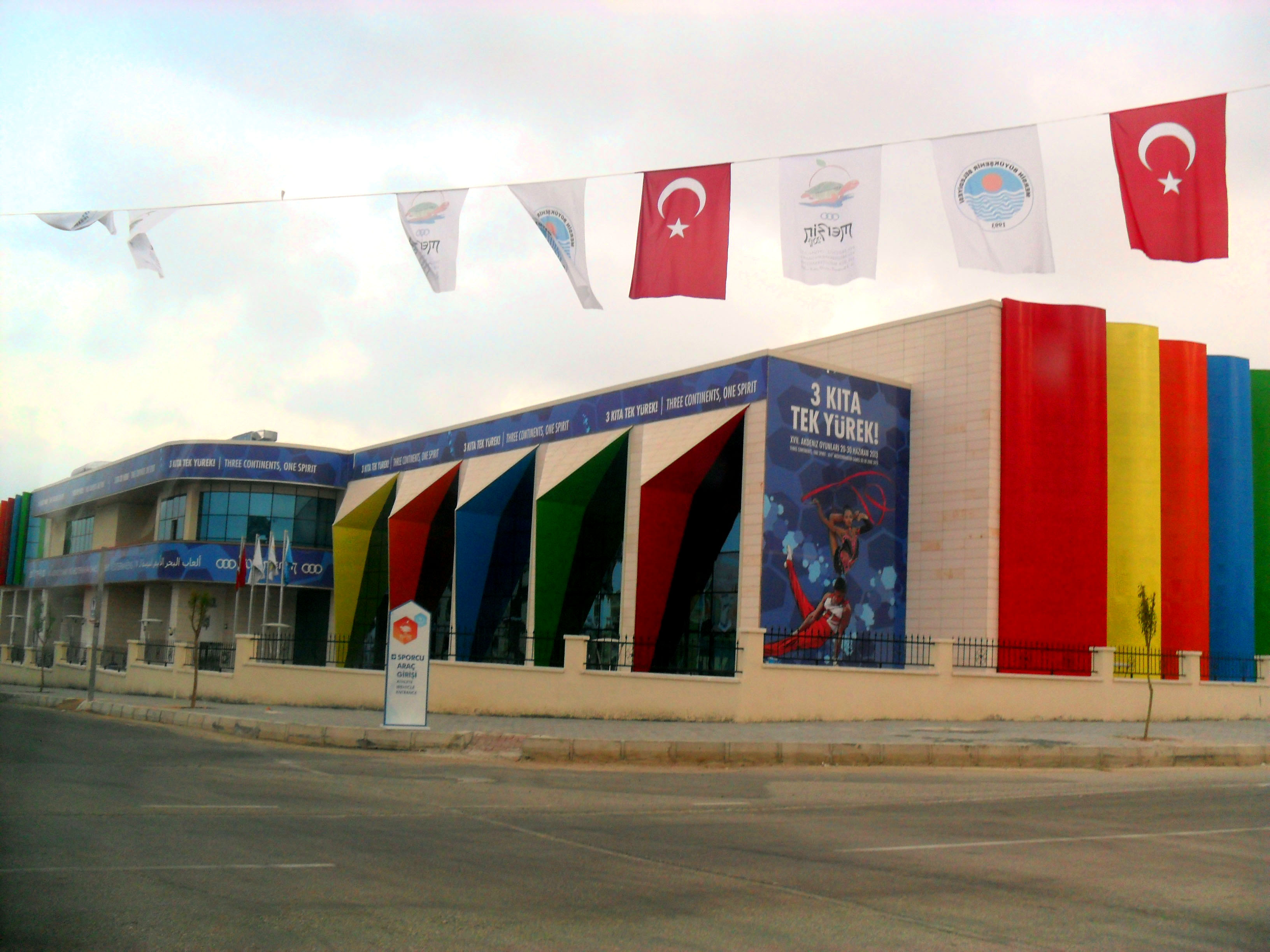
- Mersin Gymnastics Hall
- Interactive map of Mersin Gymnastics Hall; Mersin Cimnastik Salonu
- Location: 32nd St., Yenişehir, Mersin, Turkey
- Coordinates: 36°47′03″N 34°33′03″E
- Owner: Ministry of Youth and Sports
- Capacity: 1,288

Construction
- Opened: 2013; 13 years ago

Mersin Gymnstics Hall (Turkish: Mersin Cimnastik Salonu) is an indoor sports hall for gymnastics events located at Yenişehir in Mersin, Turkey

The sports venue is located at Akkent neighborhood, 32nd St. 63 in Yenişehir, Mersin, to the east of Mersin University campus and to the south of Servet Tazegül Arena and Mersin Tennis Complex. It was built on a 13,965 m^{2} (150,320 sq ft) land in 2013 for the 2013 Mediterranean Games. It has a total seating capacity of 1,288.

== International events hosted ==
The hall hosted 2013 Mediterranean Games' artistic gymnastics between 18 and 24 June and rhythmic gymnastics events between 29 and 30 June.

The 2020 European Men's Artistic Gymnastics Championships will be held between 9 and 13 December, and the 2020 European Women's Artistic Gymnastics Championships between 17 and 20 December 2020 at the venue.
