= Andorra at the 2022 Mediterranean Games =

Mediterranean Games edition

- IOC code: AND
- NOC: Andorran Olympic Committee
- Competitors: 11 in 4 sports
- Medals: Gold 0 Silver 0 Bronze 0 Total 0

Mediterranean Games appearances (overview)
- 2001; 2005; 2009; 2013; 2018; 2022

Andorra competed at the 2022 Mediterranean Games in Oran, Algeria from 25 June to 6 July 2022.

== Athletics ==
Andorra competed in athletics.

- Note–Ranks given for track events are within the athlete's heat only
- Q = Qualified for the next round
- q = Qualified for the next round as a fastest loser or, in field events, by position without achieving the qualifying target
- NR = National record
- N/A = Round not applicable for the event
- Bye = Athlete not required to compete in round

Men

Athlete	Event	Heat		Quarterfinal		Semifinal		Final	
Athlete	Event	Result	Rank	Result	Rank	Result	Rank	Result	Rank
Pol Moya	800 m	1:49.39	15	did not advance					
Pol Moya	1500 m	—						3:43.58	5
Nahuel Carabaña	1500 m	—						3:51.89	12

Women

Athlete	Event	Heat		Quarterfinal		Semifinal		Final	
Athlete	Event	Time	Rank	Time	Rank	Time	Rank	Time	Rank
Carlota Malaga	200 m	26.62	14	did not advance					
Bruna Luque	400 m hurdles	1:04.43	13	did not advance					

== Boules ==
Andorra participated in boules.

Pentaque

Athlete	Event	Preliminary round				Quarterfinals	Semifinals	Final / BM	
Athlete	Event	Round 1	Rank	Round 2	Rank	Opposition Score	Opposition Score	Opposition Score	Rank
Jon Fortes Porres	Men's precision throw	28	7	28	9	did not advance			
Frederic Breton Martin	Men's precision throw	did not start							

Athlete	Event	Group stage		Quarterfinals	Semifinals	Final / BM	
Athlete	Event	Opposition Score	Rank	Opposition Score	Opposition Score	Opposition Score	Rank
Jon Fortes Porres; Frederic Breton Martin	Men's doubles	Tunisia (TUN) L 5–10; Turkey (TUR) L 11-12	4	did not advance			

== Karate ==
Andorra participated in karate.

Kumite

Women

Athlete	Event	Round of 16	Quarterfinals	Semifinals	Repechage	Final / BM	
Athlete	Event	Opposition Result	Opposition Result	Opposition Result	Opposition Result	Opposition Result	Rank
Sandra Herver Fernandez	Women's −61 kg	Chaima Midi (ALG); L 0–1	—		Anthea Stylianou (CYP); L 2-2	Did not advance	7

== Swimming ==
Andorra participated in swimming.

Men

Athlete	Event	Heat		Final	
Athlete	Event	Time	Rank	Time	Rank
Tomàs Lomero Arenas	50 m freestyle	23.83	18	did not advance	
Tomàs Lomero Arenas	100 m freestyle	51.86	16	did not advance	
Tomàs Lomero Arenas	50 m butterfly	24.47	12	did not advance	
Tomàs Lomero Arenas	100 m butterfly	55.16	14	did not advance	
Patrick Pelegrina	50 m backstroke	27.46	16	did not advance	
Patrick Pelegrina	50 m breaststroke	28.85	11	did not advance	
Patrick Pelegrina	100 m breaststroke	1:03.82	13	did not advance	

Women

Athlete	Event	Heat		Final	
Athlete	Event	Time	Rank	Time	Rank
Mònica Ramírez	50 m backstroke	30.99	14	Did not advance	
Mònica Ramírez	50 m freestyle	27.34	20	Did not advance	
Nàdia Tudó	50 m freestyle	27.99	21	Did not advance	
Nàdia Tudó	100 m freestyle	1:00.02	18	Did not advance	
Nàdia Tudó	100 m breaststroke	1:13.25	11	Did not advance	
Nàdia Tudó	200 m breaststroke	2:37.60	9	Did not advance	
