= Mersin District 7 Sports Hall =

Indoor arena in Mersin, Turkey

- 7. Bölge Spor Salonu (Turkish)
- Interactive map of Mersin District 7 Sports Hall
- Location: Toroslar, Mersin, Turkey
- Coordinates: 36°49′25″N 34°36′37″E
- Owner: Mersin National Education Directoriate
- Operator: Mersin Youth Services and Sports Directoriate
- Capacity: 325

Construction
- Opened: 2005; 21 years ago
- Renovated: 2013; 13 years ago

The Mersin District 7 Sports Hall (Turkish: 7. Bölge Spor Salonu) is a multi-sport indoor arena located at Toroslar district of Mersin Province, Turkey. Owned by the Mersin National Education Directoriate, the sports hall was leased free of charge to the Mersin Youth Services and Sports Directoriate for a time span of 49 years in 2005. The venue is suitable for use of basketball, boxing, martial arts, table tennis, volleyball and wrestling events, and has a seating capacity of 325.

The sports hall covers an area of 9,000 m^{2} (97,000 sq ft). The locker rooms of the venue were renovated in 2007. In 2012, the sports hall underwent a major renovation and modernization costing about ₺1 million for use during the 2013 Mediterranean Games. Table tennis training activities of the Games were held at the venue.
