= Andorra at the 2013 Mediterranean Games =

- IOC code: AND
- NOC: Andorran Olympic Committee

in Mersin
- Competitors: 14 in 8 sports
- Medals Ranked th: Gold 0 Silver 0 Bronze 0 Total 0

Mediterranean Games appearances (overview)
- 2001; 2005; 2009; 2013; 2018; 2022

Andorra competed at the 2013 Mediterranean Games in Mersin, Turkey from the 20 to 30 June 2013.

Andorra was represented by fourteen athletes in eight sports.

== Athletics ==
Andorra was represented by three athletes.

Men
Track & road events

| Athlete | Event | Semifinal | | Final | |
| Athlete | Event | Result | Rank | Result | Rank |
|---|---|---|---|---|---|
| Mikel de Sa | 100 m | 11.46 | 7 | Did not advance | |
| Josep Sansa | 3000 m steeplechase | —N/a | | 9:44.69 | 11 |

== Bocce ==
Andorra was represented by a men's pétanque doubles team.

Pétanque

| Athlete | Event | Group stage | | | | | Semifinal | Final / BM | |
| Athlete | Event | Opposition Score | Opposition Score | Opposition Score | Opposition Score | Rank | Opposition Score | Opposition Score | Rank |
|---|---|---|---|---|---|---|---|---|---|
| Patrice Lozano; Frederic Breton | Men's doubles | Serbia (SRB); W 13–7 | Italy (ITA); L 9–13 | Algeria (ALG); L 1–13 | Tunisia (TUN); L 0–13 | 4 | Did not advance | | |

== Cycling ==
Andorra was represented by one male cyclist.

| Athlete | Event | Time | Rank |
|---|---|---|---|
| David Albós | Men's time trial | 35:24.51 | 14 |

== Gymnastics ==
=== Rhythmic ===
| Athlete | Event | Qualification | | | | | | Final | | | | | |
| Athlete | Event | Hoop | Ball | Clubs | Ribbon | Total | Rank | Hoop | Ball | Clubs | Ribbon | Total | Rank |
|---|---|---|---|---|---|---|---|---|---|---|---|---|---|
| Fiona Pallarés | All-around | 10.750 | 12.833 | 11.583 | 11.217 | 46.383 | 19 | Did not advance | | | | | |

== Judo ==
Andorra was represented by two athletes.

| Athlete | Event | Round of 16 | Quarterfinals | Semifinals | Repechage | Final / BM | |
| Athlete | Event | Opposition Result | Opposition Result | Opposition Result | Opposition Result | Opposition Result | Rank |
|---|---|---|---|---|---|---|---|
| Daniel García González | Men's −73 kg | Kovačević (SRB); L 000–120 | Did not advance | | | | |
| Eric Risco de la Torre | Men's +100 kg | Subotić (BIH); L 000–100 | Did not advance | | | | |
| Laura Sallés | Women's −63 kg | BYE | Miloševič (SLO); L 000–100 | BYE | Zouak (MAR); L 000–100 | Did not advance | |

== Karate ==
Andorra was represented by two athletes.

| Athlete | Event | Round of 16 | Quarterfinals | Semifinals | Repechage | Final / BM | |
| Athlete | Event | Opposition Result | Opposition Result | Opposition Result | Opposition Result | Opposition Result | Rank |
|---|---|---|---|---|---|---|---|
| Tania Ribeiro | Women's −50 kg | —N/a | Kosmidou (GRE); L 0–3 | Did not advance | | | |
| Maria Spitzer | Women's −68 kg | BYE | Colomar (ESP); L 0–5 | Did not advance | Abdelkader (ALG); L 0–1 | Did not advance | |

== Swimming ==
Andorra was represented by one swimmer in four events.

Women

| Athlete | Event | Heat | | Final | |
| Athlete | Event | Time | Rank | Time | Rank |
|---|---|---|---|---|---|
| Mónica Ramírez | 100 m freestyle | 1:01.33 | 17 | Did not advance | |
| Mónica Ramírez | 200 m freestyle | 2:14.60 | 15 | Did not advance | |

== Taekwondo ==
Andorra was represented by two athletes.

| Athlete | Event | Round of 16 | Quarterfinals | Semifinals | Final / BM | |
| Athlete | Event | Opposition Result | Opposition Result | Opposition Result | Opposition Result | Rank |
|---|---|---|---|---|---|---|
| Carlos Moreno | Men's +80 kg | Trablesi (TUN); L 1–15 PTG | Did not advance | | | |
| Jessica Rovira | Women's −49 kg | Doria (MON); W 7–6 | Abdelsalam (EGY); L 1–13 | Did not advance | | |
