= Servet Tazegül Arena =

Multi-purpose arena in Yenişehir, Turkey

- Servet Tazegül Spor Salonu
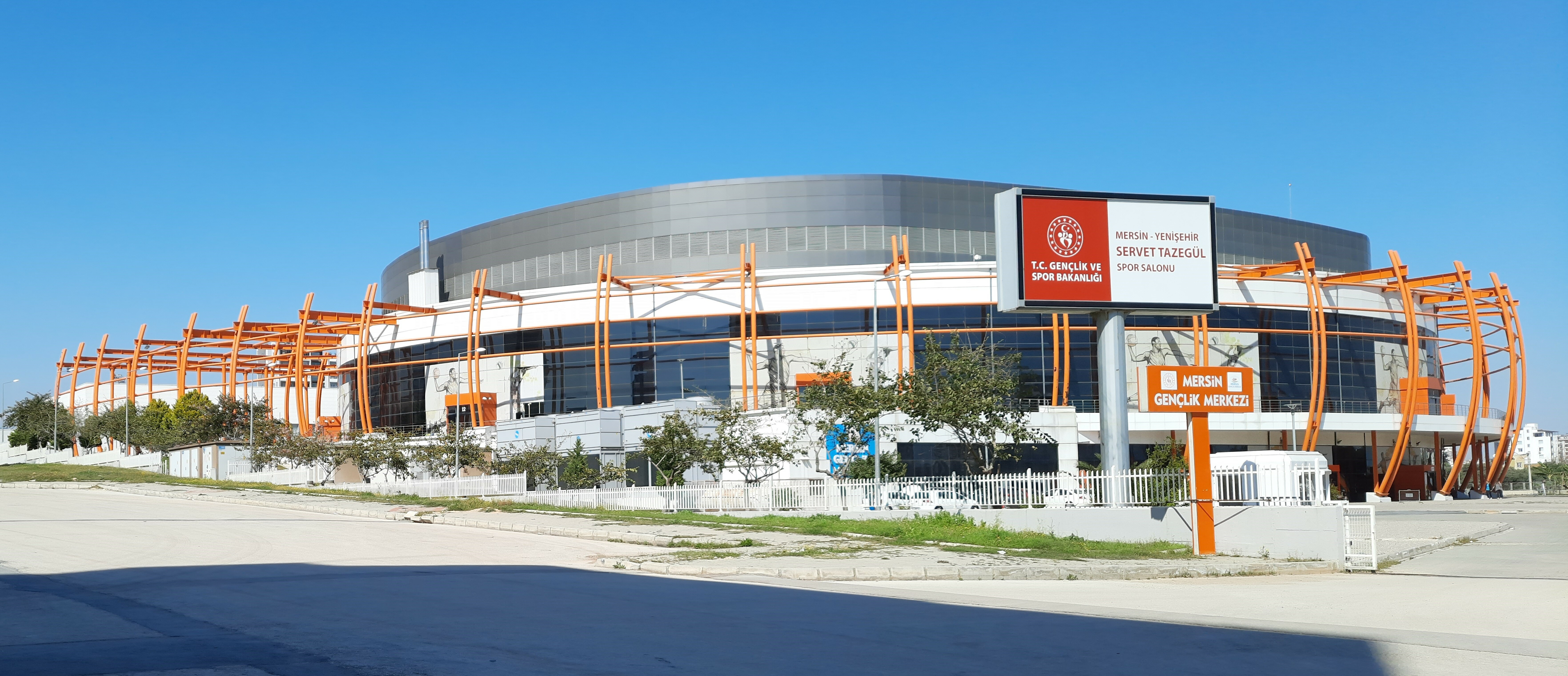
- Interactive map of Servet Tazegül Arena
- Location: Yenişehir, Mersin, Turkey
- Coordinates: 36°47′18″N 34°33′01″E
- Capacity: 7,500

Construction
- Groundbreaking: 20 January 2012
- Opened: 2013; 13 years ago

The Servet Tazegül Arena (Turkish: Servet Tazegül Spor Salonu) is a multi-purpose indoor arena located at Yenişehir district of Mersin, Turkey, named in honor of the Olympic, world and European champion taekwondo practitioner Servet Tazegül (born 1988).

The construction of the building began on 20 January 2012 with the laying of foundation stone. The arena is one of the eleven new-built sports venues in Mersin to host the 2013 Mediterranean Games. With its seating capacity of 7,500, it is one of the biggest indoor arenas in Turkey. It is situated to the south of Mersin Tennis Complex.

== 2013 Mediterranean Games ==
At 2013 Mediterranean Games, the arena hosted basketball event (men) between 17 and 25 June and volleyball semifinal and final events (women and men) between 27 and 30 June.

== See also ==
- List of indoor arenas in Turkey
