= Nevin Yanıt Athletics Complex =

Sports venue in Mersin, Turkey

Nevin Yanıt Athletics Complex Nevin Yanıt Atletizm Kompleksi
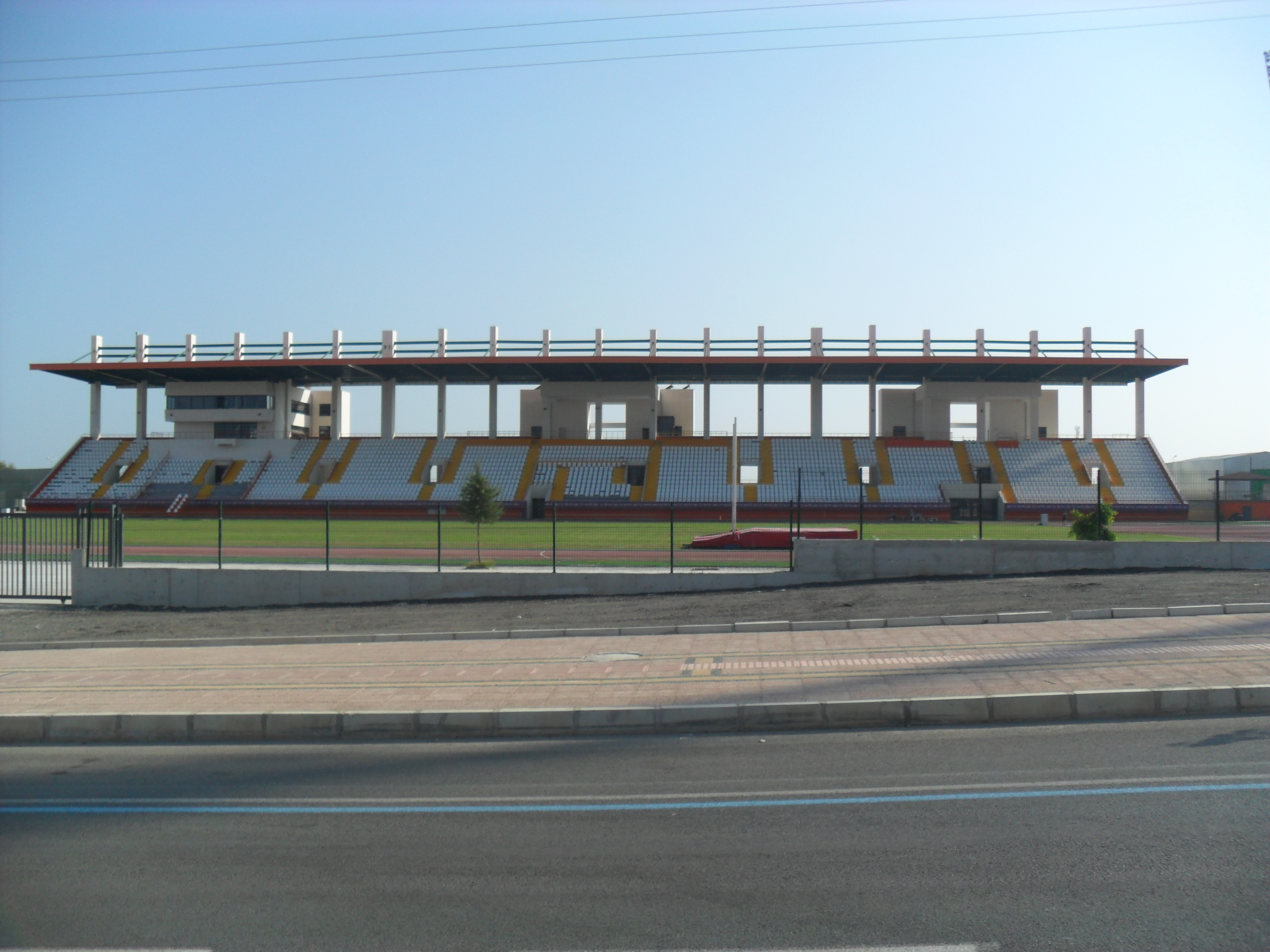
- Interactive map of Nevin Yanıt Athletics Complex; Nevin Yanıt Atletizm Kompleksi
- Location: Mersin, Turkey
- Coordinates: 36°47′18″N 34°33′01″E
- Capacity: 4,500

Construction
- Opened: 2010
- Expanded: 2013

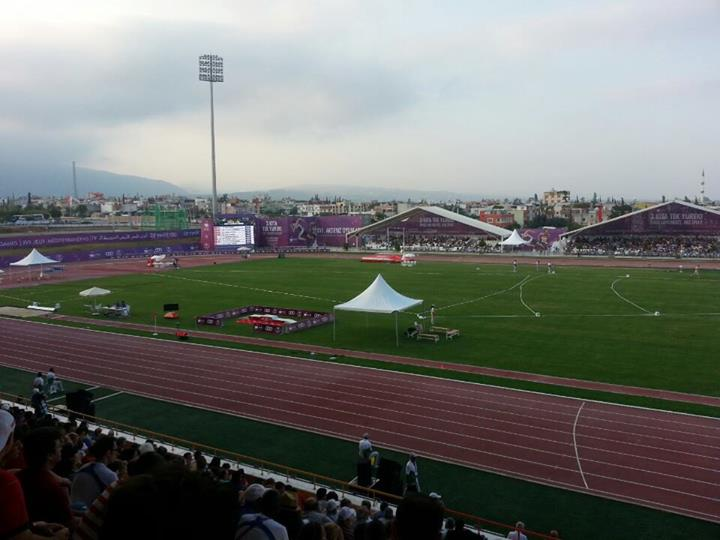

The Nevin Yanıt Athletics Complex (Turkish: Nevin Yanıt Atletizm Kompleksi) also known as Nevin Yanıt Athletics Facility (Turkish: Nevin Yanıt Atletizm Tesisler) is a sports venue for athletics competitions in track and field located in Mersin, Turkey.

== Description ==
The stadium, situated at Kocavilayet neighborhood of Mersin, was built in 2010, and renamed in February 2011 in honor of the European champion hurdler Nevin Yanıt (born 1986), a native of Mersin. It has a seating capacity of 4,500.

The complex hosted the athletics and paralympic athletics events of the 2013 Mediterranean Games.

== See also ==
- Nevin Yanıt
- 2013 Mediterranean Games
