= 2013 Mediterranean Games =

17th edition of the Mediterranean Games

XVII Mediterranean Games
- Emblem of the 2013 Mediterranean Games
- Host city: Mersin
- Country: Turkey
- Edition: 17th
- Nations: 24
- Athletes: 3,064
- Sport: 27
- Events: 264
- Opening: 20 June 2013
- Closing: 30 June 2013
- Opened by: Prime Minister Recep Tayyip Erdoğan
- Main venue: Mersin Arena
- Website: mersin2013.gov.tr

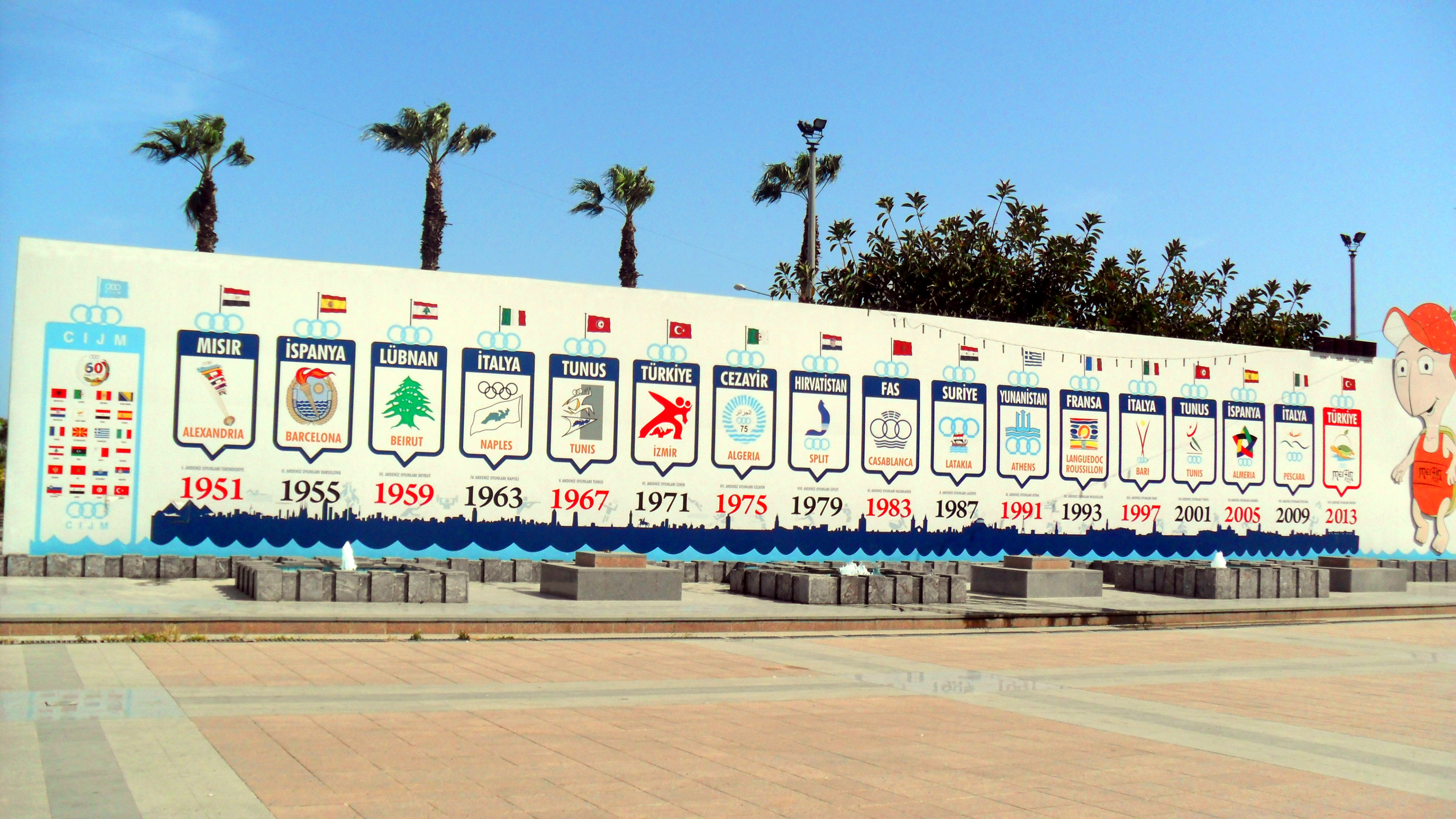
Poster of the Mediterranean Games in Mersin.

The 2013 Mediterranean Games (Turkish: 2013 Akdeniz Oyunları), officially known as the XVII Mediterranean Games (Turkish: XVII Akdeniz Oyunları) and commonly known as Mersin 2013, was an international multi-sport event held from 20 to 30 June 2013 in Mersin, Turkey. Mersin was announced as the host city at the General Assembly of the International Committee of Mediterranean Games (CIJM) on 23 February 2011. Mersin is the second city in Turkey after İzmir to host the Mediterranean Games. All 24 member National Olympic Committees (NOCs) of the ICMG participated in the Games. The official programme for the Games is featuring events in 27 different sports.

== Background ==
The Mediterranean Games is a multi-sport event, much like the Summer Olympics (albeit on a much smaller scale), with participation exclusively from countries around the Mediterranean Sea where Europe, Africa and Asia meet. The Games started in 1951 and are held every four years. The idea of holding the Mediterranean Games originated with Muhammed Taher Pasha, who was the chairman of the Egyptian Olympic Committee and the vice-president of the International Olympic Committee (IOC), at a meeting during the 1948 London Olympics. The Games "were designed specifically to bring together the Muslim and European countries surrounding the Mediterranean basin" to promote understanding through sporting competition.

The first edition of the Mediterranean Games was held in the Egyptian city of Alexandria in 1951 and attracted 734 competitors from 10 nations. Initially the female athletes were not allowed to compete. Beginning by the fifth (1976) game in Tunis female athletes were also allowed. Turkey hosted the Games for the first time in 1971 in Izmir—the sixth edition of the Games.

== Bidding process ==
=== Host city selection ===
Cities from three countries submitted their bids to host the 2013 Mediterranean Games. Two Greek cities, Volos and Larisa, made a combined bid. This was the fourth attempt by the Croatian city of Rijeka to host the Mediterranean Games. Rijeka had lost its bids in 1995 for the 1997 games, in 1999 for the 2001 games and in 2003 for the 2009 Mediterranean Games. The voting for the selection of the host of the 2013 Games was held in Pescara, Italy, host of the 2009 Mediterranean Games, on 27 October 2007. The election was conducted by the Mediterranean Games Bid Committee. At the end of the first round of voting, only Volos-Larisa and Rijeka remained; Mersin was eliminated after having received only thirteen votes. In the first round, Volos-Larisa and Rijeka received 31 and 24 votes, respectively. In the second round, the Greek bid of Volos-Larisa received enough votes to be elected as the host. The final round was comparatively more competitive, which was demonstrated by a three-vote difference between the final two bids.

2013 Mediterranean Games bidding results
City	NOC	Round 1	Round 2
Volos-Larisa	Greece	31	37
Rijeka	Croatia	24	34
Mersin	Turkey	13	—

Location of Mersin in Turkey

Greece was stripped of the hosting rights on 28 January 2011 because of its financial crisis. The ICMG cited Greece's inability to conform the organisational requirements as a reason for this action. Culture and Tourism Minister of Greece Pavlos Geroulanos said that the initially proposed budget "would have wasted money on a big, spendthrift party, [and that] [t]here are much better things [they] could spend that money on in the current situation". ICMG conducted an on-line poll on 23 February to decide the new host. Three cities—Tarragona, Tripoli and Mersin—offered to host the 2013 Mediterranean Games. Citizens of the 21 member nations of the ICMG cast their votes to select the host. Mersin was selected after it received more than half of the total votes, and on 4 March, ICMG president Amar Addad officially handed over the hosting rights of the 2013 Games to Mersin.

== Development and preparation ==
=== Organisation ===
The organising committee of the 2013 Mediterranean Games consisted of eight members: president of the committee is Minister of Youth and Sports Suat Kılıç, Hakan Hakyemez, Governor of Mersin Hasan Basri Güzeloğlu, Mehmet Baykan, Mersin Metropolitan Municipality Mayor Macit Özcan, rector of the Mersin University K. Aydin Süha, Hasan Albayrak and president of the Turkish Olympic Committee Uğur Erdener. It was in charge of "organising and controlling the essential preparations".

=== Costs ===
After the success of the bid in February 2011, the Ministry of Youth and Sports spent ₺ 215 million on building the venues and infrastructure up to 31 December 2012. The Ministry has allocated a budget of ₺ 400 million to cover building the venues and infrastructure for the Games; at least ₺ 100 million was spent on the development of the Games village and the main stadium, and ₺ 200 million was assigned for other venues.

=== Logo and mascot ===
Karetta, mascot of the 2013 Games

The official logo of this edition of the Mediterranean Games featured a loggerhead sea turtle (Caretta caretta) getting out of sea, with water underneath it. An orange is shown above its back, which represents the dry summer subtropical climate of Mediterranean.

Karetta was the official mascot of the Mersin Games. The organisers of the 2013 Games have taken steps to promote the Games through its mascot. It was used in various events like the 34th Istanbul Marathon, Third Citrus Festival and others.

=== Venues ===
The main stadium of the 2013 Mediterranean Games is Mersin Olympic Stadium in Yenişehir district of Mersin. The stadium hosted both the opening and closing ceremonies. A total of 38 venues were used to host the events during the Games, 13 of them for training purposes only. The events took place in several venues at different districts of Mersin and neighboring city of Adana.

List of venues, showing the city, venue, sport and venue capacity
City	Venue	Sport	Capacity	Ref
Erdemli	Erdemli Shooting Range	Shooting	1,550	
Mersin	Nevin Yanıt Athletics Complex	Athletics	4,500	
Mersin	Nevin Yanıt Athletics Complex	Paralympic athletics	4,500	
Mersin	Adnan Menderes Blvd	Cycling		
Mersin	Adnan Menderes Blvd	Athletics Half marathon & 20 km walk		
Mersin	Mersin University, Çiftlikköy Campus Hall No. 1	Judo		
Mersin	Mersin University, Çiftlikköy Campus Hall No. 1	Badminton		
Tarsus	Tarsus Arena	Boxing	1,500	
Mersin	Servet Tazegül Arena	Basketball	7,500	
Mersin	Servet Tazegül Arena	Volleyball finals	7,500	
Adana	Adana Equestrian Club	Equestrian		
Mersin	Tevfik Sırrı Gür Stadium	Football	20,000	
Mersin	CNR Yenişehir Fair Ground Hall A	Fencing		
Mersin	CNR Yenişehir Fair Ground Hall A	Table tennis		
Mersin	CNR Yenişehir Fair Ground Hall C	Wrestling		
Mersin	Mersin District 7 Sports Hall	Table tennis training		
Adana	Yüreğir Serinevler Arena	Handball women's	2,500	
Adana	Sakıp Sabancı Sports Hall	Handball training		
Tarsus	Seyfi Ali Türkoğlu Field	Football training		
Tarsus	Anafartalar Field	Football training		
Tarsus	Tarsus City Stadium	Football training		
Mersin	Mersin Volleyball Hall	Volleyball men's	1,000	
Erdemli	Erdemli Sports Hall	Weightlifting	500	
Adana	Lütfullah Aksungur Sports Hall	Handball men's	1,750	
Adana	Seyhan Dam	Rowing	1,000	
Adana	Seyhan Dam	Canoeing	1,000	
Kızkalesi	Kızkalesi Beach	Beach volleyball		
Mersin	Macit Özcan Sports Complex Swimming Pool	Water polo		
Mersin	Edip Buran Arena	Taekwondo	1,750	
Mersin	Edip Buran Arena	Karate	1,750	
Mersin	Mezitli Sports Hall	Judo training	1,500	
Mersin	Seyfi Alanya Sports Hall	Badminton training	500	
Mersin	Gelişim Koleji Sports Hall	Volleyball women's training		
Mersin	Toroslar Bocce Facility	Bocce	1,000	
Mersin	Davultepe Sports Hall	Boxing training		
Mersin	Mersin Gymnastics Hall	Rhythmic gymnastics Artistic gymnastics	1,000	
Mersin	İçel Anadolu High School	Volleyball men's training		
Mersin	Mersin Tourism and Hotel Management High School	Volleyball men's training		
Tarsus	3 Ocak Field	Football training		
Tarsus	Burhanettin Kocamaz Stadium	Football	4,200	
Mersin	Koray Aydın Stadium	Football training	8,000	
Mersin	Mersin Olympic Swimming Pool	Swimming	1,000	
Mersin	Mersin Olympic Swimming Pool	Paralympic swimming	1,000	
Mersin	Mersin Marina	Sailing		
Mersin	Mersin University, Çiftlikköy Campus Hall No. 2	Volleyball men's	500	
Mersin	Mersin Tennis Complex	Tennis	3,000	
Mersin	Mersin University, Çiftlikköy Campus Swimming Pool	Water polo training		

== The Games ==
=== Sports ===
There were significant changes in the programme for the Mersin Games in comparison to that of the 2009 Mediterranean Games held in Pescara. Three new sports, archery, badminton and taekwondo, were the special additions. The programme for the Games featured a total of 27 different sports. Two disabled sports—athletics and swimming—were contested by the athletes with physical disabilities. Even though it was planned, equestrian competitions were not held.

- Aquatics
  - Swimming
  - Paralympic swimming
  - Water polo
- Archery
- Athletics
  - Athletics
  - Paralympic athletics
- Badminton
- Basketball
- Bocce
- Boxing
- Canoeing
- Cycling
- Fencing
- Football
- Gymnastics
  - Artistic gymnastics
  - Rhythmic gymnastics
- Handball
- Judo
- Karate
- Rowing
- Sailing
- Shooting
- Table tennis
- Taekwondo
- Tennis
- Volleyball
  - Beach volleyball
  - Indoor volleyball
- Water skiing
- Weightlifting
- Wrestling

●	Opening ceremony	●	Competitions	●	Event finals	●	Closing ceremony

	June												
Sport	18	19	20	21	22	23	24	25	26	27	28	29	30
Ceremonies			●										●
Archery					●	2	2						
Artistic gymnastics				1	1	2	10						
Athletics									9	10	12	13	
Badminton								●	●	●	●	2	2
Basketball	●	●		●	●			1					
Beach volleyball								●	●	●	2		
Bocce								●	2	4	2	2	
Boxing					●	●	●	●	10				
Canoeing										●	3	3	
Cycling								1			1		
Fencing					3	3							
Football		●		●		●		●	●	1			
Handball					●	●	●	●	●	●	●	1	1
Judo				5	5	4							
Karate											7	3	
Rhythmic gymnastics												●	1
Rowing				●	●	7							
Sailing				●	●	●		●	●	4			
Shooting						3	3	1	3	2	1		
Swimming				9	7	10	8	6					
Table tennis								●	●	2	●	2	
Taekwondo				3	3	2							
Tennis							●	●	●	●	2	2	
Volleyball				●	●	●	●	●	●	●	●	1	1
Water polo		●		●	●	●		1					
Water skiing					●	2							
Weightlifting				6	6	4	4	6	2				
Wrestling					4	3	6	4	3				

== Participating nations ==
All 24 member countries of the ICMG participated in the Games. This was the highest number of nations in any edition of the Mediterranean Games. Macedonia (FYROM) made its debut in the Games.

- Albania
- Algeria
- Andorra
- Bosnia and Herzegovina
- Croatia
- Cyprus
- Egypt
- France
- Greece
- Italy
- Lebanon
- Libya
- Macedonia (debuting country)
- Malta
- Monaco
- Montenegro
- Morocco
- San Marino
- Serbia
- Slovenia
- Spain
- Syria
- Tunisia
- Turkey (host country)

List of flagbearers, showing the country, flag bearer and sport
Order	Country	Flag bearer	Sport
1	Albania		
2	Algeria		
3	Andorra		
4	Bosnia and Herzegovina	Amel Mekić	Judo
5	Croatia	Giovanni Cernogoraz	Shooting
6	Cyprus	Herodotos Giorgallas	Gymnastics
7	Egypt	Alaaeldin Abouelkassem	Fencing
8	France	Steeve Guénot	Wrestling
9	Greece		
10	Italy	Jessica Rossi	Shooting
11	Lebanon		
12	Libya		
13	(North Macedonia) Macedonia	Darko Sokolov	Basketball
14	Malta		
15	Monaco		
16	Montenegro	Milena Knežević	Handball
17	Morocco		
18	San Marino	Karim Gharbi	Judo
19	Serbia	Ivana Maksimović	Shooting
20	Slovenia	Lucija Polavder	Judo
21	Spain	Nicolás García	Taekwondo
22	Syria		
23	Tunisia		
24	Turkey	Rıza Kayaalp	Wrestling

== Medal table ==
* Host nation (Turkey)

Final medal table, from official website of 2013 Mediterranean Games
Rank	Nation	Gold	Silver	Bronze	Total
1	Italy	70	52	64	186
2	Turkey*	47	43	36	126
3	France	25	26	45	96
4	Spain	21	32	29	82
5	Egypt	21	22	24	67
6	Greece	15	18	26	59
7	Slovenia	13	11	11	35
8	Serbia	12	11	11	34
9	Croatia	11	7	9	27
10	Tunisia	9	17	22	48
11–24	Remaining	23	24	49	96
Totals (24 entries)		267	263	326	856

== Gallery ==
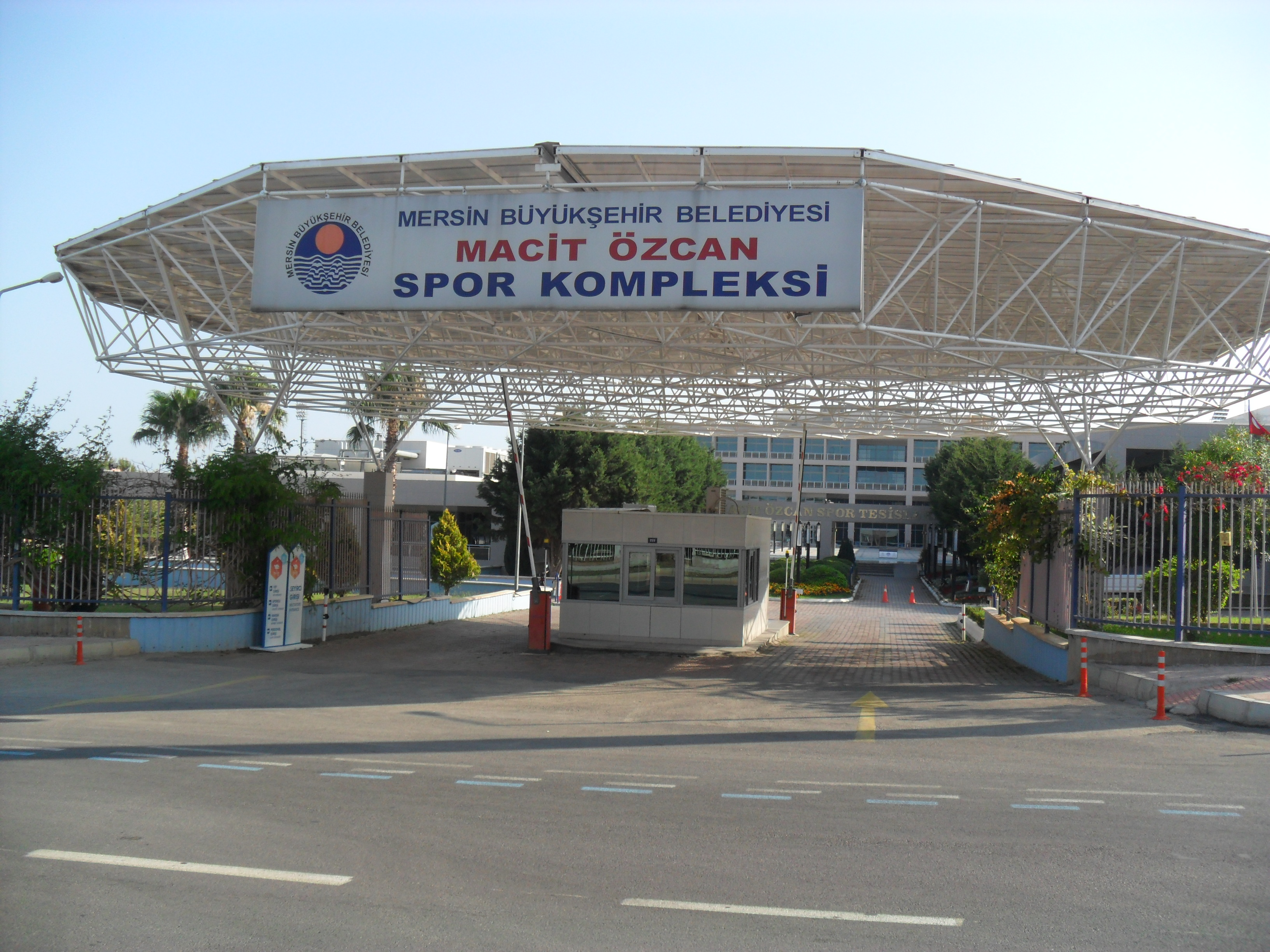
Macit Özcan Sports Complex

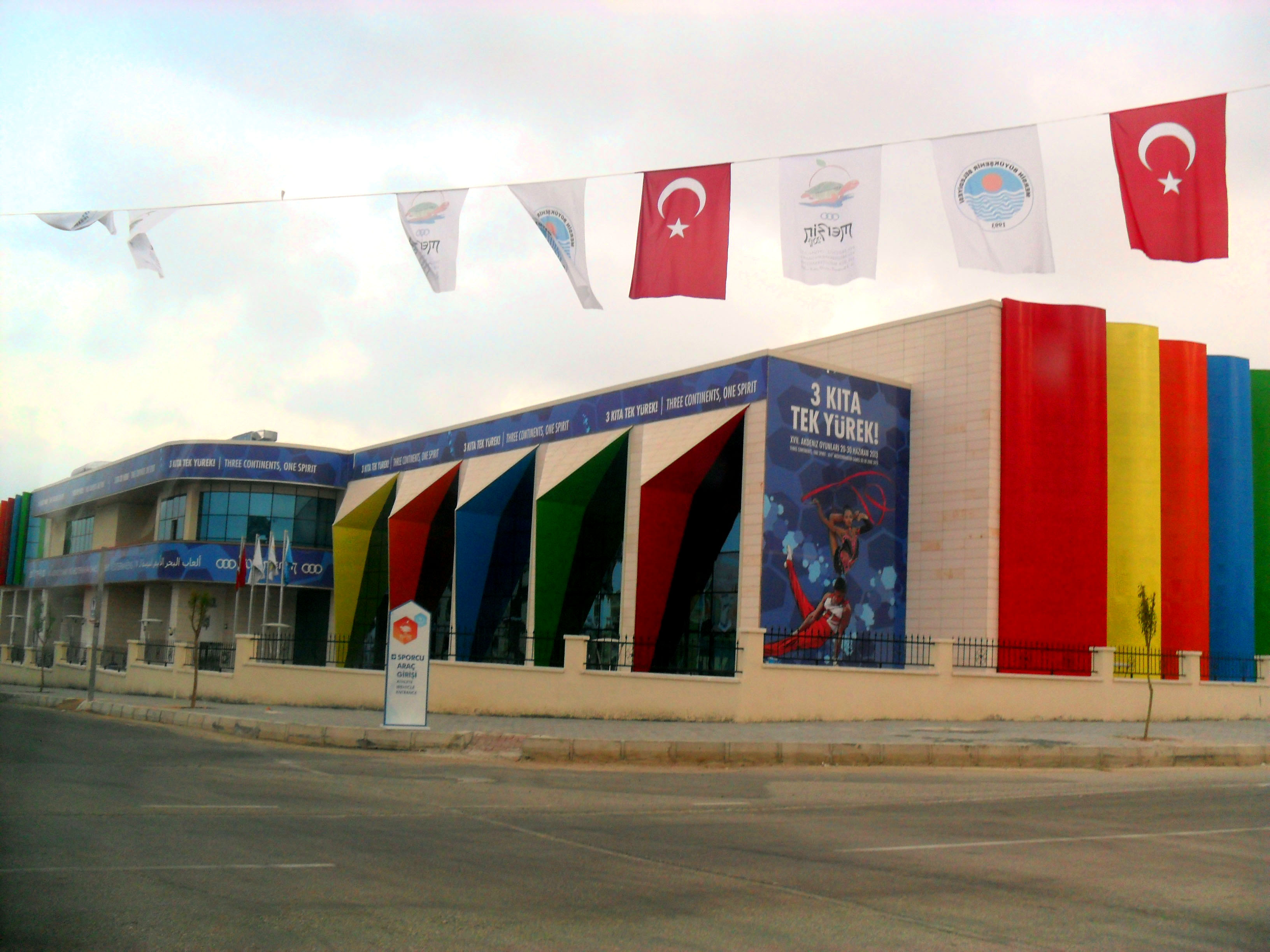
Mersin Gymnastics Hall

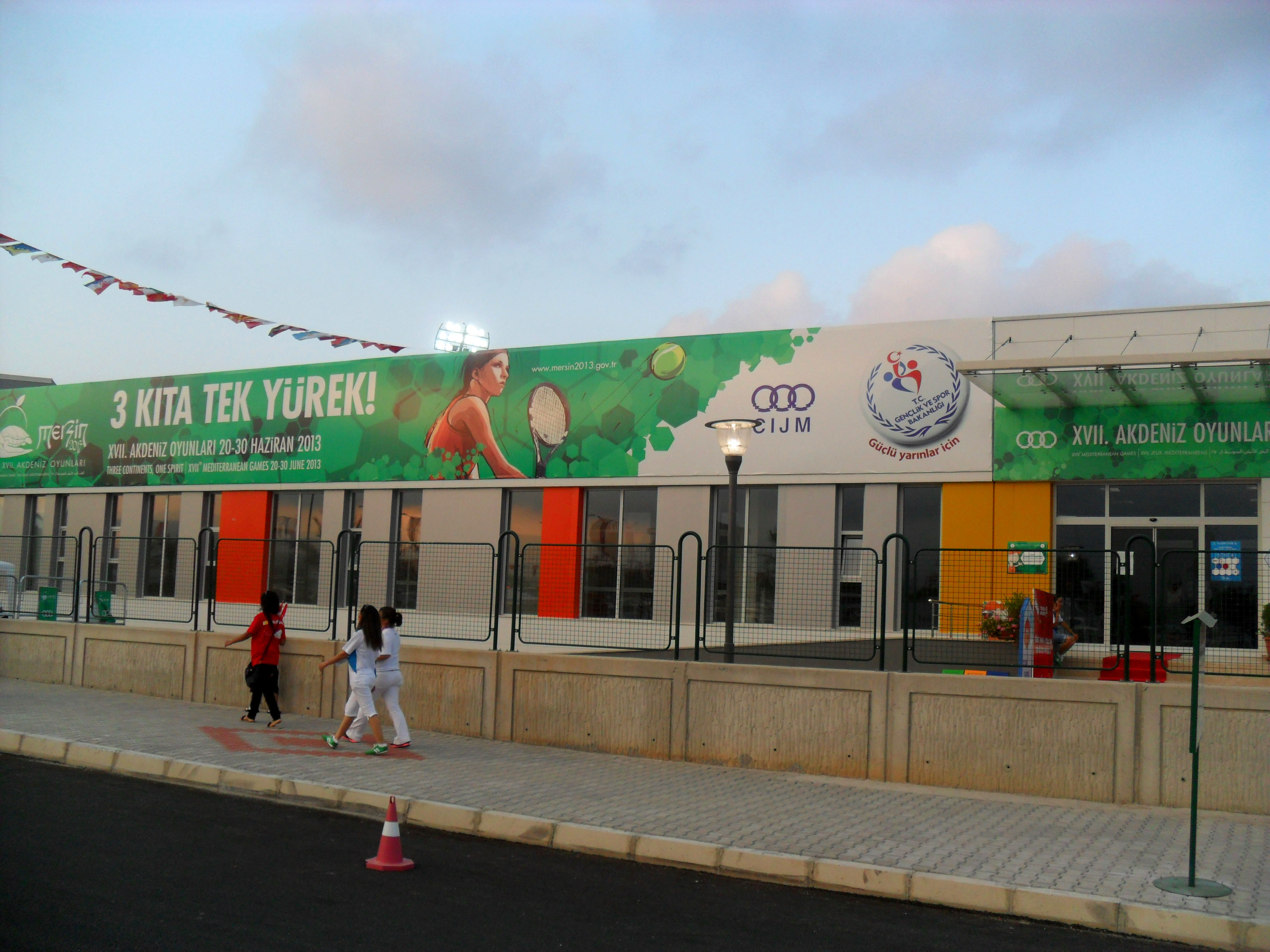
Mersin Tennis Complex

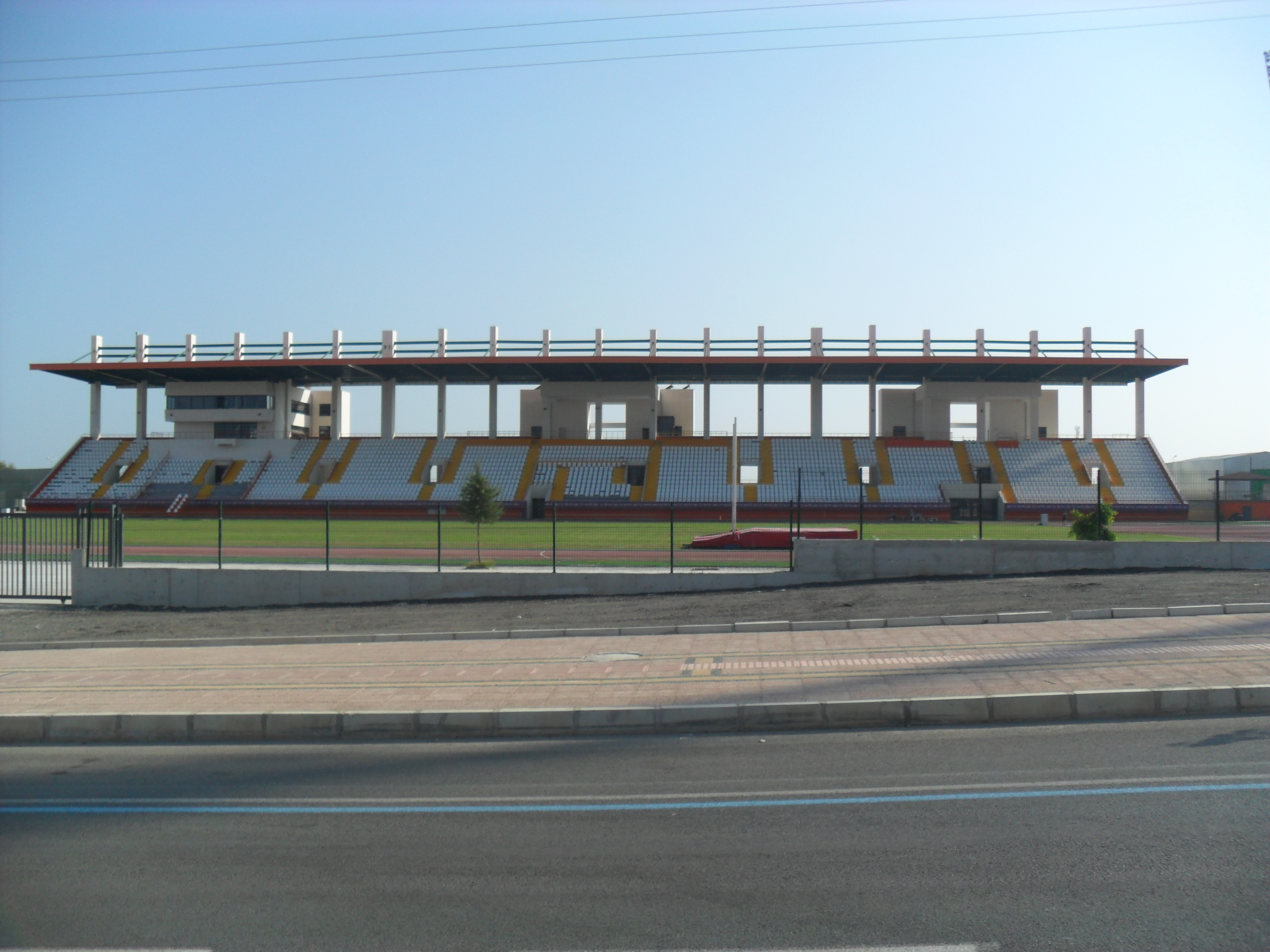
Nevin Yanıt Athletics Complex

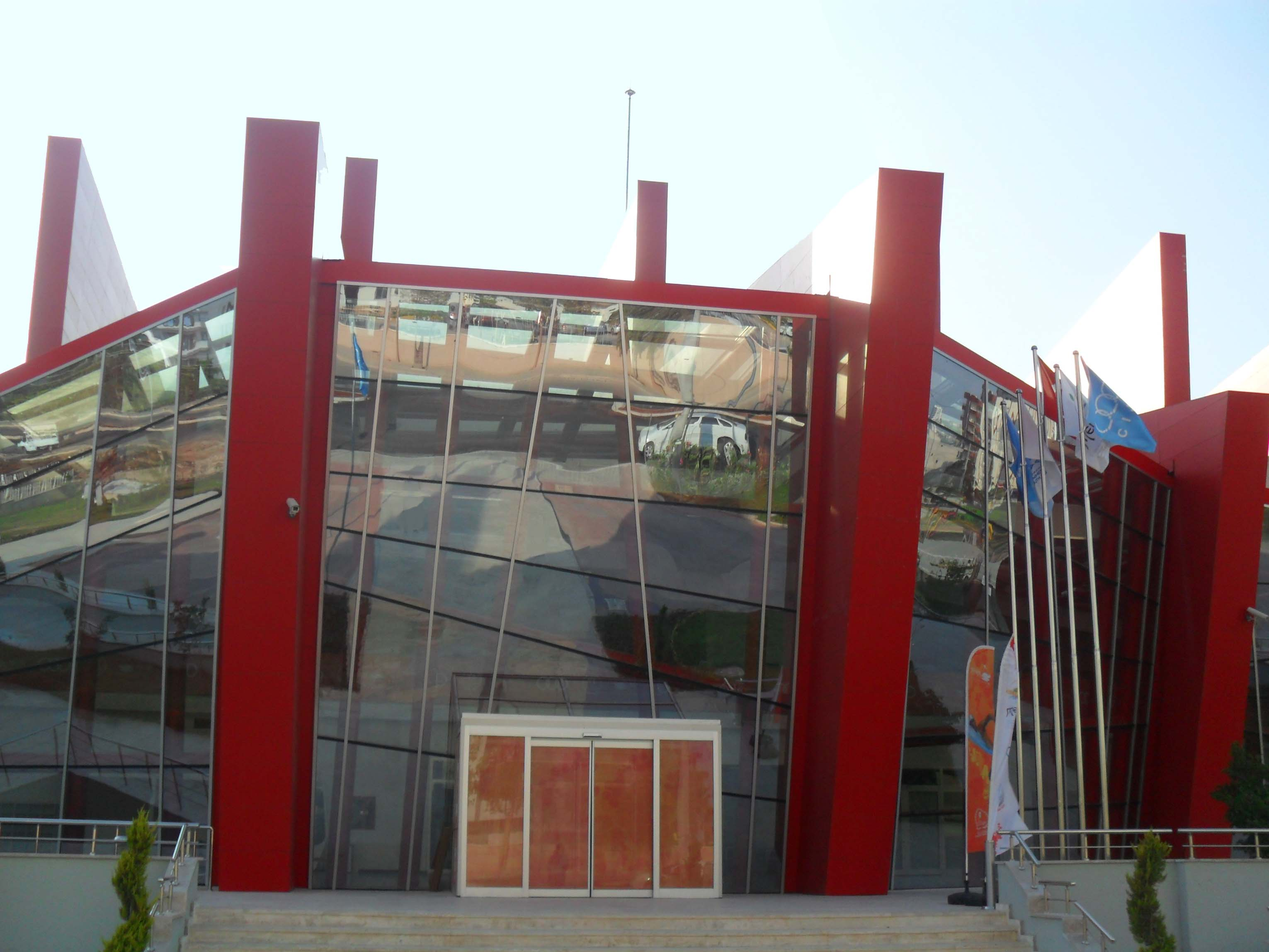
Mersin Olympic Swimming Pool

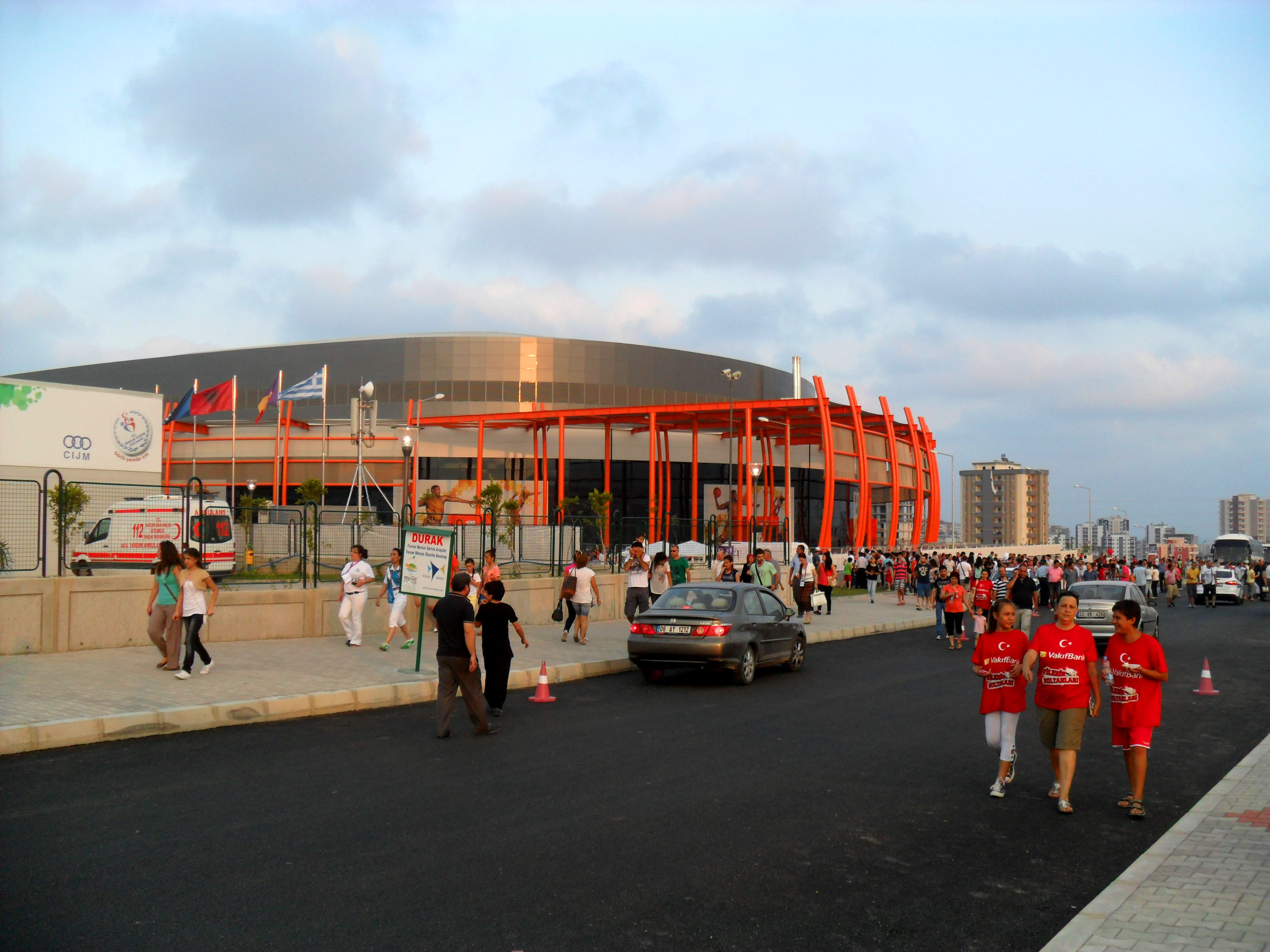
Servet Tazegül Arena

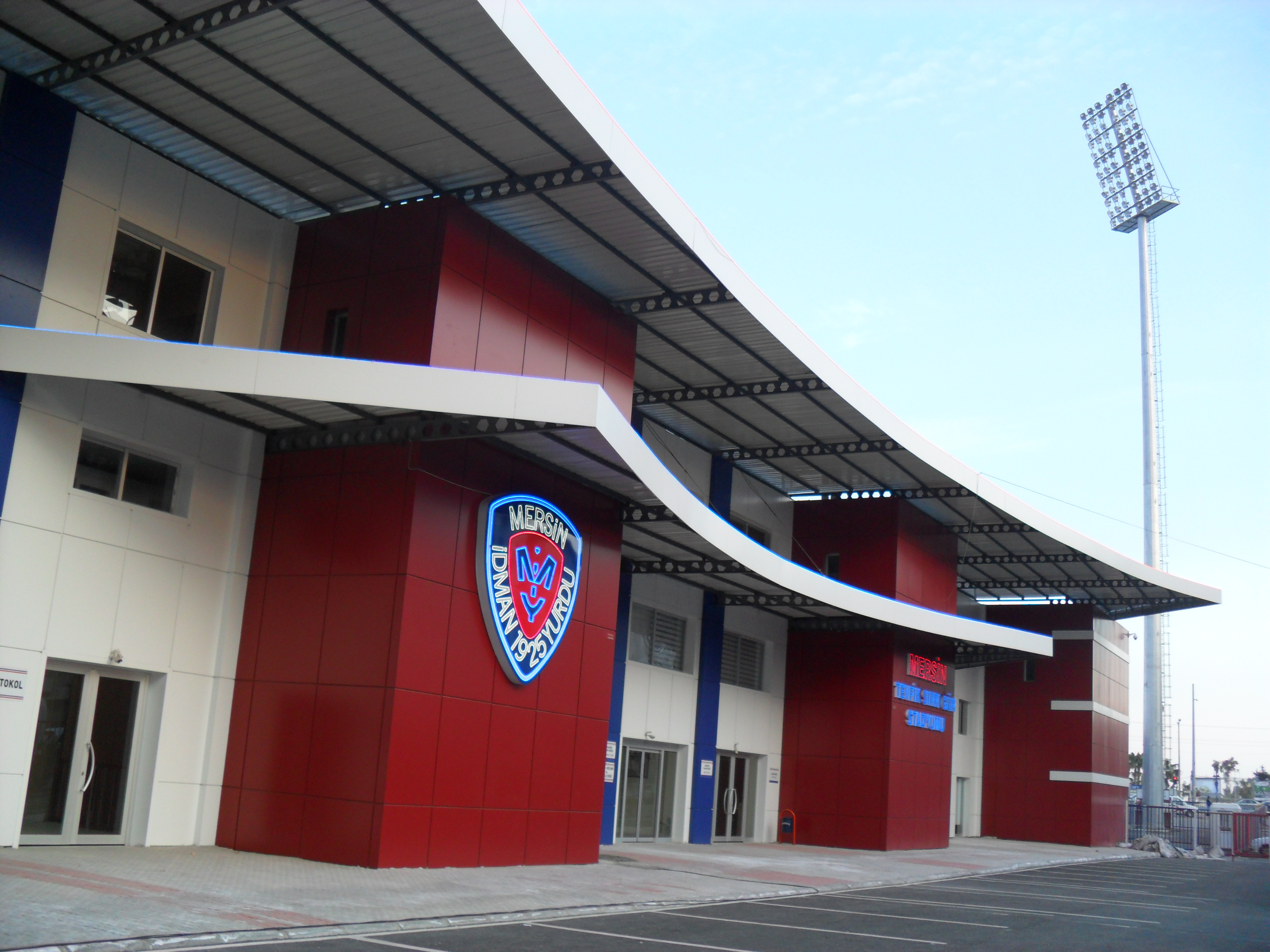
Tevfik Sırrı Gür Stadium

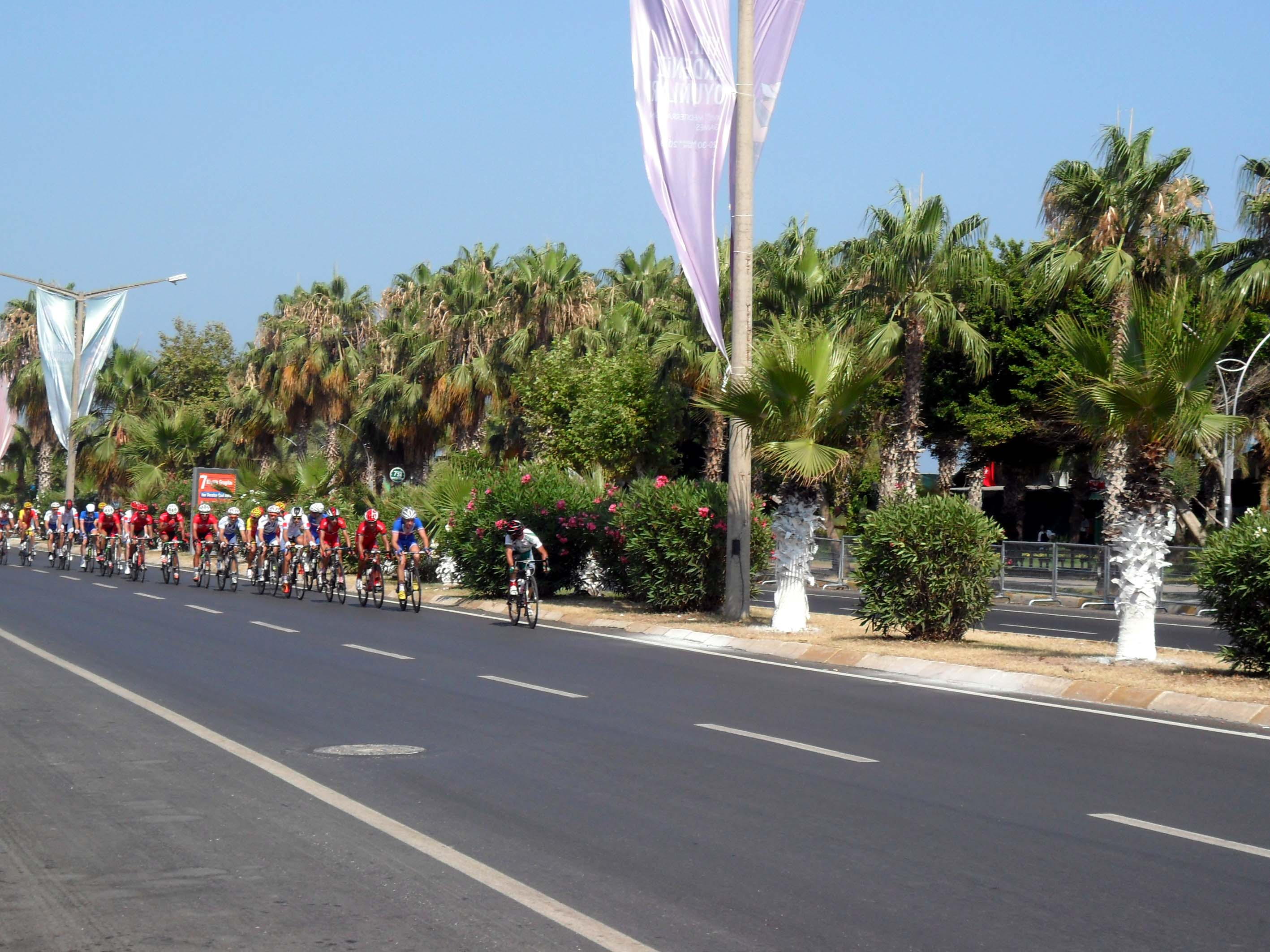
Adnan Menderes Boulevard

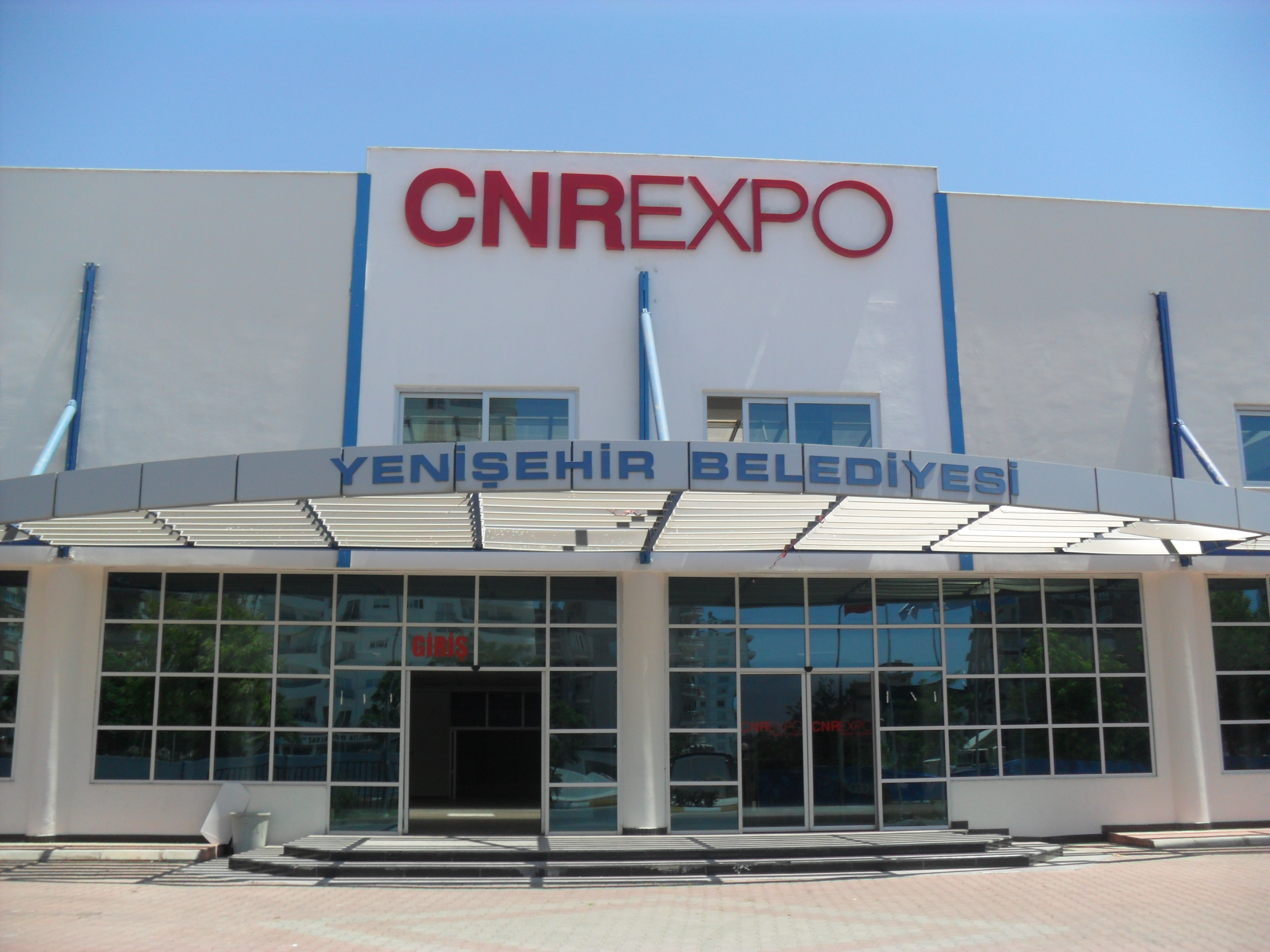
CNR Yenişehir Exhibition Center

Preceded by Pescara	Mediterranean Games; Mersin; 2013	Succeeded by Tarragona
