= Mersin Tennis Complex =

Multi tennis court in Turkey

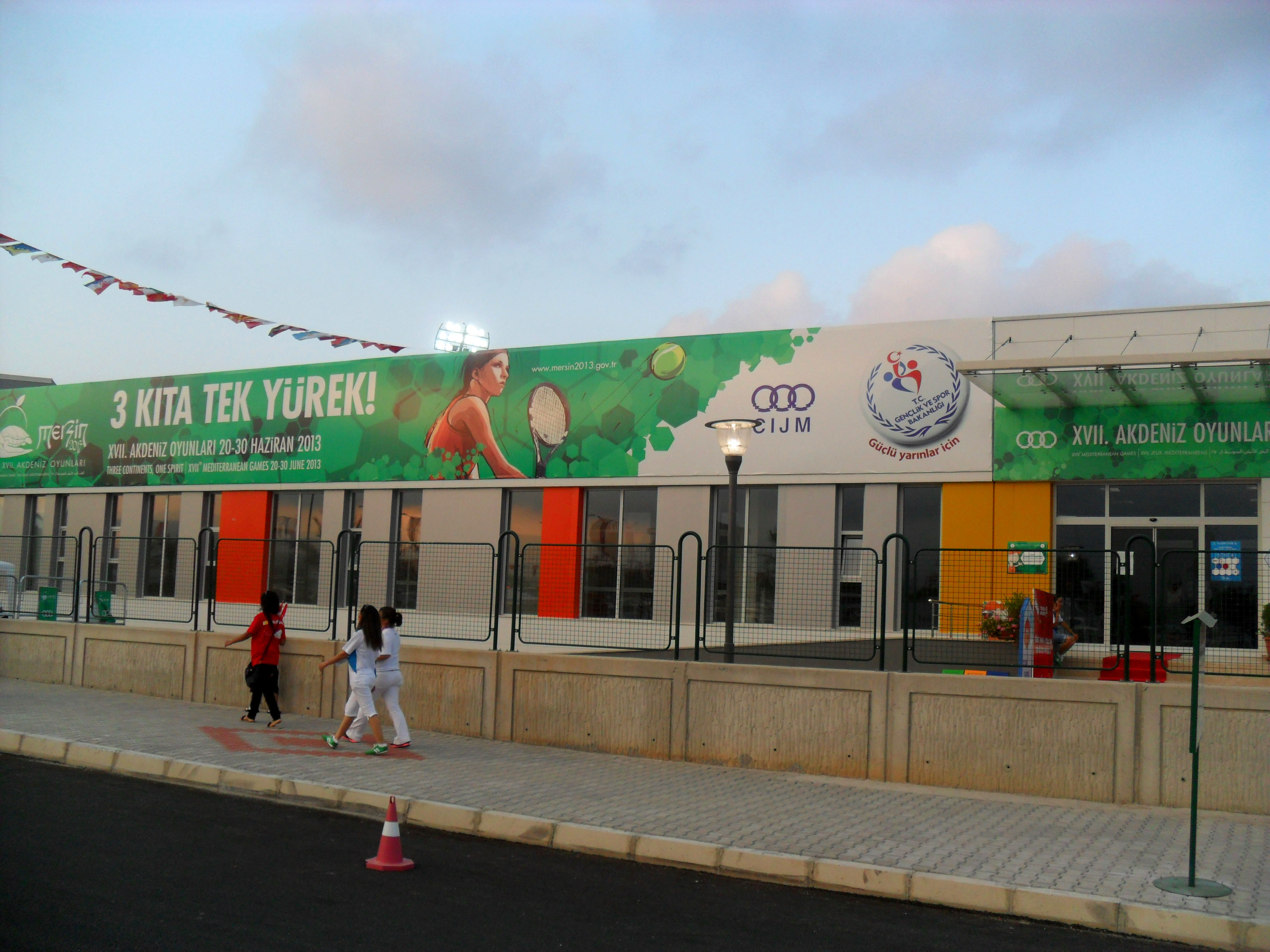
- Interactive map of Mersin Tennis Complex
- Location: 32.cadde, Yenişehir, Mersin
- Coordinates: 36°47′27″N 34°33′05″E
- Owner: Ministry of Youth and Sports
- Capacity: 3000

Construction
- Opened: 2013; 13 years ago

Mersin Tennis Complex is a multi tennis court constructed for the 2013 Mediterranean Games in Mersin, Turkey.

== Geography ==
At about 36°47′27″N 34°33′05″E the tennis complex is situated to the west of the city center. The beeline distance between the complex and the Mediterranean Sea coast is 2,800 metres (9,200 ft).

== Description ==
The complex consists of two blocks. There are two indoor and eight open courts in the complex. The total sitting capacity of the main court is 3000.

== 2013 Mediterranean Games ==
At 2013 Mediterranean Games the complex hosted tennis event between 24th and 29 June.
