= Weightlifting at the 2015 African Games =

Weightlifting at the 2015 African Games in Brazzaville was held between September 7–9, 2015 while Powerlifting was held on September 11 and 12, 2015.

It also counted as 2015 African Weightlifting Championships. Only total medals counted for African Games while snatch and clean & jerk medals counted for the African Weightlifting Championships.

The women's -53 kg gold medallist Elizabeth Onuah of Nigeria was stripped of her medals for doping.

== Medal table ==
Rank	Nation	Gold	Silver	Bronze	Total
1	Egypt (EGY)	31	15	12	58
2	Nigeria (NGR)	16	24	11	51
3	Tunisia (TUN)	8	5	5	18
4	Libya (LBA)	2	4	6	12
5	Seychelles (SEY)	2	2	2	6
6	Algeria (ALG)	0	5	4	9
7	Mauritius (MRI)	0	3	2	5
8	Ivory Coast (CIV)	0	1	0	1
9	Madagascar (MAD)	0	0	6	6
10	Cameroon (CMR)	0	0	4	4
10	Kenya (KEN)	0	0	4	4
12	Benin (BEN)	0	0	1	1
12	Togo (TOG)	0	0	1	1
Totals (13 entries)		59	59	58	176

== Medal summary ==
=== Men ===
Event	Gold		Silver		Bronze	
56 kg
Snatch	Amine Bouhijbha; Tunisia	108 kg	Amor Fenni; Algeria	103 kg	Eric Andriantsitohaina; Madagascar	100 kg
Clean & Jerk	Amine Bouhijbha; Tunisia	140 kg	Rasaq Taniamowo; Nigeria	131 kg	Eric Andriantsitohaina; Madagascar	130 kg
Total	Amine Bouhijbha; Tunisia	248 kg	Rasaq Taniamowo; Nigeria	231 kg	Eric Andriantsitohaina; Madagascar	230 kg
62 kg
Snatch	Ahmed Ahmed Mohamed; Egypt	132 kg	Ahmed Ataf Moustafa; Egypt	125 kg	Tojonirina Andriantsitohaina; Madagascar	115 kg
Clean & Jerk	Ahmed Ahmed Mohamed; Egypt	158 kg	Ahmed Ataf Moustafa; Egypt	156 kg	Tojonirina Andriantsitohaina; Madagascar	142 kg
Total	Ahmed Ahmed Mohamed; Egypt	290 kg	Ahmed Ataf Moustafa; Egypt	281 kg	Tojonirina Andriantsitohaina; Madagascar	257 kg
69 kg
Snatch	Karem Ben Hnia; Tunisia	135	Yinka Ayenuwa; Nigeria	130	Ademola John Oginni; Nigeria	127
Clean & Jerk	Karem Ben Hnia; Tunisia	173	Yinka Ayenuwa; Nigeria	170	Ademola John Oginni; Nigeria	162
Total	Karem Ben Hnia; Tunisia	308	Yinka Ayenuwa; Nigeria	300	Ademola John Oginni; Nigeria	289
77 kg
Snatch	Rami Bahloul; Tunisia	145 kg	Mamdum Dickson Seldum; Nigeria	145 kg	Hani Maatoug Cheridi; Libya	138 kg
Clean & Jerk	Ibrahim Ramadhan; Egypt	177 kg	Rami Bahloul; Tunisia	175 kg	Mamdum Dickson Seldum; Nigeria	175 kg
Total	Rami Bahloul; Tunisia	320 kg	Mamdum Dickson Seldum; Nigeria	320 kg	Hani Maatoug Cheridi; Libya	298 kg
85 kg
Snatch	Ammar Hassen; Egypt	157	Ali Kekli; Libya	155	Valery Nana Yakam; Cameroon	140
Clean & Jerk	Ali Kekli; Libya	197	Ammar Hassen; Egypt	195	Micheal Anyolewachi; Nigeria	174
Total	Ali Kekli; Libya	354	Ammar Hassen; Egypt	352	Hossain Fardjallah; Algeria	314
94 kg
Snatch	Ragab Abdelhay; Egypt	160	Messaoud Saddem; Algeria	150	Marouen El Ayyen; Libya	140
Clean & Jerk	Ragab Abdelhay; Egypt	205	Messaoud Saddem; Algeria	183	Marouen El Ayyen; Libya	182
Total	Ragab Abdelhay; Egypt	365	Messaoud Saddem; Algeria	333	Marouen El Ayyen; Libya	322
105 kg
Snatch	Jaber Farhan; Egypt	172 kg	Abdelmoneim Ouaddani; Libya	161	Tchouden Verlaine; Cameroon	135
Clean & Jerk	Jaber Farhan; Egypt	205 kg	Abdelmoneim Ouaddani; Libya	191	Joseph Ndubusi Paul; Nigeria	185
Total	Jaber Farhan; Egypt	377 kg	Abdelmoneim Ouaddani; Libya	352	Joseph Ndubusi Paul; Nigeria	315
+105 kg
Snatch	Mohamed Masoud; Egypt	200	Ahmed Mohamed; Egypt	185	Hamza Sanoune; Algeria	150
Clean & Jerk	Mohamed Masoud; Egypt	241	Ahmed Mohamed; Egypt	240	Yvan Pierrot; Mauritius	185
Total	Mohamed Masoud; Egypt	441	Ahmed Mohamed; Egypt	425	Yvan Pierrot; Mauritius	331

=== Women ===
Event	Gold		Silver		Bronze	
48 kg
Snatch	Heba Saleh Mahmoud Ahmed; Egypt	70 kg	Zohra Chihi; Tunisia	68 kg	Monica Uweh; Nigeria	68 kg
Clean & Jerk	Heba Saleh Mahmoud Ahmed; Egypt	88 kg	Monica Uweh; Nigeria	83 kg	Zohra Chihi; Tunisia	81 kg
Total	Heba Saleh Mahmoud Ahmed; Egypt	158 kg	Monica Uweh; Nigeria	151 kg	Zohra Chihi; Tunisia	149 kg
53 kg
Snatch	~~Onuah Elizabeth~~; ~~Nigeria~~	85 kg	Roilya Ranaivosoa; Mauritius	80 kg	Basma Emad Ibrahim; Egypt	78 kg
Clean & Jerk	Basma Emad Ibrahim; Egypt	104 kg	Roilya Ranaivosoa; Mauritius	103 kg	~~Onuah Elizabeth~~; ~~Nigeria~~	103 kg
Total	~~Onuah Elizabeth~~; ~~Nigeria~~	188 kg	Roilya Ranaivosoa; Mauritius	183 kg	Basma Emad Ibrahim; Egypt	182 kg
58 kg
Snatch	Onyeka Azike; Nigeria	83 kg	~~Mabrina Ruby~~; ~~Seychelles~~	80 kg	~~Zeinab Mohamed~~; ~~Egypt~~	76 kg
Clean & Jerk	~~Mabrina Ruby~~; ~~Seychelles~~	109 kg	Onyeka Azike; Nigeria	105 kg	~~Zeinab Mohamed~~; ~~Egypt~~	101 kg
Total	~~Mabrina Ruby~~; ~~Seychelles~~	189 kg	Onyeka Azike; Nigeria	188 kg	~~Zeinab Mohamed~~; ~~Egypt~~	177 kg
63 kg
Snatch	Esraa El-Sayed; Egypt	96 kg	Victoria Adesanmi; Nigeria	95 kg	Clementina Agricole; Seychelles	91 kg
Clean & Jerk	Victoria Adesanmi; Nigeria	116 kg	Clementina Agricole; Seychelles	115 kg	Esraa El-Sayed; Egypt	112 kg
Total	Victoria Adesanmi; Nigeria	211 kg	Esraa El-Sayed; Egypt	208 kg	Clementina Agricole; Seychelles	206 kg
69 kg
Snatch	Sara Ahmed; Egypt	102 kg	Winifred Eze Ndidi; Nigeria	90 kg	Mercy Apondi Obiero; Kenya	70 kg
Clean & Jerk	Sara Ahmed; Egypt	132 kg	Winifred Eze Ndidi; Nigeria	120 kg	Mercy Apondi Obiero; Kenya	100 kg
Total	Sara Ahmed; Egypt	234 kg	Winifred Eze Ndidi; Nigeria	210 kg	Mercy Apondi Obiero; Kenya	170 kg
75 kg
Snatch	Otunlabilkis Abiodun; Nigeria	102 kg	Ghada Hassine; Tunisia	100 kg	Dina Khaled; Egypt	98 kg
Clean & Jerk	Otunlabilkis Abiodun; Nigeria	130 kg	Ghada Hassine; Tunisia	122 kg	Dina Khaled; Egypt	121 kg
Total	Otunlabilkis Abiodun; Nigeria	232 kg	Ghada Hassine; Tunisia	222 kg	Dina Khaled; Egypt	219 kg
+75 kg
Snatch	Shaimaa Khalaf; Egypt	123 kg	Maryam Usman; Nigeria	118 kg	Yousra Dhiab; Tunisia	112 kg
Clean & Jerk	Shaimaa Khalaf; Egypt	155 kg	Maryam Usman; Nigeria	150 kg	Yousra Dhiab; Tunisia	135 kg
Total	Shaimaa Khalaf; Egypt	278 kg	Maryam Usman; Nigeria	268 kg	Yousra Dhiab; Tunisia	247 kg

== Powerlifting ==
=== Men ===
Event	Gold		Silver		Bronze	
49 kg	Yakubu Adesokan (NGA)	182.5 kg	Ahmed Hadj Biour (ALG)	131 kg	Alion Bawa (TOG)	110 kg
54 kg	Roland Ezuruike (NGA)	182 kg	Alidou Diamoutene (CIV)	170 kg	Taha Abdelmagid (EGY)	165 kg
59 kg	Sherif Othman (EGY)	210 kg	Anthony Ulonnam (NGA)	190 kg	Conrat Atangana (CMR)	160 kg
65 kg	Olumide Kehinde (NGA)	214 kg	Shaaban Ibrahim (EGY)	196 kg	Hocine Bettir (ALG)	183 kg
72 kg	Mohamed El Elfi (EGY)	212 kg	Nnamdi Innocent (NGA)	200 kg	Cosme Akpovi (BEN)	170 kg
80 kg	Metwaly Methana (EGY)	220 kg	Tolu-Lope Taiwo (NGA)	192 kg	Maurice Biwole Nkodo (CMR)	166 kg
88 kg	Hany Abdelhady (EGY)	233 kg	Opeyemi jegede (NGA)	204 kg		
97 & 107 kg	Mohamed Eldib (EGY)	204.57 pts	Abdulazeez Ibrahim (NGA)	194.68 pts	Mohamed Elsayed (EGY)	191.21 pts

=== Women ===
Event	Gold		Silver		Bronze	
41 kg	Nawal Ramadan (EGY)	92 kg	Nsini Jonah Ben (NGA)	90 kg	Hellen Nwawira Kariuki (KEN)	65 kg
45 kg	Latifat Tijani (NGA)	98 kg	Zeineb Oteify (EGY)	95 kg	Samira Guerioua (ALG)	82 kg
55 & 61 kg	Esther Oyema (NGA)	139.32 pts	Fatma Omar (EGY)	137.34 pts	Lucy Ejike (NGA)	136.50 pts
67 & 73 kg	Ndidi Nwosu (NGA)	122.50 pts	Amal Mahmoud (EGY)	112.42 pts	Amany Ali (EGY)	108.12 pts
79 kg	Bose Omolayo (NGA)	137 kg	Geehan Hassan (EGY)	120 kg	Sahar Elgnemi (LBY)	90 kg
-86 & +86 kg	Loveline Obiji (NGA)	125.83 pts	Randa Mahmoud (EGY)	121.04 pts	Precious Orji (NGA)	117.25 pts
