= Weightlifting at the 2007 All-Africa Games =

Weightlifting at the 2007 All-Africa Games in Algiers was held between July 15–20, 2007.

== Medal summary ==
=== Men ===
Event	Gold		Silver		Bronze	
56 kg
Snatch	Ahmed Saad; Egypt	107 kg	Nafa Benami; Algeria	105 kg	Emanuel Obong; Nigeria	105 kg
Clean & Jerk	Ahmed Saad; Egypt	136 kg	Emanuel Obong; Nigeria	135 kg	Souhil Mairif; Algeria	127 kg
Total	Ahmed Saad; Egypt	243 kg	Emanuel Obong; Nigeria	240 kg	Nafa Benami; Algeria	230 kg
62 kg
Snatch	Mohamed Abdelbaki; Egypt	130 kg	Simon Ngamba; Cameroon	115 kg	Gbenga Olupona; Nigeria	115 kg
Clean & Jerk	Yinka Ayenuwa; Nigeria	160 kg	Mohamed Abdelbaki; Egypt	157 kg	Gbenga Olupona; Nigeria	156 kg
Total	Mohamed Abdelbaki; Egypt	287 kg	Yinka Ayenuwa; Nigeria	273 kg	Gbenga Olupona; Nigeria	271 kg
69 kg
Snatch	Bernardin Matam; Cameroon	133 kg	Peter Eichie; Nigeria	132 kg	Isiaka Aliyu; Nigeria	131 kg
Clean & Jerk	Madkour Mohamed; Egypt	166 kg	Isiaka Aliyu; Nigeria	165 kg	Bernardin Matam; Cameroon	160 kg
Total	Isiaka Aliyu; Nigeria	296 kg	Madkour Mohamed; Egypt	294 kg	Bernardin Matam; Cameroon	293 kg
77 kg
Snatch	Felix Ekpo; Nigeria	152 kg	Ibrahim Abdelbaki; Egypt	150 kg	Sarham Nizar; Tunisia	137 kg
Clean & Jerk	Felix Ekpo; Nigeria	181 kg	Ibrahim Abdelbaki; Egypt	178 kg	Ali el-Kikli; Libya	162 kg
Total	Felix Ekpo; Nigeria	333 kg	Ibrahim Abdelbaki; Egypt	328 kg	Ali el-Kikli; Libya	294 kg
85 kg
Snatch	Doghman Hamali; Tunisia	156 kg	Mohamed Eshtiwi; Libya	155 kg	Brice Batchaya; Cameroon	150 kg
Clean & Jerk	Mahmoud El-Haddad; Egypt	193 kg	Mohamed Eshtiwi; Libya	191 kg	Doghman Hamali; Tunisia	185 kg
Total	Mohamed Eshtiwi; Libya	346 kg	Mahmoud El-Haddad; Egypt	341 kg	Doghman Hamali; Tunisia	341 kg
94 kg
Snatch	Mohammed El Nagar; Egypt	153 kg	Abdurrahman Shtewi; Libya	150 kg	Okoli Chukwuka; Nigeria	146 kg
Clean & Jerk	Mohammed El Nagar; Egypt	206 kg	Abdurrahman Shtewi; Libya	177 kg	Sami El-Kaderi; Tunisia	176 kg
Total	Mohammed El Nagar; Egypt	359 kg	Abdurrahman Shtewi; Libya	327 kg	Sami El-Kaderi; Tunisia	319 kg
105 kg
Snatch	Abdelrahman El-Sayed; Egypt	171 kg	Hanachi Moez; Tunisia	170 kg	Toufik Keroui; Algeria	140 kg
Clean & Jerk	Abdelrahman El-Sayed; Egypt	200 kg	Hanachi Moez; Tunisia	190 kg	Salaheddin el-Adhem; Libya	180 kg
Total	Abdelrahman El-Sayed; Egypt	371 kg	Hanachi Moez; Tunisia	360 kg	Toufik Keroui; Algeria	300 kg
+105 kg
Snatch	Mohamed Ehssan Massoud; Egypt	160 kg	Mowafg Daw; Libya	155 kg	Freder Fokejou; Cameroon	150 kg
Clean & Jerk	Mohamed Ehssan Massoud; Egypt	205 kg	Mowafg Daw; Libya	182 kg	Freder Fokejou; Cameroon	175 kg
Total	Mohamed Ehssan Massoud; Egypt	365 kg	Mowafg Daw; Libya	337 kg	Freder Fokejou; Cameroon	317 kg

=== Women ===
Event	Gold		Silver		Bronze	
48 kg
Snatch	Onyeka Azike; Nigeria	72 kg	Portia Vries; South Africa	70 kg	Ehsseinia Henda; Tunisia	65 kg
Clean & Jerk	Onyeka Azike; Nigeria	91 kg	Portia Vries; South Africa	88 kg	Dalila Acheria; Algeria	87 kg
Total	Onyeka Azike; Nigeria	163 kg	Portia Vries; South Africa	158 kg	Dalila Acheria; Algeria	148 kg
53 kg
Snatch	Patience Lawal; Nigeria	82 kg	Hamed Aaya; Egypt	71 kg	Safia Kouri; Algeria	70 kg
Clean & Jerk	Patience Lawal; Nigeria	112 kg	Hamed Aaya; Egypt	90 kg	Safia Kouri; Algeria	85 kg
Total	Patience Lawal; Nigeria	194 kg	Hamed Aaya; Egypt	161 kg	Safia Kouri; Algeria	155 kg
58 kg
Snatch	Margret Uwah; Nigeria	90 kg	Arbi Ahlen; Tunisia	78 kg	Clementina Agricole; Seychelles	77 kg
Clean & Jerk	Margret Uwah; Nigeria	107 kg	Arbi Ahlen; Tunisia	101 kg	Clementina Agricole; Seychelles	97 kg
Total	Margret Uwah; Nigeria	197 kg	Arbi Ahlen; Tunisia	179 kg	Clementina Agricole; Seychelles	174 kg
63 kg
Snatch	Esmat Ahmed; Egypt	93 kg	Agatha Egwudike; Nigeria	91 kg	Hanan El-Ouerfeli; Tunisia	90 kg
Clean & Jerk	Esmat Ahmed; Egypt	115 kg	Agatha Egwudike; Nigeria	112 kg	Hanan El-Ouerfeli; Tunisia	107 kg
Total	Esmat Ahmed; Egypt	208 kg	Agatha Egwudike; Nigeria	203 kg	Hanan El-Ouerfeli; Tunisia	197 kg
69 kg
Snatch	Leila Lassouani; Algeria	95 kg	Janet Thelermont; Seychelles	95 kg	Hebat Ahmed; Egypt	94 kg
Clean & Jerk	Hebat Ahmed; Egypt	118 kg	Leila Lassouani; Algeria	117 kg	Joubaba Ben Chobba; Tunisia	117 kg
Total	Leila Lassouani; Algeria	212 kg	Hebat Ahmed; Egypt	212 kg	Janet Thelermont; Seychelles	200 kg
75 kg
Snatch	Hadiza Zakare; Nigeria	95 kg	Sara Nagm; Egypt	89 kg	Asma El-Raziki; Tunisia	88 kg
Clean & Jerk	Hadiza Zakare; Nigeria	125 kg	Asma El-Raziki; Tunisia	115 kg	Sara Nagm; Egypt	114 kg
Total	Hadiza Zakare; Nigeria	220 kg	Asma El-Raziki; Tunisia	203 kg	Sara Nagm; Egypt	203 kg
+75 kg
Snatch	Nahla Ramadan; Egypt	117 kg	Mariam Usman; Nigeria	110 kg	Afaf Abdel Tahab; Egypt	100 kg
Clean & Jerk	Nahla Ramadan; Egypt	151 kg	Mariam Usman; Nigeria	138 kg	Afaf Abdel Tahab; Egypt	125 kg
Total	Nahla Ramadan; Egypt	268 kg	Mariam Usman; Nigeria	248 kg	Afaf Abdel Tahab; Egypt	225 kg

=== Doping cases ===
Blessed Udoh who won 3 medals in the women's 48 kg, tested positive after the competition.

== Medal table ==
Ranking by Big (Total result) medals

Key:

* Host nation (Algeria)

Rank	Nation	Gold	Silver	Bronze	Total
1	Egypt (EGY)	7	5	2	14
2	Nigeria (NGR)	6	4	1	11
3	Libya (LBA)	1	2	1	4
4	Algeria (ALG)*	1	0	4	5
5	Tunisia (TUN)	0	3	3	6
6	South Africa (RSA)	0	1	0	1
7	Cameroon (CMR)	0	0	2	2
7	Seychelles (SEY)	0	0	2	2
Totals (8 entries)		15	15	15	45
