= Weightlifting at the 2013 Mediterranean Games – Women's 63 kg =

The women's 63 kg competition of the weightlifting events at the 2013 Mediterranean Games in Mersin, Turkey, was held on June 23 at the Erdemli Sports Hall.

Each lifter performed in both the snatch and clean and jerk lifts, with the final score being the sum of the lifter's best result in each. The athlete received three attempts in each of the two lifts; the score for the lift was the heaviest weight successfully lifted. This weightlifting event was the lightest men's event at the weightlifting competition, limiting competitors to a maximum of 63 kilograms of body mass.

== Schedule ==
All times are Eastern European Summer Time (UTC+3).

| Date | Time | Round |
|---|---|---|
| June 23, 2013 | 15:00 | Final |

== Results ==
6 athletes from five countries will take part.

=== Snatch ===
| Rank | Name | Group | B.weight (kg) | Snatch (kg) |
|---|---|---|---|---|
| 1st place, gold medalist(s) | Sibel Şimşek (TUR) | A | 62.60 | 100 |
| 2nd place, silver medalist(s) | Romela Begaj (ALB) | A | 62.65 | 99 |
| 3rd place, bronze medalist(s) | Sara Ahmed (EGY) | A | 61.65 | 92 |
| 4 | Giorgia Bordignon (ITA) | A | 62.30 | 85 |
| 5 | Agnes Chiquet (FRA) | A | 62.35 | 84 |
| 6 | Silvana Vukas (SRB) | A | 61.20 | 70 |

=== Clean & Jerk ===
| Rank | Name | Group | B.weight (kg) | Clean & Jerk (kg) |
|---|---|---|---|---|
| 1st place, gold medalist(s) | Sara Ahmed (EGY) | A | 61.65 | 124 |
| 2nd place, silver medalist(s) | Sibel Şimşek (TUR) | A | 62.60 | 121 |
| 3rd place, bronze medalist(s) | Romela Begaj (ALB) | A | 62.65 | 117 |
| 4 | Agnes Chiquet (FRA) | A | 62.35 | 103 |
| 5 | Giorgia Bordignon (ITA) | A | 62.30 | 100 |
| 6 | Silvana Vukas (SRB) | A | 61.20 | 95 |
