= Weightlifting at the 2013 Mediterranean Games – Men's 77 kg =

The men's 77 kg competition of the weightlifting events at the 2013 Mediterranean Games in Mersin, Turkey, was held on June 23 at the Erdemli Sports Hall.

Each lifter performed in both the snatch and clean and jerk lifts, with the final score being the sum of the lifter's best result in each. The athlete received three attempts in each of the two lifts; the score for the lift was the heaviest weight successfully lifted. This weightlifting event was the lightest men's event at the weightlifting competition, limiting competitors to a maximum of 77 kilograms of body mass.

== Schedule ==
All times are Eastern European Summer Time (UTC+3).

Date	Time	Round
June 23, 2013	12:00	Final

== Results ==
9 athletes from five countries will take part.

=== Snatch ===
Rank	Name	Group	B.weight (kg)	Snatch (kg)
1st place, gold medalist(s)	Ramzi Bahloul (TUN)	A	76.85	157
2nd place, silver medalist(s)	Semih Yağcı (TUR)	A	76.90	151
3rd place, bronze medalist(s)	Mohamed Sultan (EGY)	A	76.45	150
4	Ibrahim Abdelbaki (EGY)	A	76.75	150
5	Housseyn Fardjallah (ALG)	A	76.15	147
6	Musaab Alosh (LBA)	A	76.25	142
7	Emmanouil Marianakis (GRE)	A	76.35	141
8	Alejandro Gonzalez Baez (ESP)	A	76.25	140
9	Rodmar Pulis (MLT)	A	76.60	105

=== Clean & Jerk ===
Rank	Name	Group	B.weight (kg)	Clean & Jerk (kg)
1st place, gold medalist(s)	Ibrahim Abdelbaki (EGY)	A	76.75	195
2nd place, silver medalist(s)	Ramzi Bahloul (TUN)	A	76.85	195
3rd place, bronze medalist(s)	Mohamed Sultan (EGY)	A	76.45	188
4	Alejandro Gonzalez Baez (ESP)	A	76.25	180
5	Housseyn Fardjallah (ALG)	A	76.15	176
6	Emmanouil Marianakis (GRE)	A	76.35	167
—	Semih Yağcı (TUR)	A	76.90	—
—	Musaab Alosh (LBA)	A	76.25	—
—	Rodmar Pulis (MLT)	A	76.60	—
