= List of Nigerian records in Olympic weightlifting =

Nigerian records in Olympic weightlifting

The following are the national records in Olympic weightlifting in Nigeria. Records are maintained in each weight class for the snatch lift, clean and jerk lift, and the total for both lifts by the Nigeria Weightlifting Federation.

== Current records ==
=== Men ===
| Event | Record | Athlete | Date | Meet | Place | Ref |
60 kg
| Snatch | | | | | | |
| Clean & Jerk | | | | | | |
| Total | | | | | | |
65 kg
| Snatch | | | | | | |
| Clean & Jerk | | | | | | |
| Total | | | | | | |
71 kg
| Snatch | 151 kg | Edidiong Umoafia | 9 November 2025 | Islamic Solidarity Games | Riyadh, Saudi Arabia | |
| Clean & Jerk | 175 kg | Edidiong Umoafia | 9 November 2025 | Islamic Solidarity Games | Riyadh, Saudi Arabia | |
| Total | 326 kg | Edidiong Umoafia | 9 November 2025 | Islamic Solidarity Games | Riyadh, Saudi Arabia | |
79 kg
| Snatch | 135 kg | Adedapo Opadeji | 27 July 2026 | Commonwealth Games | Glasgow, United Kingdom | |
| Clean & Jerk | | | | | | |
| Total | | | | | | |
88 kg
| Snatch | | | | | | |
| Clean & Jerk | | | | | | |
| Total | | | | | | |
94 kg
| Snatch | 150 kg | Desmond Akano | 11 November 2025 | Islamic Solidarity Games | Riyadh, Saudi Arabia | |
| Clean & Jerk | 190 kg | Desmond Akano | 11 November 2025 | Islamic Solidarity Games | Riyadh, Saudi Arabia | |
| Total | 340 kg | Desmond Akano | 11 November 2025 | Islamic Solidarity Games | Riyadh, Saudi Arabia | |
110 kg
| Snatch | | | | | | |
| Clean & Jerk | | | | | | |
| Total | | | | | | |
+110 kg
| Snatch | | | | | | |
| Clean & Jerk | | | | | | |
| Total | | | | | | |

=== Women ===
| Event | Record | Athlete | Date | Meet | Place | Ref |
48 kg
| Snatch | 75 kg | Ruth Nyong Asouquo | 26 July 2026 | Commonwealth Games | Glasgow, United Kingdom | |
| Clean & Jerk | 95 kg | Ruth Nyong Asouquo | 25 August 2025 | Commonwealth Junior Championships | Ahmedabad, India | |
| Total | 168 kg | Ruth Nyong Asouquo | 26 July 2026 | Commonwealth Games | Glasgow, United Kingdom | |
53 kg
| Snatch | 93 kg | Onome Didih | 27 July 2026 | Commonwealth Games | Glasgow, United Kingdom | |
| Clean & Jerk | 113 kg | Onome Didih | 27 July 2026 | Commonwealth Games | Glasgow, United Kingdom | |
| Total | 206 kg | Onome Didih | 27 July 2026 | Commonwealth Games | Glasgow, United Kingdom | |
58 kg
| Snatch | 103 kg | Rafiatu Lawal | 27 July 2026 | Commonwealth Games | Glasgow, United Kingdom | |
| Clean & Jerk | 128 kg | Rafiatu Lawal | 4 October 2025 | World Championships | Førde, Norway | |
| Total | 229 kg | Rafiatu Lawal | 4 October 2025 | World Championships | Førde, Norway | |
63 kg
| Snatch | 95 kg | Ruth Imoleayo Ayodele | 10 November 2025 | Islamic Solidarity Games | Riyadh, Saudi Arabia | |
| Clean & Jerk | 117 kg | Ruth Imoleayo Ayodele | 10 November 2025 | Islamic Solidarity Games | Riyadh, Saudi Arabia | |
| Total | 212 kg | Ruth Imoleayo Ayodele | 10 November 2025 | Islamic Solidarity Games | Riyadh, Saudi Arabia | |
69 kg
| Snatch | 110 kg | Islamiyat Yusuf | 10 November 2025 | Islamic Solidarity Games | Riyadh, Saudi Arabia | |
| Clean & Jerk | | | | | | |
| Total | | | | | | |
77 kg
| Snatch | 116 kg | Sarah Matthew | 11 November 2025 | Islamic Solidarity Games | Riyadh, Saudi Arabia | |
| Clean & Jerk | 129 kg | Sarah Matthew | 11 November 2025 | Islamic Solidarity Games | Riyadh, Saudi Arabia | |
| Total | 245 kg | Sarah Matthew | 11 November 2025 | Islamic Solidarity Games | Riyadh, Saudi Arabia | |
86 kg
| Snatch | | | | | | |
| Clean & Jerk | | | | | | |
| Total | | | | | | |
+86 kg
| Snatch | | | | | | |
| Clean & Jerk | | | | | | |
| Total | | | | | | |

== Historical records ==
=== Men (2018–2025) ===
| Event | Record | Athlete | Date | Meet | Place | Ref |
55 kg
| Snatch | 95 kg | King Kalu | 25 August 2019 | African Games | Rabat, Morocco | |
| Clean & Jerk | 123 kg | King Kalu | 25 August 2019 | African Games | Rabat, Morocco | |
| Total | 218 kg | King Kalu | 25 August 2019 | African Games | Rabat, Morocco | |
61 kg
| Snatch | 120 kg | Emmanuel Appah | 26 August 2019 | African Games | Rabat, Morocco | |
| Clean & Jerk | 151 kg | Emmanuel Appah | 26 August 2019 | African Games | Rabat, Morocco | |
| Total | 271 kg | Emmanuel Appah | 26 August 2019 | African Games | Rabat, Morocco | |
67 kg
| Snatch | 135 kg | Edidiong Umoafia | 10 December 2021 | World Championships | Tashkent, Uzbekistan | |
| Clean & Jerk | 165 kg | Edidiong Umoafia | 11 March 2024 | African Games | Accra, Ghana | |
| Total | 300 kg | Edidiong Umoafia | 11 March 2024 | African Games | Accra, Ghana | |
73 kg
| Snatch | 147 kg | Edidiong Umoafia | 4 April 2024 | World Cup | Phuket, Thailand | |
| Clean & Jerk | 172 kg | Edidiong Umoafia | 4 April 2024 | World Cup | Phuket, Thailand | |
| Total | 319 kg | Edidiong Umoafia | 4 April 2024 | World Cup | Phuket, Thailand | |
81 kg
| Snatch | 146 kg | Mamdum Seldum | 27 August 2019 | African Games | Rabat, Morocco | |
| Clean & Jerk | 178 kg | Mamdum Seldum | 27 August 2019 | African Games | Rabat, Morocco | |
| Total | 324 kg | Mamdum Seldum | 27 August 2019 | African Games | Rabat, Morocco | |
89 kg
| Snatch | 149 kg | Desmond Akano | 28 August 2019 | African Games | Rabat, Morocco | |
| Clean & Jerk | 193 kg | Desmond Akano | 10 September 2023 | World Championships | Riyadh, Saudi Arabia | |
| Total | 338 kg | Desmond Akano | 10 September 2023 | World Championships | Riyadh, Saudi Arabia | |
96 kg
| Snatch | 145 kg | Desmond Akano | 13 March 2024 | African Games | Accra, Ghana | |
| Clean & Jerk | 191 kg | Desmond Akano | 13 March 2024 | African Games | Accra, Ghana | |
| Total | 336 kg | Desmond Akano | 13 March 2024 | African Games | Accra, Ghana | |
102 kg
| Snatch | 158 kg | Patrick Olawale Barde | 29 August 2019 | African Games | Rabat, Morocco | |
| Clean & Jerk | 190 kg | Abayomi Adeyemi | 13 March 2024 | African Games | Accra, Ghana | |
| Total | 343 kg | Patrick Olawale Barde | 29 August 2019 | African Games | Rabat, Morocco | |
109 kg
| Snatch | | | | | | |
| Clean & Jerk | | | | | | |
| Total | | | | | | |
+109 kg
| Snatch | 152 kg | Lucky Joseph | 14 March 2024 | African Games | Accra, Ghana | |
| Clean & Jerk | 190 kg | Lucky Joseph | 14 March 2024 | African Games | Accra, Ghana | |
| Total | 342 kg | Lucky Joseph | 14 March 2024 | African Games | Accra, Ghana | |

=== Women (2018–2025) ===
| Event | Record | Athlete | Date | Meet | Place | Ref |
45 kg
| Snatch | | | | | | |
| Clean & Jerk | | | | | | |
| Total | | | | | | |
49 kg
| Snatch | 75 kg | Stella Kingsley | 30 July 2022 | Commonwealth Games | Marston Green, United Kingdom | |
| Clean & Jerk | 96 kg | Stella Kingsley | 8 December 2021 | World Championships | Tashkent, Uzbekistan | |
| Total | 170 kg | Stella Kingsley | 30 July 2022 | Commonwealth Games | Marston Green, United Kingdom | |
55 kg
| Snatch | 92 kg | Adijat Olarinoye, | 30 July 2022 | Commonwealth Games | Marston Green, United Kingdom | |
| Clean & Jerk | 116 kg | Adijat Olarinoye | 26 August 2019 | African Games | Rabat, Morocco | |
| Total | 203 kg | Adijat Olarinoye | 9 December 2021 | World Championships | Tashkent, Uzbekistan | |
59 kg
| Snatch | 101 kg | Rafiatu Lawal | 3 April 2024 | World Cup | Phuket, Thailand | |
| Clean & Jerk | 130 kg | Rafiatu Lawal | 8 August 2024 | Olympic Games | Paris, France | |
| Total | 230 kg | Rafiatu Lawal | 8 August 2024 | Olympic Games | Paris, France | |
64 kg
| Snatch | 100 kg | Ruth Ayodele | 10 September 2023 | World Championships | Riyadh, Saudi Arabia | |
| Clean & Jerk | 122 kg | Ruth Ayodele | 10 September 2023 | World Championships | Riyadh, Saudi Arabia | |
| Total | 222 kg | Ruth Ayodele | 10 September 2023 | World Championships | Riyadh, Saudi Arabia | |
71 kg
| Snatch | 103 kg | Joy Ogbonne Eze | 7 April 2024 | World Cup | Phuket, Thailand | |
| Clean & Jerk | 136 kg | Joy Ogbonne Eze | 7 April 2024 | World Cup | Phuket, Thailand | |
| Total | 239 kg | Joy Ogbonne Eze | 7 April 2024 | World Cup | Phuket, Thailand | |
76 kg
| Snatch | 96 kg | Liadi Taiwo | 2 August 2022 | Commonwealth Games | Marston Green, United Kingdom | |
| Clean & Jerk | 120 kg | Liadi Taiwo | 2 August 2022 | Commonwealth Games | Marston Green, United Kingdom | |
| Total | 216 kg | Liadi Taiwo | 2 August 2022 | Commonwealth Games | Marston Green, United Kingdom | |
81 kg
| Snatch | 93 kg | Bilikis Abiocun | April 2019 | African Championships | Cairo, Egypt | |
| Clean & Jerk | 125 kg | Bilikis Abiocun | April 2019 | African Championships | Cairo, Egypt | |
| Total | 218 kg | Bilikis Abiocun | April 2019 | African Championships | Cairo, Egypt | |
87 kg
| Snatch | 103 kg | Mary Osijo | 14 March 2024 | African Games | Accra, Ghana | |
| Clean & Jerk | 128 kg | Mary Osijo | 14 March 2024 | African Games | Accra, Ghana | |
| Total | 231 kg | Mary Osijo | 14 March 2024 | African Games | Accra, Ghana | |
+87 kg
| Snatch | | | | | | |
| Clean & Jerk | | | | | | |
| Total | | | | | | |

=== Men (1998–2018) ===
| Event | Record | Athlete | Date | Meet | Place | Ref |
-56 kg
| Snatch | | | | | | |
| Clean & Jerk | | | | | | |
| Total | | | | | | |
-62 kg
| Snatch | 112 kg | Favour Agboro | 5 April 2018 | Commonwealth Games | Gold Coast, Australia | |
| Clean & Jerk | 156 kg | Favour Agboro | 5 April 2018 | Commonwealth Games | Gold Coast, Australia | |
| Total | 267 kg | Favour Agboro | 5 April 2018 | Commonwealth Games | Gold Coast, Australia | |
-69 kg
| Snatch | | | | | | |
| Clean & Jerk | | | | | | |
| Total | | | | | | |
-77 kg
| Snatch | | | | | | |
| Clean & Jerk | 185 kg | Dare Alabi | October 2003 | All-Africa Games | Abuja, Nigeria | |
| Total | | | | | | |
-85 kg
| Snatch | | | | | | |
| Clean & Jerk | | | | | | |
| Total | | | | | | |
-94 kg
| Snatch | | | | | | |
| Clean & Jerk | | | | | | |
| Total | | | | | | |
-105 kg
| Snatch | | | | | | |
| Clean & Jerk | | | | | | |
| Total | | | | | | |
+105 kg
| Snatch | | | | | | |
| Clean & Jerk | | | | | | |
| Total | | | | | | |

=== Women (1998–2018) ===
| Event | Record | Athlete | Date | Meet | Place | Ref |
-48 kg
| Snatch | 75 kg | Blessed Udoh | 14 August 2004 | Olympic Games | Athens, Greece | |
| Clean & Jerk | 105 kg | Blessed Udoh | 14 August 2004 | Olympic Games | Athens, Greece | |
| Total | 180 kg | Blessed Udoh | 14 August 2004 | Olympic Games | Athens, Greece | |
-53 kg
| Snatch | 80 kg | Chinenye Fidelis | 6 November 2011 | World Championships | Paris, France | |
| Clean & Jerk | 115 kg | Chinenye Fidelis | 6 November 2011 | World Championships | Paris, France | |
| Total | 202 kg | Chineye Fidelis | 31 March 2012 | African Championships | Nairobi, Kenia | |
-58 kg
| Snatch | 95 kg | Franca Gbodo | 16 August 2004 | Olympic Games | Athens, Greece | |
| Clean & Jerk | 122 kg | Chinenye Fidelis | 10 May 2016 | African Championships | Yaoundé, Cameroon | |
| Total | 212 kg | Franca Gbodo | 16 August 2004 | Olympic Games | Athens, Greece | |
-63 kg
| Snatch | 96 kg | Caro Okouokha | 30 November 2012 | XVIII National Sports Festival | Lagos, Nigeria | |
| Clean & Jerk | | | | | | |
| Total | 214 kg | Caro Okouokha | 30 November 2012 | XVIII National Sports Festival | Lagos, Nigeria | |
-69 kg
| Snatch | | | | | | |
| Clean & Jerk | | | | | | |
| Total | | | | | | |
-75 kg
| Snatch | 110 kg | Hadiza Zakari | 9 October 2010 | Commonwealth Games | Delhi, India | |
| Clean & Jerk | 140 kg | Ruth Ogbeifo | 20 September 2000 | Olympic Games | Sydney, Australia | |
| Total | | | | | | |
90 kg
| Snatch | 112 kg | Bilkisu Musa | 27 November 1999 | World Championships | Piraeus, Greece | |
| Clean & Jerk | | | | | | |
| Total | | | | | | |
+90 kg
| Snatch | 129 kg | Mariam Usman | 5 August 2012 | Olympic Games | London, United Kingdom | |
| Clean & Jerk | 156 kg | Mariam Usman | 13 November 2011 | World Championships | Paris, France | |
| Total | 281 kg | Mariam Usman | 29 March 2012 | African Championships | (Kenya) Nairobi, Kenia | |
