= Weightlifting at the 2013 Mediterranean Games – Men's 69 kg =

The men's 69 kg competition of the weightlifting events at the 2013 Mediterranean Games in Mersin, Turkey, was held on June 22 at the Erdemli Sports Hall.

Each lifter performed in both the snatch and clean and jerk lifts, with the final score being the sum of the lifter's best result in each. The athlete received three attempts in each of the two lifts; the score for the lift was the heaviest weight successfully lifted. This weightlifting event was the lightest men's event at the weightlifting competition, limiting competitors to a maximum of 69 kilograms of body mass.

== Schedule ==
All times are Eastern European Summer Time (UTC+3).

Date	Time	Round
June 22, 2013	12:00	Final

== Results ==
5 athletes from five countries will take part.

=== Snatch ===
Rank	Name	Group	B.weight (kg)	Snatch (kg)
1st place, gold medalist(s)	Daniel Godelli (ALB)	A	68.95	151
2nd place, silver medalist(s)	Karem Ben Hnia (TUN)	A	68.20	138
3rd place, bronze medalist(s)	Ekrem Ağıllı (TUR)	A	68.95	136
—	Yann Aucouturier (FRA)	A	68.70	—
DQ	Briken Calja (ALB)	A	68.70	~~138~~

=== Clean & Jerk ===
Rank	Name	Group	B.weight (kg)	Clean & Jerk (kg)
1st place, gold medalist(s)	Daniel Godelli (ALB)	A	68.95	174
2nd place, silver medalist(s)	Karem Ben Hnia (TUN)	A	68.20	173
3rd place, bronze medalist(s)	Yann Aucouturier (FRA)	A	68.70	166
4	Ekrem Ağıllı (TUR)	A	68.95	155
DQ	Briken Calja (ALB)	A	68.70	~~170~~
