= Yosra Dhieb =

Tunisian weightlifter (born 1995)

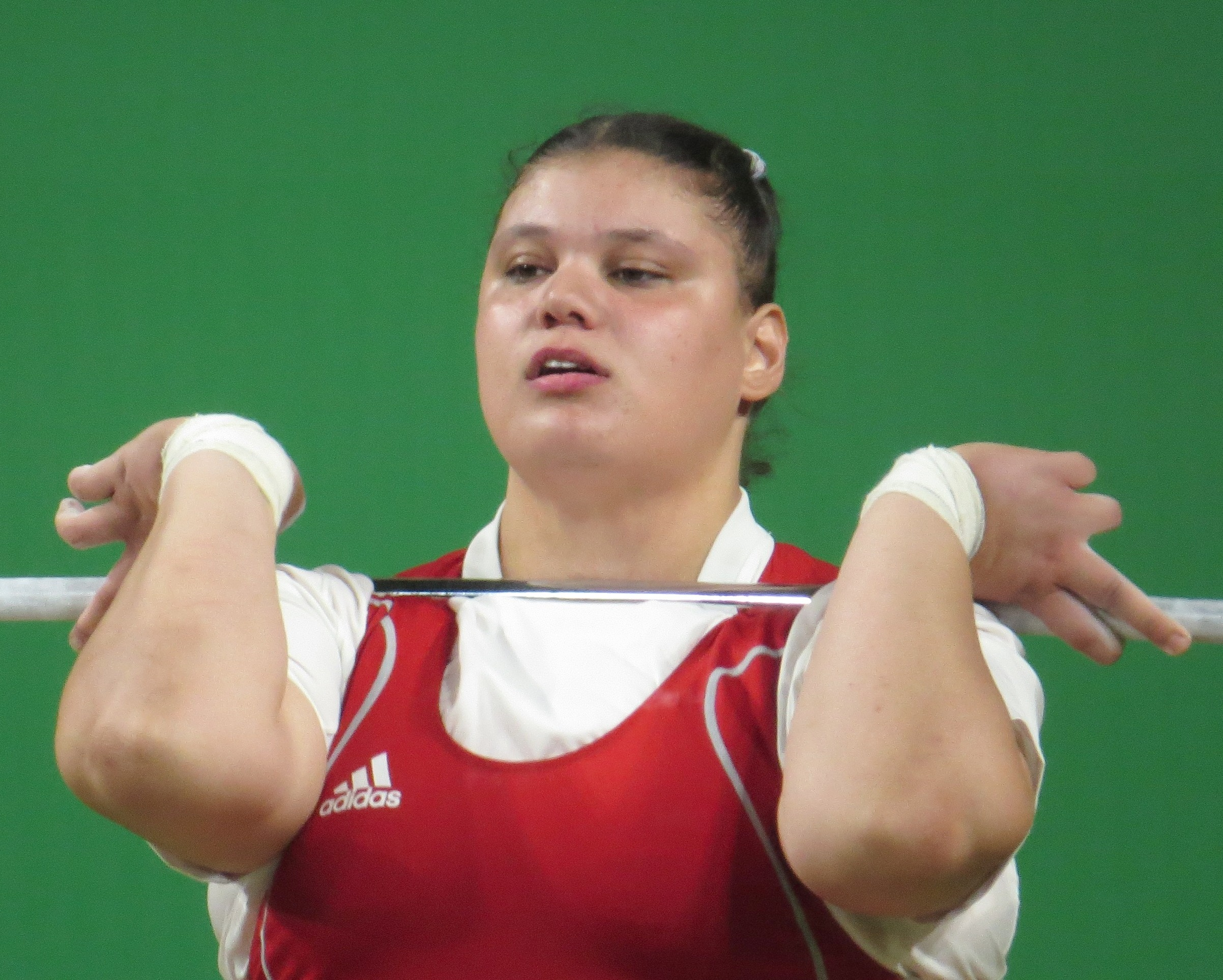
- Dhieb at the 2016 Olympics

Personal information
- Born: 31 August 1995 (age 30)
- Height: 1.78 m (5 ft 10 in)
- Weight: 120 kg (260 lb)

Sport
- Country: Tunisia
- Sport: Weightlifting
- Event: Women's +75 kg
- Club: Club Sportif Sfaxien
Medal record
Representing Tunisia
African Games
Bronze medal – third place	2015 Brazzaville	+75 kg
African Weightlifting Championships
Gold medal – first place	2013 Casablanca	+75 kg

Yosra Dhieb (born 31 August 1995) is a Tunisian weightlifter who competes in the +75 kg division. She won the African Championships in 2013 and placed third at the 2015 African Games and fourth at the 2016 Olympics.
