= Albania at the 2013 Mediterranean Games =

- IOC code: ALB
- NOC: Albanian National Olympic Committee

in Mersin
- Competitors: 50 in 13 sports
- Medals Ranked th: Gold 3 Silver 2 Bronze 5 Total 10

Mediterranean Games appearances (overview)
- 1987; 1991; 1993; 1997; 2001; 2005; 2009; 2013; 2018; 2022

Albania competed at the 2013 Mediterranean Games in Mersin, Turkey from the 20th to 30 June 2013.

== Medalists ==
Medal	Name	Sport	Event	Date
Gold	Daniel Godelli	Weightlifting	Men's -69 kg snatch	22 June
Gold	Daniel Godelli	Weightlifting	Men's -69 kg clean & jerk	22 June
Gold	Ervis Tabaku	Weightlifting	Men's -94 kg snatch	25 June
Silver	Romela Begaj	Weightlifting	Women's -63 kg snatch	23 June
Silver	Luiza Gega	Athletics	Women's 1500 m	26 June
Bronze	Briken Calja	Weightlifting	Men's -69 kg snatch	22 June
Bronze	Briken Calja	Weightlifting	Men's -69 kg clean & jerk	22 June
Bronze	Romela Begaj	Weightlifting	Women's -63 kg clean & jerk	23 June
Bronze	Ervis Tabaku	Weightlifting	Men's -94 kg clean & jerk	25 June
Bronze	Egzon Shala	Wrestling	Men's Freestyle -96 kg	26 June

== Athletics ==
Key

- Note – Ranks given for track events are within the athlete's heat only
- Q = Qualified for the next round
- q = Qualified for the next round as a fastest loser or, in field events, by position without achieving the qualifying target
- NR = National record
- N/A = Round not applicable for the event
- Bye = Athlete not required to compete in round

Men
Track & road events

Athlete	Event	Final	
Athlete	Event	Result	Rank
Ilir Kellezi	5000 m	did not start	
Ilir Kellezi	10000 m	33:29.09	6

Women
Track & road events

Athlete	Event	Final	
Athlete	Event	Result	Rank
Luiza Gega	800 m	2:01.96	4
Luiza Gega	1500 m	4:05.63	2nd place, silver medalist(s)

== Boxing ==
Men

Athlete	Event	Round of 16	Quarterfinals	Semifinals	Final	
Athlete	Event	Opposition Result	Opposition Result	Opposition Result	Opposition Result	Rank
Kristiani Shytani	Light welterweight	Chadi (ALG); L 0–3	did not advance			
Christian Demaj	Light heavyweight	BYE	Yildirim (TUR); L 0–3	did not advance		

== Cycling ==
Athlete	Event	Time	Rank
Emiliano Stojku	Men's road race	3:20:11	11
Emiliano Stojku	Men's time trial	39:32.68	21
Eugert Zhupa	Men's road race	3:20:18	27
Eugert Zhupa	Men's time trial	35:21.48	13

== Football ==
=== Men's tournament ===
Team

COACH: (Albania) Skënder Gega

The following players were called up and participated in the 2013 Mediterranean Games football tournament, which began on 19 June in Mersin, Turkey.

No.	Pos.	Player	Date of birth (age)	Caps	Goals	Club
1	GK	Aldo Teqja (Captain)	4 May 1995 (age 29)	5	0	(Cyprus) Anorthosis Famagusta
12	GK	Marsel Çaka	31 March 1995 (age 29)	1	0	(Albania) Tirana
	GK	Thomas Strakosha	19 March 1995 (age 30)	-	-	(Italy) Lazio
4	DF	Amir Rrahmani	24 February 1994 (age 31)	5	1	(Albania) Partizani Tirana
5	DF	Marvin Turtulli	17 October 1994 (age 30)	5	1	(Albania) Dinamo Tirana
3	DF	Erion Hoxhallari	15 October 1995 (age 29)	5	0	(Albania) Tirana
2	DF	Arben Muskaj	27 June 1994 (age 30)	5	0	(Greece) PAS Giannina
13	DF	Kristi Marku	13 April 1995 (age 29)	2	0	(Albania) Teuta Durrës
14	DF	Rexhep Memini	10 April 1994 (age 30)	2	0	(Albania) Teuta Durrës
15	DF	Melsen Shkreta	16 April 1994 (age 30)	2	0	(Albania) Dinamo Tirana
	DF	Amir Bilali	15 April 1994 (age 30)	-	-	(Italy) Lazio
16	MF	Klaudio Hyseni	15 July 1994 (age 30)	5	1	(Albania) Teuta Durrës
17	MF	Ilir Kastrati	20 July 1994 (age 30)	5	1	(Greece) Panathinaikos
7	MF	Enis Gavazaj	21 March 1995 (age 29)	5	0	(Belgium) Gent
10	MF	Maldin Ymeraj	6 March 1995 (age 30)	5	0	(Greece) Panathinaikos
6	MF	Ermir Rezi	12 May 1994 (age 30)	4	0	(Albania) Teuta Durrës
8	MF	Klodian Gino	13 February 1994 (age 31)	3	1	(Greece) Olympiacos
	MF	Liridon Latifi	6 February 1994 (age 31)	-	-	(Kosovo) Prishtina
18	FW	Valon Ahmedi	7 October 1994 (age 30)	5	0	(Italy) Südtirol
11	FW	Arlind Ferhati	20 January 1994 (age 31)	3	0	(Albania) Dinamo Tirana
9	FW	Mateus Shkreta	16 April 1994 (age 30)	2	0	(Czech Republic) Teplice

Current coaching staff:

Head coach	(Albania) Skënder Gega
Assistant coach	(Albania) Genti Mahmutaj
Athletic coach	(Albania) Fatos Kadena
Goalkeeping coach	(Albania) Gut Tafaj
Fitness coach	(Albania) Xhaferr Koçi
Physiotherapists	(Albania) Perli Rusi
Team doctor	(Albania) Alban Merepeza

Standings

Team	Pld	W	D	L	GF	GA	GD	Pts
Morocco	3	3	0	0	7	2	+5	9
Turkey	3	2	0	1	8	4	+4	6
Albania	3	0	1	2	3	6	−3	1
Bosnia and Herzegovina	3	0	1	2	4	10	−6	1

Results

June 19, 2013
21:45

Turkey	2 – 0	Albania
Aydin 10'; Sazdagi 86'	Report

Tevfik Sırrı Gür Stadium, Mersin
Referee: Andrea De Marco (Italy)

June 21, 2013
18:00

Albania	2 – 2	Bosnia and Herzegovina
Turtulli 61'; Rrahmani 73'	Report	Bajić 44', 52'

Tarsus Şehir Stadı, Tarsus
Referee: Baris Simsek (Turkey)

June 23, 2013
21:45

Morocco	2 – 1	Albania
Khaloua 33' (pen.); El Hassouni 58'	Report	Gino 47'

Tevfik Sırrı Gür Stadium, Mersin
Referee: Alain Bieri (Switzerland)

==== Classification 5–8 matches ====
June 25, 2013
21:00

Albania	1 – 2 (a.e.t.)	North Macedonia
Kastrati 85' (pen.)	Report	Kostovski 50'; Imeri 96'

Tevfik Sırrı Gür Stadium, Mersin
Referee: Nikola Popov (Bulgaria)

==== Seventh place match ====
June 26, 2013
18:00

Albania	1 – 3	Italy
Hyseni 82'	Report	Canotto 20'; Bollino 47'; Gomez 54' (pen.)

Tarsus Şehir Stadı, Tarsus
Referee: Khalid Ennouni (Morocco)

== Gymnastics ==
=== Artistic ===
Men

Athlete	Event	Qualification								Final							
Athlete	Event	Apparatus						Total	Rank	Apparatus						Total	Rank
Athlete	Event	F	PH	R	V	PB	HB	Total	Rank	F	PH	R	V	PB	HB	Total	Rank
Alon Hasa	All-around	13.066	11.100	12.600	13.066	12.433	12.500	74.765	25 Q	13.033	12.933	12.866	13.200	12.766	12.166	76.964	16

== Judo ==
Athlete	Event	Round of 16	Quarterfinals	Semifinals	Repechage	Final / BM	
Athlete	Event	Opposition Result	Opposition Result	Opposition Result	Opposition Result	Opposition Result	Rank
Indrit Cullhaj	Men's −60 kg	—	Moudatir (MAR); L 000-100	BYE	Damien (LIB); L 000–100	did not advance	
Lleshi Kristjan	Men's −66 kg	Murat (TUR); L 000-120	did not advance				
Arta Merturi	Women's −57 kg	—	Lo Giudice (ITA); L 000-100	BYE	Elliot (FRA); L 000–120	did not advance	

== Karate ==
Men

Athlete	Event	Round of 16	Quarterfinals	Semifinals	Repechage	Final / BM	
Athlete	Event	Opposition Result	Opposition Result	Opposition Result	Opposition Result	Opposition Result	Rank
Xhino Toli	−67 kg	Railič (SLO); L 0-2	did not advance				

== Shooting ==
Men

Athlete	Event	Qualification		Final	
Athlete	Event	Points	Rank	Points	Rank
Arben Cerina	10 m air pistol	556	17	did not advance	
Arben Kucana	10 m air pistol	563	13	did not advance	
Arben Cerina	50 m pistol	526	13	did not advance	
Arben Kucana	50 m pistol	540	11	did not advance	
Dritan Taka	Double trap	77	10	did not advance	

Women

Athlete	Event	Qualification		Final	
Athlete	Event	Points	Rank	Points	Rank
Lumturi Pepa	10 m air rifle	385.5	17	did not advance	
Aida Mustafaj	10 m air pistol	349	17	did not advance	

== Swimming ==
Men

Athlete	Event	Heat		Final	
Athlete	Event	Time	Rank	Time	Rank
Donado Dervishi	50 m freestyle	26.51	17	did not advance	
Donado Dervishi	100 m breaststroke	1:11.89	17	did not advance	

Women

Athlete	Event	Heat		Final	
Athlete	Event	Time	Rank	Time	Rank
Noel Borshi	400 m freestyle	4:36.14	12	did not advance	
Noel Borshi	100 m butterfly	1:06.14	10	did not advance	
Anxhela Kashari	50 m freestyle	28.03	13	did not advance	
Anxhela Kashari	50 m backstroke	34.11	13	did not advance	
Anxhela Kashari	50 m butterfly	29.52	11	did not advance	

== Taekwondo ==
Athlete	Event	Round of 16	Quarterfinals	Semifinals	Final / BM	
Athlete	Event	Opposition Result	Opposition Result	Opposition Result	Opposition Result	Rank
Egers Aliu	Men's -58 kg	Porcaro (ITA); L 5–17	did not advance			
Xhersi Kuti	Men's -68 kg	Ahmed (EGY); L 2–19 PTG	did not advance			

== Table tennis ==
Men

Athlete	Event	Round Robin 1			Round Robin 2				Quarterfinal	Semifinal	Final / BM	
Athlete	Event	Opposition Score	Opposition Score	Rank	Opposition Score	Opposition Score	Opposition Score	Rank	Opposition Score	Opposition Score	Opposition Score	Rank
Nikolla Haxhillazi	Singles	Mattenet (FRA); L 1–4	Makras (GRE); L 0–4	3	did not advance							

Women

Athlete	Event	Round Robin				Quarterfinal	Semifinal	Final / BM	
Athlete	Event	Opposition Score	Opposition Score	Opposition Score	Rank	Opposition Score	Opposition Score	Opposition Score	Rank
Arsena Osmenaj	Singles	Ramirez (ESP); L 0–4	Bsaibes (LIB); L 1–4	Papadaki (GRE); L 0–4	4	did not advance			

== Weightlifting ==
Men

Athlete	Event	Snatch		Clean & Jerk	
Athlete	Event	Result	Rank	Result	Rank
Arberi Cerciz	−62 kg	117	4	131	6
Briken Calja	−69 kg	138	3rd place, bronze medalist(s)	170	3rd place, bronze medalist(s)
Daniel Godelli	−69 kg	151	1st place, gold medalist(s)	174	1st place, gold medalist(s)
Ervis Tabaku	−94 kg	166	1st place, gold medalist(s)	196	3rd place, bronze medalist(s)

Women

Athlete	Event	Snatch		Clean & Jerk	
Athlete	Event	Result	Rank	Result	Rank
Romela Begaj	−63 kg	99	2nd place, silver medalist(s)	117	3rd place, bronze medalist(s)

== Wrestling ==
Men's Freestyle

Athlete	Event	Quarterfinal	Semifinal	Repechage	Final / BM	
Athlete	Event	Opposition Result	Opposition Result	Opposition Result	Opposition Result	Rank
Egzon Shala	−96 kg	Frhat (EGY); W 2–0 ^{PP}	Yildirim (EGY); L 0–2 ^{PP}	BYE	Tsikovani (GRE); W 1–0 ^{VT}	3rd place, bronze medalist(s)
Fatjon Baro	−120 kg	Abdelwahab (EGY); L 0–2 ^{PP}	did not advance			

Men's Greco-Roman

Athlete	Event	Round of 16	Quarterfinal	Semifinal	Repechage	Final / BM	
Athlete	Event	Opposition Result	Opposition Result	Opposition Result	Opposition Result	Opposition Result	Rank
Meraldo Ndoka	−74 kg	BYE	Mohamed (EGY); L 0–2 ^{PO}	did not advance			
Ergys Mirukaj	−84 kg	BYE	Cebi (TUR); L 0–2 ^{PO}	BYE		Achouri (TUN); L 1–2 ^{PP}	5
