= Bünyamin Sezer =

Turkish weightlifter (born 1988)

Personal information
- Nationality: Turkish
- Born: July 4, 1988 (age 38) Tokat, Turkey
- Height: 1.63 m (5 ft 4 in)
- Weight: 67 kg (148 lb; 10.6 st)

Sport
- Country: Turkey
- Sport: Weightlifting
- Event: –62 kg
Medal record
Men's weightlifting
Representing Turkey
European Championships
Gold medal – first place	2011 Kazan	–62 kg
Disqualified	2012 Antalya	–62 kg
Disqualified	2017 Split	–62 kg
Mediterranean Games
Disqualified	2013 Mersin	–62 kg S
Disqualified	2013 Mersin	–62 kg CJ

Bünyamin Sezer (born July 4, 1988) is a Turkish weightlifter competing in the –62 kg division.

He won the silver medal in Snatch category at the 2010 European Weightlifting Championships held in Minsk, Belarus.

Sezer recently won gold at the 2011 European Weightlifting Championships and 2012 European Weightlifting Championships.

== Achievements ==
Rank			Competition	Host	Result
S	C	T	Competition	Host	Result
Silver medal	5	4	2010 European Championships	(Belarus) Minsk	136+153=289
Gold medal	Bronze medal	Gold medal	2011 European Championships	(Russia) Kazan	140+158=298
Bronze medal	15	9	2011 World Championships	(France) Paris	141+153=294
Gold medal	Silver medal	Gold medal	2012 European Championships	(Turkey) Antalya	142+159=301
Gold medal	Silver medal		2013 Mediterranean Games	(Turkey) Mersin	135+151
