= 2013 in weightlifting =

This article lists the main weightlifting events and their results for 2013.

== World & Grand Prix weightlifting championships ==
- April 7 – ?: 2013 Youth World Weightlifting Championships in (Uzbekistan) Tashkent
  - China won both the gold and overall medal tallies.
- May 3 – ?: 2013 Junior World Weightlifting Championships in (Peru) Lima
  - China won the gold medal tally. Russia won the overall medal tally.
- October 16 – ?: 2013 World Weightlifting Championships in (Poland) Wrocław
  - Russia and China won 6 gold medals each. Russia won the overall medal tally.
- November 21 – ?: 2013 IWF Grand Prix #1 in (Russia) Moscow
  - Men's 94 kg winner: (Russia) Ramazan Rasulov
  - Men's 105 kg winner: (Russia) Maksim Sheiko
  - Men's +105 kg winner: (Egypt) Mohamed Ihsan
  - Women's 75 kg winner: (Spain) Lydia Valentín
  - Women's +75 kg winner: (Russia) Tatiana Kashirina
- December 6 – ?: 2013 IWF Grand Prix #2 in (Azerbaijan) Baku
  - Men's 62 kg winner: (Uzbekistan) Ruslan Makarov
  - Men's 69 kg winner: (Russia) Sergey Petrov
  - Women's 53 kg winner: (Ukraine) Iulia Paratova
  - Women's 58 kg winner: (China) WANG Shuai

== Continental & regional weightlifting championships ==
- April 8 – ?: 2013 European Weightlifting Championships in (Albania) Tirana
  - Russia won both the gold and overall medal tallies.
- May 26 – ?: 2013 Asian Youth Weightlifting Championships in (Qatar) Doha
  - India won both the gold and overall medal tallies.
- June 20 – ?: 2013 Asian Weightlifting Championships in (Kazakhstan) Astana
  - North Korea won both the gold and overall medal tallies.
- June 26 – ?: 2013 Pan American Weightlifting Championships in (Venezuela) Caracas
  - Colombia won both the gold and overall medal tallies.
- July 1 – ?: 2013 Asian Junior Weightlifting Championships in (Kyrgyzstan) Bishkek
  - China won both the gold and overall medal tallies.
- July 12 – ?: 2013 Oceania Senior, Junior, & Youth Weightlifting Championships in Brisbane
  - Senior: Papua New Guinea and Samoa won 4 gold medals each. Australia won the overall medal tally.
  - Junior: New Zealand, Papua New Guinea, and Samoa won 3 gold medals each. New Zealand won the overall medal tally.
  - Youth: Australia and Papua New Guinea won 3 gold medals each. Australia won the overall medal tally.
- July 29 – ?: 2013 South American & Pan American Junior Weightlifting Championships in (Chile) Santiago
  - South American: Ecuador won both the gold and overall medal tallies.
  - Pan American: United States and Venezuela won 4 gold medals each. Ecuador won the overall medal tally.
- September 1 – ?: 2013 European U17 Weightlifting Championships in (Lithuania) Klaipėda
  - Russia won both the gold and overall medal tallies.
- September 3 – ?: 2013 Pan American Youth Weightlifting Championships in Cancún
  - Mexico and Colombia won 7 gold medals each. Mexico won the overall medal tally.
- September 23 – ?: 2013 European Junior Weightlifting Championships in (Estonia) Tallinn
  - Russia won both the gold and overall medal tallies.
- October 28 – ?: 2013 African Senior, Junior, & Youth Weightlifting Championships in (Morocco) Casablanca
  - Senior: Tunisia won the gold medal tally. Tunisia and Algeria won 10 overall medals each.
  - Junior: Tunisia won the gold medal tally. Algeria won the overall medal tally.
  - Youth: Algeria won both the gold and overall medal tallies.
- November 16 – ?: 2013 South American Weightlifting Championships in (Peru) Chiclayo
  - Colombia won the gold medal tally. Colombia and Ecuador won 12 overall medals each.
- November 24 – ?: 2013 Commonwealth Senior, Junior, & Youth Weightlifting Championships in (Malaysia) Penang
  - Senior: Nigeria won the gold medal tally. India won the overall medal tally.
  - Junior: India won both the gold and overall medal tallies.
  - Youth: India won both the gold and overall medal tallies.
