= Weightlifting at the 2013 Mediterranean Games – Men's 62 kg =

The men's 62 kg competition of the weightlifting events at the 2013 Mediterranean Games in Mersin, Turkey, was held on June 21, at the Erdemli Sports Hall.

Each lifter performed in both the snatch and clean and jerk lifts, with the final score being the sum of the lifter's best result in each. The athlete received three attempts in each of the two lifts; the score for the lift was the heaviest weight successfully lifted. This weightlifting event was the lightest men's event at the weightlifting competition, limiting competitors to a maximum of 62 kilograms of body mass.

== Schedule ==
All times are Eastern European Summer Time (UTC+3).

Date	Time	Round
June 21, 2013	13:00	Final

== Results ==
7 athletes from seven countries will take part.

=== Snatch ===
Rank	Name	Group	B.weight (kg)	Snatch (kg)
1st place, gold medalist(s)	Ahmed Saad (EGY)	A	61.95	131
2nd place, silver medalist(s)	Kevin Caesemaeker (FRA)	A	61.50	119
3rd place, bronze medalist(s)	Arberi Cerciz (ALB)	A	60.75	117
4	Arthouros Akritidis (GRE)	A	61.35	116
5	Marouan Ouertani (TUN)	A	61.30	115
6	Abdella Moussa (LBA)	A	61.35	110
DQ	Bünyamin Sezer (TUR)	A	62.00	~~135~~

=== Clean & Jerk ===
Rank	Name	Group	B.weight (kg)	Clean & Jerk (kg)
1st place, gold medalist(s)	Ahmed Saad (EGY)	A	61.95	156
2nd place, silver medalist(s)	Kevin Caesemaeker (FRA)	A	61.50	147
3rd place, bronze medalist(s)	Arthouros Akritidis (GRE)	A	61.35	146
5	Marouan Ouertani (TUN)	A	61.30	143
6	Arberi Cerciz (ALB)	A	60.75	131
—	Abdella Moussa (LBA)	A	61.35	—
DQ	Bünyamin Sezer (TUR)	A	62.00	~~151~~
