= Weightlifting at the 2013 Mediterranean Games =

- Venue: Erdemli Sports Hall
- Location: Turkey, Mersin
- Dates: 21–26 June

The weightlifting competitions at the 2013 Mediterranean Games in Mersin took place between 21 and 26 June at the Erdemli Sports Hall.

Athletes competed in 28 events across 14 weight categories (7 for men and 7 for women). Men's +105 kg category will not be held because too few nations applied.

== Medal summary ==
=== Men's events ===
Event		Gold	Silver	Bronze
56 kg	Snatch	Khalil El Maoui (TUN)	Mirco Scarantino (ITA)	Michael Steven Otero (ESP)
56 kg	Clean & Jerk	Khalil El Maoui (TUN)	Mirco Scarantino (ITA)	Michael Di Giusto (ITA)
62 kg	Snatch	Ahmed Saad (EGY)	Kevin Caesemaeker (FRA)	Arberi Cerciz (ALB)
62 kg	Clean & Jerk	Ahmed Saad (EGY)	Kevin Caesemaeker (FRA)	Arthouros Akritidis (GRE)
69 kg	Snatch	Daniel Godelli (ALB)	Karem Ben Hnia (TUN)	Ekrem Ağıllı (TUR)
69 kg	Clean & Jerk	Daniel Godelli (ALB)	Karem Ben Hnia (TUN)	Ekrem Ağıllı (TUR)
77 kg	Snatch	Ramzi Bahloul (TUN)	Semih Yağcı (TUR)	Mohamed Sultan (EGY)
77 kg	Clean & Jerk	Ibrahim Abdelbaki (EGY)	Ramzi Bahloul (TUN)	Mohamed Sultan (EGY)
85 kg	Snatch	Tarek Abdelazim (EGY)	Giovanni Bardis (FRA)	Theodoros Iakovidis (GRE)
85 kg	Clean & Jerk	Tarek Abdelazim (EGY)	Nezir Sağır (TUR)	Theodoros Iakovidis (GRE)
94 kg	Snatch	Ervis Tabaku (ALB)	Ragab Abdelhay (EGY)	Ossama Khattab (EGY)
94 kg	Clean & Jerk	Ragab Abdelhay (EGY)	Ossama Khattab (EGY)	Ervis Tabaku (ALB)
105 kg	Snatch	David Kavelasvili (GRE)	Ahed Jugheli (SYR)	Walid Bidani (ALG)
105 kg	Clean & Jerk	David Kavelasvili (GRE)	Ahed Jugheli (SYR)	Gaber Mohamed (EGY)

=== Women's events ===
Event		Gold	Silver	Bronze
48 kg	Snatch	Genny Pagliaro (ITA)	Sibel Özkan Konak (TUR)	Basma Ibrahim (EGY)
48 kg	Clean & Jerk	Genny Pagliaro (ITA)	Estefania Juan Tello (ESP)	Basma Ibrahim (EGY)
53 kg	Snatch	Emine Şensoy (TUR)	Ayşegül Çoban (TUR)	Manon Lorentz (FRA)
53 kg	Clean & Jerk	Ayşegül Çoban (TUR)	Emine Şensoy (TUR)	Manon Lorentz (FRA)
58 kg	Snatch	Aylin Daşdelen (TUR)	Esraa Ahmed (EGY)	Nadia Hosni (TUN)
58 kg	Clean & Jerk	Aylin Daşdelen (TUR)	Esraa Ahmed (EGY)	Nadia Hosni (TUN)
63 kg	Snatch	Sibel Şimşek (TUR)	Romela Begaj (ALB)	Sara Ahmed (EGY)
63 kg	Clean & Jerk	Sara Ahmed (EGY)	Sibel Şimşek (TUR)	Romela Begaj (ALB)
69 kg	Snatch	Esmat Ahmed (EGY)	Ghada Hassine (TUN)	Sheila Ramos (ESP)
69 kg	Clean & Jerk	Esmat Ahmed (EGY)	Ghada Hassine (TUN)	Sheila Ramos (ESP)
75 kg	Snatch	Lydia Valentín Pérez (ESP)	Abeer Khail (EGY)	Carlotta Brunelli (ITA)
75 kg	Clean & Jerk	Lydia Valentín Pérez (ESP)	Abeer Khail (EGY)	Figen Kaya (TUR)
+75 kg	Snatch	Shaimaa Haridy (EGY)	Halima Abbas (EGY)	Marwa Jlassi (TUN)
+75 kg	Clean & Jerk	Shaimaa Haridy (EGY)	Halima Abbas (EGY)	Marwa Jlassi (TUN)

=== Medal table ===
Key:

* Host nation (Turkey)

Rank	Nation	Gold	Silver	Bronze	Total
1	Egypt	11	8	7	26
2	Turkey*	5	6	3	14
3	Tunisia	3	5	4	12
4	Albania	3	1	3	7
5	Italy	2	2	2	6
6	Spain	2	1	3	6
7	Greece	2	0	3	5
8	France	0	3	2	5
9	Syria	0	2	0	2
10	Algeria	0	0	1	1
Totals (10 entries)		28	28	28	84
