= Benedict Uloko =

Nigerian weightlifter (born 1984)

Medal record

Men's Weightlifting

Representing Nigeria

African Championships
| Gold medal – first place | 2008 Strand | 85 kg |

Benedict Uloko (born 19 March 1984) is a Nigerian weightlifter competing in the 85 kg category.

== Biography ==
He competed at the 2007 All-Africa Games, but did not finish.

At the 2008 African Championships he won overall gold with a total of 341 kg.

He competed in Weightlifting at the 2008 Summer Olympics in the 85 kg category finishing 13th with 339 kg.

At the 2010 Commonwealth Games, he won the bronze medal for Nigeria, just being beaten by Scotland's Peter Kirkbride.
