= Weightlifting at the 2013 Mediterranean Games – Men's 94 kg =

The men's 94 kg competition of the weightlifting events at the 2013 Mediterranean Games in Mersin, Turkey, was held on June 25 at the Erdemli Sports Hall.

Each lifter performed in both the snatch and clean and jerk lifts, with the final score being the sum of the lifter's best result in each. The athlete received three attempts in each of the two lifts; the score for the lift was the heaviest weight successfully lifted. This weightlifting event was the lightest men's event at the weightlifting competition, limiting competitors to a maximum of 94 kilograms of body mass.

== Schedule ==
All times are Eastern European Summer Time (UTC+3).

Date	Time	Round
June 25, 2013	12:00	Final

== Results ==
8 athletes from five countries will take part.

=== Snatch ===
Rank	Name	Group	B.weight (kg)	Snatch (kg)
1st place, gold medalist(s)	Ervis Tabaku (ALB)	A	93.85	166
2nd place, silver medalist(s)	Ragab Abdelhay (EGY)	A	93.35	163
3rd place, bronze medalist(s)	Ossama Khattab (EGY)	A	91.45	161
4	Mohamed Amine Doghmane (TUN)	A	93.20	160
5	Christos Saltsidis (GRE)	A	93.50	158
6	Georgios Markoulas (GRE)	A	93.20	142
7	Igor Tomic (SRB)	A	92.80	135
—	Abdurrahman Shtewi (LBA)	A	93.40	—

=== Clean & Jerk ===
Rank	Name	Group	B.weight (kg)	Clean & Jerk (kg)
1st place, gold medalist(s)	Ragab Abdelhay (EGY)	A	93.35	206
2nd place, silver medalist(s)	Ossama Khattab (EGY)	A	91.45	200
3rd place, bronze medalist(s)	Ervis Tabaku (ALB)	A	93.85	196
4	Mohamed Amine Doghmane (TUN)	A	93.20	191
5	Georgios Markoulas (GRE)	A	93.20	190
6	Igor Tomic (SRB)	A	92.80	180
7	Christos Saltsidis (GRE)	A	93.50	180
—	Abdurrahman Shtewi (LBA)	A	93.40	—
