= Tanimowo =

Tanímọ̀wò
- Gender: Unisex
- Language: Yoruba

Origin
- Origin: Nigeria
- Meaning: who is able to take care of him/her?
- Region of origin: South West, Nigeria

Tanimowo audio is a Nigerian given name and a surname. It is a unisex name and of Yoruba origin, which means "who is able to take care of him/her?". Tanimowo is a powerful name with depth and profound meaning. The diminutive form can be Tanmowo or Tanmo, same meaning but in shorter form with Yoruba phonetic reduction.

== Notable individuals with the name ==
- Tanimowo Ogunlesi (1908–2002), Nigerian activist
- Rasaq Tanimowo (born 1992), Nigerian weightlifter
