= Albania at the 2001 Mediterranean Games =

- IOC code: ALB
- NOC: Albanian National Olympic Committee

in Tunis
- Competitors: 42
- Medals Ranked 16th: Gold 0 Silver 1 Bronze 0 Total 1

Mediterranean Games appearances (overview)
- 1987; 1991; 1993; 1997; 2001; 2005; 2009; 2013; 2018; 2022

Albania competed at the 2001 Mediterranean Games held in Tunis, Tunisia.

== Medals by sport ==
Sport	Gold	Silver	Bronze	Total
Weightlifting	0	1	0	1
Totals (1 entries)	0	1	0	1

== List of Medalists ==
Medal	Name	Sport	Event
Silver	Ilir Kafarni	Weightlifting	85 kg clean & jerk
