= Felix Ekpo =

Nigerian weightlifter (born 1981)

Medal record

Men's Weightlifting

Representing Nigeria

All-Africa Games
| Gold medal – first place | 2007 Algiers | 77 kg |

African Championships
| Silver medal – second place | 2008 Strand | 77 kg |

Felix Ekpo (born 10 May 1981) is a Nigerian weightlifter competing in the 77 kg category. His personal best is 335 kg.

He won overall gold at the 2007 All-Africa Games, with a total of 333 kg.

At the 2007 World Weightlifting Championships he ranked 23rd with a total of 327 kg.

He won gold in the snatch, silver in the clean and jerk, and overall silver at the 2008 African Championships, with a total of 335 kg.

He competed in Weightlifting at the 2008 Summer Olympics in the 77 kg division finishing fifteenth with 325 kg. In 2012 he competed in the same weight division and finished 8th with a total of 331 kg.

He is 5 ft 3 inches tall and weighs 170 lb.
