= Ragab Abdelhay =

Egyptian weightlifter (born 1991)

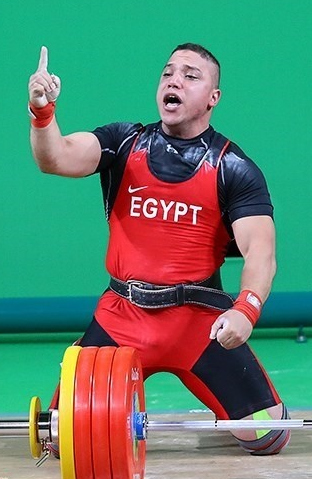
- Abdelhay at the 2016 Olympics

Personal information
- Full name: Ragab Abdelhay Saad Abdelrazek Abdalla
- Nationality: Egyptian
- Born: 4 March 1991 (age 35) Damietta, Egypt
- Height: 175 cm (5 ft 9 in)
- Weight: 93 kg (205 lb)

Sport
- Country: Egypt
- Sport: Weightlifting
- Event: –94kg
Medal record
Men's weightlifting
Representing Egypt
African Games
Gold medal – first place	2015 Brazzaville	94 kg
Gold medal – first place	2019 Rabat	102 kg
African Championships
Gold medal – first place	2017 Vacoas	94 kg
Gold medal – first place	Kampala 2009	77 kg

Ragab Abdelhay Saad Abdelrazek Abdalla (Arabic: رجب عبد الحي سعد عبد الرازق عبد الله, born 4 March 1991), known as Ragab Abdalla or Ragab Abdelhay, is an Egyptian weightlifter. He finished fifth at the 2012 Olympics (−85 kg) and fifth at the 2016 Olympics (−94 kg). He won the gold medal at the 2013 Mediterranean Games in the 94 kg event.

== Major competitions ==
Year	Venue	Weight	Snatch (kg)				Clean & Jerk (kg)				Total	Rank
Year	Venue	Weight	1	2	3	Rank	1	2	3	Rank	Total	Rank
Representing Egypt
Olympic Games
2016	Rio de Janeiro, Brazil	94 kg	165	170	174	5	205	~~211~~	213	5	387	5
2012	London, United Kingdom	85 kg	161	165	~~167~~	7	202	207	~~210~~	4	372	5
Mediterranean Games
2013	Mersin, Turkey	94 kg	~~163~~	163	~~167~~	—N/a	206	~~216~~	~~216~~	—N/a	369	1st place, gold medalist(s)
