= Mahmoud El-Haddad =

Egyptian weightlifter (born 1986)

Medal record

Men's Weightlifting

Representing Egypt

African Weightlifting Championships
Gold medal – first place	2008 Johannesburg	77 kg

Mahmoud Fisal Elhaddad (born March 10, 1986) is an Egyptian weightlifter. He competes in the 77 kg category.

== Career ==
Elhaddad won silver in the snatch, gold in the clean and jerk, and overall gold at the 2008 African Championships, with a total of 336 kg.

He competed in weightlifting at the 2008 Summer Olympics in the 77 kg division finishing twelfth with 342 kg. This beat his previous personal best by 6 kg.
