= Semih Yağcı =

Turkish weightlifter (born 1988)

Personal information
- Nationality: Turkish
- Born: November 11, 1988 (age 37) Sakarya, Turkey
- Height: 1.71 m (5 ft 7 in)
- Weight: 77 kg (170 lb; 12.1 st)

Sport
- Country: Turkey
- Sport: Weightlifting
- Event: – 77 kg
Medal record
European Championships
Gold medal – first place	2011 Kazan	– 77 kg
Mediterranean Games
Silver medal – second place	2013 Mersin	–77 kg Snatch
Bronze medal – third place	2009 Pescara	–77 kg Snatch
European U-23 Championships
Bronze medal – third place	2010 Limassol	– 77 kg

Semih Yağcı (born November 11, 1988) is a Turkish weightlifter competing in the –77 kg division.

He won the gold medal at the 2011 European Weightlifting Championships held in Kazan, Russia lifting for bronze medal in the Snatch category and then for the gold medal in the Clean&Jerk discipline.

== Medals ==
European Championships

Rank	Discipline	Snatch	Clean&Jerk	Total	Place	Date
Bronze	77 kg	155.0			Kazan, RUS	Apr 11–17, 2011
Gold	77 kg		192.0		Kazan, RUS	Apr 11–17, 2011
Gold	77 kg			347.0	Kazan, RUS	Apr 11–17, 2011

Mediterranean Games

Rank	Discipline	Snatch	Clean&Jerk	Place	Date
Bronze	77 kg	154.0		Pescara, ITA	June 25-July 5, 2009
Silver	77 kg	151.0		Mersin, TUR	June 2013

European Under 23 Championships

Rank	Discipline	Snatch	Clean&Jerk	Total	Place	Date
Bronze	77 kg	144.0			Limassol, CYP	Nov 22–28, 2010
Bronze	77 kg			325.0	Limassol, CYP	Nov 22–28, 2010
Gold	77 kg	154.0			Władysławowo, POL	Oct 11–18, 2009
