= Albania at the 2009 Mediterranean Games =

- IOC code: ALB
- NOC: Albanian National Olympic Committee

in Pescara
- Medals Ranked 13th: Gold 2 Silver 4 Bronze 0 Total 6

Mediterranean Games appearances (overview)
- 1987; 1991; 1993; 1997; 2001; 2005; 2009; 2013; 2018; 2022

Albania competed at the 2009 Mediterranean Games in Pescara, Italy.

== Boxing ==
=== Men ===
Athlete	Event	1/8 Final	Quarterfinals	Semifinals	Final
Athlete	Event	Opposition Result	Opposition Result	Opposition Result	Opposition Result
Enea Kovaci	Middle 75 kg	Bye	Hamani (ALG); L	Did not advance	
Albi Sorra	Super Light 64 kg	Moussaid (MAR); L 4–10	Did not advance		
Jetmir Kuci	Welter 69 kg	Vastine (FRA); W 8–2	Sipal (TUR); L	Did not advance	
Dachua Sulejmani	Light Heavy 81 kg	Elmekachari (TUN); L 1–7	Did not advance		
Nelson Hysa	Super Heavy +91 kg	Bye	Tomasović (CRO); L	Did not advance	

== Rowing ==
Men

Athletes	Events	Heat		Repechage		Final	
Athletes	Events	Time	Rank	Time	Rank	Time	Rank
Andi Cuko; Edi Theka	Double Sculls	8:18.42	4	7:26.58	5 Q→FB	7:21.76	7

== Weightlifting ==
Men

Athlete	Event	Snatch		Clean & jerk	
Athlete	Event	Result	Rank	Result	Rank
Briken Calja	69 kg	142	Silver medal	163	4
Erkand Qerimaj	77 kg	156	Gold medal	193	Silver medal
Endri Haxhihyseni	85 kg	161	4	—	10
Ervis Tabaku	85 kg	166	Silver medal	—	9

Women

Athlete	Event	Snatch		Clean & jerk	
Athlete	Event	Result	Rank	Result	Rank
Romela Begaj	58 kg	95	Gold medal	110	Silver medal
Fetie Kasaj	58 kg	—	9	—	9

== Wrestling ==
=== Men ===
Greco-Roman

Athlete	Event	1/8 Final	Quarterfinal	Semifinal	Final	Repechage Round 1	Bronze medal Bout
Athlete	Event	Opposition Result	Opposition Result	Opposition Result	Opposition Result	Opposition Result	Opposition Result
Blerim Pashtanjaku	66 kg	Maksimovic (SRB); L 13–0,2–0	Did not advance			Alnakdali (SYR); L 0–0, 0–0,	Did not advance

Freestyle

Athlete	Event	1/8 Final	Quarterfinal	Semifinal	Final	Repechage Round 1	Bronze medal Bout
Athlete	Event	Opposition Result	Opposition Result	Opposition Result	Opposition Result	Opposition Result	Opposition Result
Klodian Terziu	60 kg						
Roland Tusha	84 kg						

== Number of Entries by Sport ==
Discipline	Men	Women	Total
Athletics	2	0	2
Basketball	12	12	24
Beach volleyball	2	2	4
Boxing	5	0	5
Cycling Road	8	0	8
Football	18	0	18
Artistic Gymnastics	2	2	4
Handball	15	3	15
Judo	5	2	7
Karate	5	4	9
Rowing	2	0	2
Shooting	5	4	9
Swimming	5	0	5
Table Tennis	3	3	6
Volleyball	12	12	24
Weightlifting	4	2	6
Wrestling	3	0	3
Totals	108	43	151

== See also ==
- Mediterranean Games
- 2009 Mediterranean Games medal table
- European Olympic Committees
