= Albania at the Mediterranean Games =

- IOC code: ALB
- NOC: Albanian National Olympic Committee
- Medals Ranked 18th: Gold 13 Silver 20 Bronze 22 Total 55

Mediterranean Games appearances (overview)
- 1987; 1991; 1993; 1997; 2001; 2005; 2009; 2013; 2018; 2022; 2026

Albania has competed at every celebration of the Mediterranean Games since the 1987 Mediterranean Games. As of 2026, Albanian athletes have won a total of 55 medals. The country's ranking in the history of the Games is the 18th place.

== History ==
Albania participate for the first time in their history at the Mediterranean Games in 1987 Syria. It would be their most successful participanton, as Albania secured eight medals in which they won three gold medals in total. Two by the females in Basketball and Volleyball, and by men Shooter Kirsti Robo. Albania would also secure three medals in Athletics in which Ajet Toska won silver in hammer throw and bronze by Pavlina Evro in the 800 meters run. Albania would finish their first ever Mediterranean Games in 11th place. Their best result so far at this competition.

== Medal tables ==
=== Medals by Mediterranean Games ===
Games	Athletes	Gold	Silver	Bronze	Total	Rank
1987 Latakia		3	1	4	8	11
1991 Athens		0	4	4	8	15
1993 Languedoc-Roussillon		0	2	0	2	14
1997 Bari		0	1	1	2	15
2001 Tunis	42	0	1	0	1	16
2005 Almería	58	0	2	4	6	17
2009 Pescara	151	2	4	0	6	13
2013 Mersin	50	3	2	5	10	13
2018 Tarragona	59	1	1	0	2	20
2022 Oran	50	2	1	1	4	18
2026 Taranto	72	2	1	3	6	16
Total		13	20	22	55	18

=== Medals by sport ===
Sport	Gold	Silver	Bronze	Total
Weightlifting	6	11	12	29
Wrestling	2	2	4	8
Athletics	2	2	3	7
Shooting	1	4	2	7
Volleyball	1	0	0	1
Basketball	1	0	0	1
Boxing	0	1	1	2
Total	13	20	23	55

==== Medals at the Mediterranean Beach Games ====
Albania won so far two medals at the Mediterranean Beach Games in which being one Gold and one bronze, since their debut. Both in the Sport of Beach Wrestling.

Sport	Gold	Silver	Bronze	Total
Beach Wrestling	1	0	1	2
Total	1	0	1	2

== Athletes with most medals ==
The Albanian athletes with the most medals won in the history of the Mediterranean Games is female athlete Luiza Gega, who won three medals in total for Albania. Most recently she won the gold medal for the second time running in her career, at the 2022 Mediterranean Games in Oran. The second most successful Albanian medalist at the Mediterranean games is female Weightlifter Romela Begaj she won in total four medals. Gold in 2009 and two medals in 2013 one bronze and silber medals in the Women's -63 kg category. The other one's in this list being male weightlifter Daniel Godelli and Erkand Qerimaj. Each with two medal wins.

Athlete	Sport	Games	Gold medal	Silver medal	Bronze medal	Total
Luiza Gega	Athletics	2022, 2018, 2013	2	1	0	**3**
Daniel Godelli	Weightlifting	2013,	2	0	0	**2**
**Romela Begaj**	Weightlifting	2013 2009, 2005	1	1	2	**4**
**Briken Calja**	Weightlifting	2026 2013, 2009	1	1	1	**3**
**Erkand Qerimaj**	Weightlifting	2022, 2009	1	1	0	**2**

Notes: athletes in bold are still active.

== See also ==
- Albania at the Olympics
- Albania at the Paralympics
- Sport in Albania
