= Housseyn Fardjallah =

Algerian weightlifter

Personal information
- Full name: Housseyn Fardjallah
- Born: 16 January 1993
- Died: 20 November 2016 (aged 23)
- Weight: 76.15 kg (167.9 lb)

Sport
- Country: Algeria
- Sport: Weightlifting
- Weight class: 77 kg
- Team: National team
- Updated on 18 October 2016

Housseyn Fardjallah (16 January 1993 – 20 November 2016) was an Algerian male weightlifter, who competed in the 77 kg category and represented Algeria at international competitions.

As a junior, he competed at the 2010 Summer Youth Olympics in the boys' 69 kg event. He participated at the 2013 Mediterranean Games in the 77 kg event. He won the bronze medal at the 2015 African Games. He won the silver medal at the 2016 African Weightlifting Championships after finishing first in the snatch (150 kg) and second in the clean & jerk (185 kg).

Fardjallah died aged 23 on 20 November 2016 in a traffic collision involving two vehicles and a truck.

== Major competitions ==
Year	Venue	Weight	Snatch (kg)				Clean & Jerk (kg)				Total	Rank
Year	Venue	Weight	1	2	3	Rank	1	2	3	Rank	Total	Rank
Mediterranean Games
2013	Mersin, Turkey	77 kg	140	143	147	—N/a	170	176	~~180~~	—N/a	323	4
African Games
2015	(Republic of the Congo) Brazzaville, Congo	85 kg	140	~~145~~	~~145~~	4	170	174	~~175~~	4	314	3rd place, bronze medalist(s)
