= Yinka Ayenuwa =

Nigerian weightlifter

Personal information
- Nationality: Nigerian
- Born: 2 May 1986 (age 40) Warri
- Weight: 68 kg (150 lb)

Sport
- Sport: Weightlifting
- Event: 69 kg
Medal record
Men's weightlifting
Representing Nigeria
Commonwealth Games
Silver medal – second place	2014 Glasgow	69 kg
African Games
Silver medal – second place	2007 Algires	62 kg
Silver medal – second place	2015 Brazzaville	69 kg
- Updated on 9 February 2016

Yinka Ayenuwa (born 2 May 1986 in Warri) is a Nigerian weightlifter. He competed in the men's 69 kg event at the 2014 Commonwealth Games where he won a silver medal. In 2015, he won 3 silver medals at the African Games.

== Major results ==
Year	Venue	Weight	Snatch (kg)				Clean & Jerk (kg)				Total	Rank
Year	Venue	Weight	1	2	3	Rank	1	2	3	Rank	Total	Rank
Representing Nigeria
World Championships
2007	Chiang Mai, Thailand	62 kg	107	112	115	37	151	155	~~160~~	17	270	26
African Championships
2008	Strand, South Africa	69 kg	125	128	~~130~~	5	160	165	170	2	298	4
African Games
2015	Brazzaville, Republic of the Congo	69 kg	125	~~130~~	130	2nd place, silver medalist(s)	160	170	~~174~~	2nd place, silver medalist(s)	300	(silver)
2007	Algiers, Algeria	62 kg	113	~~118~~	~~118~~	4	150	155	160	1st place, gold medalist(s)	273	(silver)
Commonwealth Games
2014	(United Kingdom) Glasgow, Great Britain	69 kg	125	~~130~~	130	4	161	166	171	1	301	(silver)
