= Leila Lassouani =

Algerian weightlifter (born 1977)

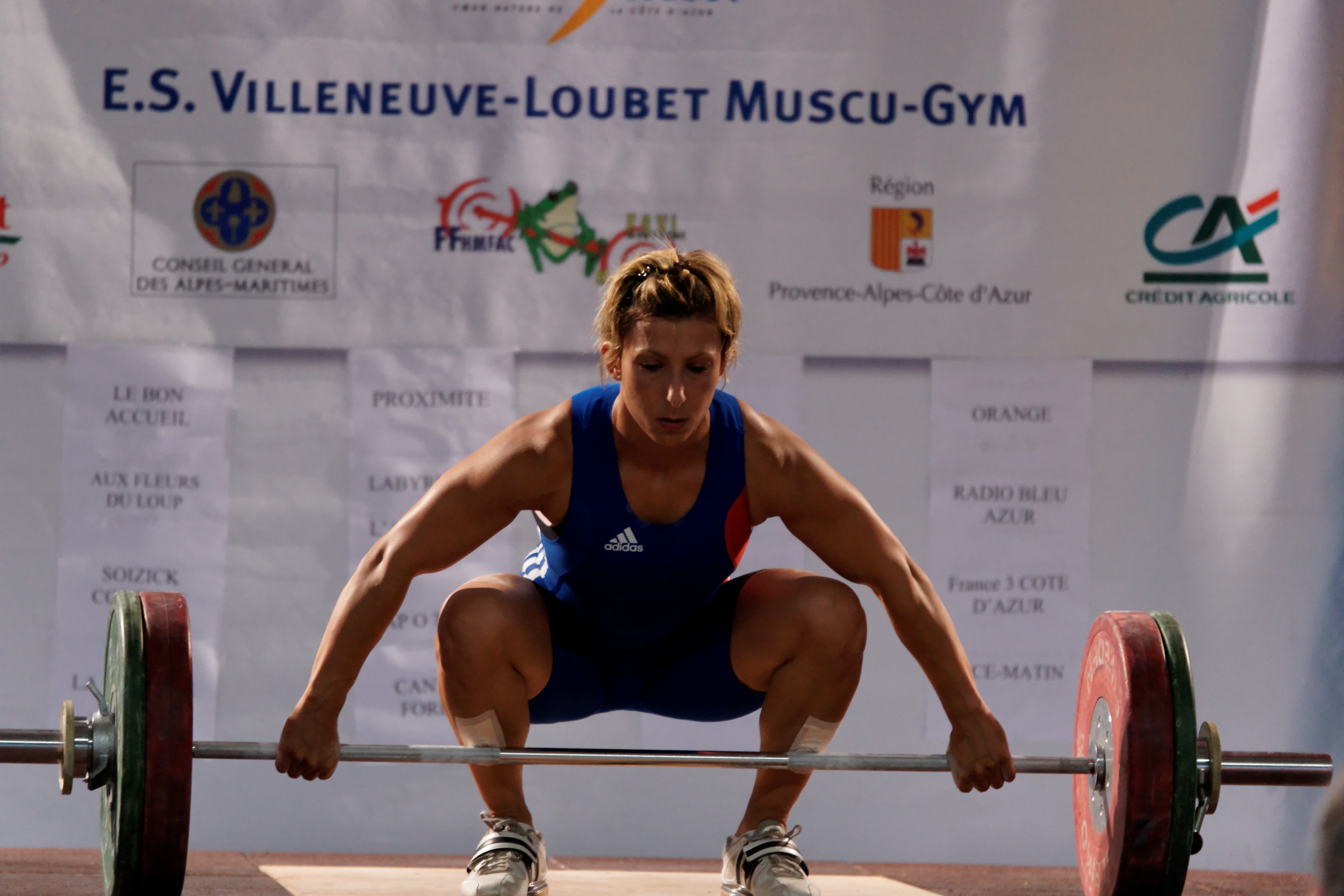

Medal record

Women's Weightlifting

Representing Algeria

African Weightlifting Championships
Gold medal – first place	2006 El Jadida	63 kg
Gold medal – first place	2008 Johannesburg	63 kg

Leila Françoise Lassouani (born July 29, 1977, in France) is a female weightlifter from Algeria. In 2006, she was named the best Algerian Sportsperson along with swimmer Salim Iles by the Algerian Press.

At the 2008 African Weightlifting Championships she won the gold medal in the 63 kg category, with a total of 205 kg.

She was the only Algerian weightlifter qualified to compete at the 2008 Beijing Olympic Games. In the Olympic tournament she did not finish due to failed attempts in the clean and jerk.

== Results ==
- Sydney 2000 Olympic Games

Women's 58 kg: finished 14th

- Athens 2004 Olympic Games

Women's 63 kg: finished 7th
