= Yvan Pierrot =

Mauritian weightlifter

Personal information
- Nationality: Mauritian
- Born: 23 May 1996 Trou d'eau Douce
- Died: 31 December 2015 (aged 19) Midlands
- Weight: 105 kg (231 lb)

Sport
- Sport: Weightlifting
- Event: +105 kg
Medal record
Representing Mauritius
Men's weightlifting
African Games
Bronze medal – third place	2015 Brazzaville	+105 kg
- Updated on 12 February 2016

Yvan Hilary Pierrot (23 May 1996 – 31 December 2015) was a Mauritian weightlifter. He competed in the men's +105 kg event at the 2015 African Games

== Sporting career ==
Pierrot started lifting in 2010 at the age of 14. He earned his first gold medal in 2013 at the Commonwealth Youth Championships. In 2013 he won Mauritian Junior Sportsman of the Year award. In 2015 he won silver medal at the Commonwealth Championships, also he won gold medal at the junior category. At the African Games he won two bronze medal (clean & jerk, total) at +105 kg category.

== Major results ==
Year	Venue	Weight	Snatch (kg)				Clean & Jerk (kg)				Total	Rank
Year	Venue	Weight	1	2	3	Rank	1	2	3	Rank	Total	Rank
Representing Mauritius
African Games
2015	Brazzaville, Republic of the Congo	+105 kg	135	141	146	4	180	185	—	3rd place, bronze medalist(s)	331	(bronze)

== Death ==
On New Year's Eve afternoon, 2015, he was driving home alone, and suffered a fatal car accident at the Midlands.
