= Basma Ibrahim =

Egyptian weightlifter (born 1995)

Personal information
- Born: 27 June 1995 (age 31)

Sport
- Country: Egypt
- Sport: Weightlifting
Medal record
Women's weightlifting
Representing Egypt
African Games
| Silver medal – second place | 2015 Brazzaville | 53 kg |
| Silver medal – second place | 2019 Rabat | 59 kg |
African Championships
| Bronze medal – third place | 2019 Cairo | 55 kg |
| Bronze medal – third place | 2022 Cairo | 59 kg |
Mediterranean Games
| Bronze medal – third place | 2013 Mersin | 48 kg S |
| Bronze medal – third place | 2013 Mersin | 48 kg CJ |
| Bronze medal – third place | 2022 Oran | 59 kg CJ |

Basma Emad Gouda Mohamed Ibrahim (born 27 June 1995) is an Egyptian weightlifter. She is a two-time silver medalist at the African Games.

== Career ==
She won the bronze medals in the women's 48 kg Snatch and Clean & Jerk events at the 2013 Mediterranean Games held in Mersin, Turkey. In 2014, she competed in the women's 53 kg event at the World Weightlifting Championships held in Almaty, Kazakhstan. She also competed in the women's 53 kg event at the 2015 World Weightlifting Championships held in Houston, United States.

She won the silver medal in the women's 59 kg event at the 2019 African Games held in Rabat, Morocco. She won the bronze medal in the women's 59 kg Clean & Jerk event at the 2022 Mediterranean Games held in Oran, Algeria.

== Achievements ==
| Year | Venue | Weight | Snatch (kg) | | | | Clean & Jerk (kg) | | | | Total | Rank |
| Year | Venue | Weight | 1 | 2 | 3 | Rank | 1 | 2 | 3 | Rank | Total | Rank |
World Championships
| 2014 | Almaty, Kazakhstan | 53 kg | ~~77~~ | 77 | 81 | 13 | 99 | 103 | 105 | 11 | 186 | 12 |
| 2015 | Houston, United States | 53 kg | 73 | 76 | ~~78~~ | 26 | 92 | 95 | ~~100~~ | 27 | 171 | 27 |
African Games
| 2015 | Brazzaville, Republic of the Congo | 53 kg | 78 | ~~82~~ | ~~83~~ | 2nd place, silver medalist(s) | 95 | 104 | ~~107~~ | 1st place, gold medalist(s) | 182 | 2nd place, silver medalist(s) |
| 2019 | Rabat, Morocco | 59 kg | 84 | ~~88~~ | 88 | 2nd place, silver medalist(s) | 110 | 114 | ~~116~~ | 2nd place, silver medalist(s) | 202 | 2nd place, silver medalist(s) |
African Championships
| 2019 | Cairo, Egypt | 55 kg | 78 | 82 | 85 | 3rd place, bronze medalist(s) | 100 | ~~108~~ | ~~108~~ | 3rd place, bronze medalist(s) | 185 | 3rd place, bronze medalist(s) |
Mediterranean Games
| 2013 | Mersin, Turkey | 48 kg | 72 | 74 | ~~76~~ | 3rd place, bronze medalist(s) | ~~90~~ | 92 | ~~95~~ | 3rd place, bronze medalist(s) | —N/a | —N/a |
| 2022 | Oran, Algeria | 59 kg | 85 | 88 | ~~91~~ | 5 | 110 | 113 | ~~116~~ | 3rd place, bronze medalist(s) | —N/a | —N/a |
