= Albania at the 2022 Mediterranean Games =

- IOC code: ALB
- NOC: Albanian National Olympic Committee

in Oran, Algeria 25 June 2022 – 6 July 2022
- Medals Ranked 18th: Gold 2 Silver 1 Bronze 1 Total 4

Mediterranean Games appearances (overview)
- 1987; 1991; 1993; 1997; 2001; 2005; 2009; 2013; 2018; 2022

Albania competed at the 2022 Mediterranean Games held in Oran, Algeria from 25 June to 6 July 2022.

== Medalists ==
Medal	Name	Sport	Event	Date
Gold	Zelimkhan Abakarov	Wrestling	Men's freestyle 65 kg	28 June
Gold	Luiza Gega	Athletics	Women's 3000 metres steeplechase	1 July
Silver	Erkand Qerimaj	Weightlifting	Men's 73 kg Snatch	2 July
Bronze	Islam Dudaev	Wrestling	Men's freestyle 74 kg	28 June

=== Medals per Sport ===
Medals by sport
Sport	1st place, gold medalist(s)	2nd place, silver medalist(s)	3rd place, bronze medalist(s)	Total	Rank
Wrestling	1	0	1	2	7
Athletics	1	0	0	1	14
Weightlifting	0	1	0	1	8

== Artistic gymnastics ==
Matvei Petrov competed in artistic gymnastics.

== Athletics ==
Albania won one gold medal in athletics.

Key

- Note–Ranks given for track events are within the athlete's heat only
- Q = Qualified for the next round
- q = Qualified for the next round as a fastest loser or, in field events, by position without achieving the qualifying target
- NR = National record
- N/A = Round not applicable for the event
- Bye = Athlete not required to compete in round

Track & road events
Men

Athlete	Event	Semifinal		Final	
Athlete	Event	Result	Rank	Result	Rank
Franko Burraj	400 m	46.26	2 Q	46.16 NR	4

Women

Athlete	Event	Final	
Athlete	Event	Result	Rank
Luiza Gega	3000 m steeplechase	9:14.29 GR NR	1st place, gold medalist(s)

== Boxing ==
Albania competed in boxing.

Men

Athlete	Event	Round of 16	Quarterfinals	Semifinals	Final / BM	
Athlete	Event	Opposition Score	Opposition Score	Opposition Score	Opposition Score	Rank
Ardit Murja	featherweight	Abdellatif Zouhairi (MAR); L 3-0	Did not advance			
Alban Beqiri	welterweight	Necat Ekinci (TUR); W 2-1	Jugurtha Ait-Bekka (ALG); L ABD	Did not advance		
Arjon Kajoshi	middleweight	Moreno Fendero (FRA); L 3-0	Did not advance			
Nelson Hysa	super heavyweight	—	Vincenzo Fiaschetti (ITA); L 2-1	Did not advance		

== Judo ==
Albania competed in judo.

Men

Athlete	Event	Round of 16	Quarterfinals	Semifinals	Repechage 1	Repechage 2	Final / BM	
Athlete	Event	Opposition Result	Opposition Result	Opposition Result	Opposition Result	Opposition Result	Opposition Result	Rank
Indrit Çullhaj	73 kg	Dris (ALG); L 00–11	—	—	Bayan (SYR); L 00–10	—	—	9
Erson Ramaj	90 kg	Pirelli (ITA); L 00–10	—	—	—	—	—	10

== Shooting ==
Albania competed in shooting.

== Swimming ==
Albania competed in swimming.

Men

Athlete	Event	Heat		Final	
Athlete	Event	Time	Rank	Time	Rank
Frenkli Vogli	50 m backstroke	27.99	18	did not advance	
Frenkli Vogli	100 m backstroke	1:00.50	18	did not advance	
Frenkli Vogli	200 m backstroke	2:14.20	15	did not advance	
Drini Ujkashej	50 m freestyle	27.11	20	did not advance	
Drini Ujkashej	100 m freestyle	59.37	21	did not advance	
Drini Ujkashej	50 m butterfly	29.88	19	did not advance	

Women

Athlete	Event	Heat		Final	
Athlete	Event	Time	Rank	Time	Rank
Sara Dande	200 m freestyle	2:19.31	16	did not advance	
Sara Dande	400 m freestyle	4:47.68	14	did not advance	
Sara Dande	800 m freestyle	—		9:52.17	7

== Taekwondo ==
Albania competed in Taekwondo.

Legend

- PTG — Won by Points Gap
- SUP — Won by superiority
- OT — Won on over time (Golden Point)
- DQ — Won by disqualification
- PUN — Won by punitive declaration
- WD — Won by withdrawal

Men

Athlete	Event	Round of 32	Round of 16	Quarterfinals	Semifinals	Final	Rank
Juirdo Cani	68 kg	Bye	Pilavakis (CYP); W 26-24	Brečić (CRO); L 10-42^{PTG}	—	—	5

== Tennis ==
Albania competed in tennis.

Men

Athlete	Event	First Round	Quarterfinals	Semifinals	Final / BM	
Athlete	Event	Opposition Result	Opposition Result	Opposition Result	Opposition Result	Rank
Martin Muedini	Singles	López Montagud (ESP); L 0–6, 1–6	did not advance			

Women

Athlete	Event	First Round	Second Round	Quarterfinals	Semifinals	Final / BM
Athlete	Event	Opposition Result	Opposition Result	Opposition Result	Opposition Result	Rank
Gresi Bajri	Singles	Bye	Sönmez (TUR); L 1–6, 2–6	did not advance		
Kristal Dule	Singles	Bechri (TUN); L 1–6, 1–6	did not advance			

== Weightlifting ==
Albania won one medal in weightlifting.

Men

Athlete	Event	Snatch		Clean & Jerk	
Athlete	Event	Result	Rank	Result	Rank
Erkand Qerimaj	73 kg	149	2nd place, silver medalist(s)	—	—
Albert Meta	+102 kg	151	5	180	5

== Wrestling ==
Albania won two medals in wrestling.

Men's Freestyle

Athlete	Event	Round of 16	Quarterfinal	Semifinal	Repechage	Final / BM	Rank
Zelimkhan Abakarov	65 kg	Bye	Aktaş (TUR); W 8-4	Mićić (SRB); W 9-0	—	Hafez (EGY); W 11-0	1st place, gold medalist(s)
Islam Dudaev	74 kg	—	Ak (TUR); L 3-6	—	—	Ikkal (ALG); W 8-0	3rd place, bronze medalist(s)
Osman Hajdari	86 kg	Bye	Iglesias (ESP); W 3-2	Erdin (TUR); L 0-10	—	Charalambos (CYP); L 1-6	5

Men's Greco-Roman

Athlete	Event	Round of 16	Quarterfinal	Semifinal	Repechage	Final / BM	Rank
Bajram Sina	60 kg	Bye	Alnakdali (SYR); L 0-9	—	—	—	9
Gjete Prenga	67 kg	—	Abdelrahman (EGY); L 0-9	—	—	—	8
Kevin Kupi	77 kg	Gumilar (SLO); W 10-0	Nemeš (SRB); L 1-10	—	Abouelatta (EGY); L 0-9	—	7
