= Elizabeth Onuah =

Nigerian weightlifter

Onuah Elizabeth
Personal information
- Born: September 20, 1995 (age 30) Edo State, Nigeria
- Height: 1.62 m (5 ft 4 in)
Medal record
Women's Weightlifting
Representing Nigeria
African Games
Disqualified	2015 Brazzaville	–53 kg

Onuah Elizabeth (born September 20, 1995) is a female Nigerian weightlifter. She won two gold medals in clean and jerk and snatch lifts after she made her debut representing Nigeria at the 2015 All-Africa Games in Congo Brazzaville.
