= Albania at the 2018 Mediterranean Games =

- IOC code: ALB
- NOC: Albanian National Olympic Committee

in Tarragona, Spain
- Competitors: 41 in 14 sports
- Medals Ranked 20th: Gold 1 Silver 1 Bronze 0 Total 2

Mediterranean Games appearances (overview)
- 1987; 1991; 1993; 1997; 2001; 2005; 2009; 2013; 2018; 2022

Albania (ALB) competed at the 2018 Mediterranean Games in Tarragona, Spain, from the 22 June to 1 July 2018 and was represented by the Albanian National Olympic Committee (KOKSH).

== Medalists ==
Medal	Name	Sport	Event	Date
Gold	Luiza Gega	Athletics	Women's 3000 metres steeplechase	28 June
Silver	Krenar Zeneli	Boxing	Men's bantamweight	30 June

== Swimming ==
Albania competed in swimming.

Men

Athlete	Event	Heat		Final	
Athlete	Event	Time	Rank	Time	Rank
Franci Aleksi	200 m freestyle	2:01.33	21	Did not advance	
Franci Aleksi	400 m freestyle	4:13.04	18	Did not advance	

Women

Athlete	Event	Heat		Final	
Athlete	Event	Time	Rank	Time	Rank
Nikol Merizaj	50 m freestyle	27.21 NR	17	Did not advance	
Nikol Merizaj	100 m freestyle	58.97 NR	18	Did not advance	
Nikol Merizaj	200 m freestyle	DNS		Did not advance	
