= Esraa El-Sayed =

Egyptian weightlifter (born 1998)

Esraa Ahmed
Personal information
- Full name: Esraa Elsayed Rashed Elsayed Ahmed
- Nationality: Egyptian
- Born: 21 November 1998 (age 27)
- Height: 150 cm (4 ft 11 in)
- Weight: 62 kg (137 lb)

Sport
- Sport: Weightlifting
- Event: -63 kg
Medal record
Women's weightlifting
Representing Egypt
Mediterranean Games
Silver medal – second place	2013 Mersin	58 kg
African Games
Silver medal – second place	2015 Brazzaville	63 kg
- Updated on 24 August 2016

Esraa Elsayed Rashed Elsayed Ahmed (Arabic: إسراء السيد راشد السيد أحمد; born 21 November 1998) is an Egyptian weightlifter. At the 2016 Summer Olympics she competed in the Women's 63 kg. She won silver medals at the 2013 Mediterranean Games in the 58 kg event, and at the 2015 African Games in the 63 kg event.

== Major competitions ==
Year	Venue	Weight	Snatch (kg)				Clean & Jerk (kg)				Total	Rank
Year	Venue	Weight	1	2	3	Rank	1	2	3	Rank	Total	Rank
Mediterranean Games
2013	Mersin, Turkey	58 kg	80	84	86	—N/a	97	101	~~106~~	—N/a	187	2nd place, silver medalist(s)
