= Albania at the 2005 Mediterranean Games =

- IOC code: ALB
- NOC: Albanian National Olympic Committee

in Almería
- Competitors: 58 in 5 sports
- Medals Ranked 17th: Gold 0 Silver 2 Bronze 4 Total 6

Mediterranean Games appearances (overview)
- 1987; 1991; 1993; 1997; 2001; 2005; 2009; 2013; 2018; 2022

Albania (ALB) competed at the 2005 Mediterranean Games in Almería, Spain with a total number of 58 participants (35 men and 23 women).

== Medals ==
=== Silver ===
Weightlifting

- Men's – 85 kg (Snatch): Ilirian Suli
- Women's – 53 kg (Clean&Jerk): Fetie Kasaj

=== Bronze ===
Athletics

- Women's 400 metres: Klodiana Shala

Weightlifting

- Women's – 58 kg (Snatch): Romela Begaj
- Men's – 62 kg (Clean&Jerk): Gert Trasha
- Men's – 85 kg (Clean&Jerk): Ilirian Suli

== Results by event ==
Athletics

- Women's 400 metres
  - Klodiana Shala

Boxing

- Men's Flyweight (– 51 kg)
  - Artur Gavoçeja
- Men's Welterweight (– 69 kg)
  - Artur Muedini
- Men's Super Heavyweight (+ 91 kg)
  - Nelson Hysa

Rowing

- Women's Single Sculls
  - Ilda Theka

Swimming

- Men's Competition
  - David Alliu
  - Malbor Oshafi
  - Klajd Vrahoriti
- Women's Competition
  - Tiziana Jakova
  - Rovena Marku

Volleyball

- Men's Team Competition
  - Dritan Çuko
  - Bledar Doçi
  - Arben Dunisha
  - Klodian Ferhati
  - Altin Gorenxa
  - Aurel Kaja
  - Klodian Kasa
  - Naim Limanaj
  - Genti Lundra
  - Roland Tarja
  - Elton Tukseferi
  - Enea Xhelati
- Women's Team Competition
  - Marsela Çalleku
  - Denisa Çarçani
  - Lapardhoti Dorina
  - Merlin Fagu
  - Anila Hoxha
  - Edlira Huqi
  - Geralda Neli
  - Amarilda Prenga
  - Jonida Sallaku
  - Kleda Shkurti
  - Jonida Shollo
  - Rubena Sukaj

== See also ==
- Albania at the 2004 Summer Olympics
- Albania at the 2008 Summer Olympics
