= Rasaq Tanimowo =

Nigerian weightlifter (born 1992)

Personal information
- Born: 9 September 1992 (age 33) Lagos State, Nigeria
- Height: 1.76 m (5 ft 9 in)
- Weight: 56 kg (123 lb)
Medal record
Men's Weightlifting
Representing Nigeria
All-Africa Games
| Silver medal – second place | 2015 All-Africa Games | –56 kg |

Rasaq Tanimowo (born 9 September 1992) is a male Nigerian weightlifter. On 10 September 2015, he won two silver medals in weightlifting while representing Nigeria at the 2015 All-Africa Games in Brazzaville. Prior to the 2015 All-Africa Games, he also represented Nigeria at the 2014 Commonwealth Games in Glasgow, Scotland.

== Major competitions ==
| Year | Venue | Weight | Snatch (kg) | | | | Clean & Jerk (kg) | | | | Total | Rank |
| Year | Venue | Weight | 1 | 2 | 3 | Rank | 1 | 2 | 3 | Rank | Total | Rank |
Commonwealth Games
| 2014 | Glasgow, Scotland | 56 kg | 95 | ~~97~~ | ~~100~~ | —N/a | 125 | ~~130~~ | 130 | —N/a | 225 | 6 |
African Games
| 2015 | (Republic of the Congo) Brazzaville, Congo | 56 kg | ~~100~~ | ~~100~~ | 100 | 4 | 127 | ~~131~~ | 131 | 2nd place, silver medalist(s) | 231 | 2nd place, silver medalist(s) |
