= David Kavelasvili =

Greek weightlifter (born 1985)

David Kavelasvili (Georgian: დავით ყაველაშვილი, Greek: Δαβίδ Καβελασβίλι; born 2 August 1985) is a Georgian-born Greek weightlifter. He competed for Greece at the 2012 Summer Olympics.
