= Agnès Chiquet =

French weightlifter (born 1984)

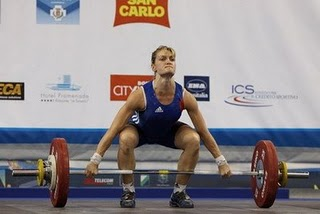
- Chiquet at the 2009 Mediterranean Games

Personal information
- Full name: Agnès Charlotta Monique Chiquet
- Nationality: French
- Born: 24 October 1984 (age 42) Paris, France
Medal record
Women's weightlifting
Representing France
Mediterranean Games
Bronze medal – third place	2009 Pescara	58 kg clean & jerk

Agnès Chiquet (born 24 October 1984 in Paris) is a French weightlifter.

She competed at the 2002 European Junior Championships, winning a bronze medal, 2009 Mediterranean Games winning a bronze medal, and 2006 European Union Tournament winning a gold medal.

She was French champion in 2016, 2018, and 2019.
