= Mateus Shkreta =

Albanian footballer

Personal information
- Full name: Mateus Shkreta
- Date of birth: 16 April 1994 (age 32)
- Place of birth: Tirana, Albania
- Height: 1.84 m (6 ft 0 in)
- Position: Forward

Youth career
- –2012: Sparta Prague
- 2012–2014: FK Teplice
2014–2015	→ Kastrioti (loan)	3	(0)
2015	Internacional Tirana		

International career
Years	Team	Apps	(Gls)
2010	Albania U17	3	(0)
2010–2011	Albania U19	0	(0)
2013–	Albania U21	2	(0)

Mateus Shkreta (born 16 April 1994 in Tirana) is an Albanian footballer who currently plays as a forward.

== Club career ==
As a youth player, he played for Czech sides Sparta Prague and FK Teplice.
