= Esmat Mansour =

Egyptian weightlifter (born 1986)

Personal information
- Full name: Essmat Mansour El Sayed
- Born: November 20, 1986 (age 38)
- Height: 1.65 m (5 ft 5 in)
- Weight: 69 kg (152 lb)

Sport
- Country: Egypt
- Sport: Weightlifting
- Event: 90kg
- Updated on 26 July 2012

Essmat Mansour El Sayed (عِصمَت مَنصُور, born November 20, 1986) is an Egyptian weightlifter who competed in the Women's 58 kg at the 2005 World Championships in Doha, Qatar and reached the 6th spot with 204 kg in total. In 2009, she established six new African weightlifting records. She competed in the women's -69 kg at the 2012 Summer Olympics, finishing seventh. She was born in Alexandria.
