= Mamdum Seldum =

Nigerian weightlifter (born 1992)

Personal information
- Full name: Mamdum Dickson Seldum
- Born: 23 September 1992 (age 33)
- Weight: 76.98 kg (169.7 lb)

Sport
- Country: Nigeria
- Sport: Weightlifting
- Weight class: 77 kg
- Team: National team
- Updated on 19 October 2016

Mamdum Dickson Seldum (born 23 September 1992) is a Nigerian male weightlifter, competing in the 77 kg category and representing Nigeria at international competitions. He won the silver medal at the 2015 African Games, lifting a total of 320 kg. He participated at the 2014 Commonwealth Games in the 77 kg event.

== Major competitions ==
| Year | Venue | Weight | Snatch (kg) | | | | Clean & Jerk (kg) | | | | Total | Rank |
| Year | Venue | Weight | 1 | 2 | 3 | Rank | 1 | 2 | 3 | Rank | Total | Rank |
Commonwealth Games
| 2014 | Glasgow, Scotland | 77 kg | 132 | 138 | ~~143~~ | —N/a | ~~166~~ | ~~167~~ | --- | —N/a | 0 | --- |
