= 2013 African Weightlifting Championships =

International weightlifting competition

The results of the 2013 African Weightlifting Championships

== 56 kg Men ==
Rank	Name	Born	Nation	B.weight	Group	Snatch	CI&Jerk	Total
1	CHIGAR Abdeghani	20.02.1989	MAR	55.80	A	92	120	212
2	KRAYDI Faouzi	06.04.1997	TUN	55.20	A	98	113	211
3	ANDRIANTSITOHAINA Eric Herman	21.07.1991	MAD	55.20	A	90	120	210
4	MOHAMED Tubal	23.03.1989	LBA	55.20	A	75	115	190

== 62 kg Men ==
Rank	Name	Born	Nation	B.weight	Group	Snatch	CI&Jerk	Total
1	MAROUEN Watreni	28.04.1995	TUN	61.60	A	115	147	262
2	MAIRIF Souhail	13.02.1983	ALG	61.80	A	110	146	256
3	MOUSSA Abdella Khalifa Mohamed	12.01.1992	LBA	61.20	A	110	141	251
4	CONFIANCE Rick Yves	24.05.1994	SEY	61.40	A	102	125	227
5	MOHAD Fras	09.03.1994	LBA	61.20	A	105	120	225
---	AFOUNAS Abdelgalil	18.11.1987	MAR	61.40	A	85	---	---

== 69 kg Men ==
Rank	Name	Born	Nation	B.weight	Group	Snatch	CI&Jerk	Total
1	BEN HNIA Karem	13.11.1994	TUN	68.80	A	143	178	321
2	TUBAL Maraj S.Omer	10.01.1994	LBA	68.20	A	120	140	260
3	LABRAK Abdessamad	14.06.1989	MAR	67.00	A	105	132	237

== 77 kg Men ==
Rank	Name	Born	Nation	B.weight	Group	Snatch	CI&Jerk	Total
1	BAHLOUL Rami	29.07.1991	TUN	75.20	A	151	180	331
2	FARDJALLAH Housseyn	16.01.1993	ALG	76.40	A	140	175	315
3	YANOU KETCHANKE Jean Baptiste	19.07.1993	CMR	76.80	A	137	173	310
4	NGONGANG TCHUISSI Guy Michel	18.02.1995	CMR	75.20	A	125	155	280
5	ATTAR Abdelatif	26.01.1981	MAR	71.80	A	115	132	247
6	GRAHAM Brandon	14.06.1996	RSA	76.20	A	105	135	240

== 85 kg Men ==
Rank	Name	Born	Nation	B.weight	Group	Snatch	CI&Jerk	Total
1	MEKKI Abdallah	17.08.1985	ALG	84.40	A	145	180	325
2	ELIAS Alanani	05.10.1995	LBA	83.80	A	110	141	251
3	ETTALEB Mustapha	29.08.1986	MAR	79.00	A	110	130	240
4	COME Dereck Christian	11.02.1996	SEY	83.60	A	96	116	212
---	MINKOUMBA Petit David	27.02.1989	CMR	84.80	A	142	---	---

== 94 kg Men ==
Rank	Name	Born	Nation	B.weight	Group	Snatch	CI&Jerk	Total
1	DOGHMANE Mohamed Amine	11.05.1991	TUN	93.60	A	160	195	355
2	MESSAOUI Saddam	24.07.1991	ALG	86.60	A	147	180	327
3	BOUDANI Maamar	23.06.1984	ALG	93.60	A	145	181	326
4	LAGSIR Abdelali	10.04.1990	MAR	92.60	A	127	175	302
5	CYRILLE FAGAT Tchatchet II	01.08.1995	CMR	85.40	A	122	155	277
6	BERTALI Zakaria	07.10.1985	MAR	93.20	A	117	150	267
7	LARKYNE Nii Otoo	11.11.1995	GHA	88.20	A	100	125	225
8	SEYIMANI Sythembele	04.11.1994	RSA	92.00	A	105	110	215

== 105 kg Men ==
Rank	Name	Born	Nation	B.weight	Group	Snatch	CI&Jerk	Total
1	BIDANI Walid	11.06.1994	ALG	105.00	A	163	191	354
2	ELWADDANI Abdulmoneim	06.09.1991	LBA	104.00	A	162	187	349
3	BAKADI Ayoub	17.12.1994	MAR	99.40	A	127	165	292
4	NGONGANG TANTCHOU Ferdianand	24.05.1977	CMR	97.40	A	126	150	276
5	HOLTZHAUSEN Jacobus	12.01.1996	RSA	100.00	A	110	126	236
6	TACKIE Theophilus	30.07.1995	GHA	100.40	A	105	120	225

== +105 kg Men ==
Rank	Name	Born	Nation	B.weight	Group	Snatch	CI&Jerk	Total
1	MIMOUNE Abdelhamid	08.03.1988	ALG	117.40	A	150	190	340
2	ELJADID ELAZIBI Abdalla Salem	21.01.1995	LBA	130.60	A	135	162	297
3	ALANANI Ibrahim Ehmeda	04.06.1993	LBA	118.40	A	127	163	290
4	ABOTSI Albert Kwame Mensah	20.06.1981	GHA	108.60	A	115	160	275

== 48 kg Women ==
Rank	Name	Born	Nation	B.weight	Group	Snatch	CI&Jerk	Total
1	DIK Soumia	19.10.1988	MAR	43.80	A	55	65	120

== 53 kg Women ==
Rank	Name	Born	Nation	B.weight	Group	Snatch	CI&Jerk	Total
1	LANDOULSI Nouha	05.05.1998	TUN	49.40	A	70	86	156
2	SIBAR Sara	28.08.1995	MAR	50.60	A	63	79	142
3	BAFFOE Ruth	07.11.1994	GHA	52.40	A	62	77	139
4	BENMILOUD Meryem Nada	26.09.1997	ALG	52.80	A	56	63	119
5	KARIM Youssra	26.03.1997	MAR	52.20	A	45	55	100

== 58 kg Women ==
Rank	Name	Born	Nation	B.weight	Group	Snatch	CI&Jerk	Total
1	MEJRI Oumaima	22.08.1994	TUN	57.60	A	70	88	158
2	JERNANE Hind	22.09.1992	MAR	53.80	A	55	73	128
3	HAMMOU Kheira	08.03.1997	ALG	57.00	A	51	71	122
4	LARUE Romentha	06.04.1998	SEY	57.80	A	50	60	110

== 63 kg Women ==
Rank	Name	Born	Nation	B.weight	Group	Snatch	CI&Jerk	Total
1	EPIE Osoungu Ndoua	11.10.1983	CMR	60.40	A	74	87	161
2	CHERRARA Ikram	06.06.1998	ALG	62.00	A	64	84	148
---	RAVOLOLONIAINA Elisa Vania	24.02.1992	MAD	61.40	A	67	---	---

== 69 kg Women ==
Rank	Name	Born	Nation	B.weight	Group	Snatch	CI&Jerk	Total
1	FEGUE Marie Josephe	28.05.1991	CMR	66.60	A	103	128	231
2	HASSINE Ghada	17.05.1993	TUN	65.00	A	97	117	214
3	ARKOH Juliana	21.08.1997	GHA	60.00	A	63	75	138
3	RANAIVOSOA Marie Hanitra Roilya	14.11.1990	MRI	68.20	A	71	95	166
4	TORCHI Rachida	04.10.1984	ALG	65.80	A	71	87	158
5	CHAIMAE Charkaoni	19.06.1997	MAR	65.20	A	40	55	95

== 75 kg Women ==
Rank	Name	Born	Nation	B.weight	Group	Snatch	CI&Jerk	Total
1	GUEZMIR Sirine	16.09.1994	TUN	73.40	A	85	96	181
2	MIYENGA Helene Laure	17.11.1984	CMR	73.60	A	77	95	172
3	SLIMANE Assia	11.03.1986	ALG	74.40	A	68	97	165
4	OUASS Samira	22.04.1992	MAR	70.00	A	62	80	142

== +75 kg Women ==
Rank	Name	Born	Nation	B.weight	Group	Snatch	CI&Jerk	Total
1	DHIEB Yosra	31.08.1995	TUN	102.80	A	92	112	204
2	VALAYDON Shalinee	13.04.1986	MRI	111.40	A	86	113	199
3	ABOTSI Dora Afi	22.02.1991	GHA	76.40	A	81	100	181
4	AMMOURI Wafa	28.01.1985	MAR	79.80	A	72	102	174
5	MEUKEUGNI NOUMBISSI Clementine	01.10.1990	CMR	93.20	A	72	102	174
6	UM Albertine Flore	17.08.1989	CMR	81.60	A	75	95	170
7	SAHRAOUI Fatima Zohra	27.09.1996	ALG	90.00	A	47	65	112
