= Bilikis Abiodun Otunla =

Nigerian weightlifter

Bilkis Otunla
Personal information
- Full name: Bilkis Abiodun Otunla
- Nationality: Nigerian
- Born: 12 June 1994 (age 32) Nigeria
- Weight: 48 kg (106 lb)

Sport
- Sport: Weightlifting
- Event: 69 - 75 kg
Medal record
Representing Nigeria
Women's weightlifting
Commonwealth Games
Gold medal – first place	2015 African Games	Women's 69 - 75 kg
- Updated on May 2020

Bilikis Abiodun Otunla (born June 12, 1994) is a Nigerian weightlifter. She competed in the 2015 African Games and she won gold medals in the women's 69 kg category - Clean and jerk 1ST (Gold), Women's 69 – 75 kg category – Trekken 1ST (Gold) and Women's 69 – 75 kg – Total Gold She had also participated in the 2016, 2018 and 2019 of the African Games competitions winning gold at all of them except the 2019 which she was suspended after her win as a result of a failed anti-doping test, and the gold medal was not awarded to her. In 2019 she was banned until 2027 by the International Weightlifting Federation after testing positive for metenolone and metenolone metabolites.

== Competition participated ==
Please note, major results of Bilikis Abiodun Otunla may be incomplete, you can help complete it.

- 2019 African Championships

2019 - African Championships - Women's -81 kg - Total : 1st (Gold) 2019 - African Championships - Women's -81 kg - Snatch : 1st 2019 - African Championships - Women's -81 kg - Clean & Jerk : 1st

- 2018 World Championships

Women's -76 kg - Clean & Jerk 12 Women's -76 kg – Snatch 14 Women's -76 kg – Total 14

- 2017 COMMONWEALTH & OCEANIA CHAMPIONSHIPS
- 2016 - African Championships

2016 - African Championships - Women's 69 – 75 kg : Gold

- 2015 African Games

Women's 69 – 75 kg - Clean and jerk 1ST Women's 69 – 75 kg – Trekken 1ST Women's 69 – 75 kg – Total Gold

== Controversy ==
Bilikis Abiodun Otunla, who won gold in the -81 kg category at the 2019 African Weightlifting Championships was suspended following her failed anti-doping test, a result that saw her violating the anti-doping rule. However the International Weightlifting Federation (IWF) revealed a public disclosure on reports about the sample of her test, which says: "An Adverse Analytical Finding for metenolone and metenolone metabolite -1-methylene-5α-androstane-3α-ol-17-one (S1.1 Anabolic agents). As a consequence, the Athlete is provisionally suspended in view of a potential anti-doping rule violation. In any case, where it is determined that the Athlete did not commit an anti-doping rule violation, the relevant decision will also be published. IWF will not make any further comments on the case until it is closed."
