= Onyeka Azike =

Nigerian weightlifter (born 1990)

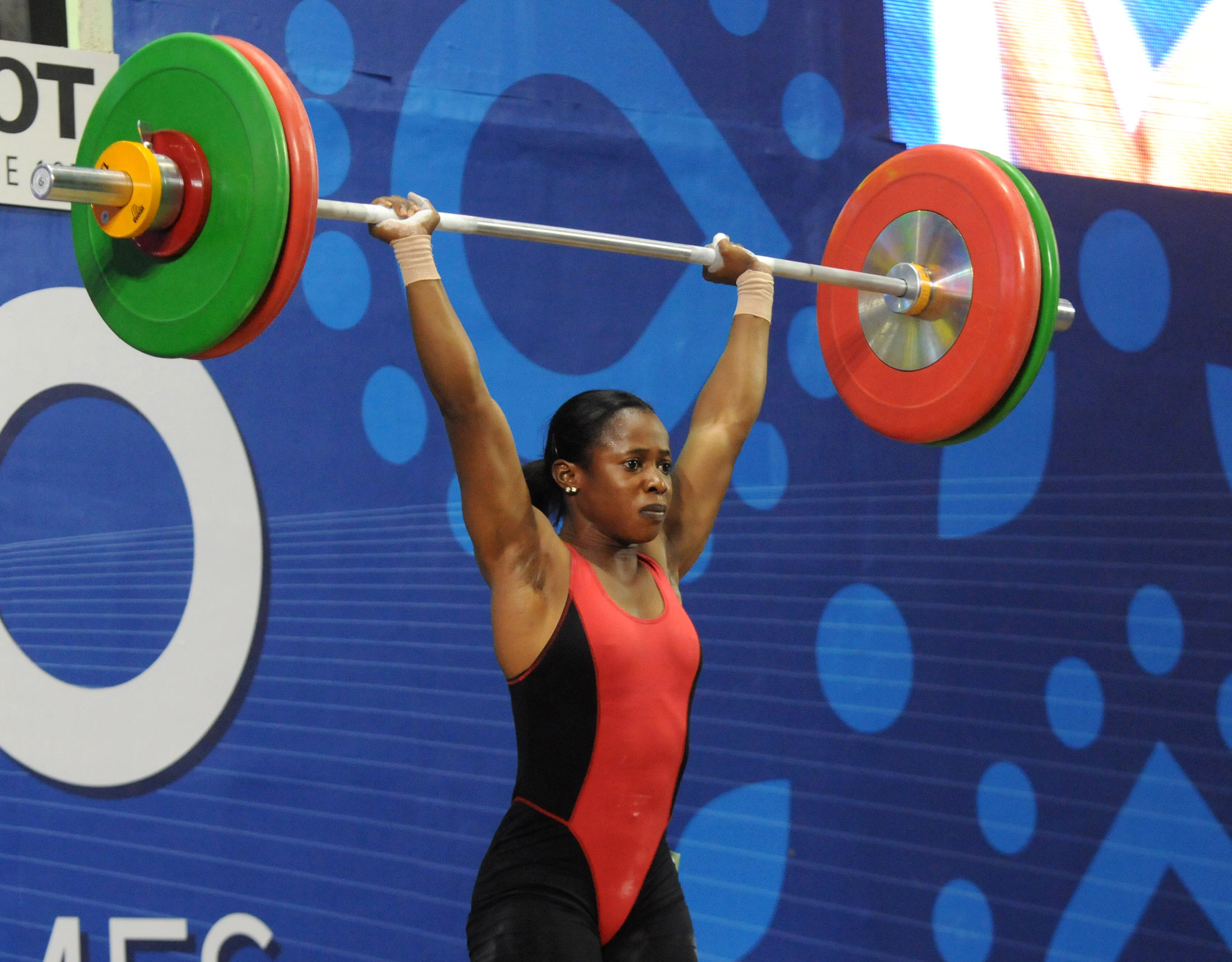
- Onyeka Azike at the XIX Commonwealth Games in 2010

Personal information
- Nationality: Nigerian
- Born: 1 June 1990 (age 36) Abia State, Nigeria
- Weight: 48 kg (106 lb)

Sport
- Sport: Weightlifting
- Event: 48 kg
Medal record
Representing Nigeria
Women's weightlifting
Commonwealth Games
Silver medal – second place	2006 Melbourne	Women's 53 kg
- Updated on September 2024

Onyeka Azike (born July 1, 1990) is a Nigerian weightlifter. She competed in the 2006 Commonwealth Games, won a silver medal in the women's 53 kg division at the 2006 Commonwealth Games in Melbourne, Australia, and won a gold medal in the 58 kg weightlifting category of the 2007 All Africa Games in Algeria.

== Career ==
Onyeka Azike first started her weightlifting career at the 2006 Commonwealth Games and won a silver medal in the women's 53 kg division at the 2006 Commonwealth Games in Melbourne, Australia. She then chose to participate in the 2010 World Weightlifting Championships and the Commonwealth Games Women's 48 – 53 kg category, winning a silver medal. When interviewed by a reporter, Azike urged more women to develop their talents in the sport, saying most young girls that are interested in weightlifting nurse the fear that they might not be able to have children. She also stated that a large number of female weightlifters are now mothers and have won laurels for their states and the nation at various national and international competitions.

"Women are really making waves in sports generally but particularly in weightlifting. I advise the young girls out there to come out and showcase their skills and maintain the standard.

"A lot of us have been able to make the country proud at various major games and some of us have had children, even after our participation at the competitions.

"There is no doubt; weightlifting requires lots of training which results to building of muscles, but even at that, it doesn't stop them from having children."

== Competitions ==
=== African Games 2015 ===
- Women's 53–58 kg—Clean and jerk 1st
- Women's 53–58 kg—Snatch 1st
- Women's 53–58 kg—Total Gold

=== World Championships 2011 ===
- Women's 53–58 kg—Clean & Jerk 22
- Women's 53–58 kg—Snatch 23
- World Championships Women's 53–58 kg—Total 23

=== Commonwealth Games 2010 ===
- Women's 48–53 kg 2
- Women's 53–58 kg—Silver
- Women's 53–58 kg—Total Silver

=== World Championships 2007 ===
- Women's - 48 kg—Clean & Jerk 25
- Women's - 48 kg—Snatch 26
- Women's - 48 kg—Total 26
