= Ibrahim Ramadan =

Egyptian weightlifter (born 1988)

Ibrahim Abdelbaki
Personal information
- Full name: Ibrahim Ramadan Ibrahim Abdelbaki
- Nationality: Egypt
- Born: 6 February 1988 (age 38)
- Height: 173 cm (5 ft 8 in)
- Weight: 77 kg (170 lb)

Sport
- Sport: Weightlifting
- Event: -77 kg
Medal record
Men's weightlifting
Representing Egypt
African Games
Silver medal – second place	2007 Algiers	-77 kg
- Updated on 24 August 2016

Ibrahim Ramadan Ibrahim Abdelbaki (born 6 February 1988 in Fayyum, Egypt) is an Egyptian weightlifter competing in the 77 kg category. He placed fifth at the 2012 Summer Olympics with a clean and jerk of 192 kg, and a snatch of 155 kg, giving a total of 347 kg. He finished in 9th in the same division at the 2016 Summer Olympics, with a snatch of 152 kg and a clean and jerk of 196 kg, giving a total of 338 kg.
