= 2008 African Weightlifting Championships =

2008 African Championships
- Host city: Strand, South Africa
- Dates: May

The 2008 African Weightlifting Championships was held in Strand, South Africa in May 2008.

== 56 kg Men ==
Rank	Name	Born	Nation	B.weight	Group	Snatch	CI&Jerk	Total
1	AKPAN Emmanuel	1 January 1988	Nigeria	55.98	A	106	130	236
2	LARIKI Elhabib	3 November 1987	Algeria	55.54	A	97	121	218
3	MATAM David	2 October 1982	Cameroon	55.67	A	95	121	216
4	PHILLIPS Luwellyne Andrew	21 August 1989	South Africa	55.59	A	96	115	211
5	BENAMI Nafaa	8 November 1974	Algeria	55.16	A	97	110	207
6	LAFRIK El Mehdi	1 January 1991	Morocco	55.30	A	80	100	180

== 62 kg Men ==
Rank	Name	Born	Nation	B.weight	Group	Snatch	CI&Jerk	Total
1	ABDELBAKI Mohamed Abdeltawwab I.	18 July 1987	Egypt	61.92	A	130	156	286
2	OLUPONA Gbenga	1 January 1981	Nigeria	61.70	A	115	156	271
3	MEHREZ Selmi	1 January 1978	Tunisia	61.83	A	111	147	258
4	NGAMBA Simon	24 December 1982	Cameroon	61.72	A	117	135	252
5	BELINGA Joseph Ekani	23 June 1989	Cameroon	61.93	A	110	130	240
6	ANDRIANTSIRY Charles	11 March 1980	Madagascar	62.00	A	105	135	240
7	BELGHSEN Rodwan	1 January 1986	Libya	61.09	A	106	130	236
8	KATAMBA Ismail	19 January 1987	Uganda	60.63	A	97	135	232
9	NABIL Renard	1 January 1985	Morocco	62.00	A	95	120	215
---	KIVUMBI Mubarak Musoke	1 December 1989	Uganda	61.43	A	105	---	---
---	ZACHADI Abdelillah	1 January 1983	Morocco	61.73	A	---	---	---

== 69 kg Men ==
Rank	Name	Born	Nation	B.weight	Group	Snatch	CI&Jerk	Total
1	SBAI Youssef	20 September 1978	Tunisia	68.93	A	143	171	314
2	ABDELAZIM Tarek Yehia Fouad	18 May 1987	Egypt	68.90	A	142	163	305
3	MATAM Kingue Bernadin	20 May 1990	Cameroon	68.20	A	135	165	300
4	AYENUWA Yinka	2 May 1986	Nigeria	68.07	A	128	170	298
5	ISIAKA Aliyu	15 April 1985	Nigeria	68.53	A	130	160	290
6	SHUSHU Otsile Greg	20 August 1980	South Africa	66.26	A	125	160	285
7	JOMNI Hamza	22 January 1989	Tunisia	68.33	A	121	160	281
8	CHERABA Abdelfettah	23 November 1984	Algeria	68.85	A	121	155	276
9	AATAR Abdellatif	26 January 1987	Morocco	68.58	A	115	140	255
10	DU PLOOY Lyle William Henry	2 August 1988	South Africa	67.44	A	112	135	247
11	SSEBAALE Mike	2 July 1989	Uganda	68.49	A	100	135	235
12	ETTALEB Mustapha	29 August 1986	Morocco	67.99	A	100	130	230
13	SHABALALA Makhosemhlaba	6 April 1981	Swaziland	67.97	A	96	131	227
14	MONIEN Magarajen	9 March 1981	Mauritius	68.87	A	100	115	215
---	SIMEON Romeo Teofilo	11 February 1977	Seychelles	68.71	A	105	---	---

== 77 kg Men ==
Rank	Name	Born	Nation	B.weight	Group	Snatch	CI&Jerk	Total
1	FISAL El Haddad Mahmoud	10 March 1986	Egypt	76.65	A	146	190	336
2	EKPO Felix	10 September 1981	Nigeria	76.15	A	150	185	335
3	ANTHONY Darryn	18 December 1985	South Africa	76.70	A	143	172	315
4	SARHAN Nizar	13 June 1989	Tunisia	75.74	A	138	172	310
5	ELKEKLI Ali Moftah Said	4 September 1989	Libya	76.59	A	132	160	292
6	MINKOUMBA Petit David	27 February 1989	Cameroon	76.49	A	126	160	286
7	BELHOUT Amir	25 May 1989	Algeria	75.79	A	128	155	283
8	CUPIDO Stephen	24 January 1986	South Africa	74.17	A	120	150	270
9	FAHIM Mohamed	1 January 1984	Morocco	76.46	A	122	147	269
10	BATUUSA Kalidi	25 November 1986	Uganda	73.76	A	108	130	238
---	SIMEON Charles Albert	16 June 1982	Seychelles	76.38	A	---	145	---

== 85 kg Men ==
Rank	Name	Born	Nation	B.weight	Group	Snatch	CI&Jerk	Total
1	ULOKO Benedict	19 March 1984	Nigeria	84.66	A	150	191	341
2	ESHTIWI Mohamed	8 February 1985	Libya	84.57	A	155	185	340
3	BATCHAYA KETCHANKE Brice Vivien	16 August 1985	Cameroon	82.67	A	145	175	320
4	TARIQ Mabchour	2 October 1981	Morocco	79.85	A	110	141	251
5	MATSEBULA Linda	2 April 1983	Swaziland	82.77	A	105	145	250
6	DIXIE Terence Nigel	15 October 1983	Seychelles	82.14	A	110	137	247
7	BALIGEYA Godfrey	28 July 1987	Uganda	83.65	A	106	140	246
---	SDIRI Ali	21 May 1983	Tunisia	84.66	A	---	---	---

== 94 kg Men ==
Rank	Name	Born	Nation	B.weight	Group	Snatch	CI&Jerk	Total
1	EL NAGAR Mohamed	5 August 1984	Egypt	93.94	A	156	190	346
2	ABUKHALIA Hamza	1 January 1980	Libya	93.95	A	152	190	342
3	OKOLI Chukwuka	26 February 1980	Nigeria	93.96	A	147	185	332
4	DOGHMANE Hamdi	19 March 1987	Tunisia	85.93	A	145	175	320
5	UNUSOTAME Paul Oghenekevwe	23 October 1985	Nigeria	88.72	A	140	162	302
6	BOUDANI Maamar	23 June 1984	Algeria	87.21	A	125	170	295
7	BHOLLAH Ravi	28 September 1981	Mauritius	93.53	A	132	150	282
---	CHOUYA Rabeh	10 September 1988	Algeria	90.11	A	---	173	---
DSQ	SHTEWI Abdelrahman	1 January 1989	Libya	92.58	A	---	---	---

== 105 kg Men ==
Rank	Name	Born	Nation	B.weight	Group	Snatch	CI&Jerk	Total
1	MOEZ Hannachi	20 February 1980	Tunisia	100.42	A	173	185	358
2	MIMOUNE Abdelhamid	8 March 1988	Algeria	97.59	A	142	170	312
3	EL KADRI Sami	2 May 1982	Tunisia	94.26	A	141	165	306
4	BOOYSEN Henk	1 November 1972	South Africa	104.74	A	135	165	300
5	SOUFIANE Kourim	16 February 1972	Morocco	98.06	A	112	140	252
6	FERLEY Dominic	3 May 1991	Seychelles	104.28	A	110	130	240
7	KALYANGO Deo	20 January 1988	Uganda	99.92	A	90	140	230
DSQ	KHALIFA Abdalla	16 February 1972	Libya	94.94	A	---	---	---
DSQ	ELADHEM Salaheddin	5 September 1974	Libya	104.47	A	---	---	---

== +105 kg Men ==
Rank	Name	Born	Nation	B.weight	Group	Snatch	CI&Jerk	Total
1	MASSOUD Mohamed Ehsan Attia	11 January 1984	Egypt	149.42	A	182	230	412
2	KEMADJOU Danny	22 October 1984	Cameroon	120.24	A	150	180	330
3	FOKEJOU TEFOT Frederic	3 December 1979	Cameroon	119.88	A	140	175	315
4	KEROUI Tewfik	9 May 1981	Algeria	105.37	A	135	170	305
5	AINSLIE William	2 August 1979	South Africa	125.00	A	135	170	305
6	PRETORIUS Jan	30 November 1975	South Africa	123.11	A	135	166	301
DSQ	HSHAD Mustafa	18 December 1970	Libya	137.57	A	---	---	--

== 48 kg Women ==
Rank	Name	Born	Nation	B.weight	Group	Snatch	CI&Jerk	Total
1	FEDELIS Chineye Silver	28 October 1993	Nigeria	47.93	A	66	95	161
2	AZIKE Onyeka	1 July 1990	Nigeria	47.44	A	68	90	158
3	VRIES Portia Charmaine	21 July 1984	South Africa	47.67	A	63	90	153
4	SAYED Enja	6 March 1983	Egypt	47.98	A	67	84	151
5	FILALI Kenza	27 December 1981	Algeria	47.22	A	65	81	146
6	ACHERIA Dalila	8 August 1981	Algeria	47.13	A	60	85	145
7	EHSSEINIA Henda	1 August 1984	Tunisia	47.99	A	64	81	145
8	THELEMAQUE Katsia	28 February 1989	Seychelles	46.00	A	60	70	130
9	DIK Soumia	19 October 1988	Morocco	42.79	A	45	60	105

== 53 kg Women ==
Rank	Name	Born	Nation	B.weight	Group	Snatch	CI&Jerk	Total
1	LAWAL Patience	28 December 1983	Nigeria	52.28	A	83	105	188
2	SOUMAYA Fatnassi	13 February 1980	Tunisia	52.93	A	78	96	174
3	HAMED Aaya	16 September 1989	Egypt	52.69	A	75	85	160
4	KOURI Safia	12 May 1974	Algeria	52.80	A	67	86	153
5	EDJANGUE EKONGOLO Agnes	23 December 1985	Cameroon	51.28	A	60	80	140
6	MAJIDI Amal	10 November 1983	Morocco	52.46	A	60	80	140
7	FOKOU Patricia	17 May 1987	Cameroon	52.51	A	60	70	130
8	KADIHAYA Assia	6 March 1989	Morocco	52.39	A	55	70	125
9	BOTHA Nicole	18 April 1990	South Africa	51.80	A	50	69	119
---	PRETORIUS Mariska	10 May 1992	South Africa	52.39	A	---	70	---

== 58 kg Women ==
Rank	Name	Born	Nation	B.weight	Group	Snatch	CI&Jerk	Total
1	UWAH Margaret	3 November 1983	Nigeria	57.28	A	93	117	210
2	HOSNI Nadia	29 August 1987	Tunisia	57.80	A	80	105	185
3	HASSAN Ranya	1 March 1991	Egypt	57.22	A	79	101	180
4	PRETORIUS Mona	12 August 1988	South Africa	56.87	A	78	100	178
5	ABDELRAHMAN Sara	10 December 1991	Egypt	57.84	A	77	101	178
6	MAY Nourhene	18 March 1991	Tunisia	57.38	A	82	93	175
7	AGRICOLE Clementina Ciana	18 July 1988	Seychelles	56.38	A	78	95	173
8	BAKAM TZUCHE Pilar	10 April 1988	Cameroon	56.19	A	65	97	162
9	MAJIDI Islam	18 March 1985	Morocco	56.33	A	65	82	147
10	MJEZU Zayanda	21 August 1992	South Africa	57.68	A	63	81	144
---	NDREMANAMBINA Phirobine	25 March 1988	Madagascar	55.97	A	65	---	---

== 63 kg Women ==
Rank	Name	Born	Nation	B.weight	Group	Snatch	CI&Jerk	Total
1	LASSOUANI Leila F.	29 July 1977	Algeria	62.46	A	90	115	205
2	OURFELLI Hanene	8 January 1986	Tunisia	62.54	A	92	109	201
3	MIYENGA Helene Laure	17 November 1984	Cameroon	61.85	A	80	100	180
4	NGUIDJOL ESSESSE Hortense	17 May 1981	Cameroon	62.72	A	70	105	175
5	BOUABDELAH Nabila	28 February 1986	Algeria	61.34	A	65	85	150
6	MASIU Matshidiso Hazel	6 May 1992	South Africa	58.86	A	61	82	143
DSQ	LOZAIQUE Brenda	5 April 1978	Seychelles	62.88	A	---	---	---

== 69 kg Women ==
Rank	Name	Born	Nation	B.weight	Group	Snatch	CI&Jerk	Total
1	ABIR ABDELRAHMAN Khalil Mahmoud Khalil	13 June 1992	Egypt	68.70	A	97	128	225
2	EGBUDIKE Agatha	20 February 1985	Nigeria	67.77	A	96	110	206
3	NAYO KETCHANKE Gaelle Verlaine	20 April 1988	Cameroon	66.88	A	85	115	200
4	THELERMONT Janet	5 January 1979	Seychelles	67.34	A	94	105	199
5	ELARBI Ahlem	15 April 1987	Tunisia	63.11	A	88	101	189
6	TORCHI Rachida	4 October 1984	Algeria	67.81	A	72	90	162
7	OUMNYA Kinana	1 January 1986	Morocco	64.10	A	50	60	110
---	SAMLALI Hafida	5 March 1973	Morocco	63.65	A	---	---	---

== 75 kg Women ==
Rank	Name	Born	Nation	B.weight	Group	Snatch	CI&Jerk	Total
1	ZAKARI Hadiza	10 September 1987	Nigeria	74.63	A	105	130	235
2	SMATI Mariem	31 October 1986	Tunisia	74.26	A	92	115	207
3	NDLELENI Babalwa	14 March 1979	South Africa	73.03	A	83	120	203
4	NALUBANGA Mariam	4 July 1986	Uganda	71.10	A	80	105	185
5	SLIMANE Assia	11 March 1986	Algeria	70.62	A	60	80	140

== +75 kg Women ==
Rank	Name	Born	Nation	B.weight	Group	Snatch	CI&Jerk	Total
1	USMAN Maryam	9 November 1990	Nigeria	113.09	A	115	150	265
2	EL SAYED Sally	1 December 1985	Egypt	90.34	A	101	126	227
3	IBRAHIEM MOHAMED Afaf	5 February 1989	Egypt	86.98	A	90	115	205
4	VALAYDON Shalinee	13 April 1986	Mauritius	95.44	A	72	92	164
5	FADIL Bahija	5 February 1976	Morocco	109.73	A	65	97	162
