= Erdemli Sports Hall =

Multi-sport arena in Erdemli, Turkey

- Erdemli Spor Salonu (Turkish)
- Location: Erdemli, Mersin Province, Turkey
- Owner: Youth Services and Sports Directoriate of Mersin
- Capacity: 750

Construction
- Opened: 1979; 47 years ago

The Erdemli Sports Hall (Turkish: Erdemli Spor Salonu) is a multi-sport indoor arena located at Erdemli district of Mersin Province, Turkey. Built in 1979, it is owned by the Youth Services and Sports Directoriate of Mersin. The sports hall has a seating capacity of 750, and hosts basketball, volleyball, gymnastics and some other sports events.

The venue hosted the weightlifting events of the 2013 Mediterranean Games on June 21–26.
