= Spain at the 2013 Mediterranean Games =

- IOC code: ESP
- NOC: Spanish Olympic Committee

in Mersin
- Competitors: 175 in 24 sports
- Medals Ranked th: Gold 21 Silver 32 Bronze 29 Total 82

Mediterranean Games appearances (overview)
- 1951; 1955; 1959; 1963; 1967; 1971; 1975; 1979; 1983; 1987; 1991; 1993; 1997; 2001; 2005; 2009; 2013; 2018; 2022

Spain competed at the 2013 Mediterranean Games in Mersin, Turkey from the 20th to 30 June 2013.

== Archery ==
Men

Athlete	Event	Ranking round		Round of 64	Round of 32	Round of 16	Quarterfinals	Semifinals	Final / BM	
Athlete	Event	Score	Seed	Opposition Score	Opposition Score	Opposition Score	Opposition Score	Opposition Score	Opposition Score	Rank
Elías Cuesta	Individual	651	5 Q	BYE	Bonelli (SMR); W 6–0	Bozlar (TUR); W 7–3	Fernández (ESP); L 4–6	Did not advance		
Antonio Fernández	Individual	654	4 Q	BYE	Loizou (CYP); W 6–0	Elkholosy (EGY); W 6–4	Cuesta (ESP); W 6–4	Yilmaz (TUR); W 6–4	Frangilli (ITA); W 6–5	1st place, gold medalist(s)
Juan Ignacio Rodríguez	Individual	670	1 Q	BYE	Paterakis (GRE); L 2–6	Did not advance				
Elías Cuesta; Antonio Fernández; Juan Ignacio Rodríguez	Team	1975	2 Q	—N/a		BYE	Cyprus (CYP); W 218–202	France (FRA); W 221–212	Egypt (EGY); L 210–211	2nd place, silver medalist(s)

Women

Athlete	Event	Ranking round		Round of 32	Round of 16	Quarterfinals	Semifinals	Final / BM	
Athlete	Event	Score	Seed	Opposition Score	Opposition Score	Opposition Score	Opposition Score	Opposition Score	Rank
Mirene Etxeberría	Individual	629	4 Q	BYE	Bozic (SLO); W 5–4	Planeix (FRA); W 6–0	Lokluoglu (TUR); W 6–0	Sartori (ITA); L 3–7	2nd place, silver medalist(s)
Elena Melodie Fernández	Individual	599	16 Q	Atla (GRE); W 7–6	Lokluoglu (TUR); L 0–6	Did not advance			
Magali Foulón	Individual	623	8 Q	BYE	Mansour (EGY); L 4–6	Did not advance			
Mirene Etxeberría; Elena Melodie Fernández; Magali Foulón	Team	1851	3 Q	—N/a	BYE	Slovenia (SLO); W 214–190	Greece (GRE); W 206–196	Italy (ITA); L 203–210	2nd place, silver medalist(s)

== Athletics ==
Key

- Note–Ranks given for track events are within the athlete's heat only
- Q = Qualified for the next round
- q = Qualified for the next round as a fastest loser or, in field events, by position without achieving the qualifying target
- NR = National record
- N/A = Round not applicable for the event
- Bye = Athlete not required to compete in round

Men
Track & road events

Athlete	Event	Semifinal		Final	
Athlete	Event	Result	Rank	Result	Rank
Sergio Ruiz	200 m	20.94	2 Q	20.74	3rd place, bronze medalist(s)
Mark Ujakpor	400 m	46.77	3 Q	46.53	5
Francisco Roldán	800 m	1:49.00	4	Did not advance	
Francisco Abad	1500 m	—N/a		3:40.06	6
Roger Puigbó	1500 m T54	3:23.52	2 Q	3:26.68	2nd place, silver medalist(s)
Jackson Quiñónez	110 m hurdles	13.99	3 Q	DNS	
Diego Cabello	400 m hurdles	50.15	1 Q	50.17	4
Roberto Alaiz	3000 m steeplechase	—N/a		8:42.61	8

Field events

Athlete	Event	Final	
Athlete	Event	Distance	Position
José Emilio Bellido	Triple jump	15,87 m.	6
Simón Siverio	High jump	2,15 m.	9
Borja Vivas	Shot put	19,99 m.	1st place, gold medalist(s)

Women
Track & road events

Athlete	Event	Semifinal		Final	
Athlete	Event	Result	Rank	Result	Rank
Estela García	100 m	11.69	2 Q	11.53	2nd place, silver medalist(s)
Estela García	200 m	24.05	5 Q	23.65	4
Elena García	1500 m	—N/a		4:15.00	7
Teresa Urbina	3000 m steeplechase	—N/a		DNF	
Raquel González	20 km walk	—N/a		1h.41:08	2nd place, silver medalist(s)

Field events

Athlete	Event	Final	
Athlete	Event	Distance	Position
Naroa Agirre	Pole vault	4,40 m.	2nd place, silver medalist(s)
Sabina Asenjo	Discus throw	53,25 m.	5
Noraida Bicet	Javelin throw	57,65 m.	3rd place, bronze medalist(s)
Berta Castells	Hammer throw	66,16 m.	2nd place, silver medalist(s)
Juliet Itoya	Long jump	6,23 m.	5

== Badminton ==
Athlete	Event	Group stage					Quarterfinal	Semifinal	Final / BM	
Athlete	Event	Opposition Score	Opposition Score	Opposition Score	Opposition Score	Rank	Opposition Score	Opposition Score	Opposition Score	Rank
Pablo Abián	Men's singles	Xanthou (GRE); W 21–8, 21–12	Choueiry (LIB); W 21–5, 21–3	Hölbling (CRO); W 21–7, 21–12	Greco (ITA); W 21–18, 21–16	1 Q	Greco (ITA); W 21–9, 21–8	Yingping (FRA); W 21–16, 21–7	Leverdez (FRA); W 17–21, 21–23	2nd place, silver medalist(s)
Ernesto Velázquez	Men's singles	Abou Alwan (LIB); W 21–3, 21–3	Horvat (SLO); W 21–7, 21–6	Ozturk (TUR); W 21–16, 21–12	Yingping (FRA); L 21–14, 16–21, 17–21	1 Q	Utroša (SLO); L 16–21, 9–21	Did not advance		
Pablo Abián; Ernesto Velázquez	Men's doubles	Mondavio/Battaglino (ITA); W 21–10, 21–14	Hölbling/Đurkinjak (CRO); L 15–21, 13–21	Choueiry/A.Alwan (LIB); W 21–7, 21–5	—N/a	2 Q	Arslan/Oruc (TUR); L 14–21, 16–21	Did not advance		

== Bocce ==
Lyonnaise

Athlete	Event	Elimination		Quarterfinal		Semifinal		Final / BM	
Athlete	Event	Score	Rank	Score	Rank	Score	Rank	Score	Rank
Cristina Soler	Women's precision throw	12	7 Q	3	8	Did not advance			

Pétanque

Athlete	Event	Group stage			Semifinal	Final / BM	
Athlete	Event	Opposition Score	Opposition Score	Rank	Opposition Score	Opposition Score	Rank
Yolanda Matarranz; Inés Lizón	Women's doubles	Turkey (TUR); W 13–2	Serbia (SRB); W 13–0	1 Q	France (FRA); W 13–7	Tunisia (TUN); L 8–13	2nd place, silver medalist(s)

== Boxing ==
Men

Athlete	Event	Round of 16	Quarterfinals	Semifinals	Final	
Athlete	Event	Opposition Result	Opposition Result	Opposition Result	Opposition Result	Rank
José Kelvin de la Nieve	Flyweight	BYE	Konki (FRA); W 3–0	Inanli (TUR); W 3–0	Picardi (ITA); W 2–1	1st place, gold medalist(s)
Jonathan Alonso	Light welterweight	BYE	Tsanikidis (GRE); L 0–2	Did not advance		
Youba Sissocko	Welterweight	BYE	Al Nabouche (LIB); W 3–0	Meskini (TUN); W 3–0	Abbadi (ALG); L 0–3	2nd place, silver medalist(s)

== Canoeing ==
Men

Athlete	Event	Heats		Semifinals		Final	
Athlete	Event	Time	Rank	Time	Rank	Time	Rank
Saúl Craviotto	K-1 200 m	43.345	3 Q	BYE		36.024	3rd place, bronze medalist(s)
Francisco Cubelos	K-1 1000 m	3:58.676	1 Q	BYE		3:31.426	1st place, gold medalist(s)
Saúl Craviotto; Carlos Pérez	K-2 200 m	—N/a				32.751	1st place, gold medalist(s)
Diego Cosgaya; Emilio Llamedo	K-2 1000 m	—N/a				3:25.692	3rd place, bronze medalist(s)

Women

Athlete	Event	Heats		Semifinals		Final	
Athlete	Event	Time	Rank	Time	Rank	Time	Rank
Ainara Portela	K-1 200 m	—N/a				42.633	4
Isabel María Contreras	K-1 500 m	—N/a				1:55.603	4

Legend: FA = Qualify to final (medal); FB = Qualify to final B (non-medal)

== Cycling ==
Athlete	Event	Time	Rank
Carlos Barbero	Men's road race	3h.20:11	6
Vicente García	Men's road race	3h.20:11	15
Fernando Grijalba	Men's road race	3h.23:39	43
Marcos Jurado	Men's road race	3h.23:39	44
Luis Guillermo Mas Bonet	Men's road race	3h.23:39	42
Marcos Jurado	Men's time trial	35:15.05	11
Luis Guillermo Mas Bonet	Men's time trial	32:58.28	2nd place, silver medalist(s)

== Fencing ==
Men

Athlete	Event	Group stage					Round of 16	Quarterfinal	Semifinal	Final / BM	
Athlete	Event	Opposition Score	Opposition Score	Opposition Score	Opposition Score	Rank	Opposition Score	Opposition Score	Opposition Score	Opposition Score	Rank
José Luis Abajo	Individual épée	Karadeniz (TUR); W 5–3	Buhdeima (LBA); L 4–5	Petrovski (MKD); W 5–1	Fayez (EGY); W 5–0	2 Q	Nikolic (SRB); W 15–6	Fayez (EGY); W 15–11	Khder (EGY); L 14–15	Did not dispute	3rd place, bronze medalist(s)
Yulen Pereira	Individual épée	Michon (LIB); L 2–5	Garozzo (ITA); L 1–5	Lucenay (FRA); L 3–5	Nikolic (SRB); W 5–0	4 Q	Khder (EGY); L 13–15	Did not advance			
Fernando Casares	Individual sabre	Apithy (FRA); W 5–2	Berrè (ITA); W 5–0	Tsouroutas (GRE); W 5–0	Firat (TUR); L 3–5	2 Q	—N/a	Ant (TUR); W 15–12	Anstett (FRA); L 6–15	Did not dispute	3rd place, bronze medalist(s)

Women

Athlete	Event	Group stage					Round of 16	Quarterfinal	Semifinal	Final / BM	
Athlete	Event	Opposition Score	Opposition Score	Opposition Score	Opposition Score	Rank	Opposition Score	Opposition Score	Opposition Score	Opposition Score	Rank
Sandra Marcos	Individual sabre	Stagni (ITA); L 3–5	Sarban (TUR); L 3–5	Besbes (TUN); L 3–5	Paizi (GRE); W 5–3	4 Q	Sarban (TUR); W 15–13	Besbes (TUN); L 7–15	Did not advance		
Araceli Navarro	Individual sabre	Gregorio (ITA); L 1–5	Vougiouka (GRE); W 5–4	Kravchuk (TUR); L 2–5	Boudiaf (FRA); W 5–4	3 Q	Kravchuk (TUR); W 15–6	Vougiouka (GRE); L 10–15	Did not advance		

== Gymnastics ==
=== Artistic ===
Men
Team

Athlete	Event	Final							
Athlete	Event	Apparatus						Total	Rank
Athlete	Event	F	PH	R	V	PB	HB	Total	Rank
Néstor Abad	Team	14.433 Q	13.400	—N/a	14.966 Q	—N/a	14.400 Q	57.199	29
Christian Bazán	Team	14.333	—N/a	14.333	13.700	13.933	—N/a	56.299	30
Javier Gómez Fuertes	Team	14.300	13.900 Q	14.600 Q	14.066	15.233	14.333 Q	86.432	2 Q
Fabián González	Team	14.766 Q	14.700 Q	13.666	14.900 Q	14.733	14.166	86.931	1 Q
Rubén López	Team	—N/a	13.633	14.900 Q	—N/a	14.800 Q	14.200	57.533	28
Total	Team	43.532	42.233	43.833	43.932	44.766	42.933	261.229	1st place, gold medalist(s)

Individual

Athlete	Event	Final							
Athlete	Event	Apparatus						Total	Rank
Athlete	Event	F	PH	R	V	PB	HB	Total	Rank
Javier Gómez Fuertes	All-around	14.766	13.466	14.633	14.900	14.533	14.666	86.964	1st place, gold medalist(s)
Fabián González	All-around	14.933	14.233	13.400	15.233	14.766	14.000	86.565	2nd place, silver medalist(s)

Apparatus

Athlete	Event	Total	Rank
Néstor Abad	Floor	14.166	6
Fabián González	Floor	14.733	2nd place, silver medalist(s)
Javier Gómez Fuertes	Rings	14.866	3rd place, bronze medalist(s)
Rubén López	Rings	14.833	4
Javier Gómez Fuertes	Pommel Horse	12.600	8
Fabián González	Pommel Horse	14.833	3rd place, bronze medalist(s)
Néstor Abad	Vault	14.833	1st place, gold medalist(s)
Fabián González	Vault	14.033	4
Rubén López	Parallel Bars	15.000	2nd place, silver medalist(s)
Néstor Abad	Horizontal Bar	14.500	5
Javier Gómez Fuertes	Horizontal Bar	14.200	7

Women

Athlete	Event	Qualification						Final					
Athlete	Event	Apparatus				Total	Rank	Apparatus				Total	Rank
Athlete	Event	V	UB	BB	F	Total	Rank	V	UB	BB	F	Total	Rank
Roxana Daniela Popa	All-around	15.033	13.033 Q	11.766	13.333	53.165	5 Q	DNS					
María Paula Vargas	All-around	13.933	13.866 Q	12.200 Q	13.066 Q	53.065	6 Q	14.233	13.600	13.633	13.566	55.032	2nd place, silver medalist(s)

Apparatus

Athlete	Event	Total	Rank
María Paula Vargas	Floor	12.433	6
Roxana Daniela Popa	Uneven Bars	13.300	5
María Paula Vargas	Uneven Bars	14.100	2nd place, silver medalist(s)
María Paula Vargas	Balance Beam	12.066	6

=== Rhythmic ===
Athlete	Event	Qualification						Final					
Athlete	Event	Hoop	Ball	Clubs	Ribbon	Total	Rank	Hoop	Ball	Clubs	Ribbon	Total	Rank
Natalia García	All-around	17.017	16.983	16.833	16.950	67.783	5 Q	16.500	16.733	16.433	16.483	66.149	6
Carolina Rodríguez	All-around	17.383	17.567	17.517	17.033	69.500	1 Q	17.417	17.400	17.600	17.550	69.967	1st place, gold medalist(s)

== Handball ==
=== Women's tournament ===
Team

- Vanessa Amorós
- Alexandrina Barbosa
- Nuria Benzal
- Raquel Caño
- Elisabet Chávez
- Naiara Egozkue
- Patricia Elorza
- Beatriz Escribano
- Cristina González
- Lara González
- Mireya González
- Ainhoa Hernández
- Marta López
- Ana Isabel Martínez
- María Muñoz
- Haridian Rodríguez

=== Group B ===
Team	Pld	W	D	L	GF	GA	GD	Pts
Slovenia	4	3	1	0	118	98	+20	7
Croatia	4	2	1	1	108	116	−8	5
Spain	4	2	0	2	93	80	+13	4
Tunisia	4	2	0	2	117	108	+9	4
North Macedonia	4	0	0	4	82	116	−34	0

June 23, 2013; 13:30	Croatia	25 – 24	Spain	Yüreğir Serinevler Arena, Adana

June 24, 2013; 15:00	Spain	17 – 20	Slovenia	Yüreğir Serinevler Arena, Adana

June 25, 2013; 10:00	Tunisia	22 – 28	Spain	Yüreğir Serinevler Arena, Adana

June 26, 2013; 17:00	Spain	24 – 13	North Macedonia	Yüreğir Serinevler Arena, Adana

=== 5th-6th place ===
June 28, 2013; 13:00	Spain	29 – 23	Turkey	Yüreğir Serinevler Arena, Adana

== Judo ==
Men

Athlete	Event	Round of 16	Quarterfinals	Semifinals	Repechage	Final / BM	
Athlete	Event	Opposition Result	Opposition Result	Opposition Result	Opposition Result	Opposition Result	Rank
Sugoi Uriarte	−66 kg	BYE	Gušić (MNE); W 100–000	Mohamedi (ALG); W 110–000	BYE	Jereb (SLO); W 001–000	1st place, gold medalist(s)
Adrián Nacimiento	−81 kg	Abdelaal (EGY); L 000–001	Did not advance				
Alejandro San Martín	−100 kg	Yazıcı (TUR); L 000–121	Did not advance				
Ángel Parra	+100 kg	BYE	Elshehaby (EGY); L 000–100	BYE	Malki (MAR); W 001–000	Jaballah (TUN); L 000–010	5

Women

Athlete	Event	Round of 16	Quarterfinals	Semifinals	Repechage	Final / BM	
Athlete	Event	Opposition Result	Opposition Result	Opposition Result	Opposition Result	Opposition Result	Rank
Laura Gómez	−52 kg	BYE	Delsalle (FRA); W 101–000	Arca (TUR); W 110–000	BYE	Nareks (SLO); W 010–000	1st place, gold medalist(s)
María Bernabéu	−70 kg	BYE	Saidi (ALG); W 100–000	Miled (TUN); W 001–000	BYE	Posvite (FRA); L 000–100	2nd place, silver medalist(s)
Sara Álvarez	+78 kg	BYE	Asselah (ALG); L 001–120	BYE	—N/a	Kaya (TUR); L 000–100	5

== Karate ==
Men

Athlete	Event	Round of 16	Quarterfinals	Semifinals	Repechage	Final / BM	
Athlete	Event	Opposition Result	Opposition Result	Opposition Result	Opposition Result	Opposition Result	Rank
Matías Gómez	−60 kg	—N/a	Benrouida (MAR); L 0–3	Did not advance			
Manuel Rasero	−67 kg	Hasnaoui (TUN); L 2–3	Did not advance				
Fernando Moreno	−75 kg	Petreski (MKD); W 1–0	Solyman (EGY); W 2–1	Da Costa (FRA); W 3–1	—N/a	Yağcı (TUR); L 1–7	2nd place, silver medalist(s)
Jagoba Vizuete	+84 kg	Omar (LBA); W 3–0	Maniscalco (ITA); L 1–3	Did not advance	Cecunjanin (MNE); L 1–3	Did not advance	

Women

Athlete	Event	Round of 16	Quarterfinals	Semifinals	Repechage	Final / BM	
Athlete	Event	Opposition Result	Opposition Result	Opposition Result	Opposition Result	Opposition Result	Rank
Marta Armentia	−55 kg	—N/a	Kovačević (CRO); W 3–1	Yenen (TUR); L 0–1	—N/a	Issa (LBA); W 8–0	3rd place, bronze medalist(s)
Irene Colomar	−68 kg	Abdelkader (ALG); W 8–0	Spitzer (AND); W 5–0	Saleš (CRO); W w/o	—N/a	Burucu (TUR); L 1–5	2nd place, silver medalist(s)
Laura Palacio	+68 kg	Chatziliadou (GRE); W 7–2	Čelan (CRO); W 2–1	Hocaoglu (TUR); L 0–1	—N/a	Vitelli (ITA); L 0–3	4

== Rowing ==
Men

Athlete	Event	Heats		Repechage		Final	
Athlete	Event	Time	Rank	Time	Rank	Time	Rank
Alexander Sigurbjornsson; Pau Vela	Pair	6:38.16	3 Q	—N/a		6:37.38	3rd place, bronze medalist(s)
Jaime de Haz; Ander Zabala	Lightweight double sculls	6:34.97	2 Q	6:29.90	2 Q	6:38.78	4

== Sailing ==
Men

Athlete	Event	Race											Net points	Final rank
Athlete	Event	1	2	3	4	5	6	7	8	9	10	M*	Net points	Final rank
Jesus Rogel	Laser												46	3rd place, bronze medalist(s)

Women

Athlete	Event	Race											Net points	Final rank
Athlete	Event	1	2	3	4	5	6	7	8	9	10	M*	Net points	Final rank
Alicia Cebrián	Laser Radial												29	2nd place, silver medalist(s)

== Shooting ==
Men

Athlete	Event	Qualification		Final	
Athlete	Event	Points	Rank	Points	Rank
Juan José Aramburu	Skeet	123	2 Q	13	6
Antonio Jesús Bailón	Trap	119	12	Did not advance	
Pablo Carrera	10 m air pistol	582	1 Q	199,3	1st place, gold medalist(s)
Pablo Carrera	50 m pistol	563	1 Q	172,0	3rd place, bronze medalist(s)
Javier López	10 m air rifle	611,1	12	Did not advance	
Javier López	50 m rifle 3 positions	1141	9	Did not advance	
Javier López	50 m rifle prone	609,4	11	Did not advance	
Jesús Serrano	Trap	123	5	Did not advance	

Women

Athlete	Event	Qualification		Final	
Athlete	Event	Points	Rank	Points	Rank
Sonia Franquet	10 m air pistol	382	4 Q	156,3	4
Sonia Franquet	25 m pistol	584	1 Q	3	8
Fátima Gálvez	Trap	74	1 Q	25	2nd place, silver medalist(s)
Nuria Vega	10 m air rifle	408,1	9	Did not advance	

== Swimming ==
Men

Athlete	Event	Heat		Final	
Athlete	Event	Time	Rank	Time	Rank
Markel Alberdi	50 m freestyle	23.17	4	Did not advance	
Aitor Martínez	50 m freestyle	23.33	3	Did not advance	
Aitor Martínez	100 m freestyle	51.59	3	Did not advance	
David Levecq	100 m freestyle S10	58.87	1 Q	55.98	1st place, gold medalist(s)
José Antonio Mari	100 m freestyle S10	58.41	1 Q	57.67	3rd place, bronze medalist(s)
Gerard Rodríguez	200 m freestyle	1:54.62	5	Did not advance	
Antonio Arroyo	400 m freestyle	3:59.07	5	Did not advance	
Gerard Rodríguez	400 m freestyle	4:07.63	6	Did not advance	
Antonio Arroyo	1500 m freestyle	—N/a		15:34.42	6
Óscar Pereiro	50 m backstroke	25.51	1 Q	25.76	4
Juan Francisco Segura	50 m backstroke	25.86	2 Q	25.66	3rd place, bronze medalist(s)
Óscar Pereiro	100 m backstroke	58.91	4	Did not advance	
Juan Francisco Segura	100 m backstroke	56.29	1 Q	55.57	3rd place, bronze medalist(s)
Alejandro García	200 m backstroke	2:08.26	2 Q	2:06.34	5
Héctor Monteagudo	50 m breaststroke	28.52	3 Q	28.38	7
Héctor Monteagudo	100 m breaststroke	1:04.38	10	Did not advance	
José Manuel Valdivia	50 m butterfly	23.96	1 Q	23.92	3rd place, bronze medalist(s)
José Manuel Valdivia	100 m butterfly	54.16	3 Q	54.26	7
Carlos Peralta	200 m butterfly	1:59.89	2 Q	1:59.09	4
Alejandro García	200 m individual medley	2:06.21	7 Q	2:07.23	7
Alejandro García	400 m individual medley	4:34.12	5	Did not advance	
Markel Alberdi; Aitor Martínez; Óscar Pereiro; Juan Francisco Segura	4 × 100 m freestyle relay	3:25.40	3 Q	3:20.82	4
Juan Francisco Segura; José Manuel Valdivia; Carlos Peralta; Gerard Rodríguez	4 × 200 m freestyle relay	7:41.68	4 Q	7:30.96	5
Juan Francisco Segura; Héctor Monteagudo; José Manuel Valdivia; Aitor Martínez	4 × 100 m medley relay	3:48.99	3 Q	3:42.18	5

Women

Athlete	Event	Heat		Final	
Athlete	Event	Time	Rank	Time	Rank
Marta González	50 m freestyle	26.62	4	Did not advance	
Lidón Muñoz	100 m freestyle	56.93	3 Q	56.43	6
Marta González	100 m freestyle	56.63	1 Q	56.15	4
Sarai Gascón	100 m freestyle S10	1:08.94	2 Q	1:03.94	1st place, gold medalist(s)
Esther Morales Fernández	100 m freestyle S10	1:08.48	1 Q	1:05.50	2nd place, silver medalist(s)
Catalina Corró	200 m freestyle	2:05.23	3 Q	2:03.65	6
Marta González	200 m freestyle	2:04.34	2 Q	2:03.09	5
Claudia Dasca	400 m freestyle	4:18.29	4 Q	4:12.41	3rd place, bronze medalist(s)
María Vilas	400 m freestyle	4:16.81	3 Q	4:17.36	5
Claudia Dasca	800 m freestyle	—N/a		8:45.41	3rd place, bronze medalist(s)
María Vilas	800 m freestyle	—N/a		8:52.05	6
Lidón Muñoz	50 m backstroke	29.81	8 Q	29.66	7
Lidón Muñoz	100 m backstroke	1:03.47	3 Q	1:02.95	5
Natalia Torné	100 m backstroke	1:04.74	4	Did not advance	
Lidón Muñoz	200 m backstroke	2:18.92	4 Q	2:16.43	5
Natalia Torné	200 m backstroke	2:16.16	3 Q	2:15.12	4
Jessica Vall	50 m breaststroke	32.65	2 Q	32.46	5
Jessica Vall	100 m breaststroke	1:09.81	2 Q	1:08.80	2nd place, silver medalist(s)
Jessica Vall	200 m breaststroke	2:31.20	2 Q	2:27.22	1st place, gold medalist(s)
Carla Campo	50 m butterfly	28.28	5	Did not advance	
Carla Campo	100 m butterfly	1:01.61	3 Q	1:01.26	6
Carla Campo	200 m butterfly	2:15.39	2 Q	2:14.11	4
Catalina Corró	200 m individual medley	2:18.72	2 Q	2:17.68	6
Claudia Dasca	400 m individual medley	4:53.17	2 Q	4:46.64	3rd place, bronze medalist(s)
María Vilas	400 m individual medley	4:50.81	2 Q	4:44.58	2nd place, silver medalist(s)
Marta González; Lidón Muñoz; Catalina Corró; Jessica Vall	4 × 100 m freestyle relay	3:51.07	3 Q	3:49.24	4
Lidón Muñoz; Claudia Dasca; Catalina Corró; Marta González	4 × 200 m freestyle relay	8:24.48	2 Q	8:12.55	2nd place, silver medalist(s)
Lidón Muñoz; Jessica Vall; Carla Campo; Marta González	4 × 100 m medley relay	4:18.01	2 Q	4:08.84	2nd place, silver medalist(s)

== Table tennis ==
Men

Athlete	Event	Round Robin 1				Round Robin 2				Quarterfinal	Semifinal	Final / BM	
Athlete	Event	Opposition Score	Opposition Score	Opposition Score	Rank	Opposition Score	Opposition Score	Opposition Score	Rank	Opposition Score	Opposition Score	Opposition Score	Rank
He Zhi Wen	Singles	Alhneaish (LIB); W 4–0	Yiangou (CYP); W 4–0	—N/a	1 Q	Lumbroso (TUN); W 4–1	Li (TUR); W 4–3	Stoyanov (ITA); W 4–3	1 Q	Jevtović (SRB); W 4–1	Vang (TUR); L 1–4	Li (TUR); L 0–4	4
Carlos Machado	Singles	Stanojkovski (MKD); W 4–0	Pete (SRB); W 4–1	—N/a	1 Q	Jevtović (SRB); W 4–0	Mattenet (FRA); W 4–2	Yiangou (CYP); W 4–3	1 Q	Li (TUR); L 0–4	Did not advance		
He Zhi Wen; Carlos Machado	Team	Stanojkovski/ Tomoski (MKD); W 3–0	Bobocica/ Stoyanov (ITA); W 3–2	Alhneaish/ Moumjoghlian (LIB); W 3–0	1 Q	—N/a				Gauzi/ Mattenet (FRA); W 3–2	Li/ Vang (TUR); L 2–3	Jevtović/ Pete (SRB); W 3–1	3rd place, bronze medalist(s)

Women

Athlete	Event	Round Robin				Quarterfinal	Semifinal	Final / BM	
Athlete	Event	Opposition Score	Opposition Score	Opposition Score	Rank	Opposition Score	Opposition Score	Opposition Score	Rank
Sara Ramírez	Singles	Osmenaj (ALB); W 4–0	Papadaki (GRE); W 4–0	Bsaibes (LIB); W 4–0	1 Q	Stefanova (ITA); W 4–1	Li (FRA); W 4–1	Hu (TUR); L 3–4	2nd place, silver medalist(s)
Shen Yanfei	Singles	Toliou (GRE); W 4–0	Eldawlatly (EGY); W 4–0	—N/a	1 Q	Xian (FRA); W 4–0	Hu (TUR); L 1–4	Li (FRA); W 4–0	3rd place, bronze medalist(s)
Sara Ramírez; Shen Yanfei	Team	Fajmut/Tomazini (SLO); W 3–0	Meshref/Eldawlatly (EGY); W 3–0	Hajj/Bsaibes (LIB); W 3–0	1 Q	—N/a	Vivarelli/Stefanova (ITA); W 3–0	Li/Xian (FRA); W 3–1	1st place, gold medalist(s)

== Taekwondo ==
Men

Athlete	Event	Round of 16	Quarterfinals	Semifinals	Final / BM	
Athlete	Event	Opposition Result	Opposition Result	Opposition Result	Opposition Result	Rank
José Luis Méndez	−58 kg	BYE	Guennouni (MAR); W 6–3	Pozan (TUR); W 5–2	Furet (FRA); W 9–6	1st place, gold medalist(s)
Daniel Quesada	−68 kg	BYE	Papadopo (GRE); W 8–2	Tazegül (TUR); W 12–7	Treviso (ITA); W 6–2	1st place, gold medalist(s)
Nicolás García	−80 kg	BYE	Gredić (BIH); W 10–5	Oueslati (TUN); L 1–2	Did not dispute	3rd place, bronze medalist(s)
Mikel Bernal	+80 kg	El Hainouni (MAR); W 5–4	Sari (TUR); L 8–14	Did not advance		

Women

Athlete	Event	Round of 16	Quarterfinals	Semifinals	Final / BM	
Athlete	Event	Opposition Result	Opposition Result	Opposition Result	Opposition Result	Rank
Paula Benes	−49 kg	Koutsou (GRE); W 4–3	Yildirim (TUR); L 3–4	Did not advance		
Eva Calvo	−57 kg	BYE	Liborio (FRA); W 2–1	Bekkali (MAR); W 5–0	Ilgun (TUR); W 2–1	1st place, gold medalist(s)
Rosana Simón	+67 kg	BYE		Mellier (FRA); L 4–5	Did not dispute	3rd place, bronze medalist(s)

== Tennis ==
Men

Athlete	Event	Round of 16	Quarterfinals	Semifinals	Final / BM	
Athlete	Event	Opposition Score	Opposition Score	Opposition Score	Opposition Score	Rank
Albert Alcaraz	Singles	Cecchinato (ITA); W 6–4, 7–5	Jaziri (TUN); L 6–3, 6–7(8), 1–6	Did not advance		
David Pérez	Singles	Kolovelonis (GRE); L 1–6, 3–6	Did not advance			
Albert Alcaraz; David Pérez	Doubles	BYE	Al-Mabrok/Al-Houni (LBA); W 6–1, 6–0	Rola/Ternar (SLO); L 3–6, 6–2, [8–10]	Akkoyun/İlhan (TUR); W 6–2, 6–3	3rd place, bronze medalist(s)

Women

Athlete	Event	Round of 16	Quarterfinals	Semifinals	Final / BM	
Athlete	Event	Opposition Score	Opposition Score	Opposition Score	Opposition Score	Rank
Andrea Lázaro García	Singles	Papamichail (GRE); L 7–6(9), 6–7(5), 2–6	Did not advance			
Sara Sorribes	Singles	Marc (SLO); W 6–0, 6–3	Jabeur (TUN); W 6–4, 6–3	Di Sarra (ITA); W 6–2, 6–4	Büyükakçay (TUR); L 1–6, 3–6	2nd place, silver medalist(s)
Andrea Lázaro García; Sara Sorribes	Doubles	BYE	Papamichail/Sakkari (GRE); W 6–2, 6–4	Di Sarra/Grymalska (ITA); L 4–6, 1–6	Abbès/Jabeur (TUN); L 4–6, 6–4, [1–10]	4

== Volleyball ==
=== Beach ===
Men

Athlete	Event	Preliminary round		Standing	Quarterfinals	Semifinals	Final / BM	
Athlete	Event	Opposition Score	Opposition Score	Standing	Opposition Score	Opposition Score	Opposition Score	Rank
Adrián Gavira; Pablo Herrera	Men's	Dell'Orco/Križanović (CRO); W 21–13, 21–11	Gogtepe/Sahin (TUR); W 21–18, 23–21	1 Q	Cecchini/Ingrosso (ITA); W 21–16, 27–25	Nicolai/Lupo (ITA); W 17–21, 21–18, 15–13	Murat/Selcuk (TUR); L 19–21, 17–21	2nd place, silver medalist(s)

Women

Athlete	Event	Preliminary round		Standing	Quarterfinals	Semifinals	Final / BM	
Athlete	Event	Opposition Score	Opposition Score	Standing	Opposition Score	Opposition Score	Opposition Score	Rank
Cristina Hopf; Alejandra Simón	Women's	Egić/Milošević (SRB); W 21–18, 21–19	Fabjan/Vodeb (SLO); L 24–26, 15–21	2 Q	Cicolari/Menegatti (ITA); L 13–21, 15–21	Did not advance		

== Water polo ==
=== Men's tournament ===
Team

- Iñaki Aguilar
- Ricard Alarcón
- Daniel Cercols
- Rubén de Lera
- Albert Español
- Joel Esteller
- Pere Estrany
- Francisco Fernández
- Xavier García
- Daniel López
- Blai Mallarach
- Guillermo Molina
- Xavier Vallés

=== Group A ===
Team	Pld	W	D	L	GF	GA	GD	Pts
Croatia	2	2	0	0	25	11	+14	4
Spain	2	1	0	1	20	11	+9	2
Turkey	2	0	0	2	7	30	−23	0

June 19, 2013; 19:30	Report	Croatia	8–7	Spain	Çiftlikköy Campus Swimming Pool, Mersin; Referees: Reemnet (NED) and Collantoni (ITA)
June 19, 2013; 19:30	Report	Score by quarters: 3 – 0, 2 – 2, 3 – 1, 0 – 4			Çiftlikköy Campus Swimming Pool, Mersin; Referees: Reemnet (NED) and Collantoni (ITA)
June 19, 2013; 19:30	Report	Obradović 3	Goals	Alarcón, Español 2	Çiftlikköy Campus Swimming Pool, Mersin; Referees: Reemnet (NED) and Collantoni (ITA)

June 21, 2013; 19:30	Turkey	3–13	Spain	Çiftlikköy Campus Swimming Pool, Mersin

=== Semifinals ===
June 23, 2013; 17:15	Spain	10–7	Greece	Çiftlikköy Campus Swimming Pool, Mersin

=== Final ===
June 25, 2013; 18:15	Croatia	11–9	Spain	Çiftlikköy Campus Swimming Pool, Mersin

== Water skiing ==
Men

Athlete	Event	Heat		Final	
Athlete	Event	Points	Rank	Points	Rank
Luis Noguera	Slalom		6	Did not advance	

Women

Athlete	Event	Heat		Final	
Athlete	Event	Points	Rank	Points	Rank
Sandra Botas	Slalom		4 Q		4

== Weightlifting ==
Men

Athlete	Event	Snatch		Clean & jerk	
Athlete	Event	Result	Rank	Result	Rank
Michael Steven Otero	−56 kg	107	3rd place, bronze medalist(s)	—	—
Alejandro González	−77 kg	140	8	180	4
Andrés Mata	−85 kg	—	—	185	6

Women

Athlete	Event	Snatch		Clean & jerk	
Athlete	Event	Result	Rank	Result	Rank
Estefanía Juan	−48 kg	73	4	94	2nd place, silver medalist(s)
Sheila Ramos	−69 kg	95	3rd place, bronze medalist(s)	216	3rd place, bronze medalist(s)
Lydia Valentín	−75 kg	120	1st place, gold medalist(s)	145	1st place, gold medalist(s)

== Wrestling ==
Men's Freestyle

Athlete	Event	Qualification	Round of 16	Quarterfinal	Semifinal	Repechage 1	Repechage 2	Final / BM	
Athlete	Event	Opposition Result	Opposition Result	Opposition Result	Opposition Result	Opposition Result	Opposition Result	Opposition Result	Rank
Juan Pablo González	−55 kg	BYE	Mannino (ITA); W 2–0	El Ouarraqe (FRA); L 1–2	Did not advance	Peker (TUR); L 0–2	Did not advance		
Yunier Castillo	−60 kg	BYE		Mohamed (EGY); L 1–2	Did not advance				
Taimuraz Friev	−84 kg	BYE	Abdelhamid (EGY); L 1–2	Did not advance					

Men's Greco-Roman

Athlete	Event	Qualification	Round of 16	Quarterfinal	Semifinal	Repechage 1	Repechage 2	Final / BM	
Athlete	Event	Opposition Result	Opposition Result	Opposition Result	Opposition Result	Opposition Result	Opposition Result	Opposition Result	Rank
Albert Baghumyan	−60 kg	BYE	Hamed (EGY); L 0–3	Did not advance					
Ismael Navarro	−66 kg	BYE		Etlinger (CRO); L 0–7	Did not advance				
Ricardo Gil	−74 kg	BYE	Ouakali (ALG); L 1–3	Did not advance					

Women's Freestyle

Athlete	Event	Qualification	Round of 16	Quarterfinal	Semifinal	Repechage 1	Repechage 2	Final / BM	
Athlete	Event	Opposition Result	Opposition Result	Opposition Result	Opposition Result	Opposition Result	Opposition Result	Opposition Result	Rank
Karima Sánchez	−59 kg			Did not advance					
Irene García	−63 kg	—N/a		Kolic (FRA); W 3–1	Diana (ITA); L 4–8	BYE		Martinovic (MNE); W 9–0	3rd place, bronze medalist(s)
Aurora Fajardo	−72 kg								3rd place, bronze medalist(s)
