= Swimming at the 2013 Mediterranean Games – Women's 400 metre individual medley =

Women's 400 metre individual medley at the 2013 Mediterranean Games
- Venue: Mersin Olympic Swimming Pool
- Location: Mersin, Turkey
- Dates: 23 June
- Competitors: 12 from 8 nations
- Winning time: 4:40.49

Medalists
gold medal	Anja Klinar	Slovenia
silver medal	María Vilas	Spain
bronze medal	Claudia Dasca Romeu	Spain

The women's 400 metre individual medley competition of the swimming events at the 2013 Mediterranean Games took place on June 23 at the Mersin Olympic Swimming Pool in Mersin, Turkey.

== Schedule ==
All times are Eastern European Summer Time (UTC+03:00)

Date	Time	Event
Sunday, 23 June 2013	10:16	Heats
Sunday, 23 June 2013	19:00	Final

== Records ==
Prior to this competition, the existing world and Mediterranean Games records were as follows:

World record	Ye Shiwen (CHN)	4:28.43	London, United Kingdom	28 July 2012
Mediterranean Games record	Anja Klinar (SLO)	4:39.48	Pescara, Italy	29 June 2009

== Results ==
=== Heats ===
Rank	Heat	Lane	Name	Nationality	Time	Notes
1	1	4	Stefania Pirozzi	Italy	4:48.03	Q
2	2	4	Anja Klinar	Slovenia	4:48.44	Q
3	1	5	María Vilas	Spain	4:50.81	Q
4	1	3	Fantine Lesaffre	France	4:52.72	Q
5	2	5	Claudia Dasca Romeu	Spain	4:53.17	Q
6	2	3	Carlotta Toni	Italy	4:55.35	Q
7	1	6	Afroditi Giareni	Greece	4:57.63	Q
8	2	2	Melisa Akarsu	Turkey	4:59.16	Q
9	2	6	Sarra Lajnef	Tunisia	5:02.64	
10	2	7	Souad Cherouati	Algeria	5:04.24	
11	1	2	Duygu Birol	Turkey	5:09.17	
	1	7	Zeineb Khalfallah	Tunisia	DNS	

=== Final ===
Rank	Lane	Name	Nationality	Time	Notes
1st place, gold medalist(s)	5	Anja Klinar	Slovenia	4:40.49	
2nd place, silver medalist(s)	3	María Vilas	Spain	4:44.58	
3rd place, bronze medalist(s)	2	Claudia Dasca Romeu	Spain	4:46.64	
4	6	Fantine Lesaffre	France	4:47.10	
5	1	Afroditi Giareni	Greece	4:57.62	
6	8	Melisa Akarsu	Turkey	4:57.64	
	4	Stefania Pirozzi	Italy	DQ	
	7	Carlotta Toni	Italy	DQ	
