= Swimming at the 2013 Mediterranean Games =

- Venue: Mersin Olympic Swimming Pool
- Dates: 21-25 June 2013

The swimming competitions at the 2013 Mediterranean Games in Mersin took place between 21 June and 25 June at the Mersin Olympic Swimming Pool.

Athletes competed in 38 events and 2 paralympic events.

== Medal summary ==
=== Men's events ===
Event	Gold	Silver	Bronze
50 m freestyle	Marco Orsi; Italy	Luca Dotto; Italy	Kristian Golomeev; Greece
100 m freestyle	Luca Leonardi; Italy	Kemal Arda Gürdal; Turkey	Luca Dotto; Italy
200 m freestyle	Velimir Stjepanović; Serbia	Oussama Mellouli; Tunisia	Simon Guerin; France
400 m freestyle	Velimir Stjepanović; Serbia	Oussama Mellouli; Tunisia	Simon Guerin; France
1500 m freestyle	Oussama Mellouli; Tunisia	Luca Baggio; Italy	Matteo Furlan; Italy
50 m backstroke	Stefano Mauro Pizzamiglio; Italy	Niccolò Bonacchi; Italy	Juan-Francisco Segura Gutierrez; Spain
100 m backstroke	Matteo Milli; Italy	Benjamin Stasiulis; France	Juan-Francisco Segura Gutierrez; Spain
200 m backstroke	Benjamin Stasiulis; France	Federico Turrini; Italy; Damiano Lestingi; Italy	
50 m breaststroke	Damir Dugonjic; Slovenia	Andrea Toniato; Italy	Čaba Silađi; Serbia
100 m breaststroke	Fabio Scozzoli; Italy	Andrea Toniato; Italy	Panagiotis Samilidis; Greece
200 m breaststroke	Panagiotis Samilidis; Greece	Flavio Bizzarri; Italy	Dimitrios Koulouris; Greece
50 m butterfly	Ivan Lenđer; Serbia	Piero Codia; Italy	Jose Canizares; Spain
100 m butterfly	Ivan Lenđer; Serbia	Matteo Rivolta; Italy	Piero Codia; Italy
200 m butterfly	Velimir Stjepanović; Serbia	Stefanos Dimitriadis; Greece	Francesco Pavone; Italy
200 m individual medley	Federico Turrini; Italy	Oussama Mellouli; Tunisia	Andreas Vazaios; Greece
400 m individual medley	Oussama Mellouli; Tunisia	Federico Turrini; Italy	Taki Mrabet; Tunisia
4 × 100 m freestyle	Italy (ITA); Gianluca Maglia; Marco Orsi; Luca Leonardi; Luca Dotto	Turkey (TUR); Doğa Çelik; İskender Baslakov; Furkan Deniz Maraşlı; Kemal Arda Gürdal	Greece (GRE); Kristian Golomeev; Fotios Koliopoulos; Odysseus Meladinis; Christos Katrantzis
4 × 200 m freestyle	Italy (ITA); Damiano Lestingi; Gianluca Maglia; Federico Turrini; Alex Di Giorgio	France (FRA); Simon Guerin; Eric Ress; Ganesh Pedurand; Benjamin Stasiulis	Turkey (TUR); Kemal Arda Gürdal; Nezir Karap; Furkan Deniz Maraşlı; Doğa Çelik
4 × 100 m medley	Italy (ITA); Matteo Milli; Andrea Toniato; Piero Codia; Gianluca Maglia	Greece (GRE); Andreas Vazaios; Panagiotis Samilidis; Stefanos Dimitriadis; Kristian Golomeev	Turkey (TUR); Güven Duvan; Demir Atasoy; Kaan Türker Ayar; Kemal Arda Gürdal

=== Women's events ===
Event	Gold	Silver	Bronze
50 m freestyle	Anna Santamans; France	Silvia Di Pietro; Italy	Burcu Dolunay; Turkey
100 m freestyle	Theodora Drakou; Greece	Erika Ferraioli; Italy	Silvia Di Pietro; Italy
200 m freestyle	Martina De Memme; Italy	Mojca Sagmeister; Slovenia	Diletta Carli; Italy
400 m freestyle	Martina De Memme; Italy	Anja Klinar; Slovenia	Claudia Dasca; Spain
800 m freestyle	Martina De Memme; Italy	Aurora Ponselé; Italy	Claudia Dasca; Spain
50 m backstroke	Sanja Jovanović; Croatia	Theodora Drakou; Greece	Arianna Barbieri; Italy
100 m backstroke	Elena Gemo; Italy	Theodora Drakou; Greece	Margherita Panziera; Italy
200 m backstroke	Ambra Esposito; Italy	Margherita Panziera; Italy	Halime Zülal Zeren; Turkey
50 m breaststroke	Michela Guzzetti; Italy	Dilara Buse Günaydın; Turkey	Giulia De Ascentis; Italy
100 m breaststroke	Giulia De Ascentis; Italy	Jèssica Vall Montero; Spain	Dilara Buse Günaydın; Turkey
200 m breaststroke	Jèssica Vall Montero; Spain	Elisa Celli; Italy	Dilara Buse Günaydın; Turkey
50 m butterfly	Farida Osman; Egypt	Anna Santamans; France	Silvia Di Pietro; Italy
100 m butterfly	Ilaria Bianchi; Italy	Elena Di Liddo; Italy	Béryl Gastaldello; France
200 m butterfly	Stefania Pirozzi; Italy	Anja Klinar; Slovenia	Emanuela Albenzi; Italy
200 m individual medley	Anja Klinar; Slovenia	Stefania Pirozzi; Italy	Carlotta Toni; Italy
400 m individual medley	Anja Klinar; Slovenia	María Vilas; Spain	Claudia Dasca Romeu; Spain
4 × 100 m freestyle	France (FRA); Anna Santamans; Lauriane Haag; Mathilde Cini; Béryl Gastaldello	Greece (GRE); Stavroula Karantakou; Kristel Vourna; Theodora Giareni; Theodora Drakou	Turkey (TUR); Esra Kübra Kaçmaz; Halime Zülal Zeren; Gizem Bozkurt; Burcu Dolunay
4 × 200 m freestyle	Italy (ITA); Chiara Masini Luccetti; Diletta Carli; Stefania Pirozzi; Martina De Memme	Spain (ESP); Lidon Munoz Del Campo; Claudia Dasca Romeu; Catalina Corro Lorente; Marta Gonzalez Crivillers	Slovenia (SLO); Anja Klinar; Mojca Sagmeister; Spela Bohinc; Tanja Smid
4 × 100 m medley	Italy (ITA); Elena Gemo; Giula De Ascentis; Elena Di Liddo; Silvia Di Pietro	Spain (ESP); Lidon Munoz Del Campo; Jessica Vall Montero; Carla Campo Casajus; Marta Gonzalez Crivillers	France (FRA); Mathilde Cini; Coralie Dobral; Béryl Gastaldello; Anna Santamans

=== Paralympic events ===
Event	Gold	Silver	Bronze
Men's 100 m freestyle S10	David Julián Levecq Vives; Spain	Simone Ciulli; Italy	José Mari Garcia; Spain
Women's 100 m freestyle S10	Sarai Gascón Moreno; Spain	Esther Morales Fernández; Spain	Anaelle Roulet; France

=== Medal table ===
Key:

* Host nation (Turkey)

Rank	Nation	Gold	Silver	Bronze	Total
1	Italy	20	19	12	51
2	Serbia	5	0	1	6
3	Spain	3	5	7	15
4	France	3	3	5	11
5	Slovenia	3	3	1	7
6	Greece	2	5	5	12
7	Tunisia	2	3	1	6
8	Croatia	1	0	0	1
8	Egypt	1	0	0	1
10	Turkey*	0	3	7	10
Totals (10 entries)		40	41	39	120
