= Swimming at the 2013 Mediterranean Games – Men's 50 metre freestyle =

Men's 50 metre freestyle at the 2013 Mediterranean Games
- Venue: Mersin Olympic Swimming Pool
- Location: Mersin, Turkey
- Dates: 22 June
- Competitors: 18 from 12 nations
- Winning time: 22.15

Medalists
gold medal	Marco Orsi	Italy
silver medal	Luca Dotto	Italy
bronze medal	Kristian Golomeev	Greece

The men's 50 metre freestyle competition at the 2013 Mediterranean Games was held on 22 June 2013 at the Mersin Olympic Swimming Pool.

== Schedule ==
All times are Eastern European Summer Time (UTC+03:00)

Date	Time	Event
Saturday, 22 June 2013	9:30	Heats
Saturday, 22 June 2013	18:00	Final

== Records ==
Prior to this competition, the existing world and Mediterranean Games records were as follows:

World record	César Cielo (BRA)	20.91	São Paulo, Brazil	18 December 2009
Mediterranean Games record	Frédérick Bousquet (FRA)	21.17	Pescara, Italy	28 June 2009

== Results ==
=== Heats ===
Rank	Heat	Lane	Name	Nationality	Time	Notes
1	2	4	Marco Orsi	Italy	22.61	Q
2	3	3	Oussama Sahnoune	Algeria	22.65	Q
3	1	4	Kristian Golomeev	Greece	22.67	Q
4	1	6	Doğa Çelik	Turkey	22.71	Q
5	3	4	Luca Dotto	Italy	22.82	Q
6	2	6	Boris Stojanović	Serbia	22.88	Q
7	1	3	Kemal Arda Gürdal	Turkey	22.90	Q
8	1	5	Shehab Younis	Egypt	22.92	Q
9	3	5	Odysseus Meladinis	Greece	23.03	
10	3	6	Markel Alberdi	Spain	23.17	
11	2	5	Aitor Martínez	Spain	23.33	
12	2	2	Velimir Stjepanović	Serbia	23.44	
13	3	2	Adham Abdelmegid	Egypt	23.76	
14	1	2	Omiros Zagkas	Cyprus	23.90	
15	3	7	Mehdi El Hazzaz	Morocco	24.34	
16	2	7	Adam Allouche	Lebanon	24.37	
17	1	7	Donaldo Dervishi	Albania	26.51	
18	3	1	Yousef Abdusalam	Libya	28.25	

=== Final ===
Rank	Lane	Name	Nationality	Time	Notes
1st place, gold medalist(s)	4	Marco Orsi	Italy	22.15	
2nd place, silver medalist(s)	2	Luca Dotto	Italy	22.20	
3rd place, bronze medalist(s)	3	Kristian Golomeev	Greece	22.35	
4	5	Oussama Sahnoune	Algeria	22.71	
5	1	Kemal Arda Gürdal	Turkey	22.82	
6	8	Shehab Younis	Egypt	22.92	
7	6	Doğa Çelik	Turkey	22.94	
8	7	Boris Stojanović	Serbia	23.01	
