= Swimming at the 2013 Mediterranean Games – Women's 100 metre backstroke =

Women's 100 metre backstroke at the 2013 Mediterranean Games
- Venue: Mersin Olympic Swimming Pool
- Location: Mersin, Turkey
- Dates: 24 June
- Competitors: 12 from 7 nations
- Winning time: 1:01.57

Medalists
gold medal	Elena Gemo	Italy
silver medal	Theodora Drakou	Greece
bronze medal	Margherita Panziera	Italy

The women's 100 metre backstroke competition of the swimming events at the 2013 Mediterranean Games took place on June 24 at the Mersin Olympic Swimming Pool in Mersin, Turkey.

== Schedule ==
All times are Eastern European Summer Time (UTC+03:00)

Date	Time	Event
Monday, 24 June 2013	10:00	Heats
Monday, 24 June 2013	18:34	Final

== Records ==
Prior to this competition, the existing world and Mediterranean Games records were as follows:

World record	Gemma Spofforth (GBR)	58.12	Rome, Italy	28 July 2009
Mediterranean Games record	Aspasia Petradaki (GRE)	1:01.72	Pescara, Italy	1 July 2009

== Results ==
=== Heats ===
Rank	Heat	Lane	Name	Nationality	Time	Notes
1	1	4	Margherita Panziera	Italy	1:02.83	Q
2	2	4	Elena Gemo	Italy	1:02.91	Q
3	2	5	Theodora Drakou	Greece	1:03.36	Q
4	2	2	Lidón Muñoz	Spain	1:03.47	Q
5	1	5	Hazal Sarıkaya	Turkey	1:03.48	Q
6	1	3	Aspasia Petradaki	Greece	1:03.68	Q
7	2	7	Halime Zülal Zeren	Turkey	1:04.42	Q
8	2	3	Mathilde Cini	France	1:04.52	Q
9	1	2	Natalia Torné	Spain	1:04.74	
10	1	6	Lucija Kous	Slovenia	1:04.77	
11	2	6	Fantine Lesaffre	France	1:04.92	
11	1	7	Amel Melih	Algeria	1:07.47	

=== Final ===
Rank	Lane	Name	Nationality	Time	Notes
1st place, gold medalist(s)	5	Elena Gemo	Italy	1:01.57	GR
2nd place, silver medalist(s)	3	Theodora Drakou	Greece	1:01.75	
3rd place, bronze medalist(s)	4	Margherita Panziera	Italy	1:01.86	
4	1	Halime Zülal Zeren	Spain	1:02.70	
5	6	Lidón Muñoz	Spain	1:02.95	
6	8	Mathilde Cini	France	1:04.04	
7	7	Aspasia Petradaki	Greece	1:04.15	
8	2	Hazal Sarıkaya	Turkey	1:04.52	
