= Swimming at the 2013 Mediterranean Games – Women's 800 metre freestyle =

Women's 800 metre freestyle at the 2013 Mediterranean Games
- Venue: Mersin Olympic Swimming Pool
- Dates: June 23, 2013
- Competitors: 10 from 7 nations
- Winning time: 8:33.17

Medalists
| gold medal | Martina De Memme | Italy |
| silver medal | Aurora Ponselé | Italy |
| bronze medal | Claudia Dasca | Spain |

The women's 800 metre freestyle competition of the swimming events at the 2013 Mediterranean Games took place on June 24 at the Mersin Olympic Swimming Pool in Mersin, Turkey.

The race consisted of sixteen length of the pool in freestyle.

== Schedule ==
All times are Eastern European Summer Time (UTC+03:00)

| Date | Time | Event |
|---|---|---|
| Sunday, 23 June 2013 | 10:40 | Heat 1 |
| Sunday, 23 June 2013 | 19:30 | Heat 2 |

== Records ==
Prior to this competition, the existing world and Mediterranean Games records were as follows:

| World record | Rebecca Adlington (GBR) | 8:14.10 | Beijing, China | August 16, 2008 |
| Mediterranean Games record | Alessia Filippi (ITA) | 8:20.78 | Pescara, Italy | June 30, 2009 |

== Results ==
All times are in minutes and seconds.

| KEY: | GR | Games record | NR | National record | PB | Personal best | SB | Seasonal best | DNS | Did not started |

=== Final ===
| Rank | Heat | Lane | Athlete | Time | Notes |
|---|---|---|---|---|---|
| 1st place, gold medalist(s) | 2 | 4 | Martina De Memme (ITA) | 8:33.17 | |
| 2nd place, silver medalist(s) | 2 | 5 | Aurora Ponselé (ITA) | 8:40.70 | |
| 3rd place, bronze medalist(s) | 2 | 6 | Claudia Dasca (ESP) | 8:45.41 | |
| 4 | 2 | 1 | Špela Bohinc (SLO) | 8:46.57 | |
| 5 | 2 | 8 | Marianna Lymperta (GRE) | 8:48.21 | |
| 6 | 2 | 2 | María Vilas (ESP) | 8:52.05 | |
| 7 | 2 | 7 | Morgane Rothon (FRA) | 8:53.09 | |
| 8 | 1 | 4 | Merve Eroğlu (TUR) | 9:06.30 | |
| 9 | 1 | 5 | Reem Kaseem (EGY) | 9:10.72 | |
| 10 | 1 | 3 | Zeynep Balto (TUR) | 9:20.27 | |
