= Swimming at the 2013 Mediterranean Games – Women's 200 metre backstroke =

Women's 200 metre backstroke at the 2013 Mediterranean Games
- Venue: Mersin Olympic Swimming Pool
- Location: Mersin, Turkey
- Dates: 22 June
- Competitors: 11 from 7 nations
- Winning time: 2:12.21

Medalists
gold medal	Ambra Esposito	Italy
silver medal	Margherita Panziera	Italy
bronze medal	Halime Zülal Zeren	Turkey

The women's 200 metre backstroke competition of the swimming events at the 2013 Mediterranean Games took place on June 22 at the Mersin Olympic Swimming Pool in Mersin, Turkey.

== Schedule ==
All times are Eastern European Summer Time (UTC+03:00)

Date	Time	Event
Saturday, 22 June 2013	9:46	Heats
Saturday, 22 June 2013	18:22	Final

== Records ==
Prior to this competition, the existing world and Mediterranean Games records were as follows:

World record	Missy Franklin (USA)	2:04.06	London, United Kingdom	3 August 2012
Mediterranean Games record	Alessia Filippi (ITA)	2:08.03	Pescara, Italy	28 June 2009

== Results ==
=== Heats ===
Rank	Heat	Lane	Name	Nationality	Time	Notes
1	1	4	Margherita Panziera	Italy	2:14.75	Q
2	2	4	Ambra Esposito	Italy	2:15.87	Q
3	2	6	Halime Zülal Zeren	Turkey	2:16.14	Q
4	2	5	Natalia Torné	Spain	2:16.16	Q
5	1	3	Afroditi Giareni	Greece	2:17.62	Q
6	1	5	Aspasia Petradaki	Greece	2:18.14	Q
7	1	6	Lidón Muñoz	Spain	2:18.92	Q
8	2	3	Fantine Lesaffre	France	2:20.28	Q
9	2	2	Lucija Kous	Slovenia	2:21.67	
10	1	2	Hania Moro	Egypt	2:24.17	
11	2	7	Gizem Çam	Turkey	2:28.24	

=== Final ===
Rank	Lane	Name	Nationality	Time	Notes
1st place, gold medalist(s)	5	Ambra Esposito	Italy	2:12.21	
2nd place, silver medalist(s)	4	Margherita Panziera	Italy	2:12.86	
3rd place, bronze medalist(s)	3	Halime Zülal Zeren	Turkey	2:14.93	NR
4	6	Natalia Torné	Spain	2:15.12	
5	1	Lidón Muñoz	Spain	2:16.43	
6	8	Fantine Lesaffre	France	2:16.49	
7	2	Afroditi Giareni	Greece	2:17.55	
8	7	Aspasia Petradaki	Greece	2:17.68	
