= Taekwondo at the 2013 Mediterranean Games – Men's 58 kg =

The men's 58 kg competition of the taekwondo events at the 2013 Mediterranean Games took place on the 22 of June at the Edip Buran Arena.

== Schedule ==
All times are Eastern European Summer Time (UTC+3).

Date	Time	Round
June 22, 2013	09:00	Preliminaries
June 22, 2013	14:00	Finals

== Results ==
Legend

- PTG — Won by Points Gap
- SUP — Won by Superiority
- OT — Won on over time (Golden Point)

=== Main bracket ===
Preliminary round
Hady Karam (LIB)	4
Nikolaos Politis (GRE)	12
Egers Aliu (ALB)	5
Marcello Porcaro (ITA)	17

Quarterfinals
Fırat Pozan (TUR)	6
Nikolaos Politis (GRE)	2
Abderrahmane Guennouni (MAR)	3
Jose Luis Mendez (ESP)	6
Yousef Saleh Shriha (LBA)	13
Flavien Furet (FRA)	15
Marcello Porcaro (ITA)	8
Elsaid Nasr (EGY)	3

Semifinals
Fırat Pozan (TUR)	2
Jose Luis Mendez (ESP)	5
Flavien Furet (FRA)	5
Marcello Porcaro (ITA)	4

Gold medal match
Jose Luis Mendez (ESP)	9
Flavien Furet (FRA)	6
