= Swimming at the 2013 Mediterranean Games – Men's 400 metre freestyle =

Men's 400 metre freestyle at the 2013 Mediterranean Games
- Dates: June 21, 2013
- Competitors: 18 from 10 nations

The men's 400 metre freestyle competition of the swimming events at the 2013 Mediterranean Games took place on June 21 at the Mersin Olympic Swimming Pool in Mersin, Turkey. Oussama Mellouli of Tunisia was the defending champion from the 2009 Mediterranean Games.

This race consisted of eight lengths of the pool in freestyle.

== Schedule ==
All times are Eastern European Summer Time (UTC+03:00)

Date	Time	Event
Friday, 21 June 2013	10:35	Heats
Friday, 21 June 2013	18:00	Final

== Records ==
Prior to this competition, the existing world and Mediterranean Games records were as follows:

World record	Paul Biedermann (GER)	3:40.07	Rome, Italy	July 26, 2009
Mediterranean Games record	Oussama Mellouli (TUN)	3:42.71	Pescara, Italy	June 27, 2009

== Results ==
=== Heats ===
Rank	Heat	Lane	Name	Nationality	Time	Notes
1	1	4	Ahmed Mathlouthi	Tunisia	3:53.81	Q
2	2	5	Velimir Stjepanović	Serbia	3:54.97	Q
3	1	3	Marwan Elkamash	Egypt	3:55.18	Q
4	1	6	Simon Guerin	France	3:55.37	Q
5	3	6	Adonios Fokaidis	Greece	3:55.48	Q
6	2	6	Nezir Karap	Turkey	3:55.51	Q
7	3	4	Oussama Mellouli	Tunisia	3:55.81	Q
8	3	5	Alex Di Giorgio	Italy	3:55.82	Q
9	3	2	Ahmed Akram	Egypt	3:56.55	
10	2	4	Samuel Pizzetti	Italy	3:56.56	
11	2	3	Martin Bau	Slovenia	3:57.63	
12	3	3	Lucas Vigoretto	France	3:58.19	
13	1	2	Ediz Yıldırımer	Turkey	3:58.29	
14	1	5	Stefan Šorak	Serbia	3:58.43	
15	2	2	Antonio Arroyo	Spain	3:59.07	
16	1	7	Marko Blaževski	Macedonia	4:00.53	
17	3	7	Jan Karel Petric	Slovenia	4:05.82	
18	2	7	Gerard Rodríguez	Spain	4:07.63	
