= Swimming at the 2013 Mediterranean Games – Men's 1500 metre freestyle =

Men's 1500 metre freestyle at the 2013 Mediterranean Games
- Venue: Mersin Olympic Swimming Pool
- Dates: June 24, 2013
- Competitors: 10 from 8 nations
- Winning time: 15:12.36

Medalists
| gold medal | Oussama Mellouli | Tunisia |
| silver medal | Luca Baggio | Italy |
| bronze medal | Matteo Furlan | Italy |

The men's 1500 metre freestyle competition of the swimming events at the 2013 Mediterranean Games took place on June 24 at the Mersin Olympic Swimming Pool in Mersin, Turkey.

The race consisted of thirty length of the pool in freestyle.

== Schedule ==
All times are Eastern European Summer Time (UTC+03:00)

| Date | Time | Event |
|---|---|---|
| Monday, 24 June 2013 | 10:10 | Heat 1 |
| Monday, 24 June 2013 | 18:56 | Heat 2 |

== Records ==
Prior to this competition, the existing world and Mediterranean Games records were as follows:

| World record | Sun Yang (CHN) | 14:31.02 | London, United Kingdom | August 4, 2012 |
| Mediterranean Games record | Oussama Mellouli (TUN) | 14:38.01 | Pescara, Italy | July 1, 2009 |

== Results ==
All times are in minutes and seconds.

| KEY: | GR | Games record | NR | National record | PB | Personal best | SB | Seasonal best | DNS | Did not started |

=== Final ===
| Rank | Heat | Lane | Athlete | Time | Notes |
|---|---|---|---|---|---|
| 1st place, gold medalist(s) | 2 | 4 | Oussama Mellouli (TUN) | 15:12.36 | |
| 2nd place, silver medalist(s) | 2 | 5 | Luca Baggio (ITA) | 15:15.16 | |
| 3rd place, bronze medalist(s) | 2 | 1 | Matteo Furlan (ITA) | 15:21.19 | |
| 4 | 2 | 3 | Ahmed Akram (EGY) | 15:28.92 | |
| 5 | 1 | 4 | Adonios Fokaidis (GRE) | 15:30.49 | |
| 6 | 2 | 7 | Ediz Yıldırımer (TUR) | 15:31.09 | |
| 7 | 2 | 6 | Antonio Arroyo (ESP) | 15:34.42 | |
| 8 | 2 | 2 | Lucas Vigoretto (FRA) | 15:46.01 | |
| 9 | 1 | 3 | Martin Bau (SLO) | 15:55.19 | |
| | 1 | 5 | Nezir Karap (TUR) | DNS | |
