= Swimming at the 2013 Mediterranean Games – Women's 400 metre freestyle =

Women's 400 metre freestyle at the 2013 Mediterranean Games
- Dates: June 21, 2013
- Competitors: 13 from 8 nations
- Winning time: 4:09.18

Medalists
| gold medal | Martina De Memme | Italy |
| silver medal | Anja Klinar | Slovenia |
| bronze medal | Claudia Dasca | Spain |

The women's 400 metre freestyle competition of the swimming events at the 2013 Mediterranean Games took place on June 21 at the Mersin Olympic Swimming Pool in Mersin, Turkey.

This race consisted of eight lengths of the pool in freestyle.

== Records ==
Prior to this competition, the existing world and Mediterranean Games records were as follows:

| World record | Federica Pellegrini (ITA) | 3:59.15 | Rome, Italy | July 26, 2009 |
| Mediterranean Games record | Federica Pellegrini (ITA) | 4:00.41 | Pescara, Italy | June 27, 2009 |

== Results ==
All times are in minutes and seconds.

| KEY: | q | Fastest non-qualifiers | Q | Qualified | GR | Games record | NR | National record | PB | Personal best | SB | Seasonal best |

=== Heats ===
| Rank | Heat | Lane | Athlete | Time | Notes |
|---|---|---|---|---|---|
| 1 | 2 | 4 | Martina De Memme (ITA) | 4:14.36 | Q |
| 2 | 1 | 4 | Anja Klinar (SLO) | 4:16.40 | Q |
| 3 | 1 | 3 | María Vilas (ESP) | 4:16.81 | Q |
| 4 | 1 | 5 | Claudia Dasca (ESP) | 4:18.29 | Q |
| 5 | 2 | 5 | Chiara Masini Luccetti (ITA) | 4:20.06 | Q |
| 6 | 2 | 6 | Merve Eroglu (TUR) | 4:21.20 | Q |
| 7 | 2 | 3 | Katya Bachrouche (LIB) | 4:21.66 | Q |
| 8 | 1 | 2 | Theodora Giareni (GRE) | 4:22.83 | Q |
| 9 | 2 | 2 | Marianna Lymperta (GRE) | 4:23.19 | |
| 10 | 1 | 7 | Hania Moro (EGY) | 4:25.67 | |
| 11 | 1 | 2 | Reem Kaseem (EGY) | 4:28.60 | |
| 11 | 2 | 7 | Halime Zulal Zeren (TUR) | 4:30.21 | |
| 12 | 2 | 1 | Noel Borshi (ALB) | 4:36.14 | |

=== Final ===
| Rank | Lane | Athlete | Time | Notes |
|---|---|---|---|---|
| 1st place, gold medalist(s) | 4 | Martina De Memme (ITA) | 4:09.18 | |
| 2nd place, silver medalist(s) | 5 | Anja Klinar (SLO) | 4:11.61 | |
| 3rd place, bronze medalist(s) | 6 | Claudia Dasca (ESP) | 4:12.41 | |
| 4 | 2 | Chiara Masini Luccetti (ITA) | 4:16.03 | |
| 5 | 3 | María Vilas (ESP) | 4:17.36 | |
| 6 | 1 | Katya Bachrouche (LIB) | 4:22.38 | |
| 7 | 8 | Theodora Giareni (GRE) | 4:22.73 | |
| 8 | 7 | Merve Eroglu (TUR) | 4:25.31 | |
