= Swimming at the 2013 Mediterranean Games – Women's 100 metre breaststroke =

Women's 100 metre breaststroke at the 2013 Mediterranean Games
- Dates: June 21, 2013
- Competitors: 14 from 9 nations
- Winning time: 1:08.57

Medalists
gold medal	Giulia De Ascentis	Italy
silver medal	Jessica Vall	Spain
bronze medal	Dilara Buse Gunaydin	Turkey

The women's 100 metre breaststroke competition of the swimming events at the 2013 Mediterranean Games took place on June 21 at the Mersin Olympic Swimming Pool in Mersin, Turkey.

The race consisted of two lengths of the pool in breaststroke.

== Records ==
Prior to this competition, the existing world and Mediterranean Games records were as follows:

World record	Jessica Hardy (USA)	1:04.45	Federal Way, United States	August 7, 2009
Mediterranean Games record	Roberta Panara (ITA)	1:08.47	Pescara, Italy	June 27, 2009

== Results ==
All times are in minutes and seconds.

KEY:	q	Fastest non-qualifiers	Q	Qualified	GR	Games record	NR	National record	PB	Personal best	SB	Seasonal best

=== Heats ===
Rank	Heat	Lane	Athlete	Time	Notes
1	1	5	Dilara Buse Gunaydin (TUR)	1:09.21	Q
2	2	2	Jessica Vall (ESP)	1:09.81	Q
3	2	5	Giulia De Ascentis (ITA)	1:10.17	Q
4	1	6	Coralie Dobral (FRA)	1:10.43	Q
5	2	6	Maria Georgia Michalaka (GRE)	1:10.94	Q
6	2	3	Tjaša Vozel (SLO)	1:11.00	Q
7	2	4	Michela Guzzetti (ITA)	1:11.18	Q
8	2	7	Fanny Deberghes (FRA)	1:12.06	Q
9	1	3	Tanja Šmid (SLO)	1:12.34	
10	1	7	Mai Mostafa (EGY)	1:12.73	
11	1	1	Melisa Emirbayer (TUR)	1:15.05	
	1	2	Sarra Lajnef (TUN)	DNS	
	1	4	Sara El Bekri (MAR)	DNS	
	2	1	Konstantina Papailia (GRE)	DNS	

=== Final ===
Rank	Lane	Athlete	Time	Notes
1st place, gold medalist(s)	3	Giulia De Ascentis (ITA)	1:08.57	
2nd place, silver medalist(s)	5	Jessica Vall (ESP)	1:08.80	
3rd place, bronze medalist(s)	4	Dilara Buse Gunaydin (TUR)	1:09.00	
4	1	Michela Guzzetti (ITA)	1:09.09	
5	6	Coralie Dobral (FRA)	1:10.00	
6	2	Maria Georgia Michalaka (GRE)	1:10.46	
7	7	Tjaša Vozel (SLO)	1:11.30	
8	8	Fanny Deberghes (FRA)	1:12.44	
