= Swimming at the 2013 Mediterranean Games – Men's 100 metre breaststroke =

Men's 100 metre breaststroke at the 2013 Mediterranean Games
- Dates: June 21, 2013
- Competitors: 19 from 13 nations
- Winning time: 1:00.86

Medalists
gold medal	Fabio Scozzoli	Italy
silver medal	Andrea Toniato	Italy
bronze medal	Panagiotis Samilidis	Greece

The men's 100 metre breaststroke competition of the swimming events at the 2013 Mediterranean Games took place on June 21 at the Mersin Olympic Swimming Pool in Mersin, Turkey.

The race consisted of two lengths of the pool in breaststroke.

== Records ==
Prior to this competition, the existing world and Mediterranean Games records were as follows:

World record	Cameron van der Burgh (RSA)	58.46	London, Great Britain	July 29, 2012
Mediterranean Games record	Melquiades Alvarez (ESP)	1:00.45	Pescara, Italy	June 27, 2009

== Results ==
All times are in minutes and seconds.

KEY:	q	Fastest non-qualifiers	Q	Qualified	GR	Games record	NR	National record	PB	Personal best	SB	Seasonal best

=== Heats ===
Rank	Heat	Lane	Athlete	Time	Notes
1	2	4	Andrea Toniato (ITA)	1:01.95	Q
2	2	3	Demir Atasoy (TUR)	1:02.13	Q
3	2	5	Panagiotis Samilidis (GRE)	1:02.31	Q
4	3	4	Fabio Scozzoli (ITA)	1:02.94	Q
5	1	4	Damir Dugonjič (SLO)	1:02.95	Q
6	3	6	Dimitrios Koulouris (GRE)	1:03.02	Q
7	3	3	Ömer Aslanoglu (TUR)	1:03.21	Q
8	1	6	Patrick Perisser (FRA)	1:03.44	Q
9	1	3	William Debourges (FRA)	1:03.81	
10	2	6	Hector Monteagudo (ESP)	1:04.38	
11	1	5	Matjaž Markič (SLO)	1:04.89	
12	3	2	Abdelkader Afane (ALG)	1:05.40	
13	2	7	Igor Terzić (SRB)	1:06.14	
14	3	7	Damjan Petrovski (MKD)	1:06.42	
15	1	2	Lefkios Xanthou (CYP)	1:07.54	
16	2	2	Adam Allouche (LIB)	1:10.78	
17	1	7	Donado Dervishi (ALB)	1:11.89	
18	3	1	Yousuf Eltagouri (LBA)	1:16.83	
	3	5	Čaba Silađi (SRB)	DNS	

=== Final ===
Rank	Lane	Athlete	Time	Notes
1st place, gold medalist(s)	6	Fabio Scozzoli (ITA)	1:00.86	
2nd place, silver medalist(s)	4	Andrea Toniato (ITA)	1:01.23	
3rd place, bronze medalist(s)	3	Panagiotis Samilidis (GRE)	1:01.71	
4	5	Demir Atasoy (TUR)	1:02.04	
5	2	Damir Dugonjič (SLO)	1:02.14	
6	7	Dimitrios Koulouris (GRE)	1:02.85	
7	8	Patrick Perisser (FRA)	1:03.09	
8	1	Ömer Aslanoglu (TUR)	1:03.37	
