= Swimming at the 2013 Mediterranean Games – Women's 100 metre freestyle S10 =

Women's 100 metre freestyle S10 at the 2013 Mediterranean Games
- Venue: Mersin Olympic Swimming Pool
- Location: Mersin, Turkey
- Dates: 23 June
- Competitors: 8 from 5 nations
- Winning time: 1:03.94

Medalists
gold medal	Sarai Gascón Moreno	Spain
silver medal	Esther Morales Fernández	Spain
bronze medal	Anaëlle Roulet	France

The women's 100 metre freestyle S10 competition at the 2013 Mediterranean Games was held on 23 June 2018 at the Mersin Olympic Swimming Pool.

== Schedule ==
All times are Eastern European Summer Time (UTC+03:00)

Date	Time	Event
Sunday, 23 June 2013	18:00	Final

== Records ==
World record	Sophie Pascoe (NZL)	1:00.37	Sheffield, United Kingdom	7 April 2012

== Results ==
Rank	Lane	Name	Nationality	Time	Notes
1st place, gold medalist(s)	3	Sarai Gascón Moreno	Spain	1:03.94	
2nd place, silver medalist(s)	5	Esther Morales Fernández	Spain	1:05.50	
3rd place, bronze medalist(s)	4	Anaëlle Roulet	France	1:06.36	
4	6	Francesca Secci	Italy	1:09.22	
5	2	Şebnem Güre	Turkey	1:12.27	
6	7	Marcela Mikulčić	Croatia	1:19.33	
7	1	Nataša Sobočan	Croatia	1:27.46	
8	8	Özlem Kaya	Turkey	1:35.28	
