= Swimming at the 2013 Mediterranean Games – Women's 50 metre backstroke =

Women's 50 metre backstroke at the 2013 Mediterranean Games
- Venue: Mersin Olympic Swimming Pool
- Dates: June 21, 2013
- Competitors: 13 from 9 nations
- Winning time: 28.48

Medalists
gold medal	Sanja Jovanović	Croatia
silver medal	Theodora Drakou	Greece
bronze medal	Arianna Barbieri	Italy

The women's 50 metre backstroke competition of the swimming events at the 2013 Mediterranean Games took place on June 21 at the Mersin Olympic Swimming Pool. Italy's Elena Gemo was the defending champion.

The race consisted of one length of the pool in backstroke.

== Schedule ==
All times are Eastern European Summer Time (UTC+03:00)

Date	Time	Event
Friday, 21 June 2013	09:30	Heats
Friday, 21 June 2013	18:00	Final

== Records ==
Prior to this competition, the existing world and Mediterranean Games records were as follows:

World record	Zhao Jing (CHN)	27.06	Rome, Italy	July 30, 2009
Mediterranean Games record	Elena Gemo (ITA)	28.60	Pescara, Italy	June 27, 2009

== Results ==
All times are in minutes and seconds.

KEY:	q	Fastest non-qualifiers	Q	Qualified	GR	Games record	NR	National record	PB	Personal best	SB	Seasonal best

=== Heats ===
Rank	Heat	Lane	Athlete	Time	Notes
1	2	5	Theodora Drakou (GRE)	28.87	Q
2	1	4	Arianna Barbieri (ITA)	29.04	Q
3	2	4	Sanja Jovanović (CRO)	29.14	Q
4	2	6	Mathilde Cini (FRA)	29.45	Q
5	2	3	Hazal Sarikaya (TUR)	29.65	Q
6	1	3	Béryl Gastaldello (FRA)	29.70	Q
7	1	5	Elena Gemo (ITA)	29.75	Q
8	2	2	Lidón Muñoz (ESP)	29.81	Q
9	2	7	Lucija Kous (SLO)	29.95	
10	1	6	Gizem Çam (TUR)	30.13	
11	1	2	Aspasia Petradaki (GRE)	30.18	
12	1	7	Amel Melih (ALG)	30.97	
13	2	1	Anxhela Kashari (ALB)	34.11	

=== Final ===
Rank	Lane	Athlete	Time	Notes
1st place, gold medalist(s)	3	Sanja Jovanović (CRO)	28.48	GR
2nd place, silver medalist(s)	4	Theodora Drakou (GRE)	28.66	
3rd place, bronze medalist(s)	5	Arianna Barbieri (ITA)	28.74	
4	7	Béryl Gastaldello (FRA)	28.92	
5	6	Mathilde Cini (FRA)	29.09	
6	1	Elena Gemo (ITA)	29.16	
7	8	Lidón Muñoz (ESP)	29.66	
8	2	Hazal Sarikaya (TUR)	29.68	
