= Taekwondo at the 2013 Mediterranean Games – Men's +80 kg =

The men's +80 kg competition of the taekwondo events at the 2013 Mediterranean Games took place on the 21 of June at the Edip Buran Arena.

== Schedule ==
All times are Eastern European Summer Time (UTC+3).

| Date | Time | Round |
|---|---|---|
| June 21, 2013 | 09:00 | Preliminaries |
| June 21, 2013 | 14:00 | Finals |

== Results ==
Legend

- PTG — Won by Points Gap
- SUP — Won by Superiority
- OT — Won on over time (Golden Point)

=== Main bracket ===
Preliminary round
Badreddin Khalfuni (LBA) | 5
Antreas Stylianou (CYP) | 4
Mikel Bernal (ESP) | 5
Bouazza El Hainouni (MAR) | 4
Ali Sarı (TUR) | 2
Anthony Junique (FRA) | 1
Yassine Trablesi (TUN) | 15 (PTG)
Carlos Moreno (AND) | 1
Jane Stojchevski (MKD) | 1
Mohammed Hassan (EGY) | 7

Quarterfinals
Leonardo Basile (ITA) | 12
Badreddin Khalfuni (LBA) | 2
Mikel Bernal (ESP) | 8
Ali Sarı (TUR) | 14
Yassine Trablesi (TUN) | 0
Alexandros Nikolaidis (GRE) | 3
Mohammed Hassan (EGY) | 2
Vanja Babić (SRB) | 4

Semifinals
Leonardo Basile (ITA) | 2
Ali Sarı (TUR) | 3
Alexandros Nikolaidis (GRE) | w/o
Vanja Babić (SRB)

Gold medal match
Ali Sarı (TUR) | 5
Alexandros Nikolaidis (GRE) | 0
