= Swimming at the 2013 Mediterranean Games – Men's 50 metre backstroke =

Men's 50 metre backstroke at the 2013 Mediterranean Games
- Venue: Mersin Olympic Swimming Pool
- Dates: June 21, 2013
- Competitors: 11 from 8 nations
- Winning time: 25:35

Medalists
gold medal	Mauro Pizzamiglio	Italy
silver medal	Niccolò Bonacchi	Italy
bronze medal	Juan Francisco Segura	Spain

The men's 50 metre backstroke competition of the swimming events at the 2013 Mediterranean Games took place on June 21 at the Mersin Olympic Swimming Pool in Mersin, Turkey.

The race consisted of one length of the pool in backstroke.

== Schedule ==
All times are Eastern European Summer Time (UTC+03:00)

Date	Time	Event
Friday, 21 June 2013	09:35	Heats
Friday, 21 June 2013	18:05	Final

== Records ==
Prior to this competition, the existing world and Mediterranean Games records were as follows:

World record	Liam Tancock (GBR)	24.04	Rome, Italy	August 2, 2009
Mediterranean Games record	Aschwin Wildeboer (ESP)	24.73	Pescara, Italy	June 27, 2009

== Results ==
All times are in minutes and seconds.

KEY:	q	Fastest non-qualifiers	Q	Qualified	GR	Games record	NR	National record	PB	Personal best	SB	Seasonal best

=== Heats ===
Rank	Heat	Lane	Athlete	Time	Notes
1	2	5	Oscar Pereiro (ESP)	25.51	Q
2	1	3	Juan Francisco Segura (ESP)	25.86	Q
3	1	4	Niccolò Bonacchi (ITA)	25.87	Q
4	2	4	Mauro Pizzamiglio (ITA)	26.06	Q
5	1	5	Güven Duvan (TUR)	26.07	Q
6	1	6	Bilal Achelhi (MAR)	26.24	Q
7	2	3	Eric Ress (FRA)	26.40	Q
8	2	6	Burak Kartal (TUR)	26.94	Q
9	1	2	Robert Žbogar (SLO)	27.12	
10	2	7	Gorazd Chepishevski (MKD)	28.19	
11	2	2	Sofyan El Gadi (LBA)	28.61	

=== Final ===
Rank	Lane	Athlete	Time	Notes
1st place, gold medalist(s)	4	Mauro Pizzamiglio (ITA)	25:35	
2nd place, silver medalist(s)	3	Niccolò Bonacchi (ITA)	25.42	
3rd place, bronze medalist(s)	5	Juan Francisco Segura (ESP)	25.66	
4	6	Oscar Pereiro (ESP)	25.76	
5	2	Güven Duvan (TUR)	25:89	
6	1	Eric Ress (FRA)	26.12	
7	7	Bilal Achelhi (MAR)	26.38	
8	8	Burak Kartal (TUR)	26.99	
