= Weightlifting at the 2013 Mediterranean Games – Women's 48 kg =

The women's 48 kg competition of the weightlifting events at the 2013 Mediterranean Games in Mersin, Turkey, was held on June 21 at the Erdemli Sports Hall.

Each lifter performed in both the snatch and clean and jerk lifts, with the final score being the sum of the lifter's best result in each. The athlete received three attempts in each of the two lifts; the score for the lift was the heaviest weight successfully lifted. This weightlifting event was the lightest men's event at the weightlifting competition, limiting competitors to a maximum of 48 kilograms of body mass.

== Schedule ==
All times are Eastern European Summer Time (UTC+3).

Date	Time	Round
June 21, 2013	16:00	Final

== Results ==
5 athletes from five countries will take part.

=== Snatch ===
Rank	Name	Group	B.weight (kg)	Snatch (kg)
1st place, gold medalist(s)	Jenny Caterina Pagliaro (ITA)	A	47.56	79
2nd place, silver medalist(s)	Sibel Özkan Konak (TUR)	A	46.96	78
3rd place, bronze medalist(s)	Basma Ibrahim (EGY)	A	47.94	74
4	Estefania Juan Tello (ESP)	A	47.58	73
5	Anais Michel (FRA)	A	47.78	68

=== Clean & Jerk ===
Rank	Name	Group	B.weight (kg)	Clean & Jerk (kg)
1st place, gold medalist(s)	Jenny Caterina Pagliaro (ITA)	A	47.56	100
2nd place, silver medalist(s)	Estefania Juan Tello (ESP)	A	47.58	94
3rd place, bronze medalist(s)	Basma Ibrahim (EGY)	A	47.94	90
4	Anais Michel (FRA)	A	47.78	88
—	Sibel Özkan Konak (TUR)	A	46.96	—
