= Swimming at the 2013 Mediterranean Games – Men's 200 metre individual medley =

Men's 200 metre individual medley at the 2013 Mediterranean Games
- Dates: June 21, 2013
- Competitors: 12 from 9 nations
- Winning time: 1:59.35

Medalists
gold medal	Federico Turrini	Italy
silver medal	Oussama Mellouli	Tunisia
bronze medal	Andreas Vazaios	Greece

The men's 200 metre individual medley competition of the swimming events at the 2013 Mediterranean Games took place on June 21 at the Mersin Olympic Swimming Pool in Mersin, Turkey. Oussama Mellouli of Tunisia is the defending champion from 2009 Mediterranean Games.

The race consisted of four lengths of the pool in four different styles.

== Records ==
Prior to this competition, the existing world and Mediterranean Games records were as follows:

World record	Ryan Lochte (USA)	1:54.00	Shanghai, China	July 28, 2011
Mediterranean Games record	Oussama Mellouli (TUN)	1:58.38	Pescara, Italy	June 27, 2009

== Results ==
All times are in minutes and seconds.

KEY:	q	Fastest non-qualifiers	Q	Qualified	GR	Games record	NR	National record	PB	Personal best	SB	Seasonal best

=== Heats ===
Rank	Heat	Lane	Athlete	Time	Notes
1	1	4	Federico Turrini (ITA)	2:03.37	Q
2	1	5	Taki Mrabet (TUN)	2:03.39	Q
3	1	3	Ganesh Pedurand (FRA)	2:03.96	Q
4	2	4	Oussama Mellouli (TUN)	2:04.83	Q
5	2	3	Andreas Vazaios (GRE)	2:05.11	Q
6	2	2	Alpkan Ornek (TUR)	2:05.22	Q
7	2	6	Alejandro Garcia (ESP)	2:06.21	Q
8	1	6	Timur Dellaloglu (TUR)	2:06.24	Q
9	2	7	Nikola Trajković (SRB)	2:07.83	
10	1	2	Mohamed Gadallh (ALG)	2:08.40	
11	2	5	Fabio Scozzoli (ITA)	2:08.65	
12	1	7	Yousef Abdusalam (LBA)	2:56.73	

=== Final ===
Rank	Lane	Athlete	Time	Notes
1st place, gold medalist(s)	4	Federico Turrini (ITA)	1:59.35	
2nd place, silver medalist(s)	6	Oussama Mellouli (TUN)	2:00.09	
3rd place, bronze medalist(s)	2	Andreas Vazaios (GRE)	2:00.74	
4	5	Taki Mrabet (TUN)	2:01.85	
5	3	Ganesh Pedurand (FRA)	2:02.18	
6	7	Alpkan Ornek (TUR)	2:04.61	
7	1	Alejandro Garcia (ESP)	2:07.23	
8	8	Timur Dellaloglu (TUR)	2:07.59	
