= Sağır =

Sağır is a surname. Notable people with the surname include:

- Nezir Sağır (born 1983), Turkish weightlifter
- Taner Sağır (born 1985), Turkish weightlifter
