= Andrea Toniato =

Italian swimmer (born 1991)

Personal information
- Born: 27 February 1991 (age 35) Cittadella, Italy

Sport
- Sport: Swimming
- Strokes: Breaststroke
Medal record
Men's swimming
Representing Italy
Mediterranean Games
Gold medal – first place	2013 Mersin	4×100 m medley
Silver medal – second place	2013 Mersin	50 m breaststroke
Silver medal – second place	2013 Mersin	100 m breaststroke
Universiade
Silver medal – second place	2013 Kazan	50 m breaststroke
Silver medal – second place	2015 Gwangju	50 m breaststroke
Military World Games
Bronze medal – third place	2019 Wuhan	50 m breaststroke

Andrea Toniato (born 27 February 1991) is an Italian swimmer. He competed in the men's 100 metre breaststroke event at the 2016 Summer Olympics.
