= Martina De Memme =

Italian swimmer (born 1991)

Personal information
- Born: 7 August 1991 (age 34) Livorno, Italy

Sport
- Sport: Swimming
Medal record
Women's swimming
Representing Italy
Event	1st	2nd	3rd
European Championships (LC)	1	0	0
Universiade	2	0	2
Mediterranean Games	3	0	0
Total	6	0	2
European Championships (LC)
Gold medal – first place	2012 Debrecen	4×200 m freestyle
Universiade
Gold medal – first place	2013 Kazan	400 m freestyle
Gold medal – first place	2013 Kazan	800 m freestyle
Bronze medal – third place	2015 Gwangju	200 m freestyle
Bronze medal – third place	2015 Gwangju	400 m freestyle
Mediterranean Games
Gold medal – first place	2013 Mersin	200 m freestyle
Gold medal – first place	2013 Mersin	400 m freestyle
Gold medal – first place	2013 Mersin	800 m freestyle

Martina De Memme (born 7 August 1991) is an Italian swimmer. She competed in the women's 4 × 200 metre freestyle relay event at the 2016 Summer Olympics.
