= Maria Grazia Alemanno =

Italian weightlifter (born 1990)

Personal information
- Born: 2 September 1990 (age 35) Galatina, Italy

Sport
- Country: Italy
- Sport: Weightlifting

Maria Grazia Alemanno (born 2 September 1990) is an Italian weightlifter. In 2021, she represented Italy at the 2020 Summer Olympics in Tokyo, Japan. She finished in 11th place in the women's 59 kg event.

== Career ==
She represented Italy at the 2013 Mediterranean Games held in Mersin, Turkey. She competed in the women's 69 kg event where she finished in 5th place in both the Snatch and the Clean & Jerk events. She also represented Italy at the 2018 Mediterranean Games held in Tarragona, Catalonia, Spain.

In 2020, she won the silver medal in the women's 59 kg Snatch event at the Roma 2020 World Cup in Rome, Italy.

== Major results ==
Year	Venue	Weight	Snatch (kg)				Clean & Jerk (kg)				Total	Rank
Year	Venue	Weight	1	2	3	Rank	1	2	3	Rank	Total	Rank
Summer Olympics
2021	Tokyo, Japan	59 kg	85	~~88~~	~~89~~	—N/a	100	~~105~~	~~105~~	—N/a	185	11
