= Aurora Ponselé =

Italian swimmer

Personal information
- National team: Italy
- Born: 4 April 1992 (age 34) Fano, Italy
- Height: 1.74 m (5 ft 9 in)
- Weight: 60 kg (132 lb)

Sport
- Sport: Swimming
- Strokes: Freestyle
- Club: Fiamme Oro
Medal record
Representing Italy
Summer Universiade
Silver medal – second place	2013 Kazan	10km open water
European Championships
Bronze medal – third place	2014 Berlin	10km open water
Mediterranean Games
Silver medal – second place	2013 Mersin	800m freestyle

Aurora Ponselé (born 4 April 1992) is an Italian open water swimmer who won bronze medal at the European Championships on 10 km.

== Biography ==
Ponselé also competed swimming in pool, where she won a silver medal on 800 metres freestyle at the 2013 Mediterranean Games.

== Achievements ==
Year	Competition	Venue	Position	Event	Time
2013	Mediterranean Games	(Turkey) Mersin	2nd	800 m	8:40.70
2013	Universiade	(Russia) Kazan	2nd	10 km	2:05:31.9
2015	European Championships	(Germany) Berlin	3rd	10 km	1:56:08.5
