= Dilara Buse Günaydın =

Turkish swimmer (born 1989)

Personal information
- Nationality: TUR
- Born: July 5, 1989 (age 37) Gölcük, Kocaeli Province, Turkey
- Height: 168 cm (5 ft 6 in)
- Weight: 57 kg (126 lb)

Sport
- Sport: Swimming
- Strokes: Breaststroke
- Club: Galatasaray Swimming
Medal record
Women's Swimming
Representing Turkey
Mediterranean Games
Silver medal – second place	2013 Mersin	50 m breaststroke
Bronze medal – third place	2013 Mersin	100 m breaststroke
Bronze medal – third place	2013 Mersin	200 m breaststroke

Dilara Buse Günaydın (born July 5, 1989 in Gölcük, Kocaeli Province, Turkey) is a Turkish swimmer competing in the breaststroke events. The 168 cm (5 ft 6 in) tall sportswoman at 57 kg (126 lb) transferred to Galatasaray Swimming from Fenerbahçe Swimming.

She graduated from Journalism Department at the Faculty of Communications from Istanbul University.

Günaydın is holder of the national record in 50 m breastroke with 31.63 set at the 2009 European Short Course Swimming Championships in Istanbul, Turkey.

She represented her country in the 100 m and 200 m breaststroke events at the Summer Olympics in Beijing, China without advancing to the finals. Günaydın qualified to participate in the 100 m breaststroke event at the 2012 Summer Olympics by setting a new national record with 1.09.27. At the 2012 Summer Olympics, she competed in the 100 and 200 m breaststroke.

Günaydın improved her own national record to 31.23 in the semifinals of 50 m breaststroke event at the 2012 European Short Course Swimming Championships held in Chartres, France, where she ranked 8th in the finals.

At the 2013 Mediterranean Games held in Mersin, Turkey, she won one silver and two bronze medals.

== Achievements ==
Year	Competition	Venue	Position	Event	Notes
Representing Turkey
2008	Summer Olympics-Preliminaries	Beijing, China	28th	100 m breaststroke	1:10.45
2008	Summer Olympics-Preliminaries	Beijing, China	32nd	200 m breaststroke	2:31.86
2009	European Short Course Championships-Preliminaries	Istanbul, Turkey	35th	50 m breaststroke	31.63 NR
2012	European Aquatics Championships-Preliminaries	Eindhoven, Netherlands	13th	100 m breaststroke	1.09.27 NR
2012	European Short Course Swimming Championships	Chartres, France	8th	50 m breaststroke	31.30
2013	Mediterranean Games	Mersin, Turkey	2nd place, silver medalist(s)	50 m breaststroke	32.04 NR
2013	Mediterranean Games	Mersin, Turkey	3rd place, bronze medalist(s)	100 m breaststroke	1:09.00 NR
2013	Mediterranean Games	Mersin, Turkey	3rd place, bronze medalist(s)	200 m breaststroke	2:28.20 NR

== See also ==
- Turkish women in sports
