= Taekwondo at the 2013 Mediterranean Games – Women's 49 kg =

The women's 49 kg competition of the taekwondo events at the 2013 Mediterranean Games took place on the 21 of June at the Edip Buran Arena.

== Schedule ==
All times are Eastern European Summer Time (UTC+3).

| Date | Time | Round |
|---|---|---|
| June 21, 2013 | 09:00 | Preliminaries |
| June 21, 2013 | 14:00 | Finals |

== Results ==
Legend

- PTG — Won by Points Gap
- SUP — Won by Superiority
- OT — Won on over time (Golden Point)

=== Main bracket ===
Preliminary round
Paula Benes (ESP) | 4
Ioanna Koutsou (GRE) | 3
Anouk Doria (MON) | 6
Jessica Rovira (AND) | 7

Quarterfinals
Rukiye Yildirim (TUR) | 4
Paula Benes (ESP) | 3
Kyriaki Kouttouki (CYP) | 6
Roberta Ramazzotto (ITA) | 3
Ana Petrušič (SLO) | 9
Fadia Farhani (TUN) | 3
Jessica Rovira (AND) | 1
Nour Abdelsalam (EGY) | 13

Semifinals
Rukiye Yildirim (TUR) | 3
Kyriaki Kouttouki (CYP) | 1
Ana Petrušič (SLO) | 0
Nour Abdelsalam (EGY) | 4

Gold medal match
Rukiye Yildirim (TUR) | 11
Nour Abdelsalam (EGY) | 12
