= Matteo Milli =

Italian swimmer

Personal information
- Born: 22 April 1989 (age 37)

Sport
- Sport: Swimming
Medal record
Representing Italy
Mediterranean Games
| Gold medal – first place | 2013 Mersin | 100m backstroke |
| Gold medal – first place | 2013 Mersin | 4x100m medley relay |

Matteo Milli (born 22 April 1989) is an Italian swimmer. He competed in the men's 50 metre backstroke event at the 2017 World Aquatics Championships.
