= Rubén López (gymnast) =

Spanish gymnast

- Full name: Rubén López Martínez
- Born: 28 November 1990 (age 35) Sabadell, Spain
- Height: 1.70 m (5 ft 7 in)

Gymnastics career
- Discipline: Men's artistic gymnastics
- Country represented: Spain; (2006–2021)
- Gym: Club Gimnàstic Sant Boi
Medal record
Men's artistic gymnastics
Representing Spain
Mediterranean Games
Gold medal – first place	2013 Mersin	Team
Silver medal – second place	2013 Mersin	Parallel bars
- Coaching career

Current position
- Title: Associate Head Coach
- Team: Stanford Cardinal
- Conference: MPSF

Coaching career (HC unless noted)
- 2024–2026: Stanford (Assistant)
- 2027–present: Stanford (Associate HC)

Rubén López Martínez (born 28 November 1990) is a Spanish gymnast. He competed at the 2012 Summer Olympics. He also competed at five World Championships (2011, 2014, 2015, 2017 and 2018).

He began gymnastic training at the age of seven, training at the Granollers Club. He was interested in the sport due to watching the performances of Li Xiaopeng at the 2000 Summer Olympics.

At the 2013 Mediterranean Games, López won a gold medal in the team all-around and a silver medal on the parallel bars.

He is an assistant coach for the Stanford Cardinal men's gymnastics team.
