= Stefania Pirozzi =

Italian swimmer (born 1993)

Personal information
- National team: Italy
- Born: 16 December 1993 (age 32) Benevento, Italy

Sport
- Sport: Swimming
Medal record
Women's swimming
Representing Italy
European Championships (LC)
Gold medal – first place	2014 Berlin	4×200 m freestyle
Silver medal – second place	2020 Budapest	4×200 m mixed freestyle
Bronze medal – third place	2020 Budapest	4×200 m freestyle
European Championships (SC)
Silver medal – second place	2012 Chartres	200 m butterfly
Mediterranean Games
Gold medal – first place	2013 Mersin	200 m butterfly
Gold medal – first place	2013 Mersin	4×200 m freestyle
Gold medal – first place	2018 Tarragona	4×200 m freestyle
Silver medal – second place	2013 Mersin	200 m medley
European Junior Championships
Silver medal – second place	2009 Prague	400 m freestyle
Bronze medal – third place	2009 Prague	200 m medley
Bronze medal – third place	2009 Prague	400 m medley

Stefania Pirozzi (born 16 December 1993 in Benevento) is an Italian swimmer who competes in the Women's 400m individual medley. At the 2012 Summer Olympics she finished 22nd overall in the heats in the Women's 400 metre individual medley and failed to reach the final. At the 2020 Summer Olympics, she competed in the 4 × 200 m freestyle relay.

Pirozzi is an athlete of the Gruppo Sportivo Fiamme Oro.
