= Nezir Sağır =

Turkish weightlifter (born 1983)

Personal information
- Nationality: Turkish
- Born: October 19, 1983 (age 42) Isperih, Bulgaria
- Height: 1.74 m (5 ft 8 1/2 in)
- Weight: 88 kg (194 lb; 13.9 st)

Sport
- Country: Turkey
- Sport: Weightlifting
- Event: –85 kg
- Club: Ankara Demir Spor
- Coached by: Osman Nuri Vural
Medal record
Islamic Solidarity Games
Silver medal – second place	2013 Palembang	85 kg
Mediterranean Games
Silver medal – second place	2013 Mersin	–85 kg Clean&Jerk

Nezir Sağır (born October 19, 1983 in Isperih, Bulgaria) is a Turkish weightlifter competing in the –85 kg division. The 1.74 m (5 ft 8 1/2 in) tall athlete at 88 kg (194 lb; 13.9 st) is a member of Ankara Demir Spor, where he is coached by Osman Nuri Vural.

== Early years ==
He was born in Bulgaria to parents of Turkish ethnicity. The family emigrated in 1989, to Turkey, settled first in the Batıkent neighborhood of Yenimahalle, Ankara, and moved later to Pursaklar, Ankara. He began weightlifting in Pursaklar in 1994. Nezir Sağır is the older brother of Olympic, world and European weightlifting champion Taner Sağır.

== Sports career ==
He participated at the 2012 Summer Olympics. He was included in the Turkish Olympics team as a placeholder after European champion in the -85 kg division Fatih Baydar tested positive in a doping check made on July 3, of which result was notified on July 23, shortly before the departure of the Turkish athletes to London.

At the 2013 Mediterranean Games held in Mersin, Turkey, he won the silver medal in the –85 kg Clean&Jerk division.

Sağır took the silver medal in the -85 kg division at the 2013 Islamic Solidarity Games in Palembang, Indonesia.
