= Thibaut Simon =

French water polo player (born 1983)

Personal information
- Born: 18 December 1983 (age 42) Créteil, France
- Height: 192 cm (6 ft 4 in)
- Weight: 98 kg (216 lb)

Sport
- Country: France
- Sport: Water polo
- Club: CN Marseille

Thibaut Simon (born 18 December 1983) is a water polo player from France. He was part of the French team at the 2016 Summer Olympics, where the team was eliminated in the group stage.
