= Anja Klinar =

Slovenian swimmer (born 1988)

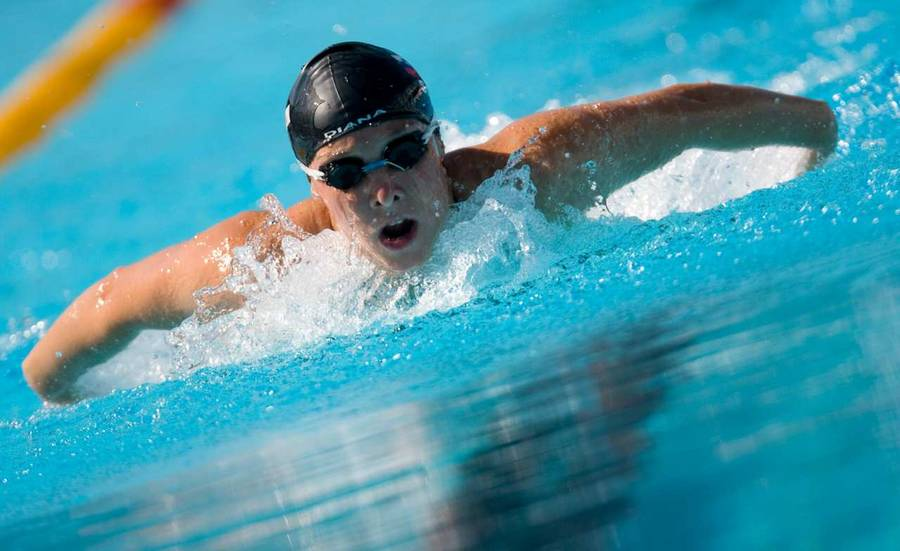

Personal information
- Born: 3 April 1988 (age 38) Jesenice, SFR Yugoslavia
Medal record
Women's swimming
Representing Slovenia
European Championships (LC)
Bronze medal – third place	2004 Madrid	400 m medley
Bronze medal – third place	2012 Debrecen	4×200 m freestyle
European Championships (SC)
Silver medal – second place	2010 Eindhoven	400 m medley
Mediterranean Games
Gold medal – first place	2005 Almería	200 m medley
Gold medal – first place	2009 Pescara	400 m medley
Gold medal – first place	2013 Mersin	200 m medley
Gold medal – first place	2013 Mersin	400 m medley
Silver medal – second place	2005 Almería	400 m medley
Silver medal – second place	2013 Mersin	400 m freestyle
Silver medal – second place	2013 Mersin	200 m butterfly
Bronze medal – third place	2013 Mersin	4×200 m freestyle

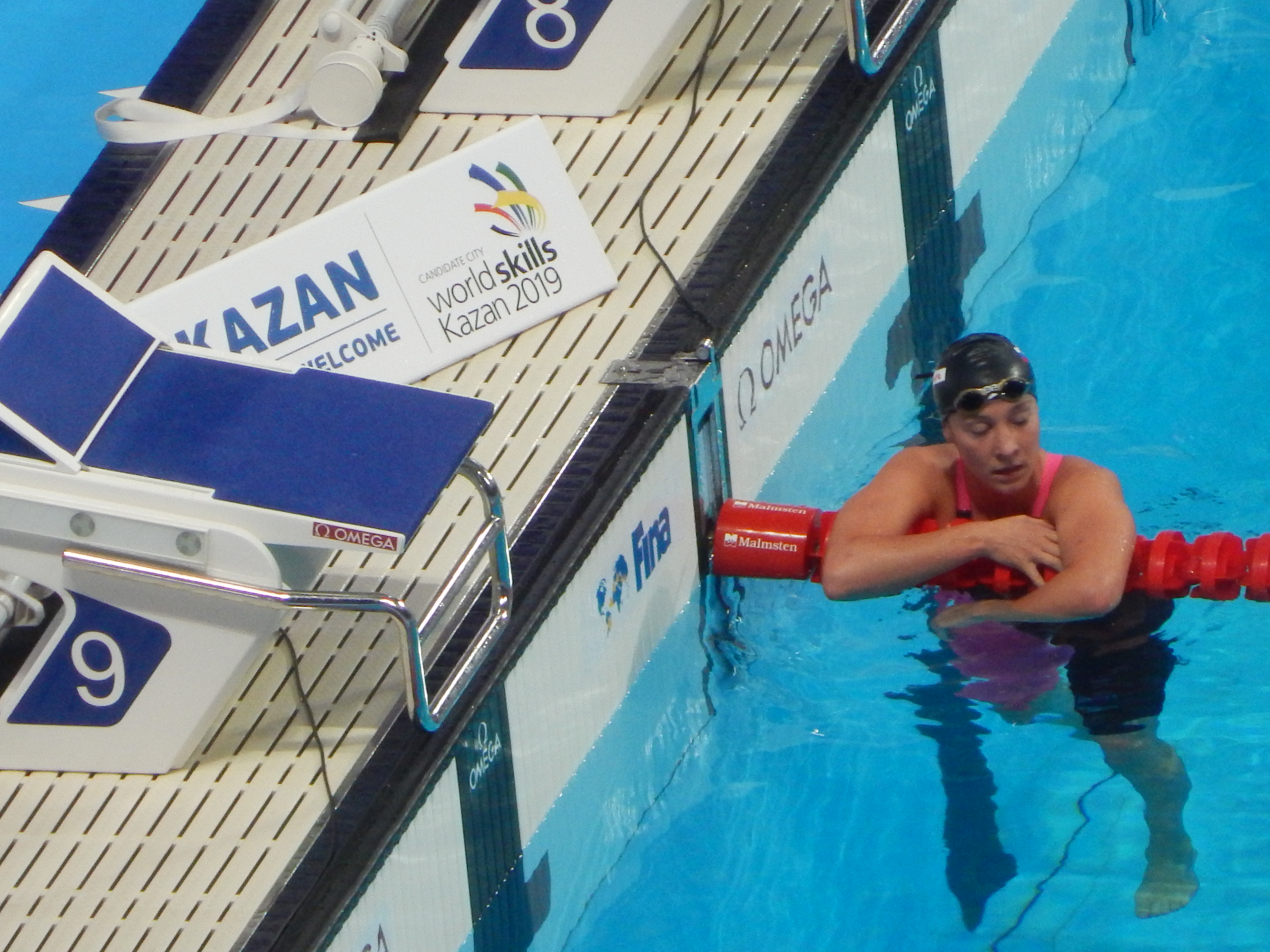
Anja in Kazan 2015

Anja Klinar (born 3 April 1988) is a butterfly and medley swimmer from Slovenia. She has competed for her native country at four Olympic Games, from 2004–2016. She represented Slovenia in the 4 × 200 m freestyle relay, 200 m butterfly and 400 individual medley at the 2004 Olympics, the 200 and 400 m individual medley at the 2008 Summer Olympics, the 4 × 200 m freestyle relay, 200 m butterfly and the 400 m individual medley at the 2012 Summer Olympics and the 200 m butterfly and the 4 × 200 m freestyle at the 2016 Olympics.

She is also a two-time gold medalist at the Mediterranean Games in the individual medley events, and medaled at both the short course and long course European Swimming Championships.
