= Ali Sarı =

Turkish taekwondo practitioner

Personal information
- Nationality: Turkish
- Born: November 24, 1986 (age 39) Beyşehir, Konya Province, Turkey
- Weight: Heavyweight

Sport
- Country: Turkey
- Sport: Taekwondo
- Coached by: Ekrem Boyalı
Medal record
Taekwondo
Representing Turkey
European Taekwondo Championships
| Bronze medal – third place | 2012 Manchester | -87kg |
Mediterranean Games
| Gold medal – first place | 2013 Mersin | +80kg |
Universiade
| Silver medal – second place | 2011 Shenzhen | +87kg |
| Bronze medal – third place | 2007 Bangkok | -84kg |

Ali Sarı (born November 24, 1986) is a Turkish taekwondo practitioner competing in the heavyweight division. Ali Sarı is a student of civil engineering at Selçuk University.

== Early life ==
Ali Sarı was born on November 24, 1986, in Beyşehir town in Konya Province to a dentist father. He has two younger brothers Yunus and Talha, who are also successful taekwondo practitioners. After his primary and secondary education in his hometown, he enrolled in Selçuk University's Faculty of Engineering and Architecture, at Konya.

== Sports career ==
Ali Sarı began with taekwondo practitioning already at the very young age. His family built a sports center with three floors, where he and his brothers exercised with young people in the town. Living currently in Konya for his university education with his two brothers, Ali Sarı is coached by Ekrem Boyalı.

His first national success came in 1998 when he became Turkish boys' champion in the +36 kg division. In 2001, he placed third at the Turkish Youth Championships. Ali Sarı was admitted to the national team in 2006, and took the second place at the national championship the same year.

In 2007, he placed third in the +84 kg division at the 2007 Summer Universiade in Bangkok, Thailand. He won the silver medal in the +87 kg division at the 2011 Summer Universiade held in Shenzhen, China. In 2012, Sarı took the bronze medal in the -87 kg division at the European Championships in Manchester, United Kingdom. He became champion in the +80 kg division at the 2013 Mediterranean Games in Mersin, Turkey.

== Achievements ==
- (bronze) 2007 Summer Universiade, Bangkok, Thailand, -84 kg
- (bronze) 2008 World University Taekwondo Championships, Belgrade, Serbia
- (gold) 2010 Northern Cyprus Open
- (gold) 2010 French Open, Paris
- (silver) 2011 Summer Universiade, Shenzhen, China, +87 kg
- (bronze) 2012 European Championships, Manchester, United Kingdom, -87 kg
- (silver) 2012 Spanish Open, Alicante
- (silver) 2013 Dutch Open, Eindhoven
- (gold) 2013 Mediterranean Games, Mersin, Turkey, +80 kg
