= Fanny Deberghes =

French swimmer

Personal information
- Born: 21 February 1994 (age 32) Agen, France
- Height: 1.70 m (5 ft 7 in)
- Weight: 64 kg (141 lb)

Sport
- Sport: Swimming
- Club: AAS Sarcelles Natation 95

Fanny Deberghes (born 21 February 1994) is a French swimmer. She competed for the French team in the women's 4 × 100 metre medley relay event at the 2016 Summer Olympics.
