= Michela Guzzetti =

Italian swimmer

Personal information
- National team: ITA
- Born: 29 April 1992 (age 34) Tradate, Italy
- Height: 1.73 m (5 ft 8 in)
- Weight: 59 kg (130 lb)

Sport
- Sport: Swimming
- Strokes: Breaststroke

Michela Guzzetti (born 29 April 1992) is an Italian swimmer. She competed for Italy at the 2012 Summer Olympics.
