= Aitor Martínez (swimmer) =

Spanish swimmer

Personal information
- Full name: Aitor Martínez Rodríguez
- Born: 22 August 1993 (age 33) Colmenar Viejo, Madrid, Spain
- Height: 183 cm (6 ft 0 in)
- Weight: 78 kg (172 lb)

Sport
- Sport: Swimming
Medal record
Representing Spain
World Junior Championships
Silver medal – second place	2011 Lima	50m freestyle
European Junior Championships
Gold medal – first place	2011 Belgrade	50 m freestyle
Silver medal – second place	2011 Belgrade	4x100 m freestyle

Aitor Martínez Rodríguez (Note: In this Spanish name, the first or paternal surname is Martínez and the second or maternal family name is Rodríguez.) (born 22 August 1993) is a Spanish freestyle swimmer. He competed in the men's 4 × 100 metre freestyle relay event at the 2016 Summer Olympics.
