= Theodora Drakou =

Greek swimmer

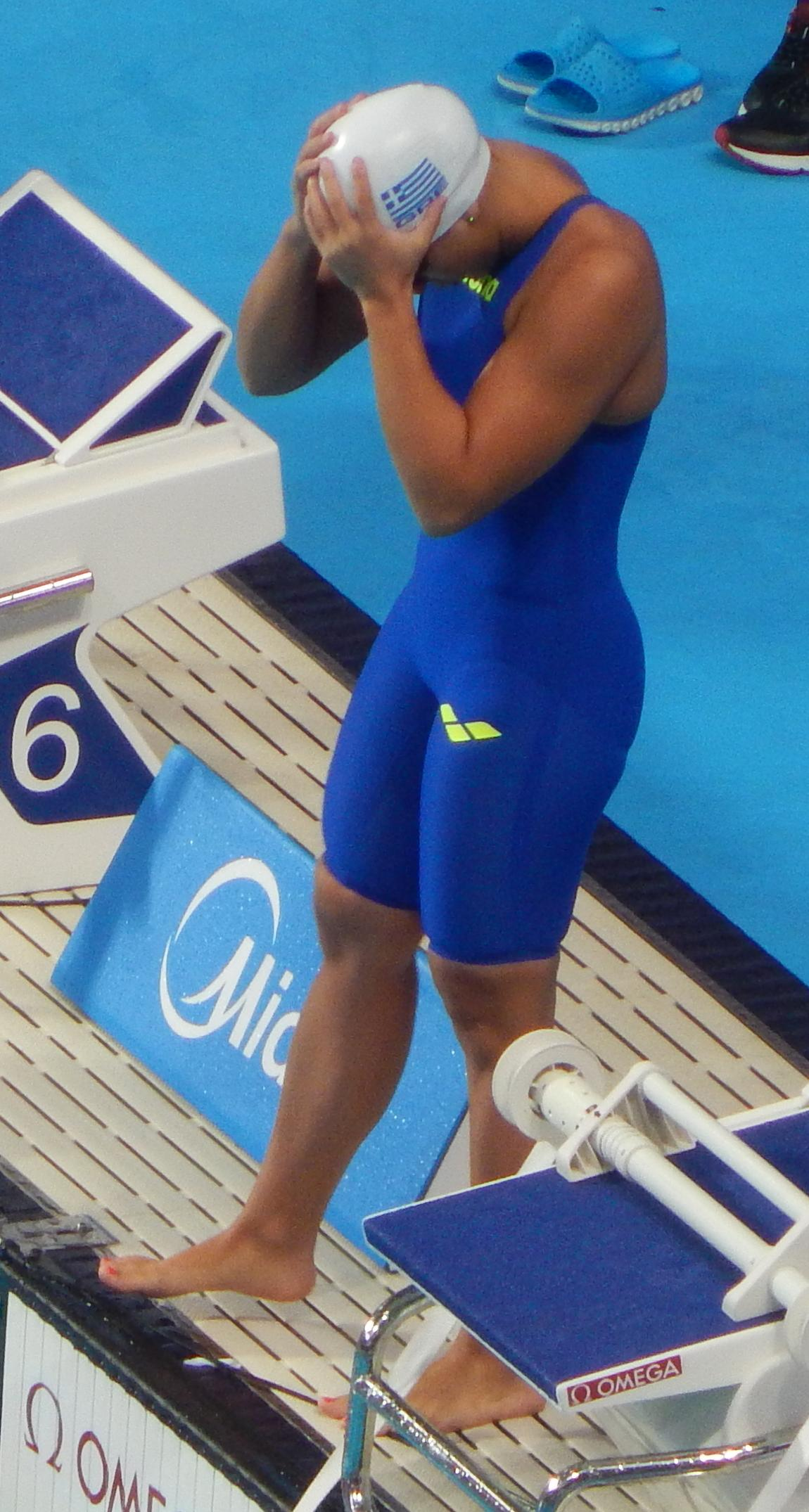
- Drakou at 2015 world championships in Kazan

Personal information
- Full name: Theodora Drakou
- Nickname: "Nora"
- National team: Greece
- Born: 6 February 1992 (age 34) Patras, Greece
- Height: 1.69 m (5 ft 7 in)
- Weight: 67 kg (148 lb)

Sport
- Sport: Swimming
- Strokes: Backstroke, freestyle, medley
- Club: (Greece) Panathinaikos
Medal record
Women's swimming
Representing Greece
European Championships (LC)
Silver medal – second place	2024 Belgrade	50 m freestyle
Silver medal – second place	2024 Belgrade	50 m backstroke
Mediterranean Games
Gold medal – first place	2013 Mersin	100 m freestyle
Silver medal – second place	2013 Mersin	50 m backstroke
Silver medal – second place	2013 Mersin	100 m backstroke
Silver medal – second place	2013 Mersin	4x100 m freestyle
Silver medal – second place	2009 Pescara	100 m freestyle
Bronze medal – third place	2009 Pescara	4x100 m freestyle
Bronze medal – third place	2018 Tarragona	50 m backstroke
Bronze medal – third place	2018 Tarragona	50 m freestyle
Bronze medal – third place	2018 Tarragona	4×100 m medley relay

Theodora (Nora) Drakou (Greek: Θεοδώρα Δράκου) is a Greek competitive swimmer, competing for Panathinaikos.

She made her international debut at the 2008 European Short Course Championships in Rijeka, Croatia. She competed in the 50m freestyle, 100m freestyle, 50m backstroke, 4x50m medley relay, finishing 31st, 42nd and 20th respectively. In 2011, she featured in her first world championships.

At the 2012 Summer Olympics, she competed in the 50 metre freestyle taking the 16th place and for the national team in the 4 x 100 metre freestyle relay, finishing also in the 16th (last) place in the heats, failing to reach the final. Following this, in 2013, she was out for 8 months following shoulder surgery.

At the 2016 Summer Olympics, she again competed in the 50 metre freestyle. That year, she was also one of the Olympic torch carriers.

At the 2020 Summer Olympics, she was part of the Greek 4 × 100 m mixed medley team who did not progress to the final, despite setting a new national record in the heats.

In June 2024, Nora competed in the LEN European Championships in Belgrade, Serbia, placing 2nd in the 50m butterfly with a time of 27.87, and 2nd in the 50m freestyle with a time of 24.59 which earned her a qualification for the Paris 2024 Olympics. Her time in the 50 m freestyle was also a new Greek record.

At the 2024 Paris Olympics, she competed in the 50m freestyle taking the 17th place with a time of 24.80. She was also part of the mixed 4 × 100 m medley relay team.

As of January 2025, she is the national record holder for the 50 m and 100 m backstroke and part of the teams that hold the 4 x 50 m women's medley relay record in the short course pool, and the national record holder for 50 m freestyle, 50 m backstroke and part of the record holding teams for the women's 4 x 100 freestyle, women's 4 x 100 medley, mixed 4 × 100 m freestyle and 4 × 100 m medley.

== Honours ==
Year	Competition	Venue	Position	Notes
Representing Greece
2009	Mediterranean Games	Pescara, Italy	2nd	100 m freestyle
2009	Mediterranean Games	Pescara, Italy	3rd	4 x 100 freestyle relay
2012	European Championships	Debrecen, Hungary	5th	50 m freestyle
2012	European Championships	Debrecen, Hungary	5th	4 x 100 freestyle relay
2012	Olympic Games	London, United Kingdom	16th (sf)	50 m freestyle
2012	Olympic Games	London, United Kingdom	16th (sf)	4 x 100 freestyle relay
2013	Mediterranean Games	Mersin, Turkey	1st	100 m freestyle
2013	Mediterranean Games	Mersin, Turkey	2nd	100 m backstroke
2013	Mediterranean Games	Mersin, Turkey	2nd	50 m backstroke
2013	Mediterranean Games	Mersin, Turkey	2nd	4 x 100 freestyle relay
2015	World Championships	Kazan, Russia	8th	50 m backstroke
2016	European Championships	London, United Kingdom	4th	50 m backstroke
2016	European Championships	London, United Kingdom	5th	50 m freestyle
2016	Olympic Games	Rio de Janeiro	31st (h)	50 m freestyle
2021	Olympic Games	Tokyo, Japan	11th (sf)	Mixed 4 × 100 m medley relay
2024	European Championships	Belgrade, Serbia	2nd	50 m backstroke
2024	European Championships	Belgrade, Serbia	2nd	50 m freestyle
2024	Olympic Games	Paris	17th	50 m freestyle
2024	Olympic Games	Paris	13th	Mixed 4 × 100 m medley relay
