= Antonio Arroyo =

Spanish swimmer (born 1994)

Personal information
- Born: 9 May 1994 (age 32) Viladecans, Spain

Sport
- Sport: Swimming

Antonio Arroyo (born 9 May 1994) is a Spanish swimmer. He competed in the men's 1500 metre freestyle event at the 2016 Summer Olympics.
