= Dimitrios Koulouris =

Greek swimmer

Personal information
- Nationality: Greek
- Born: 22 April 1991 (age 35)
- Height: 183 cm (6 ft 0 in)
- Weight: 79 kg (174 lb)

Sport
- Sport: Swimming
- Strokes: Breaststroke
- Club: Panathinaikos

Dimitrios Koulouris (born 22 April 1991) is a Greek swimmer. He competed in the men's 200 metre breaststroke event at the 2016 Summer Olympics. He finished 35th in the heats with a time of 2:14.86. He did not qualify for the semifinals.
