= Claudia Dasca Romeu =

Spanish swimmer

Claudia Dasca
Personal information
- Full name: Claudia Dasca Romeu
- Born: 4 November 1994 (age 31) Sabadell, Spain
Medal record
Women's swimming
Representing Spain
Mediterranean Games
Silver medal – second place	2013 Mersin	4x200 m freestyle
Bronze medal – third place	2013 Mersin	400 m freestyle
Bronze medal – third place	2013 Mersin	800 m freestyle
Bronze medal – third place	2013 Mersin	400 m medley

Claudia Dasca Romeu (Note: In this Spanish name, the first or paternal surname is Dasca and the second or maternal family name is Romeu.) (born 4 November 1994 in Sabadell), also known as Claudia Dasca, is a Spanish swimmer who competes in the Women's 400m individual medley. At the 2012 Summer Olympics she finished 25th overall in the heats in the Women's 400 metre individual medley and failed to reach the final.
