= Libya at the 2013 Mediterranean Games =

- IOC code: LBA
- NOC: Libyan Olympic Committee

in Mersin
- Competitors: 18 in 1 sport
- Medals Ranked 23rd: Gold 0 Silver 0 Bronze 0 Total 0

Mediterranean Games appearances
- 1951; 1955; 1959; 1963; 1967; 1971; 1975; 1979; 1983; 1987; 1991; 1993; 1997; 2001; 2005; 2009; 2013; 2018; 2022

Libya competed at the 2013 Mediterranean Games in Mersin, Turkey from the 20th to 30 June 2013.

== Cycling ==
Athlete	Event	Time	Rank
Osama Atia	Men's road race	OTL	
Abdulati El Aghrbi	Men's road race	OTL	
Abdulati El Aghrbi	Men's time trial	44:21.40	23
Mohamed Shadi	Men's road race	OTL	
Mohamed Shadi	Men's time trial	40:12.16	22

== Football ==
=== Men's tournament ===
Team

- Sadam El Werfalli
- Abdelaziz Bin Ali
- Abdurahim Abdulkarem
- Muftah Taktak
- Almoatasembellah Musrati
- Saleh Ali Nasr
- Hamdou Elhouni
- Abdel Gawad Hameida
- Osama Al-Bedwi
- Mohamed Elmangoush
- Bashier Alkarami
- Moftah Mohamed
- Asnsi Ammar
- Rabia Alshadi
- Ayoub Adreis
- Ahmed Salem
- Firas Shelegh
- Ahmed Abdalla Ramadan

Standings

Team	Pld	W	D	L	GF	GA	GD	Pts
Tunisia	3	2	1	0	6	3	+3	7
Libya	3	1	1	1	5	5	0	4
Italy	3	1	1	1	8	5	+3	4
Macedonia	3	0	1	2	3	9	−6	1

Results

June 19, 2013
18:00

North Macedonia	2 – 2	Libya
Imeri 52'; Markovski 66'	Report	Elmangoush 70'; Elhouni 80'

Tarsus Şehir Stadı, Tarsus
Referee: Mete Kalkavan (Turkey)

June 21, 2013
21:45

Tunisia	v	Libya

Tevfik Sırrı Gür Stadium, Mersin

June 23, 2013
18:00

Libya	v	Italy

Tarsus Şehir Stadı, Tarsus

== Swimming ==
Men

Athlete	Event	Heat		Final	
Athlete	Event	Time	Rank	Time	Rank
Sofyan El Gadi	50 m backstroke	28.61	11	did not advance	
Yousuf Eltagouri	100 m breaststroke	1:16.83	18	did not advance	
Yousef Abdusalam	200 m individual medley	2:56.73	12	did not advance	
