= Greece at the 2013 Mediterranean Games =

- IOC code: GRE
- NOC: Hellenic Olympic Committee

in Mersin
- Competitors: 189
- Medals Ranked 6th: Gold 15 Silver 18 Bronze 26 Total 59

Mediterranean Games appearances (overview)
- 1951; 1955; 1959; 1963; 1967; 1971; 1975; 1979; 1983; 1987; 1991; 1993; 1997; 2001; 2005; 2009; 2013; 2018; 2022

Greece competed at the 2013 Mediterranean Games in Mersin, Turkey from 20 to 30 June 2013. The team ended up in the 6th place of the Games.

== Athletics ==
=== Men ===
Athlete	Event	Final	
Athlete	Event	Result	Rank
Lykourgos-Stefanos Tsakonas	200 metres	20.45	1st place, gold medalist(s)
Konstantinos Douvalidis	100 metres hurdles	13.45	1st place, gold medalist(s)
Konstadinos Baniotis	High jump	2.34	1st place, gold medalist(s)
Louis Tsatoumas	Long jump	8.14	1st place, gold medalist(s)
Georgios Tsakonas	Long jump	7.97	2nd place, silver medalist(s)
Dimitrios Tsiamis	Triple jump	17.00	2nd place, silver medalist(s)
Eythymios Stergioulis; Christos Kalamaras; Emmanuil Paterakis; Panagiotis Andreadis	4x100 metres relay	40.22	2nd place, silver medalist(s)
Spyros Lebesis	Javelin throw	78.53	3rd place, bronze medalist(s)
Dimitrios Gravalos; Petros Kyriakidis; Periklis Iakovakis; Konstantinos Nakopoulos	4x400 metres relay	3.07.36	3rd place, bronze medalist(s)

=== Women ===
Athlete	Event	Final	
Athlete	Event	Result	Rank
Athanasia Perra	Triple jump	14.48	1st place, gold medalist(s)
Stella-Iro Ledaki	Pole vault	4.50	1st place, gold medalist(s)
Sofia Ifantidou	Heptathlon	5752	2nd place, silver medalist(s)
Antonia Stergiou	High jump	1.90	3rd place, bronze medalist(s)
Chrysoula Anagnostopoulou	Discus throw	55.01	3rd place, bronze medalist(s)
Antigoni Drisbioti	20 km walk	1.41.53	3rd place, bronze medalist(s)
Maria Gatou; Agni Derveni; Olympia Petsoudi; Grigoria Kermida	4x100 metres relay	45.12	3rd place, bronze medalist(s)

== Gymnastics ==
Athlete	Event	
Athlete	Event	Rank
Eleftherios Kosmidis	Floor	1st place, gold medalist(s)
Eleftherios Petrounias	Rings	1st place, gold medalist(s)
Vasiliki Millousi	Balance beam	2nd place, silver medalist(s)
Varvara Filiou	Rhythmic individual all-around	2nd place, silver medalist(s)

== Handball ==
=== Men's tournament ===
A team of 16 athletes > 10th place

Preliminary round

Group B
Team	Pld	W	D	L	GF	GA	GD	Pts
Croatia	4	3	0	1	120	109	+11	6
Egypt	4	3	0	1	111	94	+17	6
Slovenia	4	2	1	1	134	117	+17	5
Tunisia	4	1	1	2	107	111	−4	3
Greece	4	0	0	4	80	121	−41	0

== Rowing ==
Athlete	Event	Semifinals		Final	
Athlete	Event	Time	Rank	Time	Rank
Aikaterini Nikolaidou	Lightweight single skulls				1st place, gold medalist(s)
Spyridon Giannaros; Eleftherios Konsolas	Lightweight double sculls				1st place, gold medalist(s)
Dionisis Angelopoulos	Single sculls				2nd place, silver medalist(s)
Panagiotis Magdanis	Single sculls				3rd place, bronze medalist(s)

== Sailing ==
Men

Athlete	Event	Race											Net points	Final rank
Athlete	Event	1	2	3	4	5	6	7	8	9	10	M*	Net points	Final rank
Nikolaos Chrysos	Laser													11th
Antonios Bougiouris	Laser													5th
Panagiotis Mantis; Pavlos Kagialis	470													2nd place, silver medalist(s)
Ioannis Orfanos; Vasileios Papoutsoglou	470													5th

Women

Athlete	Event	Race											Net points	Final rank
Athlete	Event	1	2	3	4	5	6	7	8	9	10	M*	Net points	Final rank
Antonia Psoma	Laser Radial													8th
Maria Vlachou	Laser Radial													10th
Virginia Kravarioti; Sofia Papadopoulou	470													4th
Despoina Stefanoudaki; Rafailina Klonaridou	470													7th

== Swimming ==
Men

Athlete	Event	Heat		Final	
Athlete	Event	Time	Rank	Time	Rank
Panagiotis Samilidis	200 m breaststroke				1st place, gold medalist(s)
Kristian Golomeev	50 m freestyle	22.67	3 Q	22.35	3rd place, bronze medalist(s)
Antonios Fokaidis	1500 m freestyle	—N/a		15:30.49	5th
Dimitrios Koulouris	100 m breaststroke	1:03.02	6 Q	1:02.85	6th
Panagiotis Samilidis	100 m breaststroke	1:02.31	3 Q	1:01.71	3rd place, bronze medalist(s)
Andreas Vazaios	200 m individual medley	2:05.11	5 Q	2:00.74	3rd place, bronze medalist(s)

Women

Athlete	Event	Heat		Final	
Athlete	Event	Time	Rank	Time	Rank
Theodora Drakou	100 m freestyle			55.63	1st place, gold medalist(s)
Theodora Giareni	400 m freestyle	4:22.83	8 Q	4:22.73	7th
Marianna Lymperta	400 m freestyle	4:23.19	9	Did not advance	
Theodora Drakou	50 m backstroke	28.87	1 Q	28.66	2nd place, silver medalist(s)
Aspasia Petradaki	50 m backstroke	30.18	11	Did not advance	
Theodora Drakou	100 m backstroke	1:03.36	3 Q	1:01.75	2nd place, silver medalist(s)
Aspasia Petradaki	100 m backstroke	1:03.68	6 Q	1:04.15	7
Maria Georgia Michalaka	100 m breaststroke	1:10.94	5 Q	1:10.46	6th
Konstantina Papailia	100 m breaststroke	DNS		Did not advance	
Afroditi Giareni	200 m individual medley	DNS		Did not advance	
Konstantina Papailia	200 m individual medley	2:21.34	8 Q	2:20.12	7th
Theodora Drakou; Theodora Giareni; Kristel Vourna; Stavroula Karantakou	4 × 100 m freestyle relay				2nd place, silver medalist(s)

== Taekwondo ==
Athlete	Event	Round of 16	Quarterfinals	Semifinals	Repechage 1	Repechage 2	Final / BM	
Athlete	Event	Opposition Result	Opposition Result	Opposition Result	Opposition Result	Opposition Result	Opposition Result	Rank
Ioanna Koutsou	Women's −49 kg	Benes (ESP); L 3–4	Did not advance					
Alexandros Nikolaidis	Men's +80 kg		Trablesi (TUN); W 3–0	Babić (SRB); W w/o			Sarı (TUR); L 0–5	2nd place, silver medalist(s)

== Volleyball ==
=== Indoor ===
==== Women's tournament ====
Standings

Pos	Team	Pld	W	L	Pts	SW	SL	SR	SPW	SPL	SPR
1	Turkey	2	2	0	6	6	1	6.000	169	121	1.397
2	Slovenia	2	1	1	3	3	3	1.000	128	134	0.955
3	Greece	2	0	2	0	1	6	0.167	127	169	0.751

Results

Date	Time		Score		Set 1	Set 2	Set 3	Set 4	Set 5	Total	Report
22-Jun	15:30	Slovenia	–	Greece							
26-Jun	18:00	Greece	1–3	Turkey							

== Water polo ==
=== Men's tournament ===
Team

- Alexandros Evgenios Gounas
- Angelos Vlachopoulos
- Christodoulos Kolomvos
- Christos Afroudakis
- Emmanouil Mylonakis
- Evangelos Delakas
- Ioannis Fountoulis
- Konstantinos Galanidis
- Konstantinos Genidounias
- Konstantinos Gouvis
- Konstantinos Mourikis
- Konstantinos Tsalkanis
- Kyriakos Pontikeas

Standings

Team	Pld	W	D	L	GF	GA	GD	Pts
Greece	3	3	0	0	32	14	+18	6
Italy	3	2	0	1	26	19	+7	4
France	3	1	0	2	19	24	−5	2
Serbia	3	0	0	3	11	31	−20	0

Results

June 19, 2013; 16:30	Report	Greece	12–3	Serbia	Çiftlikköy Campus Swimming Pool, Mersin; Referees: Matache (ROU) and Kokaragac (TUR)
June 19, 2013; 16:30	Report	Score by quarters: 3 – 1, 1 – 1, 4 – 0, 4 – 1			Çiftlikköy Campus Swimming Pool, Mersin; Referees: Matache (ROU) and Kokaragac (TUR)
June 19, 2013; 16:30	Report	Fountoulis 4	Goals	3 players, 1	Çiftlikköy Campus Swimming Pool, Mersin; Referees: Matache (ROU) and Kokaragac (TUR)

June 21, 2013; 16:30	Greece	12–6	France	Çiftlikköy Campus Swimming Pool, Mersin

June 22, 2013; 16:30	Greece	8–5	Italy	Çiftlikköy Campus Swimming Pool, Mersin

Semi Final

Greece	7–10	Spain	Çiftlikköy Campus Swimming Pool, Mersin

Third-fourth place final

June 25, 2013; 18:00	Greece	9–8	Italy	Çiftlikköy Campus Swimming Pool, Mersin
June 25, 2013; 18:00	Score by quarters: 1-3, 3-3, 4-1, 1-1			Çiftlikköy Campus Swimming Pool, Mersin

Team	Rank
Greece	(bronze) Third place

== Weightlifting ==
Athlete	Event		
Athlete	Event		Rank
David Kavelasvili	105 kg	Snatch; Clean & jerk	1st place, gold medalist(s)
Theodoros Iakovidis	85 kg	Snatch; Clean & jerk	3rd place, bronze medalist(s)

== Wrestling ==
Athlete	Event	
Athlete	Event	Rank
Maria Prevolaraki	Freestyle 55 kg	1st place, gold medalist(s)
Andreas Triantafyllidis	Freestyle 66 kg	2nd place, silver medalist(s)
Theoharis Kalanidis	Freestyle 55 kg	3rd place, bronze medalist(s)
Timofei Xenidis	Freestyle 84 kg	3rd place, bronze medalist(s)
Christos Nyfadopoulos	Freestyle 120 kg	3rd place, bronze medalist(s)
Evdoxia Pavlidou	Freestyle 51 kg	3rd place, bronze medalist(s)
Agoro Papavasiliou	Freestyle 63 kg	3rd place, bronze medalist(s)
