= France at the 2013 Mediterranean Games =

- IOC code: FRA
- NOC: French Olympic Committee

in Mersin
- Competitors: 37 in 2 sports
- Medals Ranked 3rd: Gold 25 Silver 25 Bronze 45 Total 95

Mediterranean Games appearances (overview)
- 1951; 1955; 1959; 1963; 1967; 1971; 1975; 1979; 1983; 1987; 1991; 1993; 1997; 2001; 2005; 2009; 2013; 2018; 2022; 2026

France competed at the 2013 Mediterranean Games in Mersin, Turkey from 20 to 30 June 2013.

== Sailing ==
Men

Athlete	Event	Race											Net points	Final rank
Athlete	Event	1	2	3	4	5	6	7	8	9	10	M*	Net points	Final rank
Jean-Baptiste Bernaz	Laser	4	1	2	2	3	1	4	4	~~6~~	2		23	3rd place, bronze medalist(s)
Maxime Mazard	Laser	13	3	11	10	8	3	~~24~~	9	17	6		80	7
Sofian Bouvet; Jeremie Mion	470	8	~~9~~	5	7	4	2	5	2	1	1	2	37	4
Pierre Leboucher; Nicolas Le Berre	470	6	4	~~10~~	8	6	5	7	5	3	3	3	50	6

Women

Athlete	Event	Race											Net points	Final rank
Athlete	Event	1	2	3	4	5	6	7	8	9	10	M*	Net points	Final rank
Marie Bolou	Laser Radial	~~9~~	4	9	9	7	6	3	4	5	2	4	53	6
Mathilde De Kerangat	Laser Radial	1	3	11	8	~~14~~	2	5	5	1	3	5	44	4
Camille Lecointre; Mathilde Géron	470	4	1	2	1	2	3	1	2	~~5~~	2	2	20	1st place, gold medalist(s)

== Swimming ==
Men

Athlete	Event	Heat		Final	
Athlete	Event	Time	Rank	Time	Rank
Simon Guerin	400 m freestyle	3:55.37	5	3:52.68	3rd place, bronze medalist(s)
Lucas Vigoretto	400 m freestyle	3:58.19	12	did not advance	
Eric Ress	50 m backstroke	26.40	7	26.12	6
William Debourges	100 m breaststroke	1:03.81	9	did not advance	
Patrick Perisser	100 m breaststroke	1:03.44	8	1:03.09	7
Ganesh Pedurand	200 m individual medley	2:03.96	3	2:02.18	5

Women

Athlete	Event	Heat		Final	
Athlete	Event	Time	Rank	Time	Rank
Mathilde Cini	50 m backstroke	29.45	4	29.09	5
Béryl Gastaldello	50 m backstroke	29.70	6	28.92	4
Fanny Deberghes	100 m breaststroke	1:12.06	8	1:12.44	8
Coralie Dobral	100 m breaststroke	1:10.43	4	1:10.00	6
Fantine Lesaffre	200 m individual medley	2:19.06	4	2:17.27	5
Anna Santamans; Lauriane Haag; Mathilde Cini; Béryl Gastaldello	4 × 100 m freestyle relay	3:51.06	2	3:42.37	1st place, gold medalist(s)
Fantine Lesaffre*; Fanny Deberghes*; Lauriane Haag*; Béryl Gastaldello; Coralie Dobral; Mathilde Cini; Anna Santamans	4 × 100 m medley relay	4:19.79	3	4:08.88	3rd place, bronze medalist(s)

== Volleyball ==
=== Men's tournament ===
Preliminary round

Pos	Team	Pld	W	L	Pts	SW	SL	SR	SPW	SPL	SPR
1	France	2	1	1	4	5	4	1.250	214	215	0.995
2	Turkey	2	1	1	3	4	4	1.000	199	190	1.047
3	Egypt	2	1	1	2	4	5	0.800	193	201	0.960

Date	Time		Score		Set 1	Set 2	Set 3	Set 4	Set 5	Total	Report
21-Jun	13:00	Egypt	3–2	France	24–26	25–23	23–25	25–18	15–13	112–105	
25-Jun	18:00	France	3–1	Turkey	22–25	25–22	25–21	37–35		109–103	

Semifinal

Date	Time		Score		Set 1	Set 2	Set 3	Set 4	Set 5	Total	Report
27-Jun	18:00	France	1–3	Tunisia	20–25	25–17	24–26	20–25		89–93	

Bronze medal match

Date	Time		Score		Set 1	Set 2	Set 3	Set 4	Set 5	Total	Report
29-Jun	15:00	Turkey	2–3	France	21–25	25–17	25–18	21–25	12–15	104–100	

=== Women's tournament ===
Preliminary round

Pos	Team	Pld	W	L	Pts	SW	SL	SR	SPW	SPL	SPR
1	Italy	2	2	0	6	6	0	MAX	155	108	1.435
2	Croatia	2	1	1	2	3	5	0.600	154	177	0.870
3	France	2	0	2	1	2	6	0.333	155	179	0.866

Date	Time		Score		Set 1	Set 2	Set 3	Set 4	Set 5	Total	Report
22-Jun	18:00	France	2–3	Croatia	25–21	23–25	17–25	25–13	12–15	102–99	
26-Jun	15:30	Italy	3–0	France	25–12	30–28	25-13			80–40	

Fifth place match

Date	Time		Score		Set 1	Set 2	Set 3	Set 4	Set 5	Total	Report
28-Jun	12:30	Greece	3–1	France	28–26	21–25	25–20	25–23		99–94	

== Water polo ==
=== Men's tournament ===
Team

- Alexandre Camarasa
- Arnaud Jablonski
- Enzo Khasz
- Jonathan Moriame
- Loris Jeleff
- Manuel Laversanne
- Mathieu Peisson
- Mehdi Marzouki
- Michael Bodegas
- Raphael Pirat
- Remi Garsau
- Remi Saudadier
- Thibaut Simon

Preliminary round

Team	Pld	W	D	L	GF	GA	GD	Pts
Greece	3	3	0	0	32	14	+18	6
Italy	3	2	0	1	26	19	+7	4
France	3	1	0	2	19	24	−5	2
Serbia	3	0	0	3	11	31	−20	0

June 19, 2013; 18:00	Report	Italy	9–6	France	Çiftlikköy Campus Swimming Pool, Mersin; Referees: Vlasic (CRO) and Colominas (ESP)
June 19, 2013; 18:00	Report	Score by quarters: 1 – 0, 2 – 2, 3 – 1, 3 – 3			Çiftlikköy Campus Swimming Pool, Mersin; Referees: Vlasic (CRO) and Colominas (ESP)
June 19, 2013; 18:00	Report	3 players, 2	Goals	Marzouki, Camarasa 2	Çiftlikköy Campus Swimming Pool, Mersin; Referees: Vlasic (CRO) and Colominas (ESP)

June 21, 2013; 16:30	Report	Greece	12–6	France	Çiftlikköy Campus Swimming Pool, Mersin; Referees: Gideon (NED) and Vlasic (CRO)
June 21, 2013; 16:30	Report	Score by quarters: 1–1, 3–1, 4–1, 4–2			Çiftlikköy Campus Swimming Pool, Mersin; Referees: Gideon (NED) and Vlasic (CRO)
June 21, 2013; 16:30	Report	Fountoulis 4	Goals	Simon 4	Çiftlikköy Campus Swimming Pool, Mersin; Referees: Gideon (NED) and Vlasic (CRO)

June 22, 2013; 18:00	Report	France	7–3	Serbia	Çiftlikköy Campus Swimming Pool, Mersin; Referees: Kokaragac (TUR) and Reemnet (NED)
June 22, 2013; 18:00	Report	Score by quarters: 1–1, 0–2, 3–0, 3–0			Çiftlikköy Campus Swimming Pool, Mersin; Referees: Kokaragac (TUR) and Reemnet (NED)
June 22, 2013; 18:00	Report	Simon 3	Goals	3 players, 1	Çiftlikköy Campus Swimming Pool, Mersin; Referees: Kokaragac (TUR) and Reemnet (NED)

Fifth place match

June 25, 2013; 16:30	Report	Serbia	3–6	France	Çiftlikköy Campus Swimming Pool, Mersin; Referees: Reemnnet (NED) and Vlasic (CRO)
June 25, 2013; 16:30	Report	Score by quarters: 0–0, 0–1, 2–3, 1–3			Çiftlikköy Campus Swimming Pool, Mersin; Referees: Reemnnet (NED) and Vlasic (CRO)
June 25, 2013; 16:30	Report	Rasovic 2	Goals	Khasz 2	Çiftlikköy Campus Swimming Pool, Mersin; Referees: Reemnnet (NED) and Vlasic (CRO)
