= Mersin Olympic Swimming Pool =

Swimming pool complex in Mersin, Turkey

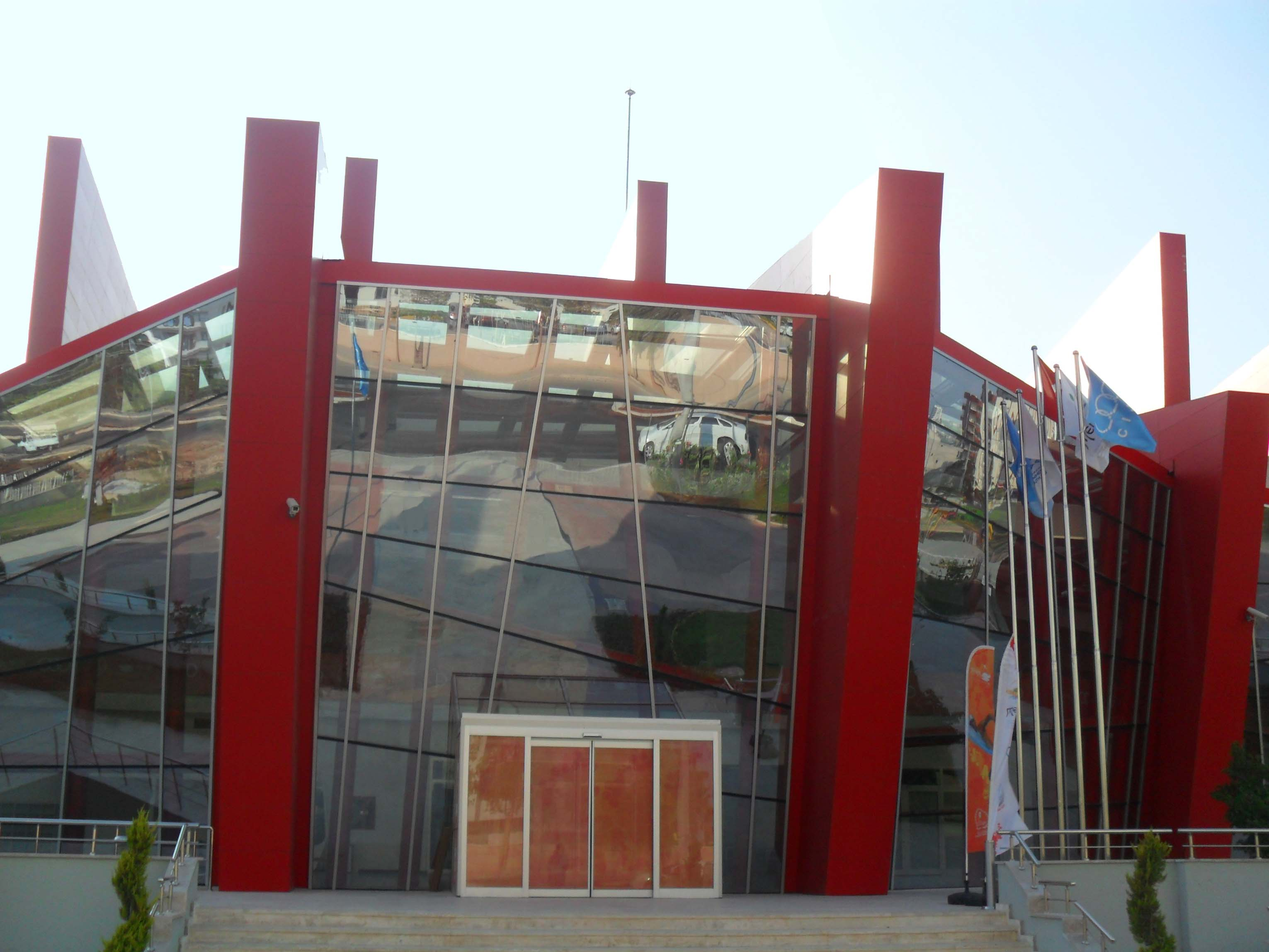
- Interactive map of Mersin Olympic Swimming Pool
- Location: 15.cad. Yenişehir, Mersin
- Coordinates: 36°48′40″N 34°34′40″E
- Owner: Ministry of Youth and Sports (Turkey)
- Capacity: 1,000

Construction
- Opened: 2013

Mersin Olympic Swimming Pool is a complex of swimming pools in Mersin, Turkey.

== Geography ==
The complex is at 36°48′40″N 34°34′40″E. It is on 2869 street about 200 metres (660 ft) east of İsmet İnönü Boulevard and about 1 kilometre (0.62 mi) west of Müftü River. Both Macit Özcan Sports Complex and Nevin Yanıt Athletics Complex are situated within 1 kilometre (0.62 mi) of the pool complex.

== Description ==
The complex was built on a 12,500 square metres (135,000 sq ft) ground area. There are three pools in the complex: an Olympic-size swimming pool with a spectator capacity of 1000 and two smaller pools for practice.

== 2013 Mediterranean Games ==
At the 2013 Mediterranean Games, the pool hosted swimming and paralympics swimming events between 21 and 25 June 2013.
