= Turkey at the 2013 Mediterranean Games =

- IOC code: TUR
- NOC: Turkish Olympic Committee

in Mersin
- Flag bearer: Rıza Kayaalp
- Medals Ranked 2nd: Gold 47 Silver 43 Bronze 35 Total 125

Mediterranean Games appearances (overview)
- 1951; 1955; 1959; 1963; 1967; 1971; 1975; 1979; 1983; 1987; 1991; 1993; 1997; 2001; 2005; 2009; 2013; 2018; 2022

Turkey participated as the host nation in the 2013 Mediterranean Games held in Mersin, Turkey from 20 to 30 June 2013.

== Medals ==
Medal	Athlete / Team	Sport	Event	Date
Gold	Adem Kılıççı	Boxing	Men's middleweight (75 kg)	26 June
Gold	Ahmet Li, Bora Vang	Table tennis	Men's doubles	29 June
Gold	Aylin Daşdelen	Weightlifting	Women's 58 kg snatch	22 June
Gold	Aylin Daşdelen	Weightlifting	Women's 58 kg clean & jerk	22 June
Gold	Ayşegül Çoban	Weightlifting	Women's 53 kg clean & jerk	22 June
Gold	Bora Vang; Ahmet Li	Table tennis	Men's doubles	29 June
Gold	Burcu Yüksel	Athletics	Women's high jump	29 June
Gold	Bünyamin Sezer	Weightlifting	Men's 62 kg snatch	21 June
Gold	Çağla Büyükakçay	Tennis	Women's singles	29 June
Gold	Çağla Büyükakçay; Pemra Özgen	Tennis	Women's doubles	28 June
Gold	Deniz Demir	Bocce	Women's raffa singles	29 June
Gold	Ebru Şahin	Judo	Women's 48 kg	21 June
Gold	Elif Jale Yeşilırmak	Wrestling	Women's freestyle 63 kg	24 June
Gold	Emine Şensoy	Weightlifting	Women's 53 kg snatch	22 June
Gold	Emrah Kuş	Wrestling	Men's Greco-Roman 74 kg	23 June
Gold	Erhan Bakır	Wrestling	Men's freestyle 60 kg	26 June
Gold	Fatih Avan	Athletics	Men's javelin throw	26 June
Gold	Hafize Şahin	Wrestling	Women's freestyle 59 kg	24 June
Gold	Hasan Vanlıoğlu	Judo	Men's 73 kg	22 June
Gold	Hafsa Şeyda Burucu	Karate	Women's 68 kg	29 June
Gold	İlham Tanui Özbilen	Athletics	Men's 800 m	29 June
Gold	İlham Tanui Özbilen	Athletics	Men's 1500 m	27 June
Gold	Mehmet Arık	Wrestling	Men's Greco-Roman 60 kg	23 June
Gold	Meltem Hocaoğlu	Karate	Women's +68 kg	29 June
Gold	Melek Hu	Table tennis	Women's singles	27 June
Gold	Murat Giginoğlu; Selçuk Şekerci	Beach volleyball	Men's tournament	28 June
Gold	Mustafa Kaya	Wrestling	Men's freestyle 66 kg	25 June
Gold	Neslihan Yiğit	Badminton	Women's singles	30 June
Gold	Neslihan Yiğit; Özge Bayrak	Badminton	Women's doubles	29 June
Gold	Nur Tatar	Taekwondo	Women's 67 kg	22 June
Gold	Ömer Kemaloğlu	Karate	Men's 67 kg	28 June
Gold	Polat Kemboi Arıkan	Athletics	Men's 10,000 m	27 June
Gold	Rıza Kayaalp	Wrestling	Men's Greco-Roman 120 kg	22 June
Gold	Rıza Yıldırım	Wrestling	Men's freestyle 96 kg	26 June
Gold	Selçuk Çebi	Wrestling	Men's Greco-Roman 84 kg	22 June
Gold	Serap Özçelik	Karate	Women's 50 kg	28 June
Gold	Serdar Böke	Wrestling	Men's freestyle 84 kg	25 June
Gold	Serkan Yağcı	Karate	Men's 75 kg	28 June
Gold	Sibel Şimşek	Weightlifting	Women's 63 kg snatch	23 June
Gold	Soner Demirtaş	Wrestling	Men's freestyle 74 kg	26 June
Gold	Taha Akgül	Wrestling	Men's freestyle 120 kg	25 June
Gold	Turkey men's national basketball team: Barış Ermiş; Barış Hersek; Birkan Batuk; Melih Mahmutoğlu; Cemal Nalga; Deniz Kılıçlı; Doğuş Balbay; Emre Bayav; İzzet Türkyılmaz; Can Mutaf; Oğuz Savaş; Serhat Çetin	Basketball	Men's tournament	25 June
Gold	Tuba Yenen	Karate	Women's 55 kg	28 June
Gold	Ümit Şamiloğlu	Artistic gymnastics	Men's horizontal bar	24 June
Gold	Yasemin Adar	Wrestling	Women's freestyle 72 kg	24 June
Gold	Yusuf Dikeç	Shooting	Men's 50 m pistol	25 June
Silver	Ali Eren Demirezen	Boxing	Men's super heavyweight	26 June
Silver	Ayşegül Çoban	Weightlifting	Women's 53 kg snatch	22 June
Silver	Bahar Erşeker	Karate	Women's 61 kg	28 June
Silver	Belkıs Zehra Kaya	Judo	Women's +78 kg	23 June
Silver	Bora Vang	Table tennis	Men's singles	27 June
Silver	Bünyamin Sezer	Weightlifting	Men's 62 kg clean & jerk	21 June
Silver	Cenk İldem	Wrestling	Men's Greco-Roman 96 kg	23 June
Silver	Deniz Demir; Benay Gündüz	Bocce	Women's raffa doubles	27 June
Silver	Dilara Buse Günaydın	Swimming	Women's 50 m breaststroke	25 June
Silver	Ercüment Olgundeniz	Athletics	Men's discus throw	27 June
Silver	Elvan Abeylegesse	Athletics	Women's 10,000 m	26 June
Silver	Emine Şensoy	Weightlifting	Women's 53 kg clean & jerk	22 June
Silver	Enes Erkan	Karate	Men's +84 kg	29 June
Silver	Emre Arslan Yiğit; Hüseyin Oruç	Badminton	Men's doubles	29 June
Silver	Fatih Keleş	Boxing	Men's light welterweight	26 June
Silver	Ferhat Pehlivan	Boxing	Men's light flyweight	26 June
Silver	Halil İbrahim Öztürk	Shooting	Men's 10 m air rifle	24 June
Silver	Hatice İlgün	Taekwondo	Women's 57 kg	21 June
Silver	Hüseyin Kandemir	Rowing	Men's lightweight single sculls	23 June
Silver	İbrahim Çolak	Artistic gymnastics	Men's rings	24 June
Silver	Kemal Arda Gürdal	Swimming	Men's 100 m freestyle	23 June
Silver	Marsel İlhan	Tennis	Men's singles	29 June
Silver	Mehmet Güzel; Buğrahan Kocabeyoğlu; Halit Kılıç; Yavuz Can	Athletics	Men's 4 × 400 m relay	29 June
Silver	Nezir Sağır	Weightlifting	Men's 85 kg clean & jerk	24 June
Silver	Özge Bayrak	Badminton	Women's singles	30 June
Silver	Polat Kemboi Arıkan	Athletics	Men's 10,000 m	27 June
Silver	Ramil Guliyev	Athletics	Men's 100 m	27 June
Silver	Ramil Guliyev	Athletics	Men's 200 m	26 June
Silver	Rukiye Yıldırım	Taekwondo	Women's 49 kg	21 June
Silver	Saliha Özyurt; Birsen Engin; Sema Apak; Derya Yıldırım	Athletics	Women's 4 × 400 m relay	29 June
Silver	Seda Geridönmez	Bocce	Women's volo progressive throw	28 June
Silver	Selim Kakış, Kaan Özgönenç	Sailing	Men's 470	27 June
Silver	Serap Özçelik	Karate	Women's 50 kg	28 June
Silver	Sibel Şimşek	Weightlifting	Women's 63 kg clean & jerk	23 June
Silver	Sümeyye Sezer	Wrestling	Women's freestyle 48 kg	24 June
Silver	Tarık Langat Akdağ	Athletics	Men's 3000 m steeplechase	28 June
Silver	Turkey women's national volleyball team: Esra Gümüş Kırıcı; Gözde Sonsırma; Seda Tokatlıoğlu; Güldeniz Önal; Naz Aydemir; Özge Kırdar Çemberci; Neslihan Demir; Polen Uslupehlivan; Büşra Cansu; Bahar Toksoy; Ergül Avcı; Gizem Güreşen	Volleyball	Women's tournament	30 June
Silver	Turkey national under-19 football team: Cantuğ Temel; Ozan Tufan; Abdülkerim Bardakcı; Muhammed Serdar Yazıcı; Süheyl Çetin; Kubilay Aktaş; İsmail Güven; Gökhan Sazdağı; Metin Sevinç; Kubilay Dursun Sönmez; İbrahim Coşkun; Berk İsmail Ünsal; Recep Niyaz; Okan Aydın; Emre Selen; Atabey Çiçek; Sedat Yüce; Haydar Deniz	Football	Men's tournament	27 June
Silver	Ümit Şamiloğlu	Artistic gymnastics	Men's vault	24 June
Bronze	Ahmet Li	Table tennis	Men's singles	27 June
Bronze	Ali Sarı	Taekwondo	Men's +80 kg	21 June
Bronze	Ayşe Saadet Arca	Judo	Women's 52 kg	21 June
Bronze	Aylin Daşdelen	Weightlifting	Women's 58 kg overall	22 June
Bronze	Avni Yıldırım	Boxing	Men's light heavyweight	25 June
Bronze	Bahar Büker	Judo	Women's 63 kg	22 June
Bronze	Belkıs Zehra Kaya	Judo	Women's +78 kg	23 June
Bronze	Burcu Dolunay	Swimming	Women's 50 m freestyle	22 June
Bronze	Burcu Dolunay; Halime Zülal Zeren; Gizem Bozkurt; Esra Kübra Kaçmaz	Swimming	Women's 4 x 100 m freestyle relay	21 June
Bronze	Çağrıbey Yıldırım; Serhat Kadir Yılmaz	Canoeing	Men's K2 200 m	29 June
Bronze	Deniz Demir; Benay Gündüz	Bocce	Women's raffa doubles	27 June
Bronze	Dilara Buse Günaydın	Swimming	Women's 100 m breaststroke	21 June
Bronze	Dilara Buse Günaydın	Swimming	Women's 200 m breaststroke	23 June
Bronze	Elvan Abeylegesse	Athletics	Women's 10,000 m	26 June
Bronze	Erdal İnanlı	Boxing	Men's flyweight	25 June
Bronze	Feyyaz Yazıcı	Judo	Men's 100 kg	23 June
Bronze	Figen Kaya	Weightlifting	Women's 75 kg clean & jerk	25 June
Bronze	Ferhat Arıcan	Artistic gymnastics	Men's parallel bars	24 June
Bronze	Fırat Pozan	Taekwondo	Men's 58 kg	22 June
Bronze	Gülcan Mıngır	Athletics	Women's 3000 m steeplechase	28 June
Bronze	Halime Zülal Zeren	Swimming	Women's 200 m backstroke	22 June
Bronze	İrem Karamete	Fencing	Women's foil	23 June
Bronze	İsmail Aslan; Ferhat Altunkalem; İzzet Safer; Umutcan Emektaş	Athletics	Men's 4 x 100 m relay	28 June
Bronze	Kaşif Şakiroğlu	Wrestling	Men's freestyle 97 kg	26 June
Bronze	Kemal Arda Gürdal; Güven Duvan; Demir Atasoy; Kaan Türker Ayar	Swimming	Men's 4 × 100 m medley relay	25 June
Bronze	Kemal Arda Gürdal; Nezir Karap; Furkan Deniz Maraşlı; Doğa Çelik	Swimming	Men's 4 × 200 m freestyle relay	23 June
Bronze	Mehmet Topçakan	Boxing	Men's bantamweight	24 June
Bronze	Muhyettin Uzun	Wrestling	Men's freestyle 54 kg	25 June
Bronze	Nimet Karakuş	Athletics	Women's 200 m	26 June
Bronze	Okay Arpa	Karate	Men's openweight	29 June
Bronze	Ömer Çubukçu	Wrestling	Men's freestyle 63 kg	26 June
Bronze	Rasim Reis	Cycling	Men's individual time trial	25 June
Bronze	Selahattin Güngör	Wrestling	Men's Greco-Roman 69 kg	25 June
Bronze	Serpil Koçak	Athletics	Women's heptathlon	29 June
Bronze	Servet Tazegül	Taekwondo	Men's 68 kg	23 June
Bronze	Sibel Şimşek	Weightlifting	Women's 63 kg overall	23 June
Bronze	Tuğba Koyuncu	Athletics	Women's 800 m	29 June
Bronze	Tuğba Koyuncu	Athletics	Women's 1500 m	26 June
Bronze	Turkey men's national handball team	Handball	Men's tournament	30 June
Bronze	Turkey men's national volleyball team	Volleyball	Men's tournament	30 June
Bronze	Ümmü Kiraz	Athletics	Women's half marathon	29 June
Bronze	Yavuz İlnam	Shooting	Men's double trap	24 June
Bronze	Yunus Emre Güngör	Bocce	Men's raffa singles	29 June

== Medal table ==
Sport	Gold	Silver	Bronze	Total
Archery	0	0	0	0
Athletics	5	7	6	18
Badminton	2	2	0	4
Basketball	1	0	0	1
Beach volleyball	1	0	0	1
Bocce	1	2	1	4
Boxing	1	4	3	8
Canoeing	0	0	1	1
Cycling	0	0	1	1
Fencing	0	0	1	1
Football	0	1	0	1
Gymnastics, artistic	1	1	1	3
Gymnastics, rhythmic	0	0	0	0
Handball	0	0	1	1
Judo	2	1	4	7
Karate	6	2	0	8
Rowing	0	2	0	2
Sailing	0	0	1	1
Shooting	1	2	1	4
Swimming	0	3	7	10
Table tennis	2	1	1	4
Taekwondo	2	2	4	8
Tennis	2	1	0	3
Volleyball	0	1	0	1
Water polo	0	0	0	0
Weightlifting	6	7	1	14
Wrestling	14	4	1	19
Total	47	43	36	126

== Archery ==
=== Men ===
Athlete	Event	1/32 Elimination	1/16 Elimination	1/8 Elimination	Quarterfinal	Semifinal	Final/Bronze medal	Rank
Cevdet Dincer Demiral	Individual	BYE	(Serbia) Nikola Prodanovic; W 6–2	(France) Thomas Koenig; W 6–4	(Italy) Michele Frangilli; L 3–7	–	–	
Yagiz Yilmaz	Individual	BYE	(Cyprus) Mimis El Helali; W 6–2	(Slovenia) Jaka Komocar; W 7–3	(Serbia) Luka Grozdanovic; W 6–4	(Spain) Antonio Fernandez; T 4–4	(Italy) Alberto Alfonso Zagami; L 4–6	4
Fatih Bozlar	Individual	BYE	(Greece) Michail Papavasileiou; W 6–0	(Spain) Elias Miguel Cuesta Cobo; L 3–7	–	–	–	
Team	Team			BYE	(France); L 208–212	–	–	

=== Women ===
Athlete	Event	1/32 Elimination	1/16 Elimination	1/8 Elimination	Quarterfinal	Semifinal	Final/Bronze medal	Rank
Begul Lokluoglu	Individual		BYE	(Spain) Elena M. Fernandez Gonzales; W 6–0	(Egypt) Amira Mansour; W 6–4	(Spain) Mirene Etxeberria; L 0–4	(Italy) Natalia Valeeva; T 5-5L 8–9	4
Elcin Baykal Oncu	Individual		(Slovenia) Brina Bozic; L 2–6	–	–	–	–	
Aybuke Aktuna	Individual		BYE	(Cyprus) Elena Mouskou; L 2–6	–	–	–	
Team	Team	–	–	–	(Greece); L 184–194	–	–	

== Athletics ==
Men's

=== Men ===
Athlete	Event	Heat		Final	
Athlete	Event	Time	Rank	Time	Rank
Ramil Guliyev	100 metres	10.43 SB	4	10.23 SB	2nd place, silver medalist(s)
Ramil Guliyev	200 metres	20.97	4	20.46 SB	2nd place, silver medalist(s)
Yavuz Can	400 metres	46.53	2	46.70	6
Halit Kilic	400 metres	48.15	5		DNQ
Ilham Tanui Ozbilen	800 metres	1:46.50	1	1:44.00 GR	1st place, gold medalist(s)
Levent Ates	800 metres	1:50.17	6		DNQ
Ilham Tanui Ozbilen	1500 metres			3:35.09 SB	1st place, gold medalist(s)
Levent Ates	1500 metres			3:41.43 PB	10
Kemal Koyuncu	5000 metres			14:29.75	5
Halil Akkas	5000 metres				DNS
Polat Kemboi Arıkan	10000 metres			28:17.26	1st place, gold medalist(s)
Halil Akkas	10000 metres				DNF
Mustafa Gunes	110 metres hurdles	14.23	5	14.19	7
Enis Unsal	400 metres hurdles	52.71	5	52.27	8
Tuncay Örs	400 metres hurdles	54.82	4		DNQ
Tarik Langat Akdag	3000 metres steeplechase			8:20.08 SB	2nd place, silver medalist(s)
Hakan Duvar	3000 metres steeplechase			8:58.40	10
Ismail Aslan	4×100 metres relay			42.82	3rd place, bronze medalist(s)
Mehmet Güzel	4×400 metres relay			3:05.28 SB	2nd place, silver medalist(s)
Muzaffer Bayram	Half marathon			1:09:40	4
Mehmet Caglayan	Half marathon			1:11:54	8
Hasan Pak	Half marathon				DNF

Athlete	Event	#1	#2	#3	#4	#5	#6	#7	Result	Rank
Alper Kulaksiz	Long jump	7.61 +0.9	7.61 +1.2	7.06 +0.7	X	7.48 +1.0	7.60; 0.0		7.61	6
Askin Karaca	Triple jump	16.21 +0.6	X	15.87 +0.3	X	X	16.12 +1.1		16.21	5
Mikail Yalcin	Triple jump	15.21 +1.4	X	X	15.12 +0.4	15.27 −0.7	14.77 +1.1		15.27	7
Serhat Birinci	High jump	2.00 –	2.05 –	2.10 –	2.15; O	2.18 –	2.21; O	2.24; XXX	2.21	4
Sahabettin Karabulut	High jump	2.00 –	2.05; O	2.10; O	2.15; XXO	2.18; XXX			2.15 SB	10
Huseyin Atici	Shot put	18.80	19.25	19.53	X	19.07	19.41		19.53	5
Murat Gunduz	Shot put	17.49	17.42	17.66	17.43	X	17.19		17.66	8
Ercument Olgundeniz	Discus throw	61.46	X	X	60.78	61.02	X		61.46	2nd place, silver medalist(s)
Irfan Yildirim	Discus throw	60.28	61.15	X	X	61.21	60.42		61.21	4
Fatih Avan	Javelin throw	82.39	83.84	-	-	-	X		83.84	1st place, gold medalist(s)
Mustafa Tan	Javelin throw	70.29	X	70.49	X	68.84	70.13		70.49	7

=== Women ===
Athlete	Event	Heat		Final	
Athlete	Event	Time	Rank	Time	Rank
Nimet Karakuş	100 metres	DNF			DNQ
Hatice Ozturk	100 metres	12.20	6		DNQ
Nimet Karakuş	200 metres	23.71	2	23.40 PB	3rd place, bronze medalist(s)
Birsen Engin	400 metres			53.37 SB	4
Derya Yildirim	400 metres			55.25	6
Tuğba Koyuncu	800 metres			2:01.74	3rd place, bronze medalist(s)
Elif Karabulut	800 metres			2:08.58	6
Tuğba Koyuncu	1500 metres			4:06.22	3rd place, bronze medalist(s)
Esma Aydemir	1500 metres			4:09.06 SB	5
Esma Aydemir	5000 metres				DNF
Elvan Abeylegesse	10,000 metres			32:59.30	2nd place, silver medalist(s)
Bahar Doğan	10,000 metres			35:27.48	5
Kubra Sesli	100 metres hurdles				DNS
Birsen Engin	400 metres hurdles			57.72	5
Ozge Akin	400 metres hurdles			58.13	6
Gulcan Mingir	3000 metres steeplechase			9:46.08	3rd place, bronze medalist(s)
Turkan Ozata	3000 metres steeplechase			9:52.04	5
Aksel Gurcan Demirtas	4×100 metres relay			46.24	5
Saliha Ozyurt	4×400 metres relay			3:43.61	2nd place, silver medalist(s)
Ummu Kiraz	Half marathon			1:16:51	3rd place, bronze medalist(s)
Sultan Haydar	Half marathon			1:18:01	4
Elvan Abeylegesse	Half marathon				DNS
Gamze Ozgor	20 kilometres walk				DNF
Narin Saglam	20 kilometres walk				DNS
Serpil Kocak	Heptathlon 200m			25.55	2
Serpil Kocak	Heptathlon 800m			2:35.75	4
Serpil Kocak	Heptathlon 100m hurdles			14.44	3
Serpil Kocak	Heptathlon Long jump			5.87	2
Serpil Kocak	Heptathlon High jump			1.60	4
Serpil Kocak	Heptathlon Shot put			11.98	3
Serpil Kocak	Heptathlon Javelin throw			35.17	3
Pınar Aday	Heptathlon 200m			27.49	4
Pınar Aday	Heptathlon 800m			2:23.46	3
Pınar Aday	Heptathlon 100m hurdles			14.53	4
Pınar Aday	Heptathlon Long jump			5.75	3
Pınar Aday	Heptathlon High jump			1.75	1
Pınar Aday	Heptathlon Shot put			9.07	4
Pınar Aday	Heptathlon Javelin throw			29.04	4

Athlete	Event	#1	#2	#3	#4	#5	#6	#7	Result	Rank
Serpil Kocak	Long jump	X	5.92 +0.9	5.92; 0.0					5.92	9
Sevim Sinmez Serbest	Long jump	X	X	5.61 +0.6					5.61	10
Sevim Sinmez Serbest	Triple jump	13.61 +1.9	X	13.56 +1.4	13.27 +0.8	13.75 +0.3	13.67 +1.1		13.75	5
Burcu Ayhan Yuksel	High jump	1.78; O	1.81; O	1.84; O	1.87; O	1.90; O	1.92; O	1.94; XXX	1.92 SB	1st place, gold medalist(s)
Sibel Cinar	High jump	1.70; O	1.75; O	1.78; XXO	1.81; XXX				1.78	5
Elmas Seda Firtina	Pole vault	3.65 –	3.80 –	3.95; O	4.10; XXX				3.95	7
Buse Arikazan	Pole vault	3.85 –	3.80; O	3.95; XXO	4.10; XXX				3.95	8
Ayşegül Alnıaçık	Hammer throw	X	X	60.18	61.25	62.23	X		62.23	4
Berivan Sakir	Javelin throw	45.54	49.35	49.70	X	X	49.70		49.70	5
Eda Tugsuz	Javelin throw	X	44.60	X	44.37	47.82	48.87		48.87	7

=== Paralympic ===
Athlete	Event	Heat		Final	
Athlete	Event	Time	Rank	Time	Rank
Birol Kamar	Men's 1500 metres T54	3:43.84 SB	4	3:40.21 SB	8
Omer Cantay	Men's 1500 metres T54	3:36.58 SB	3	3:31.67 SB	5

== Badminton ==
=== Men ===
Group stage

Athlete	Event	Match #1	Match #2	Match #3	Match #4	Rank
Emre Lale	Singles	(Greece) Vasileios Kiomourtzidis; W 2–0 (21–7, 21–12)	(Slovenia) Iztok Utroša; L 1–2 (21–16, 13–21, 12–21)	(Italy) Rosario Maddaloni; W 2–0 (21–15, 21–10)	(Croatia) Zvonimir Đurkinjak; L 0–2 (10–21, 11–21)	Q
Ramazan Öztürk	Singles	(Slovenia) Miha Horvat; W 2–0 (21–16, 21–11)	(France) Matthieu Lo Ying Ping; W 2–0 (21–18, 21–9)	(Spain) Ernesto Velázquez; L 0–2 (12–21, 16–21)	(Lebanon) Jalal Abou Alwan; W 2–0 (21–7, 21–4)	Q
Emre Aslan; Hüseyin Oruç	Doubles	(Slovenia) Iztok Utroša; Miha Horvat; L 1–2 (19–21, 21–17, 15–21)	(Greece) Vasileios Kiomourtzidis; Ilias Xanthou; W 2–0 (21–9, 21–13)	(France) Baptiste Carême; Gaëtan Mittelheisser; L 0–2 (12–21, 16–21)		Q

Knockout stage

Athlete	Event	Round of 16	Round of 8	Quarterfinal	Semifinal	Final	Rank
Emre Lale	Singles	(Croatia) Zvonimir Hölbling; W 2–0 (21–12, 21–16)		(France) Brice Leverdez; L 0–2 (11–21, 6–21)	–	–	
Ramazan Öztürk	Singles	(Italy) Giovanni Greco; L 0–2 (18–21, 19–21)	–	–	–	–	
Emre Aslan; Hüseyin Oruç	Doubles		(Spain) Ernesto Velázquez; Pablo Abián; W 2–0 (21–14, 21–16)		(France) Baptiste Carême; Gaëtan Mittelheisser; W 2–1 (21–18, 24–22)	(Croatia) Zvonimir Đurkinjak; Zvonimir Hölbling; L 0–2 (15–21, 9–21)	2nd place, silver medalist(s)

=== Women ===
Group stage

Athlete	Event	Match #1	Match #2	Match #3	Rank
Neslihan Yiğit	Singles	(Italy) Agnese Allegrini; W 2–0 (21–15, 21–11)	(Serbia) Milica Simić; W 2–0 (21–15, 21–10)	(France) Perrine Le Buhanic; W 2–0 (21–16, 21–7)	Q
Özge Bayrak	Singles	(Slovenia) Nika Končut; W 2–0 (21–5, 21–6)	(North Macedonia) Ina Stefanovska; W 2–0 (21–5, 21–3)	(Greece) Theodora Ligomenou; W 2–0 (21–9, 21–11)	Q
Neslihan Yiğit; Özge Bayrak	Doubles	(Italy) Karin Maran; Xandra Stelling; W 2–0 (21–9, 21–11)	(Slovenia) Maja Tvrdy; Nika Končut; W 2–0 (21–13, 21–16)	(France) Émilie Lefel; Audrey Fontaine; W 2–0 (21–13, 21–11)	1st place, gold medalist(s)

Knockout stage

Athlete	Event	Quarterfinal	Semifinal	Final	Rank
Neslihan Yiğit	Singles	(Slovenia) Nika Končut; W 2–0 (21–8, 21–5)	(Italy) Agnese Allegrini; W 2–0 (21–13, 21–15)	(Turkey) Özge Bayrak; W 2–0 (21–16, 21–13)	1st place, gold medalist(s)
Özge Bayrak	Singles	(France) Perrine Le Buhanic; W 2–1 (12–21, 21–6, 21–15)	(Slovenia) Maja Tvrdy; W 2–0 (21–7, 21–16)	(Turkey) Neslihan Yiğit; L 0–2 (16–21, 13–21)	2nd place, silver medalist(s)

== Basketball ==
=== Men's tournament ===
Team

- Barış Ermiş
- Barış Hersek
- Birkan Batuk
- Can Mutaf
- Cemal Nalga
- Deniz Kılıçlı
- Doğuş Balbay
- Emre Bayav
- İzzet Türkyılmaz
- Melih Mahmutoğlu
- Oğuz Savaş
- Serhat Çetin

Coach: (Turkey) Bogdan Tanjević

Preliminary round

Qualified for the semifinals

Team	Pld	W	L	PF	PA	PD	Pts
Turkey	3	3	0	260	191	+69	6
Macedonia	3	2	1	220	225	-5	5
Egypt	3	1	2	218	239	-21	4
Algeria	3	0	3	228	271	-43	3

June 18
19:30

Report

Turkey	97–68	Algeria
Scoring by quarter: 20–16, 24–16, 30–16, 23–20
Pts: Mahmutoğlu 17; Rebs: Savaş 6 Asts: Ermiş 5		Pts: Harat 25; Rebs: Harat 7 Asts: Kaouane 3

Servet Tazegül Arena, Mersin
Referees: Licina (SRB), Langar (TUN), Mikhaylov (RUS)

June 19
19:30

Report

Egypt	66–86	Turkey
Scoring by quarter: 15–23, 10–16, 20–20, 21–27
Pts: El-Gammal 19; Rebs: Marei 5 Asts: El-Gammal 4		Pts: Savaş 19; Rebs: Türkyılmaz 8 Asts: Ermiş 9

Servet Tazegül Arena, Mersin
Referees: Tsekov (BUL), Martolini (ITA), Licina (SRB)

June 21
20:00

Report

Turkey	77–57	North Macedonia
Scoring by quarter: 29–18, 15–13, 22–13, 11–13
Pts: Savaş, Çetin 15; Rebs: Kılıçlı 11; Asts: Ermiş 7		Pts: Sokolov 13; Rebs: Šterjov 5 Asts: Avramovski, Kostoski 3

Servet Tazegül Arena, Mersin
Referees: Martolini (ITA), Mikhaylov (RUS), Tsekov (BUL)

Semifinal

June 22
19:30

Turkey	77–69	Tunisia
Scoring by quarter: 20–13, 23–20, 13–20, 21–16
Pts: Savaş 25; Rebs: Türkyılmaz 7 Asts: Ermiş 6		Pts: Ben Romdhane 21; Rebs: Mejri 12; Asts: Mouhli 5

Servet Tazegül Arena, Mersin
Referees: Ciulin (ROM), Mikhaylov (RUS), Martolini (ITA)

Gold medal match

June 25
19:30

Serbia	62–79	Turkey
Scoring by quarter: 18–21, 10–24, 19–17, 15–17
Pts: Kalinic 16; Rebs: Balaban 5 Asts: Zivanovic, Dimic 3		Pts: Nalga 14; Rebs: Türkyılmaz 9 Asts: Ermiş 6

Servet Tazegül Arena, Mersin
Referees: Cortes (ESP), Tsekov (BUL), Denkovski (MKD)

Final standing

Rank	Team	Record
Gold medal	Turkey	5–0

== Beach volleyball ==
=== Men's tournament ===
Preliminary round

Athlete	Event	Match #1	Match #2	Qualification
Murat Giginoglu; Selcuk Sekerci	Men's tournament	France; W 2–0 (21–19, 21–15)	Serbia; W 2–1 (21–19, 16–21, 15–9)	Q
Hakan Gögtepe; Nuri Sahin	Men's tournament	Spain; L 0–2 (18–21, 21–23)	Croatia; W 2–0 (21–16, 21–17)	Q

Knockout stage

Athlete	Event	Quarterfinal	5th–8th Placement	7th–8th Placement	Semifinal	Final	Rank
Murat Giginoglu; Selcuk Sekerci	Men's tournament	Serbia; W 2–0 (21–15, 21–17)			France; W 2–0 (21–15, 21–17)	Spain; W 2–0 (21–19, 21–17)	1st place, gold medalist(s)
Hakan Gögtepe; Nuri Sahin	Men's tournament	France; L 1–2 (16–21, 21–23, 9–15)	Serbia; L 1–2 (16–21, 21–17, 13–15)	France; W 2–1 (22–20, 14–21, 151-0+)	–	–	7

=== Women's tournament ===
Preliminary round

Athlete	Event	Match #1	Match #2	Qualification
Burcu Baser; Esra Otucu	Women's tournament	Cyprus; L 0–2 (17–21, 13–21)	France; L 1–2 (18–21, 21–18, 11–15)	DNQ
Burcu Atasoy; Meliha Ismailoglu	Women's tournament	France; W 2–0 (21–14, 21–17)	Italy; L 0–2 (12–21, 15–21)	Q

Knockout stage

Athlete	Event	Quarterfinal	5th–8th Placement	7th–8th Placement	Rank
Burcu Atasoy; Meliha Ismailoglu	Women's tournament	Slovenia; L 0–2 (16–21, 12–21)	Spain; L 0–2 (17–21, 16–21)	France; W 2–0 (21–19, 21–10)	7

== Bocce ==
=== Men ===
Preliminary round

Athlete	Event	Match #1	Match #2	Match #3	Match #4
Team	Pétanque doubles	France; L 7–13	San Marino; W 13–4	Morocco; L 0–13	Libya; W 13–0
Yunus Emre Gungor	Raffa singles	(San Marino) Matteo Albani; L 6–12	(Algeria) Djillali Berrezouk; W 12–4	(Montenegro) Miroslav Petkovic; W 12–1	(Libya) Rashed Swesi; W 12–1
Team	Raffa doubles	Montenegro; W 12–3	San Marino; L 5–12	France; L 7–12	

Knockout stage

Athlete	Event	Semifinal	Final/Bronze medal	Rank
Yunus Emre Gungor	Raffa singles	(Italy) Pasquale D'Alterio; L 4–12	(Malta) Stefan Farrugia; W 12–4	3rd place, bronze medalist(s)

=== Women ===
Athlete	Event	Preliminary round		Knockout stage		Rank
Athlete	Event	Match #1	Match #2	Semifinal	Final/Bronze medal	Rank
Seda Geridonmez	Lyonnaise progressive throw					2nd place, silver medalist(s)
Team	Pétanque doubles	Spain; L 2–13	Serbia; W 13–5	Tunisia; L 8–13	France; L 0–13	4
Deniz Demir	Raffa singles	(Algeria) Lamia Aissioui; W 12–3	(Italy) Maria Losorro; W 12–3	(Serbia) Ivana Sajic; W 12–5	(San Marino) Anna Maria Ciucci; W 12–9	1st place, gold medalist(s)
Team	Raffa doubles	San Marino; W 12–5	Algeria; W 12–2	Serbia; W 12–3	Italy; L 11–12	2nd place, silver medalist(s)

Athlete	Event	Rank
Seda Geridonmez	Lyonnaise progressive throw	2nd place, silver medalist(s)
Team	Raffa doubles	2nd place, silver medalist(s)

== Boxing ==
Athlete	Event	Round of 16	Quarterfinal	Semifinal	Final	Rank
Ferhat Pehlivan	Light flyweight	BYE	BYE	(Egypt) Ramy Elawady; W 3–0	(Algeria) Mohamed Flissi; L 0–3	2nd place, silver medalist(s)
Erdal İnanlı	Flyweight	BYE	BYE	(Spain) José Kelvin de la Nieve; L 0–3		3rd place, bronze medalist(s)
Mehmet Topçakan	Bantamweight	BYE	BYE	(Algeria) Reda Benbaziz; L 0–3		3rd place, bronze medalist(s)
Bünyamin Aydın	Lightweight	BYE	(Tunisia) Ahmed Mejri; W 2–1	(Algeria) Mohamed Amine Ouadahi; W 3–0	(France) Sofiane Oumiha; L 1–2	2nd place, silver medalist(s)
Fatih Keleş	Light welterweight	(Lebanon) Khodor Antar; W 3–0	(France) Hassan Amzile; W 3–0	(Greece) Alexandros Tsanikidis; W 3–0	(Algeria) Abdelkader Chadi; L 0–3	2nd place, silver medalist(s)
Abdulkadir Köroğlu ⋅	Welterweight	BYE	(Algeria) Ilyas Abbadi; L 0–3			
Adem Kılıççı	Middleweight				(Egypt) Hosam Abdin	1st place, gold medalist(s)
Avni Yıldırım	Light heavyweight					3rd place, bronze medalist(s)
Ali Eren Demirezen	Super heavyweight					2nd place, silver medalist(s)

== Canoeing ==
=== Men ===
Athlete	Event	Rank
Cagribey Yildirim; Serhat Kadir Yilmaz	K-2 200 metres	3rd place, bronze medalist(s)

== Cycling ==
Athlete	Event	Time	Rank
Rasim Reis	Road time trial	33:41	3rd place, bronze medalist(s)
Mustafa Sayar	Road time trial	33:52	4

== Fencing ==
=== Men ===
Athlete	Event	Rank
Bora Ismail Biren	Individual foil	

=== Wonen ===
Athlete	Event	Rank
Gokce Gunac	Individual épée	
Reha Dogan	Individual épée	
İrem Karamete	Individual foil	3rd place, bronze medalist(s)

== Football ==
=== Men's tournament ===
Team

- Cantuğ Temel
- Ozan Tufan
- Abdülkerim Bardakcı
- Muhammed Serdar Yazıcı
- Süheyl Çetin
- Kubilay Aktaş
- Kubilay Dursun Sönmez
- İbrahim Coşkun
- Berk İsmail Ünsal
- Recep Niyaz
- Okan Aydın
- Emre Selen
- İsmail Güven
- Gökhan Sazdağı
- Metin Sevinç
- Atabey Çiçek
- Sedat Yüce
- Haydar Deniz

Coach: (Turkey) Gökhan Keskin

Preliminary round

Team	Pld	W	D	L	GF	GA	GD	Pts
Morocco	3	3	0	0	7	2	+5	9
Turkey	3	2	0	1	8	4	+4	6
Albania	3	0	1	2	3	6	−3	1
Bosnia and Herzegovina	3	0	1	2	4	10	−6	1

June 19, 2013
21:45

Turkey	2–0	Albania
Aydın 10'; Sazdağı 86'	Report

Tevfik Sırrı Gür Stadium, Mersin
Referee: Andrea De Marco (Italy)

June 21, 2013
21:45

Turkey	1–2	Morocco
Yazıcı 57'	Report	El Karti 11'; En-Neoualy 72' (pen.)

Tarsus Şehir Stadı, Tarsus

June 23, 2013
18:00

Bosnia and Herzegovina	2–5	Turkey
Bajić 18', 30'	Report	Sazdağı 14'; Ünsal 39'; Aydın 43'; Coşkun 82'; Çiçek 86'

Tevfik Sırrı Gür Stadium, Mersin
Referee: Andrea De Marco (Italy)

Semifinal

June 25, 2013
18:00

Tunisia	0–2	Turkey
		Bardakcı 50'; Niyaz 77'

Tevfik Sırrı Gür Stadium, Mersin
Referee: Anatoly Zhabchenko (Ukraine)

Gold Medal match

June 27, 2013
22:00

Morocco	2–2 (a.e.t.)	Turkey
Khaloua 2'; Ennaffati 71'		Bardakcı 15'; Coşkun 28'
Penalties
	3–2

Tevfik Sırrı Gür Stadium, Mersin
Referee: Andrea De Marco (Italy)

Final standing

Rank	Team	Record
Silver medal	Turkey	3–2

== Gymnastics, artistic ==
=== Men ===
Athlete	Event	Rank
İbrahim Çolak	Rings	2nd place, silver medalist(s)
Ferhat Arıcan	Parallel bars	3rd place, bronze medalist(s)
Ümit Şamiloğlu	Horizontal bar	1st place, gold medalist(s)

=== Women ===
Individual all-around

Athlete	Vault (gymnastics)	Uneven bars	Balance beam	Floor (gymnastics)	Total	Rank
Demet Mutlu	13.700	10.300	10.800	12.566	47.366	QR 11
Demet Mutlu	13.100	11.366	11.800	12.466	48.732	7
Sema Fidel Aslan	13.300	10.666	11.566	11.166	46.698	QR 12
Sema Fidel Aslan	12.633	10.033	11.133	11.266	45.065	11

Vault

Athlete	Vault 1				Vault 2				Total	Rank
Athlete	D Score	E Score	Penalty	Vault Score	D Score	E Score	Penalty	Vault Score	Total	Rank
Demet Mutlu	5.000	8.700		13.700	4.600	8.733		13.333	13.516	QR 5
Demet Mutlu	5.000	8.500		13.500	4.600	8.833		13.433	13.466	4

Balance beam

Athlete	D Score	E Score	Pen.	Total	Rank
Ozlem Ozkan	5.000	8.133		13.133	QR 7
Ozlem Ozkan	5.000	7.000		12.000	7
Sema Fidel Aslan	4.700	6.866		11.566	QR 15

== Gymnastics, rhythmic ==
Qualification

Gymnast	Ball (rhythmic gymnastics)	Hoop (rhythmic gymnastics)	Clubs (rhythmic gymnastics)	Ribbon (rhythmic gymnastics)	Total	Position
Zeynep Kusem	15.650	15.900	15.733	15.583	62.866	7 Q
Burcin Neziroglu	15.200	16.217	14.883	14.867	61.167	8 Q
Ekin Guler	14.233	15.050	14.933	14.383	58.599	14 DNQ

Final

Gymnast	Ball (rhythmic gymnastics)	Hoop (rhythmic gymnastics)	Clubs (rhythmic gymnastics)	Ribbon (rhythmic gymnastics)	Total	Rank
Burcin Neziroglu	15.217	15.783	14.933	15.450	61.383	7
Zeynep Kusem	14.983	15.700	15.083	14.900	60.666	8

== Handball ==
=== Men's tournament ===
Team

- Yunus Özmusul
- Taner Günay
- Coşkun Göktepe
- Alp Eren Pektaş
- Onur Ersin
- Taner Öymen
- Emre Öz
- Şenol Boyar
- Tuğrul Bulduk
- Durmuş Mutlu
- Tolga Özbahar
- Tuğberk Çatkın
- Ramazan Döne
- Alican Göçmen
- Uğur Erceylan
- Can Çelebi

Coach: (Turkey) Adnan Öztürk

Preliminary round
Group A

Team	Pld	W	D	L	GF	GA	GD	Pts
Turkey	4	3	0	1	113	107	+6	6
Italy	4	2	0	2	109	100	+9	4
Serbia	4	2	0	2	112	93	+19	4
North Macedonia	4	2	0	2	90	109	−19	4
Algeria	4	1	0	3	95	110	−15	2

23 June 2013; 14:00	Italy	30–34	Turkey	Lütfullah Aksungur Sports Hall, Adana; Referees: Carlos Javier Gude, Juan Jose Gude (ESP)
23 June 2013; 14:00	Skatar 9	(13–19)	Döne 11	Lütfullah Aksungur Sports Hall, Adana; Referees: Carlos Javier Gude, Juan Jose Gude (ESP)

24 June 2013; 16:00	Turkey	30–29	Serbia	Lütfullah Aksungur Sports Hall, Adana; Referees: Mansour Al Suwaidi, Saleh Bamutref (QAT)
24 June 2013; 16:00	Döne 7	(17–13)	Stankovic 8	Lütfullah Aksungur Sports Hall, Adana; Referees: Mansour Al Suwaidi, Saleh Bamutref (QAT)

26 June 2013; 18:00	Algeria	24–26	Turkey	Lütfullah Aksungur Sports Hall, Adana; Referees: Dalibor Jurinovic, Marko Mrvic (CRO)
26 June 2013; 18:00	Hamoud 7	(11–12)	Döne, Ersin 5	Lütfullah Aksungur Sports Hall, Adana; Referees: Dalibor Jurinovic, Marko Mrvic (CRO)

27 June 2013; 12:00	Turkey	23–24	North Macedonia	Lütfullah Aksungur Sports Hall, Adana; Referees: Mohamed Rashed, Tamer Elsayed (EGY)
27 June 2013; 12:00	Çelebi 9	(9–9)	Georgievski 7	Lütfullah Aksungur Sports Hall, Adana; Referees: Mohamed Rashed, Tamer Elsayed (EGY)

Semifinals

29 June 2013; 18:00	Egypt	25–22	Turkey	Lütfullah Aksungur Sports Hall, Adana; Referees: Amer Konjicanin, Dino Konjicanin (BIH)
29 June 2013; 18:00	Abouebaid, Issa, Radwan, El-Ahmar, Ali Zein 4	(13–11)	Çatkın 6	Lütfullah Aksungur Sports Hall, Adana; Referees: Amer Konjicanin, Dino Konjicanin (BIH)

Bronze Medal Match

30 June 2013; 10:00	Turkey	32–26	Italy	Lütfullah Aksungur Sports Hall, Adana; Referees: Dalibor Jurinovic, Marko Mrvica (CRO)
30 June 2013; 10:00	Döne 11	(18–14)	Gaeta, Radovčić, Maione 5	Lütfullah Aksungur Sports Hall, Adana; Referees: Dalibor Jurinovic, Marko Mrvica (CRO)

Final standing

Rank	Team	Record
Bronze medal	Turkey	4–2

=== Women's tournament ===
Team

- Serpil Soylu Çapar
- Derya Tınkaoğlu
- Yeliz Yılmaz
- Serpil İskenderoğlu
- Yasemin Şahin
- Betül Yılmaz
- Çağla Yılmaz
- Esin Sağdıç
- Selma Pekmutlu Akgül
- Perihan Topaloğlu
- Nur Ceren
- Diğdem Hoşgör
- Çiğdem Özcan
- Seda Yörükler
- Neslihan Yakupoğlu
- Aslı İskit

Coach: (Turkey) Hikmet Vurgun

Preliminary round
Group A

Team	Pld	W	D	L	GF	GA	GD	Pts
Serbia	4	4	0	0	111	86	+25	8
Montenegro	4	2	0	2	81	88	−7	4
Turkey	4	2	0	2	96	98	−2	4
Algeria	4	1	0	3	89	95	−6	2
Italy	4	1	0	3	94	104	−10	2

22 June 2013; 17:00	Algeria	23–25	Turkey	Yüreğir Serinevler Arena, Adana; Referees: Carlos Javier Gude, Juan Jose Gude (ESP)
22 June 2013; 17:00	Ait Ahmed 5		Şahin 7	Yüreğir Serinevler Arena, Adana; Referees: Carlos Javier Gude, Juan Jose Gude (ESP)

23 June 2013; 15:30	Turkey	22–25	Montenegro	Yüreğir Serinevler Arena, Adana; Referees: Mansour Al Suwaidi, Saleh Bamutref (QAT)
23 June 2013; 15:30	B. Yılmaz 8	(10–10)	Mehmedovic 10	Yüreğir Serinevler Arena, Adana; Referees: Mansour Al Suwaidi, Saleh Bamutref (QAT)

25 June 2013; 14:00	Serbia	24–21	Turkey	Yüreğir Serinevler Arena, Adana; Referees: Andrei Gousko, Siharhei Repkin
25 June 2013; 14:00	Atanaskovic 6	(11–7)	İskenderoğlu, B. Yılmaz 4	Yüreğir Serinevler Arena, Adana; Referees: Andrei Gousko, Siharhei Repkin

26 June 2013; 13:00	Turkey	28–26	Italy	Yüreğir Serinevler Arena, Adana; Referees: Amer Konjicanin, Dino Konjicanin (BIH)
26 June 2013; 13:00	İskit, Şahin 6	(11–14)	Gheorghe 8	Yüreğir Serinevler Arena, Adana; Referees: Amer Konjicanin, Dino Konjicanin (BIH)

Placement 5th – 6th Match

28 June 2013; 13:00	Spain	29–23	Turkey	Yüreğir Serinevler Arena, Adana; Referees: Simone Zandali, Stefano Riello (ITA)
28 June 2013; 13:00	Cabral 10	(16–11)	İskenderoğlu 6	Yüreğir Serinevler Arena, Adana; Referees: Simone Zandali, Stefano Riello (ITA)

Final standing

Rank	Team	Record
6th	Turkey	2–3

== Judo ==
=== Men ===
Athlete	Event	Round of 16	Quarterfinal	Final of Table	Repechage	Final / BM	Rank
Ahmet Şahin Kaba	−60 kg	BYE	(Italy) Fabio Basile; W 1–0, 1–0 0–1 Ippon	(Libya) Mohamed Elhadi Elkawisah; W 0–0, 1–0 1–0 Waza-Ari	–	(Morocco) Yassine Moudatir; L 0–1, 1–0 1–0 Ippon	2nd place, silver medalist(s)
Murat Doğan	−66 kg	BYE	(Slovenia) Andraz Jereb; L 0–1, 0–0 0–0 Ippon	–	(Tunisia) Houcem Khalfaoui; W 1–0, 2–0 0–0 Awasete Ippon	(Albania) Lleshi Kristijan; L 0–1, 1–0 0–0 Ippon	4
Hasan Vanlıoğlu	−73 kg	BYE	(France) Jonathan Allardon; W 0–0, 0–0 1–0 Yuko	(Greece) Roman Moustopoulo; W 1–0, 0–0 0–0 Ippon	–	(Serbia) Ljubisa Kovacevic; W 0–0, 0–0 1–0 Yuko	1st place, gold medalist(s)
Ahmet Sarı	−81 kg	(Morocco) Safouane Attaf; W 0–0, 1–0 1–1 Waza-Ari	(France) Quentin Joubert; L 0–0, 0–0 0–0 -2 Shidos	–	–	(Italy) Massimiliano Carollo; L 0–1, 0–2 0–0 Awasete Ippon	4
Yunus Suren	-90 kg	(Slovenia) Tadej Mulec; L 0–1, 0–2 0–0 Awasete Ippon	–	–	–	–	
Feyyaz Yazıcı	-100 kg	(Spain) Alejandro Sanmartin Carrera; W 1–0, 2–0, 1–0 Awasete Ippon	(Italy) Vincenzo D'Arco; L 0–0, 0–1, 1–0 Waza-Ari	–	(San Marino) Karim Gharb; W 1–0, 0–0, 0–0 Ippon	(Tunisia) Anis Ben Khaled; W 0–0, 1–0, 0–0 Golden Point	3rd place, bronze medalist(s)
Burak Serbest	+100 kg	(Morocco) El Mehdi Malki; L 0–1, 0–2, 0–0 Awasete Ippon	–	–	–	–	

=== Women ===
Athlete	Event	Round of 16	Quarterfinal	Final of Table	Repechage	Final / BM	Rank
Ebru Şahin	−48 kg	BYE	BYE	(Italy) Scarlett Gabrielli; W 1–0, 0–0, 0–0 Ippon	–	(Italy) Valentina Moscatt; W 0–0, 1–0, 0–0 Waza-Ari	1st place, gold medalist(s)
Ayse Saadet Arca	−52 kg	BYE	(Greece) Maria Karagiannopoulou; W 1–0, 0–0, 0–0 Ippon	(Spain) Laura Gomez Ropinon; L 0–1, 0–1, 0–0 Ippon	–	(Spain) Elena Moretti; W 1–0, 2–1, 0–0 Awasete Ippon	3rd place, bronze medalist(s)
Tuğba Zehir	-57 kg	BYE	(Algeria) Ratiba Tariket; W 0–0, 0–0, 1–0 Yuko	(Slovenia) Vlora Bedeti; L 0–1, 0–0, 0–0 Ippon	–	(France) Shirley Elliot; L 0–1, 0–2, 0–0 Awasete Ippon	4
Nazmiye Yılmaz	-78 kg	BYE	(Lebanon) Marie Aad; W 1–0, 0–0, 0–0 Ippon	(France) Géraldine Mentouopou; L 0–1, 0–1, 0–0 Ippon	–	(Greece) Vasiliki Lymperopoulou; L 0–1, 0–0, 1–1 Ippon	4
Belkis Zehra Kaya	+78 kg	BYE	(Bosnia and Herzegovina) Larisa Ceric; W 1–0, 2–0, 0–0 Awasete Ippon	(Tunisia) Nihel Chikhrouhou; L 0–1, 0–0, 0–0 Ippon	–	(Spain) Sara Alvarez Folgueiras; W 1–0, 0–0, 0–0 Ippon	3rd place, bronze medalist(s)

== Karate ==
=== Men ===
Athlete	Event	1/8 Final	Quarterfinal	Semifinal	Repechage	Final / BM	Rank
Aykut Kaya	60 kg	(Morocco) El Mehdi Benrouida; L 0–1	-	-	-	-	
Omer Kemaloglu	67 kg	(Serbia) Stefan Joksic; W 5–1	(Egypt) Magdy Mohamed; W 10–1	(Tunisia) Mohamed Amine Hasnaoui; W 4–1	–	(Morocco) Redouan Kousseksou; W 4–3	1st place, gold medalist(s)
Serkan Yagci	75 kg	(Italy) Luigi Busa'; W 4–0	(Greece) Nikolaos Gidakos; W 5–1	(Tunisia) Safouane Khammassi; W 4–1	–	(Spain) Fernando Moreno Paz; W 7–1	1st place, gold medalist(s)
Aykut Usda	84 kg	(North Macedonia) Berat Jakupi; L 1–9	–	–	–	–	
Enes Erkan	+84 kg	(North Macedonia) Martin Nestorovski; W 3–0	(Egypt) Mohanad Mohammed; W 5–3	(Bosnia and Herzegovina) Admir Zukan; W 3–3 HAN	–	(Italy) Stefano Maniscalco; L 1–7	2nd place, silver medalist(s)

=== Women ===
Athlete	Event	1/8 Final	Quarterfinals	Semifinals	Repechage	Final / BM	Rank
Serap Ozcelik	50 kg	BYE	(France) Alexandra Recchia; W 2–1	(Greece) Evdoxia Kosmidou; W 7–0	–	(Egypt) Areeg Rashed; W 8–0	1st place, gold medalist(s)
Tuba Yenen	55 kg	BYE	(Libya) Salha Mohamed Bashir Issa; W 8–0	(Spain) Marta Armenia Cerio; W 1–0	–	(France) Lucie Ignace; W 1–1 HAN	1st place, gold medalist(s)
Bahar Erseker	61 kg	(Libya) Salma Ali Saleh Hamouda; W 1–0	(Italy) Laura Pasqua; W 2–1	(Croatia) Ivana Bebek; W 2–1	–	(Egypt) Giana Lofty; W 0–0 HAN	2nd place, silver medalist(s)
Hafsa Şeyda Burucu	68 kg	(Morocco) Rahima Nouasse; W 6–0	(France) Alisee Agier; W 0–0 HAN	(Greece) Vasiliki Panetsidou; W 4–2	–	(Spain) Irene Colomar Costa; W 5–2 HAN	1st place, gold medalist(s)
Meltem Hocaoglu	+68 kg	BYE	(Italy) Greta Vitelli; W 3–1	(Spain) Laura Palacio Gonzales; W 1–0	–	(Egypt) Shymaa Alsayed; W 2–1	1st place, gold medalist(s)

== Rowing ==
Athlete	Event	Heat	Repechage	Final	Rank
Mustafa Barbaros Gozutok	Single sculls	7:29.11	7:27.65	7:12.94	5
Huseyin Kandemir	Lightweight single sculls	7:15.25	–	7:06.81	2nd place, silver medalist(s)
Selahattin Gursoy; Muhammed Cansı	Coxless pair	6:47.79	–	6:46.68	4
Enes Kusku; Bayram Sonmez	Lightweight double sculls	7:00.23	6:28.91	6:31.24	2nd place, silver medalist(s)

== Sailing ==
=== Men ===
Athlete	Event	Race											Net points	Final rank
Athlete	Event	1	2	3	4	5	6	7	8	9	10	M*	Net points	Final rank
Saffet Onur Bilgen	Laser	16	6	17	5	4	10	–	8	13	15	10	94	
Mustafa Cakir	Laser	19	11	14	20	12	12	–	15	14	19	18	136	
Ates Cinar; Deniz Cinar	470	3	3	1	2	–	8	6	8	6	8	7	45	
Tamer Emre Hasbay; Mustafa Sergen Birincioglu	470	10	10	4	9	–	10	9	10	9	10	10	81	

=== Women ===
Athlete	Event	Race											Net points	Final rank
Athlete	Event	1	2	3	4	5	6	7	8	9	10	M*	Net points	Final rank
Nazli Cagla Donertas	Laser Radial	4	5	3	1	3	4	4	2	4	5	2	35	3rd place, bronze medalist(s)
Simge Serim	Laser Radial	10	7	–	6	11	11	10	7	6	10	11	78	
Ceyla Yurtseven; Hazna Cansu Demir	470	7	7	8	5	–	8	7	8	7	8	8	65	

== Shooting ==
=== Men ===
Athlete	Event	Total	Rank
Yusuf Dikec	10 metre air pistol	577	2nd place, silver medalist(s)
Tugrul Ozer	10 metre air pistol	577	
Yusuf Dikec	50 metre pistol	555	1st place, gold medalist(s)
Ismail Keles	50 metre pistol	548	
Halil Ibrahim Ozturk	10 metre air rifle	614.1	2nd place, silver medalist(s)
Omer Akgun	10 metre air rifle	612.9	
Ahmet Bayrak	50 metre rifle prone	612.1	
Hikmet Karaaslan	50 metre rifle prone	612.4	
Orhan Al	50 metre rifle three positions	1107	
Erdinc Bilgili	50 metre rifle three positions	1123	
Alp Kizilsu	Trap	122	
Oguzhan Tuzun	Trap	121	
Yavuz Ilnam	Double trap	134	3rd place, bronze medalist(s)
Servet Sivrikaya	Double trap	133	
Huseyin Bahcivan	Skeet	111	
Murat Ugur	Skeet	117	

=== Women ===
Athlete	Event	Total	Rank
Canan Aynaci	10 metre air pistol	372	
Neslihan Temel	10 metre air pistol	377	
Canan Aynaci	25 metre pistol	551	
Ayse Karakas	10 metre air rifle	400.7	
Sirvan Yildiz	10 metre air rifle	403.7	
Nihan Kantarci	Trap	67	

== Swimming ==
=== Men ===
Athlete	Event	Heat		Final	
Athlete	Event	Time	Rank	Time	Rank
Doğa Çelik	50 metre freestyle	22.71	2	22.94	7
Kemal Arda Gurdal	50 metre freestyle	22.90	3	22.82	5
Doğa Çelik	100 metre freestyle	50.17	1	49.83	5
Kemal Arda Gürdal	100 metre freestyle	50.29	2	49.41 NR	2nd place, silver medalist(s)
Doğa Çelik	200 metre freestyle	1:56.76	6	–	DNQ
Nezir Karap	200 metre freestyle	1:52.26	2	–	DNQ
Ediz Yildirimer	400 metre freestyle	3:58.29	4	–	DNQ
Nezir Karap	400 metre freestyle	3:55.51 NR	2	3:56.07	6
Nezir Karap	1500 metre freestyle		DNS	–	DNQ
Güven Duvan	50 metre backstroke	26.07	5	25:89 NR	5
Burak Kartal	50 metre backstroke	26.94	8	26.99	8
Güven Duvan	100 metre backstroke	55.90	1	56.21	6
Berk Kahraman	100 metre backstroke	58.33	5	58.01	8
Furkan Turan	200 metre backstroke	2:11.94	3	2:11.97	8
Ali Ugur Erdogan	200 metre backstroke	2:08.96	5	2:07.29	6
Demir Atasoy	50 metre breaststroke	28.05	1	28.10	5
Ömer Aslanoglu	50 metre breaststroke	29.04	4	–	DNQ
Demir Atasoy	100 metre breaststroke	1:02.13	2	1:02.04	4
Ömer Aslanoglu	100 metre breaststroke	1:03.21	7	1:03.37	8
Berkay Sendikici	200 metre breaststroke	2:21.84	4	2:23.64	8
Metin Geyik	200 metre breaststroke	2:22.37	5	–	DNQ
Ozan Kemer	50 metre butterfly	25.39	5	–	DNQ
Iskender Baslakov	50 metre butterfly	24.30 NR	3	24.53	8
Kaan Turker Ayar	100 metre butterfly	54.70	3	–	DNQ
Abdul Halim Lafci	100 metre butterfly	55.28	4	–	DNQ
Gonen Karaa	200 metre butterfly	2:03.36	4	–	DNQ
Abdul Halim Lafci	200 metre butterfly	2:06.69	6	–	DNQ
Alpkan Ornek	200 metre individual medley	2:05.22	6	2:04.61	6
Timur Dellaloglu	200 metre individual medley	2:06.24	8	2:07.59	8
Alpkan Ornek	400 metre individual medley	4:28.95	4	4:26.59	5
Timur Dellaloglu	400 metre individual medley	4:27.41	3	4:30.68	8
(Ozan Kemer) Doğa Çelik; Iskender Baslakov; Furkan Deniz Maraşlı (Kaan Turker Ayar) Kemal Arda Gürdal	4×100 metre freestyle relay	3:24.02	2	3:18.79 NR	2nd place, silver medalist(s)
(Abdul Halim Lafci) Kemal Arda Gurdal (Ozan kemer) Nezir Karap (Kaan Turker Ayar) Furkan Deniz Maraşlı (Ediz Yildirimer) Doğa Çelik	4×200 metre freestyle relay	7:41.14	3	7:25.67 NR	3rd place, bronze medalist(s)
Güven Duvanl (Alpkan Ornek) Demir Atasoy (Abdul Halim Lafci) Kaan Türker Ayar (Ozan Kemer) Kemal Arda Gürdal	4×100 metre medley relay	3:53.65	4	3:41.58 NR	3rd place, bronze medalist(s)

=== Women ===
Athlete	Event	Heat		Final	
Athlete	Event	Time	Rank	Time	Rank
Burcu Dolunay	50 metre freestyle	25.75	1	25.42	3rd place, bronze medalist(s)
Nilufer Kuru	50 metre freestyle	26.70	6	–	DNQ
Burcu Dolunay	100 metre freestyle	56.91	2	56.82	8
Kubra Esra Kacmaz	100 metre freestyle	58.48	4	–	DNQ
Gizem Bozkurt	200 metre freestyle	2:05.37	4	–	DNQ
Merve Eroglu	400 metre freestyle	4:21.20	6	4:25.31	8
Halime Zulal Zeren	400 metre freestyle	4:30.21	6	–	DNQ
Merve Eroglu	800 metre freestyle	9:06.30	1		
Zeynep Balto	800 metre freestyle	9:20.27	3		
Hazal Sarikaya	50 metre backstroke	29.65	5	29.68	8
Gizem Çam	50 metre backstroke	30.13	4	–	DNQ
Hazal Sarikaya	100 metre backstroke	1:03.48	2	1:04.52	8
Halime Zulal Zeren	100 metre backstroke	1:04.42	4	1:02.70	4
Gizem Çam	200 metre backstroke	2:28.24	6	–	DNQ
Halime Zülal Zeren	200 metre backstroke	2:16.14	2	2:14.93 NR	3rd place, bronze medalist(s)
Dilara Buse Gunaydin	50 metre breaststroke	32.43	2	32.04 NR	2nd place, silver medalist(s)
Ceren Dilek	50 metre breaststroke	32.87	4	–	DNQ
Dilara Buse Gunaydin	100 metre breaststroke	1:09.21	1	1:09.00 NR	3rd place, bronze medalist(s)
Melisa Emirbayer	100 metre breaststroke	1:15.05	11	–	DNQ
Dilara Buse Gunaydin	200 metre breaststroke	2:32.40	3	2:28.20 NR	3rd place, bronze medalist(s)
Melisa Emirbayer	200 metre breaststroke	2:43.39	6	–	DNQ
Iris Rosenberger	50 metre butterfly	27.55	3	27.45	7
Ezgi Yazici	50 metre butterfly	28.14	4	27.77	8
Iris Rosenberger	100 metre butterfly	1:00.93	2	1:01.54	7
Gizem Bozkurt	100 metre butterfly	1:01.88	4	1:01.20	5
Iris Rosenberger	200 metre butterfly		DNS	–	DNQ
Melisa Akarsu	200 metre butterfly	2:17.45	3	2:16.76	5
Gizem Bozkurt	200 metre individual medley	2:21.03	7	2:17.08 NR	4
Melisa Akarsu	200 metre individual medley	2:21.40	9	–	DNQ
Duygu Birol	400 metre individual medley	5:09.17	5	–	DNQ
Melisa Akarsu	400 metre individual medley	4:59.16	4	4:57.64 NR	6
Esra Kübra Kaçmaz (lknur Nihan Cakici) Halime Zulal Zeren (Nilufer Kuru) Gizem Bozkurt; Burcu Dolunay	4×100 metre freestyle relay	3:57.84	6	3:47.35 NR	3rd place, bronze medalist(s)
(Kubra Esra Kacmaz) Gizem Bozkurt; Merve Eroglu; Melisa Akarsu (Zeynep Balto) Halime Zulal Zeren	4×200 metre freestyle relay	8:40.04	4	8:25.01 NR	4
(Gizem Çam) Halime Zulal Zeren (Ceren Dilek) Dilara Buse Gunaydin (Gizem Bozkurt) ıris Rosenberger (Nilufer Kuru) Burcu Dolunay	4×100 metre medley relay	4:22.01	5	4:09.29	5

=== Paralympics ===
Athlete	Event	Heat		Final	
Athlete	Event	Time	Rank	Time	Rank
Alper Ceylantepe	Men's 100 metre freestyle S10	1:10.66	5	–	DNQ
Ugur Ucak	Men's 100 metre freestyle S10	1:13.20	6	–	DNQ
Ozlem Kaya	Women's 100 metre freestyle S10	1:36.44	4	1:35.28	8
Sebnem Gure	Women's 100 metre freestyle S10	1:15.11	3	1:12.27	5

== Table tennis ==
=== Men ===
Round robin

Athlete	Event	Match #1	Match #2	Match #3	Match #4	Match #5	Match #6	Qualification
Bora Vang	Singles	(Lebanon) A. Moumjoghlian; W 4–0 (11–5, 11–4, 11–1, 11–1)	(Italy) N. Stoyanov; W 4–0 (11–7, 11–9, 11–4, 11–5)	(Serbia) Z. Pete; W 4–2 (9–11, 8–11, 12–11, 12–10, 11–4, 12–10)	(Egypt) O. Assar; W 4–0 (11–7, 11–7, 11–9, 11–9)	(Serbia) Z. Pete; W 4–2 (9–11, 8–11, 13–11, 12–10, 11–4, 12–10)	(Greece) E. Makras; W 4–0 (11–8, 11–7, 11–4, 11–4)	Q
Ahmet Li	Singles	(Italy) M. R. Bobocica; W 4–1 (6–11, 11–9, 12–10, 13–11, 11–2)	(Libya) A. Abushuwashi; W 4–0 (11–5, 11–2, 11–1, 11–3)	(Italy) N. Stoyanovi; W 4–1 (10–12, 11–4, 11–5, 11–4, 11–4)	(Spain) Z. He Cheng; L 3–4 (11–9, 11–8, 11–3, 8–11, 12–14, 6–11, 8–11)	(Tunisia) E. A. Lumboso; W 4–0 (14–12, 11–4, 11–5, 11–5)	–	Q
Gencay Menge	Singles	(Libya) M. Alhneaish	–	–	–	–	–	DNQ
Bora Vang; Ahmet Li	Team	Egypt	Greece	–	–	–	–	Q

Knockout stage

Athlete	Event	Quarterfinal	Semifinal	Final/Bronze medal	Rank
Bora Vang	Singles	(France) S. Gauzy; W 4–2 (11–9, 1–11, 11–7, 11–3, 11–7, 8–11, 11–8)	(Spain) Z. He Cheng; W 4–1 (11–4, 11–13, 11–5, 11–6, 11–7)	(Spain) Z. He Cheng; W 4–1 (11–4, 11–13, 11–5, 11–6, 11–7)	2nd place, silver medalist(s)
Ahmet Li	Singles	(Spain) C. D. Machado; W 4–0 (11–6, 11–8, 11–7, 11–9)	(Egypt) O. Assar; L 3–4 (11–7, 9–11, 11–9, 11–8, 9–11, 6–11, 9–11)	(Spain) Z. He Cheng	3rd place, bronze medalist(s)
Bora Vang; Ahmet Li	Team	–	Spain; W 3–0 (11–4, 11–8, 11–8)	Italy; W 3–0	1st place, gold medalist(s)

=== Women ===
Round robin

Athlete	Event	Match #1	Match #2	Match #3	Qualification
Melek Hu	Singles	(Italy) G. Piccolin; W 4–0 (11–8, 11–2, 11–8, 11–3)	(Slovenia) J. Tomazini; W 4–1 (13–11, 11–3, 9–11, 11–5, 11–5)	(Lebanon) H. Wehbe; W 4–0 (11–2, 11–4, 11–5, 11–1)	Q
Ipek Karahan	Singles	(France) Y. F. Xian; L 0–4 (4–11, 6–11, 10–12, 4–11)	(Italy) N. Stefanova; L 0–4 (5–11, 5–11, 6–11, 9–11)	–	DNQ
Melek Hu; Ipek Karahan	Team	Italy	–	–	DNQ

Knockout stage

Athlete	Event	Quarterfinal	Semifinal	Final	Rank
Melek Hu	Singles	(Egypt) D. Meshref; W 4–1 (11–5, 11–6, 13–15, 11–4, 11–3)	(Spain) Y. Shen Zhang; W 4–1 (11–8, 11–9, 8–11, 13–11, 11–4)	(Spain) Ramirez Bermudez; W 4–3 (9–11, 11–3, 10–12, 5–11, 11–6, 12–10, 11–6)	1st place, gold medalist(s)

== Taekwondo ==
=== Men ===
Athlete	Event	Round of 16	Quarterfinals	Semifinals	Final / BM	Rank
Fırat Pozan	−58 kg	BYE	Politis (GRE); W 6–2	Mendez (ESP); L 2–5	BYE	3rd place, bronze medalist(s)
Servet Tazegül	−68 kg	BYE	Ghofran (EGY); W 10–9	Quesada Barrera (ESP); L 7–12	BYE	3rd place, bronze medalist(s)
Yunus Sarı	−80 kg	BYE	Michel Samaha (LIB); W 5–4	Chernoubi (MAR); L 2–3	BYE	3rd place, bronze medalist(s)
Ali Sarı	+80 kg	Junique (FRA); W 2–1	Bernal (ESP); W 14–8	Leonardo Basile (ITA); W 3–2	Nikolaidis (GRE); W 5–0	1st place, gold medalist(s)

=== Women ===
Athlete	Event	Round of 16	Quarterfinals	Semifinals	Final / BM	Rank
Rukiye Yıldırım	−49 kg	BYE	Benes (ESP); W 4–3	Kouttouki (CYP); W 3–1	Abdelsalam (EGY); L 11–12	2nd place, silver medalist(s)
Hatice İlgun	−57 kg	BYE	Gladović (SRB); W 7–1	Paoli (LIB); W 15–7	Calvo (ESP); L 1–2	2nd place, silver medalist(s)
Nur Tatar	-67 kg	BYE	BYE	Wahba (EGY); W 6–1	El Meslahy (MAR); W 10–4	1st place, gold medalist(s)
Yaprak Eriş	+67 kg	BYE	Smiraglia (ITA); W 8–6	Mandić (SRB); L 6–1	BYE	3rd place, bronze medalist(s)

== Tennis ==
=== Men ===
Athlete	Event	Qualification	Quarterfinal	Semifinal	Final	Rank
Anil Yuksel	Singles	(Italy) Stefano Travaglia; L 0–2 (1–6, 4–6)	–	–	–	
Marsel İlhan	Singles	(Slovenia) Tomislav Ternar; W 2–1 (6–7, 6–1, 6–3)	(Libya) Faaris Ghasya; W 2–0 (6–4, 6–1)	(Tunisia) Mohamed Haythem Abid; W 2–1 (4–6, 6–3, 6–4)	(Slovenia) Blaz Rola; L 2–3 (7–6, 2–6, 6–3, 6–7, 2–6)	2nd place, silver medalist(s)
Haluk Akkoyun; Marsel İlhan	Doubles	BYE	BYE	(Tunisia) Mohamed Haythem Abid; Malek Jaziri; L 1–2 (2–6, 6–4, 8–10)	(Spain) Albert Alcaraz Ivorra; David Perez Sanz; L 0–2 (2–6, 3–6)	4

=== Women ===
Athlete	Event	Quarterfinal	Semifinal	Final	Rank
Çağla Büyükakçay	Singles	(Greece) Despoina Papamichail; W 2–0 (6–1, 6–3)	(Italy) Anastasia Grymalska; W 2–1 (4–6, 6–2, 7–5)	(Spain) Sara Sorribes Tormo; W 2–0 (6–1, 6–3)	1st place, gold medalist(s)
Pemra Ozgen	Singles	(Italy) Federica Di Sarra; L 0–2 (1–6, 4–6)	–	–	
Çağla Büyükakçay; Pemra Ozgen	Doubles	BYE	(Tunisia) Nour Abbes; Ons Jabeur; W 2–0 (6–3, 6–2)	(Italy) Federica Di Sarra; Anastasia Grymalska; W 2–1 (7–6, 4–6, 14–12)	1st place, gold medalist(s)

== Volleyball ==
=== Men's tournament ===
Team

- Burutay Subaşı
- Mustafa Koç
- Emre Batur
- Can Ayvazoğlu
- Hakkı Çapkınoğlu
- Ulaş Kıyak
- Ramazan Serkan Kılıç
- Metin Toy
- Vefa Yılmaz

Coach: (France) Veljko Basic

Preliminary round

Pos	Team	Pld	W	L	Pts	SW	SL	SR	SPW	SPL	SPR
1	France	2	1	1	4	5	4	1.250	214	215	0.995
2	Turkey	2	1	1	3	4	4	1.000	199	190	1.047
3	Egypt	2	1	1	2	4	5	0.800	193	201	0.960

Date	Time		Score		Set 1	Set 2	Set 3	Set 4	Set 5	Total	Report
23-Jun	18:00	Turkey	3–1	Egypt	21–25	25–21	25–20	25–15		96–81	
25-Jun	18:00	France	3–1	Turkey	22–25	25–22	25–21	37–35		109–103	

Semifinals

Date	Time		Score		Set 1	Set 2	Set 3	Set 4	Set 5	Total	Report
27-Jun	15:30	Turkey	2–3	Italy	25–21	19–25	15–25	25–21	12–15	96–107	

Bronze medal match

Date	Time		Score		Set 1	Set 2	Set 3	Set 4	Set 5	Total	Report
29-Jun	15:00	Turkey	2–3	France	21–25	25–17	25–18	21–25	12–15	104–100	

Final standing

Rank	Team	Record
4th	Turkey	1–3

=== Women's tournament ===
Team

- Gözde Kırdar Sonsırma
- Büşra Cansu
- Neslihan Darnel
- Seda Tokatlıoğlu
- Bahar Toksoy
- Naz Aydemir
- Gizem Güreşen Karadayı
- Güldeniz Önal
- Ergül Avcı
- Esra Gümüş

Coach: (Italy) Massimo Barbolini

Preliminary round

Pos	Team	Pld	W	L	Pts	SW	SL	SR	SPW	SPL	SPR
1	Turkey	2	2	0	6	6	1	6.000	169	121	1.397
2	Slovenia	2	1	1	3	3	3	1.000	128	134	0.955
3	Greece	2	0	2	0	1	6	0.167	127	169	0.751

Date	Time		Score		Set 1	Set 2	Set 3	Set 4	Set 5	Total	Report
24-Jun	18:00	Turkey	3–0	Slovenia	25–17	25–21	25–15			75–53	
26-Jun	18:00	Greece	1–3	Turkey	6–25	25–19	14–25	23–25		68–94	

Semifinals

Date	Time		Score		Set 1	Set 2	Set 3	Set 4	Set 5	Total	Report
28-Jun	18:00	Turkey	3–0	Croatia	25–14	25–16	25–14			75–44	

Gold medal match

Date	Time		Score		Set 1	Set 2	Set 3	Set 4	Set 5	Total	Report
30-Jun	14:00	Italy	3–1	Turkey	23–25	25–22	25–23	25–21		98–91	

Final standing

Rank	Team	Record
Silver medal	Turkey	3–1

== Water polo ==
=== Men's tournament ===
Preliminary round

Team	Pld	W	D	L	GF	GA	GD	Pts
Croatia	2	2	0	0	25	11	+14	4
Spain	2	1	0	1	20	11	+9	2
Turkey	2	0	0	2	7	30	−23	0

June 21, 2013; 19:30	Report	Turkey	3–13	Spain	Çiftlikköy Campus Swimming Pool, Mersin; Referees: Miskovic (SRB) and Collantoni (ITA)
June 21, 2013; 19:30	Report	Score by quarters: 1–3, 1–4, 0–3, 1–3			Çiftlikköy Campus Swimming Pool, Mersin; Referees: Miskovic (SRB) and Collantoni (ITA)
June 21, 2013; 19:30	Report	3 players, 1	Goals	Español, Cercols 3	Çiftlikköy Campus Swimming Pool, Mersin; Referees: Miskovic (SRB) and Collantoni (ITA)

June 22, 2013; 19:30	Report	Turkey	4–17	Croatia	Çiftlikköy Campus Swimming Pool, Mersin; Referees: Miskovic (SRB) and Collantoni (ITA)
June 22, 2013; 19:30	Report	Score by quarters: 1–5, 1–6, 1–4, 1–2			Çiftlikköy Campus Swimming Pool, Mersin; Referees: Miskovic (SRB) and Collantoni (ITA)
June 22, 2013; 19:30	Report	Hantal 2	Goals	Muslim 5	Çiftlikköy Campus Swimming Pool, Mersin; Referees: Miskovic (SRB) and Collantoni (ITA)

Elimination stage

Crossover

June 23, 2013; 16:30	Report	Serbia	9–8 (OT)	Turkey	Çiftlikköy Campus Swimming Pool, Mersin; Referees: Reemnet (NED) and Collantoni (ITA)
June 23, 2013; 16:30	Report	Score by quarters: 1–1, 0–2, 2–3, 5–2 OT: (0–0, 1–0)			Çiftlikköy Campus Swimming Pool, Mersin; Referees: Reemnet (NED) and Collantoni (ITA)
June 23, 2013; 16:30	Report	Stojanovic 3	Goals	Šutalo 4	Çiftlikköy Campus Swimming Pool, Mersin; Referees: Reemnet (NED) and Collantoni (ITA)

Final standing

Rank	Team	Record
7	Turkey	0–3

== Weightlifting ==
=== Men ===
Athlete	Event	Snatch		Clean & Jerk	
Athlete	Event	Result	Rank	Result	Rank
Bünyamin Sezer	−62 kg	135	1st place, gold medalist(s)	151	2nd place, silver medalist(s)
Ekrem Ağıllı	−69 kg	136	4	155	5
Semih Yağcı	−77 kg	151	2nd place, silver medalist(s)		
Nezir Sağır	−85 kg			193	2nd place, silver medalist(s)

=== Women ===
Athlete	Event	Snatch		Clean & Jerk	
Athlete	Event	Result	Rank	Result	Rank
Sibel Özkan	−48 kg	78	2nd place, silver medalist(s)		
Ayşegül Çoban	−53 kg	82	2nd place, silver medalist(s)	110	1st place, gold medalist(s)
Emine Şensoy Çetintürk	−53 kg	82	1st place, gold medalist(s)	96	2nd place, silver medalist(s)
Aylin Daşdelen	−58 kg	87	1st place, gold medalist(s)	113	1st place, gold medalist(s)
Sibel Şimşek	−63 kg	100	1st place, gold medalist(s)	121	2nd place, silver medalist(s)
Sümeyye Kentli	−69 kg				
Figen Kaya	−75 kg			108	3rd place, bronze medalist(s)

== Wrestling ==
Men's Freestyle

Athlete	Event	Quarterfinal	Semifinal	Repechage 1	Final / BM	Rank
Ahmet Peker	−55 kg	(France) Zoheir El Ouarraqe; L 0–2 PO		(Spain) Juan P. Gonzales; W 2–0 PO		3rd place, bronze medalist(s)
Erhan Bakır	−60 kg	(Greece) Theodosios Valkaniotis; W 2–0 ST	(Egypt) Ibrahim Mohamed; W 2–0 PP		(Morocco) Hamza Fatah; W 2–0 PO	1st place, gold medalist(s)
Mustafa Kaya	−66 kg	(Albania) Rabah Si Ramdane; W 2–0 PO	(North Macedonia) Dejan Mitrov; W 2–0 PO		(Greece) Andreas Triantafyllidis; W 2–0 PP	1st place, gold medalist(s)
Soner Demirtaş	−74 kg	(Greece) Georgios Savvoulidis; W 2–0 PP	(France) Luca Lampis; W 2–1 PP		(Egypt) Abdou Ahmed; W 2–0 PP	1st place, gold medalist(s)
Serdar Böke	−84 kg	(Tunisia) Adnen Rhimi; W 2–0 PO	(Greece) Timofei Xenidis; W 2–0 PP		(North Macedonia) Dejan Bogdanov; W 2–0 PP	1st place, gold medalist(s)
Rıza Yıldırım	−96 kg	(Greece) Micheil Tsikovani; W 2–0 PP	(Albania) Egzon Shala; W 2–0 PP		(Tunisia) Rochdi Rhimi; W 2–0 PO	1st place, gold medalist(s)
Taha Akgül	−120 kg	(Syria) Raja Alkrad; W 2–0 PO	(Greece) Christos Nyfadopoulos; W 2–0 PO		(Tunisia) Slim Trabelsi; W 2–0 VB	1st place, gold medalist(s)

Men's Greco-Roman

Athlete	Event	1/8 Final	Quarterfinal	Semifinal	Final / BM	Rank
Fatih Üçüncü	−55 kg		(Albania) Billel Benerih; W 2–0 PO	(Italy) Federico Manea; W 2–0 PO	(Egypt) Haithem Mahmoud; L 1–2 PP	2nd place, silver medalist(s)
Mevlüt Arık	−60 kg		(Algeria) Mouatez Djedaiet; W 2–0 PO	(Italy) Lorenzo Gentile; W 2–0 PO	(France) Tarik Belmadani; T 0–0 VB	1st place, gold medalist(s)
Atakan Yüksel	−66 kg		(Egypt) Hussein Hendy; W 2–0 PO	(Croatia) Dominik Etlinger; W 2–1 PP	(Serbia) Aleksandar Maksimovic; W 2–0 PO	1st place, gold medalist(s)
Erhan Kuş	−74 kg		(Greece) Petros Manouilidis; W 2–0 PO	(Egypt) Tarek Mohamed; W 2–1 PP	(Croatia) Neven Zugaj; W 2–0 PO	1st place, gold medalist(s)
Selçuk Çebi	−84 kg		(Albania) Ergys Mirukaj; W 2–0 PP	(Tunisia) Haikel Achourij; W 2–0 PP	(France) Samba Diongj; W 2–0 PO	1st place, gold medalist(s)
Cenk İldem	−96 kg	(Bosnia and Herzegovina) Elvir Cosic; W 2–0 PO	(Egypt) Ahmed Saad; W 2–0 PO	(Morocco) Reda Hinani; W 2–0 PO	(France) Melonin Noumonvi; T 1–1 PO	2nd place, silver medalist(s)
Rıza Kayaalp	−120 kg		BYE	(Egypt) Mohamed Mohamedj; W 2–0 PO	(Tunisia) Radhwen Chebbij; W 2–0 PO	1st place, gold medalist(s)

Women's Freestyle

Athlete	Event	Nordic Pool 1	Nordic Pool 2	Nordic Pool 3	Nordic Pool 4	Semifinal	Final / BM	Rank
Sümeyye Sezer	−48 kg	(France) Julie Sabatie; W 2–0 PP	(Italy) Silvia Felice; L 0–2 PP	(Tunisia) Maroi Mezien; W 2–0 PP				2nd place, silver medalist(s)
Burcu Kebiç	−51 kg					(Greece) Evdoxia Pavlidou; W 1–0 VT	(France) Melanie Lesaffre; L 0–2 PO	2nd place, silver medalist(s)
Leyla Metin	−55 kg	(Greece) Maria Prevolaraki; L 0–2 PP	(France) Aurelie Basseti; L 1–2 PP	(Tunisia) Marwa Amri; L 0–2 PO	(Italy) Valentina Minguzzi; L 0–2 VT			
Hafize Şahin	−59 kg	(France) Maite Pivat; W 2–0 PO	(Tunisia) Hela Riabi; W 2–1 PP	(Egypt) Haiat Youssef; W 2–0 PP	(Spain) Karima Sanchez; W 1–0 VT			1st place, gold medalist(s)
Elif Jale Yeşilırmak	−63 kg					(Greece) Agoro Papavasileiou; T 1–1 VT	(Italy) Maria Diana; W 2–0 PO	1st place, gold medalist(s)
Yasemin Adar	−72 kg	(Spain) Aurora Fajardo; W 2–0 PO	(Egypt) Nadia Ahmed; W 2–0 VT	(Greece) Maria Louiza Vryoni; T 0–0 VB				1st place, gold medalist(s)
