= Table tennis at the 2015 European Games – Qualification =

A total of 128 qualifying places are available for table tennis at the 2015 European Games, 64 players per gender.

== Qualification summary ==
NOC	Men's Singles	Men's Team	Women's Singles	Women's Team	Total Athletes
Austria	2	X	2	X	6
Azerbaijan	2	X	2	X	6
Belarus	2	X	2	X	6
Belgium	2		1		3
Bosnia and Herzegovina	1				1
Croatia	2	X	2		5
Cyprus			1		1
Czech Republic	2	X	2	X	6
Denmark	2				2
France	2	X	2	X	6
Germany	2	X	2	X	6
Great Britain	2		2		4
Greece	2	X			3
Hungary	2	X	2	X	6
Israel			1		1
Italy	2				2
Latvia	1				1
Lithuania			1		1
Luxembourg			2	X	3
Netherlands			2	X	3
Poland	2	X	2	X	6
Portugal	2	X	2	X	6
Romania	2	X	2	X	6
Russia	2	X	2	X	6
San Marino			1		1
Serbia	2		2	X	5
Slovakia	2		2		4
Slovenia	1		1		2
Spain	2	X	2		5
Sweden	2	X	2	X	6
Switzerland			1		1
Turkey	1		1		2
Ukraine	2	X	2	X	6
33 NOCs	48	16	48	16	128

== Qualification timeline ==
Event	Date	Venue
2014 Table Tennis European Championships	22–28 September 2014	(Portugal) Lisbon
ITTF Ranking Date	1 March 2015	

== Qualification progress ==
=== Singles ===
Limited to two athletes per nation.

Meaning of qualification	Total places	Total players per NOC	Men	Women
Host nation	2	2	Azerbaijan	Azerbaijan
Top 14 teams at the 2014 European Championships; Championships Division	28	2	Austria; Belarus; Croatia; Czech Republic; France; Germany; Greece; Hungary; Poland; Portugal; Romania; Russia; Spain; Sweden	Austria; Belarus; Czech Republic; France; Germany; Hungary; Luxembourg; Netherlands; Poland; Portugal; Romania; Russia; Sweden; Ukraine
First teams at the 2014 European Championships; Challenge Division	2	2	Ukraine	Serbia
ITTF European Ranking	16/14	1	Paul Drinkhall (GBR); Bojan Tokic (SLO); Liam Pitchford (GBR); Mihai Bobocica (ITA); Yang Wang (SVK); Ahmet Li (TUR); Niagol Stoyanov (ITA); Aleksandar Karakašević (SRB); Žolt Pete (SRB); Matiss Burgis (LAT); Lubomir Pistej (SVK); Cedric Nuytinck (BEL); Jean-Michel Saive (BEL); Jonathan Groth (DEN); Kasper Sternberg (DEN); Admir Duranspahic (BIH)	Melek Hu (TUR); Yanfei Shen (ESP); Tian Yuan (CRO); Ruta Paskauskiene (LTU); Barbora Balazova (SVK); Lea Rakovac (CRO); Galia Dvorak (ESP); Eva Odorova (SVK); Alex Galic (SLO); Rachel Moret (SUI); Nicole Trosman (ISR); Lisa Lung (BEL); Tin-Tin Ho (GBR); Charlotte Carey (GBR)
Universality places	0/2	1		Letizia Giardi (SMR); TBA (CYP)
Total			48 athletes	48 athletes

=== Teams ===
A team consists of three players. Two of the players compete in the singles event.

Meaning of qualification	Total places	Men	Women
Host nation	1	Azerbaijan	Azerbaijan
2014 European Championships Championships Division	14	Germany; Portugal; Croatia; Sweden; Russia; Belarus; France; Spain; Poland; Hungary; Austria; Greece; Czech Republic; Romania	Germany; Austria; Sweden; Poland; Hungary; Netherlands; Romania; Belarus; Czech Republic; France; Russia; Portugal; Luxembourg; Ukraine
2014 European Championships Challenge Division	1	Ukraine	Serbia
Total		16	16
