= 2016 European Table Tennis Championships – Men's singles =

The men's singles on 2016 European Table Tennis Championships were held in Budapest, Hungary from 18–22 October 2016. Venue for the competition is Tüskecsarnok.

== Results ==
=== Finals ===
Quarterfinals			Semifinals			Final
19	Jakub Dyjas (POL)	4
15	Kou Lei (UKR)	1	19	Jakub Dyjas (POL)	1
16	Emmanuel Lebesson (FRA)	4	16	Emmanuel Lebesson (FRA)	4
3	Marcos Freitas (POR)	2				16	Emmanuel Lebesson (FRA)	4
4	Timo Boll (GER)	4				6	Simon Gauzy (FRA)	1
32	Benedek Olah (FIN)	2	4	Timo Boll (GER)	1
6	Simon Gauzy (FRA)	4	6	Simon Gauzy (FRA)	4
21	Robert Gardos (AUT)	2

== Top half ==
First round
1	Dimitrij Ovtcharov (GER)	4
Marc Duran (ESP)	0
Mikhail Paikov (RUS)	2
19	Jakub Dyjas (POL)	4
20	João Monteiro (POR)	4
Benjamin Brossier (FRA)	1
Darko Jorgic (SLO)	3
10	Panagiotis Gionis (GRE)	4
15	Kou Lei (UKR)	4
Samuel Walker (ENG)	0
Bai He (SVK)	dsq
26	Ahmet Li (TUR)
24	Adrian Crişan (ROU)	2
Anton Kallberg (SWE)	4
Mihai Bobocica (ITA)	1
8	Andrej Gaćina (CRO)	4

Second round
1	Dimitrij Ovtcharov (GER)	2
19	Jakub Dyjas (POL)	4
20	João Monteiro (POR)	4
10	Panagiotis Gionis (GRE)	0
15	Kou Lei (UKR)	4
26	Ahmet Li (TUR)	0
Anton Kallberg (SWE)	4
8	Andrej Gaćina (CRO)	3

Third round
19	Jakub Dyjas (POL)	4
20	João Monteiro (POR)	1
15	Kou Lei (UKR)	4
Anton Kallberg (SWE)	2

Quarterfinals
19	Jakub Dyjas (POL)	4
15	Kou Lei (UKR)	1

First round
7	Stefan Fegerl (AUT)	4
Sadi Ismailov (RUS)	0
Tomasz Lewandowski (POL)	1
22	Liam Pitchford (ENG)	4
25	Patrick Franziska (GER)	4
Leonardo Mutti (ITA)	2
Robin Devos (BEL)	0
16	Emmanuel Lebesson (FRA)	4
11	Kristian Karlsson (SWE)	4
Carlos Machado (ESP)	1
Aliaksandr Khanin (BLR)	4
29	Tomáš Konečný (CZE)	3
27	Grigory Vlasov (RUS)	1
Benedikt Duda (GER)	4
Adam Szudi (HUN)	0
3	Marco Freitas (POR)	4

Second round
7	Stefan Fegerl (AUT)	4
22	Liam Pitchford (ENG)	3
25	Patrick Franziska (GER)	1
16	Emmanuel Lebesson (FRA)	4
11	Kristian Karlsson (SWE)	4
Aliaksandr Khanin (BLR)	1
Benedikt Duda (GER)	3
3	Marco Freitas (POR)	4

Third round
7	Stefan Fegerl (AUT)	2
16	Emmanuel Lebesson (FRA)	4
11	Kristian Karlsson (SWE)	1
3	Marco Freitas (POR)	4

Quarterfinals
16	Emmanuel Lebesson (FRA)	4
3	Marco Freitas (POR)	2

== Bottom half ==
First round
4	Timo Boll (GER)	4
Daniel Habesohn (AUT)	0
Viktor Yefimov (UKR)	1
18	Pär Gerell (SWE)	4
23	Wang Yang (SVK)	0
Dmitrij Prokopcov (CZE)	4
Tomislav Pucar (CRO)	3
12	Jonathan Groth (DEN)	4
14	Bojan Tokic (SLO)	4
Konstantinos Papageorgiou] (GRE)	1
David Serdaroglu (AUT)	0
32	Benedek Olah (FIN)	4
30	Daniel Górak (POL)	4
Cedric Nuytinck (BEL)	2
Hunor Szocs (ROU)	4
5	Tiago Apolonia (POR)	2

Second round
4	Timo Boll (GER)	4
18	Pär Gerell (SWE)	0
Dmitrij Prokopcov (CZE)	2
12	Jonathan Groth (DEN)	4
14	Bojan Tokic (SLO)	2
32	Benedek Olah (FIN)	4
30	Daniel Górak (POL)	4
Hunor Szocs (ROU)	2

Third round
4	Timo Boll (GER)	4
12	Jonathan Groth (DEN)	3
32	Benedek Olah (FIN)	4
30	Daniel Górak (POL)	2

Quarterfinals
4	Timo Boll (GER)	4
32	Benedek Olah (FIN)	2

First round
6	Simon Gauzy (FRA)	4
Jesus Cantero (ESP)	1
Lubomír Jančařík (CZE)	3
31	João Geraldo (POR)	4
28	Ovidiu Ionescu (ROU)	4
Aleksandar Karakašević (SRB)	2
Pavel Platonov (BLR)	2
9	Alexander Shibaev (RUS)	4
13	Paul Drinkhall (ENG)	4
Ioannis Sgouropoulos (GRE)	1
Steffen Mengel (GER)	2
21	Robert Gardos (AUT)	4
17	Mattias Karlsson (SWE)	4
Adam Pattantyus (HUN)	2
Elia Schmid (SUI)	1
2	Vladimir Samsonov (BLR)	4

Second round
6	Simon Gauzy (FRA)	4
31	João Geraldo (POR)	1
28	Ovidiu Ionescu (ROU)	3
9	Alexander Shibaev (RUS)	4
13	Paul Drinkhall (ENG)	3
21	Robert Gardos (AUT)	4
17	Mattias Karlsson (SWE)	2
2	Vladimir Samsonov (BLR)	4

Third round
6	Simon Gauzy (FRA)	4
9	Alexander Shibaev (RUS)	2
21	Robert Gardos (AUT)	4
2	Vladimir Samsonov (BLR)	3

Quarterfinals
6	Simon Gauzy (FRA)	4
21	Robert Gardos (AUT)	2
