= 2016 European Table Tennis Championships – Mixed doubles =

The mixed doubles on 2016 European Table Tennis Championships were held in Budapest, Hungary from 18–22 October 2016. Venue for the competition is Tüskecsarnok.

== Results ==
=== Finals ===
Semifinals
1	Aleksandar Karakašević (SRB); Rūta Paškauskienė (LTU)	1
3	Mattias Karlsson (SWE); Matilda Ekholm (SWE)	3
10	Ovidiu Ionescu (ROU); Bernadette Szőcs (ROU)	0
4	João Monteiro (POR); Daniela Monteiro Dodean (ROU)	3

Final
3	Mattias Karlsson (SWE); Matilda Ekholm (SWE)	2
4	João Monteiro (POR); Daniela Monteiro Dodean (ROU)	3

=== Top half ===
First round
1	Aleksandar Karakašević (SRB); Rūta Paškauskienė (LTU)	3
Kirill Skachkov (RUS); Eva Ódorová (SVK)	1
Adam Szudi (HUN); Szandra Pergel (HUN)	3
9	Chen Weixing (AUT); Sofia Polcanova (AUT)	2
11	Benedek Olah (FIN); Georgina Pota (HUN)	3
Benjamin Brossier (FRA); Stephanie Loeuillette (FRA)	1
Elia Schmid (SUI); Rahel Aschwanden (SUI)	0
5	Ahmet Li (TUR); Melek Hu (TUR)	3
7	Wang Yang (SVK); Polina Mikhailova (RUS)	3
Pavel Platonov (BLR); Viktoria Pavlovich (BLR)	2
Liam Pitchford (ENG); Tin-Tin Ho (ENG)	3
14	João Geraldo (POR); Yu Fu (POR)	2
8	Jakub Dyjas (POL); Katarzyna Grzybowska-Franc (POL)	3
Alvaro Robles (ESP); Galia Dvorak (ESP)	0
Benedikt Duda (GER); Sabine Winter (GER)	0
3	Mattias Karlsson (SWE); Matilda Ekholm (SWE)	3

Second round
1	Aleksandar Karakašević (SRB); Rūta Paškauskienė (LTU)	3
Adam Szudi (HUN); Szandra Pergel (HUN)	2
11	Benedek Olah (FIN); Georgina Pota (HUN)	3
5	Ahmet Li (TUR); Melek Hu (TUR)	2
7	Wang Yang (SVK); Polina Mikhailova (RUS)	1
Liam Pitchford (ENG); Tin-Tin Ho (ENG)	3
8	Jakub Dyjas (POL); Katarzyna Grzybowska-Franc (POL)	0
3	Mattias Karlsson (SWE); Matilda Ekholm (SWE)	3

Quarterfinals
1	Aleksandar Karakašević (SRB); Rūta Paškauskienė (LTU)	3
11	Benedek Olah (FIN); Georgina Pota (HUN)	1
Liam Pitchford (ENG); Tin-Tin Ho (ENG)	0
3	Mattias Karlsson (SWE); Matilda Ekholm (SWE)	3

Semifinals
1	Aleksandar Karakašević (SRB); Rūta Paškauskienė (LTU)	1
3	Mattias Karlsson (SWE); Matilda Ekholm (SWE)	3

=== Bottom half ===
First round
Ľubomír Pištej (SVK); Barbora Balážová (SVK)
Niagol Stoyanov (ITA); Debora Vivarelli (ITA)	wo
Eric Glod (LUX); Sarah De Nutte (LUX)	0
10	Ovidiu Ionescu (ROU); Bernadette Szőcs (ROU)	3
13	Paul Drinkhall (ENG); Kelly Sibley (ENG)
Tomáš Konečný (CZE); Hana Matelová (CZE)	wo
Grigory Vlasov (RUS); Yana Noskova (RUS)	2
6	Panagiotis Gionis (GRE); Tetyana Bilenko (UKR)	3
4	João Monteiro (POR); Daniela Monteiro Dodean (ROU)	3
Aleksandr Smirnov (EST); Anna Kirichenko (FIN)	0
Krisztián Nagy (HUN); Andrea Pavlovic (CRO)	2
Laurens Tromers (NED); Britt Eerland (NED)	3
12	Steffen Mengel (GER); Kristin Silbereisen (GER)	3
Denislav Kodjabashev (BUL); Maria Yovkova (BUL)
Jesus Cantero (ESP); Maria Xiao (ESP)	3
2	Robert Gardos (AUT); Liu Jia (AUT)	1

Second round
Niagol Stoyanov (ITA); Debora Vivarelli (ITA)	0
10	Ovidiu Ionescu (ROU); Bernadette Szőcs (ROU)	3
Tomáš Konečný (CZE); Hana Matelová (CZE)	1
6	Panagiotis Gionis (GRE); Tetyana Bilenko (UKR)	3
4	João Monteiro (POR); Daniela Monteiro Dodean (ROU)	3
Laurens Tromers (NED); Britt Eerland (NED)	0
12	Steffen Mengel (GER); Kristin Silbereisen (GER)	0
Jesus Cantero (ESP); Maria Xiao (ESP)	3

Quarterfinals
10	Ovidiu Ionescu (ROU); Bernadette Szőcs (ROU)	3
6	Panagiotis Gionis (GRE); Tetyana Bilenko (UKR)	0
4	João Monteiro (POR); Daniela Monteiro Dodean (ROU)	3
Jesus Cantero (ESP); Maria Xiao (ESP)	2

Semifinals
10	Ovidiu Ionescu (ROU); Bernadette Szőcs (ROU)	0
4	João Monteiro (POR); Daniela Monteiro Dodean (ROU)	3
