= 2013 European Table Tennis Championships =

- Date: 4 – 13 October
- Location: Schwechat, Austria
- Venue: Multiversum, Werner Schlager Academy
- European Table Tennis Championships

The 2013 European Table Tennis Championships were held in Schwechat, Austria from 4–13 October 2013. Venue for the competition is Multiversum.

== Medal summary ==
=== Men's events ===
Event	Gold	Silver	Bronze
Team	Germany; Patrick Franziska; Dimitrij Ovtcharov; Patrick Baum; Ruwen Filus; Bastian Steger	Greece; Kalinikos Kreanga; Panagiotis Gionis; Anastasios Riniotis; Konstantinos Papageorgiu	Belarus; Vladimir Samsonov; Evgueni Chtchetinine; Pavel Platonov; Aliaksandr Khanin; Vadim Yarashenka
Team	Germany; Patrick Franziska; Dimitrij Ovtcharov; Patrick Baum; Ruwen Filus; Bastian Steger	Greece; Kalinikos Kreanga; Panagiotis Gionis; Anastasios Riniotis; Konstantinos Papageorgiu	Russia; Alexey Liventsov; Alexander Shibaev; Kirill Skachkov; Alexey Smirnov; Grigory Vlasov
Singles	Dimitrij Ovtcharov; Germany	Vladimir Samsonov; Belarus	Bastian Steger; Germany
Singles	Dimitrij Ovtcharov; Germany	Vladimir Samsonov; Belarus	Panagiotis Gionis; Greece
Doubles	Wang Zeng Yi / Tan Ruiwu; Poland / Croatia	Robert Gardos / Daniel Habesohn; Austria	He Zhi Wen / Carlos Machado; Spain
Doubles	Wang Zeng Yi / Tan Ruiwu; Poland / Croatia	Robert Gardos / Daniel Habesohn; Austria	João Monteiro / Tiago Apolonia; Portugal

=== Women's events ===
Event	Gold	Silver	Bronze
Team	Germany; Wu Jiaduo; Han Ying; Shan Xiaona; Kristin Silbereisen; Petrissa Solja	Romania; Daniela Dodean; Elizabeta Samara; Bernadette Szőcs; Iulia Necula; Camelia Poștoacă	Czech Republic; Dana Čechová; Hana Matelová; Kateřina Pěnkavová; Renáta Štrbíková; Iveta Vacenovská
Team	Germany; Wu Jiaduo; Han Ying; Shan Xiaona; Kristin Silbereisen; Petrissa Solja	Romania; Daniela Dodean; Elizabeta Samara; Bernadette Szőcs; Iulia Necula; Camelia Poștoacă	Russia; Olga Baranova; Polina Mikhaylova; Yana Noskova; Anna Tikhomirova; Elena Troshneva
Singles	Li Fen; Sweden	Shan Xiaona; Germany	Fu Yu; Portugal
Singles	Li Fen; Sweden	Shan Xiaona; Germany	Han Ying; Germany
Doubles	Petrissa Solja / Sabine Winter; Germany	Zhenqi Barthel / Shan Xiaona; Germany	Sara Ramírez / Shen Yanfei; Spain
Doubles	Petrissa Solja / Sabine Winter; Germany	Zhenqi Barthel / Shan Xiaona; Germany	Galia Dvorak / Matilda Ekholm; Spain / Sweden

== Medal table ==
Rank	Nation	Gold	Silver	Bronze	Total
1	Germany (GER)	4	2	2	8
2	Sweden (SWE)	1	0	0.5	1.5
3	Croatia (CRO)	0.5	0	0	0.5
3	Poland (POL)	0.5	0	0	0.5
5	Belarus (BLR)	0	1	1	2
5	Greece (GRE)	0	1	1	2
7	Austria (AUT)	0	1	0	1
7	Romania (ROU)	0	1	0	1
9	Spain (ESP)	0	0	2.5	2.5
10	Portugal (POR)	0	0	2	2
10	Russia (RUS)	0	0	2	2
12	Czech Republic (CZE)	0	0	1	1
Totals (12 entries)		6	6	12	24

== Results ==
=== Men's singles ===
Round 3
1	Dimitrij Ovtcharov (GER)	4
Pavel Platonov (BLR)	0
Mihai Bobocica (ITA)	2
Quentin Robinot (FRA)	4
Bastian Steger (GER)	4
Alexander Shibaev (RUS)	2
Adrien Mattenet (FRA)	2
Ruwen Filus (GER)	4
Patrick Baum (GER)	1
Tiago Apolonia (POR)	4
Kirill Skachkov (RUS)	3
Panagiotis Gionis (GRE)	4
Stefan Fegerl (AUT)	4
Alexey Leventsov (RUS)	1
Tan Ruiwu (CRO)	0
2	Vladimir Samsonov (BLR)	4

Quarterfinals
1	Dimitrij Ovtcharov (GER)	4
Quentin Robinot (FRA)	1
Bastian Steger (GER)	4
Ruwen Filus (GER)	1
Tiago Apolonia (POR)	2
Panagiotis Gionis (GRE)	4
Stefan Fegerl (AUT)	1
2	Vladimir Samsonov (BLR)	4

Semifinals
1	Dimitrij Ovtcharov (GER)	4
Bastian Steger (GER)	2
Panagiotis Gionis (GRE)	2
2	Vladimir Samsonov (BLR)	4

Final
1	Dimitrij Ovtcharov (GER)	4
2	Vladimir Samsonov (BLR)	0

=== Men's doubles ===
Quarterfinals
1	Robert Gardos (AUT); Daniel Habesohn (AUT)	4
Marcos Freitas (POR); Andrej Gacina (CRO)	0
He Zhi Wen (ESP); Carlos Machado (ESP)	4
Alexey Liventsov (RUS); Mikhail Paykov (RUS)	3
João Monteiro (POR); Tiago Apolonia (POR)	4
Ahmet Li (TUR); Bora Vang (TUR)	1
Marko Jevtović (SRB); Žolt Pete (SRB)	1
Wang Zeng Yi (POL); Tan Ruiwu (CRO)	4

Semifinals
1	Robert Gardos (AUT); Daniel Habesohn (AUT)	4
He Zhi Wen (ESP); Carlos Machado (ESP)	2
João Monteiro (POR); Tiago Apolonia (POR)	2
Wang Zeng Yi (POL); Tan Ruiwu (CRO)	4

Final
1	Robert Gardos (AUT); Daniel Habesohn (AUT)	1
Wang Zeng Yi (POL); Tan Ruiwu (CRO)	4

=== Men's team ===
Quarterfinals
Portugal	1
Greece	3
Belarus	3
Croatia	1
France	0
Germany	3
Sweden	0
Russia	3

Semifinals
Greece	3
Belarus	2
Germany	3
Russia	0

Final
Greece	1
Germany	3

=== Women's singles ===
Round 3
1	Shen Yanfei (ESP)	4
Bernadette Szőcs (ROU)	2
Li Xue (FRA)	3
Li Fen (SWE)	4
Katrin Silbereisen (GER)	3
Fu Yu (POR)	4
Daniela Dodean (ROU)	2
Li Jiao (NED)	4
Elizabeta Samara (ROU)	2
Shan Xiaona (GER)	4
Melek Hu (TUR)	4
Iveta Vacenovská (CZE)	3
Han Ying (GER)	4
Margaryta Pesotska (UKR)	1
Matilda Ekholm (SWE)	1
2	Viktoria Pavlovich (BLR)	4

Quarterfinals
1	Shen Yanfei (ESP)	0
Li Fen (SWE)	4
Fu Yu (POR)	4
Li Jiao (NED)	1
Shan Xiaona (GER)	4
Melek Hu (TUR)	2
Han Ying (GER)	4
2	Viktoria Pavlovich (BLR)	3

Semifinals
Li Fen (SWE)	4
Fu Yu (POR)	2
Shan Xiaona (GER)	4
Han Ying (GER)	1

Final
Li Fen (SWE)	4
Shan Xiaona (GER)	2

=== Women's doubles ===
Quarterfinals
Sara Ramirez (ESP); Shen Yanfei (ESP)	4
Sarah de Nutte (LUX); Ni Xia Lian (LUX)	2
Tetyana Bilenko (UKR); Viktoria Pavlovich (BLR)	2
Zhenqi Barthel (GER); Shan Xiaona (GER)	4
Cristina Hîrîci (ROU); Bernadette Szocs (ROU)	2
Petrissa Solja (GER); Sabine Winter (GER)	4
Katerina Penkavova (CZE); Iveta Vacenovska (CZE)	2
Galia Dvorak (ESP); Matilda Ekholm (SWE)	4

Semifinals
Sara Ramirez (ESP); Shen Yanfei (ESP)	3
Zhenqi Barthel (GER); Shan Xiaona (GER)	4
Petrissa Solja (GER); Sabine Winter (GER)	4
Galia Dvorak (ESP); Matilda Ekholm (SWE)	3

Final
Zhenqi Barthel (GER); Shan Xiaona (GER)	2
Petrissa Solja (GER); Sabine Winter (GER)	4

=== Women's team ===
Quarterfinals
Hungary	0
Romania	3
Poland	1
Russia	3
Belarus	2
Czech Republic	3
Austria	0
Germany	3

Semifinals
Romania	3
Russia	0
Czech Republic	1
Germany	3

Final
Romania	1
Germany	3
