= Table tennis at the 2013 Mediterranean Games =

- Venue: CNR Mersin Yenişehir Exhibition Centre
- Dates: 25-29 June 2013

The table tennis competitions at the 2013 Mediterranean Games in Mersin took place between 25 June and 29 June at the CNR Mersin Yenişehir Exhibition Centre Hall A.

Athletes competed in 2 individual and 2 team events.

== Medal table ==
* Host nation (Turkey)

Rank	Nation	Gold	Silver	Bronze	Total
1	Turkey*	2	1	1	4
2	Spain	1	1	2	4
3	Egypt	1	0	1	2
4	France	0	1	0	1
4	Italy	0	1	0	1
Totals (5 entries)		4	4	4	12

== Medal summary ==
=== Medalists ===
Event	Gold	Silver	Bronze
Men's singles	Omar Assar; Egypt	Bora Vang; Turkey	Ahmet Li; Turkey
Men's team	Bora Vang; Turkey; Ahmet Li; Turkey; Gencay Menge; Turkey	Mihai Bobocica; Italy; Marco Rech Daldosso; Italy; Niagol Stoyanov; Italy	He Zhi Wen; Spain; Carlos Machado; Spain
Women's singles	Melek Hu; Turkey	Sara Ramírez; Spain	Shen Yanfei; Spain
Women's team	Sara Ramírez; Spain; Shen Yanfei; Spain	Li Xue; France; Xian Yi Fang; France	Nadeen Eldawlatly; Egypt; Farah Hassan; Egypt; Dina Meshref; Egypt
