= Karate at the 2013 Mediterranean Games =

- Venue: Edip Buran Arena

The karate competitions at the 2013 Mediterranean Games in Mersin took place between 28 June and 29 June at the Edip Buran Sport Hall.

Athletes competed in 10 weight categories. Turkey was the most successful nation with 6 gold and 2 silver medals.

== Medal summary ==
=== Men's events ===
Event	Gold	Silver	Bronze
Kumite (60 kg)	Luca Maresca (ITA)	Mohamed Ali (EGY)	El Mehdi Benrouida (MAR); Johan Lopes (FRA)
Kumite (67 kg)	Ömer Kemaloğlu (TUR)	Redouan Koussekssou (MAR)	Magdy Mohamed (EGY); Mohamed Boudis (ALG)
Kumite (75 kg)	Serkan Yağcı (TUR)	Fernando Moreno (ESP)	Luigi Busà (ITA); Ahmed Solyman (EGY)
Kumite (84 kg)	Hany Keshta (EGY)	Georgios Tzanos (GRE)	Nello Maestri (ITA); Juš Markač (SLO)
Kumite (+84 kg)	Stefano Maniscalco (ITA)	Enes Erkan (TUR)	Missipsa Hamadimi (ALG); Mohanad Mohammed (EGY)

=== Women's events ===
Event	Gold	Silver	Bronze
Kumite (50 kg)	Serap Özçelik (TUR)	Areeg Rashed (EGY)	Giorgia Gargano (ITA); Alexandra Recchia (FRA)
Kumite (55 kg)	Tuba Yenen (TUR)	Lucie Ignace (FRA)	Marta Armentia (ESP); Selene Guglielmia (ITA)
Kumite (61 kg)	Giana Lotfy (EGY)	Bahar Erşeker (TUR)	Laura Pasqua (ITA); Lucile Breton (FRA)
Kumite (68 kg)	Hafsa Şeyda Burucu (TUR)	Irene Colomar (ESP)	Alizée Agier (FRA); Azra Saleš (CRO)
Kumite (+68 kg)	Meltem Hocaoğlu (TUR)	Shymaa Al Sayed (EGY)	Nadège Ait-Ibrahim (FRA); Greta Vitelli (ITA)

=== Medal table ===
* Host nation (Turkey)

Rank	Nation	Gold	Silver	Bronze	Total
1	Turkey*	6	2	0	8
2	Egypt	2	3	3	8
3	Italy	2	0	6	8
4	Spain	0	2	1	3
5	France	0	1	5	6
6	Morocco	0	1	1	2
7	Greece	0	1	0	1
8	Algeria	0	0	2	2
9	Croatia	0	0	1	1
9	Slovenia	0	0	1	1
Totals (10 entries)		10	10	20	40
