= 2014 European Table Tennis Championships =

- Date: 24–28 September 2014
- Location: Lisbon, Portugal
- Venue: MEO Arena
- European Table Tennis Championships

The 2014 European Table Tennis Championships were held in Lisbon, Portugal from 24–28 September 2014. The venue for the competition was MEO Arena. The competition only had team events for men and women. The competition also served as qualification event for the 2015 European Games. The Portuguese team won the Championship for the first time.

== Participating teams ==
Division groupings were based on placements in the 2013 European Championships.

Division	Men's team	Women's team
Championships division	Germany; Greece; Belarus; Russia; Sweden; Croatia; Portugal; France Austria; Spain; Poland; Czech Republic; Italy; Romania; Slovakia; Hungary	Germany; Romania; Czech Republic; Russia; Hungary; Belarus; Austria; Poland France; Spain; Ukraine; Netherlands; Turkey; Sweden; Luxembourg; Portugal
Challenge division	Ukraine; Slovenia; England; Serbia; Turkey; Belgium; Denmark; Bulgaria Switzerland; Lithuania; Luxembourg; Estonia; Finland; Norway; Ireland; Latvia	England; Croatia; Serbia; Slovakia; Italy; Slovenia; Lithuania; Greece Bulgaria; Wales; Denmark; Switzerland; Estonia; Finland; Norway; Scotland
Standard division	Israel; Netherlands; Wales; Montenegro; Azerbaijan; Cyprus Iceland; Scotland; Malta; San Marino; Jersey	Israel; Belgium; Montenegro; Kosovo; Malta

== Medal summary ==
Event	Gold	Silver	Bronze
Men's team	Portugal; Tiago Apolónia; Diogo Chen; Marcos Freitas; João Geraldo; João Monteiro	Germany; Patrick Baum; Timo Boll; Patrick Franziska; Steffen Mengel; Dimitrij Ovtcharov	Sweden; Harald Andersson; Pär Gerell; Kristian Karlsson; Jens Lundqvist; Jon Persson
Men's team	Portugal; Tiago Apolónia; Diogo Chen; Marcos Freitas; João Geraldo; João Monteiro	Germany; Patrick Baum; Timo Boll; Patrick Franziska; Steffen Mengel; Dimitrij Ovtcharov	Croatia; Andrej Gaćina; Frane Tomislav Kojić; Tomislav Kolarek; Tomislav Pucar; Tan Ruiwu
Women's team	Germany; Han Ying; Irene Ivancan; Shan Xiaona; Petrissa Solja; Sabine Winter	Austria; Li Qiangbing; Liu Jia; Sofia Polcanova; Amelie Solja	Sweden; Linda Bergström; Matilda Ekholm; Li Fen; Daniela Moskovits
Women's team	Germany; Han Ying; Irene Ivancan; Shan Xiaona; Petrissa Solja; Sabine Winter	Austria; Li Qiangbing; Liu Jia; Sofia Polcanova; Amelie Solja	Poland; Katarzyna Grzybowska; Li Qian; Natalia Partyka; Kinga Stefanska

== Results ==
=== Men ===
==== Preliminary round ====
===== Group A =====
Team	Pld	W	L	GW	GL	Pts
Germany	3	3	0	9	2	6
Portugal	3	1	2	5	6	2
Austria	3	1	2	6	7	2
Hungary	3	1	2	3	8	2

===== Group B =====
Team	Pld	W	L	GW	GL	Pts
Spain	3	2	1	7	5	4
France	3	2	1	7	4	4
Greece	3	2	1	6	5	4
Slovakia	3	0	3	3	9	0

===== Group C =====
Team	Pld	W	L	GW	GL	Pts
Belarus	3	3	0	9	4	6
Sweden	3	2	1	7	3	4
Italy	3	1	2	4	8	2
Poland	3	0	3	4	9	0

===== Group D =====
Team	Pld	W	L	GW	GL	Pts
Russia	3	3	0	9	4	6
Croatia	3	2	1	8	4	4
Romania	3	1	2	6	8	2
Czech Republic	3	0	3	2	9	0

==== Championship bracket ====
Quarterfinals			Semifinals			Final
A1	Germany	3
B2	France	0	A1	Germany	3
D2	Croatia	3	D2	Croatia	1
C1	Belarus	2				A1	Germany	1
D1	Russia	1				A2	Portugal	3
A2	Portugal	3	A2	Portugal	3
C2	Sweden	3	C2	Sweden	1
B1	Spain	1

=== Women ===
==== Preliminary round ====
===== Group A =====
Team	Pld	W	L	GW	GL	Pts
Germany	3	3	0	9	1	6
Austria	3	2	1	6	3	4
France	3	1	2	3	6	2
Turkey	3	0	3	1	9	0

===== Group B =====
Team	Pld	W	L	GW	GL	Pts
Poland	3	3	0	9	2	6
Romania	3	2	1	6	4	4
Portugal	3	1	2	6	7	2
Spain	3	0	3	1	9	0

===== Group C =====
Team	Pld	W	L	GW	GL	Pts
Hungary	3	2	1	7	5	4
Netherlands	3	2	1	7	4	4
Russia	3	2	1	7	6	4
Luxembourg	3	0	3	3	9	0

===== Group D =====
Team	Pld	W	L	GW	GL	Pts
Sweden	3	2	1	8	6	4
Belarus	3	2	1	7	5	4
Czech Republic	3	2	1	7	7	4
Ukraine	3	0	3	0	0	0

==== Championship bracket ====
Quarterfinals			Semifinals			Final
A1	Germany	3
C2	Netherlands	0	A1	Germany	3
B2	Romania	2	B2	Sweden	0
D1	Sweden	3				A1	Germany	3
C1	Hungary	1				A2	Austria	0
A2	Austria	3	A2	Austria	3
D2	Belarus	0	B1	Poland	1
B1	Poland	3
