= Bora Vang =

Turkish table tennis player

Personal information
- Nationality: Turkey
- Born: April 9, 1987 (age 39) Shijiazhuang, China
- Height: 1.77 m (5 ft 10 in)
- Weight: 82 kg (181 lb)

Sport
- Sport: Table tennis
- Club: Adana Table Tennis Club
- Playing style: All round player
Medal record
Men's table tennis
Representing Turkey
European Championships
| Gold medal – first place | 2010 Subotica | Mixed Doubles |
| Silver medal – second place | 2012 Buzau | Mixed Doubles |
Mediterranean Games
| Gold medal – first place | 2013 Mersin | Team |
| Silver medal – second place | 2013 Mersin | Singles |

Bora Vang (王博, born April 9, 1987) is a Chinese-born Turkish male national table tennis player. The 1.77 m (5 ft 10 in) tall athlete at 82 kg (181 lb) competes for Adana Table Tennis Club, where he is coached by Sabahattin Sabrioğlu.

He won the gold medal in the mixed doubles event at the 2010 European Mixed Double Championships held in Subotica, Serbia together with his Turkish teammate Şirin He. In 2012, he and his Turkish teammate Melek Hu won the silver medal at the European Mixed Double Championships held in Buzau, Romania.

Vang qualified for the 2012 Summer Olympics after the World Qualification Championship held in Doha, Qatar.

At the 2013 Mediterranean Games held in Mersin, Turkey, he won the silver medal in the singles event.

== Achievements ==
| Year | Competition | Venue | Position | Event | Notes |
|---|---|---|---|---|---|
| 2010 | European Mixed Double Championships | Subotica, Serbia | 1st | Mixed Doubles | with Şirin He TUR |
| 2012 | European Mixed Double Championships | Buzau, Romania | 2nd | Mixed Doubles | with Melek Hu TUR |
| 2013 | XVII Mediterranean Games | Mersin, Turkey | 2nd | Singles | |
| 2013 | XVII Mediterranean Games | Mersin, Turkey | 1st | Team | with Ahmet Li TUR |
