= Li Fen =

Swedish table tennis player (born 1976)

Personal information
- Nationality: Sweden
- Born: 25 August 1976 (age 49) Shandong, China

Sport
- Sport: Table tennis
- Highest ranking: 17 (May 2014)
Medal record
Women's table tennis
Representing Sweden
European Championships
Gold medal – first place	2013 Schwechat	Singles
Bronze medal – third place	2014 Lisbon	Team

Li Fen (Chinese: 李芬; born 25 August 1976) is a Chinese-born Swedish table tennis player. At the 2013 Table Tennis European Championships she made her first appearance in an international championship and won gold in the women's singles event.
