= Cycling at the 2013 Mediterranean Games =

The cycling competitions at the 2013 Mediterranean Games in Mersin took place between 21 June and 23 June at the Adnan Menderes Boulevard. Women's road race was planned, but got cancelled because too few nations applied.

Athletes competed in two events.

== Medal summary ==
=== Road cycling ===
Event	Gold	Silver	Bronze
Men's road race	Nicola Ruffoni; Italy	Christophe Laporte; France	Abdelbasset Hannachi; Algeria
Men's time trial	Yoann Paillot; France	Lluís Mas Bonet; Spain	Rasim Reis; Turkey

=== Medal table ===
Key:

* Host nation (Turkey)

Rank	Nation	Gold	Silver	Bronze	Total
1	France	1	1	0	2
2	Italy	1	0	0	1
3	Spain	0	1	0	1
4	Algeria	0	0	1	1
4	Turkey*	0	0	1	1
Totals (5 entries)		2	2	2	6
