= Metin Sevinç =

Turkish footballer

Personal information
- Date of birth: 14 June 1994 (age 32)
- Place of birth: Fatih, Turkey
- Height: 1.78 m (5 ft 10 in)
- Position: Attacking midfielder

Team information
- Current team: Çankaya
- Number: 11

Youth career
- 2006–2009: İstanbulspor
- 2009–2012: Beşiktaş
- 2012–2013: Kasımpaşa

Senior career*
Years	Team	Apps	(Gls)
2013–2015	Kasımpaşa	1	(0)
2014	→ Bugsaşspor (loan)	4	(1)
2015–2016	Fatih Karagümrük	25	(1)
2016–2017	Bayrampaşaspor	32	(5)
2017–2020	Fethiyespor	50	(4)
2020–2021	Düzcespor	35	(8)
2021–2023	Orduspor 1967	58	(18)
2023–	Çankaya	4	(0)

International career
2013	Turkey U19	5	(1)
- * Club domestic league appearances and goals as of 1 October 2023

Metin Sevinç (born 14 June 1994) is a Turkish footballer who plays as an attacking midfielder for TFF Third League club Çankaya. He made his Süper Lig debut on 2 November 2013.

== International career ==
Sevinç represented Turkish national under-19 team at the 2013 Mediterranean Games.
