= Shen Yanfei =

Spanish table tennis player

Personal information
- Nationality: Spain
- Born: 24 December 1979 (age 46) Hebei, China
- Height: 1.62 m (5 ft 4 in)
- Weight: 52 kg (115 lb; 8.2 st)

Sport
- Sport: Table tennis
- Playing style: Left-handed, shakehand grip
- Highest ranking: 6 (March 2013)
Medal record
Women's table tennis
Representing Spain
European Championships
Gold medal – first place	2015 Yekaterinburg	Doubles
Bronze medal – third place	2013 Schwechat	Doubles
Mediterranean Games
Gold medal – first place	2013 Mersin	Team
Bronze medal – third place	2013 Mersin	Singles

Shen Yanfei (simplified Chinese: 沈燕飞; traditional Chinese: 沈燕飛; pinyin: Shén Yànfēi; born December 24, 1979, in Hebei, China) is a female Chinese-born table tennis player who now represents Spain and resides in Cartagena, Murcia.

She competed at the 2008 Summer Olympics, reaching the third round of the singles competition. She also competed in the team competition. In May 2011 she qualified directly for the 2012 Summer Olympics.

== Career records ==
Singles (as of July 6, 2013)

- Olympics: round of 16 (2012).
- Women's World Cup: 3rd (2012).
- World Tour winner (3): Korea Open 2010; Japan Open, German Open 2012. Runner-up (2): Chinese Taipei Open 2006; Spanish Open 2013.
- World Tour Grand Finals appearances: 4. Record: SF (2006).
- Europe Top-12: 5th (2006, 2011)

Women's doubles

- World Tour winner (4): Chinese Taipei Open 2005; China (Guangzhou) Open 2006; Korea, Chinese Taipei Open 2007.
- World Tour Grand Finals appearances: 3. Record: winner (2005); runner-up (2006).

Team

- Olympics: 9th (2008, 2012).
- World Championships: 15th (2010).
