= Hafsa Şeyda Burucu =

Turkish karateka (born 1991)

- Born: December 24, 1991 (age 34); Serdivan, Turkey
- Nationality: Turkish
- Division: -68 kg
- Style: Karate
- Team: Sakarya Büyükşehir Belediyespor Club
- Rank: 7th (World -68 kg)

Other information
- University: Sakarya University

Hafsa Şeyda Burucu
Medal record

Women's Karate

World Championships
Silver medal – second place	2012 Paris	Kumite −68 kg
Bronze medal – third place	2010 Belgrade	Kumite −68 kg

European Championships
Bronze medal – third place	2017 İzmit	Kumite −68 kg
Gold medal – first place	2013 Budapest	Kumite −68 kg
Gold medal – first place	2012 Adeje, Tenerife	Kumite −68 kg
Silver medal – second place	2010 Athens	Kumite −68 kg

Mediterranean Games
Gold medal – first place	2013 Mersin	Kumite -68 kg

World Junior & Cadet Championships
Silver medal – second place	2009 Rabat	J Kumite +59kg

U-21 European Cup
Bronze medal – third place	2012 Baku	J Kumite +60kg
Gold medal – first place	2010 İzmir	J Kumite +60kg

Hafsa Şeyda Burucu (born December 24, 1991) is a European champion Turkish karateka competing currently in the kumite -68 kg division. She is a member of Sakarya Büyükşehir Belediyespor Club.

Şeyda Burucu became European champion at the 2012 European Karate Championships held in Adeje, Tenerife, Spain. In 2013, she defended her European champion title in Budapest, Hungary.

== Life ==
Burucu was born to Tercan Burucu and his wife Saniye. She has two sisters Sümeyye and Zehra Rumeysa. She is a student of physical education at Sakarya University.

== Achievements ==
Year	Competition	Venue	Position	Event	Notes
Representing Turkey
2009	World Junior & Cadet Karate Championships	Rabat, Morocco	2nd place, silver medalist(s)	Junior Kumite +59 kg	November 12
2010	Under 21 European Cup	İzmir, Turkey	1st place, gold medalist(s)	kumite +60 kg	February 7
2010	45th European Championships	Athens, Greece	2nd place, silver medalist(s)	kumite -68 kg	May 7
2010	World Championships	Belgrade, Serbia	3rd place, bronze medalist(s)	kumite -68 kg	October 27–31
2011	Under 21 European Cup	Novi Sad, Serbia	7th	Junior kumite +60 kg	February 11–13
2012	Karate Premier League	Paris, France	5th	kumite -68 kg	January 14
2012	Under 21 European Cup -	Baku, Azerbaijan	3rd place, bronze medalist(s)	kumite +60 kg	February 10
2012	47th European Championships	Adeje, Spain	1st place, gold medalist(s)	kumite -68 kg	May 10
2012	8th World University Karate Championships	Bratislava, Slovakia	3rd place, bronze medalist(s)	kumite +68 kg	July 13
2012	Karate Premier League	Istanbul, Turkey	3rd place, bronze medalist(s)	kumite -68 kg	September 1
2012	World Championships	Paris, France	2nd place, silver medalist(s)	kumite -68 kg	November 21–25
2013	48th European Championships	Budapest, Hungary	1st place, gold medalist(s)	kumite -68 kg	May 5–9
2013	XVII Mediterranean Games	Mersin, Turkey	1st place, gold medalist(s)	kumite -68 kg	June 29
