= Alexander Shibaev (table tennis) =

Russian table tennis player

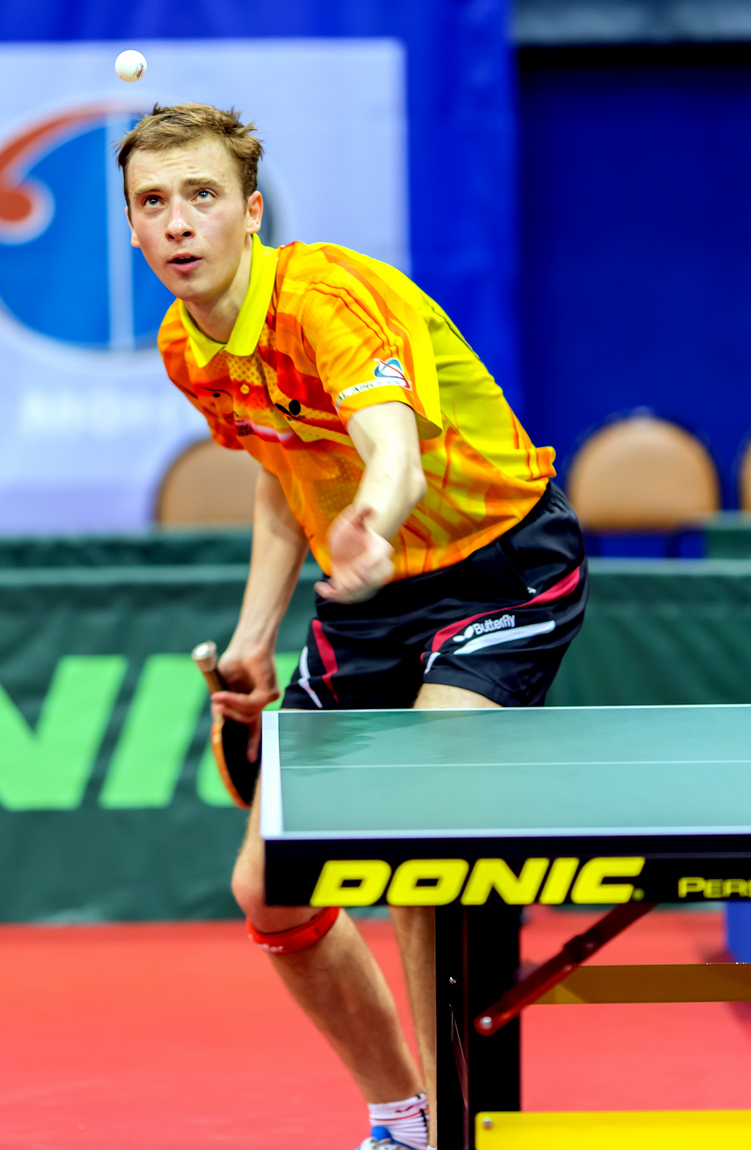

Personal information
- Nationality: Russian
- Born: 9 September 1990 (age 35) Yaroslavl, Yaroslavl AO, Russian SFSR, Soviet Union
- Height: 1.92 m (6 ft 3 1/2 in)
- Weight: 77 kg (170 lb; 12.1 st)

Sport
- Sport: Table tennis
- Club: UMMC (Russia)
- Playing style: Right-handed, shakehand grip, blade Stiga Clipper Wood and rubbers Tenergy 05.
- Highest ranking: 21 (June 2016)
Medal record
Men's table tennis
Representing Russia
European Championships
Silver medal – second place	2011 Gdansk-Sopot	Doubles
Bronze medal – third place	2013 Schwechat	Team
Bronze medal – third place	2015 Yekaterinburg	Doubles
Europe Top-16
Silver medal – second place	2017 Antibes	Singles
Bronze medal – third place	2016 Gondomar	Singles

Alexander Igorevich Shibaev (Russian: Александр Игоревич Шибаев; born 9 September 1990 in Yaroslavl) is a Russian table tennis player. He won the doubles crown with Alexey Smirnov at the 2010 Slovenian Open. In 2011, he won a silver medal with Kirill Skachkov in the double event at the European Championships.

His first appearance in a singles final on the ITTF World Tour was at the 2011 Polish Open. In 2012, he made it to the semifinals at the Japan Open by defeating Seiya Kishikawa, Koki Niwa and Joo Se-Hyuk consecutively.

He also competed at the 2012 and 2016 Summer Olympics.

Shibaev and the French table tennis player Simon Gauzy also are known for having a feud, reaching the point of having an argument and a harsher physical contact after playing the 2017 ITTF-Europe Top 16 semifinals.
