= He Zhiwen =

Spanish table tennis player

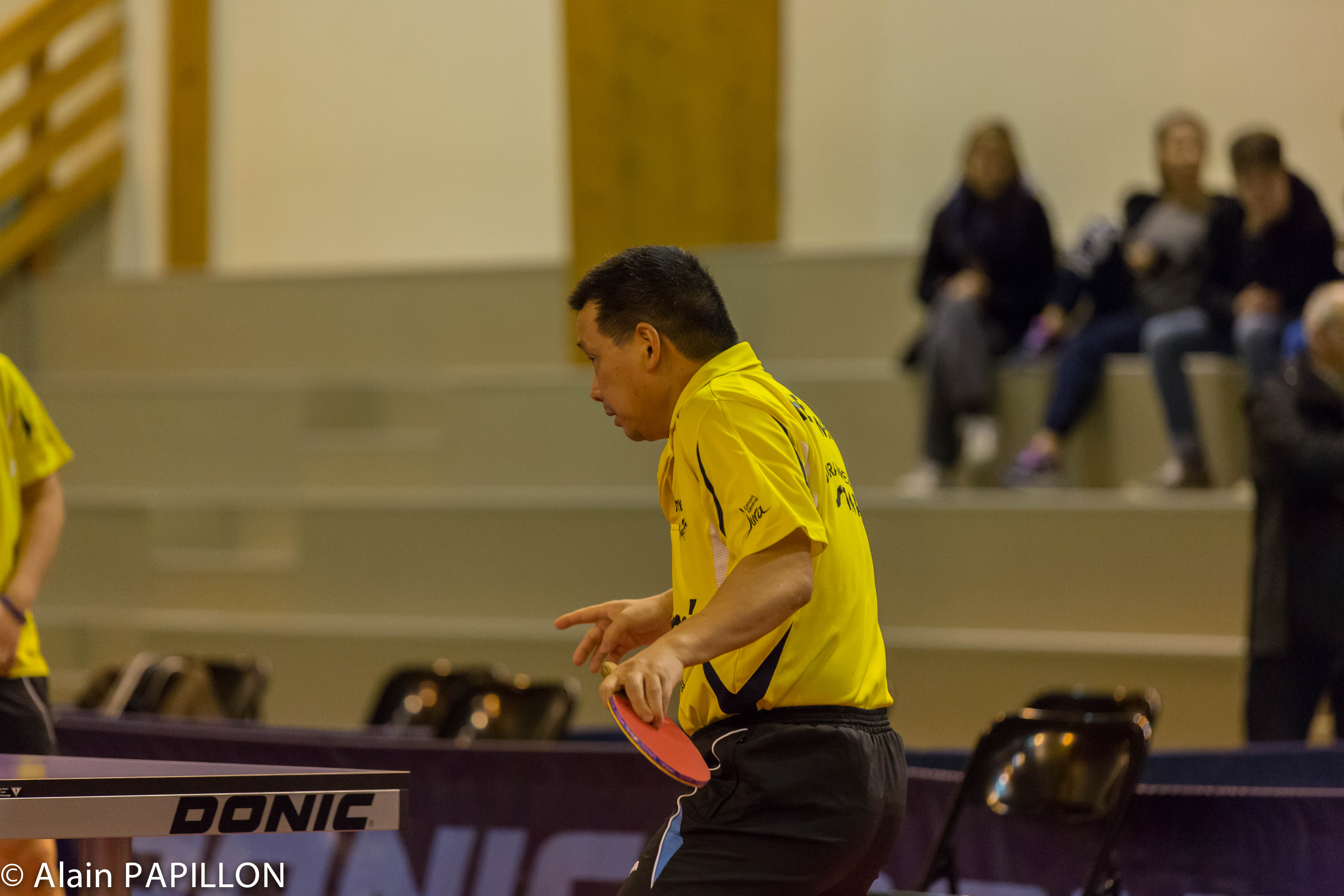
- He in 2014

Personal information
- Nickname: Juanito
- Nationality: China Spain
- Born: 31 January 1962 (age 64) Zhejiang, China
- Height: 1.73 m (5 ft 8 in)
- Weight: 75 kg (165 lb; 11.8 st)

Sport
- Sport: Table tennis
- Playing style: Chinese penhold, traditional backhand
Medal record
Table tennis
Representing China
World Championships
Bronze medal – third place	1985 Göteborg	Doubles
Representing Spain
European Championships
Bronze medal – third place	2013 Schwechat	Doubles
Mediterranean Games
Bronze medal – third place	2013 Mersin	Team

He Zhiwen (Chinese: 何志文; pinyin: Hé Zhìwén; born January 31, 1962), or Zhiwen He in Western name order, is a Chinese-born Spanish male table tennis player. In 2006 he was ranked #41 in the ITTF world ranking. Due to the difficulty of pronouncing his name in Spanish he has been given the nickname Juanito.

He plays for Jura Morez TT club and his playing style is left handed short pips penholder. He represented Spain in the 2012 London Olympics where he lost to Romanian Adrian Crisan.

== Sporting achievements ==
- 1985: First position in the Championship of the World by team.
- 1991-2005: Champion of Spanish League.
- 1998: Twentieth position in the Championship of Europe by team.
- 1999: First position in mixed doubles and by team.
- 2000: Fifth position in the Championship of Europe in mixed doubles.

Ninth position the Championship of individual Europe in and double.
21st position in the Championship of the World by team.

- 2003: Seventeenth position in the World singles Championship.
- 2004: Thirtieth third position in the Olympic Games of Athens in singles.
- 2004: It occupies the sixtieth second position of the worldwide ranking.
- 2005: Ninth position in the Championship of Europe in doubles.

Fourteenth position in the .
Sixty-sixth position in the Championship of Europe in mixed doubles.
Ninth position in the Championship of the World in singles.
