= Emre Bayav =

Turkish basketball player (born 1987)

Free agen
- Position: Center

Personal information
- Born: July 14, 1987 (age 39) Istanbul, Turkey
- Listed height: 6 ft 11.5 in (2.12 m)

Career information
- NBA draft: 2009: undrafted
- Playing career: 2006–present

Career history
- 2006–2007: Efes Pilsen
- 2007–2008: Pınar Karşıyaka
- 2008–2009: Darüşşafaka Cooper Tires
- 2009–2010: Aliağa Petkim
- 2010–2012: Pınar Karşıyaka
- 2012–2013: Erdemirspor
- 2013–2014: Royal Halı Gaziantep
- 2014–2015: Darüşşafaka & Doğuş
- 2015–2016: Beşiktaş
Medals
Men's basketball
Representing Turkey
Mediterranean Games
Gold medal – first place	2013 Mersin	Team
FIBA Europe Under-18 Championship
Silver medal – second place	2005 Serbia & Montenegro	U-18 Team
Silver medal – second place	2004 Spain	U-18 Team

Emre Bayav (born July 14, 1987) is a Turkish professional basketball player who last played for Beşiktaş of the Turkish Basketball Super League (BSL).

== Professional career ==
Bayav began his basketball career at Istanbul Technical University team. After playing for junior team of Crvena zvezda in Serbia, he returned to Turkey and transferred to Efes Pilsen. He was then on loan at Pertevniyal, Pınar Karşıyaka, Darüşşafaka Cooper Tires as well as Aliağa Petkim. He transferred in the 2012–13 season to Erdemirspor from Pınar Karşıyaka, where he played from 2010 to 2012. In July 2015, he signed with Beşiktaş.
