= João Monteiro (table tennis) =

Portuguese table tennis player

Personal information
- Full name: João Pedro Andrade Selgas Monteiro
- Born: 29 August 1983 (age 43) Guarda, Portugal
- Height: 1.80 m (5 ft 11 in)
- Weight: 70 kg (154 lb)

Sport
- Sport: Table tennis
- Highest ranking: 29 (March 2015)
- Current ranking: 147 (2 November 2026)
Medal record
Men's table tennis
Representing Portugal
World Championships
Bronze medal – third place	2019 Budapest	Doubles
European Games
Bronze medal – third place	2019 Minsk	Team
European Championships
Gold medal – first place	2014 Lisbon	Team
Gold medal – first place	2015 Ekaterinburg	Doubles
Gold medal – first place	2016 Budapest	Mixed doubles
Silver medal – second place	2017 Luxembourg	Team
Silver medal – second place	2019 Nantes	Team
Bronze medal – third place	2011 Gdansk-Sopot	Team
Bronze medal – third place	2013 Schwechat	Doubles
Bronze medal – third place	2020 Warsaw	Doubles
Bronze medal – third place	2023 Malmö	Team
Mediterranean Games
Silver medal – second place	2022 Oran	Team

João Pedro Andrade Selgas Monteiro (born 29 August 1983) is a Portuguese table tennis player. At the 2015 European Championships, he won the gold medal in the Doubles competition. He also competed at the 2012 Summer Olympics in the Men's singles, but was defeated in the second round. This was a round further than he managed at the 2008 Summer Olympics.

João Monteiro practices at the Werner Schlager Academy in Schwechat, Austria since the opening in 2011.

== Major League Table Tennis ==
In 2025, Monteiro joined Texas Smash for the third season of Major League Table Tennis (MLTT). He was selected in the 2025 MLTT Draft as part of a high-profile international player pool that included other top-tier veterans like Yuya Oshima and Koki Niwa.

Playing in the Western Division, Monteiro took on a leadership role for the Smash, serving as the lead-off singles player in several matches. During the 2025–26 season, he was noted for his consistency, notably avoiding a single-match sweep during the first ten weeks of play. He also formed a doubles partnership with American Olympian Nandan Naresh, helping the Texas Smash secure a top-two position in the Western Division standings during the 2026 regular season.

== Personal life ==
In July 2013, Monteiro married Romanian table tennis player Daniela Dodean.
