= Melek Hu =

Turkish table tennis player

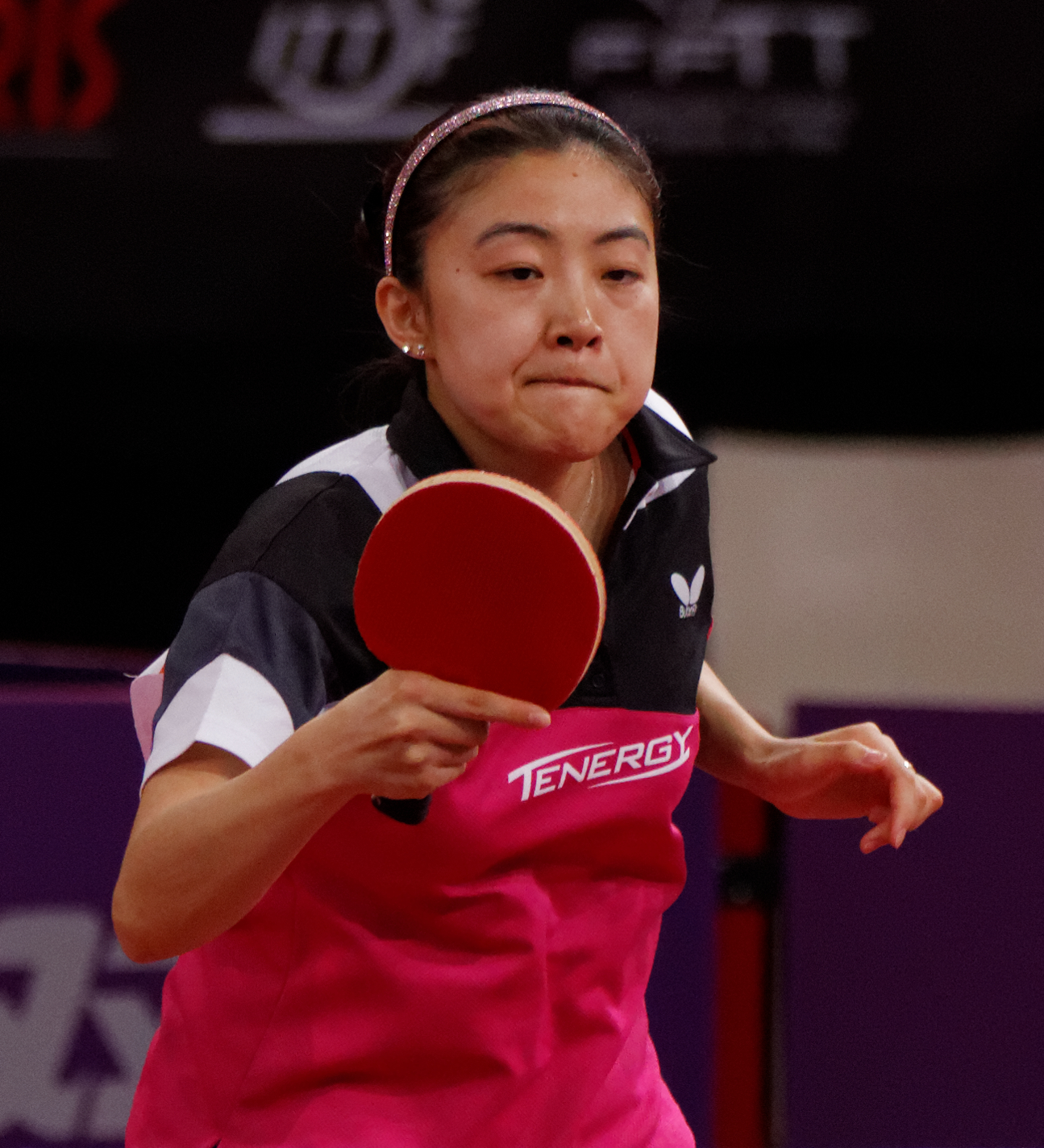
- 2013 World Table Tennis Championships

Personal information
- Nationality: Turkey
- Born: 27 January 1989 (age 37) China
- Height: 1.65 m (5 ft 5 in)
- Weight: 50 kg (110 lb)

Sport
- Sport: Table tennis
- Club: Fenerbahçe Table Tennis
- Playing style: All round player
- Highest ranking: 13 (December 2016)
- Current ranking: 13 (December 2016)
Medal record
Women's table tennis
Representing Turkey
European Championships
Gold medal – first place	2016 Budapest	Singles
Gold medal – first place	2015 Yekaterinburg	Doubles
Gold medal – first place	2010 Subotica	Mixed doubles
Silver medal – second place	2012 Buzau	Mixed doubles
Bronze medal – third place	2010 Ostrava	Singles
Bronze medal – third place	2011 Istanbul	Mixed doubles
European Games
Bronze medal – third place	2015 Baku	Singles
Mediterranean Games
Gold medal – first place	2009 Pescara	Singles
Gold medal – first place	2013 Mersin	Singles
Islamic Solidarity Games
Gold medal – first place	2017 Baku	Singles
Bronze medal – third place	2017 Baku	Team

Melek Hu, born Hou Meiling (Chinese: 侯美玲) 27 January 1989, Shenyang) is a Chinese-born Turkish table tennis player. She has played for Fenerbahçe TT since 2007 and also played for An Gang in China. She has won European championships in the mixed (2010), double (2015) and single (2016) events.

== Major achievements ==
- Played for Turkey 2008 Olympic Team in 2008 Olympic Games in China
- 1 time Turkish Super League Champion
- 1 time Turkish Champion
- 2009 Mediterranean Games Champion
- 1 time Balkan Games Champion
- 1 time ETTU Cup runner-up
- Bronze medal at the European Table Tennis Championships 2010
- Silver medal at the 2012 European Mixed Double Championships held in Buzau, Romania
- Qualified for the 2012 Summer Olympics
- Bronze medal at the 2015 European Games in women's singles in table tennis.
- Competed for Turkey at the 2016 Olympics
- European mixed champion in 2010
- European doubles champion in 2015
- European singles champion in 2016

== See also ==
- Turkish women in sports
