= Ahmet Li =

Turkish table tennis player

Personal information
- Nationality: Turkey
- Born: January 12, 1991 (age 35) China
- Height: 185 cm (6 ft 1 in)
- Weight: 80 kg (176 lb)

Sport
- Sport: Table tennis
- Club: Beşiktaş J.K.
- Playing style: All round player
- Highest ranking: 40 (April 2016)
- Current ranking: 44 (August 2016)
Medal record
table tennis
Representing Turkey
Mediterranean Games
Bronze medal – third place	2013 Mersin	Single
Gold medal – first place	2013 Mersin	Team
Islamic Solidarity Games
Silver medal – second place	2017 Baku	Team

Ahmet Li (Chinese: 李良夫; pinyin: Lǐ Liángfū, born January 12, 1991) is a Chinese-born Turkish table tennis player. He is a member of Beşiktaş J.K. In April 2016, Li climbed up 26 steps to the 40th place in the world ranking list. As of August 2016, he is ranked the forty-fourth player in the world.

In 2012, he took the bronze medal in the under-21 category of the ITTF World Tour Spanish Open in Almeria.

Li won the bronze medal in singles event, and the gold medal in the team event at the 2013 Mediterranean Games in Mersin, Turkey.

He took part at the 2015 European Games in Baku, Azerbaijan. He was eliminated by losing in the first round.

Li earned a quota spot for the 2016 Summer Olympics with his performance at the 2016 ITTF European Olympic Qualification Tournament in Halmstad, Sweden.
