= Artistic gymnastics at the 2013 Mediterranean Games – Women's balance beam =

The women's balance beam competitions at the 2013 Mediterranean Games in Mersin was held at the Mersin Gymnastics Hall on 24 June 2013.

== Format competition ==
The top eight qualifiers in the qualification phase (limit two per NOC), advanced to the apparatus final. Qualification scores were then ignored, with only final round scores counting.

== Schedule ==
All times are Eastern European Summer Time (UTC+3)

Date	Time	Round
Sunday, 24 June 2012	14:00	Finals

== Qualification ==
Rank	Gymnast	Nation	D Score	E Score	Pen.	Total	Qual.
1	Giorgia Campana	Italy	5.900	8.366		14.266	Q
2	Vanessa Ferrari	Italy	5.600	8.466		14.066	Q
3	Vasiliki Millousi	Greece	5.700	8.233	0.1	13.833	Q
4	Valentine Sabatou	France	5.300	8.300		13.600	Q
5	Chiara Gandolfi	Italy	5.000	8.400		13.400	-
6	Elisabetta Preziosa	Italy	5.900	7.466		13.366	-
7	Ozlem Ozkan	Turkey	5.000	8.133		13.133	Q
8	Maelys Plessis	France	5.500	7.633		13.133	Q
9	Monon Cormoreche	France	5.000	7.333		12.333	-
10	Nancy Taman	Egypt	5.100	7.266	0.1	12.266	Q
11	Maria Paula Vargas	Spain	5.600	6.700	0.1	12.200	Q
12	Mira Boumejmajen	France	4.900	7.166		12.066	-
13	Teja Belac	Slovenia	4.600	7.233		11.833	R
14	Roxana Popa	Spain	5.500	6.266		11.766	R
15	Sema Fidel Aslan	Turkey	4.700	6.866		11.566	R

* Chiara Gandolfi (ITA) ranked 5th, Elisabetta Preziosa (ITA) ranked 6th, and Monon Cormoreche (FRA) ranked 9th but did not qualify to finals because of the 2-per-country rule.

* Mira Boumejmajen (FRA) ranked 12th respectively but did not qualify as Reserves for this final due to teammates ranked above her.

== Final ==
Rank	Gymnast	Nation	D Score	E Score	Pen.	Total
1st place, gold medalist(s)	Giorgia Campana	Italy	6.100	8.433		14.533
2nd place, silver medalist(s)	Vasiliki Millousi	Greece	6.000	8.200		14.200
3rd place, bronze medalist(s)	Vanessa Ferrari	Italy	5.800	8.366		14.166
4	Valentine Sabatou	France	5.500	8.566		14.066
5	Maelys Plessis	France	5.300	7.833		13.133
6	Maria Paula Vargas	Spain	5.300	6.766		12.066
7	Ozlem Ozkan	Turkey	5.000	7.000		12.000
8	Nancy Taman	Egypt	5.100	6.033		11.133
