= Artistic gymnastics at the 2013 Mediterranean Games =

- Venue: Mersin Gymnastics Hall
- Dates: 21–24 June

Artistic gymnastics at the 2013 Mediterranean Games
Qualification	men	women
Team all-around	men	women
Individual all-around	men	women
Vault	men	women
Floor	men	women
Pommel horse	men
Rings	men
Parallel bars	men
Horizontal bar	men
Uneven bars		women
Balance beam		women

The artistic gymnastics competitions at the 2013 Mediterranean Games in Mersin took place between 21 June and 24 June at the Mersin Gymnastics Hall.

Athletes competed in 14 events.

== Participating nations ==
Seventeen nations have registered for artistic gymnastics competitions; sixteen in men's competitions and eleven in women's competitions.

- Albania
- Algeria
- Croatia
- Cyprus
- Egypt
- France
- Greece
- Italy
- Lebanon
- Libya
- (North Macedonia) Macedonia
- Monaco
- Slovenia
- Spain
- Syria
- Tunisia
- Turkey

== Schedule ==
Q	Qualification	F	Final

Event↓/Date →	Fri 21	Sat 22	Sun 23	Mon 24
Men's individual all-around		Q	F	
Men's team all-around		F		
Men's vault		Q		F
Men's floor		Q		F
Men's pommel horse		Q		F
Men's rings		Q		F
Men's parallel bars		Q		F
Men's horizontal bar		Q		F
Women's individual all-around	Q		F	
Women's team all-around	F			
Women's vault	Q			F
Women's floor	Q			F
Women's uneven bars	Q			F
Women's balance beam	Q			F

== Medal summary ==
=== Men's events ===
Event	Gold	Silver	Bronze
Team all-around	Spain; Néstor Abad; Christian Bazan; Javier Gómez Fuertes; Fabian Gonzalez; Ruben Martinez	Italy; Andrea Cingolani; Ludovico Edalli; Paolo Ottavi; Enrico Pozzo; Paolo Principi	France; Kevin Antoniotti; Guillaume Augugliaro; Quentin Signori; Arnaud Willig; Jim Zona
Individual all-around	Javier Gómez Fuertes; Spain	Fabian Gonzalez; Spain	Guillaume Augugliaro; France
Floor	Eleftherios Kosmidis; Greece	Fabian Gonzalez; Spain	Wajdi Bouallègue; Tunisia
Pommel horse	Sašo Bertoncelj; Slovenia	Robert Seligman; Croatia	Fabian Gonzalez; Spain
Rings	Eleftherios Petrounias; Greece	İbrahim Çolak; Turkey	Javier Gómez Fuertes; Spain
Vault	Néstor Abad; Spain	Paolo Principi; Italy	Wajdi Bouallègue; Tunisia
Parallel bars	Kevin Antoniotti; France	Ruben Martinez; Spain	Ferhat Arıcan; Turkey
Horizontal bar	Ümit Şamiloğlu; Turkey	Marijo Možnik; Croatia	Enrico Pozzo; Italy

=== Women's events ===
Event	Gold	Silver	Bronze
Team all-around	Italy; Giorgia Campana; Vanessa Ferrari; Chiara Gandolfi; Giulia Leni; Elisabetta Preziosa	France; Mira Boumejmajen; Johanna Cano; Monon Cormoreche; Maelys Plessis; Valentine Sabatou	Greece; Myropi Christofilaki; Vasiliki Millousi; Maria Simou; Maria Trichopoulou
Individual all-around	Vanessa Ferrari; Italy	Maria Paula Vargas; Spain	Valentine Sabatou; France
Vault	Fadwa Mahmoud; Egypt	Johanna Cano; France	Giulia Leni; Italy
Uneven bars	Chiara Gandolfi; Italy	Maria Paula Vargas; Spain	Giorgia Campana; Italy
Balance beam	Giorgia Campana; Italy	Vasiliki Millousi; Greece	Vanessa Ferrari; Italy
Floor	Vanessa Ferrari; Italy	Valentine Sabatou; France	Elisabetta Preziosa; Italy

== Medal table ==
Rank	Nation	Gold	Silver	Bronze	Total
1	Italy (ITA)	5	2	5	12
2	Spain (ESP)	3	5	2	10
3	Greece (GRE)	2	1	1	4
4	France (FRA)	1	3	3	7
5	Turkey (TUR)	1	1	1	3
6	Egypt (EGY)	1	0	0	1
6	Slovenia (SLO)	1	0	0	1
8	Croatia (CRO)	0	2	0	2
9	Tunisia (TUN)	0	0	2	2
Totals (9 entries)		14	14	14	42
