= Artistic gymnastics at the 2013 Mediterranean Games – Women's individual all-around =

The women's artistic gymnastics individual all-around competitions at the 2013 Mediterranean Games in Mersin was held at the Mersin Gymnastics Hall on 23 June 2013.

== Format competition ==
The qualifiers in the qualification phase (limit two per NOC), based on combined score of each apparatus, advanced to the individual all-around final. The finalists performed on each apparatus again. Qualification scores were then ignored, with only final round scores counting.

== Schedule ==
All times are Eastern European Summer Time (UTC+3)

Date	Time	Round
Sunday, 23 June 2012	12:15	Finals

== Qualifications ==
Position	Gymnast	Vault (gymnastics)	Uneven bars	Balance beam	Floor (gymnastics)	Total
1st	Vanessa Ferrari (ITA)	13.900	12.666	14.066	14.000	54.632
2nd	Giorgia Campana (ITA)	14.133	13.766	14.266	12.333	54.498
3rd	Valentine Sabatou (FRA)	13.633	13.133	13.600	13.433	53.799
6th	Maria Paula Vargas (ESP)	13.933	13.866	12.200	13.066	53.065
7th	Maelys Plessis (FRA)	13.466	13.366	13.133	13.066	53.031
9th	Nancy Taman (EGY)	14.033	10.900	12.266	12.500	49.699
10th	Farida Shokry (EGY)	13.266	10.733	11.100	12.833	47.932
11th	Demet Mutlu (TUR)	13.700	10.300	10.800	12.566	47.366
12th	Sema Fidel Aslan (TUR)	13.300	10.666	11.566	11.166	46.698
14th	Carmen Astrid Horvat (SLO)	13.466	11.533	10.533	10.933	46.465
15th	Maria Trichopoulou (GRE)	12.466	11.300	10.300	11.500	45.566
16th	Maria Simou (GRE)	12.833	8.866	11.466	12.233	45.398
19th	Rafaella Zannettou (CYP)	13.300	8.833	9.833	11.700	43.666
20th	Tina Ribic (SLO)	11.966	9.200	9.900	11.100	42.166

== Final ==
Position	Gymnast	Vault (gymnastics)	Uneven bars	Balance beam	Floor (gymnastics)	Total
1st place, gold medalist(s)	Vanessa Ferrari (ITA)	13.866	13.700	14.266	14.366	56.198
2nd place, silver medalist(s)	Maria Paula Vargas (ESP)	14.233	13.600	13.633	13.566	55.032
3rd place, bronze medalist(s)	Valentine Sabatou (FRA)	13.833	13.366	13.666	13.500	54.365
4	Giorgia Campana (ITA)	13.766	13.733	14.066	12.700	54.265
5	Maelys Plessis (FRA)	13.600	11.633	13.400	13.133	51.766
6	Nancy Taman (EGY)	13.566	11.200	12.766	11.266	48.798
7	Demet Mutlu (TUR)	13.100	11.366	11.800	12.466	48.732
8	Farida Shokry (EGY)	12.366	10.133	12.400	12.466	47.365
9	Maria Simou (GRE)	12.200	11.366	10.900	11.566	46.032
10	Carmen Astrid Horvat (SLO)	11.300	11.100	12.000	10.700	45.100
11	Sema Fidel Aslan (TUR)	12.633	10.033	11.133	11.266	45.065
12	Tina Ribic (SLO)	13.066	9.100	11.300	10.966	44.432
13	Maria Trichopoulou (GRE)	12.500	9.400	10.066	11.200	43.166
14	Rafaella Zannettou (CYP)	12.433	9.233	10.400	11.066	43.132
