= Judo at the 2013 Mediterranean Games – Women's 57 kg =

Judo Women's 57 kg at the 2013 Mediterranean Games
- Venue: Mersin Gymnastics Hall
- Location: Yenişehir, Mersin, Turkey
- Date: 21 June

Competition at external databases
- Links: JudoInside

The women's 57 kg competition of the judo events at the 2013 Mediterranean Games in Mersin, Turkey, was held on 21 June at the Mezitli Sports Hall.

== Schedule ==
All times are Eastern European Summer Time (UTC+3).

Date	Time	Round
June 21, 2013	12:00	Preliminaries
June 21, 2013	17:00	Finals

== Results ==
Legend

- 1st number = Ippon
- 2nd number = Waza-ari
- 3rd number = Yuko

=== Bracket ===
Quarter Finals
Shirley Elliot (FRA)	011
Fatima Zahra Ait Ali (MAR)	101
Martina Lo Giudice (ITA)	100
Arta Merturi (ALB)	000
Tuğba Zehir (TUR)	001
Ratiba Tariket (ALG)	000
Vlora Bedeti (SLO)	010
Sofia Tsolani (GRE)	000

Semi Finals
Fatima Zahra Ait Ali (MAR)
Martina Lo Giudice (ITA)	012
Tuğba Zehir (TUR)	000
Vlora Bedeti (SLO)	100

Final
Martina Lo Giudice (ITA)	000
Vlora Bedeti (SLO)	100

=== Repechage round ===
Two bronze medals were awarded.

Semifinals
Shirley Elliot (FRA)	120
Arta Merturi (ALB)	000
Sofia Tsolani (GRE)	101
Ratiba Tariket (ALG)	001

Finals
Tuğba Zehir (TUR)	000
Shirley Elliot (FRA)	120
Fatima Zahra Ait Ali (MAR)	100
Sofia Tsolani (GRE)	000
