= Artistic gymnastics at the 2013 Mediterranean Games – Women's vault =

The women's vault competitions at the 2013 Mediterranean Games in Mersin was held at the Mersin Gymnastics Hall on 24 June 2013.

== Format competition ==
The top eight qualifiers in the qualification phase (limit two per NOC), advanced to the apparatus final. Each gymnast performed two vaults. Qualification scores were then ignored, with only final round scores counting.

== Schedule ==
All times are Eastern European Summer Time (UTC+3)

Date	Time	Round
Sunday, 24 June 2012	11:30	Finals

== Qualifications ==
Position	Gymnast	Vault 1				Vault 2				Total
Position	Gymnast	D Score	E Score	Penalty	Vault Score	D Score	E Score	Penalty	Vault Score	Total
1	Fadwa Mahmoud (EGY)	7.000	7.600		14.600	5.200	8.833		14.033	14.316
2	Teja Belak (SLO)	5.300	8.566	0.1	13.766	5.300	9.066		14.366	14.066
3	Nancy Taman (EGY)	5.000	9.033		14.033	4.600	9.033		13.633	13.833
4	Johanna Cano (FRA)	5.000	8.800		13.800	4.600	8.700		13.300	13.550
5	Demet Mutlu (TUR)	5.000	8.700		13.700	4.600	8.733		13.333	13.516
6	Giulia Leni (ITA)	5.000	8.600		13.600	4.600	8.600		13.200	13.400
7	Rafaella Zannettou (CYP)	4.600	8.700		13.300	4.000	8.700		12.700	13.000
8	Tina Ribic (SLO)	4.400	7.666	0.1	11.966	4.200	8.500		12.700	12.333

== Finals ==
Position	Gymnast	Vault 1				Vault 2				Total
Position	Gymnast	D Score	E Score	Penalty	Vault Score	D Score	E Score	Penalty	Vault Score	Total
Gold medal	Fadwa Mahmoud (EGY)	7.000	7.500		14.500	5.200	8.800		14.000	14.250
Silver medal	Johanna Cano (FRA)	5.000	8.933		13.933	4.600	8.700		13.300	13.616
Bronze medal	Giulia Leni (ITA)	5.000	8.866		13.866	4.600	8.733		13.333	13.599
4	Demet Mutlu (TUR)	5.000	8.500		13.500	4.600	8.833		13.433	13.466
5	Nancy Taman (EGY)	5.000	8.400		13.400	4.600	8.700		13.300	13.350
6	Teja Belak (SLO)	5.300	7.633		12.933	5.300	8.333		13.633	13.283
7	Rafaella Zannettou (CYP)	4.600	8.566		13.166	4.000	8.633		12.633	12.899
8	Tina Ribic (SLO)	4.400	8.533		12.933	4.200	8.266		12.466	12.699
