= Judo at the 2013 Mediterranean Games – Men's 60 kg =

Judo Men's 60 kg at the 2013 Mediterranean Games
- Venue: Mersin Gymnastics Hall
- Location: Yenişehir, Mersin, Turkey
- Dates: 21 June

Competition at external databases
- Links: JudoInside

The men's 60 kg competition of the judo events at the 2013 Mediterranean Games in Mersin, Turkey, was held on 21 June at the Mezitli Sports Hall.

== Schedule ==
All times are Eastern European Summer Time (UTC+3).

Date	Time	Round
June 21, 2013	12:00	Preliminaries
June 21, 2013	17:00	Finals

== Results ==
Legend

- 1st number = Ippon
- 2nd number = Waza-ari
- 3rd number = Yuko

=== Bracket ===
Quarter Finals
Yassine Moudatir (MAR)	100
Indrit Cullhaj (ALB)	000
Ziade Damien (LIB)	000
Lyes Saker (ALG)	000
Mohamed Elhadi Elkawisah (LBA)	002
Matjaž Trbovc (SLO)	000
Fabio Basile (ITA)	001
Ahmet Sahin Kaba (TUR)	110

Semi Finals
Yassine Moudatir (MAR)	011
Lyes Saker (ALG)	000
Mohamed Elhadi Elkawisah (LBA)	000
Ahmet Sahin Kaba (TUR)	011

Final
Yassine Moudatir (MAR)	000
Ahmet Sahin Kaba (TUR)	000

=== Repechage round ===
Two bronze medals will be awarded.

Semifinals
Ziade Damien (LIB)	100
Indrit Cullhaj (ALB)	000
Matjaž Trbovc (SLO)	000
Fabio Basile (ITA)	110

Finals
Ziade Damien (LIB)	010
Mohamed Elhadi Elkawisah (LBA)	000
Lyes Saker (ALG)	000
Fabio Basile (ITA)	001
