= Judo at the 2013 Mediterranean Games – Women's 52 kg =

Judo Women's 52 kg at the 2013 Mediterranean Games
- Venue: Mersin Gymnastics Hall
- Location: Yenişehir, Mersin, Turkey
- Dates: 21 June

Competition at external databases
- Links: JudoInside

The women's 52 kg competition of the judo events at the 2013 Mediterranean Games in Mersin, Turkey, was held on 21 June at the Mezitli Sports Hall.

== Schedule ==
All times are Eastern European Summer Time (UTC+3).

Date	Time	Round
June 21, 2013	12:00	Preliminaries
June 21, 2013	17:00	Finals

== Results ==
Legend

- 1st number = Ippon
- 2nd number = Waza-ari
- 3rd number = Yuko

=== Bracket ===
Quarter Finals
Laura Gómez (ESP)	101
Delphine Delsalle (FRA)	000
Maria Karagiannopoulou (GRE)	000
Ayse Saadet Arca (TUR)	100
Selma Sejdinović (BIH)	000
Djazia Haddad (ALG)	001
Petra Nareks (SLO)	000
Elena Moretti (ITA)	000

Semi Finals
Laura Gómez (ESP)	110
Ayse Saadet Arca (TUR)	000
Djazia Haddad (ALG)	000
Petra Nareks (SLO)	100

Final
Laura Gómez (ESP)	010
Petra Nareks (SLO)	000

=== Repechage round ===
Two bronze medals will be awarded.

Semifinals
Maria Karagiannopoulou (GRE)	000
Delphine Delsalle (FRA)	000
Selma Sejdinović (BIH)	000
Elena Moretti (ITA)	1001

Finals
Delphine Delsalle (FRA)	000
Djazia Haddad (ALG)	000
Elena Moretti (ITA)	010
Ayse Saadet Arca (TUR)	120
