= Judo at the 2013 Mediterranean Games – Men's 66 kg =

Judo Men's 66 kg at the 2013 Mediterranean Games
- Venue: Mersin Gymnastics Hall
- Location: Yenişehir, Mersin, Turkey
- Dates: 21 June

Competition at external databases
- Links: JudoInside

The men's 66 kg competition of the judo events at the 2013 Mediterranean Games in Mersin, Turkey, was held on 21 June at the Mezitli Sports Hall.

== Schedule ==
All times are Eastern European Summer Time (UTC+3).

Date	Time	Round
June 21, 2013	12:00	Preliminaries
June 21, 2013	17:00	Finals

== Results ==
Legend

- 1st number = Ippon
- 2nd number = Waza-ari
- 3rd number = Yuko

=== Bracket ===
Preliminaries
Nikola Gušić (MNE)	100
Elio Verde (ITA)	000
Clément Czukiewycz (FRA)	120
Cédric Bessi (MON)	000
Ahmed Alkoeseh (LBA)	000
Ahmed Abou El Kher (EGY)	100
Ilija Ciganović (SRB)	001
Andraž Jereb (SLO)	010

Quarter Finals
Sugoi Uriarte (ESP)	100
Nikola Gušić (MNE)	000
Clément Czukiewycz (FRA)	000
Ahmed Mohamedi (ALG)	100
Houcem Khalfaoui (TUN)	000
Ahmed Abou El Kher (EGY)	100
Andraž Jereb (SLO)	100
Murat Doğan (TUR)	000

Semi Finals
Sugoi Uriarte (ESP)	110
Ahmed Mohamedi (ALG)	000
Ahmed Abou El Kher (EGY)	000
Andraž Jereb (SLO)	100

Final
Sugoi Uriarte (ESP)	001
Andraž Jereb (SLO)	000

=== Repechage round ===
Two bronze medals will be awarded.

Semifinals
Nikola Gušić (MNE)	100
Clément Czukiewycz (FRA)	000
Houcem Khalfaoui (TUN)	100
Murat Doğan (TUR)	010

Finals
Ahmed Abou El Kher (EGY)	000
Nikola Gušić (MNE)	100
Ahmed Mohamedi (ALG)	011
Houcem Khalfaoui (TUN)	120
