= Tennis at the 2013 Mediterranean Games – Men's singles =

Men's singles
- Tennis at the 2013 Mediterranean Games

Events
Singles	men	women
Doubles	men	women
- Mediterranean Games

The men's singles event at the 2013 Mediterranean Games was held from 24 to 29 June at the Mersin Tennis Complex.

Blaž Rola of Slovenia won the gold medal, defeating Marsel İlhan of Turkey in the final, 6–7^{(6–8)}, 6–2, 3–6, 7–6^{(7–4)}, 6–2.

Malek Jaziri of Tunisia won the bronze medal, defeating his fellow countryman Mohamed Haythem Abid in the bronze medal match, 7–5, 6–3.

== Medalists ==
Gold	Silver	Bronze
Blaž Rola; Slovenia	Marsel İlhan; Turkey	Malek Jaziri; Tunisia

== Seeds ==
1. Malek Jaziri (TUN) (semifinals; bronze medalists)
2. Marsel İlhan (TUR) (final; silver medalists)
3. Blaž Rola (SLO) (champions; gold medalists)
4. Marco Cecchinato (ITA) (Quarterfinal)

=== Draw ===
First round
Albert Alcaraz Ivorra (ESP)	6	7
Markos Kalovelonis (GRE)	4	7
3	Blaž Rola (SLO)	6	6
Mohanad Al-Houni (LBA)	2	0
Stefano Travaglia (ITA)	6	6
Anıl Yüksel (TUR)	1	4
Mohamed Haythem Abid (TUN)	6	6
Shendrit Deari (MKD)	2	4
David Pérez Sanz (ESP)	1	3
4	Marco Cecchinato (ITA)	6	6
Faaris Ghasya (LBA)	6	6
Lucas Catarina (MON)	3	1
Tomislav Ternar (SLO)	7^{5}	1	3
2	Marsel İlhan (TUR)	6^{5}	6	6

Quarterfinals
1	Malek Jaziri (TUN)	3	7	6
Albert Alcaraz Ivorra (ESP)	6	6^{8}	1
3	Blaž Rola (SLO)	4	6	6
Stefano Travaglia (ITA)	6	3	2
Mohamed Haythem Abid (TUN)	6	1	7
4	Marco Cecchinato (ITA)	4	6	6^{6}
Faaris Ghasya (LBA)	4	1
2	Marsel İlhan (TUR)	6	6

Semifinals
1	Malek Jaziri (TUN)	3	2
3	Blaž Rola (SLO)	6	6
Mohamed Haythem Abid (TUN)	6	3	4
2	Marsel İlhan (TUR)	4	6	6

Gold medal match
3	Blaž Rola (SLO)	6^{6}	6	3
2	Marsel İlhan (TUR)	7	2	6
Bronze medal match
1	Malek Jaziri (TUN)	7	6
Mohamed Haythem Abid (TUN)	5	3
