= Swimming at the 2013 Mediterranean Games – Women's 200 metre individual medley =

Women's 200 metre individual medley at the 2013 Mediterranean Games
- Dates: June 21, 2013
- Competitors: 12 from 8 nations
- Winning time: 2:14.40

Medalists
gold medal	Anja Klinar	Slovenia
silver medal	Stefania Pirozzi	Italy
bronze medal	Carlotta Toni	Italy

The women's 200 metre individual medley competition of the swimming events at the 2013 Mediterranean Games took place on June 21 at the Mersin Olympic Swimming Pool in Mersin, Turkey.

The race consisted of four lengths of the pool in four different styles.

== Records ==
Prior to this competition, the existing world and Mediterranean Games records were as follows:

World record	Ariana Kukors (USA)	2:06.15	Rome, Italy	July 27, 2009
Mediterranean Games record	Camille Muffat (FRA)	2:10.36	Pescara, Italy	June 27, 2009

== Results ==
All times are in minutes and seconds.

KEY:	q	Fastest non-qualifiers	Q	Qualified	GR	Games record	NR	National record	PB	Personal best	SB	Seasonal best

=== Heats ===
Rank	Heat	Lane	Athlete	Time	Notes
1	1	4	Anja Klinar (SLO)	2:17.70	Q
2	2	3	Catalina Corro (ESP)	2:18.72	Q
3	2	4	Stefania Pirozzi (ITA)	2:18.93	Q
4	2	5	Carlotta Toni (ITA)	2:19.06	Q
4	1	5	Fantine Lesaffre (FRA)	2:19.06	Q
6	2	6	Sarra Lajnef (TUN)	2:19.73	Q
7	1	6	Gizem Bozkurt (TUR)	2:21.03	Q
8	2	2	Konstantina Papailia (GRE)	2:21.34	Q
9	2	7	Melisa Akarsu (TUR)	2:21.40	
10	1	7	Souad Cherouati (ALG)	2:23.66	
11	1	3	Tanja Šmid (SLO)	2:25.69	
	1	2	Afroditi Giareni (GRE)	DNS	

=== Final ===
Rank	Lane	Athlete	Time	Notes
1st place, gold medalist(s)	4	Anja Klinar (SLO)	2:14.40	
2nd place, silver medalist(s)	3	Stefania Pirozzi (ITA)	2:16.12	
3rd place, bronze medalist(s)	6	Carlotta Toni (ITA)	2:16.24	
4	1	Gizem Bozkurt (TUR)	2:17.08	
5	2	Fantine Lesaffre (FRA)	2:17.27	
6	5	Catalina Corro (ESP)	2:17.68	
7	8	Konstantina Papailia (GRE)	2:20.12	
8	7	Sarra Lajnef (TUN)	2:20.70	
