= Slovenia at the 2013 Mediterranean Games =

- IOC code: SLO
- NOC: Olympic Committee of Slovenia

in Mersin
- Competitors: 145 in 18 sports
- Flag bearer: Lucija Polavder
- Medals Ranked 7th: Gold 13 Silver 11 Bronze 11 Total 35

Mediterranean Games appearances (overview)
- 1993; 1997; 2001; 2005; 2009; 2013; 2018; 2022

Other related appearances
- Yugoslavia (1951–1991)

Slovenia competed at the 2013 Mediterranean Games in Mersin, Turkey held from 20–30 June 2013. They were represented by 145 athletes in 18 sports.

== Medalists ==
Medal	Name	Sport	Event	Date
Gold	Vlora Bedeti	Judo	Women's −57 kg	21 June
Gold	Anja Klinar	Swimming	Women's 200 m ind. medley	21 June
Gold	Lucija Polavder	Judo	Women's +78 kg	23 June
Gold	Matjaž Ceraj	Judo	Men's +100 kg	23 June
Gold	Anja Klinar	Swimming	Women's 400 m ind. medley	23 June
Gold	Sašo Bertoncelj	Artistic gymnastics	Men's pommel horse	24 June
Gold	Damir Dugonjič	Swimming	Men's 50 m breaststroke	25 June
Gold	Tadeja Sodec	Bocce	Precision throw Women	26 June
Gold	Špela Ponomarenko Janić	Canoeing	K-1 500m	28 June
Gold	Martina Ratej	Athletics	Women's Javelin Throw	28 June
Gold	Blaž Rola and Tomislav Ternar	Tennis	Men's doubles	28 June
Gold	Špela Ponomarenko Janić	Canoeing	K-1 200m	29 June
Gold	Blaž Rola	Tennis	Men's singles	29 June
Silver	Petra Nareks	Judo	Women's 52 kg	21 June
Silver	Andraž Jereb	Judo	Men's 66 kg	21 June
Silver	Anja Klinar	Swimming	Women's 400 m freestyle	21 June
Silver	Nina Miloševič	Judo	Women's 63 kg	22 June
Silver	Aljaž Sedej	Judo	Men's 81 kg	22 June
Silver	Mojca Sagmeister	Swimming	Women's 200 m freestyle	24 June
Silver	Anja Klinar	Swimming	Women's 200 m butterfly	25 June
Bronze	Ana Petrušič	Taekwondo	Women's −49 kg	21 June
Bronze	Anka Pogačnik	Judo	Women's 70 kg	22 June
Bronze	Anja Klinar; Mojca Sagmeister; Spela Bohinc; Tanja Smid	Swimming	Women's 4 × 200m freestyle relay	24 June

== Archery ==
Men

Athlete	Event	Ranking round		Round of 48	Round of 32	Round of 16	Quarterfinals	Semifinals	Final / BM	
Athlete	Event	Score	Seed	Opposition Score	Opposition Score	Opposition Score	Opposition Score	Opposition Score	Opposition Score	Rank
Jaka Komočar	Individual									
Jan Rijavec	Individual									
Klemen Štrajhar	Individual									
Jaka Komočar; Jan Rijavec; Klemen Štrajhar	Team			—N/a						

Women

Athlete	Event	Ranking round		Round of 48	Round of 32	Round of 16	Quarterfinals	Semifinals	Final / BM	
Athlete	Event	Score	Seed	Opposition Score	Opposition Score	Opposition Score	Opposition Score	Opposition Score	Opposition Score	Rank
Ana Umer	Individual									
Brina Božič	Individual									
Darja Verbič	Individual									
Ana Umer; Brina Božič; Darja Verbič	Team			—N/a						

== Athletics ==
Key

- Note–Ranks given for track events are within the athlete's heat only
- Q = Qualified for the next round
- q = Qualified for the next round as a fastest loser or, in field events, by position without achieving the qualifying target
- NR = National record
- N/A = Round not applicable for the event
- Bye = Athlete not required to compete in round

Men
Track & road events

Athlete	Event	Final	
Athlete	Event	Result	Rank
Mitja Kosovelj	Half marathon		

Field events

Athlete	Event	Final	
Athlete	Event	Distance	Position
Matija Kranjc	Javelin throw		
Rožle Prezelj	High jump		
Robert Renner	Pole vault		

Women
Track & road events

Athlete	Event	Semifinal		Final	
Athlete	Event	Result	Rank	Result	Rank
Sara Strajnar	100 m				
Kristina Žumer	100 m				
Sabina Velt	200 m				
Maruša Mišmaš	1500 m				
Marina Tomić	100 m hurdles				

Field events

Athlete	Event	Final	
Athlete	Event	Distance	Position
Nina Kolarič	Long jump		
Martina Ratej	Javelin throw		
Snežana Rodič	Triple jump		
Tina Šutej	Pole vault		

== Badminton ==
Athlete	Event	Group Stage				Quarterfinal	Semifinal	Final / BM	
Athlete	Event	Opposition Score	Opposition Score	Opposition Score	Rank	Opposition Score	Opposition Score	Opposition Score	Rank
Iztok Utroša	Men's singles								
Iztok Utroša; Miha Horvat	Men's doubles								
Nika Koncut	Women's singles								
Maja Tvrdy	Women's singles								
Nika Koncut; Maja Tvrdy	Women's doubles								

== Bocce ==
Lyonnaise

Athlete	Event	Elimination		Quarterfinal		Semifinal		Final / BM	
Athlete	Event	Score	Rank	Score	Rank	Score	Rank	Score	Rank
Aleš Borčnik	Men's progressive throw								
Davor Janžić	Men's precision throw								
Nina Novak	Women's progressive throw								
Tadeja Sodec	Women's precision throw								

== Boxing ==
Men

Athlete	Event	Round of 16	Quarterfinals	Semifinals	Final	
Athlete	Event	Opposition Result	Opposition Result	Opposition Result	Opposition Result	Rank
Gregor Debeljak	Lightweight					
Aljaž Venko	Middleweight					

== Canoeing ==
Athlete	Event	Heats		Semifinals		Final	
Athlete	Event	Time	Rank	Time	Rank	Time	Rank
Jošt Zakrajšek	Men's K-1 1000 m						
Špela Ponomarenko	Women's K-1 500 m						

Legend: FA = Qualify to final (medal); FB = Qualify to final B (non-medal)

== Gymnastics ==
=== Artistic ===
Men

Athlete	Event	Qualification								Final							
Athlete	Event	Apparatus						Total	Rank	Apparatus						Total	Rank
Athlete	Event	F	PH	R	V	PB	HB	Total	Rank	F	PH	R	V	PB	HB	Total	Rank
Alen Dimič	All-around																
Sašo Bertoncelj	All-around																

Women
Team

Athlete	Event	Final					
Athlete	Event	Apparatus				Total	Rank
Athlete	Event	F	V	UB	BB	Total	Rank
Teja Belak	Team						
Saša Golob	Team						
Tjaša Kysselef	Team						
Carmen Horvat	Team						
Tina Ribič	Team						
Total	Team						

=== Rhythmic ===
Athlete	Event	Qualification						Final					
Athlete	Event	Hoop	Ball	Clubs	Ribbon	Total	Rank	Hoop	Ball	Clubs	Ribbon	Total	Rank
Sara Kragulj	All-around												

== Handball ==
=== Men's tournament ===
Team

- Urban Lesjak
- Matevž Skok
- Matej Gaber
- Uroš Bundalo
- Vid Poteko
- Simon Razgor
- Niko Medved
- Sebastian Skube
- Borut Mačkovšek
- Mario Šoštarič
- Gašper Marguč
- Jure Dolenec
- Miha Svetelšek
- Mitja Nosan
- Jernej Papež
- Dean Bombač

=== Women's tournament ===
Team

- Katja Čerenjak
- Sanja Gregorc
- Ana Gros
- Neli Irman
- Nina Jeriček
- Lina Krhlikar
- Barbara Lazović
- Miša Marinček
- Tamara Mavsar
- Maxim Eva Pelikan
- Ana Petrinja
- Sergeja Stefanišin
- Maja Šon
- Urška Vidič
- Branka Zec
- Maja Zrnec

== Judo ==
Men

Athlete	Event	Round of 16	Quarterfinals	Semifinals	Repechage	Final / BM	
Athlete	Event	Opposition Result	Opposition Result	Opposition Result	Opposition Result	Opposition Result	Rank
Matjaž Trbovc	−60 kg						
Andraž Jereb	−66 kg						
Marko Prodan	−73 kg						
Aljaž Sedej	−81 kg						
Tadej Mulec	−90 kg						
Matjaž Ceraj	+100 kg						

Women

Athlete	Event	Round of 16	Quarterfinals	Semifinals	Repechage	Final / BM	
Athlete	Event	Opposition Result	Opposition Result	Opposition Result	Opposition Result	Opposition Result	Rank
Petra Nareks	−52 kg						
Vlora Bedeti	−57 kg						
Nina Miloševič	−63 kg						
Anka Pogačnik	−70 kg						
Lucija Polavder	+78 kg						

== Karate ==
Men

Athlete	Event	Round of 16	Quarterfinals	Semifinals	Repechage 1	Repechage 2	Final / BM	
Athlete	Event	Opposition Result	Opposition Result	Opposition Result	Opposition Result	Opposition Result	Opposition Result	Rank
Mladen Railić	−67 kg							
Filip Španbauer	−75 kg							
Juš Markač	−84 kg							
Sebastjan Budihna	+84 kg							

== Rowing ==
Men

Athlete	Event	Heats		Semifinals		Final	
Athlete	Event	Time	Rank	Time	Rank	Time	Rank
Rajko Hrvat	Lightweight single sculls						
Jan Špik	Single sculls						
Aleš Zupan; Jure Grace	Double sculls						

Women

Athlete	Event	Heats		Semifinals		Final	
Athlete	Event	Time	Rank	Time	Rank	Time	Rank
Anja Šešum	Single sculls						

== Sailing ==
Men

Athlete	Event	Race											Net points	Final rank
Athlete	Event	1	2	3	4	5	6	7	8	9	10	M*	Net points	Final rank
Nik Pletikos	Laser													
Matej Valič	Laser													
Andraž Gulič; Mitja Nevečny	470													

Women

Athlete	Event	Race											Net points	Final rank
Athlete	Event	1	2	3	4	5	6	7	8	9	10	M*	Net points	Final rank
Kim Pletikos	Laser Radial													
Tina Mrak; Veronika Macarol	470													

== Shooting ==
Men

Athlete	Event	Qualification		Final	
Athlete	Event	Points	Rank	Points	Rank
Rajmond Debevec	50 m rifle 3 positions				
Blaž Kunšek	10 m air pistol				
Željko Moičevič	10 m air rifle				
Grega Potočnik	10 m air rifle				
Boštjan Maček	Trap				
Matej Žniderčić	Trap				

Women

Athlete	Event	Qualification		Final	
Athlete	Event	Points	Rank	Points	Rank
Petra Dobravec	10 m air pistol				
Živa Dvoršak	10 m air rifle				

== Swimming ==
Men

Athlete	Event	Heat		Final	
Athlete	Event	Time	Rank	Time	Rank
Anže Tavčar	50 m freestyle				
Žiga Cerkovnik	100 m freestyle				
Martin Bau	400 m freestyle	3:57.63	11	did not advance	
Jan Karel Petrič	1500 m freestyle				
Damir Dugonjič	50 m breaststroke				1st place, gold medalist(s)
Matjaž Markič	50 m breaststroke				
Robert Žbogar	200 m butterfly				

Women

Athlete	Event	Heat		Final	
Athlete	Event	Time	Rank	Time	Rank
Mojca Sagmeister	200 m freestyle				2nd place, silver medalist(s)
Špela Bohinc	800 m freestyle	—N/a		8:46.57	4
Tjaša Vozel	800 m freestyle				
Lucija Kous	50 m backstroke	29.95	9	did not advance	
Tjaša Vozel	100 m breaststroke	1:12.34	9	did not advance	
Neža Marčun	200 m breaststroke				
Tanja Šmid	200 m breaststroke				
Anja Klinar	200 m butterfly				2nd place, silver medalist(s)
Tanja Šmid	200 m individual medley	2:25.69	11	did not advance	
Anja Klinar	200 m individual medley	2:17.70	1 Q	2:14.40	1st place, gold medalist(s)
Anja Klinar	400 m individual medley	4:48.44	2 Q	4:40.49	1st place, gold medalist(s)

== Table tennis ==
Women

Athlete	Event	Round Robin 1				Round Robin 2				Quarterfinal	Semifinal	Final / BM	
Athlete	Event	Opposition Score	Opposition Score	Opposition Score	Rank	Opposition Score	Opposition Score	Opposition Score	Rank	Opposition Score	Opposition Score	Opposition Score	Rank
Manca Fajmut	Singles												
Jana Tomazini	Singles												
Manca Fajmut; Jana Tomazini	Team					—N/a							

== Taekwondo ==
Athlete	Event	Round of 16	Quarterfinals	Semifinals	Repechage 1	Repechage 2	Final / BM	
Athlete	Event	Opposition Result	Opposition Result	Opposition Result	Opposition Result	Opposition Result	Opposition Result	Rank
Ana Petrušič	Women's −49 kg							
Dunja Lemajič	Women's −67 kg							

== Tennis ==
Men

Athlete	Event	Round of 32	Round of 16	Quarterfinals	Semifinals	Final / BM	
Athlete	Event	Opposition Score	Opposition Score	Opposition Score	Opposition Score	Opposition Score	Rank
Blaž Rola	Singles						
Tomislav Ternar	Singles						
Blaž Rola; Tomislav Ternar	Doubles						

Women

Athlete	Event	Round of 32	Round of 16	Quarterfinals	Semifinals	Final / BM	
Athlete	Event	Opposition Score	Opposition Score	Opposition Score	Opposition Score	Opposition Score	Rank
Maša Marc	Singles						
Manca Pislak	Singles						
Maša Marc; Manca Pislak	Doubles						

== Volleyball ==
=== Beach ===
Athlete	Event	Preliminary round	Standing	Quarterfinals	Semifinals	Final / BM	
Athlete	Event	Opposition Score	Standing	Opposition Score	Opposition Score	Opposition Score	Rank
Andreja Vodeb; Simona Fabjan	Women's						

=== Indoor ===
==== Women's tournament ====
Team

- Mojca Božič
- Monika Potokar
- Sara Valenčič
- Urška Igličar
- Živa Recek
- Sara Hutinski
- Elena Kučej
- Valentina Založnik
- Iza Mlakar
- Meta Jerala
- Saša Planinšec
- Angelina Ajnihar

Standings

Pos	Team	Pld	W	L	Pts	SW	SL	SR	SPW	SPL	SPR
1	Turkey	2	2	0	6	6	1	6.000	169	121	1.397
2	Slovenia	2	1	1	3	3	3	1.000	128	134	0.955
3	Greece	2	0	2	0	1	6	0.167	127	169	0.751

Results

Date	Time		Score		Set 1	Set 2	Set 3	Set 4	Set 5	Total	Report
22-Jun	15:30	Slovenia	–	Greece							
24-Jun	18:00	Turkey	–	Slovenia							

== Wrestling ==
Men's Greco-Roman

Athlete	Event	Qualification	Round of 16	Quarterfinal	Semifinal	Repechage 1	Repechage 2	Final / BM	
Athlete	Event	Opposition Result	Opposition Result	Opposition Result	Opposition Result	Opposition Result	Opposition Result	Opposition Result	Rank
Jure Kuhar	−74 kg								
Dejan Šernek	−96 kg								
