= Artistic gymnastics at the 2013 Mediterranean Games – Men's qualification =

Qualifications for Men's artistic gymnastic competitions at the 2013 Mediterranean Games will be held at the Mersin Gymnastics Hall on June 22. The results of the qualification will determine the qualifiers to the finals: 24 gymnasts in the all-around final, and 8 gymnasts in each of 6 apparatus finals. The competition is divided to 3 subdivisions. The first subdivision will take place at 09:30 Eastern European Summer Time (UTC+3); followed by the second and third subdivisions at 13:00 and 15:45 respectively.

== Subdivisions ==
The groups are divided into the three subdivisions after a draw held by the Fédération Internationale de Gymnastique on May 31. The groups rotate through each of the six apparatuses together.

=== Subdivision 1 ===
- Group 1
  - Egypt (team)
  - Croatia (2 athletes)
- Group 2
  - Spain (team)
  - Libya (2 athletes)
- Group 3
  - France (team)
  - Albania (1 athlete)

=== Subdivision 2 ===
- Group 4
  - Syria (team)
  - Tunisia (team)
- Group 5
  - Greece (team)
  - (North Macedonia) Macedonia (2 athletes)
- Group 6
  - Turkey (team)
  - Algeria (2 athletes)

=== Subdivision 3 ===
- Group 7
  - Slovenia (team)
- Group 8
  - Cyprus (team)
  - Monaco (1 athlete)
- Group 9
  - Italy (team)
  - Lebanon (2 athletes)
