= Tennis at the 2013 Mediterranean Games =

- Venue: Mersin Tennis Complex
- Dates: 24–29 June

Tennis at the 2013 Mediterranean Games

Champions

Men's singles
- Blaž Rola; Slovenia

Women's singles
- Çağla Büyükakçay; Turkey

Men's doubles
- Blaž Rola / Tomislav Ternar; Slovenia

Women's doubles
- Çağla Büyükakçay / Pemra Özgen; Turkey
← 2009 ·	Mediterranean Games	· 2018 →

The tennis competitions at the 2013 Mediterranean Games in Mersin took place between 24 June and 29 June at the Mersin Tennis Complex with capacity for 3000.

Athletes competed in 4 events.

== Medal summary ==
=== Medalists ===
Event	Gold	Silver	Bronze
Men's singles	Blaž Rola; Slovenia	Marsel İlhan; Turkey	Malek Jaziri; Tunisia
Men's doubles	Blaž Rola and Tomislav Ternar; Slovenia	Mohamed Haythem Abid and Malek Jaziri; Tunisia	Albert Alcaraz Ivorra and David Perez Sanz; Spain
Women's singles	Çağla Büyükakçay; Turkey	Sara Sorribes Tormo; Spain	Federica Di Sarra; Italy
Women's doubles	Çağla Büyükakçay and Pemra Özgen; Turkey	Federica Di Sarra and Anastasia Grymalska; Italy	Nour Abbès and Ons Jabeur; Tunisia

== Medal table ==
Key:

* Host nation (Turkey)

Rank	Nation	Gold	Silver	Bronze	Total
1	Turkey*	2	1	0	3
2	Slovenia	2	0	0	2
3	Tunisia	0	1	2	3
4	Italy	0	1	1	2
4	Spain	0	1	1	2
Totals (5 entries)		4	4	4	12
