= Trendyol =

E-commerce company in Turkey

- Industry: E-commerce
- Founded: 2010; 16 years ago
- Founders: Demet Mutlu; Evren Üçok; Begüm Tekin
- Headquarters: Istanbul, Turkey
- Key people: Evren Üçok (Chairperson); Erdem Inan (CEO); Çağlayan Çetin (President)
- Owner: Alibaba Group (70%)
- Website: trendyol.com

Trendyol is a Turkish e-commerce platform headquartered in Istanbul. The company was founded in 2010 by Demet Mutlu, Evren Üçok, and Begüm Tekin.

As of 2024, the Chinese company Alibaba Group was the company's largest shareholder, holding 70% of shares.

== History ==
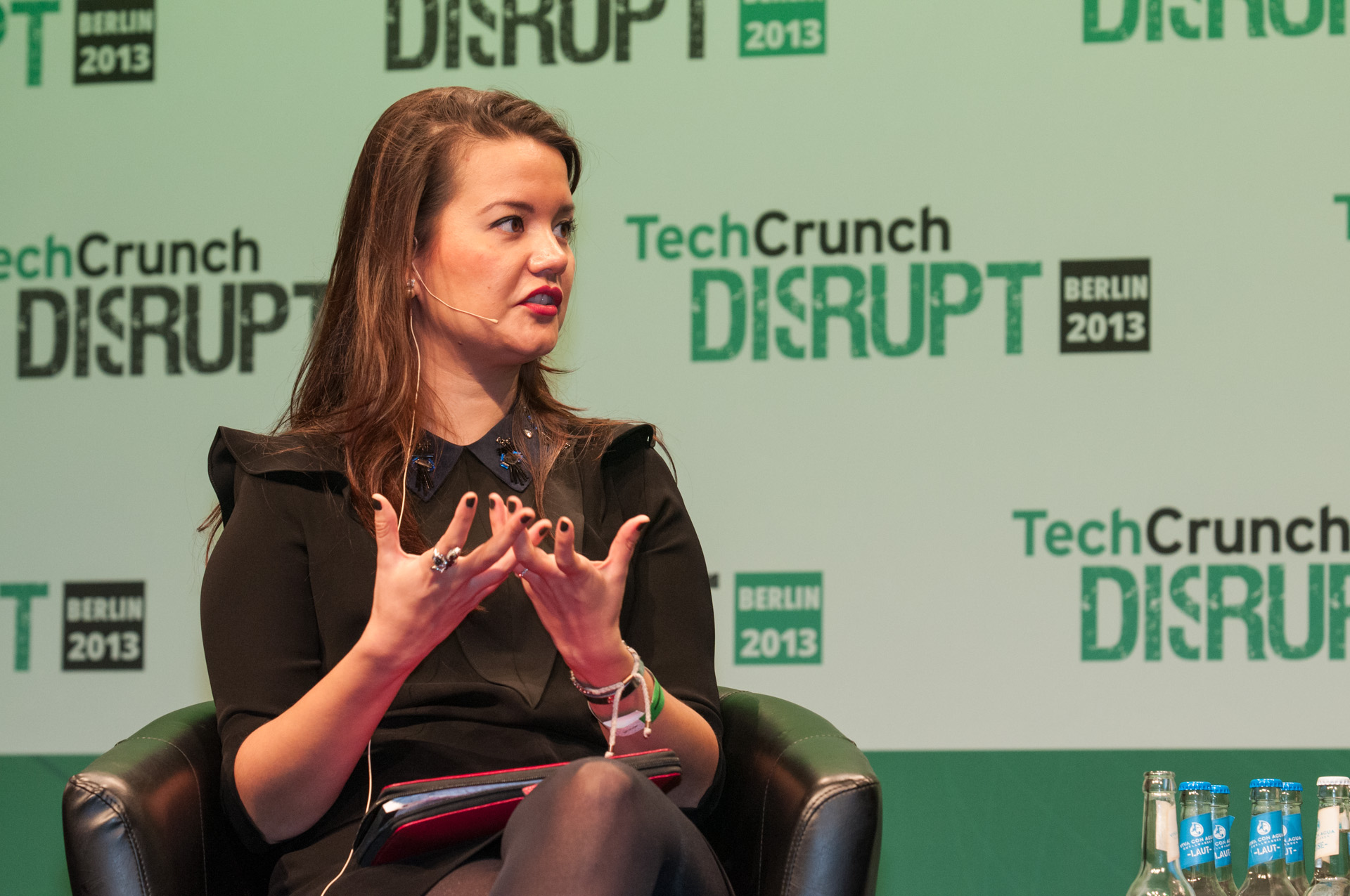
Trendyol was co-founded by Demet Mutlu (pictured in 2013) in 2010.

Trendyol was co-founded by Demet Mutlu, Evren Üçok, and Begüm Tekin, in 2010. Üçok is the Chairperson, Erdem Inan is the CEO, and Çağlayan Çetin is the President.

Dolap was founded in 2016 as a second-hand product trading platform and acquired by Trendyol in 2018. 1.4 million individual sellers are currently active on Dolap.

Trendyol Express was founded as a delivery network in 2018.

The company's Trendyol Tech group was approved as a research and development centre in 2019 by the Ministry of Industry and Technology.

Trendyol entered the European market in October 2020, launching a website serving 27 countries.

In 2022, Trendyol became the first Turkish e-commerce business to design a sustainability plan. The company's plan addresses carbon reduction, human rights, packing and production, waste management, and diversity, equity, and inclusion (DEI). Trendyol also establishes digital centers offering technology training and encouraging smart agriculture practices in rural Turkey as part of the Villages of Tomorrow programme in collaboration with the United Nations Development Programme, and has dedicated initiatives that support women's empowerment and young artists.

The company's first office outside Turkey opened in Berlin in 2022. In late 2023, Trendyol announced plans to expand operations in Eastern Europe in 2024, starting in the Czech Republic, Greece, Hungary, and Romania. Trendyol confirmed plans to open a warehouse in Bucharest and offices in Romania in 2025.

On 12 July 2023, Trendyol took over sponsorship of the Süper Lig and TFF First League football leagues from Spor Toto, by paying ₺700.000.000.

In 2023, Trendyol announced a memorandum of understanding with a Saudi Arabian retail company to launch a fashion platform in the Gulf. Trendyol's mobile app in the Gulf region debuted in August 2023 and reached 30,000 orders per day by November. Trendyol also operates in Bahrain, Kuwait, Oman, Qatar, and the United Arab Emirates.

In 2023, Trendyol signed an agreement with PASHA Holding to start operating in Azerbaijan in May.

In 2024, the company launched its first in-house large language model, won in the "e-export" category at the Turkish Exporters Assembly's award ceremony, and co-organized an e-commerce hackathon in Adana Province for Teknofest. In the same year, Trendyol debuted its first own-brand womenswear Ramadan collection for the Gulf and opened a pop-up store in the region at a shopping mall in Riyadh. The company also launched an artificial intelligence-designed fashion collection exclusive to Gulf nations and confirmed plans to open offices in Dubai and Riyadh.

In October 2024, Trendyol had approximately 2 million customers in Azerbaijan and inaugurated its local office in Baku.

As of 2025, the company was one of twelve signatories to the European Union Consumer Protection Commitment, a framework of voluntary measures aimed at strengthening product safety and consumers’ digital rights throughout the EU.

== Funding and ownership ==
Six months after Trendyol was founded in 2010, American firm Tiger Global invested in the company; subsequent investors included the European Bank for Reconstruction and Development and American venture capital firm Kleiner Perkins. Alibaba Group has invested $1.4 billion in Trendyol. Alibaba invested an initial $728 million dollars in 2018 and followed with an additional $350 million at a $9.4 billion valuation in 2021. There is no formal integration between Trendyol and Alibaba's other e-commerce sites even though there are vendors on Alibaba's B2B site that sell Trendyol items, they are third party resellers. Trendyol has B2B components but mostly caters to B2C in categories of fashion, grocery, and retail. By 2024 Alibaba had more than 70% share in Trendyol, with some sources quoting 86%. August 2021, Trendyol raised $1.5 billion at a $16.5 billion valuation; Abu Dhabi Developmental Holding Company (ADQ), General Atlantic, Princeville Capital, Qatar Investment Authority, and SoftBank Vision Fund 2 were among funding round participants. The investment was SoftBank's first in Turkey and Trendyol became the first Turkish business to be named a decacorn (valuation exceeding $10 billion). Alibaba has a 70 percent stake in Trendyol, as of 2024. Alibaba-owned e-commerce store Trendyol expanded to Germany in 2022. This was the first office it opened outside of Turkey, and it has plans to open subsequent offices in Amsterdam and Luxembourg in 2022, including London in 2023. It also announced plans to hire more than 200 employees for its Berlin office. In Germany, the company primarily sells clothes, but other categories are expected to be added as it launches. Trendyol products can also be available for purchase to customers in Turkey through other platforms. It was expected that by the end of 2022, around 400 million Euros would be generated.

== Operations ==
Trendyol had logistics centers in Ankara and an export operation center at Istanbul Airport in 2023.

Approximately 1.5 million customers in Germany purchase products from 200 Turkish brands via Trendyol, as of 2024.

Trendyol operates in Gulf Cooperation Council markets and has warehouses in both Saudi Arabia and the United Arab Emirates (UAE).

=== Sponsorships ===
Trendyol sponsored the Turkish National Olympic Committee and the five athletes representing Turkey at the 2020 Summer Olympics in Tokyo. The company has also sponsored national teams with the Turkish Football Federation and the Turkish Volleyball Federation, as well as the 2023–2024 season of the Süper Lig and the TFF 1. Lig. Trendyol launched an Olympic-themed line of clothing and accessories ahead of the 2024 Summer Olympics in Paris, marking the first time the International Olympic Committee partnered with a Turkish brand on merchandise. Trendyol also became an official partner of the UEFA Euro 2024 football championship as well as the Turkish National Paralympic Committee.

== Controversies ==
=== Algorithm manipulation ===
In October 2021, the Turkish Competition Authority opened an investigation to determine if Trendyol had violated competition law. The competition regulator's investigation concluded in July 2023, and Trendyol was fined approximately ₺61.3 million for systemic algorithm manipulation and unfair use of third party marketplace data.

=== Bribery allegations ===
After the E-Commerce Law was published in the Official Gazette of Turkey Republic in 2022, Trendyol was accused of paying unregistered money to Cumhuriyet Newspaper in exchange for negative press against the law. This accusation was not accepted by the newspaper. Cumhuriyet Newspaper Foundation filed a criminal complaint against the officials of the period, alleging that they "received unregistered money" in exchange for manipulative news against the e-commerce law that came into force in January 2023.
