= Blaž Rola =

Slovenian tennis player (born 1990)

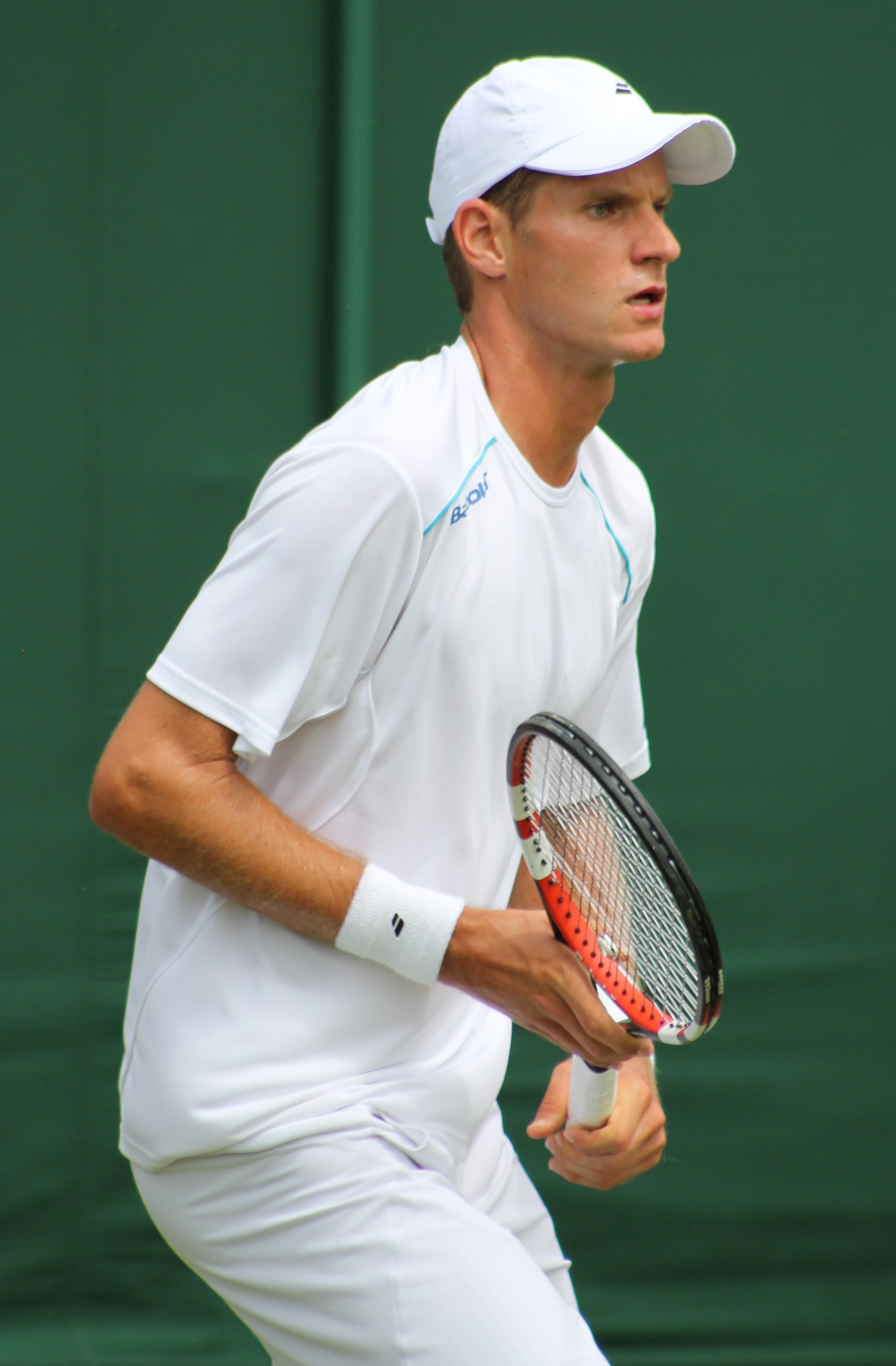
- Country (sports): Slovenia
- Residence: Ptuj, Slovenia
- Born: 5 October 1990 (age 36) Ptuj, SR Slovenia, Yugoslavia
- Height: 1.93 m (6 ft 4 in)
- Turned pro: 2013
- Retired: Nov 2024 (last match played)
- Plays: Left-handed (two-handed backhand)
- College: Ohio State University
- Prize money: $1,148,909

Singles
- Career record: 17–23
- Career titles: 0
- Highest ranking: No. 78 (5 January 2015)

Grand Slam singles results
- Australian Open: 2R (2014)
- French Open: 1R (2019)
- Wimbledon: 2R (2014)
- US Open: 1R (2014)

Doubles
- Career record: 8–8
- Career titles: 1
- Highest ranking: No. 186 (22 August 2016)
Medal record
Representing Slovenia
Men's Tennis
Mediterranean Games
Gold medal – first place	2013 Mersin	Singles
Gold medal – first place	2013 Mersin	Doubles

Blaž Rola (born 5 October 1990) is a Slovenian former tennis player. His highest career ranking is No. 78 in singles and No. 186 in doubles. In his career, he has won one ATP doubles title, nine singles and six doubles ITF Futures and five ATP Challengers in singles and eight in doubles. He represented Slovenia on the Slovenia Davis Cup team.

== Personal life ==
Rola was born in Ptuj, the oldest Slovenian town.

== Career ==
At the 2013 Mediterranean Games in Mersin, Turkey, he won gold in singles and doubles.

At the 2014 Aegon Championships, London, and the 2014 Aegon International, Eastbourne, Rola lost in the first round on both occasions. He played in the main draw of 2014 Wimbledon Championships for the first time in his career and lost 1–6, 1–6, 0–6 in the second round against Andy Murray.

At the 2021 Split Open, Rola defeated Blaž Kavčič to win his fifth Challenger singles title.

In July 2023, Rola won his first title at the ATP 250 2023 Croatia Open Umag with Nino Serdarušić, the team having received its wildcard just before the draw was made.

== ATP Tour finals ==
=== Doubles: 1 (1 title) ===
Legend Grand Slam tournaments (0–0) ATP World Tour Finals (0–0) ATP World Tour Masters 1000 (0–0) ATP World Tour 500 Series (0–0) ATP World Tour 250 Series (1–0)	Finals by surface Hard (0–0) Clay (1–0) Grass (0–0)	Finals by setting Outdoor (1–0) Indoor (0–0)

Result	W–L	Date	Tournament	Tier	Surface	Partner	Opponents	Score
Win	1–0	Jul 2023	Croatia Open, Umag	250 Series	Clay	(Croatia) Nino Serdarušić	(Italy) Simone Bolelli (Italy) Andrea Vavassori	4–6, 7–6^{(7–2)}, [15–13]

== ATP Challenger and ITF Futures finals ==
=== Singles: 29 (15–14) ===
Legend (singles) ATP Challenger Tour (5–8) ITF Futures Tour (10–6)	Titles by surface Hard (4–2) Clay (11–12) Grass (0–0) Carpet (0–0)

Result	W–L	Date	Tournament	Tier	Surface	Opponent	Score
Loss	0–1	May 2010	Slovenia F1, Kamnik	Futures	Clay	(Germany) Marcel Zimmermann	6–3, 2–6, 4–6
Win	1–1	Jun 2010	Slovenia F3, Maribor	Futures	Clay	(Hungary) György Balázs	2–6, 6–4, 6–4
Loss	1–2	Jul 2010	Italy F18, Modena	Futures	Clay	(Italy) Matteo Viola	1–6, 6–4, 1–6
Win	2–2	Aug 2010	Austria F3, Bad Waltersdorf	Futures	Clay	(Austria) Pascal Brunner	7–5, 6–3
Win	3–2	Jul 2012	USA F17, Innisbrook	Futures	Clay	(Venezuela) Luis David Martínez	6–2, 6–1
Loss	3–3	Jul 2012	Austria F1, Telfs	Futures	Clay	(Austria) Marc Rath	6–2, 3–6, 2–6
Win	4–3	Jul 2012	Austria F3, Bad Waltersdorf	Futures	Clay	(Austria) Nicolas Reissig	6–3, 6–2
Loss	4–4	Aug 2012	Croatia F7, Čakovec	Futures	Clay	(Germany) Peter Heller	4–6, 0–6
Win	5–4	Aug 2012	Croatia F8, Vinkovci	Futures	Clay	(Croatia) Toni Androić	6–2, 6–2
Win	6–4	Sep 2012	Austria F9, Vogau	Futures	Clay	(Austria) Andreas Haider-Maurer	6–2, 7–6^{(7–5)}
Win	7–4	Jun 2013	Mexico F12, Quintana Roo	Futures	Hard	(Brazil) José Pereira	7–6^{(8–6)}, 6–4
Loss	7–5	Aug 2013	Rio de Janeiro, Brazil	Challenger	Clay	(Argentina) Agustín Velotti	3–6, 4–6
Win	8–5	Aug 2013	Poland F5, Bytom	Futures	Clay	(Serbia) Filip Krajinović	w/o
Win	9–5	Oct 2013	Armenia F2, Yerevan	Futures	Clay	(Netherlands) Boy Westerhof	6–2, 6–4
Loss	9–6	Oct 2013	Croatia F11, Dubrovnik	Futures	Clay	(Slovenia) Janez Semrajc	4–6, 7–5, 3–6
Win	10–6	Mar 2014	Guangzhou, China, P.R.	Challenger	Hard	(Japan) Yūichi Sugita	6–7^{(4–7)}, 6–4, 6–3
Loss	10–7	Mar 2014	Panama City, Panama	Challenger	Clay	(Spain) Pere Riba	5–7, 7–5, 2–6
Loss	10–8	Apr 2014	São Paulo, Brazil	Challenger	Clay	(Brazil) Rogério Dutra Silva	4–6, 2–6
Loss	10–9	Jul 2014	Poznań, Poland	Challenger	Clay	(Belgium) David Goffin	4–6, 2–6
Win	11–9	Apr 2015	Santos, Brazil	Challenger	Clay	(Belgium) Germain Gigounon	6–3, 3–6, 6–3
Loss	11–10	Jun 2016	Perugia, Italy	Challenger	Clay	(Argentina) Nicolás Kicker	6–2, 3–6, 0–6
Win	12–10	Apr 2017	Tallahassee, USA	Challenger	Clay	(India) Ramkumar Ramanathan	6–2, 6–7^{(6–8)}, 7–5
Loss	12–11	Mar 2018	Quijing, China, P.R.	Challenger	Hard	(Tunisia) Malek Jaziri	6–7^{(5–7)}, 1–6
Loss	12–12	Apr 2018	Panama City, Panama	Challenger	Clay	(Argentina) Carlos Berlocq	2–6, 0–6
Loss	12–13	Oct 2018	Las Vegas, USA	Challenger	Hard	(Australia) Thanasi Kokkinakis	4–6, 4–6
Win	13–13	Apr 2019	León, Mexico	Challenger	Hard	(United Kingdom) Liam Broady	6–4, 4–6, 6–3
Win	14–13	Apr 2021	Split, Croatia	Challenger	Clay	(Slovenia) Blaž Kavčič	2–6, 6–3, 6–2
Win	15–13	Apr 2023	M15 Monastir, Tunisia	World Tennis Tour	Hard	(France) Adrien Gobat	7–6^{(7–4)}, 6–2
Loss	15–14	May 2024	M15 Celje, Slovenia	World Tennis Tour	Clay	(Brazil) Joao Eduardo Schiessl	6–4, 6–7^{(4–7)}, 1–6

=== Doubles: 23 (15–8) ===
Legend (doubles) ATP Challenger Tour (9–5) ITF Futures Tour (6–3)	Titles by surface Hard (4–4) Clay (10–4) Grass (0–0) Carpet (1–0)

Result	W–L	Date	Tournament	Tier	Surface	Partner	Opponents	Score
Win	1–0	Oct 2009	Croatia F9, Dubrovnik	Futures	Clay	(Slovenia) Martin Rmuš	(United Kingdom) Morgan Phillips (Croatia) Antonio Šančić	6–3, 7–6^{(9–7)}
Loss	1–1	May 2010	Bosnia & Herzegovina F3, Doboj	Futures	Clay	(Slovenia) Martin Rmuš	(Austria) Michael Linzer (Austria) Herbert Wiltschnig	w/o
Win	2–1	Jun 2010	Slovenia F3, Maribor	Futures	Clay	(Slovenia) Martin Rmuš	(Spain) Javier Martí (Spain) Sergio Pérez Pérez	6–3, 6–3
Loss	2–2	Aug 2011	Croatia F7, Vinkovci	Futures	Clay	(Croatia) Mislav Hižak	(Bosnia and Herzegovina) Tomislav Brkić (Croatia) Marin Franjičević	6–3, 3–6, [7–10]
Win	3–2	Jul 2012	USA F17, Innisbrook	Futures	Clay	(United States) Chase Buchanan	(South Africa) Keith-Patrick Crowley (United States) Joshua Zavala	6–4, 6–2
Win	4–2	Jul 2012	Austria F1, Telfs	Futures	Clay	(Slovenia) Tomislav Ternar	(Austria) Stefan Hirn (Austria) Sebastian Stiefelmeyer	6–2, 7–5
Loss	4–3	Aug 2012	Croatia F7, Čakovec	Futures	Clay	(Slovenia) Tomislav Ternar	(France) Thibault Venturino (Slovenia) Janoš Žibrat	3–6, 4–6
Win	5–3	Aug 2012	Croatia F8, Vinkovci	Futures	Clay	(Croatia) Mislav Hižak	(Bosnia and Herzegovina) Tomislav Brkić (Bosnia and Herzegovina) Aldin Šetkić	6–4, 7–6^{(7–3)}
Win	6–3	Sep 2012	Austria F9, Vogau	Futures	Clay	(Philippines) Ruben Gonzales	(Austria) Lukas Jastraunig (Austria) Tristan-Samuel Weissborn	6–2, 6–2
Loss	6–4	Jul 2013	Portorož, Slovenia	Challenger	Hard	(Slovenia) Aljaž Bedene	(Croatia) Marin Draganja (Croatia) Mate Pavić	3–6, 6–1, [5–10]
Win	7–4	Nov 2013	Toyota, Japan	Challenger	Carpet (i)	(United States) Chase Buchanan	(New Zealand) Marcus Daniell (New Zealand) Artem Sitak	4–6, 6–3, [10–4]
Loss	7–5	Jan 2014	Nouméa, New Caledonia	Challenger	Hard	(Croatia) Ante Pavić	(United States) Austin Krajicek (United States) Tennys Sandgren	6–7^{(4–7)}, 3–6
Loss	7–6	Feb 2014	Chennai, India	Challenger	Hard	(India) Sriram Balaji	(India) Yuki Bhambri (New Zealand) Michael Venus	4–6, 6–7^{(3–7)}
Win	8–6	May 2015	São Paulo, Brazil	Challenger	Clay	(United States) Chase Buchanan	(Argentina) Guido Andreozzi (Peru) Sergio Galdós	6–4, 6–4
Win	9–6	Sep 2015	Cary, USA	Challenger	Hard	(United States) Chase Buchanan	(United States) Austin Krajicek (United States) Nicholas Monroe	6–4, 6–7^{(5–7)}, [10–4]
Win	10–6	Sep 2015	Columbus, USA	Challenger	Hard (i)	(United States) Chase Buchanan	(United States) Mitchell Krueger (United States) Eric Quigley	6–4, 4–6, [19–17]
Win	11–6	Oct 2017	Lima, Peru	Challenger	Clay	(Mexico) Miguel Ángel Reyes-Varela	(Portugal) Gonçalo Oliveira (Poland) Grzegorz Panfil	7–5, 6–3
Loss	11–7	Jun 2018	Caltanissetta, Italy	Challenger	Clay	(Czech Republic) Jiří Veselý	(Italy) Federico Gaio (Italy) Andrea Pellegrino	6–7^{(4–7)}, 6–7^{(5–7)}
Win	12–7	Nov 2019	Charlottesville, USA	Challenger	Hard	(United States) Mitchell Krueger	(United States) Sekou Bangoura (Slovenia) Blaz Kavcic	6–4, 6–1
Win	13–7	Mar 2021	Zadar, Croatia	Challenger	Clay	(Slovenia) Blaž Kavčič	(Slovakia) Lukáš Klein (Slovakia) Alex Molčan	2–6, 6–2, [10–3]
Win	14–7	Nov 2021	Knoxville, USA	Challenger	Hard (i)	(Tunisia) Malek Jaziri	(Mexico) Hans Hach Verdugo (Mexico) Miguel Ángel Reyes-Varela	3–6, 6–3, [10–5]
Loss	14–8	Jan 2022	Bendigo, Australia	Challenger	Hard	(France) Enzo Couacaud	(Belgium) Ruben Bemelmans (Germany) Daniel Masur	6–7^{(2–7)}, 4–6
Win	15–8	Sep 2023	Tulln an der Donau, Austria	Challenger	Clay	(Czech Republic) Zdenek Kolar	(Poland) Piotr Matuszewski (Germany) Kai Wehnelt	6–4, 4–6, [10–6]

== Singles performance timeline ==
Key
W	F	SF	QF	#R	RR	Q#	P#	DNQ	A	Z#	PO	G	S	B	NMS	NTI	P	NH

(W) winner; (F) finalist; (SF) semifinalist; (QF) quarterfinalist; (#R) rounds 4, 3, 2, 1; (RR) round-robin stage; (Q#) qualification round; (P#) preliminary round; (DNQ) did not qualify; (A) absent; (Z#) Davis/Fed Cup Zonal Group (with number indication) or (PO) play-off; (G) gold, (S) silver or (B) bronze Olympic/Paralympic medal; (NMS) not a Masters tournament; (NTI) not a Tier I tournament; (P) postponed; (NH) not held; (SR) strike rate (events won / competed); (W–L) win–loss record.
To avoid confusion and double counting, these charts are updated at the conclusion of a tournament or when the player's participation has ended.

Tournament	2008	2009	2010	2011	2012	2013	2014	2015	2016	2017	2018	2019	2020	2021	2022	W–L
Grand Slam tournaments
Australian Open	A	A	A	A	A	A	2R	1R	Q1	A	Q1	Q2	Q1	Q2	Q1	1–2
French Open	A	A	A	A	A	A	Q3	Q2	Q1	Q1	Q1	1R	Q1	Q2		0–1
Wimbledon	A	A	A	A	A	A	2R	1R	A	A	Q2	Q1	NH	Q1		1–2
US Open	A	A	A	A	A	A	1R	Q1	Q1	Q2	Q1	Q1	A	Q3		0–1
Win–loss	0–0	0–0	0–0	0–0	0–0	0–0	2–3	0–2	0–0	0–0	0–0	0–1	0–0	0–0	0–0	2–6
ATP World Tour Masters 1000
Monte-Carlo Masters	A	A	A	A	A	A	A	Q1	A	A	A	A	NH	A		0–0
Italian Open	A	A	A	A	A	A	Q2	A	A	A	A	A	A	A		0–0
Canadian Open	A	A	A	A	A	A		Q1	A	A	A	A	NH	A		0–0
Cincinnati Masters	A	A	A	A	A	A	1R	Q1	A	A	A	A	A	A		0–1
Win–loss	0–0	0–0	0–0	0–0	0–0	0–0	0–1	0–0	0–0	0–0	0–0	0–0	0–0	0–0	0–0	0–1
National representation
Davis Cup	A	A	Z2	A	A	Z1	Z1	Z1	Z1	A	Z2	Z2	A	A		6–5
Career statistics
Overall win–loss	0–0	0–0	1–0	0–0	0–0	1–1	5–9	6–6	2–2	0–0	0–1	0–2	0–0	0–1	0–1	15–23
Win %	–	–	100%	–	–	50%	36%	50%	50%	–	0%	0%	–	0%		41%
Year-end ranking	1465	933	423	721	307	201	80	144	255	206	188	145	155	181	1118	–

* As of 26 May 2022

== Record against other players ==
Rola's match record against those who have been ranked in the top 10. Players who have been No. 1 are in boldface

- (Spain) Nicolas Almagro 0–1
- (France) Richard Gasquet 0–1
- (United Kingdom) **Andy Murray 0–1**
- (Spain) Fernando Verdasco 0–1

* As of 26 May 2021.

== Davis Cup ==
Group membership World Group (0–0) Group I (7–4) Group II (2–3) Group III (0–0) Group IV (0–0)	Matches by surface Hard (4–2) Clay (5–5) Grass (0–0) Carpet (0–0)	Matches by Location Outdoor (5–3) Indoor (4–4)	Matches by Type Singles (6–4) Doubles (3–3)

- ▲ ▼ indicates the outcome of the Davis Cup match followed by the score, date, place of event, the zonal classification and its phase, and the court surface.

Davis Cup results
Rubber outcome	No.	Rubber	Match type (partner if any)	Opponent nation	Opponent player(s)	Score
▲5–0; 9–11 July 2010; TK Krka Otočec, Otočec, Slovenia; Europe/Africa Group II Second Round; Clay
Victory	1.	IV (dead rubber)	Singles	Bulgaria	Valentin Dimov	6–0, 6–1
▲4–1; 13–15 Sep 2013; Park Tivoli, Ljubljana, Slovenia; Europe/Africa Group I First Round Play-Off; Clay
Victory	2.	I	Singles	South Africa	Rik de Voest	6–1, 6–1, 6–4
Victory	3.	III	Doubles (with Blaž Kavčič)	South Africa	Raven Klaasen / Nicolaas Scholtz	7–5, 6–1, 7–6^{(7–4)}
Defeat	4.	V (dead rubber)	Singles	South Africa	Nicolaas Scholtz	3–2 ret.
▼1–3; 4–6 Apr 2014; ŠRC Marina Portorož, Portorož, Slovenia; Europe/Africa Group I Second Round; Clay
Victory	5.	II	Singles	Israel	Dudi Sela	6–3, 6–4, 6–4
Defeat	6.	III	Doubles (with Grega Žemlja)	Israel	Jonathan Erlich / Andy Ram	6–7^{(7–9)}, 6–4, 6–7^{(5–7)}, 3–6
▲5–0; 30 Oct – 1 Nov 2015; Teniski klub Triglav Kranj, Kranj, Slovenia; Europe/Africa Group I Second Round Play-Off; Hard (i)
Victory	7.	II	Singles	Lithuania	Laurynas Grigelis	7–6^{(8–6)}, 6–2, 6–2
Victory	8.	III	Doubles (with Blaž Kavčič)	Lithuania	Laurynas Grigelis / Lukas Mugevičius	6–4, 7–6^{(7–1)}, 6–4
Victory	9.	IV (dead rubber)	Singles	Lithuania	Lukas Mugevičius	6–2, 6–2
▼1–4; 4–6 Mar 2016; Sala Sporturilor, Arad, Romania; Europe/Africa Group I First Round; Hard (i)
Defeat	10.	I	Singles	Romania	Marius Copil	5–7, 3–6, 6–7^{(5–7)}
Defeat	11.	III	Doubles (with Grega Žemlja)	Romania	Florin Mergea / Horia Tecău	3–6, 6–7^{(5–7)}, 6–7^{(3–7)}
Defeat	12.	II	Singles	Romania	Adrian Ungur	6–3, 6–4
▼2–3; 3–4 Feb 2018; Lukna Sports Hall, Maribor, Slovenia; Europe/Africa Group II First Round; Hard (i)
Victory	13.	II	Singles	Poland	Kamil Majchrzak	4–6, 2–6
Defeat	14.	III	Doubles (with Aljaž Bedene)	Poland	Mateusz Kowalczyk / Marcin Matkowski	7–5, 6–7^{(5–7)}, 4–6
▲3–1; 13–14 Sep 2019; Gezira Sporting Club, Cairo, Egypt; Europe/Africa Group I First Round; Clay
Defeat	15.	II	Singles	Egypt	Mohamed Safwat	4–6, 6–1, 6–7^{(4–7)}
Victory	16.	III	Doubles (with Aljaž Bedene)	Egypt	Sherif Sabry / Mohamed Safwat	7–5, 6–3
