= Teja Belak =

Slovenian artistic gymnast

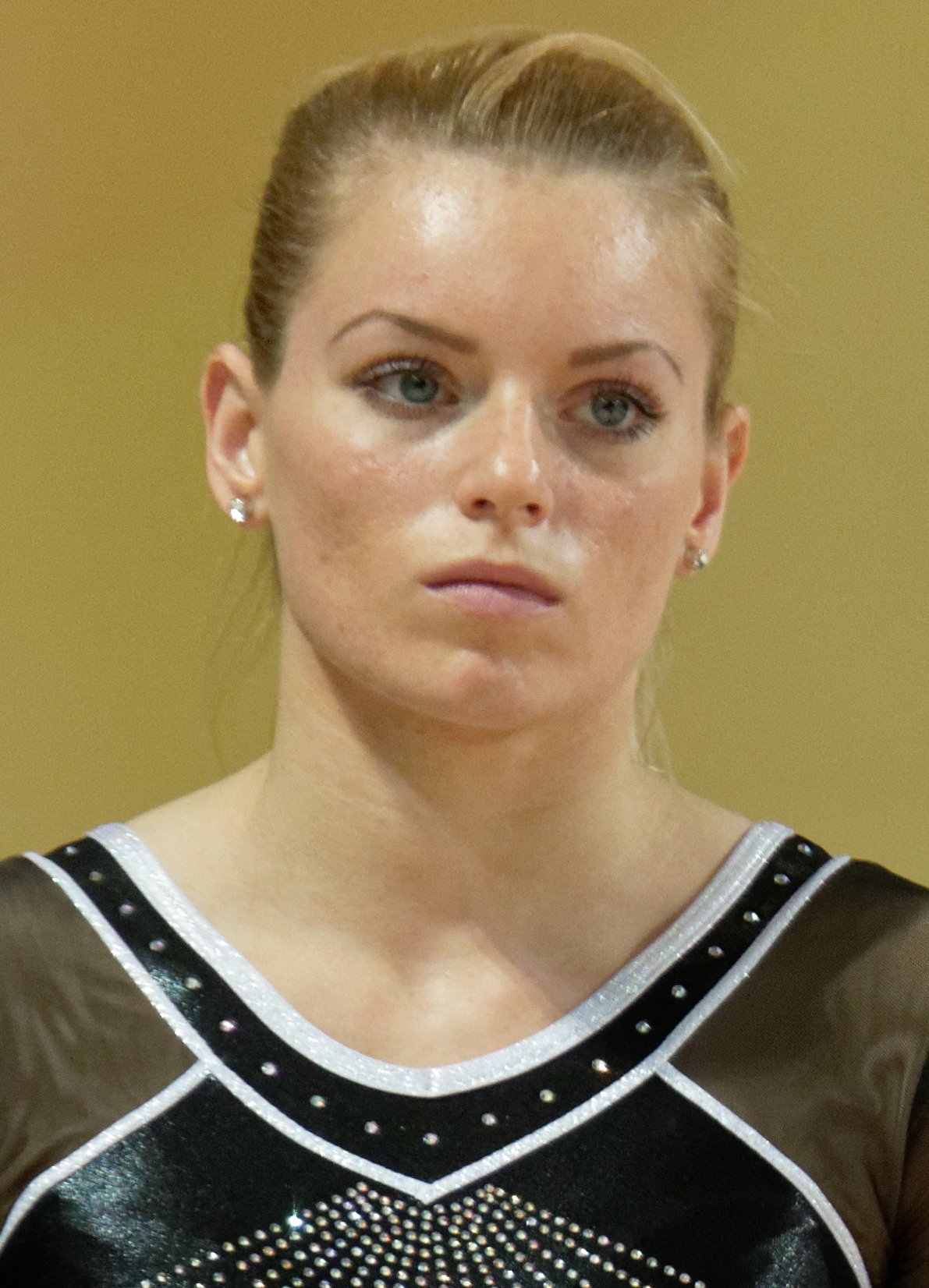
- Belak in 2015

Personal information
- Born: April 22, 1994 (age 32) Ljubljana, Slovenia

Gymnastics career
- Discipline: Women's artistic gymnastics
- Country represented: Slovenia (2010–present)
- Club: GD Zelena Jama
- Head coach: Andrej Mavric
Medal record
Representing Slovenia
Women's artistic gymnastics
Event / 1st / 2nd / 3rd; FIG World Cup / 10 / 17 / 14
European Games
Gold medal – first place	2019 Minsk	Vault
Mediterranean Games
Bronze medal – third place	2018 Tarragona	Vault
Bronze medal – third place	2026 Taranto	Vault

Teja Belak (born 22 April 1994) is a Slovenian artistic gymnast. She represented Slovenia at the 2016 Olympic Games and is the 2019 European Games champion on vault. She primarily competes on the FIG World Cup circuit.

== Early life ==
Belak was born 22 April 1994 in Ljubljana. She lived across the street from a gym and took up the sport when she was six years old.

== Gymnastics career ==
=== 2010–12 ===
Belak turned senior in 2010; as a result she started competing on the FIG World Cup circuit primarily as a vault specialist. She made her senior debut at the Cottbus World Cup where she finished sixth. She next competed in Doha where she finished fifth. She made her first podium by winning gold at the Maribor World Cup held in her home country of Slovenia. Next she competed at the Moscow World Cup where she finished sixth. In October Belak competed at the Ostrava World Cup where she finished fourth. The following month she competed in Osijek where she finished seventh. She ended the season competing in Stuttgart but she failed to qualify to the vault final when she finished 13th in qualification.

In 2011, Belak did not compete for the first half of the year. She returned to competition in September at the Maribor World Cup where she placed second on vault behind Valeria Maksyuta of Israel. She next competed at the Osijek World Cup where she placed sixth. She ended the season competing at the Ostrava World Cup where she once again won silver behind Maksyuta.

In 2012, Belak made her debut at the Doha World Cup where she won bronze on vault behind Giulia Steingruber of Switzerland and Nadine Jarosch of Germany. Next she competed at the Osijek Grand Prix where she failed to qualify to the vault final but placed fourth on balance beam. In May Belak competed at the 2012 European Championships where she finished 11th on vault during qualifications and was the third reserve for the final. In June she competed at the Maribor World Cup she won her second World Cup gold medal on vault and additionally won bronze on the balance beam. At the Ghent World Cup she finished seventh on vault. In November, Belak competed at the Ostrava World Cup where she finished eighth on vault.

=== 2013–14 ===
2013 was a breakout year for Belak as she competed in numerous high-profile international events beyond the World Cup series. In March she competed at the World Cups in Cottbus and Doha, placing fifth on vault and sixth on balance beam in Doha. In April Belak competed at the 2013 European Championships where she qualified to the vault final and finished in fourth place, finishing .300 points behind the two silver medalists Larisa Iordache and Noël van Klaveren. The following week she competed at the Ljubljana World Cup in her hometown; she finished eighth on both vault and balance beam.

In June Belak competed at the 2013 Mediterranean Games in Mersin. Although she qualified to the vault final in second place, she ended up placing sixth. Additionally she helped Slovenia finish sixth as a team. The following month she competed at the Summer Universiade where she finished seventh on vault and helped Slovenia finish 11th as a team. In October Belak represented Slovenia at the World Championships in Antwerp. During qualifications she finished 11th on vault and was the third reserve for the vault final.

Belak began the 2014 season competing at the Cottbus World Cup. During qualifications she finished 18th on vault and 9th on balance beam. Next she competed at the Doha World Cup where she won silver on vault behind Larisa Iordache. The following month she competed at the Osijek World Cup where she won the bronze on vault. Belak next competed at the European Championships. During qualifications she placed 15th on vault and 35th on balance beam and therefore did not qualify for any event finals. She ended the season competing at the Anadia World Cup where she won gold on vault and silver on balance beam.

=== 2015 ===
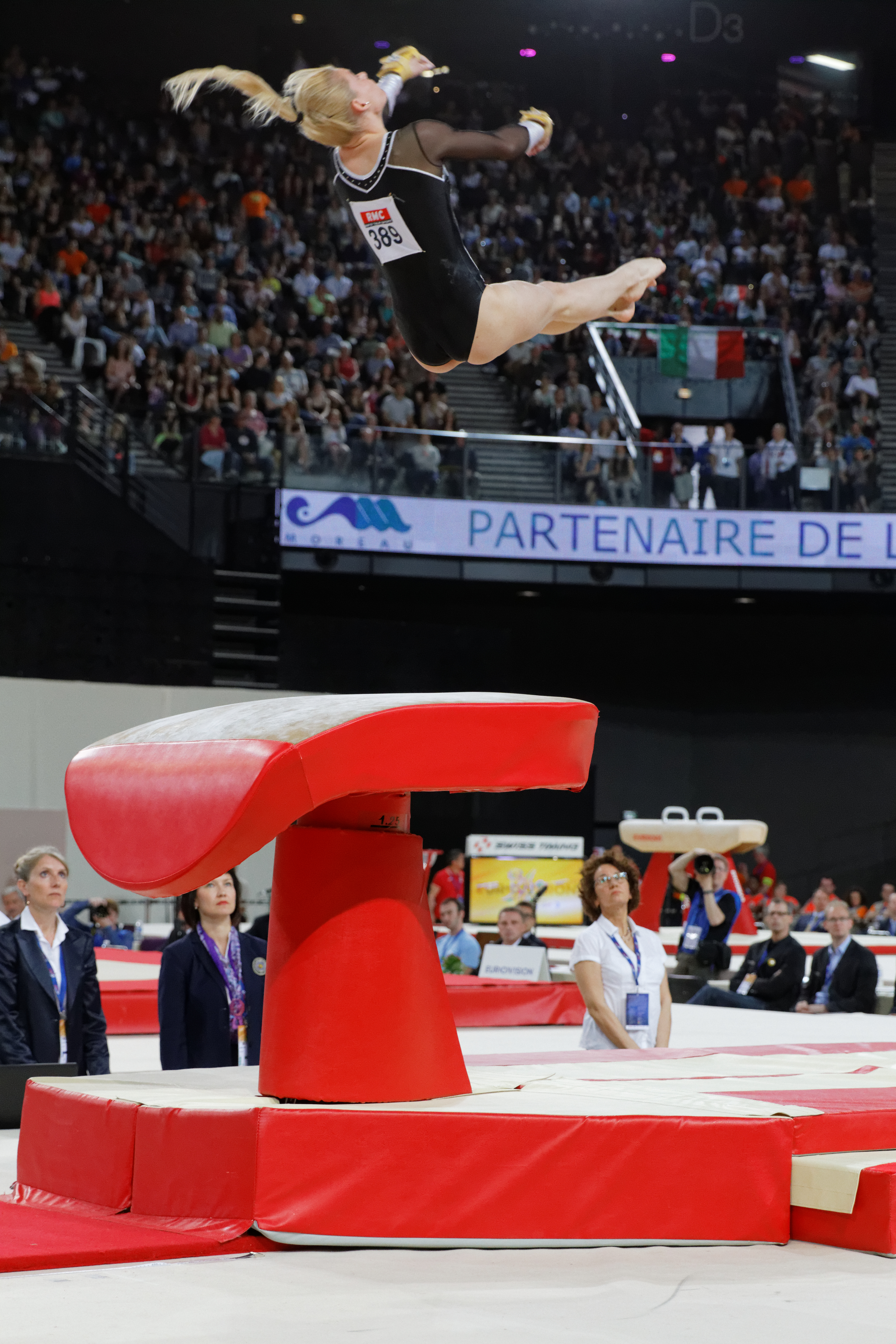
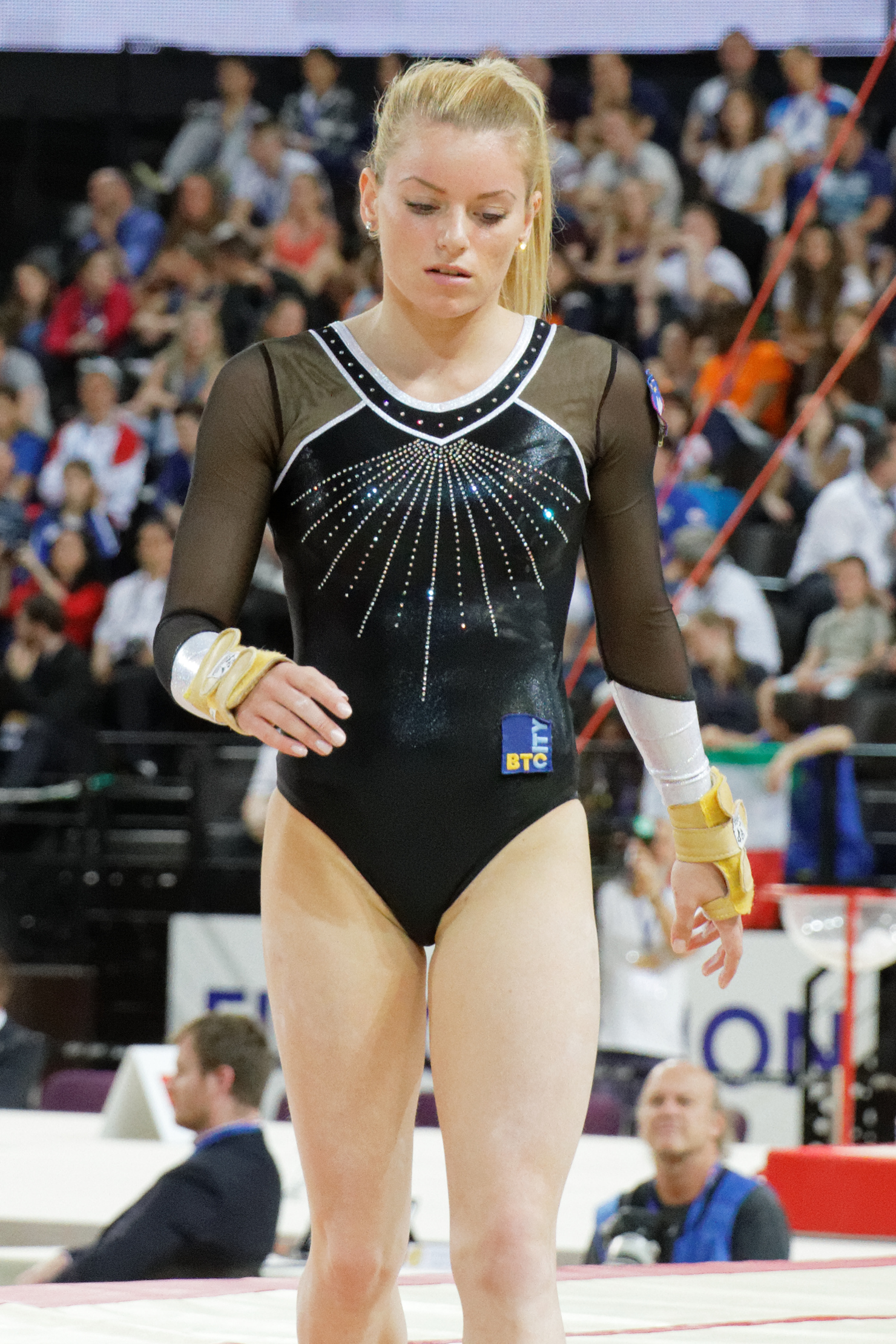
Belak at the 2015 European Championships

Belak began the season competing at the Cottbus World Cup where she won the bronze medal on vault behind Oksana Chusovitina and compatriot Tjaša Kysselef. Additionally she finished eighth on uneven bars. The following week she competed in Doha where she once again won the bronze medal on vault. Continuing on the series she next competed in her hometown of Ljubljana where she won the silver medal on vault behind Chusovitina.

Belak competed at the European Championships where she qualified to the vault final in seventh place and placed 32nd on uneven bars. During event finals she finished eighth on vault.

After the European Championships Belak continued competing at the World Cup series. She won the silver medal on vault at the Varna World Cup, once again behind Chusovitina. Afterwards she competed in Anadia where she placed sixth on vault and eighth on uneven bars. In September she competed at the Osijek World Cup where she finished eighth on both vault and uneven bars. Later that month she competed at the Hungarian Grand Prix where she finished second in the all-around. As for event finals she won silver on vault behind Boglárka Dévai, bronze on uneven bars, and placed fifth on balance beam.

In October Belak represented Slovenia at the World Championships in Glasgow. She placed 58th in the all-around during qualifications and 15th on vault; she did not qualify for any individual event finals.

=== 2016 ===
Belak began the season competing at the Doha World Cup where she won silver on vault behind Giulia Steingruber. She next competed in Cottbus where she placed seventh on vault and eighth on balance beam. Next she competed in Ljubljana and won silver on vault, bronze on uneven bars, place fourth on balance beam, and seventh on floor exercise.

In April Belak was selected to represent Slovenia at the Olympic Test Event. She finished 52nd in the all-around and qualified as an individual to the 2016 Olympic Games in Rio de Janeiro. In May Belak competed at the Varna Challenge Cup where she finished eighth on uneven bars. In June she competed at the European Championships; she finished sixth on vault.

Belak finished the season competing at the 2016 Olympic Games. During qualifications she only competed on vault where she finished 19th and did not qualify to the vault event final.

=== 2017–18 ===
Belak competed at the 2017 World Cups Baku and Doha, earning bronze on vault at both. In April she competed at the European Championships where she placed seventh on vault. She spent the remainder of the season competing in the World Cup series, earning bronze medals in Koper and Varna and finished eighth in Osijek.

Belak began the 2018 season once again competing at the World Cups in Baku and Doha, finishing sixth and eighth on vault respectively. In June Belak competed at the Mediterranean Games. She helped Slovenia finish sixth in the team final. Individually she won the bronze medal on vault and placed seventh on balance beam. In August Belak competed at the European Championships where she finished eighth on vault. In early October she competed at the Leverkusen Cup in Germany where she helped Slovenia win gold as a team; she posted the second highest score on balance beam.

Belak was selected to represent Slovenia at the 2018 World Championships in Doha, Qatar. She finished 16th on vault and did not qualify to the event final. Belak ended the season competing at the Cottbus World Cup, which was the first World Cup event to be used to accumulate points towards qualification to the 2020 Olympic Games. While there Belak finished eighth on vault.

=== 2019 ===
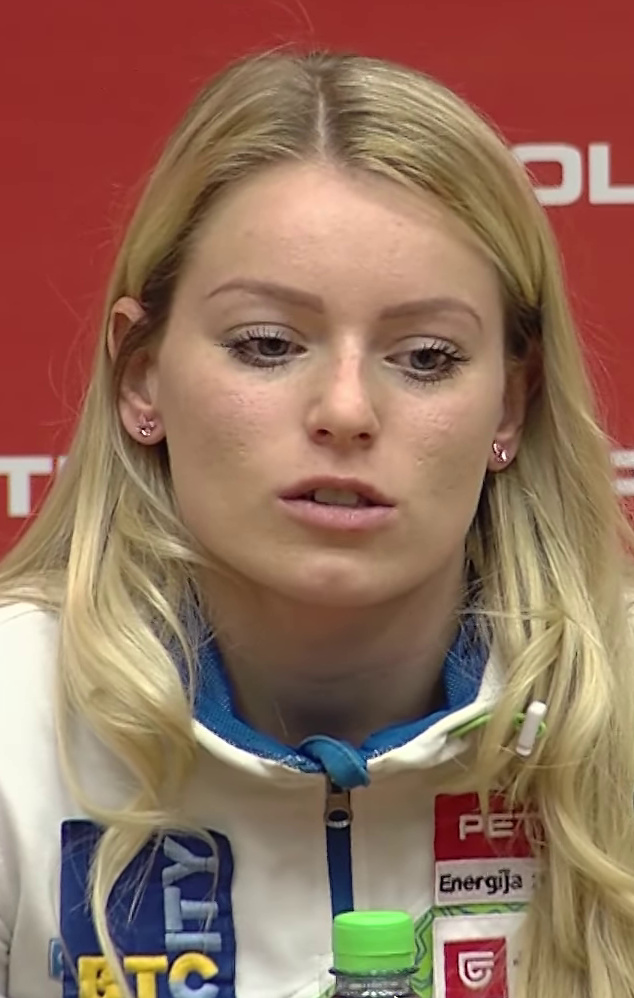
Belak in 2019

Belak began the season competing at the Baku and Doha World Cups but did not qualify for any event finals. In April she competed at the European Championships and qualified to the vault final in second place. However, during the final she fell on her double twisting yurchenko and finished in eighth place. She next competed at the Osijek and Koper Challenge Cups where she won gold and silver on vault respectively.

In June Belak represented Slovenia at the European Games. While there she won the gold medal on vault, finishing ahead of Angelina Melnikova of Russia. In August and September Belak competed at the Mersin and Szombathely Challenge Cups, winning gold on vault and silver on balance beam in Mersin and winning silver on both vault and balance beam in Szombathely.

In October Belak competed at the World Championships in Stuttgart. During qualifications she finished 15th on vault and did not qualify for the event final. The all-around competition was used as Olympic qualification for individuals; Belak placed 144th and did not qualify to the 2020 Olympic Games. She ended the season competing at the Cottbus World Cup where she finished second on vault behind Yu Linmin of China.

=== 2020–21 ===
Belak competed at the 2020 Melbourne World Cup where she placed seventh on vault. She next competed at the Baku World Cup, qualifying to the vault final in first place. However event finals were canceled due to the COVID-19 pandemic in Azerbaijan. The FIG later ruled that the results of qualification would be used for point distribution for Olympic qualification.

On May 31, 2021 Belak and her partner, fellow Slovenian gymnast Žiga Šilc, welcomed a son.

=== 2022–24 ===
Belak returned to competition in March where she competed at the 2022 Cairo World Cup, less than a year after giving birth. She was the first reserve on balance beam but received a 0 on her first vault and did not qualify for the final. Belak next competed at the Baku World Cup where she qualified to the vault final in second place. During the event final she won bronze behind Oksana Chusovitina and Csenge Bácskay. At the Osijek Challenge Cup she won silver on vault behind Valentina Georgieva. In October Belak won gold on vault at the Mersin Challenge Cup. She ended the season competing at the 2022 World Championships where she finished 15th on vault during qualifications.

In the summer of 2023 Belak gave birth to her second child. She intended to compete at the 2024 European Championships less than eight months after giving birth. However she suffered a foot injury which kept her from competing for the rest of the season.

=== 2025 ===
Belak returned to competition in 2025, competing at numerous World Cups. She won gold in Cottbus, sharing a podium with compatriot Tjaša Kysselef and fellow mother Oksana Chusovitina. This podium garnered significant media attention due to the fact that the ages of three medallists equalled 110. Additionally she won silver in Baku behind Chusovitina and won another gold in Doha.

== Competitive history ==
Competitive history of Teja Belak
Year	Event	Team	AA	VT	UB	BB	FX
2010	Cottbus World Cup			6			
2010	Doha World Cup			5			
2010	Maribor World Cup			1st place, gold medalist(s)			
2010	Moscow World Cup			6			
2010	Ostrava World Cup			4			
2010	Osijek World Cup			7			
2011	Maribor World Cup			2nd place, silver medalist(s)			
2011	Osijek World Cup			6			
2011	Ostrava World Cup			2nd place, silver medalist(s)			
2012	Doha World Cup			3rd place, bronze medalist(s)			
2012	Osijek World Cup					4	
2012	European Championships			R3			
2012	Maribor World Cup			1st place, gold medalist(s)		3rd place, bronze medalist(s)	
2012	Ghent World Cup			7			
2012	Ostrava World Cup			8			
2013	Cottbus World Cup			R3			
2013	Doha World Cup			5		6	
2013	European Championships			4			
2013	Ljubljana World Cup			8		8	
2013	Mediterranean Games	6		6			
2013	Summer Universiade	11		7			
2013	World Championships			R3			
2014	Cottbus World Cup					R1	
2014	Doha World Cup			2nd place, silver medalist(s)			
2014	Osijek World Cup			3rd place, bronze medalist(s)			
2014	Anadia World Cup			1st place, gold medalist(s)		2nd place, silver medalist(s)	
2015	Cottbus World Cup			3rd place, bronze medalist(s)	8		
2015	Doha World Cup			3rd place, bronze medalist(s)			
2015	Ljubljana World Cup			2nd place, silver medalist(s)	8		
2015	European Championships			8			
2015	Varna World Cup			2nd place, silver medalist(s)			
2015	Anadia World Cup			6	8		
2015	Osijek World Cup			8	8		
2015	Hungarian Grand Prix		2nd place, silver medalist(s)	2nd place, silver medalist(s)	3rd place, bronze medalist(s)	5	
2016	Doha World Cup			2nd place, silver medalist(s)			
2016	Cottbus Challenge Cup			7		8	
2016	Ljubljana Challenge Cup			2nd place, silver medalist(s)	3rd place, bronze medalist(s)	4	7
2016	Olympic Test Event		52				
2016	Varna Challenge Cup				8		
2016	Olympic Games			19			
2017	Baku World Cup			3rd place, bronze medalist(s)			
2017	Doha World Cup			3rd place, bronze medalist(s)			
2017	European Championships			7			
2017	Koper Challenge Cup			3rd place, bronze medalist(s)			
2017	Osijek Challenge Cup			8			
2017	Varna Challenge Cup			3rd place, bronze medalist(s)			
2017	Szombathely Challenge Cup			R2			
2018	Baku World Cup			6			
2018	Doha World Cup			8			
2018	Mediterranean Games	6		3rd place, bronze medalist(s)		7	
2018	European Championships			8			
2018	Leverkusen Cup	1st place, gold medalist(s)					
2018	Cottbus World Cup			8			
2019
2019	European Championships			8			
2019	Osijek Challenge Cup			1st place, gold medalist(s)			
2019	Koper Challenge Cup			2nd place, silver medalist(s)			
2019	European Games			1st place, gold medalist(s)			
2019	Mersin Challenge Cup			1st place, gold medalist(s)	7	2nd place, silver medalist(s)	
2019	Szombathely Challenge Cup			2nd place, silver medalist(s)		2nd place, silver medalist(s)	
2019	Cottbus World Cup			2nd place, silver medalist(s)			
2020	Melbourne World Cup			7			
2020	Baku World Cup			1			
2022	Cairo World Cup					R1	
2022	Baku World Cup			3rd place, bronze medalist(s)			
2022	Osijek Challenge Cup			2nd place, silver medalist(s)			
2022	Koper Challenge Cup			3rd place, bronze medalist(s)			
2022	Mediterranean Games	7					
2022	Szombathely Challenge Cup			2nd place, silver medalist(s)			
2022	Mersin Challenge Cup			1st place, gold medalist(s)			
2022	World Championships			15			
2025	Cottbus World Cup			1st place, gold medalist(s)			
2025	Baku World Cup			2nd place, silver medalist(s)			
2025	Osijek World Cup			7			
2025	Doha World Cup			1st place, gold medalist(s)			
2025	Koper World Challenge Cup			1st place, gold medalist(s)			
2025	European Championships			4			
2026	Cottbus World Cup			3rd place, bronze medalist(s)			
2026	Antalya World Cup			2nd place, silver medalist(s)			
2026	Cairo World Cup			4			
2026	Osijek World Cup			8			
2026	Koper World Challenge Cup			1st place, gold medalist(s)			
2026	European Championships			22			
2026	Mediterranean Games			3rd place, bronze medalist(s)			
