= Petra Nareks =

Slovenian judoka (born 1982)

Personal information
- Nationality: Slovenian
- Born: 27 September 1982 (age 43)
- Occupation: Judoka

Sport
- Country: Slovenia
- Sport: Judo
- Weight class: –52 kg

Achievements and titles
- Olympic Games: R32 (2004)
- World Champ.: 9th (2005)
- European Champ.: (silver) (2003)
Medal record
Women's judo
Representing Slovenia
European Championships
| Silver medal – second place | 2003 Düsseldorf | –52 kg |
| Bronze medal – third place | 2002 Maribor | –52 kg |
| Bronze medal – third place | 2004 Bucharest | –52 kg |
| Bronze medal – third place | 2005 Rotterdam | –52 kg |
| Bronze medal – third place | 2007 Belgrade | –52 kg |
| Bronze medal – third place | 2008 Lisbon | –52 kg |
IJF Grand Slam
| Silver medal – second place | 2009 Tokyo | –52 kg |
| Bronze medal – third place | 2014 Baku | –52 kg |
IJF Grand Prix
| Bronze medal – third place | 2009 Hamburg | –52 kg |
| Bronze medal – third place | 2014 Budapest | –52 kg |
| Bronze medal – third place | 2017 Tashkent | –52 kg |
European Junior Championships
| Bronze medal – third place | 1998 Bucharest | –52 kg |
| Bronze medal – third place | 2000 Nicosia | –52 kg |
| Bronze medal – third place | 2001 Budapest | –52 kg |
Mediterranean Games
| Silver medal – second place | 2013 Mersin | –52 kg |
| Bronze medal – third place | 2001 Tunis | –52 kg |
| Bronze medal – third place | 2005 Almeria | –52 kg |
| Bronze medal – third place | 2009 Pescara | –52 kg |

Profile at external databases
- IJF: 266
- JudoInside.com: 611
- Updated on 16 November 2022

Petra Nareks (born 27 September 1982) is a Slovene judoka from the city of Celje. She is a six times medalist in the European Championships in the under 52 kg category. Nareks also competed at the 2004 Summer Olympics.

== Achievements ==
=== European Championships ===
- 3rd – Maribor (2002)
- 2nd – Düsseldorf (2003)
- 3rd – Bucharest (2004)
- 5th – Rotterdam (2005)
- 3rd – Tampere (2006)
- 3rd – Belgrade (2007))
- 3rd – Lisbon (2008)
