= Mira Boumejmajen =

French artistic gymnast

- Born: June 6, 1995 (age 31) Vierzon, Cher, France
- Height: 1.53 m (5 ft 0 in)

Gymnastics career
- Discipline: Women's artistic gymnastics
- Country represented: France
- Club: Elan Gymnique Rouen
- Head coach: Eric Demay
- Assistant coach: Cecil Demay
- Choreographer: Monique Hagard
Medal record
Representing France
Mediterranean Games
Silver medal – second place	2013 Mersin	Team

Mira Boumejmajen (born June 6, 1995) is a French artistic gymnast. She competed at the 2012 Summer Olympics.
