= Vlora Beđeti =

Slovenian judoka (born 1991)

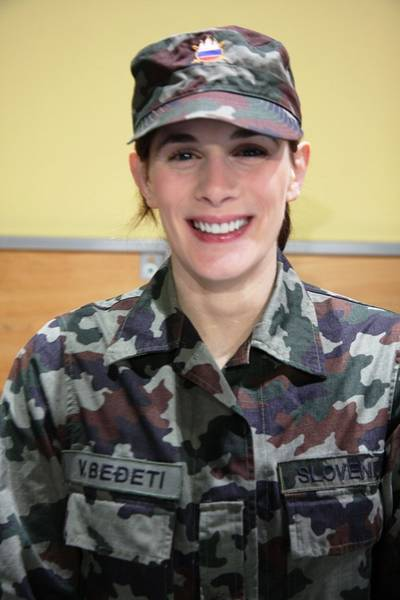

Personal information
- Born: 22 October 1991 (age 34)
- Occupation: Judoka

Sport
- Country: Slovenia
- Sport: Judo
- Weight class: ‍–‍57 kg, ‍–‍63 kg

Achievements and titles
- World Champ.: (bronze) (2013)
- European Champ.: (bronze) (2010)
Medal record
Women's judo
Representing Slovenia
World Championships
Bronze medal – third place	2013 Rio de Janeiro	‍–‍57 kg
European Championships
Bronze medal – third place	2010 Vienna	‍–‍63 kg
IJF Grand Slam
Silver medal – second place	2014 Baku	‍–‍57 kg
IJF Grand Prix
Silver medal – second place	2015 Tbilisi	‍–‍57 kg
Bronze medal – third place	2014 Budapest	‍–‍57 kg
Bronze medal – third place	2014 Jeju	‍–‍57 kg
World Juniors Championships
Silver medal – second place	2010 Agadir	‍–‍63 kg
Bronze medal – third place	2009 Paris	‍–‍63 kg
Mediterranean Games
Gold medal – first place	2013 Mersin	‍–‍57 kg

Profile at external databases
- IJF: 1337
- JudoInside.com: 63467
- Updated on 10 July 2023

Vlora Beđeti (born 22 October 1991) is a Slovenian judoka

Vlora Beđeti won bronze medals at the 2013 World Championships in Rio de Janeiro and the 2010 European Championships in Vienna, and a gold medal at the 2013 Mediterranean Games in Mersin . In 2013, she received the Bloudek Plaque "for significant international achievement in sports".
