= Elisabetta Preziosa =

Italian artistic gymnast

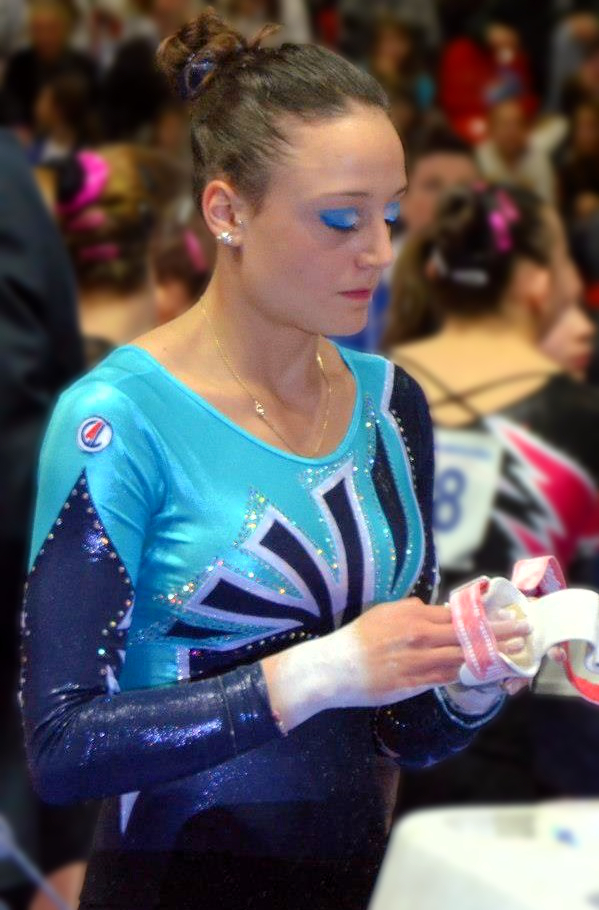

Personal information
- Born: September 21, 1993 (age 32) Tradate, Italy
- Height: 1.55 m (5 ft 1 in)

Gymnastics career
- Discipline: Women's artistic gymnastics
- Country represented: Italy
- Club: Gal Lissone
- Head coaches: Claudia Ferré and Paolo Bucci
- Choreographer: Tiziana di Pilato
- Music: Tango (2010), Prelude (2011), The Piano Duet (2012)
- Eponymous skills: stand on one leg with foot of free leg in forward hold above head for two seconds (balance beam) one and a half (540) pirouette with free leg held at 180 split (balance beam)
Medal record
Representing Italy
European Championships
Bronze medal – third place	2011 Berlin	Balance Beam
Mediterranean Games
Gold medal – first place	2009 Pescara	Floor Exercise
Gold medal – first place	2013 Mersin	Team
Silver medal – second place	2009 Pescara	Team
Silver medal – second place	2009 Pescara	All-Around
Bronze medal – third place	2009 Pescara	Balance Beam
Bronze medal – third place	2013 Mersin	Floor Exercise
European Youth Olympic Festival
Silver medal – second place	2007 Belgrade	Balance beam

Elisabetta Preziosa (born 21 September 1993) is a former artistic gymnast from Italy. She represented her country at the 2012 Summer Olympics.

== Junior career ==
=== 2008 ===
In April, Preziosa competed at the European Championships in Clermont-Ferrand, France. She contributed an all-around score of 54.825 toward the Italian team's fifth-place finish.

In May, Preziosa competed in the senior division of the Italian Championships in Arezzo. She placed fourth in the all-around with a score of 56.000. In event finals, she placed first on balance beam, scoring 15.325, and fourth on floor, scoring 13.950.

== Senior career ==
=== 2009 ===
At the end of June, Preziosa competed at the Mediterranean Games in Pescara, Italy. She contributed an all-around score of 55.050 toward the Italian team's second-place finish. In the all-around final, she placed second with a score of 56.450. In event finals, she placed third on balance beam, scoring 14.450, and first on floor, scoring 14.175.

In March, Preziosa competed at the City of Jesolo Trophy in Jesolo, Italy. She contributed an all-around score of 51.600 toward the Italian team's first-place finish.

In October, Preziosa competed at the World Championships in London. She placed fifth in the balance beam final with a score of 14.200.

=== 2010 ===
In March, Preziosa competed at the City of Jesolo Trophy. She contributed an all-around score of 55.150 toward the Italian team's third-place finish.

At the end of April, Preziosa competed at the European Championships in Birmingham. She contributed an all-around score of 52.300 toward the Italian team's fifth-place finish. In event finals, she placed sixth on balance beam with a score of 13.075.

In October, Preziosa competed at the World Championships in Rotterdam. In the team final, she contributed scores of 13.933 on vault and 14.000 on balance beam toward the Italian team's eighth-place finish. In the all-around final, she placed twenty-fourth with a score of 52.933.

=== 2011 ===
In April, Preziosa competed at the European Championships in Berlin. In qualifications, she placed nineteenth all-around with a score of 52.825 but did not move on to the final because of the two-per-country rule. In event finals, she placed third on the balance beam with a score of 14.325.

In October, Preziosa competed at the World Championships in Tokyo. She contributed scores of 14.208 on balance beam and 13.308 on floor toward the Italian team's ninth-place finish.

=== 2012 ===
In January, Preziosa competed at the London Prepares series in London. She contributed scores of 14.100 on balance beam and 13.466 on floor toward the Italian team's first-place finish, which meant that they qualified a full team to the Olympics.

In June, Preziosa competed at the Italian Championships in Catania. She placed eighth in the all-around competition with a score of 51.600 and third in the floor final with a score of 13.300.

==== London Olympics ====
At the end of July, Preziosa competed at the 2012 Summer Olympics in London. In qualification, she scored 13.733 on vault, 13.266 on balance beam, and 13.300 on floor to help the Italians qualify for the team final. In the team final, she contributed a balance beam score of 12.833 toward the Italian team's seventh-place finish.

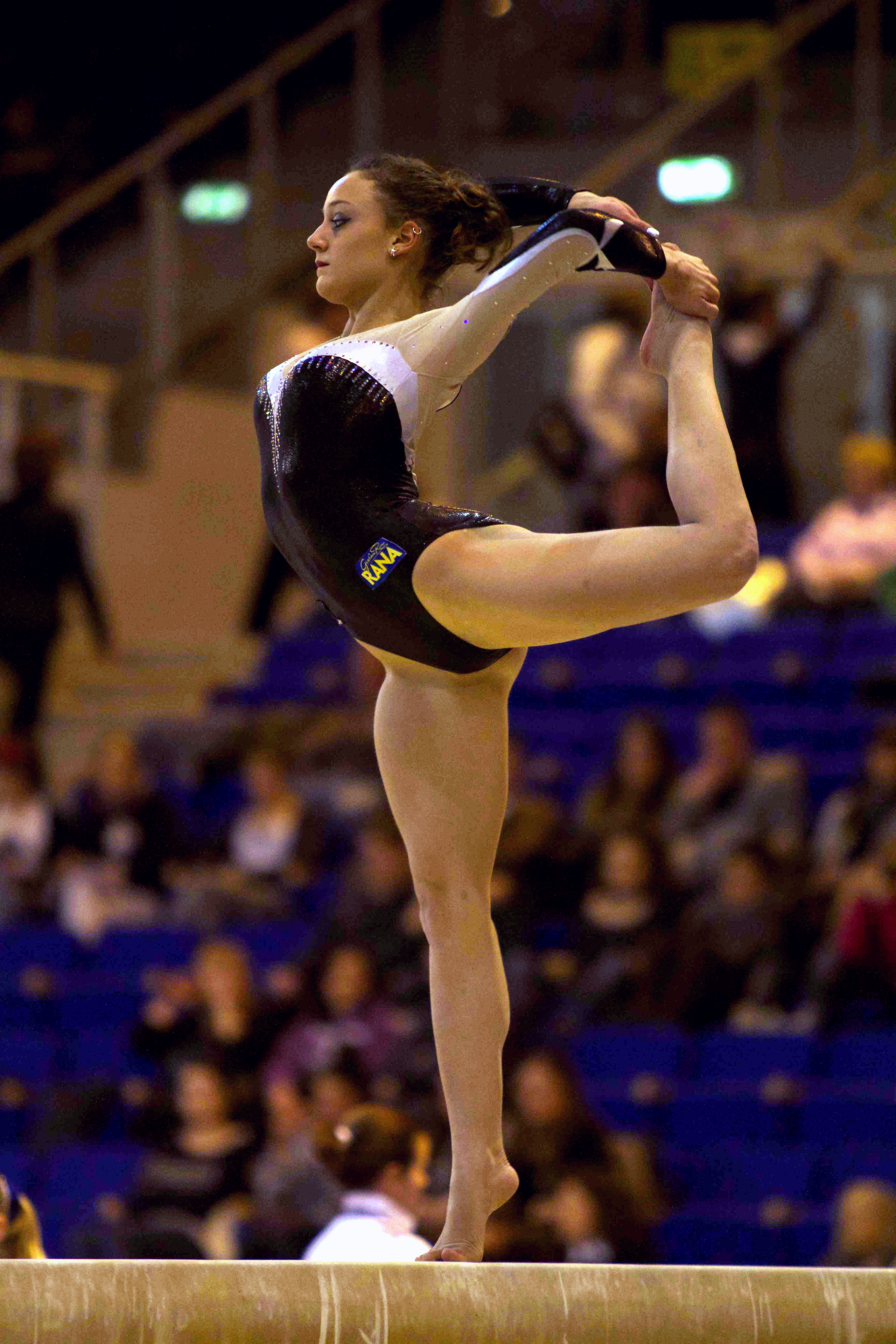
Preziosa performing her eponymous Preziosa skill at the 2013 City of Jesolo Trophy

=== 2013 ===
Preziosa competed at the 2013 City of Jesolo Trophy, where she was part of the Italian team that won silver. She also won an individual bronze medal on the balance beam.

In June, she competed at the 2013 Mediterranean Games. She won a gold team medal and an individual bronze on floor exercise.

=== 2014 ===
Preziosa competed in three Italian Serie A competitions, but due to a knee injury, she was not able to compete at the Italian Championships. Although she initially announced her intention to continue training, she officially retired in early 2015.

== Personal life ==
Preziosa is a star of the reality television series Ginnaste - Vite Parallele on MTV Italy, which follows the lives of seven elite gymnasts who train in Milan.

== Eponymous skill ==
Preziosa has one eponymous skill listed in the Code of Points.

Apparatus	Name	Description	Difficulty (Note: Valid for the 2025–2028 Code of Points)	Added to the Code of Points
Balance beam	Preziosa	1/1 turn (360°) pirouette with free leg held backwards with both hands	D (0.4)	2011 World Championships
