= Demet Mutlu =

Turkish tech entrepreneur (born 1981)

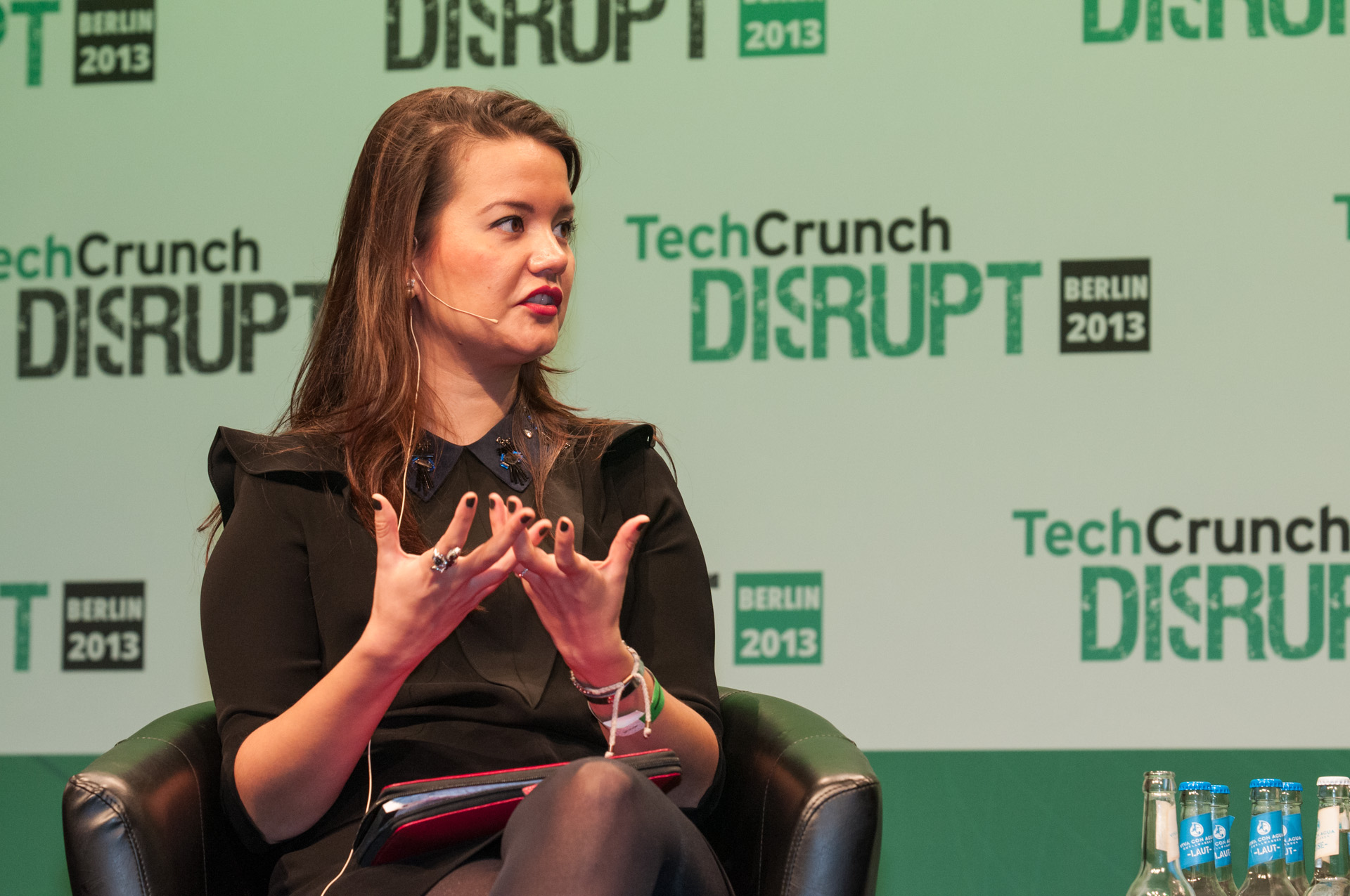
- Born: 22 August 1981 (age 45)
- Education: New York University; Harvard Business School (dropped out)
- Occupations: CEO and founder of Trendyol group

Demet Mutlu (born 22 August 1981) is a Turkish entrepreneur. She is the founder and CEO of Trendyol, an e-commerce operating in Turkey and Europe. She left Harvard Business School in 2010 and founded Trendyol. She is also an investor and co-founder of Peak Games, and one of the largest companies in the global mobile gaming industry which was acquired by Zynga for $1.8 billion.

== Education and career ==
Demet Mutlu graduated cum laude from New York University with a degree in Economics. After working for a number of companies in marketing and business development in Switzerland, Japan, America and Turkey, Demet Mutlu started her MBA at Harvard Business School in 2009.

During a visit to Turkey during the summer after her first year at Harvard Business School, Demet Mutlu saw there was a gap in the field of e-commerce, especially in fashion, and left Harvard Business School to found Trendyol in 2010.

Trendyol has taken an important step to reach consumers in Europe and launched the en.trendyol.com website for the users of 27 countries in Europe. Trendyol is an online marketplace that enables local merchants to sell online through the platform. This model enables Trendyol to promote Turkish manufacturers and brands around the world.

Trendyol has launched new businesses in line with demands from consumers such as Trendyol Express (logistics), Trendyol Go & Food (instant grocery and meal delivery), Trendyol Wallet (e-wallet) and Dolap (second-hand fashion marketplace)

== Accomplishments ==
In 2011, she was named one of the “10 Most Powerful Women Entrepreneurs in the World” by Fortune magazine. In 2011, she was selected as a Global Shaper by the World Economic Forum and she became a founding member of the Global Shapers in Turkey. In 2012 she attended the Davos Summit.

In 2013, she was the only Turk on the BOF 500 – a list prepared by "Business of Fashion", which includes 500 names that lead today's fashion world.

In 2015, she was named one of Europe's 50 Most Inspiring Women in technology.

In 2016 she was the only leader nominated from Turkey who got selected to the Young Global Leaders list of the World Economic Forum. Trendyol was defined as "the world's most exclusive private social network". In 2016, she was cited by The Hundert and Forbes magazines as a model for European women entrepreneurs. In 2016, she was cited by The Hundert and Forbes magazines as a model for European women entrepreneurs.

In 2017, she became the representative for Turkey of the “Inspiring Women” project of the world-famous lifestyle platform Refinery29.

In 2019, she was named ‘Woman Entrepreneur of the Year’ at the Business People of the Year Awards by Ekonomist magazine.
