= Tanja Šmid =

Slovenian swimmer

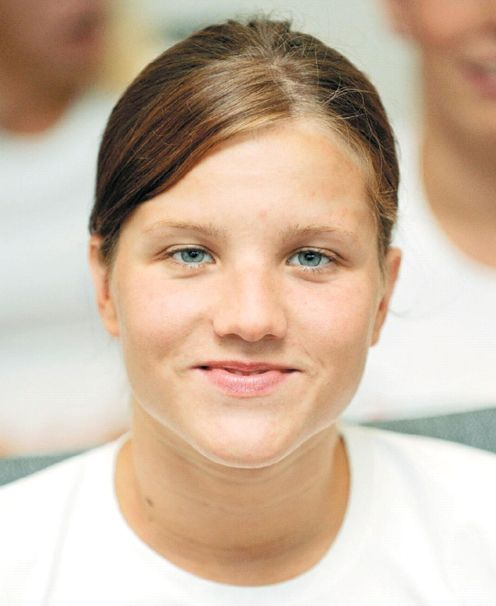
- Šmid in 2012

Personal information
- Born: 29 April 1990 (age 36) Kranj, Slovenia
Medal record
Women's swimming
Representing Slovenia
European Championships (SC)
Silver medal – second place	2010 Eindhoven	200 m breaststroke
Mediterranean Games
Bronze medal – third place	2013 Mersin	4x200 m freestyle

Tanja Šmid (born 29 April 1990 in Kranj) is a Slovenian swimmer. At the 2012 Summer Olympics, she competed in the women's 200 metre breaststroke, finishing in 33rd place overall in the heats, failing to qualify for the semifinals.

In April 2016, Smid was issued with a four-year ban backdated to March 2015 for an anti-doping rule violation after testing positive for GW 1516. She announced her retirement after the decision.
