= María Paula Vargas =

Spanish artistic gymnast

Maria Paula Vargas
- Born: 13 October 1995 (age 30) Valencia, Spain

Gymnastics career
- Discipline: Women's artistic gymnastics
- Country represented: Spain (2015)
Medal record
Women's artistic gymnastics
Representing Spain
Mediterranean Games
Silver medal – second place	2013 Mersin	All-around
Silver medal – second place	2013 Mersin	Uneven bars
Youth Olympic Games
Silver medal – second place	2010 Singapore	Vault

Maria Paula Vargas (born 13 October 1995) is a Spanish female artistic gymnast and part of the national team.

She participated at the 2015 World Artistic Gymnastics Championships in Glasgow, and the 2012 Summer Olympics.
