= Tomislav Ternar =

Slovenian tennis player (born 1990)

- Country (sports): Slovenia
- Residence: Beltinci, Slovenia
- Born: September 16, 1990 (age 35) Murska Sobota, Slovenia
- Plays: Right-handed (two-handed backhand)
- Prize money: $38,994

Singles
- Career record: 1–3
- Highest ranking: No. 575 (16 May 2016)

Doubles
- Career record: 0–0
- Highest ranking: No. 541 (27 August 2012)
Medal record
Mediterranean Games
Gold medal – first place	2013 Mersin	Men's doubles

Tomislav Ternar (born 16 September 1990 in Murska Sobota) is a Slovenian tennis player.

== Davis Cup ==
=== Singles performances (1-0) ===
Edition	Round	Date	Against	Surface	Opponent	Result	Outcome
2013 Europe/Africa Zone Group I	1R	02-03-2013	Poland	Hard (I)	Mariusz Fyrstenberg	4-6, 7–5, 7-5	Win
