= Mezitli Sports Hall =

Arena in Mersin, Turkey

- Mezitli Spor Salonu (Turkish)
- Interactive map of Mezitli Sports Hall
- Location: Mezitli, Mersin, Turkey
- Coordinates: 36°45′15″N 34°32′02″E
- Capacity: 1,500

Construction
- Opened: 1990; 36 years ago

The Mezitli Sports Hall (Turkish: Mezitli Spor Salonu) is a multi-sport indoor arena located in the Mezitli district of Mersin Province, Turkey. It was opened in 1990.

The venue with a seating capacity of 1,500 is suitable for badminton, basketball, boxing, martial arts, volleyball and wrestling events.

Mezitli Sports Hall was used for training activities in judo at the 2013 Mediterranean Games between June 21 and 24.
