= Judo at the 2013 Mediterranean Games =

Judo Judo at the 2013 Mediterranean Games
- Venue: Mersin Gymnastics Hall
- Location: Yenişehir, Mersin, Turkey
- Dates: 20–30 June

Competition at external databases
- Links: JudoInside

The judo competitions at the 2013 Mediterranean Games in Mersin took place between 21 June and 23 June at the Mersin University Hall.

Athletes competed in 14 weight categories.

== Medal summary ==
=== Men's events ===
| Event | Gold | Silver | Bronze |
|---|---|---|---|
| Extra-lightweight (60 kg) | Yassine Moudatir; Morocco | Ahmet Sahin Kaba; Turkey | Ziade Damien; Lebanon |
| Extra-lightweight (60 kg) | Yassine Moudatir; Morocco | Ahmet Sahin Kaba; Turkey | Fabio Basile; Italy |
| Half-lightweight (66 kg) | Sugoi Uriarte; Spain | Andraž Jereb; Slovenia | Nikola Gušić; Montenegro |
| Half-lightweight (66 kg) | Sugoi Uriarte; Spain | Andraž Jereb; Slovenia | Houcem Khalfaoui; Tunisia |
| Lightweight (73 kg) | Hasan Vanlıoğlu; Turkey | Ljubiša Kovačević; Serbia | Jonathan Allardon; France |
| Lightweight (73 kg) | Hasan Vanlıoğlu; Turkey | Ljubiša Kovačević; Serbia | Enrico Parlati; Italy |
| Half-middleweight (81 kg) | Srđan Mrvaljević; Montenegro | Aljaž Sedej; Slovenia | Massimiliano Carollo; Italy |
| Half-middleweight (81 kg) | Srđan Mrvaljević; Montenegro | Aljaž Sedej; Slovenia | Tomislav Marijanović; Croatia |
| Middleweight (90 kg) | Aleksandar Kukolj; Serbia | Walter Facente; Italy | Axel Clerget; France |
| Middleweight (90 kg) | Aleksandar Kukolj; Serbia | Walter Facente; Italy | Abderahmane Benamadi; Algeria |
| Half-heavyweight (100 kg) | Ramadan Darwish; Egypt | Amel Mekić; Bosnia and Herzegovina | Feyyaz Yazıcı; Turkey |
| Half-heavyweight (100 kg) | Ramadan Darwish; Egypt | Amel Mekić; Bosnia and Herzegovina | Vincenzo d'Arco; Italy |
| Heavyweight (+100 kg) | Matjaž Ceraj; Slovenia | Jean-Sebastien Bonvoisin; France | Bilal Zouani; Algeria |
| Heavyweight (+100 kg) | Matjaž Ceraj; Slovenia | Jean-Sebastien Bonvoisin; France | Faical Jaballah; Tunisia |

=== Women's events ===
| Event | Gold | Silver | Bronze |
|---|---|---|---|
| Extra-lightweight (48 kg) | Ebru Şahin; Turkey | Valentina Moscatt; Italy | Hela Ayari; Tunisia |
| Extra-lightweight (48 kg) | Ebru Şahin; Turkey | Valentina Moscatt; Italy | Scarlett Gabrielli; France |
| Half-lightweight (52 kg) | Laura Gómez; Spain | Petra Nareks; Slovenia | Delphine Delsalle; France |
| Half-lightweight (52 kg) | Laura Gómez; Spain | Petra Nareks; Slovenia | Ayşe Saadet Arca; Turkey |
| Lightweight (57 kg) | Vlora Bedeti; Slovenia | Martina Lo Giudice; Italy | Shirley Elliot; France |
| Lightweight (57 kg) | Vlora Bedeti; Slovenia | Martina Lo Giudice; Italy | Fatima Zahra Ait Ali; Morocco |
| Half-middleweight (63 kg) | Marijana Mišković; Croatia | Nina Miloševič; Slovenia | Rizlen Zouak; Morocco |
| Half-middleweight (63 kg) | Marijana Mišković; Croatia | Nina Miloševič; Slovenia | Bahar Buker; Turkey |
| Middleweight (70 kg) | Fanny Estelle Posvite; France | María Bernabéu; Spain | Assmaa Niang; Morocco |
| Middleweight (70 kg) | Fanny Estelle Posvite; France | María Bernabéu; Spain | Anka Pogačnik; Slovenia |
| Half-heavyweight (78 kg) | Géraldine Mentouopou; France | Assunta Galeone; Italy | Kaouther Ouallal; Algeria |
| Half-heavyweight (78 kg) | Géraldine Mentouopou; France | Assunta Galeone; Italy | Vasiliki Lymperopoulou; Greece |
| Heavyweight (+78 kg) | Lucija Polavder; Slovenia | Nihel Chikhrouhou; Tunisia | Belkıs Zehra Kaya; Turkey |
| Heavyweight (+78 kg) | Lucija Polavder; Slovenia | Nihel Chikhrouhou; Tunisia | Larisa Cerić; Bosnia and Herzegovina |

=== Medal table ===
Key:

* Host nation (Turkey)

| Rank | Nation | Gold | Silver | Bronze | Total |
|---|---|---|---|---|---|
| 1 | Slovenia | 3 | 4 | 1 | 8 |
| 2 | France | 2 | 1 | 5 | 8 |
| 3 | Turkey* | 2 | 1 | 4 | 7 |
| 4 | Spain | 2 | 1 | 0 | 3 |
| 5 | Serbia | 1 | 1 | 0 | 2 |
| 6 | Morocco | 1 | 0 | 3 | 4 |
| 7 | Croatia | 1 | 0 | 1 | 2 |
| 7 | Montenegro | 1 | 0 | 1 | 2 |
| 9 | Egypt | 1 | 0 | 0 | 1 |
| 10 | Italy | 0 | 4 | 4 | 8 |
| 11 | Tunisia | 0 | 1 | 3 | 4 |
| 12 | Bosnia and Herzegovina | 0 | 1 | 1 | 2 |
| 13 | Algeria | 0 | 0 | 3 | 3 |
| 14 | Greece | 0 | 0 | 1 | 1 |
| 14 | Lebanon | 0 | 0 | 1 | 1 |
| Totals (15 entries) | | 14 | 14 | 28 | 56 |
