= Rowing at the 2012 Summer Olympics – Qualification =

The majority of qualification places for rowing at the 2012 Summer Olympics were awarded based on results at the 2011 World Championships, held at Lake Bled, Bled, Slovenia, in August and September 2011. Those places were awarded to National Olympic Committees, not the specific athletes. Further berths were allocated at three continental qualifying regattas in Africa, Asia and Latin America (heavyweight single and lightweight double sculls only) and a final Olympic qualification regatta in Lucerne, Switzerland.

== Qualification timeline ==
Event	Date	Venue
2011 World Rowing Championships	28 August – 4 September 2011	(Slovenia) Bled
African Continental Qualification Regatta	1–3 November 2011	(Egypt) Alexandria
Latin America Continental Qualification Regatta	22–25 March 2012	(Argentina) Buenos Aires
Asian Continental Qualification Regatta	26–29 April 2012	(South Korea) Chungju
Final Qualification Regatta	20–23 May 2012	(Switzerland) Lucerne

== Summary ==
Nation	Men								Women						Crews	Athletes
Nation	M1x	M2-	M2x	M4-	M4x	M8+	LM2x	LM4-	W1x	W2-	W2x	W4x	W8+	LW2x	Crews	Athletes
Algeria									X						1	1
Argentina	X		X				X		X	X				X	6	10
Australia		X	X	X	X	X	X	X	X	X	X	X	X	X	13	47
Azerbaijan	X								X						2	2
Belgium	X														1	1
Belarus				X					X						2	5
Brazil	X								X					X	3	4
Cameroon	X														1	1
Canada		X	X	X		X	X						X	X	7	30
Chile	X														1	1
China	X						X	X	X	X	X	X		X	8	18
Croatia	X				X										2	5
Cuba	X						X		X					X	4	6
Czech Republic	X			X				X	X		X				5	12
Denmark	X						X	X	X					X	5	10
Egypt	X						X							X	3	5
El Salvador	X								X						2	2
Estonia			X		X										2	6
France		X	X		X		X	X							5	14
Germany	X	X	X	X	X	X	X	X	X	X	X	X	X	X	14	48
Great Britain	X	X	X	X	X	X	X	X		X	X	X	X	X	13	47
Greece		X		X			X							X	4	10
Hong Kong	X						X								2	3
Hungary		X					X								2	4
India	X						X								2	3
Iran	X								X						2	2
Ireland									X						1	1
Italy		X	X	X	X		X	X		X					7	20
Japan							X		X					X	3	5
Kazakhstan	X								X						2	2
South Korea	X								X					X	3	4
Lithuania	X		X						X						3	4
Mexico	X								X						2	2
Monaco	X														1	1
Myanmar									X						1	1
Netherlands		X		X		X		X			X		X	X	7	32
Niger	X														1	1
New Zealand	X	X	X	X	X		X		X	X	X	X		X	11	26
Norway	X		X				X								3	5
Paraguay									X						1	1
Peru	X														1	1
Poland	X	X			X	X		X			X	X			7	26
Portugal							X								1	2
Romania				X						X			X		3	15
Russia					X				X						2	5
Serbia		X		X											2	6
Slovenia			X												1	2
South Africa								X		X					2	6
Sweden	X								X						2	2
Switzerland					X			X							2	8
Thailand									X						1	1
Chinese Taipei	X														1	1
Tunisia	X								X						2	2
Ukraine			X		X	X					X	X			5	21
United States	X	X		X	X	X		X	X	X	X	X	X	X	12	44
Uruguay							X								1	2
Vietnam														X	1	2
Zimbabwe	X								X						2	2
Total: 58 NOCs	33	13	13	13	13	8	20	13	28	10	10	8	7	17	206	550

== Single sculls men ==
#	Nation	Qualification tournament	Rower
1	New Zealand	2011 Worlds (gold)	Mahé Drysdale
2	Czech Republic	2011 Worlds (silver)	Ondrej Synek
3	Great Britain	2011 Worlds (bronze)	Alan Campbell
4	Germany	2011 Worlds (4th)	Marcel Hacker
5	Sweden	2011 Worlds (5th)	Lassi Karonen
6	Norway	2011 Worlds (6th)	
7	Lithuania	2011 Worlds (1st in B final)	Mindaugas Griškonis
8	Cuba	2011 Worlds (2nd in B final)	
9	Azerbaijan	2011 Worlds (3rd in B final)	Aleksandr Aleksandrov
10	China	2011 Worlds (4th in B final)	
11	United States	2011 Worlds (5th in B final)	Ken Jurkowski
1	Egypt	African Regatta	
2	Zimbabwe	African Regatta	James Fraser-Mackenzie
3	Cameroon	African Regatta	
4	Tunisia	African Regatta	Aymen Mejri
1	India	Asian Regatta	Sawarn Singh
2	Iran	Asian Regatta	Mohsen Shadi
3	South Korea	Asian Regatta	Kim Dong-Yong
4	Chinese Taipei	Asian Regatta	
5	Kazakhstan	Asian Regatta	Vladislav Yakovlev
6	Hong Kong	Asian Regatta	
1	Mexico	Latin American Regatta	Patrick Loliger
2	Argentina	Latin American Regatta	
3	Peru	Latin American Regatta	
4	Chile	Latin American Regatta	Oscar Vasquez
5	Brazil	Latin American Regatta	Anderson Nocetti
6	El Salvador	Latin American Regatta	Roberto Carlos Lopez
1	Belgium	Final Continental	Tim Maeyens
2	Croatia	Final Continental	Mario Vekic
3	Poland	Final Continental	Michał Słoma
4	Denmark	Final Continental	Henrik Stephansen
1	Niger	Wild Card	Hamadou Djibo Issaka
2	Monaco	Wild Card	

== Pairs men ==
#	Nation	Qualification tournament	Rowers
1	New Zealand	2011 Worlds (gold)	Hamish Bond; Eric Murray
2	Great Britain	2011 Worlds (silver)	George Nash; Will Satch
3	Italy	2011 Worlds (bronze)	Lorenzo Carboncini; Niccolò Mornati
4	Greece	2011 Worlds (4th)	Nikolaos Gkountoulas; Apostolos Gkountoulas
5	Canada	2011 Worlds (5th)	David Calder; Scott Frandsen
6	Germany	2011 Worlds (6th)	Anton Braun; Felix Drahotta
7	Australia	2011 Worlds (1st in B final)	Brodie Buckland; James Marburg
8	Netherlands	2011 Worlds (2nd in B final)	Meindert Klem; Nanne Sluis
9	United States	2011 Worlds (3rd in B final)	Tom Peszek; Silas Stafford
10	Serbia	2011 Worlds (4th in B final)	Nikola Stojić; Jovan Popović
11	Hungary	2011 Worlds (5th in B final)	Adrián Juhász; Béla Simon
1	France	Final Continental	Germain Chardain; Dorian Mortelette
2	Poland	Final Continental	Jarosław Godek; Wojciech Gutorski

== Double sculls men ==
#	Nation	Qualification tournament	Rowers
1	New Zealand	2011 Worlds (gold)	Nathan Cohen; Joseph Sullivan
2	Germany	2011 Worlds (silver)	Eric Knittel; Stephan Krüger
3	France	2011 Worlds (bronze)	Julian Bahain; Cédric Berrest
4	Australia	2011 Worlds (4th)	Scott Brennan; David Crawshay
5	Slovenia	2011 Worlds (5th)	Iztok Čop; Luka Špik
6	Great Britain	2011 Worlds (6th)	Bill Lucas; Sam Townsend
7	Estonia	2011 Worlds (1st in B final)	
8	Norway	2011 Worlds (2nd in B final)	
9	Argentina	2011 Worlds (3rd in B final)	
10	Lithuania	2011 Worlds (4th in B final)	Rolandas Maščinskas; Saulius Ritter
11	Canada	2011 Worlds (5th in B final)	Michael Braithwaite; Kevin Kowalyk
1	Italy	Final Continental	Romano Battisti; Alessio Sartori
2	Ukraine	Final Continental	Dmytro Mikhay; Artem Morozov

== Fours men ==
#	Nation	Qualification tournament	Rowers
1	Great Britain	2011 Worlds (gold)	Alex Gregory; Tom James; Pete Reed; Andrew Triggs Hodge
2	Greece	2011 Worlds (silver)	
3	Australia	2011 Worlds (bronze)	James Chapman; Josh Dunkley-Smith; Drew Ginn; Will Lockwood
4	United States	2011 Worlds (4th)	Charlie Cole; Scott Gault; Glenn Ochal; Henrik Rummel
5	Germany	2011 Worlds (5th)	Gregor Hauffe; Urs Käufer; Toni Seifert; Sebastian-Mathias Schmidt
6	Netherlands	2011 Worlds (6th)	Kaj Hendriks; Ruben Knab; Boaz Meylink; Mechiel Versluis
7	Canada	2011 Worlds (1st in B final)	Will Dean; Anthony Jacob; Derek O'Farrell; Michael Wilkinson
8	New Zealand	2011 Worlds (2nd in B final)	Chris Harris; Sean O'Neill; Jade Uru; Tyson Williams
9	Belarus	2011 Worlds (3rd in B final)	Aliaksandr Kazubouski; Vadzim Lialin; Dzainis Mihal; Stanislau Shcharbachenia
10	Italy	2011 Worlds (4th in B final)	Luca Agamennoni; Daniele Danesin; Francesco Fossi; Mario Paonessa
11	Serbia	2011 Worlds (5th in B final)	Radoje Đerić; Goran Jagar; Miloš Vasić; Miljan Vuković
1	Czech Republic	Final Continental	Milan Bruncvík; Michal Horváth; Matyáš Klang; Jakub Podrazil
2	Romania	Final Continental	Marius-Vasile Cozmiuc; Alexandru Palamariu; Cristi Ilie Pargie; Florin Curuea

== Quadruple sculls men ==
#	Nation	Qualification tournament	Rowers
1	Australia	2011 Worlds (gold)	Karsten Forsterling; James McRae; Chris Morgan; Daniel Noonan
2	Germany	2011 Worlds (silver)	Karl Schulze; Philip Turning; Lauritz Schoof; Tim Grohmann
3	Croatia	2011 Worlds (bronze)	Damir Martin; David Šain; Martin Sinković; Valent Sinković
4	Poland	2011 Worlds (4th)	Michał Jeliński; Marek Kolbowicz; Adam Korol; Konrad Wasielewski
5	Russia	2011 Worlds (5th)	Sergey Fedorovtsev; Nikita Morgachyov; Vladislav Ryabtsev; Igor Salov
6	Italy	2011 Worlds (6th)	Rossano Galtarossa; Paolo Perino; Matteo Stefanini; Simone Venier
7	Great Britain	2011 Worlds (1st in B final)	Charles Cousins; Stephen Rowbotham; Tom Solesbury; Matthew Wells
8	United States	2011 Worlds (2nd in B final)	Peter Graves; Elliot Hovey; Alex Osborne; Wes Piermarini
9	Switzerland	2011 Worlds (3rd in B final)	Augustin Maillefer; Nico Stahlberg; Florian Stofer; André Vonarburg
10	New Zealand	2011 Worlds (4th in B final)	Michael Arms; Robbie Manson; John Storey; Matthew Trott
11	Ukraine	2011 Worlds (5th in B final)	Serhiy Hryn; Oleksandr Nadtoka; Volodymyr Pavlovskiy; Kostiantyn Zaitsev
1	Estonia	Final Continental	Tõnu Endrekson; Andrei Jämsä; Allar Raja; Kaspar Taimsoo
2	France	Final Continental	Matthieu Androdias; Benjamin Chabanet; Adrien Hardy; Pierre-Jean Peltier

== Eights men ==
#	Nation	Qualification tournament	Rowers
1	Germany	2011 Worlds (gold)	
2	Great Britain	2011 Worlds (silver)	
3	Canada	2011 Worlds (bronze)	
4	Australia	2011 Worlds (4th)	
5	Poland	2011 Worlds (5th)	Krystian Aranowski; Marcin Brzeziński; Mikołaj Burda; Rafał Hejmej; Piotr Hojka; Piotr Juszczak; Zbigniew Schodowski; Michał Szpakowski; Daniel Trojanowski (cox)
6	Netherlands	2011 Worlds (6th)	
7	Ukraine	2011 Worlds (1st in B final)	
1	United States	Final Continental	

== Double sculls lightweight men ==
#	Nation	Qualification tournament	Rowers
1	Great Britain	2011 Worlds (gold)	Mark Hunter; Zac Purchase
2	New Zealand	2011 Worlds (silver)	Peter Taylor; Storm Uru
3	Italy	2011 Worlds (bronze)	Lorenzo Bertini; Elia Luini
4	Germany	2011 Worlds (4th)	Linus Lichtschlag; Lars Hartig
5	Denmark	2011 Worlds (5th)	Mads Rasmussen; Rasmus Quist Hansen
6	China	2011 Worlds (6th)	
7	France	2011 Worlds (1st in B final)	Jérémie Azou; Stany Delayre
8	Greece	2011 Worlds (2nd in B final)	
9	Norway	2011 Worlds (3rd in B final)	
10	Portugal	2011 Worlds (4th in B final)	Pedro Fraga; Nuno Mendes
11	Canada	2011 Worlds (5th in B final)	Morgan Jarvis; Douglas Vandor
1	Egypt	African Regatta	
1	Japan	Asian Regatta	
2	Hong Kong	Asian Regatta	
3	India	Asian Regatta	Sandeep Kumar; Manjeet Singh
1	Cuba	Latin American Regatta	
2	Argentina	Latin American Regatta	Mario Cejas; Miguel Mayol
3	Uruguay	Latin American Regatta	
1	Hungary	Final Continental	Zsolt Hirling; Tamás Varga
2	Australia	Final Continental	Rod Chisholm; Tom Gibson

== Fours lightweight men ==
#	Nation	Qualification tournament	Rowers
1	Australia	2011 Worlds (gold)	
2	Italy	2011 Worlds (silver)	
3	Great Britain	2011 Worlds (bronze)	
4	China	2011 Worlds (4th)	
5	Denmark	2011 Worlds (5th)	
6	Switzerland	2011 Worlds (6th)	
7	Poland	2011 Worlds (1st in B final)	Miłosz Bernatajtys; Łukasz Pawłowski; Paweł Rańda; Łukasz Siemion
8	Czech Republic	2011 Worlds (2nd in B final)	
9	Germany	2011 Worlds (3rd in B final)	
10	France	2011 Worlds (4th in B final)	
11	South Africa	2011 Worlds (5th in B final)	
1	United States	Final Continental	
2	Netherlands	Final Continental	

== Single sculls women ==
#	Nation	Qualification tournament	Rowers
1	Czech Republic	2011 Worlds (gold)	
2	Belarus	2011 Worlds (silver)	
3	New Zealand	2011 Worlds (bronze)	
4	China	2011 Worlds (4th)	
5	Sweden	2011 Worlds (5th)	
6	Germany	2011 Worlds (6th)	
7	Azerbaijan	2011 Worlds (1st in B final)	
8	Russia	2011 Worlds (2nd in B final)	
9	Lithuania	2011 Worlds (3rd in B final)	
1	Zimbabwe	African Regatta	
2	Algeria	African Regatta	
3	Tunisia	African Regatta	
1	Japan	Asian Regatta	
2	South Korea	Asian Regatta	
3	Iran	Asian Regatta	
4	Kazakhstan	Asian Regatta	
5	Thailand	Asian Regatta	
1	Cuba	Latin American Regatta	
2	El Salvador	Latin American Regatta	
3	Mexico	Latin American Regatta	
4	Argentina	Latin American Regatta	
5	Brazil	Latin American Regatta	
1	Australia	Final Continental	
2	Denmark	Final Continental	
3	United States	Final Continental	
4	Ireland	Final Continental	
1	Paraguay	Wild Card	
2	Myanmar	Wild Card	

== Pairs women ==
#	Nation	Qualification tournament	Rowers
1	New Zealand	2011 Worlds (gold)	
2	Great Britain	2011 Worlds (silver)	
3	Australia	2011 Worlds (bronze)	
4	China	2011 Worlds (4th)	
5	Romania	2011 Worlds (5th)	
6	South Africa	2011 Worlds (6th)	
7	Italy	2011 Worlds (1st in B final)	
8	United States	2011 Worlds (2nd in B final)	
1	Germany	Final Continental	
2	Argentina	Final Continental	

== Double sculls women ==
#	Nation	Qualification tournament	Rowers
1	Great Britain	2011 Worlds (gold)	
2	Australia	2011 Worlds (silver)	
3	New Zealand	2011 Worlds (bronze)	
4	Ukraine	2011 Worlds (4th)	
5	Poland	2011 Worlds (5th)	Magdalena Fularczyk; Julia Michalska
6	Czech Republic	2011 Worlds (6th)	
7	Germany	2011 Worlds (1st in B final)	
8	China	2011 Worlds (2nd in B final)	
1	United States	Final Continental	
2	Netherlands	Final Continental	

== Quadruple sculls women ==
#	Nation	Qualification tournament	Rowers
1	Germany	2011 Worlds (gold)	
2	United States	2011 Worlds (silver)	
3	New Zealand	2011 Worlds (bronze)	
4	Australia	2011 Worlds (4th)	
5	China	2011 Worlds (5th)	
6	Ukraine	2011 Worlds (6th)	
7	Great Britain	2011 Worlds (1st in B final)	
1	Poland	Final Continental	Joanna Leszczyńska; Sylwia Lewandowska; Natalia Madaj; Kamila Soćko

== Eights women ==
#	Nation	Qualification tournament	Rowers
1	United States	2011 Worlds (gold)	
2	Canada	2011 Worlds (silver)	
3	Great Britain	2011 Worlds (bronze)	
4	Romania	2011 Worlds (4th)	
5	Netherlands	2011 Worlds (5th)	
1	Australia	Final Continental	
2	Germany	Final Continental	

== Double sculls lightweight women ==
#	Nation	Qualification tournament	Rowers
1	Greece	2011 Worlds (gold)	
2	Canada	2011 Worlds (silver)	
3	Great Britain	2011 Worlds (bronze)	
4	United States	2011 Worlds (4th)	
5	Australia	2011 Worlds (5th)	
6	New Zealand	2011 Worlds (6th)	
7	China	2011 Worlds (1st in B final)	
8	Denmark	2011 Worlds (2nd in B final)	
1	Egypt	African Regatta	
1	Japan	Asian Regatta	
2	South Korea	Asian Regatta	
3	Vietnam	Asian Regatta	
1	Argentina	Latin American Regatta	
2	Brazil	Latin American Regatta	
3	Cuba	Latin American Regatta	
1	Germany	Final Continental	
2	Netherlands	Final Continental	

- The Tripartite Commission can issue invitations covering up to 4 rowers.
