= Rowing at the 2012 Summer Olympics – Men's coxless four =

Men's coxless four at the Games of the XXX Olympiad
- Venue: Eton Dorney
- Date: 30 July – 4 August 2012
- Competitors: 52 from 13 nations
- Winning time: 6:03.97

Medalists
1st place, gold medalist(s)		Alex Gregory; Tom James; Pete Reed; Andrew Triggs Hodge	Great Britain
2nd place, silver medalist(s)		James Chapman; Josh Dunkley-Smith; Drew Ginn; Will Lockwood	Australia
3rd place, bronze medalist(s)		Charlie Cole; Scott Gault; Glenn Ochal; Henrik Rummel	United States

The men's coxless four competition at the 2012 Summer Olympics in London took place at Dorney Lake which, for the purposes of the Games venue, is officially termed Eton Dorney.

== Schedule ==
All times are British Summer Time (UTC+1)

Date	Time	Round
Monday, 30 July 2012	10:40	Heats
Tuesday, 31 July 2012	10:00	Repechage
Thursday, 2 August 2012	10:10	Semifinals
Saturday, 4 August 2012	10:30	Final B
Saturday, 4 August 2012	11:30	Final

== Results ==
=== Heats ===
First three of each heat qualify to the semifinals, remainder goes to the repeachge.

==== Heat 1 ====
Rank	Rowers	Country	Time	Notes
1	Chapman, Dunkley-Smith, Ginn, Lockwood	Australia	5:47.06	Q
2	Hauffe, Käufer, Schmidt, Seifert	Germany	5:49.84	Q
3	Dean, Jacob, O'Farrell, Wilkinson	Canada	5:50.78	Q
4	Harris, O'Neill, Uru, Williams	New Zealand	5:51.84	
5	Đerić, Jagar, Vasić, Vuković	Serbia	5:53.35	

==== Heat 2 ====
Rank	Rowers	Country	Time	Notes
1	Gregory, James, Reed, Triggs-Hodge	Great Britain	5:50.27	Q
2	Cozmiuc, Curuea, Palamariu, Pîrghie	Romania	5:52.87	Q
3	Kazubouski, Lialin, Mihal, Shcharbachenia	Belarus	5:53.26	Q
4	Bruncvík, Horváth, Klang, Podrazil	Czech Republic	5:54.37	R

==== Heat 3 ====
Rank	Rowers	Country	Time	Notes
1	Cole, Gault, Ochal, Rummel	United States	5:54.88	Q
2	Hendriks, Knab, Meylink, Versluis	Netherlands	5:55.99	Q
3	Christou, Papachristos, Tsilis, Tziallas	Greece	5:57.71	Q
4	Agamennoni, Capelli, Paonessa, Venier	Italy	6:02.01	R

=== Repechage ===
First three qualify to the semifinals.

Rank	Rowers	Country	Time	Notes
1	Đerić, Jagar, Vasić, Vuković	Serbia	6:01.97	Q
2	Harris, O'Neill, Uru, Williams	New Zealand	6:03.66	Q
3	Agamennoni, Capelli, Paonessa, Venier	Italy	6:04.27	Q
4	Bruncvík, Horváth, Klang, Podrazil	Czech Republic	6:04.56	

=== Semifinals ===
First three qualify to the final, remainder to Final B.

==== Semifinal 1 ====
Rank	Rowers	Country	Time	Notes
1	Gregory, James, Reed, Triggs-Hodge	Great Britain	5:58.26	Q
2	Chapman, Dunkley-Smith, Ginn, Lockwood	Australia	5:59.23	Q
3	Hendriks, Knab, Meylink, Versluis	Netherlands	6:03.71	Q
4	Agamennoni, Capelli, Paonessa, Venier	Italy	6:05.00	
5	Kazubouski, Lialin, Mihal, Shcharbachenia	Belarus	6:05.26	
6	Đerić, Jagar, Vasić, Vuković	Serbia	6:07.41	

==== Semifinal 2 ====
Rank	Rowers	Country	Time	Notes
1	Cole, Gault, Ochal, Rummel	United States	6:01.72	Q
2	Christou, Papachristos, Tsilis, Tziallas	Greece	6:02.61	Q
3	Hauffe, Käufer, Schmidt, Seifert	Germany	6:04.61	Q
4	Harris, O'Neill, Uru, Williams	New Zealand	6:06.36	
5	Dean, Jacob, O'Farrell, Wilkinson	Canada	6:08.90	
6	Cozmiuc, Curuea, Palamariu, Pîrghie	Romania	6:12.74	

=== Finals ===
==== Final B ====
Rank	Canoer	Country	Time	Notes
1	Kazubouski, Lialin, Mihal, Shcharbachenia	Belarus	6:09.31	
2	Agamennoni, Capelli, Paonessa, Venier	Italy	6:09.42	
3	Dean, Jacob, O'Farrell, Wilkinson	Canada	6:11.15	
4	Đerić, Jagar, Vasić, Vuković	Serbia	6:11.94	
5	Harris, O'Neill, Uru, Williams	New Zealand	6:11.97	
6	Cozmiuc, Curuea, Palamariu, Pîrghie	Romania	6:16.20	

==== Final A ====
Rank	Rowers	Country	Time	Notes
1st place, gold medalist(s)	Gregory, James, Reed, Triggs-Hodge	Great Britain	6:03.97	
2nd place, silver medalist(s)	Chapman, Dunkley-Smith, Ginn, Lockwood	Australia	6:05.19	
3rd place, bronze medalist(s)	Cole, Gault, Ochal, Rummel	United States	6:07.20	
4	Christou, Papachristos, Tsilis, Tziallas	Greece	6:11.43	
5	Hendriks, Knab, Meylink, Versluis	Netherlands	6:14.78	
6	Hauffe, Käufer, Schmidt, Seifert	Germany	6:16.37	
