= 2012 European Rowing Championships =

- Location: Varese, Italy
- Dates: 14–16 September 2012

The 2012 European Rowing Championships is the sixth edition of the European Rowing Championships, since they were reinstated by decision of FISA in 2006. The event was held in Varese, Italy, between 14 and 16 September 2012.

== Medal summary ==
=== Men ===
Event	Gold	Time	Silver	Time	Bronze	Time
M1x	Mindaugas Griškonis (LTU)	6:57.56	Damir Martin (CRO)	6:57.63	Georgi Bozhilov (BUL)	6:59.71
LM2x	Greece (GRE); Panagiotis Magdanis; Spyridon Giannaros	6:21.58	Portugal (POR); Pedro Fraga; Nuno Mendes	6:22.27	Great Britain (GBR); Chris Boddy; Michael Mottram	6:23.34
M2x	Croatia (CRO); Martin Sinković; Valent Sinković	6:14.25	Italy (ITA); Alessio Sartori; Romano Battisti	6:15.17	Norway (NOR); Nils Jakob Hoff; Kjetil Borch	6:17.78
M2−	Netherlands (NED); Rogier Blink; Mitchel Steenman	6:28.00	Spain (ESP); Álex Sigurbjörnsson; Pau Vela	6:29.17	Serbia (SRB); Nenad Beđik; Nikola Stojić	6:31.50
LM4−	Italy (ITA); Luca De Maria; Martino Goretti; Petru Zaharia; Armando Dell'Aquila	6:00.92	Great Britain (GBR); Sam Scrimgeour; Adam Freeman-Pask; William Fletcher; Jonathan Clegg	6:01.74	Serbia (SRB); Nikola Selaković; Miloš Stanojević; Nenad Babović; Miloš Tomić	6:05.46
M4−	Greece (GRE); Nikolaos Goudoulas; Apostolos Goudoulas; Georgios Tziallas; Ioannis Christou	5:56.03	Romania (ROU); Marius Cozmiuc; George Palamariu; Cristi Ilie Pîrghie; Florin Curuea	5:57.37	Serbia (SRB); Miloš Vasić; Radoje Đerić; Miljan Vuković; Goran Jagar	5:58.72
M4x	Estonia (EST); Andrei Jämsä; Allar Raja; Tõnu Endrekson; Kaspar Taimsoo	5:47.91	Ukraine (UKR); Yuriy Ivanov; Ivan Futryk; Oleksandr Nadtoka; Ivan Dovhodko	5:51.18	Slovenia (SLO); Gašper Fistravec; Jan Špik; Jernej Markovc; Matej Rojec	5:52.01
M8+	Poland (POL); Marcin Brzeziński; Maciej Mattik; Mikołaj Burda; Piotr Hojka; Zbigniew Schodowski; Michal Szpakowski; Krystian Aranowski; Rafał Hejmej; Daniel Trojanowski	5:33.23	Italy (ITA); Paolo Perino; Giuseppe Vicino; Leopoldo Sansone; Pierpaolo Frattini; Mario Paonessa; Vincenzo Capelli; Sergio Canciani; Andrea Tranquilli; Enrico D'Aniello (cox)	5:34.57	Czech Republic (CZE); Kornel Altman; David Jirka; Jakub Podrazil; Michal Horváth; Jan Pilc; Milan Doleček; Petr Melichar; Matyáš Klang; Martin Šuma	5:35.23

=== Women ===
Event	Gold	Time	Silver	Time	Bronze	Time
W1x	Donata Vištartaitė (LTU)	7:36.26	Iva Obradović (SRB)	7:39.87	Kaisa Pajusalu (EST)	7:41.81
W2−	Romania (ROU); Camelia Lupașcu; Nicoleta Albu	7:14.49	Great Britain (GBR); Caragh McMurtry; Olivia Carnegie-Brown	7:18.65	Croatia (CRO); Sonja Kešerac; Maja Anić	7:18.91
LW2x	Italy (ITA); Laura Milani; Elisabetta Sancassani	6:53.39	Greece (GRE); Christina Giazitzidou; Alexandra Tsiavou	6:57.62	Great Britain (GBR); Ruth Walczak; Imogen Walsh	6:58.87
W2x	Belarus (BLR); Tatsiana Kukhta; Katsiaryna Shliupskaya	6:58.94	Italy (ITA); Giulia Pollini; Giada Colombo	7:02.20	Romania (ROU); Maria Diana Bursuc; Adelina Cojocariu	7:03.67
W4x	Ukraine (UKR); Kateryna Tarasenko; Nataliya Dovgodko; Olha Hurkovska; Yana Dementyeva	6:26.44	Poland (POL); Kamila Socko; Joanna Leszczynska; Sylwia Lewandowska; Natalia Madaj	6:28.42	Romania (ROU); Ionelia Zaharia; Ioana Crăciun; Camelia Lupașcu; Nicoleta Albu	6:29.98
W8+	Romania (ROU); Roxana Cogianu; Viorica Susanu; Cristina Grigoras; Irina Dorneanu; Georgeta Andrunache; Andreea Boghian; Rodica Şerban; Ioana Rotaru; Talida-Teodora Gidoiu	6:06.94	Italy (ITA); Claudia Wurzel; Sara Magnaghi; Alessandra Patelli; Giada Colombo; Gabriella Bascelli; Sara Bertolasi; Gaia Palma; Enrica Marasca; Federica Cesarini	6:17.66	Great Britain (GBR); Leonora Kennedy; Claire Mckeown; Monica Relph; Victoria Meyer-Laker; Yasmin Tredell; Zoe Lee; Caragh McMurtry; Olivia Carnegie-Brown; Zoe de Toledo	6:18.31

== Medal table ==
Rank	Nation	Gold	Silver	Bronze	Total
1	Italy (ITA)	2	4	0	6
2	Romania (ROU)	2	1	2	5
3	Greece (GRE)	2	1	0	3
4	Lithuania (LTU)	2	0	0	2
5	Croatia (CRO)	1	1	1	3
6	Poland (POL)	1	1	0	2
6	Ukraine (UKR)	1	1	0	2
8	Estonia (EST)	1	0	1	2
9	Belarus (BLR)	1	0	0	1
9	Netherlands (NED)	1	0	0	1
11	Great Britain (GBR)	0	2	3	5
12	Serbia (SRB)	0	1	3	4
13	Portugal (POR)	0	1	0	1
13	Spain (ESP)	0	1	0	1
15	Bulgaria (BUL)	0	0	1	1
15	Czech Republic (CZE)	0	0	1	1
15	Norway (NOR)	0	0	1	1
15	Slovenia (SLO)	0	0	1	1
Totals (18 entries)		14	14	14	42
