= 2010 Rowing World Cup – World Cup 1 =

The first event of the 2010 World Rowing Cup took place in Lake Bled, Slovenia from May 28–30.

== Medal summary ==
Event:	Gold:	Time	Silver:	Time	Bronze:	Time
Men's Events
M1x	Czech Republic; Ondřej Synek	6:49.58	Great Britain; Alan Campbell	6:53.76	Germany; Marcel Hacker	6:54.27
M2x	Great Britain 1 Matthew Wells; Marcus Bateman	6:26.66	Great Britain 2 William Lucas; Sam Townsend	6:27.77	Estonia; Allar Raja; Kaspar Taimsoo	6:28.18
M4x	Croatia; Valent Sinković; Damir Martin; Martin Sinković; David Šain	5:51.49	Italy; Simone Raineri; Simone Venier; Alessio Sartori; Matteo Stefanini	5:55.16	Poland; Adam Korol; Michał Jeliński; Marek Kolbowicz; Konrad Wasielewski	5:27.26
M2-	New Zealand; Eric Murray; Hamish Bond	6:33.30	Great Britain; Pete Reed; Andrew Triggs Hodge	6:34.52	Greece; Nikolaos Gkountoulas; Apostolos Gkountoulas	6:41.06
M4-	Great Britain; Richard Egington; Alex Partridge; Alex Gregory; Matt Langridge	6:06.44	Serbia; Radoje Đerić; Miljan Vuković; Goran Jagar; Miloš Vasić	6:08.18	Canada; Rob Gibson; Michael Wilkinson; Fraser Berkhout; Douglas Csima	6:09.04
M8+	Great Britain; Nathaniel Reilly-O'Donnell; James Clarke; James Orme; James Foad; Moe Sbihi; Greg Searle; Pete Reed; Daniel Ritchie; Phelan Hill (cox)	5:36.61	Netherlands; Vincent van der Want; Boaz Meylink; Kaj Hendriks; Jozef Klaassen; Mechiel Versluis; Derk Noordhuis; Olaf van Andel; Diederik Simon; Peter Wiersum (cox)	5:37.74	Poland; Rafał Hejmej; Krystian Aranowski; Michał Szpakowski; Sławomir Kruszkowski; Piotr Hojka; Marcin Brzeziński; Wojciech Gutorski; Mikołaj Burda; Daniel Trojanowski (cox)	5:38.94
LM2x	Canada; Douglas Vandor; Cameron Sylvester	6:27.80	Italy; Lorenzo Bertini; Elia Luini	6:31.87	France; Jérémie Azou; Rémi Di Girolamo	6:33.24
LM4-	Denmark		Great Britain		Italy	
Women's Events
W1x	Belarus; Ekaterina Karsten-Khodotovitch		New Zealand; Emma Twigg		China; Bin Tang	
W2x	Great Britain; Katherine Grainger; Anna Watkins		China 1 Liang Tian; Zhang Yangyang		United States; Stesha Carle; Kathleen Bertko	
W4x	Great Britain; Katherine Grainger; Anna Watkins; Beth Rodford; Annabel Vernon		Ukraine		Switzerland; Regina Naunheim	
W2-	Canada; Ashley Brzozowicz; Krista Guloien	7:20.60	China 1 Li Meng; Li Tong	7:22.81	United States; Erin Cafaro; Susan Francia	7:22.86
W8+	Great Britain		Netherlands		Poland	
LW2x	United States		Great Britain 1		Greece	

== World Cup Standings ==
Rank	Nation	Bled Points
1	Great Britain	75
2	China	31
3	Italy	27
4	Canada	25
5	Netherlands	22
6	United States	21
7	Czech Republic	16
7	Poland	16
9	Germany	14
9	New Zealand	14
