= Canada at the 2012 Summer Olympics =

- IOC code: CAN
- NOC: Canadian Olympic Committee
- Website: www.olympic.ca (in English and French)

in London
- Competitors: 277 in 24 sports
- Flag bearers: Simon Whitfield (opening); Christine Sinclair (closing)
- Medals Ranked 27th: Gold 2 Silver 6 Bronze 10 Total 18

Summer Olympics appearances (overview)
- ~~1900~~; 1904; 1908; 1912; 1920; 1924; 1928; 1932; 1936; 1948; 1952; 1956; 1960; 1964; 1968; 1972; 1976; 1980; 1984; 1988; 1992; 1996; 2000; 2004; 2008; 2012; 2016; 2020; 2024; 2028

Other related appearances
- 1906 Intercalated Games

Canada, represented by the Canadian Olympic Committee (COC), competed at the 2012 Summer Olympics in London, United Kingdom, from 27 July to 12 August 2012. Canadian athletes have competed in every Summer Olympic Games since 1900, except the 1980 Summer Olympics in Moscow because of the country's support for the United States-led boycott. Canada sent a total of 281 athletes to the Games to compete in 24 sports. With the initiation of its "Own the Podium" programme, the COC set a goal of finishing in the top 12 for total medals; but the nation came up short of this goal, finishing 13th in the medal standings. Canada matched its total medal count from Beijing 2008, finishing the event with 18 medals: two gold, six silver and 10 bronze.

Canada left London with a single gold medal, awarded to trampoline gymnast Rosannagh MacLennan in the women's event. This was its lowest count of golds in a Summer Olympic games since 1976. However, weightlifter Christine Girard, initially the bronze medallist in the women's 63 kg event, was subsequently upgraded to the gold medal position in April 2018 following the disqualification of the gold and silver medallists. This raised Canada's gold medal count to two, which still remained the nation's lowest count since 1976, where it failed to win a gold despite being the host.

Prior to Girard's being upgraded to the gold medal, Canada's performance had broken the record for the highest total medal count for a nation with only one gold medal. This was despite several Canadian athletes just missing out of the medal finishes, including the men's 4 x 100 m sprint relay team, who were disqualified after finishing in third. Canada left London with 5 silver and 11 bronze medals. The media nicknamed this the "Bronze Games" for Canada due to the disproportionate number of bronze medals won (compared to the solitary gold medal) compared to previous Olympics. Diving pair Émilie Heymans and Jennifer Abel won the nation's first medal in the women's synchronized springboard event. Heymans became the first Canadian athlete to win Olympic medals in four consecutive games. Canada also won the bronze medal match in the women's soccer tournament, the first for the nation since 1904, and the first in a traditional team sport since 1936.

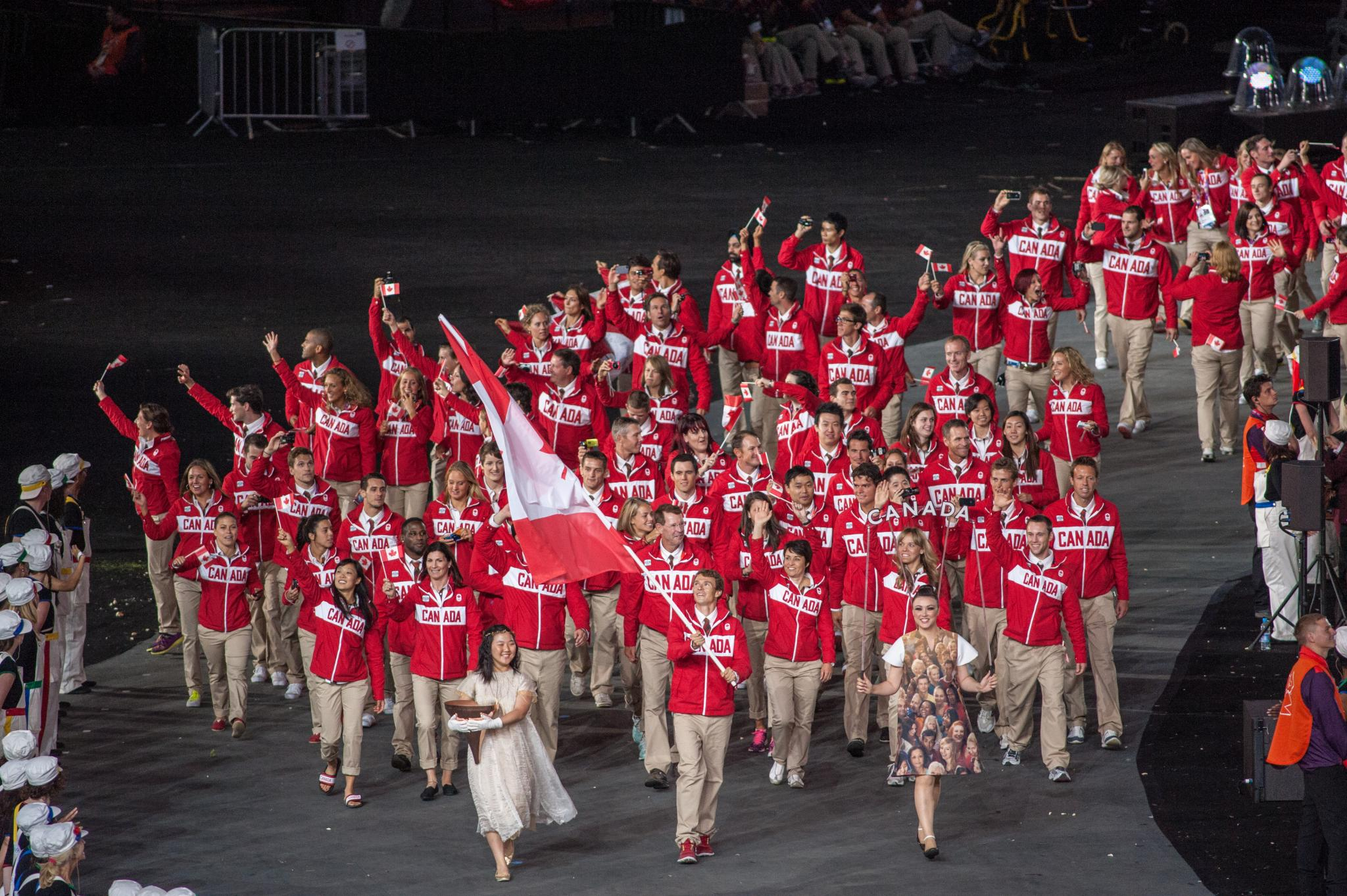
The Canadian team entering the stadium at the opening ceremonies

== Medallists ==
Medal	Name	Sport	Event	Date
Gold	Christine Girard	Weightlifting	Women's 63 kg	31 July
Gold	Rosie MacLennan	Gymnastics	Women's trampoline	4 August
Silver	Gabriel Bergen; Jeremiah Brown; Andrew Byrnes; Will Crothers; Douglas Csima; Robert Gibson; Malcolm Howard; Conlin McCabe; Brian Price	Rowing	Men's eight	1 August
Silver	Ashley Brzozowicz; Janine Hanson; Krista Guloien; Darcy Marquardt; Natalie Mastracci; Andréanne Morin; Lesley Thompson; Rachelle Viinberg; Lauren Wilkinson	Rowing	Women's eight	2 August
Silver	Ryan Cochrane	Swimming	Men's 1500 m freestyle	4 August
Silver	Derek Drouin	Athletics	Men's high jump	7 August
Silver	Adam van Koeverden	Canoeing	Men's K-1 1000 m	8 August
Silver	Tonya Verbeek	Wrestling	Women's freestyle 55 kg	9 August
Bronze	Jennifer Abel; Émilie Heymans	Diving	Women's synchronized 3 m springboard	29 July
Bronze	Meaghan Benfeito; Roseline Filion	Diving	Women's synchronized 10 m platform	31 July
Bronze	Antoine Valois-Fortier	Judo	Men's 81 kg	31 July
Bronze	Brent Hayden	Swimming	Men's 100 m freestyle	1 August
Bronze	Gillian Carleton; Jasmin Glaesser; Tara Whitten	Cycling	Women's team pursuit	4 August
Bronze	Mark Oldershaw	Canoeing	Men's C-1 1000 m	8 August
Bronze	Carol Huynh	Wrestling	Women's freestyle 48 kg	8 August
Bronze	Canada women's national soccer team: Melanie Booth; Candace Chapman; Jonelle Filigno; Robyn Gayle; Kaylyn Kyle; Karina LeBlanc; Diana Matheson; Erin McLeod; Carmelina Moscato; Marie-Ève Nault; Kelly Parker; Sophie Schmidt; Desiree Scott; Lauren Sesselmann; Christine Sinclair (c); Chelsea Stewart; Melissa Tancredi; Brittany Timko; Rhian Wilkinson; Emily Zurrer	Soccer	Women's tournament	9 August
Bronze	Richard Weinberger	Swimming	Men's 10 km open water	10 August
Bronze	Mark de Jonge	Canoeing	Men's K-1 200 m	11 August

Medals by sport
Sport	1st place, gold medalist(s)	2nd place, silver medalist(s)	3rd place, bronze medalist(s)	Total
Gymnastics	1	0	0	1
Weightlifting	1	0	0	1
Rowing	0	2	0	2
Swimming	0	1	2	3
Canoeing	0	1	2	3
Wrestling	0	1	1	2
Athletics	0	1	0	1
Diving	0	0	2	2
Cycling	0	0	1	1
Football	0	0	1	1
Judo	0	0	1	1
Total	2	6	10	18

=== Medal hopes ===
Several Canadian athletes, considered as strong medal contenders, missed out of the podium during their final events. The men's sprint relay team, led by Jared Connaughton, held the third fastest time in the finals, but were later disqualified for a lane violation. Trampoline gymnasts Jason Burnett and Karen Cockburn missed out of winning another Olympic medal for the first time. Triathlete and two-time Olympic medallist Simon Whitfield was forced to withdraw from the men's event after suffering minor injuries from a bike crash. Springboard diver and medal favourite Alexander Despatie made a disappointing performance in the men's final event, finishing only in eleventh place. Track cyclist Tara Whitten finished fourth in a grueling two-day women's omnium event, when she was a former two time world champion in the event. Other medal failures included the female badminton team's defeat in the bronze medal match, defending champion Eric Lamaze, who failed to advance into the finals in the individual jumping event, and fourth-place finishes in swimming, specifically in the women's 4x200 freestyle relay event, and in synchronized swimming.

== Delegation ==
The Canadian Olympic Committee selected a team of 281 athletes, 119 men and 153 women, to compete in all sports except handball and field hockey. The nation's team size was roughly smaller by 60 athletes from the previous games. Along with the nation's athletes, Canada also sent a team of 93 coaches and 137 members from the mission staff. For the second time in its Olympic history, Canada was represented by more female than male athletes. Athletics was the largest team by sport, with a total of 45 competitors.

The Canadian team included several past Olympic champions, three of them defending (freestyle wrestler Carol Huynh, equestrian jumping rider Eric Lamaze, and the men's eight rowing team). Equestrian show jumper Ian Millar became the first athlete to compete at his tenth Olympic games, and also, the oldest athlete of the team at age 65. Eight rower Lesley Thompson, Canada's oldest female athlete, made her seventh Olympic appearance, having participated since 1984 (except the 2004 Summer Olympics in Athens, where she was not selected). Gymnast Victoria Moors, on the other hand, was the youngest athlete of the team, at age 15. Other Canadian athletes featured road cyclist Clara Hughes, who competed at both Summer and Winter Olympic games, two-time silver medallist Alexander Despatie in springboard diving, multiple-time Olympic medallist Adam van Koeverden in sprint kayaking, and swimmers Ryan Cochrane and Brent Hayden.

Former backstroke swimmer and 1992 Summer Olympics gold medallist Mark Tewksbury was the nation's chef de mission, while former diver and 1984 Summer Olympics gold medallist Sylvie Bernier became an assistant chef de mission. Triathlete and double Olympic medallist Simon Whitfield was the nation's flag bearer at the opening ceremony.

The following is the list of number of competitors participating in the Games. Note that reserves in fencing, field hockey, football, and handball are not counted as athletes:

Sport	Men	Women	Total
Archery	1	1	2
Athletics	25	20	45
Badminton	1	3	4
Basketball	0	12	12
Boxing	2	1	3
Canoeing	7	1	8
Cycling	6	10	16
Diving	5	4	9
Equestrian	4	8	12
Fencing	2	3	5
Football	0	18	18
Gymnastics	2	13	15
Judo	5	3	8
Modern pentathlon	0	2	2
Rowing	19	11	30
Sailing	9	2	11
Shooting	1	1	2
Swimming	13	18	31
Synchronized swimming	0	9	9
Table tennis	3	1	4
Taekwondo	2	1	3
Tennis	3	2	5
Triathlon	3	2	5
Volleyball	2	2	4
Weightlifting	0	3	3
Wrestling	5	4	9
Total	120	155	275

== Archery ==
Canada qualified one male and female archer. Jason Lyon won a quota spot by finishing in the top 5 in the men's individual event at the 2011 World Archery Championships in Turin, Italy. However, Crispin Duenas won the right to represent Canada at the Games after winning the Olympic trials. Marie-Pier Beaudet won the continental qualification event and the Canadian trials to qualify for the 2012 Olympics.

Athlete	Event	Ranking round		Round of 64	Round of 32	Round of 16	Quarterfinals	Semifinals	Final / BM	
Athlete	Event	Score	Seed	Opposition Score	Opposition Score	Opposition Score	Opposition Score	Opposition Score	Opposition Score	Rank
Crispin Duenas	Men's individual	678	8	El-Nemr (EGY) (57); L 2–6	Did not advance					
Marie-Pier Beaudet	Women's individual	645	29	Laursen (DEN) (36); L 3–7	Did not advance					

== Athletics ==
Canadian athletes achieved qualifying standards in the following athletics events (up to a maximum of three athletes in each event at the 'A' Standard, and one at the 'B' Standard): The team was selected based on the results of the 2012 Canadian Olympic Track & Field Trials in Calgary on 27–30 June.

Key

- Note–Ranks given for track events are within the athlete's heat only
- Q = Qualified for the next round
- q = Qualified for the next round as a fastest loser or, in field events, by position without achieving the qualifying target
- NR = National record
- N/A = Round not applicable for the event
- Bye = Athlete not required to compete in round

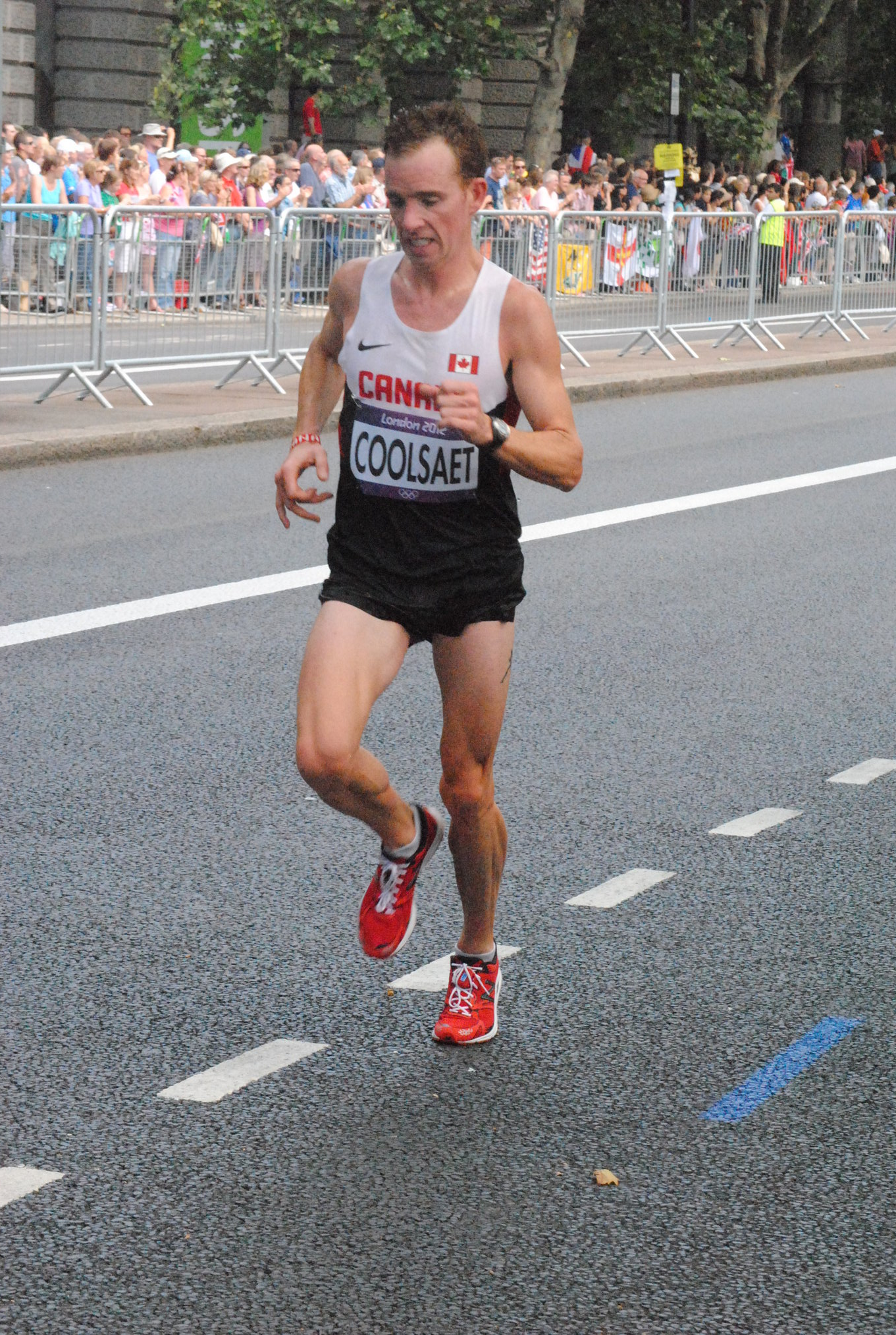
Reid Coolsaet finished twenty-seventh in men's marathon.

Men
Track & road events

Athlete	Event	Heat		Quarterfinal		Semifinal		Final	
Athlete	Event	Result	Rank	Result	Rank	Result	Rank	Result	Rank
Justyn Warner	100 m	Bye		10.09	3 Q	10.09	5	Did not advance	
Aaron Brown	200 m	20.55	4 Q	—N/a		20.42	4	Did not advance	
Jared Connaughton	200 m	20.72	3 Q	—N/a		20.64	7	Did not advance	
Tremaine Harris	200 m	20.70	5	—N/a		Did not advance			
Daundre Barnaby	400 m	46.04	6	—N/a		Did not advance			
Geoffrey Harris	800 m	1:45.97	2 Q	—N/a		1:46.14	7	Did not advance	
Nathan Brannen	1500 m	3:39.95	5 Q	—N/a		3:39.26	12	Did not advance	
Cameron Levins	5000 m	13:18.29	8 q	—N/a				13:51.87	14
Mohammed Ahmed	10000 m	—N/a						28:13.91	18
Cameron Levins	10000 m	—N/a						27:38.81	11
Alex Genest	3000 m steeplechase	8:22.62	7	—N/a				Did not advance	
Jared Connaughton; Akeem Haynes; Oluwasegun Makinde; Gavin Smellie; Oluseyi Smith; Justyn Warner	4 × 100 m relay	38.05	2 Q	—N/a				DSQ*	
Reid Coolsaet	Marathon	—N/a						2:16:29	27
Eric Gillis	Marathon	—N/a						2:16:00	22
Dylan Wykes	Marathon	—N/a						2:15:26	20
Inaki Gomez	20 km walk	—N/a						1:20.58	13

* Canada initially placed third in the 4 × 100 m relay, but were subsequently disqualified for stepping on the lane line.

Field events

Athlete	Event	Qualification		Final	
Athlete	Event	Distance	Position	Distance	Position
Derek Drouin	High jump	2.29	6 q	2.29	2nd place, silver medalist(s)
Michael Mason	High jump	2.26	=12 q	2.29	8
Dylan Armstrong	Shot put	20.49	7 q	20.93	5
Justin Rodhe	Shot put	NM	—	Did not advance	
Curtis Moss	Javelin throw	78.22	22	Did not advance	
James Steacy	Hammer throw	NM	—	Did not advance	

Combined events – Decathlon

Athlete	Event	100 m	LJ	SP	HJ	400 m	110H	DT	PV	JT	1500 m	Final	Rank
Damian Warner	Result	10.48	7.54	13.73	2.05	48.20	14.38	45.90	4.70	62.77	4:29.85	8442	5
Damian Warner	Points	980	945	712	850	899	926	785	819	780	746	8442	5

Women
Track & road events

Athlete	Event	Heat		Quarterfinal		Semifinal		Final	
Athlete	Event	Result	Rank	Result	Rank	Result	Rank	Result	Rank
Kerri-Ann Mitchell	100 m	Bye		11.49	6	Did not advance			
Crystal Emmanuel	200 m	23.10	5 q	—N/a		23.28	7	Did not advance	
Jenna Martin	400 m	51.98	3 Q	—N/a		52.83	7	Did not advance	
Melissa Bishop	800 m	2:09.33	6	—N/a		Did not advance			
Jessica Smith	800 m	2:07.75	2 Q	—N/a		2:01.90	7	Did not advance	
Nicole Sifuentes	1500 m	4:07.65	7 q	—N/a		4:06.33	11	Did not advance	
Hilary Stellingwerff	1500 m	4:05.79	6 Q	—N/a		4:05.57	6	Did not advance	
Sheila Reid	5000 m	15:27.41	15	—N/a				Did not advance	
Phylicia George	100 m hurdles	12.83	2 Q	—N/a		12.65	3 q	12.65	6
Nikkita Holder	100 m hurdles	12.93	5 q	—N/a		12.93	6	Did not advance	
Jessica Zelinka	100 m hurdles	12.75	2 Q	—N/a		12.66	2 Q	12.69	7
Sarah Wells	400 m hurdles	56.47	4 Q	—N/a		56.71	8	Did not advance	
Rachel Seaman	20 km walk	—N/a						1:37:36	52

Field events

Athlete	Event	Qualification		Final	
Athlete	Event	Distance	Position	Distance	Position
Mélanie Blouin	Pole vault	4.25	19	Did not advance	
Julie Labonté	Shot put	17.48	23	Did not advance	
Elizabeth Gleadle	Javelin throw	60.26	11 q	58.78	12
Sultana Frizell	Hammer throw	67.45	26	Did not advance	
Heather Steacy	Hammer throw	63.40	34	Did not advance	

Combined events – Heptathlon

Athlete	Event	100H	HJ	SP	200 m	LJ	JT	800 m	Final	Rank
Brianne Theisen	Result	13.30	1.83	12.89	24.35	6.01	46.47	2:09.	6383	11
Brianne Theisen	Points	1080	1016	720	947	853	792	975	6383	11
Jessica Zelinka	Result	12.65	1.68	14.81	23.32	5.91	45.75	2:09.15	6460	7
Jessica Zelinka	Points	1178	830	848	1047	822	778	977	6460	7

== Badminton ==
Canada qualified four badminton athletes. The team was officially announced on 18 May 2012. The women's doubles pairing of Alex Bruce and Michelle Li finished last in the round-robin portion, losing all three of their matches. However, the top two teams in the group were disqualified for attempting to intentionally lose matches so they would have an easier match-up in the quarterfinals. The duo was advanced to their quarterfinals and won, but lost in the semifinals and bronze medal game.

Athlete	Event	Group Stage				Elimination	Quarterfinal	Semifinal	Final	
Athlete	Event	Opposition Score	Opposition Score	Opposition Score	Rank	Opposition Score	Opposition Score	Opposition Score	Opposition Score	Rank
Michelle Li	Women's singles	Wang Yh (CHN); L 8–21, 16–21	—N/a		2	Did not advance				
Michelle Li; Alex Bruce	Women's doubles	Wang Xl; Yu Y (CHN); W 21–0, 21–0 DSQ	Jung K-e / Kim H-n (KOR); W 21–0, 21–0 DSQ	Sorokina / Vislova (RUS); L 8–21, 10–21	2	—N/a	Choo / Veeran (AUS); W 21–9, 18–21, 21–18	Fujii / Kakiiwa (JPN); L 12–21, 21–19, 13–21	Sorokina / Vislova (RUS); L 9–21, 10–21	4
Grace Gao; Toby Ng	Mixed doubles	Fischer Nielsen / Pedersen (DEN); L 12–21, 11–21	Ikeda / Shiota (JPN); L 10–21, 21–11, 15–21	Mateusiak / Zięba (POL); L 13–21, 16–21	3	—N/a	Did not advance			

== Basketball ==
Canada qualified a women's basketball team. Canada's team officially qualified on Canada Day (1 July) and became the 12th and final team to qualify for the tournament.

=== Women's tournament ===
Team roster

The following is the Canada roster in the women's basketball tournament of the 2012 Summer Olympics.

Canada women's national basketball team – 2012 Summer Olympics roster
Players
Coaches

Pos.	No.	Name	Age – Date of birth	Height	Club	Ctr.
C	4	Krista Phillips	24 – 18 May 1988	1.98 m (6 ft 6 in)	Dandenong Rangers	(Australia)
G	5	Teresa Gabriele	33 – 23 January 1979	1.65 m (5 ft 5 in)	Free agent
PG	6	Shona Thorburn	29 – 7 August 1982	1.78 m (5 ft 10 in)	Uni Girona CB	(Spain)
SG	7	Courtnay Pilypaitis	24 – 11 February 1988	1.85 m (6 ft 1 in)	VICI Kaunas	(Lithuania)
SG	8	Kim Smith	28 – 7 May 1984	1.85 m (6 ft 1 in)	Free agent
PF	9	Miranda Ayim	24 – 6 May 1988	1.91 m (6 ft 3 in)	Istanbul University	(Turkey)
SG	10	Alisha Tatham	25 – 14 October 1986	1.80 m (5 ft 11 in)	Free agent
PF	11	Natalie Achonwa	19 – 2 November 1992	1.90 m (6 ft 3 in)	University of Notre Dame	(United States)
SF	12	Lizanne Murphy	28 – 15 March 1984	1.85 m (6 ft 1 in)	Tarbes Gespe Bigorre	(France)
G/F	13	Tamara Tatham	26 – 19 August 1985	1.85 m (6 ft 1 in)	SV Halle Lions	(Germany)
PF	14	Chelsea Aubry	28 – 27 June 1984	1.88 m (6 ft 2 in)	Bendigo Spirit	(Australia)
SF	15	Michelle Plouffe	19 – 15 September 1992	1.91 m (6 ft 3 in)	University of Utah	(United States)

Head coach

- (Canada) Allison McNeill

Assistant coach(es)

- (Canada) Lisa Thomaidis
- (Canada) Mike McNeill

Legend

- Club – describes last
  club before the tournament
- Age – describes age
  on 28 July 2012

Group play

Pos	Team	Pld	W	L	PF	PA	PD	Pts	Qualification
1	France	5	5	0	356	319	+37	10	Quarterfinals
2	Australia	5	4	1	353	322	+31	9	Quarterfinals
3	Russia	5	3	2	314	308	+6	8	Quarterfinals
4	Canada	5	2	3	328	332	−4	7	Quarterfinals
5	Brazil	5	1	4	329	354	−25	6	
6	Great Britain (H)	5	0	5	327	372	−45	5	

Source: [ FIBA archive]
Rules for classification: 1) points; 2) head-to-head points; 3) head-to-head goal average; 4) head-to-head number of points scored.
(H) Hosts

28 July 2012
11:15

Report

Canada	53–58	Russia
Scoring by quarter: 17–15, 13–9, 13–13, 10–21
Pts: Smith 20; Rebs: T. Tatham 5 Asts: Thorburn 6		Pts: Hammon 14; Rebs: Osipova 12; Asts: Danilochkina 6

Basketball Arena, London
Referees: Recep Ankaralı (TUR), Peng Ling (CHN), Samir Abaakil (MAR)

30 July 2012
20:00

Report

Great Britain	65–73	Canada
Scoring by quarter: 15–19, 17–17, 21–19, 12–18
Pts: Stafford, Leedham 15; Rebs: Fagbenle 6 Asts: Collins 4		Pts: Thorburn 18; Rebs: Pilypaitis, T. Tatham 5 Asts: Gabriele 7

Basketball Arena, London
Referees: Juan Arteaga (ESP), Saša Pukl (SLO), Vitalis Gode (KEN)

1 August 2012
09:00

Report

Canada	60–64	France
Scoring by quarter: 12–13, 13–15, 15–14, 20–22
Pts: Thorburn 17; Rebs: Achonwa 8 Asts: Thorburn 3		Pts: Gomis 16; Rebs: Gruda 6 Asts: three players 3

Basketball Arena, London
Referees: Luigi Lamonica (ITA), Pablo Estévez (ARG), Shoko Suguro (JPN)

3 August 2012
14:30

Report

Brazil	73–79	Canada
Scoring by quarter: 8–18, 17–21, 28–16, 20–24
Pts: de Souza 22; Rebs: Rodrigues 4 Asts: de Souza 12		Pts: Pilypaitis, Smith 14; Rebs: Thorburn 8 Asts: Smith 5

Basketball Arena, London
Referees: José Carrion (PUR), Borys Ryschyk (UKR), Carole Delauné (FRA)

5 August 2012
14:30

Report

Canada	63–72	Australia
Scoring by quarter: 10–24, 12–11, 20–12, 21–25
Pts: Smith 17; Rebs: Murphy 5 Asts: Thorburn 5		Pts: Snell 12; Rebs: Jackson 9 Asts: Screen, Harrower 4

Basketball Arena, London
Referees: Felicia Grinter (USA), Oļegs Latiševs (LAT), Snehal Bendke (IND)

Quarter-final

7 August 2012
14:00

Report

United States	91–48	Canada
Scoring by quarter: 19–8, 23–13, 26–10, 23–17
Pts: Taurasi 15; Rebs: Moore, Parker 7 Asts: Bird 5		Pts: Smith 13; Rebs: Phillips 8 Asts: Phillips 5

Basketball Arena, London
Referees: Guerrino Cerebuch (ITA), Shoko Sugruro (JPN), Vitalis Gode (KEN)

== Boxing ==
Canada qualified three boxers to compete in London. Two male boxers qualified at the Pan American qualification event. Mary Spencer was awarded a wildcard by the International Boxing Association.

Athlete	Event	Round of 32	Round of 16	Quarterfinals	Semifinals	Final	
Athlete	Event	Opposition Result	Opposition Result	Opposition Result	Opposition Result	Opposition Result	Rank
Custio Clayton	Men's welterweight	Molina (MEX); W 12–8	Hammond (AUS); W 14–11	Evans (GBR); L 14–14^{+}	Did not advance		
Simon Kean	Men's super heavyweight	—N/a	Yoka (FRA); W 16^{+}–16	Dychko (KAZ); L 6–20	Did not advance		
Mary Spencer	Women's middleweight	—N/a	Bye	Li Jz (CHN); L 14–17	Did not advance		

== Canoeing ==
Canada qualified eight canoe/kayak athletes.

=== Slalom ===
Canada qualified a boat for the following event:

Athlete	Event	Preliminary						Semifinal		Final	
Athlete	Event	Run 1	Rank	Run 2	Rank	Best	Rank	Time	Rank	Time	Rank
Michael Tayler	Men's K-1	155.89	21	97.64	18	97.64	20	Did not advance			

=== Sprint ===
Canada qualified boats for the following events:

Men

Athlete	Event	Heats		Semifinals		Final	
Athlete	Event	Time	Rank	Time	Rank	Time	Rank
Mark de Jonge	K-1 200 m	35.396	1 Q	35.595	1 FA	36.657	3rd place, bronze medalist(s)
Jason McCoombs	C-1 200 m	41.742	2 Q	42.255	5 FB	44.793	13
Mark Oldershaw	C-1 1000 m	3:55.211	2 Q	3:52.197	2 FA	3:48.502	3rd place, bronze medalist(s)
Adam van Koeverden	K-1 1000 m	3:28.697	1 Q	3:28.209	1 FA	3:27.170	2nd place, silver medalist(s)
Ryan Cochrane; Hugues Fournel	K-2 200 m	33.407	4 Q	33.500	4 FA	35.396	7
Ryan Cochrane; Hugues Fournel	K-2 1000 m	3:55.748	6 Q	3:29.819	5 FB	3:18.550	12

Women

Athlete	Event	Heats		Semifinals		Final	
Athlete	Event	Time	Rank	Time	Rank	Time	Rank
Émilie Fournel	K-1 200 m	43.117	5 Q	43.030	7	Did not advance	
Émilie Fournel	K-1 500 m	1:58.740	5 Q	1:54.120	6 FB	1:56.058	14

Qualification Legend: FA = Qualify to final (medal); FB = Qualify to final B (non-medal)

== Cycling ==
Canada qualified cyclists for the following events

=== Road ===
Athlete	Event	Time	Rank
Ryder Hesjedal	Men's road race	5:46:37	62
Ryder Hesjedal	Men's time trial	56:06.18	28
Clara Hughes	Women's road race	3:36:01	32
Clara Hughes	Women's time trial	38:28.96	5
Denise Ramsden	Women's road race	3:35:56	27
Denise Ramsden	Women's time trial	41:44.81	19
Joëlle Numainville	Women's road race	3:35:56	12

=== Track ===
Sprint

Athlete	Event	Qualification		Round 1	Repechage 1	Round 2	Repechage 2	Quarterfinals	Semifinals	Final	
Athlete	Event	Time Speed (km/h)	Rank	Opposition Time Speed (km/h)	Opposition Time Speed (km/h)	Opposition Time Speed (km/h)	Opposition Time Speed (km/h)	Opposition Time Speed (km/h)	Opposition Time Speed (km/h)	Opposition Time Speed (km/h)	Rank
Monique Sullivan	Women's sprint	11.347; 63.452	12	Lee W S (HKG); L	Lee H-J (KOR); Maeda (JPN); W 11.572; 62.219	Meares (AUS); L	Panarina (BLR); Maeda (JPN); L	Did not advance		9th place final Kanis (NED); Lee W S (HKG); Hansen (NZL); L	11

Pursuit

Athlete	Event	Qualification		Semifinals		Final	
Athlete	Event	Time	Rank	Opponent results	Rank	Opponent results	Rank
Gillian Carleton; Jasmin Glaesser; Tara Whitten	Women's team pursuit	3:19.816	4 Q	Great Britain; 3:17.454	4	Australia; 3:17.915	3rd place, bronze medalist(s)

- Note: Laura Brown was named on the women's team pursuit squad but did not compete.

Keirin

Athlete	Event	1st round	Repechage	2nd round	Final
Athlete	Event	Rank	Rank	Rank	Rank
Joseph Veloce	Men's keirin	4 R	4	Did not advance	13
Monique Sullivan	Women's keirin	5 R	3 Q	2 Q	6

Omnium

Athlete	Event	Flying lap		Points race		Elimination race	Individual pursuit		Scratch race	Time trial		Total points	Rank
Athlete	Event	Time	Rank	Points	Rank	Rank	Time	Rank	Rank	Time	Rank	Total points	Rank
Zachary Bell	Men's omnium	13.406	7	4	13	10	4:29.411	8	1	1:04.328	10	49	8
Tara Whitten	Women's omnium	14.516	7	28	3	8	3:31.113	3	6	36.509	10	37	4

Legend: Q=Qualified to next round; R=Repechage

=== Mountain biking ===
Athlete	Event	Time	Rank
Geoff Kabush	Men's cross-country	1:30:43	8
Max Plaxton	Men's cross-country	Did not finish	
Emily Batty	Women's cross-country	1:40:37	20
Catharine Pendrel	Women's cross-country	1:34:28	9

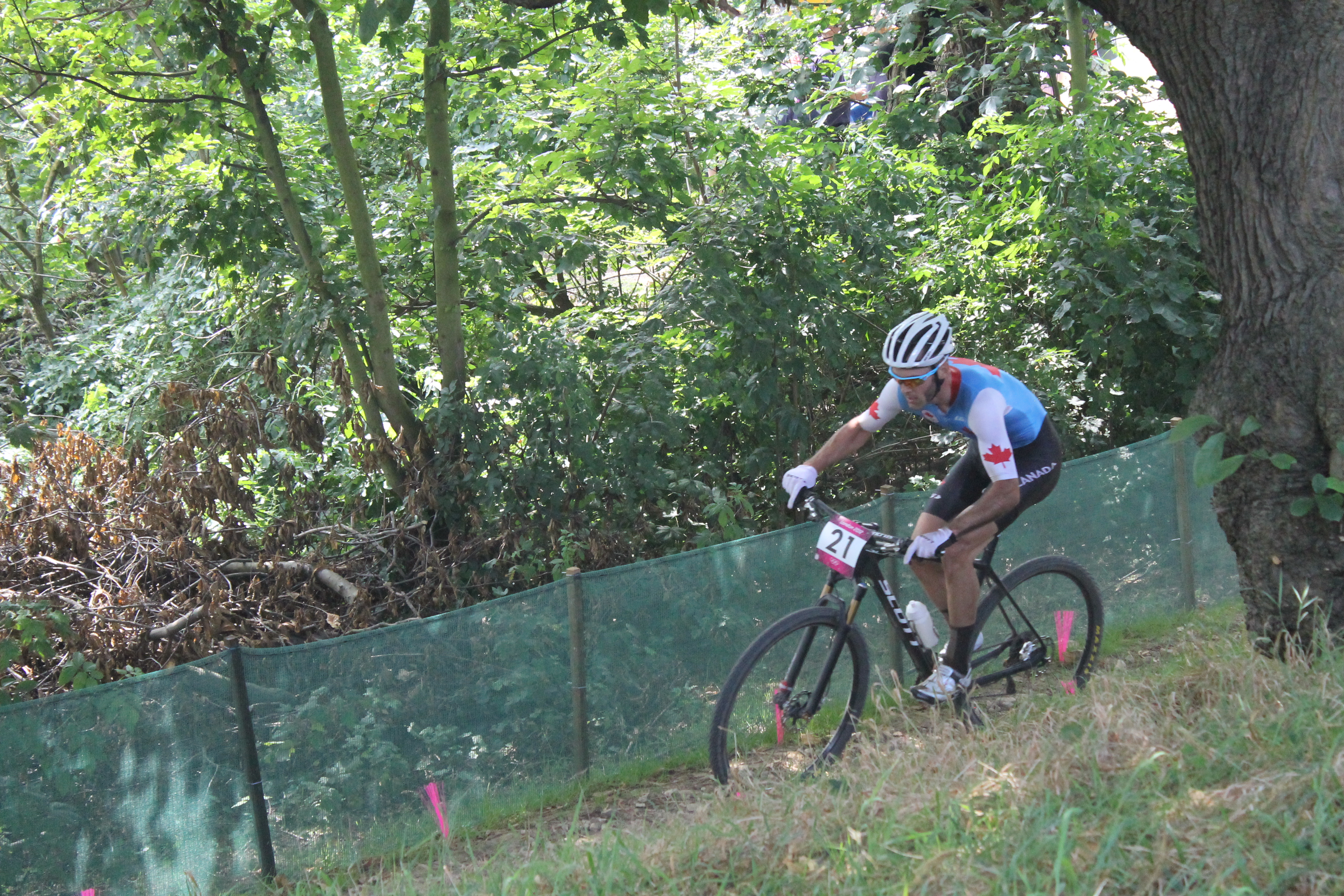
Geoff Kabush in men's cross country race

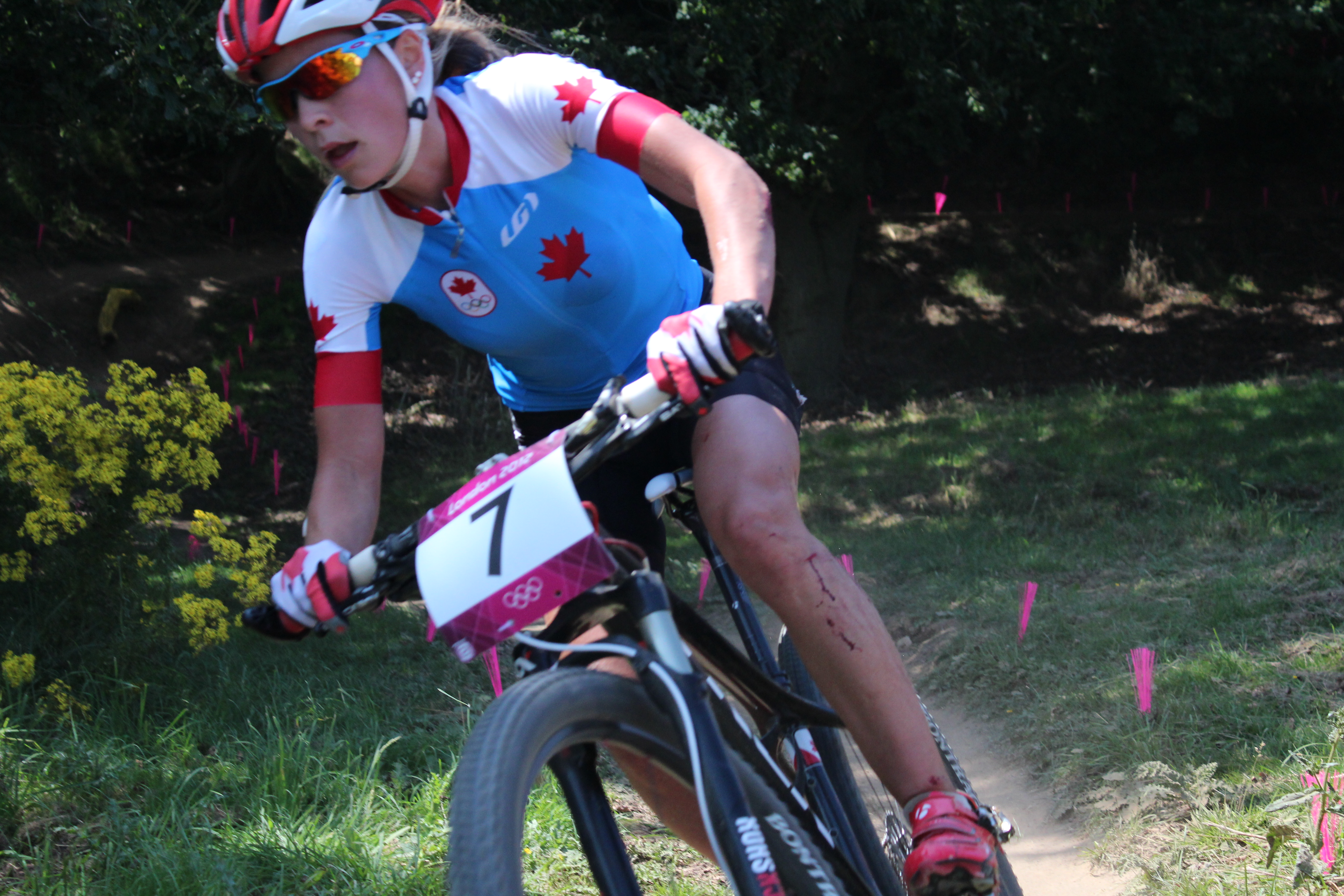
Emily Batty in women's cross country race

=== BMX ===
Athlete	Event	Seeding		Quarterfinal		Semifinal		Final	
Athlete	Event	Result	Rank	Points	Rank	Points	Rank	Result	Rank
Tory Nyhaug	Men's BMX	39.515	20	20	5	Did not advance			

== Diving ==
Canada qualified 11 quota spots in diving. On 28 May 2012, nine athletes were announced to the team.

Men

Athlete	Event	Preliminaries		Semifinals		Final	
Athlete	Event	Points	Rank	Points	Rank	Points	Rank
Alexandre Despatie	3 m springboard	458.55	9 Q	472.80	8 Q	413.35	11
François Imbeau-Dulac	3 m springboard	449.30	12 Q	440.20	13	Did not advance	
Riley McCormick	10 m platform	452.75	11 Q	495.60	12 Q	493.35	11
Eric Sehn	10 m platform	363.90	29	Did not advance			
Alexandre Despatie; Reuben Ross	3 m synchronized springboard	—N/a				421.83	6

Women

Athlete	Event	Preliminaries		Semifinals		Final	
Athlete	Event	Points	Rank	Points	Rank	Points	Rank
Jennifer Abel	3 m springboard	344.15	4 Q	353.25	4 Q	343.00	6
Émilie Heymans	3 m springboard	337.20	6 Q	331.35	8 Q	295.20	12
Meaghan Benfeito	10 m platform	325.50	10 Q	359.90	2 Q	345.15	11
Roseline Filion	10 m platform	314.85	17 Q	329.60	8 Q	349.10	10
Jennifer Abel; Émilie Heymans	3 m synchronized springboard	—N/a				316.80	3rd place, bronze medalist(s)
Meaghan Benfeito; Roseline Filion	10 m synchronized platform	—N/a				337.62	3rd place, bronze medalist(s)

== Equestrian ==
Canada qualified a full team in dressage and eventing team competitions through the 2011 Pan American Games. Canada qualified a team in jumping team competition.

Canada also qualified three athletes in the individual dressage competition, and 5 athletes in the individual eventing competition. They also qualified four athletes in the individual jumping competition.

=== Dressage ===
Athlete	Horse	Event	Grand Prix		Grand Prix Special		Grand Prix Freestyle		Overall	
Athlete	Horse	Event	Score	Rank	Score	Rank	Technical	Artistic	Score	Rank
Jacqueline Brooks	D Niro	Individual	68.526	41	Did not advance					
Ashley Nicoll-Holzer	Breaking Dawn	Individual	71.809	20 Q	71.317	24	Did not advance			
David Marcus	Chrevi's Capital	Individual	Eliminated		Did not advance					
Jacqueline Brooks; Ashley Nicoll-Holzer; David Marcus	See above	Team	Eliminated		Did not advance					

=== Eventing ===
Athlete	Horse	Event	Dressage		Cross-country			Jumping						Total	
Athlete	Horse	Event	Dressage		Cross-country			Qualifier			Final			Total	
Athlete	Horse	Event	Penalties	Rank	Penalties	Total	Rank	Penalties	Total	Rank	Penalties	Total	Rank	Penalties	Rank
Peter Barry	Kilordan Abbott	Individual	61.70	67	Eliminated			Did not advance							
Hawley Bennett-Awad	Gin & Juice	Individual	48.70	31	Eliminated			Did not advance							
Rebecca Howard	Riddle Master	Individual	50.60	=34	Eliminated			Did not advance							
Michele Mueller	Armistad	Individual	57.00	56	63.20	120.20	58	Did not advance							
Jessica Phoenix	Exponential	Individual	54.80	=50	2.40	57.20	28	14.00	71.20	29 Q	8.00	79.20	22	79.20	22
Peter Barry; Hawley Bennett-Awad; Rebecca Howard; Michele Mueller; Jessica Phoenix	See above	Team	154.10	11	1023.30	1177.40	11	893.80	2071.20	13	—N/a			2071.20	13

=== Jumping ===
Athlete	Horse	Event	Qualification								Final					Total	
Athlete	Horse	Event	Round 1		Round 2			Round 3			Round A		Round B			Total	
Athlete	Horse	Event	Penalties	Rank	Penalties	Total	Rank	Penalties	Total	Rank	Penalties	Rank	Penalties	Total	Rank	Penalties	Rank
Tiffany Foster	Victor	Individual	8	60	DSQ			Did not advance								8	60
Jill Henselwood	George	Individual	5	53	4	9	47	Did not advance								9	47
Eric Lamaze	Derly Chin de Muze	Individual	0	1	1	1	13 Q	8	9	11 Q	12	29	Did not advance			12	29
Ian Millar	Star Power	Individual	4	42	0	4	17 Q	4	8	22 Q	4	11 Q	4	8	9	8	9
Tiffany Foster; Jill Henselwood; Eric Lamaze; Ian Millar	See above	Team	—N/a								5	6 Q	21	26	5	26	5

== Fencing ==
Canada qualified five fencers.

Athlete	Event	Round of 64	Round of 32	Round of 16	Quarterfinal	Semifinal	Final / BM	
Athlete	Event	Opposition Score	Opposition Score	Opposition Score	Opposition Score	Opposition Score	Opposition Score	Rank
Étienne Lalonde Turbide	Men's foil	Bye	Massialas (USA); L 6–15	Did not advance				
Philippe Beaudry	Men's sabre	Bye	Lapkes (BLR); L 10–15	Did not advance				
Sherraine Schalm	Women's épée	Bye	Shin A-L (KOR); L 12–15	Did not advance				
Monica Peterson	Women's foil	Bentley (GBR); W 10–9	Kiefer (USA); L 10–15	Did not advance				
Sandra Sassine	Women's sabre	—N/a	Socha (POL); L 7–15	Did not advance				

== Football (soccer) ==
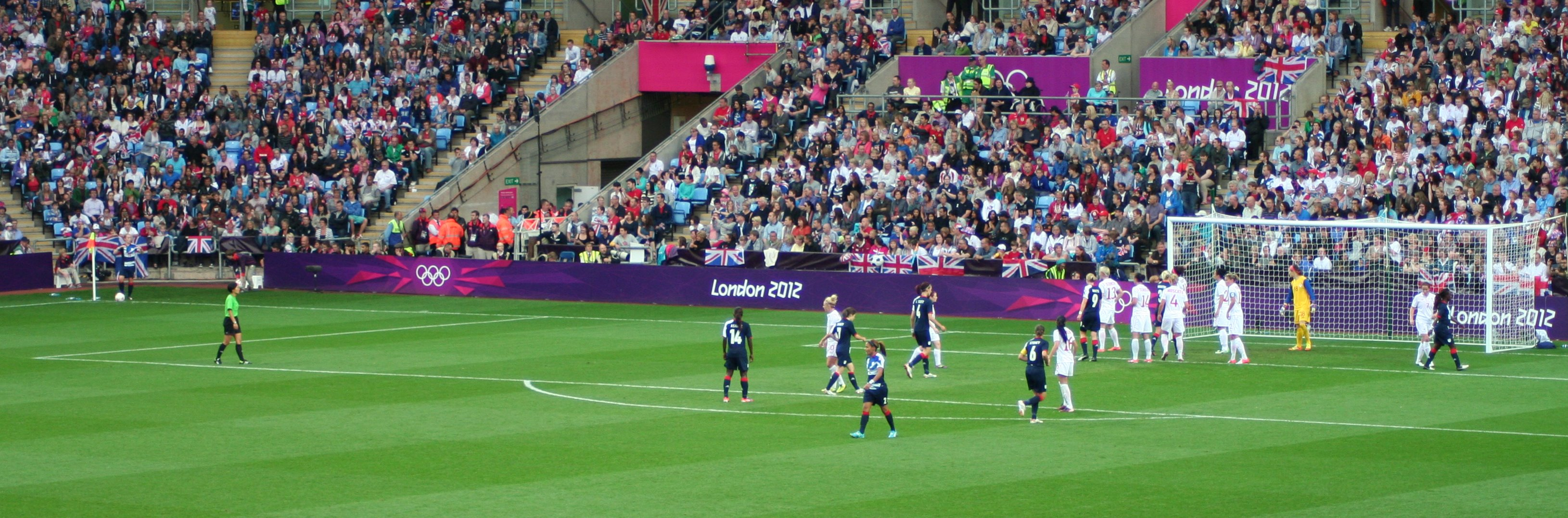
Canada versus Great Britain in the quarterfinals.

Canada qualified a women's team.

- Women's team – 18 athletes

=== Women's tournament ===
Team roster

Head coach: (United Kingdom) John Herdman

Canada named a squad of 18 players and 4 alternates for the tournament. During the tournament, Melanie Booth replaced Emily Zurrer and Marie-Ève Nault replaced Robyn Gayle on 30 July 2012 due to injury.

No.	Pos.	Player	Date of birth (age)	Caps	Goals	Club
1	GK	Karina LeBlanc	30 March 1980 (aged 32)	102	0	(United States Soccer Federation) Sky Blue
2	DF	Emily Zurrer	12 July 1987 (aged 25)	55	3	(Swedish Football Association) Dalsjöfors
3	DF	Chelsea Stewart	28 April 1990 (aged 22)	35	0	(United States Soccer Federation) UCLA Bruins
4	DF	Carmelina Moscato	2 May 1984 (aged 28)	64	2	(Swedish Football Association) Piteå IF
5	DF	Robyn Gayle	31 October 1985 (aged 26)	62	2	Unattached
6	MF	Kaylyn Kyle	6 October 1988 (aged 23)	59	4	(Canadian Soccer Association) Vancouver Whitecaps
7	DF	Rhian Wilkinson	12 May 1982 (aged 30)	125	7	Unattached
8	MF	Diana Matheson	6 April 1984 (aged 28)	135	11	Unattached
9	DF	Candace Chapman	2 April 1983 (aged 29)	112	6	(United States Soccer Federation) Sky Blue
10	DF	Lauren Sesselmann	14 August 1983 (aged 28)	20	0	Unattached
11	MF	Desiree Scott	31 July 1987 (aged 24)	47	0	(Canadian Soccer Association) Vancouver Whitecaps
12	FW	Christine Sinclair (captain)	12 June 1983 (aged 29)	184	137	Unattached
13	MF	Sophie Schmidt	28 June 1988 (aged 24)	90	7	(Swedish Football Association) Kristianstads
14	FW	Melissa Tancredi	27 December 1981 (aged 30)	82	18	(Swedish Football Association) Piteå IF
15	MF	Kelly Parker	8 March 1981 (aged 31)	37	3	(United States Soccer Federation) Atlanta Beat
16	FW	Jonelle Filigno	24 September 1990 (aged 21)	45	8	(United States Soccer Federation) Rutgers Scarlet Knights
17	MF	Brittany Timko	5 September 1985 (aged 26)	115	4	Unattached
18	GK	Erin McLeod	26 February 1983 (aged 29)	74	0	(Swedish Football Association) Dalsjöfors
19	DF	Melanie Booth	24 August 1984 (aged 27)	63	2	(Canadian Soccer Association) Vancouver Whitecaps
20	DF	Marie-Ève Nault	16 February 1982 (aged 30)	49	0	Unattached

Group play

Pos	Team	Pld	W	D	L	GF	GA	GD	Pts	Qualification
1	Sweden	3	1	2	0	6	3	+3	5	Qualified for the quarter-finals
2	Japan	3	1	2	0	2	1	+1	5	Qualified for the quarter-finals
3	Canada	3	1	1	1	6	4	+2	4	Qualified for the quarter-finals
4	South Africa	3	0	1	2	1	7	−6	1	

Source: IOC
25 July 2012
17:00

Japan	2–1	Canada
Kawasumi 33'; Miyama 44'	Report	Tancredi 55'

City of Coventry Stadium, Coventry
Attendance: 14,119
Referee: Kirsi Heikkinen (Finland)

28 July 2012
14:45

Canada	3–0	South Africa
Tancredi 7'; Sinclair 58', 86'	Report

City of Coventry Stadium, Coventry
Attendance: 14,753
Referee: Christina Pedersen (Norway)

31 July 2012
14:30

Canada	2–2	Sweden
Tancredi 43', 84'	Report; Report	Hammarström 14'; Jakobsson 16'

St James' Park, Newcastle
Attendance: 12,719
Referee: Hong Eun-ah (South Korea)

Quarter-final

3 August 2012
19:30

Great Britain	0–2	Canada
	Report	Filigno 12'; Sinclair 26'

City of Coventry Stadium, Coventry
Attendance: 28,828
Referee: Sachiko Yamagishi (Japan)

Semi-final

6 August 2012
19:45

Canada	3–4 (a.e.t.)	United States
Sinclair 22', 67', 73'	Report	Rapinoe 54', 70'; Wambach 80' (pen.); Morgan 120+3'

Old Trafford, Manchester
Attendance: 26,630
Referee: Christina Pedersen (Norway)

Bronze medal game

9 August 2012
13:00

(bronze) Canada	1–0	France
Matheson 90+2'	Report

City of Coventry Stadium, Coventry
Attendance: 12,465
Referee: Jenny Palmqvist (Sweden)

(bronze) Won bronze medal

== Gymnastics ==
Canada selected a team of athletes competing in artistic, rhythmic, and trampoline gymnastics. For the second time in its Olympic history, Canada qualified for the women's artistic gymnastics team final, the first since the 1984 Summer Olympics in Los Angeles, and the first in a non-boycotting games. In trampoline gymnastics, Rosannagh MacLennan, competing at her second Olympics, won Canada's only gold medal in the women's event. Three-time Olympic medallist Karen Cockburn, however, missed out of the medal standings for the first time.

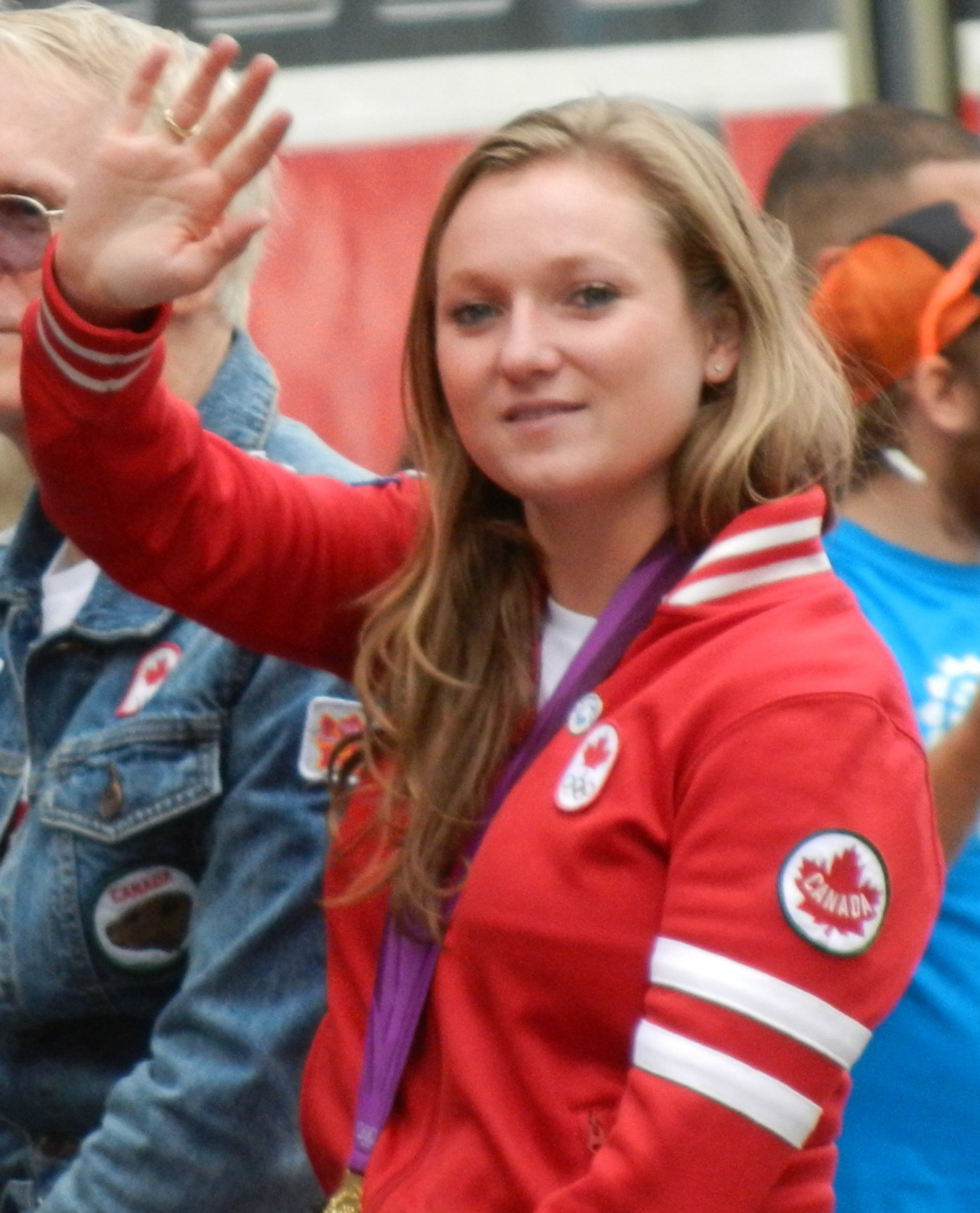
MacLennan at the Olympic Heroes Parade in Toronto (September 2012)

=== Artistic ===
Men

Athlete	Event	Qualification								Final							
Athlete	Event	Apparatus						Total	Rank	Apparatus						Total	Rank
Athlete	Event	F	PH	R	V	PB	HB	Total	Rank	F	PH	R	V	PB	HB	Total	Rank
Nathan Gafuik	Horizontal bar	—N/a					13.866	13.866	46	Did not advance							

Women

Athlete	Event	Qualification						Final					
Athlete	Event	Apparatus				Total	Rank	Apparatus				Total	Rank
Athlete	Event	F	V	UB	BB	Total	Rank	F	V	UB	BB	Total	Rank
Elsabeth Black	Team	14.233	—N/a	14.800	13.966	—N/a		14.208	15.233	—N/a	14.266	—N/a	
Victoria Moors	Team	—N/a	14.100	13.833	11.266	—N/a		14.600	—N/a	13.700	—N/a		
Dominique Pegg	Team	14.233	14.133	13.275	13.566	55.657	18 Q	13.966	14.400	—N/a	13.500	—N/a	
Brittany Rogers	Team	—N/a	14.666	14.500	—N/a			—N/a	14.866	14.466	—N/a		
Kristina Vaculik	Team	13.800	14.100	14.366	11.300	53.566	32 R	—N/a		14.166	13.433	—N/a	
Total	Team	43.599	42.699	38.832	42.566	167.696	8 Q	42.774	44.499	42.332	41.199	170.804	5

Individual finals

Athlete	Event	Apparatus				Total	Rank
Athlete	Event	F	V	UB	BB	Total	Rank
Dominique Pegg	All-around	14.033	14.566	13.800	13.166	55.565	17
Elsabeth Black	Vault	—N/a	0.000	—N/a		0.000	8
Brittany Rogers	Vault	—N/a	14.483	—N/a		14.483	7

=== Rhythmic ===
Athlete	Event	Qualification				Final			
Athlete	Event	5 balls	3 ribbons 2 hoops	Total	Rank	5 balls	3 ribbons 2 hoops	Total	Rank
Katrina Cameron; Rose Cossar; Alexandra Landry; Anastasiya Muntyanu; Anjelika Reznik; Kelsey Titmarsh	Team	24.050	23.975	48.025	11	Did not advance			

=== Trampoline ===
Athlete	Event	Qualification		Final	
Athlete	Event	Score	Rank	Score	Rank
Jason Burnett	Men's	109.065	6 Q	6.715	8
Karen Cockburn	Women's	103.943	5 Q	55.860	4
Rosannagh MacLennan	Women's	104.450	4 Q	57.305	1st place, gold medalist(s)

== Judo ==
Canada qualified eight judokas.

Men

Athlete	Event	Round of 64	Round of 32	Round of 16	Quarterfinals	Semifinals	Repechage	Final / BM	
Athlete	Event	Opposition Result	Opposition Result	Opposition Result	Opposition Result	Opposition Result	Opposition Result	Opposition Result	Rank
Sérgio Pessoa	−60 kg	Bye	Kossayev (KAZ); L 0000–0001 GS	Did not advance					
Sasha Mehmedovic	−66 kg	Figueroa (ESA); W 0010–0000 HRG	Ebinuma (JPN); L 0000–0111 UMA	Did not advance					
Nicholas Tritton	−73 kg	Bye	Jurakobilov (UZB); L 0002–0111 P29	Did not advance					
Antoine Valois-Fortier	−81 kg	Mammadli (AZE); W 0001–0001 GS	Burton (GBR); W 0100–0000 KGU	Mrvaljević (MNE); W 0112–0011 TOS	Nifontov (RUS); L 0000–0100 HRG	Did not advance	Lucenti (ARG); W 0101–0001 UMA	Stevens (USA); W 0011–0000 TGM	3rd place, bronze medalist(s)
Alexandre Émond	−90 kg	—N/a	Gordon (GBR); L 0000–1000 UMA	Did not advance					

Women

Athlete	Event	Round of 32	Round of 16	Quarterfinals	Semifinals	Repechage	Final / BM	
Athlete	Event	Opposition Result	Opposition Result	Opposition Result	Opposition Result	Opposition Result	Opposition Result	Rank
Joliane Melançon	−57 kg	Filzmoser (AUT); L 0010–0100 UKG	Did not advance					
Kelita Zupancic	−70 kg	Bye	Décosse (FRA); L 0001–1001 KSG	Did not advance				
Amy Cotton	−78 kg	Tcheuméo (FRA); L 0001-001 DAB	Did not advance					

== Modern pentathlon ==
Melanie McCann qualified through the 2011 Pan American Games

Athlete	Event	Fencing (épée one touch)			Swimming (200 m freestyle)			Riding (show jumping)			Combined: shooting/running (10 m air pistol)/(3000 m)			Total points	Final rank
Athlete	Event	Results	Rank	MP points	Time	Rank	MP points	Penalties	Rank	MP points	Time	Rank	MP Points	Total points	Final rank
Melanie McCann	Women's	19–16	=11	856	2:21.56	25	1104	20	4	1180	12:20.23	17	2040	5180	11
Donna Vakalis	Women's	17–18	=19	808	2:22.19	26	1096	356	32	844	12:10.03	11	2080	4828	29

== Rowing ==
Canada qualified seven boats.

Men

Athlete	Event	Heats		Repechage		Semifinals		Final	
Athlete	Event	Time	Rank	Time	Rank	Time	Rank	Time	Rank
Dave Calder; Scott Frandsen	Pair	6:23.80	1 SA/B	Bye		6:56.47	3 FA	6:30.49	6
Michael Braithwaite; Kevin Kowalyk	Double sculls	6:34.11	5 R	6:30.74	3 SA/B	6:38.94	6 FB	6:32.61	12
Morgan Jarvis; Douglas Vandor	Lightweight double sculls	6:42.59	3 R	6:36.03	4 SC/D	7:02.85	1 FC	6:46.52	14
Will Dean; Anthony Jacob; Derek O'Farrell; Michael Wilkinson	Four	5:50.78	3 SA/B	Bye		6:08.90	5 FB	6:11.15	9
Gabriel Bergen; Jeremiah Brown; Andrew Byrnes; Will Crothers; Douglas Csima; Robert Gibson; Malcolm Howard; Conlin McCabe; Brian Price	Eight	5:37.91	4 R	5:27.41	2 FA	—N/a		5:49.98	2nd place, silver medalist(s)

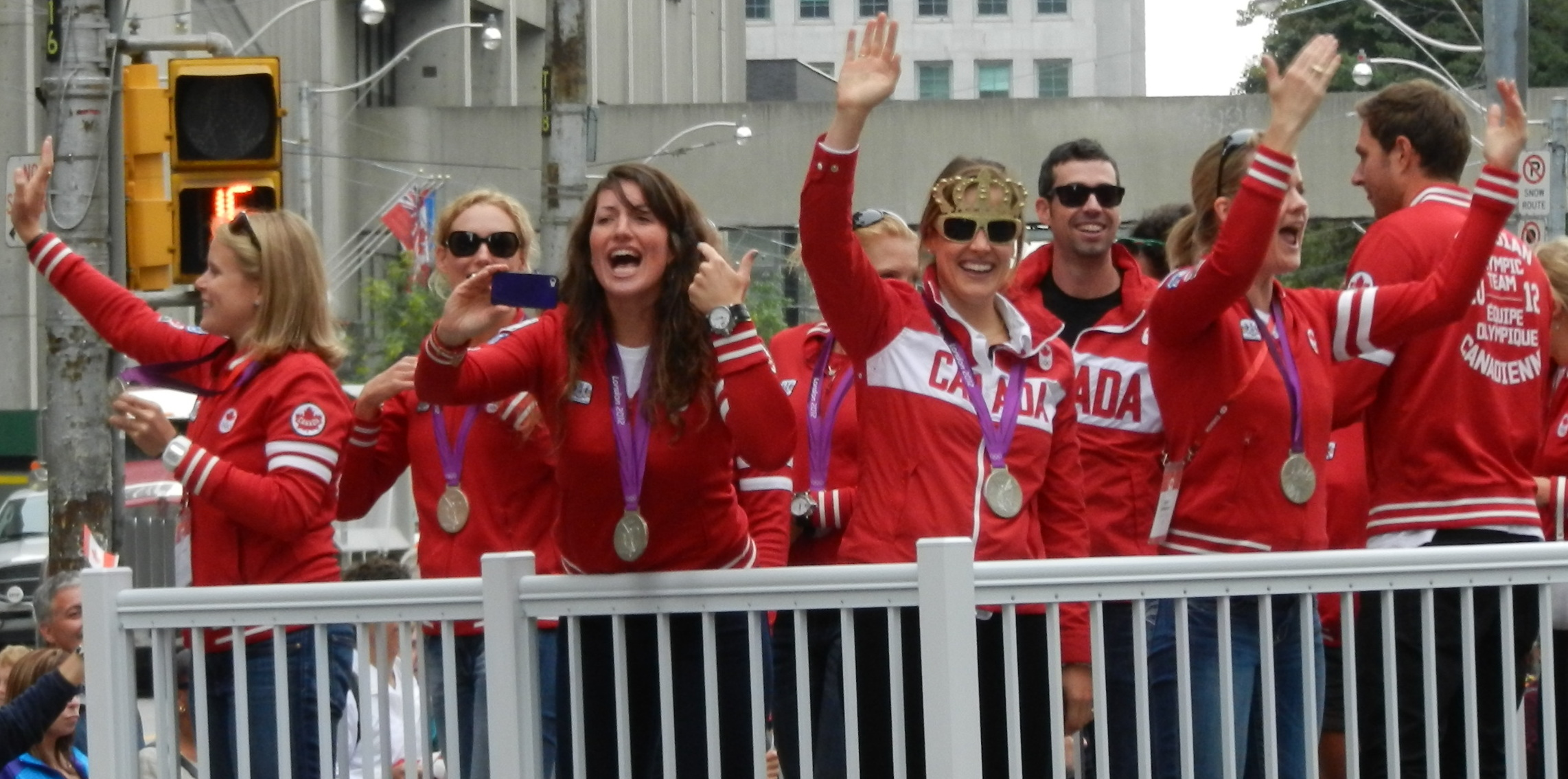
Members of the women's eight team at the Olympic Heroes Parade in Toronto (September 2012)

Women

Athlete	Event	Heats		Repechage		Semifinals		Final	
Athlete	Event	Time	Rank	Time	Rank	Time	Rank	Time	Rank
Lindsay Jennerich; Patricia Obee	Lightweight double sculls	7:10.89	5 R	7:15.37	2 SA/B	7:14.83	4 FB	7:17.24	7
Ashley Brzozowicz; Krista Guloien; Janine Hanson; Darcy Marquardt; Natalie Mastracci; Andréanne Morin; Lesley Thompson; Rachelle Viinberg; Lauren Wilkinson	Eight	6:13.91	1 FA	Bye		—N/a		6:12.06	2nd place, silver medalist(s)

Qualification Legend: FA=Final A (medal); FB=Final B (non-medal); FC=Final C (non-medal); FD=Final D (non-medal); FE=Final E (non-medal); FF=Final F (non-medal); SA/B=Semifinals A/B; SC/D=Semifinals C/D; SE/F=Semifinals E/F; QF=Quarterfinals; R=Repechage

== Sailing ==
Canada qualified 1 boat for each of the following events.

Men

Athlete	Event	Race											Net points	Final rank
Athlete	Event	1	2	3	4	5	6	7	8	9	10	M*	Net points	Final rank
Zachary Plavsic	RS:X	6	12	12	6	4	17	9	7	7	~~29~~	20	100	8
David Wright	Laser	18	15	9	31	14	24	~~42~~	6	29	38	EL	184	23
Gregory Douglas	Finn	16	~~23~~	16	13	12	18	13	17	20	12	EL	137	15
Mike Leigh; Luke Ramsay	470	~~26~~	20	21	21	19	19	16	20	26	19	EL	179	25
Richard Clarke; Tyler Bjorn	Star	16	10	6	8	10	~~17~~; ~~OCS~~	13	12	5	13	EL	93	12

Women

Athlete	Event	Race											Net points	Final rank
Athlete	Event	1	2	3	4	5	6	7	8	9	10	M*	Net points	Final rank
Nikola Girke	RS:X	6	14	10	6	8	10	13	4	19	18	~~20~~	109	10
Danielle Dubé	Laser Radial	22	21	20	~~33~~	31	32	25	17	24	28	EL	220	27

Open

Athlete	Event	Race																Net points	Final rank
Athlete	Event	1	2	3	4	5	6	7	8	9	10	11	12	13	14	15	M*	Net points	Final rank
Gordon Cook; Hunter Lowden	49er	3	16	5	17	9	17	16	8	11	16	7	8	20	9	~~21~~; ~~DNF~~	EL	162	16

M = Medal race; EL = Eliminated – did not advance into the medal race

== Shooting ==
Canada qualified the following shooters:

Athlete	Event	Qualification		Final	
Athlete	Event	Points	Rank	Points	Rank
Cory Niefer	Men's 50 m rifle prone	589	38	Did not advance	
Cory Niefer	Men's 10 m air rifle	581	46	Did not advance	
Dorothy Ludwig	Women's 10 m air pistol	376	34	Did not advance	

== Swimming ==
After the 2012 Canadian Olympic swimming trials held in late March in Montreal, 31 swimmers, (13 male and 18 female) an increase of four from the 2008 Summer Olympics.

Men

Athlete	Event	Heat		Semifinal		Final	
Athlete	Event	Time	Rank	Time	Rank	Time	Rank
Brent Hayden	50 m freestyle	22.15	13 Q	22.12	=14	Did not advance	
Brent Hayden	100 m freestyle	48.51	5 Q	48.21	6 Q	47.80	3rd place, bronze medalist(s)
Blake Worsley	200 m freestyle	1:48.14	17	Did not advance			
Ryan Cochrane	400 m freestyle	3:47.26	9	—N/a		Did not advance	
Ryan Cochrane	1500 m freestyle	14:49.41	3 Q	—N/a		14:39.63 AM	2nd place, silver medalist(s)
Charles Francis	100 m backstroke	54.08	13 Q	54.42	15	Did not advance	
Tobias Oriwol	200 m backstroke	1:58.06	11 Q	1:58.74	14	Did not advance	
Scott Dickens	100 m breaststroke	59.85 NR	7 Q	1:00.16	16	Did not advance	
Scott Dickens	200 m breaststroke	2:10.95	13 Q	2:11.71	16	Did not advance	
Joe Bartoch	100 m butterfly	53.09	27	Did not advance			
David Sharpe	200 m butterfly	1:59.87	31	Did not advance			
Andrew Ford	200 m individual medley	2:00.28	16 Q	2:01.58	15	Did not advance	
Alec Page	400 m individual medley	4:19.17	23	—N/a		Did not advance	
Thomas Gossland; Brent Hayden; Richard Hortness; Colin Russell	4 × 100 m freestyle relay	3:16.42	10	—N/a		Did not advance	
Tobias Oriwol; Alec Page; Colin Russell; Blake Worsley	4 × 200 m freestyle relay	7:15.22	14	—N/a		Did not advance	
Joe Bartoch; Scott Dickens; Charles Francis; Brent Hayden	4 × 100 m medley relay	3:34.46	8 Q	—N/a		3:34.19	8
Richard Weinberger	10 km open water	—N/a				1:50:00.3	3rd place, bronze medalist(s)

Women

Athlete	Event	Heat		Semifinal		Final	
Athlete	Event	Time	Rank	Time	Rank	Time	Rank
Victoria Poon	50 m freestyle	25.15	14 Q	25.17	15	Did not advance	
Julia Wilkinson	100 m freestyle	54.16	9 Q	54.25	13	Did not advance	
Samantha Cheverton	200 m freestyle	1:58.11	9 Q	1:57.98	11	Did not advance	
Barbara Jardin	200 m freestyle	1:57.92	6 Q	1:57.91	10	Did not advance	
Savannah King	400 m freestyle	4:10.93	18	—N/a		Did not advance	
Brittany MacLean	400 m freestyle	4:05.06 NR	6 Q	—N/a		4:06.24	7
Savannah King	800 m freestyle	8:29.72	15	—N/a		Did not advance	
Alexa Komarnycky	800 m freestyle	8:28.11	11	—N/a		Did not advance	
Sinead Russell	100 m backstroke	1:00.10	13 Q	1:00.57	16	Did not advance	
Julia Wilkinson	100 m backstroke	59.94	7 Q	59.91	9	Did not advance	
Hilary Caldwell	200 m backstroke	2:10.75	18	Did not advance			
Sinead Russell	200 m backstroke	2:09.04	7 Q	2:08.76	8 Q	2:09.86	8
Jillian Tyler	100 m breaststroke	1:07.81	15 Q	1:07.87	14	Did not advance	
Tera van Beilen	100 m breaststroke	1:07.85	16 Q	1:07.48	8* SO	Did not advance	
Martha McCabe	200 m breaststroke	2:26.39	13 Q	2:24.09	7 Q	2:23.16	5
Tera van Beilen	200 m breaststroke	2:27.70	21	Did not advance			
Katerine Savard	100 m butterfly	58.76	17 Q	59.22	16	Did not advance	
Audrey Lacroix	200 m butterfly	2:09.25	15 Q	2:08.00	12	Did not advance	
Katerine Savard	200 m butterfly	2:11.05	19	Did not advance			
Erica Morningstar	200 m individual medley	2:14.32	17	Did not advance			
Stephanie Horner	400 m individual medley	4:45.49	21	—N/a		Did not advance	
Samantha Cheverton; Heather MacLean; Victoria Poon; Julia Wilkinson	4 × 100 m freestyle relay	3:39.60	11	—N/a		Did not advance	
Samantha Cheverton; Barbara Jardin; Brittany MacLean; Amanda Reason	4 × 200 m freestyle relay	7:50.84	3 Q	—N/a		7:50.65	4
Victoria Poon; Sinead Russell; Katerine Savard; Jillian Tyler; Tera van Beilen; Julia Wilkinson	4 × 100 m medley relay	4:02.71	12	—N/a		Did not advance	
Zsofia Balazs	10 km open water	—N/a				2:01:17.8	18

* Tera van Beilen lost to Jamaica's Alia Atkinson in a swim-off match for the final.

== Synchronized swimming ==
Canada qualified a duet and a team by winning the 2011 Pan American Games.

Athlete	Event	Technical routine		Free routine (preliminary)			Free routine (final)		
Athlete	Event	Points	Rank	Points	Total (technical + free)	Rank	Points	Total (technical + free)	Rank
Marie-Pier Boudreau Gagnon; Élise Marcotte	Duet	94.500	4	94.750	189.250	4 Q	94.620	189.120	4
Marie-Pier Boudreau Gagnon; Stéphanie Durocher; Jo-Annie Fortin; Chloé Isaac; Stéphanie Leclair; Tracy Little; Élise Marcotte; Karine Thomas; Valerie Welsh	Team	94.400	4	—N/a			95.230	189.630	4

== Table tennis ==
Canada qualified a men's team, provisionally qualifying a third athlete. Zhang Mo qualified by winning the 2011 Pan American Games.

Athlete	Event	Preliminary round	Round 1	Round 2	Round 3	Round 4	Quarterfinals	Semifinals	Final / BM	
Athlete	Event	Opposition Result	Opposition Result	Opposition Result	Opposition Result	Opposition Result	Opposition Result	Opposition Result	Opposition Result	Rank
Pierre-Luc Hinse	Men's singles	Bye	Burģis (LAT); L (2–3)	Did not advance						
Andre Ho	Men's singles	Toriola (NGR); L (1–4)	Did not advance							
Pierre-Luc Hinse; Andre Ho; Zhen Wang	Men's team	—N/a				Japan; L (0–3)	Did not advance			
Zhang Mo	Women's singles	Majdi (QAT); W (4–0)	Hu (TUR); W (4–3)	Li (AUT); L (1–4)	Did not advance					

== Taekwondo ==
The Canadian team was selected after the senior Olympic trials held in January 2012.

Athlete	Event	Round of 16	Quarterfinals	Semifinals	Repechage	Bronze Medal	Final	
Athlete	Event	Opposition Result	Opposition Result	Opposition Result	Opposition Result	Opposition Result	Opposition Result	Rank
Sébastien Michaud	Men's −80 kg	Yeremyan (ARM); L 4–8	Did not advance					
François Coulombe-Fortier	Men's +80 kg	Umarov (RUS); W 7–3	Keïta (MLI); L 6–11	Did not advance				
Karine Sergerie	Women's −67 kg	Azizova (AZE); W 1–0	Anić (SLO); L 5–10	Did not advance				

== Tennis ==
Canada qualified three singles players, and two doubles teams.

Athlete	Event	Round of 64	Round of 32	Round of 16	Quarterfinals	Semifinals	Final / BM	
Athlete	Event	Opposition Score	Opposition Score	Opposition Score	Opposition Score	Opposition Score	Opposition Score	Rank
Milos Raonic	Men's singles	Ito (JPN); W 6–3, 6–4	Tsonga (FRA); L 3–6, 6–3, 23–25	Did not advance				
Vasek Pospisil	Men's singles	Ferrer (ESP); L 4–6, 4–6	Did not advance					
Daniel Nestor; Vasek Pospisil	Men's doubles	—N/a	Tecău / Ungur (ROU); W 6–3, 7–6^{(11–9)}	Tipsarević / Zimonjić (SRB); L 4–6, 7–6^{(7–5)}, 9–11	Did not advance			
Aleksandra Wozniak	Women's singles	Erakovic (NZL); W 6–2, 6–1	V. Williams (USA); L 1–6, 3–6	Did not advance				
Stéphanie Dubois; Aleksandra Wozniak	Women's doubles	—N/a	Shvedova / Voskoboeva (KAZ); L 2–6, 0–6	Did not advance				

== Triathlon ==
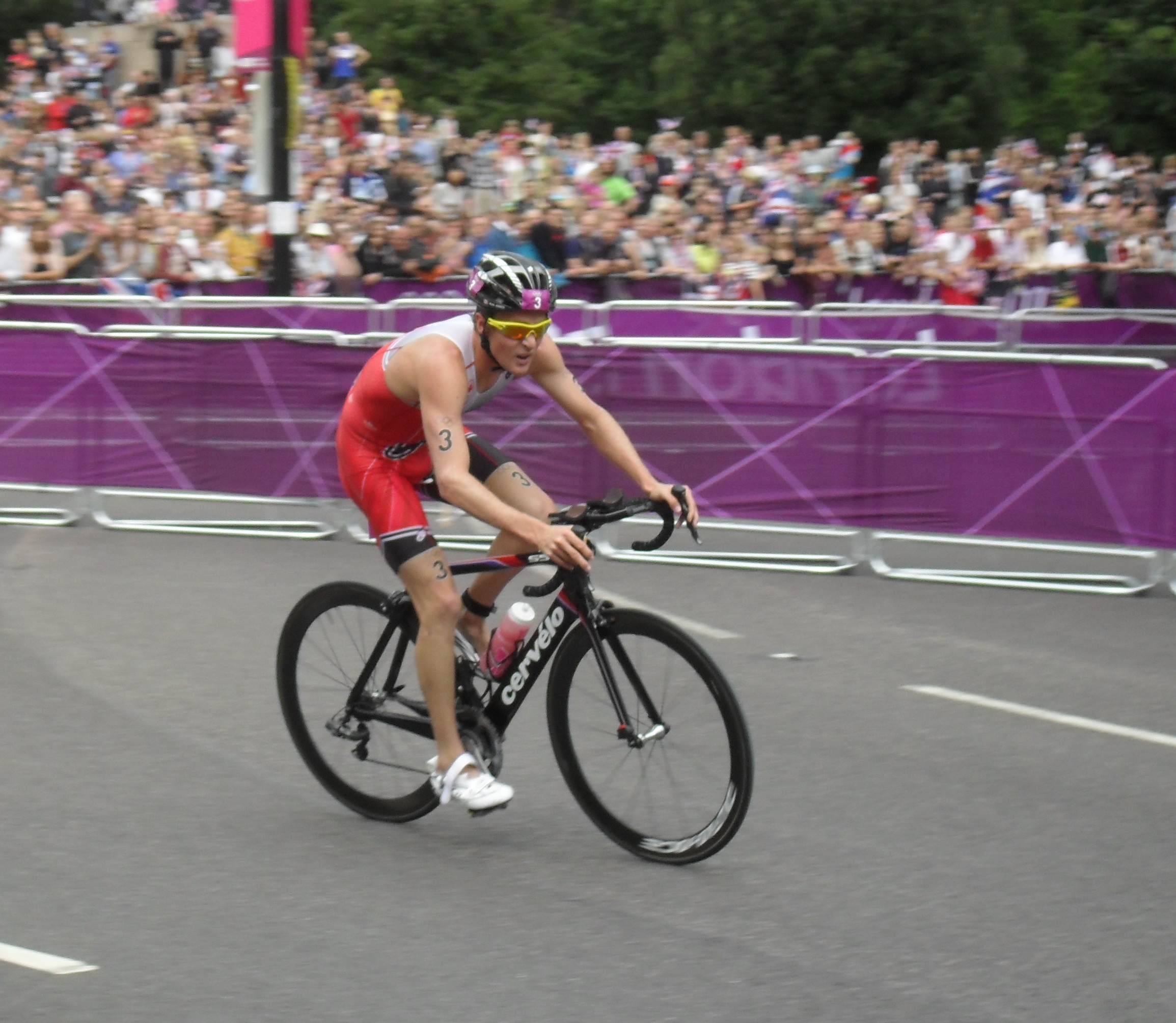
Kyle Jones during the triathlon.

Canada qualified five triathletes.

Athlete	Event	Swim (1.5 km)	Trans 1	Bike (40 km)	Trans 2	Run (10 km)	Total time	Rank
Kyle Jones	Men's	18:31	0:38	59:17	0:29	31:03	1:49:58	25
Brent McMahon	Men's	18:04	0:40	59:40	0:30	31:09	1:50:03	27
Simon Whitfield	Men's	17:23	0:44	Did not finish				
Paula Findlay	Women's	19:52	0:42	1:10:42	0:37	40:16	2:12:09	52
Kathy Tremblay	Women's	19:50	0:50	Did not finish				

== Volleyball ==
=== Beach ===
Both men's and women's team qualified after winning the NORCECA Continental Beach Volleyball Cup.

Athlete	Event	Preliminary round		Round of 16	Quarterfinals	Semifinals	Final / BM	
Athlete	Event	Opposition Score	Rank	Opposition Score	Opposition Score	Opposition Score	Opposition Score	Rank
Josh Binstock; Martin Reader	Men's	Pool F Garcia Thompson – Grotowski (GBR); W 2–0 (21–19, 21–13); Skarlund – Spinnangr (NOR); L 0–2 (14–21, 18–21); Cunha – Santos (BRA); L 0–2 (18–21, 22–24); Lucky Losers; Lupo – Nicolai (ITA); L 0–2 (16–21, 20–22)	3	Did not advance				17
Marie-Andrée Lessard; Annie Martin	Women's	Pool F Dampney – Mullin (GBR); L 1–2 (21–17, 14–21, 13–15); Khomyakova – Ukolova (RUS); L 1–2 (18–21, 30–28, 13–15); Cicolari – Menegatti (ITA); L 1–2 (12–21, 25–23, 10–15)	4	Did not advance				19

== Weightlifting ==
Canada obtained three women's quotas.

Athlete	Event	Snatch		Clean & jerk		Total	Rank
Athlete	Event	Result	Rank	Result	Rank	Total	Rank
Annie Moniqui	Women's −58 kg	85	18	105	16	190	14
Christine Girard	Women's −63 kg	103	4	133	2	236	1st place, gold medalist(s)
Marie-Ève Beauchemin	Women's −69 kg	104	10	135	6	239	6

== Wrestling ==
Canada qualified nine quota places in wrestling.

Key:

- VT – Victory by Fall.
- PP – Decision by Points – the loser with technical points.
- PO – Decision by Points – the loser without technical points.

Men's freestyle

Athlete	Event	Qualification	Round of 16	Quarterfinal	Semifinal	Repechage 1	Repechage 2	Final / BM	
Athlete	Event	Opposition Result	Opposition Result	Opposition Result	Opposition Result	Opposition Result	Opposition Result	Opposition Result	Rank
David Tremblay	−55 kg	Bye	Peker (TUR); L 1–3 ^{PP}	Did not advance					16
Haislan Garcia	−66 kg	Ben Alayech (TUN); W 5–0 ^{VF}	Yusupov (TJK); W 3–1 ^{PP}	Yonemitsu (JPN); L 1–3 ^{PP}	Did not advance	Bye	López (CUB); L 1–3 ^{PP}	Did not advance	7
Matt Gentry	−74 kg	Bye	Yadav (IND); W 3–1 ^{PP}	Burroughs (USA); L 1–3 ^{PP}	Did not advance	Bye	Soler (PUR); W 3–0 ^{PO}	Tsargush (RUS); L 0–3 ^{PO}	5
Khetag Pliev	−96 kg	Bye	Cortina (CUB); W 3–1 ^{PP}	Varner (USA); L 0–3 ^{PO}	Did not advance	Bye	Kurbanov (UZB); L 1–3 ^{PP}	Did not advance	10
Arjan Bhullar	−120 kg	Bye	Ghasemi (IRI); L 0–3 ^{PO}	Did not advance					13

Women's freestyle

Athlete	Event	Qualification	Round of 16	Quarterfinal	Semifinal	Repechage 1	Repechage 2	Final / BM	
Athlete	Event	Opposition Result	Opposition Result	Opposition Result	Opposition Result	Opposition Result	Opposition Result	Opposition Result	Rank
Carol Huynh	−48 kg	Bye	Nguyen (VIE); W 5–0 ^{VT}	Kaladzinskaya (BLR); W 3–0 ^{PO}	Obara (JPN); L 1–3 ^{PP}	Bye		Sambou (SEN); W 3–0 ^{PO}	3rd place, bronze medalist(s)
Tonya Verbeek	−55 kg	Bye	Phogat (IND); W 3–1 ^{PP}	Lazareva (UKR); W 3–0 ^{PO}	Rentería (COL); W 3–0 ^{PO}	Bye		Yoshida (JPN); L 0–3 ^{PO}	2nd place, silver medalist(s)
Martine Dugrenier	−63 kg	Bye	Icho (JPN); L 1–3 ^{PP}	Did not advance		Bye	Johansson (SWE); W 3–1 ^{PP}	Battsetseg (MGL); L 0–3 ^{PO}	5
Leah Callahan	−72 kg	Bye	Ochirbat (MGL); L 0–3 ^{PO}	Did not advance					18

== See also ==
- Canada at the 2011 Pan American Games
- Canada at the 2012 Winter Youth Olympics
- Canada at the 2012 Summer Paralympics
