= Stergios Papachristos =

Greek rower (born 1989)

Personal information
- Born: 26 January 1989 (age 37) Volos, Greece
Medal record
Men's rowing
Representing Greece
World Rowing Championships
Silver medal – second place	2010 Karapiro	M4-
Silver medal – second place	2011 Bled	M4-
European Rowing Championships
Gold medal – first place	2009 Brest	M4-
Gold medal – first place	2011 Plovdiv	M4-
Silver medal – second place	2010 Montemor-o-Velho	M4-

Stergios Papachristos (Greek: Στέργιος Παπαχρήστος, born 26 January 1989 in Volos) is a Greek rower.

He competed at the 2012 Summer Olympics in the men's four.

He was part of the Greek four that won the 2011 European Championship with Ioannis Tsilis, Georgios Tziallas and Ioannis Christou. This was the same team that won the silver medal at the 2011 World Championships. He was also part of the Greek men's four that won the silver at the 2010 World Championships, with Tsilis, Nikolaos Gkountoulas and Apostolos Gkountoulas. That team also won the silver at the 2010 European Championships. In 2009, he won gold in the men's four at the European Championships with Tziallas, Ioannis Tsamis and Pavlos Gavrilidis.
