= George Alexandru Pălămariu =

Romanian rower (born 1991)

Personal information
- Born: 17 March 1991 (age 35)

Sport
- Sport: Rowing

George Alexandru Pălămariu (born 17 March 1991, Lupeni) is a Romanian rower. He competed in the men's coxless four at the 2012 Summer Olympics and men's coxless pair event at the 2016 Summer Olympics.

== Career ==
Pălămariu was part of the junior Romanian men's four which finished in second at the 2008 World Championships and 2009 Junior World Championships.

In 2012, he was part of the Romanian team that won silver in the men's four at the European Championships, alongside Marius-Vasile Cozmiuc, Cristi-Ilie Pirghie and Florin Curuea. This was also the Romanian men's four team that participated at the 2012 Olympics. The team also won silver at the 2013 European Championships. Pălămariu was part of the Romanian U23 team that won the men's four at the 2013 U23 World Championship.

At the 2016 Olympics, Pălămariu partnered with Pirhgie in the men's coxless pair.
