= Tranquilli =

Tranquilli is a surname. Notable people with the surname include:

- Allison Tranquilli (born 1972) Australian basketballer
- Andrea Tranquilli (born 1986), Italian rower
- Andrew Tranquilli (born 1972), Australian rules footballer
- Silvano Tranquilli (1925–1997), Italian actor

== See also ==
- Ignazio Silone (1900–1978), Italian novelist born Secondino Tranquilli
