= Matyáš Klang =

Czech rower

Personal information
- Born: 7 June 1991 (age 35) Prague, the Czech Republic
- Height: 187 cm (6 ft 2 in)
- Weight: 93 kg (205 lb)

Sport
- Sport: Rowing
Medal record
Men's rowing
Representing the Czech Republic
European Rowing Championships
Silver medal – second place	2011 Plovdiv	Eight
Bronze medal – third place	2012 Varese	Eight

Matyáš Klang (born 7 June 1991) is a Czech rower. He competed at the 2012 Summer Olympics in London with the men's coxless four, where they came thirteenth. He was part of the Czech men's eight that won silver at the 2011 European Championships in Plovdiv, and bronze a year later in Varese.
