= Ioannis Christou =

Greek rower (born 1983)

Personal information
- Born: 23 June 1983 (age 43)
Medal record
Men's rowing
Representing Greece
World Championships
Silver medal – second place	2011 Bled	Coxless four
Bronze medal – third place	2010 Karapiro	Coxless pair
Mediterranean Games
Silver medal – second place	2005 Almería	Coxless pair
Gold medal – first place	2009 Pescara	Single Sculls
European Championships
Gold medal – first place	2007 Poznań	Double sculls
Gold medal – first place	2008 Marathon	Single sculls
Gold medal – first place	2010 Marathon	Men's pair
Gold medal – first place	2011 Marathon	Coxless four
Gold medal – first place	2012 Varese	Coxless four
Silver medal – second place	2009 Brest	Single sculls
Silver medal – second place	2014 Belgrade	Coxless four

Ioannis Christou (Greek: Ιωάννης Χρήστου; born 23 June 1983 in Kastoria) is a triple Olympian Greek rower, multiple Word and European Champion. He achieved 9 medals at World Cups in his career .He represented Greece at the 2008 Summer Olympics in the single sculls event, finishing in the 10th place.

At the 2012 Summer Olympics, he was part of the Greek coxless men's four, which finished fourth, four seconds behind the bronze medal-winning American four.

He was again part of the Greek coxless men's four team at the 2016 Summer Olympics, taking the eighth place.
