= Henrik Rummel =

American rower

Personal information
- Nationality: American
- Born: September 26, 1987 (age 38) Copenhagen, Denmark
- Height: 6 ft 5 in (196 cm)
Medal record
Men's rowing
Representing United States
Olympic Games
Bronze medal – third place	2012 London	Coxless four
World Championships
Gold medal – first place	2009 Poznań	M2+
Silver medal – second place	2014 Amsterdam	M4−
Bronze medal – third place	2013 Chungjiu	M4−

Henrik Rummel (born September 26, 1987 in Copenhagen) is an American rower. While attending Pittsford Mendon High School, Rummel rowed for Pittsford Crew on the Erie Canal in Pittsford, New York. He is a graduate of Harvard University.

During the 2012 Summer Olympics, he competed for the United States in the coxless four and won the bronze medal.
