= Scott Gault =

American rower

Personal information
- Full name: Scott Hunter Gault
- Born: January 31, 1983 (age 43) Berkeley, California, U.S.
Medal record
Men's rowing
Representing the United States
Olympic Games
Bronze medal – third place	2012 London	Coxless Four

Scott Hunter Gault (born January 31, 1983, in Berkeley, California) is an American rower. He won the bronze medal in the coxless four at the 2012 Summer Olympics, having finished in 5th place in the men's quadruple sculls at the 2008 Summer Olympics. He is a 2005 graduate of the University of Washington.
