= Glenn Ochal =

American rower

Personal information
- Born: March 1, 1986 (age 40) Philadelphia, Pennsylvania, U.S.

Sport
- Country: United States
- Sport: Men's rowing
- University team: Princeton University
- Club: Crescent Boat Club
Medal record
Olympic Games
Bronze medal – third place	2012 London	Coxless four

Glenn Ochal (born March 1, 1986) is an American rower. He won a bronze medal in the coxless four at the 2012 Summer Olympics. He competed in the men's eight at the 2016 Summer Olympics and finished fourth.

A native of the Philadelphia neighborhood of Roxborough, Ochal began rowing as a freshman at Roman Catholic High School. He was recruited for Princeton University's rowing team and was part of the crew which became the first collegiate team to win the Championship Eights at the Head of the Charles Regatta in twenty years. He currently works at Sparks Consulting, a social business that is concerned with rowing community development.

== See also ==
- List of Princeton University Olympians
