= Kyle Jones (triathlete) =

Canadian triathlete

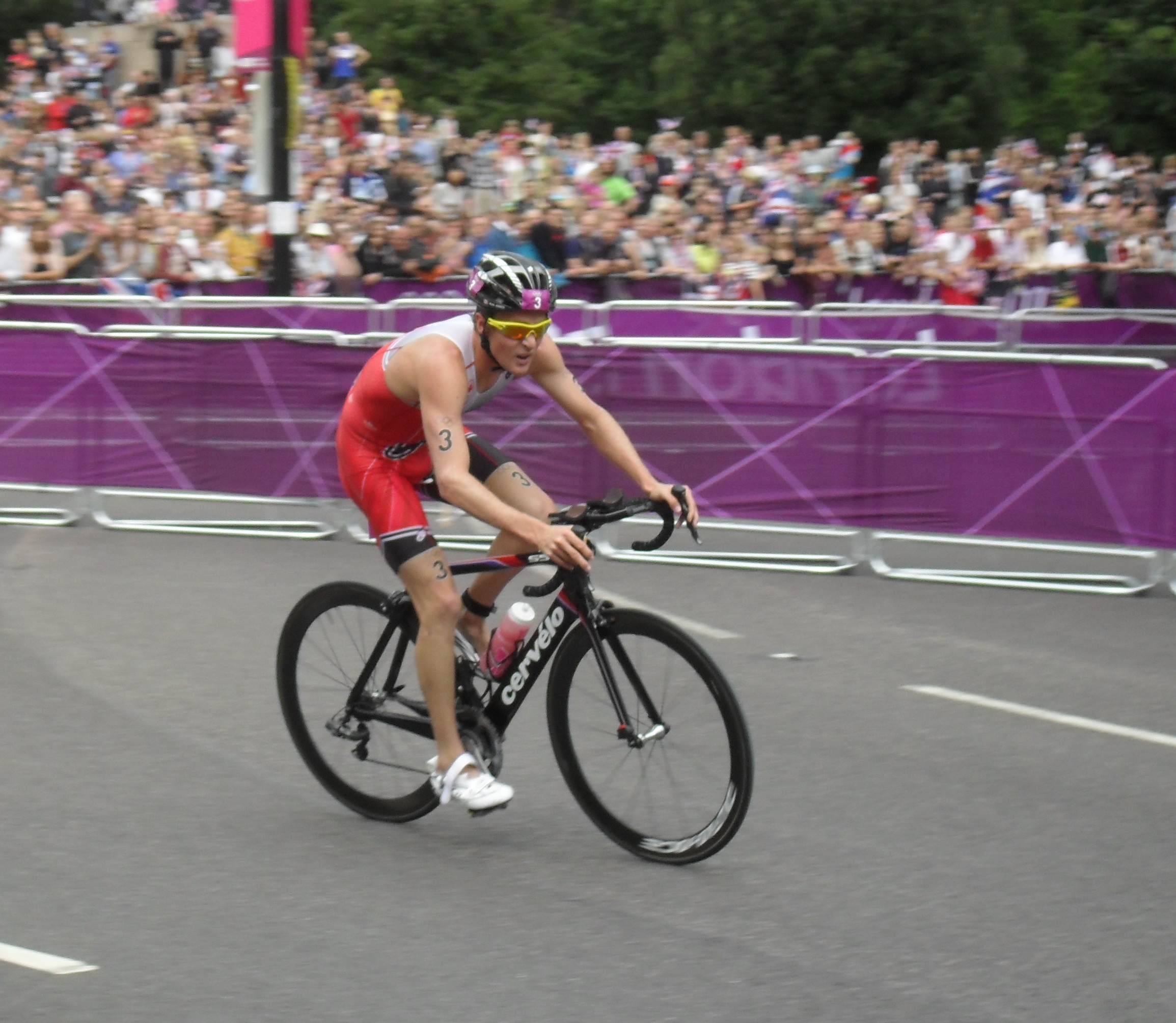
- Jones at the 2012 Olympics

Personal information
- Born: 15 November 1984 (age 40); Hamilton, Ontario, Canada

Sport
- Sport: Triathlon

Kyle Jones (born November 15, 1984) is an Olympian and former professional triathlete from Canada. He represented Canada at 13 World Championships and 5 Major Games competitions including the 2007, 2011 & 2015 Pan American Games, the 2014 Commonwealth Games and the 2012 Olympic Games in London. His career highlights include 3 National Championship titles, multiple ITU World Cup medals and a 6th-place finish at the 2012 ITU World Championship Grand Final in Auckland, New Zealand.

At the 2012 Summer Olympics men's triathlon, he placed 25th.

Now retired from competitive sport, Kyle enjoys life in the Niagara region of Ontario with his wife and two sons. He co-founded and operates EDGE Sport, offering a variety of sport based programs for youth and adult athletes in the Niagara region.

== Sporting career ==
Kyle was a member of Canada's National Triathlon Team from 2006 to 2016. He started participating in triathlon when he was 10, encouraged by his father. He won the Canadian Junior title in 2003 which sparked a move to Victoria, British Columbia, to train at the National Training Centre. He made his ITU World Cup debut in 2005. Kyle has narrowly missed the podium at two Pan American Games with 4th-place finishes in 2007 (Rio de Janeiro) and 2011 (Guadalajara). In 2008 Kyle was selected as the alternate for the Canadian Olympic Team. In 2012 he won his first Canadian Senior title, his first ITU World Cup title, and represented Canada at the Olympic Games in London. Since then, he has added two more National titles, three more World Cup medals (2 - silver, 1 - bronze), and represented Canada at the 2014 Commonwealth Games in Glasgow, Scotland and the 2015 Pan American Games in Toronto, Ontario, Canada.
