= Charlie Cole (rower) =

American rower (born 1986)

Personal information
- Born: June 21, 1986 (age 40) New York City, New York, U.S.
Medal record
Men's rowing
Representing the United States
Olympic Games
Bronze medal – third place	2012 London	Coxless four

Charles Cole (born June 21, 1986 in New York City, New York) is an American rower. He is a graduate of Yale and Kellogg College, Oxford, where he competed on the rowing team.

Charlie was USRowing's Athlete of the Year in 2011.

During the 2012 Summer Olympics, he competed in the Coxless Four and won a bronze medal.
