= Sean O'Neill (rower) =

Irish rower (born 1980)

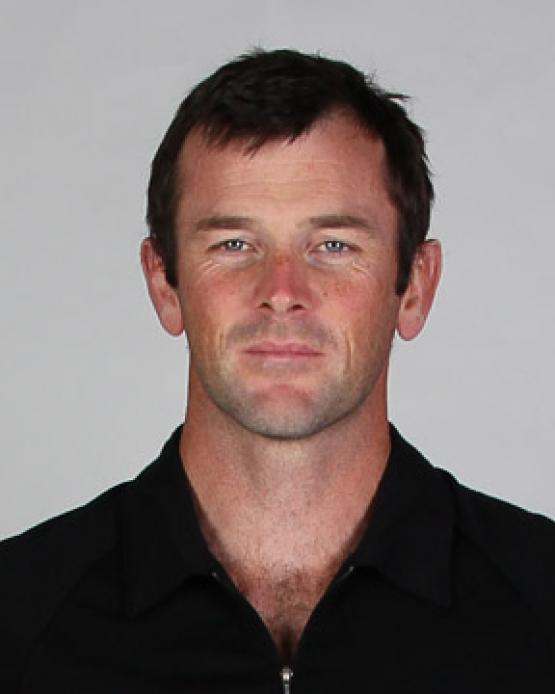

Personal information
- Nickname: Irish
- Nationality: Irish & New Zealand
- Born: 15 August 1980 (age 46) Limerick, Ireland
- Height: 192 cm (6 ft 4 in)

Sport
- Country: Ireland; New Zealand
- Sport: Rowing
- Club: St Michael's Rowing Club; Wairau Rowing Club
- Now coaching: Marlborough Girls' College

Sean O'Neill (born 15 August 1980 in Limerick) is an Irish rower from St Michael's Rowing Club. O'Neill started rowing while in New Zealand but returned to Ireland in 2008 to try to secure a place in an Irish crew. He competed for Ireland from 2006 to 2008. He returned to New Zealand in 2009 and competed for New Zealand from 2010 to 2012, after which he retired from international competition.

== Olympics ==
O'Neill competed in the men's coxless four at the 2008 Beijing Olympics for Ireland finishing in tenth place. He competed in the 2012 London Olympics in the men's coxless four for New Zealand finishing eleventh.

== Coaching ==
O'Neill is currently coaching a Marlborough Girls' College rowing team and has been since 2017. He has had a successful few years leading the girls to many medals and two bronze medals at the 2019 Aon Maadi Cup.
