= Miloš Vasić =

Serbian rower

Personal information
- Nationality: Serbian
- Born: 10 January 1991 (age 35) Loznica, Serbia, Yugoslavia
- Height: 1.95 m (6 ft 5 in)
- Weight: 85 kg (187 lb)
- Spouse: Sonja Vasić (m. 2019)

Sport
- Country: Serbia
- Sport: Rowing
- Event(s): Coxless pair, Coxless four
- Club: VK Partizan

Achievements and titles
- Olympic finals: Tokyo 2020 M2-
Medal record
Men's rowing
Representing Serbia
World Championships
Bronze medal – third place	2015 Aiguebelette	M2-
European Championships
Bronze medal – third place	2012 Varese	M4-
Bronze medal – third place	2015 Poznań	M2-
Bronze medal – third place	2017 Račice	M2-
Bronze medal – third place	2021 Varese	M2-
World Rowing Cup
Gold medal – first place	2019 Plovdiv	M2-
Gold medal – first place	2021 Lucerne	M2-
Silver medal – second place	2010 Bled	M4-
Silver medal – second place	2017 Belgrade	M2-
Silver medal – second place	2017 Poznań	M2-
Bronze medal – third place	2015 Lucerne	M2-
World U23 Championships
Bronze medal – third place	2013 Ottensheim	M2-

Miloš Vasić (Serbian Cyrillic: Милош Васић, born 10 January 1991) is a Serbian rower. He represented Serbia at the 2012 and 2016 Summer Olympics. He competed at the 2020 Summer Olympics in the men's coxless pair together with Martin Mačković and placed fifth.

He currently lives in Belgrade. He is a member of Rowing club Partizan.

== Results ==
=== Olympic games ===
- 2012 – Coxless four – 10th place
- 2016 – Coxless pair – 10th
- 2020 – Coxless pair – 5th

=== World Championships ===
- 2011 – Coxless four – 11th place
- 2013 – Coxless four – 11th
- 2014 – Coxless four – 9th
- 2015 – Coxless pair –
- 2017 – Coxless pair – 6th
- 2018 – Coxless pair – 9th
- 2019 – Coxless pair – 7th

=== European Championships ===
- 2010 – Coxless four – 6th place
- 2011 – Coxless four – 6th
- 2012 – Coxless four –
- 2013 – Coxless four – 7th
- 2014 – Single sculls – 11th
- 2015 – Coxless pair –
- 2016 – Coxless pair – 5th
- 2017 – Coxless pair –
- 2018 – Coxless pair – 4th
- 2019 – Coxless pair – 6th
- 2021 – Coxless pair –

=== World U23 Championships ===
- 2013 – Coxless pair –

=== World Junior Championships ===
- 2008 – Coxed four – 5th place
- 2009 – Single sculls – 6th

== Personal life ==
In July 2019, Vasić married Sonja Petrović, a professional basketball player and European champion and Olympic medalist with the Serbian national team.
