= Vadzim Lialin =

Belarusian rower

Personal information
- Born: 15 November 1982 (age 43)
Medal record
Men's rowing
Representing Belarus
European Championships
Gold medal – first place	2010 Montemor-o-Velho	M2+
Silver medal – second place	2011 Plovdiv	M4-
Silver medal – second place	2016 Brandenbrug	M4-
Bronze medal – third place	2007 Poznań	M8+
Bronze medal – third place	2008 Athens	M4-
Bronze medal – third place	2015 Poznan	M4-

Vadzim Lialin (born 15 November 1982) is a Belarusian rower. He won the silver medal in the coxless four at the 2016 European Rowing Championships.
