= Anthony Jacob =

Canadian rower

Personal information
- Nationality: Canadian
- Born: 18 May 1989 (age 35); Vancouver, British Columbia, Canada

Sport
- Sport: Rowing

Anthony Jacob (born 18 May 1989) is a Canadian rower. He competed in the men's coxless four event at the 2012 Summer Olympics.
