= Aliaksandr Kazubouski =

Belarusian rower

Personal information
- Nationality: Belarusian
- Born: 20 December 1981 (age 44) Pinsk, Belarus
- Education: Belarusian State University of Physical Training

Sport
- Sport: Rowing
Medal record
Gold medal – first place	2012 Plodviv	2000 m 2+
Gold medal – first place	2010 Montemor-o-Velho	2000 m 2+
Silver medal – second place	2011 Plodviv	2000 m 4-
Silver medal – second place	2007 Linz-Ottensheim	2000 m 8+
Silver medal – second place	2006 Poznan	2000 m 8+
Bronze medal – third place	2012 Munich	2000 m 4-
Bronze medal – third place	2012 Belgrade	2000 m 4-
Bronze medal – third place	2011 Hamburg	2000 m 4-
Bronze medal – third place	2008 Athens	2000 m 4-
Bronze medal – third place	2007 Poznan	2000 m 8+

Aliaksandr Kazubouski (born 20 December 1981) is a Belarusian rower. He competed at the 2008 Summer Olympics (placed 12th) and the 2012 Summer Olympics (placed 7th). Won the world title in 2012 World Rowing Championships in Plodviv, Bulgaria. Won the European Title in 2010 European Rowing Championships in Montemor-o-Velho, Portugal. In 2011 Kazubouski, as part of the team Dynamo Brest, competed in the Stewards' Challenge Cup at Henley Royal Regatta.

== Events ==
- 2019 World Indoor Rowing Championship - Long Beach, CA, USA (gold medal)
- 2019 C.R.A.S.H. -B. Sprints – Boston, MA, USA (silver medal)
- 2019 ERG Sprints – Alexandria, VA, USA (gold medal)

== Records ==
2019 Erg Sprints: set a record in 30 minute row among Masters (age 30–39)

== Personal life ==
Aliaksandr is married to Natallia Halapiatava, who is also a rower.
