= Andrea Tranquilli =

Italian male rower

Personal information
- National team: Italy
- Born: 5 February 1986 (age 40) Latina, Italy
- Height: 1.89 m (6 ft 2 in)
- Weight: 88 kg (194 lb)

Sport
- Sport: Rowing
- Club: G.S. Fiamme Gialle
- Start activity: 1996
Medal record
Event	1st	2nd	3rd
European Championships	0	2	0

Andrea Tranquilli (born 5 February 1986) is an Italian male rower, medal winner at senior level at the European Rowing Championships.
