= Tyson Williams =

New Zealand rower (born 1989)

Personal information
- Nationality: New Zealand
- Born: 1 April 1989 (age 36); Hamilton, New Zealand
- Height: 190 cm (6 ft 3 in)
- Weight: 90 kg (198 lb)

Tyson Williams (born 1 April 1989) is a New Zealand rower.

Williams was born in 1989 in Hamilton, New Zealand.

In 2007, he was part of the New Zealand men's eight that won silver at the Junior World Championship. In 2009, he was part of the New Zealand men's four that won the World Under 23 Championship, along with Jade Uru, Simon Watson and Hamish Burson.

He represented New Zealand at the 2012 Summer Olympics in the men's four with Uru, Sean O'Neill and Chris Harris. He is listed as New Zealand Olympian athlete number 1230 by the New Zealand Olympic Committee.
