= Gregor Hauffe =

German rower

Medal record

Men's rowing

Representing Germany

World Championships
Gold medal – first place	2009 Poznań	M8+
Gold medal – first place	2010 Karapiro	M8+
Gold medal – first place	2011 Bled	M8+

Gregor Hauffe (born 20 May 1982 in Magdeburg, East Germany) is a German former representative rower. He is a three time world champion and a dual Olympian. Hauffe competed at Beijing 2008 and London 2012 in the men's coxless four with both those crews making the Olympic final.
