= Toni Seifert =

German rower

Medal record

Men's rowing

Representing Germany

World Rowing Championships
Gold medal – first place	2009 Poznań	M8+
Gold medal – first place	2010 Karapiro	M8+
Silver medal – second place	2006 Eton	M4-

Toni Seifert (born 14 April 1981, in Dresden) is a German rower. As well as being a double world champion in the men's eight, he has twice competed for Germany at the Olympics in the men's coxless four.
