= Georgios Tziallas =

Greek rower (born 1987)

Medal record

Representing Greece

Men's rowing

World Championships
Silver medal – second place	2011 Bled	Coxless four
Bronze medal – third place	2010 Karapiro	Coxless pair

European Championships
Silver medal – second place	2014 Belgrade	Coxless four
Bronze medal – third place	2007 Poznań	Coxless four

Georgios Tziallas (Greek: Γεώργιος Τζιάλλας, born 14 July 1987 in Ioannina) is a Greek rower. He finished 4th in the men's coxless four at the 2012 Summer Olympics.

He was again part of the Greek coxless men's four team at the 2016 Summer Olympics, taking the eighth place.
