= Miljan Vuković =

Serbian rower

Medal record

Men's Rowing

Representing Serbia

European Championships
Bronze medal – third place	2012 Varese	Coxless four

Miljan Vuković (Serbian: Миљан Вуковић, born 10 January 1990 in Belgrade) is a Serbian rower. He represented Serbia at the 2012 Summer Olympics.

Vuković is a member of Partizan Rowing Club.

== Results ==
=== Olympic games ===
- 2012 - Coxless four - 10th place

=== World Championship ===
- 2011 - Coxless four - 11th place

=== European Championship ===
- 2010 - Coxless four - 6th place
- 2011 - Coxless four - 6th place
- 2012 - Coxless four -

=== World U23 Championship ===
- 2009 - Coxless fours - 9th place

=== World Junior Championship ===
- 2008 - Quadruple scull - 4th place
