= Radoje Đerić =

Serbian rower (born 1991)

Medal record

Men's Rowing

Representing Serbia

European Championships
| Bronze medal – third place | 2012 Varese | Coxless four |

World U23 Championships
| Bronze medal – third place | 2013 Ottensheim | Coxless pair |

Radoje Đerić (Serbian: Радоје Ђерић, born 28 December 1991 in Trebinje) is a Serbian rower. He represented Serbia at the 2012 Summer Olympics.

He is the older brother of rower Igor Đerić. He currently lives in Belgrade.

== Results ==
=== Olympic games ===
- 2012 - Coxless four - 10th place

=== World Championship ===
- 2011 - Coxless four - 11th place

=== European Championship ===
- 2010 - Coxless four - 6th place
- 2011 - Coxless four - 6th place
- 2012 - Coxless four -

=== World U23 Championships ===
- 2013 - Coxless pair -

=== World Junior Championship ===
- 2008 - Quadruple scull - 4th place
- 2009 - Double sculls - 5th place
