= Urs Käufer =

German rower (born 1984)

Medal record

Men's rowing

Representing Germany

World Rowing Championships
Gold medal – first place	2009 Poznań	M8+
Silver medal – second place	2006 Eton	M4-

Urs Käufer (born 17 November 1984 in Neu-Ulm) is a German former representative rower. He won a world championship title in 2009 in the German men's eight.
