= Florin Curuea =

Romanian rower

Personal information
- Nationality: Romanian
- Born: 18 December 1981 (age 43); Bucharest, Romania

Sport
- Sport: Rowing

Florin Curuea (born 18 December 1981) is a Romanian rower. He competed in the men's coxless four event at the 2012 Summer Olympics.
