= Derek O'Farrell =

Canadian rower

Medal record

Men's rowing

Representing Canada

World Rowing Championships
Silver medal – second place	2009 Poznań	Eight
Bronze medal – third place	2006 Dorney	Coxed pair
Bronze medal – third place	2007 Munich	Coxed pair

World Rowing U23 Championships
Bronze medal – third place	2005 Amsterdam	Eight

Derek O'Farrell (born 5 June 1983) is a Canadian rower.
