= Goran Jagar =

Serbian rower (born 1984)

Medal record

Men's rowing

Representing Serbia and Montenegro / Serbia

World Championships
Silver medal – second place	2007 Munich	Coxed four

European Championships
Gold medal – first place	2007 Poznań	Coxless pair
Silver medal – second place	2008 Marathon	Coxless pair
Silver medal – second place	2009 Brest	Coxless pair
Bronze medal – third place	2012 Varese	Coxless four

Mediterranean Games
Bronze medal – third place	2009 Pescara	Coxless pair

World Rowing U23 Championships
Gold medal – first place	2005 Amsterdam	Quad sculls

World Rowing Junior Championships
Silver medal – second place	2002 Trakai	Coxed pair

Goran Jagar (Serbian Cyrillic: Горан Јагар, born 10 June 1984 in Virovitica, SR Croatia, Yugoslavia) is a Serbian rower. He competed at the 2008 Summer Olympics and the 2012 Summer Olympics.
