= Cristi Ilie Pîrghie =

Romanian rower

Cristi-Ilie Pîrghie
Personal information
- Born: 20 July 1992 (age 33) Timișoara, Romania

Sport
- Country: Romania
- Sport: Rowing
Medal record
Men's rowing
Representing Romania
European Championships
Bronze medal – third place	2018 Glasgow	Eight

Cristi-Ilie Pîrghie (born 20 July 1992) is a Romanian rower. He competed in the men's coxless pair event at the 2016 Summer Olympics.
