= Michael Wilkinson (rower) =

Canadian rower (born 1986)

Michael Wilkinson (born May 9, 1986 in North Vancouver, British Columbia, Canada) is a Canadian rower. He competed in the men's coxless four at the 2012 Summer Olympics. His sister, Lauren, is also an Olympic rower and came in 2nd for the London Olympics in 2012, and in 5th for the Rio Olympics in 2016. .
