= 2018 World Rowing Championships – Men's coxless pair =

Men's coxless pair at the 2018 World Rowing Championships
- Venue: Plovdiv Regatta Venue
- Location: Plovdiv, Bulgaria
- Dates: 9–15 September
- Competitors: 51 from 25 nations
- Winning time: 6:14.96

Medalists
gold medal	Martin Sinković; Valent Sinković	Croatia
silver medal	Marius Cozmiuc; Ciprian Tudosă	Romania
bronze medal	Valentin Onfroy; Théophile Onfroy	France

The men's coxless pair competition at the 2018 World Rowing Championships in Plovdiv took place at the Plovdiv Regatta Venue.

== Schedule ==
The schedule was as follows:

Date	Time	Round
Sunday 9 September 2018	11:05	Heats
Monday 10 September 2018	12:25	Repechage
Thursday 13 September 2018	09:17	Quarterfinals
Thursday 13 September 2018	15:49	Semifinals C/D
Friday 14 September 2018	09:03	Semifinals A/B
Saturday 15 September 2018	09:46	Final B
Saturday 15 September 2018	11:46	Final A
Saturday 15 September 2018	14:53	Final C
Saturday 15 September 2018	15:41	Final D

All times are Eastern European Summer Time (UTC+3)

== Results ==
=== Heats ===
The four fastest boats in each heat advanced directly to the quarterfinals. The remaining boats were sent to the repechage.

==== Heat 1 ====
Rank	Rower	Country	Time	Notes
1	Marius Cozmiuc; Ciprian Tudosă	Romania	6:18.52	Q
2	Jaime Canalejo; Javier García	Spain	6:25.42	Q
3	Piotr Juszczak; Marcin Brzeziński	Poland	6:33.05	Q
4	Adrián Juhász; Béla Simon	Hungary	6:40.57	Q
5	Rodrigo Murillo; Francisco Esteras	Argentina	6:46.22	R

==== Heat 2 ====
Rank	Rower	Country	Time	Notes
1	Martin Sinković; Valent Sinković	Croatia	6:18.33	Q
2	Oliver Cook; Matthew Rossiter	Great Britain	6:22.74	Q
3	Joel Schürch; Mario Gyr	Switzerland	6:35.50	Q
4	Loui Lam; Lars Garvey	Denmark	6:42.44	Q
5	Rangel Katsarski; Stanimir Haladzhov	Bulgaria	7:10.67	R

==== Heat 3 ====
Rank	Rower	Country	Time	Notes
1	Miloš Vasić; Nenad Beđik	Serbia	6:23.70	Q
2	Lukáš Helešic; Jakub Podrazil	Czech Republic	6:26.66	Q
3	Cesare Gabbia; Vincenzo Abbagnale	Italy	6:28.45	Q
4	Roman Piven; Mykola Kalashnyk	Ukraine	6:30.40	Q
5	Xavier Vela; Willian Giaretton	Brazil	6:32.33	R

==== Heat 4 ====
Rank	Rower	Country	Time	Notes
1	Mackenzie Copp; Taylor Perry	Canada	6:20.46	Q
2	Jake Green; Lawrence Brittain	South Africa	6:21.85	Q
3	Valentin Onfroy; Théophile Onfroy	France	6:25.43	Q
4	Dzimitry Furman; Siarhei Valadzko	Belarus	6:28.22	Q
5	Mark O'Donovan; Shane O'Driscoll	Ireland	6:29.10	R

==== Heat 5 ====
Rank	Rower	Country	Time	Notes
1	Paul Schröter; Lauritis Follert	Germany	6:24.43	Q
2	Andrew Judge; Joseph O'Brien	Australia	6:26.02	Q
3	Tom Murray; Michael Brake	New Zealand	6:26.28	Q
4	Michael Colella; Anders Weiss	United States	6:29.25	Q
5	Sander de Graaf; Vincent Klaassens	Netherlands	6:32.03	R

=== Repechage ===
The four fastest boats advanced to the quarterfinals. The remaining boat took no further part in the competition.

Rank	Rower	Country	Time	Notes
1	Sander de Graaf; Vincent Klaassens	Netherlands	6:34.68	Q
2	Mark O'Donovan; Shane O'Driscoll	Ireland	6:36.29	Q
3	Xavier Vela; Willian Giaretton	Brazil	6:41.66	Q
4	Rangel Katsarski; Stanimir Haladzhov	Bulgaria	6:42.81	Q
5	Rodrigo Murillo; Francisco Esteras	Argentina	6:43.36	

=== Quarterfinals ===
The three fastest boats in each quarter advanced to the A/B semifinals. The remaining boats were sent to the C/D semifinals.

==== Quarterfinal 1 ====
Rank	Rowers	Country	Time	Notes
1	Marius Cozmiuc; Ciprian Tudosă	Romania	6:25.04	SA/B
2	Oliver Cook; Matthew Rossiter	Great Britain	6:25.24	SA/B
3	Dzimitry Furman; Siarhei Valadzko	Belarus	6:26.16	SA/B
4	Andrew Judge; Joseph O'Brien	Australia	6:27.34	SC/D
5	Xavier Vela; Willian Giaretton	Brazil	6:38.43	SC/D
6	Cesare Gabbia; Vincenzo Abbagnale	Italy	6:45.33	SC/D

==== Quarterfinal 2 ====
Rank	Rowers	Country	Time	Notes
1	Martin Sinković; Valent Sinković	Croatia	6:25.03	SA/B
2	Jaime Canalejo; Javier Garcia	Spain	6:28.54	SA/B
3	Jake Green; Lawrence Brittain	South Africa	6:30.28	SA/B
4	Michael Colella; Anders Weiss	United States	6:32.43	SC/D
5	Sander de Graaf; Vincent Klaassens	Netherlands	6:39.51	SC/D
6	Roman Piven; Mykola Kalashnyk	Ukraine	6:41.92	SC/D

==== Quarterfinal 3 ====
Rank	Rowers	Country	Time	Notes
1	Miloš Vasić; Nenad Beđik	Serbia	6:26.10	SA/B
2	Valentin Onfroy; Théophile Onfroy	France	6:27.17	SA/B
3	Adrián Juhász; Béla Simon	Hungary	6:33.05	SA/B
4	Joel Schürch; Mario Gyr	Switzerland	6:34.91	SC/D
5	Rangel Katsarski; Stanimir Haladzhov	Bulgaria	7:06.26	SC/D
6	Paul Schröter; Lauritis Follert	Germany	7:08.25	SC/D

==== Quarterfinal 4 ====
Rank	Rowers	Country	Time	Notes
1	Mackenzie Copp; Taylor Perry	Canada	6:26.04	SA/B
2	Tom Murray; Michael Brake	New Zealand	6:30.36	SA/B
3	Lukáš Helešic; Jakub Podrazil	Czech Republic	6:35.01	SA/B
4	Piotr Juszczak; Marcin Brzeziński	Poland	6:39.69	SC/D
5	Mark O'Donovan; Shane O'Driscoll	Ireland	6:44.28	SC/D
6	Loui Lam; Lars Garvey	Denmark	6:44.95	SC/D

=== Semifinals C/D ===
The three fastest boats in each semi were sent to the C final. The remaining boats were sent to the D final.

==== Semifinal 1 ====
Rank	Rowers	Country	Time	Notes
1	Andrew Judge; Joseph O'Brien	Australia	6:36.82	FC
2	Mark O'Donovan; Shane O'Driscoll	Ireland	6:38.74	FC
2	Cesare Gabbia; Vincenzo Abbagnale	Italy	6:38.74	FC
4	Sander de Graaf; Vincent Klaassens	Netherlands	6:38.78	FD
5	Lars Garvey; Loui Lam	Denmark	6:52.67	FD
6	Joel Schürch; Mario Gyr	Switzerland	6:58.90	FD

==== Semifinal 2 ====
Rank	Rowers	Country	Time	Notes
1	Michael Colella; Anders Weiss	United States	6:40.73	FC
2	Piotr Juszczak; Marcin Brzeziński	Poland	6:40.93	FC
3	Xavier Vela; Willian Giaretton	Brazil	6:43.45	FC
4	Roman Piven; Mykola Kalashnyk	Ukraine	6:46.44	FD
5	Rangel Katsarski; Stanimir Haladzhov	Bulgaria	7:18.01	FD
–	Paul Schröter; Eric Johannesen	Germany	DNS	–

=== Semifinals A/B ===
The three fastest boats in each semi advanced to the A final. The remaining boats were sent to the B final.

==== Semifinal 1 ====
Rank	Rowers	Country	Time	Notes
1	Marius Cozmiuc; Ciprian Tudosă	Romania	6:20.37	FA
2	Jaime Canalejo; Javier García	Spain	6:22.01	FA
3	Tom Murray; Michael Brake	New Zealand	6:22.20	FA
4	Miloš Vasić; Nenad Beđik	Serbia	6:23.71	FB
5	Lukáš Helešic; Jakub Podrazil	Czech Republic	6:37.03	FB
6	Dzimitry Furman; Siarhei Valadzko	Belarus	6:39.03	FB

==== Semifinal 2 ====
Rank	Rowers	Country	Time	Notes
1	Martin Sinković; Valent Sinković	Croatia	6:20.49	FA
2	Valentin Onfroy; Théophile Onfroy	France	6:21.59	FA
3	Mackenzie Copp; Taylor Perry	Canada	6:22.20	FA
4	Oliver Cook; Matthew Rossiter	Great Britain	6:24.40	FB
5	Jake Green; Lawrence Brittain	South Africa	6:29.42	FB
6	Adrián Juhász; Béla Simon	Hungary	6:46.30	FB

=== Finals ===
The A final determined the rankings for places 1 to 6. Additional rankings were determined in the other finals.

==== Final D ====
Rank	Rowers	Country	Time
1	Sander de Graaf; Vincent Klaassens	Netherlands	6:24.83
2	Roman Piven; Mykola Kalashnyk	Ukraine	6:28.39
3	Joel Schürch; Mario Gyr	Switzerland	6:31.27
4	Lars Garvey; Loui Lam	Denmark	6:32.86
5	Rangel Katsarski; Stanimir Haladzhov	Bulgaria	6:37.98

==== Final C ====
Rank	Rowers	Country	Time
1	Andrew Judge; Joseph O'Brien	Australia	6:23.81
2	Piotr Juszczak; Marcin Brzeziński	Poland	6:27.28
3	Michael Colella; Anders Weiss	United States	6:27.29
4	Mark O'Donovan; Shane O'Driscoll	Ireland	6:29.19
5	Xavier Vela; Willian Giaretton	Brazil	6:31.61
6	Cesare Gabbia; Vincenzo Abbagnale	Italy	6:47.79

==== Final B ====
Rank	Rowers	Country	Time
1	Lukáš Helešic; Jakub Podrazil	Czech Republic	6:29.14
2	Oliver Cook; Matthew Rossiter	Great Britain	6:30.25
3	Miloš Vasić; Nenad Beđik	Serbia	6:32.07
4	Jake Green; Lawrence Brittain	South Africa	6:32.35
5	Dzimitry Furman; Siarhei Valadzko	Belarus	6:32.38
6	Adrián Juhász; Béla Simon	Hungary	6:40.38

==== Final A ====
Rank	Rowers	Country	Time
1st place, gold medalist(s)	Martin Sinković; Valent Sinković	Croatia	6:14.96
2nd place, silver medalist(s)	Marius Cozmiuc; Ciprian Tudosă	Romania	6:16.90
3rd place, bronze medalist(s)	Valentin Onfroy; Théophile Onfroy	France	6:17.51
4	Mackenzie Copp; Taylor Perry	Canada	6:21.28
5	Tom Murray; Michael Brake	New Zealand	6:21.54
6	Jaime Canalejo; Javier García	Spain	6:25.12
