= 2017 World Rowing Championships – Men's coxless pair =

Men's coxless pair at the 2017 World Rowing Championships
- Venue: Nathan Benderson Park
- Location: Sarasota, United States
- Dates: 24–30 September
- Competitors: 36 from 18 nations
- Winning time: 6:16.22

Medalists
| gold medal | Matteo Lodo; Giuseppe Vicino | Italy |
| silver medal | Martin Sinković; Valent Sinković | Croatia |
| bronze medal | Tom Murray; James Hunter | New Zealand |

The men's coxless pair competition at the 2017 World Rowing Championships in Sarasota took place in Nathan Benderson Park.

== Schedule ==
The schedule was as follows:

| Date | Time | Round |
|---|---|---|
| Sunday 24 September 2017 | 11:06 | Heats |
| Tuesday 26 September 2017 | 12:24 | Repechages |
| Thursday 28 September 2017 | 11:31 | Semifinals A/B |
| Friday 29 September 2017 | 13:50 | Final C |
| Saturday 30 September 2017 | 09:05 | Final B |
| Saturday 30 September 2017 | 10:38 | Final A |

All times are Eastern Daylight Time (UTC-4)

== Results ==
=== Heats ===
The two fastest boats in each heat advanced directly to the A/B semifinals. The remaining boats were sent to the repechages.

==== Heat 1 ====
| Rank | Rowers | Country | Time | Notes |
|---|---|---|---|---|
| 1 | Matteo Lodo; Giuseppe Vicino | Italy | 6:27.88 | SA/B |
| 2 | Valentin Onfroy; Théophile Onfroy | France | 6:33.03 | SA/B |
| 3 | Àlex Sigurbjörnsson; Pau Vela | Spain | 6:39.93 | R |
| 4 | Leo Victor Davis; Sandro Torrente | South Africa | 6:43.62 | R |
| 5 | Lex van den Herik; Bo Wullings | Netherlands | 6:50.27 | R |
| 6 | Fionnan McQuillan-Tolan; Patrick Boomer | Ireland | 6:50.82 | R |

==== Heat 2 ====
| Rank | Rowers | Country | Time | Notes |
|---|---|---|---|---|
| 1 | Martin Sinković; Valent Sinković | Croatia | 6:22.97 | SA/B |
| 2 | Dzimitry Furman; Siarhei Valadzko | Belarus | 6:32.56 | SA/B |
| 3 | Nenad Beđik; Miloš Vasić | Serbia | 6:37.99 | R |
| 4 | Besim Şahinoğlu; Onat Kazakli | Turkey | 6:40.33 | R |
| 5 | Christoffer Kruse; Peter Holmquist | Denmark | 6:41.04 | R |
| 6 | Zhao Meng; Sun Lu | China | 6:57.57 | R |

==== Heat 3 ====
| Rank | Rowers | Country | Time | Notes |
|---|---|---|---|---|
| 1 | Tom Murray; James Hunter | New Zealand | 6:24.49 | SA/B |
| 2 | Tom Jeffery; Thomas George | Great Britain | 6:27.89 | SA/B |
| 3 | Vlad Dragoș Aicoboae; Cosmin Pascari | Romania | 6:34.35 | R |
| 4 | Michael Colella; Anders Weiss | United States | 6:39.34 | R |
| 5 | Jakub Podrazil; Lukáš Helešic | Czech Republic | 6:40.25 | R |
| 6 | Francisco Esteras; Axek Haack | Argentina | 6:42.31 | R |

=== Repechages ===
The three fastest boats in each repechage advanced to the A/B semifinals. The remaining boats were sent to the C final.

==== Repechage 1 ====
| Rank | Rowers | Country | Time | Notes |
|---|---|---|---|---|
| 1 | Nenad Beđik; Miloš Vasić | Serbia | 6:38.05 | SA/B |
| 2 | Àlex Sigurbjörnsson; Pau Vela | Spain | 6:40.24 | SA/B |
| 3 | Michael Colella; Anders Weiss | United States | 6:41.46 | SA/B |
| 4 | Francisco Esteras; Axek Haack | Argentina | 6:41.81 | FC |
| 5 | Fionnan McQuillan-Tolan; Patrick Boomer | Ireland | 6:47.01 | FC |
| 6 | Christoffer Kruse; Peter Holmquist | Denmark | 6:50.36 | FC |

==== Repechage 2 ====
| Rank | Rowers | Country | Time | Notes |
|---|---|---|---|---|
| 1 | Vlad Dragoș Aicoboae; Cosmin Pascari | Romania | 6:34.01 | SA/B |
| 2 | Jakub Podrazil; Lukáš Helešic | Czech Republic | 6:36.07 | SA/B |
| 3 | Besim Şahinoğlu; Onat Kazakli | Turkey | 6:37.42 | SA/B |
| 4 | Lex van den Herik; Bo Wullings | Netherlands | 6:40.71 | FC |
| 5 | Leo Victor Davis; Sandro Torrente | South Africa | 6:42.68 | FC |
| 6 | Zhao Meng; Sun Lu | China | 6:54.62 | FC |

=== Semifinals ===
The three fastest boats in each semi advanced to the A final. The remaining boats were sent to the B final.

==== Semifinal 1 ====
| Rank | Rowers | Country | Time | Notes |
|---|---|---|---|---|
| 1 | Matteo Lodo; Giuseppe Vicino | Italy | 6:26.36 | FA |
| 2 | Tom Murray; James Hunter | New Zealand | 6:27.81 | FA |
| 3 | Nenad Beđik; Miloš Vasić | Serbia | 6:36.21 | FA |
| 4 | Jakub Podrazil; Lukáš Helešic | Czech Republic | 6:42.33 | FB |
| 5 | Michael Colella; Anders Weiss | United States | 6:48.12 | FB |
| 6 | Dzimitry Furman; Siarhei Valadzko | Belarus | 7:01.08 | FB |

==== Semifinal 2 ====
| Rank | Rowers | Country | Time | Notes |
|---|---|---|---|---|
| 1 | Martin Sinković; Valent Sinković | Croatia | 6:25.96 | FA |
| 2 | Tom Jeffery; Thomas George | Great Britain | 6:28.63 | FA |
| 3 | Valentin Onfroy; Théophile Onfroy | France | 6:29.34 | FA |
| 4 | Vlad Dragoș Aicoboae; Cosmin Pascari | Romania | 6:30.83 | FB |
| 5 | Àlex Sigurbjörnsson; Pau Vela | Spain | 6:40.42 | FB |
| 6 | Besim Şahinoğlu; Onat Kazakli | Turkey | 7:18.22 | FB |

=== Finals ===
The A final determined the rankings for places 1 to 6. Additional rankings were determined in the other finals.

==== Final C ====
| Rank | Rowers | Country | Time |
|---|---|---|---|
| 1 | Lex van den Herik; Bo Wullings | Netherlands | 6:37.07 |
| 2 | Leo Victor Davis; Sandro Torrente | South Africa | 6:38.38 |
| 3 | Francisco Esteras; Axek Haack | Argentina | 6:42.58 |
| 4 | Fionnan McQuillan-Tolan; Patrick Boomer | Ireland | 6:43.24 |
| 5 | Christoffer Kruse; Peter Holmquist | Denmark | 6:45.34 |
| 6 | Zhao Meng; Sun Lu | China | 6:58.26 |

==== Final B ====
| Rank | Rowers | Country | Time |
|---|---|---|---|
| 1 | Vlad Dragoș Aicoboae; Cosmin Pascari | Romania | 6:26.30 |
| 2 | Jakub Podrazil; Lukáš Helešic | Czech Republic | 6:28.66 |
| 3 | Àlex Sigurbjörnsson; Pau Vela | Spain | 6:29.46 |
| 4 | Dzimitry Furman; Siarhei Valadzko | Belarus | 6:29.47 |
| 5 | Michael Colella; Anders Weiss | United States | 6:31.34 |
| 6 | Besim Şahinoğlu; Onat Kazakli | Turkey | 6:32.33 |

==== Final A ====
| Rank | Rowers | Country | Time |
|---|---|---|---|
| 1st place, gold medalist(s) | Matteo Lodo; Giuseppe Vicino | Italy | 6:16.22 |
| 2nd place, silver medalist(s) | Martin Sinković; Valent Sinković | Croatia | 6:16.56 |
| 3rd place, bronze medalist(s) | Tom Murray; James Hunter | New Zealand | 6:20.85 |
| 4 | Valentin Onfroy; Théophile Onfroy | France | 6:26.26 |
| 5 | Tom Jeffery; Thomas George | Great Britain | 6:31.19 |
| 6 | Nenad Beđik; Miloš Vasić | Serbia | 6:37.89 |
