= Rowing at the 2016 Summer Olympics – Men's coxless pair =

Men's coxless pair at the Games of the XXXI Olympiad
- Venue: Rodrigo de Freitas Lagoon
- Date: 6–11 August 2016
- Competitors: 26 from 13 nations
- Winning time: 6:59.71

Medalists
1st place, gold medalist(s)		Eric Murray; Hamish Bond	New Zealand
2nd place, silver medalist(s)		Lawrence Brittain; Shaun Keeling	South Africa
3rd place, bronze medalist(s)		Giovanni Abagnale; Marco Di Costanzo	Italy

The men's coxless pair competition at the 2016 Summer Olympics in Rio de Janeiro was held from 6 to 11 August at the Lagoon Rodrigo de Freitas.

The medals for the competition were presented by Barry Maister, New Zealand, member of the International Olympic Committee, and the gifts were presented by Jean-Christophe Rolland, France, President of the International Rowing Federation.

== Results ==
=== Heats ===
First three of each heat qualify to the semifinals, remainder goes to the repechage.

==== Heat 1 ====
Rank	Rower	Country	Time	Notes
1	Spencer Turrin; Alexander Lloyd	Australia	6:40.79	SF
2	Lawrence Brittain; Shaun Keeling	South Africa	6:41.42	SF
3	Jakub Podrazil; Lukáš Helešic	Czech Republic	6:42.710	SF
4	Anders Weiss; Nareg Guregian	United States	6:49.97	R
5	Àlex Sigurbjörnsson; Pau Vela	Spain	6:54.26	R

==== Heat 2 ====
Rank	Rower	Country	Time	Notes
1	Germain Chardin; Dorian Mortelette	France	6:42.00	SF
2	Alan Sinclair; Stewart Innes	Great Britain	6:50.77	SF
3	Cristi-Ilie Pârghie; George Alexandru Pălămariu	Romania	6:51.71	SF
4	Roel Braas; Mitchel Steenman	Netherlands	7:22.93	R

==== Heat 3 ====
Many of the competitors criticised that the regatta was not called off due to the challenging conditions. Miloš Vasić and Nenad Beđik capsized and did not get back into the boat, but the International Rowing Federation (FISA) ruled that despite their DNF they could compete in the repechage.

Rank	Rower	Country	Time	Notes
1	Eric Murray; Hamish Bond	New Zealand	6:41.75	SF
2	Giovanni Abagnale; Marco Di Costanzo	Italy	6:46.04	SF
3	Adrián Juhász; Béla Simon	Hungary	6:59.28	SF
4	Miloš Vasić; Nenad Beđik	Serbia	DNF (capsized)	R

=== Repechage ===
First three of heat qualify to the semifinals.

Rank	Rower	Country	Time	Notes
1	Roel Braas; Mitchel Steenman	Netherlands	6:34.16	SF
2	Miloš Vasić; Nenad Beđik	Serbia	6:34.52	SF
3	Anders Weiss; Nareg Guregian	United States	6:36.60	SF
4	Àlex Sigurbjörnsson; Pau Vela	Spain	6:40.47	

=== Semifinals ===
First three of each heat qualify to the Final A, remainder goes to the Final B.

==== Semifinal 1 ====
Rank	Rower	Country	Time	Notes
1	Giovanni Abagnale; Marco Di Costanzo	Italy	6:24.96	FA
2	Spencer Turrin; Alexander Lloyd	Australia	6:25.25	FA
3	Germain Chardin; Dorian Mortelette	France	6:26.10	FA
4	Roel Braas; Mitchel Steenman	Netherlands	6:26.94	FB
5	Anders Weiss; Nareg Guregian	United States	6:33.95	FB
6	Cristi-Ilie Pârghie; George Alexandru Pălămariu	Romania	6:48.17	FB

==== Semifinal 2 ====
Rank	Rower	Country	Time	Notes
1	Eric Murray; Hamish Bond	New Zealand	6:23.36	FA
2	Alan Sinclair; Stewart Innes	Great Britain	6:26.37	FA
3	Lawrence Brittain; Shaun Keeling	South Africa	6:27.59	FA
4	Adrián Juhász; Béla Simon	Hungary	6:29.12	FB
5	Miloš Vasić; Nenad Beđik	Serbia	6:31.00	FB
6	Jakub Podrazil; Lukáš Helešic	Czech Republic	6:32.85	FB

=== Final ===
==== Final B ====
Rank	Rower	Country	Time	Notes
1	Jakub Podrazil; Lukáš Helešic	Czech Republic	7:00.04	
2	Roel Braas; Mitchel Steenman	Netherlands	7:01.88	
3	Adrián Juhász; Béla Simon	Hungary	7:03.34	
4	Miloš Vasić; Nenad Beđik	Serbia	7:04.71	
5	Anders Weiss; Nareg Guregian	United States	7:10.60	
6	Cristi-Ilie Pârghie; George Alexandru Pălămariu	Romania	7:13.68	

==== Final A ====
Rank	Rower	Country	Time	Notes
1st place, gold medalist(s)	Eric Murray; Hamish Bond	New Zealand	6:59.71	
2nd place, silver medalist(s)	Lawrence Brittain; Shaun Keeling	South Africa	7:02.51	
3rd place, bronze medalist(s)	Giovanni Abagnale; Marco Di Costanzo	Italy	7:04.52	
4	Alan Sinclair; Stewart Innes	Great Britain	7:07.99	
5	Germain Chardin; Dorian Mortelette	France	7:09.91	
6	Spencer Turrin; Alexander Lloyd	Australia	7:11.60	
