= Rowing at the 2012 Summer Olympics – Men's coxless pair =

Men's coxless pair at the Games of the XXX Olympiad
- Venue: Eton Dorney
- Date: 28 July – 3 August 2012
- Competitors: 26 from 13 nations
- Winning time: 6:16.65

Medalists
| 1st place, gold medalist(s) | | Eric Murray; Hamish Bond | New Zealand |
| 2nd place, silver medalist(s) | | Germain Chardin; Dorian Mortelette | France |
| 3rd place, bronze medalist(s) | | George Nash; Will Satch | Great Britain |

The Men's coxless pair competition at the 2012 Summer Olympics in London took place are at Dorney Lake which, for the purposes of the Games venue, is officially termed Eton Dorney.

== Competition format ==
The format of the competition was determined by how many boats are competing as at the entry deadline at the beginning of July.

With 13 boats in with heats, the best boats qualify directly for the semi-finals. All other boats progress to the repechage round, which offers a second chance to qualify for the semi-finals. The best three boats in each of the two semi-finals qualify for final A, which determines places 1–6 (including the medals). Unsuccessful boats from semi-finals A/B go forward to final B, which determines places 7–12.

== Schedule ==
All times are British Summer Time (UTC+1)

| Date | Time | Round |
|---|---|---|
| Saturday, 28 July 2012 | 12:00 | Heats |
| Monday, 30 July 2012 | 10:10 | Repechage |
| Wednesday, 1 August 2012 | 11:00 | Semifinals |
| Friday, 3 August 2012 | 10:20 | Final B |
| Friday, 3 August 2012 | 11:50 | Final |

== Results ==
=== Heats ===
First three of each heat qualify for the semifinals, remainder go to repeachge.

==== Heat 1 ====
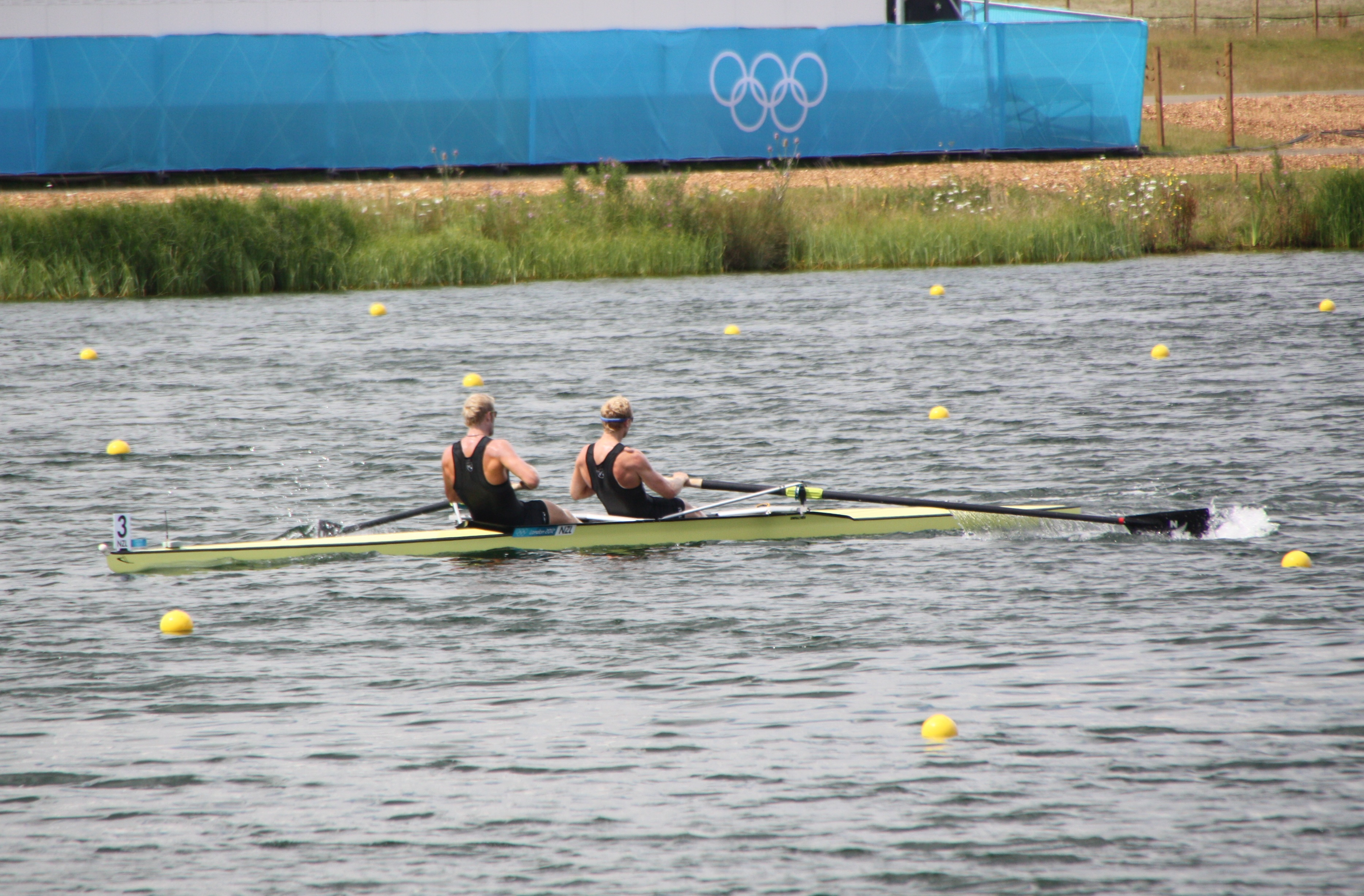
Bond and Murray at the London Olympics

| Rank | Rowers | Country | Time | Notes |
|---|---|---|---|---|
| 1 | Eric Murray; Hamish Bond | New Zealand | 6:08.50 | Q (OB, WB) |
| 2 | Germain Chardin; Dorian Mortelette | France | 6:17.22 | Q |
| 3 | Wojciech Gutorski; Jarosław Godek | Poland | 6:19.98 | Q |
| 4 | Nenad Beđik; Nikola Stojić | Serbia | 6:23.87 | R |
| 5 | Domonkos Széll; Béla Simon | Hungary | 6:46.18 | R |

==== Heat 2 ====
| Rank | Rowers | Country | Time | Notes |
|---|---|---|---|---|
| 1 | David Calder; Scott Frandsen | Canada | 6:23.80 | Q |
| 2 | James Marburg; Brodie Buckland | Australia | 6:24.83 | Q |
| 3 | Nanne Sluis; Meindert Klem | Netherlands | 6:25.59 | Q |
| 4 | Thomas Peszek; Silas Stafford | United States | 6:26.59 | R |

==== Heat 3 ====
| Rank | Rowers | Country | Time | Notes |
|---|---|---|---|---|
| 1 | George Nash; Will Satch | Great Britain | 6:16.58 | Q |
| 2 | Niccolò Mornati; Lorenzo Carboncini | Italy | 6:18.33 | Q |
| 3 | Nikolaos Gkountoulas; Apostolos Gkountoulas | Greece | 6:21.46 | Q |
| 4 | Anton Braun; Felix Drahotta | Germany | 6:30.42 | R |

=== Repechage ===
First three qualify to the semifinals.

| Rank | Rowers | Country | Time | Notes |
|---|---|---|---|---|
| 1 | Anton Braun; Felix Drahotta | Germany | 6:22.76 | Q |
| 2 | Nenad Beđik; Nikola Stojić | Serbia | 6:26.61 | Q |
| 3 | Thomas Peszek; Silas Stafford | United States | 6:27.41 | Q |
| 4 | Domonkos Széll; Béla Simon | Hungary | 6:27.88 | |

=== Semifinals ===
First three qualify to Final A, remainder to Final B.

==== Semifinal 1 ====
| Rank | Rowers | Country | Time | Notes |
|---|---|---|---|---|
| 1 | Eric Murray; Hamish Bond | New Zealand | 6:48.11 | Q |
| 2 | Niccolò Mornati; Lorenzo Carboncini | Italy | 6:55.82 | Q |
| 3 | David Calder; Scott Frandsen | Canada | 6:56.47 | Q |
| 4 | Thomas Peszek; Silas Stafford | United States | 6:58.58 | |
| 5 | Anton Braun; Felix Drahotta | Germany | 7:02.16 | |
| 6 | Nanne Sluis; Meindert Klem | Netherlands | 7:13.77 | |

==== Semifinal 2 ====
| Rank | Rowers | Country | Time | Notes |
|---|---|---|---|---|
| 1 | George Nash; Will Satch | Great Britain | 6:56.46 | Q |
| 2 | Germain Chardin; Dorian Mortelette | France | 6:58.67 | Q |
| 3 | James Marburg; Brodie Buckland | Australia | 7:02.12 | Q |
| 4 | Wojciech Gutorski; Jarosław Godek | Poland | 7:04.58 | |
| 5 | Nikolaos Gkountoulas; Apostolos Gkountoulas | Greece | 7:07.15 | |
| 6 | Nenad Beđik; Nikola Stojić | Serbia | 7:07.78 | |

=== Finals ===
==== Final B ====
| Rank | Rowers | Country | Time | Notes |
|---|---|---|---|---|
| 1 | Anton Braun; Felix Drahotta | Germany | 6:49.93 | |
| 2 | Thomas Peszek; Silas Stafford | United States | 6:53.30 | |
| 3 | Nikolaos Gkountoulas; Apostolos Gkountoulas | Greece | 6:53.69 | |
| 4 | Wojciech Gutorski; Jarosław Godek | Poland | 6:56.00 | |
| 5 | Nanne Sluis; Meindert Klem | Netherlands | 7:05.12 | |
| – | Nenad Beđik; Nikola Stojić | Serbia | | DNS |

==== Final A ====
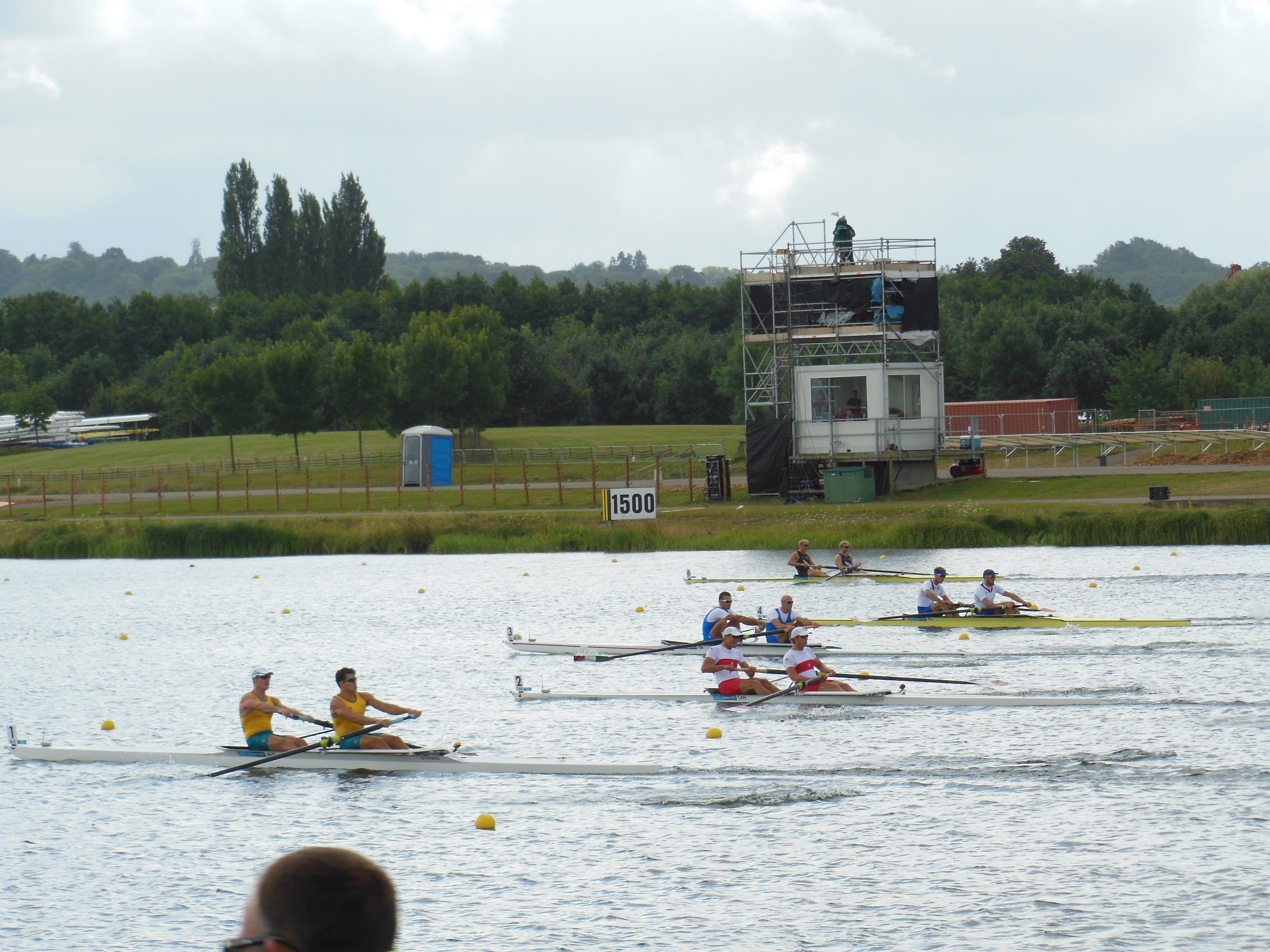
The final at 1500 m

| Rank | Rowers | Country | Time | Notes |
|---|---|---|---|---|
| 1st place, gold medalist(s) | Eric Murray; Hamish Bond | New Zealand | 6:16.65 | |
| 2nd place, silver medalist(s) | Germain Chardin; Dorian Mortelette | France | 6:21.11 | |
| 3rd place, bronze medalist(s) | George Nash; Will Satch | Great Britain | 6:21.77 | |
| 4 | Niccolò Mornati; Lorenzo Carboncini | Italy | 6:26.17 | |
| 5 | James Marburg; Brodie Buckland | Australia | 6:29.28 | |
| 6 | David Calder; Scott Frandsen | Canada | 6:30.49 | |
