= Onfroy =

Onfroy is a surname of French origin and a variant of Humphrey. Notable people with the surname include:

- Jahseh Onfroy (1998–2018), American rapper known professionally as XXXTentacion
- Théophile Onfroy (born 1992), French rower
- Valentin Onfroy (born 1993), French rower
