= Rowing at the 2013 Mediterranean Games – Men's coxless pair =

The men's lightweight single sculls rowing event at the 2013 Mediterranean Games will be held from June 21–23 at the Seyhan Dam in Adana.

== Schedule ==
All times are Eastern European Summer Time (UTC+3).

| Date | Time | Round |
|---|---|---|
| June 21, 2013 | 09:50 | Heats |
| June 23, 2013 | 09:45 | Final A |

== Results ==
=== Heat 1 ===
| Rank | Rowers | Country | Time | Notes |
|---|---|---|---|---|
| 1 | Nikola Stojić; Nenad Beđik | Serbia | 6:34.74 | FA |
| 2 | Marco Di Costanzo; Matteo Castaldo | Italy | 6:35.54 | FA |
| 3 | Pau Vela; Alexander Sigurbjörnsson | Spain | 6:38.16 | FA |
| 4 | Selahattin Gursoy; Muhammed Cansi | Turkey | 6:47.79 | FA |
| 5 | Kamal Mostafa; Mahmoud Ibrahim Zahran | Egypt | 7:31.78 | FA |
