= 2009 European Rowing Championships =

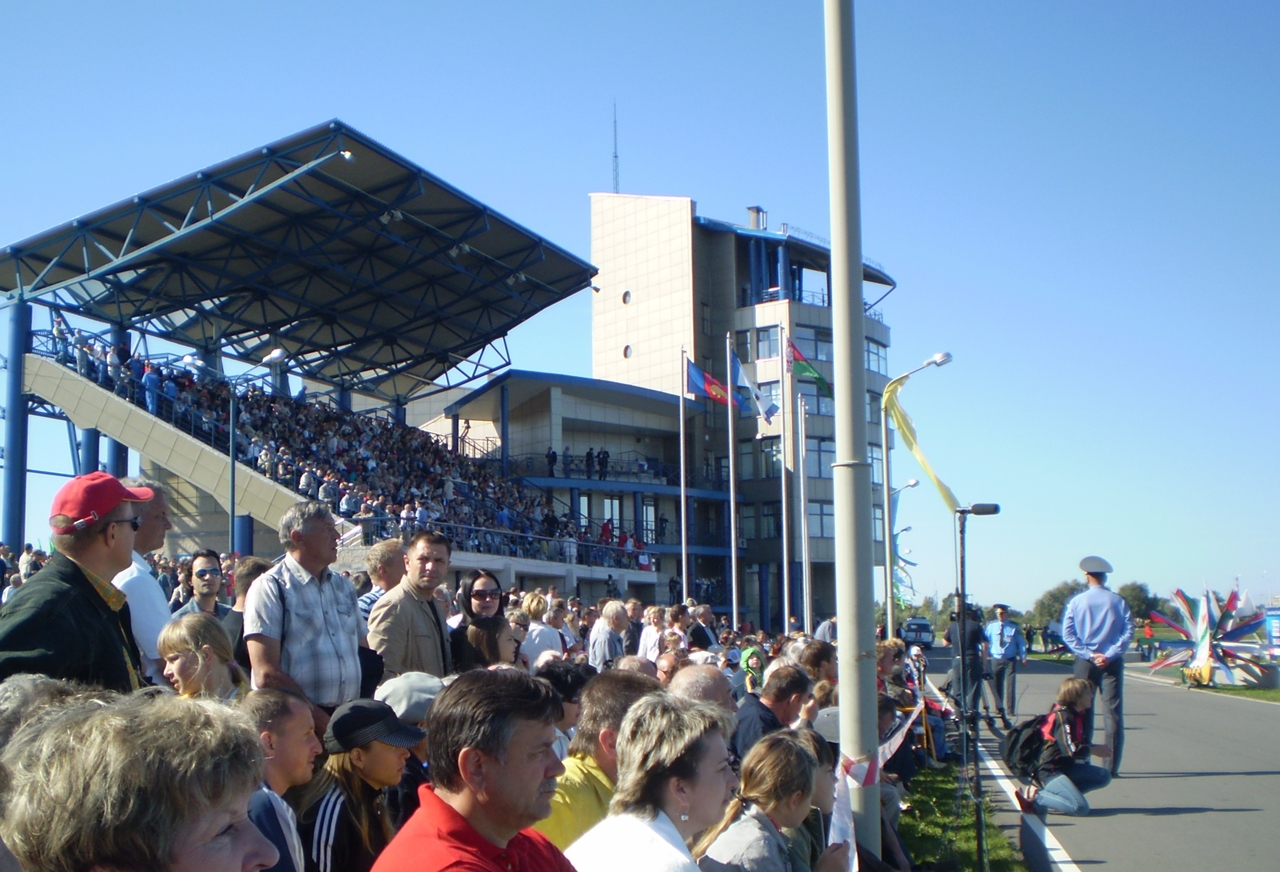
- Spectators at the 2009 European Rowing Championships
- Location: Brest, Belarus
- Dates: 18–20 September 2009

The 2009 European Rowing Championships were held in Brest, Belarus, from 18 to 20 September 2009. They were the third European Rowing Championships after the decision was made in May 2006 by the FISA to re-establish them.

== Medal summary ==
=== Men ===
Event	Gold	Time	Silver	Time	Bronze	Time
M1x	Mindaugas Griskonis (LTU)	7:03.05	Ioannis Christou (GRE)	7:06.61	Mario Vekić (CRO)	7:08.64
LM2x	Greece (GRE); Dimitrios Mouyios; Vasileios Polymeros	6:28.21	Italy (ITA); Lorenzo Bertini; Elia Luini	6:31.45	France (FRA); Pierre-Étienne Pollez; Maxime Goisset	6:33.86
M2x	Estonia (EST); Allar Raja; Kaspar Taimsoo	6:28.82	Switzerland (SUI); André Vonarburg; Florian Stofer	6:30.87	Serbia (SRB); Marko Marjanović; Dušan Bogičević	6:36.85
M2-	Greece (GRE); Apostolos Goudoulas; Nikolaos Goudoulas	6:45.08	Serbia (SRB); Nikola Stojić; Goran Jagar	6:48.53	France (FRA); Laurent Cadot; Jean-David Bernard	6:52.34
M4x	Ukraine (UKR); Hennadiy Zakharchenko; Volodymyr Pavlovskiy; Kostyantyn Zaytsev; Serhiy Hryn	5:53.12	Belarus (BLR); Valery Radzevich; Kiryl Lemiashkevich; Stanislau Shcharbachenia; Dzianis Mihal	5:54.44	Poland (POL); Arnold Sobczak; Piotr Licznerski; Michał Słoma; Wiktor Chabel	5:55.09
LM4-	France (FRA); Jean-Christophe Bette; Fabien Tilliet; Franck Solforosi; Fabrice Moreau	6:04.85	Germany (GER); Matthias Schömann-Finck; Jost Schömann-Finck; Jochen Kühner; Martin Kühner	6:05.56	Serbia (SRB); Nemanja Nešić; Miloš Stanojević; Nenad Babović; Miloš Tomić	6:06.88
M4-	Greece (GRE); Ioannis Tsamis; Stergios Papachristos; Georgios Tziallas; Pavlos Gavriilidis	6:06.84	Czech Republic (CZE); Jan Gruber; Jakub Makovička; Milan Bruncvík; Michal Horváth	6:07.45	Spain (ESP); Pedro Rodríguez Aragón; Pau Vela Maggi; Marcelino García Cortes; Noe Guzmán del Castillo	6:09.74
M8+	Poland (POL); Patryk Brzeziński; Jarosław Godek; Michał Szpakowski; Krystian Aranowski; Piotr Hojka; Marcin Brzeziński; Wojciech Gutorski; Mikołaj Burda; Daniel Trojanowski	5:43.80	Ukraine (UKR); Andriy Pryveda; Serhiy Bazylyev; Anton Kholyaznykov; Valentyn Kletskoy; Andrii Iakymchuk; Dmytro Prokopenko; Andriy Shpak; Sergiy Chykanov; Oleksandr Konovaliuk	5:45.66	France (FRA); Julien Desprès; Adrien Hardy; Pierre-Jean Peltier; Jean-Baptiste Macquet; Germain Chardin; Benjamin Rondeau; Sebastien Lente; Dorian Mortelette; Benjamin Manceau	5:47.50

=== Women ===
Event	Gold	Time	Silver	Time	Bronze	Time
W1x	Ekaterina Karsten (BLR)	7:40.02	Miroslava Knapková (CZE)	7:43.79	Yuliya Levina (RUS)	7:51.15
LW2x	Greece (GRE); Christina Giazitzidou; Alexandra Tsiavou	7:15.26	Poland (POL); Magdalena Kemnitz; Agnieszka Renc	7:19.69	Austria (AUT); Stefanie Borzacchini; Michaela Taupe-Traer	7:23.84
W2x	Italy (ITA); Laura Schiavone; Gabriella Bascelli	7:07.96	Czech Republic (CZE); Jitka Antošová; Lenka Antošová	7:08.52	Poland (POL); Agata Gramatyka; Natalia Madaj	7:13.42
W2-	Romania (ROU); Camelia Lupașcu; Nicoleta Albu	7:27.28	Russia (RUS); Mayya Zhuchkova; Alevtina Podvyazkina	7:30.84	Croatia (CRO); Sonja Kešerac; Maja Anić	7:38.03
W4x	Ukraine (UKR); Svitlana Spiriukhova; Tetiana Kolesnikova; Anastasiya Kozhenkova; Yana Dementyeva	6:30.90	Italy (ITA); Erika Bello; Gabriella Bascelli; Laura Schiavone; Elisabetta Sancassani	6:38.87	Romania (ROU); Anca Luchian; Irina Dorneanu; Andreea Boghian; Cristina Grigoras	6:44.14
W8+	Romania (ROU); Roxana Cogianu; Ionelia Neacsu; Maria Diana Bursuc; Ioana Crăciun; Adelina Cojocariu; Cristina Ilie; Camelia Lupașcu; Enikő Barabás; Teodora Stoica	6:21.52	Belarus (BLR); Nadzeya Belskaya; Natallia Koshal; Natallia Haurylenka; Volha Plashkova; Nina Bondarava; Hanna Nakhayeva; Volha Shcharbachenia-Zhylskaya; Zinaida Kliuchiynskaya; Yaraslava Paulovich	6:26.02	Ukraine (UKR); Tetiana Dudyk; Ganna Kutsenko; Nataliia Huba; Olena Buryak; Anna Kravchenko; Svitlana Novichenko; Olha Hurkovska; Kateryna Tarasenko; Anna Gaidukova	6:32.58

== Medal table ==
Rank	Nation	Gold	Silver	Bronze	Total
1	Greece (GRE)	4	1	0	5
2	Ukraine (UKR)	2	1	1	4
3	Romania (ROU)	2	0	1	3
4	Belarus (BLR)	1	2	0	3
4	Italy (ITA)	1	2	0	3
6	Poland (POL)	1	1	2	4
7	France (FRA)	1	0	3	4
8	Estonia (EST)	1	0	0	1
8	Lithuania (LTU)	1	0	0	1
10	Czech Republic (CZE)	0	3	0	3
11	Serbia (SRB)	0	1	2	3
12	Russia (RUS)	0	1	1	2
13	Germany (GER)	0	1	0	1
13	Switzerland (SUI)	0	1	0	1
15	Croatia (CRO)	0	0	2	2
16	Austria (AUT)	0	0	1	1
16	Spain (ESP)	0	0	1	1
Totals (17 entries)		14	14	14	42
