= Synchronized swimming at the 2016 Summer Olympics – Qualification =

This article details the qualifying phase for synchronized swimming at the 2016 Summer Olympics. The competition at these Games will comprise a total of 104 athletes coming from their respective NOCs; each has been allowed to enter a maximum of nine in the women's team and two in the women's duet. Host nation Brazil is considered the Pan American champion, having reserved a spot on all events.

For the team competitions, the best ranked NOC in each of the five continental championships, with the exception of the host country Brazil which will represent the Pan American continent, obtains a secured place for the Games, while the remaining NOCs will battle out for the three highest-ranked spots at the Olympic Qualification Tournament. For the duet, the best ranked NOC in each of the five continental championships that do not have a qualified team assures a secured spot, while the other eleven top-ranked NOCs will be selected through Olympic Qualification Tournament. All eight NOCs that have already qualified in the team event must each automatically select two synchronized swimmers to form a duet.

== Summary ==
| Nation | Team | Duet | Athletes |
|---|---|---|---|
| Argentina | | X | 2 |
| Australia | X | X | 9 |
| Austria | | X | 2 |
| Belarus | | X | 2 |
| Brazil | X | X | 9 |
| Canada | | X | 2 |
| China | X | X | 9 |
| Colombia | | X | 2 |
| Czech Republic | | X | 2 |
| Egypt | X | X | 9 |
| France | | X | 2 |
| Great Britain | | X | 2 |
| Greece | | X | 2 |
| Israel | | X | 2 |
| Italy | X | X | 9 |
| Japan | X | X | 9 |
| Kazakhstan | | X | 2 |
| Mexico | | X | 2 |
| Russia | X | X | 9 |
| Slovakia | | X | 2 |
| Spain | | X | 2 |
| Switzerland | | X | 2 |
| United States | | X | 2 |
| Ukraine | X | X | 9 |
| Total: 24 NOCs | 8 | 48 | 104 |

== Timeline ==
| Event | Date | Venue |
|---|---|---|
| 2015 European Champions Cup | May 8–10, 2015 | (Netherlands) Haarlemmermeer |
| 2015 Pan American Games | July 9–11, 2015 | (Canada) Toronto |
| African Continental Selection | July 24 – August 9, 2015 | (Russia) Kazan |
| Asian Continental Selection | July 24 – August 9, 2015 | (Russia) Kazan |
| Oceania Continental Selection | July 24 – August 9, 2015 | (Russia) Kazan |
| 2016 Olympic Qualification Tournament | March 2–6, 2016 | (Brazil) Rio de Janeiro |

== Women's team ==
| Event | Place | Qualified team |
|---|---|---|
| African Qualifying | 1 | Egypt |
| 2015 Pan American Games / Host Country | 1 | Brazil* |
| Asian Qualifying | 1 | China |
| 2015 European Champions Cup | 1 | Russia |
| Oceanian Qualifying | 1 | Australia |
| 2016 Olympic Qualifying Tournament | 3 | Ukraine; Japan; Italy |
| Total | 8 | |

* Canada won a gold medal at the 2015 Pan American Games and Brazil finished in 4th place but Brazil was given the spot by FINA.

== Women's duet ==
| Event | Place | Qualified NOC |
|---|---|---|
| Qualified in the team event | 8 | Brazil; Russia; China; Australia; Egypt; Ukraine; Japan; Italy |
| African Qualifying | 0* | ~~South Africa~~ |
| 2015 Pan American Games | 1 | Canada |
| Asian Qualifying | 1 | not allocated – Japan qualified in the women's team |
| 2015 European Champions Cup | 1 | not allocated – Ukraine qualified in the women's team |
| Oceanian Qualifying | 0* | — |
| 2016 Olympic Qualifying Tournament | 15 | Spain; France; Greece; Mexico; Austria; United States; Switzerland; Czech Republic; Kazakhstan; Colombia; Israel; Argentina; Great Britain; Slovakia; Belarus |
| Total | 24 | |
