= South Africa at the 2016 Summer Olympics =

- IOC code: RSA
- NOC: South African Sports Confederation and Olympic Committee
- Website: www.sascoc.co.za

in Rio de Janeiro
- Competitors: 138 in 15 sports
- Flag bearers: Wayde van Niekerk (opening); Caster Semenya (closing)
- Medals Ranked 29th: Gold 2 Silver 6 Bronze 2 Total 10

Summer Olympics appearances (overview)
- 1904; 1908; 1912; 1920; 1924; 1928; 1932; 1936; 1948; 1952; 1956; 1960; 1964–1988; 1992; 1996; 2000; 2004; 2008; 2012; 2016; 2020; 2024; 2028

South Africa competed at the 2016 Summer Olympics in Rio de Janeiro, from 5 to 21 August 2016. This was the nation's seventh consecutive appearance at the Games in the post-apartheid era, and nineteenth overall in Summer Olympic history. The South African Sports Confederation and Olympic Committee (SASCOC) sent the nation's largest ever delegation to the Olympics, with a total of 138 athletes, 93 men and 45 women, competing across 15 sports.

South Africa left Rio de Janeiro with a total of 10 medals (2 gold, 6 silver, and 2 bronze), making it the nation's most successful Olympics since its readmission in 1992. Moreover, it achieved the medal target set by SASCOC for the Games. Four of these medals were awarded to the track and field athletes, including two golds won by runners Caster Semenya and Wayde van Niekerk, who broke the 16-year-old world record in the men's 400 metres. South Africa also proved successful in team sports, as the rugby sevens squad, popularly known by locals as Blitzboks, scored a historic bronze after beating Japan in the men's tournament.

Among the medalists were Luvo Manyonga, who overcame drug addiction to achieve a runner-up finish in the men's long jump, cancer survivor Lawrence Brittain, who picked up a silver alongside his veteran partner Shaun Keeling in the men's rowing pair, and Henri Schoeman, who surprised the field by securing South Africa's first ever triathlon medal with a bronze in the men's race. Swimmers Cameron van der Burgh and Chad le Clos contributed three of the country's silver medals in the pool, with le Clos emerging as South Africa's most decorated Olympian of all-time at four medals (one gold and three silver) over two Games. Meanwhile, Sunette Viljoen rebounded from a disappointing 2012 result to ascend the Olympic podium at her fourth Games, earning a silver in the women's javelin throw.

== Medalists ==
Medal	Name	Sport	Event	Date
Gold	Wayde van Niekerk	Athletics	Men's 400 m	14 August
Gold	Caster Semenya	Athletics	Women's 800 m	20 August
Silver	Cameron van der Burgh	Swimming	Men's 100 m breaststroke	7 August
Silver	Chad le Clos	Swimming	Men's 200 m freestyle	8 August
Silver	Lawrence Brittain; Shaun Keeling	Rowing	Men's coxless pair	11 August
Silver	Chad le Clos	Swimming	Men's 100 m butterfly	12 August
Silver	Luvo Manyonga	Athletics	Men's long jump	13 August
Silver	Sunette Viljoen	Athletics	Women's javelin throw	18 August
Bronze	South Africa national rugby sevens team: Dylan Sage; Philip Snyman; Tim Agaba; Kwagga Smith; Werner Kok; Kyle Brown; Cheslin Kolbe; Rosko Specman; Justin Geduld; Cecil Afrika; Seabelo Senatla; Juan de Jongh; Francois Hougaard	Rugby sevens	Men's tournament	11 August
Bronze	Henri Schoeman	Triathlon	Men's triathlon	18 August

Medals by sport
Sport	1st place, gold medalist(s)	2nd place, silver medalist(s)	3rd place, bronze medalist(s)	Total
Athletics	2	2	0	4
Swimming	0	3	0	3
Rowing	0	1	0	1
Rugby sevens	0	0	1	1
Triathlon	0	0	1	1
Total	2	6	2	10

Medals by date
Date	1st place, gold medalist(s)	2nd place, silver medalist(s)	3rd place, bronze medalist(s)	Total
7 August	0	1	0	1
8 August	0	1	0	1
11 August	0	1	1	2
12 August	0	1	0	1
13 August	0	1	0	1
14 August	1	0	0	1
18 August	0	1	1	2
20 August	1	0	0	1
Total	2	6	2	10

Medals by gender
Gender	1st place, gold medalist(s)	2nd place, silver medalist(s)	3rd place, bronze medalist(s)	Total
Male	1	5	2	8
Female	1	1	0	2
Mixed	0	0	0	0
Total	2	6	2	10

Multiple medalists
Name	Sport	1st place, gold medalist(s)	2nd place, silver medalist(s)	3rd place, bronze medalist(s)	Total
Chad le Clos	Swimming	0	2	0	2

== Competitors ==
South African Sports Confederation and Olympic Committee (SASCOC) confirmed a team of 138 athletes, 93 men and 45 women, to compete across 15 sports at the Games. It was the nation's largest ever delegation sent to the Olympics, breaking its previous record of 134 athletes set in Beijing 2008.

By May 2015, SASCOC enforced a stringent selection policy to ensure that only world-class athletes would compete for the Olympic team. Specifically, SASCOC would not accept any Olympic places for teams or individual-based athletes, who qualified through African continental routes. For some sports, however, where continental route was the only available path, additional athletes or teams would be applicable for selection.

As a result of SASCOC's selection policy, South Africa permitted to only send football (for both men and women) and men's rugby sevens teams to the Games. For individual-based sports, South Africa marked its Olympic debut in golf (new to the 2016 Games) and equestrian dressage, as well as its return to diving and artistic gymnastics after a near decade of absence.

Track and field accounted for the largest number of athletes on the South African team, with 39 entries. There was a single competitor each in badminton, diving, equestrian, artistic gymnastics, and judo.

Seven of the past Olympic medalists from individual-based sports returned, including defending swimming champions Cameron van der Burgh (men's 100 m breaststroke) and Chad le Clos (men's 200 m butterfly), triple jumper Godfrey Khotso Mokoena, middle-distance runner Caster Semenya (women's 800 m), and flatwater canoeist Bridgitte Hartley. Rowers John Smith and James Thompson, both of whom won gold as members of the former lightweight four crew at London 2012, paired up to take on the men's lightweight double sculls at the Games. Along with Mokoena, javelin thrower Sunette Viljoen joined the exclusive club of South African athletes who competed in four consecutive Olympics, becoming the first female from her country to do so.

18-year-old football midfielder Linda Motlhalo was South Africa's youngest competitor, with sailor Roger Hudson, who raced alongside his London 2012 partner Asenathi Jim in the men's 470 class, rounding out the field as the oldest competitor (aged 38). Other notable South African athletes included world-ranked triathlete Richard Murray, and cancer survivor Lawrence Brittain, together with his veteran partner Shaun Keeling in the men's rowing pair. Track star Wayde van Niekerk, who entered the Games as the reigning world champion and a potential gold medal favorite in the men's 400 metres, led the South African team as the flag bearer in the opening ceremony, the first by a male after 12 years.

The following is the list of number of competitors participating in the Games. Note that reserves in fencing, field hockey, football, and handball are not counted as athletes:

Sport	Men	Women	Total
Athletics	26	13	39
Badminton	1	0	1
Canoeing	0	1	1
Cycling	5	2	7
Diving	0	1	1
Equestrian	0	1	1
Football	18	18	36
Golf	2	2	4
Gymnastics	1	0	1
Judo	1	0	1
Rowing	8	4	12
Rugby sevens	13	0	13
Sailing	3	0	3
Swimming	13	1	14
Triathlon	2	2	4
Total	93	45	138

== Athletics (track and field) ==
South African athletes have so far achieved qualifying standards in the following athletics events (up to a maximum of 3 athletes in each event):

On 25 May 2016, six marathon runners (three per gender) were named as part of the initial batch of nominated athletes to the Olympic roster for Rio 2016, including London 2012 Olympians Lusapho April and Irvette van Zyl. Following the end of the qualifying period on 11 July, thirty-nine athletes (26 men and 13 women) rounded out the nation's track and field roster for the Games three days later, with triple jumper and Beijing 2008 silver medalist Godfrey Khotso Mokoena leading the team for his fourth straight Olympics.

Key

- Note–Ranks given for track events are within the athlete's heat only
- Q = Qualified for the next round
- q = Qualified for the next round as a fastest loser or, in field events, by position without achieving the qualifying target
- NR = National record
- N/A = Round not applicable for the event
- Bye = Athlete not required to compete in round

Track & road events
Men

Athlete	Event	Heat		Quarterfinal		Semifinal		Final	
Athlete	Event	Result	Rank	Result	Rank	Result	Rank	Result	Rank
Antonio Alkana	110 m hurdles	13.64	5 q	—N/a		13.55	7	Did not advance	
Lusapho April	Marathon	—N/a						2:15:24	24
Henricho Bruintjies	100 m	Bye		10.33	6	Did not advance			
Elroy Gelant	5000 m	13:22.00	7 q	—N/a				13:17.47	14
Lungile Gongqa	Marathon	—N/a						DNF	
Le Roux Hamman	400 m hurdles	49.72	7	—N/a		Did not advance			
Lindsay Hanekom	400 m hurdles	50.22	7	—N/a		Did not advance			
Tlotliso Leotlela	200 m	20.59	4	—N/a		Did not advance			
Anaso Jobodwana	200 m	20.53	4	—N/a		Did not advance			
Stephen Mokoka	10000 m	—N/a						27:54.57	18
Marc Mundell	50 km walk	—N/a						4:11:03	38
Clarence Munyai	200 m	20.66	3	—N/a		Did not advance			
Sibusiso Nzima	Marathon	—N/a						2:25:33	97
Jacob Rozani	800 m	1:49.79	5	—N/a		Did not advance			
Lebogang Shange	20 km walk	—N/a						1:25:07	44
Akani Simbine	100 m	Bye		10.14	1 Q	9.98	3 q	9.94	5
Wayne Snyman	20 km walk	—N/a						1:29:20	58
Wayde van Niekerk	400 m	45.26	1 Q	—N/a		44.45	2 Q	43.03 WR	1st place, gold medalist(s)
Reinhardt van Rensburg	800 m	1:45.67	2 Q	—N/a		1:45.33	5	Did not advance	
Louis van Zyl	400 m hurdles	49.12	2 Q	—N/a		49.00	5	Did not advance	

Women

Athlete	Event	Heat		Quarterfinal		Semifinal		Final	
Athlete	Event	Result	Rank	Result	Rank	Result	Rank	Result	Rank
Alyssa Conley	100 m	Bye		11.57	6	Did not advance			
Alyssa Conley	200 m	23.17	4	—N/a		Did not advance			
Carina Horn	100 m	Bye		11.32	2 Q	11.20	6	Did not advance	
Christine Kalmer	Marathon	—N/a						2:48:24	96
Wenda Nel	400 m hurdles	55.55	2 Q	—N/a		55.83	6	Did not advance	
Justine Palframan	200 m	23.33	5	—N/a		Did not advance			
Justine Palframan	400 m	53.96	7	—N/a		Did not advance			
Anél Oosthuizen	20 km walk	—N/a						1:45:06	63
Dina Lebo Phalula	Marathon	—N/a						2:41:46	63
Dominique Scott	10000 m	—N/a						31:51.47	21
Caster Semenya	800 m	1:59.31	1 Q	—N/a		1:58.15	1 Q	1:55.28 NR	1st place, gold medalist(s)
Tsholofelo Thipe	400 m	52.80	4	—N/a		Did not advance			
Irvette van Zyl	Marathon	—N/a						DNS	

Field events
Men

Athlete	Event	Qualification		Final	
Athlete	Event	Distance	Position	Distance	Position
Stefan Brits	Long jump	7.71	22	Did not advance	
Luvo Manyonga	Long jump	8.12	4 q	8.37	2nd place, silver medalist(s)
Godfrey Khotso Mokoena	Triple jump	16.51	21	Did not advance	
Rushwahl Samaai	Long jump	8.03	5 q	7.97	9
Rocco van Rooyen	Javelin throw	78.48	24	Did not advance	

Women

Athlete	Event	Qualification		Final	
Athlete	Event	Distance	Position	Distance	Position
Lynique Prinsloo	Long jump	6.10	33	Did not advance	
Sunette Viljoen	Javelin throw	63.54	6 Q	64.92	2nd place, silver medalist(s)

Combined events – Men's decathlon

Athlete	Event	100 m	LJ	SP	HJ	400 m	110H	DT	PV	JT	1500 m	Final	Rank
Willem Coertzen	Result	11.12	6.98	14.00	DNS	—	—	—	—	—	—	DNF	
Willem Coertzen	Points	834	809	728	0	—	—	—	—	—	—	DNF	

== Badminton ==
Jacob Maliekal qualified for the men's singles into the Olympic tournament. He picked up a continental berth as Africa's top shuttler based on his performance in the BWF World Rankings as of 5 May 2016.

Athlete	Event	Group Stage			Elimination	Quarterfinal	Semifinal	Final / BM	
Athlete	Event	Opposition Score	Opposition Score	Rank	Opposition Score	Opposition Score	Opposition Score	Opposition Score	Rank
Jacob Maliekal	Men's singles	Son W-h (KOR); L (10–21, 10–21)	Pochtarev (UKR); W (21–18, 21–19)	2	Did not advance				

== Canoeing ==
=== Sprint ===
Bridgitte Hartley qualified for the Women's K-1 500 metres through the 2015 ICF Canoe Sprint World Championships.

Athlete	Event	Heats		Semifinals		Final	
Athlete	Event	Time	Rank	Time	Rank	Time	Rank
Bridgitte Hartley	Women's K-1 200 m	41.698	3 Q	41.478	3 FB	42.066	13
Bridgitte Hartley	Women's K-1 500 m	1:55.737	3 Q	1:58.397	5 FB	2:01.890	16

Qualification Legend: FA = Qualify to final (medal); FB = Qualify to final B (non-medal)

== Cycling ==
=== Road ===
Four South African riders qualified for the following places in the men's and women's Olympic road race by virtue of their top 4 national ranking in the 2015 UCI Africa Tour (for men) and top 22 in the UCI World Ranking (for women). The men's road cycling team, Daryl Impey and Louis Meintjes, were named as part of the initial batch of nominated athletes to the Olympic roster on 25 May 2016, with the women, Ashleigh Moolman-Pasio and An-Li Kachelhoffer joining them on 14 July. Moolman-Pasio also qualified for the time trial.

Athlete	Event	Time	Rank
Daryl Impey	Men's road race	6:19:43	28
Louis Meintjes	Men's road race	6:10:27	7
An-Li Kachelhoffer	Women's road race	4:01:29	39
Ashleigh Moolman-Pasio	Women's road race	3:52:41	10
Ashleigh Moolman-Pasio	Women's time trial	46:29.11	12

=== Mountain biking ===
South African mountain bikers, Alan Hatherly and James Reid qualified for the Olympic cross-country race, as a result of the nation's twelfth-place finish in the UCI Olympic Ranking List of 25 May 2016.

Athlete	Event	Time	Rank
Alan Hatherly	Men's cross-country	1:42:03	26
James Reid	Men's cross-country	LAP (3 laps)	42

=== BMX ===
Kyle Dodd qualified for one men's quota place in BMX at the Olympics, as a result of his top three placement for men, not yet qualified, at the 2016 UCI BMX World Championships.

Athlete	Event	Seeding		Quarterfinal		Semifinal		Final	
Athlete	Event	Result	Rank	Points	Rank	Points	Rank	Result	Rank
Kyle Dodd	Men's BMX	36.45	26	14	6	Did not advance			

== Diving ==
Julia Vincent qualified by virtue of her top national finish from Africa at the 2015 FINA World Championships.

Athlete	Event	Preliminaries		Semifinals		Final	
Athlete	Event	Points	Rank	Points	Rank	Points	Rank
Julia Vincent	Women's 3 m springboard	220.30	29	Did not advance			

== Equestrian ==
Dressage rider, Tanya Seymour, qualified for the equestrian competition by virtue of her top national finish from Africa and the Middle East at the FEI qualification event in Perl, Germany.

=== Dressage ===
Athlete	Horse	Event	Grand Prix		Grand Prix Special		Grand Prix Freestyle		Overall	
Athlete	Horse	Event	Score	Rank	Score	Rank	Technical	Artistic	Score	Rank
Tanya Seymour	Ramoneur	Individual	63.929	56	Did not advance					

== Football ==
Summary

Key:

- A.E.T – After extra time.
- P – Match decided by penalty-shootout.

Team	Event	Group Stage				Quarterfinal	Semifinal	Final / BM	
Team	Event	Opposition Score	Opposition Score	Opposition Score	Rank	Opposition Score	Opposition Score	Opposition Score	Rank
South Africa men's	Men's tournament	Brazil; D 0–0	Denmark; L 0–1	Iraq; D 1–1	4	Did not advance			13
South Africa women's	Women's tournament	Sweden; L 0–1	China; L 0–2	Brazil; D 0–0	4	Did not advance			10

=== Men's tournament ===
South Africa men's football team qualified for the Olympics by winning the third-place playoff of the 2015 U-23 Africa Cup of Nations.

Team roster

The following is the South Africa squad in the men's football tournament of the 2016 Summer Olympics. The team of 18 players was officially named on 14 July.

Head coach: Owen Da Gama

No.	Pos.	Player	Date of birth (age)	Caps	Goals	Club
1	GK	Jody February	12 May 1996 (aged 20)	0	0	(South African Football Association) Ajax Cape Town
2	DF	Eric Mathoho*	1 March 1990 (aged 26)	0	0	(South African Football Association) Kaizer Chiefs
3	DF	Repo Malepe	18 February 1997 (aged 19)	0	0	(South African Football Association) Orlando Pirates
4	FW	Mothobi Mvala	14 June 1994 (aged 22)	0	0	(South African Football Association) Highlands Park
5	DF	Rivaldo Coetzee	16 October 1996 (aged 19)	0	0	(South African Football Association) Ajax Cape Town
6	DF	Kwanda Mngonyama	25 September 1993 (aged 22)	0	0	(South African Football Association) Maritzburg United
7	MF	Menzi Masuku	15 April 1993 (aged 23)	0	0	(South African Football Association) Orlando Pirates
8	MF	Tyroane Sandows	12 February 1995 (aged 21)	0	0	(Brazilian Football Confederation) Grêmio
9	FW	Tashreeq Morris	13 May 1994 (aged 22)	0	0	(South African Football Association) Ajax Cape Town
10	FW	Keagan Dolly (c)	22 January 1993 (aged 23)	0	0	(South African Football Association) Mamelodi Sundowns
11	MF	Maphosa Modiba	22 July 1995 (aged 21)	0	0	(South African Football Association) Mpumalanga Black Aces
12	FW	Lebo Mothiba	28 January 1996 (aged 20)	0	0	(French Football Federation) Lille
13	DF	Abbubaker Mobara	18 February 1994 (aged 22)	0	0	(South African Football Association) Orlando Pirates
14	MF	Gift Motupa	23 September 1994 (aged 21)	0	0	(South African Football Association) Orlando Pirates
15	MF	Phumlani Ntshangase	24 December 1994 (aged 21)	0	0	(South African Football Association) Bidvest Wits
16	GK	Itumeleng Khune*	20 June 1987 (aged 29)	0	0	(South African Football Association) Kaizer Chiefs
17	DF	Tebogo Moerane	7 April 1995 (aged 21)	0	0	(South African Football Association) Bidvest Wits
18	MF	Deolin Mekoa	10 August 1993 (aged 22)	0	0	(South African Football Association) Maritzburg United
19	FW	Andile Fikizolo	13 May 1994 (aged 22)	0	0	(South African Football Association) Lamontville Golden Arrows
21	FW	Thabiso Kutumela	3 July 1993 (aged 23)	0	0	(South African Football Association) Baroka

* Over-aged player.

Group play

Pos	Team	Pld	W	D	L	GF	GA	GD	Pts	Qualification
1	Brazil (H)	3	1	2	0	4	0	+4	5	Quarter-finals
2	Denmark	3	1	1	1	1	4	−3	4	Quarter-finals
3	Iraq	3	0	3	0	1	1	0	3	
4	South Africa	3	0	2	1	1	2	−1	2	

Source: Rio2016 & FIFA
Rules for classification: Tiebreakers
(H) Hosts
4 August 2016
16:00

Brazil	0–0	South Africa
	Report (Rio2016); Report (FIFA)

Estádio Nacional Mané Garrincha, Brasília
Attendance: 69,389
Referee: Antonio Mateu Lahoz (Spain)

7 August 2016
19:00

Denmark	1–0	South Africa
Skov 69'	Report (Rio2016); Report (FIFA)

Estádio Nacional Mané Garrincha, Brasília
Attendance: 32,314
Referee: Ryuji Sato (Japan)

10 August 2016
22:00

South Africa	1–1	Iraq
Motupa 6'	Report (Rio2016); Report (FIFA)	Abdul-Amir 14'

Arena Corinthians, São Paulo
Attendance: 37,742
Referee: Roddy Zambrano (Ecuador)

=== Women's tournament ===
South Africa women's football team qualified for the Olympics by winning the fourth round play-off of the 2015 CAF Women's Olympic Qualifying Tournament.

Team roster

Head coach: (Netherlands) Vera Pauw

South Africa named a squad of 18 players and 4 alternates for the tournament, which was announced on 14 July 2016. During the tournament, Thembi Kgatlana replaced Shiwe Nogwanya on 6 August 2016 due to injury.

No.	Pos.	Player	Date of birth (age)	Caps	Goals	Club
1	GK	Roxanne Barker	6 May 1991 (aged 25)	28	0	(Football Association of Iceland) Knattspyrnufélag Akureyrar
2	DF	Lebogang Ramalepe	3 December 1991 (aged 24)	27	1	(South African Football Association) MaIndies
3	DF	Nothando Vilakazi	28 October 1988 (aged 27)	86	5	(South African Football Association) Palace Super Falcons
4	DF	Noko Matlou	30 September 1985 (aged 30)	124	63	(South African Football Association) MaIndies
5	DF	Janine van Wyk (captain)	17 April 1987 (aged 29)	131	11	(South African Football Association) JVW
6	MF	Mamello Makhabane	24 February 1988 (aged 28)	71	18	(South African Football Association) JVW
7	MF	Stephanie Malherbe	5 April 1996 (aged 20)	7	0	(United States Soccer Federation) Texas A&M University
8	MF	Robyn Moodaly	16 June 1994 (aged 22)	14	2	(United States Soccer Federation) University of Northwestern Ohio
9	MF	Amanda Dlamini	22 July 1988 (aged 28)	100	24	(South African Football Association) University of Johannesburg
10	MF	Linda Motlhalo	1 July 1998 (aged 18)	8	3	(Slovak Football Association) FKM Nové Zámky
11	FW	Shiwe Nogwanya	7 March 1994 (aged 22)	28	4	(South African Football Association) Bloemfontein Celtic
12	FW	Jermaine Seoposenwe	12 October 1993 (aged 22)	41	10	(United States Soccer Federation) Samford University
13	DF	Bambanani Mbane	12 March 1990 (aged 26)	2	0	(South African Football Association) Bloemfontein Celtic
14	FW	Sanah Mollo	30 January 1987 (aged 29)	69	21	(South African Football Association) Mamelodi Sundowns
15	MF	Refiloe Jane	4 August 1992 (aged 23)	62	5	(South African Football Association) Vaal University of Technology
16	GK	Andile Dlamini	2 September 1992 (aged 23)	19	0	(South African Football Association) Mamelodi Sundowns
17	MF	Leandra Smeda	22 July 1989 (aged 27)	60	13	(South African Football Association) University of the Western Cape
18	MF	Mpumi Nyandeni	19 August 1987 (aged 28)	125	38	(South African Football Association) JVW
20	FW	Thembi Kgatlana	2 May 1996 (aged 20)	0	0	(South African Football Association) University of the Western Cape

Group play

Pos	Team	Pld	W	D	L	GF	GA	GD	Pts	Qualification
1	Brazil (H)	3	2	1	0	8	1	+7	7	Quarter-finals
2	China	3	1	1	1	2	3	−1	4	Quarter-finals
3	Sweden	3	1	1	1	2	5	−3	4	Quarter-finals
4	South Africa	3	0	1	2	0	3	−3	1	

Source: Rio2016 & FIFA
Rules for classification: Tiebreakers
(H) Hosts
3 August 2016
13:00

Sweden	1–0	South Africa
Fischer 76'	Report (Rio2016); Report (FIFA); Report

Estádio Olímpico João Havelange, Rio de Janeiro
Attendance: 13,439
Referee: Teodora Albon (Romania)

6 August 2016
19:00

South Africa	0–2	China
	Report (Rio2016); Report (FIFA)	Gu Yasha 45+1'; Tan Ruyin 87'

Estádio Olímpico João Havelange, Rio de Janeiro
Attendance: 25,000
Referee: Esther Staubli (Switzerland)

9 August 2016
22:00 (21:00 UTC–4)

South Africa	0–0	Brazil
	Report (Rio2016); Report (FIFA)

Arena da Amazônia, Manaus
Attendance: 38,415
Referee: Stéphanie Frappart (France)

== Golf ==
South Africa has entered four golfers (two per gender) into the Olympic tournament. Brandon Stone (world no. 92), Jaco van Zyl (world no. 67), Paula Reto (world no. 122) and Ashleigh Simon (world no. 214) qualified directly among the top 60 eligible players for their respective individual events based on the IGF World Rankings as of 11 July 2016.

Former major winners Louis Oosthuizen and Charl Schwartzel, ranked twelfth and twentieth in the men's world rankings respectively, announced in April 2016 that they would not compete in Rio.

Athlete	Event	Round 1	Round 2	Round 3	Round 4	Total		
Athlete	Event	Score	Score	Score	Score	Score	Par	Rank
Brandon Stone	Men's	75	72	71	75	293	+ 9	=55
Jaco van Zyl	Men's	71	74	70	71	286	+2	=43
Paula Reto	Women's	74	67	68	71	280	−4	=16
Ashleigh Simon	Women's	75	69	77	75	296	+12	50

== Gymnastics ==
=== Artistic ===
South Africa has entered one artistic gymnast into the Olympic competition for the first time since 2004. Ryan Patterson had claimed his Olympic spot in the men's apparatus and all-around events at the Olympic Test Event in Rio de Janeiro. Moreover, he became the first male South African gymnast to compete at the Games since 1956.

Men

Athlete	Event	Qualification								Final							
Athlete	Event	Apparatus						Total	Rank	Apparatus						Total	Rank
Athlete	Event	F	PH	R	V	PB	HB	Total	Rank	F	PH	R	V	PB	HB	Total	Rank
Ryan Patterson	All-around	14.300	13.033	13.333	13.733	13.000	13.291	80.690	46	Did not advance							

== Judo ==
South Africa has qualified one judoka for the men's middleweight category (90 kg) at the Games. Zack Piontek was directly ranked among the top 22 eligible judokas for men in the IJF World Ranking List of 30 May 2016.

Athlete	Event	Round of 64	Round of 32	Round of 16	Quarterfinals	Semifinals	Repechage	Final / BM	
Athlete	Event	Opposition Result	Opposition Result	Opposition Result	Opposition Result	Opposition Result	Opposition Result	Opposition Result	Rank
Zack Piontek	Men's −90 kg	Bye	Camilo (BRA); L 000–101	Did not advance					

== Rowing ==
South Africa has qualified a total of five boats for each of the following rowing classes into the Olympic regatta. Four rowing crews had confirmed Olympic places for their boats each in the coxless pair and lightweight double sculls (both men and women) at the 2015 FISA World Championships in Lac d'Aiguebelette, France, while the men's four rowers were further added to the South African roster as a result of their top two finish at the 2016 European & Final Qualification Regatta in Lucerne, Switzerland.

The rowing team, led by London 2012 gold medalists John Smith and James Thompson, was named as part of the full nomination of South African athletes for the Games on 14 July 2016.

Men

Athlete	Event	Heats		Repechage		Semifinals		Final	
Athlete	Event	Time	Rank	Time	Rank	Time	Rank	Time	Rank
Lawrence Brittain; Shaun Keeling	Pair	6:41.42	2 SA/B	Bye		6:27.59	3 FA	7:02.51	2nd place, silver medalist(s)
John Smith; James Thompson	Lightweight double sculls	6:23.10	1 SA/B	Bye		6:38.01	1 FA	6:33.29	4
Vincent Breet; Jake Green; David Hunt; Jonty Smith	Four	6:01.64	4 R	6:34.97	1 SA/B	6:15.22	2 FA	6:05.80	4

Women

Athlete	Event	Heats		Repechage		Semifinals		Final	
Athlete	Event	Time	Rank	Time	Rank	Time	Rank	Time	Rank
Kate Christowitz; Lee-Ann Persse	Pair	7:11.29	2 SA/B	Bye		7:24.03	3 FA	7:28.50	5
Ursula Grobler; Kirsten McCann	Lightweight double sculls	7:07.37	1 SA/B	Bye		7:19.09	1 FA	7:11.26	5

Qualification Legend: FA=Final A (medal); FB=Final B (non-medal); FC=Final C (non-medal); FD=Final D (non-medal); FE=Final E (non-medal); FF=Final F (non-medal); SA/B=Semifinals A/B; SC/D=Semifinals C/D; SE/F=Semifinals E/F; QF=Quarterfinals; R=Repechage

== Rugby sevens ==
=== Men's tournament ===
The South Africa men's rugby sevens team qualified for the Olympics by having achieved one of the top four places at the 2014–15 Sevens World Series.

Team roster

The following is the South Africa roster in the men's rugby sevens tournament of the 2016 Summer Olympics.

Head coach: Neil Powell

No.	Pos.	Player	Date of birth (age)	Events	Points	Union
1	BK	Dylan Sage	24 January 1992 (aged 24)	7	40	(South Africa) SARU
2	FW	Philip Snyman	26 April 1987 (aged 29)	37	211	(South Africa) SARU
3	FW	Tim Agaba	23 July 1989 (aged 27)	7	25	(South Africa) SARU
4	FW	Kwagga Smith	11 June 1993 (aged 23)	24	250	(South Africa) SARU
5	FW	Werner Kok	17 January 1993 (aged 23)	19	210	(South Africa) SARU
6	FW	Kyle Brown (c)	6 February 1987 (aged 29)	56	385	(South Africa) SARU
7	BK	Cheslin Kolbe	28 October 1993 (aged 22)	12	192	(South Africa) Stormers
8	BK	Rosko Specman	28 April 1989 (aged 27)	13	169	(South Africa) SARU
9	BK	Justin Geduld	1 October 1993 (aged 22)	25	558	(South Africa) SARU
10	BK	Cecil Afrika	3 March 1988 (aged 28)	45	1,123	(South Africa) SARU
11	BK	Seabelo Senatla	10 March 1993 (aged 23)	29	785	(South Africa) Stormers
12	BK	Juan de Jongh	15 April 1988 (aged 28)	6	40	(South Africa) Stormers
13	BK	Francois Hougaard	6 April 1988 (aged 28)	6	25	(England) Worcester Warriors

Group play

Pos	Team	Pld	W	D	L	PF	PA	PD	Pts	Qualification
1	South Africa	3	2	0	1	55	12	+43	7	Quarter-finals
2	France	3	2	0	1	57	45	+12	7	Quarter-finals
3	Australia	3	2	0	1	52	48	+4	7	Quarter-finals
4	Spain	3	0	0	3	17	76	−59	3	

Source: World Rugby
Rules for classification: 1) Points; 2) Head-to-head result; 3) Point difference; 4) Points scored.

9 August 2016
11:30

South Africa	24–0	Spain
Try: Afrika (2) 1' c, 7' c Senatla 8' m Snyman 12' m Con: Afrika (2/4)	Report (Rio 2016); Report (World Rugby)

Deodoro Stadium, Rio de Janeiro
Referee: Nick Briant (New Zealand)

9 August 2016
16:30

South Africa	26–0	France
Try: Geduld 1' c Smith 4' c Brown 6' m Sage 12' c Con: Afrika (3/4)	Report (Rio 2016); Report (World Rugby)

Deodoro Stadium, Rio de Janeiro
Referee: Richard Kelly (New Zealand)

10 August 2016
11:30

South Africa	5–12	Australia
Try: Senatla 11' m Con: Kolbe (0/1)	Report (Rio 2016); Report (World Rugby)	Try: Parahi 3' c Cusack 6' m Con: Stannard (1/2)

Deodoro Stadium, Rio de Janeiro
Referee: Alexandre Ruiz (France)

Quarterfinal

10 August 2016
18:30

South Africa	22–5	Australia
Try: Speckman 3' m Senatla 5' m, 12' m Brown 10' c Con: Afrika (1/4)	Report (Rio 2016); Report (World Rugby)	Try: Cusack 7' m Con: Clark (0/1)

Deodoro Stadium, Rio de Janeiro
Referee: Mike Adamson (Great Britain)

Semifinal

11 August 2016
15:00

Great Britain	7–5	South Africa
Try: Norton 8' c Con: Mitchell (1/1)	Report (Rio 2016); Report (World Rugby)	Try: Brown 2' m Con: Afrika (0/1)

Deodoro Stadium, Rio de Janeiro
Referee: Richard Kelly (New Zealand)

Bronze medal match

11 August 2016
18:30

Japan	14–54	South Africa (bronze)
Try: Kuwazuru 8' c Goya 11' c Con: Goya (2/2)	Report (Rio 2016); Report (World Rugby)	Try: De Jongh 1' c Speckman (3) 3' c, 10' c, 19' c Afrika (2) 12' c, 15' c Geduld 17' m Kolbe 20' c Con: Afrika (5/6); Geduld (2/2)

Deodoro Stadium, Rio de Janeiro
Referee: Alexandre Ruiz (France)

== Sailing ==
South African sailors have qualified one boat in each of the following classes through the individual fleet World Championships. The sailing crew was announced as part of the first batch being nominated to the Olympic roster on 25 May 2016.

Men

Athlete	Event	Race											Net points	Final rank
Athlete	Event	1	2	3	4	5	6	7	8	9	10	M*	Net points	Final rank
Stefano Marcia	Laser	30	25	42	38	43	38	~~44~~	36	39	40	EL	331	40
Asenathi Jim; Roger Hudson	470	18	~~24~~	15	14	11	18	11	20	18	23	EL	148	20

M = Medal race; EL = Eliminated – did not advance into the medal race

== Swimming ==
A total of 11 male swimmers, led by London 2012 champions Chad le Clos and Cameron van der Burgh, had been selected to the South African roster for the Olympics. Meanwhile, Michelle Weber entered the 10 km (6.2 mi) open water race as the squad's sole female and one of the top 10 eligible swimmers at the World Olympic Qualifier in Setubal, Portugal, marking the second time not to send any of the women to the Olympic pool since the post-apartheid era (the first being in 2004).

Men

Athlete	Event	Heat		Semifinal		Final	
Athlete	Event	Time	Rank	Time	Rank	Time	Rank
Myles Brown	200 m freestyle	1:46.78	13 Q	1:46.57	12	Did not advance	
Myles Brown	400 m freestyle	3:45.92	12	—N/a		Did not advance	
Jarred Crous	200 m breaststroke	2:12.64	25	Did not advance			
Douglas Erasmus	50 m freestyle	22.37	29	Did not advance			
Chad Ho	10 km open water	—N/a				1:53:04.8	10
Chad le Clos	200 m freestyle	1:45.89	3 Q	1:45.94	7 Q	1:45.20	2nd place, silver medalist(s)
Chad le Clos	100 m butterfly	51.75	7 Q	51.43	2 Q	51.14	2nd place, silver medalist(s)
Chad le Clos	200 m butterfly	1:55.57	3 Q	1:55.19	4 Q	1:54.06	4
Matthew Meyer	1500 m freestyle	15:36.22	41	—N/a		Did not advance	
Michael Meyer	400 m individual medley	4:18.13	17	—N/a		Did not advance	
Christopher Reid	100 m backstroke	53.68	12 Q	53.70	10	Did not advance	
Sebastien Rousseau	400 m individual medley	4:18.72	21	—N/a		Did not advance	
Brad Tandy	50 m freestyle	21.94	12 Q	21.80	8 Q	21.79	6
Cameron van der Burgh	100 m breaststroke	59.35	7 Q	59.21	3 Q	58.69	2nd place, silver medalist(s)
Cameron van der Burgh	200 m breaststroke	2:12.67	26	Did not advance			
Dylan Bosch; Myles Brown; Calvyn Justus; Sebastien Rousseau	4 × 200 m freestyle relay	7:12.61	11	—N/a		Did not advance	
Dylan Bosch; Myles Brown; Christopher Reid; Cameron van der Burgh	4 × 100 m medley relay	3:35.50	13	—N/a		Did not advance	

Women

Athlete	Event	Final	
Athlete	Event	Time	Rank
Michelle Weber	10 km open water	1:59:05.0	18

== Triathlon ==
South Africa has qualified a total of four triathletes for the Olympics. London 2012 Olympian Richard Murray secured the men's triathlon spot with a top three finish at the ITU World Qualification Event in Rio de Janeiro. Meanwhile, Henri Schoeman, Mari Rabie, and Gillian Sanders were ranked among the top 40 eligible triathletes each in the men's and women's event, respectively, based on the ITU Olympic Qualification List as of 15 May 2016.

Athlete	Event	Swim (1.5 km)	Trans 1	Bike (40 km)	Trans 2	Run (10 km)	Total Time	Rank
Richard Murray	Men's	18:20	0:46	55:35	0:35	30:34	1:45:50	4
Henri Schoeman	Men's	17:25	0:53	55:32	0:34	32:30	1:45:43	3rd place, bronze medalist(s)
Mari Rabie	Women's	19:04	0:52	1:01:32	0:35	37:10	1:59:13	11
Gillian Sanders	Women's	19:50	0:56	1:03:59	0:39	36:05	2:01:29	23

== See also ==
- South Africa at the 2016 Summer Paralympics
