= 2017 World Rowing Championships – Men's lightweight coxless pair =

Men's lightweight coxless pair at the 2017 World Rowing Championships
- Venue: Nathan Benderson Park
- Location: Sarasota, United States
- Dates: 24–29 September
- Competitors: 16 from 8 nations
- Winning time: 6:32.42

Medalists
gold medal	Mark O'Donovan; Shane O'Driscoll	Ireland
silver medal	Giuseppe Di Mare; Alfonso Scalzone	Italy
bronze medal	Xavier Vela; Willian Giaretton	Brazil

The men's lightweight coxless pair competition at the 2017 World Rowing Championships in Sarasota took place in Nathan Benderson Park.

== Schedule ==
The schedule was as follows:

Date	Time	Round
Sunday 24 September 2017	10:10	Heats
Tuesday 26 September 2017	11:48	Repechage
Friday 29 September 2017	09:00	Final B
Friday 29 September 2017	12:00	Final A

All times are Eastern Daylight Time (UTC-4)

== Results ==
=== Heats ===
Heat winners advanced directly to the A final. The remaining boats were sent to the repechage.

==== Heat 1 ====
Rank	Rowers	Country	Time	Notes
1	Mark O'Donovan; Shane O'Driscoll	Ireland	6:33.20	FA
2	Joel Cassells; Sam Scrimgeour	Great Britain	6:38.57	R
3	Giuseppe Di Mare; Alfonso Scalzone	Italy	6:40.39	R
4	Roland Szigeti; David Forrai	Hungary	7:24.30	R

==== Heat 2 ====
Rank	Rowers	Country	Time	Notes
1	Xavier Vela; Willian Giaretton	Brazil	6:36.11	FA
2	Nikita Bolozin; Aleksei Kiiashko	Russia	6:45.24	R
3	John Devlin; Alex Twist	United States	6:53.63	R
4	Edmundo Reynoso; Angy Canul	Mexico	6:57.68	R

=== Repechage ===
The four fastest boats advanced to the A final. The remaining boats were sent to the B final.

Rank	Rowers	Country	Time	Notes
1	Giuseppe Di Mare; Alfonso Scalzone	Italy	6:40.42	FA
2	Nikita Bolozin; Aleksei Kiiashko	Russia	6:41.75	FA
3	Joel Cassells; Sam Scrimgeour	Great Britain	6:42.69	FA
4	John Devlin; Alex Twist	United States	6:55.67	FA
5	Roland Szigeti; David Forrai	Hungary	6:58.65	FB
6	Edmundo Reynoso; Angy Canul	Mexico	7:08.45	FB

=== Finals ===
The A final determined the rankings for places 1 to 6. Additional rankings were determined in the B final.

==== Final B ====
Rank	Rowers	Country	Time
1	Roland Szigeti; David Forrai	Hungary	7:05.22
2	Edmundo Reynoso; Angy Canul	Mexico	7:05.24

==== Final A ====
Rank	Rowers	Country	Time
1st place, gold medalist(s)	Mark O'Donovan; Shane O'Driscoll	Ireland	6:32.42
2nd place, silver medalist(s)	Giuseppe Di Mare; Alfonso Scalzone	Italy	6:34.20
3rd place, bronze medalist(s)	Xavier Vela; Willian Giaretton	Brazil	6:35.30
4	Joel Cassells; Sam Scrimgeour	Great Britain	6:37.56
5	Nikita Bolozin; Aleksei Kiiashko	Russia	6:45.52
6	John Devlin; Alex Twist	United States	6:59.01
