= Sonja Kešerac =

Croatian rower

Medal record

Women's rowing

Representing Croatia

European Rowing Championships
Bronze medal – third place	2009 Brest	W2-
Bronze medal – third place	2010 Montemor-o-Velho	W2-
Bronze medal – third place	2012 Varese	W2-

Sonja Kešerac (born 20 February 1985 in Osijek) is a Croatian rower. Since 2009, Kešerac has competed in coxless pairs with Maja Anić.
