= Wojciech Gutorski =

Polish rower

Personal information
- Born: 25 May 1982 (age 44) Bydgoszcz
- Height: 1.97 m (6 ft 5 1/2 in)
- Weight: 93 kg (205 lb)

Sport
- Country: Poland
- Sport: Rowing
- Club: Lotto Bydgostia WSG
Medal record
European Championships
Gold medal – first place	2009 Brest	Eight
Silver medal – second place	2007 Poznań	Eight
Silver medal – second place	2013 Seville	Coxless pair
Bronze medal – third place	2008 Marathon	Eight

Wojciech Gutorski (born 25 May 1982 in Bydgoszcz) is a Polish rower. He participated in three Olympic Games so far, including the 2012 Summer Olympics in London where he competed in the Men's Pair event together with his teammate Jarosław Godek. They finished fourth in the B finals, earning them a tenth place overall. In the 2004 and 2008 Games he was part of the Polish men's eight, finishing in 8th and 5th places respectively.
