= Silas Stafford =

American rower

Personal information
- Born: April 27, 1986 (age 38)
- Height: 1.93 m (6 ft 4 in)
- Weight: 94 kg (207 lb)

Sport
- Country: United States
- Sport: Rowing
- Event: Men's pair

Silas Stafford (born April 27, 1986) is an American rower. He participated in the 2012 Summer Olympics in London where he competed in the Men's Pair event together with his teammate Thomas Peszek. They finished second in the B finals, earning them an eighth place overall.
