= Jarosław Godek =

Polish rower (born 1981)

Personal information
- Born: 25 January 1981 (age 45) Szubin, Poland
Medal record
Men's rowing
Representing Poland
European Championships
| Gold medal – first place | 2009 Brest | Eight |
| Silver medal – second place | 2007 Poznań | Coxless pair |
| Silver medal – second place | 2010 Montemor-o-Velho | Eight |
| Silver medal – second place | 2013 Seville | Coxless pair |

Jarosław Godek (born 5 August 1981 in Szubin, Poland) is a Polish rower. He finished 6th in the men's coxless four at the 2004 Summer Olympics. In 2008, he and team-mate Piotr Hojka reached the C-final in the men's coxless pair. At the 2012 Summer Olympics he reached the semi-final of the men's coxless pairs with team-mate Wojciech Gutorski.
