= Maja Anić =

Croatian rower

Personal information
- Born: 25 December 1988 (age 37) Osijek, Croatia
Medal record
Women's rowing
Representing Croatia
European Championships
Bronze medal – third place	2009 Brest	W2-
Bronze medal – third place	2010 Montemor-o-Velho	W2-
Bronze medal – third place	2012 Varese	W2-

Maja Anić (born 25 December 1988 in Osijek) is a Croatian rower. Since 2009, Anić has competed in coxless pairs with Sonja Kešerac.
