= Roel Braas =

Dutch rower

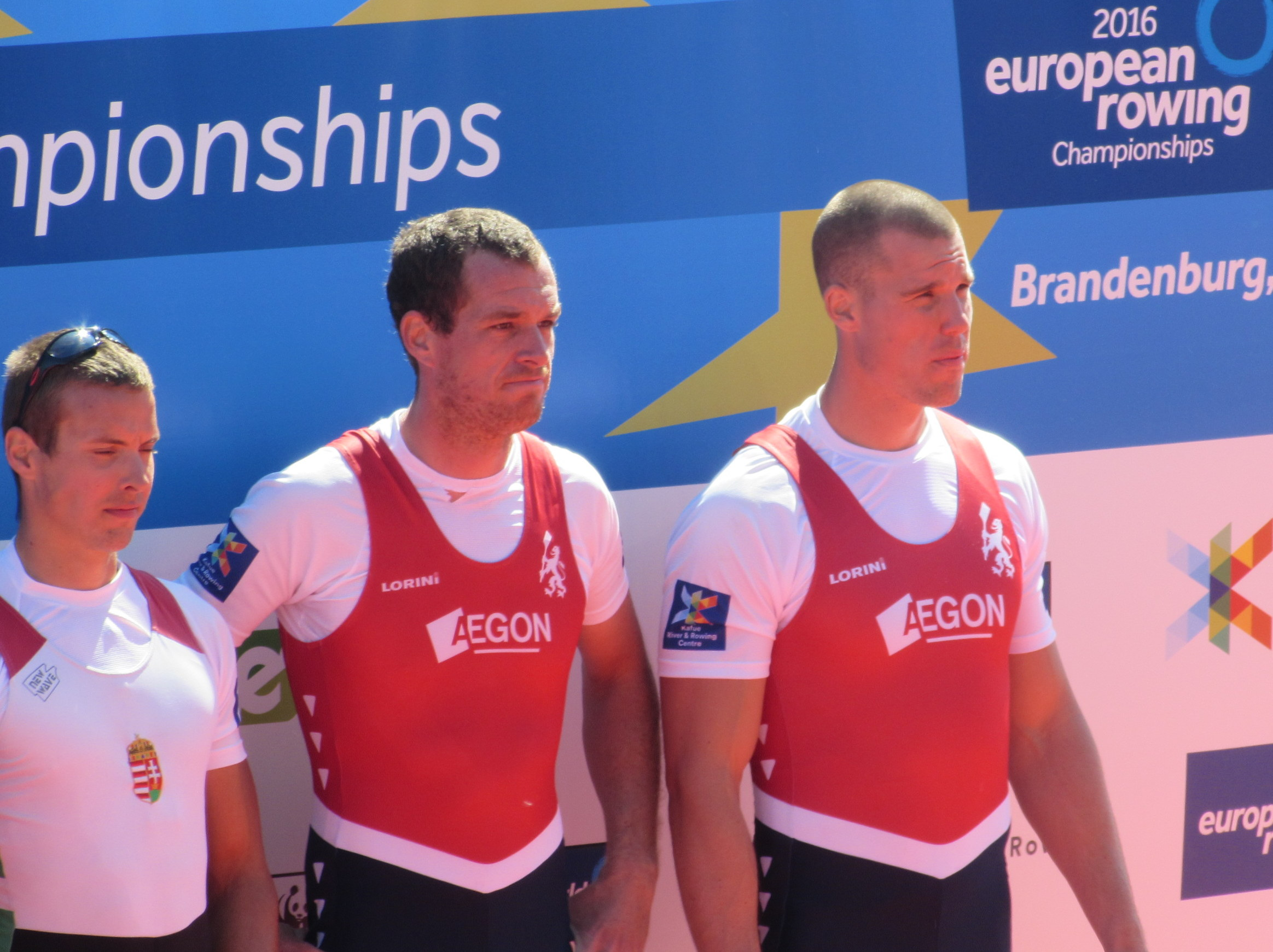
- Roel Braas and Mitchel Steenman (Netherlands) and Adrián Juhász (Hungary) at the 2016 European Rowing Championships in Brandenburg an der Havel, Germany

Personal information
- Nationality: Dutch
- Born: 11 March 1987 (age 39) Alkmaar, Netherlands
- Height: 201 cm (6 ft 7 in)
- Weight: 104 kg (229 lb)

Sport
- Sport: Rowing

Roel Braas (born 11 March 1987) is a Dutch rower. He competed in the Men's eight event at the 2012 Summer Olympics. He competed in the Men's coxless pair event at the 2016 Summer Olympics.
