= Apostolos Goudoulas =

Greek rower (born 1985)

Medal record

Men's rowing

Representing Greece

World Rowing Championships
| Gold medal – first place | 2008 Linz | LM2- |
| Silver medal – second place | 2010 Karapiro | M4- |
| Bronze medal – third place | 2009 Poznań | M2- |

European Championships
| Gold medal – first place | 2008 Athens | Coxless four |
| Gold medal – first place | 2009 Brest | Pair |
| Gold medal – first place | 2011 Plovdiv | Pair |
| Gold medal – first place | 2012 Varese | Coxless four |
| Silver medal – second place | 2010 Montemor-O-Velho | Coxless four |

Apostolos Gountoulas (born 4 February 1985 in Servia, Kozani) is a Greek rower. At the 2012 Summer Olympics, he competed in the men's pair with his twin brother, Nikolaos Gkountoulas.

They also won men's lightweight pairs at the 2008 World Championship and the openweight pair at the 2009 and 2011 European Championship. They also won the bronze at the 2009 World Championships.

Together, they were also part of the Greek team that won the men's coxless fours at the 2008 and 2012 European Championship, won the silver medal at the 2010 World Championships and came second in the 2010 European Championships.
