= Domonkos Széll =

Hungarian rower (born 1989)

Personal information
- Born: July 25, 1989 (age 35); Budapest
- Height: 1.84 m (6 ft 1/2 in)
- Weight: 83 kg (183 lb)

Sport
- Country: Hungary
- Sport: Rowing
- Event: Men's pair
- Club: Csepel EK

Domonkos Széll (born 25 July 1989 in Budapest) is a Hungarian rower. He competed at the 2012 Summer Olympics in London in the Men's Pair event together with his teammate Béla Simon. They were eliminated in the repechage round.
