= Nanne Sluis =

Dutch rower (born 1983)

Personal information
- Born: May 13, 1983 (age 41); Willemstad, Curaçao
- Height: 1.93 m (6 ft 4 in)
- Weight: 88 kg (194 lb)

Sport
- Country: Netherlands
- Sport: Rowing
- Event: Men's pair

Nanne Sluis (born 13 May 1983) is a Dutch rower. He competed at the 2012 Summer Olympics in London in the Men's Pair event together with his teammate Meindert Klem. They finished fifth in the B finals, earning them an eleventh place overall.
