= Thomas Peszek =

American rower (born 1985)

Personal information
- Born: January 4, 1985 (age 41)
- Height: 1.91 m (6 ft 3 in)
- Weight: 93 kg (205 lb)

Sport
- Country: United States
- Sport: Rowing
- Event: Men's pair
- Club: Texas Rowing Center
Medal record
Men's rowing
Representing United States
World Championships
| Silver medal – second place | 2017 Sarasota | Eight |
| Bronze medal – third place | 2013 Chungju | Eight |

Thomas Peszek (born January 4, 1985) is an American rower. He participated in the 2012 Summer Olympics in London where he competed in the Men's Pair event together with his teammate Silas Stafford. They finished second in the B finals, earning them an eighth place overall.
