= Dušan Bogičević =

Serbian rower (born 1990)

Medal record

Men's rowing

Representing Serbia

European Championships
Gold medal – first place	2014 Belgrade	M2−
Silver medal – second place	2011 Plovdiv	Double sculls
Bronze medal – third place	2009 Brest	Double sculls

Dušan Bogičević (Serbian: Душан Бочићевић, born 28 April 1990 in Smederevo) is a Serbian rower.
