= Brodie Buckland =

American-born Australian rower

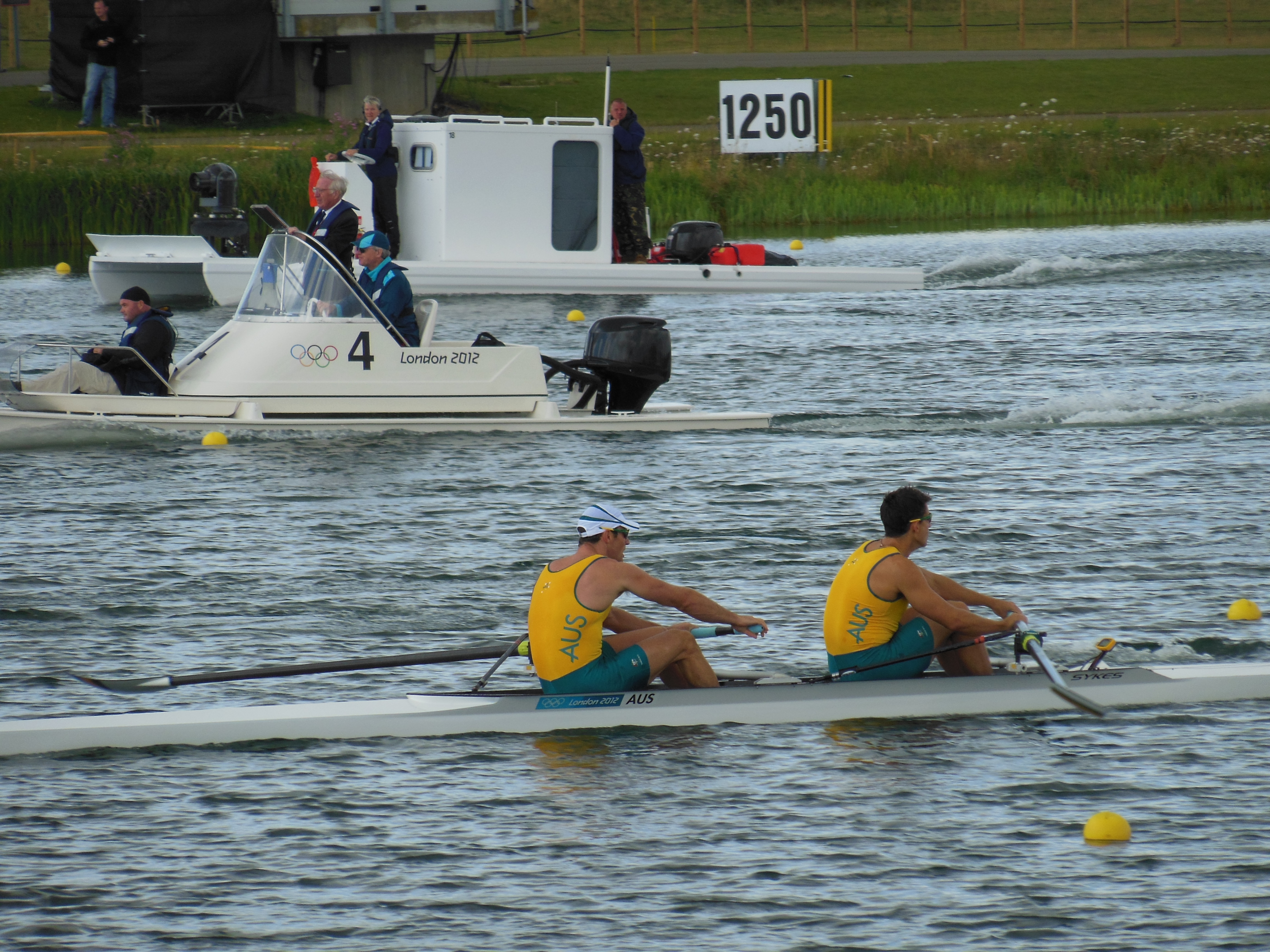
- Final of the coxless pair at the 2012 Summer Olympics

Personal information
- Full name: William Buckland
- Born: 12 December 1983 (age 41); Longmont, Colorado, U.S.
- Home town: Olympia, Washington, U.S.
- Height: 1.96 m (6 ft 5 in)
- Weight: 98 kg (216 lb)

Sport
- Country: Australia
- Sport: Rowing
- Event: Men's pair

William "Brodie" Buckland (born 12 December 1983) is an American-born Australian rower. He participated in the 2012 Summer Olympics in London where he competed in the men's pair event together with his teammate James Marburg. They qualified for the A finals, where they reached a fifth place. He graduated from Harvard University in 2006. Buckland was born in Longmont, Colorado, and raised in Olympia, Washington.
