= Mark O'Donovan =

Irish rower

Personal information
- Born: 7 November 1988 (age 37)

Sport
- Sport: Rowing
Medal record
Men's rowing
Representing Ireland
World Championships
Gold medal – first place	2017 Sarasota	Lwt coxless pair
European Championships
Gold medal – first place	2017 Račice	Lwt coxless pair

Mark O'Donovan (born 7 November 1988) is an Irish lightweight rower. He won a gold medal at the 2017 World Rowing Championships in Sarasota, Florida in the lightweight men's coxless pair.
