= Dorian Mortelette =

French rower (born 1983)

Personal information
- Full name: Dorian Denis Mortelette
- Born: 24 November 1983 (age 42) Armentières, France
- Height: 1.95 m (6 ft 5 in)
- Weight: 90 kg (198 lb)
Medal record
Men's rowing
Representing France
Olympic Games
Silver medal – second place	2012 London	Coxless pair
Bronze medal – third place	2008 Beijing	Coxless four
World Championships
Gold medal – first place	2010 Hamilton	Coxless four
Silver medal – second place	2013 Chungjiu	Coxless pair
European Championships
Gold medal – first place	2008 Marathon	Eight
Bronze medal – third place	2009 Brest	Eight

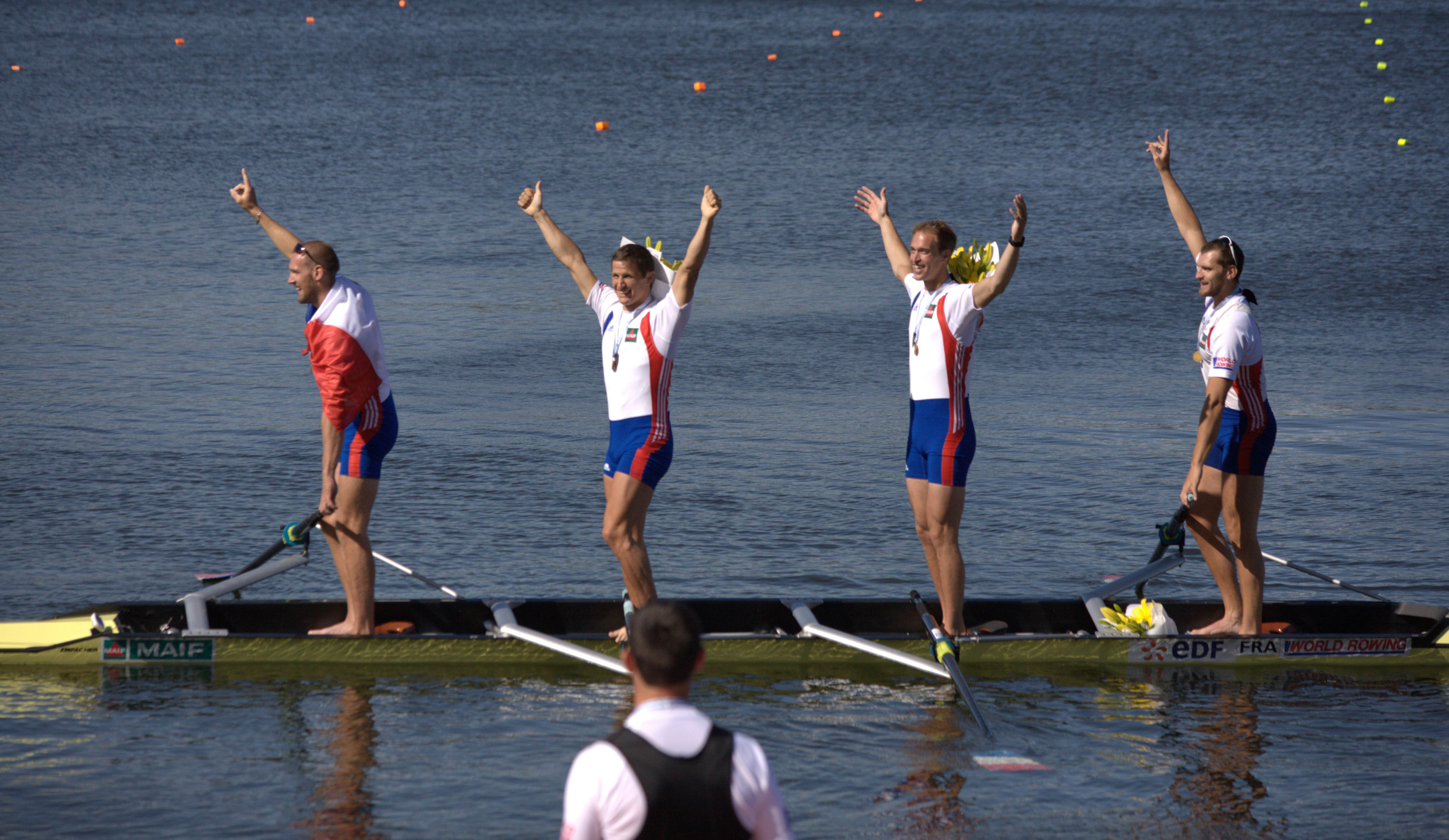
The French M4- team celebrating after their shock win at the 2010 World Rowing Championships in New Zealand

Dorian Denis Mortelette (born 24 November 1983 in Armentières) is a French rower. He competed at the 2008 Summer Olympics, where he won a bronze medal in coxless four and at the 2012 Summer Olympics, where he won a silver medal in the pair with Germain Chardin. He is a member of Boulogne 92 since 2019.
