= Willian Giaretton =

Brazilian rower

Personal information
- Nationality: Brazilian
- Born: 26 September 1990 (age 35)

Sport
- Country: Brazil
- Sport: Rowing
Medal record
Men's rowing
Representing Brazil
World Championships
Bronze medal – third place	2017 Sarasota	Lwt coxless pair
Pan American Games
Bronze medal – third place	2019 Lima	Coxless four

Willian Giaretton (born 26 September 1990) is a Brazilian rower. He competed in the men's lightweight double sculls event at the 2016 Summer Olympics.
