= Shane O'Driscoll =

Irish rower

Personal information
- Born: 10 September 1992 (age 33)

Sport
- Sport: Rowing
Medal record
Men's rowing
Representing Ireland
World Championships
Gold medal – first place	2017 Sarasota	Lwt coxless pair
European Championships
Gold medal – first place	2017 Račice	Lwt coxless pair

Shane O'Driscoll (born 10 September 1992) is an Irish lightweight rower. He won a gold medal at the 2017 World Rowing Championships in Sarasota, Florida with the lightweight men's coxless pair.
