= Germain Chardin =

French rower (born 1983)

Personal information
- Full name: Germain Louis Marcel Chardin
- Born: 15 May 1983 (age 43) Verdun, France
- Height: 1.95 m (6 ft 5 in)
- Weight: 90 kg (198 lb)
Medal record
Men's rowing
Representing France
Olympic Games
Silver medal – second place	2012 London	Coxless pair
Bronze medal – third place	2008 Beijing	Coxless four
World Championships
Silver medal – second place	2013 Chungjiu	Coxless pair
European Championships
Bronze medal – third place	2009 Brest	Eight

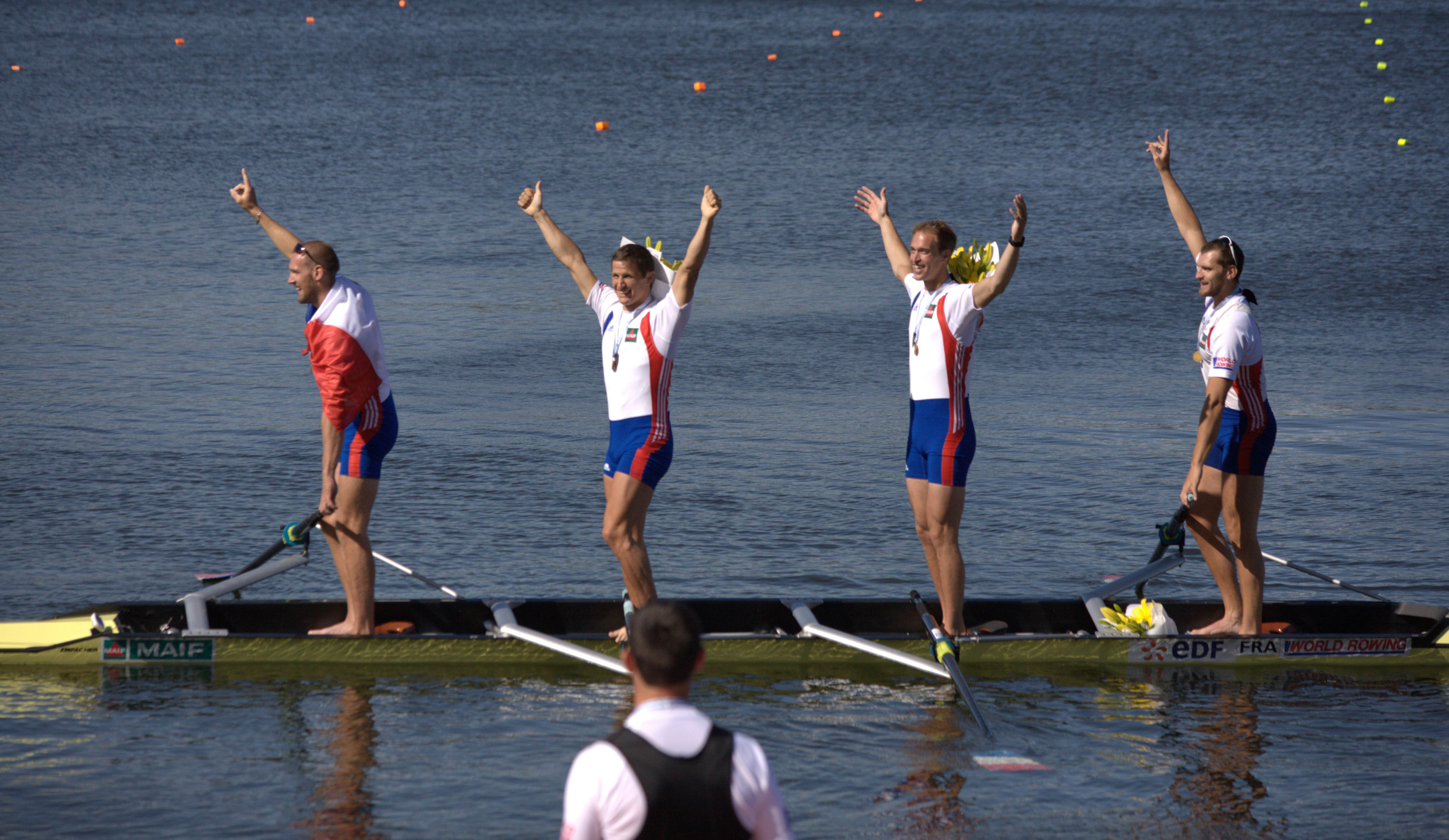
The French M4- team celebrating after their shock win at the 2010 World Rowing Championships in New Zealand

Germain Louis Marcel Chardin (born 15 May 1983 in Verdun) is a French rower. He competed at the 2008 Summer Olympics, where he won a bronze medal in Coxless four. He also competed at the 2010 World Rowing Championships, where he won a gold medal in Coxless four. At the 2012 Summer Olympics, he won silver medal in the men's pair with Dorian Mortelette.
