= Nikolaos Goudoulas =

Greek rower (born 1985)

Medal record

Men's rowing

Representing Greece

World Rowing Championships
Gold medal – first place	2008 Linz	LM2-
Silver medal – second place	2010 Karapiro	M4-
Bronze medal – third place	2009 Poznań	M2-

European Championships
Gold medal – first place	2008 Athens	Coxless four
Gold medal – first place	2009 Brest	Pair
Gold medal – first place	2011 Plovdiv	Pair
Gold medal – first place	2012 Varese	Coxless four
Silver medal – second place	2010 Montemor-O-Velho	Coxless four

Nikolaos Gountoulas (born 4 February 1985 in Servia, Kozani) is a Greek rower. At the 2012 Summer Olympics, he competed in the men's pair with his twin brother, Apostolos Gkountoulas.

They also won men's lightweight pairs at the 2008 World Championship and the openweight pair at the 2009 and 2011 European Championship. They also won the bronze at the 2009 World Championships.

Together, they were also part of the Greek team that won the men's coxless fours at the 2008 and 2012 European Championship, won the silver medal at the 2010 World Championships and came second in the 2010 European Championships.
