= Zhao Meng =

Chinese sculptor and art educator (1957–2019)

- 赵萌
- Born: 28 June 1857; Kaifeng, Henan, China
- Died: 18 July 2019 (aged 62); Jiuquan, Gansu, China
- Occupations: Sculptor; art educator

Zhao Meng (Chinese: 赵萌; 28 June 1957 – 18 July 2019) was a Chinese sculptor and art educator. He served as Vice President and Party Secretary of the Academy of Arts & Design of Tsinghua University.

== Biography ==
Zhao Meng was born on 28 June 1957 in Kaifeng, Henan, China. After graduating from the Central Academy of Arts and Design (中央工艺美术学院) in September 1982, he was hired by the academy as a faculty member.

In 1999, the Central Academy of Arts and Design was merged into Tsinghua University to become Tsinghua's Academy of Arts & Design. Zhao served as Chair of the Department of Sculpture of the academy from 1999 to 2005. From 2005 to 2011 he served as Vice President of the academy, and then as Party Secretary from 2012 to 2014. He also served as an expert advisor to the Beijing Municipal Government.

During the handover of Hong Kong from Britain to China in 1997, the Chinese government presented Zhao's public sculpture "The Forever Blossoming Bauhinia" as a gift to Hong Kong. During the 2008 Summer Olympics in Beijing, Zhao served as art director for image and landscape, and received the national model worker award.

Zhao published about 50 research papers and at least five books, including Sculpture Art in China. He won multiple awards, including the Achievement in Sculpture award by the Ministry of Culture of China.

On 18 July 2019, Zhao died of a sudden illness while on a business trip in Jiuquan, Gansu, at the age of 62.
