= Cesare Gabbia =

Italian rower

Personal information
- National team: Italy
- Born: 6 May 1992 (age 34) Genoa, Italy
- Height: 1.95 m (6 ft 5 in)
- Weight: 85 kg (187 lb)

Sport
- Sport: Rowing
- Club: G.S. Marina Militare
- Start activity: 2009
Medal record
Men's rowing
Representing Italy
European Championships
Bronze medal – third place	2022 Munich	Eight
Event	1st	2nd	3rd
World Championships	0	0	1
European Championships	0	0	1
Total	0	0	2

Cesare Gabbia (born 6 May 1992) is an Italian male rower, bronze medal winner at senior level at the World Rowing Championships and European Rowing Championships.
