= Andrew Judge =

Canadian-born Australian rower (born 1996)

Personal information
- Born: 6 February 1996 (age 30)
- Years active: 2015-current

Sport
- Sport: Rowing
- Club: Sydney University Boat Club

Andrew Judge (born 6 February 1996) is a Canadian-born Australian representative rower. He is a four time Australian U23 national champion who represented at junior, U23 and senior World Championships.

== Club and state rowing ==
Judge's senior club rowing in Australia was from the Sydney University Boat Club.

In 2015 in SUBC colours Judge contested the U23 men's coxless four title and won the U23 men's eight championships title at the Australian Rowing Championships. In 2016 he rowed for the U23 coxless pair championship with Campbell Watts and also in a SUBC eight for the U23 men's eight championship. He contested those same events in 2017 placing 2nd in a composite Sydney Rowing Club/SUBC U23 eight and placing third in the pair. In 2018 he again contested the U23 pair, the U23 eight and also the U23 coxless four. He was victorious in all three crews.

== International representative rowing ==
Judge made his Australian representative debut at the 2014 World Junior Rowing Championships in Hamburg racing in Australia's coxed four to a tenth placing. In 2017 for the World Rowing U23 Championships in Plovdiv he was selected in the Australian coxed four and they rowed to a fifth-place finish. In 2018 he was selected with Jack O'Brien in a coxless pair to compete at both the World Rowing U23 Championships and the senior World Championships. They finished in seventh pace at the U/23 championships and in 13th place at the World Championships in Plovdiv.
