= Lawrence Brittain =

South African rower (born 1990)

Personal information
- Born: 9 November 1990 (age 35) Pretoria, South Africa
- Height: 187 cm (6 ft 2 in)
- Weight: 94 kg (207 lb)

Sport
- Country: South Africa
- Sport: Rowing
Medal record
Men's rowing
Representing South Africa
Olympic Games
Silver medal – second place	2016 Rio de Janeiro	Coxless pair

Lawrence Brittain (born 9 November 1990) is a South African rower. He competed in the men's coxless pair event at the 2016 Summer Olympics. He won the silver medal along with partner Shaun Keeling. Brittain beat cancer in 2015. He competed in the men's four at the 2020 Summer Olympics.
