= Xavier Vela =

Brazilian rower

Personal information
- Nationality: Brazilian
- Born: 7 August 1989 (age 36) Tortosa, Spain

Sport
- Country: Brazil
- Sport: Rowing
Medal record
Men's rowing
Representing Spain
European Championships
Bronze medal – third place	2013 Seville	Lwt coxless pair
Representing Brazil
World Championships
Bronze medal – third place	2017 Sarasota	Lwt coxless pair
Pan American Games
Silver medal – second place	2019 Lima	Coxless pair

Xavier Vela Maggi (born 7 August 1989) is a Spanish-born Brazilian rower. He competed in the men's lightweight double sculls event at the 2016 Summer Olympics.

== See also ==
- Rowing at the 2019 Pan American Games
- Pau Vela
