= Shaun Keeling =

South African rower (born 1987)

Personal information
- Born: 21 January 1987 (age 39) Krugersdorp, South Africa

Sport
- Sport: Rowing
Medal record
Men's rowing
Representing South Africa
Olympic Games
Silver medal – second place	2016 Rio de Janeiro	Coxless pair
World Championships
Bronze medal – third place	2014 Amsterdam	Coxless pair

Shaun Keeling (born 21 January 1987) is a South African rower. He won a silver medal in the men's coxless pair event at the 2016 Summer Olympics. He also competed in the men's coxless pair event at the 2008 Summer Olympics.
