= Théophile Onfroy =

French rower (born 1992)

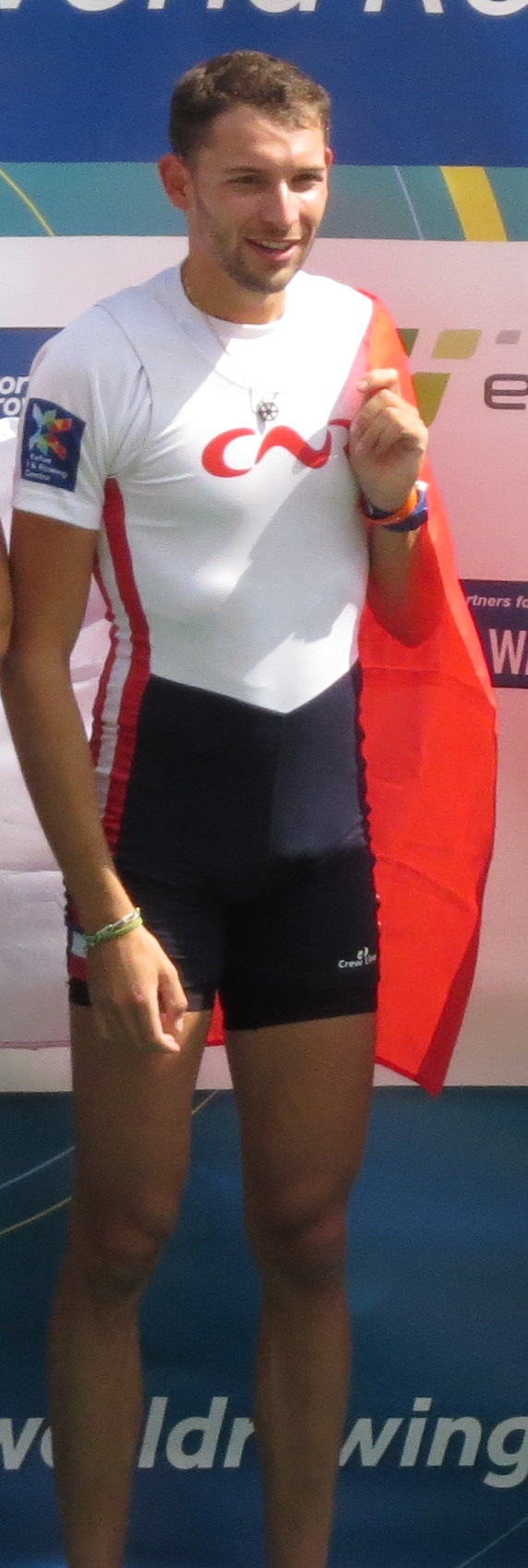

Personal information
- Born: 29 December 1992 (age 33)

Sport
- Sport: Rowing
Medal record
Men's rowing
Representing France
World Championships
Silver medal – second place	2015 Aiugebelette	Lwt coxless pair
Bronze medal – third place	2018 Plovdiv	Coxless pair
European Championships
Silver medal – second place	2015 Poznań	Lwt coxless pair
Silver medal – second place	2017 Račice	Coxless pair
Silver medal – second place	2018 Glasgow	Coxless pair
Bronze medal – third place	2016 Brandenburg	Coxless four

Théophile Onfroy (born 29 December 1992) is a French rower. He competed in the men's coxless four event at the 2016 Summer Olympics.
