= Nikola Stojić =

Serbian rower

Medal record

Men's rowing

Representing Yugoslavia 1998–2003

Representing Serbia and Montenegro 2003–2006

Representing Serbia 2007–present

World Championships
Gold medal – first place	2006 Eton	Coxed pair
Silver medal – second place	2001 Lucerne	Coxless pair
Silver medal – second place	2007 Munich	Coxed four
Bronze medal – third place	1998 Cologne	Coxless pair

European Championships
Gold medal – first place	2007 Poznań	Coxless pair
Gold medal – first place	2013 Seville	Coxless pair
Silver medal – second place	2008 Marathon	Coxless pair
Silver medal – second place	2009 Brest	Coxless pair
Bronze medal – third place	2010 Montemor-o-Velho	Coxless pair
Bronze medal – third place	2011 Plovdiv	Coxless pair
Bronze medal – third place	2012 Varese	Coxless pair

Mediterranean Games
Silver medal – second place	2005 Almería	Single sculls
Silver medal – second place	2013 Mersin	Coxless pair
Bronze medal – third place	2009 Pescara	Coxless pair

Nikola Stojić (Serbian Cyrillic: Никола Стојић, born 15 December 1974 in Belgrade, SR Serbia, Yugoslavia) is a rower from Serbia, who competed in four consecutive Summer Olympics, starting in 2000. He won the silver medal in the men's single sculls event at the 2005 Mediterranean Games in Almería, Spain.

In 2006, the Olympic Committee of Serbia decided to declare him the sportsman of the year.

Stojić graduated from Brown University in 1997. During his time at Brown, Stojić rowed on the school's team.
