= Anders Weiss =

American rower

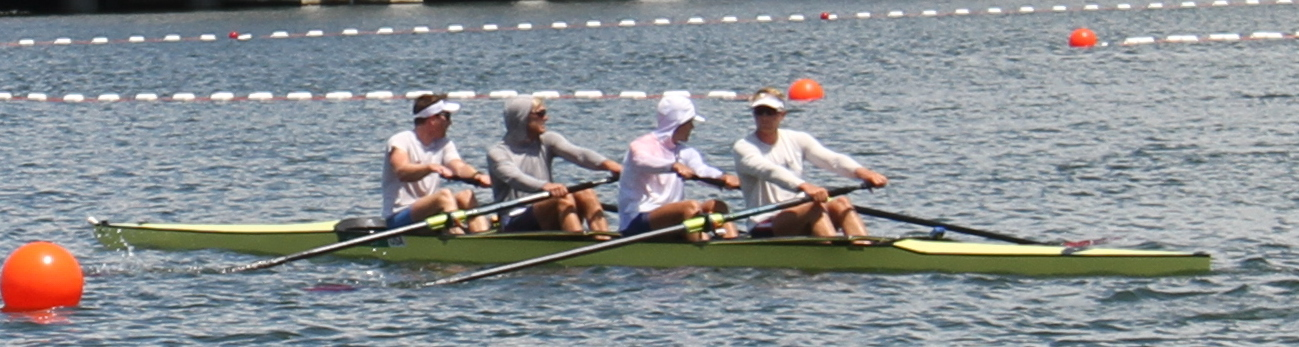
- Weiss (2 seat) at the 2020 Summer Olympics

Personal information
- Born: November 5, 1992 (age 34) Providence, Rhode Island, United States
- Height: 6 ft 5 in (196 cm)
- Weight: 205 lb (93 kg)

Sport
- Sport: Rowing

Achievements and titles
- Olympic finals: Tokyo 2020 M4-

Anders Weiss (born November 5, 1992) is an American rower. He competed in the men's coxless pair event at the 2016 Summer Olympics and the men's coxless four event at the 2020 Summer Olympics.

In 2018 he was selected in the number four seat of the Oxford boat at the 2018 Boat Race while studying at St Hugh's College. In June 2021, Weiss qualified to represent the United States at the 2020 Summer Olympics which were held in Tokyo in 2021.
