= Álex Sigurbjörnsson =

Spanish rower

Álex Sigurbjörnsson Benet (born 13 December 1988) is an Icelandic born-Spanish rower. He was born in Reykjavík. He and Pau Vela placed 13th in the men's coxless pair event at the 2016 Summer Olympics.

== See also ==
- Ebro
