= Valentin Onfroy =

French rower (born 1993)

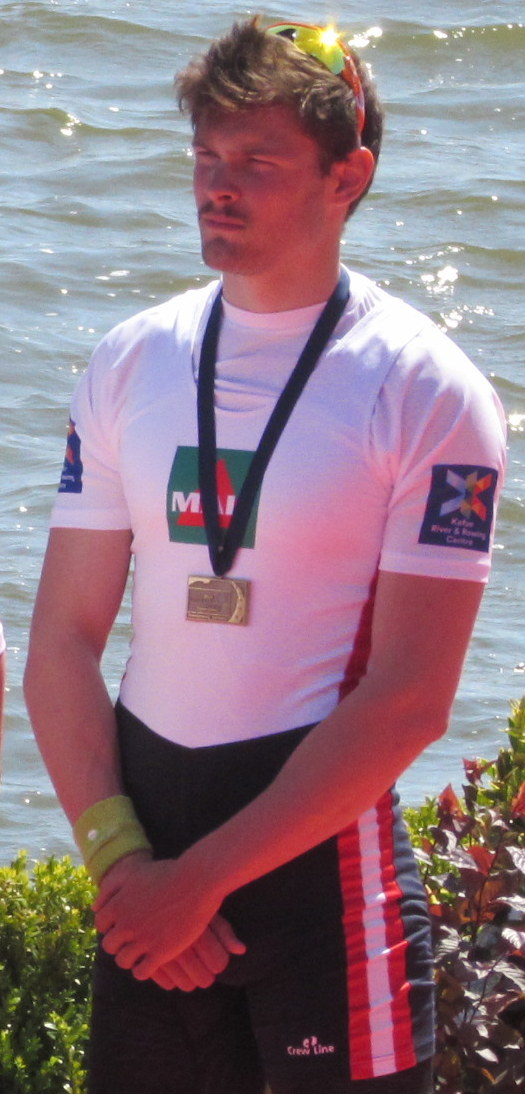
- 2016

Personal information
- Born: 16 November 1993 (age 32) Verdun, France
- Height: 1.95 m (6 ft 5 in)
- Weight: 84 kg (185 lb)

Sport
- Country: France
- Sport: Rowing
- Club: Cercle Nautique Verdunois
Medal record
Men's rowing
Representing France
World Championships
Bronze medal – third place	2018 Plovdiv	Coxless pair
European Championships
Silver medal – second place	2017 Račice	Coxless pair
Silver medal – second place	2018 Glasgow	Coxless pair
Bronze medal – third place	2016 Brandenburg	Coxless four
Bronze medal – third place	2025 Plovdiv	Coxless four

Valentin Onfroy (born 16 November 1993) is a French rower. He competed in the men's coxless four event at the 2016 Summer Olympics.
