= Siarhei Valadzko =

Belarusian rower

Personal information
- Nationality: Belarus
- Born: 19 October 1992 (age 32); Pinsk, Belarus

Sport
- Sport: Rowing

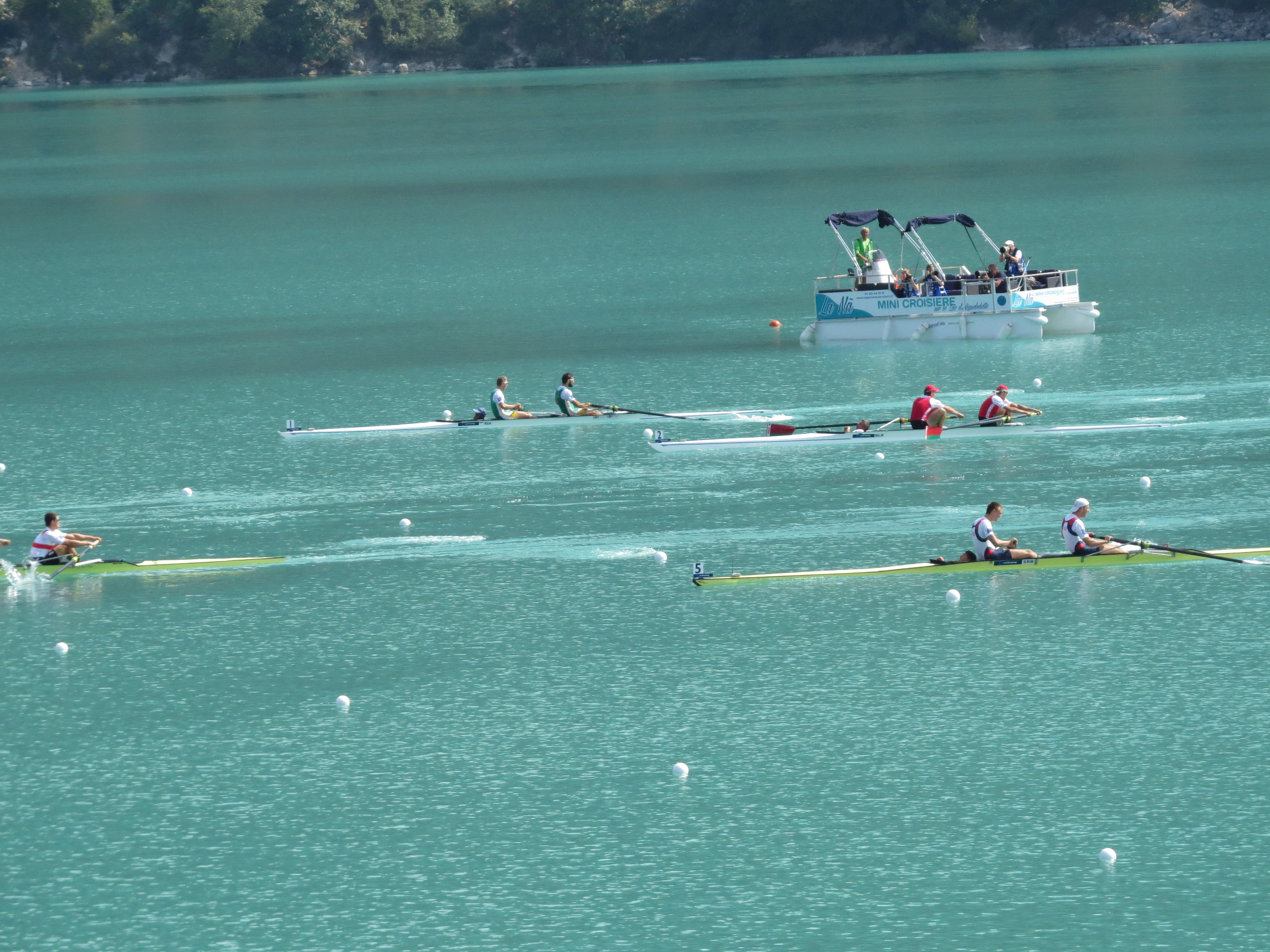
An image of VALADZKO, Siarhei in Aviron 2015 World championship

Siarhei Valadzko (born 19 October 1992) is a Belarusian rower. He competed in the 2020 Summer Olympics.
