= Lukáš Helešic =

Czech rower

Personal information
- Born: 29 January 1996 (age 30)

Sport
- Sport: Rowing

Lukáš Helešic (born 29 January 1996) is a Czech rower. He competed in the men's coxless pair event at the 2016 Summer Olympics.
