= Nenad Beđik =

Serbian rower (born 1989)

Personal information
- Born: 14 April 1989 (age 37) Subotica, SR Serbia, Yugoslavia
Medal record
Men's rowing
Representing Serbia
World Championships
Bronze medal – third place	2015 Aiguebelette	Coxless pair
European Championships
Gold medal – first place	2013 Seville	Coxless pair
Bronze medal – third place	2012 Varese	Coxless pair
Bronze medal – third place	2015 Poznań	Coxless pair
Bronze medal – third place	2017 Racice	Coxless pair
Mediterranean Games
Silver medal – second place	2013 Mersin	Coxless pair

Nenad Beđik (Serbian Cyrillic: Ненад Беђик, born 14 April 1989 in Subotica, SR Serbia, Yugoslavia) is a Serbian rower. He won 6th place in double sculls at the 2007 Junior World Championship. He represented Serbia at the 2012 Summer Olympics, with Nikola Stojic, and the 2016 Summer Olympics, with Milos Vasic.

At World level, he won bronze at the 2015 World Championships with Vasic.

At European level he has won gold in 2013, with Stojic, and bronze in 2012 (with Stojic) and 2015 and 2017 (with Vasic).

He took up rowing at the age of 13 after a rowing coach came to his school and had him try an ergometer. He is a member of Rowing Club Partizan.
