= Pau Vela =

Spanish rower

Personal information
- Nationality: Spanish; Brazilian
- Born: 31 May 1986 (age 40) Ceuta, Spain

Sport
- Country: Brazil
- Sport: Rowing
Medal record
Men's rowing
Representing Brazil
Pan American Games
Silver medal – second place	2019 Lima	Coxless pair

Pau Vela Maggi (born 31 May 1986) is a Spanish-born Brazilian rower. He and Álex Sigurbjörnsson placed 13th in the men's coxless pair event at the 2016 Summer Olympics.

He competed for Spain up to and including 2018, but from 2019 he competed for Brazil.

== See also ==
- Rowing at the 2019 Pan American Games
- Xavier Vela
