= Canoeing at the 2012 Summer Olympics – Women's K-4 500 metres =

Women's canoe sprint K-4 500 metres at the Games of the XXX Olympiad
- Venue: Eton Dorney
- Date: 6 to 8 August
- Competitors: 44 from 11 nations
- Winning time: 1:30.827

Medalists
1st place, gold medalist(s)		Gabriella Szabó; Danuta Kozák; Katalin Kovács; Krisztina Fazekas Zur	Hungary
2nd place, silver medalist(s)		Carolin Leonhardt; Franziska Weber; Katrin Wagner-Augustin; Tina Dietze	Germany
3rd place, bronze medalist(s)		Iryna Pamialova; Nadzeya Papok; Volha Khudzenka; Maryna Pautaran	Belarus

The women's canoe sprint K-4 500 metres competition at the 2012 Olympic Games in London took place between 6 and 8 August at Eton Dorney.

Gabriella Szabó, Danuta Kozák, Katalin Kovács and Krisztina Fazekas Zur, representing Hungary, won the gold medal. Germany's team won silver and Belarus took the bronze.

== Competition format ==
The competition comprised three heats, a semi-finals, and a final. The first boat and second-best in each heat qualified for the final, with the remainder going to the semi-final where the top five boats then qualified for the final.

== Schedule ==
All times are British Summer Time (UTC+01:00)

Date	Time	Round
Monday 6 August 2012	10:39; 11:51	Heats; Semi-finals
Wednesday 8 August 2012	10:44	Finals

== Results ==
=== Heats ===
The first boat from each heat and the fastest runner-up qualified for the final, with the remainder going to the semi-finals.

==== Heat 1 ====
Rank	Canoer	Country	Time	Notes
1	Gabriella Szabó; Danuta Kozák; Katalin Kovács; Krisztina Fazekas Zur	Hungary	1:35.769	Q
2	Jess Walker; Rachel Cawthorn; Angela Hannah; Louisa Sawers	Great Britain	1:37.355	
3	Marie Delattre-Demory; Joanne Mayer; Sarah Guyot; Gabrielle Tuleu	France	1:40.022	
4	Yu Lamei; Li Zhangli; Ren Wenjun; Liu Haiping	China	1:40.661	
5	Antonia Horvat-Panda; Antonija Nađ; Renata Major-Kubik; Marta Tibor	Serbia	1:40.756	
6	Rach Lovell; Hannah Davis; Jo Brigden-Jones; Lyndsie Fogarty	Australia	1:41.794	

==== Heat 2 ====
Rank	Canoer	Country	Time	Notes
1	Carolin Leonhardt; Franziska Weber; Katrin Wagner-Augustin; Tina Dietze	Germany	1:31.633	Q
2	Teresa Portela; Joana Vasconcelos; Beatriz Gomes; Helena Rodrigues	Portugal	1:32.785	Q
3	Iryna Pamialova; Nadzeya Papok; Volha Khudzenka; Maryna Pautaran	Belarus	1:33.676	
4	Yuliana Salakhova; Vera Sobetova; Natalia Podolskaya; Yulia Kachalova	Russia	1:33.680	
5	Marta Walczykiewicz; Aneta Konieczna; Karolina Naja; Beata Mikołajczyk	Poland	1:35.843	

=== Semifinal ===
The top five boats qualified for the final.

Rank	Canoer	Country	Time	Notes
1	Marta Walczykiewicz; Aneta Konieczna; Karolina Naja; Beata Mikołajczyk	Poland	1:30.338	Q, WB
2	Iryna Pamialova; Nadzeya Papok; Volha Khudzenka; Maryna Pautaran	Belarus	1:30.883	Q
3	Yuliana Salakhova; Vera Sobetova; Natalia Podolskaya; Yulia Kachalova	Russia	1:31.824	Q
4	Jess Walker; Rachel Cawthorn; Angela Hannah; Louisa Sawers	Great Britain	1:32.550	Q
5	Marie Delattre-Demory; Joanne Mayer; Sarah Guyot; Gabrielle Tuleu	France	1:33.303	Q
6	Rach Lovell; Hannah Davis; Jo Brigden-Jones; Lyndsie Fogarty	Australia	1:33.671	
7	Antonia Horvat-Panda; Antonija Nađ; Renata Major-Kubik; Marta Tibor	Serbia	1:33.823	
8	Yu Lamei; Li Zhangli; Ren Wenjun; Liu Haiping	China	1:34.004	

=== Final ===
Rank	Canoer	Country	Time
1st place, gold medalist(s)	Gabriella Szabó; Danuta Kozák; Katalin Kovács; Krisztina Fazekas Zur	Hungary	1:30.827
2nd place, silver medalist(s)	Carolin Leonhardt; Franziska Weber; Katrin Wagner-Augustin; Tina Dietze	Germany	1:31.298
3rd place, bronze medalist(s)	Iryna Pamialova; Nadzeya Papok; Volha Khudzenka; Maryna Pautaran	Belarus	1:31.400
4	Marta Walczykiewicz; Aneta Konieczna; Karolina Naja; Beata Mikołajczyk	Poland	1:31.607
5	Jess Walker; Rachel Cawthorn; Angela Hannah; Louisa Sawers	Great Britain	1:33.055
6	Teresa Portela; Joana Vasconcelos; Beatriz Gomes; Helena Rodrigues	Portugal	1:33.453
7	Yuliana Salakhova; Vera Sobetova; Natalia Podolskaya; Yulia Kachalova	Russia	1:33.459
8	Marie Delattre-Demory; Joanne Mayer; Sarah Guyot; Gabrielle Tuleu	France	1:35.299

After winning three straight Olympic silvers in this event, Kovacs finally won her gold, beating out the German team led by Wagner-Augustin, who had won three straight Olympic golds in this event.
