= Serbia at the 2012 Summer Olympics =

- IOC code: SRB
- NOC: Olympic Committee of Serbia
- Website: www.oks.org.rs (in Serbian)

in London
- Competitors: 116 in 15 sports
- Flag bearers: Novak Djokovic (opening); Milica Mandić (closing)
- Medals Ranked 42nd: Gold 1 Silver 1 Bronze 2 Total 4

Summer Olympics appearances (overview)
- 1912; 1920–2004; 2008; 2012; 2016; 2020; 2024; 2028

Other related appearances
- Yugoslavia (1920–1992 W); Independent Olympic Participants (1992 S); Serbia and Montenegro (1996–2006)

Serbia competed at the 2012 Summer Olympics in London. This was the nation's third appearance at the Summer Olympics.

The Olympic Committee of Serbia sent a total of 116 athletes to the Games, 80 men and 46 women, to compete in 15 sports. Volleyball, men's handball, men's water polo were the only team-based sports in which Serbia had its representation in these Olympic games. Among the sports played by the athletes, Serbia marked its Olympic debut in taekwondo.

Notable Serbian athletes featured butterfly swimmer and Olympic silver medalist Milorad Čavić, and world number-one male tennis player and Olympic bronze medalist Novak Djokovic, who was the nation's flag bearer at the opening ceremony. Pistol shooter and Olympic gold medalist Jasna Šekarić, the oldest of the team at age 47, became the first Serbian athlete to compete in seven Olympic games, and played as an individual competitor under five different banners. Two athletes, on the other hand, made their sixth Olympic appearance: rifle shooter Nemanja Mirosavljev, and high jumper Dragutin Topić. Water polo player Dušan Mandić, at age 18, was the youngest athlete of the team.

Serbia left London with a total of four Olympic medals (one gold, one silver, and two bronze). Taekwondo jin Milica Mandić won Serbia's first ever Olympic gold medal as an independent nation. Meanwhile, the men's national water polo team managed to repeat its bronze medal from Beijing. Two other medals were awarded to the athletes in shooting.

== Medalists ==
Medal	Name	Sport	Event	Date
Gold	Milica Mandić	Taekwondo	Women's +67 kg	11 August
Silver	Ivana Maksimović	Shooting	Women's 50 m rifle 3 positions	4 August
Bronze	Andrija Zlatić	Shooting	Men's 10 m air pistol	28 July
Bronze	Serbia men's national water polo team: Slobodan Soro; Aleksa Šaponjić; Živko Gocić; Vanja Udovičić; Dušan Mandić; Duško Pijetlović; Slobodan Nikić; Milan Aleksić; Nikola Rađen; Filip Filipović; Andrija Prlainović; Stefan Mitrović; Gojko Pijetlović	Water polo	Men's tournament	12 August

Medals by sport
Sport	1st place, gold medalist(s)	2nd place, silver medalist(s)	3rd place, bronze medalist(s)	Total
Taekwondo	1	0	0	1
Shooting	0	1	1	2
Water polo	0	0	1	1
Total	1	1	2	4

== Competitors ==
Sport	Men	Women	Total
Athletics	7	7	14
Boxing	1	0	1
Canoeing	6	6	12
Cycling	2	0	2
Handball	15	0	15
Judo	1	0	1
Rowing	6	0	6
Shooting	3	5	8
Swimming	6	2	8
Table tennis	2	0	2
Taekwondo	1	2	3
Tennis	4	2	6
Volleyball	12	12	24
Water polo	13	0	13
Wrestling	1	0	1
Total	80	36	116

== Athletics ==
Serbian athletes qualified in this athletics events (up to a maximum of 3 athletes in each event at the 'A' Standard, and 1 at the 'B' Standard):

Key

- Note–Ranks given for track events are within the athlete's heat only
- Q = Qualified for the next round
- q = Qualified for the next round as a fastest loser or, in field events, by position without achieving the qualifying target
- NR = National record
- N/A = Round not applicable for the event
- Bye = Athlete not required to compete in round

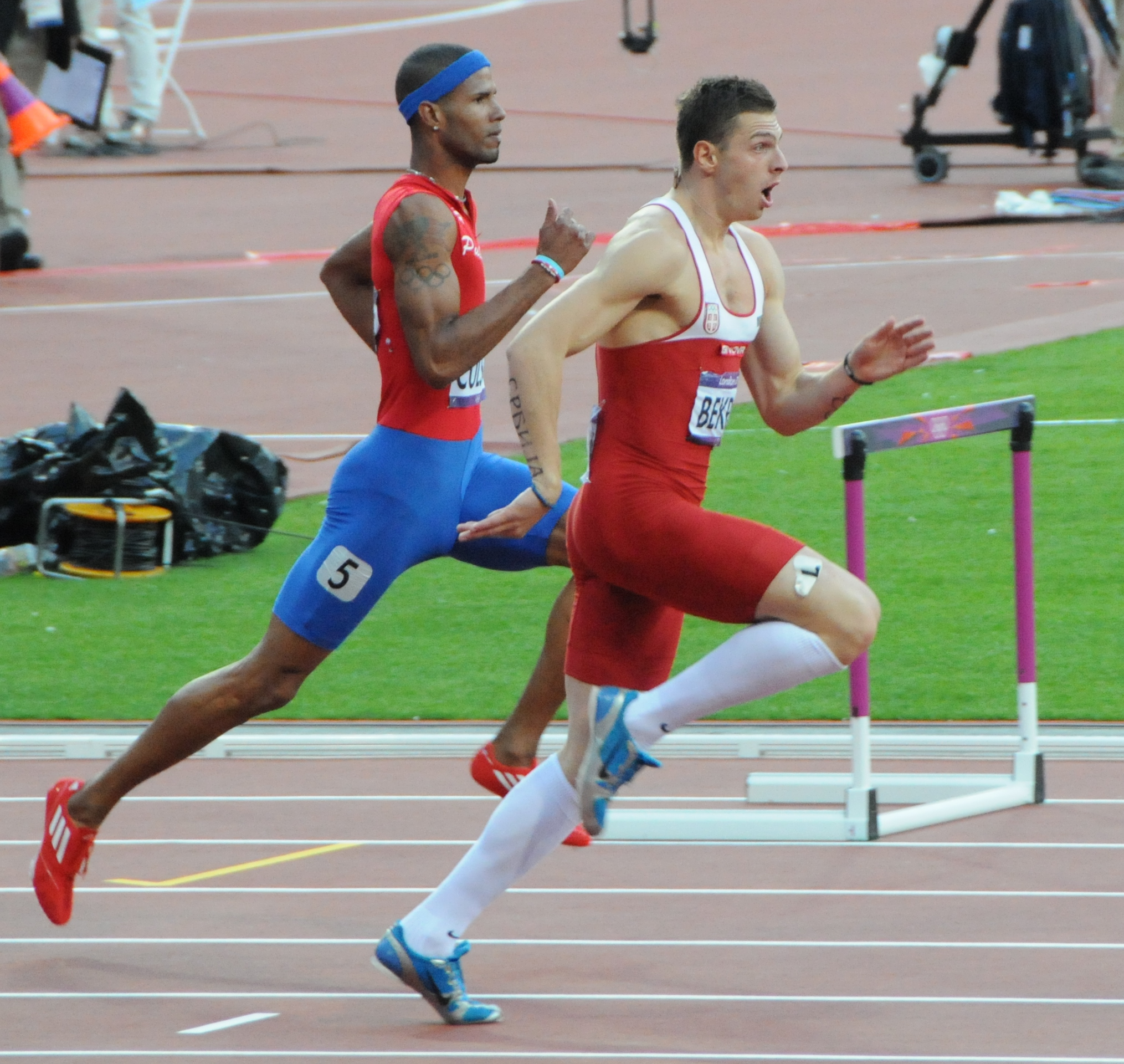
Emir Bekrić raced against Puerto Rico's Javier Culson in the semifinal heats.

Men
Track & road events

Athlete	Event	Heat		Semifinal		Final	
Athlete	Event	Result	Rank	Result	Rank	Result	Rank
Emir Bekrić	400 m hurdles	49.21	2 Q	49.62	4	Did not advance	
Nenad Filipović	50 km walk	—N/a				DNF	
Predrag Filipović	20 km walk	—N/a				1:27:22	48
Darko Živanović	Marathon	—N/a				DNF	

Field events

Athlete	Event	Qualification		Final	
Athlete	Event	Distance	Position	Distance	Position
Asmir Kolašinac	Shot put	20.44	8 q	20.71	7
Dragutin Topić	High jump	NM	—	Did not advance	

Combined events – Decathlon

Athlete	Event	100 m	LJ	SP	HJ	400 m	110H	DT	PV	JT	1500 m	Final	Rank
Mihail Dudaš	Result	10.90	7.53	13.76	1.96	DNS	—	—	—	—	—	DNF	
Mihail Dudaš	Points	883	942	714	767	0	—	—	—	—	—	DNF	

Women
Track & road events

Athlete	Event	Heat		Semifinal		Final	
Athlete	Event	Result	Rank	Result	Rank	Result	Rank
Olivera Jevtić	Marathon	—N/a				DNF	
Marina Munćan	1500 m	4:11.25	11	Did not advance			
Ana Subotić	Marathon	—N/a				2:38:22	71

Field events

Athlete	Event	Qualification		Final	
Athlete	Event	Distance	Position	Distance	Position
Tatjana Jelača	Javelin throw	57.09	26	Did not advance	
Ivana Španović	Long jump	6.41	11 q	6.35	11
Biljana Topić	Triple jump	13.66	25	Did not advance	
Dragana Tomašević	Discus	60.53	19	Did not advance	

== Boxing ==
Men

Athlete	Event	Round of 32	Round of 16	Quarterfinals	Semifinals	Final	
Athlete	Event	Opposition Result	Opposition Result	Opposition Result	Opposition Result	Opposition Result	Rank
Aleksandar Drenovak	Middleweight	Delgado (ECU); W 13–12	Kılıççı (TUR); L 11–20	Did not advance			

== Canoeing ==
=== Sprint ===
Men

Athlete	Event	Heats		Semifinals		Final	
Athlete	Event	Time	Rank	Time	Rank	Time	Rank
Marko Novaković	K-1 200 m	35.212	2 Q	36.293	3 FA	37.094	7
Marko Tomićević	K-1 1000 m	3:30.693	2 Q	3:43.589	7 FB	3:30.754	10
Aleksandar Aleksić; Ervin Holpert; Dejan Terzić; Milenko Zorić	K-4 1000 m	3:21.437	5 Q	2:56.346	7	Did not advance	

Women

Athlete	Event	Heats		Semifinals		Final	
Athlete	Event	Time	Rank	Time	Rank	Time	Rank
Nikolina Moldovan	K-1 200 m	42.383	3 Q	42.394	4 FB	45.064	11
Nikolina Moldovan; Olivera Moldovan	K-2 500 m	1:44.335	3 Q	1:43.586	4 FA	1:48.941	8
Renata Kubik; Antonija Nađ; Antonija Panda; Marta Tibor	K-4 500 m	1:40.756	5 Q	1:33.823	7	Did not advance	

Qualification Legend: FA = Qualify to final (medal); FB = Qualify to final B (non-medal)

== Cycling ==
=== Road ===
Athlete	Event	Time	Rank
Ivan Stević	Men's road race	5:46.37	54
Gabor Kasa	Men's road race	OTL	

== Handball ==
Serbia qualified a team in the men's tournament.

=== Men's tournament ===
Team roster

The following is the Serbia roster in the men's handball tournament of the 2012 Summer Olympics.

Head coaches: Veselin Vuković

No.	Pos.	Name	Date of birth (age)	Height	App.	Goals	Club
1	GK	Dragan Marjanac	26 February 1985 (aged 27)	1.92 m	58	1	(Switzerland) BSV Bern Muri
5	LB	Žarko Šešum	16 June 1986 (aged 26)	1.95 m	106	271	(Germany) Rhein-Neckar Löwen
6	LB	Marko Vujin	7 December 1984 (aged 27)	1.97 m	80	332	(Germany) THW Kiel
7	RW	Ivan Nikčević	11 February 1981 (aged 31)	1.82 m	95	346	(Poland) Wisła Płock
9	CB	Nikola Manojlović	1 December 1981 (aged 30)	1.95 m	32	36	(Slovenia) RK Cimos Koper
11	P	Alem Toskić	12 February 1982 (aged 30)	1.90 m	124	256	(Slovenia) Celje Pivovarna Laško
12	GK	Darko Stanić	8 October 1978 (aged 33)	1.90 m	74	0	(North Macedonia) RK Metalurg
13	LB	Momir Ilić	22 December 1981 (aged 30)	2.00 m	104	355	(Germany) THW Kiel
15	LW	Dobrivoje Marković	22 April 1986 (aged 26)	1.90 m	90	171	(Spain) BM Ciudad Encantada
17	RW	Rajko Prodanović	24 April 1986 (aged 26)	1.86 m	88	199	(Hungary) Pick Szeged
20	LB	Momir Rnić	1 November 1987 (aged 24)	1.97 m	55	83	(Germany) Frisch Auf Göppingen
22	P	Bojan Beljanski	22 June 1986 (aged 26)	2.00 m	36	40	(Germany) Frisch Auf Göppingen
23	CB	Nenad Vučković	23 August 1980 (aged 31)	1.92 m	96	185	(Germany) MT Melsungen
25	CB	Dalibor Čutura	14 June 1975 (aged 37)	1.90 m	23	53	(Spain) CB Ademar León
26	LB	Ivan Stanković	27 April 1982 (aged 30)	1.92 m	45	74	(France) US Créteil

- Reserve player: Žarko Šešum

Group play

Team	Pld	W	D	L	GF	GA	GD	Pts	Qualification
Croatia	5	5	0	0	150	109	+41	10	Quarter-finals
Denmark	5	4	0	1	124	129	−5	8	Quarter-finals
Spain	5	3	0	2	140	126	+14	6	Quarter-finals
Hungary	5	2	0	3	114	128	−14	4	Quarter-finals
Serbia	5	1	0	4	120	131	−11	2	
South Korea	5	0	0	5	115	140	−25	0	

29 July 2012; 16:15	Spain	26 – 21	Serbia	Copper Box, London; Attendance: 4,600; Referees: Abrahamsen, Kristiansen (NOR)
29 July 2012; 16:15	Sarmiento Melián 5	(10–14)	Ilić 6	Copper Box, London; Attendance: 4,600; Referees: Abrahamsen, Kristiansen (NOR)
29 July 2012; 16:15	3× (yellow card) 5× (suspension)	Report	3× (yellow card) 5× (suspension)	Copper Box, London; Attendance: 4,600; Referees: Abrahamsen, Kristiansen (NOR)

31 July 2012; 16:15	Serbia	23 – 31	Croatia	Copper Box, London; Attendance: 4,827; Referees: Horáček, Novotný (CZE)
31 July 2012; 16:15	Vujin 6	(9–13)	Čupić 8	Copper Box, London; Attendance: 4,827; Referees: Horáček, Novotný (CZE)
31 July 2012; 16:15	4× (yellow card) 3× (suspension)	Report	3× (yellow card) 4× (suspension)	Copper Box, London; Attendance: 4,827; Referees: Horáček, Novotný (CZE)

2 August 2012; 19:30	Serbia	25 – 26	Denmark	Copper Box, London; Attendance: 4,504; Referees: Geipel, Helbig (GER)
2 August 2012; 19:30	Vujin 7	(11–13)	Hansen 7	Copper Box, London; Attendance: 4,504; Referees: Geipel, Helbig (GER)
2 August 2012; 19:30	3× (yellow card) 7× (suspension)	Report	2× (yellow card) 3× (suspension)	Copper Box, London; Attendance: 4,504; Referees: Geipel, Helbig (GER)

4 August 2012; 11:15	South Korea	22 – 28	Serbia	Copper Box, London; Attendance: 4,525; Referees: Bonaventura, Bonaventura (FRA)
4 August 2012; 11:15	Jeong Han 6	(10–12)	Nikčević, Toskić 5	Copper Box, London; Attendance: 4,525; Referees: Bonaventura, Bonaventura (FRA)
4 August 2012; 11:15	3× (yellow card) 2× (suspension)	Report	6× (yellow card) 1× (suspension)	Copper Box, London; Attendance: 4,525; Referees: Bonaventura, Bonaventura (FRA)

6 August 2012; 09:30	Hungary	26 – 23	Serbia	Copper Box, London; Attendance: 4,159; Referees: Abrahamsen, Kristiansen (NOR)
6 August 2012; 09:30	Mocsai 9	(9–11)	Ilić, Prodanović 5	Copper Box, London; Attendance: 4,159; Referees: Abrahamsen, Kristiansen (NOR)
6 August 2012; 09:30	4× (yellow card) 3× (suspension)	Report	3× (yellow card) 4× (suspension)	Copper Box, London; Attendance: 4,159; Referees: Abrahamsen, Kristiansen (NOR)

== Judo ==
Athlete	Event	Round of 32	Round of 16	Quarterfinals	Semifinals	Repechage	Final / BM	
Athlete	Event	Opposition Result	Opposition Result	Opposition Result	Opposition Result	Opposition Result	Opposition Result	Rank
Dmitrij Gerasimenko	Men's −90 kg	Kone (CIV); W 1000–0000	González (CUB); L 0002–0011	Did not advance				

== Rowing ==
Men

Athlete	Event	Heats		Repechage		Semifinals		Final	
Athlete	Event	Time	Rank	Time	Rank	Time	Rank	Time	Rank
Nikola Stojić; Nenad Beđik	Pair	6:23.87	4 R	6:26.61	2 SA/B	7:07.78	6 FB	DNS	12
Radoje Đerić; Goran Jagar; Miloš Vasić; Miljan Vuković	Four	5:53.35	5 R	6:01.97	1 SA/B	6:07.41	6 FB	6:11.94	10

Qualification Legend: FA=Final A (medal); FB=Final B (non-medal); FC=Final C (non-medal); FD=Final D (non-medal); FE=Final E (non-medal); FF=Final F (non-medal); SA/B=Semifinals A/B; SC/D=Semifinals C/D; SE/F=Semifinals E/F; QF=Quarterfinals; R=Repechage

== Shooting ==
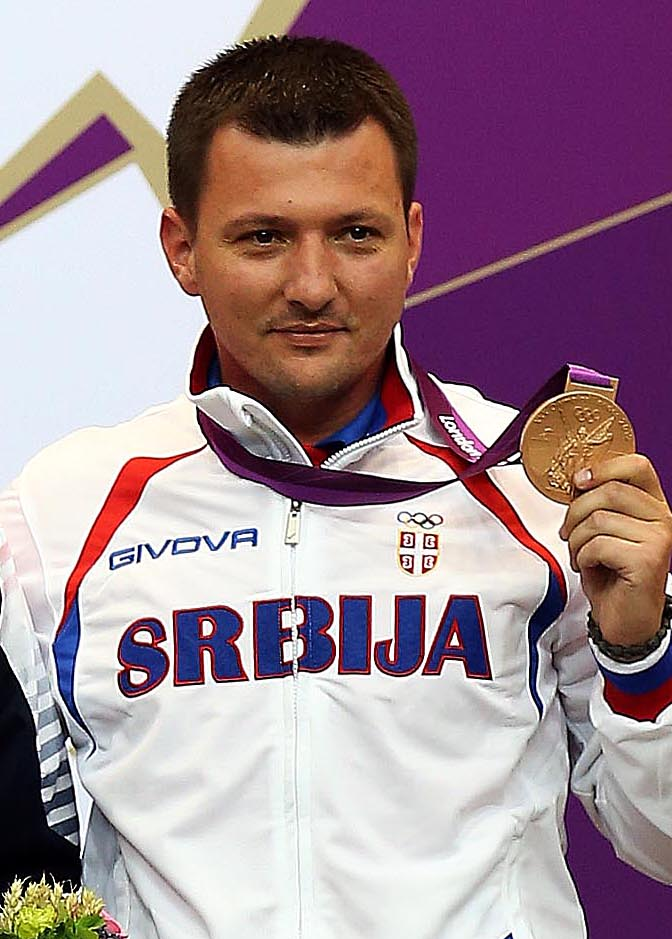
Andrija Zlatić displayed his bronze medal in men's air pistol.

Men

Athlete	Event	Qualification		Final	
Athlete	Event	Points	Rank	Points	Rank
Damir Mikec	10 m air pistol	578	17	Did not advance	
Damir Mikec	50 m pistol	564	16	Did not advance	
Nemanja Mirosavljev	10 m air rifle	591	30	Did not advance	
Nemanja Mirosavljev	50 m rifle prone	595	10	Did not advance	
Nemanja Mirosavljev	50 m rifle 3 positions	1162	23	Did not advance	
Andrija Zlatić	10 m air pistol	585	3 Q	685.2	3rd place, bronze medalist(s)
Andrija Zlatić	50 m pistol	564	3 Q	655.9	6

Women

Athlete	Event	Qualification		Final	
Athlete	Event	Points	Rank	Points	Rank
Andrea Arsović	10 m air rifle	395	15	Did not advance	
Andrea Arsović	50 m rifle 3 positions	577	22	Did not advance	
Zorana Arunović	10 m air pistol	385	5 Q	483.5	7
Zorana Arunović	25 m pistol	583	8 Q	787.3	4
Ivana Maksimović	10 m air rifle	392	37	Did not advance	
Ivana Maksimović	50 m rifle 3 positions	590	2 Q	687.5	2nd place, silver medalist(s)
Jasna Šekarić	25 m pistol	579	18	Did not advance	
Bobana Veličković	10 m air pistol	379	22	Did not advance	

== Swimming ==
Qualifiers for the latter rounds (Q) of all events were decided on a time only basis, therefore positions shown are overall results versus competitors in all heats.

Men

Athlete	Event	Heat		Semifinal		Final	
Athlete	Event	Time	Rank	Time	Rank	Time	Rank
Milorad Čavić	100 m butterfly	51.90	5 Q	51.66	4 Q	51.81	=4
Ivan Lenđer	100 m butterfly	52.40	18	Did not advance			
Đorđe Marković	400 m freestyle	3:55.35	22	—N/a		Did not advance	
Čaba Silađi	100 m breaststroke	1:01.95	31	Did not advance			
Radovan Siljevski	200 m freestyle	1:51.40	32	Did not advance			
Velimir Stjepanović	200 m butterfly	1:54.99 NR	3 Q	1:55.13	8 Q	1:55.07	6
Milorad Čavić; Ivan Lenđer; Radovan Siljevski; Velimir Stjepanović	4 × 100 m freestyle relay	3:18.79 NR	13	—N/a		Did not advance	

Women

Athlete	Event	Heat		Semifinal		Final	
Athlete	Event	Time	Rank	Time	Rank	Time	Rank
Nađa Higl	200 m breaststroke	2:28.38	25	Did not advance			
Miroslava Najdanovski	50 m freestyle	26:46	42	Did not advance			
Miroslava Najdanovski	100 m freestyle	57.45	35	Did not advance			

== Table tennis ==
Athlete	Event	Preliminary round	Round 1	Round 2	Round 3	Round 4	Quarterfinals	Semifinals	Final / BM	
Athlete	Event	Opposition Result	Opposition Result	Opposition Result	Opposition Result	Opposition Result	Opposition Result	Opposition Result	Opposition Result	Rank
Marko Jevtović	Men's singles	Bye	Saive (BEL); L 1–4	Did not advance						
Aleksandar Karakašević	Men's singles	Bye		Zwickl (HUN); L 1–4	Did not advance					

== Taekwondo ==
Athlete	Event	Round of 16	Quarterfinals	Semifinals	Repechage	Bronze Medal	Final	
Athlete	Event	Opposition Result	Opposition Result	Opposition Result	Opposition Result	Opposition Result	Opposition Result	Rank
Damir Fejzić	Men's −68 kg	López (PER); W 5–3	Stamper (GBR); L 3–8	Did not advance				
Dragana Gladović	Women's −57 kg	Jones (GBR); L 1–15	Did not advance		Hamada (JPN); L 2–15	Did not advance		
Milica Mandić	Women's +67 kg	Crawley (SAM); W 16–2	Espinoza (MEX); W 6–4	Baryshnikova (RUS); W 11–3	Bye		Graffe (FRA); W 9–7	1st place, gold medalist(s)

== Tennis ==
Men

Athlete	Event	Round of 64	Round of 32	Round of 16	Quarterfinals	Semifinals	Final / BM	
Athlete	Event	Opposition Score	Opposition Score	Opposition Score	Opposition Score	Opposition Score	Opposition Score	Rank
Novak Djokovic	Singles	Fognini (ITA); W 6–7^{(7–9)}, 6–2, 6–2	Roddick (USA); W 6–2, 6–1	Hewitt (AUS); W 4–6, 7–5, 6–1	Tsonga (FRA); W 6–1, 7–5	Murray (GBR); L 5–7, 5–7	del Potro (ARG); L 5–7, 4–6	4
Janko Tipsarević	Singles	Nalbandian (ARG); W 6–3, 6–4	Petzschner (GER); W 3–6, 6–3, 6–4	Isner (USA); L 5–7, 6–7^{(14–16)}	Did not advance			
Viktor Troicki	Singles	Almagro (ESP); L 4–6, 6–7^{(3–7)}	Did not advance					
Janko Tipsarević; Nenad Zimonjić	Doubles	—N/a	Kližan / Lacko (SVK); W 6–3, 6–3	Nestor / Pospisil (CAN); W 6–4, 6–7^{(5–7)}, 11–9	Benneteau / Gasquet (FRA); L 4–6, 6–7^{(3–7)}	Did not advance		
Novak Đoković; Viktor Troicki	Doubles	—N/a	Brunström / Lindstedt (SWE); L 6–7^{(8–10)}, 3–6	Did not advance				

Women

Athlete	Event	Round of 64	Round of 32	Round of 16	Quarterfinals	Semifinals	Final / BM	
Athlete	Event	Opposition Score	Opposition Score	Opposition Score	Opposition Score	Opposition Score	Opposition Score	Rank
Ana Ivanovic	Singles	McHale (USA); W 6–4, 7–5	Baltacha (GBR); W 6–4, 7–6^{(7–5)}	Clijsters (BEL); L 3–6, 4–6	Did not advance			
Jelena Janković	Singles	S. Williams (USA); L 3–6, 1–6	Did not advance					

Mixed

Athlete	Event	Round of 16	Quarterfinals	Semifinals	Final / BM	
Athlete	Event	Opposition Score	Opposition Score	Opposition Score	Opposition Score	Rank
Ana Ivanovic; Nenad Zimonjić	Doubles	Mirza / Paes (IND); L 2–6, 4–6	Did not advance			

== Volleyball ==
=== Indoor ===
Summary

Team	Event	Group Stage						Quarterfinal	Semifinal	Final / BM	
Team	Event	Opposition Score	Opposition Score	Opposition Score	Opposition Score	Opposition Score	Rank	Opposition Score	Opposition Score	Opposition Score	Rank
Serbia men's	Men's tournament	United States; L 3–0	Tunisia; W 3–1	Germany; L 2–3	Brazil; L 3–2	Russia; L 3–0	5	Did not advance			
Serbia women's	Women's tournament	China; L 3–1	South Korea; L 1–3	Turkey; L 0–3	United States; L 3–0	Brazil; L 3–0	6	Did not advance			

==== Men's tournament ====
Team roster

The following is the Serbian roster in the men's volleyball tournament of the 2012 Summer Olympics.

Head coach: (Montenegro) Igor Kolaković

№	Name	Date of birth	Height	Weight	Spike	Block	2012 club
1	Nikola Kovačević	14 February 1983	1.93 m (6 ft 4 in)	78 kg (172 lb)	350 cm (140 in)	340 cm (130 in)	(Russia) Gubernia Nizhniy Novgorod
2	Uroš Kovačević	6 May 1993	1.97 m (6 ft 6 in)	90 kg (200 lb)	340 cm (130 in)	310 cm (120 in)	(Slovenia) ACH Volley
4	Bojan Janić (c)	11 March 1982	1.98 m (6 ft 6 in)	83 kg (183 lb)	345 cm (136 in)	322 cm (127 in)	(Russia) Fakel
5	Vlado Petković	6 January 1983	1.98 m (6 ft 6 in)	97 kg (214 lb)	325 cm (128 in)	318 cm (125 in)	(Italy) Umbria Volley
7	Dragan Stanković	18 October 1985	2.05 m (6 ft 9 in)	86 kg (190 lb)	343 cm (135 in)	333 cm (131 in)	(Italy) Lube Banca Marche
10	Miloš Nikić	31 March 1986	1.94 m (6 ft 4 in)	79 kg (174 lb)	350 cm (140 in)	330 cm (130 in)	(Italy) Pallavolo Gabeca
11	Mihajlo Mitić	17 September 1990	2.01 m (6 ft 7 in)	90 kg (200 lb)	335 cm (132 in)	320 cm (130 in)	(Serbia) OK Crvena Zvezda
12	Milan Rašić	2 February 1985	2.05 m (6 ft 9 in)	86 kg (190 lb)	340 cm (130 in)	320 cm (130 in)	(Slovenia) ACH Volley
14	Aleksandar Atanasijević	4 September 1991	2.01 m (6 ft 7 in)	84 kg (185 lb)	345 cm (136 in)	321 cm (126 in)	(Poland) Skra Bełchatów
15	Saša Starović	19 October 1988	2.07 m (6 ft 9 in)	89 kg (196 lb)	335 cm (132 in)	321 cm (126 in)	(Italy) Andreoli Latina
18	Marko Podraščanin	29 August 1987	2.04 m (6 ft 8 in)	92 kg (203 lb)	343 cm (135 in)	326 cm (128 in)	(Italy) Lube Banca Marche
19	Nikola Rosić (L)	5 August 1984	1.92 m (6 ft 4 in)	85 kg (187 lb)	328 cm (129 in)	315 cm (124 in)	(Germany) VfB Friedrichshafen

Group play

Pos	Team	Pld	W	L	Pts	SW	SL	SR	SPW	SPL	SPR
1	United States	5	4	1	13	14	4	3.500	427	370	1.154
2	Brazil	5	4	1	11	13	5	2.600	418	379	1.103
3	Russia	5	4	1	11	12	5	2.400	408	352	1.159
4	Germany	5	2	3	5	6	11	0.545	379	388	0.977
5	Serbia	5	1	4	5	7	13	0.538	413	455	0.908
6	Tunisia	5	0	5	0	1	15	0.067	294	395	0.744

29 July 2012; 16:45	United States	3–0	Serbia	Earls Court Exhibition Centre, London; Attendance: 12,000; Referees: Bela Hobor (HUN), Denny Cespedes (DOM)
29 July 2012; 16:45	(25–17, 25–22, 25–21); Results Statistics			Earls Court Exhibition Centre, London; Attendance: 12,000; Referees: Bela Hobor (HUN), Denny Cespedes (DOM)

31 July 2012; 09:30	Serbia	3–1	Tunisia	Earls Court Exhibition Centre, London; Attendance: 10,500; Referees: Denny Cespedes (DOM), Jose Velez (PUR)
31 July 2012; 09:30	(25–15, 25–21, 20–25, 25–18); Results Statistics			Earls Court Exhibition Centre, London; Attendance: 10,500; Referees: Denny Cespedes (DOM), Jose Velez (PUR)

2 August 2012; 09:30	Serbia	2–3	Germany	Earls Court Exhibition Centre, London; Attendance: 14,000; Referees: Bela Hobor (HUN), Rolando Cholakian (ARG)
2 August 2012; 09:30	(25–22, 29–27, 18–25, 20–25, 18–20); Results Statistics			Earls Court Exhibition Centre, London; Attendance: 14,000; Referees: Bela Hobor (HUN), Rolando Cholakian (ARG)

4 August 2012; 22:45	Brazil	3–2	Serbia	Earls Court Exhibition Centre, London; Attendance: 11,000; Referees: Wang Ning (CHN), Simone Santi (ITA)
4 August 2012; 22:45	(22–25, 25–15, 20–25, 25–22, 15–9); Results Statistics			Earls Court Exhibition Centre, London; Attendance: 11,000; Referees: Wang Ning (CHN), Simone Santi (ITA)

6 August 2012; 11:55	Russia	3–0	Serbia	Earls Court Exhibition Centre, London; Attendance: 12,000; Referees: Rolando Cholakian (ARG), Susana Rodriguez (ESP)
6 August 2012; 11:55	(25–15, 25–20, 25–17); Results Statistics			Earls Court Exhibition Centre, London; Attendance: 12,000; Referees: Rolando Cholakian (ARG), Susana Rodriguez (ESP)

==== Women's tournament ====
Team roster

The following is the Serbian roster in the women's volleyball tournament of the 2012 Summer Olympics.

Head coach: Zoran Terzić

№	Name	Date of birth	Height	Weight	Spike	Block	2012 club
2	Jovana Brakočević	5 March 1988	1.96 m (6 ft 5 in)	82 kg (181 lb)	309 cm (122 in)	295 cm (116 in)	(Japan) JT Marvelous
3	Ivana Đerisilo	8 August 1983	1.88 m (6 ft 2 in)	68 kg (150 lb)	277 cm (109 in)	252 cm (99 in)	(Italy) Urbino Volley
4	Bojana Živković	29 March 1988	1.85 m (6 ft 1 in)	70 kg (150 lb)	292 cm (115 in)	284 cm (112 in)	(Switzerland) Volero Zurich
5	Nataša Krsmanović	19 June 1985	1.88 m (6 ft 2 in)	73 kg (161 lb)	294 cm (116 in)	273 cm (107 in)	(Azerbaijan) Rabita Baku
7	Brankica Mihajlović	13 April 1991	1.89 m (6 ft 2 in)	64 kg (141 lb)	282 cm (111 in)	264 cm (104 in)	(Switzerland) Volero Zurich
9	Jovana Vesović	21 June 1987	1.82 m (6 ft 0 in)	68 kg (150 lb)	283 cm (111 in)	268 cm (106 in)	(Romania) Tomis Constanţa
10	Maja Ognjenović (c)	6 August 1984	1.83 m (6 ft 0 in)	68 kg (150 lb)	290 cm (110 in)	270 cm (110 in)	(Italy) Liu Jo Volley Modena
11	Stefana Veljković	9 January 1990	1.90 m (6 ft 3 in)	76 kg (168 lb)	320 cm (130 in)	305 cm (120 in)	(Italy) Asystel Novara
16	Milena Rašić	25 October 1990	1.93 m (6 ft 4 in)	75 kg (165 lb)	303 cm (119 in)	293 cm (115 in)	(France) RC Cannes
18	Suzana Ćebić (L)	11 September 1984	1.67 m (5 ft 6 in)	60 kg (130 lb)	279 cm (110 in)	255 cm (100 in)	(Germany) VfB 91 Suhl
19	Sanja Starović	25 March 1983	1.95 m (6 ft 5 in)	89 kg (196 lb)	317 cm (125 in)	304 cm (120 in)	(Azerbaijan) Rabita Baku
20	Jelena Blagojević	1 December 1988	1.81 m (5 ft 11 in)	68 kg (150 lb)	267 cm (105 in)	242 cm (95 in)	(Italy) Volley Urbino

Group play

Pos	Team	Pld	W	L	Pts	SW	SL	SR	SPW	SPL	SPR	Qualification
1	United States	5	5	0	15	15	2	7.500	426	345	1.235	Quarter-finals
2	China	5	3	2	9	11	10	1.100	475	461	1.030	Quarter-finals
3	South Korea	5	2	3	8	11	10	1.100	449	452	0.993	Quarter-finals
4	Brazil	5	3	2	7	10	10	1.000	447	420	1.064	Quarter-finals
5	Turkey	5	2	3	6	9	11	0.818	434	443	0.980	
6	Serbia	5	0	5	0	2	15	0.133	297	407	0.730	

28 July 2012; 11:30	China	3–1	Serbia	Earls Court Exhibition Centre, London; Attendance: 13,000; Referees: Susana Rodríguez (ESP), Ibrahim Al-Naama (QAT)
28 July 2012; 11:30	(16–25, 25–18, 25–13, 25–12) result statistics			Earls Court Exhibition Centre, London; Attendance: 13,000; Referees: Susana Rodríguez (ESP), Ibrahim Al-Naama (QAT)

30 July 2012; 11:30	Serbia	1–3	South Korea	Earls Court Exhibition Centre, London; Attendance: 7,500; Referees: Brian McDougall (GBR), Simone Santi (ITA)
30 July 2012; 11:30	(12–25, 16–25, 25–16, 21–25) result statistics			Earls Court Exhibition Centre, London; Attendance: 7,500; Referees: Brian McDougall (GBR), Simone Santi (ITA)

1 August 2012; 14:45	Serbia	0–3	Turkey	Earls Court Exhibition Centre, London; Attendance: 11,500; Referees: Susana Rodriguez (ESP), Simone Santi (ITA)
1 August 2012; 14:45	(20–25, 12–25, 21–25) result statistics			Earls Court Exhibition Centre, London; Attendance: 11,500; Referees: Susana Rodriguez (ESP), Simone Santi (ITA)

3 August 2012; 20:00	United States	3–0	Serbia	Earls Court Exhibition Centre, London; Attendance: 9,000; Referees: Karin Zahorcova (CZE), Susana Rodriguez (ESP)
3 August 2012; 20:00	(25–17, 25–20, 25–16) result statistics			Earls Court Exhibition Centre, London; Attendance: 9,000; Referees: Karin Zahorcova (CZE), Susana Rodriguez (ESP)

5 August 2012; 22:00	Brazil	3–0	Serbia	Earls Court Exhibition Centre, London; Attendance: 8,000; Referees: Karin Zahorcova (CZE), Akihiko Tano (JPN)
5 August 2012; 22:00	(25–10, 25–22, 25–16) result statistics			Earls Court Exhibition Centre, London; Attendance: 8,000; Referees: Karin Zahorcova (CZE), Akihiko Tano (JPN)

== Water polo ==
Serbia will participate in the men's tournament.

=== Men's tournament ===
Roster

The following is the Serbian roster in the men's water polo tournament of the 2012 Summer Olympics.

№	Name	Pos.	Height	Weight	Date of birth	2012 club
1	Slobodan Soro	GK	1.96 m (6 ft 5 in)	100 kg (220 lb)	23 December 1978	(Serbia) VK Partizan
2	Aleksa Šaponjić	D	2.05 m (6 ft 9 in)	92 kg (203 lb)	4 June 1992	(United States) CA Golden Bears
3	Živko Gocić	D	1.93 m (6 ft 4 in)	100 kg (220 lb)	22 August 1982	(Hungary) Szolnoki Vízilabda SC
4	Vanja Udovičić	CB	1.95 m (6 ft 5 in)	102 kg (225 lb)	12 September 1982	(Serbia) Radnicki
5	Dušan Mandić	D	1.90 m (6 ft 3 in)	91 kg (201 lb)	16 June 1994	(Serbia) VK Partizan
6	Duško Pijetlović	CF	1.86 m (6 ft 1 in)	95 kg (209 lb)	25 April 1985	(Serbia) Crvena Zvezda
7	Slobodan Nikić	CF	1.96 m (6 ft 5 in)	94 kg (207 lb)	25 January 1983	(Turkey) Galatasaray Waterpolo
8	Milan Aleksić	CB	1.97 m (6 ft 6 in)	100 kg (220 lb)	13 May 1986	(Hungary) Szolnoki Vízilabda SC
9	Nikola Rađen	CB	1.95 m (6 ft 5 in)	103 kg (227 lb)	29 January 1985	(Serbia) Crvena Zvezda
10	Filip Filipović	D	1.97 m (6 ft 6 in)	100 kg (220 lb)	2 May 1987	(Serbia) Radnički
11	Andrija Prlainović	D	1.87 m (6 ft 2 in)	94 kg (207 lb)	28 April 1987	(Serbia) Crvena Zvezda
12	Stefan Mitrović	D	1.94 m (6 ft 4 in)	85 kg (187 lb)	29 March 1988	(Serbia) VK Partizan
13	Gojko Pijetlović	GK	1.94 m (6 ft 4 in)	100 kg (220 lb)	7 August 1983	(Hungary) Ferencvárosi

Head coach: Dejan Udovičić

Group play

Team	Pld	W	D	L	GF	GA	GD	Pts	Qualification
Serbia	5	4	1	0	69	38	+31	9	Quarterfinals
Montenegro	5	3	1	1	54	41	+13	7	Quarterfinals
Hungary	5	3	0	2	65	52	+13	6	Quarterfinals
United States	5	3	0	2	43	44	−1	6	Quarterfinals
Romania	5	1	0	4	48	55	−7	2	
Great Britain	5	0	0	5	28	77	−49	0	

29 July 2012; 15:30	Report	Hungary	10–14	Serbia	Water Polo Arena, London; Referees: Sergi Sanchez (ESP), Massimiliano Caputi (ITA)
29 July 2012; 15:30	Report	Score by quarters: 2–2, 1–3, 3–5, 4–4			Water Polo Arena, London; Referees: Sergi Sanchez (ESP), Massimiliano Caputi (ITA)
29 July 2012; 15:30	Report	three players 2	Goals	Prlainović 5	Water Polo Arena, London; Referees: Sergi Sanchez (ESP), Massimiliano Caputi (ITA)

31 July 2012; 18:20	Report	Serbia	21–7	Great Britain	Water Polo Arena, London; Referees: Gus Pinker (RSA), Kazuhiko Makita (JPN)
31 July 2012; 18:20	Report	Score by quarters: 3–3, 7–2, 6–1, 5–1			Water Polo Arena, London; Referees: Gus Pinker (RSA), Kazuhiko Makita (JPN)
31 July 2012; 18:20	Report	Prlainović 5	Goals	Figes 3	Water Polo Arena, London; Referees: Gus Pinker (RSA), Kazuhiko Makita (JPN)

2 August 2012; 14:10	Report	Montenegro	11–11	Serbia	Water Polo Arena, London; Referees: Georgios Stavridis (GRE), Massimiliano Caputi (ITA)
2 August 2012; 14:10	Report	Score by quarters: 1–3, 2–1, 5–4, 3–3			Water Polo Arena, London; Referees: Georgios Stavridis (GRE), Massimiliano Caputi (ITA)
2 August 2012; 14:10	Report	Ivović 3	Goals	Prlainović 5	Water Polo Arena, London; Referees: Georgios Stavridis (GRE), Massimiliano Caputi (ITA)

4 August 2012; 19:40	Report	Serbia	11–6	United States	Water Polo Arena, London; Referees: Sergi Sanchez (ESP), Massimiliano Caputi (ITA)
4 August 2012; 19:40	Report	Score by quarters: 4–1, 1–2, 3–1, 3–2			Water Polo Arena, London; Referees: Sergi Sanchez (ESP), Massimiliano Caputi (ITA)
4 August 2012; 19:40	Report	Udovičić 3	Goals	Bailey 2	Water Polo Arena, London; Referees: Sergi Sanchez (ESP), Massimiliano Caputi (ITA)

6 August 2012; 14:10	Report	Romania	4–12	Serbia	Water Polo Arena, London; Referees: Ulrich Spiegel (GER), Steven Rotsart (USA)
6 August 2012; 14:10	Report	Score by quarters: 0–3, 1–3, 0–4, 3–2			Water Polo Arena, London; Referees: Ulrich Spiegel (GER), Steven Rotsart (USA)
6 August 2012; 14:10	Report	four players 1	Goals	Nikić, Mitrović 3	Water Polo Arena, London; Referees: Ulrich Spiegel (GER), Steven Rotsart (USA)

Quarterfinal

8 August 2012; 15:50	Report	Australia	8–11	Serbia	Water Polo Arena, London; Referees: Sergi Sanchez (ESP), Steven Rotsart (USA)
8 August 2012; 15:50	Report	Score by quarters: 3–2, 4–2, 1–2, 0–5			Water Polo Arena, London; Referees: Sergi Sanchez (ESP), Steven Rotsart (USA)
8 August 2012; 15:50	Report	Campbell, Beadsworth 2	Goals	Filipović 3	Water Polo Arena, London; Referees: Sergi Sanchez (ESP), Steven Rotsart (USA)

Semifinal

10 August 2012; 19:50	Report	Italy	9–7	Serbia	Water Polo Arena, London; Referees: Sergi Sanchez (ESP), Adrian Alexandrescu (ROU)
10 August 2012; 19:50	Report	Score by quarters: 4–2, 2–2, 2–1, 1–2			Water Polo Arena, London; Referees: Sergi Sanchez (ESP), Adrian Alexandrescu (ROU)
10 August 2012; 19:50	Report	Gallo 3	Goals	Udovičić 3	Water Polo Arena, London; Referees: Sergi Sanchez (ESP), Adrian Alexandrescu (ROU)

Bronze medal match

12 August 2012; 14:30	Report	Montenegro	11–12	Serbia (bronze)	Water Polo Arena, London; Referees: Massimiliano Caputi (ITA), Georgios Stavridis (GRE)
12 August 2012; 14:30	Report	Score by quarters: 2–3, 3–1, 5–4, 1–4			Water Polo Arena, London; Referees: Massimiliano Caputi (ITA), Georgios Stavridis (GRE)
12 August 2012; 14:30	Report	Ivović 3	Goals	Filipović 3	Water Polo Arena, London; Referees: Massimiliano Caputi (ITA), Georgios Stavridis (GRE)

== Wrestling ==
Key:

- VT - Victory by Fall.
- PP - Decision by Points - the loser with technical points.
- PO - Decision by Points - the loser without technical points.

Men's Greco-Roman

Athlete	Event	Qualification	Round of 16	Quarterfinal	Semifinal	Repechage 1	Repechage 2	Final / BM	
Athlete	Event	Opposition Result	Opposition Result	Opposition Result	Opposition Result	Opposition Result	Opposition Result	Opposition Result	Rank
Aleksandar Maksimović	−66 kg	Bayakhmetov (KAZ); L 0–3 ^{PO}	Did not advance						16

== See also ==
- Serbia at the 2012 Summer Paralympics
