= Hungarians in Serbia =

Ethnic group

Мађари у Србији Szerbiai magyarok
- Ethnic flag of Hungarians in Serbia

Total population
- 184,442 (2022)

Regions with significant populations
- Vojvodina: 182,321

Languages
- Hungarian and Serbian

Religion
- Catholicism, Protestantism

Hungarians are a recognized ethnic minority in Serbia. According to data from the 2022 census, the population of ethnic Hungarians in Serbia is 184,442, constituting 2.8% of the total population; they are the second-largest ethnic group in the country after Serbs and the largest ethnic minority group. The vast majority of them live in the province of Vojvodina, where they make up 10.5% of population.

The overwhelming majority of Hungarians in Serbia are Catholics, while some 6% are Protestant (mostly Calvinist).

== History ==
=== Kingdom of Hungary ===
Present-day northern Serbia were included in the medieval Kingdom of Hungary in the 10th century, and Hungarians then began to settle in the region, which before that time was mostly populated by West Slavs. During Hungarian rule of the area, from 10th to 16th century, Hungarians formed the largest part of population in the northern part of the present-day Vojvodina, while southern parts were populated by Slavic peoples.

=== Ottoman Empire ===
Following the Ottoman conquest and inclusion of Vojvodina into the Ottoman Empire in the 16th century, most Hungarians fled the region. During Ottoman rule, the Vojvodina region was mostly populated by Serbs (Great Migrations of the Serbs) and Muslim Slavs.

=== Habsburg monarchy ===
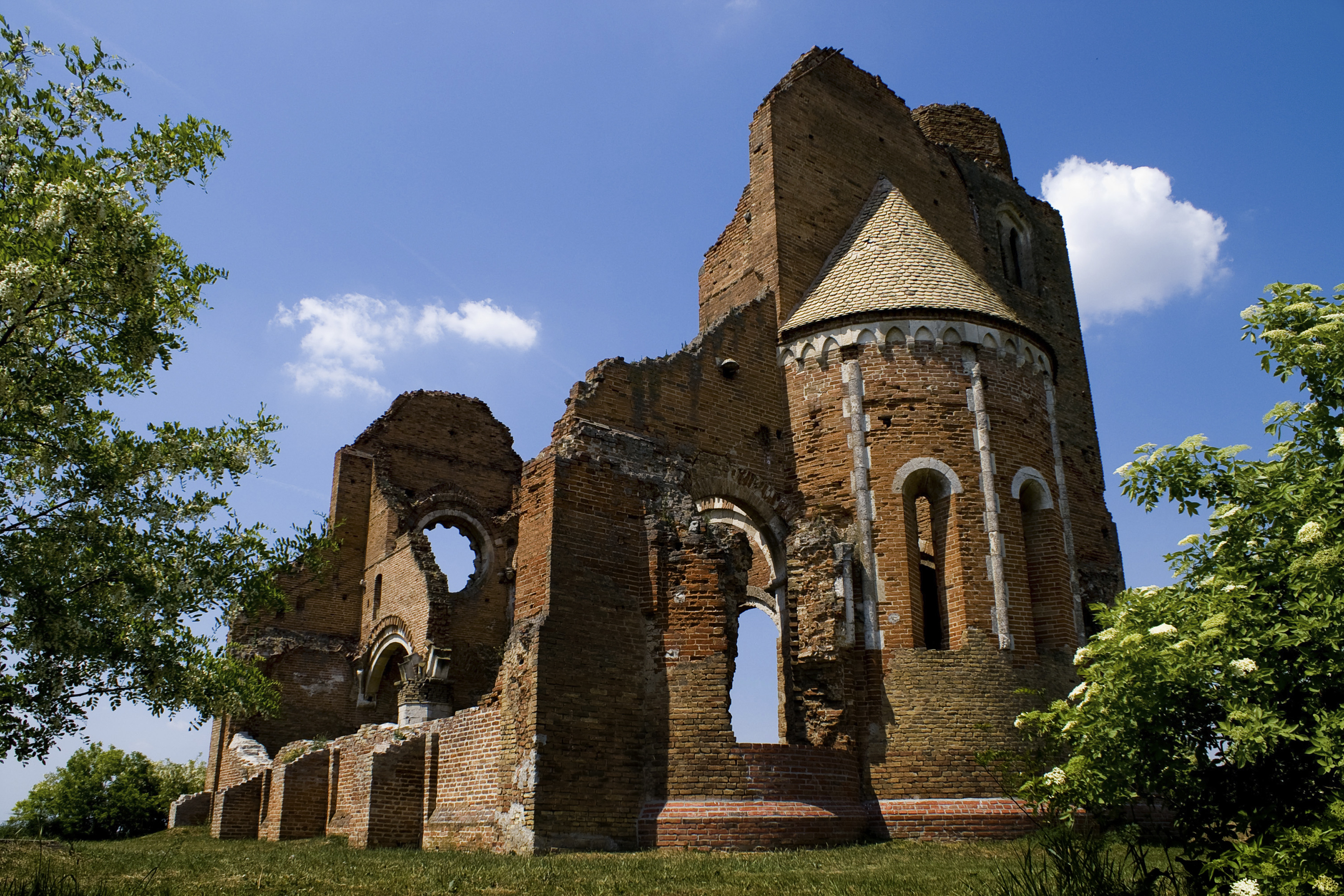
Ruins of Arača

Hungarians started to settle back to the territory after the Ottomans were driven out, with the establishment of the Habsburg administration at the beginning of the 18th century, mostly after the Peace of Passarowitz. Count Imre Csáky settled Hungarians in his possessions in Bačka in 1712. In 1745, Hungarian colonists settled in Senta, in 1750 in Bačka Topola, in 1752 in Doroslovo, in 1772 in Bogojevo, in 1760 in Kanjiža, in 1764 in Mali Iđoš, in 1767 in Bačko Petrovo Selo, in 1776 in Martonoš, in 1786 in Pačir and Ostojićevo, in 1787 in Rumenka, and in 1789 in Feketić. Between 1782 and 1786, Hungarians settled in Crvenka and Stara Moravica, and in 1794 in Kula.

Catholic Hungarians originated mostly from Transdanubia, while those of Protestant faith originated mostly from Alföld. Between 1751 and 1753, Hungarians (originating mostly from Szeged and Jászság) settled in Mol and Ada. In 1764–1767, Hungarians settled in Subotica, Bajmok and Čantavir, and in 1770 again in Kanjiža, Mol, Ada and Bačko Petrovo Selo, as well as in Bačko Gradište, Srbobran and Turija.

In Banat, the settling of Hungarians started later. In 1784 Hungarians settled in Padej and Nakovo, in 1776 in Torda, in 1786 in Novi Itebej, in 1796 in Novo Miloševo and Čoka, in 1782 in Banatski Monoštor, in 1798 in Nova Crnja, in 1773 in Krstur and Majdan, in 1774 in Debeljača, in 1755–1760 in Zrenjanin, and in 1766 in Vršac. In 1790, 14 Hungarian families from Transylvania settled in Banat.

In the 19th century, the Hungarian expansion increased. From the beginning of the century, small groups of Hungarian settlers from Alföld had been constantly immigrating to Bačka. In the first half of the 19th century, larger and smaller groups of the colonists settled in Mol (in 1805), as well as in Bačko Gradište, Temerin and Novi Sad (in 1806). In 1884, Hungarian colonists settled in Šajkaška and in Mali Stapar near Sombor. In 1889, Hungarians were settled in Svilojevo near Apatin and in 1892 in Bogojevo, while another group settled in Gomboš in 1898. Many Hungarian settlers from Gomboš moved to Bačka Palanka. After the abolishment of the Military Frontier, Hungarian colonists were settled in Potisje: Čurug, Žabalj, Šajkaš, Titel, and Mošorin. In 1883 around thousand Székely Hungarians settled in Kula, Kanjiža, Bečej, and Titel.

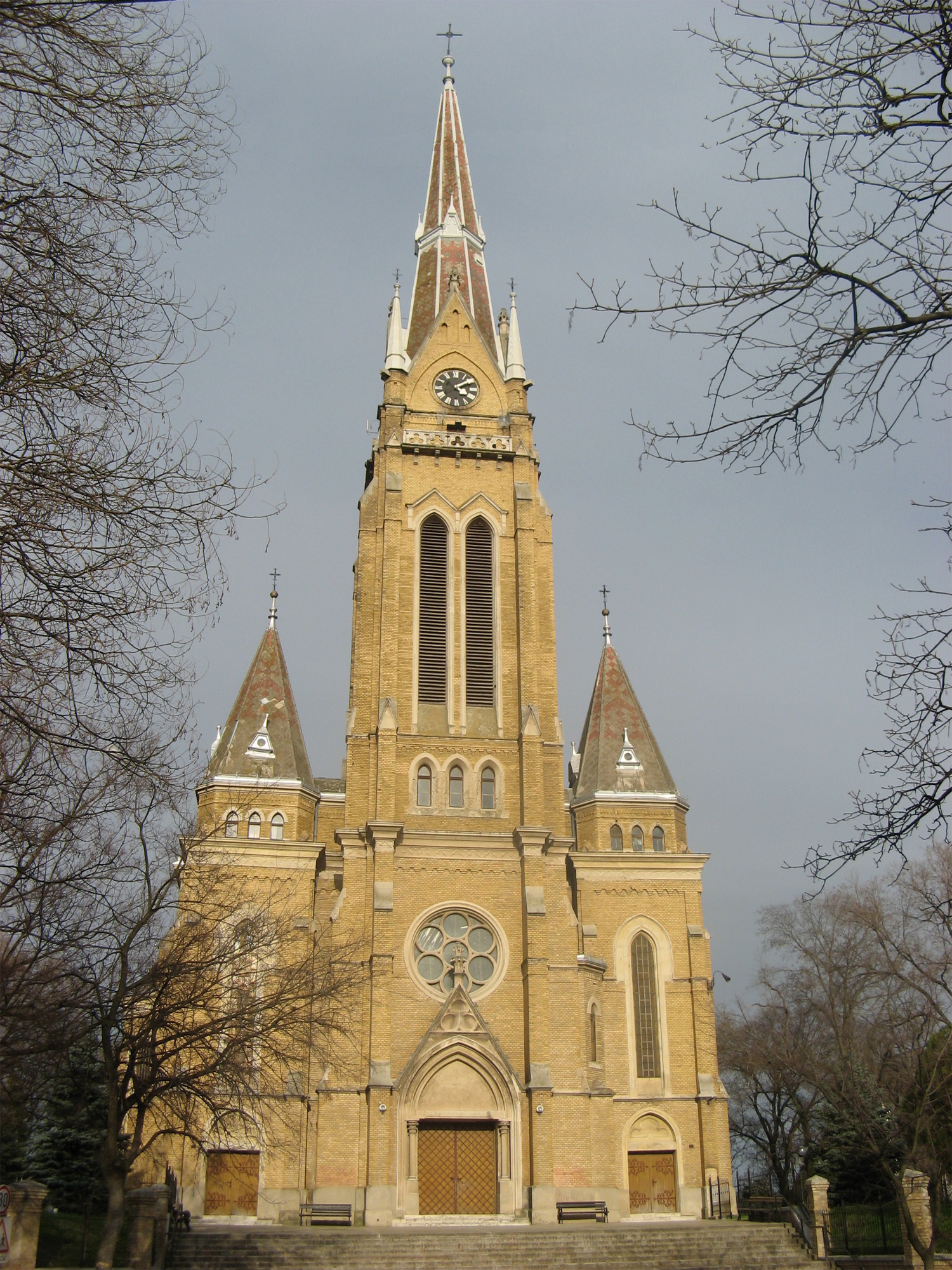
Sarlós Boldogasszony Church in Bačka Topola

In 1800, smaller groups of Hungarian colonists from Transdanubia settled in Čoka, while in the same time colonists from Csanád and Csongrád counties settled in the area around Srpski Itebej and Srpska Crnja, where they at first lived in scattered small settlements. Later they formed one single settlement – Mađarska Crnja. In 1824, one group of colonists from Čestereg also settled in Mađarska Crnja. In 1829 Hungarians settled in Mokrin, and in 1880 an even larger number of Hungarians settled in this municipality. In 1804, Hungarian colonists from Csongrád County settled in Filić, as well as in Sajan and Torda. Even a larger group of Hungarians from Csongrád settled in 1804 in Debeljača. In 1817–1818 Hungarians settled in Bikač, and in 1820–1840 smaller groups of Hungarians settled in Novi Bečej. In 1826, colonists from Jászság and Kunság settled in Arač near Novo Miloševo. In 1830, Hungarians from Alföld settled in Veliki Lec, in 1831 in Ostojićevo, in 1832 in Malenčino Selo near Veliki Gaj, in 1839 and 1870 in Padej, in 1840 in Jermenovci and Mihajlovo, in 1840–1841 in Banatski Dvor, in 1841 in Hetin, in 1859 in Sanad, in 1869 in Skorenovac, and in 1890 in Mužlja. In 1883-1886, Székely Hungarians from Bukovina were settled in Vojlovica, Ivanovo, and Skorenovac. The total number of Székely colonists was 3,520.

In the southern region of Syrmia, the first Hungarian settlers moved there during the 1860s from neighbouring counties, especially from Bačka.

According to the 1900 census, the Hungarians were the largest ethnic group in the Bács-Bodrog County and made up 42.7% in the population (the second largest were Germans with 25.1%, and the third largest group were Serbs with 18.2%). The Hungarians were third largest group in the Torontál County (largely, present-day Serbian Banat) with 18.8% (after Serbs with 31.5% and Germans with 30.2%). According to data from the 1910 census, Hungarians were the largest ethnicity in the Bács-Bodrog County with 44.8% in the population (followed by Germans with 23.5% and Serbs with 17.9%), and the third largest in the Torontál County with 20.9% (followed by Serbs with 32.5% and Germans with 26.9%).

=== Kingdom of Yugoslavia ===
After World War I, the new borders established by the Treaty of Trianon in 1920 put an end to Hungarian immigration to the area. The present-day Vojvodina was included into the newly formed Kingdom of Serbs, Croats, and Slovenes (later known as the Kingdom of Yugoslavia), and many Hungarians wanted to live in the post-Trianon Hungarian state; thus, some of them immigrated to Hungary, which was a destination for several emigration waves of Hungarians from Vojvodina. As a result, the interwar period was generally marked by a stagnation of the Hungarian population: they numbered 363,000 (1921 census) and 376,000 (1931 census), constituting about 23-24% of the entire population of the territory of present-day Vojvodina.

=== World War II ===
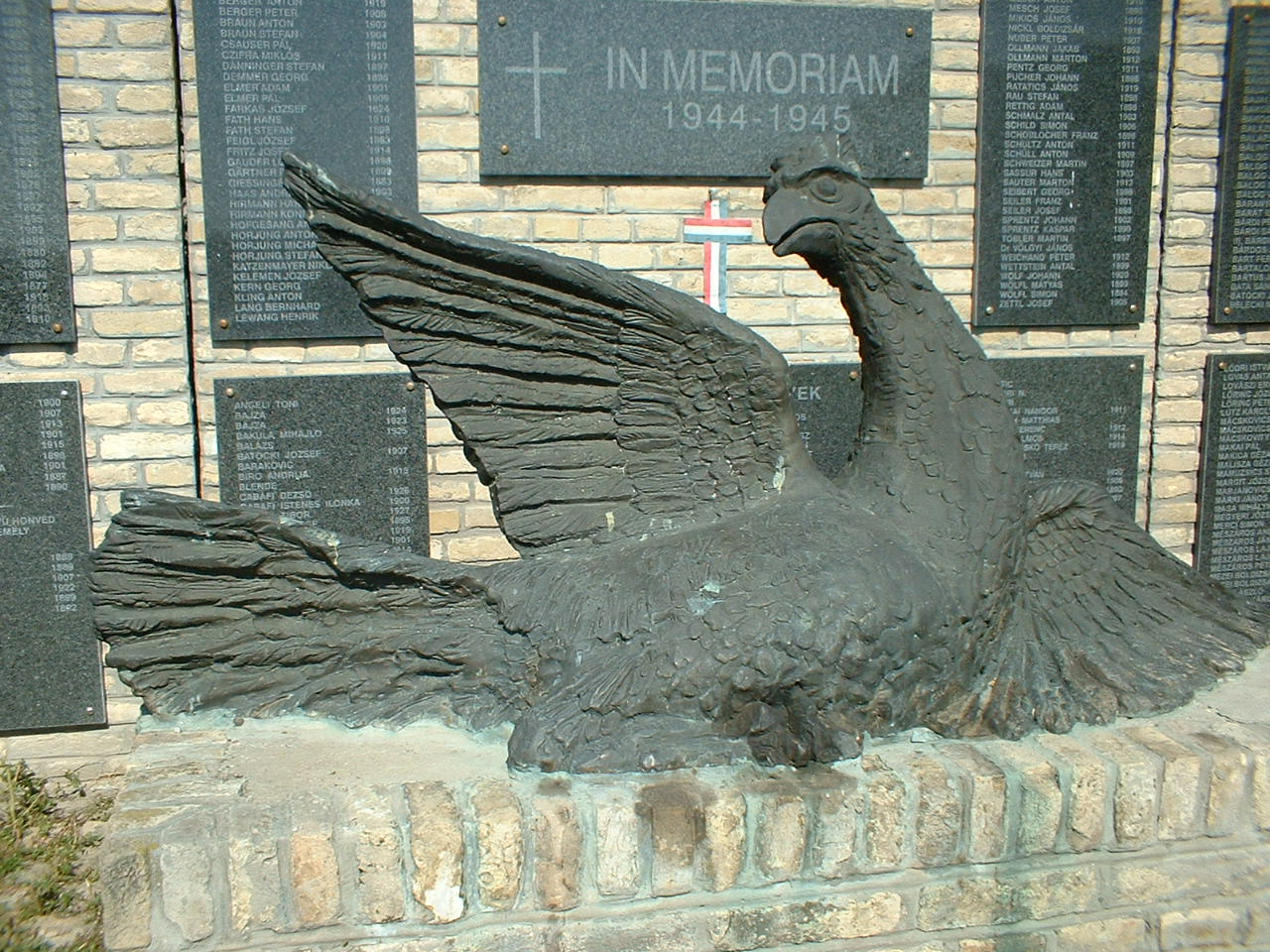
The Hungarian Civil Victims in the World War II Memorial in Subotica

The outbreak of the World War II caused ethnic tensions between the Hungarian and Serb communities. Nazi Germany invaded Yugoslavia, which led to Hungarian occupation of territories in Bačka, Baranja, Međimurje and Prekmurje, seeking to reverse the effects of the Trianon Treaty.

The Kingdom of Hungary under the authoritarian and irredentist government of Regent Miklós Horthy was a signatory Tripartite Pact (and so one of the so-called Axis powers). Importantly, it had allowed for the passage of German troops bound for the invasion of Yugoslavia through its territory. This was despite the 1940 Treaty of Perpetual Friendship, and prompting the Prime Minister Pál Teleki to take his own life. The Hungarian miltary invasion was miltarily symbolic in comparison, beginning after a week, on the same day as the German capture of Belgrade.

Hungary formally annexed the occupied region, in addition to encouring new Hungarian settlers, causing the number of Hungarians in the area grew considerably. In contrast, at the same time, many Serbs were expelled from Bačka. Under Hungarian authority, 19573 people were killed in Bačka, of which the majority of victims were of Serb, Jewish, and Roma descent. The brutal conduct of the Hungarian occupying forces, specifically of the Royal Hungarian Army and Royal Hungarian Gendarmerie antagonized the local Serb community and further contributed to ethnic tensions in the area.

Although the majority of the local ethnic Hungarian population generally identified with or supported Hungarian occupation authorities, some actively opposed them, even joining the Yugoslav Partisans organized under the Communist Party of Yugoslavia. In some areas (such as Bačka Topola and Senta), the majority of the local CPY members were ethnic Hungarians. In Subotica, the Party Secretary and most of the leadership were either ethnic Hungarians or Hungarian-speaking Jews. In the Bačka Topola municipality, 95% of Communists were ethnic Hungarians. One of the leaders of the Yugoslav Partisans was Erne Kisz, an ethnic Hungarian, who was captured by the authorities, sentenced to death in Szeged and executed.

Among the other actions of the Partisans, the first corn stacks were burned near Futog by five Communists, of whom two were ethnic Hungarians – brothers Antal Nemet and Đerđ Nemet. Antal was killed there, together with a Serb Partisan, fighting against Hungarian Gendarmes. At the same time, his brother was captured and killed in Novi Sad because he refused to reveal any information about the resistance movement. The corn stacks were soon also burned near Subotica. The communists that burned these corn stacks were arrested, tortured and sent to court. Two of them were sentenced to death (Ferenc Hegediš and Jožef Liht), while five others were sentenced to prison because they were underage.

The Hungarian occupation authorities also arrested a sizeable number of Hungarian communists in Bačka Topola, Čantavir, Senta, Subotica, and Novi Sad. Many of them were sent to the investigation centre in Bačka Topola, where some were killed, while some committed suicide. Because of the size of the communist movement among Hungarians, new investigation centers were opened in Čantavir, Senta, Ada, and Subotica. In the investigation centre in Subotica, almost 1000 people were tortured, and part of them killed, among whom were Maćaš Vuković and Daniel Szabo. Among those communists sentenced to death were Otmar Majer, Rokuš Šimoković, and Ištvan Lukač from Subotica, Peter Molnar from Senta, as well as Đula Varga, Rudi Klaus, Pal Karas, and Janoš Koči from Novi Sad. In Bačko Petrovo Selo, Mihalj Šamu was killed during his attempt to escape. These actions of the Axis authorities were a decisive blow to the resistance movement in Bačka, especially on its Hungarian component, which could not recover until the end of the war.

In 1944, the Soviet Red Army and the Yugoslav Partisans took control of Vojvodina. New Communist authorities initiated purges against one part of the local population that either collaborated with the occupying authorities or were otherwise viewed as enemies of the new regime. During this time, Partisans massacred about 40,000 Hungarian civilians. In October 1944, 3000 inhabitants of Hungarian ethnicity in Srbobran were executed by the communist partisans. In Bečej, killing of the Hungarians began on 9 October 1944. In Sombor, the murdering of the Hungarians started at once based on the death list previously made; the Hungarians were taken to the Palace of Kronich and next to the race-course, the common graves were dug in which 2500 Hungarians were buried. In total, 5650 Hungarians were executed. A Soviet officer in Temerin prevented the extermination of the whole Hungarian population of the village; Hungarian human loss of the village was 480 people. During the first week, about 1500 Hungarians were shot down into the Danube in Novi Sad. On 3 November 1944 in Bezdan, Hungarian male inhabitants of the village between 16 and 50 years were driven to a sports ground and 118 men were shot down by machine pistol to the Danube by the 12th "Udarna" Brigade of the 51st Division of Yugoslav Partisans. On 3 December 1944, 56 Hungarian citizens were executed on the bank of the Tisza river in Adorjan. In Žabalj, 2,000 Hungarians were killed. In Subotica during the 1944-45 period, about 8,000 citizens (mainly Hungarian) were killed by Yugoslav Partisans as retribution for supporting Hungarian occupation of the town. At the end of the war, detachments of Yugoslav Partisans occupied Čurug and murdered 3000 inhabitants of Hungarian ethnicity; the rest of ethnic Hungarian residents of the village were deported to detention camps and were never allowed to return.

=== Socialist Yugoslavia ===
Since the end of the World War II, the population of Hungarians in Serbia has been steadily declining, mainly due to low birth rates and emigration. In 1974, the Yugoslav constitution was modified, giving Vojvodina a very high autonomy and local Hungarians participated in provincial administration. The Hungarians were also allowed to keep their culture and language alive; they had their own schools and cultural institutions.

=== Breakup of Yugoslavia ===
As the Yugoslav Wars of the 1990s were raging, more Hungarians left Serbia. Although Serbia was spared direct armed conflict, it felt the indirect effects as large influxes of Serb refugees from Croatia and Bosnia and Herzegovina, settled in Vojvodina (primarily Syrmia and southern Bačka) significantly altering the demographic and social makeup of the province. At the same time, significant number of Hungarians emigrated to Hungary due to economic and political challenges, including disproportionate conscription into the Yugoslav People's Army during the war in Croatia, prompting many young Hungarians to emigrate in order to avoid being drafted.

== Demographics ==
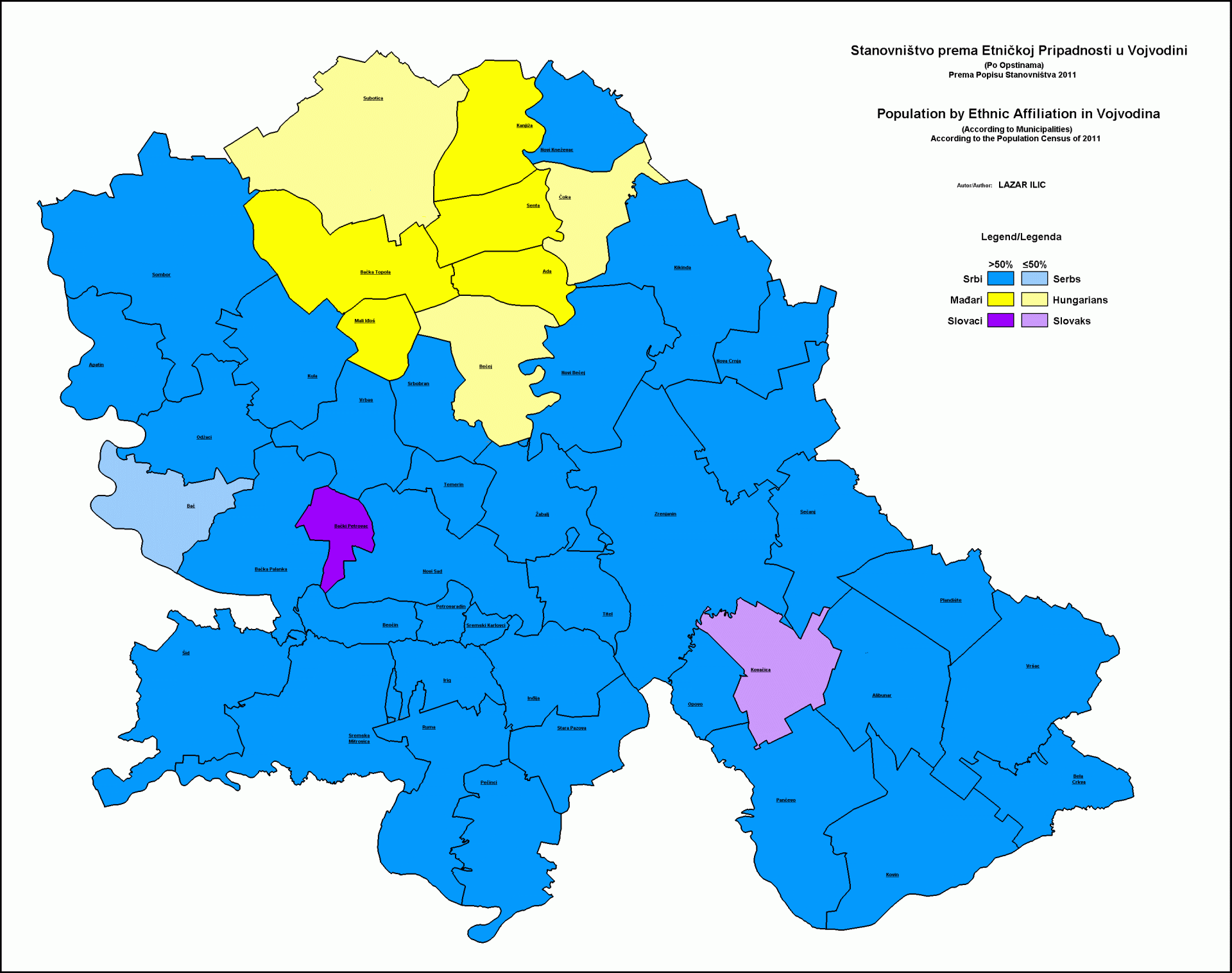
Ethnicity map of Vojvodina, Hungarians in yellow

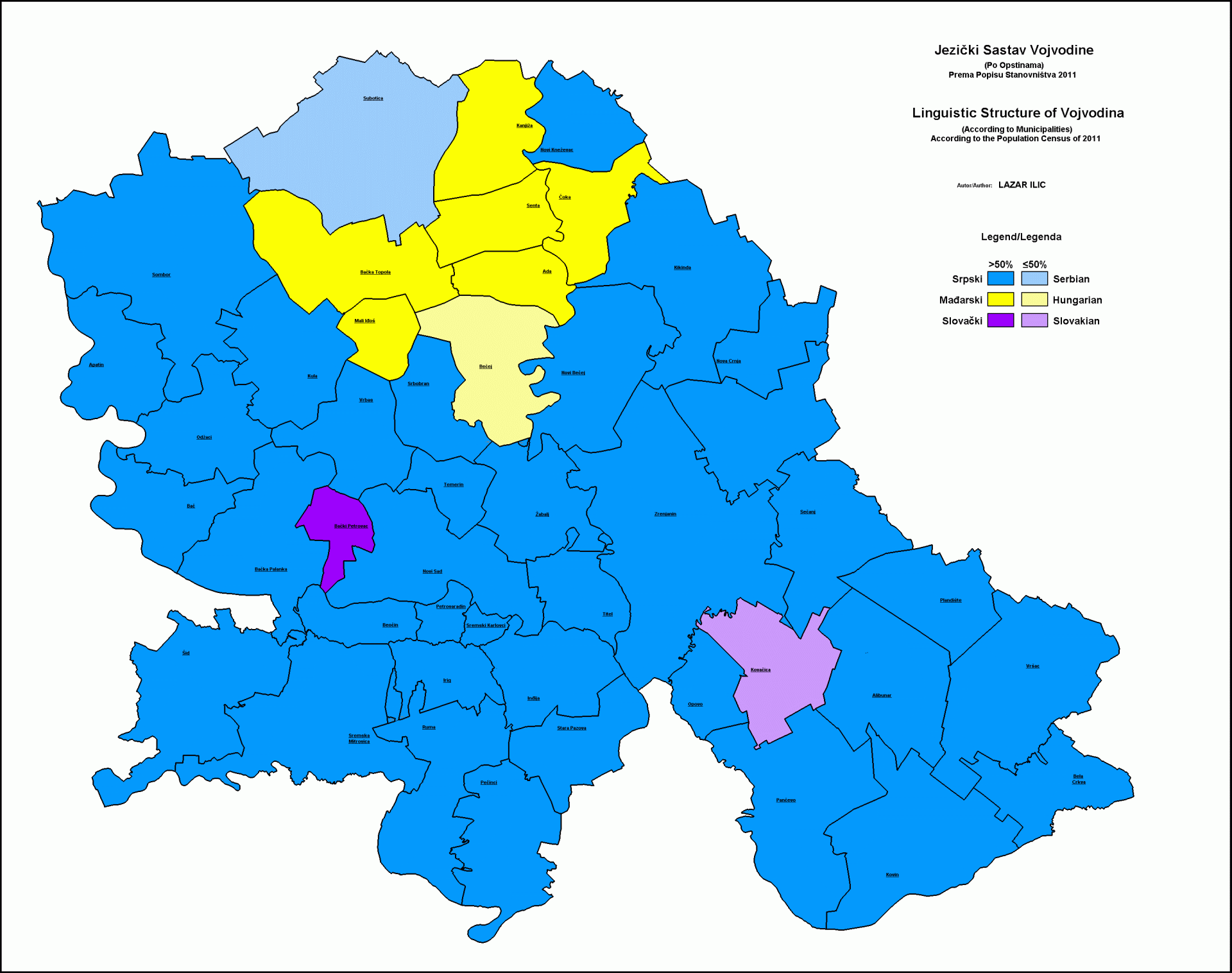
Language map of Vojvodina, Hungarian in yellow

Demographic trends of Hungarian community in Serbia are characterized by high emigration and low birth rates – the Hungarian population has fallen from 343,800 (3.5% of total population) in 1991 to 184,442 (2.8%) in 2022.

Almost all Hungarians in Serbia are to be found in Vojvodina, and especially in its northern part (North Bačka and North Banat districts, respectively) where majority (61.2%) of them live. The municipalities with Hungarian ethnic majority are: Kanjiža (83.1%), Senta (75.7%), Ada (72.7%), Bačka Topola (55.6%), and Mali Iđoš (51.8%). The municipality with Hungarian relative ethnic majority is Čoka (44.8%). The city of Subotica has the largest number of ethnic Hungarians in the country, standing at 37,200 although they make up only 30% of city's population. Protestant Hungarians form the majority of population in the villages of Stara Moravica, Pačir, Feketić, and Novi Itebej, while in Debeljača they are plurality of local population.

Year	Population	Share
1948	433,701	6.6%
1953	441,907	6.3%
1961	449,587	5.9%
1971	430,314	5.1%
1981	390,468	4.2%
1991	343,942	4.2%
2002 (excl. Kosovo)	293,299	3.9%
2011 (excl. Kosovo)	253,899	3.5%
2022 (excl. Kosovo)	184,442	2.8%

== Politics ==
The National Council of the Hungarian Ethnic Minority in Serbia is a representation body of the Hungarian ethnic minority in Serbia, established for the protection of the rights and the minority self-government of Hungarians in Serbia.

The Alliance of Vojvodina Hungarians is the major ethnic minority party representing interests of Hungarians in Serbia. It advocated the establishment of territorial autonomy for Hungarians in the northern part of Vojvodina (the municipalities with a Hungarian ethnic majority) during the 2000s, a proposal that is no longer actively pursued.

== Culture ==
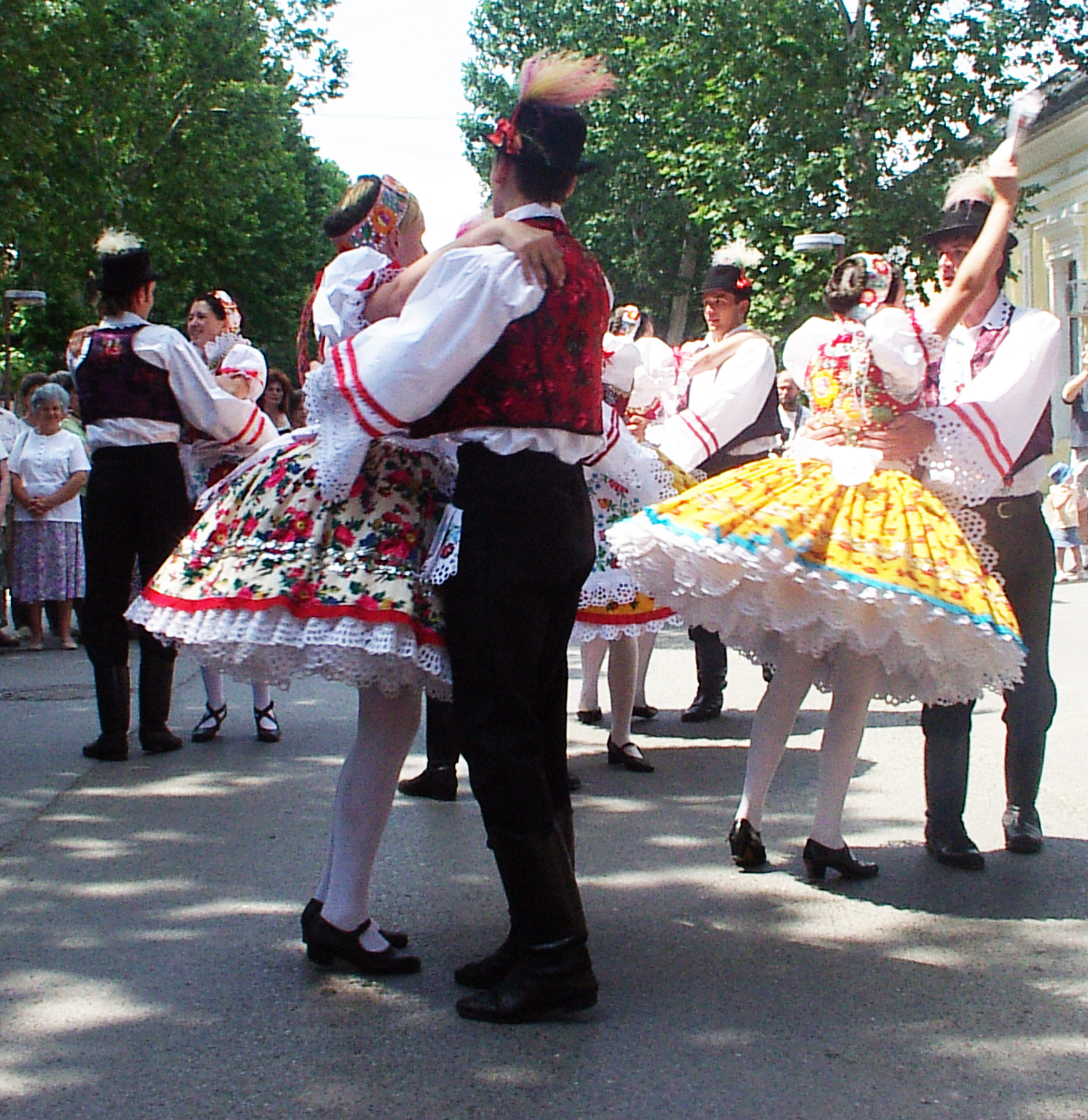
Csárdás folk dance in Doroslovo

=== Media ===
- Magyar Szó, a Hungarian-language daily newspaper published in Subotica
- Radio Television of Vojvodina, regional public broadcaster, runs a Hungarian-language Radio Novi Sad 2 radio station as well as RTV2 multilingual television channel (with significant airing time in Hungarian language).

== Notable people ==
=== Born before 1920 (in the Kingdom of Hungary) ===
- Catherine – Queen consort of Serbia
- Elizabeth – Queen consort of Serbia
- Paul Abraham – composer
- Géza Allaga – composer, cellist, and cimbalist
- József Bittenbinder – gymnast
- Ugrin Csák – nobleman
- Géza Csáth – physician, writer
- József Törley – sparkling-wine producer
- István Donogán – track and field athlete
- József Hátszeghy – fencer
- Ferenc Herczeg – playwright
- Tibor Harsányi – composer and pianist
- Alexander Kasza – pilot
- Dezső Kosztolányi – writer
- Vilmos Lázár – general
- András Littay – general
- Endre Madarász – track and field athlete
- László Moholy-Nagy – painter and photographer
- Károly Molter – novelist
- Gyula Ortutay – politician
- Gyula Pártos – architect
- Ferenc Rákosi – handball player
- Mátyás Rákosi – politician
- Jenő Rátz – general
- Michael Szilágyi – general and Regent of Hungary
- Carl von Than – chemist
- Mór Than – painter
- József Vértesy – water polo player
- Jenő Vincze – football player
- József Vértesy – football player
- Henrik Werth – general

=== Born after 1920 (in Yugoslavia and Serbia) ===
- Dalma Ružičić-Benedek – canoeist
- Aranka Binder – sport shooter
- Tamara Boros – table tennis player
- Zoltán Dani – military officer
- Laslo Djere – tennis player
- Lajos Engler – basketball player
- Silvija Erdelji – table tennis player
- Kristijan Fris – wrestler
- Vilim Harangozó – table tennis player
- Ervin Holpert – canoeist
- Jožef Holpert – handball player
- Zoltán Illés – politician
- Karolj Kasap – wrestler
- Gabor Kasa – cyclist
- József Kasza – politician
- Zsombor Kerekes – football player
- Mihalj Keri – football player
- Mihalj Kertes – politician
- Tereza Kočiš – gymnast
- László Rác Szabó – politician
- Norbert Könyves – football player
- Renata Kubik – canoeist
- Félix Lajkó – violinist and composer
- Péter Lékó – chess grand master
- Sylvester Levay – composer
- Vilmos Lóczi – basketball player and coach
- Béla Mavrák – tenor
- Đula Mešter – volleyball player
- Brižitka Molnar – volleyball player
- Antonija Nađ – sprint canoeist
- Albert Nađ – football player
- Mate Nemeš – wrestler
- Viktor Nemeš – wrestler
- László Nemet – bishop
- Erzsebet Palatinus – table tennis player
- Béla Pálfi – football player
- Antónia Panda – canoeist
- János Pénzes – bishop
- Žolt Peto – table tennis player
- Eva Ras – actress, writer, painter
- László Rátgéber –basketball coach
- Magdolna Rúzsa – singer
- Nandor Sabo – wrestler
- Szebasztián Szabó – swimmer
- Monica Seles – tennis player
- Árpád Sterbik – handball player
- Csaba Szilágyi – swimmer
- Mario Szenessy – author, translator, and literary critic
- Lajos Szűcs – football player
- Marta Tibor – canoeist
- Jožef Tertei – wrestler
- Mihály Tóth – football player
- Tibor Várady – legal scholar
- Adriana Vilagoš – athlete

== See also ==
- Hungarian diaspora
- Hungary–Serbia relations

== Sources ==
- Karolj Brindza, Učešće jugoslovenskih Mađara u narodnooslobodilačkoj borbi, Vojvodina u borbi, Matica Srpska, Novi Sad, 1951.
- Borislav Jankulov, Pregled kolonizacije Vojvodine u XVIII i XIX veku, Novi Sad - Pančevo, 2003.
- Peter Rokai - Zoltan Đere - Tibor Pal - Aleksandar Kasaš, Istorija Mađara, Beograd, 2002.
- Enike A. Šajti, Mađari u Vojvodini 1918-1947, Novi Sad, 2010.
- Aleksandar Kasaš, Mađari u Vojvodini 1941-1946, Novi Sad, 1996.
