= Antonija Panda =

Serbian sprint canoeist

Medal record

Women's canoe sprint

Representing Serbia

World Championships
Bronze medal – third place	2007 Duisburg	K-4 200 m

European Championships
Bronze medal – third place	2008 Milan	K-4 200 m

Antonija Panda (Serbian Cyrillic: Антонија Панда; born 12 March 1977 in Subotica), also known as Antonija Horvat-Panda (Serbian Cyrillic: Антонија Хорват-Панда), is a Serbian sprint canoeist who has competed since mid-2000s. She won a bronze medal in the K-4 200 m event at the 2007 ICF Canoe Sprint World Championships in Duisburg.

She competed for Serbia at the 2012 Summer Olympics with Antonija Nađ, Renata Major-Kubik and Marta Tibor, finishing 10th in the women's K-4 500 m event.
