= Bácskai Újság =

Bácskai Újság may refer to:

- Bácskai Újság (1899), a Hungarian language daily newspaper
- Bácskai Újság (1935), a Hungarian language daily political newspaper
