= Gabrielle Tuleu =

French canoeist

Personal information
- Nationality: France
- Born: 14 January 1988 (age 38) Chambray-lès-Tours, Indre-et-Loire, France
- Height: 1.65 m (5 ft 5 in)
- Weight: 65 kg (143 lb)

Sport
- Sport: Canoeing
- Event: Sprint canoe
- Club: Canoe-Kayak Club Tours
- Coached by: Jean-Pascal Crochet

Gabrielle Tuleu (born 14 January 1988 in Chambray-lès-Tours, Indre-et-Loire) is a French sprint canoeist. Tuleu is a member of Canoe-Kayak Club Tours in Tours, and is coached and trained by Jean-Pascal Crochet.

Tuleu represented France at the 2012 Summer Olympics in London, where she competed in the women's K-4 500 metres, along with her teammates Marie Delattre, Sarah Guyot, and Joanne Mayer. Tuleu and her team finished last in the final by more than a second behind the Russian team (led by Yuliana Salakhova), recording the slowest time of 1:35.299.
