= Joanne Mayer =

French canoeist

Personal information
- Nationality: France
- Born: 16 March 1993 (age 33) Mulhouse, France
- Height: 1.67 m (5 ft 5 1/2 in)
- Weight: 57 kg (126 lb)

Sport
- Sport: Canoeing
- Event: Sprint canoe
- Club: Mulhouse-AS Cheminots; Riedisheim
- Coached by: Sébastien Mayer

Joanne Mayer (born 16 March 1993 in Mulhouse) is a French sprint canoeist. Mayer is a member of the canoe and kayak team for Mulhouse-AS Cheminots Riedisheim, and is coached and trained by her father Sébastien Mayer, who competed in the men's kayak four (1000 m) at the 1992 Summer Olympics in Barcelona. Her grandfather Albert Mayer, on the other hand, also participated in the same discipline at the 1968 Summer Olympics in Mexico City.

Mayer represented France at the 2012 Summer Olympics in London, where she competed in the women's K-4 500 metres, along with her teammates Marie Delattre, Sarah Guyot, and Gabrielle Tuleu. Mayer and her team finished last in the final by more than a second behind the Russian team (led by Yuliana Salakhova), recording the slowest time of 1:35.299.
