= Bácskai Friss Újság =

Bácskai Friss Újság (lit. Bachkan Fresh News) was a Hungarian language daily newspaper. It was founded in 1901, with the purpose of serving as the information source for the Magyars and Hungarian language-speaking population in Bács-Bodrog County within the Kingdom of Hungary in Austria-Hungary. It was published in Subotica (Today in Serbia). Its editors were Imre Dugovich and János Kovács. Bácskai Friss Újság was disestablished that same year.

== See also ==
- Bácskai Újság (1899)
- Bácskai Újság (1935)
- Hungarians in Vojvodina
