= Yulia Kachalova =

Russian canoeist

Personal information
- Full name: Yuliya Nikolayevna Kachalova
- Nationality: Russia
- Born: 13 December 1989 (age 36) Moscow, Russian SFSR
- Height: 1.77 m (5 ft 9 1/2 in)
- Weight: 68 kg (150 lb)

Sport
- Sport: Canoeing
- Event: Sprint canoe

Yuliya Nikolayevna Kachalova (Russian: Юлия Николаевна Качалова; born December 13, 1989, in Moscow) is a Russian sprint canoeist. Kachalova represented Russia at the 2012 Summer Olympics in London, where she competed in the women's K-4 500 metres, along her teammates Yuliana Salakhova, Vera Sobetova, and Natalia Podolskaya. Kachalova and her team finished seventh in the final by six thousandths of a second (0.006) behind the Portuguese team (led by Teresa Portela), with a time of 1:33.459.
