= Sarah Guyot =

French canoeist (born 1991)

Personal information
- Nationality: France
- Born: 16 April 1991 (age 35) Vannes, Morbihan, France
- Height: 1.76 m (5 ft 9 1/2 in)
- Weight: 68 kg (150 lb)

Sport
- Sport: Canoeing
- Event: Sprint canoe
- Club: Canoe Kayak Club Tours
- Coached by: Nicolas Maillot
Medal record
Representing France
U23 World Championships
Gold medal – first place	2013 Niagara	K-1 500 m
Mediterranean Games
Silver medal – second place	2018 Taragona	K-1 200 m

Sarah Guyot (French: [saʁa ɡɥijo]; born 16 April 1991 in Vannes, Morbihan) is a French sprint canoeist. Guyot is a member of Canoe Kayak Club Tours in Tours, and is coached and trained by Nicolas Maillot. She began to canoe when she was 10, following an elder brother who also canoed at that time.

Guyot represented France at the 2012 Summer Olympics in London, where she competed in the women's K-4 500 metres, along with her teammates Marie Delattre, Joanne Mayer, and Gabrielle Tuleu. Guyot and her team finished last in the final by more than a second behind the Russian team (led by Yuliana Salakhova), recording the slowest time of 1:35.299.

At the 2013 U23 World Championships, she won a gold medal in the K-1 500 m.

In 2014, the European U23 Championships were held in Mantes-en-Yvelines, France; Guyot won two gold medals on home water, the K-1 200 m and the K-1 500 m.

At the 2016 Olympics, Guyot competed in the K-1 200 m, reaching the final, where she finished in 5th place.

In 2017, she graduated from her training in physiotherapy, allowing her to concentrate on canoeing.
