= Natalia Podolskaya (canoeist) =

Russian canoeist (born 1993)

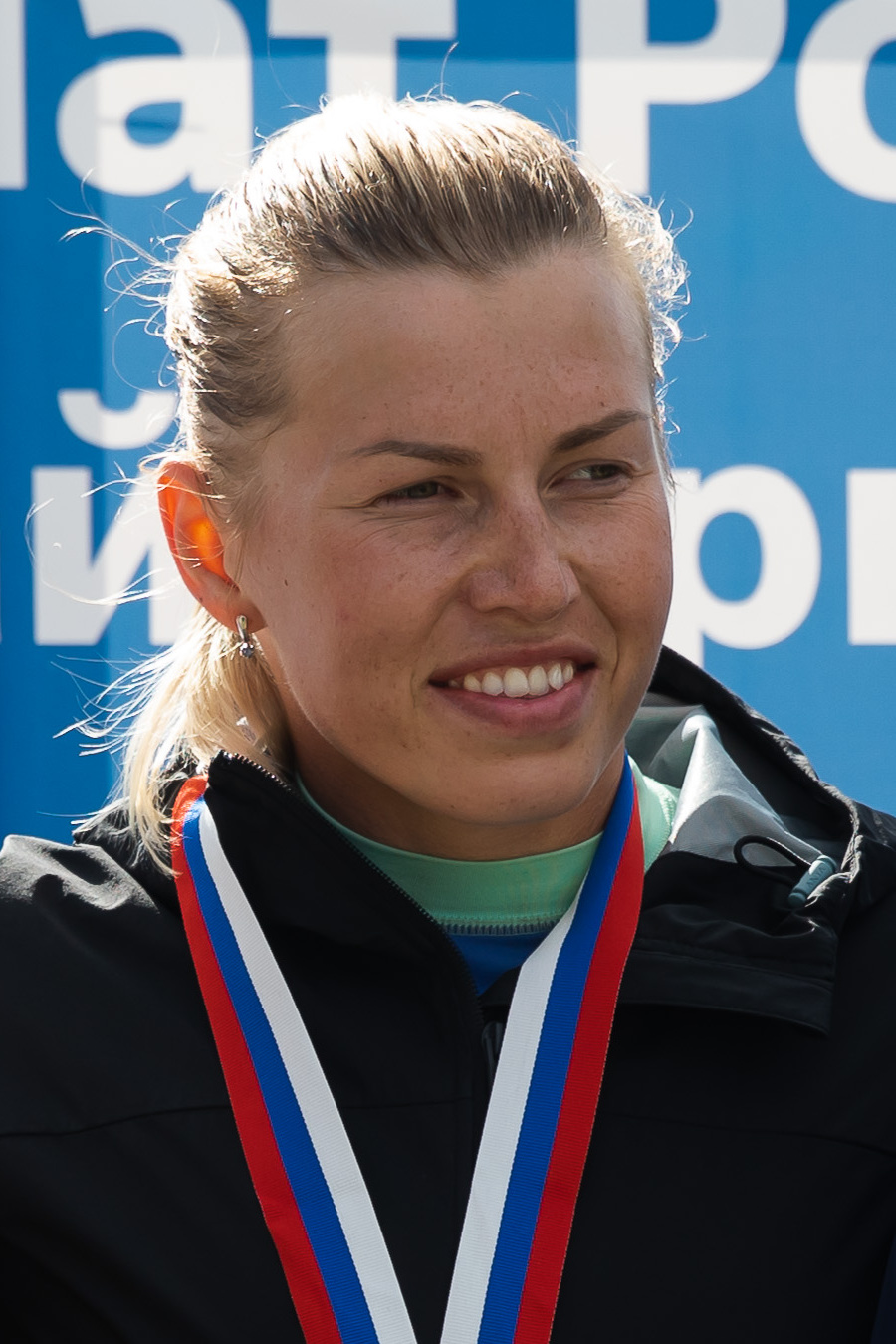

Personal information
- Full name: Nataliya Yuryevna Podolskaya
- Nationality: Russian
- Born: 14 October 1993 (age 32) Vologda, Russia
- Height: 1.70 m (5 ft 7 in)
- Weight: 64 kg (141 lb)

Sport
- Country: Russia
- Sport: Sprint kayak
- Club: Pomorie Regional Centre of Sports Preparation
Medal record
Women's sprint kayak
Representing Russia
World Championships
Silver medal – second place	2014 Moscow	K-1 4 x 200 m
Bronze medal – third place	2013 Duisburg	K-1 4 x 200 m
Bronze medal – third place	2021 Copenhagen	K-1 200 m
European Games
Silver medal – second place	2015 Baku	K-1 200 m
European Championships
Silver medal – second place	2015 Račice	K-1 200 m
Silver medal – second place	2018 Belgrade	K-2 200 m
U23 World Championships
Gold medal – first place	2013 Niagara	K-2 500 m

Nataliya Yuryevna Podolskaya (Russian: Наталья Юрьевна Подольская; born 14 October 1993) is a Russian sprint canoeist.

Podolskaya represented Russia at the 2012 Summer Olympics in London, where she competed only in the women's K-4 500 metres, along her teammates Yuliana Salakhova, Vera Sobetova, and Yulia Kachalova. Podolskaya and her team finished seventh in the final by six thousandths of a second (0.006) behind the Portuguese team (led by Teresa Portela), with a time of 1:33.459. In June 2015, she competed in the inaugural European Games, for Russia in canoe sprint, more specifically, Women's K-1 200m. She earned a silver medal. She qualified for the women's K-1 200 metres and women's K-1 500 metres events at the 2020 Summer Olympics.
