= Jessica Walker =

British sprint canoeist (born 1990)

Personal information
- Full name: Jessica Samantha Walker
- Nationality: British
- Born: 24 June 1990 (age 36) Brighton, England
Medal record
Women's canoe sprint
Representing Great Britain
European Championships
Silver medal – second place	2016 Moscow	K-1 200m
Bronze medal – third place	2014 Brandenburg	K-2 200m

Jessica Samantha Walker (born 24 June 1990 in Brighton) is a British sprint canoeist who has competed since the late 2000s until present. She came 7th in the London 2012 K-1 200m final and 5th in the K-4 500m final. She also competed at the 2008 (K-2: 500m with Anna Hemmings) and 2016 (K-1: 200m and K-4: 500m) Olympics.

She finished 7th in the K-1 200m at the 2011 World Championships.
