= Albert Mayer (canoeist) =

French canoeist (born 1943)

Albert Mayer (born 6 April 1943) is a French sprint canoer who competed in the late 1960s. He was eliminated in the semifinals of the K-4 1000 m event at the 1968 Summer Olympics in Mexico City. His son Sébastien Mayer and granddaughter Joanne Mayer are also canoeists.
