= Sajan (Kikinda) =

Sajan Сајан (Serbian) Szaján (Hungarian)
- Village (Selo)
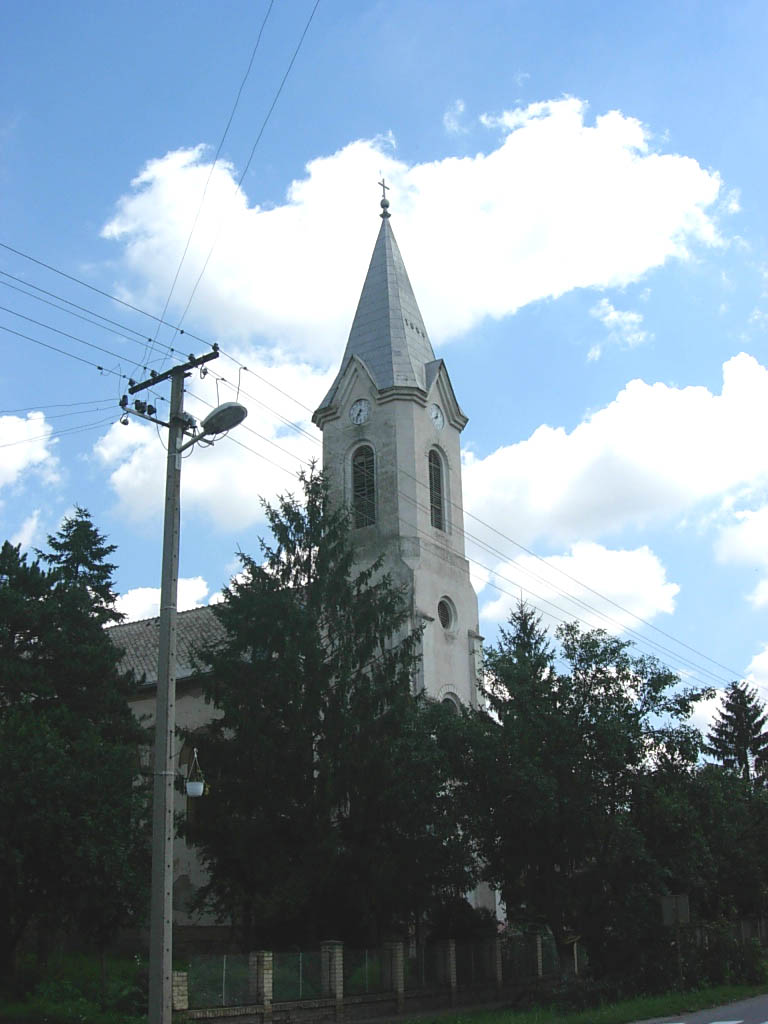
- Saint Stephen the King Catholic Churchn

- Location within Vojvodina Location within Serbia Location within Europe
- Coordinates: 45°50′24″N 20°16′25″E
- Country: Serbia
- Province: Vojvodina
- Region: Banat
- District: North Banat
- Municipality: Kikinda
- Elevation: 83 m (272 ft)

Population (2011)
  - Sajan: 1,164
- Time zone: UTC+1 (CET)
  - Summer (DST): UTC+2 (CEST)
- Postal code: 23324
- Area code: +381(0)230
- Car plates: KI

Sajan (Serbian Cyrillic: Сајан, Hungarian: Szaján) is a village in the Kikinda municipality, in the North Banat District of Serbia. It is situated in the Autonomous Province of Vojvodina. The village has a Hungarian ethnic majority (88.64%) and a population of 1,164 (2011 census).

== Name ==
The village was first mentioned in 1225 under the name of Zeyhan. Zeyhan was the name of a Cuman ruler in the neighbouring county of Bodrogiensis (The nomadic Cumans were settled in the central part of the Pannonian Plain in the medieval Kingdom of Hungary in the 13th century, and they often controlled also the neighbouring settlements, which were not inhabited by Cumans).

The Cumans are often spoken of as Turan people, who migrated from Central Asia and settled in this area. Their primary settlement had been around the Sayan Mountains. There are theories that claim this would explain the origin of the name of today's Sajan.

Another theory claim that name Sajan is of Slavic origin, since the Slavic village with similar name Zajan was recorded in Vesprimiensis county in 1398. It is assumed that name came from the Slavic name Svojan (Jovan M. Pejin, Iz prošlosti Kikinde, Kikinda, 2000).

== History ==
The village belonged to the Csanád County in 1449 and in this time was populated by Slavs.

At the beginning of the 19th century, the village of Sajan was in the possession of a landowner named Tajnay János and spread over 9,500 acres (38 km^{2}) of land. The first settlers were ethnic Hungarians who came from the area around Szeged in 1805. In order to boost the economic development of the village, Tajnay János invited to the north-east side of the village ethnic Germans, and thus appeared the settlement of Wilhelmfeld, also known as Wilhelminenfeld, which Hungarians called Mihler.

The first school was built in 1828 and its first teacher was Balog András. During the 1848 revolution, Sajan was completely burned down and by the end of the century totally abandoned due to a cholera epidemic. After spending a few years in neighbouring Iđoš, the inhabitants returned. A Roman Catholic church was built in 1880.

== Historical population ==
- 1837: 3,362
- 1853: 2,457
- 1900: 2,432
- 1948: 2,430
- 1953: 2,432
- 1961: 2,334
- 1971: 1,982
- 1981: 1,665
- 1991: 1,555
- 2002: 1,348

== See also ==
- List of places in Serbia
- List of cities, towns and villages in Vojvodina
