= Sébastien Mayer =

French canoeist

Sébastien Mayer (born 28 March 1970 in Mulhouse) is a French sprint canoeist who competed in the early 1990s. He was eliminated in the semifinals of the K-4 1000 m event at the 1992 Summer Olympics in Barcelona. He is son of canoeist Albert Mayer and father of male kayakist Joanne Mayer.
