= Iryna Pamialova =

Belarusian canoeist (born 1990)

Personal information
- Full name: Iryna Uladzimirauna Pamialova
- Born: 5 April 1990 (age 36) Zhodzina, Belarus
Medal record
Women's canoe sprint
Representing Belarus
Olympic Games
Bronze medal – third place	2012 London	K-4 500 m
World Championships
Bronze medal – third place	2011 Szeged	K-4 500 m
European Championships
Gold medal – first place	2011 Belgrade	K-4 500 m
Silver medal – second place	2012 Zagreb	K-4 500 m

Iryna Uladzimirauna Pamialova (Belarusian: Ірына Уладзіміраўна Памялова; born 5 April 1990 in Zhodzina) is a Belarusian canoer. She won a bronze medal at the 2012 Summer Olympics in the K-4 500 metres event with Nadzeya Papok-Liapeshka, Volha Khudzenka, and Maryna Litvinchuk.
