= Bácskai Újság (1899) =

Bácskai Újság (lit. Bachkan News) was a Hungarian language daily newspaper. It was founded in 1899, with the purpose of serving as the information source for the Magyars and Hungarian language-speaking population in Bács-Bodrog County within the Kingdom of Hungary in Austria-Hungary. It was published in Subotica (Today in Serbia). Bácskai Újság was disestablished in 1900.

== See also ==
- Bácskai Friss Újság
- Bácskai Újság (1935)
- Hungarians in Vojvodina
