= Bácskai Újság (1935) =

Bácskai Újság (lit. Bacskan News) was a Hungarian language daily political newspaper. It was founded in 1935, with the purpose of serving as the information source for the population of Hungarian part of Bácska. It was published in Baja in Hungary. Its chief-in-editor was Károly Ruszthi. Bácskai Újság was disestablished in 1942.

== See also ==
- Bácskai Újság (1899)
- Bácskai Friss Újság
- Hungarians in Vojvodina
