= Rachel Lovell =

Australian kayak racer (born 1978)

Personal information
- Nickname: Rach
- Nationality: Australian
- Born: 20 March 1978 (age 47); Evesham, United Kingdom
- Height: 169 cm (67 in) (2012)
- Weight: 61 kg (134 lb) (2012)

Sport
- Country: Australia
- Sport: Canoeing
- Event: K-4 500 m

Rachel Lovell (born 20 March 1978) is an Australian kayak racer. She was selected to represent Australia at the 2012 Summer Olympics in the K-4 500 m event.

== Personal ==
Nicknamed Rach, Lovell was born on 20 March 1978 in Evesham, United Kingdom and spent her childhood in south west London. She is a former Brit. She attended primary school at Fladbury School in Worcestershire, United Kingdom before going to high school at Pershore High School in Worcestershire, United Kingdom. She then went to the University of Kingston from 1996 to 1999 where she earned a Bachelor of Science in Radiography. Lovell is married to canoe coach Geoff Lovell, and has two children. She has step-brothers (Stephen and Andrew) who were world champions in canoe. She moved to Queensland in 2008, and became an Australian citizen in 2009. As of 2012, she lives in Sunshine Coast, Queensland suburb of Buderim.

Lovell is 169 centimetres (67 in) tall and weighs 61 kilograms (134 lb).

== Canoeing ==
Lovell took up the sport when she was seven years old because she wanted to be like her step brothers. She is a member of the Sunshine Coast Canoe Club. She has a canoeing scholarship with the Queensland Academy of Sport and the Australian Institute of Sport. She has been coached by Geoff Lovell, her husband, for 15 years. Since moving to Australia and returning to the sport in 2010, her training is based in Sunshine Coast, Queensland.

In 2003, Lovell won a bronze medal K1 200m at the European Championships. She tried to earn selection to the Great Britain team for the 2004 Summer Olympics but missed selection. She was a member of the Great Britain national canoe team in 2005 and 2006. She quit canoeing in 2008 after she failed to qualify for the 2008 Summer Olympics as a member of Great Britain Olympic team because of a pregnancy, only taking up the sport again in 2011.

Lovell finished 3rd in the K4 500m and 5th in the K2 200m event at the 2011 World Cup 1 in Poznań, Poland. She finished 5th in the K1 200m event at the 2011 World Cup 2 in Račice, Czech Republic. She finished 5th in the K4 500m event at the 2011 Canoe Sprint World Championships in Szeged, Hungary. She finished 1st in the K4 500m and 3rd in the K2 500m event at the 2012 Oceania Championships in Penrith, Australia. She finished 1st in the K4 500m event at the 2012 National Championships in Penrith, Australia.

Lovell was selected to represent Australia at 2012 Summer Olympics in the K-4 500 m event. She made her Olympic debut as a thirty-four-year-old. Before the start of the Games, she and her canoe teammates trained in Italy at the AIS European Training Centre located in Varese.
