= Doroslovo =

Doroslovo Дорослово (Serbian) Doroszló (Hungarian)
- Village (Selo)
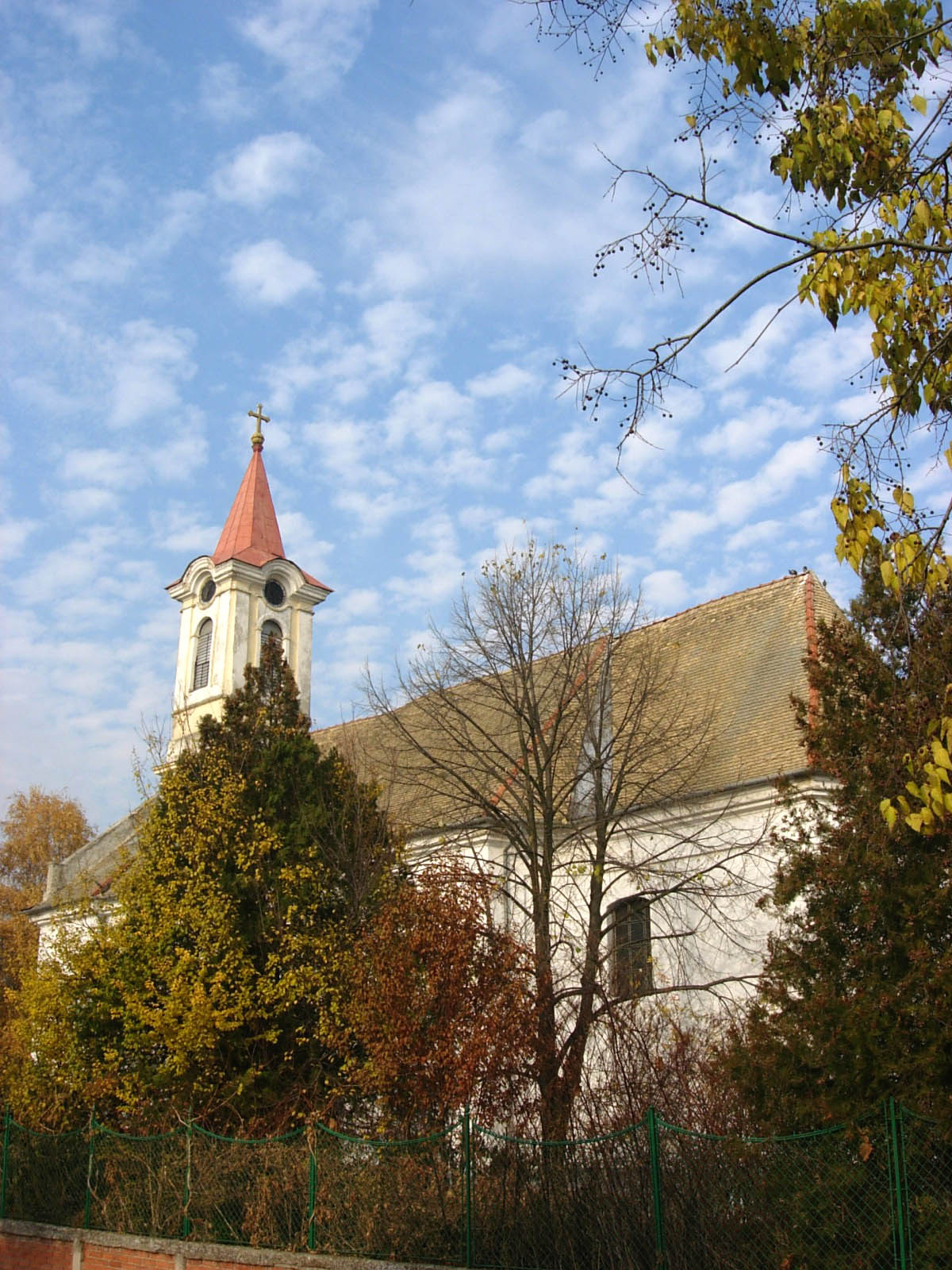
- The Saint Emerick Catholic Church

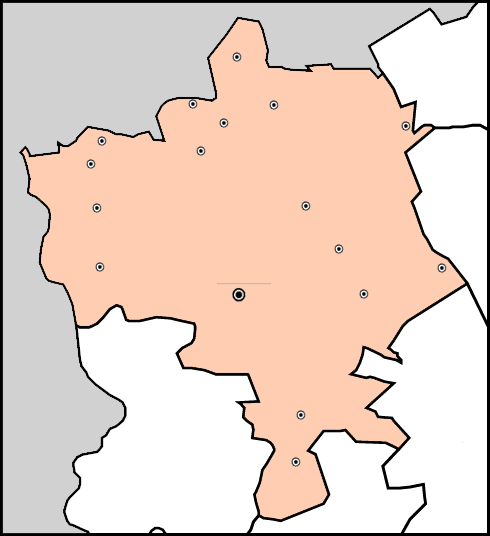

- Location within Vojvodina Location within Serbia Location within Europe
- Coordinates: 45°37′N 19°11′E
- Country: Serbia
- Province: Vojvodina
- Region: Bačka
- District: West Bačka
- Municipality: Sombor

Population (2002)
  - Total: 1,830
- Time zone: UTC+1 (CET)
  - Summer (DST): UTC+2 (CEST)

Doroslovo (Serbian: Дорослово or Doroslovo, Hungarian: Doroszló, Croatian: Doroslovo) is a village in Serbia. It is located in the municipality of Sombor, West Bačka District, Vojvodina province. The population of the village numbering 1,830 people (2002 census) and most of its inhabitants are ethnic Hungarians. Villagers are mostly preoccupied with farming. It is widely known as a Christian pilgrimage site.

== Location ==
Doroslovo is located between Sombor and Novi Sad, 15 km from Sombor, 60 km from Novi Sad and 45 km from Osijek in Croatia, across the Danube bridge.

== Ethnic groups (2002 census) ==
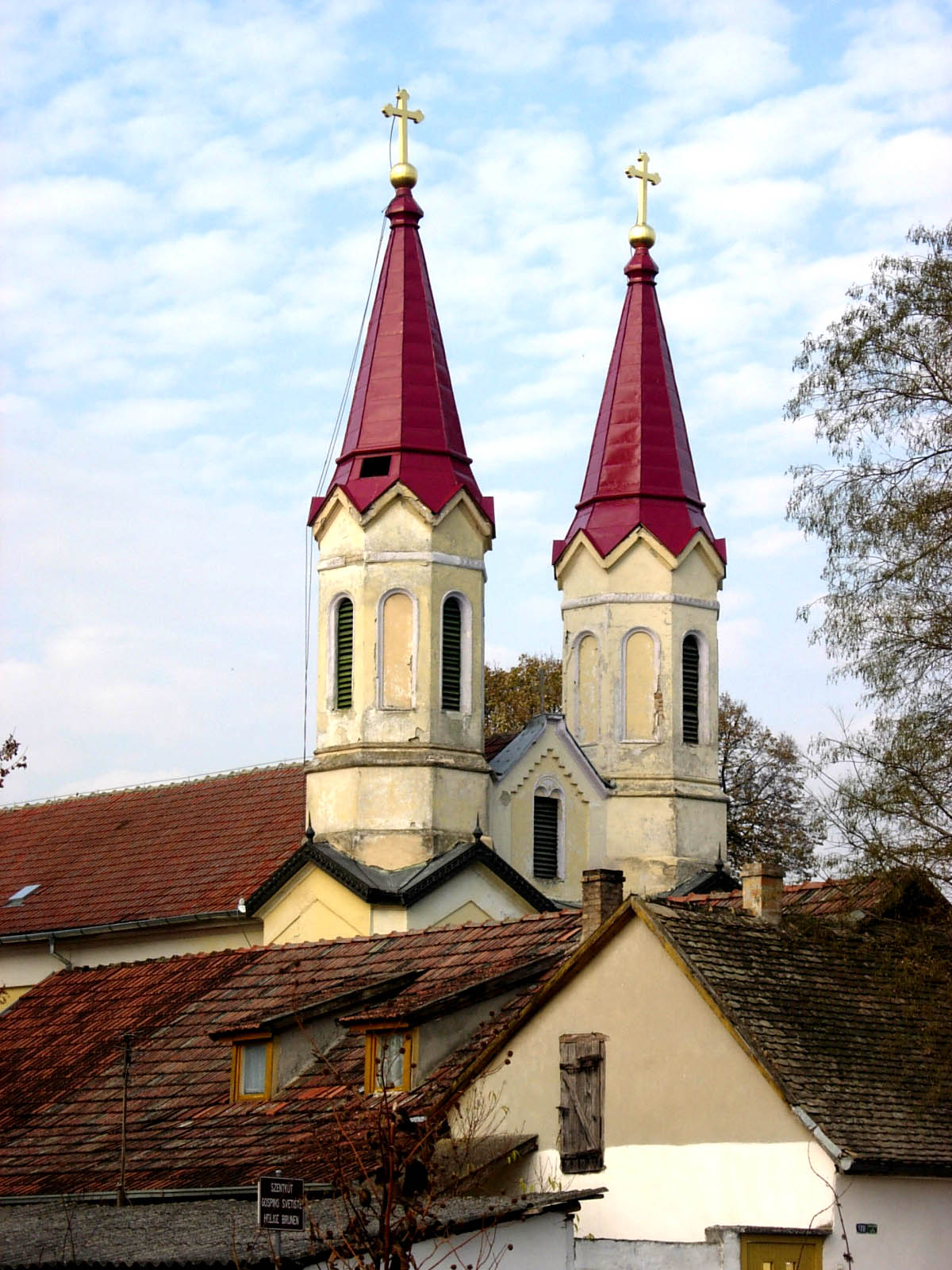
Church of Mother of God Helper of Christians near Doroslovo.

Ethnic groups in the village include:

- 952 (52.02%) Hungarians
- 659 (36.01%) Serbs
- 84 (4.59%) Croats
- 39 (2.13%) Yugoslavs
- 39 (2.13%) Romani
- Others.

== History ==
The miracle fountain shrine of Bajkut (Бајкут, Bajkút), now called Sentkut (Сенткут, Szentkút - holy well) is located close to the village of Doroslovo. It has been known since the Middle Ages when the area belonged to the Kingdom of Hungary.

Doroslovo probably was the location of a monastery founded in the 12th century and a church built in memory of the martyr St. Lõrinc, which is now ruined and forgotten. The first documents of Bajkut (Bajkút) as a parish are from 1382 and the existence of a fountain with miraculous powers was mentioned already then. The settlement became the property of the nuns and remained so for a very long time until the Ottoman conquest in the 16th century.

During the Ottoman rule (16th-17th century), Doroslovo is mentioned as a place populated by ethnic Serbs. Since the end of the 17th century it was part of the Habsburg monarchy and since 1918 part of the Kingdom of Serbs, Croats and Slovenes and subsequent [Yugoslavian] states.

== Historical population ==
- 1961: 2,669
- 1971: 2,339
- 1981: 2,131
- 1991: 1,864
- 2002: 1,830

== Holy water ==
According to the legend,Mary, mother of Jesus has appeared at the fountain Sentkut (Szentkút) on several occasions and it is believed that she asked God to give healing power to the water of the well. Many miraculous events have been linked with Sentkut (Szentkút).

In 1792, a 40-year-old blind man, Janos Zabloczky was told by The Holy Mother in a dream, to go to Doroslovo and wash his eyes in the Sentkut (Szentkút) water and he gained his sight back. The priests of Doroslovo have since then noted many healings at the shrine. Many believers, including the blind and crippled are visiting the shrine, hoping for blessing, recovery and peace of mind and the number of pilgrims have greatly increased.

== Church ==
The first chapel in honour of The Holy Mother was built in 1796. A new one replaced it in 1809 but was destroyed by fire after 50 years. A third chapel was made of bricks in 1825 and rebuilt and enlarged into the present church with the addition of two towers in 1875. A sculpture of Virgin Mary was erected close by the well in 1861 and a Lourdes cave shrine with a statue of St. Mary was consecrated in 1910.

A building with a long outside corridor, to be used for confessions was built in 1909 and the whole area was turned into a nice park with trees and bushes. The outside of the church was renovated in 1942 but the coloured glass windows were demolished during World War II. The inside of the church was renovated in 1967. An open-air altar attached to the outside of the church was consecrated in 1974 and fresco paintings by Lajos Horvath were made behind the open-air altar, on the walls of the confessional corridor and on the outside of the nearby caretaker's house. In 2009 the open-air altar was reconstructed and enlarged, the Holy Mary sculpture was moved closer to the church and the area between the sculpture and the church reconstructed and provided with new benches. The following years the church underwent a much needed renovation and extension with a new chapel on the northern side of the church. In 2012 the caretaker's house and the adjacent house for visiting priests were demolished. Unfortunately, all the fresco paintings of the open-air altar and the demolished house were removed in the process. A new house has been built to replace the demolished buildings.

== See also ==
- List of places in Serbia
- List of cities, towns and villages in Vojvodina
