= Antonija Nađ =

Serbian canoeist

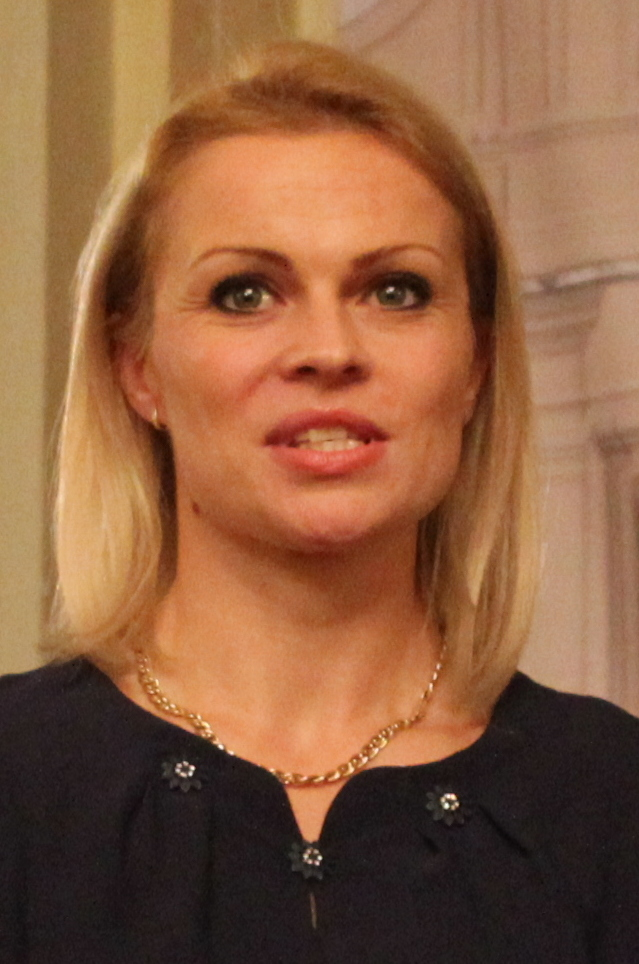
- Nađ in 2019

Medal record

Women's canoe sprint

Representing Serbia

European Championships
Silver medal – second place	2008 Milan	K-1 1000 m
Silver medal – second place	2011 Belgrade	K-1 1000 m

Mediterranean Games
Silver medal – second place	2009 Pescara	K-1 1000 m
Bronze medal – third place	2013 Mersin	K-1 500 m

European U23 Championships
Gold medal – first place	2006 Athens	K-1 1000 m
Gold medal – first place	2007 Belgrade	K-1 1000 m
Silver medal – second place	2008 Szeged	K-1 1000 m

Antonija Nađ (Serbian Cyrillic: Антонија Нађ, born 8 May 1986 in Bezdan, SR Serbia, Yugoslavia) is a Serbian canoe sprinter.

She won silver medals in the K-1 1000 m event at the 2008 Canoe Sprint European Championships in Milan and 2011 Canoe Sprint European Championships in Belgrade.

Before she started to train canoeing she practised karate. She is a member of the KKK Vojvodina, a kayak and canoe club in Novi Sad.
