= Yuliana Salakhova =

Russian canoeist (born 1984)

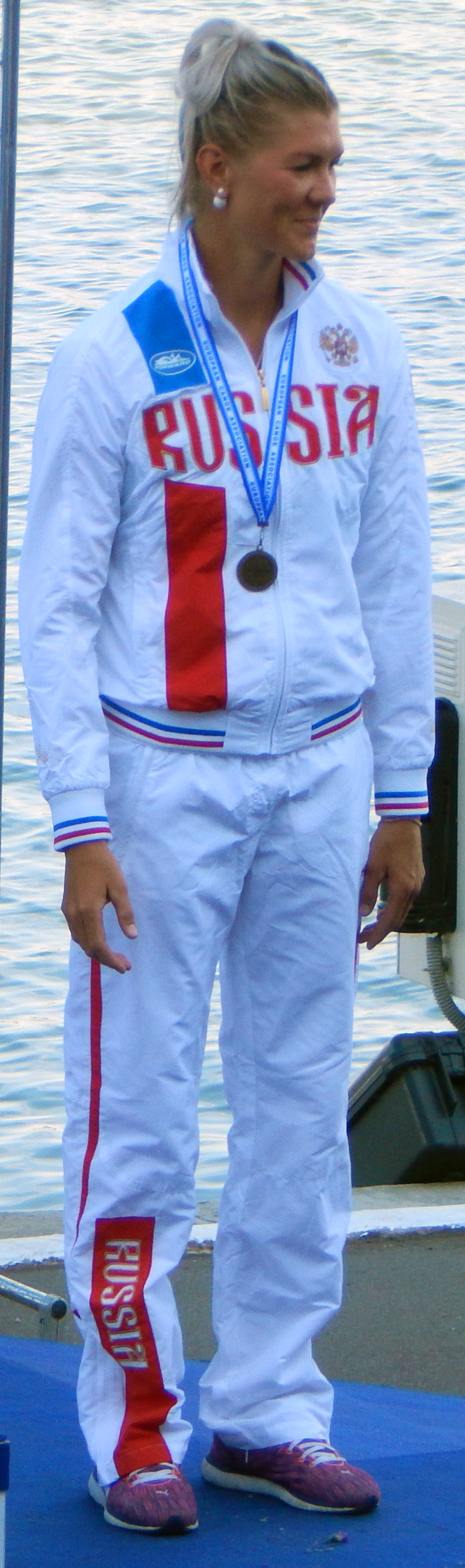
- Salalakhova in 2016

Personal information
- Born: 16 December 1984 (age 41) Volgograd, Russia
- Height: 179 cm (5 ft 10 in)
- Weight: 71 kg (157 lb)

Sport
- Sport: Canoe sprint
- Club: Yunost Moscow
- Coached by: Yu. S. Surkov, N. K. Sabirzyanov
Medal record
Representing Russia
World Championships
Silver medal – second place	2010 Poznań	K-2 500 m
Bronze medal – third place	2010 Poznań	K-2 1000 m
European Championships
Bronze medal – third place	2011 Belgrade	K-2 500 m
Bronze medal – third place	2011 Belgrade	K-2 1000 m
Bronze medal – third place	2016 Moscow	K-1 5000 m

Yuliana Bulatovna Salakhova (Russian: Юлиана Булатовна Салахова; born 16 December 1984) is a Russian former sprint canoeist. She won two medals at the 2010 ICF Canoe Sprint World Championships in Poznań with a silver in the K-2 500 m and a bronze in the K-2 1000 m events.

At the 2008 Summer Olympics in Beijing, Salakhova finished ninth in the K-1 500 m event. In the same event at the 2012 Summer Olympics, she finished nineteenth. She was also part of the Russian K-4 500 m team that finished in seventh.
