= Rowing at the 2008 Summer Olympics – Men's coxless four =

Men's coxless four at the Games of the XXIX Olympiad

Medalists
1st place, gold medalist(s)		Tom James; Steve Williams; Pete Reed; Andrew Triggs Hodge	Great Britain
2nd place, silver medalist(s)		Matt Ryan; James Marburg; Cameron McKenzie-McHarg; Francis Hegerty	Australia
3rd place, bronze medalist(s)		Julien Desprès; Benjamin Rondeau; Germain Chardin; Dorian Mortelette	France

Men's coxless four competition at the 2008 Summer Olympics in Beijing was held between August 9 and 16, at the Shunyi Olympic Rowing-Canoeing Park.

This rowing event is a sweep rowing event, meaning that each rower has one oar and rows on only one side. Four rowers crew each boat, and no coxswain is used. The competition consists of multiple rounds. Finals were held to determine the placing of each boat; these finals were given letters with those nearer to the beginning of the alphabet meaning a better ranking. Semifinals were named based on which finals they fed, with each semifinal having two possible finals.

During the first round three heats were held. The top three boats in each heat advanced to the A/B semifinals, with the remaining boats going to the repechage. A single repechage heat was held, with the top three boats from that heat also advancing to the A/B semifinal. The lone remaining boat, placing fourth in the repechage, received a final rank of 13th of the 13 boats competing.

Only A/B semifinals were held. For each of the two semifinal races, the top three boats moved on to the better of the two finals (the A final), while the bottom three boats went to the lesser of the two finals (the B final).

The third and final round was the Finals. Each final determined a set of rankings. The A final determined the medals, along with the rest of the places through 6th. The B final gave rankings from 7th to 12th.

== Schedule ==
All times are China Standard Time (UTC+8)

Date	Time	Round
Saturday, August 9, 2008	17:30-18:00	Heats
Monday, August 11, 2008	17:30-17:40	Repechage
Wednesday, August 13, 2008	16:50-17:10	Semifinals A/B
Friday, August 15, 2008	17:50-18:00	Final B
Saturday, August 16, 2008	17:30-17:40	Final A

== Results ==
=== Heats ===
Qualification Rules: 1-3->SA/B, 4..->R

==== Heat 1 ====
Rank	Rowers	Country	Time	Notes
1	James, Williams, Reed, Triggs Hodge	Great Britain	6:00.59	SA/B
2	C. Mornati, Sartori, N. Mornati, Carboncini	Italy	6:02.84	SA/B
3	Banks, Teti, Lanzone, Newlin	United States	6:03.96	SA/B
4	Zhang, Zhao, Guo, Song	China	6:09.64	R
5	Dzemyanenka, Lialin, Nosau, Kazubouski	Belarus	6:12.63	R

==== Heat 2 ====
Rank	Rowers	Country	Time	Notes
1	Cirkel, Vellenga, Gabriels, Vermeulen	Netherlands	6:00.50	SA/B
2	Meyer, Dallinger, Murray, Bond	New Zealand	6:00.73	SA/B
3	T. Pirih, Rozman, Kolander, M. Pirih	Slovenia	6:03.78	SA/B
4	Gruber, Horvath, Bruncvik, Neffe	Czech Republic	6:10.36	R

==== Heat 3 ====
Rank	Rowers	Country	Time	Notes
1	Ryan, Marburg, McKenzie, Hegerty	Australia	6:00.40	SA/B
2	Hauffe, Seifert, Kaeufer, Adamski	Germany	6:00.95	SA/B
3	Folan, Casey, Devlin, O'Neill	Ireland	6:02.85	SA/B
4	Desprès, Rondeau, Chardin, Mortelette	France	6:05.00	R

=== Repechage ===
Qualification Rules: 1-3->SA/B

Rank	Rowers	Country	Time	Notes
1	Gruber, Horvath, Bruncvik, Neffe	Czech Republic	5:58.69	SA/B
2	Desprès, Rondeau, Chardin, Mortelette	France	6:00.01	SA/B
3	Dzemyanenka, Lialin, Nosau, Kazubouski	Belarus	6:00.44	SA/B
4	Zhang, Zhao, Guo, Song	China	6:02.37	

=== Semifinals A/B ===
Qualification Rules: 1-3->FA, 4..->FB

==== Semifinal A/B 1 ====
Rank	Athlete	Country	Time	Notes
1	James, Williams, Reed, Triggs Hodge	Great Britain	5:54.77	FA
2	Ryan, Marburg, McKenzie, Hegerty	Australia	5:56.20	FA
3	Desprès, Rondeau, Chardin, Mortelette	France	5:56.73	FA
4	Meyer, Dallinger, Murray, Bond	New Zealand	5:57.31	FB
5	Banks, Teti, Lanzone, Newlin	United States	5:57.52	FB
6	Folan, Casey, Devlin, O'Neill	Ireland	5:58.14	FB

==== Semifinal A/B 2 ====
Rank	Athlete	Country	Time	Notes
1	T. Pirih, Rozman, Kolander, M. Pirih	Slovenia	5:56.08	FA
2	Gruber, Horvath, Bruncvik, Neffe	Czech Republic	5:58.02	FA
3	Hauffe, Seifert, Kaeufer, Adamski	Germany	5:58.72	FA
4	Cirkel, Vellenga, Gabriels, Vermeulen	Netherlands	6:02.46	FB
5	Dzemyanenka, Lialin, Nosau, Kazubouski	Belarus	6:02.79	FB
6	C. Mornati, Sartori, N. Mornati, Carboncini	Italy	6:05.21	FB

=== Final B ===
Rank	Athlete	Country	Time	Notes
1	Meyer, Dallinger, Murray, Bond	New Zealand	6:06.30	
2	Cirkel, Vellenga, Gabriels, Vermeulen	Netherlands	6:06.37	
3	Banks, Teti, Lanzone, Newlin	United States	6:07.17	
4	Folan, Casey, Devlin, O'Neill	Ireland	6:07.97	
5	C. Mornati, Sartori, N. Mornati, Carboncini	Italy	6:08.77	
6	Dzemyanenka, Lialin, Nosau, Kazubouski	Belarus	6:12.54	

=== Final A ===
Rank	Athlete	Country	Time	Notes
Gold medal	James, Williams, Reed, Triggs Hodge	Great Britain	6:06.57	
Silver medal	Ryan, Marburg, McKenzie, Hegerty	Australia	6:07.85	
Bronze medal	Desprès, Rondeau, Chardin, Mortelette	France	6:09.31	
4	T. Pirih, Rozman, Kolander, M. Pirih	Slovenia	6:11.62	
5	Gruber, Horvath, Bruncvik, Neffe	Czech Republic	6:16.56	
6	Urban, Schmidt, Kaeufer, Hauffe	Germany	6:19.63	

Australia took out an early lead and had were leading by about one boat length at the 500 m to go mark. At that point the favored British crew began to take back ground and took the lead with about 200 m to go, eventually winning by half a length. France came back from last at one point to grab the bronze.
