= Czech Republic at the 2008 Summer Olympics =

- IOC code: CZE
- NOC: Czech Olympic Committee
- Website: www.olympic.cz (in Czech and English)

in Beijing
- Competitors: 134 in 19 sports
- Flag bearers: Štěpánka Hilgertová (opening); Věra Cechlová (closing)
- Medals Ranked 24th: Gold 3 Silver 3 Bronze 1 Total 7

Summer Olympics appearances (overview)
- 1996; 2000; 2004; 2008; 2012; 2016; 2020; 2024; 2028

Other related appearances
- Bohemia (1900–1912); Czechoslovakia (1924–1992)

The Czech Republic participated in the 2008 Summer Olympics in Beijing, China. The Czech delegation consisted of around 130 athletes.

== Medalists ==
Medal	Name	Sport	Event	Date
Gold	Kateřina Emmons	Shooting	Women's 10 m air rifle	9 August
Gold	David Kostelecký	Shooting	Men's trap	10 August
Gold	Barbora Špotáková	Athletics	Women's javelin throw	21 August
Silver	Kateřina Emmons	Shooting	Women's 50 m rifle 3 positions	14 August
Silver	Ondřej Štěpánek; Jaroslav Volf	Canoeing	Men's slalom C-2	15 August
Silver	Ondřej Synek	Rowing	Men's single sculls	16 August
Bronze	Marek Švec	Wrestling	Men's Greco-Roman 96 kg	14 August

Medals by sport
Sport	1st place, gold medalist(s)	2nd place, silver medalist(s)	3rd place, bronze medalist(s)	Total
Athletics	1	0	0	1
Canoeing	0	1	0	1
Shooting	2	1	0	3
Rowing	0	1	0	1
Wrestling	0	0	1	1
Total	3	3	1	7

Medals by day
Day	Date	1st place, gold medalist(s)	2nd place, silver medalist(s)	3rd place, bronze medalist(s)	Total
1	August 9	1	0	0	1
2	August 10	1	0	0	1
6	August 14	0	1	1	2
7	August 15	0	1	0	1
8	August 16	0	1	0	1
13	August 21	1	0	0	1
Total		3	3	1	7

Medals by gender
Gender	1st place, gold medalist(s)	2nd place, silver medalist(s)	3rd place, bronze medalist(s)	Total	Percentage
Male	1	2	1	4	57.14%
Female	2	1	0	3	42.86%
Mixed	0	0	0	0	0.00%
Total	3	3	1	7	100%

Multiple medalists
Name	Sport	1st place, gold medalist(s)	2nd place, silver medalist(s)	3rd place, bronze medalist(s)	Total
Kateřina Emmons	Shooting	1	1	0	2

== Archery ==
Athlete	Event	Ranking round		Round of 64	Round of 32	Round of 16	Quarterfinals	Semifinals	Final / BM	
Athlete	Event	Score	Seed	Opposition Score	Opposition Score	Opposition Score	Opposition Score	Opposition Score	Opposition Score	Rank
Martin Bulíř	Men's individual	629	56	di Buò (ITA) (9); L 100–111	Did not advance					
Barbora Horáčková	Women's individual	620	44	Koval (UKR) (9); L 107–109	Did not advance					

== Athletics ==
Key

- Note–Ranks given for track events are within the athlete's heat only
- Q = Qualified for the next round
- q = Qualified for the next round as a fastest loser or, in field events, by position without achieving the qualifying target
- NR = National record
- N/A = Round not applicable for the event
- Bye = Athlete not required to compete in round

Men
Track & road events

Athlete	Event	Heat		Quarterfinal		Semifinal		Final	
Athlete	Event	Result	Rank	Result	Rank	Result	Rank	Result	Rank
Lukáš Milo	100 m	10.52	5	Did not advance					
Jiří Vojtík	200 m	21.05	4	Did not advance					
Rudolf Götz	400 m	46.38	6	—N/a		Did not advance			
Jakub Holuša	800 m	1:48.19	3	—N/a		Did not advance			
Stanislav Sajdok	110 m hurdles	13.89	6	Did not advance					
Petr Svoboda	110 m hurdles	13.43	3 Q	13.41	2 Q	13.60	7	Did not advance	
Roman Bílek	50 km walk	—N/a						4:18:32	45

Field events

Athlete	Event	Qualification		Final	
Athlete	Event	Distance	Position	Distance	Position
Roman Novotný	Long jump	7.94	12 q	8.00	8
Jaroslav Bába	High jump	2.29	=1 Q	2.29	6
Tomáš Janků	High jump	2.29	=1 Q	2.29	7
Štěpán Janáček	Pole vault	5.30	=17	Did not advance	
Jan Kudlička	Pole vault	5.65	=7 q	5.45	10
Petr Stehlík	Shot put	19.41	28	Did not advance	
Jan Marcell	Discus throw	59.52	28	Did not advance	
Vítězslav Veselý	Javelin throw	81.20	5 q	76.76	12
Lukáš Melich	Hammer throw	70.56	29	Did not advance	

Combined events – Decathlon

Athlete	Event	100 m	LJ	SP	HJ	400 m	110H	DT	PV	JT	1500 m	Final	Rank
Roman Šebrle	Result	11.21	7.68	14.78	2.11	49.54	14.71	45.50	4.80	63.93	4:49.63	8241	5
Roman Šebrle	Points	814	980	776	906	836	885	777	849	797	621	8241	5

Women
Track & road events

Athlete	Event	Heat		Semifinal		Final	
Athlete	Event	Result	Rank	Result	Rank	Result	Rank
Lucie Škrobáková	100 m hurdles	13.18	6	Did not advance			
Zuzana Hejnová	400 m hurdles	55.91	3 Q	55.17	4 Q	54.97	7
Zuzana Schindlerová	20 km walk	—N/a				1:32.57	27

Field events

Athlete	Event	Qualification		Final	
Athlete	Event	Distance	Position	Distance	Position
Denisa Ščerbová	Long jump	6.46	20	Did not advance	
Martina Šestáková	Triple jump	NM	—	Did not advance	
Romana Dubnová	High jump	1.93	=14 q	1.89	15
Iva Straková	High jump	1.93	7 q	1.93	12
Kateřina Baďurová	Pole vault	NM	—	Did not advance	
Věra Cechlová	Discus throw	61.61	9 Q	61.75	5
Jarmila Klimešová	Javelin throw	57.25	21	Did not advance	
Barbora Špotáková	Javelin throw	67.69	1 Q	71.42	1st place, gold medalist(s)
Lenka Ledvinová	Hammer throw	67.17	26	Did not advance	

Combined events – Heptathlon

Athlete	Event	100H	HJ	SP	200 m	LJ	JT	800 m	Final	Rank
Denisa Ščerbová	Result	13.88	1.65	DNS	—	—	—	—	DNF	
Denisa Ščerbová	Points	995	795	0	—	—	—	—	DNF	

== Badminton ==
Athlete	Event	Round of 64	Round of 32	Round of 16	Quarterfinal	Semifinal	Final / BM	
Athlete	Event	Opposition Score	Opposition Score	Opposition Score	Opposition Score	Opposition Score	Opposition Score	Rank
Petr Koukal	Men's singles	Smith (GBR); L 21–10, 12–21, 15–21	Did not advance					
Kristína Ludíková	Women's singles	Daniel (NGR); W 21–13, 21–8	Hallam (GBR); L 18–21, 13–21	Did not advance				

== Basketball ==
=== Women's tournament ===
Roster

The following is the Czech Republic roster in the women's basketball tournament of the 2008 Summer Olympics.

Czech Republic women's national basketball team – 2008 Summer Olympics roster
Players
Coaches

Pos.	No.	Name	Age – Date of birth	Height	Club	Ctr.
F	4	Jana Veselá	24 – December 31, 1983	6 ft 4 in (1.93 m)	Gambrinus Sika Brno	(Czech Republic)
F/C	5	Ivana Večeřová	29 – March 30, 1979	6 ft 4 in (1.93 m)	Gambrinus Sika Brno	(Czech Republic)
F	6	Romana Hejdová	20 – May 9, 1988	6 ft 0 in (1.83 m)	Valosun Brno	(Czech Republic)
F	7	Michala Hartigová	24 – November 14, 1983	6 ft 4 in (1.93 m)	ZVVZ USK Praha	(Czech Republic)
PG	8	Michaela Uhrová	26 – April 10, 1982	5 ft 4 in (1.63 m)	UMB Banka Bystrica	(Czech Republic)
SG	9	Hana Machová	28 – September 11, 1979	6 ft 0 in (1.83 m)	Gambrinus Sika Brno	(Czech Republic)
C	10	Edita Šujanová	23 – May 23, 1985	6 ft 3 in (1.91 m)	Bonas UFK Nitra	(Czech Republic)
F/C	11	Miloslava Svobodová	22 – September 16, 1985	6 ft 3 in (1.91 m)	Gambrinus Sika Brno	(Czech Republic)
F	12	Markéta Mokrošová (C)	27 – April 17, 1981	5 ft 10 in (1.78 m)	ZVVZ USK Praha	(Czech Republic)
C	13	Petra Kulichová	23 – September 13, 1984	6 ft 6 in (1.98 m)	Gambrinus Sika Brno	(Czech Republic)
SG	14	Kateřina Elhotová	18 – October 14, 1989	5 ft 11 in (1.8 m)	ZVVZ USK Praha	(Czech Republic)
F	15	Eva Vítečková	26 – January 26, 1982	6 ft 3 in (1.91 m)	Gambrinus Sika Brno	(Czech Republic)

Head coach

- (Czech Republic) Jan Bobrovsky

Legend

- (C) Team captain
- Club – describes last
  club before the tournament
- Age – describes age
  on August 9, 2008

Group play

Pos	Team	Pld	W	L	PF	PA	PD	Pts	Qualification
1	United States	5	5	0	491	276	+215	10	Quarterfinals
2	China (H)	5	4	1	358	346	+12	9	Quarterfinals
3	Spain	5	3	2	357	324	+33	8	Quarterfinals
4	Czech Republic	5	2	3	346	356	−10	7	Quarterfinals
5	New Zealand	5	1	4	320	423	−103	6	
6	Mali	5	0	5	255	402	−147	5	

Source: FIBA archive
Rules for classification: 1) points; 2) head-to-head points; 3) head-to-head points difference; 4) head-to-head number of points scored.
(H) Hosts

9 August 2008
20:00

Report

Czech Republic	57–97	United States
Scoring by quarter: 17–22, 14–27, 13–26, 13–22
Pts: Veselá 8 Rebs: Veselá 9 Asts: Machová 4		Pts: Pondexter 12; Rebs: Fowles 14; Asts: Lawson 3

Wukesong Indoor Stadium, Beijing
Attendance: 11,083
Referees: Michael Aylen (AUS)

11 August 2008
11:15

Report

Czech Republic	81–47	Mali
Scoring by quarter: 23–4, 15–18, 18–11, 25–14
Pts: Machová 14; Rebs: Kulichova, Vecerova 7 Asts: Mokrosova 3		Pts: Sissoko 24; Rebs: Sissoko 13; Asts: Bagayoko 3

Wukesong Indoor Stadium, Beijing
Attendance: 11,083
Referees: Scott Butler (AUS)

13 August 2008
11:15

Report

Spain	74–55	Czech Republic
Scoring by quarter: 15–21, 13–6, 30–11, 16–17
Pts: Montañana 20; Rebs: Pascua 8 Asts: Palau 5		Pts: Viteckova 12; Rebs: Machová 8 Asts: Machová 5

Wukesong Indoor Stadium, Beijing
Attendance: 11,083
Referees: Carl Jungebrand (FIN)

15 August 2008
09:00

Report

Czech Republic	90–59	New Zealand
Scoring by quarter: 26–12, 18–19, 21–7, 25–21
Pts: Machová 23; Rebs: Vesela 10; Asts: Vesela 5		Pts: Marino 22; Rebs: Wallbutton 10; Asts: Bates 5

Wukesong Indoor Stadium, Beijing
Attendance: 11,083
Referees: Chantal Julien (FRA)

17 August 2008
20:00

Report

China	79–63	Czech Republic
Scoring by quarter: 24–11, 17–14, 24–20, 14–18
Pts: Miao 21; Rebs: Bian 9 Asts: Chen 3		Pts: Hartigova 15; Rebs: Veselá, Vecerova 8 Asts: Veselá, Machová 3

Wukesong Indoor Stadium, Beijing
Attendance: 11,083
Referees: Stephen Seibel (CAN)

Quarterfinals

19 August 2008
16:45

Report

Australia	79–46	Czech Republic
Scoring by quarter: 23–10, 15–7, 23–10, 17–19
Pts: Jackson 17; Rebs: Jackson 12; Asts: Harrower 4		Pts: Vecerova, Machova 8 Rebs: Kulichova 5 Asts: Machova 4

Wukesong Indoor Stadium, Beijing
Attendance: 11,083
Referees: Romualdas Brazauskas (LTU)

== Canoeing ==
=== Slalom ===
Athlete	Event	Preliminary						Semifinal		Final			
Athlete	Event	Run 1	Rank	Run 2	Rank	Total	Rank	Time	Rank	Time	Rank	Total	Rank
Vavřinec Hradilek	Men's K-1	85.61	8	86.41	10	172.02	7 Q	88.97	11	Did not advance			
Stanislav Ježek	Men's C-1	85.69	2	86.40	7	172.09	4 Q	89.85	2 Q	92.44	6	182.29	5
Ondřej Štěpánek; Jaroslav Volf	Men's C-2	93.78	2	97.16	4	190.94	4 Q	95.33	3 Q	97.56	3	192.89	2nd place, silver medalist(s)
Štěpánka Hilgertová	Women's K-1	97.14	6	91.99	2	189.13	3 Q	101.78	3 Q	242.63	9	344.41	9

=== Sprint ===
Athlete	Event	Heats		Semifinals		Final	
Athlete	Event	Time	Rank	Time	Rank	Time	Rank
Jana Blahová; Michaela Mrůzková	Women's K-2 500 m	1:45.104	3 F	Bye		1:44.870	8

Qualification Legend: SF = Qualify to semi-final; F = Qualify directly to final

== Cycling ==
=== Road ===
Athlete	Event	Time	Rank
Petr Benčík	Men's road race	6:39:42	75
Roman Kreuziger	Men's road race	6:26:35	45

=== Track ===
Sprint

Athlete	Event	Qualification		Round 1	Round 2	Quarterfinals	Semifinals	Final	
Athlete	Event	Time Speed (km/h)	Rank	Opposition Time Speed (km/h)	Opposition Time Speed (km/h)	Opposition Time Speed (km/h)	Opposition Time Speed (km/h)	Opposition Time Speed (km/h)	Rank
Adam Ptáčník	Men's sprint	10.569; 68.123	19	Did not advance					
Tomáš Bábek; Adam Ptáčník; Denis Špička	Men's team sprint	45.678; 59.109	11	Did not advance					

Pursuit

Athlete	Event	Qualification		Semifinals		Finals	
Athlete	Event	Time	Rank	Opponent Results	Rank	Opponent Results	Rank
Lada Kozlíková	Women's individual pursuit	3:39.561	8 Q	Houvenaghel (GBR); DNF	8	Did not advance	

Keirin

Athlete	Event	1st round	Repechage	2nd round	Finals
Athlete	Event	Rank	Rank	Rank	Rank
Denis Špička	Men's keirin	4 R	2	Did not advance	

Omnium

Athlete	Event	Points	Laps	Rank
Milan Kadlec	Men's points race	20	1	9
Lada Kozlíková	Women's points race	2	0	13
Milan Kadlec; Alois Kaňkovský	Men's madison	3	−3	13

=== Mountain biking ===
Athlete	Event	Time	Rank
Jaroslav Kulhavý	Men's cross-country	2:03:20	18
Tereza Huříková	Women's cross-country	Did not finish	

=== BMX ===
Athlete	Event	Seeding		Quarterfinals		Semifinals		Final	
Athlete	Event	Result	Rank	Points	Rank	Points	Rank	Result	Rank
Michal Prokop	Men's BMX	36.689	20	18	6	Did not advance			
Jana Horáková	Women's BMX	38.077	8	—N/a		16	5	Did not advance	

== Equestrian ==
=== Eventing ===
Athlete	Horse	Event	Dressage		Cross-country			Jumping						Total	
Athlete	Horse	Event	Dressage		Cross-country			Qualifier			Final			Total	
Athlete	Horse	Event	Penalties	Rank	Penalties	Total	Rank	Penalties	Total	Rank	Penalties	Total	Rank	Penalties	Rank
Jaroslav Hatla	Karla	Individual	52.80	42	Eliminated			Did not advance							

== Gymnastics ==
=== Artistic ===
Men

Athlete	Event	Qualification								Final							
Athlete	Event	Apparatus						Total	Rank	Apparatus						Total	Rank
Athlete	Event	F	PH	R	V	PB	HB	Total	Rank	F	PH	R	V	PB	HB	Total	Rank
Martin Konečný	Pommel horse	—N/a	13.650	—N/a				13.650	58	Did not advance							
Martin Konečný	Horizontal bar	—N/a					13.125	13.125	73	Did not advance							

Women

Athlete	Event	Qualification						Final					
Athlete	Event	Apparatus				Total	Rank	Apparatus				Total	Rank
Athlete	Event	F	V	UB	BB	Total	Rank	F	V	UB	BB	Total	Rank
Kristýna Pálešová	All-around	13.300	14.325	15.100	15.075	57.800	26 Q	12.900	14.075	15.350	14.650	56.975	21

=== Trampoline ===
Athlete	Event	Qualification		Final	
Athlete	Event	Score	Rank	Score	Rank
Lenka Popkin	Women's	57.60	15	Did not advance	

== Judo ==
Athlete	Event	Preliminary	Round of 32	Round of 16	Quarterfinals	Semifinals	Repechage 1	Repechage 2	Repechage 3	Final / BM	
Athlete	Event	Opposition Result	Opposition Result	Opposition Result	Opposition Result	Opposition Result	Opposition Result	Opposition Result	Opposition Result	Opposition Result	Rank
Pavel Petříkov	Men's −60 kg	Bye	Lourenço (BRA); W 0011–0000	Sobirov (UZB); L 0000–0001	Did not advance						
Jaromír Ježek	Men's −73 kg	—N/a	Muminov (UZB); L 0001–1000	Did not advance							

== Modern pentathlon ==
Athlete	Event	Shooting (10 m air pistol)			Fencing (épée one touch)			Swimming (200 m freestyle)			Riding (show jumping)			Running (3000 m)			Total points	Final rank
Athlete	Event	Points	Rank	MP Points	Results	Rank	MP points	Time	Rank	MP points	Penalties	Rank	MP points	Time	Rank	MP Points	Total points	Final rank
Michal Michalík	Men's	188	3	1192	16–19	=21	784	2:08.37	24	1260	28	1	1172	9:47.25	25	1052	5460	6
David Svoboda	Men's	191	1	1228	24–11	3	976	2:05.40	17	1296	1016*	32	184	9:24.35	7	1144	4828	29
Lucie Grolichová	Women's	177	21	1060	23–12	3	952	2:19.78	19	1244	140	26	1060	11:06.47	28	1056	5372	16

* Did not finish

== Rowing ==
Men

Athlete	Event	Heats		Repechage		Quarterfinals		Semifinals		Final	
Athlete	Event	Time	Rank	Time	Rank	Time	Rank	Time	Rank	Time	Rank
Ondřej Synek	Single sculls	7:23.94	1 QF	—N/a		6:50.23	1 SA/B	7:03.57	1 FA	7:00.63	2nd place, silver medalist(s)
Václav Chalupa; Jakub Makovička	Pair	6:52.50	3 SA/B	Bye		—N/a		6:37.88	4 FB	6:52.57	8
Milan Doleček; Jakub Hanák; David Jirka; Petr Vitásek	Quadruple sculls	6:00.98	5 R	6:04.95	3 SA/B	—N/a		5:56.38	4 FB	5:50.07	10
Milan Bruncvík; Jan Gruber; Michal Horváth; Karel Neffe	Four	6:10.36	4 R	5:58.69	1 SA/B	—N/a		5:58.02	2 FA	6:16.56	5

Women

Athlete	Event	Heats		Repechage		Quarterfinals		Semifinals		Final	
Athlete	Event	Time	Rank	Time	Rank	Time	Rank	Time	Rank	Time	Rank
Miroslava Knapková	Single sculls	7:51.56	1 QF	—N/a		7:30.33	1 SA/B	7:38.14	3 FA	7:35.52	5
Jitka Antošová*; Gabriela Vařeková	Double sculls	7:04.23	2 R	7:00.75	2 FA	—N/a				7:25.09	6

Qualification Legend: FA=Final A (medal); FB=Final B (non-medal); FC=Final C (non-medal); FD=Final D (non-medal); FE=Final E (non-medal); FF=Final F (non-medal); SA/B=Semifinals A/B; SC/D=Semifinals C/D; SE/F=Semifinals E/F; QF=Quarterfinals; R=Repechage

* Jitka Antošová fell ill during the course of the competition and was replaced by Miroslava Knapková at the final.

== Sailing ==
Men

Athlete	Event	Race											Net points	Final rank
Athlete	Event	1	2	3	4	5	6	7	8	9	10	M*	Net points	Final rank
Martin Trčka	Laser	29	36	38	13	29	19	26	~~DNF~~	12	CAN	EL	202	31

Women

Athlete	Event	Race											Net points	Final rank
Athlete	Event	1	2	3	4	5	6	7	8	9	10	M*	Net points	Final rank
Lenka Mrzílková; Lenka Šmídová	470	6	4	~~12~~	11	11	5	11	11	9	1	14	83	7

Open

Athlete	Event	Race											Net points	Final rank
Athlete	Event	1	2	3	4	5	6	7	8	9	10	M*	Net points	Final rank
Michael Maier	Finn	15	14	22	~~25~~	21	23	19	23	CAN	CAN	EL	137	25

M = Medal race; EL = Eliminated – did not advance into the medal race; CAN = Race cancelled

== Shooting ==
Men

Athlete	Event	Qualification		Final	
Athlete	Event	Points	Rank	Points	Rank
Václav Haman	10 m air rifle	593	13	Did not advance	
Václav Haman	50 m rifle 3 positions	1163	23	Did not advance	
Tomáš Jeřábek	50 m rifle prone	586	46	Did not advance	
David Kostelecký	Trap	121	2 Q	146 OR	1st place, gold medalist(s)
Martin Podhráský	25 m rapid fire pistol	565	14	Did not advance	
Martin Strnad	25 m rapid fire pistol	562	16	Did not advance	
Jan Sychra	Skeet	117	16	Did not advance	
Martin Tenk	50 m pistol	544	37	Did not advance	
Miroslav Varga	50 m rifle prone	590	29	Did not advance	

Women

Athlete	Event	Qualification		Final	
Athlete	Event	Points	Rank	Points	Rank
Kateřina Emmons	10 m air rifle	400 OR	1 Q	503.5 OR	1st place, gold medalist(s)
Kateřina Emmons	50 m rifle 3 positions	586	6 Q	687.7	2nd place, silver medalist(s)
Pavla Kalná	10 m air rifle	392	31	Did not advance	
Lenka Marušková	10 m air pistol	379	26	Did not advance	
Lenka Marušková	25 m pistol	578	20	Did not advance	
Michaela Musilová	10 m air pistol	375	35	Did not advance	
Michaela Musilová	25 m pistol	571	34	Did not advance	
Adéla Sýkorová	50 m rifle 3 positions	578	19	Did not advance	

== Swimming ==
Men

Athlete	Event	Heat		Semifinal		Final	
Athlete	Event	Time	Rank	Time	Rank	Time	Rank
Tomáš Fučík	100 m backstroke	57.29	41	Did not advance			
Tomáš Fučík	200 m individual medley	2:02.85	31	Did not advance			
Jiří Jedlička	100 m breaststroke	1:01.56	29	Did not advance			
Jiří Jedlička	200 m breaststroke	2:15.79	39	Did not advance			
Michal Rubáček	100 m butterfly	53.53	42	Did not advance			
Květoslav Svoboda	200 m freestyle	1:51.67	46	Did not advance			
Květoslav Svoboda	400 m freestyle	3:56.54	33	—N/a		Did not advance	
Květoslav Svoboda	200 m backstroke	2:03.12	40	Did not advance			
Martin Verner	100 m freestyle	48.95	21	Did not advance			
Rostislav Vítek	10 km open water	—N/a				1:52:41.8	17

Women

Athlete	Event	Heat		Semifinal		Final	
Athlete	Event	Time	Rank	Time	Rank	Time	Rank
Sandra Kazíková	50 m freestyle	25.54	29	Did not advance			
Petra Klosová	100 m backstroke	1:03.36	39	Did not advance			
Jana Klusáčková	100 m freestyle	55.92	31	Did not advance			
Jana Pechanová	10 km open water	—N/a				1:59:39.7	8

== Synchronized swimming ==
Athlete	Event	Technical routine		Free routine (preliminary)			Free routine (final)		
Athlete	Event	Points	Rank	Points	Total (technical + free)	Rank	Points	Total (technical + free)	Rank
Soňa Bernardová; Alžběta Dufková	Duet	42.500	18	42.750	85.250	18	Did not advance		

== Table tennis ==
Athlete	Event	Preliminary round	Round 1	Round 2	Round 3	Round 4	Quarterfinals	Semifinals	Final / BM	
Athlete	Event	Opposition Result	Opposition Result	Opposition Result	Opposition Result	Opposition Result	Opposition Result	Opposition Result	Opposition Result	Rank
Petr Korbel	Men's singles	Bye		Błaszczyk (POL); L 2–4	Did not advance					
Dana Hadačová	Women's singles	Shaban (JOR); W 4–0	Pavlovich (BLR); W 4–2	Póta (HUN); L 3–4	Did not advance					

== Tennis ==
Men

Athlete	Event	Round of 64	Round of 32	Round of 16	Quarterfinals	Semifinals	Final / BM	
Athlete	Event	Opposition Score	Opposition Score	Opposition Score	Opposition Score	Opposition Score	Opposition Score	Rank
Tomáš Berdych	Singles	Yu Xy (CHN); W 6–1, 6–2	Seppi (ITA); W 6–3, 7–6^{(7–4)}	Federer (SUI); L 3–6, 6–7^{(4–7)}	Did not advance			
Ivo Minář	Singles	Rochus (BEL); L 3–6, 6–3, 3–6	Did not advance					
Radek Štěpánek	Singles	Llodra (FRA); L 6–4, 6–7^{(5–7)}, 9–11	Did not advance					
Jiří Vaněk	Singles	Youzhny (RUS); L 4–6, 1–6	Did not advance					
Tomáš Berdych; Radek Štěpánek	Doubles	—N/a	Melo / Sá (BRA); L 7–5, 2–6, 6–8	Did not advance				
Martin Damm; Pavel Vízner	Doubles	—N/a	Djokovic / Zimonjić (SRB); W 3–6, 6–0, 6–2	Fyrstenberg / Matkowski (POL); L 6–1, 6–7^{(3–7)}, 5–7	Did not advance			

Women

Athlete	Event	Round of 64	Round of 32	Round of 16	Quarterfinals	Semifinals	Final / BM	
Athlete	Event	Opposition Score	Opposition Score	Opposition Score	Opposition Score	Opposition Score	Opposition Score	Rank
Iveta Benešová	Singles	Mirza (IND); W 6–2, 2–1^{r}	V Williams (USA); L 1–6, 4–6	Did not advance				
Lucie Šafářová	Singles	Ani (EST); W 6–4, 6–2	Koryttseva (UKR); W 2–6, 6–1, 7–5	Bammer (AUT); L 5–7, 4–6	Did not advance			
Nicole Vaidišová	Singles	Cornet (FRA); L 6–4, 1–6, 4–6	Did not advance					
Klára Zakopalová	Singles	Llagostera Vives (ESP); L 6–2, 3–6, 5–7	Did not advance					
Iveta Benešová; Nicole Vaidišová	Doubles	—N/a	S Williams / V Williams (USA); L 6–4, 5–7, 1–6	Did not advance				
Petra Kvitová; Lucie Šafářová	Doubles	—N/a	Stosur / Stubbs (AUS); L 1–6, 0–6	Did not advance				

== Triathlon ==
Athlete	Event	Swim (1.5 km)	Trans 1	Bike (40 km)	Trans 2	Run (10 km)	Total Time	Rank
Filip Ospalý	Men's	18:17	0:30	58:56	0:29	32:41	1:50:53.69	20
Vendula Frintová	Women's	20:53	0:31	1:05:29	0:28	36:06	2:03:27.49	23
Lenka Zemanová	Women's	20:00	0:28	Did not finish				

== Weightlifting ==
Athlete	Event	Snatch		Clean & Jerk		Total	Rank
Athlete	Event	Result	Rank	Result	Rank	Total	Rank
Libor Wälzer	Men's −105 kg	163	16	187	15	350	15

== Wrestling ==
Key:

- VT – Victory by Fall.
- PP – Decision by Points – the loser with technical points.
- PO – Decision by Points – the loser without technical points.

Men's Greco-Roman

Athlete	Event	Qualification	Round of 16	Quarterfinal	Semifinal	Repechage 1	Repechage 2	Final / BM	
Athlete	Event	Opposition Result	Opposition Result	Opposition Result	Opposition Result	Opposition Result	Opposition Result	Opposition Result	Rank
Marek Švec	−96 kg	Bye	Dinchev (BUL); W 3–1 ^{PP}	Nozadze (GEO); W 3–1 ^{PP}	Khushtov (RUS); L 0–5 ^{VT}	Bye		Mambetov (KAZ); L 1–3 ^{PP}	3rd place, bronze medalist(s)

- Marek Švec originally finished fifth, but in November 2016, he was promoted to bronze due to disqualification of Asset Mambetov.
