= Neffe =

Neffe is a German surname, meaning nephew. Notable people with the surname include:

- Jürgen Neffe (born 1956), German writer
- Karel Neffe (1948–2020), Czech rower
- Karel Neffe Jr. (born 1985), Czech rower

== See also ==
- Frankie & Neffe, an American TV series
- Neffes
