= Fold (album) =

Studio album by Epicure
- Released: 7 August 2000.
- Studios: Texan Mansion; St. Andrew's; Black Beach
- Genre: Rock
- Label: Flugelhorn/MGM Distribution
- Producer: Cameron McKenzie/Epicure

Epicure chronology
Fold (2000)	Airmail (2001)

Fold is the debut album by Australian rock band Epicure, which was issued on 7 August 2000. It was co-produced by the band with Cameron McKenzie for Flugelhorn Records/MGM Distribution.

== Track listing ==
- All music composed by Epicure, lyrics written by Juan Alban.
1. "Calm"
2. "Feet from Under Me"
3. "Johnny Venus"
4. "Son Shine"
5. "Bottom of a Well"
6. "Lights Out!"
7. "Fly the Flag"
8. "Opportunity's Knocking"
9. "Sunsilk Girl"
10. "On Hold"
11. "Joy Committee"
12. "Last Dance"

== Singles ==
- "Feet from Under Me"

== Personnel ==
Epicure

- Juan Alban – vocals, guitar
- Tim Bignell – bass guitar
- Michael "Brownie" Brown – guitar
- Luke Cairnes – guitar
- Dom Santamaria – drums

Production and artwork

- Produced – Cameron McKenzie and Epicure. Recorded at Texan Mansion Studio, St. Andrew's Studio, Black Beach Studio.
- Artwork – Tim Bignell
