= Newlin =

Newlin is a surname, and may refer to:

- Brett Newlin (born 1982), American rower
- Dika Newlin (1923–2006), American musician
- Jacquiline Alice Newlin (1906–1995), or 'Alice Day', actress
- Kristen Newlin (born 1985), Turkish-American basketball player
- Marceline Newlin (1908–2000), younger sister of Alice
- Maury Newlin (1914–1978), Major League Baseball player
- Melvin E. Newlin (1948–1967), Medal of Honor recipient
- Mike Newlin (born 1949), American basketball player
- Sarah Newlin, fictional character in True Blood
- Steve Newlin, fictional character in True Blood
