= Elevator (EP) =

EP by Epicure
- Released: October 15, 2001.
- Genre: Rock
- Label: Flugelhorn
- Producer: Cameron McKenzie

Epicure chronology
The Means to an End (2001)	Elevator (2001)	Life Sentence (2003)

Elevator is an EP by the rock band Epicure. It was released in 2001 on Flugelhorn Records.

== Track listing ==
1. "The Angel's Wings"
2. "Under Your Radar"
3. "Listens To The Rain"
4. "Together We're Apart"
5. "Bank Of Affection"

== Notes ==
- All songs written by Epicure.
- Produced by: Cameron McKenzie, at Station Place and Woodstock Studios. Robyn Mai assisted at Woodstock Studios.
- Mixed by Cameron McKenzie at Station Place, Melbourne.
