= Yevgeni Nosov =

Yevgeni Nosov may refer to:

- Yevgeny Nosov (writer) (1925–2002), Russian writer
- Yevgeny Nosov (rower) (born 1983), Belarusian rower
