= Honzák =

Honzák (feminine: Honzáková) is a Czech surname. It is derived from Honza, which is a pet form of the name Jan (derived from its German form Hans). Notable people with the surname include:

- Anna Honzáková (born 1993), Czech medical doctor
- Lenka Honzáková (born 1978), Czech gymnast

== See also ==
- Honza, Czech archetypal stock character
- Samuel Honzek (born 2004), Slovak ice hockey player
