= Life Sentence (EP) =

EP by Epicure
- Released: September 1, 2003
- Genre: Rock
- Label: Independent/MGM Distribution
- Producer: Cameron McKenzie/Steve James

Epicure chronology
Elevator (2001)	Life Sentence (2003)	Self Destruct In Five (2004)

Life Sentence is an EP released on September 1, 2003 by Epicure.

== Track listing ==
1. "Life Sentence"
2. "Dark Room Candle Burning"
3. "Armies Against Me"
4. "Now I've Found You"
5. "Isolate"

== Notes ==
- All songs written by Epicure.
- Tracks 1,2 and 4 were recorded and mixed by Cameron McKenzie at Station Place.
- Track 3 was recorded by Cameron McKenzie and mixed by Chris Dickie.
- Track 5 was recorded and mixed by Steve James at Festival Studios, Sydney.
- Artwork by Tim Bignell.

== Charts ==
Chart (2003)	Peak position
Australia (ARIA Charts)	77
