= Fly the Flag =

Fly The Flag may refer to

- Fly The Flag, British Airways ad campaign and promotional song and single
- Fly the Flag (album), Down By Law album
- Fly the Flags, Stiff Little Fingers album
- "Fly the Flag", song by Epicure from Fold (album)
- "Fly the Flag", song by Stiff Little Fingers from Nobody's Heroes (album)
- "Fly the Flag", song by B'z from The Circle (B'z album)
- "Fly the Flag", song by Fallout (band) 1982
