= Airmail (album) =

Compilation album by Epicure
- Released: 15 October 2001
- Genre: Rock
- Label: Flugelhorn/MGM
- Producer: Cameron McKenzie

Epicure chronology
Fold (2001)	Airmail (2001)	The Goodbye Girl (2004)

Professional ratings
Review scores
Source	Rating
Ear Medicine	4/5 stars

Airmail is a compilation album by Australian rock band Epicure. It was released on 15 October 2001. The Album is a collection of Epicure's previous EPs (Opportunity's Knocking, Means to an End), b-sides, and unreleased songs from Fold sessions packaged into one album.

== Track listing ==
1. "Nod & Smile"
2. "I'm a Boy"
3. "Airmail"
4. "By Ourselves, For Ourselves"
5. "One of Us"
6. "Hand Me Down"
7. "Andy's Song"
8. "Gentle like a Tidal Wave"
9. "Momento Mori"
10. "The System"
11. "Clean Love"
12. "A.Y.M"
13. "Closure"

== Notes ==
- Produced by Cameron McKenzie and Epicure.
- Recorded and mixed by Cameron McKenzie at Station Place, Melbourne.
