= Life Sentence (disambiguation) =

A life sentence is a term of imprisonment for a crime that is intended to last for life.

Life Sentence may also refer to:

- Life Sentence (TV series), an American TV series
- Life Sentence (EP), a 2003 EP by Epicure
- Life Sentence (film), a 1933 Polish drama film
- "Life Sentence" (Arrow), a 2018 television episode
- "Life Sentence" (Waking the Dead), a 2002 television episode
- "Life Sentence", a song by J. Cole from his album The Fall-Off (2026)

== See also ==
- Life Sentence to Love, an album by Legal Weapon
