= Tomaž Pirih =

Slovenian rower

Tomaž Pirih (born 12 June 1981 in Jesenice) is a Slovenian rower who represented Slovenia at the 2008 Summer Olympics, Men's coxless four. His brother Miha Pirih is also an Olympic rower.
