= Zhang Xingbo =

Zhang Xingbo may refer to:

- Zhang Xingbo (footballer)
- Zhang Xingbo (rower)
