= The Goodbye Girl (album) =

Studio album by Epicure
- Released: 8 March 2004
- Genre: Rock
- Label: Flugelhorn
- Producer: Cameron McKenzie, Epicure

Epicure chronology
Airmail (2004)	The Goodbye Girl (2004)	Main Street (2005)

The Goodbye Girl is the second studio album by Australian rock band Epicure. It was released on 8 March 2004 on Flugelhorn Records via MGM Distribution. It peaked at No. 88 on the ARIA Albums Chart, No. 20 on the Australasian Artists Albums and No. 5 on the Hitseekers Albums charts.

Professional ratings
Review scores
Source	Rating
Ear Medicine	4/5 stars

== Track listing ==
1. "Goodbye Girl" - 3:07
2. "Armies Against Me" - 5:11
3. "Firing Squad" - 4:15
4. "Sunlight (for Bronwyn)" - 4:47
5. "So Broken" - 4:23
6. "Life Sentence" - 4:49
7. "Twelve Months of Winter" - 4:52
8. "Clay Pigeons" - 6:48
9. "Self Destruct in Five" - 4:02
10. "Rainy Day" - 4:35
11. "No-one's Listening" - 4:58
12. "Distant Seas" - 7:14

== Personnel ==
- Produced by Cameron McKenzie and Epicure.
- Recorded and mixed by Cameron McKenzie at Station Place, Melbourne, except for "Firing Squad", which was mixed by Chris Dickie.

== Charts ==
Chart (2004)	Peak position
Australian Albums (ARIA Charts)	88
