= Jan Gruber =

Czech rower

Medal record

Men's rowing

Representing Czech Republic

European Rowing Championships
Gold medal – first place	2007 Poznań	Coxless four
Bronze medal – third place	2010 Montemor-o-Velho	Coxless four

Jan Gruber (born 15 March 1984, in Prague) is a Czech rower. He competed for the Czech Republic as a member of the men's coxless four team which finished 5th at the 2008 Summer Olympics.

== See also ==
- Czech Republic at the 2008 Summer Olympics#Rowing

== Bibliography ==
- Jan Gruber at World Rowing
- Evans, Hilary; Gjerde, Arild; Heijmans, Jeroen; Mallon, Bill; et al. "Jan Gruber". Olympics at Sports-Reference.com. Sports Reference LLC. Archived from the original on 16 July 2011.
