= Andrey Demyanenko =

Belarusian rower

Personal information
- Nationality: Belarusian
- Born: 13 April 1984 (age 40); Gomel, Belarus

Sport
- Sport: Rowing

Andrey Demyanenko (born 13 April 1984) is a Belarusian rower. He competed in the men's coxless four event at the 2008 Summer Olympics.
