= Epicure (band) =

Australian musical group

- Also known as: Pima's Little Finger
- Origin: Ballarat, Victoria, Australia
- Genres: Progressive rock; alternative rock
- Years active: 1997–2010, 2025–present
- Labels: Flugelhorn; Independent; MGM
- Past members: Juan Alban; Tim Bignell; Michael Brown; Luke Cairnes; Dom Santamaria; Dan Houlihan; Dean Shannon; Heath McCurdy; Mick Hubbard; Josh Murphy

Epicure is an Australian progressive rock band formed in Ballarat in 1996, originally called Pima's Little Finger. Their original line-up was Juan Alban on vocals and guitar, Tim Bignell on bass guitar, Michael Brown on guitar, Luke Cairnes on guitar, and Dom Santamaria on drums. "Armies Against Me" and "Life Sentence", were picked up by national youth radio station Triple J; these songs appeared on The Goodbye Girl (March 2004), their third album. Both tracks were listed on the Triple J Hottest 100, 2003, whilst the title track of their next extended play, Self Destruct in Five (October 2004), made the Triple J Hottest 100, 2004.

In late 2003, they supported United States rock group Live on their Australian tour. They played at the Big Day Out festival in January 2004 and at both Falls Festivals in December. The group disbanded in mid-2010 after a final tour, Quietly into the Night.

In December 2025, Epicure announced their return, and released their first single in over 15 years, Is There Any Way Out Now, in July 2026. They followed this by announcing their latest album, Evenings in Honduras, which was released in August 2026.

== History ==
Epicure started in 1996 as a school rock band, Pima's Little Finger, with its five original members being Juan Alban, Michael 'Brownie' Brown, Tim Bignell, Dom Santamaria and Luke Cairnes. They played their first gig at the Dunnstown Football Club and were booed off stage in favour of Cold Chisel. They released their first recording in 1996, a demo tape entitled The Least of These. Their base in Ballarat's local live music scene was The Rat at the Bridge Mall Inn (now closed). After they released their first extended play, The Means to an End (1997), they were signed to Flugelhorn Records and managed by Mark Eatock, who bought the Bridge Mall Inn in early 1999. Triple J radio helped bring Epicure to the Australian consciousness when they added "Feet from Under Me" and "Johnny Venus" to their playlists in 2000. Both appeared on their debut album, Fold (August 2000).

Shortly after the release of their second EP, Elevator (October 2001), Brown and Cairnes both left and were replaced by Dan Houlihan on lead guitar and Dean Shannon on keyboard. This brought a new feeling to the band, and Shannon became popular with the crowds for his showmanship. In the same month, they issued their second album, Airmail, which is a compilation of their previous EPs. Their third EP, Life Sentence, was independently released with distribution by MGM on 1 September 2003. It peaked at No. 77 on the ARIA Singles Chart. It was recorded by Cam MacKenzie, with tracks mixed by producer Chris Dickie.

During that year, both "Armies Against Me" and "Life Sentence", were picked up by Triple J. These appeared on their third album, The Goodbye Girl (March 2004), which peaked at No. 88 on the ARIA Albums Chart. The band spent 2003–04 touring Australia, particularly in regional areas. They supported shows by Pete Murray, the Beautiful Girls, Xavier Rudd, the Whitlams, and Monique Brumby. A dispute between the band and Shannon occurred in mid-2004, which resulted in his replacement on keyboards by Heath McCurdy. Their third full-length album, Main Street, was released in October 2005, and it provided the single "Tightrope Walker".

In late 2006, Houlihan was replaced by Mick Hubbard (ex–Jen Cloher) on lead guitar. During June–July 2007, the band took a break from recording their next album, Postcards from a Ghost, and played support slots for Mia Dyson on the east coast of Australia. Epicure posted a video of recording sessions on Myspace and asked fans to choose between "Landslide" and "Cobra Kisses" for the album's lead single; "Cobra Kisses" was chosen and issued. Postcards from a Ghost followed in October 2008 via Down in Flames/MGM. For the album, in addition to the core band members, they used session musicians Chris Brodieon on pedal steel guitar; Jason Bunn on viola; Dani Fry and Sianne Lee on backing vocals; Caewen Martin on cello; Jodi Moore on electric violin; Stu Syme on tambourine; Jenny Thomas on violin; and Erki Veltheim on viola. In February 2010, the band announced their final tour, Quietly into the Night, before disbanding in May.

=== Afterwards ===
Juan Alban issued his debut solo extended play, Too Long in Flight, in March 2011.

=== Return ===
In late 2025, the band announced via social media that they would be returning and releasing new music. They released their first single in over 15 years, Is There Any Way Out Now, in July 2026, and released two further EPs shortly after. They followed this by announcing their latest album, Evenings in Honduras, which was released in August 2026.

== Members ==
- Juan Alban (Vocals/Guitar) 1996–2010, 2025–present
- Tim Bignell (Bass) 1996–2010, 2025–present
- Dom Santamaria (Drums) 1996–2010, 2025–present
- Michael Brown (Guitar / Misc Sounds) 1996–2001
- Luke Cairnes (Guitar) 1996–2001
- Dean Shannon (Keyboard) 2002–2004
- Dan Houlihan (Guitar) 2002–2005
- Heath McCurdy (Keyboard) 2004–2009
- Mick Hubbard (Lead Guitar) 2005–2009
- Josh Murphy (Lead Guitar) 2009–2010

== Discography ==
=== Studio albums ===
List of albums, with Australian chart positions
Title	Album details	Peak chart positions
Title	Album details	AUS
Fold	Released: August 2000; Format: CD; Label: Flugelhorn (FH0005)	-
The Goodbye Girl	Released: March 2004; Format: CD; Label: Epicure (EPI 003)	88
Main Street	Released: October 2005; Format: CD; Label: Epicure (EPI 005)	-
Postcards from a Ghost	Released: October 2008; Format: CD; Label: Epicure (EPI 007)	-
Evenings in Honduras	Released: August 2026; Format: CD, Vinyl, Digital; Label: Epicure (EPI 009)	-

=== Compilations ===
List of compilations albums, with selected details
Title	Details
Airmail	Released: October 2001; Format: CD; Label: Flugelhorn (FH0000)
Quietly into the Night – Epicure Anthology	Released: April 2010; Format: CD, Digital; Label: Epicure (EPI 008)

=== Extended plays ===
List of EPs, with Australian chart positions
Title	Album details	Peak chart positions
Title	Album details	AUS
The Means to an End	Released: 1997; Format: CD; Label: Flugelhorn	-
Elevator	Released: October 2001; Format: CD; Label: Flugelhorn	-
Armies Against Me	Released: 2002; Format: CD; Label: Epicure (EPI 001)	-
Life Sentence	Released: September 2003; Format: CD; Label: Epicure (EPI 002)	77
Self Destruct in Five	Released: October 2004; Format: CD; Label: Epicure (EPI 004)	-
