= Niccolò Mornati =

Italian rower

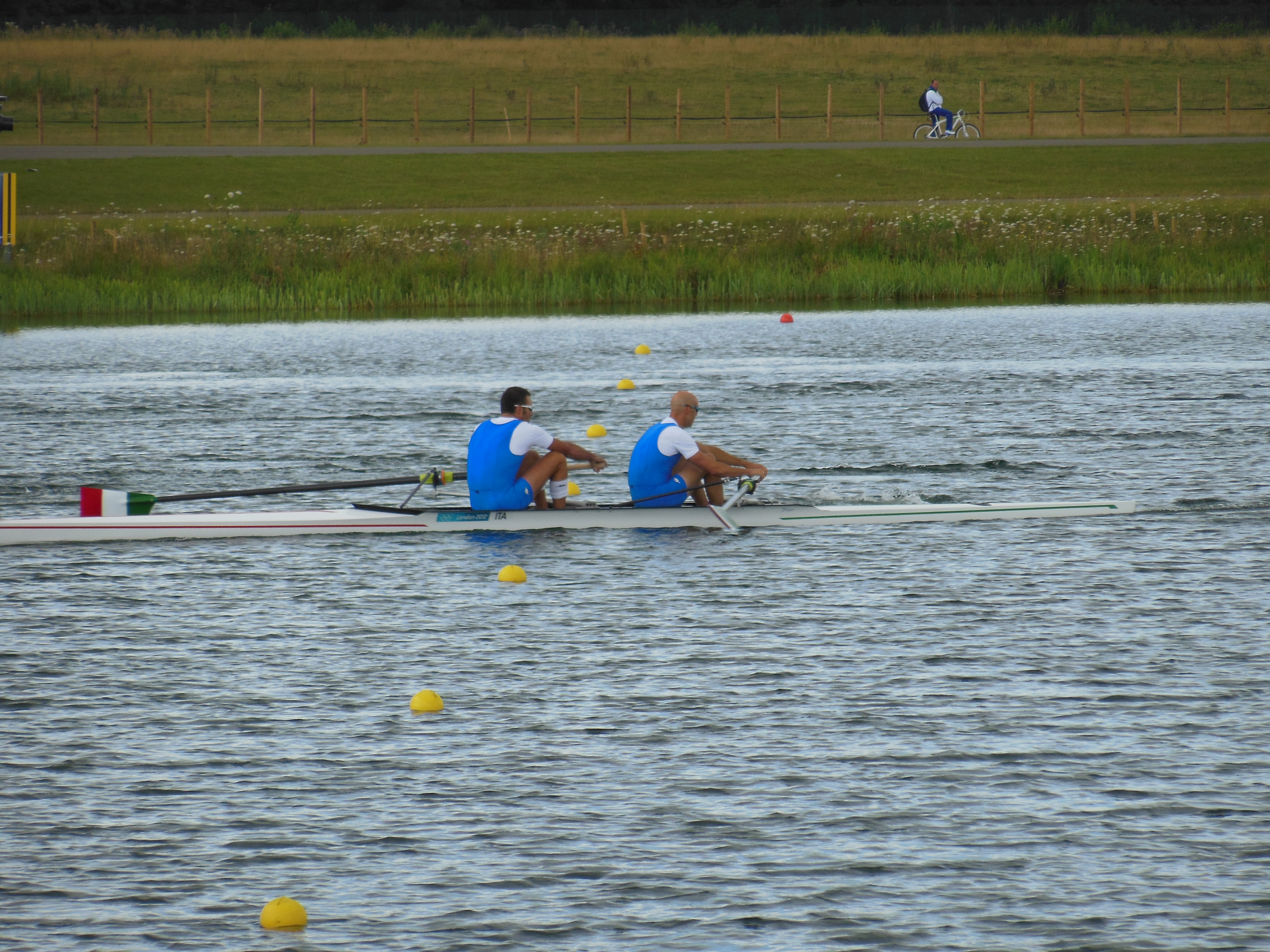
- Mornati (on the left))

Personal information
- Nationality: Italian
- Born: 28 October 1980 (age 45) Milan, Italy

Sport
- Sport: Rowing
Medal record
World Rowing Championships
Silver medal – second place	2005 Gifu	M8+
Silver medal – second place	2006 Eton	M8+
Silver medal – second place	2007 Munich	M4-
Bronze medal – third place	2002 Seville	M4-
Bronze medal – third place	2011 Bled	M2-

Niccolò Mornati (born 28 October 1980) is a former Italian rower. During the London Olympics he came in fourth with his partner Carboncini, and was then embroiled in a blog attack on Enrico Gandola, president of the Italian Rowing Federation. Gandola told Mornati "Stay in your boat."

== Biography ==
He also competed at the 2004 Olympics in the men's eight and at the 2008 Olympics in the men's coxless four. On 29 April 2016 it was announced that he had been suspended after a positive doping test.

On 14 November 2016, the National Anti-Doping Court, presided over by lawyer Luigi Fumagalli, declares not proven the existence of an intentional violation of the anti-doping code and recognizes the athlete was unaware to commit an illicit, thus restating the disqualification period On 8 February 2017, the Athlete presents to the Public Prosecutor of Rome Court a complaint against unknown person.

On 3 October 2018 the single presiding Judge of Terni Court, Dr Fornaro, delivered a not-guilty verdict (full-acquittal) because the fact does not constitute a violation. The Judge established that Mornati did not commit any criminal offence and his ingestion was unconscious, involuntary and not aimed at altering sports performance. Mornati's first declaration was "I am feeling relieved that my good faith and my integrity have been recognized in front of the Judge. The whole story has embittered me a lot, because I have been focusing my 20 years sport career and my whole life on honesty and upright morals, never accepting unfair behavior. I am happy this sentence highlights my innocence".
