= Giuseppe Lanzone =

American rower

Medal record

Men's rowing

Representing United States

World Rowing Championships
Bronze medal – third place	2006 Eton	M8+

Giuseppe Lanzone (born October 12, 1982, in La Punta, Peru) is an American rower and 2005 graduate of the University of Washington. He attended and rowed for McLean High School, graduating in 2001, before going to the University of Washington. He was the 2004 and 2005 All Pac-10 Team Rower of the Year, and the 2010 US Rowing Male Athlete of the Year. Along with his teammates he finished 9th in the men's coxless four at the 2008 Summer Olympics. He was in the men's 8+ that finished fourth at the 2012 Summer Olympics in London. He worked at Sparks Consulting, a social business that is concerned with rowing community development during his national team and Olympic training. Was the former head lightweight coach at Georgetown University.

Lanzone and his brother Mario own the Peruvian Brothers food truck, serving Peruvian-style sandwiches, salads and empanadas in the Washington, D.C., area. The two started the business after the 2012 Summer Olympics.
