= Matt Ryan (rower) =

Australian rower (born 1984)

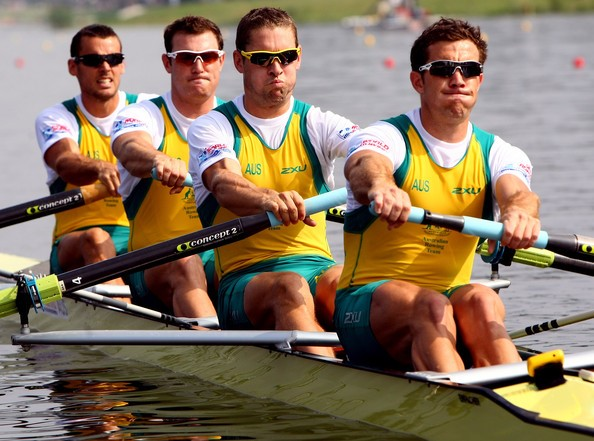
- From left to right: Matt Ryan, James Marburg, Cameron McKenzie-McHarg, and Francis Hegerty

Personal information
- Born: 23 June 1984 (age 42)
- Relative: Cara Feain-Ryan (cousin)

Sport
- Sport: Rowing
Medal record
Representing Australia
Men's rowing
Olympic Games
Silver medal – second place	2008 Beijing	Coxless four
World Rowing Championships
Silver medal – second place	2009 Poznań	M4-
Bronze medal – third place	2010 Karapiro	M8+

Matthew Ryan (born 23 June 1984 in Sydney) is a retired Australian rower, a dual Olympian and Olympic medal winner. Ryan competed at the 2008 Summer Olympics, where he won a silver medal in Coxless four. In London 2012 he rowed in the Australian men's eight which placed 6th.

== Education ==
Ryan began his rowing at The King's School, Parramatta and was in the school's 1st VIIIs of 2001 and 2002 who won the AAGPS Head of the River. The 2001 crew contained future Australian senior national rowers Nicholas Hudson and Sam Loch, and went on to win the Barrington Cup and be crowned National Schoolboy champions. The 2001 crew won the Princess Elizabeth Challenge Cup at the 2001 Henley Royal Regatta.

== Club and state rowing ==
In 2005, Ryan was part of the Sydney University Boat Club crew who won the QL Deloitte Trophy as the Champion VIII of New South Wales, breaking a four-year winning streak of UTS Haberfield Rowing Club. It was the start of a 10-year winning streak for the Sydney University Boat Club in this event from 2005 to 2014.

Ryan was part of the successful New South Wales Kings Cup crew who had a breakthrough win in 2008, defeating holders Victoria by just 0.21 seconds. It was the start of a 7-year winning streak for New South Wales in this event, with Ryan being a member of the crew every year.

== National representative rowing ==
Ryan was first selected to compete for Australia in 2002, when he stroked the Australian junior coxed four to a gold medal at the World Junior Championships in Trakai, Lithuania.

Continuing to move through the underage ranks, Ryan was a bronze medallist in 2003 in the Men's VIII at the Nations Cup regatta (now the World Under 23 Championships) in Belgrade, Serbia. The following year, Ryan returned to the top of the podium at the World Under 23 Regatta in Poznan, Poland in an all-New South Wales, coxed four.

In 2005, Ryan made in debut in the senior Australian team, placing 9th at the World Championships in Gifu, Japan. The following year, Ryan placed 4th as part of the Men's Eight in Eton, United Kingdom. The next year in Munich, Germany, Ryan's crew placed 2nd in the B Final of the Men's VIII behind Russia to place 8th overall. This was later improved to a 7th placing overall due to the members of the Russian crew failing doping tests.

Ryan made his Olympic debut in 2008 in Beijing, China. Rowing Australia had originally selected the coxless pair and eight as the priority sweep rowing crews as they had already qualified for the Olympic Games from the results at the World Championships the previous year. Ryan was selected in the Coxless Four alongside fellow Sydney University Boat Club member Francis Hegerty, as well as Victorians, James Marburg and Cameron McKenzie-McHarg. The crew won their event at the first world cup regatta in Lucerne, Switzerland. The crew then turned their attention to the Olympic Qualification Regatta in Poznan. Ryan was struck down by illness and had to be replaced for the race by fellow Sydney University Boat Club member Terrence Alfred and the crew achieved qualification for the Olympic Games. In Beijing, the crew led for a large part of the race before placing second behind the race favourites from Great Britain.

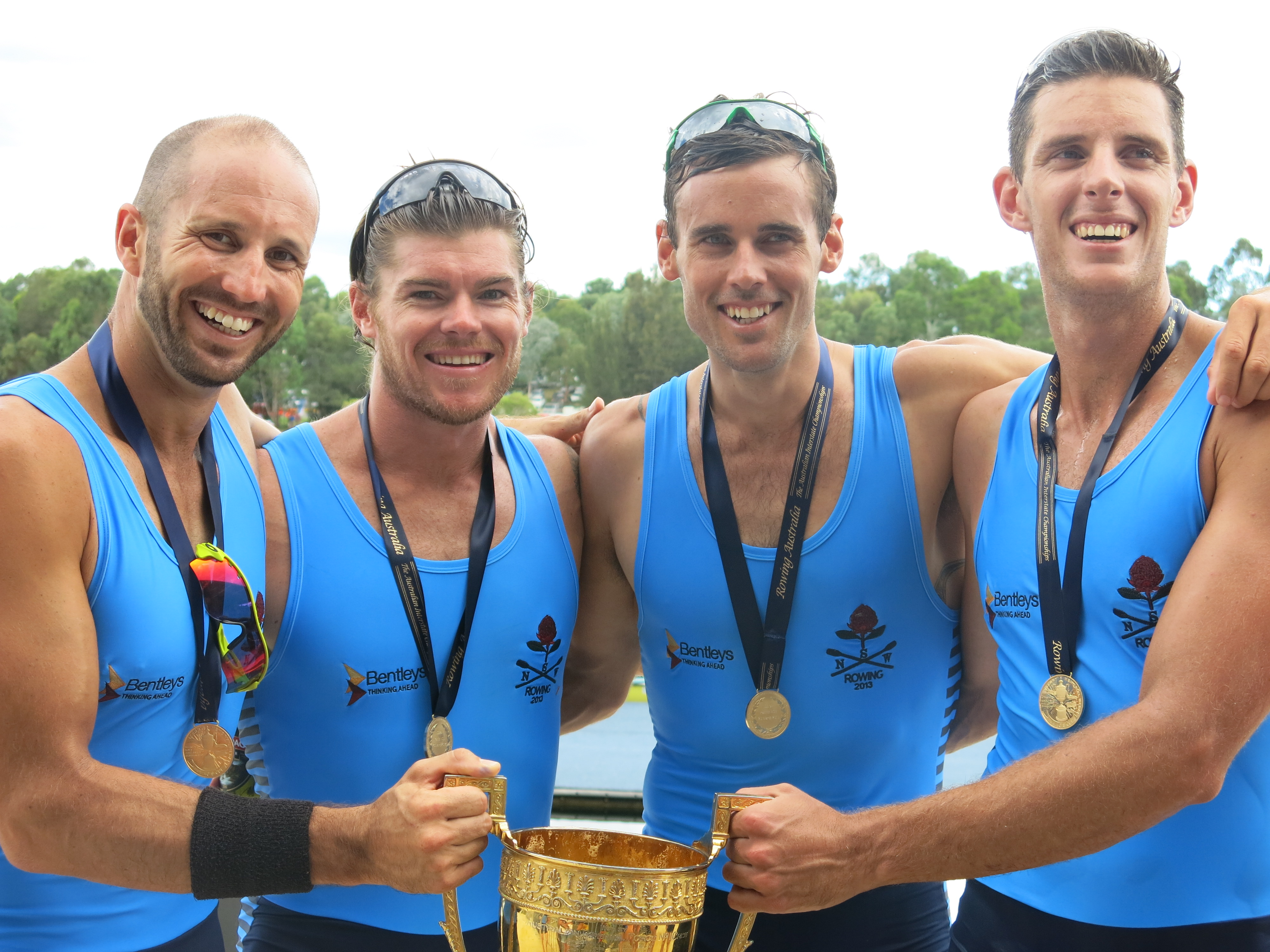
James Chapman, Sam Loch, Ryan & Fergus Pragnell with the Kings Cup in 2013 - the 6th time each oarsman won the event.

In 2009, Ryan was again part of the Australian coxless four who won the silver medal behind Great Britain in Poznan. The following year he moved into the VIII which won Bronze at Lake Karapiro, New Zealand. At the 2011 World Rowing Championships in Bled, Slovenia, Ryan placed fourth as a member of the Men's VIII which qualified the boat for the London Olympic Games.

At the London Olympic Games, Ryan was in the bow seat of the Australian Men's VIII which placed 6th in a thrilling final where all boats finished within a length of each other.

In 2013, Ryan took a break from international competition and during this period set a 24-hour tandem world record on the Concept 2 rowing machine (ergometer) with Sam Loch. The pair covered 380.274 kilometres, maintaining an average split of 1:53.6 per 500 metres. The successful world record attempt was also a fundraiser for the Leukaemia Foundation and raised almost $20,000 AUD for the charity.

Ryan returned to the National Team in 2015 in the Men's VIII . The crew placed 9th at the World Rowing Championships in Aiguebelette, France.
