= Main Street (Epicure album) =

Studio album by Epicure
- Released: 17 October 2005
- Genre: Rock
- Label: Independent release/MGM Distribution
- Producer: Chris Thompson/Epicure

Epicure chronology
The Goodbye Girl (2004)	Main Street (2005)

Main Street is an album by Australian rock band Epicure. It was released on 17 October 2005.

== Track listing ==
1. "Down in Flames"
2. "Pack My Parachute"
3. "Tightrope Walker"
4. "Lyla's Kisses"
5. "Blow Those Blues Away"
6. "Main Street"
7. "Amen"
8. "Like You Just Don't Care"
9. "Eve Clover"
10. "I'll Come Back for You"
11. "She Don't Stay for the Sunrise"
12. "Hoping It's Not Hopeless"

== Notes ==
- All songs written by Epicure.
- Produced by Chris Thompson and Epicure.
- Recorded at Metropolis and Martin Street.
