= Julien Desprès =

French rower (born 1983)

Medal record

Representing France

Men's rowing
Bronze medal – third place	2008 Beijing	Coxless four

European Championships
Gold medal – first place	2008 Marathon	Double Sculls
Bronze medal – third place	2009 Brest	Eight

World Championships
Gold medal – first place	2010 Karapiro	Coxless four

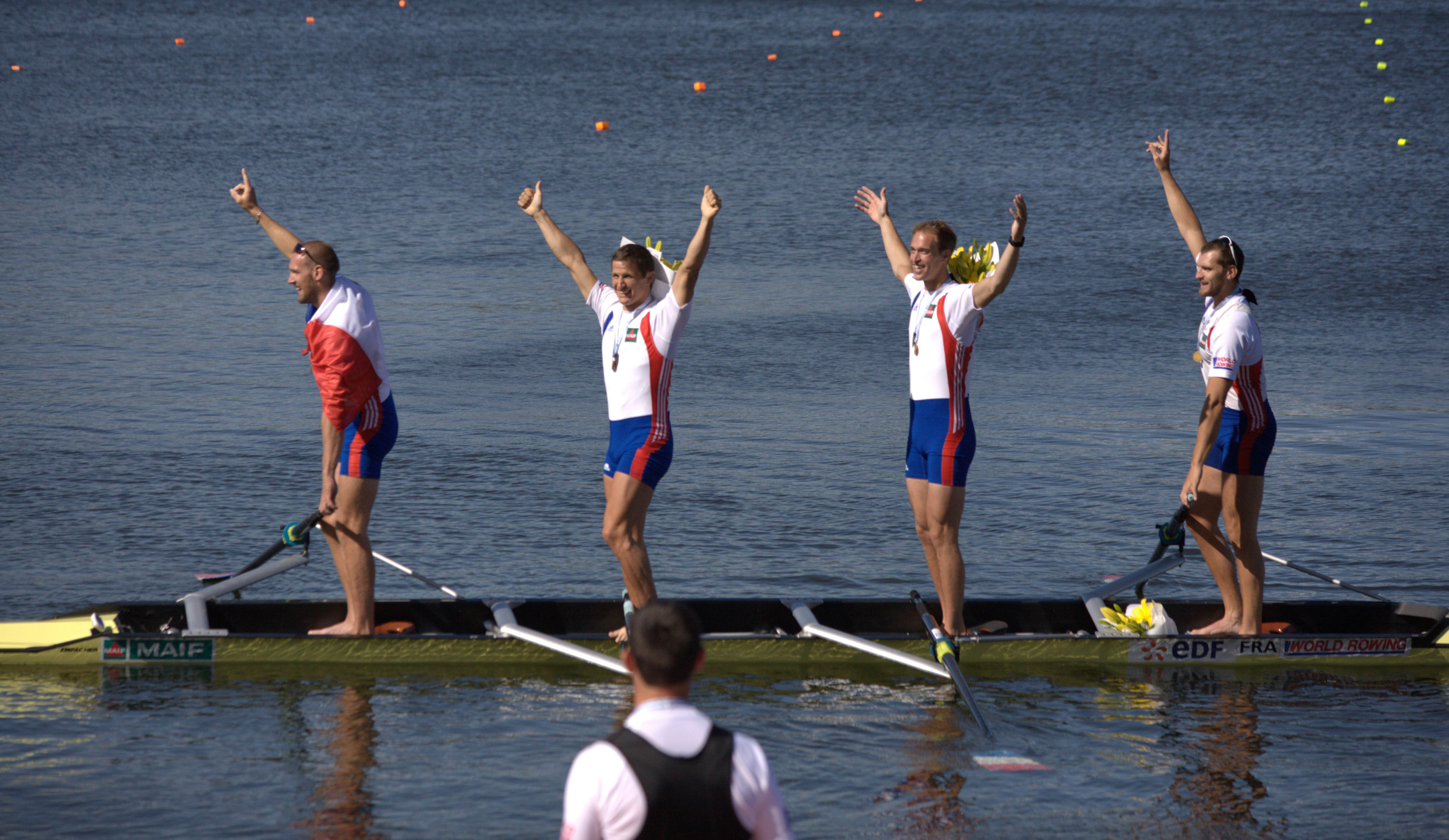
The French M4- team celebrating after their shock win at the 2010 World Rowing Championships in New Zealand

Julien Desprès (born 12 May 1983 in Clamart) is a French rower. He competed at the 2008 Summer Olympics, where he won a bronze medal in Coxless four. In 2010, he won the gold medal at the world rowing championship at Lake Karapiro in New Zealand, rowing in the coxless four, with Jean-Baptiste Macquet, Dorian Mortelette and Germain Chardin. Julien Desprès studied at EM Lyon Business School.
