= Rok Rozman =

Slovenian rower

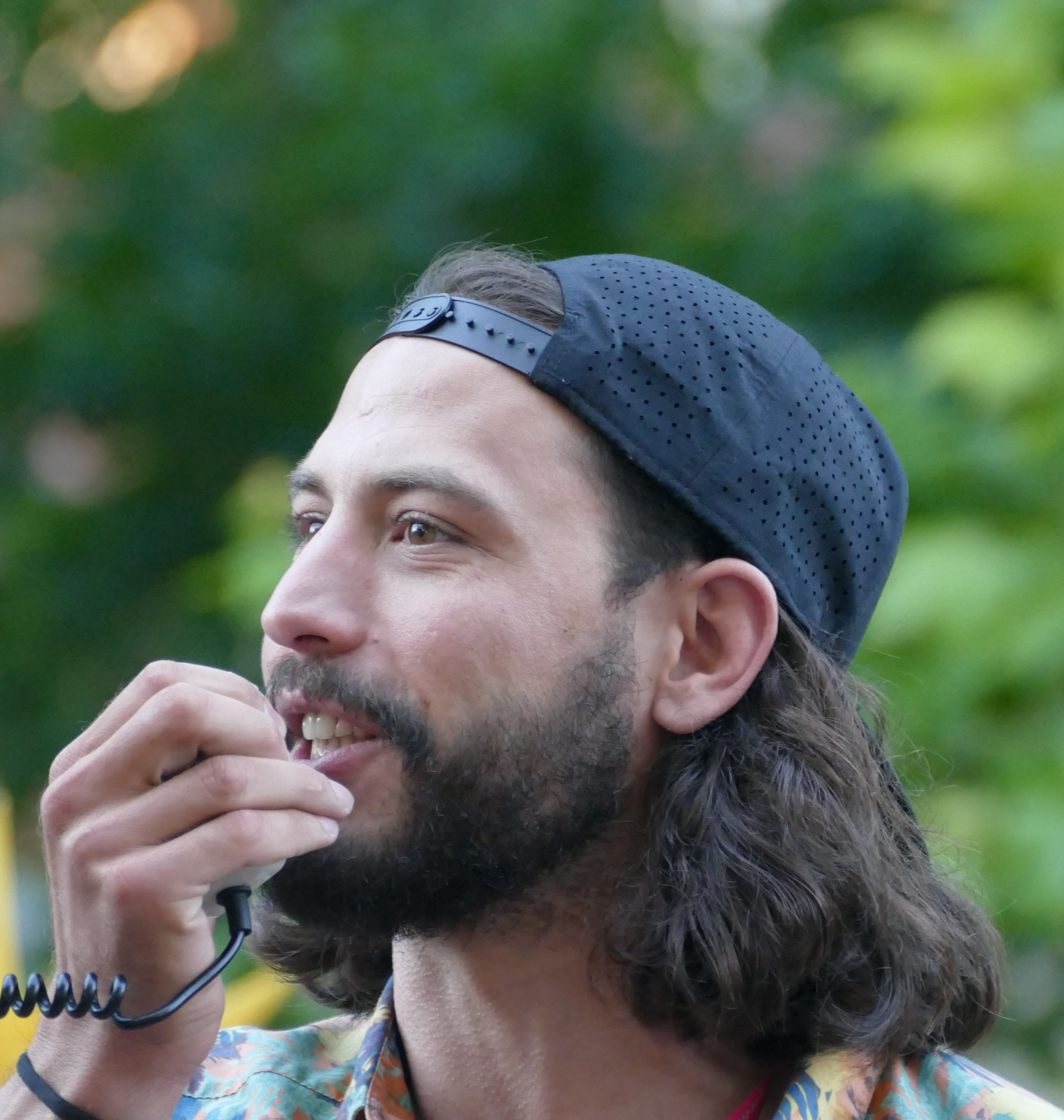
Image of Rok Rozman

Rok Rozman (born 2 January 1988 in Kranj) is a Slovenian rower who represented Slovenia at the 2008 Summer Olympics, Men's coxless four. His team took fourth place.
