= Francis Hegerty =

Australian rower (born 1982)

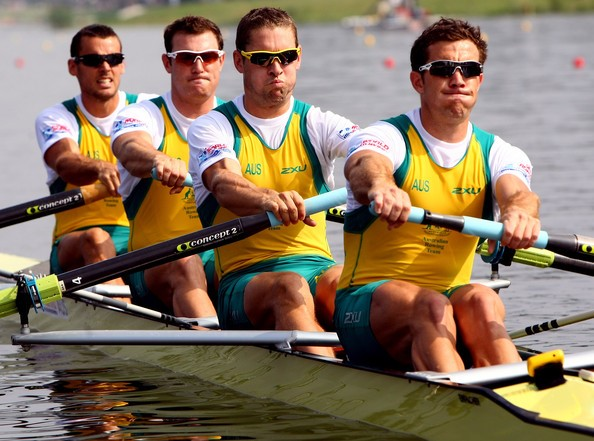
- From left to right: Matt Ryan, James Marburg, Cameron McKenzie-McHarg, and Francis Hegerty

Personal information
- Born: 22 September 1982 (age 43)
- Education: St. Joseph's College, Hunters Hill; University of Sydney

Sport
- Sport: Rowing
- Club: Sydney University Boat Club
Medal record
Representing Australia
Men's rowing
Olympic Games
| Silver medal – second place | 2008 Beijing | Coxless four |
World Rowing Championships
| Silver medal – second place | 2009 Poznan | M4- |
| Bronze medal – third place | 2010 Karapiro | M8+ |

Francis Hegerty (born 22 September 1982, in Canberra) is a former Australian rower - a national champion and a dual Olympian.

== Education ==
Hegerty started his rowing at first at Daramalan College in Canberra and then at St Joseph's College, Hunters Hill. He was a member of the St Joseph's first VIII which placed 2nd at the 1999 AAGPS Head of the River. The following year, Hegerty stroked the school's first VIII to a 3rd-place finish in the 2000 AAGPS Head of the River.

After finishing school, Hegerty completed a Bachelor of Commerce at the University of Sydney and joined Sydney University Boat Club.

== Club and state rowing ==
He first represented New South Wales at state level in the youth eight placing fifth in 2001 and then he achieved a fourth placing in 2002.

Hegerty made his New South Wales senior debut in 2003, racing in his first King's Cup to second place behind Victoria. He represented New South Wales in the King's Cup on eight occasions - 2003, 2005–2008, 2011–2013, winning the event four times in 2008, 2011, 2012 and 2013.

== National representative rowing ==
He made his first Australian team in 2002, placing 4th in the men's eight at the 2002 Nations Cup (now World Under 23 Rowing Championships) in Genoa, Italy. The following year he was again a member of the Australian under 23 men's eight, which this time won a bronze medal at the 2003 Nations Cup in Belgrade, Serbia.

His senior national team debut was at the 2006 World Rowing Championships at Eton Dorney, United Kingdom. Hegerty stroked the Men's Four which placed 3rd in the C Final to place 15th. In 2007, Hegerty was again selected in the Men's Four who placed 12th at the 2007 World Rowing Championships at Munich, Germany. This placing wasn't sufficient for the boat to initially qualify for the 2008 Beijing Olympic Games.

In 2008, Hegerty was again selected in the Men's Coxless Four, this time with Matt Ryan, James Marburg and Cameron McKenzie-McHarg. The crew won their event at the first world cup regatta in Lucerne, Switzerland. The crew then turned their attention to the Olympic Qualification Regatta in Poznan. Ryan was struck down by illness and had to be replaced for the race by fellow Sydney University Boat Club member Terrence Alfred and the crew achieved qualification for the Olympic Games. In Beijing, the crew led for a large part of the race before placing second behind the race favourites from Great Britain to take the silver medal.

Hegerty was selected in an unchanged Men's Coxless Four for the 2009 World Rowing Championships in Poznan, Poland and won a silver medal. In 2010 Hegerty moved in the Australian Men's Eight which won a bronze medal at the 2010 World Rowing Championships at Lake Karapiro, New Zealand. He followed this up with a 4th placing in the Men's Eight at the 2011 World Rowing Championships in Bled, Slovenia.

In London 2012 he rowed in the Australian men's eight which placed 6th.
