= Kristen Newlin =

Turkish American basketball player

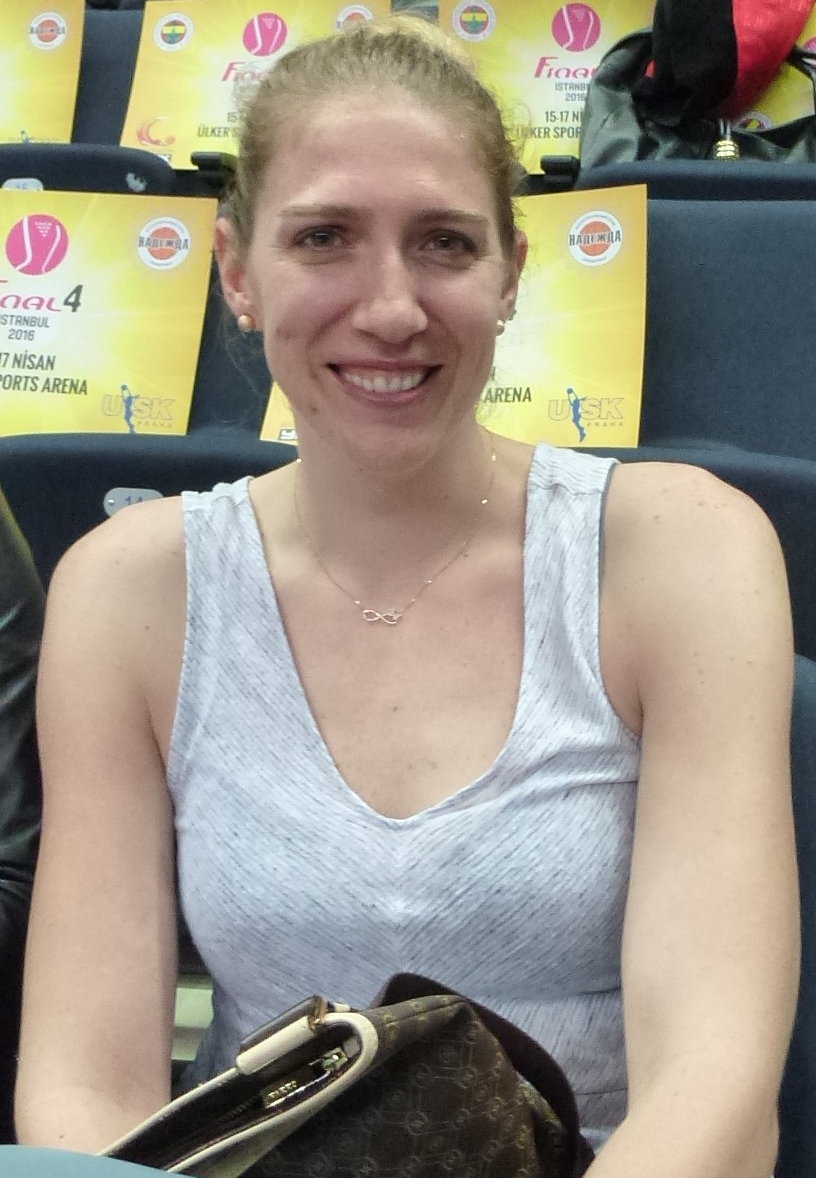

Personal information
- Born: May 8, 1985 (age 41) Kailua, Hawaii, U.S.
- Listed height: 6 ft 5 in (1.96 m)
- Listed weight: 199 lb (90 kg)

Career information
- High school: Riverton (Riverton, Wyoming)
- College: Stanford (2003–2007)
- WNBA draft: 2007: 3rd round, 34th overall pick
- Drafted by: Houston Comets
- Playing career: 2007–2020
- Position: Center
- Number: 43

Career history
- 2007: Botaş SK
- 2007 - 2014: Fenerbahçe
- 2014 - 2019: İstanbul Üniversitesi SK
- 2019 - 2020: Elazığ İl Özel İdarespor

Career highlights
- Pac-10 All-Freshman Team (2004)
- Stats at Basketball Reference

Kristen Michelle Newlin (born May 8, 1985) a.k.a. Nevin Nevlin is a Turkish-American former basketball player at the center position who played mostly for Fenerbahçe Istanbul. Born in Kailua, Hawaii Newlin is 1.96 m and her primary position is center. Nevlin was a member of a EuroLeague Women side of Fenerbahçe Istanbul.

She acquired Turkish citizenship in 2008 and consequently adopted the Turkish name of Nevin. She played for the first time for Turkey against Serbia and scored 7 points in 23 minutes.

On 10 January 2009, she played in the Turkish Women's Basketball League All-Star match.

== Early life ==
She played for Riverton High School in Riverton, Wyoming.

== College career ==
She played for Stanford University in the NCAA with 5,6 ppg, 5,2 rpg (2003–04), 8,2 ppg, 5,0 rpg (2004–05), 8,3 ppg, 6,8 rpg (2005–06) and 7,0 ppg, 7,9 rpg (2005–06).

=== College statistics ===
Legend
GP	Games played	GS	Games started	MPG	Minutes per game
FG%	Field goal percentage	3P%	3-point field goal percentage	FT%	Free throw percentage
RPG	Rebounds per game	APG	Assists per game	SPG	Steals per game
BPG	Blocks per game	PPG	Points per game	**Bold**	Career high

Year	Team	GP	Points	FG%	3P%	FT%	RPG	APG	SPG	BPG	PPG
2003–04	Stanford	30	167	46.4	–	72.5	5.2	0.5	0.4	**1.7**	5.6
2004–05	Stanford	**35**	**287**	**52.1**	**66.7**	**68.5**	5.0	0.8	0.4	0.9	8.2
2005–06	Stanford	26	216	49.4	33.3	54.9	6.8	1.2	**0.4**	1.5	**8.3**
2006–07	Stanford	34	238	51.1	29.7	50.0	**7.9**	**1.3**	0.4	1.3	7.0
Career	Stanford	125	908	50.0	29.6	62.2	6.2	1.0	0.4	1.3	7.3

== WNBA career ==
She drafted 34th overall for Houston Comets in the 2007 WNBA draft, however, on 10 May 2007, she signed a contract with the Indiana Fever.

== Europe career ==
- 2007 (Turkey) Botaş SK
- 2007–2014 (Turkey) Fenerbahçe Istanbul
  - Turkish Championship: 2008, 2009, 2010, 2011, 2012, 2013
  - Turkish Cup: 2008, 2009
  - Turkish Presidents Cup: 2010
- 2014–2019 (Turkey) İstanbul Üniversitesi SK
- 2019–2020 (Turkey) Elazığ İl Özel İdarespor

== International career ==
Newlin plays for Turkey women's national basketball team.

== Personal life ==
Newlin's brother is Brett Newlin, an American rower who won silver in the 2005 World Rowing Championships and competed in the 2008 and 2012 Summer Olympics.

She married Turkish professional basketball coach Emre Vatansever in 2014, and they have three children.

== See also ==
- Turkish women in sports
