= Sean Casey (rower) =

Irish rower

Personal information
- Nationality: Irish
- Born: 5 February 1978 (age 47); Cork, Ireland

Sport
- Sport: Rowing

Sean Casey (born 5 February 1978) is an Irish rower. He competed in the men's coxless four event at the 2008 Summer Olympics.
