= James Marburg =

Australian rower

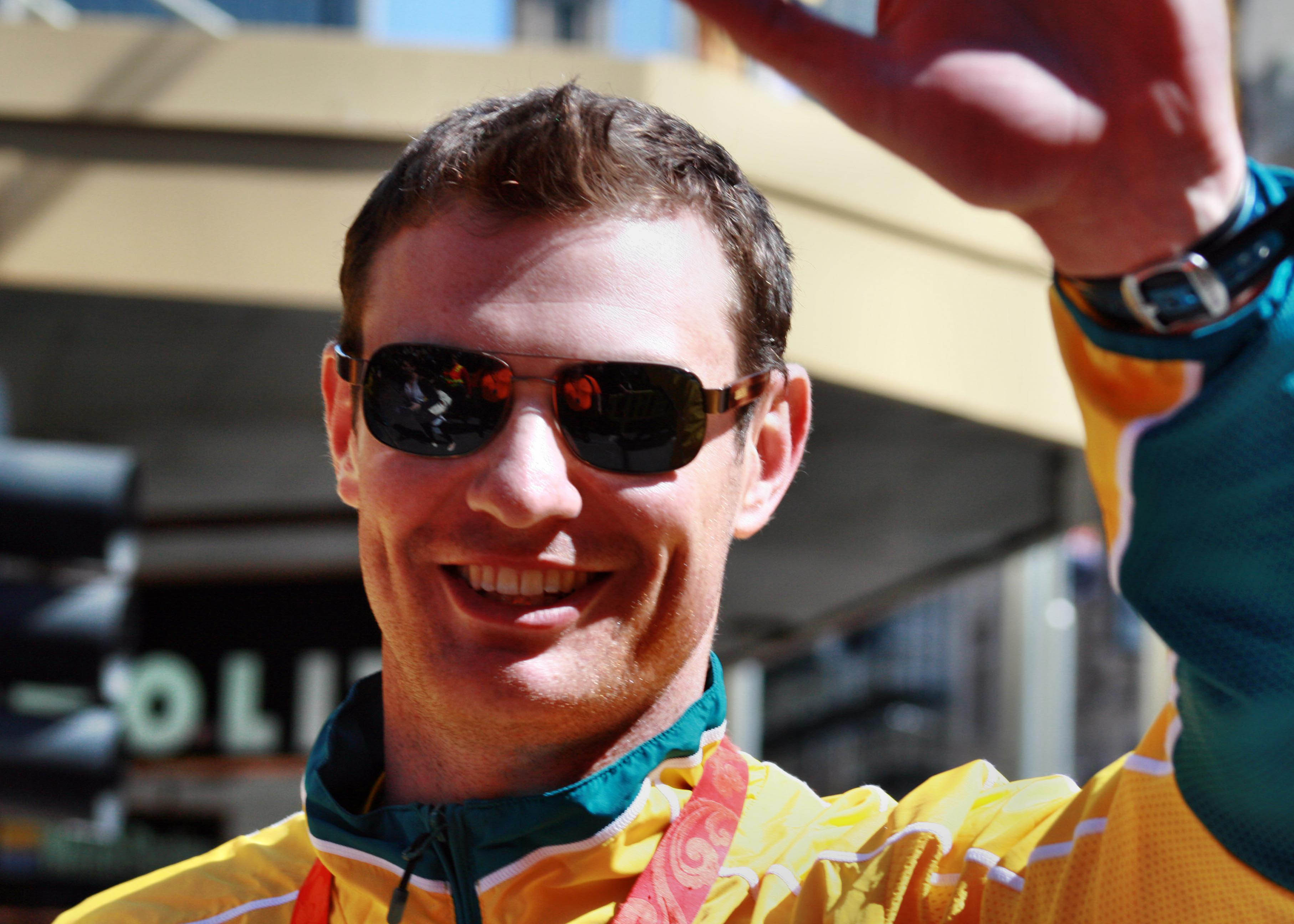

Personal information
- Nationality: Australian
- Born: 27 December 1982 (age 43) Terang, Victoria
- Education: University of Melbourne
- Occupation: Lawyer
- Height: 1.91 m (6 ft 3 in) (2008)
- Weight: 94 kg (207 lb) (2008)

Sport
- Country: Australia
- Sport: Rowing
- Event: Coxless four
- Club: Melbourne University Boat Club

Achievements and titles
- Olympic finals: 2008 Beijing Olympics & 2012 London Olympics
Medal record
Representing Australia
Olympic Games
Silver medal – second place	2008 Beijing	Coxless four
World Rowing Championships
Silver medal – second place	2009 Poznań	M4-
Bronze medal – third place	2010 Karapiro	M8+

James Marburg (born 27 December 1982) is an Australian retired rower. He is a dual Olympian, Olympic silver medallist and has represented Australia at five World Rowing Championships.

== Education ==
Marburg attended St Patrick's College, Ballarat. He undertook undergraduate studies at Royal Melbourne Institute of Technology and legal studies at University of Melbourne.

== Club and national rowing ==
Marburg's senior rowing was done from the Melbourne University Boat Club.

He was selected in the Victorian state representative eights who raced for the King's Cup at the Australian Rowing Championships on eight consecutive occasions from 2005 to 2012. Those Victorian crews saw King's Cup victories in 2006 and 2007. In 2006 he teamed up with Cameron McKenzie-McHarg to win the Australian national coxless pair championship beating out the fancied veteran duo of Drew Ginn and Duncan Free.

== International representative rowing ==
He gained selection in Australian VIIIs who competed at the 2006 and 2007 World Championships and considered that he was in contention for the Beijing Olympics.

In 2008 Marburg was selected in the men's coxless four, with Francis Hegerty, Matt Ryan and Cameron McKenzie-McHarg. The crew won their event at the 2008 World Rowing Cup I in Lucerne, Switzerland. The crew then turned their attention to the Olympic Qualification Regatta in Poznan. Ryan was struck down by illness and had to be replaced for the race by Terrence Alfred and the crew achieved qualification for the Olympic Games. In Beijing, the crew led for a large part of the race before placing second behind the race favourites from Great Britain to take the silver medal.

Marburg was selected in an unchanged men's coxless four for the 2009 World Rowing Championships in Poznan, Poland and won a silver medal. The following year he moved into the VIII which won bronze at the Lake Karapiro, New Zealand at the 2010 World Championships. In 2011 he was again selected into the VIII which placed fourth at the 2011 World Championships in Bled, Slovenia.

For the 2012 Summer Olympics, Marburg was selected into the men's pair with team-mate Brodie Buckland. The pair reached the final of the men's pair, placing fifth. Following the London games he retired from rowing.

== Professional career ==
Marburg began his legal career as a solicitor at King & Wood Mallesons Melbourne in 2014. Since 2020 he has been a senior associate at Clayton Utz Melbourne.

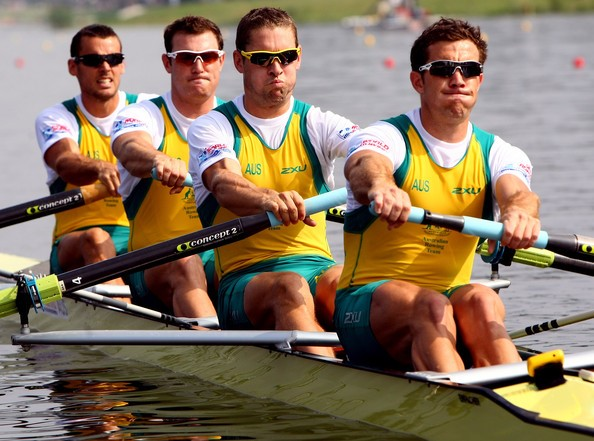
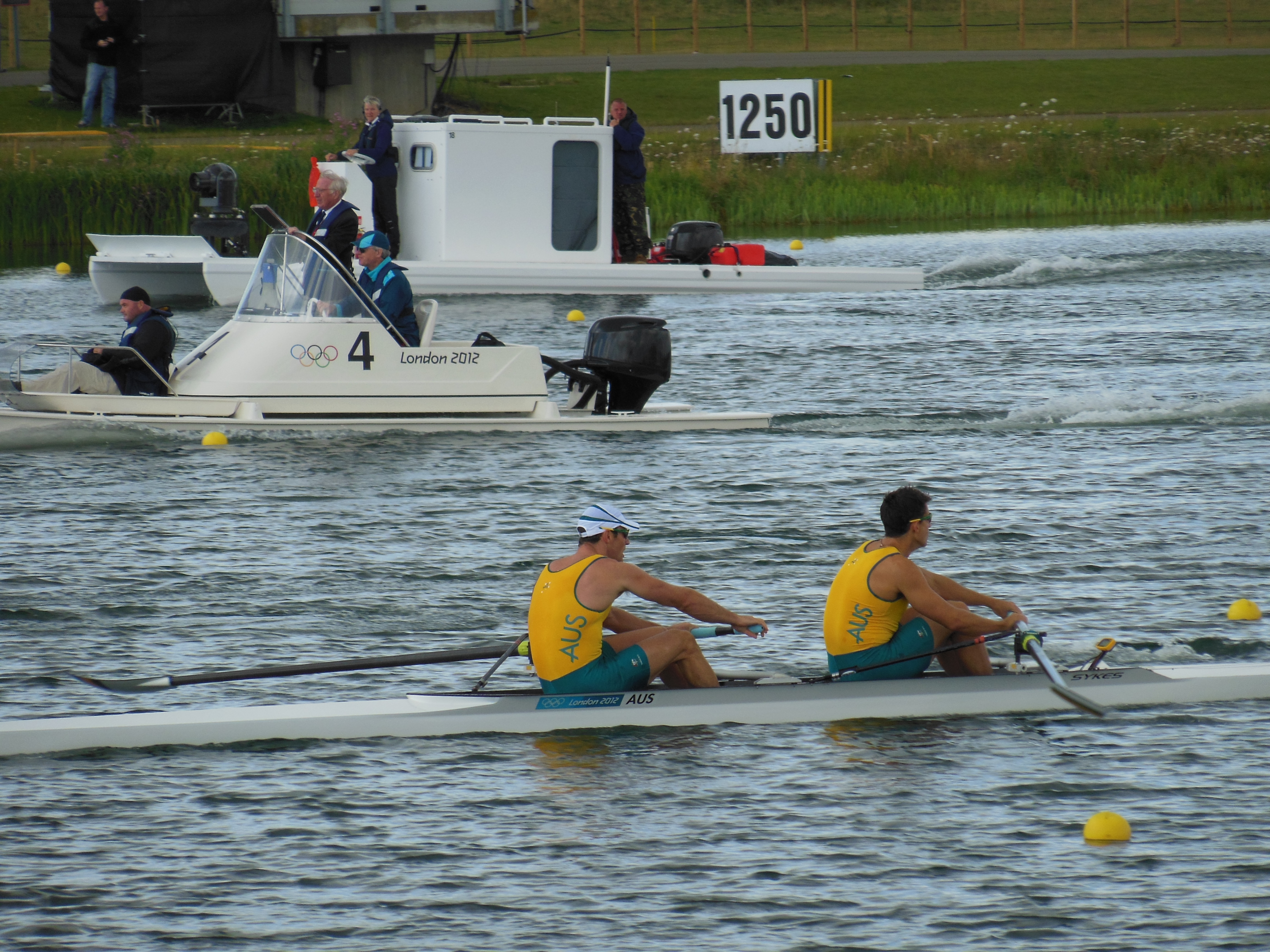
Marburg's Olympic crews : 2008 IV (l); 2012 pair in their final (r)
