= Benjamin Rondeau =

French rower (born 1983)

Medal record

Men's rowing

Representing France

Olympic Games
Bronze medal – third place	2008 Beijing	Coxless four

European Championships
Gold medal – first place	2008 Marathon	Eights
Bronze medal – third place	2009 Brest	Eights

Benjamin Rondeau (born 1 October 1983 in Verdun) is a French rower. He competed at the 2008 Summer Olympics, where he won a bronze medal in coxless four.
