= Milan Bruncvík =

Czech rower

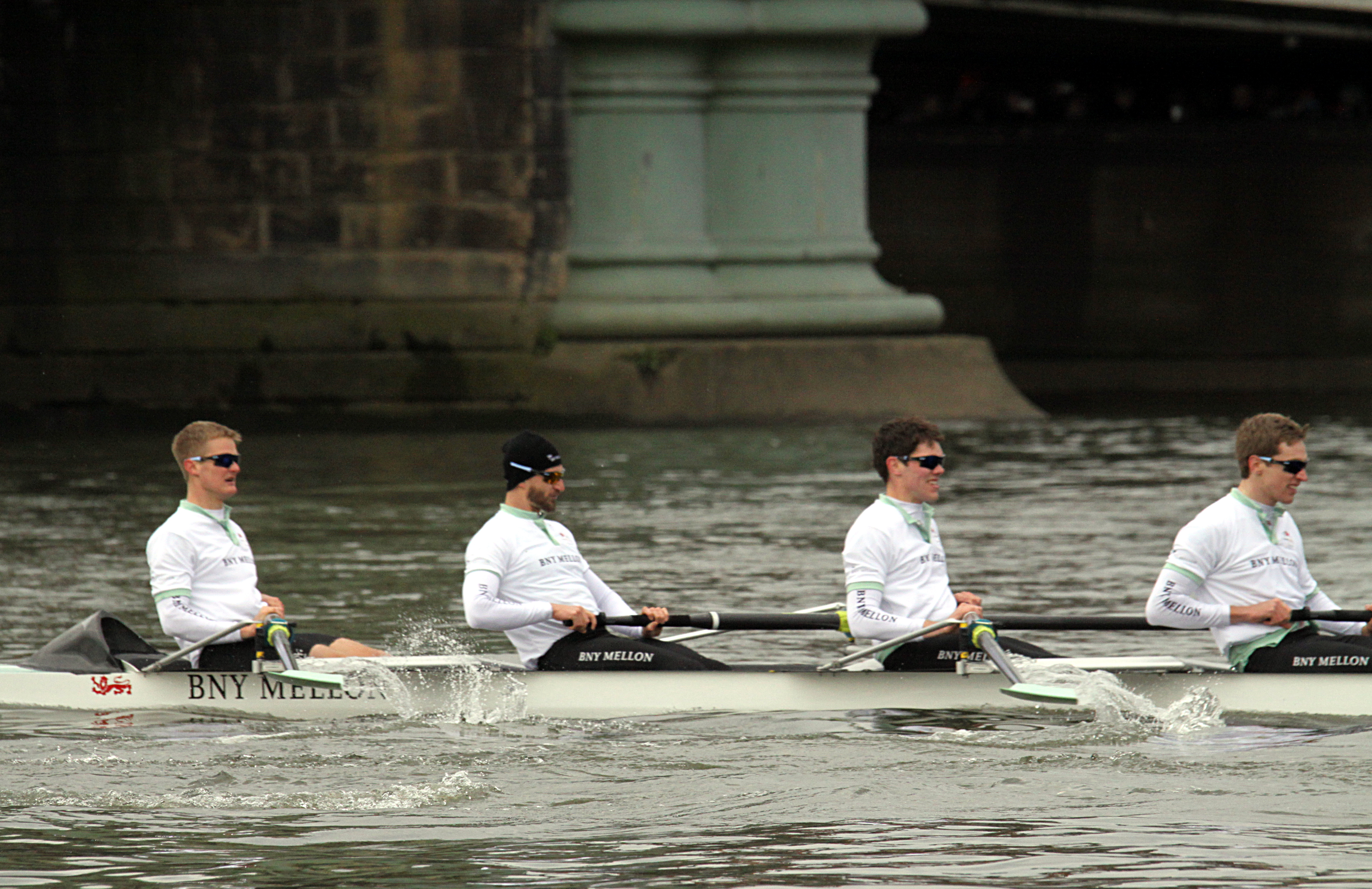
- Bruncvík (second from the left) during The Boat Race in 2013

Personal information
- Born: 21 June 1984 (age 42) Litoměřice
- Education: University of California Berkeley Czech Technical University in Prague University of Cambridge

Sport
- Sport: Rowing
Medal record
Men's rowing
Representing the Czech Republic
European Rowing Championships
Gold medal – first place	2007 Poznań	Coxless four
Bronze medal – third place	2010 Montemor-o-Velho	Coxless four

Milan Bruncvik (born 21 June 1984 in Litoměřice) is a Czech rower. He finished 5th in the men's coxless four at the 2008 Summer Olympics and 13th in the same event in 2012. He was the first Czech to participate in The Boat Race.
