= Dom Santamaria =

Dom Santamaria (born 5 December 1979, Melbourne, Australia) is the drummer from the Ballarat-based band Epicure.

== Biography ==
Santamaria began playing drums in 1992, as part of Epicure (band) between 1996 and 2010. Some major influences in his early years as a drummer were bands such as Ugly Kid Joe, Tool, Radiohead and Faith No More.

Santamaria has been involved in various side-projects including 'MC SANTA and the WACK ATTACK', "Strawberry Hick" and also filmed, edited and produced the underground documentary 'A Pygmy Tribe' which explored the Ballarat music scene in 2001.
