= David Banks (rower) =

American rower (born 1983)

Personal information
- Born: August 30, 1983 (age 42) Washington, District of Columbia, United States

Sport
- Sport: Rowing

David Banks (born August 30, 1983) is an American rower. He competed at the 2008 and 2012 Summer Olympics.
