= Yevgeny Nosov (rower) =

Belarusian rower

Personal information
- Nationality: Belarusian
- Born: 4 January 1983 (age 42); Gomel, Belarus

Sport
- Sport: Rowing

Yevgeny Nosov (born 4 January 1983) is a Belarusian rower. He competed in the men's coxless four event at the 2008 Summer Olympics.
