= Zhao Linquan =

Chinese rower (born 1987)

Zhao Linquan (born 1 April 1987) is a male Chinese rower. He competed for Team China at the 2008 Summer Olympics.
