= Juan Alban =

- Origin: Ballarat, Victoria, Australia
- Genres: Alternative rock
- Occupation(s): Singer, musician
- Instrument(s): Vocals, guitar
- Years active: 2004, 2010
- Member of: Epicure
- Website: www.epicuretheband.com

Juan Alban is a guitar player and the lead singer of Australian rock band Epicure. Alban currently resides in Ballarat, Victoria.
