= Romana Dubnová =

Czech high jumper

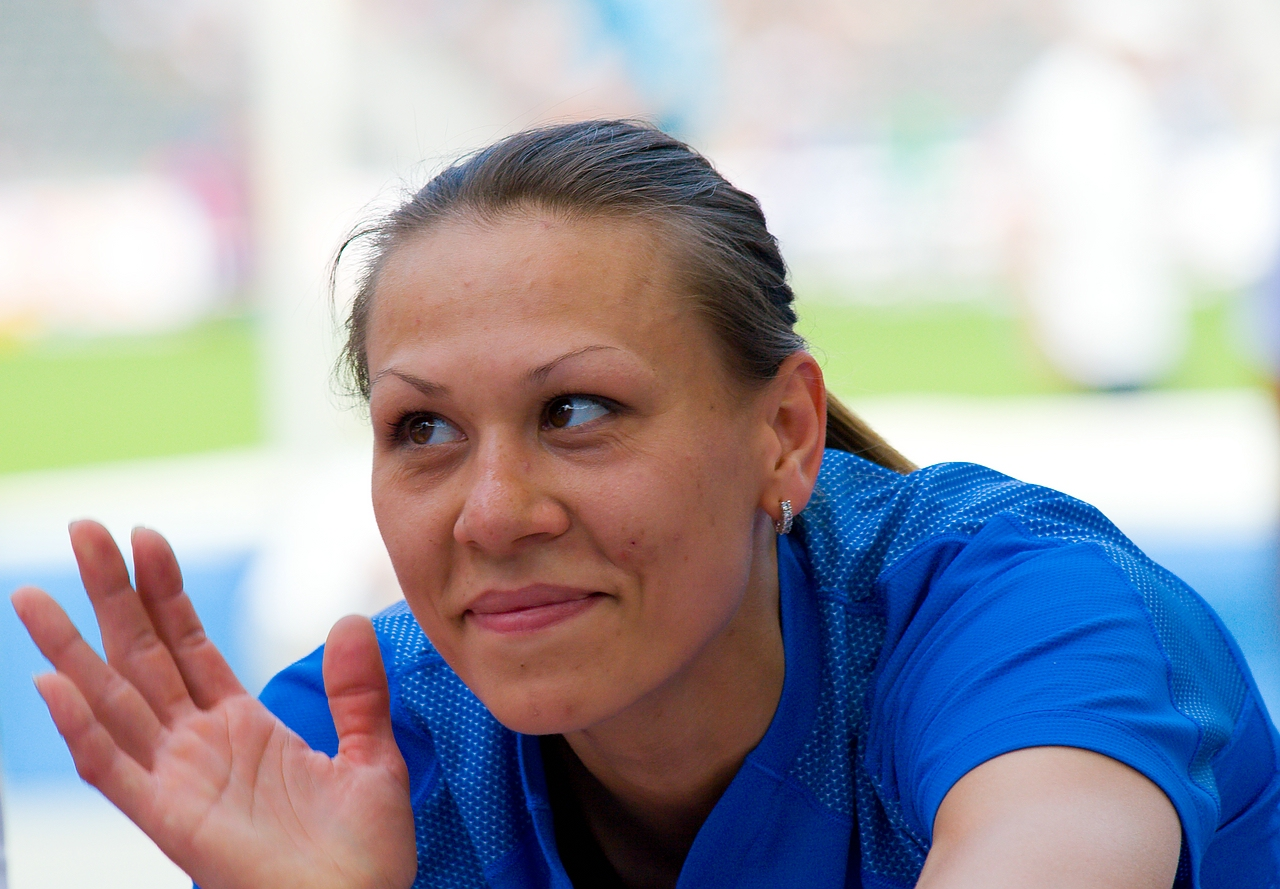
Dubnová at ISTAF 2008

Romana Dubnová (born 4 November 1978) is a Czech athlete high jumper. She competed at the 2008 Summer Olympics.

== Competition record ==
Year	Competition	Venue	Position	Notes
Representing Czech Republic
2006	European Championships	Gothenburg, Sweden	14th (q)	1.90 m
2007	European Indoor Championships	Birmingham, United Kingdom	9th (q)	1.87 m
2007	World Championships	Osaka, Japan	17th (q)	1.91 m
2008	Olympic Games	Beijing, China	12th	1.89 m
