= Michal Horváth (rower) =

Czech rower

Medal record

Men's rowing

Representing the Czech Republic

European Rowing Championships
Gold medal – first place	2007 Poznań	Coxless four
Bronze medal – third place	2010 Montemor-o-Velho	Coxless four
Bronze medal – third place	2012 Varese	Eight

Michal Horváth (Czech pronunciation: [ˈmɪxal ˈɦorvaːt]; born 30 June 1987 in Prague) is a Czech rower. He finished 5th in the men's coxless four at the 2008 Summer Olympics and 13th in the same event at the 2012 Summer Olympics.
