= Karel Neffe =

Czech rower (1948–2020)

Personal information
- Born: 6 July 1948 Prague
- Died: 13 February 2020 (aged 71)
- Height: 194 cm (6 ft 4 in)
- Weight: 92 kg (203 lb)
- Relatives: Karel Neffe Jr. (son)

Sport
- Sport: Rowing
Medal record
Representing Czechoslovakia
Men's rowing
Olympic Games
Bronze medal – third place	1972 Munich	Coxed four
World Championships
Bronze medal – third place	1977 Amsterdam	Coxed pair
European Rowing Championships
Bronze medal – third place	1973 Moscow	Coxed four

Karel Neffe (6 July 1948 – 13 February 2020) was a Czech rower who competed for Czechoslovakia in the 1972 Summer Olympics, in the 1976 Summer Olympics, and in the 1980 Summer Olympics.

He was born in Prague in 1948 and is the father of Karel Neffe Jr.

In 1972 he was a crew member of the Czechoslovak boat which won the bronze medal in the coxed fours event. Four years later he finished fourth with the Czechoslovak boat in the 1976 coxed fours competition. At the 1980 Games he was part of the Czechoslovak boat which finished fourth in the eight contest.
