= Song Kai (rower) =

Chinese rower

Song Kai (born 29 January 1984 in Chuzhou) is a male Chinese rower, who competed for Team China at the 2008 Summer Olympics.
