= Lenka Honzáková =

Czech trampoline gymnast

- Full name: Lenka Honzáková-Trojak
- Born: 16 April 1978 (age 48)

Gymnastics career
- Discipline: Trampoline gymnastics
- Country represented: Czech Republic

Lenka Popkin (née Honzáková; born 16 April 1978) is a Czech trampoline gymnast. She competed at the 2008 Summer Olympics.
