= Lorenzo Carboncini =

Italian rower (born 1976)

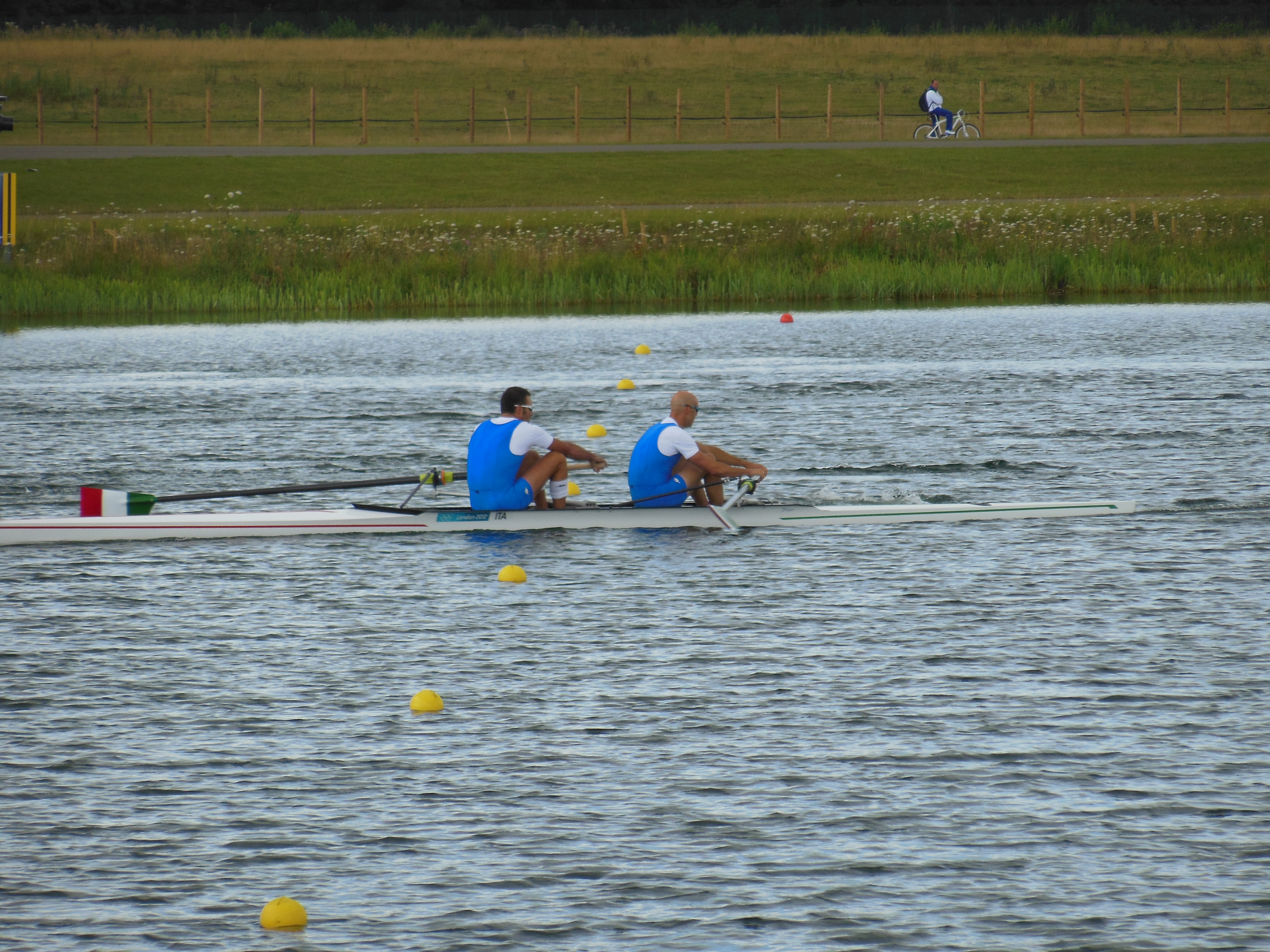
- Carboncini (on the right, the rower without hairs)

Personal information
- Nationality: Italian
- Born: 22 September 1976 (age 49) Rimini, Italy

Sport
- Sport: Rowing
- Club: Fiamme Oro
Medal record
Olympic Games
| Silver medal – second place | 2000 Sydney | Coxless four |
World Rowing Championships
| Gold medal – first place | 2004 Banyoles | M4+ |
| Silver medal – second place | 1997 Aiguebelette | M2- |
| Silver medal – second place | 2001 Lucerne | M2+ |
| Silver medal – second place | 2005 Gifu | M8+ |
| Silver medal – second place | 2006 Eton | M8+ |
| Silver medal – second place | 2007 Munich | M4- |
| Bronze medal – third place | 1995 Tampere | M4+ |
| Bronze medal – third place | 1998 Cologne | M4- |
| Bronze medal – third place | 1999 St. Catharines | M4- |
| Bronze medal – third place | 2002 Seville | M4- |
| Bronze medal – third place | 2011 Bled | M2- |

Lorenzo Carboncini (born 22 September 1976) is an Italian rower who has competed at four Olympic Games.

== Biography ==
His best result came at the 2000 Summer Olympics, where he won the silver medal as part of the Italian men's coxless four. Before that in 1996, he competed in the men's eight at the Olympics, finishing in 9th place. In 2008 he competed as part of the men's coxless four again, this time finishing in 11th. In 2012 he was part of the men's pair with Niccolo Mornati. They finished in fourth place.

He works as a police officer and enjoys basketball, golf and music.
