= Brett Newlin =

American rower

Medal record

Men's rowing

Representing United States

World Rowing Championships
Silver medal – second place	2005 Gifu	M4+

Brett Newlin (born March 24, 1982, in Mission Viejo, California) is an American rower, who competed at the 2008 and 2012 Summer Olympics. He grew up in Riverton, Wyoming and began college at Michigan State University, but transferred to the University of Washington in January 2003 as a sophomore and rowed in the UW V8+ that spring as the Huskies won their first Pac-10 Championship since 1997 and took silver at the IRA regatta. He repeated both results in 2004. He graduated from UW in 2005.

Newlin has been a member of eight USRowing national teams. World Rowing Championships results include silver in the 4+ (2005), fourth in the 4− (2006), fourth in the 8+ (2007), 13th in the 4− (2009), sixth in the 8+ (2010), and fourth in the 4− (2011). Olympic Games results include a ninth-place finish in the 4− (2008) and fourth in the 8+ (2012).

== Personal life ==
Newlin's sister is Kristen Newlin, who played professional women's basketball for Fenerbahçe Istanbul in Turkey.
