= Karel Neffe Jr. =

Czech rower

Personal information
- Born: 21 February 1985 (age 41) Prague, Czechoslovakia
- Parent: Karel Neffe (father)

Sport
- Sport: Rowing
Medal record
Men's rowing
Representing the Czech Republic
European Rowing Championships
| Gold medal – first place | 2007 Poznań | Coxless four |

Karel Neffe (born 21 February 1985) is a Czech rower. He finished 5th in the men's coxless four at the 2008 Summer Olympics. His father Karel Neffe was a crew member of the Czechoslovak boat which won the bronze medal in the 1972 coxed four event.

- World Rowing Junior Championships – 2002 champion in JM 8
- World Rowing Junior Championships – 2003 silver medalist in JM 4-
- World Rowing U23 Championships – 2006 champion in JMB 4- (world-best time)
- European Rowing Championships – 2007 champion in M4-
