= Tim Bignell =

Australian musician

Tim Bignell is an Australian bass guitarist from the Ballarat-based band Epicure.
