= Miha Pirih =

Slovenian rower (born 1978)

Miha Pirih (born March 10, 1978, in Jesenice) is a Slovenian rower who represented Slovenia at three consecutive Summer Olympics, starting in 2000.
