= Zhang Xingbo (rower) =

Chinese rower (born 1981)

Zhang Xingbo (born 13 April 1981) is a male Chinese rower. He competed for Team China at the 2008 Summer Olympics.
