= Cameron McKenzie-McHarg =

Australian rower (born 1980)

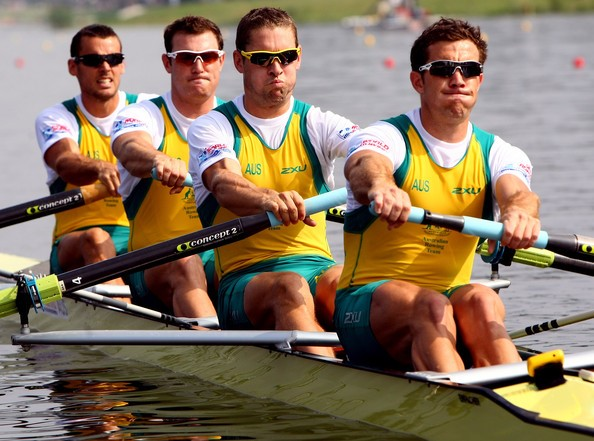
- From left to right: Matt Ryan, James Marburg, Cameron McKenzie-McHarg, and Francis Hegerty

Personal information
- Born: 17 April 1980 (age 46)

Sport
- Sport: Rowing
- Club: Melbourne University
Medal record
Olympic Games
Representing Australia
Silver medal – second place	2008 Beijing	Coxless four
World Rowing Championships
Silver medal – second place	2009 Poznań	M4-
Bronze medal – third place	2010 Karapiro	M8+

Cameron McKenzie-McHarg (born 17 April 1980 in Leongatha, Victoria) is an Australian former rower and Australian rules footballer. He is a dual Olympian who won a rowing silver medal at the 2008 Summer Olympics. He represented Australia at twelve world championships.

== Australian rules football ==
At the age of 18, he was drafted to the Western Bulldogs with pick 10 in the 1998 AFL pre-season draft. He spent 1999 in their reserves team but played no first grade games for the Bulldogs.

== Club and state rowing ==
McKenzie-McHarg took up rowing at Scotch College, Melbourne, seated at seven in their winning crew for the 1998 Head of the River (Victoria). Following his football foray he returned to rowing in 2005 from the Melbourne University Boat Club.

In 2006 he teamed up with James Marburg to win the Australian national coxless pair championship beating out the fancied veteran duo of Drew Ginn and Duncan Free. From 2001 to 2012 he was seated in Victorian senior men's VIIIs who raced for the King's Cup at the Australian Rowing Championships. Those crews won the blue riband event in 2001, 2002, 2003, 2006 and 2007.

== National representative rowing ==
He gained selection in Australian VIIIs who competed at the 2006 and 2007 World Championships and considered that he was in contention for the Beijing Olympics.

He made his Olympic debut in 2008 in Beijing, China. McKenzie-McHarg was selected in the coxless four alongside James Marburg and Sydney University boatmen Francis Hegerty and Matt Ryan. The crew won their event at the first world cup regatta in Lucerne, Switzerland. The four then turned their attention to the Olympic Qualification Regatta in Poznan. Ryan was struck down by illness and had to be replaced for the race by Terrence Alfred and the crew achieved qualification for the Olympic Games. In Beijing the crew led for a large part of the race before placing second behind the race favourites from Great Britain for a silver medal.

Following the 2008 Olympic year he continued to figure in contention for national selection and was picked in Australian crews for the next three world championships. At Poznan 2009 with his Olympic crewmates Marburg, Hegarty and Ryan, he again took silver behind Great Britain. The following year he moved into the VIII which won bronze at the Lake Karapiro, New Zealand At 2010 World Championships. At the 2011 World Championships in Bled, Slovenia, McKenzie-McHarg missed selection for the four and the Men's eight which both qualified for the London Olympic Games. However he maintained a spot in the senior squad rowing a coxless pair with Tom Larkins to 7th place.

For the 2012 Summer Olympics, McKenzie-McHarg regained his seat in the men's eight which finished sixth at Eton Dorney.
