= Rowing at the 2016 Summer Olympics – Qualification =

This article details the qualifying phase for rowing at the 2016 Summer Olympics. The majority of the spots were awarded based on the results at the 2015 World Rowing Championships, held at Lac d'Aiguebelette, France from August 30 to September 6, 2015. Places gained there were awarded to National Olympic Committees, not to specific athletes. Further berths are distributed to the nations at four continental qualifying regattas in Asia and Oceania, Africa, Latin America, and Europe (with the additional participation of the United States, Canada, Australia, and New Zealand), the latter being the final Olympic qualification regatta in Lucerne, Switzerland. In July 2016, four Russian crews were removed because of doping concerns, and FISA announced which NOCs would replace them.

== Summary ==
Nation	Men								Women						Crews	Athletes
Nation	M1x	M2-	M2x	M4-	M4x	M8+	LM2x	LM4-	W1x	W2-	W2x	W4x	W8+	LW2x	Crews	Athletes
Algeria	X								X						2	2
Angola							X								1	2
Argentina	X								X						2	2
Australia	X	X	X	X	X				X		X	X	X		9	29
Austria							X		X						2	3
Azerbaijan			X												1	2
Bahamas									X						1	1
Belarus	X			X					X	X	X				5	10
Belgium	X														1	1
Bermuda									X						1	1
Brazil							X							X	2	4
Bulgaria			X												1	2
Canada				X	X			X	X	X			X	X	7	26
Chile							X							X	2	4
China							X	X	X	X	X	X		X	7	17
Croatia	X		X												2	3
Cuba	X		X				X							X	4	7
Czech Republic	X	X						X	X		X				5	8
Denmark							X	X	X	X	X			X	6	12
Ecuador	X														1	1
Egypt	X								X						2	2
Estonia					X										1	4
France		X	X	X			X	X		X	X				7	18
Germany			X	X	X	X	X	X		X	X	X		X	10	35
Great Britain	X	X	X	X	X	X	X	X		X	X		X	X	12	43
Greece				X				X			X				3	10
Hong Kong							X							X	2	4
Hungary	X	X													2	3
India	X														1	1
Indonesia	X								X						2	2
Iran									X						1	1
Iraq	X														1	1
Ireland							X		X					X	3	5
Italy		X	X	X		X	X	X		X				X	8	27
Japan							X							X	2	4
Kazakhstan	X								X						2	2
Libya	X														1	1
Lithuania	X		X		X				X		X				5	10
Mexico	X								X						2	2
Netherlands		X		X		X		X		X		X	X	X	8	36
New Zealand	X	X	X		X	X		X	X	X	X		X	X	11	38
Nigeria									X						1	1
Norway	X		X				X								3	5
Paraguay	X								X						2	2
Peru	X								X						2	2
Poland	X				X	X	X			X	X	X		X	8	26
Romania		X		X						X			X	X	5	19
Russia				X											1	4
Serbia		X	X												2	4
Singapore									X						1	1
South Africa		X		X			X			X				X	5	12
South Korea	X								X						2	2
Spain		X								X					2	4
Sweden									X						1	1
Switzerland					X		X	X	X						4	11
Chinese Taipei									X						1	1
Thailand	X								X						2	2
Togo									X						1	1
Trinidad and Tobago									X						1	1
Tunisia	X													X	2	3
Turkey							X								1	2
Ukraine					X							X			2	8
United States		X		X		X	X	X	X	X	X	X	X	X	11	41
Uruguay	X														1	1
Uzbekistan	X														1	1
Vanuatu	X														1	1
Venezuela	X														1	1
Vietnam														X	1	2
Zimbabwe	X								X						2	2
Total: 69 NOCs	32	13	13	13	10	7	20	13	32	15	13	7	7	20	215	550

== Timeline ==
Event	Date	Venue
2015 World Rowing Championships	August 30 – September 6, 2015	(France) Lac d'Aiguebelette
African Continental Qualification Regatta	October 5–7, 2015	(Tunisia) Tunis
Latin America Continental Qualification Regatta	March 22–24, 2016	(Chile) Valparaíso
Asia & Oceania Continental Qualification Regatta	April 23–25, 2016	(South Korea) Chungju
European and Final Qualification Regatta	May 22–24, 2016	(Switzerland) Lucerne

== Men's events ==
=== Single sculls ===
Event	#	Nation	Qualified rower
2015 World Rowing Championships	1	Czech Republic	Ondřej Synek
2015 World Rowing Championships	2	New Zealand	Mahé Drysdale
2015 World Rowing Championships	3	Lithuania	Armandas Kelmelis
2015 World Rowing Championships	4	Norway	Nils Jakob Hoff
2015 World Rowing Championships	5	Croatia	Damir Martin
2015 World Rowing Championships	6	Cuba	Ángel Fournier
2015 World Rowing Championships	7	Belarus	Stanislau Shcharbachenia
2015 World Rowing Championships	8	Great Britain	Alan Campbell
2015 World Rowing Championships	9	Poland	Natan Węgrzycki-Szymczyk
Asia & Oceania Qualification Regatta	1	South Korea	Kim Dong-yong
Asia & Oceania Qualification Regatta	2	India	Dattu Baban Bhokanal
Asia & Oceania Qualification Regatta	3	Indonesia	Memo
Asia & Oceania Qualification Regatta	4	Thailand	Jaruwat Saensuk
Asia & Oceania Qualification Regatta	5	Kazakhstan	Vladislav Yakovlev
Asia & Oceania Qualification Regatta	6	Iraq	Mohammed Riyadh
Asia & Oceania Qualification Regatta	7	Uzbekistan	Shakhboz Kholmirzayev
African Qualification Regatta	1	Egypt	Abdelkhalek El-Banna
African Qualification Regatta	2	Tunisia	Mohamed Taieb
African Qualification Regatta	3	Algeria	Sid Ali Boudina
African Qualification Regatta	4	Zimbabwe	Andrew Peebles
Latin American Qualification Regatta	1	Mexico	Juan Carlos Cabrera
Latin American Qualification Regatta	2	Argentina	Brian Rosso
Latin American Qualification Regatta	3	Peru	Renzo Leon Garcia
Latin American Qualification Regatta	4	Uruguay	Jhonatan Esquivel
Latin American Qualification Regatta	5	Venezuela	Jakson Vicent Monasterio
Latin American Qualification Regatta	6	Ecuador	Bryan Sola Zambrano
Latin American Qualification Regatta	7	Paraguay	Arturo Rivarola
European Qualification Regatta	1	Belgium	Hannes Obreno
European Qualification Regatta	2	Australia	Rhys Grant
European Qualification Regatta	3	Hungary	Bendegúz Pétervári-Molnár
Tripartite Invitation	1	Libya	Al-Hussein Gambour
Tripartite Invitation	1	Vanuatu	Luigi Teilemb
Total	32		

Information updated after choices made by NOCs after Latin American qualification regatta.

=== Double sculls ===
Event	#	Nation	Qualified rowers
2015 World Rowing Championships	1	Croatia	Martin Sinković; Valent Sinković
2015 World Rowing Championships	2	Lithuania	Mindaugas Griškonis; Saulius Ritter
2015 World Rowing Championships	3	New Zealand	Chris Harris; Robbie Manson
2015 World Rowing Championships	4	Germany	Marcel Hacker; Stephan Krüger
2015 World Rowing Championships	5	Australia	Chris Morgan; David Watts
2015 World Rowing Championships	6	France	Matthieu Androdias; Hugo Boucheron
2015 World Rowing Championships	7	Azerbaijan	Aleksandar Aleksandrov; Boris Yotov
2015 World Rowing Championships	8	Great Britain	John Collins; Jonathan Walton
2015 World Rowing Championships	9	Cuba	Adrián Oquendo; Eduardo Rubio
2015 World Rowing Championships	10	Italy	Romano Battisti; Francesco Fossi
2015 World Rowing Championships	11	Bulgaria	Georgi Bozhilov; Kristian Vasilev
Final Olympic Qualification Regatta	1	Norway	Kjetil Borch; Olaf Tufte
Final Olympic Qualification Regatta	2	Serbia	Marko Marjanovic; Andrija Sljukic
Total	13		

=== Lightweight double sculls ===
Event	#	Nation	Qualified rowers
2015 World Rowing Championships	1	France	Jérémie Azou; Pierre Houin
2015 World Rowing Championships	2	Great Britain	Richard Chambers; Will Fletcher
2015 World Rowing Championships	3	Norway	Kristoffer Brun; Are Strandli
2015 World Rowing Championships	4	South Africa	John Smith; James Thompson
2015 World Rowing Championships	5	Italy	Marcello Miani; Andrea Micheletti
2015 World Rowing Championships	6	Germany	Moritz Moos; Jason Osborne
2015 World Rowing Championships	7	Poland	Miłosz Jankowski; Artur Mikołajczewski
2015 World Rowing Championships	8	United States	Andrew Campbell; Joshua Konieczny
2015 World Rowing Championships	9	Austria	Bernhard Sieber; Paul Sieber
2015 World Rowing Championships	10	Switzerland	Michael Schmid; Daniel Wiederkehr
2015 World Rowing Championships	11	Ireland	Paul O'Donovan; Gary O'Donovan
Asia & Oceania Qualification Regatta	1	China	Sun Man; Wang Chunxin
Asia & Oceania Qualification Regatta	2	Japan	Hiroshi Nakano; Hideki Omoto
Asia & Oceania Qualification Regatta	3	Hong Kong	Chiu Hin Chun; Tang Chiu Mang
African Qualification Regatta	1	Angola+	André Matias; Jean-Luc Rasamoelina
Latin American Qualification Regatta	1	Brazil	William Giaretton; Xavier Vela
Latin American Qualification Regatta	2	Cuba	Raúl Hernández; Liosbel Hernández
Latin American Qualification Regatta	3	Chile	Felipe Cárdenas; Bernardo Guerrero
European Qualification Regatta	1	Turkey	Hüseyin Kandemir; Enes Kuşku
European Qualification Regatta	2	Denmark	Mads Rasmussen; Rasmus Quist Hansen
Total	20		

+ EGY won LM2x and M1x at Continental Qualification Regatta, but NOC had to decide which boat to confirm for the Games due to the one-boat quota rule on each gender at the Continental Qualification Regatta. EGY chose M1x, hence LM2x place went to ANG.

Information updated after choices made by NOCs after Latin American qualification regatta.

BEL chose M1x after European Qual Regatta, hence LM2x place went to DEN.

=== Quadruple sculls ===
Event	#	Nation	Qualified rowers
2015 World Rowing Championships	1	Germany	Hans Gruhne; Lauritz Schoof; Karl Schulz; Philipp Wende
2015 World Rowing Championships	2	Australia	Alexander Belonogoff; Karsten Forsterling; Cameron Girdlestone; James McRae
2015 World Rowing Championships	3	Estonia	Tõnu Endrekson; Andrei Jämsä; Allar Raja; Kaspar Taimsoo
2015 World Rowing Championships	4	Great Britain	Angus Groom; Peter Lambert; Sam Townsend; Graeme Thomas
2015 World Rowing Championships	5	Switzerland	Barnabé Delarze; Augustin Maillefer; Roman Röösli; Nico Stahlberg
2015 World Rowing Championships	6	Lithuania	Aurimas Adomavičius; Martynas Džiaugys; Dominykas Jančionis; Dovydas Nemeravičius
2015 World Rowing Championships	7	Poland	Mateusz Biskup; Wiktor Chabel; Dariusz Radosz; Mirosław Ziętarski
2015 World Rowing Championships	8	Ukraine	Dmytro Mikhay; Artem Morozov; Oleksandr Nadtoka; Ivan Dovhodko
Final Olympic Qualification Regatta	—	~~Russia~~	~~Nikita Morgachyov~~; ~~Artyom Kosov~~; ~~Vladislav Ryabtsev~~; ~~Sergey Fedorovtsev~~ *
Final Olympic Qualification Regatta	1	Canada	Julien Bahain; Robert Gibson; Will Dean; Pascal Lussier
Final Olympic Qualification Regatta	2	New Zealand	George Bridgewater; Nathan Flannery; John Storey; Jade Uru
Total	10		

- Russia were disqualified on 1 July 2016 following the nullification of all results following a failure in an anti-doping test by Sergey Fedorovtsev. Their quota place was transferred to New Zealand.

=== Pair ===
Event	#	Nation	Qualified rowers
2015 World Rowing Championships	1	New Zealand	Hamish Bond; Eric Murray
2015 World Rowing Championships	2	Great Britain	Stewart Innes; Alan Sinclair
2015 World Rowing Championships	3	Serbia	Nenad Beđik; Miloš Vasić
2015 World Rowing Championships	4	Netherlands	Roel Braas; Mitchel Steenman
2015 World Rowing Championships	5	Italy	Giovanni Abagnale; Vincenzo Capelli
2015 World Rowing Championships	6	Australia	Alexander Lloyd; Spencer Turrin
2015 World Rowing Championships	7	South Africa	Lawrence Brittain; Shaun Keeling
2015 World Rowing Championships	8	France	Germain Chardin; Dorian Mortelette
2015 World Rowing Championships	9	United States	Nareg Guregian; Anders Weiss
2015 World Rowing Championships	10	Spain	Alex Sigurbjornsson; Pau Vela
2015 World Rowing Championships	11	Romania	Cristi-Ilie Pârghie; George Alexandru Pălămariu
Final Olympic Qualification Regatta	1	Czech Republic	Jakub Podrazil; Lukáš Helešic
Final Olympic Qualification Regatta	2	Hungary	Béla Simon; Adrián Juhász
Total	13		

=== Four ===
Event	#	Nation	Qualified rowers
2015 World Rowing Championships	1	Italy	Marco Di Costanzo; Matteo Lodo; Domenico Montrone; Giuseppe Vicino
2015 World Rowing Championships	2	Australia	Josh Booth; Josh Dunkley-Smith; Alexander Hill; William Lockwood
2015 World Rowing Championships	3	Great Britain	Alex Gregory; Constantine Louloudis; George Nash; Moe Sbihi
2015 World Rowing Championships	4	Canada	Will Crothers; Kai Langerfeld; Conlin McCabe; Tim Schrijver
2015 World Rowing Championships	5	Germany	Anton Braun; Maximilian Korge; Max Planer; Felix Wimberger
2015 World Rowing Championships	6	Netherlands	Harold Langen; Peter van Schie; Govert Viergever; Vincent van der Want
2015 World Rowing Championships	7	United States	Charlie Cole; Henrik Rummel; Matt Miller; Seth Weil
2015 World Rowing Championships	8	Belarus	Vadzim Lialin; Dzianis Mihal; Mikalai Sharlap; Ihar Pashevich
2015 World Rowing Championships	9	Greece	Dionisis Angelopoulos; Ioannis Christou; Ioannis Tsilis; Georgios Tziallas
2015 World Rowing Championships	10	Russia	Anton Zarutskiy; Artyom Kosov; Vladislav Ryabtsev; Nikita Morgachyov
2015 World Rowing Championships	11	Romania	Vlad-Dragos Aicoboae; Constantin Adam; Marius Cozmiuc; Toader-Andrei Gontaru
Final Olympic Qualification Regatta	1	South Africa	David Hunt; Jonty Smith; Vincent Breet; Jake Green
Final Olympic Qualification Regatta	2	France	Benjamin Lang; Mickaël Marteau; Théophile Onfroy; Valentin Onfroy
Total	13		

=== Lightweight four ===
Event	#	Nation	Qualified rowers
2015 World Rowing Championships	1	Switzerland	Mario Gyr; Simon Niepmann; Simon Schürch; Lucas Tramèr
2015 World Rowing Championships	2	Denmark	Jacob Barsøe; Morten Jørgensen; Kasper Winther Jørgensen; Jacob Larsen
2015 World Rowing Championships	3	France	Thomas Baroukh; Thibault Colard; Guillaume Raineau; Franck Solforosi
2015 World Rowing Championships	4	New Zealand	Alistair Bond; James Hunter; James Lassche; Peter Taylor
2015 World Rowing Championships	5	Netherlands	Björn van den Ende; Jort van Gennep; Tim Heijbrock; Joris Pijs
2015 World Rowing Championships	6	Italy	Martino Goretti; Livio La Padula; Stefano Oppo; Pietro Ruta
2015 World Rowing Championships	7	United States	Anthony Fahden; Edward King; Tyler Nase; Robin Prendes
2015 World Rowing Championships	8	China	Jin Wei; Zhao Jingbin; Yu Chenggang; Wang Tiexin
2015 World Rowing Championships	9	Great Britain	Mark Aldred; Chris Bartley; Peter Chambers; Jono Clegg
2015 World Rowing Championships	10	Czech Republic	Jiří Kopáč; Jan Vetešník; Ondřej Vetešník; Miroslav Vraštil Jr.
2015 World Rowing Championships	11	Canada	Brendan Hodge; Maxwell Lattimer; Nicolas Pratt; Eric Woelfl
Final Olympic Qualification Regatta	~~1~~	~~Russia~~	
Final Olympic Qualification Regatta	1	Germany	Tobias Franzmann; Jonathan Koch; Lucas Schäfer; Lars Wichert
Final Olympic Qualification Regatta	2	Greece	Spyridon Giannaros; Panagiotis Magdanis; Stefanos Ntouskos; Ioannis Petrou
Total	13		

=== Eight ===
Event	#	Nation	Qualified rowers
2015 World Rowing Championships	1	Great Britain	Paul Bennett; Scott Durant; Matt Gotrel; Matt Langridge; Tom Ransley; Pete Reed; Will Satch; Andrew Triggs Hodge; Phelan Hill (cox)
2015 World Rowing Championships	2	Germany	Felix Drahotta; Malte Jakschik; Eric Johannesen; Andreas Kuffner; Maximilian Munski; Hannes Ocik; Maximilian Reinelt; Richard Schmidt; Martin Sauer (cox)
2015 World Rowing Championships	3	Netherlands	Kaj Hendriks; Robert Lücken; Boaz Meylink; Boudewijn Röell; Olivier Siegelaar; Dirk Uittenbogaard; Mechiel Versluis; Tone Wieten; Peter Wiersum (cox)
2015 World Rowing Championships	4	New Zealand	Michael Brake; Isaac Grainger; Stephen Jones; Alex Kennedy; Shaun Kirkham; Tom Murray; Brook Robertson; Joe Wright; Caleb Shepherd (cox)
2015 World Rowing Championships	~~5~~	~~Russia~~	
Final Olympic Qualification Regatta	1	United States	Mike DiSanto; Sam Dommer; Austin Hack; Alex Karwoski; Stephen Kasprzyk; Rob Munn; Glenn Ochal; Hans Struzyna; Sam Ojserkis (cox)
Final Olympic Qualification Regatta	2	Poland	Zbigniew Schodowski; Mateusz Wilangowski; Marcin Brzeziński; Robert Fuchs; Krystian Aranowski; Michał Szpakowski; Mikołaj Burda; Piotr Juszczak; Daniel Trojanowski (cox)
Final Olympic Qualification Regatta	3	Italy	Luca Agamennoni; Vincenzo Capelli; Pierpaolo Frattini; Fabio Infimo; Emanuele Liuzzi; Mario Paonessa; Matteo Stefanini; Simone Venier; Enrico D’Aniello (cox)
Total	7		

== Women's events ==
=== Single sculls ===
Event	#	Nation	Qualified rower
2015 World Rowing Championships	1	Australia	Kim Brennan
2015 World Rowing Championships	2	Czech Republic	Miroslava Knapková
2015 World Rowing Championships	3	China	Duan Jingli
2015 World Rowing Championships	4	United States	Genevra Stone
2015 World Rowing Championships	5	Switzerland	Jeannine Gmelin
2015 World Rowing Championships	6	Canada	Carling Zeeman
2015 World Rowing Championships	7	Sweden	Anna Malvina Svennung
2015 World Rowing Championships	8	Lithuania	Lina Šaltytė
2015 World Rowing Championships	9	Austria	Magdalena Lobnig
Asia & Oceania Qualification Regatta	1	South Korea	Kim Ye-ji
Asia & Oceania Qualification Regatta	2	Iran	Mahsa Javar
Asia & Oceania Qualification Regatta	3	Chinese Taipei	Huang Yi-ting
Asia & Oceania Qualification Regatta	4	Kazakhstan	Svetlana Germanovich
Asia & Oceania Qualification Regatta	5	Indonesia	Dewi Yuliawati
Asia & Oceania Qualification Regatta	6	Singapore	Saiyidah Aisyah
Asia & Oceania Qualification Regatta	7	Thailand	Phuttharaksa Neegree
African Qualification Regatta	1	Zimbabwe	Micheen Thornycroft
African Qualification Regatta	2	Algeria	Amina Rouba
African Qualification Regatta	3	Nigeria	Chierika Ukogu
African Qualification Regatta	4	Egypt	Heba Ahmed
Latin American Qualification Regatta	1	Bermuda	Michelle Pearson
Latin American Qualification Regatta	2	Mexico	Kenia Lechuga
Latin American Qualification Regatta	3	Trinidad and Tobago	Felice Chow
Latin American Qualification Regatta	4	Argentina	Lucia Palermo
Latin American Qualification Regatta	5	Paraguay	Gabriela Mosqueira
Latin American Qualification Regatta	6	Peru	Camila Valle
Latin American Qualification Regatta	7	Bahamas	Emily Morley
European & Final Olympic Qualification Regatta	1	New Zealand	Emma Twigg
European & Final Olympic Qualification Regatta	2	Ireland	Sanita Pušpure
European & Final Olympic Qualification Regatta	3	Belarus	Ekaterina Karsten
European & Final Olympic Qualification Regatta	4	Denmark	Fie Udby Erichsen
Tripartite Invitation	—N/a	Togo	Claire Akossiwa
Total	32		

Information updated after choices made by NOCs after Latin American qualification regatta.

=== Double sculls ===
Event	#	Nation	Qualified rowers
2015 World Rowing Championships	1	New Zealand	Eve Macfarlane; Zoe Stevenson
2015 World Rowing Championships	2	Greece	Sofia Asoumanaki; Aikaterini Nikolaidou
2015 World Rowing Championships	3	Germany	Mareike Adams; Marie-Cathérine Arnold
2015 World Rowing Championships	4	Poland	Magdalena Fularczyk; Natalia Madaj
2015 World Rowing Championships	5	Lithuania	Milda Valčiukaitė; Donata Vištartaitė
2015 World Rowing Championships	6	Great Britain	Katherine Grainger; Victoria Thornley
2015 World Rowing Championships	7	China	Lü Yang; Zhu Weiwei
2015 World Rowing Championships	8	France	Hélène Lefebvre; Elodie Ravera
2015 World Rowing Championships	9	Belarus	Yuliya Bichyk; Tatsiana Kukhta
2015 World Rowing Championships	10	Australia	Genevieve Horton; Sally Kehoe
2015 World Rowing Championships	11	United States	Meghan O'Leary; Ellen Tomek
Final Olympic Qualification Regatta	1	Czech Republic	Lenka Antošová; Kristýna Fleissnerová
Final Olympic Qualification Regatta	2	Denmark	Lisbet Jakobsen; Nina Hollensen
Total	13		

=== Lightweight double sculls ===
Event	#	Nation	Qualified rowers
2015 World Rowing Championships	1	New Zealand	Julia Edward; Sophie MacKenzie
2015 World Rowing Championships	2	Great Britain	Katherine Copeland; Charlotte Taylor
2015 World Rowing Championships	3	South Africa	Ursula Grobler; Kirsten McCann
2015 World Rowing Championships	4	Canada	Lindsay Jennerich; Patricia Obee
2015 World Rowing Championships	5	Denmark	Anne Lolk Thomsen; Juliane Rasmussen
2015 World Rowing Championships	6	Germany	Marie-Louise Dräger; Fini Sturm
2015 World Rowing Championships	7	China	Huang Wenyi; Pan Feihong
2015 World Rowing Championships	8	Poland	Weronika Deresz; Martyna Mikolajczak
2015 World Rowing Championships	9	Ireland	Sinéad Jennings; Claire Lambe
2015 World Rowing Championships		~~Russia~~	
2015 World Rowing Championships	10	United States	Kate Bertko; Devery Karz
Asia & Oceania Qualification Regatta	1	Japan	Ayami Oishi; Chiaki Tomita
Asia & Oceania Qualification Regatta	2	Vietnam	Tạ Thanh Huyền; Hồ Thị Lý
Asia & Oceania Qualification Regatta	3	Hong Kong	Lee Yuen Yin; Lee Ka Man
African Qualification Regatta	1	Tunisia	Nour El-Houda Ettaieb; Khadija Krimi
Latin American Qualification Regatta	1	Brazil	Fernanda Nunes; Vanessa Cozzi
Latin American Qualification Regatta	2	Cuba	Yislena Hernandez; Licet Hernandez
Latin American Qualification Regatta	3	Chile	Melita Abraham; Josefa Vila
European Qualification Regatta	1	Netherlands	Ilse Paulis; Maaike Head
European Qualification Regatta	2	Romania	Gianina-Elena Beleaga; Ionela-Livia Lehaci
European Qualification Regatta	3	Italy	Laura Milani; Valentina Rodini
Total	20		

=== Quadruple sculls ===
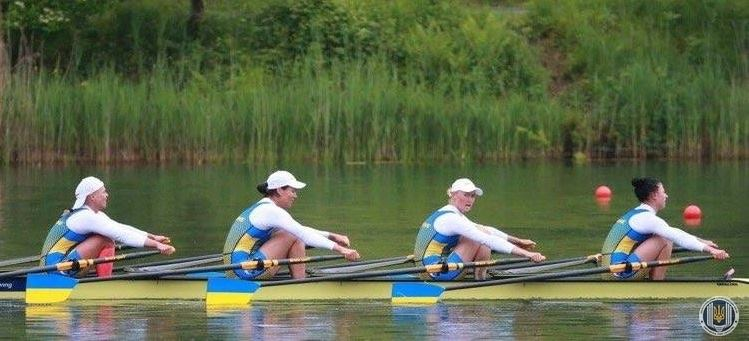
Ukrainian quad sculls at the 2016 Final Olympic Qualification Regatta

Event	#	Nation	Qualified rowers
2015 World Rowing Championships	1	United States	Tracy Eisser; Megan Kalmoe; Grace Latz; Adrienne Martelli
2015 World Rowing Championships	2	Germany	Carina Bär; Julia Lier; Lisa Schmidla; Annekatrin Thiele
2015 World Rowing Championships	3	Netherlands	Chantal Achterberg; Nicole Beukers; Carline Bouw; Inge Janssen
2015 World Rowing Championships	4	Poland	Monika Ciaciuch; Maria Springwald; Joanna Leszczyńska; Agnieszka Kobus
2015 World Rowing Championships	5	Australia	Jennifer Cleary; Madeleine Edmunds; Jessica Hall; Kerry Hore
Final Olympic Qualification Regatta	1	China	Zhang Ling; Jiang Yan; Wang Yuwei; Zhang Xinyue
Final Olympic Qualification Regatta	2	Ukraine	Daryna Verkhohliad; Olena Buryak; Anastasiya Kozhenkova; Ievgeniia Nimchenko
Total	7		

=== Pair ===
Event	#	Nation	Qualified rowers
2015 World Rowing Championships	1	Great Britain	Helen Glover; Heather Stanning
2015 World Rowing Championships	2	New Zealand	Genevieve Behrent; Rebecca Scown
2015 World Rowing Championships	3	United States	Grace Luczak; Felice Mueller
2015 World Rowing Championships	4	Denmark	Anne Dsane Andersen; Lærke Rasmussen
2015 World Rowing Championships	5	South Africa	Lee-Ann Persse; Kate Christowitz
2015 World Rowing Championships	6	Canada	Jennifer Martins; Nicole Hare
2015 World Rowing Championships	7	Romania	Cristina Grigoraș; Laura Oprea
2015 World Rowing Championships	8	Germany	Kerstin Hartmann; Kathrin Marchand
2015 World Rowing Championships	9	France	Noémie Kober; Marie Le Nepvou
2015 World Rowing Championships	10	Belarus	Alena Furman; Ina Nikulina
2015 World Rowing Championships	11	Netherlands	Aletta Jorritsma; Karien Robbers
Final Olympic Qualification Regatta	1	Spain	Anna Boada; Aina Cid
Final Olympic Qualification Regatta	2	China	Zhang Min; Miao Tian
Final Olympic Qualification Regatta	3	Italy	Alessandra Patelli; Sara Bertolasi
Final Olympic Qualification Regatta	4	Poland	Anna Wierzbowska; Maria Wierzbowska
Total	15		

=== Eight ===
Event	#	Nation	Qualified rowers
2015 World Rowing Championships	1	United States	Amanda Elmore; Tessa Gobbo; Elle Logan; Meghan Musnicki; Amanda Polk; Emily Regan; Lauren Schmetterling; Kerry Simmonds; Katelin Snyder (cox)
2015 World Rowing Championships	2	New Zealand	Genevieve Behrent; Kelsey Bevan; Emma Dyke; Kerri Gowler; Grace Prendergast; Kayla Pratt; Rebecca Scown; Ruby Tew; Francie Turner (cox)
2015 World Rowing Championships	3	Canada	Ashley Brzozowicz; Susanne Grainger; Jennifer Martins; Natalie Mastracci; Cristy Nurse; Lisa Roman; Christine Roper; Lauren Wilkinson; Lesley Thompson (cox)
2015 World Rowing Championships	4	Great Britain	Karen Bennett; Olivia Carnegie-Brown; Jessica Eddie; Katie Greves; Frances Houghton; Zoe Lee; Polly Swann; Melanie Wilson; Zoe de Toledo (cox)
2015 World Rowing Championships	~~5~~	~~Russia~~	
Final Olympic Qualification Regatta	1	Romania	Mădălina Bereș; Andreea Boghian; Adelina Bogus; Roxana Cogianu; Irina Dorneanu; Laura Oprea; Mihaela Petrilă; Ioana Strungaru; Daniela Druncea (cox)
Final Olympic Qualification Regatta	2	Netherlands	Wianka van Dorp; Sophie Souwer; Lies Rustenburg; José van Veen; Ellen Hogerwerf; Claudia Belderbos; Monica Lanz; Olivia van Rooijen; Ae-Ri Noort (cox)
Final Olympic Qualification Regatta	3	Australia	Fiona Albert; Olympia Aldersey; Molly Goodman; Alexandra Hagan; Jessica Morrison; Lucy Stephan; Charlotte Sutherland; Meaghan Volker; Sarah Banting (cox)
Total	7		
