= 2017 World Rowing Championships – Men's coxless four =

Men's coxless four at the 2017 World Rowing Championships
- Venue: Nathan Benderson Park
- Location: Sarasota, United States
- Dates: 24–30 September
- Competitors: 61 from 15 nations
- Winning time: 5:55.24

Medalists
gold medal	Joshua Hicks; Spencer Turrin; Jack Hargreaves; Alexander Hill	Australia
silver medal	Marco Di Costanzo; Giovanni Abagnale; Matteo Castaldo; Domenico Montrone	Italy
bronze medal	Matthew Rossiter; Moe Sbihi; Matthew Tarrant; Will Satch	Great Britain

The men's coxless four competition at the 2017 World Rowing Championships in Sarasota took place in Nathan Benderson Park.

== Schedule ==
The schedule was as follows:

Date	Time	Round
Sunday 24 September 2017	12:11	Heats
Tuesday 26 September 2017	13:10	Repechage
Thursday 28 September 2017	11:11	Semifinals A/B
Friday 29 September 2017	14:05	Final C
Saturday 30 September 2017	09:20	Final B
Saturday 30 September 2017	11:23	Final A

All times are Eastern Daylight Time (UTC−4)

== Results ==
=== Heats ===
The three fastest boats in each heat advanced directly to the A/B semifinals. The remaining boats were sent to the repechage.

==== Heat 1 ====
Rank	Rowers	Country	Time	Notes
1	Matthew Rossiter; Moe Sbihi; Matthew Tarrant; Will Satch	Great Britain	6:00.18	SA/B
2	Wolf-Niclas Schröder; Laurits Follert; Christopher Reinhardt; Paul Gebauer	Germany	6:04.68	SA/B
3	Gabriel Hohensasser; Christoph Seifriedberger; Rudolph Querfeld; Ferdinand Querfeld	Austria	6:05.73	SA/B
4	David Hunt; Lawrence Brittain; John Smith; Jake Green	South Africa	6:10.45	R
5	Julien Montet; Benoît Brunet; Benoit Demey; Edouard Jonville	France	6:11.21	R

==== Heat 2 ====
Rank	Rowers	Country	Time	Notes
1	Joshua Hicks; Spencer Turrin; Jack Hargreaves; Alexander Hill	Australia	6:06.71	SA/B
2	Jon Carazo; Ismael Montes; Jaime Canalejo; Javier Garcia	Spain	6:08.44	SA/B
3	Alex Kennedy; Cameron Webster; Charles Rogerson; Anthony Allen	New Zealand	6:13.72	SA/B
4	Povilas Stankunas; Saulius Ilonis; Bieliauskas Giedrius; Dominykas Jančionis	Lithuania	6:20.03	R
5	Joaquin Iwan; Ignacio González; Nicolas Silvestro; Ariel Suárez	Argentina	6:26.54	R

==== Heat 3 ====
Rank	Rowers	Country	Time	Notes
1	Marco Di Costanzo; Giovanni Abagnale; Matteo Castaldo; Domenico Montrone	Italy	5:58.27	SA/B
2	Toger Rasmussen; Steffen Jensen; Tobias Kempf; Joachim Sutton	Denmark	5:59.79	SA/B
3	Harold Langen; Jasper Tissen; Vincent van der Want; Govert Viergever	Netherlands	6:00.05	SA/B
4	Taylor Perry; Mackenzie Copp; Kai Langerfeld; David de Groot	Canada	6:01.39	R
5	Ben Ruble; Robert Moffitt; Alexander Richards; Benjamin Delaney	United States	6:04.68	R

=== Repechage ===
The three fastest boats advanced to the A/B semifinals. The remaining boats were sent to the C final.

Rank	Rowers	Country	Time	Notes
1	Taylor Perry; Mackenzie Copp; Kai Langerfeld; David de Groot	Canada	5:55.75	SA/B
2	Ben Ruble; Robert Moffitt; Alexander Richards; Benjamin Delaney	United States	5:57.01	SA/B
3	Julien Montet; Benoît Brunet; Benoit Demey; Edouard Jonville	France	5:58.53	SA/B
4	David Hunt; Lawrence Brittain; John Smith; Jake Green	South Africa	5:59.66	FC
5	Povilas Stankunas; Saulius Ilonis; Bieliauskas Giedrius; Dominykas Jančionis	Lithuania	6:21.27	FC
6	Joaquin Iwan; Ignacio González; Nicolas Silvestro; Ariel Suárez	Argentina	6:30.21	FC

=== Semifinals ===
The three fastest boats in each semi advanced to the A final. The remaining boats were sent to the B final.

==== Semifinal 1 ====
Rank	Rowers	Country	Time	Notes
1	Marco Di Costanzo; Giovanni Abagnale; Matteo Castaldo; Domenico Montrone	Italy	5:56.35	FA
2	Matthew Rossiter; Moe Sbihi; Matthew Tarrant; Oliver Wynne-Griffith	Great Britain	5:57.19	FA
3	Harold Langen; Jasper Tissen; Vincent van der Want; Govert Viergever	Netherlands	5:57.33	FA
4	Ben Ruble; Robert Moffitt; Alexander Richards; Benjamin Delaney	United States	5:59.33	FB
5	Jon Carazo; Ismael Montes; Jaime Canalejo; Javier Garcia	Spain	6:03.95	FB
6	Julien Montet; Benoît Brunet; Benoit Demey; Edouard Jonville	France	6:04.68	FB

==== Semifinal 2 ====
Rank	Rowers	Country	Time	Notes
1	Joshua Hicks; Spencer Turrin; Jack Hargreaves; Alexander Hill	Australia	5:55.40	FA
2	Toger Rasmussen; Steffen Jensen; Tobias Kempf; Joachim Sutton	Denmark	5:57.51	FA
3	Wolf-Niclas Schröder; Laurits Follert; Christopher Reinhardt; Paul Gebauer	Germany	5:58.16	FA
4	Taylor Perry; Mackenzie Copp; Kai Langerfeld; David de Groot	Canada	5:59.17	FB
5	Alex Kennedy; Cameron Webster; Charles Rogerson; Anthony Allen	New Zealand	6:04.00	FB
6	Gabriel Hohensasser; Christoph Seifriedberger; Rudolph Querfeld; Ferdinand Querfeld	Austria	6:05.45	FB

=== Finals ===
The A final determined the rankings for places 1 to 6. Additional rankings were determined in the other finals.

==== Final C ====
Rank	Rowers	Country	Time
1	David Hunt; Lawrence Brittain; John Smith; Jake Green	South Africa	6:04.42
2	Joaquin Iwan; Ignacio González; Nicolas Silvestro; Ariel Suárez	Argentina	6:10.12
3	Povilas Stankunas; Saulius Ilonis; Bieliauskas Giedrius; Dominykas Jančionis	Lithuania	6:10.86

==== Final B ====
Rank	Rowers	Country	Time
1	Jon Carazo; Ismael Montes; Jaime Canalejo; Javier Garcia	Spain	5:54.10
2	Taylor Perry; Mackenzie Copp; Kai Langerfeld; David de Groot	Canada	5:55.76
3	Julien Montet; Benoît Brunet; Benoit Demey; Edouard Jonville	France	5:56.04
4	Ben Ruble; Robert Moffitt; Alexander Richards; Benjamin Delaney	United States	5:56.25
5	Gabriel Hohensasser; Christoph Seifriedberger; Rudolph Querfeld; Ferdinand Querfeld	Austria	6:01.10
6	Alex Kennedy; Cameron Webster; Charles Rogerson; Anthony Allen	New Zealand	6:03.85

==== Final A ====
Rank	Rowers	Country	Time
1st place, gold medalist(s)	Joshua Hicks; Spencer Turrin; Jack Hargreaves; Alexander Hill	Australia	5:55.24
2nd place, silver medalist(s)	Marco Di Costanzo; Giovanni Abagnale; Matteo Castaldo; Domenico Montrone	Italy	5:57.19
3rd place, bronze medalist(s)	Matthew Rossiter; Moe Sbihi; Matthew Tarrant; Will Satch	Great Britain	5:57.99
4	Harold Langen; Jasper Tissen; Vincent van der Want; Govert Viergever	Netherlands	5:58.53
5	Toger Rasmussen; Steffen Jensen; Tobias Kempf; Joachim Sutton	Denmark	6:05.05
6	Wolf-Niclas Schröder; Laurits Follert; Christopher Reinhardt; Paul Gebauer	Germany	6:10.26
