= Rowing at the 2016 Summer Olympics – Men's coxless four =

Men's coxless four at the Games of the XXXI Olympiad
- Venue: Rodrigo de Freitas Lagoon
- Date: 8–12 August 2016
- Competitors: 52 from 13 nations
- Teams: 13
- Winning time: 5:58.61

Medalists
1st place, gold medalist(s)		Alex Gregory; Moe Sbihi; George Nash; Constantine Louloudis	Great Britain
2nd place, silver medalist(s)		Will Lockwood; Josh Dunkley-Smith; Josh Booth; Alexander Hill	Australia
3rd place, bronze medalist(s)		Domenico Montrone; Matteo Castaldo; Matteo Lodo; Giuseppe Vicino	Italy

The men's coxless four competition at the 2016 Summer Olympics in Rio de Janeiro was held from 8 to 12 August at the Lagoon Rodrigo de Freitas.

The medals for the competition were presented by Sir Craig Reedie, Great Britain, member of the International Olympic Committee, and the gifts were presented by Mike Tanner, Hong Kong, Member of the Executive Committee of the International Rowing Federation.

== Results ==
=== Heats ===
First three of each heat qualify to semifinal, remainder goes to the repechage.

==== Heat 1 ====
Rank	Rower	Country	Time	Notes
1	Will Lockwood; Josh Dunkley-Smith; Josh Booth; Alexander Hill	Australia	5:54.84	SA/B
2	Maximilian Korge; Max Planer; Anton Braun; Felix Wimberger	Germany	5:59.74	SA/B
3	Harold Langen; Peter van Schie; Vincent van der Want; Govert Viergever	Netherlands	6:00.55	SA/B
4	Vlad-Dragos Aicoboae; Constantin Adam; Marius Cozmiuc; Toader-Andrei Gontaru	Romania	6:02.56	R
5	Artyom Kosov; Anton Zarutskiy; Vladislav Ryabtsev; Nikita Morgachyov	Russia	6:03.89	R

==== Heat 2 ====
Rank	Rower	Country	Time	Notes
1	Domenico Montrone; Matteo Castaldo; Matteo Lodo; Giuseppe Vicino	Italy	5:56.01	SA/B
2	Will Crothers; Tim Schrijver; Conlin McCabe; Kai Langerfeld	Canada	5:58.26	SA/B
3	Henrik Rummel; Matthew Miller; Charles Cole; Seth Weil	United States	5:58.31	SA/B
4	Vadzim Lialin; Dzianis Mihal; Mikalai Sharlap; Ihar Pashevich	Belarus	6:02.93	R

==== Heat 3 ====
Rank	Rower	Country	Time	Notes
1	Alex Gregory; Moe Sbihi; George Nash; Constantine Louloudis	Great Britain	5:55.59	SA/B
2	Dionisis Angelopoulos; Ioannis Tsilis; Georgios Tziallas; Ioannis Christou	Greece	5:59.65	SA/B
3	Benjamin Lang; Mickaël Marteau; Valentin Onfroy; Théophile Onfroy	France	6:00.72	SA/B
4	David Hunt; Jonty Smith; Vincent Breet; Jake Green	South Africa	6:01.64	R

=== Repechage ===
First three of heat qualify to semifinal.

Rank	Rower	Country	Time	Notes
1	David Hunt; Jonty Smith; Vincent Breet; Jake Green	South Africa	6:34.97	SA/B
2	Vadzim Lialin; Dzianis Mihal; Mikalai Sharlap; Ihar Pashevich	Belarus	6:36.50	SA/B
3	Artyom Kosov; Anton Zarutskiy; Vladislav Ryabtsev; Nikita Morgachyov	Russia	6:39.32	SA/B
4	Vlad-Dragos Aicoboae; Constantin Adam; Marius Cozmiuc; Toader-Andrei Gontaru	Romania	6:39.64	

=== Semifinals A/B ===
First three of each heat qualify to the Final A, remainder goes to the Final B.

==== Semifinals A/B 1 ====
Rank	Rower	Country	Time	Notes
1	Will Lockwood; Josh Dunkley-Smith; Josh Booth; Alexander Hill	Australia	6:11.82	FA
2	David Hunt; Jonty Smith; Vincent Breet; Jake Green	South Africa	6:15.22	FA
3	Domenico Montrone; Matteo Castaldo; Matteo Lodo; Giuseppe Vicino	Italy	6:16.54	FA
4	Henrik Rummel; Matthew Miller; Charles Cole; Seth Weil	United States	6:19.08	FB
5	Dionisis Angelopoulos; Ioannis Tsilis; Georgios Tziallas; Ioannis Christou	Greece	6:24.04	FB
6	Artyom Kosov; Anton Zarutskiy; Vladislav Ryabtsev; Nikita Morgachyov	Russia	6:24.89	FB

==== Semifinals A/B 2 ====
Rank	Rower	Country	Time	Notes
1	Alex Gregory; Moe Sbihi; George Nash; Constantine Louloudis	Great Britain	6:17.13	FA
2	Will Crothers; Tim Schrijver; Conlin McCabe; Kai Langerfeld	Canada	6:20.66	FA
3	Harold Langen; Peter van Schie; Vincent van der Want; Govert Viergever	Netherlands	6:21.04	FA
4	Vadzim Lialin; Dzianis Mihal; Mikalai Sharlap; Ihar Pashevich	Belarus	6:22.46	FB
5	Benjamin Lang; Mickaël Marteau; Valentin Onfroy; Théophile Onfroy	France	6:26.94	FB
6	Maximilian Korge; Max Planer; Anton Braun; Felix Wimberger	Germany	6:35.90	FB

=== Finals ===
==== Final B ====
Rank	Rower	Country	Time	Notes
1	Henrik Rummel; Matthew Miller; Charles Cole; Seth Weil	United States	5:59.20	
2	Dionisis Angelopoulos; Ioannis Tsilis; Georgios Tziallas; Ioannis Christou	Greece	6:00.56	
3	Vadzim Lialin; Dzianis Mihal; Mikalai Sharlap; Ihar Pashevich	Belarus	6:00.57	
4	Artyom Kosov; Anton Zarutskiy; Vladislav Ryabtsev; Nikita Morgachyov	Russia	6:02.09	
5	Benjamin Lang; Mickaël Marteau; Valentin Onfroy; Théophile Onfroy	France	6:02.21	
6	Maximilian Korge; Max Planer; Anton Braun; Felix Wimberger	Germany	6:06.24	

==== Final A ====
Rank	Rower	Country	Time	Notes
1st place, gold medalist(s)	Alex Gregory; Moe Sbihi; George Nash; Constantine Louloudis	Great Britain	5:58.61	
2nd place, silver medalist(s)	Will Lockwood; Josh Dunkley-Smith; Josh Booth; Alexander Hill	Australia	6:00.44	
3rd place, bronze medalist(s)	Domenico Montrone; Matteo Castaldo; Matteo Lodo; Giuseppe Vicino	Italy	6:03.85	
4	David Hunt; Jonty Smith; Vincent Breet; Jake Green	South Africa	6:05.80	
5	Harold Langen; Peter van Schie; Vincent van der Want; Govert Viergever	Netherlands	6:08.38	
6	Will Crothers; Tim Schrijver; Conlin McCabe; Kai Langerfeld	Canada	6:15.93	
