= Netherlands at the 2016 Summer Olympics =

- Flag of the Netherlands
- IOC code: NED
- NOC: Dutch Olympic Committee*; Dutch Sports Federation
- Website: www.nocnsf.nl (in Dutch)

in Rio de Janeiro
- Competitors: 242 in 21 sports
- Flag bearers: Jeroen Dubbeldam (opening); Sanne Wevers (closing)
- Medals Ranked 11th: Gold 8 Silver 7 Bronze 4 Total 19

Summer Olympics appearances (overview)
- 1900; 1904; 1908; 1912; 1920; 1924; 1928; 1932; 1936; 1948; 1952; 1956; 1960; 1964; 1968; 1972; 1976; 1980; 1984; 1988; 1992; 1996; 2000; 2004; 2008; 2012; 2016; 2020; 2024; 2028

Other related appearances
- 1906 Intercalated Games

The Netherlands competed at the 2016 Summer Olympics in Rio de Janeiro, from 5 to 21 August 2016. Since the nation's official debut in 1900, Dutch athletes had competed at every edition of the Summer Olympic Games in the modern era, with the exception of the sparsely attended 1904 Summer Olympics in St. Louis and 1956 Summer Olympics in Melbourne (except the equestrian events in Stockholm), which the Netherlands boycotted because of the Soviet invasion of Hungary.

== Medalists ==
Medal	Name	Sport	Event	Date
Gold	Anna van der Breggen	Cycling	Women's road race	7 August
Gold	Maaike Head; Ilse Paulis	Rowing	Women's lightweight double sculls	12 August
Gold	Elis Ligtlee	Cycling	Women's keirin	13 August
Gold	Dorian van Rijsselberghe	Sailing	Men's RS:X	14 August
Gold	Sharon van Rouwendaal	Swimming	Women's 10 km open water	15 August
Gold	Sanne Wevers	Gymnastics	Women's balance beam	15 August
Gold	Ferry Weertman	Swimming	Men's 10 km open water	16 August
Gold	Marit Bouwmeester	Sailing	Women's Laser Radial	16 August
Silver	Tom Dumoulin	Cycling	Men's road time trial	10 August
Silver	Chantal Achterberg; Nicole Beukers; Inge Janssen; Carline Bouw	Rowing	Women's quadruple sculls	11 August
Silver	Matthijs Büchli	Cycling	Men's keirin	16 August
Silver	Dafne Schippers	Athletics	Women's 200 m	17 August
Silver	Jelle van Gorkom	Cycling	Men's BMX	19 August
Silver	Netherlands women's national field hockey team: Naomi van As; Willemijn Bos; Carlien Dirkse van den Heuvel; Margot van Geffen; Eva de Goede; Ellen Hoog; Kelly Jonker; Marloes Keetels; Laurien Leurink; Caia van Maasakker; Kitty van Male; Maartje Paumen; Joyce Sombroek; Maria Verschoor; Xan de Waard; Lidewij Welten	Field hockey	Women's tournament	19 August
Silver	Nouchka Fontijn	Boxing	Women's middleweight	21 August
Bronze	Anicka van Emden	Judo	Women's 63 kg	9 August
Bronze	Anna van der Breggen	Cycling	Women's road time trial	10 August
Bronze	Dirk Uittenbogaard; Boaz Meylink; Kaj Hendriks; Boudewijn Röell; Olivier Siegelaar; Tone Wieten; Mechiel Versluis; Robert Lücken; Peter Wiersum (cox)	Rowing	Men's eight	13 August
Bronze	Alexander Brouwer; Robert Meeuwsen	Volleyball	Men's beach volleyball	18 August

Medals by sport
Sport	1st place, gold medalist(s)	2nd place, silver medalist(s)	3rd place, bronze medalist(s)	Total
Cycling	2	3	1	6
Sailing	2	0	0	2
Swimming	2	0	0	2
Rowing	1	1	1	3
Gymnastics	1	0	0	1
Athletics	0	1	0	1
Boxing	0	1	0	1
Field hockey	0	1	0	1
Judo	0	0	1	1
Volleyball	0	0	1	1
Total	8	7	4	19

Medals by date
Day	Date	1st place, gold medalist(s)	2nd place, silver medalist(s)	3rd place, bronze medalist(s)	Total
Day 1	6 August	0	0	0	0
Day 2	7 August	1	0	0	1
Day 3	8 August	0	0	0	0
Day 4	9 August	0	0	1	1
Day 5	10 August	0	1	1	2
Day 6	11 August	0	1	0	1
Day 7	12 August	1	0	0	1
Day 8	13 August	1	0	1	2
Day 9	14 August	1	0	0	1
Day 10	15 August	2	0	0	2
Day 11	16 August	2	1	0	3
Day 12	17 August	0	1	0	1
Day 13	18 August	0	0	1	1
Day 14	19 August	0	2	0	2
Day 15	20 August	0	0	0	0
Day 16	21 August	0	1	0	1
Total		8	7	4	19

== Competitors ==
The following is the list of number of competitors participating in the Games. Note that reserves in cycling, equestrian, field hockey and handball are not counted as athletes as long as the athlete did not compete in the Games.

Sport	Men	Women	Total
Archery	3	0	3
Athletics	11	21	32
Badminton	1	2	3
Boxing	2	1	3
Cycling	16	10	26
Diving	0	1	1
Equestrian	9	3	12
Fencing	1	0	1
Field hockey	16	16	32
Golf	1	0	1
Gymnastics	5	5	10
Handball	0	14	14
Judo	6	5	11
Rowing	19	17	36
Sailing	4	7	11
Swimming	7	10	17
Table tennis	0	3	3
Tennis	2	1	3
Taekwondo	0	1	1
Triathlon	0	1	1
Volleyball	4	16	20
Wrestling	0	1	1
Total	107	135	242

== Archery ==
The Netherlands qualified three archers into the men's individual and team events after having secured a top eight finish in the team recurve event at the 2015 World Archery Championships in Copenhagen, Denmark.

Athlete	Event	Ranking round		Round of 64	Round of 32	Round of 16	Quarterfinals	Semifinals	Final / BM	
Athlete	Event	Score	Seed	Opposition Score	Opposition Score	Opposition Score	Opposition Score	Opposition Score	Opposition Score	Rank
Sjef van den Berg	Men's individual	684	4	Jensen (TGA); W 7–3	Gazoz (TUR); W 7–3	Soto (CHI); W 6*–5	Lee S-y (KOR); W 6–4	Valladont (FRA); L 3–7	Ellison (USA); L 2–6	4
Mitch Dielemans	Men's individual	634	58	Furukawa (JPN); L 1–7	did not advance					
Rick van der Ven	Men's individual	663	27	Huston (GBR); L 4–6	did not advance					
Sjef van den Berg; Mitch Dielemans; Rick van der Ven	Men's team	1981	9	—N/a		Spain; W 5–1	South Korea; L 0–6	did not advance		

== Athletics ==
The Netherlands has qualified 32 athletes (11 men and 21 women) into the following athletics events.

Key

- Note–Ranks given for track events are within the athlete's heat only
- Q = Qualified for the next round
- q = Qualified for the next round as a fastest loser or, in field events, by position without achieving the qualifying target
- NR = National record
- N/A = Round not applicable for the event
- Bye = Athlete not required to compete in round
- NM = No mark

Track & road events
Men

Athlete	Event	Heat		Quarterfinal		Semifinal		Final	
Athlete	Event	Result	Rank	Result	Rank	Result	Rank	Result	Rank
Solomon Bockarie	100 m	Bye		10.36	=5	Did not advance			
Churandy Martina	100 m	Bye		10.22	5	Did not advance			
Solomon Bockarie	200 m	20.42	3	—N/a		Did not advance			
Churandy Martina	200 m	20.29	2 Q	—N/a		20.10	2 Q	20.13	5
Liemarvin Bonevacia	400 m	45.49	3 Q	—N/a		45.03	7	Did not advance	
Solomon Bockarie; Giovanni Codrington; Dimitri Juliet*; Churandy Martina; Hensley Paulina; Joren Tromp*	4 × 100 m relay	38.53	8	—N/a				Did not advance	
Abdi Nageeye	Marathon	—N/a						2:13:01	11

Women

Athlete	Event	Heat		Quarterfinal		Semifinal		Final	
Athlete	Event	Result	Rank	Result	Rank	Result	Rank	Result	Rank
Dafne Schippers	100 m	Bye		11.16	1 Q	10.90	2 Q	10.90	5
Jamile Samuel	200 m	23.04	3	—N/a		Did not advance			
Tessa van Schagen	200 m	23.41	4	—N/a		Did not advance			
Dafne Schippers	200 m	22.51	1 Q	—N/a		21.96	1 Q	21.88 SB	2nd place, silver medalist(s)
Sifan Hassan	800 m	2:00.27	5	—N/a		Did not avance			
Sifan Hassan	1500 m	4:06.64	1 Q	—N/a		4:03.62	2 Q	4:11.23	5
Maureen Koster	1500 m	4:13.15	8	—N/a		Did not advance			
Maureen Koster	5000 m	DNS		—N/a				Did not advance	
Susan Kuijken	5000 m	15:19.96	5 Q	—N/a				15:00.69	8
Susan Kuijken	10000 m	—N/a						31:32.43	14
Jip Vastenburg	10000 m	—N/a						32:08.92	28
Nadine Visser	100 m hurdles	13.07	4	—N/a		Did not advance			
Marije van Hunenstijn*; Tasa Jiya*; Jamile Samuel; Tessa van Schagen; Dafne Schippers; Naomi Sedney	4 × 100 m relay	42.88	6	—N/a				Did not advance	
Madiea Ghafoor*; Eva Hovenkamp; Nicky van Leuveren; Laura de Witte; Lisanne de Witte	4 × 400 m relay	3:26.98	6	—N/a				Did not advance	
Andrea Deelstra	Marathon	—N/a						2:40:49	60

Field events

Athlete	Event	Qualification		Final	
Athlete	Event	Distance	Position	Distance	Position
Fabian Florant	Men's triple jump	16.51	22	Did not advance	
Femke Pluim	Women's pole vault	4.15	=29	Did not advance	
Melissa Boekelman	Women's shot put	17.69	15	Did not advance	

Combined events – Men's decathlon

Athlete	Event	100 m	LJ	SP	HJ	400 m	110H	DT	PV	JT	1500 m	Final	Rank
Pieter Braun	Result	11.03	7.55	13.90	1.95	DNS	—	—	—	—	—	DNF	
Pieter Braun	Points	854	947	722	758	0	—	—	—	—	—	DNF	
Eelco Sintnicolaas	Result	10.87	DNS	—	—	—	—	—	—	—	—	DNF	
Eelco Sintnicolaas	Points	890	0	—	—	—	—	—	—	—	—	DNF	

Combined events – Women's heptathlon

Athlete	Event	100H	HJ	SP	200 m	LJ	JT	800 m	Final	Rank
Nadine Broersen	Result	13.56	1.77	14.04	24.94	6.15	50.80	2:17.55	6300	13
Nadine Broersen	Points	1041	941	797	892	896	876	857	6300	13
Anouk Vetter	Result	13.47	1.77	14.78	23.93	6.10	48.42	2:17.71	6394	10
Anouk Vetter	Points	1055	941	846	987	880	830	855	6394	10
Nadine Visser	Result	13.02	1.68	12.84	24.34	6.35	42.48	2:14.47	6190	19
Nadine Visser	Points	1121	830	717	948	959	715	900	6190	19

== Badminton ==
The Netherlands qualified three badminton players for each of the following events into the Olympic tournament. Selena Piek, along with her partners Eefje Muskens and Jacco Arends, had claimed their Olympic spots each in the women's and mixed doubles, respectively, by virtue of their top 16 national finish in the BWF World Rankings as of 5 May 2016.

Athlete	Event	Group Stage				Quarterfinal	Semifinal	Final / BM	
Athlete	Event	Opposition Score	Opposition Score	Opposition Score	Rank	Opposition Score	Opposition Score	Opposition Score	Rank
Eefje Muskens; Selena Piek	Women's doubles	Supajirakul / Taerattanachai (THA); W (21–13, 22–20)	Gutta / Ponnappa (IND); W (21–16, 16–21, 21–17)	Matsutomo / Takahashi (JPN); L (9–21, 11–21)	2 Q	Jung K-e / Shin S-c (KOR); L (13–21, 22–20, 14–21)	Did not advance		
Jacco Arends; Selena Piek	Mixed doubles	Kazuno / Kurihara (JPN); L (14–21, 19–21)	Ko S-h / Kim H-n (KOR); L (10–21, 10–21)	Chew / Subandhi (USA); W (21–15, 21–19)	3	Did not advance			

== Boxing ==
The Netherlands entered three boxers to compete in each of the following weight classes into the Olympic boxing tournament for the first time since 1992. Peter Müllenberg was the first Dutch boxer being selected to the Olympic team with a semifinal victory at the 2016 European Qualification Tournament in Samsun, Turkey. Meanwhile, Nouchka Fontijn had claimed her Olympic spot with a quarterfinal victory in the women's middleweight division at the World Championships in Astana, Kazakhstan.

Enrico Lacruz secured an additional Olympic place on the Dutch roster with his quarterfinal triumph at the 2016 AIBA World Qualifying Tournament in Baku, Azerbaijan.

Athlete	Event	Round of 32	Round of 16	Quarterfinals	Semifinals	Final	
Athlete	Event	Opposition Result	Opposition Result	Opposition Result	Opposition Result	Opposition Result	Rank
Enrico Lacruz	Men's lightweight	Lai C-e (TPE); W 2–1	Otgondalai (MGL); L 1–2	Did not advance			
Peter Müllenberg	Men's light heavyweight	Rouzbahani (IRI); W 3–0	Mammadov (AZE); L 0–3	Did not advance			
Nouchka Fontijn	Women's middleweight	—N/a	Bye	Marshall (GBR); W 2–0	Li Q (CHN); W 2–1	Shields (USA); L 0–3	2nd place, silver medalist(s)

== Cycling ==
=== Road ===
Dutch riders qualified for the following quota places in the men's and women's Olympic road race by virtue of their top 15 final national ranking in the 2015 UCI World Tour (for men) and top 22 in the UCI World Ranking (for women). The Dutch women's road cycling squad was named to the Olympic roster on May 17, 2016, and was preceded by the men's squad two weeks later.

Men

Athlete	Event	Time	Rank
Tom Dumoulin	Road race	Did not finish	
Tom Dumoulin	Time trial	1:13:02.83	2nd place, silver medalist(s)
Steven Kruijswijk	Road race	6:22:23	39
Bauke Mollema	Road race	6:13:36	17
Wout Poels	Road race	Did not finish	
Wout Poels	Time trial	Did not start	

Women

Athlete	Event	Time	Rank
Anna van der Breggen	Road race	3:51:27	1st place, gold medalist(s)
Anna van der Breggen	Time trial	44:37.80	3rd place, bronze medalist(s)
Ellen van Dijk	Road race	3:56:34	21
Ellen van Dijk	Time trial	44:48.74	4
Annemiek van Vleuten	Road race	Did not finish	
Marianne Vos	Road race	3:52:41	9

=== Track ===
Following the completion of the 2016 UCI Track Cycling World Championships, Dutch riders have accumulated spots in both men's and women's team sprint, as well as both the men's and women's omnium. As a result of their place in the men's and women's team sprint, Netherlands has assured its right to enter two riders in both men's and women's sprint and men's and women's keirin.

Sprint

Athlete	Event	Qualification		Round 1	Repechage 1	Round 2	Repechage 2	Quarterfinals	Semifinals	Final	
Athlete	Event	Time Speed (km/h)	Rank	Opposition Time Speed (km/h)	Opposition Result	Opposition Result	Opposition Result	Opposition Result	Opposition Result	Opposition Result	Rank
Theo Bos	Men's sprint	10.140; 71.005	21	Did not advance							
Jeffrey Hoogland	Men's sprint	9.837; 73.193	8 Q	Pervis (FRA); W 10.181; 70.719	Bye	Baugé (FRA); L	Constable (AUS); Levy (GER); L	Did not advance		9th place final Levy (GER); Webster (NZL); Puerta (COL); L	11
Elis Ligtlee	Women's sprint	10.803; 66.648	4 Q	Gong (CHN); W 11.425; 63.019	Bye	Krupeckaitė (LTU); W 11.360; 63.380	Bye	Voynova (RUS); W 11.405, W 11.391	James (GBR); L, L	Marchant (GBR); L, L	4
Laurine van Riessen	Women's sprint	11.023; 65.317	13 Q	Vogel (GER); L	Meares (AUS); Ismayilova (AZE); L	Did not advance					

Team sprint

Athlete	Event	Qualification		Semifinals		Final	
Athlete	Event	Time Speed (km/h)	Rank	Opposition Time Speed (km/h)	Rank	Opposition Time Speed (km/h)	Rank
Theo Bos; Matthijs Büchli*; Jeffrey Hoogland; Nils van 't Hoenderdaal	Men's team sprint	43.688; 61.801	6 Q	Australia; L 43.552; 61.994	6	Did not advance	
Elis Ligtlee; Laurine van Riessen	Women's team sprint	33.189; 54.234	5 Q	Australia; L 32.792; 54.891	5	Did not advance	

* Shanne Braspennincx is the first reserve for the women's team sprint. She lives outside the Olympic Village during the Games, while she is not a member of the Dutch Olympic Team.
** Nils van 't Hoenderdaal is the first reserve for the men's team sprint.

Pursuit

Athlete	Event	Qualification		Semifinals		Final	
Athlete	Event	Time	Rank	Opponent Results	Rank	Opponent Results	Rank
Joost van der Burg; Nils van 't Hoenderdaal*; Jan-Willem van Schip; Wim Stroetinga; Tim Veldt	Men's team pursuit	DNF		did not advance			

Keirin

Athlete	Event	1st round	Repechage	2nd round	Final
Athlete	Event	Rank	Rank	Rank	Rank
Theo Bos	Men's keirin	3 R	3	did not advance	
Matthijs Büchli	Men's keirin	2 Q	Bye	2 Q	2nd place, silver medalist(s)
Elis Ligtlee	Women's keirin	1 Q	Bye	2 Q	1st place, gold medalist(s)
Laurine van Riessen	Women's keirin	4 R	1 Q	4	9

Omnium

Athlete	Event	Scratch race		Individual pursuit			Elimination race		Time trial			Flying lap			Points race		Total points	Rank
Athlete	Event	Rank	Points	Time	Rank	Points	Rank	Points	Time	Rank	Points	Time	Rank	Points	Points	Rank	Total points	Rank
Tim Veldt	Men's omnium	16	10	4:22.856	7	28	16	10	1:03.464	7	28	13.170	7	28	7	7	111	9
Kirsten Wild	Women's omnium	9	24	3:31.941	5	32	4	34	36.562	13	16	14.023	4	34	43	5	183	6

=== Mountain biking ===
Dutch mountain bikers qualified for two men's quota places into the Olympic cross-country race, as a result of the nation's sixth-place finish in the UCI Olympic Ranking List of May 25, 2016. Rudi van Houts was the first mountain biker, who met the criteria set by the NOC*NSF being selected to the Dutch cycling squad by virtue of his top ten finish at the 2015 European Mountain Bike Championships in Chies d'Alpago, Italy

The Dutch NOC*NSF decided to refuse the second quota place, as they didn't have a second mountain biker who met the national criteria. As a result of this, Van Houts was the only Dutch mountain biker to compete at the Games.

Originally, Anne Terpstra finished in eleventh place at the 2016 European Mountain Bike Championships, which was not enough to qualify for Rio 2016, while she did not manage to have a top 10 finish at a European Championships or a World Championships during the qualification period. However, the UCI decided to disqualify the Russian mountain biker Ekateryna Anoshina, who finished in eighth place. After the disqualification, Terpstra finished in tenth place and was qualified for Rio 2016.

Athlete	Event	Time	Rank
Rudi van Houts	Men's cross-country	DNF	
Anne Terpstra	Women's cross-country	1:36:33	15

=== BMX ===
The Netherlands has received three men's and two women's quota spots for BMX at the Olympics as a result of the nation's second-place finish for men and third for women in the UCI Olympic Ranking List of May 30, 2016. The BMX cycling team was announced on 1 June 2016.

Athlete	Event	Seeding		Quarterfinal		Semifinal		Final	
Athlete	Event	Result	Rank	Points	Rank	Points	Rank	Result	Rank
Twan van Gendt	Men's BMX	34.93	6	10	3 Q	15	5	did not advance	
Jelle van Gorkom	Men's BMX	35.41	17	6	1 Q	11	2 Q	35.31	2nd place, silver medalist(s)
Niek Kimmann	Men's BMX	35.07	8	14	4 Q	12	3 Q	36.57	7
Merle van Benthem	Women's BMX	35.64	9	—N/a		21	8	did not advance	
Laura Smulders	Women's BMX	35.11	3	—N/a		4	1 Q	1:52.23	7

== Diving ==
Dutch divers qualified for one individual spot at the Olympics through the 2015 FINA World Championships, signifying the nation's Olympic return to the sport for the first time since 1992.

Athlete	Event	Preliminaries		Semifinals		Final	
Athlete	Event	Points	Rank	Points	Rank	Points	Rank
Uschi Freitag	Women's 3 m springboard	317.10	11 Q	298.95	14	did not advance	

== Equestrian ==
The Netherlands became one of the first three nations to earn places at the Games, qualifying a complete team in dressage by winning the bronze medal in the team event at the 2014 FEI World Equestrian Games. The Dutch eventing team also qualified for Rio by winning the bronze medal at the same World Games.

=== Dressage ===
The Dutch dressage team was named on noon of 17 July 2016, after two selection events: CDIO Rotterdam (23-26 June) and Dutch Championships (15-17 July).

Athlete	Horse	Event	Grand Prix		Grand Prix Special		Grand Prix Freestyle		Overall	
Athlete	Horse	Event	Score	Rank	Score	Rank	Score	Rank	Score	Rank
Adelinde Cornelissen	Parzival	Individual	Retired		did not advance				DNF	
Edward Gal	Voice	Individual	75.271	16 Q	73.655	20	did not advance		73.655	20
Hans Peter Minderhoud	Johnson	Individual	76.957	9 Q	75.224	13 Q	80.571	9	80.571	9
Diederik van Silfhout	Arlando	Individual	75.900	13 Q	76.092	11 Q	79.535	11	79.535	11
Adelinde Cornelissen; Edward Gal; Hans Peter Minderhoud; Diederik van Silfhout	See above	Team	76.043	4 Q	74.991	4	—N/a		74.991	4

=== Eventing ===
Athlete	Horse	Event	Dressage		Cross-country			Jumping						Total	
Athlete	Horse	Event	Dressage		Cross-country			Qualifier			Final			Total	
Athlete	Horse	Event	Penalties	Rank	Penalties	Total	Rank	Penalties	Total	Rank	Penalties	Total	Rank	Penalties	Rank
Merel Blom	Rumour Has It	Individual	54.40	53	12.00	66.40	20	2.00	68.40	19 Q	8.00	76.40	19	76.40	19
Tim Lips	Bayro	Individual	46.00	20	28.00	74.00	25	8.00	82.00	23 Q	0.00	82.00	21	82.00	21
Alice Naber-Lozeman	Peter Parker	Individual	46.20	21	52.00	98.20	32	4.00	102.20	32	did not advance			102.20	32
Theo van de Vendel	Zindane	Individual	65.70 #	64	Eliminated			did not advance							
Merel Blom; Tim Lips; Alice Naber-Lozeman; Theo van de Vendel	See above	Team	146.60	11	92.00	238.60	5	14.00	252.60	6	—N/a			252.60	6

"#" indicates that the score of this rider does not count in the team competition, since only the best three results of a team are counted.

=== Jumping ===
Athlete	Horse	Event	Qualification								Final					Total	
Athlete	Horse	Event	Round 1		Round 2			Round 3			Round A		Round B			Total	
Athlete	Horse	Event	Penalties	Rank	Penalties	Total	Rank	Penalties	Total	Rank	Penalties	Rank	Penalties	Total	Rank	Penalties	Rank
Jeroen Dubbeldam	Zenith	Individual	4	=27 Q	0	4	=15 Q	5	9	=23 Q	0	=1 Q	1	1	=10	1	=10
Harrie Smolders	Emerald	Individual	0	=1 Q	0	0	=1 Q	12	12	=31 Q	4	=16 Q	DNS			DNF	27
Maikel van der Vleuten	Verdi	Individual	0	=1 Q	0	0	=1 Q	1	1	=2 Q	4	=16 Q	5	9	=18	9	=18
Jur Vrieling	Zirocco Blue	Individual	DSQ #	TO	DSQ #	TO		DNS #	TO		did not advance						
Jeroen Dubbeldam; Harrie Smolders; Maikel van der Vleuten; Jur Vrieling	See above	Team	4	=3 Q	—N/a						0	=1 Q	18	18	=7	18	=7

"#" indicates that the score of this rider does not count in the team competition, since only the best three results of a team are counted.

"TO" indicates that Vrieling was disqualified from competing for a place in the individual final rounds. He was allowed to start in the second and third qualification round, however, to be able to set a score for the team competition. After another disqualification in the second qualification round, Vrieling withdrew.

(*) Gerco Schröder and his horse London is the first reserve for the Dutch jumping squad. He resided outside the Olympic Village during the Games, as he was not a member of the Dutch Olympic Team.

== Fencing ==
Following the completion of the Grand Prix finals, Netherlands has entered one fencer into the Olympic competition. 2012 Olympian Bas Verwijlen had claimed a spot in the men's épée, as one of the top two individual fencers from Europe outside the world's top eight qualified teams in the FIE Adjusted Official Rankings.

Athlete	Event	Round of 64	Round of 32	Round of 16	Quarterfinal	Semifinal	Final / BM	
Athlete	Event	Opposition Score	Opposition Score	Opposition Score	Opposition Score	Opposition Score	Opposition Score	Rank
Bas Verwijlen	Men's épée	Bye	Avdeev (RUS); L 9–15	did not advance				

== Field hockey ==
Summary

Key:

- FT – After full time.
- P – Match decided by penalty-shootout.

Team	Event	Group stage						Quarterfinal	Semifinal	Final / BM	
Team	Event	Opposition Score	Opposition Score	Opposition Score	Opposition Score	Opposition Score	Rank	Opposition Score	Opposition Score	Opposition Score	Rank
Netherlands men's	Men's tournament	Argentina; D 3–3	Ireland; W 5–0	Canada; W 7–0	India; W 2–1	Germany; L 1–2	2 Q	Australia; W 4–0	Belgium; L 1–3	Germany; L 3–4^{P} FT: 1–1	4
Netherlands women's	Women's tournament	Spain; W 5–0	South Korea; W 4–0	China; W 1–0	New Zealand; D 1–1	Germany; W 2–0	1 Q	Argentina; W 3–2	Germany; W 4–3^{P} FT: 1–1	Great Britain; L 0–2^{P} FT: 3–3	2nd place, silver medalist(s)

=== Men's tournament ===
The Netherlands men's field hockey team qualified for the Olympics by having achieved a top three finish at the 2014–15 Men's FIH Hockey World League Semifinals.

Team roster

The following is the Netherlands roster in the men's field hockey tournament of the 2016 Summer Olympics.

Head coach: Max Caldas

1. Jaap Stockmann (GK)
6. Glenn Schuurman
8. Billy Bakker
9. Seve van Ass
10. Valentin Verga
11. Jeroen Hertzberger
12. Sander de Wijn
13. Sander Baart
14. Robbert Kemperman
16. Mirco Pruyser
19. Bob de Voogd
21. Jorrit Croon
22. Rogier Hofman
24. Robert van der Horst (C)
29. Hidde Turkstra
30. Mink van der Weerden

Reserves:

- Pirmin Blaak (GK)
- Constantijn Jonker

Group play

Pos	Team	Pld	W	D	L	GF	GA	GD	Pts	Qualification
1	Germany	5	4	1	0	17	10	+7	13	Quarter-finals
2	Netherlands	5	3	1	1	18	6	+12	10	Quarter-finals
3	Argentina	5	2	2	1	14	12	+2	8	Quarter-finals
4	India	5	2	1	2	9	9	0	7	Quarter-finals
5	Ireland	5	1	0	4	10	16	−6	3	
6	Canada	5	0	1	4	7	22	−15	1	

Source: Rio2016
Rules for classification: 1) Points; 2) Matches won; 3) Goal difference; 4) Goals for; 5) Head-to-head result.

6 August 2016
10:00

Argentina	3–3	Netherlands
Vila 29', 49'; Paredes 54'	Report	Hertzberger 18'; Van der Weerden 36'; Van Ass 43'

Umpires:
Martin Madden (GBR)
Adam Kearns (AUS)

7 August 2016
18:00

Netherlands	5–0	Ireland
van der Weerden 7', 40'; Croon 8'; Pruijser 42'; Hertzberger 60'	Report

Umpires:
Nathan Stagno (GBR)
Tim Pullman (AUS)

9 August 2016
13:30

Netherlands	7–0	Canada
Van Ass 9'; Van der Weerden 25', 52', 60'; Hertzberger 29', 36'; Kemperman 58'	Report

Umpires:
Murray Grime (AUS)
Nathan Stagno (GBR)

11 August 2016
10:00

Netherlands	2–1	India
Hofman 35'; Van der Weerden 54'	Report	Raghunath 38'

Umpires:
Murray Grime (AUS)
Martin Madden (GBR)

12 August 2016
13:30

Germany	2–1	Netherlands
Fuchs 7'; Grambusch 33'	Report	Van As 44'

Umpires:
Murray Grime (AUS)
Marcelo Servetto (ESP)

Quarterfinal

14 August 2016
18:00

Netherlands	4–0	Australia
Bakker 1'; De Voogd 28'; Verga 33'; Van der Weerden 49'	Report

Umpires:
Christian Blasch (GER)
Paco Vázquez (ESP)

Semifinal

16 August 2016
17:00

Belgium	3–1	Netherlands
Truyens 25'; Dohmen 29' van Aubel 46'	Report	van der Weerden 29'

Umpires:
Germán Montes de Oca (ARG)
Murray Grime (AUS)

Bronze medal match

18 August 2016
12:00

Netherlands	1–1	Germany
Croon 35'	Report	M. Grambusch 42'
Penalties
Bakker (penalty shoot-out missed); Kemperman (penalty shoot-out scored); Hertzberger (penalty shoot-out scored); Van Ass (penalty shoot-out scored); De Wijn (penalty shoot-out missed)	3–4	(penalty shoot-out scored) Hauke; (penalty shoot-out scored) M. Grambusch; (penalty shoot-out scored) Herzbruch; (penalty shoot-out scored) Butt

Umpires:
Marcelo Servetto (ESP)
Martin Madden (GBR)

=== Women's tournament ===
The Netherlands women's field hockey team qualified for the Olympics by having achieved a top three finish at the second stop of the 2014–15 Women's FIH Hockey World League Semifinals.

Team roster

The following is the Netherlands roster in the women's field hockey tournament of the 2016 Summer Olympics.

Head coach: Alyson Annan

No.	Pos.	Player	Date of birth (age)	Caps	Goals	Club
1	GK	Joyce Sombroek	10 September 1990 (aged 25)			
3	FW	Xan de Waard	8 November 1995 (aged 20)			
4	FW	Kitty van Male	5 June 1988 (aged 28)			
6	MF	Laurien Leurink	13 November 1994 (aged 21)			
7	DF	Willemijn Bos	2 May 1988 (aged 28)			
8	MF	Marloes Keetels	4 May 1993 (aged 23)			
9	MF	Carlien Dirkse van den Heuvel	16 April 1987 (aged 29)			
10	FW	Kelly Jonker	23 May 1990 (aged 26)			
11	MF	Maria Verschoor	22 April 1994 (aged 22)			
12	MF	Lidewij Welten	16 July 1990 (aged 26)			
13	DF	Caia van Maasakker	5 April 1989 (aged 27)			
17	DF	Maartje Paumen	19 September 1985 (aged 30)			
18	MF	Naomi van As	26 July 1983 (aged 33)			
19	FW	Ellen Hoog	26 March 1986 (aged 30)			
23	DF	Margot van Geffen	23 November 1989 (aged 26)			
24	MF	Eva de Goede	23 March 1989 (aged 27)			

Group play

Pos	Team	Pld	W	D	L	GF	GA	GD	Pts	Qualification
1	Netherlands	5	4	1	0	13	1	+12	13	Quarter-finals
2	New Zealand	5	3	1	1	11	5	+6	10	Quarter-finals
3	Germany	5	2	1	2	6	6	0	7	Quarter-finals
4	Spain	5	2	0	3	6	12	−6	6	Quarter-finals
5	China	5	1	2	2	3	5	−2	5	
6	South Korea	5	0	1	4	3	13	−10	1	

Source: Rio2016
Rules for classification: 1) Points; 2) Matches won; 3) Goal difference; 4) Goals for; 5) Head-to-head result.

7 August 2016
12:30

Netherlands	5–0	Spain
Welten 12'; Leurink 16'; Keetels 19'; Paumen 23', 49'	Report

Umpires:
Amy Baxter (USA)
Amber Church (NZL)

8 August 2016
17:00

Netherlands	4–0	South Korea
Jonker 9', 30', 42'; Dirkse van den Heuvel 46'	Report

Umpires:
Kelly Hudson (NZL)
Sarah Wilson (GBR)

10 August 2016
18:00

China	0–1	Netherlands
	Report	Van Male 59'

Umpires:
Kelly Hudson (NZL)
Carolina de la Fuente (ARG)

12 August 2016
11:00

New Zealand	1–1	Netherlands
Whitelock 59'	Report	Paumen 28'

Umpires:
Carolina de la Fuente (ARG)
Michelle Joubert (RSA)

13 August 2016
12:30

Netherlands	2–0	Germany
De Waard 5'; Van Male 44'	Report

Umpires:
Soledad Iparraguirre (ARG)
Melissa Trivic (AUS)

Quarterfinal

15 August 2016
20:30

Netherlands	3–2	Argentina
Welten 5'; Leurink 25'; Jonker 47'	Report	F. Habif 41'; Merino 53'

Umpires:
Michelle Joubert (RSA)
Laurine Delforge (BEL)

Semifinal

17 August 2016
12:00

Netherlands	1–1	Germany
Paumen 16'	Report	Schütze 11'
Penalties
Bos (penalty shoot-out scored); Hoog (penalty shoot-out missed); Keetels (penalty shoot-out missed); Van Geffen (penalty shoot-out scored); Jonker (penalty shoot-out missed); Bos (penalty shoot-out scored); Hoog (penalty shoot-out scored)	4–3	(penalty shoot-out scored) Müller-Wieland; (penalty shoot-out scored) Mävers; (penalty shoot-out missed) Hahn; (penalty shoot-out missed) Teschke; (penalty shoot-out missed) Hauke; (penalty shoot-out scored) Müller-Wieland; (penalty shoot-out missed) Mävers

Umpires:
Laurine Delforge (BEL)
Soledad Iparraguiree (ARG)

Gold medal match

19 August 2016
17:00

Netherlands	3–3	Great Britain
Van Male 16', 37'; Paumen 25'	Report	Owsley 10'; Cullen 26'; White 52'
Penalties
Bos (penalty shoot-out missed); Hoog (penalty shoot-out missed); Leurink (penalty shoot-out missed); Van Geffen (penalty shoot-out missed)	0–2	(penalty shoot-out missed) H. Richardson-Walsh; (penalty shoot-out missed) Danson; (penalty shoot-out scored) Bray; (penalty shoot-out missed) Unsworth; (penalty shoot-out scored) Webb

Umpires:
Michelle Joubert (RSA)
Laurine Delforge (BEL)

== Golf ==
Netherlands has entered one golfer into the Olympic tournament. Joost Luiten (world no. 65) qualified directly among the top 60 eligible players for their respective individual events based on the IGF World Rankings as of 11 July 2016. Christel Boeljon and Anne van Dam also managed to reach a top 60 finish in the same list, but they did not manage to reach a top 100 finish at the World Ranking, which was the criteria set by the NOC*NSF to be qualified.

Athlete	Event	Round 1	Round 2	Round 3	Round 4	Total	Par	Rank
Joost Luiten	Men's individual	72	70	70	70	282	−2	=27

== Gymnastics ==
=== Artistic ===
Netherlands fielded a full squad of ten gymnasts (five men and five women). Men's team and women's team have qualified for the first time since 1928 and 1976 Olympics, respectively. The women's team qualified through a top eight finish at the 2015 World Artistic Gymnastics Championships in Glasgow. Meanwhile, the men's team had claimed one of the remaining four spots in the team all-around at the Olympic Test Event in Rio de Janeiro.

Men
Team

Athlete	Event	Qualification								Final							
Athlete	Event	Apparatus						Total	Rank	Apparatus						Total	Rank
Athlete	Event	F	PH	R	V	PB	HB	Total	Rank	F	PH	R	V	PB	HB	Total	Rank
Bart Deurloo	Team	14.000	14.200	14.266	14.858	14.566	15.100	86.990	14 Q	did not advance							
Yuri van Gelder	Team	—N/a		15.333 Q	—N/a					did not advance							
Frank Rijken	Team	13.866	13.966	13.700	14.200	14.500	14.033	84.265	33	did not advance							
Jeffrey Wammes	Team	14.533	11.933	12.941	14.900	14.333	14.066	82.706	40	did not advance							
Epke Zonderland	Team	—N/a					15.366 Q	—N/a		did not advance							
Total	Team	42.399	40.099	43.299	43.958	43.399	44.532	257.686	10	did not advance							

Individual finals

Athlete	Event	Apparatus						Total	Rank
Athlete	Event	F	PH	R	V	PB	HB	Total	Rank
Bart Deurloo	All-around	14.666	14.733	14.633	14.700	14.300	14.566	87.598	15
Yuri van Gelder	Rings	Banned by NOC due to misbehaviour							
Epke Zonderland	Horizontal bar	—N/a					14.033	14.033	7

Women
Team

Athlete	Event	Qualification						Final					
Athlete	Event	Apparatus				Total	Rank	Apparatus				Total	Rank
Athlete	Event	V	UB	BB	F	Total	Rank	V	UB	BB	F	Total	Rank
Eythora Thorsdottir	Team	14.900	14.733	14.300	13.633	57.566	7 Q	15.000	14.733	14.566	13.900	—N/a	
Céline van Gerner	Team	13.766	14.533	13.800	13.716	55.815	25	—N/a	14.400	—N/a	13.933	—N/a	
Vera van Pol	Team	14.266	—N/a		13.500	—N/a		14.100	—N/a			—N/a	
Lieke Wevers	Team	13.966	14.600	14.366	13.850	56.782	15 Q	13.933	—N/a	14.266	13.833	—N/a	
Sanne Wevers	Team	—N/a	14.408	15.066 Q	—N/a			—N/a	14.533	15.250	—N/a	—N/a	
Total	Team	43.132	43.866	43.732	41.199	171.929	8 Q	43.033	43.666	44.082	41.666	172.447	7

Individual finals

Athlete	Event	Apparatus				Total	Rank
Athlete	Event	V	UB	BB	F	Total	Rank
Eythora Thorsdottir	All-around	14.833	14.200	14.066	14.533	57.632	9
Lieke Wevers	All-around	14.066	14.600	13.066	14.133	55.865	20
Sanne Wevers	Balance beam	—N/a		15.466	—N/a	15.466	1st place, gold medalist(s)

== Handball ==
Summary

Key:

- ET – After extra time
- P – Match decided by penalty-shootout.

Team	Event	Group stage						Quarterfinal	Semifinal	Final / BM	
Team	Event	Opposition Score	Opposition Score	Opposition Score	Opposition Score	Opposition Score	Rank	Opposition Score	Opposition Score	Opposition Score	Rank
Netherlands women's	Women's tournament	France; L 14–18	Argentina; W 26–18	South Korea; D 32–32	Sweden; D 29–29	Russia; L 34–38	4 Q	Brazil; W 32–23	France; L 23–24	Norway; L 26–36	4

=== Women's tournament ===
The Netherlands women's handball team qualified for the Olympics by virtue of a top two finish at the first meet of the Olympic Qualification Tournament in Metz, France.

Team roster

The following is the Dutch roster in the women's handball tournament of the 2016 Summer Olympics.

Head coach: (Netherlands) Henk Groener

No.	Pos.	Name	Date of birth (age)	Height	App.	Goals	Club
5	LB	Jessy Kramer	16 February 1990 (aged 26)	1.77 m	97	83	(France) Toulon Handball
6	RB	Laura van der Heijden	27 June 1990 (aged 26)	1.72 m	148	477	(Denmark) Team Esbjerg
8	LB	Lois Abbingh	13 August 1992 (aged 23)	1.77 m	92	405	(France) Issy-Paris
9	RB	Sanne van Olphen	13 March 1989 (aged 27)	1.77 m	65	110	(France) Toulon Saint-Cyr Var Handball
10	P	Danick Snelder	22 May 1990 (aged 26)	1.78 m	120	297	(Hungary) Ferencváros
13	P	Yvette Broch	23 December 1990 (aged 25)	1.85 m	84	198	(Hungary) Győri ETO
17	CB	Cornelia Groot	4 May 1988 (aged 28)	1.75 m	96	291	(Hungary) Győri ETO
18	LB	Kelly Dulfer	21 March 1994 (aged 22)	1.86 m	50	39	(Germany) VfL Oldenburg
21	LW	Michelle Goos	27 December 1989 (aged 26)	1.78 m	58	102	(Germany) Buxtehuder SV
23	GK	Jasmina Janković	6 December 1986 (aged 29)	1.68 m	56	0	(Germany) TuS Metzingen
24	LW	Martine Smeets	5 May 1990 (aged 26)	1.72 m	58	105	(Germany) SG BBM Bietigheim
26	RW	Angela Malestein	31 January 1993 (aged 23)	1.73 m	85	149	(Germany) SG BBM Bietigheim
30	RW	Jurswailly Luciano	25 March 1991 (aged 25)	1.71 m	45	104	(France) Metz Handball
33	GK	Tess Wester	19 May 1993 (aged 23)	1.78 m	43	2	(Germany) SG BBM Bietigheim
79	CB	Estavana Polman	5 August 1992 (aged 24)	1.74 m	89	293	(Denmark) Team Esbjerg

Group play

Pos	Team	Pld	W	D	L	GF	GA	GD	Pts	Qualification
1	Russia	5	5	0	0	165	147	+18	10	Quarter-finals
2	France	5	4	0	1	118	93	+25	8	Quarter-finals
3	Sweden	5	2	1	2	150	141	+9	5	Quarter-finals
4	Netherlands	5	1	2	2	135	135	0	4	Quarter-finals
5	South Korea	5	1	1	3	130	136	−6	3	
6	Argentina	5	0	0	5	101	147	−46	0	

Source: IHF
Rules for classification: 1) Points; 2) Head-to-head points; 3) Head-to-head goal difference; 4) Head-to-head goals scored; 5) Goal difference; 6) Goals scored; 7) Draw.

6 August 2016; 11:30	Netherlands	14–18	France	Future Arena, Rio de Janeiro; Referees: Røen, Arntsen (NOR)
6 August 2016; 11:30	three players 3	(6–10)	Lacrabère, Pineau 5	Future Arena, Rio de Janeiro; Referees: Røen, Arntsen (NOR)
6 August 2016; 11:30	3× (yellow card) 5× (suspension)	Report	3× (yellow card) 3× (suspension)	Future Arena, Rio de Janeiro; Referees: Røen, Arntsen (NOR)

8 August 2016; 19:50	Argentina	18–26	Netherlands	Future Arena, Rio de Janeiro; Referees: Mousaviyan, Kolahdouzan (IRI)
8 August 2016; 19:50	Mendoza 3	(9–13)	Polman 6	Future Arena, Rio de Janeiro; Referees: Mousaviyan, Kolahdouzan (IRI)
8 August 2016; 19:50	3× (yellow card) 5× (suspension)	Report	3× (yellow card) 10× (suspension)	Future Arena, Rio de Janeiro; Referees: Mousaviyan, Kolahdouzan (IRI)

10 August 2016; 19:50	Netherlands	32–32	South Korea	Future Arena, Rio de Janeiro; Referees: Lopéz, Ramírez (ESP)
10 August 2016; 19:50	Broch, Groot 7	(18–17)	Gwon 11	Future Arena, Rio de Janeiro; Referees: Lopéz, Ramírez (ESP)
10 August 2016; 19:50	3× (yellow card) 5× (suspension)	Report	4× (yellow card) 3× (suspension)	Future Arena, Rio de Janeiro; Referees: Lopéz, Ramírez (ESP)

12 August 2016; 11:30	Sweden	29–29	Netherlands	Future Arena, Rio de Janeiro; Referees: Alpaidze, Berekzina (RUS)
12 August 2016; 11:30	Hagman 14	(16–13)	Malestein 5	Future Arena, Rio de Janeiro; Referees: Alpaidze, Berekzina (RUS)
12 August 2016; 11:30	3× (yellow card) 3× (suspension)	Report	2× (yellow card) 1× (suspension)	Future Arena, Rio de Janeiro; Referees: Alpaidze, Berekzina (RUS)

14 August 2016; 14:40	Netherlands	34–38	Russia	Future Arena, Rio de Janeiro; Referees: Lah, Sok (SLO)
14 August 2016; 14:40	Polman 12	(16–17)	Ilina 8	Future Arena, Rio de Janeiro; Referees: Lah, Sok (SLO)
14 August 2016; 14:40	3× (yellow card) 6× (suspension)	Report	2× (yellow card) 4× (suspension)	Future Arena, Rio de Janeiro; Referees: Lah, Sok (SLO)

Quarterfinal

16 August 2016; 10:00	Brazil	23–32	Netherlands	Future Arena, Rio de Janeiro; Referees: Arntsen, Røen (NOR)
16 August 2016; 10:00	Da Silva 7	(11–12)	Polman 7	Future Arena, Rio de Janeiro; Referees: Arntsen, Røen (NOR)
16 August 2016; 10:00	4× (yellow card) 6× (suspension)	Report	3× (yellow card) 2× (suspension)	Future Arena, Rio de Janeiro; Referees: Arntsen, Røen (NOR)

Semifinal

18 August 2016; 15:30	Netherlands	23–24	France	Future Arena, Rio de Janeiro; Referees: Koo, Lee (KOR)
18 August 2016; 15:30	van der Heijden 8	(13–17)	Pineau 7	Future Arena, Rio de Janeiro; Referees: Koo, Lee (KOR)
18 August 2016; 15:30	3× (yellow card) 2× (suspension)	Report	2× (yellow card) 3× (suspension)	Future Arena, Rio de Janeiro; Referees: Koo, Lee (KOR)

Bronze medal match

20 August 2016; 11:30	Netherlands	26–36	Norway	Future Arena, Rio de Janeiro; Referees: Bonaventura, Bonaventura (FRA)
20 August 2016; 11:30	Groot 6	(13–19)	Mørk 7	Future Arena, Rio de Janeiro; Referees: Bonaventura, Bonaventura (FRA)
20 August 2016; 11:30	3× (yellow card)	Report	1× (yellow card) 1× (suspension)	Future Arena, Rio de Janeiro; Referees: Bonaventura, Bonaventura (FRA)

== Judo ==
The Netherlands has qualified a total of eleven judokas for each of the following weight classes at the Games. Six men and four women, led by two-time Olympic bronze medalist Henk Grol, were selected by virtue of their top 22 (men) and top 14 (women) finish at the IJF World Ranking List as of 30 May 2016. Meanwhile, Sanne Verhagen at women's lightweight (57 kg) earned a continental quota spot from the European region, as the highest-ranked Dutch judoka outside of direct qualifying position.

Men

Athlete	Event	Round of 64	Round of 32	Round of 16	Quarterfinals	Semifinals	Repechage	Final / BM	
Athlete	Event	Opposition Result	Opposition Result	Opposition Result	Opposition Result	Opposition Result	Opposition Result	Opposition Result	Rank
Jeroen Mooren	−60 kg	Bye	Mudranov (RUS); L 000–002	did not advance					
Dex Elmont	−73 kg	Bye	Sharipov (UZB); W 010–000	Ungvári (HUN); L 000–100	did not advance				
Frank de Wit	−81 kg	Bye	Ivanov (BUL); L 000–110	did not advance					
Noël van 't End	−90 kg	Bye	Lkhagvasüren (MGL); L 000–100	did not advance					
Henk Grol	−100 kg	Bye	Reyes (CAN); W 101–000	Maret (FRA); L 000–001	did not advance				
Roy Meyer	+100 kg	—N/a	Ngokaba (CGO); W 100–000	Kim S-m (KOR); W 101–000	Sasson (ISR); L 000–010	Did not advance	R Silva (BRA); L 000–000 S	Did not advance	7

Women

Athlete	Event	Round of 32	Round of 16	Quarterfinals	Semifinals	Repechage	Final / BM	
Athlete	Event	Opposition Result	Opposition Result	Opposition Result	Opposition Result	Opposition Result	Opposition Result	Rank
Sanne Verhagen	−57 kg	Diédhiou (SEN); W 100−000	Dorjsüren (MGL); L 000−000 S	did not advance				
Anicka van Emden	−63 kg	Valkova (RUS); W 000−000 S	Schlesinger (GBR); W 000−000 S	Agbegnenou (FRA); L 000−101	Did not advance	Unterwurzacher (AUT); W 001−000	M Silva (BRA); W 001−000	3rd place, bronze medalist(s)
Kim Polling	−70 kg	Bye	Tachimoto (JPN); L 001−002	did not advance				
Marhinde Verkerk	−78 kg	Bye	Castillo (CUB); L 000−000 S	did not advance				
Tessie Savelkouls	+78 kg	Bye	Iaromka (UKR); W 101–000	Yamabe (JPN); L 000–101	Did not advance	Kim M-j (KOR); L 000–102	Did not advance	7

== Rowing ==
The Netherlands has qualified a total of eight boats for each of the following rowing classes into the Olympic regatta. Majority of rowing crews had confirmed Olympic places for their boats at the 2015 FISA World Championships in Lac d'Aiguebelette, France, while the rowers competing in the women's lightweight double sculls and women's eight were further added to the Dutch roster as a result of their top two finish at the 2016 European & Final Qualification Regatta in Lucerne, Switzerland.

The full Dutch rowing squad for the Games was named on July 6, 2016.

Men

Athlete	Event	Heats		Repechage		Semifinals		Final	
Athlete	Event	Time	Rank	Time	Rank	Time	Rank	Time	Rank
Roel Braas; Mitchel Steenman	Pair	7:22.93	4 R	6:34.16	1 SA/B	6:26.94	4 FB	7:01.88	8
Harold Langen; Peter van Schie; Vincent van der Want; Govert Viergever	Four	6:00.55	3 SA/B	Bye		6:21.04	3 FA	6:08.38	5
Joris Pijs; Tim Heijbrock; Jort van Gennep; Björn van den Ende	Lightweight four	6:07.88	3 SA/B	Bye		6:12.87	5 FB	6:37.28	11
Dirk Uittenbogaard; Boaz Meylink; Kaj Hendriks; Boudewijn Röell; Olivier Siegelaar; Tone Wieten; Mechiel Versluis; Robert Lücken; Peter Wiersum (cox)	Eight	5:36.16	2 R	5:52.95	2 FA	—N/a		5:31.59	3rd place, bronze medalist(s)

Women

Athlete	Event	Heats		Repechage		Semifinals		Final	
Athlete	Event	Time	Rank	Time	Rank	Time	Rank	Time	Rank
Aletta Jorritsma; Karien Robbers	Pair	7:23.10	5 R	8:03.07	5 FC	—N/a		8:23.61	13
Maaike Head; Ilse Paulis	Lightweight double sculls	6:57.28	1 SA/B	Bye		7:13.93	1 FA	7:04.73	1st place, gold medalist(s)
Chantal Achterberg; Nicole Beukers; Carline Bouw; Inge Janssen	Quadruple sculls	6:38.58	3 R	6:24.61	1 FA	—N/a		6:50.33	2nd place, silver medalist(s)
Wianka van Dorp; Claudia Belderbos; Lies Rustenburg; José van Veen; Ellen Hogerwerf; Sophie Souwer; Monica Lanz; Olivia van Rooijen; Ae-Ri Noort (cox)	Eight	6:14.36	2 R	6:35.96	4 FA	—N/a		6:08.37	6

Qualification Legend: FA=Final A (medal); FB=Final B (non-medal); FC=Final C (non-medal); FD=Final D (non-medal); FE=Final E (non-medal); FF=Final F (non-medal); SA/B=Semifinals A/B; SC/D=Semifinals C/D; SE/F=Semifinals E/F; QF=Quarterfinals; R=Repechage

== Sailing ==
Dutch sailors have qualified one boat in each of the following classes through the 2014 ISAF Sailing World Championships, the individual fleet Worlds, and European qualifying regattas. Following the completion of the Princess Sofia Trophy, a total of nine sailors, highlighted by London 2012 windsurfing champion Dorian van Rijsselberghe, had been selected to the Dutch team for the Olympics. Meanwhile, 49erFX duo Annemiek Bekkering and Annette Duetz rounded out the selection to the nation's Olympic sailing team at the ISAF World Cup meet (April 26 to May 1) in Hyères, France.

Men

Athlete	Event	Race													Net points	Final rank
Athlete	Event	1	2	3	4	5	6	7	8	9	10	11	12	M*	Net points	Final rank
Dorian van Rijsselberghe	RS:X	5	3	1	4	1	1	4	1	1	1	1	~~6~~	1	25	1st place, gold medalist(s)
Rutger van Schaardenburg	Laser	3	21	~~24~~	8	1	4	22	4	21	24	—N/a		5	118	9
Pieter-Jan Postma	Finn	14	13	12	4	4	5	14	1	19	~~24~~	—N/a		9	105	10

Women

Athlete	Event	Race													Net points	Final rank
Athlete	Event	1	2	3	4	5	6	7	8	9	10	11	12	M*	Net points	Final rank
Lilian de Geus	RS:X	3	4	14	3	3	7	15	~~19~~	5	2	7	5	1	70	4
Marit Bouwmeester	Laser Radial	6	4	~~14~~	4	1	6	6	13	5	2	—N/a		7	61	1st place, gold medalist(s)
Afrodite Kyranakou; Anneloes van Veen	470	~~15~~	2	8	8	14	4	11	2	3	7	—N/a		2	63	4
Annemiek Bekkering; Annette Duetz	49erFX	~~21~~	10	12	3	8	3	5	7	13	11	3	10	6	97	7

Mixed

Athlete	Event	Race													Net points	Final rank
Athlete	Event	1	2	3	4	5	6	7	8	9	10	11	12	M*	Net points	Final rank
Coen de Koning; Mandy Mulder	Nacra 17	5	11	~~21~~	11	7	14	7	21	6	14	3	13	EL	112	14

M = Medal race; EL = Eliminated – did not advance into the medal race

== Swimming ==
A total of 17 swimmers (7 men and 10 women) were named to the Dutch roster for the Games on July 12, 2016, with sprinter Ranomi Kromowidjojo looking to defend her Olympic titles in both the women's 50 and 100 m freestyle.

Men

Athlete	Event	Heat		Semifinal		Final	
Athlete	Event	Time	Rank	Time	Rank	Time	Rank
Sebastiaan Verschuren	100 m freestyle	48.51	12 Q	48.28	10	did not advance	
Dion Dreesens	200 m freestyle	1:47.76	27	did not advance			
Sebastiaan Verschuren	200 m freestyle	1:46.32	8 Q	1:46.34	11	did not advance	
Maarten Brzoskowski	400 m freestyle	3:48.00	18	—N/a		did not advance	
Joeri Verlinden	100 m butterfly	52.48	22	did not advance			
Maarten Brzoskowski; Dion Dreesens; Ben Schwietert; Kyle Stolk; Sebastiaan Verschuren	4 × 200 m freestyle relay	7:09.16	8 Q	—N/a		7:09.10	7
Ferry Weertman	10 km open water	—N/a				1:52:59.8	1st place, gold medalist(s)

Women

Athlete	Event	Heat		Semifinal		Final	
Athlete	Event	Time	Rank	Time	Rank	Time	Rank
Inge Dekker	50 m freestyle	24.77	=13 Q	25.31	16	did not advance	
Ranomi Kromowidjojo	50 m freestyle	24.57	=8 Q	24.39	3 Q	24.19	6
Femke Heemskerk	100 m freestyle	54.63	20	did not advance			
Ranomi Kromowidjojo	100 m freestyle	53.43	4 Q	53.42	7 Q	53.08	5
Femke Heemskerk	200 m freestyle	1:57.68	15 Q	1:57.82	16	did not advance	
Robin Neumann	200 m freestyle	1:59.23	26	did not advance			
Sharon van Rouwendaal	400 m freestyle	4:11.44	19	—N/a		did not advance	
Sharon van Rouwendaal	800 m freestyle	DNS		—N/a		did not advance	
Kira Toussaint	100 m backstroke	1:01.17	18	did not advance			
Marrit Steenbergen	200 m individual medley	2:16.59	34	did not advance			
Inge Dekker; Femke Heemskerk; Ranomi Kromowidjojo; Maud van der Meer; Marrit Steenbergen	4 × 100 m freestyle relay	3:35.94	5 Q	—N/a		3:33.81	4
Femke Heemskerk; Andrea Kneppers; Robin Neumann; Marrit Steenbergen; Esmee Vermeulen	4 × 200 m freestyle relay	7:58.74	14	—N/a		did not advance	
Sharon van Rouwendaal	10 km open water	—N/a				1:56:32.1	1st place, gold medalist(s)

== Table tennis ==
Netherlands has fielded a team of three athletes into the table tennis competition at the Games. China-based player Li Jiao secured a spot in the women's singles after claiming her respective title at the 2015 European Games. Furthermore, Li Jie secured a spot in the women's singles by winning the repechage group final at the 2016 European Qualification Tournament in Halmstad, Sweden.

Britt Eerland was awarded the third spot to build the women's team for the Games by virtue of a top 10 national finish in the ITTF Olympic Rankings.

Athlete	Event	Preliminary	Round 1	Round 2	Round 3	Round of 16	Quarterfinals	Semifinals	Final / BM	
Athlete	Event	Opposition Result	Opposition Result	Opposition Result	Opposition Result	Opposition Result	Opposition Result	Opposition Result	Opposition Result	Rank
Li Jiao	Women's singles	Bye		Sawettabut (THA); W 4–2	Liu J (AUT); L 1–4	did not advance				
Li Jie	Women's singles	Bye			Li X (FRA); L 3–4	did not advance				
Britt Eerland; Li Jiao; Li Jie	Women's team	—N/a				Austria; L 1–3	did not advance			

== Taekwondo ==
Netherlands entered one athlete into the taekwondo competition at the Olympics. Reshmie Oogink secured a place in the women's heavyweight category (+67 kg) by virtue of her top two finish at the 2016 European Qualification Tournament in Istanbul, Turkey.

Athlete	Event	Round of 16	Quarterfinals	Semifinals	Repechage	Final / BM	
Athlete	Event	Opposition Result	Opposition Result	Opposition Result	Opposition Result	Opposition Result	Rank
Reshmie Oogink	Women's +67 kg	Sorn (CAM); W 7–1	Galloway (USA); L 1–1 SUP	did not advance			

== Tennis ==
The Netherlands has entered three tennis players into the Olympic tournament. After winning the Nürnberger Versicherungscup and reaching the semi-final of the French Open, Kiki Bertens (world no. 27) qualified directly for the women's singles as one of the top 56 eligible players in the WTA World Rankings, while Robin Haase did so for the men's singles based on the ATP World Rankings as of June 6, 2016.

Athlete	Event	Round of 64	Round of 32	Round of 16	Quarterfinals	Semifinals	Final / BM	
Athlete	Event	Opposition Score	Opposition Score	Opposition Score	Opposition Score	Opposition Score	Opposition Score	Rank
Robin Haase	Men's singles	Sousa (POR); L 1–6, 5–7	did not advance					
Robin Haase; Jean-Julien Rojer	Men's doubles	—N/a	López / Nadal (ESP); L 4–6, 4–6	did not advance				
Kiki Bertens	Women's singles	Errani (ITA); L 6–4, 4–6, 3–6	did not advance					
Kiki Bertens; Jean-Julien Rojer	Mixed doubles	—N/a		V Williams / Ram (USA); L 7–6^{(7–4)}, 6–7^{(3–7)}, [8–10]	did not advance			

== Triathlon ==
The Netherlands has entered one triathlete to compete at the Olympics. London 2012 Olympian Rachel Klamer was ranked among the top 40 eligible triathletes in the women's event based on the ITU Olympic Qualification List as of May 15, 2016.

Athlete	Event	Swim (1.5 km)	Trans 1	Bike (40 km)	Trans 2	Run (10 km)	Total Time	Rank
Rachel Klamer	Women's	19:10	1:00	1:01:19	0:48	36:38	1:58:55	10

== Volleyball ==
=== Beach ===
Three Dutch beach volleyball teams (two men's pairs and one women's pair) qualified directly for the Olympics by virtue of their nation's top 15 placement in the FIVB Olympic Rankings as of June 13, 2016. Among the beach volleyball players featured four-time Olympian and London 2012 fourth-place finalist Reinder Nummerdor, along with his rookie partner Christiaan Varenhorst.

Meanwhile, Sophie van Gestel and Jantine van der Vlist secured an additional women's beach volleyball place for the Games with their gold medal triumph over Ukraine at the 2016 CEV Continental Cup in Stavanger, Norway.

Athlete	Event	Preliminary round	Standing	Round of 16	Quarterfinals	Semifinals	Final / BM	
Athlete	Event	Opposition Score	Standing	Opposition Score	Opposition Score	Opposition Score	Opposition Score	Rank
Alexander Brouwer; Robert Meeuwsen	Men's	Pool B Barsouk – Liamin (RUS); W 2 – 0 (21–15, 21–14); Böckermann – Flüggen (GER); W 2 – 1 (21–19, 17–21, 16–14); Kantor – Łosiak (POL); W 2 – 0 (21–19, 21–19)	1 Q	Saxton – Schalk (CAN); W 2 – 0 (21–12, 21–15)	Nummerdor – Varenhorst (NED); W 2 – 0 (25–23, 21–17)	Alison – Bruno Schmidt (BRA); L 1 – 2 (17–21, 23–21, 16–14)	Krasilnikov – Semenov (RUS); W 2 – 0 (23–21, 22–20)	3rd place, bronze medalist(s)
Reinder Nummerdor; Christiaan Varenhorst	Men's	Pool E E. Grimalt – M. Grimalt (CHI); W 2 – 0 (21–16, 21–13); Fijałek – Prudel (POL); W 2 – 1 (21–17, 19–21, 15–9); Krasilnikov – Semenov (RUS); L 1 – 2 (15–21, 21–14, 9–15)	2 Q	Ontiveros – Virgen (MEX); W 2 – 0 (21–18, 21–15)	Brouwer – Meeuwsen (NED); L 0 – 2 (23–25, 17–21)	did not advance		
Marleen van Iersel; Madelein Meppelink	Women's	Pool F Agudo – Pérez (VEN); W 2 – 0 (21–17, 21–11); Alfaro – Charles (CRC); W 2 – 0 (21–16, 21–16); Bawden – Clancy (AUS); L 1 – 2 (25–27, 21–18, 14–16)	2 Q	Heidrich – Zumkehr (SUI); L 1 – 2 (21–19, 13–21, 10–15)	did not advance			
Sophie van Gestel; Jantine van der Vlist	Women's	Pool E Bansley – Pavan (CAN); L 0 – 2 (15–21, 17–21); Borger – Büthe (GER); L 0 – 2 (19–21, 14–21); Heidrich – Zumkehr (SUI); L 1 – 2 (21–17, 11–21, 8–15)	4	did not advance				

=== Indoor ===
==== Women's tournament ====
The Netherlands women's volleyball team qualified for the Olympics by virtue of a top three national finish at the first meet of the World Olympic Qualifying Tournament in Tokyo, Japan, signifying the team's Olympic comeback for the first time since 1996.

Summary

Team	Event	Group stage						Quarterfinals	Semifinals	Final / BM	
Team	Event	Opposition Score	Opposition Score	Opposition Score	Opposition Score	Opposition Score	Rank	Opposition Score	Opposition Score	Opposition Score	Rank
Netherlands women's	Women's tournament	China; W 2–3	United States; L 3–2	Italy; W 0–3	Puerto Rico; W 3–0	Serbia; W 2–3	2 Q	South Korea; W 1–3	China; L 3–1	United States; L 3–1	4

Team roster

The following is the Dutch roster in the women's volleyball tournament of the 2016 Summer Olympics.

Head coach: (Italy) Giovanni Guidetti

No.	Name	Date of birth	Height	Weight	Spike	Block	2015–16 club
2	Femke Stoltenborg	30 July 1991	1.90 m (6 ft 3 in)	81 kg (179 lb)	303 cm (119 in)	299 cm (118 in)	(Germany) MTV Stuttgart
3	Yvon Beliën	28 December 1993	1.88 m (6 ft 2 in)	73 kg (161 lb)	307 cm (121 in)	303 cm (119 in)	(Italy) River Volley Piacenza
4	Celeste Plak	26 October 1995	1.90 m (6 ft 3 in)	87 kg (192 lb)	314 cm (124 in)	302 cm (119 in)	(Italy) Volley Bergamo
5	Robin de Kruijf	5 May 1991	1.93 m (6 ft 4 in)	81 kg (179 lb)	313 cm (123 in)	300 cm (120 in)	(Turkey) VakifBank Istanbul
6	Maret Balkestein-Grothues (c)	16 September 1988	1.80 m (5 ft 11 in)	68 kg (150 lb)	304 cm (120 in)	285 cm (112 in)	(Poland) Atom Trefl Sopot
7	Quinta Steenbergen	2 April 1985	1.89 m (6 ft 2 in)	75 kg (165 lb)	309 cm (122 in)	300 cm (120 in)	(Czech Republic) VK Prostějov
8	Judith Pietersen	3 July 1989	1.88 m (6 ft 2 in)	73 kg (161 lb)	306 cm (120 in)	296 cm (117 in)	(Italy) Pallavolo Scandicci
9	Myrthe Schoot (L)	29 August 1988	1.84 m (6 ft 0 in)	70 kg (150 lb)	298 cm (117 in)	286 cm (113 in)	(Germany) Dresdner SC
10	Lonneke Slöetjes	15 November 1990	1.92 m (6 ft 4 in)	76 kg (168 lb)	322 cm (127 in)	315 cm (124 in)	(Turkey) VakifBank Istanbul
11	Anne Buijs	2 December 1991	1.91 m (6 ft 3 in)	73 kg (161 lb)	317 cm (125 in)	299 cm (118 in)	(Turkey) VakifBank Istanbul
14	Laura Dijkema	18 February 1990	1.84 m (6 ft 0 in)	70 kg (150 lb)	293 cm (115 in)	279 cm (110 in)	(Germany) Dresdner SC
16	Debby Stam	24 July 1984	1.84 m (6 ft 0 in)	69 kg (152 lb)	303 cm (119 in)	281 cm (111 in)	(France) Rocheville Le Cannet

Group play

Pos	Team	Pld	W	L	Pts	SW	SL	SR	SPW	SPL	SPR	Qualification
1	United States	5	5	0	14	15	5	3.000	470	400	1.175	Quarter-finals
2	Netherlands	5	4	1	11	14	7	2.000	455	425	1.071	Quarter-finals
3	Serbia	5	3	2	10	12	6	2.000	410	394	1.041	Quarter-finals
4	China	5	2	3	7	9	9	1.000	398	389	1.023	Quarter-finals
5	Italy	5	1	4	3	4	12	0.333	351	374	0.939	
6	Puerto Rico	5	0	5	0	0	15	0.000	277	379	0.731	

Source: FIVB
Rules for classification: Tiebreakers

6 August 2016; 11:35	China	2–3	Netherlands	Ginásio do Maracanãzinho, Rio de Janeiro; Attendance: 6,410; Referees: Susana Rodríguez (ESP), Paulo Turci (BRA)
6 August 2016; 11:35	(23–25, 25–21, 25–18, 22–25, 13–15); Result Statistics			Ginásio do Maracanãzinho, Rio de Janeiro; Attendance: 6,410; Referees: Susana Rodríguez (ESP), Paulo Turci (BRA)

8 August 2016; 15:00	United States	3–2	Netherlands	Ginásio do Maracanãzinho, Rio de Janeiro; Attendance: 5,455; Referees: Mohammad Shahmiri (IRI), Juraj Mokrý (SVK)
8 August 2016; 15:00	(18–25, 25–18, 21–25, 25–20, 15–8); Result Statistics			Ginásio do Maracanãzinho, Rio de Janeiro; Attendance: 5,455; Referees: Mohammad Shahmiri (IRI), Juraj Mokrý (SVK)

10 August 2016; 11:35	Italy	0–3	Netherlands	Ginásio do Maracanãzinho, Rio de Janeiro; Attendance: 5,539; Referees: Juraj Mokrý (SVK), Nasr Shaaban (EGY)
10 August 2016; 11:35	(21–25, 20–25, 20–25); Result Statistics			Ginásio do Maracanãzinho, Rio de Janeiro; Attendance: 5,539; Referees: Juraj Mokrý (SVK), Nasr Shaaban (EGY)

12 August 2016; 17:05	Netherlands	3–0	Puerto Rico	Ginásio do Maracanãzinho, Rio de Janeiro; Attendance: 6,742; Referees: Ibrahim Al-Naama (QAT), Hernán Casamiquela (ARG)
12 August 2016; 17:05	(25–14, 25–22, 25–16); Result Statistics			Ginásio do Maracanãzinho, Rio de Janeiro; Attendance: 6,742; Referees: Ibrahim Al-Naama (QAT), Hernán Casamiquela (ARG)

14 August 2016; 09:30	Serbia	2–3	Netherlands	Ginásio do Maracanãzinho, Rio de Janeiro; Attendance: 6,387; Referees: Susana Rodríguez (ESP), Andrey Zenovich (RUS)
14 August 2016; 09:30	(22–25, 20–25, 25–22, 25–18, 8–15); Result Statistics			Ginásio do Maracanãzinho, Rio de Janeiro; Attendance: 6,387; Referees: Susana Rodríguez (ESP), Andrey Zenovich (RUS)

Quarterfinal

16 August 2016; 10:00	South Korea	1–3	Netherlands	Ginásio do Maracanãzinho, Rio de Janeiro; Attendance: 6,351; Referees: Patricia Rolf (USA), Nasr Shaaban (EGY)
16 August 2016; 10:00	(19–25, 14–25, 25–23, 20–25); Result Statistics			Ginásio do Maracanãzinho, Rio de Janeiro; Attendance: 6,351; Referees: Patricia Rolf (USA), Nasr Shaaban (EGY)

Semifinal

18 August 2016; 22:15	China	3–1	Netherlands	Ginásio do Maracanãzinho, Rio de Janeiro; Attendance: 8,411; Referees: Luis Macias (MEX), Fabrizio Pasquali (ITA)
18 August 2016; 22:15	(27–25, 23–25, 29–27, 25–23); Result Statistics			Ginásio do Maracanãzinho, Rio de Janeiro; Attendance: 8,411; Referees: Luis Macias (MEX), Fabrizio Pasquali (ITA)

Bronze medal match

20 August 2016; 13:00	Netherlands	1–3	United States	Ginásio do Maracanãzinho, Rio de Janeiro; Attendance: 7,897; Referees: Paulo Turci (BRA), Piotr Dudek (POL)
20 August 2016; 13:00	(23–25, 27–25, 22–25, 19–25); Result Statistics			Ginásio do Maracanãzinho, Rio de Janeiro; Attendance: 7,897; Referees: Paulo Turci (BRA), Piotr Dudek (POL)

== Wrestling ==
The Netherlands has qualified one wrestler for the women's freestyle 48 kg into the Olympic competition, as a result of her top six finish at the 2015 World Championships, signifying the nation's Olympic return to the sport for the first time since 2000.

Key:

- VT – Victory by Fall.
- PP – Decision by Points – the loser with technical points.
- PO – Decision by Points – the loser without technical points.
- ST – Decision by points – the loser without technical points and a margin of victory of at least 8 (Greco-Roman) or 10 (freestyle) points.

Women's freestyle

Athlete	Event	Qualification	Round of 16	Quarterfinal	Semifinal	Repechage 1	Repechage 2	Final / BM	
Athlete	Event	Opposition Result	Opposition Result	Opposition Result	Opposition Result	Opposition Result	Opposition Result	Opposition Result	Rank
Jessica Blaszka	−48 kg	Bye	Augello (USA); L 0–3 ^{PO}	did not advance					15

== See also ==
- Netherlands at the 2016 Summer Paralympics
