= 2011 World Rowing Junior Championships =

- Venue: Dorney Lake
- Location: Dorney, Great Britain
- Dates: 3–7 August

The 45th World Rowing Junior Championships were held from 3 to 7 August 2011 at Dorney Lake, Dorney, Great Britain.

== Medal summary ==
=== Men's events ===
Event	Gold		Silver		Bronze	
Single scull (JM1x)	Stephan Riemekasten; Germany	7:03.41	Alexandros Dafnis; Greece	7:05.42	Andrii Mykhailov; Ukraine	7:05.78
Coxless pair (JM2-)	Romania; Vlad Dragoș Aicoboae; Toader-Andrei Gontaru	6:50.49	Spain; Álvaro Romero García; Alejandro Fernández Lomba	6:51.83	Greece; Konstantinos Christomanos; Alexandros Louloudis	6:53.10
Double scull (JM2x)	Germany; Kai Fuhrmann; Denis Sittel	6:33.66	France; Hugo Boucheron; Albéric Cormerais	6:36.65	Czech Republic; Adam Sterbak; Martin Slavík	6:40.36
Coxless four (JM4-)	Germany; Maximilian Johanning; Johannes Weißenfeld; Malte Jakschik; Lukas-Frederik Müller	6:04.49	Spain; Marco Sardelli Gil; Sergio Garcia Sanjulian; Pau Franquet Monfort; Jaime Lara Pacheco	6:06.73	Romania; Dumitru Mariuc; Vasile Agafiței; Bogdanel-Nicolaie Ivan; Neculai Aniculesei	6:07.00
Coxed four (JM4+)	Australia; Philip Adams; Aaron Wright; Louis Snelson; Alexander Hill; Stuart Sim (cox)	6:21.79	New Zealand; Gregory Brand; Louis Van Velthooven; Adam Smith; Andrew Potter; Caleb Shepherd (cox)	6:23.10	Italy; Nicholas Brezzi; Mario Cuomo; Dario Duchich; Vincenzo Abbagnale; Dario Favilli (cox)	6:23.67
Quad scull (JM4x)	Romania; Ioan Prundeanu; Ionut Luca; Adrian Cionca; Cosmin-Ilie Cuciurean	6:01.62	Italy; Marco Chiodelli; Luca Rambaldi; Marco Ferracci; Marco Calamaro	6:03.22	Germany; Maximilian Schäfer; Ole Daberkow; Finn Schröder; René Stüven	6:03.96
Eight (JM8+)	Italy; Guglielmo Carcano; Marco Marcelli; Bernardo Nannini; Leone Barbaro; Giovanni Abagnale; Pietro Zileri; Matteo Lodo; Giuseppe Vicino; Enrico D'Aniello (cox)	5:41.83	Great Britain; Robert Wickstead; Alexander Lloyd; Eduardo Munno; Jamie Copus; John Carter; Frederic Vystavel; Luke Briggs; Cameron MacRitchie; Ed Bosson (cox)	5:44.54	Germany; Jan Bernhard; Jakob Kaltenbach; Daniel Walter; Dirk Fleßner; Moritz Bock; Nico Merget; Oliver Mittelstädt; Finn Knüppel; Leopold Bertz (cox)	5:46.04

=== Women's events ===
Event	Gold		Silver		Bronze	
JW1x	Anne Beenken; Germany	7:58.00	Holly Nixon; Ireland	7:59.56	Elza Gulbe; Latvia	8:02.62
JW2-	Italy; Serena Lo Bue; Giorgia Lo Bue	7:25.38	Germany; Michelle Lauer; Lena Klemm	7:29.58	Greece; Vasiliki Ntalamagka; Eleni Diamanti	7:29.79
JW2x	Lithuania; Milda Valčiukaitė; Ieva Adomavičiūtė	7:17.87	Germany; Julia Leiding; Constanze Sydow	7:19.35	France; Élodie Ravera-Scaramozzino; Daphné Socha	7:20.10
JW4-	United States; Jessica Eiffert; Mia Croonquist; Lucy Grinalds; Chandler Lally	6:48.77	Great Britain; Elizabeth Horne; Nicole Lamb; Anastasia Posner; Amber de Vere	6:50.53	New Zealand; Catherine Shields; Alice White; Frederika Archibald; Grace Spoors	6:51.36
JW4x	Germany; Franziska Kreutzer; Anne Marie Kroll; Rona Schulz; Shirin Brockmann	6:31.07	Netherlands; Karien Robbers; Anne Fischer; Kirsten Lanz; Ilse Paulis	6:34.48	Romania; Ioana Vrînceanu; Isabela-Mihaela Solomon; Ionela-Madalina Rusu; Laura Oprea	6:35.23
JW8+	Germany; Marie Uhlig; Elisaveta Sokolkova; Anne Dietrich; Juliane Bosse; Sophia Wüllner; Marisa Staelberg; Mara Kölker; Nadine Seehaus; Deborah Walther (cox)	6:20.16	Romania; Dana-Adina Szekely; Florentina Filipovici; Ana-Maria Simion; Ana-Maria Aftode; Andreea Birica; Madalina Buzdugan; Elena Lavinia Târlea; Viviana Iuliana Bejinariu; Georgiana Danciu (cox)	6:23.66	United States; Deirdre Fitzpatrick; Katherine Toothman; Logan Harris; Caitlin Byrnes; Georgia Ratcliff; Madeleine Wolf; Charlotte Passot; Abigayle Young; Christine Devlin (cox)	6:32.28

== See also ==
- 2011 World Rowing Championships
- 2011 World Rowing U23 Championships
