= Benjamin Lang =

Benjamin Lang may refer to:

- Benjamin Johnson Lang (1837–1909), American musician
- Benjamin Lang (rower) (born 1987), French rower
