= Toader =

Toader is a Romanian name that may refer to:

== Surname ==
- Adrian Toader (born 1973), Romanian football striker
- Andrei Toader (born 1997), Romanian athlete
- Leontin Toader (born 1964), Romanian football goalkeeper
- Lucia Toader (1960–2013), Romanian rower
- Marcel Toader (1963–2019), Romanian rugby union player, businessman, and media personality
- Tudorel Toader (born 1960), Romanian lawyer and professor

== Given name ==
- Toader-Andrei Gontaru (born 1993), Romanian rower
- Toader Arăpaşu (1915–2007), patriarch of the Romanian Orthodox Church
