= Van Schie =

Van Schie is a Dutch toponymic surname meaning "from Schie", a canalized river between Delft and Schiedam. People with this name include:

- Lia van Schie (born 1970), Dutch speed skater
- Matt Van Schie, Australian bass guitarist, singer and namesake of the band Van She
- Peter van Schie (born 1988), Dutch rower
- Tjako van Schie (born 1961), Dutch pianist and composer
