= Vlad Dragoș Aicoboae =

Romanian rower

Personal information
- Born: 10 October 1993 (age 32) Dorohoi, Romania

Sport
- Country: Romania
- Sport: Rowing
Medal record
Men's rowing
Representing Romania
World Junior Championships
Gold medal – first place	2011 Dorney	Double sculls
European Championships
Silver medal – second place	2020 Poznań	Eight
Silver medal – second place	2021 Varese	Eight
Bronze medal – third place	2018 Glasgow	Eight

Vlad Dragoș Aicoboae (born 10 October 1993) is a Romanian rower. He competed in the men's coxless four event at the 2016 Summer Olympics.

== Career ==
At the age of 17, he has started canoeing, after he quit handball. His first important result with his first international participation. In 2010, at the World Junior Championships, the four-man squadron crew (Toader-Andrei Gontaru, Marius Vasile Cozmiuc and Cosmin Răzvan Bogus) won the gold medal. In 2011, at the Junior World Championships in Eton, Berkshire, England, the two-man squadron crew won the highest podium rate.

In 2014, the four-man squadron crew consisting of Aicoboae, Gontaru, Cozmiuc and Adrian Damii won the bronze medal at the U23 World Championships held in Varese, Italy. In 2015, at the World Cup, held in Lucerne, Switzerland, the same crew won the third place.
