= Dionisis Angelopoulos =

Greek rower (born 1992)

Personal information
- Nationality: Greek
- Born: 5 August 1992
- Height: 189 cm (6 ft 2 in)
- Weight: 91 kg (201 lb)

Sport
- Country: Greece
- Sport: Rowing

Dionisis Angelopoulos (born 5 August 1992) is a Greek rower. He competed at the 2016 Summer Olympics in the men's coxless four. The Greek team finished in 8th place.
