= Matthew Miller (rower) =

American rower

Personal information
- Born: January 13, 1989 (age 37)

Sport
- Sport: Rowing

Matthew Miller (born January 13, 1989) is an American rower. He competed in the men's coxless four event at the 2016 Summer Olympics.
