= Anton Zarutskiy =

Russian rower

Personal information
- Born: 27 April 1986 (age 40) Moscow, Russian SFSR, Soviet Union

Sport
- Sport: Rowing

Anton Zarutskiy (born 27 April 1986) is a Russian rower. He competed in the men's coxless four event at the 2016 Summer Olympics.
