= Seth Weil =

American rower

Personal information
- Born: March 9, 1987 (age 39)
- Height: 6 ft 9 in (206 cm)

Sport
- Sport: Rowing

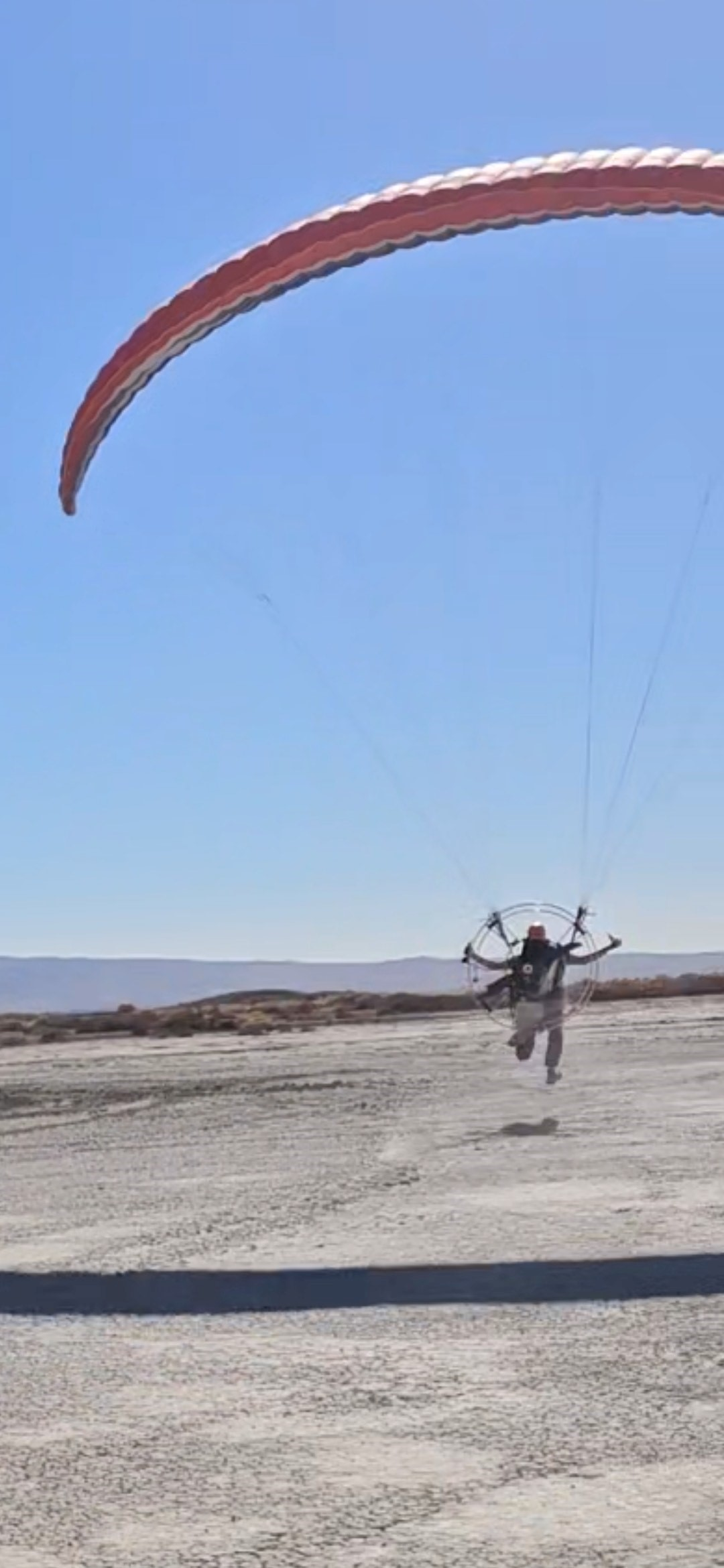

Seth Weil (born March 9, 1987) is an American rower from the San Francisco Bay Area. He was named USRowing Male Athlete of the Year in 2015. He competed in the men's coxless four event at the 2016 Summer Olympics.

He discovered rowing his freshman year at University of California, Davis.
