= Anton Braun =

German rower

Personal information
- Born: 28 April 1990 (age 36) Berlin, Germany
- Height: 2.02 m (6 ft 8 in)
- Weight: 104 kg (229 lb)

Sport
- Country: Germany
- Sport: Rowing
- Event: Men's pair
- Club: Berliner RC
Medal record
World Championships
Silver medal – second place	2013 Chungju	M8+
Silver medal – second place	2015 Aiguebelette	M8+
European Championships
Gold medal – first place	2013 Seville	M8+
Gold medal – first place	2015 Poznan	M8+
Bronze medal – third place	2014 Belgrade	M2−

Anton Braun (born 28 April 1990) is a German rower. He competed at the 2012 Summer Olympics in London in the Men's Pair event together with his teammate Felix Drahotta. They finished first in the B finals, earning them seventh place overall. At the 2016 Summer Olympics in Rio de Janeiro, he competed in the men's coxless four. The German team finished in 12th place.

Braun man his international debut in 2008, and his senior international debut in 2010.

In 2008, he was part of German junior men's 4 that won the bronze medal at the Junior World Championships. The year after he was part of the German men's four that won bronze at the U-23 World Championship. In 2010, Braun was part of the men's eight that won the U-23 World Championship. In 2011, Braun and Bastian Bechler won bronze in the men's pair at the U-23 World Championship.

In senior competition, Braun was part of the German men's eight who won the European Championship in 2013. That year, the team also came second at the World Championships. In 2014, Braun and Bechler won the bronze medal in the men's pair at the European Championships. In 2015, Braun was part of the German men's eight that won the European Championships and came second at the World Championships.
