= Mickaël Marteau =

French rower

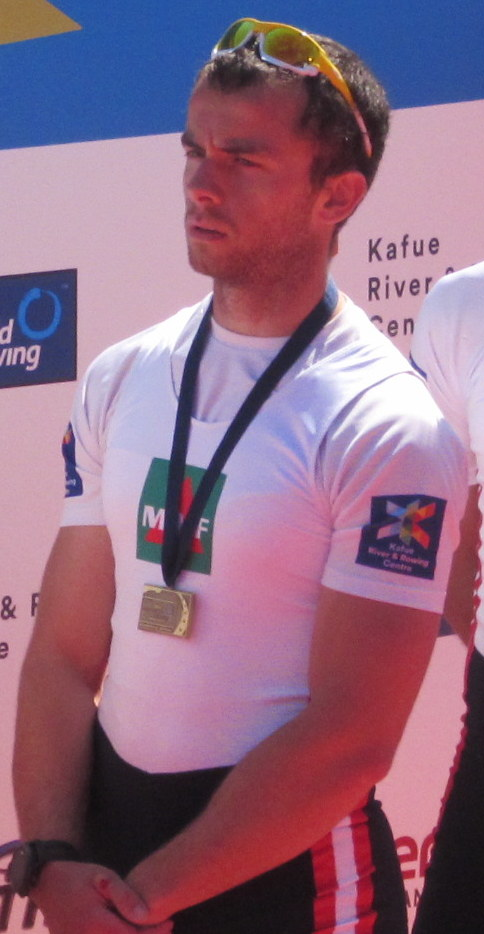

Personal information
- Born: 28 September 1992 (age 34)

Sport
- Sport: Rowing

Mickaël Marteau (born 28 September 1992) is a French rower. He competed in the men's coxless four event at the 2016 Summer Olympics.
