= Jonty Smith =

South African rower

Personal information
- Nationality: South African
- Born: 19 February 1992 (age 34)
- Height: 195 cm (6 ft 5 in)
- Weight: 96 kg (212 lb)

Sport
- Country: South Africa
- Sport: Rowing

Jonathan Alan "Jonty" Smith (born 19 February 1992) is a South African competitive rower.

He competed at the 2016 Summer Olympics in Rio de Janeiro, in the men's coxless four. The South African team finished in 4th place.
