= Maximilian Korge =

German rower (born 1994)

Personal information
- Nationality: German
- Born: 12 October 1994 (age 31)
- Height: 193 cm (6 ft 4 in)
- Weight: 92 kg (203 lb)

Sport
- Sport: Rowing

Maximilian Korge (born 12 October 1994) is a German rower. He competed in the men's coxless four event at the 2016 Summer Olympics.
