= Vincent Breet =

South African rower

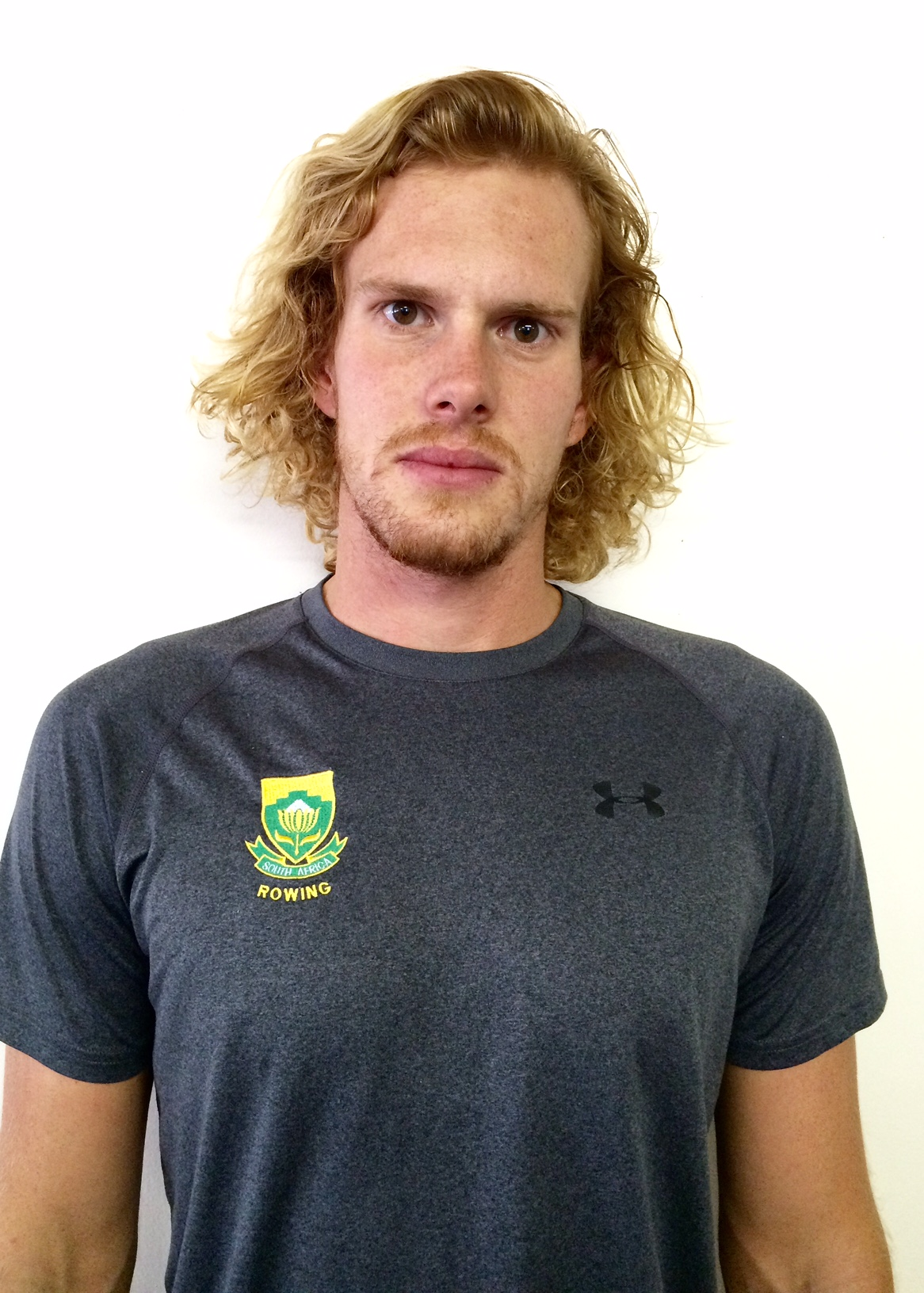
- Breet in 2016

Personal information
- Nickname: Monty
- Nationality: South African
- Born: Vincent Breet; 26 April 1993 (age 33) Johannesburg
- Height: 195 cm (6 ft 5 in)
- Weight: 92 kg (203 lb)

Sport
- Country: South Africa
- Sport: Rowing
- College team: Harvard Heavyweight Crew
- Club: Tuks, Pretoria
Medal record
Representing South Africa
World Championships
Bronze medal – third place	2014 Amsterdam	Coxless pair

Vincent Breet (born 26 April 1993) is a South African competitive rower.

He competed at the 2016 Summer Olympics in Rio de Janeiro, in the men's coxless four. The South African team finished in 4th place.
