= Ioannis Tsilis =

Greek rower (born 1986)

Medal record

Representing Greece

Men's rowing

World Championships
Silver medal – second place	2010 Karapiro	M4-
Silver medal – second place	2011 Bled	M4-

European Championships
Gold medal – first place	2008 Marathon	M4-
Gold medal – first place	2011 Plovdiv	M4-
Silver medal – second place	2010 Montemor-o-Velho	M4-
Silver medal – second place	2014 Belgrade	M4-
Silver medal – second place	2015 Poznań	M4-
Bronze medal – third place	2007 Poznań	M4-

Ioannis Tsilis (Greek: Ιωάννης Τσίλης; born 15 July 1986 in Ioannina) is a Greek rower. He competed at the 2012 Summer Olympics in the men's four, finishing in 4th place.

He was again part of the Greek coxless men's four team at the 2016 Summer Olympics, taking eighth place.
