= Domenico Montrone =

Italian rower

Personal information
- Nationality: Italian
- Born: 1 May 1986 (age 40)
- Height: 1.89 m (6 ft 2 in)
- Weight: 97 kg (214 lb)

Sport
- Country: Italy
- Sport: Rowing
- Club: Fiamme Gialle
Medal record
Men's rowing
Representing Italy
Olympic Games
Bronze medal – third place	2016 Rio de Janeiro	Coxless four
World Championships
Silver medal – second place	2017 Sarasota	Coxless four
European Championships
Gold medal – first place	2017 Račice	Coxless four
Silver medal – second place	2008 Athens	Coxless four

Domenico Montrone (born 1 May 1986) is an Italian rower. He represented his country at the 2016 Summer Olympics, where he won the bronze medal in the coxless four event. He won a silver medal at the 2017 World Rowing Championships in the coxless four.
