= Ihar Pashevich =

Belarusian rower (born 1991)

Personal information
- Born: 8 December 1991 (age 34)
- Height: 194 cm (6 ft 4 in)
- Weight: 87 kg (192 lb)
Medal record
Men's rowing
Representing Belarus
European Championships
Silver medal – second place	2016 Brandenbrug	M4-
Bronze medal – third place	2015 Poznan	M4-

Ihar Pashevich (born 8 December 1991) is a Belarusian rower. He won the silver medal in the coxless four at the 2016 European Rowing Championships. He also competed in rowing at the 2016 Summer Olympics.
