= David Hunt (rower) =

South African rower

Personal information
- Nationality: South African
- Born: 1 February 1991 (age 35)
- Height: 197 cm (6 ft 6 in)
- Weight: 90 kg (198 lb)

Sport
- Country: South Africa
- Sport: Rowing

David Hunt (born 1 February 1991) is a South African competitive rower.

He competed at the 2016 Summer Olympics in Rio de Janeiro, in the men's coxless four. The South African team finished in 4th place.
