= Alex Kennedy (rower) =

New Zealand rower

Personal information
- Nationality: New Zealand
- Born: 13 October 1992 (age 33)
- Height: 195 cm (6 ft 5 in)
- Weight: 95 kg (209 lb)

Alex Kennedy (born 13 October 1992) is a New Zealand rower. He came fourth at the 2015 World Rowing Championships with the men's eight, qualifying the boat for the 2016 Olympics.
