= Matteo Lodo =

Italian rower (born 1994)

Personal information
- Born: 25 October 1994 (age 31) Terracina, Italy

Sport
- Club: Fiamme Gialle
Medal record
Men's rowing
Representing Italy
Olympic Games
Bronze medal – third place	2016 Rio de Janeiro	Coxless four
Bronze medal – third place	2020 Tokyo	Coxless four
World Championships
Gold medal – first place	2015 Aiguebelette-le-lac	Coxless four
Gold medal – first place	2017 Sarasota	Coxless pair
Silver medal – second place	2018 Plovdiv	Coxless four
Bronze medal – third place	2026 Amsterdam	Coxless pair
European Championships
Gold medal – first place	2017 Račice	Coxless pair
Silver medal – second place	2024 Szeged	Coxless four
Bronze medal – third place	2020 Poznań	Coxless pair
Bronze medal – third place	2022 Oberschleißheim	Eight
Bronze medal – third place	2026 Varese	Coxless pair

Matteo Lodo (born 25 October 1994) is an Italian rower. He won the bronze medal in the coxless four at the 2016 Summer Olympics and at the 2020 Summer Olympics, and the gold medal at the 2015 World Rowing Championships and at the 2017 World Rowing Championships, in the coxless four and in the coxless pair respectively.
