= Benjamin Lang (rower) =

French rower

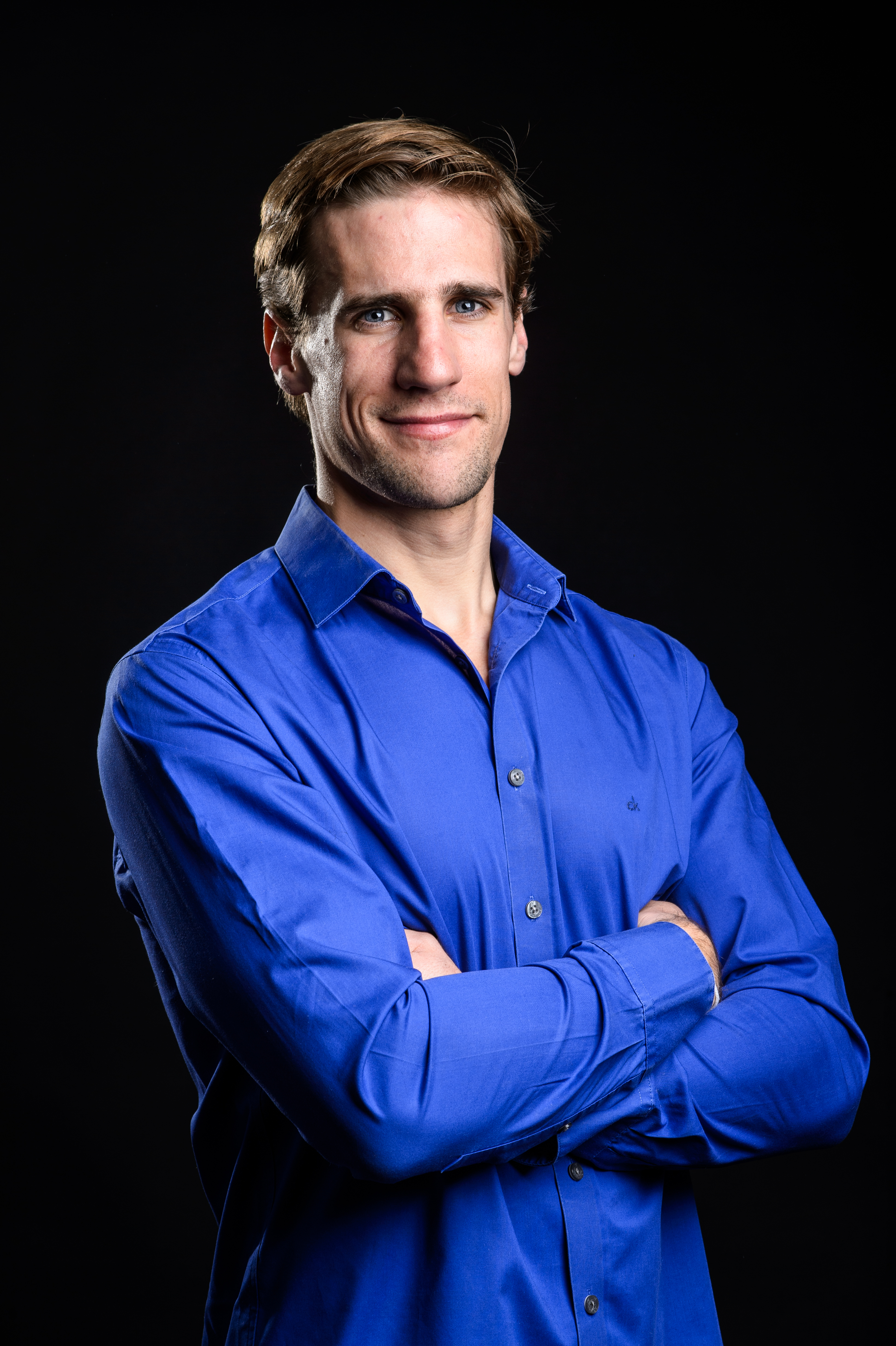

Personal information
- Born: 4 February 1987 (age 39)

Sport
- Sport: Rowing

Benjamin Lang (born 4 February 1987) is a French rower. He competed in the men's coxless four event at the 2016 Summer Olympics. His first club was the Emulation Nautique de Bordeaux, which he joined in 1997 and remains a member of their steering committee.

Lang won silver medals in the coxed pair at both the 2008 and 2012 World Rowing Championships.
