= Giuseppe Vicino =

Italian rower (born 1993)

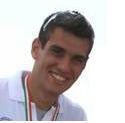
- Giuseppe Vicino in 2013

Personal information
- Born: 26 February 1993 (age 33) Naples, Italy

Sport
- Club: Fiamme Gialle
Medal record
Men's rowing
Representing Italy
Olympic Games
Bronze medal – third place	2016 Rio de Janeiro	Coxless four
Bronze medal – third place	2020 Tokyo	Coxless four
World Championships
Gold medal – first place	2015 Aiguebelette-le-lac	Coxless four
Gold medal – first place	2017 Sarasota	Coxless pair
European Championships
Gold medal – first place	2017 Račice	Coxless pair
Silver medal – second place	2012 Varese	Eight
Silver medal – second place	2024 Szeged	Coxless four
Bronze medal – third place	2014 Belgrade	Coxless four
Bronze medal – third place	2020 Poznań	Coxless pair
Bronze medal – third place	2022 Oberschleißheim	Eight
Bronze medal – third place	2026 Varese	Eight

Giuseppe Vicino (born 26 February 1993) is an Italian rower. He won the bronze medal in the coxless four, at the Tokyo 2020 Olympic Games.

He won the gold medal in the coxless four at the 2015 World Rowing Championships.

== Biography ==
Giuseppe started his rowing career in 2005 at Circolo del Remo e della Vela Italia in Naples. In 2010, at the Junior World Championships in Racice he won bronze in the men's eight. In 2013 he joined the Fiamme Gialle rowing club.
