= Nikita Morgachyov =

Russian rower

Personal information
- Born: 3 May 1981 (age 45) Moscow, Russia
- Height: 194 cm (6 ft 4 in)
- Weight: 94 kg (207 lb)

Sport
- Sport: Rowing
- Club: Krasnyi Oktyabr
Medal record
Representing Russia
European Championships
Gold medal – first place	2007 Poznań	M4x
Silver medal – second place	2014 Belgrade	M8+
Bronze medal – third place	2014 Poznan	M8+

Nikita Andreyevich Morgachyov (Russian: Никита Андреевич Моргачёв, born 3 May 1981) is a Russian rower. Competing in the quadruple sculls he won the 2007 European title and placed seventh-eighth at the 2008 and 2012 Olympics. He was disqualified from the 2016 Games after his teammate Sergey Fedorovtsev failed a drug test in 2016. Morgachyov won two more medals at the 2014–2015 European championships in the eighth. He was removed from the squad for the 2020 Olympics after failing a drugs test.
