= Mikalai Sharlap =

Belarusian rower

Personal information
- Born: 30 March 1994 (age 32)
Medal record
Men's rowing
Representing Belarus
European Championships
Silver medal – second place	2016 Brandenbrug	M4-
Bronze medal – third place	2015 Poznan	M4-

Mikalai Sharlap (born 30 March 1994) is a Belarusian rower. He won the silver medal in the coxless four at the 2016 European Rowing Championships. He competed in the coxless fours at the 2016 Summer Olympics, coming in ninth.
