= Peter van Schie =

Dutch rower

Personal information
- Born: 3 March 1988 (age 38)

Sport
- Sport: Rowing

Peter van Schie (born 3 March 1988) is a Dutch rower. He competed in the men's coxless four event at the 2016 Summer Olympics.
