= Toader-Andrei Gontaru =

Romanian rower

Personal information
- Born: 7 February 1993 (age 33)

Sport
- Sport: Rowing
Medal record
Men's rowing
Representing Romania
World Junior Championships
Gold medal – first place	2011 Dorney	Double sculls

Toader-Andrei Gontaru (born 7 February 1993) is a Romanian rower. He competed in the men's coxless four event at the 2016 Summer Olympics.
