= Karien Robbers =

Dutch rower

Personal information
- Born: 16 August 1993 (age 32)

Sport
- Sport: Rowing

Karien Robbers (born 16 August 1993) is a Dutch rower. She competed in the women's coxless pair event at the 2016 Summer Olympics.
