= Jake Green (rower) =

South African rower

Personal information
- Born: 30 March 1994 (age 32) South Africa
- Height: 192 cm (6 ft 4 in)
- Weight: 90 kg (198 lb)

Sport
- Sport: Rowing

Jake Milton Green (born 30 March 1994) is a South African rower.

Green attended St. Andrew's College, Grahamstown and Pretoria University. In May 2016, Green was selected to represent South Africa at the 2016 Summer Olympics. The South African team almost came in 3rd place but finished in 4th place.

He competed in the men's pair with Luc Daffarn at the 2020 Summer Olympics.
