= Govert Viergever =

Dutch rower

Personal information
- Born: 29 July 1989 (age 36) Amsterdam, Netherlands
- Height: 184 cm (6 ft 0 in)
- Weight: 85 kg (187 lb)
Medal record
Men's rowing
Representing Netherlands
European Championships
Bronze medal – third place	2013 Sevilla	Eight

Govert Viergever (born 29 July 1989) is a Dutch rower. He competed in the men's coxless four event at the 2016 Summer Olympics.
