= Harold Langen =

Dutch rower

Personal information
- Born: 27 October 1986 (age 39) Maastricht
- Height: 188 cm (6 ft 2 in)
- Weight: 90 kg (198 lb)

Sport
- Sport: Rowing

Harold Langen (born 27 October 1986) is a Dutch rower. He competed in the men's coxless four event at the 2016 Summer Olympics.
