= Vincent van der Want =

Dutch rower

Personal information
- Born: 21 October 1985 (age 40) Hilversum, Noord-Holland
- Height: 198 cm (6 ft 6 in)
- Weight: 90 kg (198 lb)

Sport
- Sport: Rowing
Medal record
Men's rowing
Representing the Netherlands
European Championships
Silver medal – second place	2018 Glasgow	Eight
Bronze medal – third place	2013 Seville	Eight
Bronze medal – third place	2019 Lucerne	Eight

Vincent van der Want (born 21 October 1985) is a Dutch rower. He competed in the men's coxless four event at the 2016 Summer Olympics.
