= Romania at the 2016 Summer Olympics =

- IOC code: ROU
- NOC: Romanian Olympic and Sports Committee
- Website: www.cosr.ro (in Romanian, English, and French)

in Rio de Janeiro
- Competitors: 96 in 14 sports
- Flag bearers: Cătălina Ponor (opening); Simona Pop (closing)
- Medals Ranked 47th: Gold 1 Silver 1 Bronze 2 Total 4

Summer Olympics appearances (overview)
- 1900; 1904–1920; 1924; 1928; 1932; 1936; 1948; 1952; 1956; 1960; 1964; 1968; 1972; 1976; 1980; 1984; 1988; 1992; 1996; 2000; 2004; 2008; 2012; 2016; 2020; 2024

Romania competed at the 2016 Summer Olympics in Rio de Janeiro, Brazil, from 5 to 21 August 2016. Since the nation's Olympic participation started in 1900 (and its official debut in 1924), Romanian athletes had appeared in every edition of the Summer Olympic Games, except the 1932 Summer Olympics in Los Angeles during the Great Depression, and the 1948 Summer Olympics in London.

At the 2016 Olympics, the Romanian team consisted of 97 athletes, 34 men and 63 women, across 14 sports, their smallest in Summer Olympic history since 1988. For the fourth time in history, Romania fielded more female athletes than males at the Games, due to the proliferation of women in both athletics and rowing making the cut and the comeback of the women's handball squad after being absent from London 2012.

Romania left Rio de Janeiro with four medals (one gold, one silver, and two bronze), signifying the country's poorest performance at the Summer Olympics since 1952. The women's épée team brought home Romania's only gold medal at the Games, beating the top-ranked Chinese team in the final match with the help of early unmatched touches from four-time Olympian Ana Maria Brânză. Horia Tecău and Florin Mergea secured a historic first Olympic tennis medal of any color for their team, a silver in the men's doubles. The women's eight rowing squad made a late surge to obtain the final podium spot, while Russian-born Albert Saritov closed out the nation's overall tally at the Games with a bronze in freestyle wrestling. For the first time since 1972, Romanian athletes failed to earn an Olympic medal in artistic gymnastics.

Originally, Romania collected a total of five medals. On 13 October 2016, the International Olympic Committee stripped weightlifter Gabriel Sîncrăian of his bronze medal after he failed a drug test, with his sample showing excess testosterone.

== Medalists ==
Medal	Name	Sport	Event	Date
Gold	Ana Maria Brânză; Loredana Dinu; Simona Gherman; Simona Pop	Fencing	Women's team épée	11 August
Silver	Horia Tecău; Florin Mergea	Tennis	Men's doubles	12 August
Bronze	Mădălina Bereș; Andreea Boghian; Adelina Boguș; Roxana Cogianu; Iuliana Popa; Laura Oprea; Mihaela Petrilă; Ioana Strungaru; Daniela Druncea (cox)	Rowing	Women's eight	13 August
Bronze	Albert Saritov	Wrestling	Men's freestyle 97 kg	21 August

Medals by sport
Sport	1st place, gold medalist(s)	2nd place, silver medalist(s)	3rd place, bronze medalist(s)	Total
Fencing	1	0	0	1
Tennis	0	1	0	1
Rowing	0	0	1	1
Wrestling	0	0	1	1
Total	1	1	2	4

Medals by gender
Gender	1st place, gold medalist(s)	2nd place, silver medalist(s)	3rd place, bronze medalist(s)	Total
Male	0	1	1	2
Female	1	0	1	2
Total	1	1	2	4

== Competitors ==
Romanian Olympic and Sports Committee (Romanian: Comitetul Olimpic și Sportiv Român, COSR) fielded a team of 97 athletes, 34 men and 63 women, to compete across 14 sports at the Games; it was the nation's smallest delegation sent to the Olympics since 1952. For only the fourth time in history, Romania was represented by more female athletes than males, due to the proliferation of women in both athletics and rowing making the cut, and the comeback of the women's handball squad after being absent from London 2012. Of the 97 participants, 31 of them attended at least a single Olympiad, with the rest making their debut in Rio de Janeiro.

For the first time since 1968, Romania did not send any of the artistic gymnastics squads to the Games, snapping the country's medal streak in the team event after four decades. Track and field accounted for the largest number of athletes on the squad with 22 entries. There was a single competitor in boxing, road cycling, rhythmic gymnastics, and shooting.

Seven of the past Olympic medalists returned, including defending champion Alin Moldoveanu in men's air rifle shooting, triple jumper Marian Oprea, fencers Tiberiu Dolniceanu (men's sabre) and Ana Maria Brânză (women's épée), judoka Corina Căprioriu (women's 57 kg), and gymnastics veterans Marian Drăgulescu, who owned a career tally of three medals leading to his fourth Games, and three-time champion Cătălina Ponor, who was selected as the nation's flag bearer in the opening ceremony, the first by a gymnast in Romania's Olympic history.

Other notable competitors on the Romanian team included tennis player Horia Tecău and his new partner Florin Mergea (both world no. 3) in the men's doubles, Russian-born freestyle wrestler Albert Saritov, handball team captain Aurelia Brădeanu, and coxswain and former gymnast Daniela Druncea of the women's eight rowing crew. Fourteen-year-old swimmer Ana-Iulia Dascăl, who entered the Games through a universality invitation, was Romania's youngest competitor, with race walker Claudia Ștef rounding out the lineup as the oldest member (aged 38).

The following is the list of number of competitors who participated in the Games. Note that reserves in fencing, field hockey, football, gymnastics, handball and rowing are not counted as athletes:

Sport	Men	Women	Total
Athletics	6	16	22
Boxing	1	0	1
Cycling	1	0	1
Fencing	1	5	6
Gymnastics	2	2	4
Handball	0	14	14
Judo	1	3	4
Rowing	6	11	17
Shooting	1	0	1
Swimming	5	1	6
Table tennis	2	3	5
Tennis	2	4	6
Weightlifting	2	2	4
Wrestling	4	1	5
Total	34	62	96

== Athletics ==
Romanian athletes achieved qualifying standards in the following athletics events (up to a maximum of 3 athletes in each event):

A total of 18 athletes (six men and twelve women) were selected to the Romanian track and field team for the Games, including two-time Olympian Ancuța Bobocel (women's 3000 m steeplechase) and Athens 2004 silver medalist Marian Oprea (men's triple jump).

Key

- Note–Ranks given for track events are within the athlete's heat only
- Q = Qualified for the next round
- q = Qualified for the next round as a fastest loser or, in field events, by position without achieving the qualifying target
- NR = National record
- N/A = Round not applicable for the event
- Bye = Athlete not required to compete in round

Track & road events
Men

Athlete	Event	Final	
Athlete	Event	Result	Rank
Marius Ionescu	Marathon	2:17:27	37
Nicolae Soare	Marathon	2:31:53	127
Marius Cocioran	50 km walk	DNF	
Narcis Mihăilă	50 km walk	4:02:46	30

Women

Athlete	Event	Heat		Semifinal		Final	
Athlete	Event	Result	Rank	Result	Rank	Result	Rank
Bianca Răzor	400 m	52.42	6	did not advance			
Claudia Bobocea	800 m	2:03.75	6	Did not advance			
Florina Pierdevară	800 m	2:03.32	7	Did not advance			
Ancuța Bobocel	3000 m steeplechase	9:46.28	13	did not advance			
Bianca Răzor; Anamaria Ioniță; Andrea Miklos; Adelina Pastor	4 × 400 m relay	3:29.87	7	did not advance			
Daniela Cârlan	Marathon	—N/a				DNF	
Paula Todoran	Marathon	—N/a				2:48.54	101
Andreea Arsine	20 km walk	—N/a				1:38:16	45
Ana Veronica Rodean	20 km walk	—N/a				1:38:42	50
Claudia Ștef	20 km walk	—N/a				1:41:47	57

Field events

Athlete	Event	Qualification		Final	
Athlete	Event	Distance	Position	Distance	Position
Marian Oprea	Men's triple jump	NM	—	did not advance	
Andrei Gag	Men's shot put	20.40	13	did not advance	
Alina Rotaru	Women's long jump	6.40	18	did not advance	
Cristina Bujin	Women's triple jump	13.38	30	did not advance	
Elena Panțuroiu	Women's triple jump	14.00	16	did not advance	

== Boxing ==
Romania entered one boxer to compete in the following weight classes into the Olympic boxing tournament. Mihai Nistor was the only Romanian finishing among the top two of his respective weight division in the AIBA Pro Boxing series.

Athlete	Event	Round of 32	Round of 16	Quarterfinals	Semifinals	Final	
Athlete	Event	Opposition Result	Opposition Result	Opposition Result	Opposition Result	Opposition Result	Rank
Mihai Nistor	Men's super heavyweight	Bye	Ishaish (JOR); L 1–2	Did not advance			

== Cycling ==
=== Road ===
Romania qualified one rider in the men's Olympic road race by virtue of his top 200 individual ranking in the 2015 UCI Europe Tour.

Athlete	Event	Time	Rank
Serghei Țvetcov	Men's road race	DNF	

== Fencing ==
Romanian fencers qualified a full squad in the women's team épée by virtue of their top four national finish in the FIE Olympic Team Rankings. Meanwhile, 2012 Olympic silver medalist Tiberiu Dolniceanu secured a spot on the Romanian team in the men's sabre by finishing among the top 14 individual fencers in the FIE Adjusted Official Rankings. Foil fencer Mălina Călugăreanu rounded out the Romanian roster by finishing among the top four individuals at the European Zonal Qualifier in Prague, Czech Republic.

Athlete	Event	Round of 64	Round of 32	Round of 16	Quarterfinal	Semifinal	Final / BM	
Athlete	Event	Opposition Score	Opposition Score	Opposition Score	Opposition Score	Opposition Score	Opposition Score	Rank
Tiberiu Dolniceanu	Men's sabre	—N/a	Sun W (CHN); W 15–7	van Holsbeke (BEL); W 15–13	Szilágyi (HUN); L 10–15	did not advance		
Ana Maria Brânză	Women's épée	Bye	Mallo (FRA); W 15–8	Choi I-j (KOR); L 8–15	did not advance			
Simona Gherman	Women's épée	Bye	Rembi (FRA); L 10–13	did not advance				
Simona Pop	Women's épée	MacKinnon (CAN); L 10–15	did not advance					
Ana Maria Brânză; Loredana Dinu; Simona Gherman; Simona Pop	Women's team épée	—N/a		Bye	United States; W 24–23	Russia; W 45–31	China; W 44–38	1st place, gold medalist(s)
Mălina Călugăreanu	Women's foil	Bulcão (BRA); L 12–15	did not advance					

== Gymnastics ==
=== Artistic ===
Romania did not send any all-around teams to the Olympics for the first time since 1968, despite Cătălina Ponor coming out of retirement. This ended the streak of winning a team medal in the event since 1976. Romania entered three artistic gymnasts into the Olympic competition. Four-time Olympic medalist Marian Drăgulescu claimed his Olympic spot in the men's apparatus and all-around events at the 2015 World Championships, while two more places were awarded to one Romanian male and female gymnast, who participated at the Olympic Test Event in Rio de Janeiro.

Men

Athlete	Event	Qualification								Final							
Athlete	Event	Apparatus						Total	Rank	Apparatus						Total	Rank
Athlete	Event	F	PH	R	V	PB	HB	Total	Rank	F	PH	R	V	PB	HB	Total	Rank
Andrei Muntean	All-around	13.733	12.500	13.700	14.633	15.466 Q	13.833	83.865	36	did not advance							
Andrei Muntean	Parallel bars	—N/a				15.466	—N/a	15.466	9 Q	—N/a				15.600	—N/a	15.600	6
Marian Drăgulescu	Floor	12.800	—N/a					12.800	67	did not advance							
Marian Drăgulescu	Vault	—N/a			15.283	—N/a		15.283	5 Q	—N/a			15.449	—N/a		15.449	4
Marian Drăgulescu	Horizontal bar	—N/a					12.166	12.166	70	did not advance							

Women

Athlete	Event	Qualification						Final					
Athlete	Event	Apparatus				Total	Rank	Apparatus				Total	Rank
Athlete	Event	V	UB	BB	F	Total	Rank	V	UB	BB	F	Total	Rank
Cătălina Ponor	Balance beam	—N/a		14.900	—N/a	14.900	5 Q	—N/a		14.000	—N/a	14.000	7
Cătălina Ponor	Floor	—N/a			14.200	14.200	14	did not advance					

=== Rhythmic ===
Romania qualified one rhythmic gymnast in the individual all-around for the Games by claiming one of eight available Olympic spots at the Olympic Test Event in Rio de Janeiro.

Athlete	Event	Qualification						Final					
Athlete	Event	Hoop	Ball	Clubs	Ribbon	Total	Rank	Hoop	Ball	Clubs	Ribbon	Total	Rank
Ana Luiza Filiorianu	Individual	16.850	16.800	16.808	17.000	67.458	22	Did not advance					

== Handball ==
Summary

Key:

- ET – After extra time
- P – Match decided by penalty-shootout.

Team	Event	Group Stage						Quarterfinal	Semifinal	Final / BM	
Team	Event	Opposition Score	Opposition Score	Opposition Score	Opposition Score	Opposition Score	Rank	Opposition Score	Opposition Score	Opposition Score	Rank
Romania women's	Women's tournament	Angola; L 19–23	Brazil; L 13–26	Montenegro; W 25–21	Spain; W 24–21	Norway; L 27–28	5	did not advance			9

=== Women's tournament ===
The Romanian women's handball team qualified for the Olympics by virtue of a top two finish at the second meet of the Olympic Qualification Tournament in Aarhus, Denmark.

Team roster

The following is the Romanian roster in the women's handball tournament of the 2016 Summer Olympics.

Head coach: (Sweden) Tomas Ryde

No.	Pos.	Name	Date of birth (age)	Height	App.	Goals	Club
3	LB	Gabriella Szűcs	31 August 1984 (aged 31)	1.79 m	5	3	(Romania) Dunărea Brăila
5	RB	Melinda Geiger	28 March 1987 (aged 29)	1.77 m	70	165	(France) Brest Bretagne Handball
7	CB	Eliza Buceschi	31 August 1993 (aged 22)	1.75 m	26	54	(Denmark) FC Midtjylland
8	LB	Cristina Neagu	26 August 1988 (aged 27)	1.80 m	128	521	(Montenegro) Budućnost
9	CB	Aurelia Brădeanu	5 May 1979 (aged 37)	1.79 m	253	637	(Romania) CSM București
11	LB	Gabriela Perianu	20 June 1994 (aged 22)	1.87 m	23	45	(Romania) Dunărea Brăila
12	GK	Ionica Munteanu	7 January 1979 (aged 37)	1.75 m	17	0	(Romania) Universitatea Cluj-Napoca
15	LW	Valentina Ardean-Elisei	5 June 1982 (aged 34)	1.75 m	205	807	(Romania) S.C.M. Craiova
22	P	Oana Manea	18 April 1985 (aged 31)	1.75 m	274	355	(Romania) CSM București
25	LW	Camelia Hotea	28 October 1984 (aged 31)	1.74 m	38	60	(Romania) Corona Brașov
30	GK	Paula Ungureanu	30 March 1980 (aged 36)	1.80 m	140	2	(Romania) CSM București
85	P	Florina Chintoan	6 December 1985 (aged 30)	1.78 m	106	140	(Romania) Universitatea Cluj-Napoca
88	RB	Patricia Vizitiu	15 October 1988 (aged 27)	1.77 m	35	48	(Romania) HCM Râmnicu Vâlcea
89	RW	Laura Chiper	21 August 1989 (aged 26)	1.73 m	15	30	(Romania) Corona Brașov

Group play

Pos	Team	Pld	W	D	L	GF	GA	GD	Pts	Qualification
1	Brazil (H)	5	4	0	1	138	117	+21	8	Quarter-finals
2	Norway	5	4	0	1	141	121	+20	8	Quarter-finals
3	Spain	5	3	0	2	125	116	+9	6	Quarter-finals
4	Angola	5	2	0	3	116	128	−12	4	Quarter-finals
5	Romania	5	2	0	3	108	119	−11	4	
6	Montenegro	5	0	0	5	107	134	−27	0	

Source: IHF
Rules for classification: 1) Points; 2) Head-to-head points; 3) Head-to-head goal difference; 4) Head-to-head goals scored; 5) Goal difference; 6) Goals scored; 7) Draw.
(H) Hosts

6 August 2016; 19:50	Romania	19–23	Angola	Future Arena, Rio de Janeiro; Attendance: 4,465; Referees: Koo, Lee (KOR)
6 August 2016; 19:50	Neagu 8	(9–11)	Guialo 5	Future Arena, Rio de Janeiro; Attendance: 4,465; Referees: Koo, Lee (KOR)
6 August 2016; 19:50	2× (yellow card) 2× (suspension)	Report	3× (yellow card) 5× (suspension)	Future Arena, Rio de Janeiro; Attendance: 4,465; Referees: Koo, Lee (KOR)

8 August 2016; 16:40	Brazil	26–13	Romania	Future Arena, Rio de Janeiro; Referees: Bonaventura, Bonaventura (FRA)
8 August 2016; 16:40	Belo 8	(14–9)	Neagu 6	Future Arena, Rio de Janeiro; Referees: Bonaventura, Bonaventura (FRA)
8 August 2016; 16:40	2× (yellow card) 2× (suspension) 1× (red card)	Report	2× (yellow card) 4× (suspension)	Future Arena, Rio de Janeiro; Referees: Bonaventura, Bonaventura (FRA)

10 August 2016; 11:30	Romania	25–21	Montenegro	Future Arena, Rio de Janeiro; Referees: Rashed, El-Sayed (EGY)
10 August 2016; 11:30	Neagu 10	(11–9)	K. Bulatović 9	Future Arena, Rio de Janeiro; Referees: Rashed, El-Sayed (EGY)
10 August 2016; 11:30	3× (yellow card) 4× (suspension)	Report	4× (yellow card) 4× (suspension)	Future Arena, Rio de Janeiro; Referees: Rashed, El-Sayed (EGY)

12 August 2016; 14:40	Romania	24–21	Spain	Future Arena, Rio de Janeiro; Referees: Bonaventura, Bonaventura (FRA)
12 August 2016; 14:40	Neagu 9	(13–11)	three players 4	Future Arena, Rio de Janeiro; Referees: Bonaventura, Bonaventura (FRA)
12 August 2016; 14:40	2× (yellow card) 2× (suspension)	Report	3× (yellow card) 1× (suspension)	Future Arena, Rio de Janeiro; Referees: Bonaventura, Bonaventura (FRA)

14 August 2016; 16:40	Norway	28–27	Romania	Future Arena, Rio de Janeiro; Referees: Alpaidze, Berekzina (RUS)
14 August 2016; 16:40	Kristiansen 7	(14–13)	Neagu 11	Future Arena, Rio de Janeiro; Referees: Alpaidze, Berekzina (RUS)
14 August 2016; 16:40	3× (yellow card) 6× (suspension)	Report	3× (yellow card) 6× (suspension)	Future Arena, Rio de Janeiro; Referees: Alpaidze, Berekzina (RUS)

== Judo ==
Romania qualified a total of four judokas for the following weight classes at the Games. Daniel Natea, Monica Ungureanu, London 2012 Olympian Andreea Chițu, and silver medalist Corina Căprioriu were ranked among the top 22 eligible judokas for men and top 14 for women in the IJF World Ranking List of 30 May 2016.

Athlete	Event	Round of 64	Round of 32	Round of 16	Quarterfinals	Semifinals	Repechage	Final / BM	
Athlete	Event	Opposition Result	Opposition Result	Opposition Result	Opposition Result	Opposition Result	Opposition Result	Opposition Result	Rank
Daniel Natea	Men's +100 kg	—N/a	Yea-on (THA); W 100–000	Tangriev (UZB); L 000–110	did not advance				
Monica Ungureanu	Women's −48 kg	—N/a	van Snick (BEL); L 000–100	did not advance					
Andreea Chițu	Women's −52 kg	—N/a	Bye	Gómez (ESP); W 101–000	Giuffrida (ITA); L 000–001	Did not advance	Miranda (BRA); L 010–100	Did not advance	7
Corina Căprioriu	Women's −57 kg	—N/a	Bye	Gjakova (KOS); W 002–000	Lien C-l (TPE); W 100–000	R Silva (BRA); L 000–010	Bye	Monteiro (POR); L 000–001	5

== Rowing ==
Romania qualified a total of five boats for each of the following rowing classes into the Olympic regatta. Three rowing crews confirmed Olympic places for their boats at the 2015 FISA World Championships in Lac d'Aiguebelette, France, while the rowers competing in the women's lightweight double sculls and women's eight were further added to the Romanian roster as a result of their top two finish at the 2016 European & Final Qualification Regatta in Lucerne, Switzerland.

Men

Athlete	Event	Heats		Repechage		Semifinals		Final	
Athlete	Event	Time	Rank	Time	Rank	Time	Rank	Time	Rank
George Alexandru Pălămariu; Cristi-Ilie Pîrghie	Pair	6:51.71	3 SA/B	Bye		6:48.17	6 FB	7:13.68	12
Vlad Dragoș Aicoboae; Marius Cozmiuc; Constantin Adam; Toader-Andrei Gontaru	Four	6:02.56	4 R	6:39.64	4	did not advance			

Women

Athlete	Event	Heats		Repechage		Semifinals		Final	
Athlete	Event	Time	Rank	Time	Rank	Time	Rank	Time	Rank
Mădălina Bereș; Laura Oprea	Pair	7:18.16	5 R	7:55.25	1 SA/B	7:29.20	4 FB	7:19.63	9
Gianina Beleagă; Ionela-Livia Lehaci	Lightweight double sculls	7:07.29	3 R	8:00.47	1 SA/B	7:21.38	4 FB	7:24.61	8
Mădălina Bereș; Andreea Boghian; Adelina Boguș; Roxana Cogianu; Iuliana Popa; Laura Oprea; Mihaela Petrilă; Ioana Strungaru; Daniela Druncea (cox)	Eight	6:16.24	3 R	6:32.63	2 FA	Bye		6:04.10	3rd place, bronze medalist(s)

Qualification Legend: FA=Final A (medal); FB=Final B (non-medal); FC=Final C (non-medal); FD=Final D (non-medal); FE=Final E (non-medal); FF=Final F (non-medal); SA/B=Semifinals A/B; SC/D=Semifinals C/D; SE/F=Semifinals E/F; QF=Quarterfinals; R=Repechage

== Shooting ==
Romania received a wildcard invitation from ISSF to send London 2012 champion Alin Moldoveanu in the men's air rifle to the Olympics, as long as the minimum qualifying score (MQS) was met by 31 March 2016.

Athlete	Event	Qualification		Final	
Athlete	Event	Points	Rank	Points	Rank
Alin Moldoveanu	Men's 10 m air rifle	622.7	19	did not advance	

Qualification Legend: Q = Qualify for the next round; q = Qualify for the bronze medal (shotgun)

== Swimming ==
Romanian swimmers achieved qualifying standards in the following events (up to a maximum of 2 swimmers in each event at the Olympic Qualifying Time (OQT), and potentially 1 at the Olympic Selection Time (OST)):

Athlete	Event	Heat		Semifinal		Final	
Athlete	Event	Time	Rank	Time	Rank	Time	Rank
Robert Glință	Men's 100 m backstroke	53.51	9 Q	53.34 NR	4 Q	53.50	8
Robert Glință	Men's 200 m backstroke	1:57.91	18	did not advance			
Marius Radu	Men's 100 m freestyle	49.57	38	did not advance			
Norbert Trandafir	Men's 50 m freestyle	22.10	16 Q	21.99	14	did not advance	
Alin Coste; Daniel Macovei; Marius Radu; Norbert Trandafir	Men's 4 × 100 m freestyle relay	3:17.03	16	—N/a		did not advance	
Ana-Iulia Dascăl	Women's 100 m freestyle	58.72	36	did not advance			

== Table tennis ==
Romania fielded a team of five athletes into the table tennis competition at the Games. Ovidiu Ionescu, along with two-time Olympians Elizabeta Samara and Daniela Dodean, were automatically selected among the top 22 eligible players each in their respective singles events based on the ITTF Olympic Rankings. Meanwhile, Adrian Crișan was granted an invitation from the ITTF to compete in the men's singles as one of the next seven highest-ranked eligible players, not yet qualified, on the Olympic Ranking List.

Bernadette Szőcs was awarded the third spot to build the women's team for the Games by virtue of a top 10 national finish in the ITTF Olympic Rankings.

Athlete	Event	Preliminary	Round 1	Round 2	Round 3	Round of 16	Quarterfinals	Semifinals	Final / BM	
Athlete	Event	Opposition Result	Opposition Result	Opposition Result	Opposition Result	Opposition Result	Opposition Result	Opposition Result	Opposition Result	Rank
Adrian Crișan	Men's singles	Bye	Kamal (IND); W 4–1	Lebesson (FRA); W 4–3	Lee S-s (KOR); W 4–3	Zhang Jk (CHN); L 0–4	did not advance			
Ovidiu Ionescu	Men's singles	Bye	Ni Alamian (IRI); W 4–1	Gardos (AUT); W 4–1	Freitas (POR); L 1–4	did not advance				
Daniela Dodean	Women's singles	Bye	Das (IND); W 4–0	Li Q (POL); W 4–1	Fukuhara (JPN); L 0–4	did not advance				
Elizabeta Samara	Women's singles	Bye		Lin G (BRA); W 4–0	Ding N (CHN); L 0–4	did not advance				
Daniela Dodean; Elizabeta Samara; Bernadette Szőcs	Women's team	—N/a				South Korea; L 2–3	did not advance			

== Tennis ==
Romania entered seven tennis players into the Olympic tournament. Irina-Camelia Begu (world no. 28), Simona Halep (world no. 5), and Monica Niculescu (world no. 37) qualified directly among the top 56 eligible players for the women's singles based on the WTA World Rankings, while London 2012 Olympian Horia Tecău teamed up with his partner Florin Mergea in the men's doubles by virtue of his top 10 ATP ranking as of 6 June 2016. Andreea Mitu and Raluca Olaru received a spare ITF Olympic place freed up by the Italians to join Begu and Niculescu in the women's doubles.

On 15 July 2016, Halep pulled out from the Games due to her concerns about the Zika virus.

Men

Athlete	Event	Round of 32	Round of 16	Quarterfinals	Semifinals	Final / BM	
Athlete	Event	Opposition Score	Opposition Score	Opposition Score	Opposition Score	Opposition Score	Rank
Florin Mergea; Horia Tecău	Doubles	Delbonis/ Durán (ARG); W 6–3, 6–2	González/ Reyes-Varela (MEX); W 6–3, 7–6^{(11–9)}	Melo/ Soares (BRA); W 6–4, 5–7, 6–2	Johnson/ Sock (USA); W 6–3, 7–5	López/ Nadal (ESP); L 2–6, 6–3, 4–6	2nd place, silver medalist(s)

Women

Athlete	Event	Round of 64	Round of 32	Round of 16	Quarterfinals	Semifinals	Final / BM	
Athlete	Event	Opposition Score	Opposition Score	Opposition Score	Opposition Score	Opposition Score	Opposition Score	Rank
Irina-Camelia Begu	Singles	Hibino (JPN); L 4–6, 6–3, 3–6	did not advance					
Andreea Mitu	Singles	Muguruza (ESP); L 2–6, 2–6	did not advance					
Monica Niculescu	Singles	Cepede Royg (PAR); W 6–2, 6–3	Kuznetsova (RUS); L WO	did not advance				
Irina-Camelia Begu; Monica Niculescu	Doubles	—N/a	Chan H-c / Chan Y-j (TPE); L 7–5, 4–6, 3–6	did not advance				
Andreea Mitu; Raluca Olaru	Doubles	—N/a	Babos / Jani (HUN); W 6–3, 6–4	Makarova / Vesnina (RUS); L 1–6, 4–6	did not advance			

Mixed

Athlete	Event	Round of 16	Quarterfinals	Semifinals	Final / BM	
Athlete	Event	Opposition Score	Opposition Score	Opposition Score	Opposition Score	Rank
Irina-Camelia Begu; Horia Tecău	Doubles	Radwańska/ Kubot (POL); W 6–4, 6–7^{(1–7)}, [10–8]	Štěpánek / Hradecká (CZE); L 4–6, 5–7	Did not advance		

== Weightlifting ==
Romanian weightlifters qualified three men's and two women's quota places for the Rio Olympics based on their combined team standing by points at the 2014 and 2015 IWF World Championships. The team had to allocate these places to individual athletes by 20 June 2016.

On 19 November 2015, the International Weightlifting Federation decided to strip one men's entry place from Romania because of "multiple positive cases" of doping.

Athlete	Event	Snatch		Clean & Jerk		Total	Rank
Athlete	Event	Result	Rank	Result	Rank	Total	Rank
Dumitru Captari	Men's −77 kg	145	14	—	—	145	DNF
Gabriel Sîncrăian	Men's −85 kg	173	5	217	1	390	DSQ
Florina Sorina Hulpan	Women's −69 kg	100	12	—	—	100	DNF
Andreea Aanei	Women's +75 kg	120	6	145	10	265	8

== Wrestling ==
Romania qualified a total of four wrestlers for each of the following weight classes into the Olympic competition. One of them finished among the top six to book Olympic spot in the men's Greco-Roman 98 kg at the 2015 World Championships, while another Olympic berth was awarded to the Romanian wrestler who progressed to the top two finals of the women's freestyle 48 kg at the 2016 European Qualification Tournament.

Three further wrestlers claimed Olympic slots to round out the Romanian roster at the Olympic Qualification Tournaments; two of them at the initial meet in Ulaanbaatar and one more in the men's freestyle 98 kg at the final meet in Istanbul.

Key:

- VT – Victory by fall.
- PP – Decision by points – the loser with technical points.
- PO – Decision by points – the loser without technical points.
- ST – Great superiority – the loser without technical points and a margin of victory of at least 8 (Greco-Roman) or 10 (freestyle) points.

Men's freestyle

Athlete	Event	Qualification	Round of 16	Quarterfinal	Semifinal	Repechage 1	Repechage 2	Final / BM	
Athlete	Event	Opposition Result	Opposition Result	Opposition Result	Opposition Result	Opposition Result	Opposition Result	Opposition Result	Rank
Ivan Guidea	−57 kg	Bye	Atlı (TUR); W 3–1 ^{PP}	Dubov (BUL); L 0–5 ^{VT}	did not advance				11
Albert Saritov	−97 kg	Bye	Ceban (MDA); W 3–1 ^{PP}	Snyder (USA); L 0–3 ^{PO}	Did not advance	Bye	Cortina (CUB); W 3–1 ^{PP}	Odikadze (GEO); W 4–0 ^{ST}	3rd place, bronze medalist(s)

Men's Greco-Roman

Athlete	Event	Qualification	Round of 16	Quarterfinal	Semifinal	Repechage 1	Repechage 2	Final / BM	
Athlete	Event	Opposition Result	Opposition Result	Opposition Result	Opposition Result	Opposition Result	Opposition Result	Opposition Result	Rank
Ion Panait	−66 kg	Albiev (RUS); L 1–3 ^{PP}	did not advance						12
Alin Alexuc-Ciurariu	−98 kg	Bye	El-Said (EGY); W 3–1 ^{PP}	Aleksanyan (ARM); L 0–4 ^{ST}	Did not advance	Bye	Timoncini (ITA); W 3–0 ^{PO}	İldem (TUR); L 0–3 ^{PO}	5

Women's freestyle

Athlete	Event	Qualification	Round of 16	Quarterfinal	Semifinal	Repechage 1	Repechage 2	Final / BM	
Athlete	Event	Opposition Result	Opposition Result	Opposition Result	Opposition Result	Opposition Result	Opposition Result	Opposition Result	Rank
Alina Vuc	−48 kg	Bye	Phogat (IND); L 0–4 ^{ST}	did not advance					18

== See also ==
- Romania at the 2016 Summer Paralympics
