= Helen Glover =

British rower

Helen Glover OBE
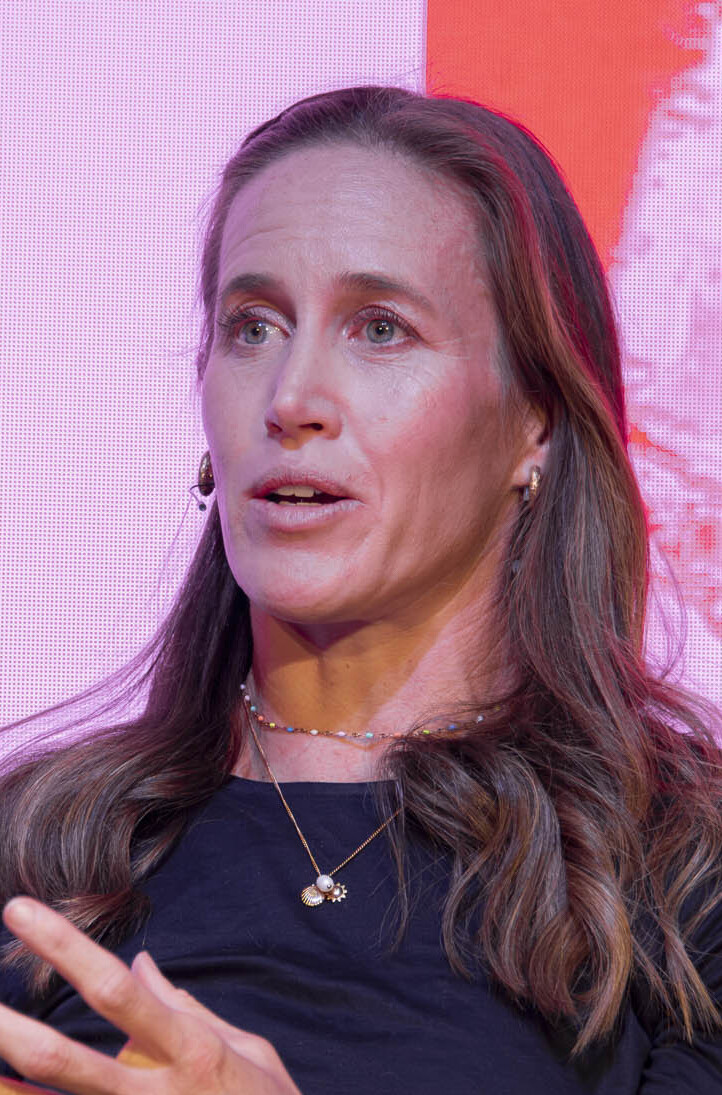
- Glover in 2025

Personal information
- Full name: Helen Rachel Mary Backshall
- Nationality: British
- Born: Helen Rachel Mary Glover; 17 June 1986 (age 40) Truro, Cornwall, England
- Height: 5 ft 10 in (1.78 m)
- Weight: 11 st 0 lb; 154 lb (70 kg)
- Spouse: Steve Backshall (m. 2016)
- Children: 3

Sport
- Country: Great Britain
- Sport: Rowing
- Turned pro: 2010
- Partners: Heather Stanning 2010–2012, 2014–2016; Polly Swann 2013–2014, 2021
- Coached by: Paul Stannard 2008–2010; Robin Williams 2010–2013, 2014, 2021; Paul Thompson 2014

Achievements and titles
- Olympic finals: Champion (W2–) 2012, 2016
- World finals: Champion (W2–) 2013, 2014, 2015
- Highest world ranking: World #1 female in 2015–2016
- Personal best: 6:50.61 at 2014 World Rowing Championships
Medal record
Women's rowing
Representing Great Britain
Olympic Games
Gold medal – first place	2012 London	Coxless pair
Gold medal – first place	2016 Rio de Janeiro	Coxless pair
Silver medal – second place	2024 Paris	Coxless four
World Championships
Gold medal – first place	2013 Chungju	Coxless pair
Gold medal – first place	2014 Amsterdam	Coxless pair
Gold medal – first place	2015 Aiguebelette-le-lac	Coxless pair
Silver medal – second place	2010 Cambridge	Coxless pair
Silver medal – second place	2011 Bled	Coxless pair
Bronze medal – third place	2023 Belgrade	Coxless four
European Championships
Gold medal – first place	2014 Belgrade	Coxless pair
Gold medal – first place	2015 Poznań	Coxless pair
Gold medal – first place	2016 Brandenburg an der Havel	Coxless pair
Gold medal – first place	2021 Varese	Coxless pair
Gold medal – first place	2024 Szeged	Coxless four
Silver medal – second place	2023 Bled	Coxless four

Helen Rachel Mary Backshall (née Glover; born 17 June 1986) is a British professional rower and a member of the Great Britain Rowing Team. Ranked the number 1 female rower in the world in 2015–16, she is a two-time Olympic champion, triple World champion, quintuple World Cup champion and quintuple European champion. She and her partner Heather Stanning were the World, Olympic, World Cup and European record holders, plus the Olympic, World and European champions in the women's coxless pairs. She has also been a British champion in both women's fours and quadruple sculls.

At the 2012 Summer Olympics, in partnership with Heather Stanning, she set the Olympic record and won the gold medal in the women's coxless pairs, the inaugural gold medal won by Team GB in 2012 and the first Olympic gold medal for British women's rowing. In December 2012, she won the BBC Olympic Superstars game show. At the 2013 World Rowing Championships in South Korea, she became the world champion with her partner Polly Swann, with whom she also won the 2014 European Rowing Championships at Belgrade and thus became the first woman to hold the Olympic, World and European titles for the coxless pair. She retained her world title and set the world record time in partnership with Heather Stanning at the 2014 World Rowing Championships in Amsterdam. They retained their world title at the 2015 World Rowing Championships in Lac d'Aiguebelette, France. In 2016, they retained their European title at Brandenburg an der Havel, set the World Rowing Cup record time at Poznań and again won gold at the Olympics in Rio de Janeiro. She retired after the Olympics to begin a family.

In 2021, it was announced that she had restarted training, and on 11 April she regained the European Coxless Pair title in Varese with Polly Swann. She and Swann finished fourth in the Summer Olympics in Tokyo, the first mother to row for Britain. Glover said "Everyone will remember the year of the pandemic for their own reasons, but for me I'm going to think 'that was the year that took me to another Olympics' And that's bonkers."

== Early life ==
=== Family ===
Glover was born in Treliske Hospital, Truro to Rachel (née Tucker), a physiotherapist who trained at Guy's Hospital, and Jimmy Glover, a school teacher and Oxford University graduate. She grew up in Penzance in a competitive athletic family with older brother Benjamin, younger twin brother Nathan, and younger sisters, Ruth and Freya.

Her father is a retired school teacher (English) turned ice cream vendor. Jelbert's Ices of Newlyn was started by Glover's great-grandfather. Her father was an all-round sportsman who played tennis at Junior Wimbledon, played football for Penzance 'Magpies' FC and captained the Penzance Pirates rugby team. He captained the University of Oxford in both the 1960 Varsity Match and against South Africa; he made 199 appearances for Bristol; played for 'Devon & Cornwall' against the 'All Blacks'; played for the Barbarians; and captained Cornwall in the County Championship whilst winning 41 caps.

=== Education ===
Educated at Heamoor Community Primary School and Humphry Davy School in Penzance, Glover won a sports scholarship to Millfield School in Somerset between 2002 and 2004 due to her running and hockey prowess. She participated in a variety of sports: as a junior she ran cross-country and middle-distance track both for Cornwall and internationally for England, winning a junior international gold medal for England in cross-country running; she played tennis for Cornwall; she swam for Cornwall; she captained the Cornish hockey team; and by the age of 14 was part of the England Satellite Squad for hockey. Her best UK athletic rankings were 23rd for 800 metres, 9th for 1500 metres and 18th for 3000 metres.

Her former PE teacher, Kate Finch, said: "She always had this phenomenal all-round talent, totally committed and totally reliable. You knew if you had Helen in any team you were safe. She took part in everything. She excelled in hockey and cross country. Helen was so hard working and so coachable. If you asked her to do something, she would do it."

Glover said, "When I was at school I was quite strong-minded, I started up sports teams, I played in the boys' football team. I wouldn't let anyone tell me I couldn't do anything".

At University of Wales Institute, Cardiff Glover studied Sport and Exercise Science, and then studied for a PGCE at the University College Plymouth St Mark & St John, in order to teach physical education to secondary school children.

== Career ==
=== 2008 ===
In July 2008, between graduating from the University of Wales and starting at University College Plymouth, Glover, at her mother's suggestion, applied to the Sporting Giants scheme, whereby she was placed on GB Rowing Team's "Start" programme under coach Paul Stannard at Minerva Bath Rowing Club in Bath, Somerset. Thus, whilst attending University College in Plymouth, she transferred her 'teaching placement' to Oldfield School, Bath. After winning Olympic gold she confessed to having achieved the Sporting Giant criterion of 5 ft 11 in (1.80 m) by standing on tiptoes while being measured – she is 5 ft 10 in (1.78 m).

She was fourth at the British Indoor Rowing Championships on 26 October 2008.

=== 2009 ===
In 2009, she won the Bernard Churcher Trophy in the senior single scull at the Henley Women's Regatta.

=== 2010 ===
In February 2010, Glover gave up her teaching job and lived with no income while focusing exclusively on training for the national team selection trials. In March she rowed with the Reading University eight and finished third at the Women's Eights Head of the River Race.

In April, she finished 5th at the GB Rowing Team Senior Trials, won a place on the team, gained Lottery funding and was paired with Heather Stanning in the women's coxless pair. In May at the World Rowing Cup in Bled they finished 9th, and in June they finished 5th at Munich, but were unable to race at Lucerne in July due to Glover's illness.

Robin Williams started coaching Glover and Stanning in July when they were ranked 16th and 17th in their event, and were also regarded as reserves for the women's eight. They improved so rapidly that by November they won a silver medal at the 2010 World Rowing Championships at Lake Karapiro in New Zealand, finishing in 7:20.24 three seconds behind Juliette Haigh and Rebecca Scown of New Zealand.

=== 2011 ===
In 2011, Glover and Stanning won the coxless pair event at the GB Rowing Team Senior Trials at Eton-Dorney with a time of 7 minutes 15 seconds. They went on to win both the Munich and Lucerne World Rowing Cup regattas, beating the reigning world champions Haigh and Scown of New Zealand. Great Britain did not enter round 2 of the World Cup in Hamburg due to an E. coli outbreak in the area.

Glover and Stanning finished second in the 2011 World Rowing Championships at Lake Bled, Slovenia, 0.1 seconds behind the winning New Zealand crew of Haigh and Scown, despite both getting a stomach bug when they arrived in Slovenia. Their coach Robin Williams described it as "a gold medal performance without getting the gold medal". In 2015, after retaining their world championship, Stanning said "Thinking back four years we were clear water ahead but lost it on the line. We certainly haven’t forgotten that lesson."

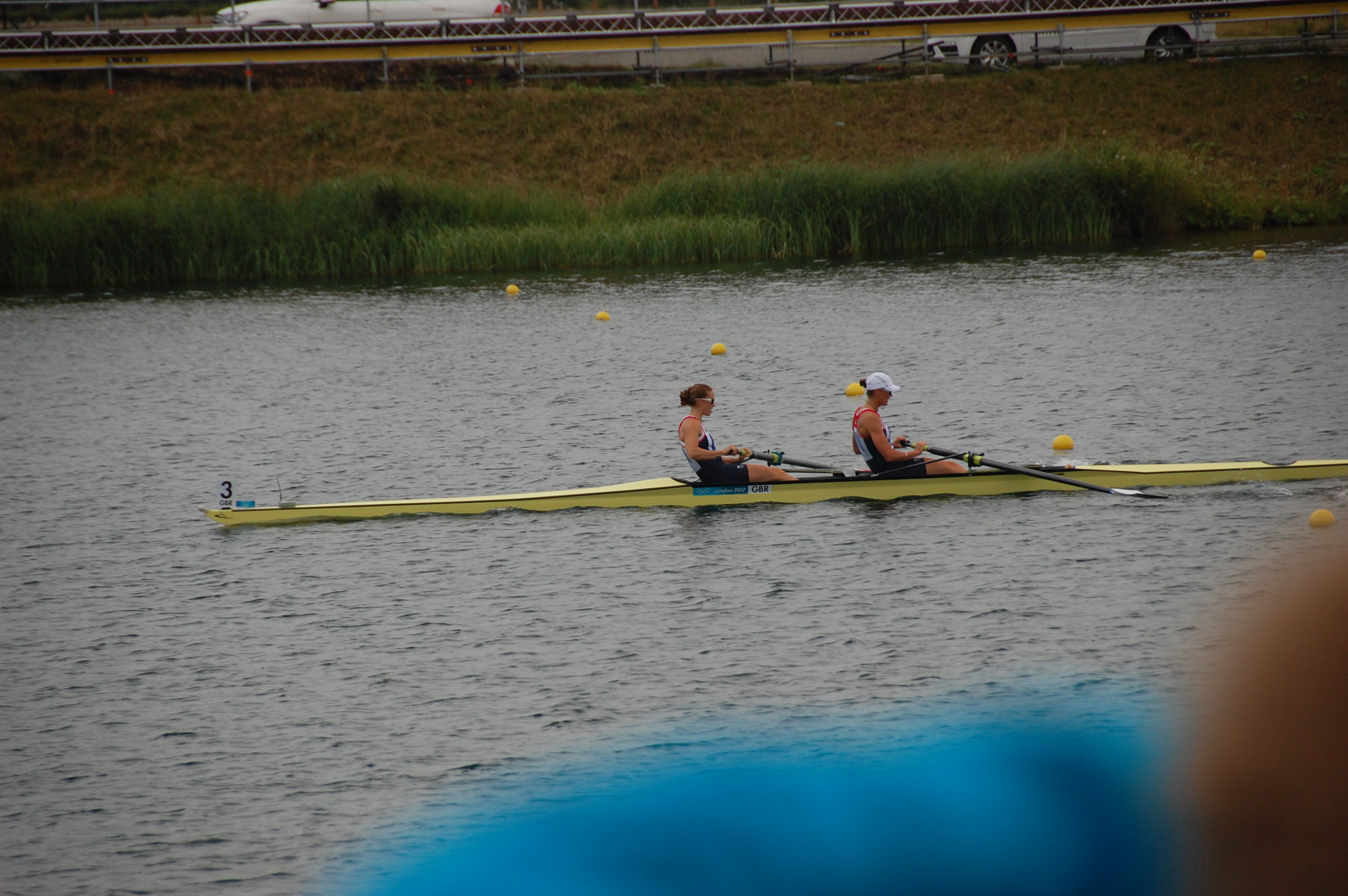
Helen Glover and Heather Stanning at Dorney Lake during the 2012 Summer Olympics.

=== 2012 ===
In 2012, Glover and Stanning again won the coxless pair event at the GB Rowing Team selection trials at Eton Dorney on 10–11 March, and went on to complete a clean sweep of all three events in the women's coxless pair of the World Rowing Cup. Winning gold at Belgrade Sava, Serbia in May; Lucerne Rotsee, Switzerland in May; and Munich Oberschleissheim, Germany in June.

On 1 August 2012, Glover and Stanning won the gold medal in the women's coxless pair at the 2012 Summer Olympics. Having already set a new Olympic record of 6 minutes 57.29 seconds in the heats, they finished the final ahead of Kate Hornsey and Sarah Tait of Australia, and Juliette Haigh and Rebecca Scown of New Zealand. The architect of their victory, coach Robin Williams, had prepared them for the final by engaging them in the word game Boggle for 45 minutes before their final call. This was Team GB's first gold medal of London 2012, and the first ever Olympic gold medal for British women's rowing. As with other gold medal winners, Royal Mail issued a commemorative stamp showing their celebrations, plus painting a post box gold in her home town of Penzance. Within a week of winning her medal she broke it and thus received a replacement.

In December, Glover became the women's champion of the BBC's Olympic Superstars 2012 by winning the 800-metre run in 2 mins 24 seconds, plus the swimming, cycling and gym rounds – she also out-performed the men in both the swimming and gym rounds. The Daily Telegraph described her as the "nicely-spoken pony-tailed epitome of the sporting Englishwoman".

=== 2013 ===
In April 2013, Glover won the women's single scull at the GB Rowing Team Trials held at the Redgrave Pinsent Rowing Lake, Caversham, Berkshire.

Teamed with Polly Swann in the women's coxless pair, Glover completed a second clean sweep of three victories at the World Rowing Cup, winning gold at Penrith Lakes, Australia in March; Eton Dorney, London in June; and Lucerne Rotsee in July. Glover said "I wanted Polly to know that she wasn’t just a Heather substitute, she wasn't just filling in. ... when Polly and I raced together for the first time and we were fast it was very exciting. I had to adapt. Polly can provide enormous power all the way down the course, but our final product was not a million miles from the way Heather and I raced."

In July at the Henley Royal Regatta she teamed up with Polly Swann, Victoria Meyer-Laker and Frances Houghton to win the Princess Grace Challenge Cup for women's quadruple scull. Competing as Leander Club and Minerva Bath Rowing Club they completed the final course in 6 minutes 59 seconds.

On 31 August, teamed with Polly Swann in the women's coxless pair, she became the world champion at the 2013 World Rowing Championships at Chungju in South Korea. They completed the final in 7 mins 22.82 secs, finishing ahead of Roxana Cogianu and Nicoleta Albu of Romania, and having overhauled the American boat which had led briefly in the early stages.

In September 2013, she was the International Rowing Federation's Athlete of the Month and featured on its World Rowing site. Sir David Tanner, British Rowing performance director, said "Nuggets are individuals that you can't always programme. We may never find another Helen Glover who progresses so rapidly."

In December 2013, Glover and Swann were voted as Team of the Year by the SportsSister organisation; additionally Glover won the 'Readers Choice' vote. Glover and Swann also received the chairman's award from the Sports Journalists' Association (SJA).

=== 2014 ===
On 17 March 2014, Glover was part of the composite crew that won the Women's Eights Head of the River Race on the River Thames in London, setting a record time of 17:42.2 for the 4 1/4-mile (6.8 km) Championship Course from Mortlake to Putney. The crew comprised Heather Stanning – Army RC; Beth Rodford – Gloucester RC; Zoe Lee – Imperial College BC; Jessica Eddie – London RC; Helen Glover – Minerva-Bath RC; Olivia Carnegie-Brown – Oxford Brookes University BC; Tina Stiller – Tees RC; Caragh McMurtry – Reading University BC; cox Phelan Hill – Leander Club.

On 19 April 2014, Glover and Heather Stanning, coached by Paul Thompson, won the women's pair at the British rowing trials at Caversham; they took seven minutes 56.08 seconds and finished 1.14 seconds ahead of Polly Swann and Jessica Eddie. Stanning said "It was brilliant to be back racing with Helen. It feels like old times, but at the same time it's so refreshing because we've both learnt new things while we've been apart."

In May, Stanning's training schedule was reduced in intensity, causing her to be replaced by Polly Swann for the European Rowing Championships at Ada Ciganlija, Belgrade on 30 May. In their heat Swann and Glover set a new European best time of 7 minutes 9 seconds, and in the final on 1 June they lowered it to 7 minutes 3.62 seconds, finishing 5 seconds ahead of the reigning European champion Christina Grigoras and Laura Oprea of Romania. This made Glover the first British rower to hold the Olympic, World and European titles simultaneously.

Teamed with Heather Stanning in the women's coxless pair, Glover won gold at the second and third rounds of the World Rowing Cup at Lac d'Aiguebelette in France in June and Lucerne Rotsee on 13 July, which also clinched the overall title despite TeamGB not entering the first event in Australia in March. At Aiguebelette they qualified directly for the final which they completed in 7 minutes 6.9 seconds, finishing two seconds ahead of the Americans Grace Luczak and world number one ranked rower Caroline Lind. At Lucerne they again qualified directly for the final which, despite Glover's illness, they completed in 7 minutes 12.99 seconds, finishing a length ahead of the New Zealand 2 crew of Grace Prendergast and Kerri Gowler.

On 30 September, Glover, partnered by Heather Stanning, retained her world title at the 2014 World Rowing Championships held at the Bosbaan, Amsterdam. They won both their heat and the semi-final and set a new world record time of 6:50.61 in the final, breaking the 2002, record by three seconds, the 6:53.80 set by the Romanians Georgeta Andrunache and Viorica Susanu at Lucerne, Switzerland. They defeated the silver medallists, Megan Kalmoe and Kerry Simmonds of the United States, by over two seconds. Glover said: "I knew we were ready but there was so much expectation, so winning is definitely a relief."

At the British Rowing Championships on 18–19 October at Holme Pierrepont (Nottingham), Glover was part of the composite crew that won gold in both the women's fours sweep event and the quad sculls. Racing under the acronym LIMA, the crew comprised: Jessica Eddie – London RC; Zoe Lee – Imperial College BC; Helen Glover – Minerva-Bath RC; and Heather Stanning – Army RC.

At the end of 2014, Glover was officially ranked #2 female rower in the world by World Rowing, behind Caroline Lind and ahead of Meghan Musnicki.

=== 2015 ===
On 14 February 2015, Glover recorded her first victory in the GB Rowing, single scull, open-weight assessment trial held on the River Witham at Boston, Lincolnshire. She completed the 5-kilometre course in 20 minutes 16 seconds, finishing 14 seconds clear of nearest rival Katherine Grainger.

On 14 March 2015, Glover was part of the composite crew that won the Women's Eights Head of the River Race on the River Thames in London, setting a time of 18:58.6 for the 4 1/4-mile (6.8 km) Championship Course from Mortlake to Putney. The crew comprised: Heather Stanning – Army RC; Helen Glover – Minerva-Bath RC; Zoe Lee – Imperial College BC; Katherine Grainger – Marlow RC; Melanie Wilson – Imperial College BC; Caragh McMurtry – Southampton Coalporters ARC; Olivia Carnegie-Brown – Oxford Brookes University BC; Jessica Eddie – London RC; cox Phelan Hill – Leander Club.

On 19 April 2015, Glover and Heather Stanning won the women's pair at the British rowing trials at Caversham, they took 7 minutes 36.09 seconds and finished ten seconds ahead of Jessica Eddie and Louisa Reeve, followed by Katie Greves and Zoe Lee. Glover said: "We not only have great respect for each other as athletes but we are great friends on and off the water. I can genuinely say I want to win these races as much for Heather as for myself. We know how much we put into every session – it isn’t just our day job, it’s our passion."

On 31 May, Glover, partnered by Heather Stanning, retained her European title at the 2015 European Rowing Championships held in Poznań, Poland. They won both their heat and the semi-final and set a new European record time of 6:58.28 in the final. They defeated the silver medallists, Noemie Kober and Marie Le Nepvou of the Netherlands, by over six seconds. Glover said: "It's good to keep tallying them up and keep it exciting, but we don't go flat out on the start line thinking the aim of the day is to break records." Quadruple Olympic gold medallist Sir Matthew Pinsent, reporting in The Times, described Glover and Stanning as "within reach of sporting immortality".

On 21 June, Glover and Stanning won gold in the women's coxless pair at the second round of the World Rowing Cup at Lake Varese in Italy. Their winning time, 06:53.67, was half a second off the World Cup Best Time, defeating Megan Kalmoe and Kerry Simmonds of the USA 2 by 1.6 seconds, less than a length. On 12 July, they again won gold at the third round of the World Rowing Cup, at Lake Rotsee in Lucerne, which also gave them overall victory in the World Cup series, Glover's fifth series win in five years. They finished in 6:57.59 minutes, defeating Grace Prendergast and Kerri Gowler of New Zealand by 2.7 seconds.

Glover and Stanning retained their World title at the 2015 World Rowing Championships in Lac d'Aiguebelette, France, on 5 September. They won their heat in 7:04 minutes and qualified directly for the semi-final which they won in 07:06 minutes. They led the final from the start and finished in 6:52.99, 2 seconds outside their own world record, defeating the New Zealand silver medalists, Grace Prendergast and Kerri Gowler, by 3.8 seconds. Multiple Olympic gold medalist Sir Steve Redgrave said "Glover and Stanning dominate any combination that is put up against them.", whilst their coach Robin Williams said "The coach shouldn’t be that impressed I suppose, since I see them every day, but I’m just lost for words, quite stunning.". Sir David Tanner, British Rowing's performance director, declared it "one of the best GB performances of all-time ... utterly exceptional,".

After retaining her world title in 2015, Glover was officially ranked #1 female rower in the world by World Rowing, ahead of Americans Lauren Schmetterling and Amanda Polk.

On 20 November 2015, the World Rowing Federation (FISA) announced that Glover and Stanning had won the award for '2015 World Rowing Female Crew of the Year'.

=== 2016 ===
Glover and Stanning were the dominant women's pair in the GB Team Selection Trials held at the Redgrave Pinsent Rowing Lake at Caversham over 22–23 March 2016. They finished in 7 minutes 13 seconds, ten seconds ahead of Polly Swann and Jessica Eddy. Glover commented that it was "... the start of the season, rather than a peak ..." and Stanning noted their "great working combination with coach Robin (Williams)," and the "excitement of getting back into the boat each year."

On 8 May 2016, Glover and Stanning won the European Rowing Championships at Brandenburg an der Havel to retain their European title. In windy conditions they completed the final in 7 minutes 35.93 seconds, eight seconds ahead of Kerstin Hartmann and Kathrin Marchand of Germany. Glover told the BBC that "There were waves coming over my back at the start but racing here has up-skilled us. We may have cross-wind conditions at the Rio Olympics so it was good to race in them."

In the World Rowing Cup II at Lucerne, Switzerland, from 27 to 29 May, Glover and Stanning won both their heat and their semi-final but were unable to start in the final due to Stanning's sickness.

On 19 June 2016, Glover and Stanning won the final of the World Cup III event at Poznań, Poland, setting a new World Cup Best time of 6 minutes 52.79 seconds to finish 1.6 seconds ahead of the newly crowned World Cup Champions – Genevieve Behrent and Rebecca Scown of New Zealand. Although undefeated in the World Cup series, Glover and Stanning did not enter the first round at Varese, and did not start the final of round II at Lucerne due to sickness, thus they did not accrue sufficient points for overall series victory.

On 12 August, Glover and Stanning won the Olympic final in Rio de Janeiro. They completed the final in 7 minutes 18.29 seconds, over a second ahead of Genevieve Behrent and Rebecca Scown of New Zealand.

=== 2021 ===
In January 2021, it was announced that Glover had restarted training. At the 2021 European Rowing Championships in Varese, Italy, she won the gold medal in the coxless pair (W2-) teamed with Polly Swann. They won their heat in 7 minutes 8.91 seconds, the fastest qualifiers. They completed the final in 7 mins 2.73 seconds, having eventually overhauled the Romanian crew of Adriana Ailincai and Iuliana Buhus by 0.29 seconds. In interviews they noted that Swann had not raced for two years and Glover had not for five years, since the Olympic final in Brazil.

In June 2021, she and Swann were selected for the women's pair for the Summer Olympics in Tokyo, making her the first mother to row for Britain. On 28 July, they qualified for the A Final by finishing second in their semi-final. In the final on 29 July, they finished in fourth position, completing in 6 minutes 54.96 seconds, which was 4.77 seconds behind the Gold medalists, Grace Prendergast and Kerri Gowler of New Zealand and 2.86 seconds behind the bronze medalists Caileigh Filmer and Hillary Janssens of Canada. Afterwards Glover said "The reward is knowing that we crossed the line giving it our all. The frustration would have been coming away from thinking we had more and we didn't."

=== 2022 ===
In October 2022, Glover made her debut in the World Rowing Coastal Championships and won silver in the women's solo class (CW1x) of the 'Beach Sprint' finals. The event, organised by World Rowing at Saundersfoot in Pembrokeshire, Wales, was truncated on safety grounds due to severe weather, but she was ranked second behind the New Zealand Olympian Emma Twigg who took gold. The event incorporates sprinting on the beach to the water's edge, launching directly out to sea and rounding a buoy marker, before returning to shore and sprinting to the finish line.

=== 2023 ===
At the 2023 World Rowing Championships in Belgrade, she won the World Championship bronze medal in the women's coxless four.

=== 2024 ===
Glover was selected as part of the women's coxless four in the Great Britain squad for the 2024 Summer Olympics in Paris. She was also chosen to be one of Team GB's flag-bearers at the opening ceremony alongside diver Tom Daley.

== Personal life ==
On 16 September 2015, Glover and TV naturalist Steve Backshall announced their engagement on Twitter from Namibia, having met at a Sport Relief event in 2014. They married on 10 September 2016 at Piskies Cove in West Cornwall.

On 13 March 2018, it was announced that Backshall and Glover were expecting twins. On 9 April, Glover stated that one of the twins had died, but that she and Backshall were "hopeful for the remaining baby to arrive this summer". On 24 July 2018, she announced on social media that she had given birth to a boy. On 16 January 2020, she gave birth to twins (a boy and a girl).

== Media appearance ==
Glover was the focus of a BBC TV documentary, Helen Glover: Mother of All Comebacks, broadcast on 19 July 2021, prior to the 2020 Tokyo Olympics. It covered her return to training after having children and four years out of the sport.

== Honours ==
Glover was appointed Member of the Order of the British Empire (MBE) in the 2013 New Year Honours for services to rowing, which she received from Queen Elizabeth II at Windsor Castle on 10 April 2013.

In August 2012, her Olympic victory was marked by Royal Mail which issued a commemorative postage stamp and painted a post box gold on Quay Street, Penzance (50.1161°N 5.5310°W).

On 26 June 2013, she was awarded a Blue Peter badge, and on 26 September 2014, she was also awarded a Blue Peter gold badge.

In August 2013, fuchsia "Helen Glover" was awarded Certificate 8162 by the American Fuchsia Society. It was hybridized by W.E.Negus (Ernie) of Hayle Cornwall, and is described as a single flower containing a light violet corolla, a light rose tube and a yellowish white sepal redolent of Cornish ice cream.

On 27 March 2016, Glover and Stanning presented winners' trophies to the Cambridge men's and Oxford women's crews in the Varsity Boat Races.

Glover, along with husband Steve Backshall, is an ambassador for The Scout Association.

Glover was appointed Officer of the Order of the British Empire (OBE) in the 2025 New Year Honours for services to rowing.

== Achievements ==
2009

- 1st – Bernard Churcher Trophy, Henley Women's Regatta, senior single scull.

2010

- 3rd – Women's Eights Head of the River Race, River Thames, Reading University eight.
- 5th – GB Rowing Team Senior Trials, single scull.
- 9th – World Rowing Cup, Bled, coxless pair.
- 5th – World Rowing Cup, Munich, coxless pair.
- 2nd – 2010 World Rowing Championships, Lake Karapiro, New Zealand, coxless pair.

2011

- 1st – GB Rowing Team Senior Trials, Eton-Dorney, coxless pair.
- 1st – World Rowing Cup, Munich, coxless pair.
- 1st – World Rowing Cup, Lucerne, coxless pair.
- 2nd – 2011 World Rowing Championships, Lake Bled Slovenia, coxless pair.

2012

- 1st – GB Rowing Team Trials, Eton Dorney, 10–11 March, coxless pair.
- 1st – World Rowing Cup, Belgrade, coxless pair.
- 1st – World Rowing Cup, Lucerne, coxless pair.
- 1st – World Rowing Cup, Munich, coxless pair.
- 1st – 2012 Summer Olympics, London, 1 August, Coxless pair. Olympic record time.

2013

- 1st – GB Rowing Team Senior Trials, Redgrave Pinsent Rowing Lake, single scull.
- 1st – World Rowing Cup, Penrith Lakes, Australia, March, coxless pair.
- 1st – World Rowing Cup, Eton Dorney, London, June, coxless pair.
- 1st – World Rowing Cup, Lucerne, July, coxless pair.
- 1st – Henley Royal Regatta, Princess Grace Challenge Cup, quadruple scull.
- 1st – 2013 World Rowing Championships, Chungju South Korea, 31 August, coxless pair.

2014

- 1st – Women's Eights Head of the River Race, River Thames, 17 March, women's eight.
- 1st – GB Rowing Team Senior Trials, Redgrave Pinsent Rowing Lake, 19 April, coxless pair.
- 1st – European Rowing Championships, Ada Ciganlija, Belgrade, 30 May, coxless pair.
- 1st – World Rowing Cup, Lac d'Aiguebelette, France, June, coxless pair.
- 1st – World Rowing Cup, Lucerne Rotsee, 13 July, coxless pair.
- 1st – 2014 World Rowing Championships, Bosbaan, Amsterdam, 30 August, coxless pair. World-record time.
- 1st – British Rowing Championships, Holme Pierrepont, 18–19 October, women's fours.
- 1st – British Rowing Championships, Holme Pierrepont, 18–19 October, quad sculls.

2015

- 1st – GB Rowing Open-weight trial, Boston, Lincolnshire, 14 February, single scull.
- 1st – Women's Eights Head of the River Race, River Thames, 14 March, women's eight.
- 1st – GB Rowing Team Senior Trials, Redgrave Pinsent Rowing Lake, 19 April, coxless pair.
- 1st – European Rowing Championships, Poznań, Poland, 31 May, coxless pair.
- 1st – World Rowing Cup, Lake Varese, 21 June, coxless pair.
- 1st – World Rowing Cup, Lucerne Rotsee, 12 July, coxless pair.
- 1st – 2015 World Rowing Championships, Lac d'Aiguebelette, France, 5 September, coxless pair.

2016

- 1st – GB Rowing Team Senior Trials, Redgrave Pinsent Rowing Lake, 22–23 March, coxless pair.
- 1st – European Rowing Championships, Brandenburg an der Havel, Germany, 8 May, coxless pair.
- 1st – Heat and semi-final, World Rowing Cup 11, Lucerne, May, coxless pair. (Did not start Final due to sickness).
- 1st – World Rowing Cup III, Poznań Poland, 19 June, coxless pair.
- 1st – 2016 Summer Olympics, Rio de Janeiro, 12 August, coxless pair.

2021

- 1st – 2021 European Rowing Championships, Varese, 11 April, coxless pair with Polly Swann.
- 4th - 2020 Summer Olympics in Tokyo, 29 July, coxless pair with Polly Swann.

== See also ==
- 2012 Olympics gold post boxes in the United Kingdom
- Rowing at the 2012 Summer Olympics – Women's coxless pair
- Rowing at the 2016 Summer Olympics – Women's coxless pair
- Rowing at the 2020 Summer Olympics – Women's coxless pair

Olympic Games
Preceded by Hannah Mills; Moe Sbihi	Flagbearer for United Kingdom (with Tom Daley); París 2024	Succeeded by Incumbent
