= Polly Swann =

British rower

Personal information
- Full name: Polly Ann M. Swann
- Nationality: British
- Born: 5 June 1988 (age 38) Lancaster, Lancashire, England
- Height: 1.86 m (6 ft 1 in)

Sport
- Country: Great Britain
- Sport: Rowing
- Event: Coxless pair
- Club: Leander Club
- Partner(s): Jo Cook (2012); Helen Glover (2013–2014, 2020-2021)
- Coached by: Robin Williams (2013–2014)
Medal record
Women's rowing
Representing Great Britain
Olympic Games
Silver medal – second place	2016 Rio de Janeiro	W8+
World Championships
Gold medal – first place	2013 Chungju, Korea	W2-
World Rowing Cup
Gold medal – first place	2013 Sydney	W2-
Gold medal – first place	2013 Eton Dorney	W2-
Gold medal – first place	2013 Lucerne Rotsee	W2-
European Championships
Gold medal – first place	2014 Belgrade	W2−
Gold medal – first place	2021 Varese	W2−
European University Championships
Gold medal – first place	2009	Coxless pair
Silver medal – second place	2009	Women's 8
Amsterdam International Regatta
Gold medal – first place	2010 Amsterdam	u23 Quad

Polly Ann M. Swann (born 5 June 1988) is a British rower and a member of the Great Britain Rowing Team. She is a former World and European champion in the women's coxless pairs, having won the 2013 World Rowing Championships at Chungju in Korea, and the 2014 European Rowing Championships at Belgrade, Serbia with her partner Helen Glover. At the 2016 Summer Olympics she won a silver medal in the women's eight.

In the 2020 coronavirus pandemic she took a break from rowing to work as a doctor at St John's Hospital, Livingston.

In 2021 she regained the European Coxless Pair title in Varese, Italy, with Helen Glover. She and Glover finished fourth in the Summer Olympics in Tokyo.

== Early life ==
Polly Swann is the elder of two children born to Sally and David Swann, a doctor. She was born in Lancaster, England, but when she was three weeks old the family moved to Edinburgh, Scotland, where she was raised and educated. She attended George Heriot's School where, at the age of 14, she started rowing on the Union Canal. She went on to study medicine at the University of Edinburgh until taking a sabbatical in 2010 to concentrate on rowing. In 2013 she studied for a degree in global health policy at the University of London.

== Career ==
=== 2009 ===
At the European University Sports Association (EUSA) Championships Swann won a gold medal in the women's pair and a silver medal in the women's eight.

She represented Scotland at the Home International Regatta held at Holme Pierrepont National Watersports Centre, England, winning gold medals in both the women's pair and the women's eight.

=== 2010 ===
In 2010, she rowed in the quadruple sculls at the World Rowing U23 Championships in Brest, Belarus and finished fourth. This success gave her the impetus to take a sabbatical from her University Medical Degree course, to move to Henley and concentrate full-time on rowing.

She won gold in the 'Under 23 quadruple sculls' at Amsterdam International Regatta in June.

At the Henley Women's Regatta in June she won the Avril Vellacott Cup for Elite Coxless Fours.

She was a member of the Scotland Team for the Commonwealth Rowing Championships in Welland, Canada.

=== 2011 ===
Swann was a member of the women's eight at the 2011 European Rowing Championships at Plovdiv, Bulgaria, where they finished fourth.

At the GB Rowing Team Senior Trials at Eton/Dorney, Swann was teamed with Monica Relph in the women's coxless pair and finished fifth.

At the Henley Royal Regatta she reached the final of the Remenham Challenge Cup, where the GB Senior Women's eight were defeated by Princeton Training Center, U.S.A.

=== 2012 ===
Swann and Jo Cook finished fourth in the women's pairs at the GB Rowing Team Senior Trials at Eton Dorney in March. Back injury contributed to her missing selection for the Olympics rowing team.

=== 2013 ===
Teamed with Helen Glover in the women's coxless pair under the tutelage of Robin Williams, Swann completed a clean sweep of three victories at the World Rowing Cup, winning gold at Penrith Lakes, Australia in March; Eton Dorney, London in June; and Lucerne Rotsee in July.

In July 2013, at the Henley Royal Regatta she teamed up with Victoria Meyer-Laker, Frances Houghton and Helen Glover to win the Princess Grace Challenge Cup for women's quadruple scull. Competing as Leander Club and Minerva Bath Rowing Club they completed the final course in 6 minutes 59 seconds.

On 31 August, teamed with Helen Glover in the women's coxless pair, she became the world champion at the 2013 World Rowing Championships at Chungju in the Republic of Korea. They completed the final in 7 mins 22.82 secs, finishing ahead of Roxana Cogianu and Nicoleta Albu of Romania, and having overhauled the American boat which had led briefly in the early stages.

In December 2013 Glover and Swann were voted as 'Team of the Year' by the SportsSister organisation, additionally Glover won the 'Readers Choice' vote. Glover and Swann also received the chairman's award from the Sports Journalists' Association (SJA).

=== 2014 ===
On 19 April 2014 Swann was teamed with Jessica Eddie for the women's pair at the British rowing trials at Caversham, where they finished 1.14 seconds behind Helen Glover and Heather Stanning. In May, Swann was selected to partner Helen Glover in the women's coxless pair at the European Rowing Championships at Ada Ciganlija, Belgrade on 30 May. In the heat they set a new European best time of 7 minutes 9 seconds, and in the final on 1 June they lowered it to 7 minutes 3.62 seconds, finishing 5 seconds ahead of the reigning European champion Cristina Grigoras and Laura Oprea of Romania.

=== 2016 ===
She won a silver medal in the women's eight at the 2016 Summer Olympics.

=== 2019 ===
Having taken time away from rowing to complete her medical studies at the University of Edinburgh, Swann returned to international competition after being selected in the W4- for the Poznań World Cup in June 2019.

At the 2019 World Rowing Championships in Ottensheim, Austria, her team won the "B" final of the coxless 4 (W4-) and qualified for the 2020 Olympics.

=== 2020 ===
During the coronavirus pandemic Swann took a break from rowing to work as a Junior Doctor at St John's Hospital, Livingston.

=== 2021 ===
At the 2021 European Rowing Championships in Varese, Italy, she won the gold medal in the coxless pair (W2-) teamed with Helen Glover. They completed the final in 7 mins 2.73 seconds, eventually overhauling the Romanian crew of Adriana Ailincai and Iuliana Buhus by 0.29 seconds.

In June 2021, Glover and Swann were named as the women's pair for the Summer Olympics in Tokyo, making Glover the first mother to row for Britain. On 28 July they qualified for the A Final by finishing second in their semi-final. In the final on 29 July they finished in fourth position, completing in 6 minutes 54.96 seconds, which was 4.77 seconds behind the Gold medalists, Grace Prendergast and Kerri Gowler of New Zealand and 2.86 seconds behind the bronze medalists Caileigh Filmer and Hillary Janssens of Canada. Afterwards Glover said "The reward is knowing that we crossed the line giving it our all. The frustration would have been coming away from thinking we had more and we didn’t."

== See also ==
- Rowing at the 2020 Summer Olympics – Women's coxless pair
