= Victoria Meyer-Laker =

British rower (born 1988)

Personal information
- Nickname: Vicki
- Nationality: British
- Born: 18 March 1988 (age 38) Barnstaple, Devon, England, UK
- Height: 1.91 m (6 ft 3 in)

Sport
- Country: United Kingdom
- Sport: Rowing
- Partner: Frances Houghton
Medal record
Women's rowing
Representing Great Britain
World Rowing Cup
Bronze medal – third place	2012 Belgrade	W8+
Bronze medal – third place	2013 Sydney	W2x
Gold medal – first place	2013 Eton Dorney, London	W2x
European Championships
Bronze medal – third place	2012 Varese	W8+
- Updated on 10 July 2013

Victoria Meyer-Laker (born 18 March 1988) is a British professional rower and a member of the Great Britain Rowing Team.

== Career ==
=== 2009 ===
In 2009, she rowed in the British eight and was 7th in her first International regatta, the European Championships in Brest, Belarus.

=== 2010 ===
In 2010, she was 7th in the Women's quadruple sculls at the World Rowing U23 Championships in Brest, Belarus.

=== 2011 ===
Meyer-Laker competed in the British women's eight at the 2011 European Rowing Championships in Plovdiv, Bulgaria, and finished 4th.

=== 2012 ===
At the 2012 European Rowing Championships in Varese, Italy, she won a bronze medal with the women's eight.

At the World Rowing Cup in Belgrade, she won a bronze medal in the women's eight.

=== 2013 ===
In April 2013 Meyer-Laker finished sixth in the women's single scull at the GB Rowing Team Trials held at the Redgrave Pinsent Rowing Lake, Caversham, Berkshire.

Teamed with Frances Houghton in the women's double scull, she won a bronze medal at the World Rowing Cup event at Penrith Lakes, Australia in January, and a gold medal at Eton Dorney, London in June. At the third round in Lucerne they finished fourth.

In July at the Henley Royal Regatta she teamed up with Polly Swann, Frances Houghton and Helen Glover to win the Princess Grace Challenge Cup for women's quadruple scull. Competing as Leander Club and Minerva Bath Rowing Club they completed the final course in 6 minutes 59 seconds.
