= Oldfield School =

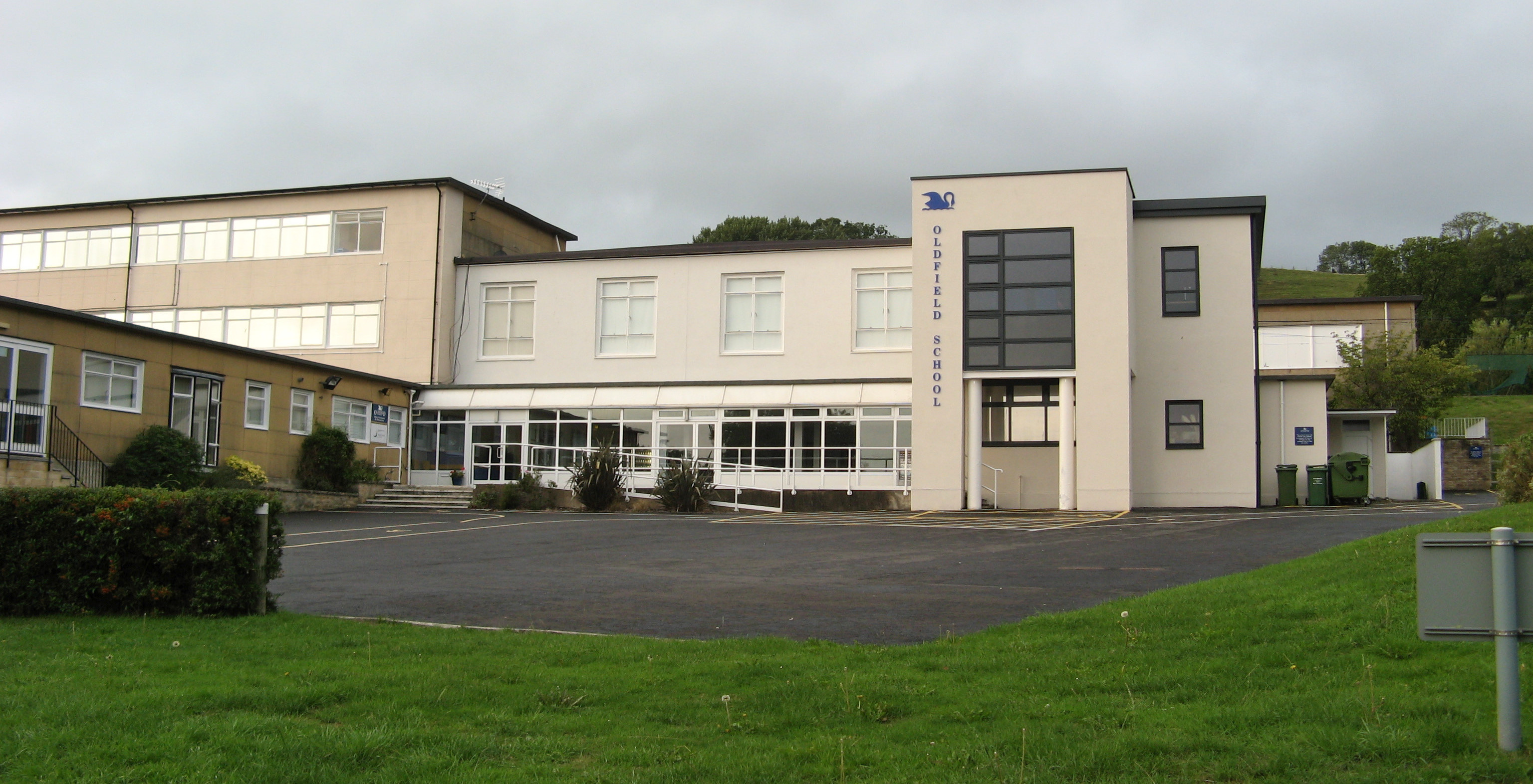

Location
- Kelston Road; Bath, BA1 9AB; England; 51.3930°N 2.4050°W

Information
- Type: Academy
- Established: 1892; 134 years ago
- Local authority: Bath and North East Somerset
- Department for Education URN: 136483 Tables
- Ofsted: Reports
- Head teacher: Andy Greenhough
- Gender: All
- Age: 11 to 18
- Enrolment: 1,287 (November 2026)
- Houses: Minerva, Apollo, Maia, Neptune
- Colours: Navy and White
- Website: www.oldfieldschool.com

Oldfield School is a secondary school, with a sixth form, in Newbridge, Bath, England. Since February 2011, the school has had academy status, meaning that it operates outside the control of the local authority. Prior to 2012 the main school was for girls only, with a co-educational sixth form. In November 2026, the school had 1,287 pupils.

== History ==
Oldfield School was founded in 1892 to serve the city of Bath; in 1959 the school moved from the city centre to agricultural land on the western outskirts of the city, overlooking the River Avon valley, and now attracts pupils from a wider area including the eastern outskirts of Bristol.

Recent buildings include a drama studio, dance studio, sports hall, science block and a new teaching block for Mathematics and Humanities. Some expansion classroom blocks date from the 1970s and 1980s. The school has on-site playing fields.

In the 1990s and early 2000s the school took an early opportunity to gain more independence from local authority control by becoming a grant-maintained school and then a foundation school.

In 2010 the school applied for academy status using the Academies Act in order to remove itself from local authority control and avoid becoming co-educational, becoming an academy in February 2011. Ultimately, under pressure from Bath and North East Somerset Council which offered to provide £1.85 million for conversion works, the school decided to become co-educational from 2012.

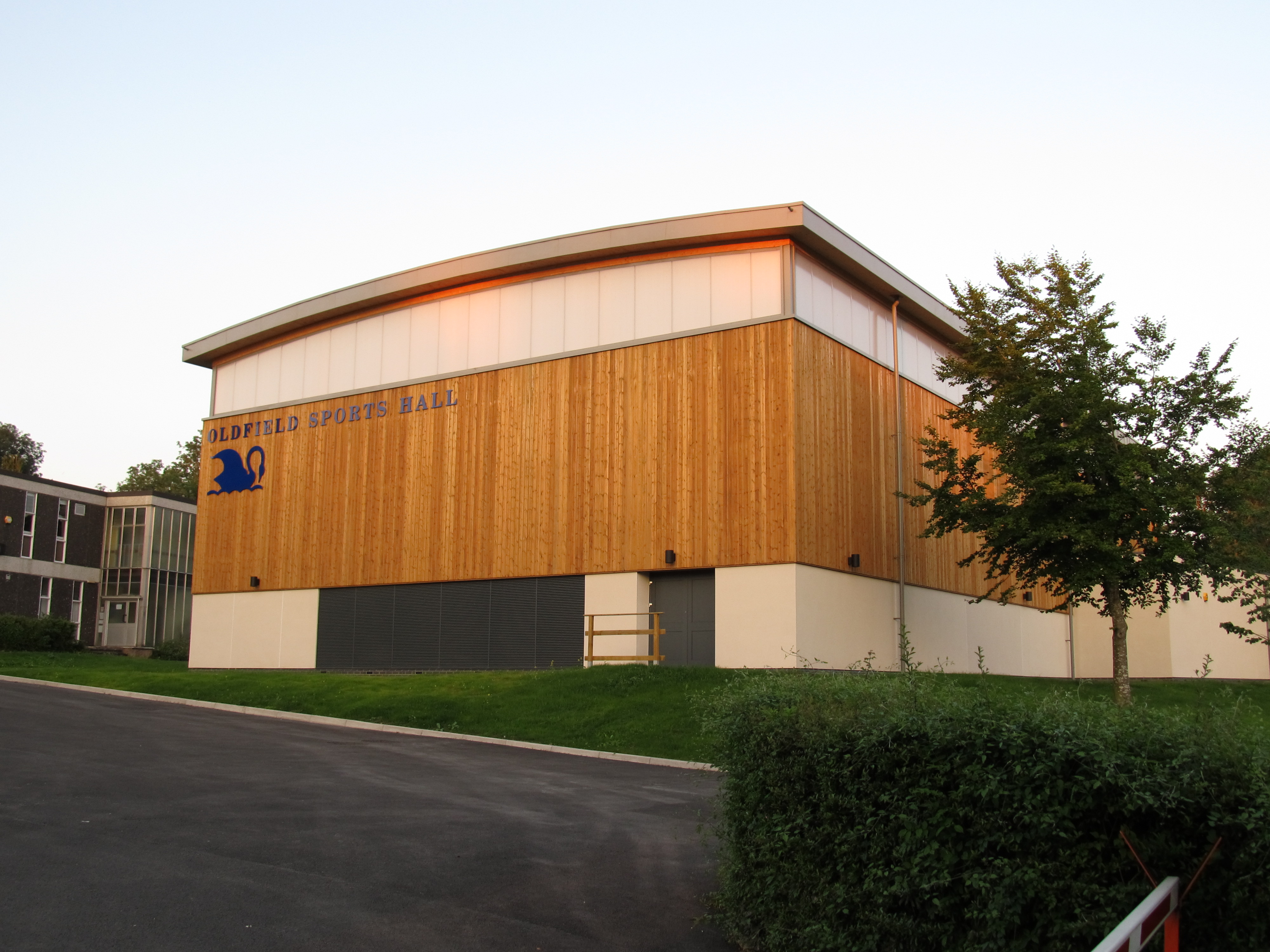
Sports hall opened by Helen Glover in 2012

Recent PE teacher Helen Glover won the gold medal for the women's coxless pairs at the 2012 Summer Olympics. She took up rowing in 2008 whilst teaching at the school and trained at the Minerva Bath Rowing Club nearby. In November 2012 she returned to the school to open the £1.85 million sports centre.

=== Penn House ===
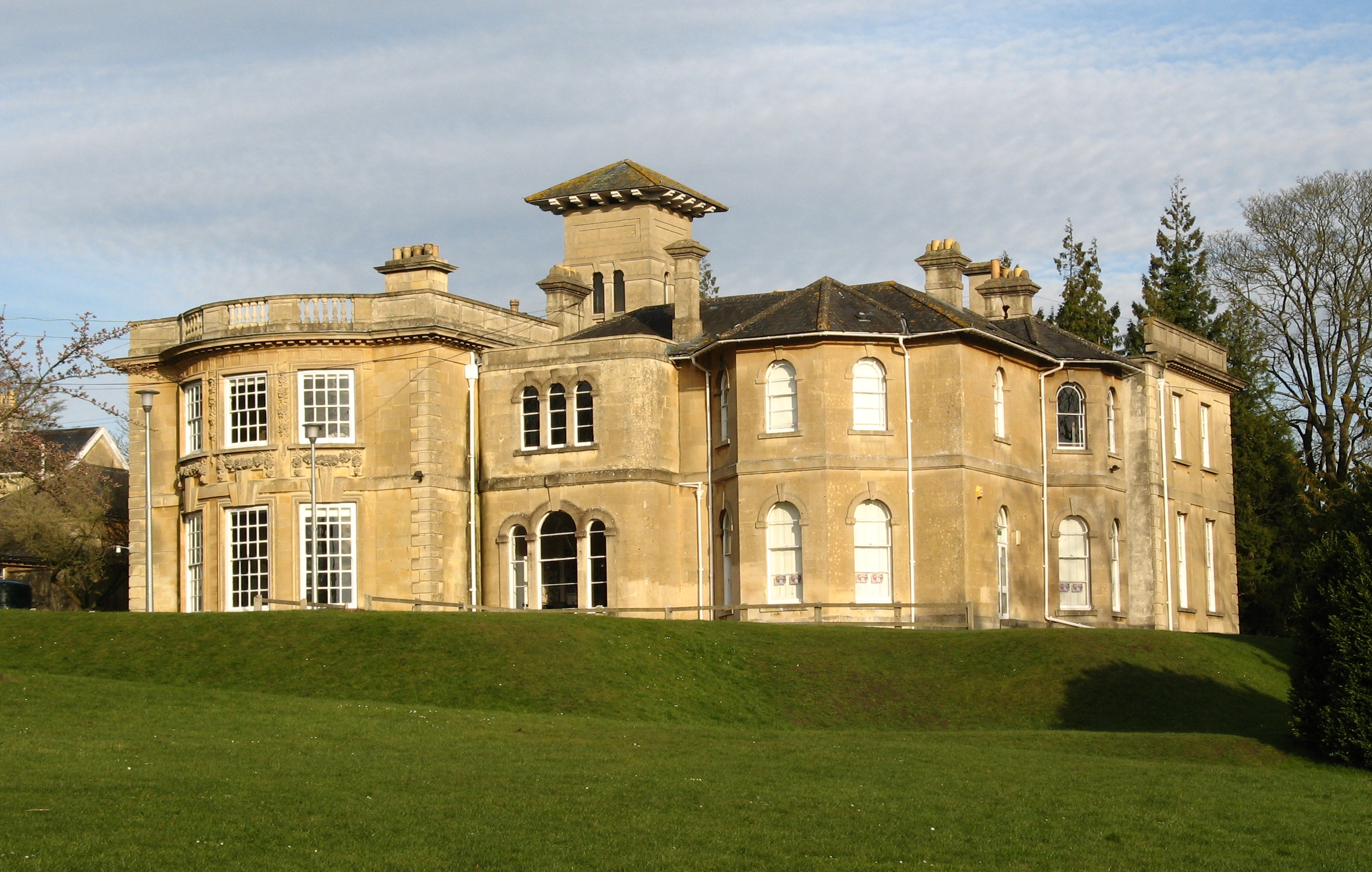
Penn House

Penn House, or Penn Hill House, dates from the mid-1800s. It has two storeys faced with limestone ashlar, and Welsh slate roofs; a small belvedere tower with a pyramidal roof rises above the house. Originally an Italianate villa, the building was extended to the left and rear in Baroque style in 1904 and 1924, to designs of Reginald Blomfield. Both phases of extension were under the ownership of Sir Ernest Pitman, son of Isaac Pitman (who developed Pitman shorthand) and father of Isaac James Pitman (inventor of the Initial Teaching Alphabet). The house was designated as Grade II listed in 1994.

Oldfield School was built on land to the west of the house in 1959. In the 1960s, Penn House was a separate special school, but it was later absorbed into Oldfield School. Today the house is largely used as sixth form accommodation and by the English and Social Sciences departments.

== Academics ==
The school is a National College for School Leadership National Support School and a former Headteacher is a National Leader of Education.

== Uniform ==
The school uniform consists of a navy blue jacket with a white logo of a swan. A tie should be worn and the grey jumper is optional. A white shirt must be worn under the jumper. Students in years 7, 8, 9, 10 and 11 must wear navy blue trousers or skirt. Shoes must be black and leather with no clear logo.

== 2013 breakdown in management and governance ==
In December 2013, Ofsted made a surprise inspection to investigate concerns over child safeguarding, following some complaints. Ofsted concluded that safeguarding procedures met requirements, but the school governors had an inadequate understanding of their statutory responsibilities, were overly reliant on information provided by the headteacher, and an external review of governance should be undertaken. A fuller Ofsted report has not been published, despite a petition of over 1,000 signatures. The Bath Chronicle, which had seen a copy of the fuller report, reported that it "would have regraded the school rated as outstanding in 2012, and which contains more serious criticisms", but was limited in what it could report for legal reasons.

In March 2014, in the week a Department for Education review team visited the school, Stuart Weatherall was appointed chair of governors, with the previous chair becoming vice-chair of governors. The NASUWT teachers' union called for the resignation of the headteacher following the leaking of the unpublished 2013 Ofsted report which accused the headteacher of "managing staff through a culture of fear, intimidation and bullying".

On 30 April 2014 the headteacher resigned. On the same day it was announced that a pre-warning notice letter had been issued by the Secretary of State for Education to the governors, requiring major improvements after a serious breakdown in the way the academy had been managed and governed. The remedial actions recommended by the Education Funding Agency included the establishment of an Interim Academy Board, to take over the powers and functions of the governors for a period of time. In July 2015 the Interim Academy Board was dissolved, and a normal governance regime resumed.
