= Rowing at the 2016 Summer Olympics – Women's eight =

Women's eight at the Games of the XXXI Olympiad
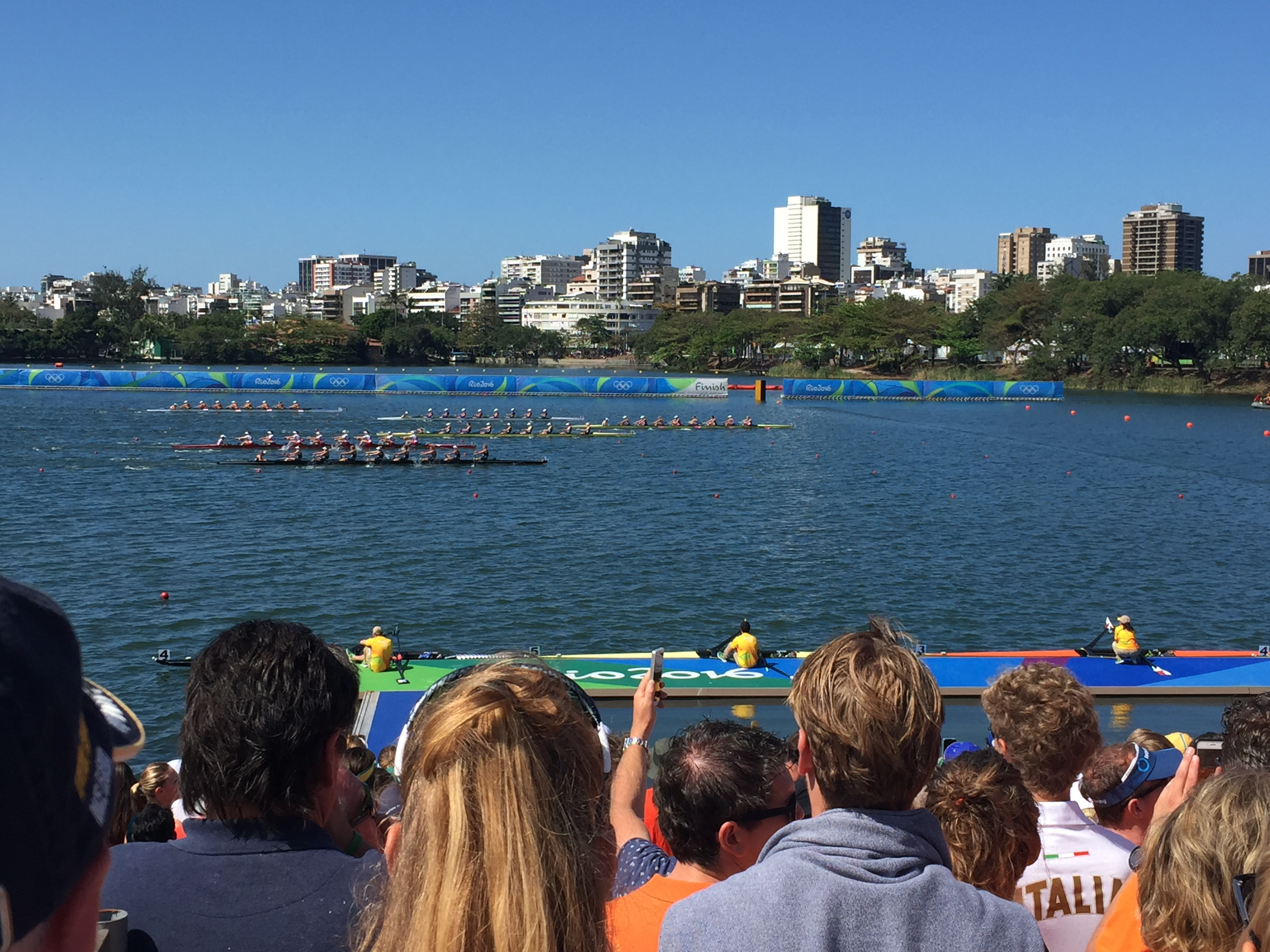
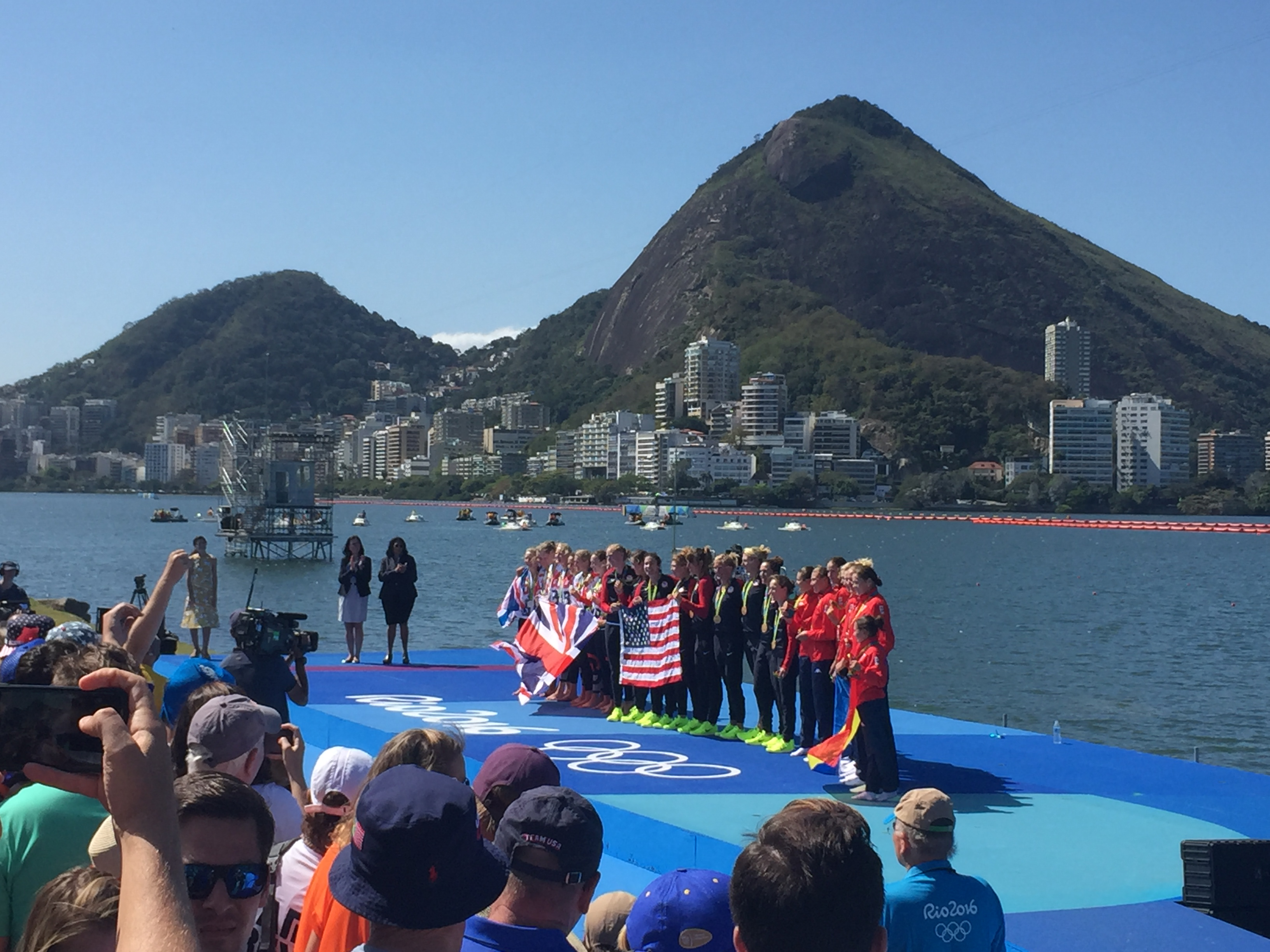
- The finish of the race and medal ceremony
- Venue: Lagoa Rodrigo de Freitas
- Date: 8–13 August 2016
- Competitors: 56 from 7 nations
- Winning time: 6:01.49

Medalists
1st place, gold medalist(s)		Emily Regan; Kerry Simmonds; Amanda Polk; Lauren Schmetterling; Tessa Gobbo; Meghan Musnicki; Elle Logan; Amanda Elmore; Katelin Snyder	United States
2nd place, silver medalist(s)		Katie Greves; Melanie Wilson; Frances Houghton; Polly Swann; Jessica Eddie; Olivia Carnegie-Brown; Karen Bennett; Zoe Lee; Zoe de Toledo	Great Britain
3rd place, bronze medalist(s)		Roxana Cogianu; Ioana Strungaru; Mihaela Petrilă; Iuliana Popa; Mădălina Beres; Laura Oprea; Adelina Boguș; Andreea Boghian; Daniela Druncea	Romania

The Women's eight competition at the 2016 Summer Olympics in Rio de Janeiro took place at Lagoa Rodrigo de Freitas.

== Schedule ==
All times are Brasília Time (UTC−3)

Date	Time	Round
Monday, 8 August 2016	8:50	Heats
Wednesday, 10 August 2016	9:50	Repechage
Saturday, 13 August 2016	11:06	Final

== Results ==
=== Heats ===
==== Heat 1 ====
Rank	Rowers	Country	Time	Notes
1	Regan, Simmonds, Polk, Schmetterling, Gobbo, Musnicki, Logan, Elmore, Snyder	United States	6:06.34	FA
2	Van Dord, Belderbos, Rustenburg, Van Veen, Hogerwerf, Souwer, Lanz, Van Rooijen, Noort	Netherlands	6:14.36	R
3	Cogianu, Strungaru, Petrilă, Popa, Bereș, Oprea, Boguș, Boghian, Druncea	Romania	6:16.24	R
4	Albert, Morrison, Hagan, Volker, Goodman, Aldersey, Stephan, Sutherland, Banting	Australia	6:22.68	R

==== Heat 2 ====
Rank	Rowers	Country	Time	Notes
1	Greves, Wilson, Houghton, Swann, Eddie, Carnegie-Brown, Bennett, Lee, De Toledo	Great Britain	6:09.52	FA
2	Pratt, Scown, Tew, Bevan, Prendergast, Gowler, Behrent, Dyke, Turner	New Zealand	6:12.05	R
3	Nurse, Roman, von Seydlitz-Kurzbach, Roper, Wilkinson, Grainger, Mastracci, Filmer, Thompson-Willie	Canada	6:12.44	R

=== Repechage ===
Rank	Rowers	Country	Time	Notes
1	Nurse, Roman, von Seydlitz-Kurzbach, Roper, Wilkinson, Grainger, Mastracci, Filmer, Thompson-Willie	Canada	6:28.07	FA
2	Cogianu, Strungaru, Petrilă, Popa, Bereș, Oprea, Boguș, Boghian, Druncea	Romania	6:32.63	FA
3	Pratt, Scown, Tew, Bevan, Prendergast, Gowler, Behrent, Dyke, Turner	New Zealand	6:34.90	FA
4	Van Dord, Belderbos, Rustenburg, Van Veen, Hogerwerf, Souwer, Lanz, Van Rooijen, Noort	Netherlands	6:35.96	FA
5	Albert, Morrison, Hagan, Volker, Goodman, Aldersey, Stephan, Sutherland, Banting	Australia	6:40.45	

=== Final ===
Rank	Rowers	Country	Time	Notes
1st place, gold medalist(s)	Regan, Simmonds, Polk, Schmetterling, Gobbo, Musnicki, Logan, Elmore, Snyder	United States	6:01.49	
2nd place, silver medalist(s)	Greves, Wilson, Houghton, Swann, Eddie, Carnegie-Brown, Bennett, Lee, De Toledo	Great Britain	6:03.98	
3rd place, bronze medalist(s)	Cogianu, Strungaru, Petrilă, Popa, Bereș, Oprea, Boguș, Boghian, Druncea	Romania	6:04.10	
4	Pratt, Scown, Tew, Bevan, Prendergast, Gowler, Behrent, Dyke, Turner	New Zealand	6:05.48	
5	Nurse, Roman, von Seydlitz-Kurzbach, Roper, Wilkinson, Grainger, Mastracci, Filmer, Thompson-Willie	Canada	6:06.04	
6	Van Dord, Belderbos, Rustenburg, Van Veen, Hogerwerf, Souwer, Lanz, Van Rooijen, Noort	Netherlands	6:08.37	
