= Tessa Gobbo =

American rower

Personal information
- Born: December 8, 1990 (age 35) Keene, New Hampshire, U.S.
Medal record
Women's rowing
Representing the United States
Olympic Games
Gold medal – first place	2016 Rio de Janeiro	W8+
World Championships
Gold medal – first place	2013 Chungju	W4-
Gold medal – first place	2015 Aiguebelette	W8+
Silver medal – second place	2014 Amsterdam	W4-

Tessa Gobbo (born December 8, 1990) is an American rower. She attended Northfield Mount Hermon School in Massachusetts and Brown University. She won the gold medal in the eight at the 2015 World Rowing Championships and the 2016 Rio Olympics representing the United States.
