= Kayla Pratt =

New Zealand rower (born 1991)

Personal information
- Born: 27 May 1991 (age 35) Auckland, New Zealand
- Education: Epsom Girls' Grammar School
- Height: 178 cm (5 ft 10 in)
- Weight: 71 kg (157 lb)

Sport
- Club: Auckland
Medal record
Women's rowing
Representing New Zealand
World Championships
Silver medal – second place	2015 Aiguebelette	W8+
Gold medal – first place	2014 Amsterdam	W4−
Bronze medal – third place	2013 Chungjiu	W2-
U23 World Championships
Gold medal – first place	2012 Trakai	W2-
Silver medal – second place	2011 Amsterdam	W8+

Kayla Pratt (born 27 May 1991) is a New Zealand rower. She won the gold medal in the coxless four at the 2014 World Rowing Championships in Amsterdam. With the women's eight, she came fourth at the 2016 Rio Olympics.
