= Robin Williams (rowing coach) =

British rowing coach

Robin Williams MBE (born 5 April 1959) is a Welsh professional rowing coach for Team GB. He represented Great Britain at six world championships, winning silver and bronze medals. He was coach to the Cambridge University Boat Club for 11 years winning seven Varsity Boat races. As of 2014 he is coach to the former World record holders and Olympic, World, World Cup and European champions of the women's coxless pair, variously rowed by Helen Glover, Heather Stanning and Polly Swann, achieving an unbroken sequence of twelve gold medal victories at world level.

== Early life and education ==
Born in Anglesey, Wales he learned to row on the River Wye whilst at Monmouth School (Monmouth Rowing Club), and then attended University College London where he joined the University of London Boat Club.

== Career ==
From 1983 to 1987 Williams was an advertising manager for the Financial Times, plus working in the Caribbean as a salvage diver. In 2010 Williams set up Totally Outdoors in Henley, selling outdoor clothing and rowing equipment.

=== Rowing ===
Williams rowed for University of London Boat Club and gained his first Great Britain vest in 1981, an international career that lasted 10 years until 1991. He won a gold medal at the Match des Seniors (Under 23 Championships) in 1981 and Silver and Bronze at the 1988 and 1989 World Rowing Championships. He has also won three Henley Royal regatta medals and 5 Lucerne regatta medals and competed at the 1986 Commonwealth Games.

=== Coaching ===
In the early '90s, whilst rowing for the London Rowing Club, he also got involved with management and coaching, working as part-time coach for three years for the Great Britain lightweights. Williams stated that "It was a good springboard for a coaching career because we had GB rowers there. We won a lot of stuff at all levels and I think that got me established as a coach." In 1996 he coached the lightweight men's four to 10th place at the Olympics in Atlanta.

In 1994 he became coach to the Cambridge University Boat Club having rejected a similar position at the Oxford University Boat Club. Over the next 11 years his crew won the annual Boat Race seven times.

From 2005 until 2009 he coached the men's lightweight crews for Team GB at Henley on Thames and the Redgrave Pinsent Rowing Lake in Caversham, Berkshire. In 2007 the lightweight four won gold at the World Championships in Munich-Oberschleißheim, and in 2008 they came fifth at the Olympics in Beijing.

In July 2010 he began coaching Helen Glover and Heather Stanning in the women's coxless pair, such that by November they had improved from their world rankings of 16 and 17 to take the silver medal at the 2010 World Rowing Championships in New Zealand. In 2011 he took them to within 0.08 seconds of the gold medal at the 2011 World Rowing Championships in Slovenia.

In 2012 Glover and Stanning won the gold medal in the Women's coxless pair at the London Olympics. In 2013 he led Glover and Polly Swann to become World champions at Chungju, South Korea. In 2014 he led Glover and Swann to the gold medal at the European Rowing Championships at Ada Ciganlija, Belgrade on 30 May. This was followed by Glover and Stanning winning the overall title in the World Rowing Cup and then becoming world champions at the 2014 World Rowing Championships held at the Bosbaan, Amsterdam. They won both their heat and the semi-final and set a new world record time of 6:50.61 in the final, breaking the 2002 time by three seconds. As of 2014 this represents an unbroken sequence of twelve gold medal victories at world level.

== Family life ==
Since 2005 Williams has lived in Henley with his wife Anna and their two children, Lizzie and Mathew.

== Honours ==
Williams was appointed Member of the Order of the British Empire (MBE) in the 2013 New Year Honours for services to rowing. In 2016, he was named BBC Wales coach of the year.
