= Sarah Banting =

Australian rowing coxswain

Personal information
- Born: 9 November 1993 (age 31); Fitzroy, Melbourne, Victoria, Australia
- Height: 165 cm (5 ft 5 in)
- Weight: 60 kg (132 lb)

Sport
- Country: Australia
- Sport: Rowing
- Event: Women's Eight (W8+)
- Club: Mercantile Rowing Club
- Coached by: Andrew Randell

Achievements and titles
- National finals: Queen's Cup 2015 – 2016

Sarah Banting (born 9 November 1993) is an Australian rowing coxswain. She has won national championships and competed in the women's eight event at the 2016 Summer Olympics.

== Club and state rowing ==
Raised in Melbourne, Banting's senior rowing was from the Mercantile Rowing Club.

Banting was first selected to represent Victoria in the women's youth eight in 2013 contesting the Bicentennial Cup at the Interstate Regatta within the Australian Rowing Championships. In 2015 and 2016 she coxed successful Victorian senior women's eights who won the Queen's Cup at the Interstate Regatta within the Australian Rowing Championships.

== International representative rowing ==
Banting's national representative debut came in 2013 when she steered the Australian eight at the 2013 World Rowing U23 Championships in Linz to a fourth placing in the final. The following year she was again in the stern of the Australian U23 eight when they achieved a fourth placing at the 2014 World Rowing U23 Championships in Varese.

In 2015 Banting took the rudder of senior women's eight. She coxed that crew at two Rowing World Cups in Europe and then at the 2015 World Rowing Championships in Aiguebelette. They failed to make the A final and finished in overall eight place.

Banting was the cox of the Australian women's eight which initially missed qualification for the 2016 Rio Olympics but received a late call up following the Russian drug scandal. WADA had discovered Russian state sponsored drug testing violations and the IOC acted to protect clean athletes and set strict entry guidelines for Russian athletes resulting in most of their rowers and nearly all of their crews being withdrawn from the Olympic regatta. The Australian crew had dispersed two months earlier after their failure to qualify but reconvened, travelled at the last minute to Rio and borrowed a shell. They finished last in their heat, last in the repechage and were eliminated.
