= Meaghan Volker =

Australian rower (born 1990)

Personal information
- Born: 20 October 1990 (age 34)

Sport
- Sport: Rowing

Meaghan Volker (born 20 October 1990) is an Australian rower. She competed in the women's eight event at the 2016 Summer Olympics.

== Club and state rowing ==
Volker participated in Little Athletics and was a Tasmanian state champion in high-jump before she was a teenager. She was educated at the Friends' School, Hobart where her father Peter was a rowing coach and she took up the sport at age fourteen. Her senior club rowing was from the Buckingham Rowing Club in Tasmania from where she was identified in a Tasmanian Institute of Sport's talent identification program.

In 2012 received an invitation to travel to US and to join the rowing program at UCLA. She was twice named an All American rower, 2nd Class in 2013 and 1st Class in 2014. Volker returned to Australia in 2015 and was selected in the Tasmanian state and the national women's eights. She received a scholarship to the AIS and studied in Civil Engineering.

Volker was selected to represent Tasmania in the 2015 senior women's eight contesting the Queen's Cup at the Interstate Regatta within the Australian Rowing Championships.

In 2017 Volker combined with Sarah Hawe to win the inaugural Sarah Tait Memorial Trophy for the national women's pair championship.

== International representative rowing ==
Volker made her Australian representative debut in the 2015 representative season. She rowed in the senior women's eight at two World Rowing Cups in Europe and also competed in a coxless four at the WRC II. Then Volker rowed in the five seat of the eight at the 2015 World Rowing Championships in Aiguebelette. They finished in overall seventh place.

Volker was a member of the Australian women's eight who initially missed qualification for the 2016 Rio Olympics but received a late call up following the Russian drug scandal. WADA had discovered Russian state sponsored drug testing violations and the IOC acted to protect clean athletes and set strict entry guidelines for Russian athletes resulting in most of their rowers and nearly all of their crews being withdrawn from the Olympic regatta. The crew had dispersed two months earlier after their failure to qualify but reconvened, travelled at the last minute to Rio and borrowed a shell. They finished last in their heat, last in the repechage and were eliminated.
