= Amanda Elmore =

American rower

Personal information
- Born: March 13, 1991 (age 35) West Lafayette, Indiana, United States
Medal record
Women's rowing
Representing the United States
Olympic Games
Gold medal – first place	2016 Rio de Janeiro	W8+
World Championships
Gold medal – first place	2015 Aiguebelette	W4x

Amanda Elmore (born March 13, 1991) is an American rower. She won the gold medal in the quad sculls at the 2015 World Rowing Championships and won the gold medal at the 2016 Summer Olympics in the Woman's eight. Elmore graduated from Harrison High School in West Lafayette, Indiana in 2009, and earned a biology degree from Purdue University in 2013. She completed a M.Sc. (2014) at the University of Michigan.

She is the granddaughter of William Cronk Elmore.
