= Sporting Giants =

Sporting Giants was a scheme launched by Sir Steve Redgrave on behalf of UK Sport in February 2007 to identify young people with the potential to display talent in sports such as handball, rowing and volleyball. Because tallness is considered a possible advantage in those sports a minimum height of 6’ 3” (190 cm) for men and 5’11 (180 cm) for women was specified. An age requirement of 16 to 25 was set and an athletic background was also sought. 4,800 applications were received for the scheme, 3,854 of which met the eligibility criteria.

== 2012 Summer Olympics ==
Ten participants in the scheme were members of Team GB at the 2012 Summer Olympics and one of them was a medal winner: Helen Glover won gold in the women's coxless pairs rowing. She was a cross country runner, swimmer, hockey and tennis player but had no rowing experience prior joining the scheme in 2008. At 178 cm tall Glover did not meet the minimum height standard specified for the scheme but she stood on tiptoes when she was being measured at the selection event. Victoria Thornley finished fifth as a member of the women's eight rowing crew. Four male and two female participants in the scheme were members of the first handball teams ever fielded by the UK at an Olympic Games. The men's team included Bobby White, the team captain, who was a semi professional footballer before he applied. The teams lost all the matches in their groups, the men's team being defeated 44-15 in their opening match against France.
