= Adelina Boguș =

Romanian rower (born 1988)

Personal information
- Full name: Adelina Maria Boguș
- Born: Adelina Maria Cojocariu; 4 September 1988 (age 38) Botoşani, Romania

Sport
- Sport: Rowing
Medal record
Women's rowing
Representing Romania
Olympic Games
Bronze medal – third place	2016 Rio de Janeiro	Eight
World Championships
Gold medal – first place	2017 Sarasota	Eight
Silver medal – second place	2009 Poznań	Eight
Bronze medal – third place	2010 Karapiro	Eight
European Championships
Gold medal – first place	2009 Brest	Eight
Gold medal – first place	2010 Montemor-o-Velho	Eight
Gold medal – first place	2011 Plovdiv	Eight
Gold medal – first place	2013 Sevilla	Eight
Gold medal – first place	2014 Belgrade	Eight
Gold medal – first place	2017 Racice	Eight
Bronze medal – third place	2007 Poznań	Coxless pair
Bronze medal – third place	2008 Athens	Quadruple sculls
Bronze medal – third place	2012 Varese	Double sculls
Bronze medal – third place	2015 Poznan	Eight

Adelina Maria Boguș (née Cojocariu; born 4 September 1988) is a Romanian rower. She competed in the women's eight event at the 2012 and 2016 Summer Olympics, winning a bronze medal.

She won gold in the women's eight at the 2009, 2010, 2014 and 2017 European Championships, silver at the 2009 World Championships and bronze at the 2010 World Championships and 2015 European Championships. In the women's double sculls, she won the bronze medal at the 2012 European Championships with Maria Diana Bursuc In the women's quadruple sculls, she won bronze at the 2008 European Championships with Ionelia Zaharia, Cristina Ilie and Roxana Cogianu. In the women's pair, she won a bronze at the 2007 European Championships with Nicoleta Albu.
