= Lies Rustenburg =

Dutch rower (born 1990)

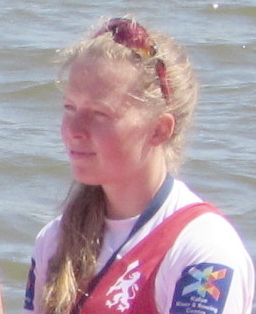
- Rustenburg at the 2016 European Championships

Personal information
- Born: 8 April 1990 (age 36)
- Height: 183 cm (6 ft 0 in)
- Weight: 74 kg (163 lb)

Sport
- Sport: Rowing
- Event: Eights
- Club: AASR Skoll
- Coached by: Josy Verdonkschot

Achievements and titles
- Olympic finals: 2016
Medal record
Women's rowing
Representing the Netherlands
European Championships
Silver medal – second place	2015 Poznań	Eights
Silver medal – second place	2016 Brandenburg	Eights
Silver medal – second place	2017 Račice	Eights
Bronze medal – third place	2018 Glasgow	Eights

Lies Rustenburg (born 8 April 1990) is a Dutch rower who competes in the eights.

== Career ==
She won silver medals at the 2015 and 2016 European Championships and placed sixth at the 2016 Rio Olympics.

== Personal life ==
Rustenburg's younger brother, Wibout Rustenburg, is also a rower.
