= Francie Turner =

New Zealand rowing cox

Personal information
- Born: 6 April 1992 (age 34) Christchurch, New Zealand
- Education: Rangi Ruru Girls' School; Massey University
- Height: 159 cm (5 ft 3 in)
- Weight: 50 kg (110 lb)

Sport
- Country: New Zealand
- Club: Canterbury Rowing Club
Medal record
Women's rowing
Representing New Zealand
World Championships
| Silver medal – second place | 2015 Aiguebelette | W8+ |
World U23 Championships
| Silver medal – second place | 2010 Brest | W8+ |
| Silver medal – second place | 2011 Amsterdam | W8+ |
World Junior Championships
| Silver medal – second place | 2009 Brive-la-Gaillarde | W8+ |

Frances Turner (born 6 April 1992) is a New Zealand coxswain. She competed at the Rio Olympics with the New Zealand women's eight.

== Private life ==
Turner was born in Christchurch in 1992 and grew up on a dairy farm near Southbridge in Canterbury. She received her secondary education at Rangi Ruru Girls' School in Christchurch. She was then an extramural student at Massey University, from where she graduated with a Bachelor of Business Studies in 2013. She now lives in Hamilton and is trained by Dave Thompson, with Lake Karapiro as the training venue.

== Rowing career ==
Turner took up rowing while she was at Rangi Ruru. Her first international event was the 2009 World Rowing Junior Championships in Brive-la-Gaillarde, France, where she won a silver medal with the eight; Eve MacFarlane and Zoe Stevenson were also in the boat. In 2010 and 2011, she competed with the eight in the World Rowing U23 Championships in Brest, Belarus and Amsterdam, Netherlands, respectively. In both races, the team won the silver medal, beaten by the US in 2010 and Canada in 2011.

In 2010, she coxed the New Zealand eight of the elite rowers at the World Rowing Championships held at Lake Karapiro in New Zealand; the team came eights.

Turner took a break from international rowing after the 2011 U23 championships. She started competing again in 2015 and won a silver medal at the World Rowing Championships with the women's eight, qualifying the boat for the 2016 Olympics. For the last few weeks prior to the Rio Olympics, the women's eight trained at Lake Bohinj in Slovenia. With the women's eight, she came fourth at the 2016 Rio Olympics.
