= Swimming at the 2016 Summer Olympics – Women's 100 metre freestyle =

Women's 100 metre freestyle at the Games of the XXXI Olympiad
- Venue: Olympic Aquatics Stadium
- Dates: 10 August 2016 (heats & semifinals); 11 August 2016 (final)
- Competitors: 48 from 37 nations
- Winning time: 52.70 OR

Medalists
1st place, gold medalist(s)		Penny Oleksiak	Canada
1st place, gold medalist(s)		Simone Manuel	United States
3rd place, bronze medalist(s)		Sarah Sjöström	Sweden

The women's 100 metre freestyle event at the 2016 Summer Olympics took place on 10 and 11 August at the Olympic Aquatics Stadium.

== Summary ==
In one of the most unexpected results at these Games, Canadian teenager Penny Oleksiak and U.S. sprinter Simone Manuel pulled off an enormous upset from Australia's pre-race favorites Bronte and Cate Campbell down the home stretch to be in a dead heat for the gold medal. About midway of the final lap, both Oleksiak and Manuel came from behind to overhaul almost the entire field, before touching the wall simultaneously for an Olympic record in 52.70. Building a new milestone, Manuel became the first ever African-American female to earn an Olympic gold in swimming, while Oleksiak picked up her fourth medal to establish herself as Canada's most successful athlete at a single edition in Summer Olympic history. In later years, she set the record for the most career medals won by a Canadian summer Olympian.

Sweden's Sarah Sjöström captured the bronze with a 52.99 to complete a full set of medals at the Games, edging out Bronte Campbell (53.04) to fourth by a 0.05-second deficit. Dutch sprinter Ranomi Kromowidjojo missed her chance to defend the title with a fifth-place time in 53.08, while world-record holder Cate Campbell, who broke the existing Olympic record in the heats and then again in the semifinals, slipped to sixth in 53.24. Manuel's teammate Abbey Weitzeil (53.30) and Denmark's four-time Olympian Jeanette Ottesen (53.36) rounded out the top eight.

Notable swimmers missed the final roster, including Brazil's home-crowd favorite Etiene Medeiros, Belarus' two-time Olympic medalist Aliaksandra Herasimenia, and Italy's Federica Pellegrini, who scratched the afternoon prelims earlier to focus on her 4 × 200 m freestyle relay duty instead.

In the victory ceremony, the medals for the competition were presented by James Tomkins, Australia, member of the International Olympic Committee, and the gifts were presented by Matthew Dunn, Australia, Bureau Member of FINA.

== Records ==
Prior to this competition, the existing world and Olympic records were as follows.

World record	Cate Campbell (AUS)	52.06	Brisbane, Australia	2 July 2016
Olympic record	Ranomi Kromowidjojo (NED)	53.00	London, Great Britain	2 August 2012

The following records were established during the competition:

Date	Event	Name	Nationality	Time	Record
August 10	Heat 5	Cate Campbell	Australia	52.78	OR
August 10	Semifinal 2	Cate Campbell	Australia	52.71	OR
August 11	Final	Simone Manuel; Penny Oleksiak	United States; Canada	52.70	OR

== Competition format ==
The competition consisted of three rounds: heats, semifinals, and a final. The swimmers with the best 16 times in the heats advanced to the semifinals. The swimmers with the best 8 times in the semifinals advanced to the final. Swim-offs were used as necessary to break ties for advancement to the next round.

== Results ==
=== Heats ===
Rank	Heat	Lane	Name	Nationality	Time	Notes
1	5	4	Cate Campbell	Australia	52.78	Q, OR
2	4	3	Simone Manuel	United States	53.32	Q
3	6	5	Sarah Sjöström	Sweden	53.37	Q
4	5	5	Ranomi Kromowidjojo	Netherlands	53.43	Q
5	5	3	Penny Oleksiak	Canada	53.53	Q
5	5	6	Jeanette Ottesen	Denmark	53.53	Q
7	6	3	Abbey Weitzeil	United States	53.54	Q
8	6	4	Bronte Campbell	Australia	53.71	Q
9	5	2	Chantal Van Landeghem	Canada	53.89	Q
10	6	2	Charlotte Bonnet	France	53.93	Q
11	5	8	Pernille Blume	Denmark	54.15	Q
11	6	7	Zhu Menghui	China	54.15	Q
13	4	6	Aliaksandra Herasimenia	Belarus	54.25	Q
14	4	8	Etiene Medeiros	Brazil	54.38	Q
15	4	2	Shen Duo	China	54.41	Q, WD
16	6	1	Rikako Ikee	Japan	54.50	Q
16	6	8	Miki Uchida	Japan	54.50	Q
18	5	7	Arianna Vanderpool-Wallace	Bahamas	54.56	
19	3	5	Veronika Popova	Russia	54.60	
20	4	4	Femke Heemskerk	Netherlands	54.63	
21	5	1	Larissa Oliveira	Brazil	54.72	
22	4	7	Béryl Gastaldello	France	54.80	
23	3	1	Maria Ugolkova	Switzerland	54.85	
24	3	7	Camille Cheng	Hong Kong	54.92	
25	3	8	Julie Meynen	Luxembourg	55.09	
26	3	4	Erika Ferraioli	Italy	55.20	
27	2	4	Susann Bjørnsen	Norway	55.35	
28	4	1	Nataliya Lovtsova	Russia	55.37	
29	3	3	Katarzyna Wilk	Poland	55.44	
30	3	6	Andrea Murez	Israel	55.47	
31	3	2	Nina Rangelova	Bulgaria	55.71	
32	2	3	Natthanan Junkrajang	Thailand	56.24	
33	2	5	Jasmine Alkhaldi	Philippines	56.30	
34	1	5	Inés Remersaro	Uruguay	57.85	NR
35	2	8	Jade Ashleigh Howard	Zambia	58.47	
36	2	6	Ana-Iulia Dascăl	Romania	58.72	
37	2	1	Heather Arseth	Mauritius	58.89	
38	2	7	Tracy Keith-Matchitt	Cook Islands	58.90	
39	2	2	Karen Riveros	Paraguay	59.00	
40	1	3	Ana Sofia Nóbrega	Angola	59.23	
41	1	6	Fatima Alkaramova	Azerbaijan	59.41	
42	1	4	Jovana Terzić	Montenegro	59.59	
43	1	2	Nikol Merizaj	Albania	59.99	
44	1	8	Estellah Fils Rabetsara	Madagascar	1:01.11	
45	1	7	Yusra Mardini	Refugee Olympic Team	1:04.66	
46	1	1	Aminath Shajan	Maldives	1:05.71	
	4	5	Federica Pellegrini	Italy	DNS	
	6	6	Michelle Coleman	Sweden	DNS	

=== Semifinals ===
==== Semifinal 1 ====
Rank	Lane	Name	Nationality	Time	Notes
1	4	Simone Manuel	United States	53.11	Q
2	6	Bronte Campbell	Australia	53.29	Q
3	3	Jeanette Ottesen	Denmark	53.35	Q, NR
4	5	Ranomi Kromowidjojo	Netherlands	53.42	Q
5	7	Zhu Menghui	China	53.98	
6	8	Miki Uchida	Japan	54.39	
7	2	Charlotte Bonnet	France	54.54	
8	1	Etiene Medeiros	Brazil	54.59	

==== Semifinal 2 ====
Rank	Lane	Name	Nationality	Time	Notes
1	4	Cate Campbell	Australia	52.71	Q, OR
2	3	Penny Oleksiak	Canada	52.72	Q, WJ, AM
3	5	Sarah Sjöström	Sweden	53.16	Q
4	6	Abbey Weitzeil	United States	53.53	Q
5	2	Chantal Van Landeghem	Canada	54.00	
6	7	Pernille Blume	Denmark	54.19	
7	8	Rikako Ikee	Japan	54.31	
8	1	Aliaksandra Herasimenia	Belarus	54.34	

=== Final ===
Rank	Lane	Name	Nationality	Time	Notes
1st place, gold medalist(s)	5	Penny Oleksiak	Canada	52.70	OR, WJ, AM
1st place, gold medalist(s)	3	Simone Manuel	United States	52.70	OR, AM
3rd place, bronze medalist(s)	6	Sarah Sjöström	Sweden	52.99	
4	2	Bronte Campbell	Australia	53.04	
5	1	Ranomi Kromowidjojo	Netherlands	53.08	
6	4	Cate Campbell	Australia	53.24	
7	8	Abbey Weitzeil	United States	53.30	
8	7	Jeanette Ottesen	Denmark	53.36	
