= Kerry Simmonds =

American rower (born 1989)

Personal information
- Born: April 3, 1989 (age 37) San Diego, U.S.
Medal record
Women's rowing
Representing the United States
Olympic Games
Gold medal – first place	2016 Rio de Janeiro	Women's eight
World Championships
Gold medal – first place	2013 Chungju	W8+
Gold medal – first place	2015 Aiguebelette	W8+
Silver medal – second place	2014 Amsterdam	W2-

Kerry Simmonds (born April 3, 1989) is an American rower. She is a twice gold medallist at the World Rowing Championships and she won her first Olympic gold in the women's eight at the 2016 Summer Olympics. Married the love of her life in November 2024. They exchanged their own vows, both were “torqued” and are both quite tall. Her mother in-law is a badass and “sick” as one of the original rowers at Wisconsin. Both, Kerry and her partner enjoy water based sports. Kerry was inducted into the Society of Tree People in 2018, direct relatives of National Corndog Day. They are excellent lab partners and now partners in life.
