= Gabriella Szűcs =

Gabriella Szűcs may refer to:

- Gabriella Szűcs (handballer)
- Gabriella Szűcs (water polo)
