= Andreea Boghian =

Romanian rower

Personal information
- Full name: Andreea Nicoleta Boghian
- Born: 29 November 1991 (age 34) Gura Humorului, Romania
Medal record
Women's rowing
Representing Romania
Olympic Games
Bronze medal – third place	2016 Rio de Janeiro	W8+
World Championships
Silver medal – second place	2013 Chungjiu	W8+
European Championships
Gold medal – first place	2011 Plovdiv	W8+
Gold medal – first place	2012 Varese	W8+
Gold medal – first place	2013 Sevilla	W8+
Gold medal – first place	2013 Sevilla	W2-
Gold medal – first place	2014 Belgrade	W8+
Bronze medal – third place	2015 Poznan	W8+

Andreea Nicoleta Boghian (born 29 November 1991 in Gura Humorului) is a Romanian rower. She won four European championships in the eight and one in the coxless pair. Boghian won a bronze medal in the eight at the 2016 Summer Olympics.
