= Mihaela Petrilă =

Romanian rower

Personal information
- Born: 7 May 1991 (age 35) Paşcani, Iași, Romania
- Height: 190 cm (6 ft 3 in)
- Weight: 74 kg (163 lb)

Sport
- Sport: Rowing
Medal record
Women's rowing
Representing Romania
Olympic Games
Bronze medal – third place	2016 Rio de Janeiro	Eight
World Championships
Gold medal – first place	2017 Sarasota	Eight
European Championships
Gold medal – first place	2014 Belgrade	Eight
Gold medal – first place	2017 Račice	Eight
Bronze medal – third place	2015 Poznań	Eight

Mihaela Petrilă (born 7 May 1991) is a Romanian rower. She competed in the women's eight event at the 2016 Summer Olympics.
