= Lauren Schmetterling =

American rower

Personal information
- Born: August 3, 1988 (age 37) Voorhees Township, New Jersey, U.S.
Medal record
Women's rowing
Representing the United States
Olympic Games
Gold medal – first place	2016 Rio de Janeiro	W8+
World Championships
Gold medal – first place	2013 Chungju	W8+
Gold medal – first place	2014 Amsterdam	W8+
Gold medal – first place	2015 Aiguebelette	W8+

Lauren Schmetterling (born August 3, 1988) is an American rower who won a total of four gold medals in the Women's eight competition at the 2013 World Rowing Championships, the 2014 World Rowing Championships, the 2015 World Rowing Championships and the 2016 Summer Olympics in Rio de Janeiro. In 2021, she began coaching for the Michigan Wolverines rowing team.

Born in Voorhees Township, New Jersey, Schmetterling grew up in Moorestown, New Jersey and graduated from Moorestown High School as part of the class of 2006. She graduated in 2010 from Colgate University with a degree in economics.
