= Ana-Iulia Dascăl =

Romanian swimmer

Personal information
- Nationality: Romanian
- Born: 12 September 2002 (age 23) Cluj-Napoca, Romania

Sport
- Sport: Swimming

Ana-Iulia Dascăl (born 12 September 2002) is a Romanian swimmer. She competed in the women's 100 metre freestyle event at the 2016 Summer Olympics.
