= Ae-Ri Noort =

Dutch rower (born 1983)

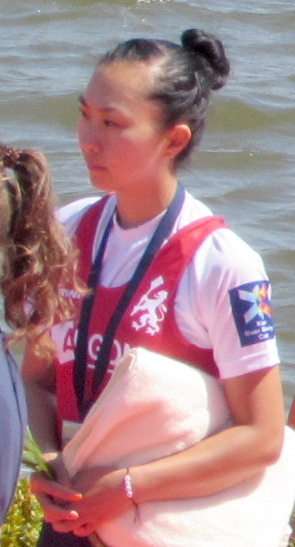
- Noort at the 2016 European Championships

Personal information
- Nationality: Dutch
- Born: 10 January 1983 (age 43) Seoul, South Korea
- Height: 160 cm (5 ft 3 in)
- Weight: 49 kg (108 lb)

Sport
- Sport: Rowing
- Event: Eights
- Club: RSVU Okeanos
- Coached by: Josy Verdonkschot
Medal record
Women's rowing
Representing the Netherlands
European Championships
| Silver medal – second place | 2015 Poznań | Eights |
| Silver medal – second place | 2016 Brandenburg | Eights |

Ae-Ri Noort (born 10 January 1983) is a Dutch rowing coxswain who competes in eights. She won silver medals at the 2015 and 2016 European Championships, placing fourth in 2014, and participated in the 2016 Rio Olympics. Noort has a degree in biomedical science from Vrije Universiteit Amsterdam.
