= Cornish ice cream =

Ice cream made with Cornish clotted cream

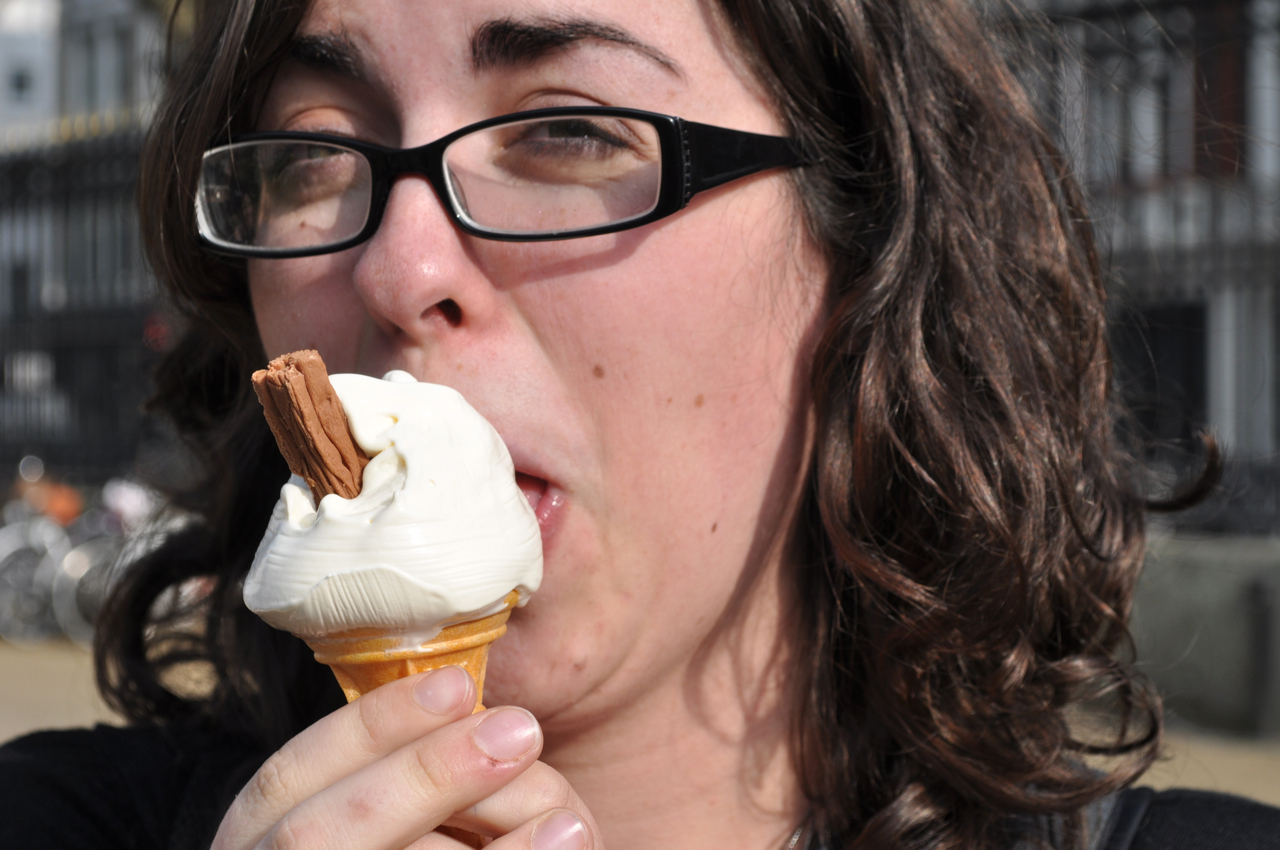
Consumption of Cornish ice cream

Cornish ice cream (Cornish: dehen rew Kernewek) is a form of ice cream first made in Cornwall, England. It is made with Cornish clotted cream, and may be made with sorbet. Today, it is still produced using milk from many farms in Cornwall, although Cornish ice cream (and brands of Cornish ice cream) are sold in supermarkets all over the United Kingdom. It may be made with regular ice cream and vanilla essence. Some companies of Cornwall, such as a company in East Looe, claim to make Cornish ice cream using only Cornish milk and cream.

== See also ==
- Kelly's of Cornwall
