= Amanda Polk =

American rower (born 1986)

Personal information
- Born: August 2, 1986 (age 39) Pittsburgh, Pennsylvania, U.S.
- Education: Oakland Catholic High School, University of Notre Dame
- Height: 5 ft 11 in (1.80 m)

Sport
- Country: United States
- Sport: Rowing
- Event: Women's eight
- College team: Notre Dame Fighting Irish
Medal record
Women's rowing
Representing the United States
Olympic Games
Gold medal – first place	2016 Rio de Janeiro	W8+
World Championships
Gold medal – first place	2010 Karapiro	W8+
Gold medal – first place	2011 Lake Bled	W8+
Gold medal – first place	2013 Chungju	W8+
Gold medal – first place	2014 Amsterdam	W8+
Gold medal – first place	2015 Aiguebelette	W8+
Silver medal – second place	2009 Poznań	W4-

Amanda Polk (born August 2, 1986) is an American rower. She won Olympic gold in the Women's eight rowing competition in the 2016 Summer Olympics.
