= Ioana Strungaru =

Romanian rower (born 1989)

Personal information
- Born: Ioana Crăciun; 4 January 1989 (age 37) Trușești, Romania

Sport
- Sport: Rowing
Medal record
Women's rowing
Representing Romania
Olympic Games
Bronze medal – third place	2016 Rio de Janeiro	W8+
World Championships
Silver medal – second place	2009 Poznań	W8+
Silver medal – second place	2013 Chungju	W8+
Bronze medal – third place	2010 Karapiro	W8+
European Championships
Gold medal – first place	2014 Belgrade	W8+

Ioana Strungaru (née Crăciun, by which name she was known prior to 2016; born 4 January 1989) is a Romanian rower. She competed in the women's eight event at the 2016 Summer Olympics.
