= Iuliana Popa =

Romanian rower

Personal information
- Nationality: Romanian
- Born: 5 July 1996 (age 29) Comănești, Bacău, Romania
- Height: 185 cm (6 ft 1 in)
- Weight: 72 kg (159 lb)

Sport
- Sport: Rowing
Medal record
Women's rowing
Representing Romania
Olympic Games
Bronze medal – third place	2016 Rio de Janeiro	Eight
World Championships
Gold medal – first place	2017 Sarasota	Eight
European Championships
Gold medal – first place	2017 Račice	Eight
Gold medal – first place	2018 Glasgow	Eight
Gold medal – first place	2019 Lucerne	Eight

Iuliana Popa (born 5 July 1996) is a Romanian rower. She competed in the women's eight event at the 2016 Summer Olympics.
