= Daniela Druncea =

Romanian rower and gymnast

- Born: 2 November 1990 (age 35) Buftea, Romania
- Height: 150 cm (4 ft 11 in)

Gymnastics career
- Discipline: Women's artistic gymnastics
- Club: CSS Steaua Bucharest
- Head coach: Nicolae Forminte (gymnastics)
Medal record
Women's rowing
Representing Romania
Olympic Games
Bronze medal – third place	2016 Rio de Janeiro	Eight
World Championships
Gold medal – first place	2017 Sarasota	Eight
Silver medal – second place	2013 Chungju	Eight
European Championships
Gold medal – first place	2013 Seville	Eight
Gold medal – first place	2014 Belgrade	Eight
Gold medal – first place	2017 Račice	Eight
Gold medal – first place	2018 Glasgow	Eight
Gold medal – first place	2019 Lucerne	Eight
Gold medal – first place	2020 Poznań	Eight
Gold medal – first place	2021 Varese	Eight
Bronze medal – third place	2015 Poznań	Eight
Women's artistic gymnastics
World Championships
Bronze medal – third place	2007 Stuttgart	Team

Daniela Druncea (born 2 November 1990) is a Romanian rowing coxswain and retired artistic gymnast. As a gymnast, she is a world bronze medalist with the team and was an alternate to the 2008 Romanian Olympic team. As a rower, she won a bronze medal at the 2016 Summer Olympics.

Druncea retired from gymnastics in 2009. She became a coxswain and won medals at the European championships, world championships and Olympic Games.
