= Laura Oprea =

Romanian rower (born 1994)

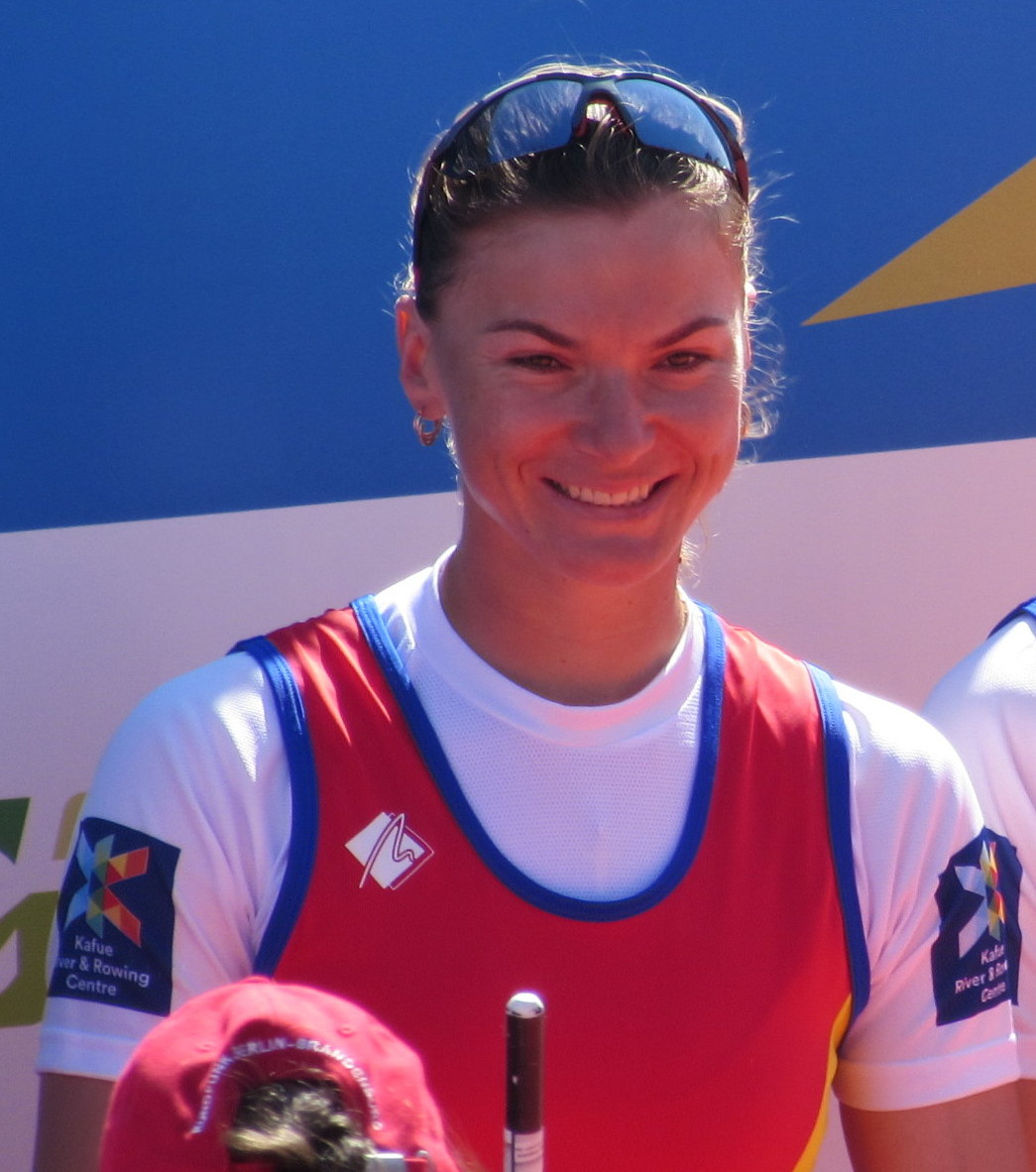
- Oprea in 2016

Personal information
- Nationality: Romanian
- Born: 19 February 1994 (age 32) Nisiporeşti, Neamț, Romania
- Height: 186 cm (6 ft 1 in)
- Weight: 75 kg (165 lb)

Sport
- Sport: Rowing
Medal record
Women's rowing
Representing Romania
Olympic Games
Bronze medal – third place	2016 Rio de Janeiro	Eight
World Championships
Gold medal – first place	2017 Sarasota	Eight
European Championships
Gold medal – first place	2017 Račice	Coxless pair
Gold medal – first place	2017 Račice	Eight
Silver medal – second place	2014 Belgrade	Coxless pair
Bronze medal – third place	2015 Poznań	Coxless pair
Bronze medal – third place	2016 Brandenburg	Coxless pair

Laura Oprea (born 19 February 1994) is a Romanian rower. She competed in the women's eight event at the 2016 Summer Olympics.
