= Minerva Bath Rowing Club =

British rowing club

- Location: Newbridge, Bath, England
- Home water: River Avon
- Founded: 1914
- Affiliations: British Rowing boat code – MIN; Alkmaar Rowing Club
- Website: www.minervabathrc.org.uk

Minerva Bath Rowing Club is a rowing club in Bath, England. Minerva is Sport England Clubmark accredited. The club is based in Newbridge, Bath with its home water on the River Avon. The club shares its facilities with the University of Bath Boat Club and the British Rowing START Program.

== The club ==
Minerva is Sport England Clubmark accredited which means it has demonstrated awareness of child protection and safety, along with providing quality coaching, equal opportunities and good management. The club is also a participant in the Mentoring Plus, a youth crime prevention project working with vulnerable young people, living in Bath and North East Somerset.

== History ==
The club was founded in 1914 as Bath Ladies Boating Club (BLBC), although there is reference to a club existing before the turn of the 20th century. It is one of the earliest women's rowing clubs in England and had strong links with the suffragette movement in the city. This association is still represented with the club's colours of violet and gold. The club rowed out of the Bath Boating Station (later known as Maynard's boatyard) during some of its formative years.

Klaus Riekemann competed at 1960 Summer Olympics in Rome and Arnold Cooke competed at 1964 Summer Olympics in Tokyo. Both competed in the World Masters in 2012.

In 1992, Bath Ladies Boat Club merged with City of Bath Rowing Club to bring the club into its present form.

The club moved to its present site in 2005, putting in place a boathouse built entirely by its membership. A second boathouse was built in 2010 and named after Arnold Cooke.

Minerva Bath Rowing gained a great deal of positive publicity during the London 2012 Summer Olympics when Helen Glover; a product of the British Rowing START program who learnt to row at Minerva won a gold medal with Heather Stanning in the Women's Coxless Pairs at Eton Dorney.

In 2016, another rowers from the START program Vicky Thornley won a silver medal at the 2016 Summer Olympics.

== Notable members ==
- Arnold Cooke
- Helen Glover
- Klaus Riekemann

== Honours ==
=== National champions ===
| Year | Winning crew/s |
|---|---|
| 2009 | Women 4x |
| 2014 | Women 4x, Women 4- |

=== Henley Royal Regatta ===
| Year | Races won |
|---|---|
| 2013 | Princess Grace Challenge Cup |
