= Roxana Cogianu =

Romanian rower (born 1986)

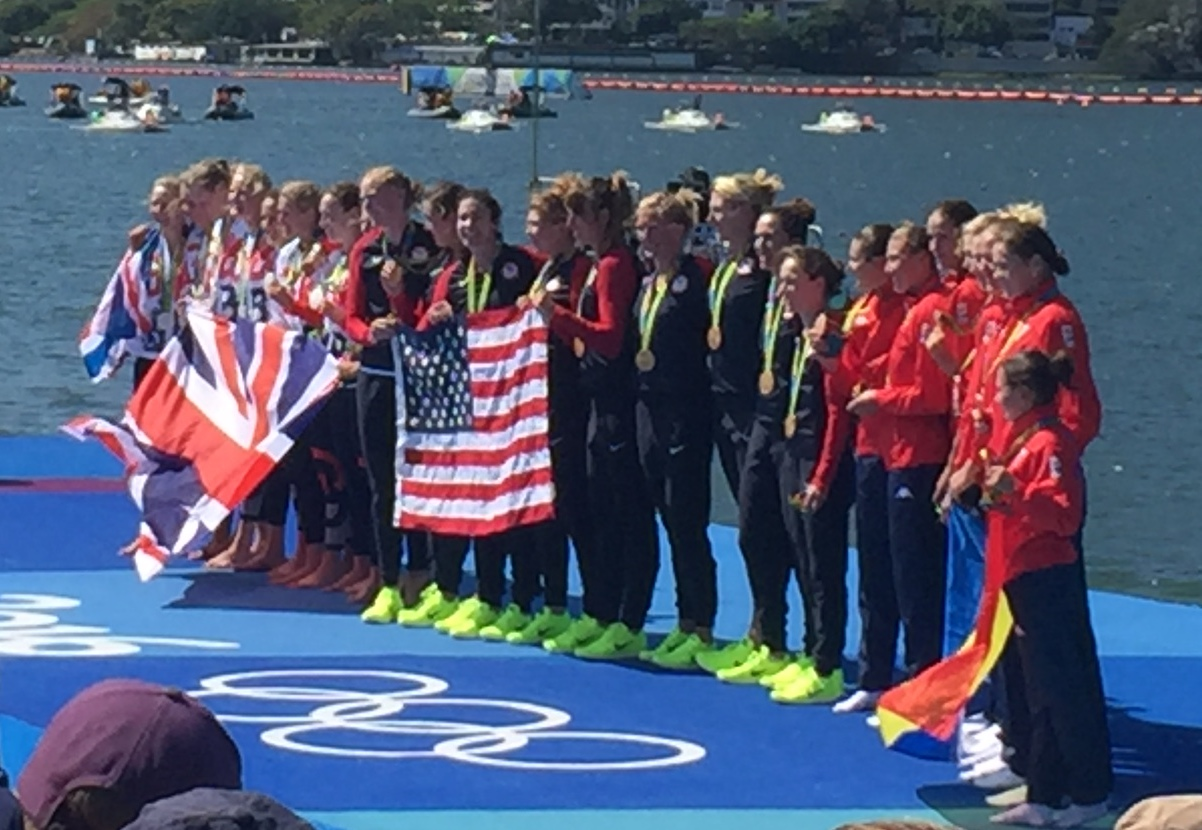
- Rio 2016 Summer Olympics

Personal information
- Full name: Roxana Gabriela Cogianu
- Born: 21 September 1986 (age 39) Iași, Romania
Medal record
Women's rowing
Representing Romania
Olympic Games
Bronze medal – third place	2016 Rio de Janeiro	Eight
World Championships
Silver medal – second place	2009 Poznań	Eight
Silver medal – second place	2013 Chungjiu	Coxless pair
Silver medal – second place	2013 Chungju	Eight
Bronze medal – third place	2010 Karapiro	Eight
European Championships
Gold medal – first place	2014 Belgrade	Eight
Silver medal – second place	2007 Poznań	Quad scull

Roxana Gabriela Cogianu (born 21 September 1986 in Iași) is a Romanian rower. Competing in the women's eight she finished 4th in the eight at the 2012 Summer Olympics, having finished in 9th in the women's double sculls at the 2008 Summer Olympics.
