= New Zealand at the 2016 Summer Olympics =

- IOC code: NZL
- NOC: New Zealand Olympic Committee
- Website: www.olympic.org.nz

in Rio de Janeiro
- Competitors: 199 in 20 sports
- Flag bearer (opening): Peter Burling
- Flag bearer (closing): Lisa Carrington
- Medals Ranked 19th: Gold 4 Silver 9 Bronze 5 Total 18

Summer Olympics appearances (overview)
- 1908; 1912; 1920; 1924; 1928; 1932; 1936; 1948; 1952; 1956; 1960; 1964; 1968; 1972; 1976; 1980; 1984; 1988; 1992; 1996; 2000; 2004; 2008; 2012; 2016; 2020; 2024; 2028

Other related appearances
- Australasia (1908–1912)

New Zealand competed at the 2016 Summer Olympics in Rio de Janeiro, Brazil, from 5 to 21 August 2016. This was the nation's twenty-third appearance as an independent nation at the Summer Olympics, having made its debut at the 1920 Games and competed at every Games since. The New Zealand team consisted of 199 athletes, 100 women and 99 men, across twenty sports, the first time New Zealand was represented by more women than men at the Summer Olympics.

The New Zealand team collected a total of 18 medals, four gold, nine silver and five bronze, at these Games, surpassing a record of 13 gained at both the 1988 and 2012 Summer Olympics; it also exceeded High Performance Sport New Zealand's (HPSNZ) target of 14 medals for the Games. Athletics (track and field) and sailing led the sports with four medals each, with three medals in each of canoeing and rowing, and one medal in each of cycling, golf, rugby sevens and shooting. Rowers Mahé Drysdale, Hamish Bond and Eric Murray, and sprint canoeist Lisa Carrington successfully defended their Olympic titles, while sailors Peter Burling and Blair Tuke ran away in the 49er class standings and secured their gold-medal victory before the final two races. New Zealand women won the majority of the medals (11), the second time this has happened in the nation's Olympic history (the first was in 1952).

== Medal tables ==
Unless otherwise stated, all dates and times are in Brasília time (UTC−3), fifteen hours behind New Zealand Standard Time (UTC+12).

Medal	Name	Sport	Event	Date
Gold	Hamish Bond; Eric Murray	Rowing	Men's coxless pair	11 August
Gold	Mahé Drysdale	Rowing	Men's single sculls	13 August
Gold	Lisa Carrington	Canoeing	Women's K-1 200 m	16 August
Gold	Peter Burling; Blair Tuke	Sailing	Men's 49er	18 August
Silver	Natalie Rooney	Shooting	Women's trap	7 August
Silver	New Zealand women's rugby sevens team: Shakira Baker; Kelly Brazier; Gayle Broughton; Theresa Fitzpatrick; Sarah Goss; Huriana Manuel; Kayla McAlister; Tyla Nathan-Wong; Terina Te Tamaki; Ruby Tui; Niall Williams; Portia Woodman	Rugby sevens	Women's tournament	8 August
Silver	Luuka Jones	Canoeing	Women's slalom K-1	11 August
Silver	Eddie Dawkins; Ethan Mitchell; Sam Webster	Cycling	Men's team sprint	11 August
Silver	Valerie Adams	Athletics	Women's shot put	12 August
Silver	Genevieve Behrent; Rebecca Scown	Rowing	Women's coxless pair	12 August
Silver	Jo Aleh; Polly Powrie	Sailing	Women's 470	18 August
Silver	Alex Maloney; Molly Meech	Sailing	Women's 49er FX	18 August
Silver	Lydia Ko	Golf	Women's individual	20 August
Bronze	Sam Meech	Sailing	Laser	16 August
Bronze	Lisa Carrington	Canoeing	Women's K-1 500 m	18 August
Bronze	Tom Walsh	Athletics	Men's shot put	18 August
Bronze	Eliza McCartney	Athletics	Women's pole vault	19 August
Bronze	Nick Willis	Athletics	Men's 1500 metres	20 August

Golfer Lydia Ko (b. 24 April 1997), pole vaulter Eliza McCartney (b. 11 December 1996) and rugby sevens player Terina Te Tamaki (b. 1 May 1997) became the first teenaged women to win an Olympic medal for New Zealand, beating the previous record set by 21-year old Jean Stewart at the 1952 Summer Olympics.

In addition, Nikki Hamblin was awarded a Fair Play award by the International Fair Play Committee for her actions in her 5,000m heat.

Medals by sport
Sport	Gold medal	Silver medal	Bronze medal	Total
Rowing	2	1	0	3
Sailing	1	2	1	4
Canoeing	1	1	1	3
Athletics	0	1	3	4
Cycling	0	1	0	1
Golf	0	1	0	1
Rugby sevens	0	1	0	1
Shooting	0	1	0	1
Total	4	9	5	18

Medals by date
Date	Gold medal	Silver medal	Bronze medal	Total
6 August	0	0	0	0
7 August	0	1	0	1
8 August	0	1	0	1
9 August	0	0	0	0
10 August	0	0	0	0
11 August	1	2	0	3
12 August	0	2	0	2
13 August	1	0	0	1
14 August	0	0	0	0
15 August	0	0	0	0
16 August	1	0	1	2
17 August	0	0	0	0
18 August	1	2	2	5
19 August	0	0	1	1
20 August	0	1	1	2
21 August	0	0	0	0
Total	4	9	5	18

Medals by gender
Gender	Gold medal	Silver medal	Bronze medal	Total
Male	3	1	3	7
Female	1	8	2	11
Total	4	9	5	18

== Delegation ==
The New Zealand Olympic Committee (NZOC) confirmed a team of 199 athletes, 99 men and 100 women, to compete in twenty sports. It is the largest delegation New Zealand has sent to the Olympics, surpassing the 184 athletes who were sent to the 2012 Summer Olympics in London. The nation participated in four more sports than 2012: while not qualifying any competitors in boxing, New Zealand qualified competitors in golf and rugby sevens (both new to the 2016 Games), diving, gymnastics and wrestling. Also missing from the 2016 team is the men's football squad, having been disqualified after fielding an ineligible player in the Olympic qualifying tournament. Rowing had the largest delegation with 36 competitors; diving, judo, taekwondo and wrestling had the smallest delegations with only one competitor each.

For individual sports, the NZOC's overarching selection policy meant it would only consider selecting athletes that were proven capable of making the top 16. For team sports, the NZOC would only consider selecting teams proven capable of advancing beyond the first round.

Seventeen-year-old gymnast Courtney McGregor is New Zealand's youngest competitor, while 62-year-old equestrian dressage rider Julie Brougham is the oldest competitor. Forty-one competitors (20.5 percent) are of Māori descent, including 17 of the 24 rugby sevens players.

A number of past Olympic medallists returned, including defending champions: Valerie Adams (women's shot put), sailors Jo Aleh and Polly Powrie (women's 470 class), flatwater canoeist Lisa Carrington (women's K-1 200m), and rowers Mahé Drysdale (men's single sculls), and Hamish Bond and Eric Murray (men's pair). Sailors Peter Burling and Blair Tuke, who won silver in 2012, were selected as co-captains of the New Zealand team, with Burling acting as flagbearer for the opening ceremony.

The following is the list of number of competitors participating in the Games by sport and gender. Note that unused reserves in field hockey, football, and rugby sevens are not counted as competitors:

Sport	Men	Women	Total
Athletics	8	6	14
Canoeing	2	6	8
Cycling	12	8	20
Diving	0	1	1
Equestrian	3	2	5
Field hockey	16	16	32
Football	0	18	18
Golf	2	1	3
Gymnastics	2	1	3
Judo	0	1	1
Rowing	22	14	36
Rugby sevens	12	12	24
Sailing	7	5	12
Shooting	1	2	3
Swimming	6	3	9
Taekwondo	0	1	1
Tennis	2	0	2
Triathlon	2	2	4
Weightlifting	1	1	2
Wrestling	1	0	1
Total	99	100	199

== Officials ==
In December 2012, Rob Waddell was appointed New Zealand's chef de mission for the 2014 Commonwealth Games and 2016 Summer Olympics.

== Funding ==
High Performance Sport New Zealand (HPSNZ) invested NZ$158.6 million in elite-level Olympic sports and athletes over the 2013–16 funding cycle, of which $104.0 million was core funding to national sports organisations, while the remaining $54.5 million was mainly in the form of grants and tertiary scholarships to individual athletes. These totals includes funding for non-Olympic and Paralympic events such as world championships and the Commonwealth Games.

Funding breakdown per sport was as follows:

Sport	Total funding (thousands NZD)	Core funding (thousands NZD)
Rowing	32,069	19,815
Cycling	26,471	17,500
Sailing	18,363	12,450
Athletics	14,462	8,325
Equestrian	9,110	7,200
Swimming	8,458	5,600
Triathlon	7,606	5,300
Hockey (women)	9,378	5,200
Canoeing (sprint)	7,567	4,875
Rugby sevens (men)	5,321	4,800
Rugby sevens (women)	4,914	3,700
Football (women)	6,078	3,500
Hockey (men)	5,726	3,250
Other qualified sports	2,113	1,492
Non-qualified sports	996	954
Total	158,631	103,961

== Athletics (track and field) ==
New Zealand athletes achieved both the IAAF and Athletics New Zealand qualifying standards in the following athletics events (up to a maximum of 3 athletes in each event): The NZOC confirmed the first batch of track and field athletes on 22 April 2016, with Beijing 2008 silver medallist Nick Willis, javelin thrower Stuart Farquhar and two-time shot put champion Valerie Adams going to their fourth Olympics.

Key

- Note–Ranks given for track events are within the athlete's heat only
- Q = Qualified for the next round
- q = Qualified for the next round as a fastest loser or, in field events, by position without achieving the qualifying target
- NR = National record
- N/A = Round not applicable for the event
- Bye = Athlete not required to compete in round

Track & road events
Men

Athlete	Event	Heat		Semifinal		Final	
Athlete	Event	Result	Rank	Result	Rank	Result	Rank
Hamish Carson	1500 m	3:48.18	8	did not advance			
Julian Matthews	1500 m	3:40.40	9	did not advance			
Quentin Rew	20 km walk	—N/a				DSQ	
Quentin Rew	50 km walk	—N/a				3:49:32	12
Zane Robertson	10000 m	—N/a				27:33.67 NR	12
Nick Willis	1500 m	3:38.55	6 Q	3:39.96	3 Q	3:50.24	3rd place, bronze medalist(s)

Women

Athlete	Event	Heat		Semifinal		Final	
Athlete	Event	Result	Rank	Result	Rank	Result	Rank
Alana Barber	20 km walk	—N/a				1:35:55	35
Nikki Hamblin	1500 m	4:11.88	13	did not advance			
Nikki Hamblin	5000 m	16:43.61	15 q	—N/a		16:14.24	17
Lucy Oliver	5000 m	15:53.77	14	—N/a		did not advance	
Angie Petty	800 m	2:02.40	4	did not advance			

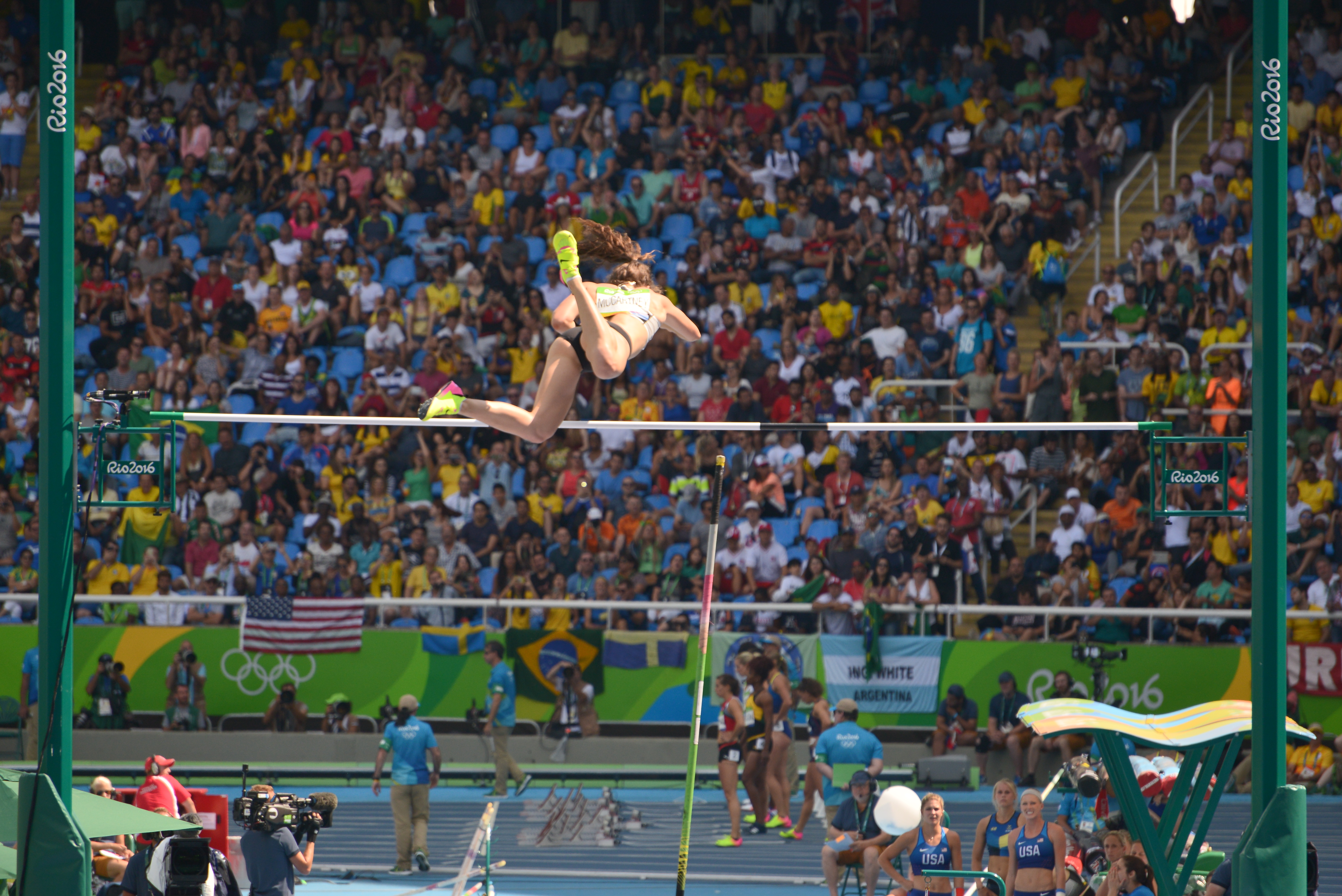
Eliza McCartney clears the bar during the qualifying round of the women's pole vault.

Field events

Athlete	Event	Qualification		Final	
Athlete	Event	Result	Rank	Result	Rank
Stuart Farquhar	Men's javelin throw	77.32	29	did not advance	
Jacko Gill	Men's shot put	20.80	4 Q	20.50	9
Tom Walsh	Men's shot put	21.03	2 Q	21.36	3rd place, bronze medalist(s)
Valerie Adams	Women's shot put	19.74	1 Q	20.42	2nd place, silver medalist(s)
Eliza McCartney	Women's pole vault	4.60	5 Q	4.80 NR	3rd place, bronze medalist(s)

== Canoeing ==
=== Slalom ===
New Zealand canoeists qualified a maximum of one boat in each of the following classes through the 2015 ICF Canoe Slalom World Championships. The NZOC named the slalom canoeing squad on 15 April 2016.

Athlete	Event	Preliminary						Semifinal		Final	
Athlete	Event	Run 1	Rank	Run 2	Rank	Best	Rank	Time	Rank	Time	Rank
Mike Dawson	Men's K-1	88.91	4	90.86	10	88.91	8 Q	91.47	5	93.07	10
Luuka Jones	Women's K-1	100.59	2	101.96	3	100.59	4 Q	108.05	7	101.82	2nd place, silver medalist(s)

=== Sprint ===
New Zealand canoeists qualified one boat in each of the following events through the 2015 ICF Canoe Sprint World Championships and the 2016 Oceania Championships. Six paddlers on the sprint canoeing team were named on 31 March 2016, including defending Olympic K-1 200-metre champion Lisa Carrington.

Athlete	Event	Heats		Semifinals		Final	
Athlete	Event	Time	Rank	Time	Rank	Time	Rank
Marty McDowell	Men's K-1 1000 m	3:39.58	20	did not advance			
Lisa Carrington	Women's K-1 200 m	40.422	3 Q	39.561	1 FA	39.864	1st place, gold medalist(s)
Lisa Carrington	Women's K-1 500 m	1:54.765	4 Q	1:56.155	2 FA	1:54.372	3rd place, bronze medalist(s)
Aimee Fisher; Kayla Imrie; Jaimee Lovett; Caitlin Ryan	Women's K-4 500 m	1:33.782	6 Q	1:34.778	2 FA	1:38.198	5

Qualification Legend: FA = Qualify to final (medal); FB = Qualify to final B (non-medal)

== Cycling ==
=== Road ===
New Zealand riders qualified for the following quota places in the men's and women's Olympic road race by virtue of their best national ranking in the 2015 UCI Oceania Tour (for men), and top 22 in the 2016 UCI World Ranking (for women).

Athlete	Event	Time	Rank
George Bennett	Men's road race	6:21:54	33
Zac Williams	Men's road race	Did not finish	
Linda Villumsen	Women's road race	3:56:34	23
Linda Villumsen	Women's time trial	44:54.71	6

=== Track ===
Following the completion of the 2016 UCI Track Cycling World Championships, New Zealand riders accumulated spots in both men's and women's team pursuit, and men's and women's team sprint, as well as both the men's and women's omnium. As a result of their place in the men's and women's team sprint, New Zealand was assured of its right to enter two riders in both men's and women's sprint and men's and women's keirin. The NZOC confirmed the first four cyclists on 7 April 2016.

Sprint

Athlete	Event	Qualification		Round 1	Repechage 1	Round 2	Repechage 2	Quarterfinals	Semifinals	Final	
Athlete	Event	Time Speed (km/h)	Rank	Opposition Time Speed (km/h)	Opposition Time Speed (km/h)	Opposition Time Speed (km/h)	Opposition Time Speed (km/h)	Opposition Time Speed (km/h)	Opposition Time Speed (km/h)	Opposition Time Speed (km/h)	Rank
Eddie Dawkins	Men's sprint	9.895; 72.764	10 Q	Webster (NZL); L	Levy (GER); Phillip (TTO); L	Did not advance					
Sam Webster	Men's sprint	9.880; 72.874	9 Q	Dawkins (NZL); W 10.159; 70.873	Bye	Dmitriev (RUS); L	Xu C (CHN); Puerta (COL); L	Did not advance		9th place final Levy (GER); Puerta (COL); Hoogland (NED); L	12
Natasha Hansen	Women's sprint	10.871 NR; 66.231	7 Q	O'Brien (CAN); W 11.400; 63.157	Bye	Vogel (GER); L	Krupeckaitė (LTU); Cueff (FRA); L	Did not advance		9th place final Meares (AUS); Welte (GER); Cueff (FRA); W 11.795	9
Olivia Podmore	Women's sprint	11.315; 63.632	23	did not advance							

Team sprint

Athlete	Event	Qualification		Semifinals		Final	
Athlete	Event	Time Speed (km/h)	Rank	Opposition Time Speed (km/h)	Rank	Opposition Time Speed (km/h)	Rank
Eddie Dawkins; Ethan Mitchell; Sam Webster	Men's team sprint	42.673; 63.271	2 Q	Germany; W 42.535 OR; 63.477	1 FA	Great Britain; L 42.542; 63.466	2nd place, silver medalist(s)
Natasha Hansen; Olivia Podmore	Women's team sprint	34.346; 52.407	9	did not advance			

Qualification legend: FA=Gold medal final; FB=Bronze medal final

Pursuit

Athlete	Event	Qualification		Semifinals		Final	
Athlete	Event	Time	Rank	Opponent Results	Rank	Opponent Results	Rank
Pieter Bulling; Aaron Gate; Regan Gough; Dylan Kennett; Hayden Roulston	Men's team pursuit	3:55.977	4 Q	Great Britain; 3:55.654	4	Denmark; 3:56.753	4
Rushlee Buchanan; Lauren Ellis; Jaime Nielsen; Racquel Sheath; Georgia Williams	Women's team pursuit	4:20.061	5 Q	Poland; 4:17.592	4	Canada; 4:18.459	4

Keirin

Athlete	Event	1st Round	Repechage	2nd Round	Final
Athlete	Event	Rank	Rank	Rank	Rank
Eddie Dawkins	Men's keirin	4 R	3	did not advance	
Sam Webster	Men's keirin	1 Q	Bye	6 FB	7
Natasha Hansen	Women's keirin	3 R	2	did not advance	
Olivia Podmore	Women's keirin	DNF R	5	did not advance	

Omnium

Athlete	Event	Scratch race		Individual pursuit			Elimination race		Time trial			Flying lap			Points race		Total points	Rank
Athlete	Event	Rank	Points	Time	Rank	Points	Rank	Points	Time	Rank	Points	Time	Rank	Points	Points	Rank	Total points	Rank
Dylan Kennett	Men's omnium	5	32	4:20.180	6	30	17	8	1:00.923	1	40	12.506	1	40	−7	15	143	8
Lauren Ellis	Women's omnium	5	32	3:33.221	6	30	11	20	36.427	11	20	14.574	14	14	73	2	189	4

=== Mountain biking ===
New Zealand qualified one mountain biker for the men's Olympic cross-country race, as a result of his nation's seventeenth-place finish in the UCI Olympic Ranking List of 25 May 2016. One additional spot was awarded to the female mountain biker, who won the cross-country race for New Zealand at the 2015 Oceania Championships. With Olympic selection criteria requiring riders to show top eight potential, the NZOC decided to only nominate one mountain biker to the Olympic roster, who was Sam Gaze for the men's cross-country event.

Athlete	Event	Time	Rank
Sam Gaze	Men's cross-country	LAP (1 lap)	37

=== BMX ===
New Zealand riders qualified for one men's quota place in BMX at the Olympics, as a result of the nation's eleventh-place finish in the UCI Olympic Ranking List of 31 May 2016. BMX rider and rookie Trent Jones was selected to the NZ Olympic roster on 10 June 2016.

Athlete	Event	Seeding		Quarterfinal		Semifinal		Final	
Athlete	Event	Result	Rank	Points	Rank	Points	Rank	Result	Rank
Trent Jones	Men's BMX	36.331	25	7	2 Q	17	7	did not advance	

== Diving ==
New Zealand has received an invitation from FINA to send a diver competing in the women's individual springboard to the Olympics, based on her results at the 2016 FINA World Cup series.

Athlete	Event	Preliminaries		Semifinals		Final	
Athlete	Event	Points	Rank	Points	Rank	Points	Rank
Elizabeth Cui	Women's 3 m springboard	273.30	24	did not advance			

== Equestrian ==
New Zealand equestrians qualified a full squad in the team eventing competition through the 2015 Asia and Pacific Eventing Championships in Boekelo, Netherlands. One dressage rider was later added to the squad by virtue of a top finish from Asia & Oceania in the individual FEI Olympic rankings. New Zealand's equestrian team was named on 27 June 2016. Jock Paget withdrew on 5 August 2016 after his horse, Clifton Lush, cut its cheek at the Rio stable and did not recover in time for the event. Reserve Tim Price and his horse Ringwood Sky Boy subsequently replaced Paget in the individual and team eventing.

=== Dressage ===
Athlete	Horse	Event	Grand Prix		Grand Prix Special		Grand Prix Freestyle		Overall	
Athlete	Horse	Event	Score	Rank	Score	Rank	Technical	Artistic	Score	Rank
Julie Brougham	Vom Feinsten	Individual	68.543	44	Did not advance					

=== Eventing ===
Athlete	Horse	Event	Dressage		Cross-country			Jumping						Total	
Athlete	Horse	Event	Dressage		Cross-country			Qualifier			Final			Total	
Athlete	Horse	Event	Penalties	Rank	Penalties	Total	Rank	Penalties	Total	Rank	Penalties	Total	Rank	Penalties	Rank
Clarke Johnstone	Balmoral Sensation	Individual	46.50	23	4.80	51.30	7	0.00	51.30	5	8.00	59.30	6	59.30	6
Jonelle Price	Faerie Dianimo	Individual	49.50 #	43	8.00	57.50	13	8.00	65.50	15	8.00	73.50	17	73.50	17
Tim Price	Ringwood Sky Boy	Individual	47.00	29	Eliminated			Did not advance							
Mark Todd	Leonidas II	Individual	44.00	17	2.00	46.00	4	16.00	62.00	11	0.00	62.00	7	62.00	7
Clarke Johnstone; Jonelle Price; Tim Price; Mark Todd	See above	Team	137.50	6		154.80	2	24.00	178.80	4	—N/a			178.80	4

"#" indicates that the score of this rider does not count in the team competition, since only the best three results of a team are counted.

== Field hockey ==
Summary

Key:

- FT – After full time.
- P – Match decided by penalty-shootout.

Team	Event	Group stage						Quarterfinal	Semifinal	Final / BM	
Team	Event	Opposition Score	Opposition Score	Opposition Score	Opposition Score	Opposition Score	Rank	Opposition Score	Opposition Score	Opposition Score	Rank
New Zealand men's	Men's tournament	Australia; L 1–2	Great Britain; D 2–2	Spain; L 2–3	Brazil; W 9–0	Belgium; W 3–1	4	Germany; L 2–3	Did not advance		7
New Zealand women's	Women's tournament	South Korea; W 4–1	Germany; L 1–2	Spain; W 2–1	Netherlands; D 1–1	China; W 3–0	2	Australia; W 4–2	Great Britain; L 0–3	Germany; L 1–2	4

=== Men's tournament ===
The New Zealand men's field hockey team qualified for the Olympics by having achieved the next highest placement in the 2014–15 Men's FIH Hockey World League Semifinals, among the countries that had not qualified yet for the Games.

Team roster

The following is the New Zealand roster in the men's field hockey tournament of the 2016 Summer Olympics.

Head coach: Colin Batch

1. James Coughlan
6. Simon Child (C)
9. Blair Hilton
10. Ryan Archibald
12. Bradley Shaw
17. Nic Woods
20. Devon Manchester (GK)
21. Kane Russell
22. Blair Tarrant
23. Shay Neal
24. Arun Panchia
25. Shea McAleese
27. Stephen Jenness
29. Hugo Inglis
31. Hayden Phillips
32. Nick Wilson

Reserves:

- Marcus Child
- Nick Haig

Group play

Pos	Team	Pld	W	D	L	GF	GA	GD	Pts	Qualification
1	Belgium	5	4	0	1	21	5	+16	12	Quarter-finals
2	Spain	5	3	1	1	13	6	+7	10	Quarter-finals
3	Australia	5	3	0	2	13	4	+9	9	Quarter-finals
4	New Zealand	5	2	1	2	17	8	+9	7	Quarter-finals
5	Great Britain	5	1	2	2	14	10	+4	5	
6	Brazil (H)	5	0	0	5	1	46	−45	0	

Source: Rio2016
Rules for classification: 1) Points; 2) Matches won; 3) Goal difference; 4) Goals for; 5) Head-to-head result.
(H) Hosts

6 August 2016
13:30

Australia	2–1	New Zealand
Ciriello 8'; Gohdes 23'	Report	Child 31'

Umpires:
Christian Blasch (GER)
Germán Montes de Oca (ARG)

7 August 2016
17:00

Great Britain	2–2	New Zealand
Condon 2'; Middleton 25'	Report	Russell 14'; Phillips 19'

Umpires:
Marcin Grochal (POL)
Lim Hong Zhen (SIN)

9 August 2016
10:00

New Zealand	2–3	Spain
Child 3', 30'	Report	Oliva 1'; Casasayas 10'; Lleonart 60'

Umpires:
Christian Blasch (GER)
Germán Montes de Oca (ARG)

10 August 2016
19:30

New Zealand	9–0	Brazil
Wilson 15', 19', 34', 41'; Shay 21'; Child 26'; Russell 30'; Jenness 45'; Woods 58'	Report

Umpires:
Javed Shaikh (IND)
Coen van Bunge (NED)

12 August 2016
18:00

Belgium	1–3	New Zealand
Van Aubel 58'	Report	Child 31'; Wilson 37'; Inglis 52'

Umpires:
Germán Montes de Oca (ARG)
John Wright (RSA)

Quarterfinal

14 August 2016
20:30

Germany	3–2	New Zealand
Fürste 56', 60'; Fuchs 60'	Report	Inglis 18'; McAleese 49'

Umpires:
Marcelo Servetto (ESP)
Murray Grime (AUS)

=== Women's tournament ===
The New Zealand women's field hockey team qualified for the Olympics by having achieved a top four finish at the second stop of the 2014–15 Women's FIH Hockey World League Semifinals. Only three nations qualified through this route, but South Korea had already secured qualification as continental champions and Brazil failed to meet IOC and FIH criteria to qualify as host nation, opening places up for the fourth-placed teams.

Team roster

The following is the New Zealand roster in the women's field hockey tournament of the 2016 Summer Olympics.

Head coach: Mark Hager

No.	Pos.	Player	Date of birth (age)	Caps	Goals	Club
1	MF	Kayla Whitelock (C)	30 October 1985 (aged 30)	247	62	(New Zealand) Central
4	FW	Olivia Merry	16 March 1992 (aged 24)	132	51	(New Zealand) Canterbury
6	FW	Petrea Webster	30 March 1988 (aged 28)	144	36	(New Zealand) North Harbour
8	GK	Sally Rutherford	5 June 1981 (aged 35)	118	0	(New Zealand) Midlands
9	DF	Brooke Neal	4 July 1992 (aged 24)	88	5	(New Zealand) Northland
13	DF	Sam Charlton	7 December 1991 (aged 24)	171	5	(New Zealand) Midlands
16	DF	Liz Thompson	8 December 1994 (aged 21)	114	9	(New Zealand) Auckland
17	FW	Sophie Cocks	25 July 1994 (aged 22)	107	28	(New Zealand) Canterbury
18	FW	Kirsten Pearce	10 April 1991 (aged 25)	53	18	(New Zealand) North Harbour
22	MF	Gemma Flynn	2 May 1990 (aged 26)	238	68	(New Zealand) Midlands
23	FW	Charlotte Harrison	31 July 1989 (aged 27)	214	63	(New Zealand) Auckland
24	DF	Rose Keddell	31 January 1994 (aged 22)	128	9	(New Zealand) Midlands
25	MF	Kelsey Smith	12 August 1994 (aged 21)	20	3	(New Zealand) Capital
26	DF	Pippa Hayward	23 May 1990 (aged 26)	109	11	(New Zealand) Canterbury
31	MF	Stacey Michelsen	18 February 1991 (aged 25)	208	24	(New Zealand) Northland
32	MF	Anita McLaren	2 October 1987 (aged 28)	239	94	(New Zealand) Capital

Group play

Pos	Team	Pld	W	D	L	GF	GA	GD	Pts	Qualification
1	Netherlands	5	4	1	0	13	1	+12	13	Quarter-finals
2	New Zealand	5	3	1	1	11	5	+6	10	Quarter-finals
3	Germany	5	2	1	2	6	6	0	7	Quarter-finals
4	Spain	5	2	0	3	6	12	−6	6	Quarter-finals
5	China	5	1	2	2	3	5	−2	5	
6	South Korea	5	0	1	4	3	13	−10	1	

Source: Rio2016
Rules for classification: 1) Points; 2) Matches won; 3) Goal difference; 4) Goals for; 5) Head-to-head result.

7 August 2016
10:00

New Zealand	4–1	South Korea
Pearce 10'; Harrison 19'; Flynn 21'; Webster 34'	Report	Kim H. 55'

Umpires:
Fanneke Alkemade (NED)
Chieko Soma (JPN)

8 August 2016
13:30

New Zealand	1–2	Germany
Webster 10'	Report	Oldhafer 22'; Schröder 44'

Umpires:
Soledad Iparraguiree (ARG)
Miao Lin (CHN)

10 August 2016
10:00

Spain	1–2	New Zealand
Petchame 60'	Report	Smith 22', 51'

Umpires:
Irene Presenqui (ARG)
Elena Eskina (RUS)

12 August 2016
11:00

New Zealand	1–1	Netherlands
Whitelock 59'	Report	Paumen 28'

Umpires:
Carolina de la Fuente (ARG)
Michelle Joubert (RSA)

13 August 2016
20:30

China	0–3	New Zealand
	Report	Merry 21'; Flynn 41'; McLaren 42'

Umpires:
Amy Baxter (USA)
Kylie Seymour (AUS)

Quarterfinal

15 August 2016
10:00

New Zealand	4–2	Australia
McLaren 7'; Smith 24'; Flynn 39'; Merry 44'	Report	Slattery 33', 59'

Umpires:
Irene Presenqui (ARG)
Sarah Wilson (GBR)

Semifinal

17 August 2016
17:00

New Zealand	0–3	Great Britain
	Report	Danson 22', 52'; H. Richardson-Walsh 48'

Umpires:
Carolina de la Fuente (ARG)
Michelle Joubert (RSA)

Bronze medal match

19 August 2016
12:00

Germany	2–1	New Zealand
Stapenhorst 34'; Schütze 38'	Report	Merry 45+'

Umpires:
Irene Presenqui (ARG)
Sarah Wilson (GBR)

== Football ==
=== Women's tournament ===
The New Zealand women's football team qualified for the Olympics by winning the 2016 OFC Women's Olympic Qualifying Tournament, after Papua New Guinea withdrew from the second leg in Auckland.

Team roster

Head coach: (United Kingdom) Tony Readings

New Zealand named a squad of 18 players and 4 alternates for the tournament, which was announced on 4 July 2016.

No.	Pos.	Player	Date of birth (age)	Caps	Goals	Club
1	GK	Erin Nayler	17 April 1992 (aged 24)	40	0	(New Zealand Football) Norwest United
2	DF	Ria Percival	7 December 1989 (aged 26)	116	11	(Swiss Football Association) FC Basel
3	DF	Anna Green	20 August 1990 (aged 25)	60	7	(Swedish Football Association) Mallbacken
4	MF	Katie Duncan	1 February 1988 (aged 28)	115	1	(Swiss Football Association) FC Zürich
5	DF	Abby Erceg (captain)	20 November 1989 (aged 26)	126	6	(United States Soccer Federation) Western New York Flash
6	DF	Rebekah Stott	17 June 1993 (aged 23)	49	4	(New Zealand Football) Claudelands Rovers
7	DF	Ali Riley	30 October 1987 (aged 28)	101	1	(Swedish Football Association) FC Rosengård
8	FW	Jasmine Pereira	20 July 1996 (aged 20)	18	0	(New Zealand Football) Three Kings United
9	FW	Amber Hearn	28 November 1984 (aged 31)	112	50	(German Football Association) USV Jena
10	FW	Sarah Gregorius	6 August 1987 (aged 28)	78	24	(Japan Football Association) Speranza FC Osaka-Takatsuki
11	MF	Kirsty Yallop	4 November 1986 (aged 29)	99	12	(Swedish Football Association) Mallbacken
12	MF	Betsy Hassett	4 August 1990 (aged 25)	91	8	(German Football Association) Werder Bremen
13	FW	Rosie White	6 June 1993 (aged 23)	81	14	(The Football Association) Liverpool
14	MF	Katie Bowen	15 April 1994 (aged 22)	37	1	(United States Soccer Federation) FC Kansas City
15	DF	Meikayla Moore	4 June 1996 (aged 20)	14	0	(New Zealand Football) Cashmere Technical
16	MF	Annalie Longo	1 July 1991 (aged 25)	91	8	(New Zealand Football) Cashmere Technical
17	FW	Hannah Wilkinson	28 May 1992 (aged 24)	74	23	(United States Soccer Federation) University of Tennessee
18	GK	Rebecca Rolls	22 August 1975 (aged 40)	22	0	(New Zealand Football) Three Kings United

Group play

Pos	Team	Pld	W	D	L	GF	GA	GD	Pts	Qualification
1	United States	3	2	1	0	5	2	+3	7	Quarter-finals
2	France	3	2	0	1	7	1	+6	6	Quarter-finals
3	New Zealand	3	1	0	2	1	5	−4	3	
4	Colombia	3	0	1	2	2	7	−5	1	

Source: Rio2016 & FIFA
Rules for classification: Tiebreakers
3 August 2016
19:00

United States	2–0	New Zealand
Lloyd 9'; Morgan 46'	Report (Rio2016); Report (FIFA)

Mineirão, Belo Horizonte
Attendance: 10,059
Referee: Kateryna Monzul (Ukraine)

6 August 2016
20:00

Colombia	0–1	New Zealand
	Report (Rio2016); Report (FIFA)	Hearn 31'

Mineirão, Belo Horizonte
Attendance: 8,505
Referee: Gladys Lengwe (Zambia)

9 August 2016
19:00

New Zealand	0–3	France
	Report (Rio2016); Report (FIFA)	Le Sommer 38'; Cadamuro 63', 90+2' (pen.)

Itaipava Arena Fonte Nova, Salvador
Attendance: 7,350
Referee: Lucila Venegas (Mexico)

== Golf ==
New Zealand entered three golfers (two males and one female) into the Olympic tournament. Danny Lee (world no. 40), Ryan Fox (world no. 184) and Korean-born Lydia Ko (world no. 1) qualified directly among the top 60 eligible players for their respective individual events based on the IGF World Rankings as of 11 July 2016. Cathryn Bristow (world no. 443) also qualified but was not selected.

Athlete	Event	Round 1	Round 2	Round 3	Round 4	Total		
Athlete	Event	Score	Score	Score	Score	Score	Par	Rank
Ryan Fox	Men's	70	73	74	68	285	1	39
Danny Lee	Men's	72	65	76	69	282	−2	27
Lydia Ko	Women's	69	70	65	69	273	−11	2nd place, silver medalist(s)

== Gymnastics ==
The NZOC confirmed three gymnasts to compete on 11 May 2016, marking the first time that New Zealand gymnasts have competed at the Olympics since 2000, and New Zealand's largest gymnastics team since 1964.

=== Artistic ===
Russian-born Mikhail Koudinov and Christchurch's Courtney McGregor claimed their Olympic spots each in the men's and women's apparatus and all-around events, respectively, at the Olympic Test Event in Rio de Janeiro.

Men

Athlete	Event	Qualification								Final							
Athlete	Event	Apparatus						Total	Rank	Apparatus						Total	Rank
Athlete	Event	F	PH	R	V	PB	HB	Total	Rank	F	PH	R	V	PB	HB	Total	Rank
Mikhail Koudinov	All-around	13.200	12.600	13.433	13.799	14.700	12.833	80.899	45	Did not advance							

Women

Athlete	Event	Qualification						Final					
Athlete	Event	Apparatus				Total	Rank	Apparatus				Total	Rank
Athlete	Event	V	UB	BB	F	Total	Rank	V	UB	BB	F	Total	Rank
Courtney McGregor	All-around	14.333	12.433	13.000	13.066	53.165	41	Did not advance					

=== Trampoline ===
For the first time in Olympic history, New Zealand qualified one gymnast in the men's trampoline by virtue of a top six finish at the 2016 Olympic Test Event in Rio de Janeiro.

Athlete	Event	Qualification		Final	
Athlete	Event	Score	Rank	Score	Rank
Dylan Schmidt	Men's	107.660	8 Q	57.140	7

== Judo ==
New Zealand qualified one judoka for the women's lightweight category (57 kg) at the Games. Darcina Manuel earned a continental quota spot from the Oceania region as New Zealand's top-ranked judoka outside of direct qualifying position in the IJF World Ranking List of 30 May 2016. She was confirmed by the NZOC on 17 June 2016.

Athlete	Event	Round of 32	Round of 16	Quarterfinals	Semifinals	Repechage	Final / BM	
Athlete	Event	Opposition Result	Opposition Result	Opposition Result	Opposition Result	Opposition Result	Opposition Result	Rank
Darcina Manuel	Women's −57 kg	Zabludina (RUS); W 001–000	Monteiro (POR); L 000–002	Did not advance				

== Rowing ==
New Zealand qualified ten out of a possible fourteen boats for each of the rowing classes listed below. The majority of the rowing crews confirmed Olympic places for their boats at the 2015 FISA World Championships in Lac d'Aiguebelette, France, while a women's single sculls rower had added one more boat to the New Zealand roster as a result of a top three finish at the 2016 European & Final Qualification Regatta in Lucerne, Switzerland. The crews had to have also competed at the NZ Rowing Championships, held in Lake Karapiro, to assure their selection to the Olympic team for the Games.

The rowing team was named on 4 March 2016, featuring 2012 Olympic champions Mahé Drysdale in men's single sculls and Hamish Bond and Eric Murray in the men's pair.

On 1 July 2016, the Russian men's quadruple sculls boat was disqualified due to a doping violation, resulting in New Zealand gaining the men's quadruple sculls slot as the next-best non-qualifier.

For the first time in Olympic history, New Zealand rowers participated in the men's lightweight four and the women's eight.

Men

Athlete	Event	Heats		Repechage		Quarterfinals		Semifinals		Final	
Athlete	Event	Time	Rank	Time	Rank	Time	Rank	Time	Rank	Time	Rank
Mahé Drysdale	Single sculls	7:04.45	1 QF	Bye		6:46.51	1 SA/B	7:03.70	2 FA	6:41.34	1st place, gold medalist(s)
Hamish Bond; Eric Murray	Pair	6:41.75	1 SA/B	Bye		—N/a		6:23.36	1 FA	6:59.71	1st place, gold medalist(s)
Chris Harris; Robbie Manson	Double sculls	6:40.35	1 SA/B	Bye		—N/a		6:17.01	4 FB	7:06.80	11
Alistair Bond; James Hunter; James Lassche; Peter Taylor	Lightweight four	6:03.34	1 SA/B	Bye		—N/a		6:08.96	3 FA	6:28.14	5
George Bridgewater; Nathan Flannery; John Storey; Jade Uru	Quadruple sculls	5:59.13	4 R	5:58.92	6 FB	—N/a				6:18.92	10
Michael Brake; Isaac Grainger; Stephen Jones; Alex Kennedy; Shaun Kirkham; Tom Murray; Brook Robertson; Joe Wright; Caleb Shepherd (cox)	Eight	5:36:28	3 R	5:56.94	3 FA	—N/a				5:36.64	6

Women

Athlete	Event	Heats		Repechage		Quarterfinals		Semifinals		Final	
Athlete	Event	Time	Rank	Time	Rank	Time	Rank	Time	Rank	Time	Rank
Emma Twigg	Single sculls	8:17.02	1 QF	Bye		7:31.79	1 SA/B	7:48.20	2 FA	7:24.48	4
Genevieve Behrent; Rebecca Scown	Pair	7:09.23	1 SA/B	Bye		—N/a		7:29.67	2 FA	7:19.53	2nd place, silver medalist(s)
Eve Macfarlane; Zoe Stevenson	Double sculls	7:14.31	1 SA/B	Bye		—N/a		6:52.97	4 FB	7:50.74	12
Julia Edward; Sophie MacKenzie	Lightweight double sculls	7:02.01	2 SA/B	Bye		—N/a		7:19.27	2 FA	7:10.61	4
Genevieve Behrent; Kelsey Bevan; Emma Dyke; Kerri Gowler; Kayla Pratt; Grace Prendergast; Rebecca Scown; Ruby Tew; Francie Turner (cox)	Eight	6:12.05	2 R	6:34.90	3 FA	—N/a				6:05.48	4

Qualification Legend: FA=Final A (medal); FB=Final B (non-medal); FC=Final C (non-medal); FD=Final D (non-medal); FE=Final E (non-medal); FF=Final F (non-medal); SA/B=Semifinals A/B; SC/D=Semifinals C/D; SE/F=Semifinals E/F; QF=Quarterfinals; R=Repechage

== Rugby sevens ==
=== Men's tournament ===
The New Zealand men's rugby sevens team qualified for the Olympics by having achieved one of the top four places at the 2014–15 Sevens World Series. Teddy Stanaway withdrew due to injury, he was replaced by Lewis Ormond. The travelling reserves were Liam Messam and Sione Molia. The New Zealand team lost its tournament opening game against Japan; this was the country's first loss against Japan in any rugby discipline. Sonny Bill Williams received an injury in that match and missed the rest of the tournament, being replaced by Molia.

Team roster

The following is the New Zealand roster in the men's rugby sevens tournament of the 2016 Summer Olympics.

Head coach: Gordon Tietjens

No.	Pos.	Player	Date of birth (age)	Events	Points	Union
1	FW	Scott Curry (c)	17 May 1988 (aged 28)	31	360	(New Zealand) Bay of Plenty
2	BK	Tim Mikkelson	13 August 1986 (aged 29)	62	882	(New Zealand) Waikato
3	FW	Akira Ioane	16 June 1995 (aged 21)	9	77	(New Zealand) Blues
4	FW	DJ Forbes	15 December 1982 (aged 33)	79	687	(New Zealand) Counties Manukau
5	BK	Lewis Ormond	5 February 1994 (aged 22)	8	82	(New Zealand) Taranaki
6	BK	Augustine Pulu	4 January 1990 (aged 26)	6	45	(New Zealand) Blues
7	FW	Sam Dickson	28 October 1989 (aged 26)	29	232	(New Zealand) Canterbury
8	BK	Gillies Kaka	28 May 1990 (aged 26)	30	721	(New Zealand) Hawke's Bay
9	BK	Regan Ware	7 August 1994 (aged 21)	9	85	(New Zealand) Bay of Plenty
10	BK	Rieko Ioane	18 March 1997 (aged 19)	10	265	(New Zealand) Blues
11	BK	Joe Webber	27 August 1993 (aged 22)	23	357	(New Zealand) Bay of Plenty
12	BK	Sonny Bill Williams	3 August 1985 (aged 31)	6	20	(New Zealand) Blues
13	BK	Sione Molia	5 September 1993 (aged 22)	6	35	(New Zealand) Counties Manukau

Group play

Pos	Team	Pld	W	D	L	PF	PA	PD	Pts	Qualification
1	Great Britain	3	3	0	0	73	45	+28	9	Quarter-finals
2	Japan	3	2	0	1	64	40	+24	7	Quarter-finals
3	New Zealand	3	1	0	2	59	40	+19	5	Quarter-finals
4	Kenya	3	0	0	3	19	90	−71	3	

Source: World Rugby
Rules for classification: 1) Points; 2) Head-to-head result; 3) Point difference; 4) Points scored.

9 August 2016
12:30

New Zealand	12–14	Japan
Try: Curry 6' c A. Ioane 10' m Con: Kaka (1/2)	Report (Rio 2016); Report (World Rugby)	Try: Goto 3' c Soejima 12' c Con: Lemeki (1/1); Sakai (1/1)

Deodoro Stadium, Rio de Janeiro
Referee: Marius van der Westhuizen (South Africa)

9 August 2016
17:30

New Zealand	28–5	Kenya
Try: Penalty try 3' c Ioane 4' c Pulu 11' c Ormond 14' c Con: Pulu (3/3); Kaka (1/1)	Report (Rio 2016); Report (World Rugby)	Try: Injera 1' m Con: Adema (0/1)

Deodoro Stadium, Rio de Janeiro
Referee: Federico Anselmi (Argentina)

10 August 2016
12:30

New Zealand	19–21	Great Britain
Try: R. Ioane 9' m Ware 11' c Ormond 13' c Con: Kaka (2/3)	Report (Rio 2016); Report (World Rugby)	Try: Bennett 2' c Davies 5' c Norton 7' c Con: Mitchell (3/3)

Deodoro Stadium, Rio de Janeiro
Referee: Craig Joubert (South Africa)

Quarterfinal

10 August 2016
17:00

Fiji	12–7	New Zealand
Try: Kolinisau 2' m Tuwai 8' c Con: Ravouvou (0/1); Kolinisau (1/1)	Report (Rio 2016); Report (World Rugby)	Try: Kaka 6' c Con: Pulu (1/1)

Deodoro Stadium, Rio de Janeiro
Referee: Rasta Rasivhenge (South Africa)

Classification semifinal (5–8)

11 August 2016
13:30

New Zealand	24–19	France
Try: Ware (2) 2' m, 12' c A. Ioane 8' m R. Ioane 10' c Con: Kaka (2/4)	Report (Rio 2016); Report (World Rugby)	Try: Parez (2) 4' c, 7' m Valleau 14' c Con: Bouhraoua (2/3)

Deodoro Stadium, Rio de Janeiro
Referee: Federico Anselmi (Argentina)

Fifth place game

11 August 2016
18:00

New Zealand	17–14	Argentina
Try: A. Ioane 5' m Mikkelson 9' m R. Ioane 11' c Con: Pulu (0/2); Kaka (1/1)	Report (Rio 2016); Report (World Rugby)	Try: Imhoff 13' c Moroni 14' c Con: Revol (2/2)

Deodoro Stadium, Rio de Janeiro
Referee: Craig Joubert (South Africa)

=== Women's tournament ===
The New Zealand women's rugby sevens team qualified for the Olympics by having achieved one of the top four places at the 2014–15 Sevens World Series.

Team roster

The following is the New Zealand roster in the women's rugby sevens tournament of the 2016 Summer Olympics.

Head coach: Sean Horan

Backs		Forwards
6	Gayle Broughton	1	Ruby Tui
7	Tyla Nathan-Wong	2	Shakira Baker
8	Kelly Brazier	3	Terina Te Tamaki
10	Theresa Fitzpatrick	4	Niall Williams
11	Portia Woodman	5	Sarah Goss (c)
12	Kayla McAlister	9	Huriana Manuel

Group play

Pos	Team	Pld	W	D	L	PF	PA	PD	Pts	Qualification
1	New Zealand	3	3	0	0	109	12	+97	9	Quarter-finals
2	France	3	2	0	1	71	40	+31	7	Quarter-finals
3	Spain	3	1	0	2	31	65	−34	5	Quarter-finals
4	Kenya	3	0	0	3	17	111	−94	3	

Source: World Rugby
Rules for classification: 1) Points; 2) Head-to-head result; 3) Point difference; 4) Points scored.

6 August 2016
11:30

New Zealand	52–0	Kenya
Try: Woodman (3) 1' c, 8' c, 13' m McAlister (2) 3' c, 14' m Manuel 6' c Broughton 10' c Williams 14' c Con: Nathan-Wong (5/6); Brazier (1/2)	Report (Rio 2016); Report (World Rugby)

Deodoro Stadium, Rio de Janeiro
Referee: Sara Cox (Great Britain)

6 August 2016
16:30

New Zealand	31–5	Spain
Try: Woodman 2' m McAlister (2) 3' c, 12' m Nathan-Wong 8' c Fitzpatrick 14' c Con: Nathan-Wong (3/5)	Report (Rio 2016); Report (World Rugby)	Try: Casado 11' m Con: P. García (0/1)

Deodoro Stadium, Rio de Janeiro
Referee: Gabriel Lee (Hong Kong)

7 August 2016
11:30

New Zealand	26–7	France
Try: Brazier 1' c Manuel 3' c Woodman 6' m McAlister 13' c Con: Nathan-Wong (3/4)	Report (Rio 2016); Report (World Rugby)	Try: Grassineau 7' c Con: Biscarat (1/1)

Deodoro Stadium, Rio de Janeiro
Referee: Rasta Rasivhenge (South Africa)

Quarterfinal

7 August 2016
18:30

New Zealand	5–0	United States
Try: Woodman 7' m Con: Nathan-Wong (0/1)	Report (Rio 2016); Report (World Rugby)

Deodoro Stadium, Rio de Janeiro
Referee: Rasta Rasivhenge (South Africa)

Semifinal

8 August 2016
15:00

Great Britain	7–25	New Zealand
Try: Richardson 4' c Con: McLean (1/1)	Report (Rio 2016); Report (World Rugby)	Try: Woodman (3) 2' m, 7' m, 8' m Tui 5' m Manuel 10' m Con: Nathan-Wong (0/5)

Deodoro Stadium, Rio de Janeiro
Referee: Amy Perrett (Australia)

Gold medal match

8 August 2016
19:00

(gold) Australia	24–17	New Zealand (silver)
Try: Tonegato 7' m Pelite 10' m Green 12' c Caslick 15' c Con: Dalton (2/4)	Report 1 Report 2	Try: McAlister (2) 4' m, 18' m Woodman 20' c Con: Nathan-Wong (1/3)

Deodoro Stadium, Rio de Janeiro
Referee: Alhambra Nievas (Spain)

Team details

Australia
New Zealand

F	1	Shannon Parry
F	2	Sharni Williams (c)
F	8	Charlotte Caslick
B	7	Charlotte Caslick
B	11	Emilee Cherry
B	10	Alicia Quirk
B	5	Emma Tonegato
Head Coach:
(Australia) Tim Walsh

F	5	Sarah Goss (c)
F	9	Huriana Manuel
F	1	Ruby Tui
B	8	Tyla Nathan-Wong
B	12	Kayla McAlister
B	7	Tyla Nathan-Wong
B	11	Portia Woodman
Head Coach:
(New Zealand) Sean Horan

== Sailing ==
New Zealand qualified one boat for each of the following classes at the 2014 ISAF Sailing World Championships, bringing the maximum quota of 15 sailors, in ten boats. The first ten sailors competing in five double-handed classes were named on 14 March 2016, including defending Olympic champions Jo Aleh and Polly Powrie and 2012 silver medallists Peter Burling and Blair Tuke The remaining two sailors competing in the single-handed classes were named on 10 May 2016.

On 12 March 2016, London 2012 windsurfer JP Tobin announced his decision not to compete at the Games, citing a lack of financial support from Yachting New Zealand (YNZ). On 2 June 2016, the NZ Sports Tribunal and YNZ had upheld their decision not to nominate windsurfer Natalia Kosinska and Laser Radial sailor Sara Winther on the sailing team for failing to achieve the federation's selection standards, following appeals. As a result, New Zealand did not field any windsurfers at the Olympics for the first time in 36 years.

Men

Athlete	Event	Race													Net points	Final rank
Athlete	Event	1	2	3	4	5	6	7	8	9	10	11	12	M*	Net points	Final rank
Sam Meech	Laser	~~19~~	3	5	6	14	17	13	6	12	1	—N/a		8	85	3rd place, bronze medalist(s)
Josh Junior	Finn	18	~~24~~	14	14	5	3	18	2	4	6	—N/a		8	92	7
Paul Snow-Hansen; Daniel Willcox	470	2	10	20	15	~~23~~	5	2	13	10	15	—N/a		12	104	10
Peter Burling; Blair Tuke	49er	1	1	5	2	~~7~~	6	2	3	1	3	5	4	2	33	1st place, gold medalist(s)

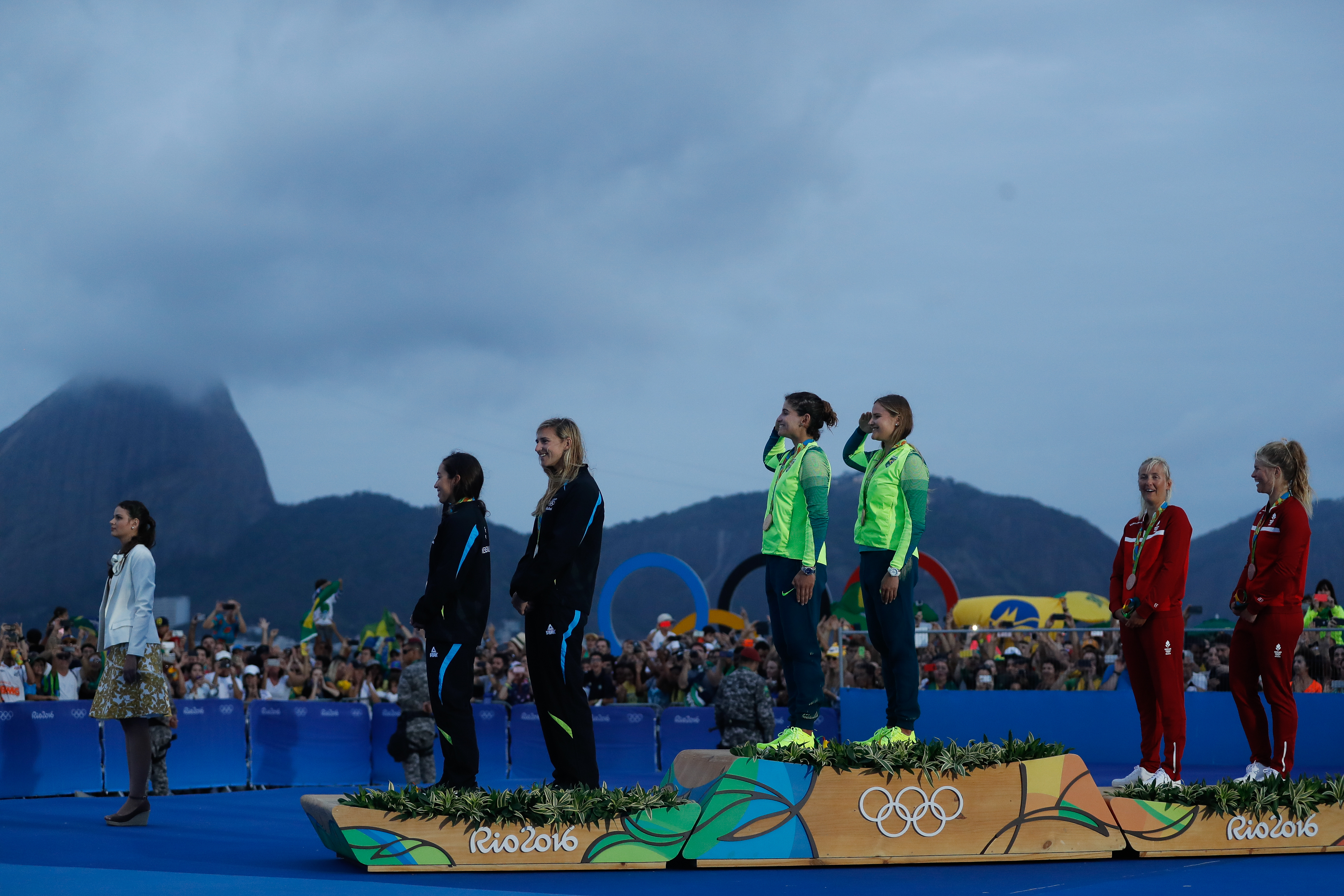
49erFX medal ceremony (l-r) Alex Maloney, Molly Meech (New Zealand); Martine Grael, Kahena Kunze (Brazil); Jena Mai Hansen, Katja Salskov-Iversen (Denmark)

Women

Athlete	Event	Race													Net points	Final rank
Athlete	Event	1	2	3	4	5	6	7	8	9	10	11	12	M*	Net points	Final rank
Jo Aleh; Polly Powrie	470	~~21~~; ~~DSQ~~	1	4	1	12	21; DSQ	3	1	1	4	—N/a		6	54	2nd place, silver medalist(s)
Alex Maloney; Molly Meech	49erFX	6	5	4	4	5	1	6	~~12~~	3	3	5	5	4	51	2nd place, silver medalist(s)

Mixed

Athlete	Event	Race													Net points	Final rank
Athlete	Event	1	2	3	4	5	6	7	8	9	10	11	12	M*	Net points	Final rank
Jason Saunders; Gemma Jones	Nacra 17	9	~~13~~	7	5	4	2	4	8	12	13	13	2	2	81	4

M = Medal race; EL = Eliminated – did not advance into the medal race

== Shooting ==
New Zealand shooters achieved quota places for the following events by virtue of their best finishes at the 2014 and 2015 ISSF World Championships, the 2015 ISSF World Cup series, and Oceanian Championships, and obtaining a minimum qualifying score (MQS) before 31 March 2016. The NZOC named the shooting team on 13 April 2016.

Athlete	Event	Qualification		Semifinal		Final	
Athlete	Event	Points	Rank	Points	Rank	Points	Rank
Ryan Taylor	Men's 50 m rifle prone	622.4	16	—N/a		did not advance	
Natalie Rooney	Women's trap	68	4 Q	13 (+1)	2 Q	11	2nd place, silver medalist(s)
Chloe Tipple	Women's skeet	67	13	did not advance			

Qualification Legend: Q = Qualify for the next round; q = Qualify for the bronze medal (shotgun)

== Swimming ==
New Zealand swimmers achieved qualifying standards in the following events (up to a maximum of 2 swimmers in each event at the Olympic Qualifying Time (OQT), and potentially 1 at the Olympic Selection Time (OST)): To assure their selection to the Olympic team, swimmers attained an Olympic qualifying cut in each of their individual events at the New Zealand Olympic Trials in Auckland (March 28 to April 1) and the Canadian Olympic Trials in Toronto (April 5 to 10).

The NZOC announced the full swimming team on 15 April 2016, including two-time Olympic breaststroker Glenn Snyders and distance freestyle ace Lauren Boyle. Open water swimmer Kane Radford earned an additional place on the NZ Olympic team, as Oceania's top-ranked representative outside the world's top ten of the men's 10 km (6.2 mi) marathon at the World Olympic Qualifier in Setúbal, Portugal, which was eventually rejected by Swimming New Zealand. On 27 June 2016, Radford was nominated to the NZOC, following his successful appeal to the NZ Sport Tribunal. Boyle, one of New Zealand medal hopes, struggled with illness during her Olympic preparations and did not advance beyond the heat.

Men

Athlete	Event	Heat		Semifinal		Final	
Athlete	Event	Time	Rank	Time	Rank	Time	Rank
Bradlee Ashby	200 m butterfly	2:01.22	29	Did not advance			
Bradlee Ashby	200 m individual medley	1:59.77	16 Q	2:00.45	14	Did not advance	
Matthew Hutchins	400 m freestyle	3:48.25	19	—N/a		Did not advance	
Matthew Hutchins	1500 m freestyle	15:32.60	38	—N/a		Did not advance	
Corey Main	100 m backstroke	53.99	16 Q	54.29	15	Did not advance	
Corey Main	200 m backstroke	1:57.51	15 Q	1:58.08	14	Did not advance	
Kane Radford	10 km open water	—N/a				1:53:18.7	18
Glenn Snyders	100 m breaststroke	1:00.26	=16 Q	1:00.50	15	Did not advance	
Glenn Snyders	200 m breaststroke	2:12.47	23	Did not advance			
Matthew Stanley	100 m freestyle	50.14	42	Did not advance			
Matthew Stanley	200 m freestyle	1:47.37	20	Did not advance			

Women

Athlete	Event	Heat		Semifinal		Final	
Athlete	Event	Time	Rank	Time	Rank	Time	Rank
Lauren Boyle	400 m freestyle	4:07.90	14	—N/a		did not advance	
Lauren Boyle	800 m freestyle	8:25.84	9	—N/a		Did not advance	
Helena Gasson	100 m butterfly	59.82	32	Did not advance			
Helena Gasson	200 m butterfly	2:12.18	25	Did not advance			
Emma Robinson	800 m freestyle	8:33.73	16	—N/a		Did not advance	

== Taekwondo ==
New Zealand entered one athlete into the taekwondo competition. Andrea Kilday secured a spot in the women's flyweight category (49 kg) by virtue of her top finish at the 2016 Oceania Qualification Tournament in Port Moresby, Papua New Guinea.

Athlete	Event	Round of 16	Quarterfinals	Semifinals	Repechage	Final / BM	
Athlete	Event	Opposition Result	Opposition Result	Opposition Result	Opposition Result	Opposition Result	Rank
Andrea Kilday	Women's −49 kg	Sing (BRA); L 5–7	Did not advance				

== Tennis ==
New Zealand entered two tennis players into the Olympic tournament. Marcus Daniell and Michael Venus claimed one of ITF Olympic men's doubles places, as the New Zealand's top-ranked tennis pair outside of direct qualifying position in the ATP World Rankings as of June 6, 2016.

Athlete	Event	Round of 32	Round of 16	Quarterfinals	Semifinals	Final / BM	
Athlete	Event	Opposition Score	Opposition Score	Opposition Score	Opposition Score	Opposition Score	Rank
Marcus Daniell; Michael Venus	Men's doubles	Nestor / Pospisil (CAN); L 6–4, 3–6, 6–7^{(6–8)}	Did not advance				

== Triathlon ==
New Zealand has qualified a total of four triathletes for the following events at the Olympics. Two-time Olympian and world no. 2 seed Andrea Hewitt became the first triathlete to secure a spot on the New Zealand team, as a result of her top 10 finish at the ITU World Olympic Qualification Event in Rio de Janeiro. The NZOC confirmed three more triathletes on 25 May 2016.

Athlete	Event	Swim (1.5 km)	Trans 1	Bike (40 km)	Trans 2	Run (10 km)	Total Time	Rank
Tony Dodds	Men's	17:31	0:47	56:24	0:36	33:06	1:48:24	21
Ryan Sissons	Men's	17:34	0:48	56:20	0:34	32:45	1:48:01	17
Andrea Hewitt	Women's	19:04	0:56	1:01:28	0:41	36:06	1:58:15	7
Nicky Samuels	Women's	19:06	0:56	1:01:27	0:43	37:18	1:59:30	13

== Weightlifting ==
New Zealand qualified one male and one female weightlifter for the Rio Olympics by virtue of a top five finish (for men) and top four (for women), respectively, at the 2016 Oceania Championships. The NZOC named the weightlifting team on 28 June 2016.

Athlete	Event	Snatch		Clean & jerk		Total	Rank
Athlete	Event	Result	Rank	Result	Rank	Total	Rank
Richie Patterson	Men's −85 kg	149	17	181	16	330	16
Tracey Lambrechs	Women's +75 kg	98	15	133	13	231	13

== Wrestling ==
New Zealand received a spare continental berth freed up by Australia to send a wrestler to compete in the men's Greco-Roman 66 kg to the Olympics, signifying the nation's return to the sport for the first time since 2000. The berth was awarded to Craig Miller, who finished third at the 2016 African & Oceania Qualification Tournament in Algiers, Algeria, after Australian wrestler Vinod Kumar Dahiya was disqualified due to a doping violation. Miller received a knee injury during training in Rio de Janeiro and withdrew before the competition started.

Key:

- VT – Victory by Fall.
- PP – Decision by Points – the loser with technical points.
- PO – Decision by Points – the loser without technical points.

Men's Greco-Roman

Athlete	Event	Qualification	Round of 16	Quarterfinal	Semifinal	Repechage 1	Repechage 2	Final / BM	
Athlete	Event	Opposition Result	Opposition Result	Opposition Result	Opposition Result	Opposition Result	Opposition Result	Opposition Result	Rank
Craig Miller	−66 kg	Withdrew due to injury							

== Media coverage ==
The New Zealand Olympic Committee (NZOC) sold exclusive New Zealand broadcasting rights to Sky Television. The games are being screened across 12 subscription based channels: Sky Sport 3 and 4, plus 10 "pop-up" channels. Sky is also showing highlights on its free-to-air channel, Prime.

Sky TV's exclusive rights caused problems with New Zealand's other media outlets. Whilst copyright law allows for "fair dealing", i.e. the reporting of short extracts, Sky TV offered contracts to media outlets that would restrict reporting to well below what the law allows. Sky TV argued that the deal offered to New Zealand media was one of the most accommodating worldwide — the terms were described by Sky TV as "the most reasonable in the world", — however, other media outlets saw it differently. On 19 July, Fairfax New Zealand (owners of Wellington's The Dominion Post and Christchurch's The Press among other newspapers, as well as the Stuff website) and New Zealand Media and Entertainment (NZME; owners of The New Zealand Herald and The Radio Network) announced that they would not send their staff to Rio to report the Olympics. After Fairfax and NZME refused to sign Sky TV's agreement, both companies were served legal papers on 29 July, alleging intended copyright breaches and threatening court injunctions unless they signed the agreement by the following Monday. In a Fairfax editorial published in its newspapers, the blame for the situation was partly put to the NZOC that gave away an exclusive contract but refused to step in when Sky TV offered deals below what was allowed by law.

Sky TV filed for an injunction against Fairfax Media using its footage, saying it was undermining its copyright. Fairfax countered Sky's argument saying the use of its footage was allowed under fair dealing provisions. On 12 August 2016, the High Court dismissed Sky's injunction bid.

== See also ==
- New Zealand at the 2016 Summer Paralympics
- New Zealand at the Olympics
