= Cycling at the 2012 Summer Olympics – Men's team sprint =

Men's team sprint cycling at the Games of the XXX Olympiad
- Venue: London Velopark
- Date: 2 August 2012
- Competitors: 30 from 10 nations
- Winning time: 42.600 WR, OR

Medalists
1st place, gold medalist(s)		Philip Hindes; Chris Hoy; Jason Kenny	Great Britain
2nd place, silver medalist(s)		Grégory Bauge; Michaël D'Almeida; Kévin Sireau	France
3rd place, bronze medalist(s)		René Enders; Maximilian Levy; Robert Förstemann	Germany

The men's cycling team sprint at the 2012 Olympic Games in London took place at the London Velopark on 2 August.

The Great Britain team, Philip Hindes, Chris Hoy and Jason Kenny, won the gold medal in world record-breaking time. Grégory Bauge, Michaël D'Almeida and Kévin Sireau from France took silver, and Germany's René Enders, Maximilian Levy and Robert Förstemann won bronze.

== Competition format ==
A men's team sprint race consists of a three-lap race between two teams of three cyclists, starting on opposite sides of the track. Each member of the team must lead for one of the laps.

The tournament consisted of an initial qualifying round. The top eight teams advanced to the first round. The first round comprised head-to-head races based on seeding (1st vs. 8th, 2nd vs. 7th, etc.). The winners of those four heats advanced to the medal round, with the two fastest winners competing in the gold medal final and the two slower winners facing off for bronze.

Great Britain's team consisting of Philip Hindes, Chris Hoy and Jason Kenny won the gold medal with a time of 42.6 seconds, breaking the world record. France won the silver medal and Germany took bronze.

== Schedule ==
All times are British Summer Time.

Date	Time	Round
Thursday, 2 August 2012	16:15	Qualifications and final

== Results ==
=== Qualification ===
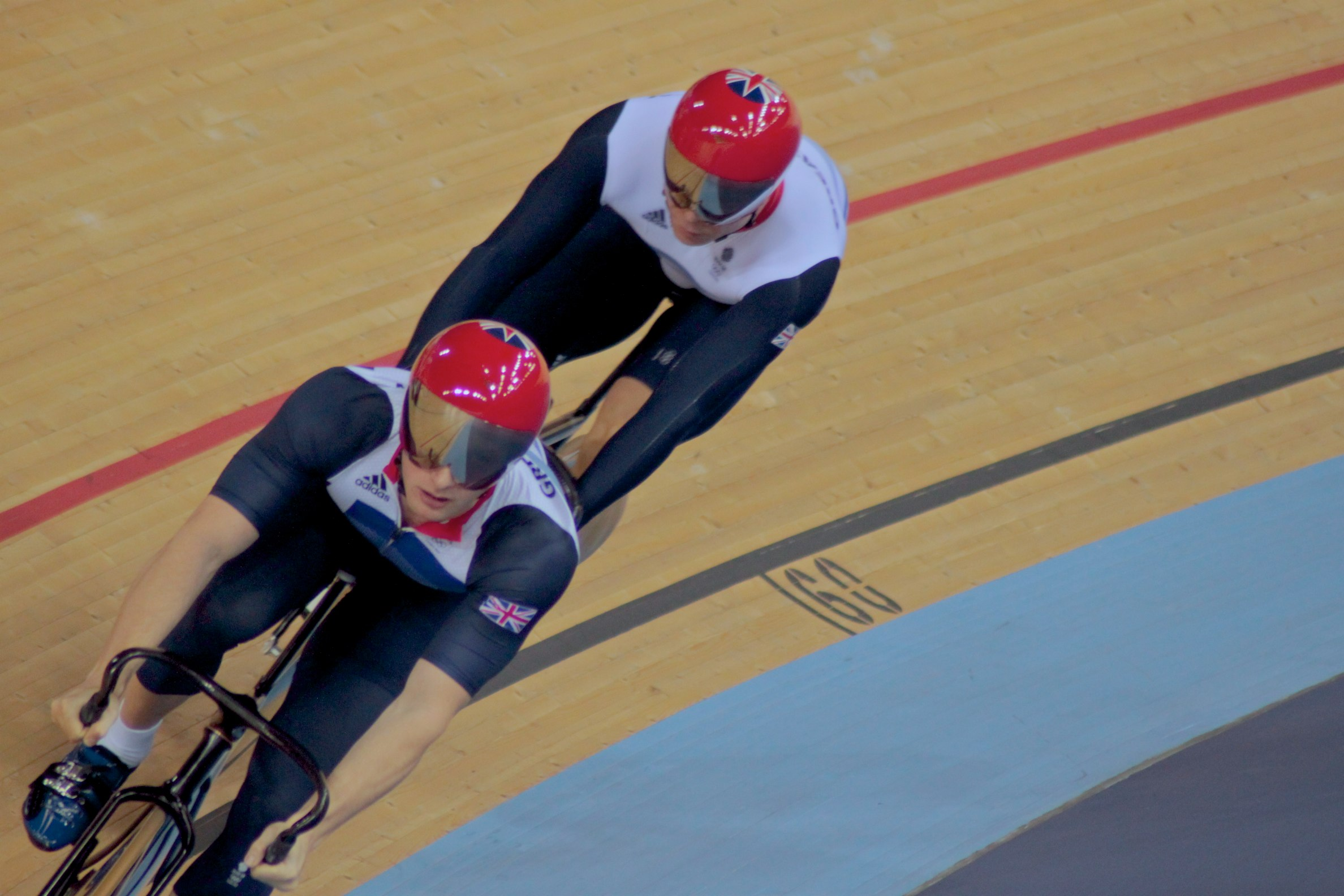
Chris Hoy and Jason Kenny

Rank	Heat	Country	Cyclists	Result	Notes
1	5	Great Britain	Philip Hindes; Chris Hoy; Jason Kenny	43.065	Q, OR
2	4	France	Grégory Baugé; Michaël D'Almeida; Kévin Sireau	43.097	Q
3	4	Australia	Matthew Glaetzer; Shane Perkins; Scott Sunderland	43.377	Q
4	3	Russia	Sergey Borisov; Denis Dmitriev; Sergey Kucherov	43.681	Q, NR
5	5	Germany	René Enders; Robert Förstemann; Maximilian Levy	43.710	Q
6	2	China	Cheng Changsong; Zhang Lei; Zhang Miao	43.751	Q
7	3	New Zealand	Eddie Dawkins; Ethan Mitchell; Simon van Velthooven	44.175	Q
8	2	Japan	Seiichiro Nakagawa; Yudai Nitta; Kazunari Watanabe	44.324	Q
9	1	Venezuela	Hersony Canelón; César Marcano; Angel Polgar	44.654	NR
10	1	Poland	Maciej Bielecki; Damian Zieliński; Kamil Kuczyński	44.712	

=== First round ===
Rank	Heat	Country	Cyclists	Result	Notes
1	4	Great Britain	Philip Hindes; Chris Hoy; Jason Kenny	42.747	Q, WR, OR
2	3	France	Grégory Baugé; Michaël D'Almeida; Kévin Sireau	42.991	Q, NR
3	1	Germany	René Enders; Robert Förstemann; Maximilian Levy	43.178	Q
4	2	Australia	Matthew Glaetzer; Shane Perkins; Scott Sunderland	43.261	Q, OC
5	3	New Zealand	Eddie Dawkins; Ethan Mitchell; Simon van Velthooven	43.495	NR
6	2	China	Cheng Changsong; Zhang Lei; Zhang Miao	43.505	AS
7	1	Russia	Sergey Borisov; Denis Dmitriev; Sergey Kucherov	43.909	
8	4	Japan	Seiichiro Nakagawa; Yudai Nitta; Kazunari Watanabe	43.964	NR

=== Finals ===
==== Bronze medal final ====
Rank	Country	Cyclists	Result	Notes
3rd place, bronze medalist(s)	Germany	René Enders; Robert Förstemann; Maximilian Levy	43.209	
4	Australia	Matthew Glaetzer; Shane Perkins; Scott Sunderland	43.355	

==== Gold medal final ====
Rank	Country	Cyclists	Result	Notes
1st place, gold medalist(s)	Great Britain	Philip Hindes; Chris Hoy; Jason Kenny	42.600	WR, OR
2nd place, silver medalist(s)	France	Grégory Baugé; Michaël D'Almeida; Kévin Sireau	43.013	
