= Olympic record progression track cycling – Men's team sprint =

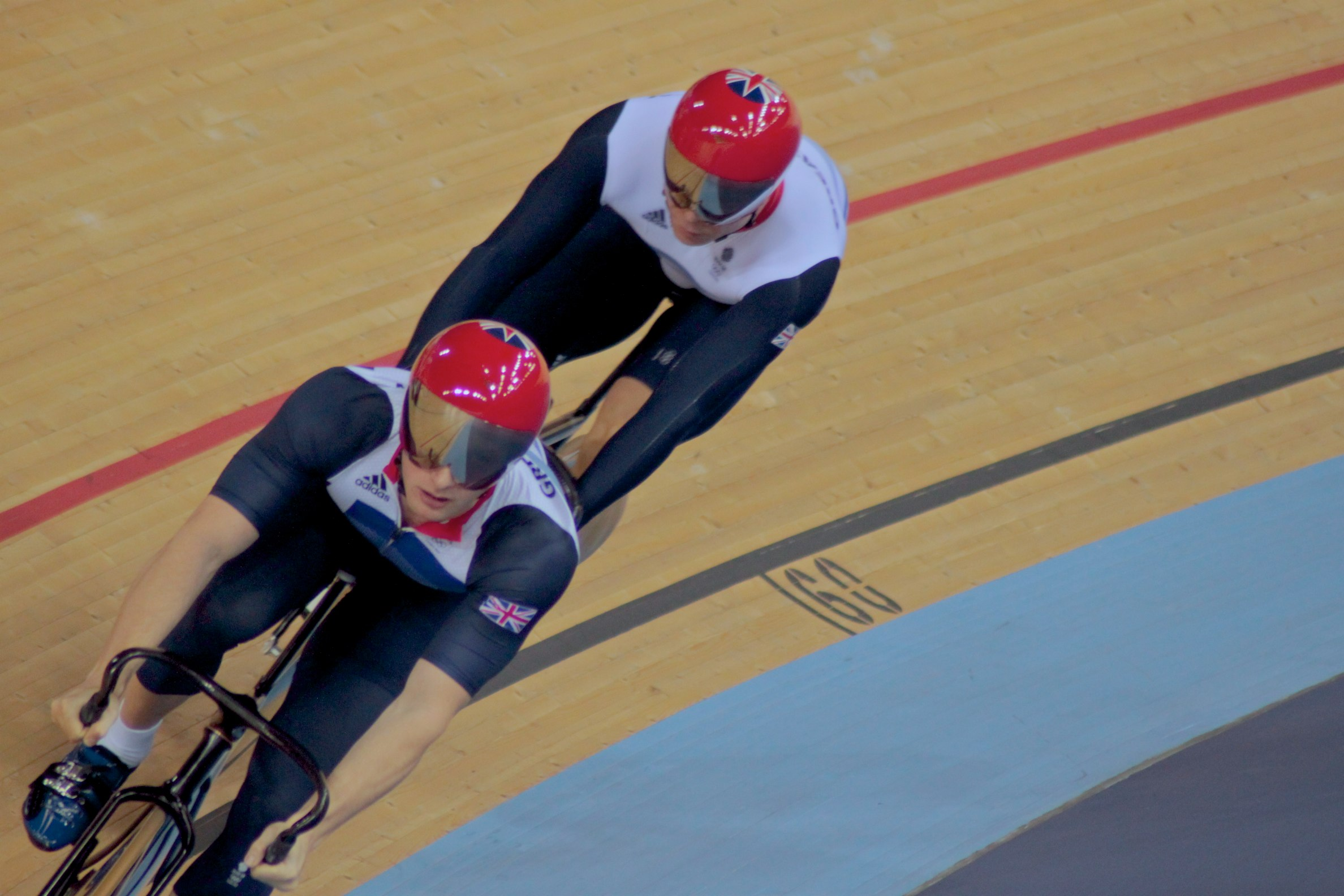
The British team during the 2012 Summer Olympics setting the Olympic record

This is an overview of the progression of the Olympic track cycling record of the men's team sprint as recognised by the Union Cycliste Internationale (UCI).

The men's team sprint was introduced at the 2012 Summer Olympics.

== Progression ==
♦ denotes a performance that is also a current world record. Statistics are correct as of the end of the 2024 Summer Olympics.

During the Qualification session there were several teams who rode a new best time and so had temporary the Olympic Record. They are not listed as Olympic Record holders because they did not win the qualification session. These countries who had temporary the Olympic record are:

- Heat 1: Venezuela: Hersony Canelón, César Marcano, Angel Polgar in a time of 44.654
- Heat 2: China: Cheng Changsong, Zhang Lei, Zhang Miao in a time of 43.751
- Heat 3: Russia: Sergey Borisov, Denis Dmitriev, Sergey Kucherov in a time of 43.681
- Heat 4: France: Grégory Baugé, Michaël D'Almeida, Kévin Sireau in a time of 43.097

Time	Cyclists	Location	Track	Date	Meet	Ref
43.065	Great Britain; Philip Hindes; Jason Kenny; Chris Hoy	London (United Kingdom) - London Velopark	Indoor track	2 August 2012	2012 Summer Olympics; Qualification	
42.747	Great Britain; Philip Hindes; Jason Kenny; Chris Hoy	London (United Kingdom) - London Velopark	Indoor track	2 August 2012	2012 Summer Olympics; First round	
42.600	Great Britain; Philip Hindes; Jason Kenny; Chris Hoy	London (United Kingdom) - London Velopark	Indoor track	2 August 2012	2012 Summer Olympics; Gold medal final	
42.562	Great Britain; Philip Hindes; Jason Kenny; Callum Skinner	Rio de Janeiro (Brazil) - Rio Olympic Velodrome	Indoor track	11 August 2016	2016 Summer Olympics; Qualifying	
42.535	New Zealand; Eddie Dawkins; Ethan Mitchell; Sam Webster	Rio de Janeiro (Brazil) - Rio Olympic Velodrome	Indoor track	11 August 2016	2016 Summer Olympics; First round	
42.440	Great Britain; Philip Hindes; Jason Kenny; Callum Skinner	Rio de Janeiro (Brazil) - Rio Olympic Velodrome	Indoor track	11 August 2016	2016 Summer Olympics; Gold medal final	
42.134	Netherlands; Roy van den Berg; Harrie Lavreysen; Matthijs Büchli	Izu (Japan) - Izu Velodrome	Indoor track	3 August 2021	2020 Summer Olympics; Qualifying	
41.431	Netherlands; Jeffrey Hoogland; Harrie Lavreysen; Roy van den Berg	Izu (Japan) - Izu Velodrome	Indoor track	3 August 2021	2020 Summer Olympics; First round	
41.369	Netherlands; Jeffrey Hoogland; Harrie Lavreysen; Roy van den Berg	Izu (Japan) - Izu Velodrome	Indoor track	3 August 2021	2020 Summer Olympics; Finals	
41.279	Netherlands; Roy van den Berg; Harrie Lavreysen; Jeffrey Hoogland	Saint-Quentin-en-Yvelines, France	Indoor track	5 August 2024	2024 Summer Olympics; Qualifying	
41.191	Netherlands; Roy van den Berg; Harrie Lavreysen; Jeffrey Hoogland	Saint-Quentin-en-Yvelines, France	Indoor track	6 August 2024	2024 Summer Olympics; First round	
♦ 40.949	Netherlands; Jeffrey Hoogland; Harrie Lavreysen; Roy van den Berg	Saint-Quentin-en-Yvelines, France	Indoor track	6 August 2024	2024 Summer Olympics; Finals	
