= Luke McAlister =

NZ & Maori international rugby union player

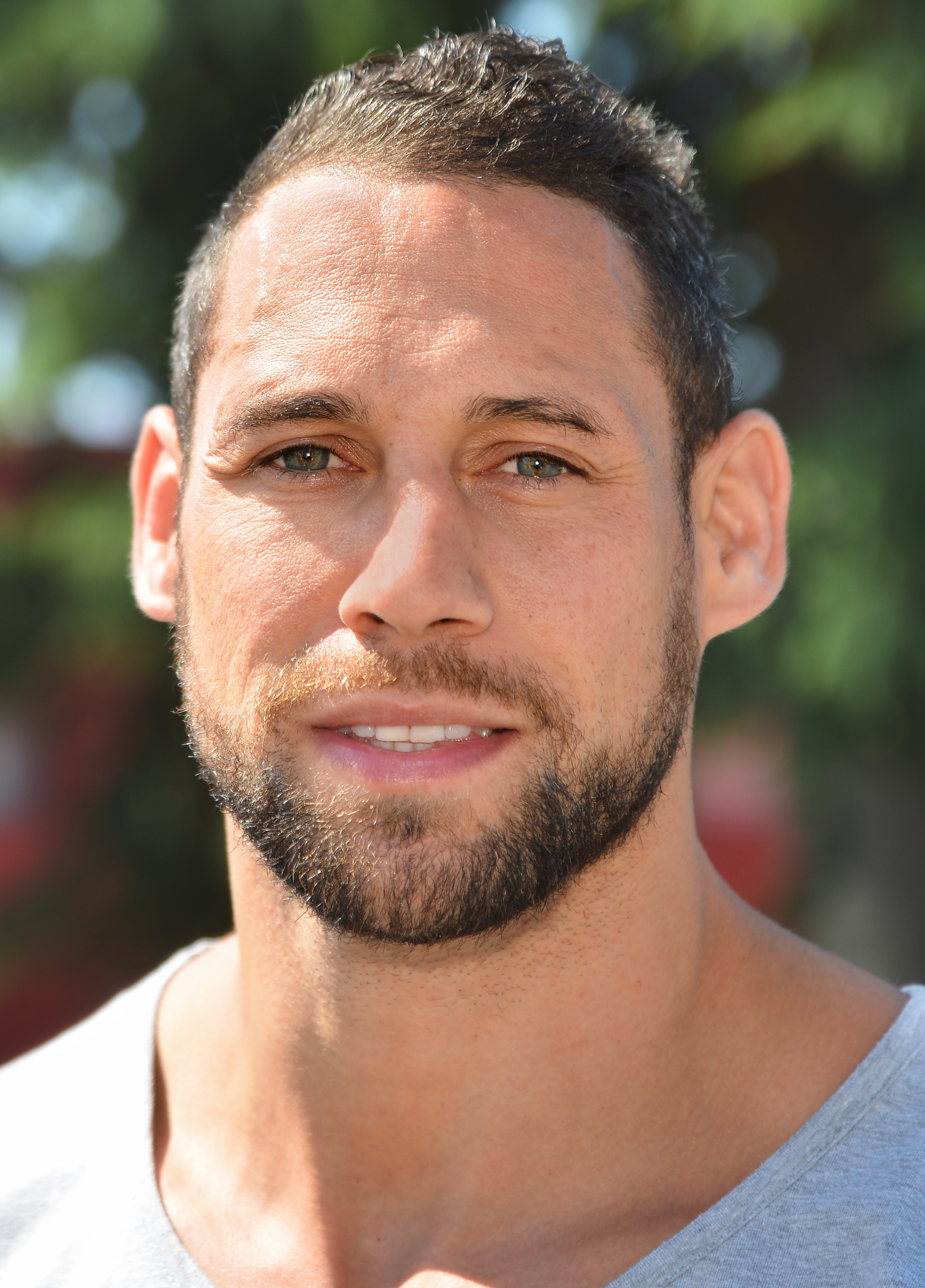
- McAlister in 2016
- Born: Charles Luke McAlister; 28 August 1983 (age 43) Waitara, Taranaki, New Zealand
- Height: 1.77 m (5 ft 10 in)
- Weight: 93 kg (14 st 9 lb)
- School: Westlake Boys High School
- Notable relative: Charlie McAlister (father)

Rugby union career
- Position(s): Fly-half, Centre, Fullback
Amateur team(s)
Years	Team	Apps	(Points)
- Silverdale United R.F.C
Senior career
Years	Team	Apps	(Points)
2002–2011	North Harbour	52	(461)
2004–2011	Blues	51	(389)
2007–2009	Sale Sharks	36	(204)
2011–2017	Toulouse	143	(806)
2017–2018	Toulon	4	(6)
2018	Clermont	9	(18)
2019	Shimizu Blue Sharks	4	(7)
- Correct as of 22 February 2021
International career
Years	Team	Apps	(Points)
2002–2004	New Zealand Colts	8	(67)
2005–2009	New Zealand	31	(153)
2005	Junior All Blacks	3	(17)
2005–2010	New Zealand Māori	5	(38)
- Correct as of 1 July 2018

Charles Luke McAlister (born 28 August 1983 in Waitara) is a retired New Zealand rugby union footballer. He played at fly-half and at centre. He is the brother of New Zealand women's sevens player Kayla McAlister and son of rugby league footballer Charlie McAlister.

== Career ==
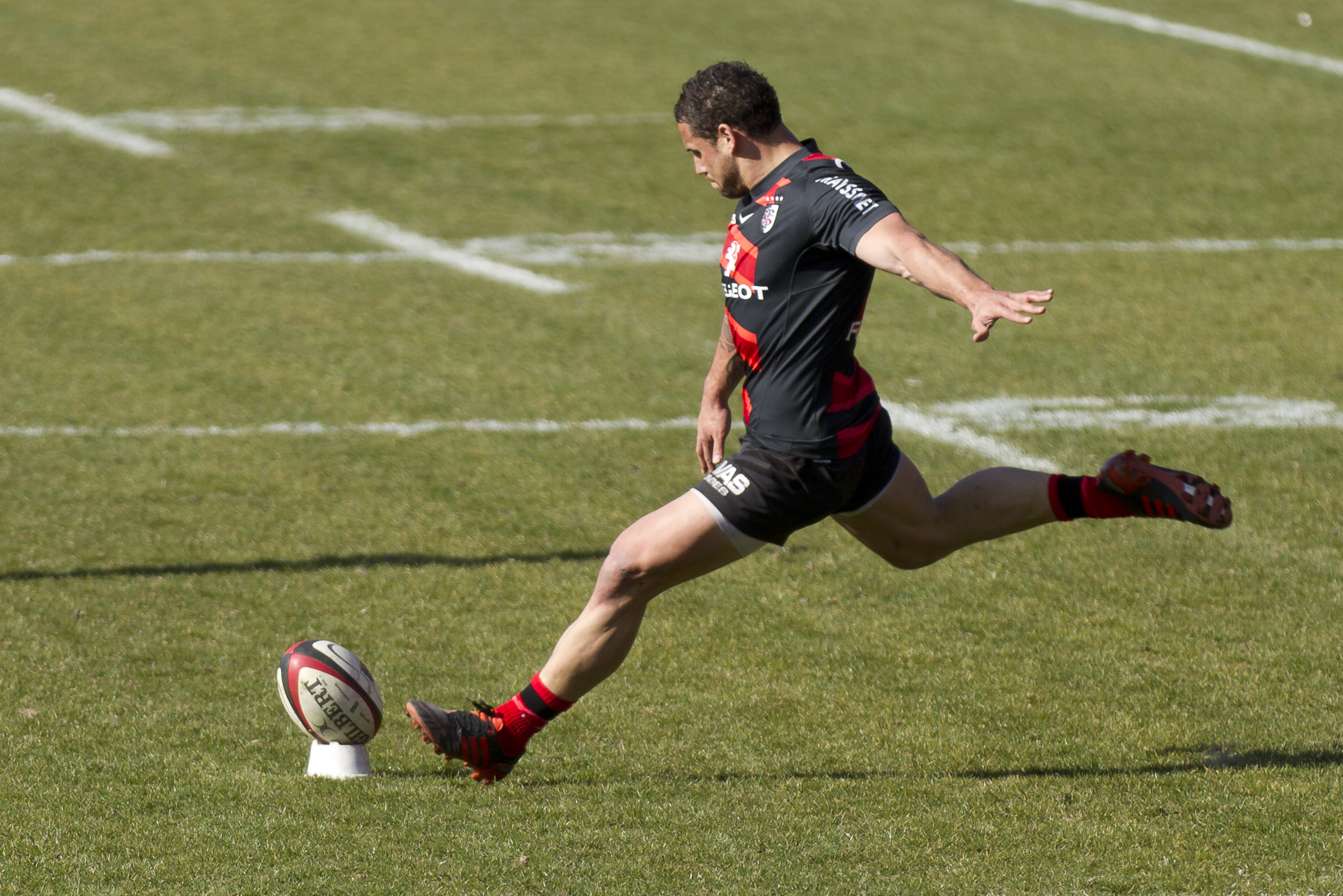
McAlister kicking a conversion for Toulouse against Castres on 10 March 2012

McAlister was born in Waitara, New Zealand, and attended Westlake Boys High School, where he played first five-eighth. He played for Silverdale in the North Harbour premier competition before making his provincial debut for North Harbour in 2002 and Super Rugby debut for the Blues in 2004. He made his international debut for New Zealand aged 21, versus the British and Irish Lions in 2005.

In June 2006, his father, Charlie, resigned his position as head coach of the Manawatu team in the Air New Zealand Cup. Charlie McAlister is a former rugby league footballer, and Luke McAlister lived in the Manchester area from the age of four to 13 while his father played rugby league for Oldham, Castleford and the Sheffield Eagles, during which time Luke was a member of the Manchester United Academy.

Following the announcement of his inclusion in the All Blacks squad for the 2007 Rugby World Cup, it was announced on 23 July 2007 that McAlister would be joining Guinness Premiership side Sale Sharks after the World Cup on a two-year deal. It was also reported that he had turned down offers from both Munster and Toulouse to join Sale.

McAlister played in four of the All Blacks' five matches at the 2007 Rugby World Cup, including the 20–18 quarter-final loss to France, in which he was controversially sent to the sin bin for an obstruction. France converted the resulting penalty, and the sin-binning was cited by many New Zealand fans as one of the reasons why their team lost the match. Over the course of the tournament, McAlister accumulated a total of 17 points.

In 2009 after two seasons with Sale in the Guinness Premiership, McAlister returned to New Zealand, where he re-signed with North Harbour and the Blues, with the intention of regaining his place in the national side. He appeared for the All Blacks as a substitute for Stephen Donald against France in Wellington on 20 June 2009.

From August 2011, McAlister played for Stade Toulousain in France's Top 14 championship. On his first season with Toulouse, he won the Bouclier de Brennus. He played a crucial role in it, scoring all of his team's points during the final.

On 12 May 2017, McAlister left Toulouse to sign for former Top 14 champions Toulon ahead of the 2017–18 season.

== Post-playing Career ==
Since retiring, McAlister returned to Westlake Boys High School as a teacher and coach.
