= Marty McDowell =

New Zealander canoeist

Marty McDowell (born 16 January 1987) is a New Zealand canoeist.

He is representing New Zealand at the 2016 Summer Olympics, in the K1 1000 event.
