= Graham Oberlin-Brown =

New Zealand rower

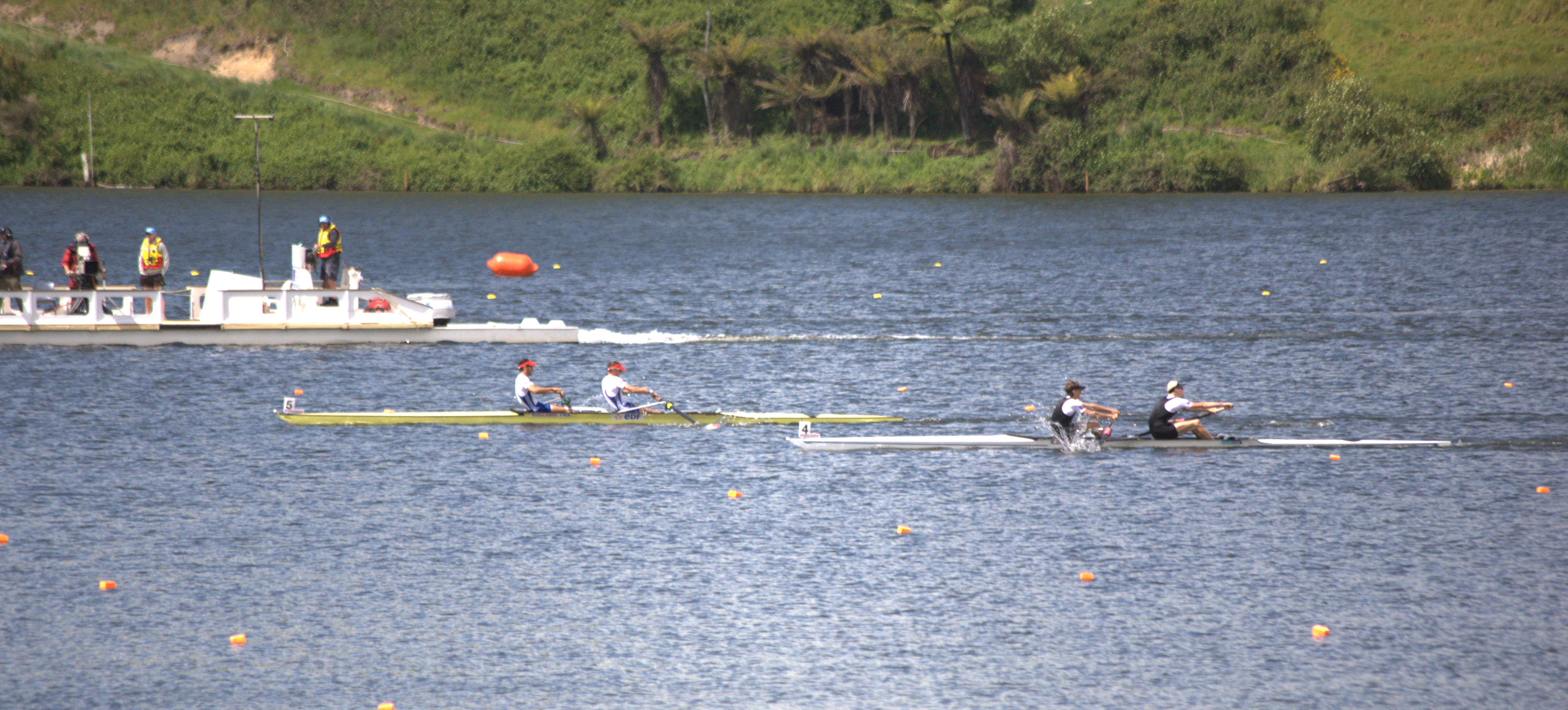
- Oberlin-Brown and Lassche on their way to silver in 2010

Personal information
- Born: 8 February 1988 (age 38)

Sport
- Sport: Rowing
Medal record
Men's rowing
Representing New Zealand
World Championships
Silver medal – second place	2010 Lake Karapiro	LM2−
World Under 23 Championships
Gold medal – first place	2006 Lake Hazewinkel	LM2x
Gold medal – first place	2008 Brandenburg	LM1x

Graham Oberlin-Brown (born 8 February 1988) is a New Zealand rower. In 2006 (aged 18) along with Peter Taylor he became the Under 23 World Champion in the men's lightweight double sculls, and in doing so set a new world under 23 best time. In 2008 Oberlin-Brown won his second Under 23 World Championship in the men's lightweight single (aged 20). At the 2010 World Rowing Championships, he won a silver medal in the lightweight men's pair partnering with James Lassche. Oberlin-Brown represented New Zealand in rowing from 2006 to 2012.

Oberlin-Brown was a finalist twice (2006, 2008) in the Emerging Talent category of the Halberg Awards recognising New Zealand's top sporting achievements.

In 2015, Oberlin-Brown graduated from the University of Waikato with a Bachelor of Management Studies (BMS), majoring in Strategic Management and International Business.

Whilst completing his studies Oberlin-Brown led the St Paul’s Collegiate School rowing programme as Head Coach, including winning the prestigious Springbok Shield Under 18 Boys Four race at the 2015 Maadi Cup regatta.
