= Cycling at the 2016 Summer Olympics – Men's team sprint =

Men's team sprint cycling at the Games of the XXXI Olympiad
- Venue: Rio Olympic Velodrome
- Date: 11 August 2016
- Competitors: 27 from 9 nations
- Winning time: 42.440 OR

Medalists
1st place, gold medalist(s)		Philip Hindes; Jason Kenny; Callum Skinner	Great Britain
2nd place, silver medalist(s)		Eddie Dawkins; Ethan Mitchell; Sam Webster	New Zealand
3rd place, bronze medalist(s)		Grégory Baugé; Michaël D'Almeida; François Pervis	France

The men's cycling team sprint at the 2016 Olympic Games in Rio de Janeiro took place on 11 August 2016.

The medals were presented by Camiel Eurlings, IOC member, Netherlands and José Manuel Pelaez, Member of the UCI Management Committee.

== Competition format ==
A men's team sprint race consists of a three-lap race between two teams of three cyclists, starting on opposite sides of the track. Each member of the team must lead for one of the laps.

The tournament consisted of an initial qualifying round. The top eight teams advanced to the first round. The first round comprised head-to-head races based on seeding (1st vs. 8th, 2nd vs. 7th, etc.). The winners of those four heats advanced to the medal round, with the two fastest winners competing in the gold medal final and the two slower winners facing off for bronze.

== Schedule ==
All times are Brasília Time (UTC−03:00)

Date	Time	Round
Thursday, 11 August 2016	16:00	Qualifications and final

== Results ==
=== Qualification ===
The fastest 8 teams qualify for the first round.

Rank	Country	Cyclists	Result	Notes
1	Great Britain	Philip Hindes; Jason Kenny; Callum Skinner	42.562	Q, OR
2	New Zealand	Eddie Dawkins; Ethan Mitchell; Sam Webster	42.673	Q
3	Australia	Patrick Constable; Matthew Glaetzer; Nathan Hart	43.158	Q
4	France	Grégory Baugé; Michaël D'Almeida; François Pervis	43.185	Q
5	Poland	Rafal Sarnecki; Damian Zieliński; Krzysztof Maksel	43.297	Q
6	Netherlands	Jeffrey Hoogland; Theo Bos; Matthijs Büchli	43.688	Q
7	Germany	René Enders; Joachim Eilers; Maximilian Levy	43.711	Q
8	Venezuela	César Marcano; Hersony Canelón; Ángel Pulgar	44.263	Q
9	South Korea	Son Je-yong; Im Chae-bin; Kang Dong-jin	REL^{[A]} ~~44.422~~	

- ^{^{A}} South Korea were relegated for breaching article 3.2.153
- Q = qualified

=== First round ===
First round heats are held as follows:
Heat 1: 4th v 5th qualifier
Heat 2: 3rd v 6th qualifier
Heat 3: 2nd v 7th qualifier
Heat 4: 1st v 8th qualifier

The heat winners are ranked on time, from which the top 2 proceed to the gold medal final and the other 2 proceed to the bronze medal final.

Rank	Heat	Country	Cyclists	Result	Notes
1	3	New Zealand	Eddie Dawkins; Ethan Mitchell; Sam Webster	42.535	QG, OR
2	4	Great Britain	Philip Hindes; Jason Kenny; Callum Skinner	42.640	QG
3	1	France	Grégory Baugé; Michaël D'Almeida; François Pervis	43.153	QB
4	2	Australia	Patrick Constable; Matthew Glaetzer; Nathan Hart	43.166	QB
5	3	Germany	René Enders; Joachim Eilers; Maximilian Levy	43.455	
6	2	Netherlands	Nils van 't Hoenderdaal; Jeffrey Hoogland; Theo Bos	43.552	
7	1	Poland	Rafal Sarnecki; Damian Zieliński; Krzysztof Maksel	43.555	
8	4	Venezuela	César Marcano; Hersony Canelón; Ángel Pulgar	44.486	

- QG = qualified for gold medal final
- QB = qualified for bronze medal final

=== Finals ===
The final classification is determined in the medal finals.

Rank	Country	Cyclists	Result	Notes
Bronze medal final
3rd place, bronze medalist(s)	France	Grégory Baugé; Michaël D'Almeida; François Pervis	43.143	
4	Australia	Patrick Constable; Matthew Glaetzer; Nathan Hart	43.298	
Gold medal final
1st place, gold medalist(s)	Great Britain	Philip Hindes; Jason Kenny; Callum Skinner	42.440	OR
2nd place, silver medalist(s)	New Zealand	Eddie Dawkins; Ethan Mitchell; Sam Webster	42.542	
