= Curtis Rapley =

New Zealand rower (born 1990)

Medal record

Men's rowing

Representing New Zealand

World Championships
Silver medal – second place	2013 Chungju	LM4−
Silver medal – second place	2014 Amsterdam	LM4−

Curtis Rapley (born 5 December 1990) is a New Zealand rower.

At the 2013 World Rowing Championships held at Tangeum Lake, Chungju in South Korea, he won a silver medal in the lightweight men's four with James Hunter, James Lassche, and Peter Taylor. At the 2014 World Rowing Championships held at Bosbaan, Amsterdam, he won a silver medal in the lightweight men's four with James Hunter, Alistair Bond, and Peter Taylor.
