= Charlie McAlister =

Scotland international rugby league footballer

Personal information
- Full name: Charlie McAlister
- Born: 17 March 1963 (age 63) New Zealand

Playing information

Rugby union
Club
Years	Team	Pld	T	G	FG	P
1988	Bradford & Bingley RFC	0	0	0	0	0

Rugby league
- Position: Fullback, Wing, Centre, Loose forward
Club
Years	Team	Pld	T	G	FG	P
1988	Newcastle Knights	1	0	0	0	0
1988–92	Oldham RLFC	114	31	63	0	250
1992	Sheffield Eagles	8	10	0	0	40
1993	Oldham RLFC	15	2	0	0	8
	Total	138	43	63	0	298
Representative
Years	Team	Pld	T	G	FG	P
1989	Wellington	1	0	0	0	0
1990	Taranaki	1	0	0	0	0
1995	Scotland	3	0	4	0	8
- Source: As of 14 Jul 2021

Charlie McAlister is a former Scotland international rugby league footballer who played as a professional in England and Australia.

== Playing career ==
McAlister played for the Newcastle Knights in 1988. He then moved to England and played rugby union for Bradford and Bingley Rugby Club before signing with Oldham, and returning to rugby league. He played for Oldham between 1988/89 and 1991/92, becoming the club's vice captain. McAlister earned a Kiwi trial in 1989. McAlister then spent the 1992/93 season with the Sheffield Eagles before returning to Oldham for the 1993/94 season.

McAlister also played for the Castleford Tigers, and was later the coach of the Manawatu Rugby Union team. In 1995 he played for Scotland at the Emerging Nations Tournament.

He is also father of All Black and Blues player Luke McAlister, and northern mystics player Kayla McAlister. He currently acts as Luke's manager.

Charlie McAlister also was a Taranaki Rugby Football Union Representative playing 78 games, as well as playing for the Maori All Blacks
