= Alistair Bond =

New Zealand rower

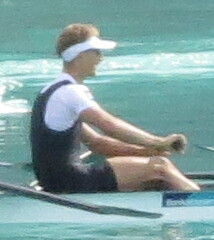

Personal information
- Born: 16 August 1989 (age 36)
- Relative: Hamish Bond (brother)

Sport
- Country: New Zealand
- Sport: Rowing
Medal record
Men's rowing
Representing New Zealand
World Championships
Silver medal – second place	2014 Amsterdam	LM4−

Alistair Bond (born 16 August 1989) is a New Zealand rower.

Bond is the younger brother of Hamish Bond. He has completed a Bachelor of Surveying degree from the University of Otago and gained his Masters of Environmental Management at Massey University.

At the 2014 World Rowing Championships held at Bosbaan, Amsterdam, he won a silver medal in the lightweight men's four with James Hunter, Peter Taylor, and Curtis Rapley.
