= James Lassche =

New Zealand rower

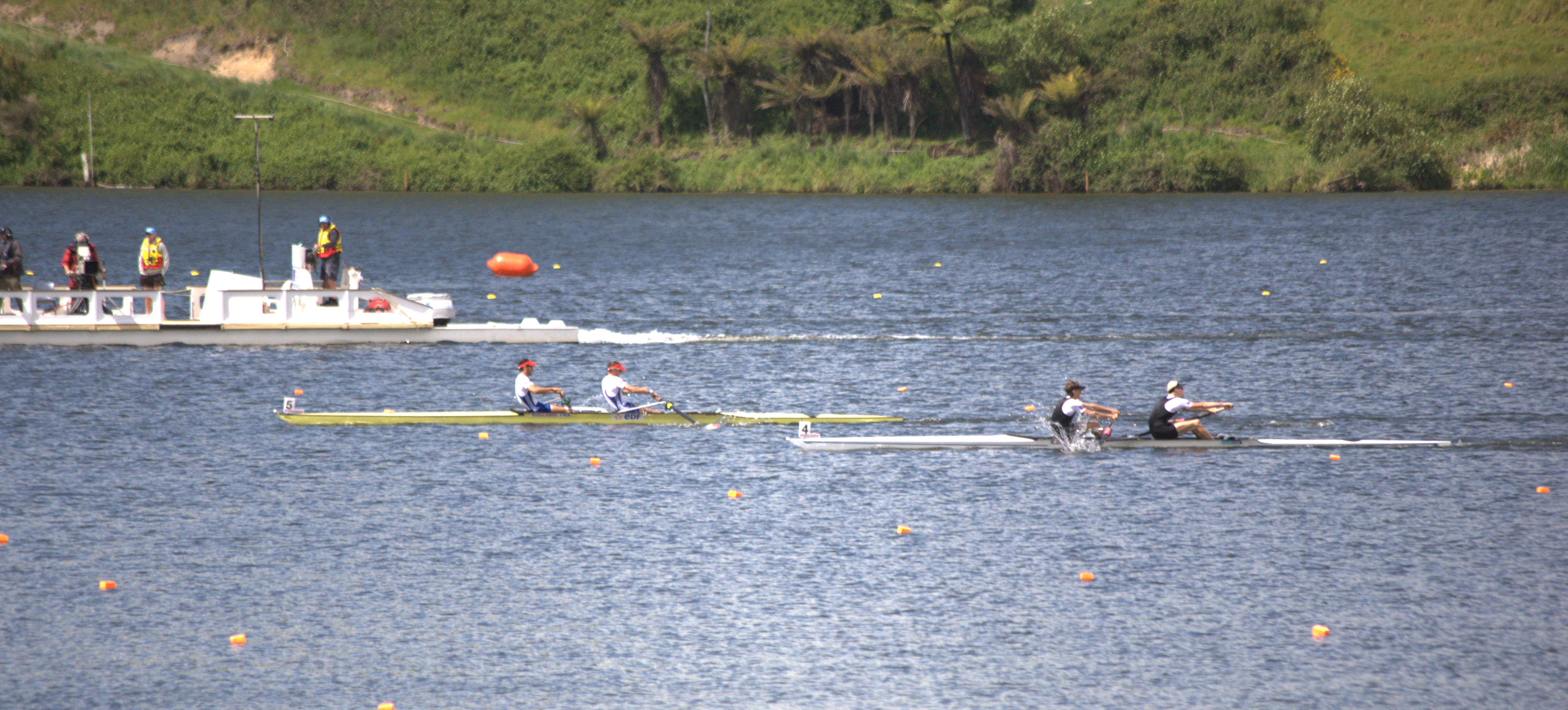
- Oberlin-Brown and Lassche on their way to silver in 2010

Personal information
- Born: 31 August 1989 (age 36)
- Height: 191 cm (6 ft 3 in)
- Weight: 72 kg (159 lb)

Sport
- Sport: Rowing
Medal record
Men's rowing
Representing New Zealand
World Championships
Silver medal – second place	2010 Lake Karapiro	LM2−
Silver medal – second place	2013 Chungju	LM4−

James Lassche (born 31 August 1989) is a former New Zealand rower.

At the 2010 World Rowing Championships, he won a silver medal in the lightweight men's pair partnering with Graham Oberlin-Brown. At the 2013 World Rowing Championships held at Tangeum Lake, Chungju in South Korea, he won a silver medal in the lightweight men's four with James Hunter, Curtis Rapley, and Peter Taylor.
