= Peter Taylor (rower) =

New Zealand rower (born 1984)

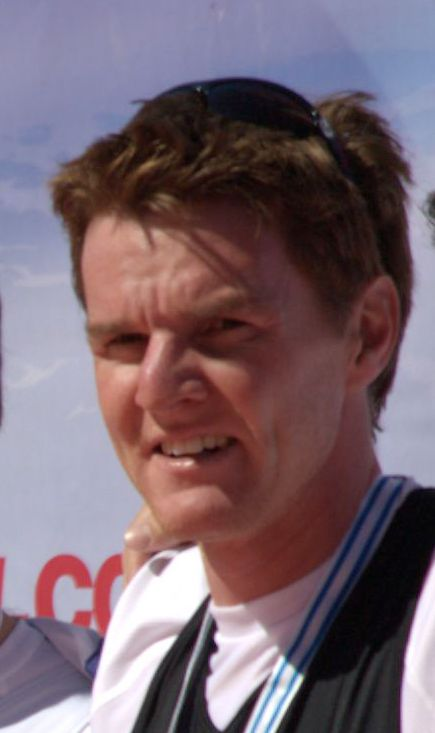
- Peter Taylor in 2010

Personal information
- Born: 3 January 1984 (age 42) Lower Hutt
- Height: 189 cm (6 ft 2 in)
- Weight: 74 kg (163 lb)
Medal record
Men's rowing
Representing New Zealand
Olympic Games
Bronze medal – third place	2012 London	Lightweight double sculls
World Championships
Gold medal – first place	2009 Poznan	Lightweight double sculls
Silver medal – second place	2011 Bled	Lightweight double sculls
Silver medal – second place	2013 Chungju	LM4−
Silver medal – second place	2014 Amsterdam	LM4−
Bronze medal – third place	2010 Karapiro	Lightweight double sculls
U23 World Championships
Gold medal – first place	2006 Hazewinkel	Lightweight double sculls

Peter Taylor (born 3 January 1984) is a former New Zealand rower. He became world champion in 2009 in men's lightweight double scull.

== Rowing career ==
In 2006 along with Graham Oberlin-Brown he became the Under 23 World Champion in the men's lightweight double sculls, and in doing so set a new world under 23 best time.

Partnering Storm Uru he finished 7th in the men's lightweight double sculls at the 2008 Summer Olympics.

At the 2009 World Rowing Championships in Poznan, Poland, Taylor and Uru became World Champions in men's lightweight double scull.

In February 2011, Taylor caused an upset win when he became New Zealand national champion in the lightweight men's single sculls at Lake Ruataniwha, beating triple world champion Duncan Grant.

Taylor and Uru bettered their 2008 Summer Olympic result at the 2012 Summer Olympics, winning the bronze medal in the same event.

At the 2013 World Rowing Championships held at Tangeum Lake, Chungju in South Korea, he won a silver medal in the lightweight men's four with James Hunter, Curtis Rapley, and James Lassche. At the 2014 World Rowing Championships held at Bosbaan, Amsterdam, he won a silver medal in the lightweight men's four with James Hunter, Alistair Bond, and Curtis Rapley.

In 2016, Taylor competed in the lightweight men's four with James Hunter, Alistair Bond and James Lassche at the 2016 Summer Olympics and placed 5th. Taylor retired from rowing after competing at the 2016 Summer Olympics.
