= List of Venezuelan records in track cycling =

The following are the national records in track cycling in Venezuela maintained by the Venezuelan Cycling Federation (Federacion Venezolana De Ciclismo).

== Men ==
Event	Record	Athlete	Date	Meet	Place	Ref
Flying 200 m time trial	9.473	Hersony Canelón	6 September 2019	Pan American Championships	Cochabamba, Bolivia	
250 m time trial (standing start)	17.351	César Marcano	5 December 2013	World Cup	Aguascalientes, Mexico	
1 km time trial	1:00.083	Ángel Polgar	7 December 2013	World Cup	Aguascalientes, Mexico	
Team sprint	43.011	Hersony Canelón; César Marcano; Ángel Pulgar	5 December 2013	World Cup	Aguascalientes, Mexico	
4000m individual pursuit	4:20.241	Clever Martinez	6 September 2019	Pan American Championships	Cochabamba, Bolivia	
4000m team pursuit	4:04.461	Clever Martínez; Ángel Pulgar; Carlos Linares; Luis Mendoza	1 June 2018	South American Games	Cochabamba, Bolivia	

== Women ==
Event	Record	Athlete	Date	Meet	Place	Ref
Flying 200 m time trial	10.905	Daniela Larreal	8 September 2001	Bolivarian Games	Quito, Ecuador	
250 m time trial (standing start)	19.632	Michell Manzi	20 September 2026	South American Games	Rafaela, Argentina	
500 m time trial	34.385	Mariaesthela Vilera	6 February 2013	Pan American Championships	Mexico City, Mexico	
1 km time trial	1:09.704	Michell Manzi	21 February 2026	Pan American Championships	Santiago, Chile	
Team sprint (500m)	33.611	Daniela Larreal; Mariaesthela Vilera	17 October 2011	Pan American Games	Guadalajara, Mexico	
Team sprint (750m)	49.254	Michell Manzi; Carliany Martínez; Olviangel Castillo	20 September 2026	South American Games	Rafaela, Argentina	
3000m individual pursuit	3:38.439	Angie González	19 January 2013	World Cup	Aguascalientes, Mexico	
3000m team pursuit	3:25.796	Jennifer Cesar; Angie González; Daniely García	7 February 2013	Pan American Championships	Mexico City, Mexico	
4000m team pursuit	4:29.993	Verónica Abreu; Fabiana Candelas; María Daza; Shantal Zambrano	20 September 2026	South American Games	Rafaela, Argentina	
