= Julie Brougham =

New Zealand equestrian (1954–2021)

Personal information
- Born: Julie Claire D'Ath; 20 May 1954 Palmerston North, New Zealand
- Died: 9 December 2021 (aged 67) Karere, New Zealand

Sport
- Country: New Zealand
- Sport: Equestrian
- Event: Dressage

Achievements and titles
- World finals: 2018 World Equestrian Games

Julie Claire Brougham (née D'Ath; 20 May 1954 – 9 December 2021) was a New Zealand equestrian, competing in dressage. She became New Zealand's oldest Olympic competitor when she competed at the 2016 Summer Olympics in Rio de Janeiro at age 62.

== Biography ==
=== Early life and major competitions ===
Brougham was born in 1954 in Palmerston North. She began riding horses at age four. Later on, Brougham rode a horse named Vom Feinsten, also called Steiny, who she first met in 2008. Vom Feinsten is a German-bred chestnut horse.

Brougham competed in the individual dressage at the 2016 Summer Olympics in Rio de Janeiro, becoming New Zealand's oldest Olympic competitor at age 62. She was the third-ever New Zealander to compete in dressage at the Olympics. Her score of 68.543 was the best result for any New Zealander at an Olympic grand prix, but was not enough to advance to the next round of competition and she finished 44th.

Athlete	Horse	Event	Grand Prix		Grand Prix Special		Grand Prix Freestyle		Overall	
Athlete	Horse	Event	Score	Rank	Score	Rank	Technical	Artistic	Score	Rank
Julie Brougham	Vom Feinsten	Individual	68.543	44	did not advance					

In 2017, Brougham won the grand prix special at the Australian National Championships. In 2018, Brougham won New Zealand's National Dressage Championship, after years of close places. Also in 2018, she competed in the World Equestrian Games, coming 36th. At the time, she was New Zealand's top dressage rider, and also held the Australasian record for grand prix musical freestyle. This was despite a horseriding injury in early 2018, which required a hip replacement.

=== Cancer ===
Brougham was diagnosed with abdominal cancer in October 2018. She was hospitalised with complications after the first round of chemotherapy, and had surgeries to remove her ovaries and fallopian tubes and part of her large bowel. She also had a stoma and collection bag put in, which were permanent. Brougham returned to competition equestrian in September 2019 at the Dressage Central Districts championship show in Palmerston North, and won the event.

Brougham said in 2018 that the Tokyo 2020 Olympics was not a target, as she would not put Steiny, who was aged 15 in 2018, through another intense Olympic campaign. After her illness, competing at those Olympics was expected to be out of the question.

=== Personal life ===
Brougham was married to David, who is an orthopedic surgeon. They have two adult children. She lived in Karere in the Manawatū District at her farm, Karere Bells, just south of Palmerston North.

Brougham died from cancer at her home on 9 December 2021, at the age of 67.
