= Philip Hindes =

British cyclist

Philip Hindes MBE
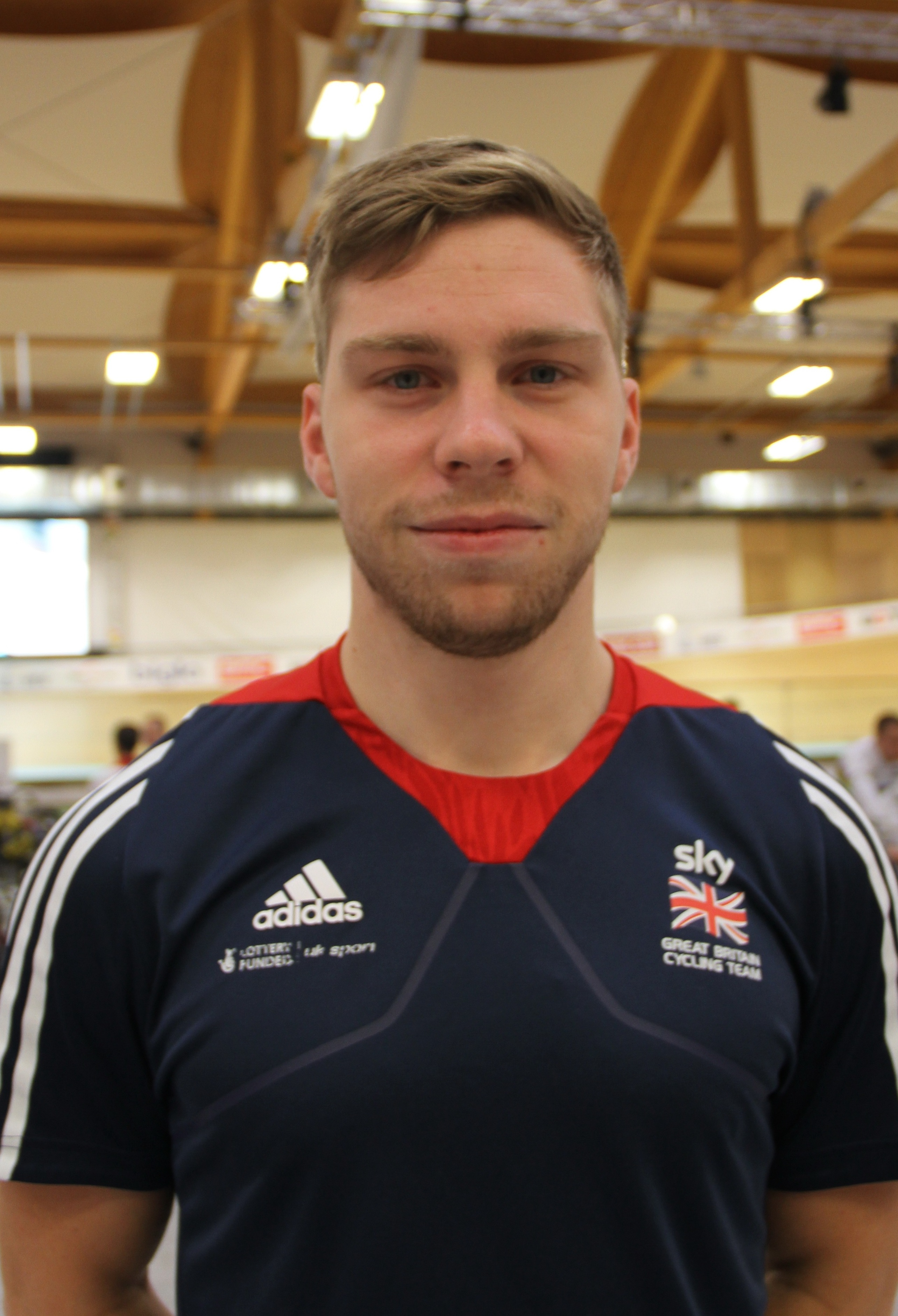
- Hindes at the 2015 UEC European Track Championships

Personal information
- Born: 22 September 1992 (age 34) Krefeld, North Rhine-Westphalia, Germany
- Height: 1.78 m (5 ft 10 in)
- Weight: 83 kg (183 lb)

Cycling career
- Sport: Cycling
- Discipline: Track
- Role: Rider
- Rider type: Sprinter

Professional team
- 2016–: WIGGINS
Medal record
Men's track cycling
Event	1st	2nd	3rd
Olympic Games	2	0	0
Commonwealth Games	0	2	0
Total	2	2	0
Representing Great Britain
Olympic Games
Gold medal – first place	2012 London	Team sprint
Gold medal – first place	2016 Rio de Janeiro	Team sprint
World Championships
Silver medal – second place	2018 Apeldoorn	Team sprint
Representing England
Commonwealth Games
Silver medal – second place	2014 Glasgow	Team sprint
Silver medal – second place	2018 Gold Coast	Team sprint

Philip Hindes MBE (born 22 September 1992) is a British former track cyclist, specialising in sprints. He holds dual nationality, having been born in Germany to a British father. Having initially competed for Germany at a junior level, in 2010 he switched to the British Cycling programme. At the 2012 Summer Olympics he won the gold medal in the Men's team sprint, and again at the 2016 Summer Olympics he won the gold medal in the Men's team sprint.

== Early life ==
Hindes was born in Krefeld, Germany. His father served with the British Army in Germany where he met Hindes' German mother. He attended Heinrich Heine Gymnasium, a specialist sports school in Kaiserslautern, where he was coached by Frank Zeigler. Hindes represented his region, North Rhine-Westphalia in rowing, following his brother into the sport.

== Career ==
Hindes began cycling in 2008 at the age of 15 in road racing events but switched to sprinting after two seasons. He represented Germany at the Junior World Track Championships in 2010, placing third in the team sprint and fourth in the individual sprint. Later that year Hindes moved to the United Kingdom and joined British Cycling's Olympic Academy Programme. He received clearance to ride for Great Britain after the International Olympic Committee (IOC) executive board waived the regulation that would have required him to wait three years before changing his national allegiance on account of his dual nationality.

In 2011 Hindes competed with Dave Daniell and Peter Mitchell in the men's team sprint at the Track Cycling World Cup in Beijing, finishing in sixth position.

Hindes is coached by Jan van Eijden and Iain Dyer.

Hindes was chosen to represent Great Britain at the 2012 UCI Track Cycling World Championships in Melbourne, Australia as part of the squad for the men's team sprint alongside Chris Hoy and Jason Kenny. Hindes replaced Ross Edgar in the team, after Edgar elected to focus on gym and road training. The trio were due to race in the bronze medal final but were relegated for an infringement in their qualifying heat.

In July 2012 Hindes was selected to compete for Great Britain at the 2012 Summer Olympics in the men's team sprint as part of a squad that also included four-time Olympic gold medalist Hoy, and double Olympic gold medalist Kenny. The event took place at the London Velopark on 2 August. The British trio won the gold medal and set new world records in both the first round and again in the final against France, while Hoy joined Steve Redgrave as the only British athletes to win five Olympic gold medals.

Following the gold medal win, Hindes said that he had deliberately crashed after a slow start to help his team. After winning the race, Hindes told the BBC "We were saying if we have a bad start we need to crash to get a restart. I just crashed, I did it on purpose to get a restart, just to have the fastest ride. I did it. So it was all planned, really." Under UCI rules, "races can be re-started if one of the riders suffers a "mishap", but it must be a mechanical fault or genuine accident." In a post-race press conference, Hindes gave a different account, stating "No. I just went out the gate and just lost control, just fell down...My back wheel slipped and totally lost control and I couldn’t handle the bike any more and just crashed." The British Cycling stated "Hindes had been misunderstood due to English not being his first language." No action was taken by the IOC. For this incident, Hindes was awarded with the fifth placing on Sports Illustrated's "Anti-Sportsman of the year".

Hindes was appointed Member of the Order of the British Empire (MBE) in the 2013 New Year Honours for services to cycling.

He was named as a member of the WIGGINS team for the 2016 season.

At the 2018 Commonwealth Games, Hindes won Silver in the team sprint event alongside Joseph Truman and Ryan Owens.

Hindes announced his retirement from track cycling in October 2021.
