= List of French records in track cycling =

The following are the national records in track cycling in France maintained by France's national cycling federation: Fédération Française de Cyclisme.

== Men ==
Awaiting ratification Record not kept by Fédération Française de Cyclisme Not ratified or later rescinded by the Fédération Française de Cyclisme

Event	Record	Athlete	Date	Meet	Place	Ref
Flying 200 m time trial	9.347	François Pervis	6 December 2013	World Cup	Aguascalientes City, Mexico	
250m time trial (standing start)	17.281	Timmy Gillion	1 February 2026	European Championships	Konya, Turkey	
Flying 500 m time trial	25.850	Arnaud Duble	10 October 2001		La Paz, Bolivia	
500 m time trial	31.805	Arnaud Tournant	29 October 1999		Grenoble, France	
Flying 1 km time trial	58.765 (Note: Time trial mark with standing start ratified as absolute record)	Frédéric Lancien	30 July 1993		Bordeaux, France	
1 km time trial	56.303	François Pervis	7 December 2013	World Cup	Aguascalientes City, Mexico	
1 km time trial (sea level)	58.884	Étienne Oliviero	16 October 2026	World Championships	Shanghai, China	
Team sprint	41.789	Timmy Gillion; Rayan Helal; Etienne Oliviero	1 February 2026	European Championships	Konya, Turkey	
4000m individual pursuit	4:05.364	Mathieu Dupé	3 February 2026	European Championships	Konya, Turkey	
4000m team pursuit	3:44.889	Valentin Tabellion; Oscar Nilsson-Julien; Mathieu Dupé; Ellande Larronde	2 February 2026	European Championships	Konya, Turkey	
Hour record (progression)	51.044 km	Louis Pijourlet	12 July 2022		Grenchen, Switzerland	
Hour record (UCI best human effort)	49.276 km	Dominique Chignoli	20 August 1993		Colorado Springs, United States	

== Women ==
Event	Record	Athlete	Date	Meet	Place	Ref
Flying 200 m time trial	10.173	Mathilde Gros	2 February 2026	European Championship	Konya, Turkey	
250 m time trial (standing start)	18.992	Mathilde Gros	12 October 2022	World Championships	Saint-Quentin-en-Yvelines, France	
Flying 500 m time trial	30.222	Félicia Ballanger	29 September 1997		Paris, France	
500 m time trial	32.835	Taky Marie-Divine Kouamé	15 October 2022	World Championships	Saint-Quentin-en-Yvelines, France	
1 km time trial	1:08.399	Taky Marie-Divine Kouamé	3 January 2025	French Championships	Loudéac, France	
1 km time trial	1:06.835	Taky Marie-Divine Kouamé	15 February 2025	European Championships	Heusden-Zolder, Belgium	
1 km time trial	1:03.328	Mathilde Gros	4 February 2026	European Championship	Konya, Turkey	
Team sprint (500 m)	33.160	Sandie Clair; Mathilde Gros	3 August 2018	European Championships	Glasgow, United Kingdom	
Team sprint (750 m)	46.786	Taky Marie-Divine Kouamé; Marie-Louisa Drouode; Mathilde Gros	1 February 2026	European Championships	Konya, Turkey	
3000m individual pursuit	3:20.780	Marion Borras	8 October 2021	European Championships	Grenchen, Switzerland	
4000m individual pursuit	4:42.730	Marion Borras	4 January 2025	French Championships	Loudéac, France	
4000m individual pursuit	4:30.335	Mélanie Dupin	4 February 2026	European Championships	Konya, Turkey	
3000m team pursuit	3:30.667	Roxane Fournier; Aude Biannic; Pascale Jeuland	3 October 2015		Bordeaux, France	
4000 m team pursuit	4:06.987	Clara Copponi; Valentine Fortin; Marion Borras; Marie Le Net	7 August 2024	Olympic Games	Saint-Quentin-en-Yvelines, France	
Hour record	45.094 km	Jeannie Longo	7 December 2000		Mexico City, Mexico	
Hour record (UCI best human effort)	48.159 km	Jeannie Longo	26 October 1996		Mexico City, Mexico	
