= James Hunter (rower) =

New Zealand rower (born 1992)

Personal information
- Born: 24 August 1992 (age 33)
- Height: 1.85 m (6 ft 1 in)
- Weight: 72 kg (159 lb)
Medal record
Men's rowing
Representing New Zealand
World Championships
Silver medal – second place	2013 Chungju	Lwt coxless four
Silver medal – second place	2014 Amsterdam	Lwt coxless four
Bronze medal – third place	2017 Sarasota	Coxless pair

James Hunter (born 24 August 1992) is a New Zealand rower.

At the 2013 World Rowing Championships held at Tangeum Lake, Chungju in South Korea, he won a silver medal in the lightweight men's four with James Lassche, Curtis Rapley, and Peter Taylor. At the 2014 World Rowing Championships held at Bosbaan, Amsterdam, he won a silver medal in the lightweight men's four with Peter Taylor, Alistair Bond, and Curtis Rapley. At the 2017 New Zealand rowing nationals at Lake Ruataniwha, he partnered with Tom Murray in the premier men's pair and they became national champions for the second year in a row. At the 2017 World Rowing Championships in Sarasota, Florida, he won a bronze medal with Murray.
