= Kayla McAlister =

Kayla Ahki
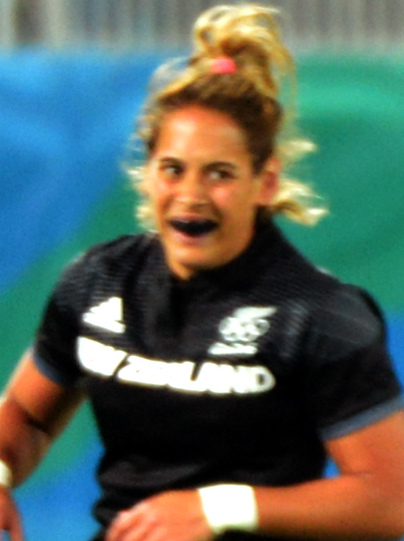
- McAlister in 2016
- Born: Kayla McAlister; 6 August 1988 (age 38)
- Height: 1.69 m (5 ft 7 in)
- Weight: 71 kg (157 lb)
- Notable relative(s): Charlie McAlister (father); Luke McAlister (brother)

Rugby union career
- Position: forward
National sevens team
Years	Team	Comps
2012–2020	New Zealand	92 apps
Medal record
Women's rugby sevens
Representing New Zealand
Olympic Games
Silver medal – second place	2016 Rio de Janeiro	Team competition

Kayla Ahki (née McAlister; born 6 August 1988) is a former New Zealand netball and international rugby sevens player. She played for the Northern Mystics in 2011, and a training partner in 2012, before switching to rugby. She was member of the NZ Women's Rugby Sevens team from 2012 to 2017, during which time the team won the Women's Sevens Series three times, the 2013 World Cup and silver at the 2016 Summer Olympics in Rio de Janeiro. McAlister was named the World Rugby Women's Player of the Year. On an individual level, she was named the world's best rugby sevens player in 2013.

== Early life ==
Kayla McAlister was born on 6 August 1988 to Trish (nee Montgomerie) and Charles "Charlie" Patrick McAlister. Her father Charlie played rugby union for Taranaki as well as rugby league professionally in Australia and England. He later coached the Manawatu Rugby Union team. Her mother played netball. Her older brother, Luke McAlister played rugby for the All Blacks. From the age of two months until she was eight she lived in Manchester while her father played rugby league for Oldham. In 1996 the family moved back to New Zealand and settled in Whangaparāoa on the Hibiscus Coast, where she attended Westlake Girls High School, graduating in 2006. Here she played netball and some touch rugby.

== Netball career ==
While a teenager McAlister played netball for the Western Flyers in the National Bank Cup. After playing for one year with their second side McAlister was promoted in 2010 to the Auckland-Waitakere first division netball side. In 2010 she also became a training partner with the Northern Mystics and was promoted to their first team in 2011. She had little time on court, though she did get to play in that year's grand final. She was dropped from the playing squad down to a training partner in 2012.

== Rugby career ==
In 2012 the New Zealand Rugby Union organised a "Go for Gold" campaign to identify talent with the potential to represent New Zealand in the Sevens competition at the Rio Olympics. Her father Charlie sent her a link to the campaign's website, while her mother wanted her to continue with netball. Feeling her netball career was going backwards, McAlister attended one of the open trials. She said of the decision, "I was approaching my mid-20s and wasn't getting any younger, in a rut and this opportunity came up – one door shutting and another one opening." McAlister and Woodman, without telling their coaches, attended a "screening/trial night" in Auckland before enrolling in the "Go for Gold" program. At the trial she was put through various fitness, rugby skill and character assessment activities. Of the 800 who attended a trial, the 60 most promising then attended a camp at Waiouru in mid-2012.

Looking back McAlister commented on the experience, "We were up at 5 a.m. and doing an obstacle course in –5 degrees in water. I remember at the time we were saying, 'What were we thinking, have we made the right decision?'" This group was further reduced to 30, who then attended a second training camp at Waiouru, among whom were McAlister and Woodman.

=== Debut ===
Kayla McAlister made her debut for the sevens team when she was selected for the New Zealand team that won the 2012 Oceania Women's Sevens Championship which was held in Fiji on 3–4 August 2012. The team won the tournament, which gained New Zealand entry to the 2013 World Cup held in June 2012 in Moscow, Russia. They won the competition, beating Canada 29–12 in the final during which McAlister scored a try.

=== 2012–13 Seven Series Season ===
During the team's first season in the inaugural Women's Sevens Series, where she debuted at Dubai, she scored a total of 20 tries over the season's four tournaments, whereas her friend Woodman only scored five. New Zealand won three of the tournaments, and finishing fourth in the second tournament, to win the series.

=== 2013–14 Seven Series Season ===
Prior to playing sevens rugby McAlister was employed in a full-time administrative position at the Ministry of Justice. For the first two years of her rugby career, she would juggle the two, training from 6 to 8 a.m., working for eight hours and then training again in the evening. In 2014 after she was given the financial security of a contract she resigned from the Ministry of Justice due to the increasing demands of rugby training every day plus travelling to tournaments. The giving up of her full time job did however allow her the opportunity to begin studying part-time towards a childcare qualification.

New Zealand won the Women's Sevens Series for the second time by winning the final tournament in Amsterdam, the third victory of the season, winning 29–12 against Australia with McAlister contributing a try. With 20 tries, McAlister was New Zealand's leading try scorer in the 2013–14 season, one more than Woodman.

=== 2014–15 Seven Series Season ===
Following a serious neck injury towards the end of the 2013–14 season she was unavailable for the latter half of 2014 and narrowly missed selection for the Dubai tournament, which signalled the start of the 2014–15 Sevens Series season. McAlister scored 12 tries for Auckland to assist them in winning the national provincial women's sevens title in Rotorua in early January 2015, for which she was awarded the Anna Richards Trophy for the best women player. This performance ensured that McAlister was among the 19 players contracted for 2015. Her appearance for the New Zealand team was at the São Paulo tournament in March 2015.

=== 2015–16 Seven Series Season ===
She missed the start of the 2015–16 season at Dubai due to a foot injury, but was still named in January 2016 as a member of squad of 22 contracted for the 2016 year. Upon her return she scored two tries in the quarter-final and two in the semi-final lost to Canada at the São Paulo tournament, her only tournament of the season before the last tournament played in France.

Despite missing the start of the season she still was able to score 15 tries by its competition.

=== 2016 Rio Olympic Games ===
McAlister was a member of the New Zealand woman sevens team that competed in the 2016 Summer Olympics in Rio de Janeiro. She scored seven tries during the women's tournament, two against Kenya, two against Spain and one against France during the three victories in the first round, then two in the final, which the team lost to Australia, 24–17, earning McAlister a silver medal.

Following the Olympics, McAlister took a year away from the game in order to have a daughter. She was the first New Zealand Sevens player to have a baby and at the time there was no provision for maternity leave in the player contracts. As a result of discussion between McAlister, the New Zealand Rugby Players Association and New Zealand Rugby, arrangement were agreed on how she and future mothers were to be accommodated. Three months after giving birth she returned to training.

=== 2017–18 Seven Series Season ===
McAlister's first tournament, seven months after giving birth was at the first tournament of the 2017–18 World Rugby Women's Sevens Series which was held in Dubai on 30 November to 1 December 2017. Her daughter travelled with her, along with a paid support person in the form of her mother. After her husband Pita Ahki signed a contract to play rugby in Ireland for Connacht, McAlister decided that trying to balance her sevens commitments and while trying to maintain a long distance relationship and bring up their child was too much and she stepped away from the New Zealand and moved to Ireland with her 10-month-old daughter and husband. As a result she was not contracted for the New Zealand Sevens team announced in February 2018. Once in Galway she began playing 15-a-side rugby for the Galwegians club making her debut against Blackrock in February 2018. Soon after arriving in Ireland, she played for the Barbarian women against the Army at Aldershot on 17 March 2018, which the team won 37–0.

After the end of the 2017–18 rugby season, the family moved in 2018 to France after her husband signed a contract to play for the French club Toulouse.

=== COVID-19 ===
Wanting to participate in the upcoming Tokyo Olympics, McAlister returned to New Zealand, where she displayed sufficient form in domestic competition for New Zealand Rugby to announce in February 2020 that she had been awarded a contract for the next 12 months.

However, the COVID-19 pandemic caused the Olympics to be postponed and ended McAlister's rugby plans. She rejoined her husband in France via a free ride on the reparation flight organised by the French government. She did not attempt to qualify for the rescheduled Olympics, though she did provide commentary for Sky Sports on the Sevens competition.

McAlister's rugby sevens career ended with her having played 92 games, scoring a total of 425 points from 85 tries, and receiving two yellow cards.

== Awards and honours ==
McAlister won the inaugural World Rugby Women's Sevens Player of the Year awarded in 2013. She was nominated for the same award in 2014, a title which was ultimately awarded to the Australian Emilee Cherry.

== Personal life ==
Of Māori descent, McAlister affiliates to the Te Āti Awa iwi. In the years leading up to the Rio Olympics, she studied for a Certificate in Early Childhood Teaching, but put it on hold after passing her first year to devote her time to rugby.

In 2013 she met fellow professional rugby player Pita Ahki whom she married in December 2017. Their daughter Stella Rose Ahki was born in 2017. McAlister gave birth to a second child Camille while she was in France and since then has had a third child.
