= List of New Zealand records in track cycling =

The following are the national records in track cycling in New Zealand maintained by New Zealand's national cycling federation.

== Men ==
Event	Record	Athlete	Date	Meet	Place	Ref
Flying 200m time trial	9.470	Sam Dakin	7 August 2024	Olympic Games	Saint-Quentin-en-Yvelines, France	
250m time trial (standing start)	16.995	Ethan Mitchell	11 August 2016	Olympic Games	Rio de Janeiro, Brazil	
Team sprint	42.508	Edward Dawkins; Ethan Mitchell; Sam Webster	16 October 2019	Oceania Championships	Invercargill, New Zealand	
1km time trial	59.148	Simon Van Velthooven	7 December 2013	World Cup	Aguascalientes, Mexico	
1 km time trial (sea level)	59.614	Nick Kergozou	21 July 2021	National Records Night	Cambridge, New Zealand	
4000m individual pursuit	4:06.468	Aaron Gate	15 February 2024	Oceania Championships	Cambridge, New Zealand	
4000m team pursuit	3:42.397	Aaron Gate; Campbell Stewart; Regan Gough; Jordan Kerby	3 August 2021	Olympic Games	Izu, Japan	
Hour record	51.623 km	Rob Scarlett	15 February 2025		Cambridge, New Zealand	

== Women ==
Event	Record	Athlete	Date	Meet	Place	Ref
Flying 200m time trial	10.108	Ellesse Andrews	9 August 2024	Olympic Games	Saint-Quentin-en-Yvelines, France	
250m time trial (standing start)	19.029	Olivia Podmore	6 December 2019	World Cup	Cambridge, New Zealand	
500 m time trial	33.478	Shaane Fulton	4 March 2024	New Zealand Championships	Cambridge, New Zealand	
500 m time trial (sea level)	33.478	Shaane Fulton	4 March 2024	New Zealand Championships	Cambridge, New Zealand	
1 km time trial	1:04.523	Ellesse Andrews	25 October 2025	World Championships	Santiago, Chile	
Team sprint (500 m)	32.794	Natasha Hansen; Olivia Podmore	6 December 2019	World Cup	Cambridge, New Zealand	
Team sprint (750 m)	45.348	Rebecca Petch; Shaane Fulton; Ellesse Andrews	5 August 2024	Olympic Games	Saint-Quentin-en-Yvelines, France	
3000m individual pursuit	3.17.827	Bryony Botha	2 March 2024	New Zealand Championships	Cambridge, New Zealand	
4000m individual pursuit	4:29.111	Bryony Botha	11 February 2026	Oceania Championships	Cambridge, New Zealand	
3000m team pursuit	3:18.514	Lauren Ellis; Jaime Nielsen; Alison Shanks	4 August 2012	Olympic Games	London, United Kingdom	
4000m team pursuit	4:04.679	Ally Wollaston; Bryony Botha; Emily Shearman; Nicole Shields	6 August 2024	Olympic Games	Saint-Quentin-en-Yvelines, France	
Hour record	47.791 km	Jaime Nielsen	21 July 2017		Cambridge, New Zealand	
