= Rowing at the 2020 Summer Olympics – Men's coxless four =

Men's coxless four at the Games of the XXXII Olympiad
- Olympic rowing
- Venue: Sea Forest Waterway
- Dates: 24–28 July 2021
- Competitors: 40 from 10 nations
- Winning time: 5:42.76

Medalists
| 1st place, gold medalist(s) | | Alexander Purnell; Spencer Turrin; Jack Hargreaves; Alexander Hill | Australia |
| 2nd place, silver medalist(s) | | Mihăiță Țigănescu; Mugurel Semciuc; Ștefan Berariu; Cosmin Pascari | Romania |
| 3rd place, bronze medalist(s) | | Matteo Castaldo; Matteo Lodo; Giuseppe Vicino; Marco Di Costanzo; Bruno Rosetti (h) | Italy |

The men's coxless four event at the 2020 Summer Olympics took place from 24–28 July 2021 at the Sea Forest Waterway. 40 rowers from 10 nations competed.

The defending gold medallists were nine-time winners Great Britain, attempting to defend their title for a sixth successive time. Their crew finished in fourth placed in the final and outside the medals.

== Background ==
This was the 25th appearance of the event.

In 2019, at the World Rowing Championships, Poland, in an upset, won the final of the event, qualifying for the coxless four at the 2020 Summer Olympics, thus being the first qualifying nation in the men's event. It is Poland's eighth appearance in the coxless four (men's). Their most recent appearance was at the 2004 Summer Olympics. South Africa and Canada qualified via the final qualification regatta, defeating France, Austria, Belarus and Ukraine.

The other nine nations to qualify were: Romania, Great Britain, Italy, the United States, Australia, the Netherlands, Switzerland, South Africa, and Canada.

== Qualification ==
Each National Olympic Committee (NOC) has been limited to a single boat (four rowers) in the event. There are 10 qualifying places in the men's coxless four, thus there are forty athletes:

- 8 from 2019 World Rowing Championships (Men's coxless four)
- 2 from the final qualification regatta.

The COVID-19 pandemic delayed many of qualification events.

== Competition format ==
During the first round two heats were held. The first two boats in each heat advanced to final A, with the others relegated to the repechage.

The repechage is a round which offers rowers a second chance to qualify for Final A. The top two boats in the repechage moved on to the semi-finals, with the remaining boats being sent to Final B.

There were two finals. Final A determined the medallists and the places through 6th. Final B determined places seven through ten.

== Schedule ==
The competition was held over four days. Times given are session start times; multiple rowing events might have races during a session.

All times are Japan Standard Time (UTC+9)

| Date | Time | Round |
|---|---|---|
| Saturday, 24 July 2021 | 11:40 | Heats |
| Sunday, 25 July 2021 | 13:10 | Repechage |
| Wednesday, 28 July 2021 | 8:40 | Final B |
| Wednesday, 28 July 2021 | 10:10 | Final A |

== Rowers per team ==
| Number | Rowers | Nation |
|---|---|---|
| 1 | Alexander Purnell - Spencer Turrin - Jack Hargreaves - Alexander Hill | Australia |
| 2 | Jakub Buczek - Luke Gadsdon - Gavin Stone - Will Crothers | Canada |
| 3 | Oliver Cook - Matthew Rossiter - Rory Gibbs - Sholto Carnegie | Great Britain |
| 4 | Matteo Castaldo - Marco Di Costanzo - Matteo Lodo - Giuseppe Vicino - Bruno Rosetti (heat) | Italy |
| 5 | Jan van der Bij - Boudewijn Röell - Sander de Graaf - Nelson Ritsema | Netherlands |
| 6 | Mateusz Wilangowski - Mikołaj Burda - Marcin Brzeziński - Michał Szpakowski | Poland |
| 7 | Mihăiță Țigănescu - Mugurel Semciuc - Ștefan Berariu - Cosmin Pascari | Romania |
| 8 | Lawrence Brittain - Kyle Schoonbee - John Smith - Sandro Torrente | South Africa |
| 9 | Paul Jacquot - Markus Kessler - Joel Schürch - Andrin Gulich | Switzerland |
| 10 | Andrew Reed - Anders Weiss - Michael Grady - Clark Dean | United States |

== Results ==
=== Heats ===
The first two of each heat qualify for Final A, while the remainder go to the repechage phase in a second bid to qualify for the final.

==== Heat 1 ====
| Rank | Lane | Nation | Time | Notes |
|---|---|---|---|---|
| 1 | 1 | Australia | 5:54.27 | Q |
| 2 | 5 | United States | 5:57.27 | Q |
| 3 | 3 | Netherlands | 6:00.27 | R |
| 4 | 2 | Romania | 6:03.51 | R |
| 5 | 4 | South Africa | 6:25.34 | R |

==== Heat 2 ====
| Rank | Lane | Nation | Time | Notes |
|---|---|---|---|---|
| 1 | 1 | Great Britain | 5:55.36 | Q |
| 2 | 5 | Italy | 5:57.67 | Q |
| 3 | 3 | Poland | 6:03.38 | R |
| 4 | 2 | Switzerland | 6:04.09 | R |
| 5 | 4 | Canada | 6:05.47 | R |

=== Repechage ===
The first two in repechage heat qualify for Final A and rest go to Final B.

==== Repechage Heat ====
| Rank | Lane | Nation | Time | Notes |
|---|---|---|---|---|
| 1 | 2 | Romania | 6:09.72 | Q |
| 2 | 3 | Netherlands | 6:11.22 | Q |
| 3 | 4 | Poland | 6:12.52 | FB |
| 4 | 1 | Canada | 6:15.86 | FB |
| 5 | 5 | Switzerland | 6:27.80 | FB |
| 6 | 6 | South Africa | 6:30.34 | FB |

=== Finals ===
==== Final A ====
| Rank | Lane | Nation | Time | Notes |
|---|---|---|---|---|
| 1st place, gold medalist(s) | 3 | Australia | 5:42.76 | OB |
| 2nd place, silver medalist(s) | 1 | Romania | 5:43.13 | |
| 3rd place, bronze medalist(s) | 5 | Italy | 5:43.60 | |
| 4 | 4 | Great Britain | 5:45.78 | |
| 5 | 2 | United States | 5:48.85 | |
| 6 | 6 | Netherlands | 5:50.81 | |

==== Final B ====
| Rank | Lane | Nation | Time | Notes |
|---|---|---|---|---|
| 7 | 2 | Poland | 5:57.17 | |
| 8 | 3 | Canada | 5:58.29 | |
| 9 | 1 | Switzerland | 6:02.32 | |
| 10 | 4 | South Africa | 6:09.85 | |
