= 2018 World Rowing Championships – Men's coxless four =

Men's coxless four at the 2018 World Rowing Championships
- Venue: Plovdiv Regatta Venue
- Location: Plovdiv, Bulgaria
- Dates: 9–15 September
- Competitors: 76 from 19 nations
- Winning time: 5:44.74

Medalists
gold medal	Joshua Hicks; Spencer Turrin; Jack Hargreaves; Alexander Hill	Australia
silver medal	Matteo Castaldo; Bruno Rosetti; Matteo Lodo; Marco Di Costanzo	Italy
bronze medal	Thomas Ford; Jacob Dawson; Adam Neill; James Johnston	Great Britain

The men's coxless four competition at the 2018 World Rowing Championships in Plovdiv took place at the Plovdiv Regatta Venue.

== Schedule ==
The schedule was as follows:

Date	Time	Round
Sunday 9 September 2018	16:19	Heats
Tuesday 11 September 2018	11:21	Repechages
Thursday 13 September 2018	12:30	Semifinals A/B
Thursday 13 September 2018	15:33	Semifinals C/D
Saturday 15 September 2018	10:18	Final B
Saturday 15 September 2018	12:46	Final A
Saturday 15 September 2018	15:17	Final C
Saturday 15 September 2018	16:05	Final D

All times are Eastern European Summer Time (UTC+3)

== Results ==
=== Heats ===
The two fastest boats in each heat advanced directly to the A/B semifinals. The remaining boats were sent to the repechages.

==== Heat 1 ====
Rank	Rowers	Country	Time	Notes
1	Bjorn van den Ende; Tone Wieten; Jasper Tissen; Bram Schwarz	Netherlands	5:48.61	SA/B
2	Kyle Schoonbee; David Hunt; John Smith; Sandro Torrente	South Africa	5:51.28	SA/B
3	Steffen Jensen; Toger Rasmussen; Joachim Sutton; Tobias Kempf	Denmark	5:51.93	R
4	Alexander Richards; Michael Clougher; Nicholas Mead; Dariush Aghai	United States	5:55.37	R
5	Nelson Martínez; Francisco Lapostol; Ignacio Abraham; Oscar Vasquez	Chile	6:08.43	R

==== Heat 2 ====
Rank	Rowers	Country	Time	Notes
1	Matteo Castaldo; Bruno Rosetti; Matteo Lodo; Marco Di Costanzo	Italy	5:50.96	SA/B
2	Mihăiță Țigănescu; Cosmin Pascari; Ștefan Berariu; Ciprian Huc	Romania	5:53.35	SA/B
3	Vadzim Lialin; Dzmitry Vyberanets; Ihar Pashevich; Mikalai Sharlap	Belarus	5:55.92	R
4	Florian Walk; Maximilian Kohlmayr; Rudolph Querfeld; Gabriel Hohensasser	Austria	6:01.73	R
5	Paul Jacquot; Markus Kessler; Augustin Maillefer; Benjamin Hirsch	Switzerland	6:01.79	R

==== Heat 3 ====
Rank	Rowers	Country	Time	Notes
1	Joshua Hicks; Spencer Turrin; Jack Hargreaves; Alexander Hill	Australia	5:52.65	SA/B
2	Felix Brummel; Nico Merget; Peter Kluge; Felix Drahotta	Germany	5:54.76	SA/B
3	Jakub Grabmüller; Matyáš Klang; Petr Melichar; Matej Tikal	Czech Republic	6:00.53	R
4	Angus McFarlane; Matthew MacDonald; Thomas Mackintosh; Thomas Russel	New Zealand	6:02.49	R
5	Maksim Golubev; Semen Yaganov; Ivan Balandin; Daniil Andrienko	Russia	6:05.61	R

==== Heat 4 ====
Rank	Rowers	Country	Time	Notes
1	Thomas Ford; Jacob Dawson; Adam Neill; James Johnston	Great Britain	5:51.41	SA/B
2	Zbigniew Schodowski; Mateusz Wilangowski; Mikołaj Burda; Michał Szpakowski	Poland	5:54.13	SA/B
3	Benoît Demey; Edouard Jonville; Sean Vedrinelle; Benoît Brunet	France	5:56.64	R
4	Maksym Boklazhenko; Dmytro Hula; Vladyslav Bogoiavlenskyi; Oleksii Tymoshenko	Ukraine	6:07.85	R

=== Repechages ===
The two fastest boats in each repechage advanced to the A/B semifinals. The remaining boats were sent to the C/D semifinals.

==== Repechage 1 ====
Rank	Rowers	Country	Time	Notes
1	Vadzim Lialin; Dzmitry Vyberanets; Ihar Pashevich; Mikalai Sharlap	Belarus	5:50.90	SA/B
2	Maksym Boklazhenko; Dmytro Hula; Vladyslav Bogoiavlenskyi; Oleksii Tymoshenko	Ukraine	5:51.56	SA/B
3	Angus McFarlane; Matthew MacDonald; Thomas Mackintosh; Thomas Russel	New Zealand	5:53.09	SC/D
4	Steffen Jensen; Toger Rasmussen; Joachim Sutton; Tobias Kempf	Denmark	5:54.28	SC/D
5	Maksim Golubev; Semen Yaganov; Ivan Balandin; Daniil Andrienko	Russia	5:56.51	SC/D
6	Nelson Martínez; Francisco Lapostol; Ignacio Abraham; Oscar Vasquez	Chile	5:58.68	SC/D

==== Repechage 2 ====
Rank	Rowers	Country	Time	Notes
1	Jakub Grabmüller; Matyáš Klang; Petr Melichar; Matej Tikal	Czech Republic	5:52.87	SA/B
2	Paul Jacquot; Markus Kessler; Augustin Maillefer; Benjamin Hirsch	Switzerland	5:53.47	SA/B
3	Alexander Richards; Michael Clougher; Nicholas Mead; Dariush Aghai	United States	5:56.07	SC/D
4	Benoit Demey; Edouard Jonville; Sean Vedrinelle; Benoît Brunet	France	5:56.23	SC/D
5	Florian Walk; Maximilian Kohlmayr; Rudolph Querfeld; Gabriel Hohensasser	Austria	6:06.55	SC/D

=== Semifinals C/D ===
All but the slowest boat in each semi were sent to the C final. The slowest boats were sent to the D final.

==== Semifinal 1 ====
Rank	Rowers	Country	Time	Notes
1	Florian Walk; Maximilian Kohlmayr; Rudolph Querfeld; Gabriel Hohensasser	Austria	6:05.67	FC
2	Benoit Demey; Edouard Jonville; Sean Vedrinelle; Benoît Brunet	France	6:07.85	FC
3	Angus McFarlane; Matthew MacDonald; Thomas Mackintosh; Thomas Russel	New Zealand	6:07.91	FC
4	Nelson Martínez; Francisco Lapostol; Ignacio Abraham; Oscar Vasquez	Chile	6:12.47	FD

==== Semifinal 2 ====
Rank	Rowers	Country	Time	Notes
1	Alexander Richards; Michael Clougher; Nicholas Mead; Dariush Aghai	United States	6:02.40	FC
2	Maksim Golubev; Semen Yaganov; Ivan Balandin; Daniil Andrienko	Russia	6:05.05	FC
3	Steffen Jensen; Toger Rasmussen; Joachim Sutton; Tobias Kempf	Denmark	6:08.78	FD

=== Semifinals A/B ===
The three fastest boats in each semi advanced to the A final. The remaining boats were sent to the B final.

==== Semifinal 1 ====
Rank	Rowers	Country	Time	Notes
1	Joshua Hicks; Spencer Turrin; Jack Hargreaves; Alexander Hill	Australia	5:57.99	FA
2	Bjorn van den Ende; Tone Wieten; Jasper Tissen; Bram Schwarz	Netherlands	5:58.84	FA
3	Mihăiță Țigănescu; Cosmin Pascari; Ștefan Berariu; Ciprian Huc	Romania	6:00.08	FA
4	Zbigniew Schodowski; Mateusz Wilangowski; Mikołaj Burda; Michał Szpakowski	Poland	6:04.00	FB
5	Vadzim Lialin; Dzmitry Vyberanets; Ihar Pashevich; Mikalai Sharlap	Belarus	6:15.85	FB
6	Paul Jacquot; Markus Kessler; Augustin Maillefer; Benjamin Hirsch	Switzerland	6:17.04	FB

==== Semifinal 2 ====
Rank	Rowers	Country	Time	Notes
1	Matteo Castaldo; Bruno Rosetti; Matteo Lodo; Marco Di Costanzo	Italy	6:01.74	FA
2	Thomas Ford; Jacob Dawson; Adam Neill; James Johnston	Great Britain	6:03.40	FA
3	Felix Brummel; Nico Merget; Peter Kluge; Felix Drahotta	Germany	6:04.44	FA
4	Kyle Schoonbee; David Hunt; John Smith; Sandro Torrente	South Africa	6:08.00	FB
5	Jakub Grabmüller; Matyáš Klang; Petr Melichar; Matej Tikal	Czech Republic	6:11.39	FB
6	Maksym Boklazhenko; Dmytro Hula; Vladyslav Bogoiavlenskyi; Oleksii Tymoshenko	Ukraine	6:24.18	FB

=== Finals ===
The A final determined the rankings for places 1 to 6. Additional rankings were determined in the other finals.

==== Final D ====
Rank	Rowers	Country	Time
1	Toger Rasmussen; Steffen Jensen; Tobias Kempf; Joachim Sutton	Denmark	6:02.66
2	Nelson Martínez; Francisco Lapostol; Ignacio Abraham; Oscar Vasquez	Chile	6:03.52

==== Final C ====
Rank	Rowers	Country	Time
1	Alexander Richards; Michael Clougher; Nicholas Mead; Dariush Aghai	United States	5:48.74
2	Benoit Demey; Edouard Jonville; Sean Vedrinelle; Benoît Brunet	France	5:51.26
3	Angus McFarlane; Matthew MacDonald; Thomas Mackintosh; Thomas Russel	New Zealand	5:53.19
4	Florian Walk; Maximilian Kohlmayr; Rudolph Querfeld; Gabriel Hohensasser	Austria	5:54.80
5	Maksim Golubev; Semen Yaganov; Ivan Balandin; Daniil Andrienko	Russia	5:58.36

==== Final B ====
Rank	Rowers	Country	Time
1	Zbigniew Schodowski; Mateusz Wilangowski; Mikołaj Burda; Michał Szpakowski	Poland	5:50.87
2	Vadzim Lialin; Dzmitry Vyberanets; Ihar Pashevich; Mikalai Sharlap	Belarus	5:52.24
3	Jakub Grabmüller; Matyáš Klang; Petr Melichar; Matej Tikal	Czech Republic	5:52.78
4	Kyle Schoonbee; David Hunt; John Smith; Sandro Torrente	South Africa	5:52.84
5	Paul Jacquot; Markus Kessler; Augustin Maillefer; Benjamin Hirsch	Switzerland	6:00.13
6	Maksym Boklazhenko; Dmytro Hula; Vladyslav Bogoiavlenskyi; Oleksii Tymoshenko	Ukraine	6:04.81

==== Final A ====
Rank	Rowers	Country	Time
1st place, gold medalist(s)	Joshua Hicks; Spencer Turrin; Jack Hargreaves; Alexander Hill	Australia	5:44.74
2nd place, silver medalist(s)	Matteo Castaldo; Bruno Rosetti; Matteo Lodo; Marco Di Costanzo	Italy	5:44.99
3rd place, bronze medalist(s)	Thomas Ford; Jacob Dawson; Adam Neill; James Johnston	Great Britain	5:46.46
4	Bjorn van den Ende; Tone Wieten; Jasper Tissen; Bram Schwarz	Netherlands	5:47.78
5	Mihăiță Țigănescu; Cosmin Pascari; Ștefan Berariu; Ciprian Huc	Romania	5:50.71
6	Felix Brummel; Nico Merget; Peter Kluge; Felix Drahotta	Germany	5:55.32
