= 2019 World Rowing Championships – Men's coxless four =

Men's coxless four at the 2019 World Rowing Championships
- Venue: Linz-Ottensheim
- Location: Ottensheim, Austria
- Dates: 25–31 August
- Competitors: 88 from 22 nations
- Winning time: 6:09.86

Medalists
gold medal	Mateusz Wilangowski; Mikołaj Burda; Marcin Brzeziński; Michał Szpakowski	Poland
silver medal	Mihăiță Țigănescu; Mugurel Semciuc; Ștefan Berariu; Cosmin Pascari	Romania
bronze medal	Matthew Rossiter; Oliver Cook; Rory Gibbs; Sholto Carnegie	Great Britain

The men's coxless four competition at the 2019 World Rowing Championships took place at the Linz-Ottensheim regatta venue. A top-eight finish ensured qualification for the Tokyo Olympics.

== Schedule ==
The schedule was as follows:

Date	Time	Round
Sunday 25 August 2019	11:56	Heats
Tuesday 27 August 2019	10:00	Repechages
Wednesday 28 August 2019	17:10	Semifinals C/D
Thursday 29 August 2019	12:02	Semifinals A/B
Friday 30 August 2019	09:50	Final D
Saturday 31 August 2019	10:25	Final C
Saturday 31 August 2019	12:00	Final B
Saturday 31 August 2019	14:42	Final A

All times are Central European Summer Time (UTC+2)

== Results ==
=== Heats ===
Heat winners advanced directly to the A/B semifinals. The remaining boats were sent to the repechages.

==== Heat 1 ====
Rank	Rowers	Country	Time	Notes
1	Matthew Rossiter; Oliver Cook; Rory Gibbs; Sholto Carnegie	Great Britain	6:02.62	SA/B
2	Felix Brummel; Felix Wimberger; Max Planer; Nico Merget	Germany	6:05.06	R
3	Édouard Jonville; Julien Montet; Benoît Demey; Benoît Brunet	France	6:06.49	R
4	Benjamin Taylor; Ian Seymour; Thomas Mackintosh; Thomas Russel	New Zealand	6:07.17	R
5	Markus Kessler; Paul Jacquot; Augustin Maillefer; Joel Schuerch	Switzerland	6:11.24	R
6	Mohamed Eissa; Sayed Salman; Ali Hassan; Ibrahim Elserougy	Egypt	6:26.82	R

==== Heat 2 ====
Rank	Rowers	Country	Time	Notes
1	Marco Di Costanzo; Giovanni Abagnale; Bruno Rosetti; Matteo Castaldo	Italy	6:00.84	SA/B
2	Thomas Peszek; Thomas Dethlefs; Andrew Reed; Clark Dean	United States	6:03.42	R
3	Gabriel Hohensasser; Rudolph Querfeld; Maximilian Kohlmayr; Ferdinand Querfeld	Austria	6:05.73	R
4	Alexandr Stradaev; Nikita Morgachyov; Maksim Golubev; Grigorii Shchulepov	Russia	6:08.66	R
5	Roman Piven; Artem Moroz; Maksym Boklazhenko; Dmytro Hula	Ukraine	6:09.27	R
6	Jasveer Singh; Gurinder Singh; Punit Kumar; Gurmeet Singh	India	6:30.49	R

==== Heat 3 ====
Rank	Rowers	Country	Time	Notes
1	Joseph O'Brien; Nicholas Purnell; Jack Hargreaves; Alexander Hill	Australia	6:04.21	SA/B
2	Vincent van der Want; Boudewijn Röell; Jan van der Bij; Nelson Ritsema	Netherlands	6:05.76	R
3	Vadzim Lialin; Dzmitry Vyberanets; Dzianis Suravets; Mikalai Sharlap	Belarus	6:07.18	R
4	Frederic Vystavel; Frank Steffensen; Tobias Kempf; Toger Rasmussen	Denmark	6:12.21	R
5	Uktamjon Davronov; Sardor Tulkinkhujaev; Alisher Turdiev; Dostonjon Bahriev	Uzbekistan	6:34.93	R

==== Heat 4 ====
Rank	Rowers	Country	Time	Notes
1	Mateusz Wilangowski; Mikołaj Burda; Marcin Brzeziński; Michał Szpakowski	Poland	6:01.52	SA/B
2	Mihăiță Țigănescu; Mugurel Semciuc; Ștefan Berariu; Cosmin Pascari	Romania	6:06.59	R
3	David Hunt; Sandro Torrente; Kyle Schoonbee; Jake Green	South Africa	6:10.73	R
4	Matěj Mach; Matyáš Klang; Petr Melichar; Matej Tikal	Czech Republic	6:12.49	R
5	Igor Djeric; Veselin Savić; Nenad Beđik; Viktor Pivač	Serbia	6:12.71	R

=== Repechages ===
The two fastest boats in each repechage advanced to the A/B semifinals. The remaining boats were sent to the C/D semifinals.

==== Repechage 1 ====
Rank	Rowers	Country	Time	Notes
1	Felix Brummel; Felix Wimberger; Max Planer; Nico Merget	Germany	5:59.17	SA/B
2	Igor Djeric; Veselin Savić; Nenad Beđik; Viktor Pivač	Serbia	6:00.00	SA/B
3	Gabriel Hohensasser; Maximilian Kohlmayr; Rudolph Querfeld; Ferdinand Querfeld	Austria	6:03.46	SC/D
4	Frederic Vystavel; Frank Steffensen; Tobias Kempf; Toger Rasmussen	Denmark	6:07.41	SC/D
5	Mohamed Eissa; Sayed Salman; Ali Hassan; Ibrahim Elserougy	Egypt	6:21.38	SC/D

==== Repechage 2 ====
Rank	Rowers	Country	Time	Notes
1	Thomas Peszek; Thomas Dethlefs; Andrew Reed; Clark Dean	United States	6:00.78	SA/B
2	Markus Kessler; Paul Jacquot; Augustin Maillefer; Joel Schuerch	Switzerland	6:01.75	SA/B
3	Vadzim Lialin; Dzmitry Vyberanets; Dzianis Suravets; Mikalai Sharlap	Belarus	6:03.95	SC/D
4	Matěj Mach; Matej Tikal; Petr Melichar; Matyáš Klang	Czech Republic	6:12.97	SC/D
5	Jasveer Singh; Gurinder Singh; Punit Kumar; Gurmeet Singh	India	6:27.69	SC/D

==== Repechage 3 ====
Rank	Rowers	Country	Time	Notes
1	Vincent van der Want; Boudewijn Röell; Jan van der Bij; Nelson Ritsema	Netherlands	6:03.23	SA/B
2	David Hunt; Sandro Torrente; Kyle Schoonbee; Jake Green	South Africa	6:05.91	SA/B
3	Benjamin Taylor; Ian Seymour; Thomas Mackintosh; Thomas Russel	New Zealand	6:08.14	SC/D
4	Roman Piven; Artem Moroz; Maksym Boklazhenko; Dmytro Hula	Ukraine	6:16.19	SC/D

==== Repechage 4 ====
Rank	Rowers	Country	Time	Notes
1	Mihăiţă Ţigănescu; Mugurel Semciuc; Ștefan Berariu; Cosmin Pascari	Romania	6:00.21	SA/B
2	Édouard Jonville; Julien Montet; Benoît Demey; Benoît Brunet	France	6:05.23	SA/B
3	Alexandr Stradaev; Nikita Morgachyov; Maksim Golubev; Grigorii Shchulepov	Russia	6:10.36	SC/D
4	Uktamjon Davronov; Sardor Tulkinkhujaev; Alisher Turdiev; Dostonjon Bahriev	Uzbekistan	6:30.25	SC/D

=== Semifinals C/D ===
The three fastest boats in each semi were sent to the C final. The remaining boats were sent to the D final.

==== Semifinal 1 ====
Rank	Rowers	Country	Time	Notes
1	Gabriel Hohensasser; Maximilian Kohlmayr; Rudolph Querfeld; Ferdinand Querfeld	Austria	6:02.02	FC
2	Roman Piven; Artem Moroz; Maksym Boklazhenko; Dmytro Hula	Ukraine	6:05.09	FC
3	Alexandr Stradaev; Nikita Morgachyov; Maksim Golubev; Grigorii Shchulepov	Russia	6:06.03	FC
4	Matěj Mach; Matej Tikal; Petr Melichar; Matyáš Klang	Czech Republic	6:11.43	FD
5	Ali Hassan; Sayed Salman; Mohamed Eissa; Ibrahim Elserougy	Egypt	6:24.64	FD

==== Semifinal 2 ====
Rank	Rowers	Country	Time	Notes
1	Benjamin Taylor; Ian Seymour; Thomas Mackintosh; Thomas Russel	New Zealand	6:06.15	FC
2	Frederic Vystavel; Frank Steffensen; Tobias Kempf; Toger Rasmussen	Denmark	6:09.73	FC
3	Vadzim Lialin; Dzmitry Vyberanets; Dzianis Suravets; Mikalai Sharlap	Belarus	6:12.95	FC
4	Jasveer Singh; Gurinder Singh; Punit Kumar; Gurmeet Singh	India	6:17.90	FD
5	Uktamjon Davronov; Sardor Tulkinkhujaev; Alisher Turdiev; Dostonjon Bahriev	Uzbekistan	6:18.99	FD

=== Semifinals A/B ===
The three fastest boats in each semi advanced to the A final. The remaining boats were sent to the B final.

==== Semifinal 1 ====
Rank	Rowers	Country	Time	Notes
1	Mihăiță Țigănescu; Mugurel Semciuc; Ștefan Berariu; Cosmin Pascari	Romania	5:47.70	FA
2	Matthew Rossiter; Oliver Cook; Rory Gibbs; Sholto Carnegie	Great Britain	5:47.93	FA
3	Marco Di Costanzo; Giovanni Abagnale; Bruno Rosetti; Matteo Castaldo	Italy	5:51.73	FA
4	Igor Djeric; Veselin Savić; Nenad Beđik; Viktor Pivač	Serbia	5:54.03	FB
5	Vincent van der Want; Boudewijn Röell; Jan van der Bij; Nelson Ritsema	Netherlands	5:56.65	FB
6	Markus Kessler; Paul Jacquot; Augustin Maillefer; Joel Schuerch	Switzerland	6:00.66	FB

==== Semifinal 2 ====
Rank	Rowers	Country	Time	Notes
1	Joseph O'Brien; Nicholas Purnell; Jack Hargreaves; Alexander Hill	Australia	5:44.21	FA
2	Mateusz Wilangowski; Mikołaj Burda; Marcin Brzeziński; Michał Szpakowski	Poland	5:46.97	FA
3	Thomas Peszek; Thomas Dethlefs; Andrew Reed; Clark Dean	United States	5:47.14	FA
4	Édouard Jonville; Julien Montet; Benoît Demey; Benoît Brunet	France	5:55.18	FB
5	Felix Brummel; Felix Wimberger; Max Planer; Nico Merget	Germany	5:56.27	FB
6	David Hunt; Sandro Torrente; Kyle Schoonbee; Jake Green	South Africa	5:58.06	FB

=== Finals ===
The A final determined the rankings for places 1 to 6. Additional rankings were determined in the other finals.

==== Final D ====
Rank	Rowers	Country	Time
1	Matěj Mach; Matej Tikal; Petr Melichar; Matyáš Klang	Czech Republic	6:11.68
2	Jasveer Singh; Gurinder Singh; Punit Kumar; Gurmeet Singh	India	6:13.72
3	Ali Hassan; Sayed Salman; Mohamed Eissa; Ibrahim Elserougy	Egypt	6:18.47
4	Uktamjon Davronov; Sardor Tulkinkhujaev; Alisher Turdiev; Dostonjon Bahriev	Uzbekistan	6:24.70

==== Final C ====
Rank	Rowers	Country	Time
1	Gabriel Hohensasser; Maximilian Kohlmayr; Rudolph Querfeld; Ferdinand Querfeld	Austria	5:57.73
2	Benjamin Taylor; Ian Seymour; Thomas Mackintosh; Thomas Russel	New Zealand	5:59.94
3	Vadzim Lialin; Dzmitry Vyberanets; Dzianis Suravets; Mikalai Sharlap	Belarus	6:00.06
4	Frederic Vystavel; Frank Steffensen; Tobias Kempf; Toger Rasmussen	Denmark	6:02.56
5	Alexandr Stradaev; Nikita Morgachyov; Maksim Golubev; Grigorii Shchulepov	Russia	6:04.94
6	Roman Piven; Artem Moroz; Maksym Boklazhenko; Dmytro Hula	Ukraine	6:07.79

==== Final B ====
Rank	Rowers	Country	Time
1	Vincent van der Want; Boudewijn Röell; Jan van der Bij; Nelson Ritsema	Netherlands	6:07.45
2	Markus Kessler; Paul Jacquot; Augustin Maillefer; Joel Schürch	Switzerland	6:08.13
3	Édouard Jonville; Julien Montet; Benoît Demey; Benoît Brunet	France	6:12.81
4	Felix Brummel; Felix Wimberger; Max Planer; Nico Merget	Germany	6:14.03
5	Igor Djeric; Veselin Savić; Nenad Beđik; Viktor Pivač	Serbia	6:15.70
6	David Hunt; Sandro Torrente; Kyle Schoonbee; Jake Green	South Africa	6:16.22

==== Final A ====
Rank	Rowers	Country	Time
1st place, gold medalist(s)	Mateusz Wilangowski; Mikołaj Burda; Marcin Brzeziński; Michał Szpakowski	Poland	6:09.86
2nd place, silver medalist(s)	Mihăiță Țigănescu; Mugurel Semciuc; Ștefan Berariu; Cosmin Pascari	Romania	6:11.41
3rd place, bronze medalist(s)	Matthew Rossiter; Oliver Cook; Rory Gibbs; Sholto Carnegie	Great Britain	6:11.71
4	Marco Di Costanzo; Giovanni Abagnale; Bruno Rosetti; Matteo Castaldo	Italy	6:13.39
5	Thomas Peszek; Thomas Dethlefs; Andrew Reed; Clark Dean	United States	6:13.40
6	Joseph O'Brien; Nicholas Purnell; Jack Hargreaves; Alexander Hill	Australia	6:15.98
