= Poland at the 2016 Summer Olympics =

- IOC code: POL
- NOC: Polish Olympic Committee
- Website: www.pkol.pl (in Polish)

in Rio de Janeiro
- Competitors: 243 in 23 sports
- Flag bearers: Karol Bielecki (opening); Marta Walczykiewicz (closing)
- Medals Ranked 33rd: Gold 2 Silver 3 Bronze 6 Total 11

Summer Olympics appearances (overview)
- 1924; 1928; 1932; 1936; 1948; 1952; 1956; 1960; 1964; 1968; 1972; 1976; 1980; 1984; 1988; 1992; 1996; 2000; 2004; 2008; 2012; 2016; 2020; 2024; 2028

Other related appearances
- Russian Empire (1900, 1912); Austria (1908–1912)

Poland competed at the 2016 Summer Olympics in Rio de Janeiro, Brazil, from 5 to 21 August 2016. Since the nation's official debut in 1924, Polish athletes have appeared in every edition of the Summer Olympic Games except the 1984 Summer Olympics in Los Angeles, because of the Soviet boycott.

== Medalists ==
Medal	Name	Sport	Event	Date
Gold	Magdalena Fularczyk; Natalia Madaj	Rowing	Women's double sculls	11 August
Gold	Anita Włodarczyk	Athletics	Women's hammer throw	15 August
Silver	Piotr Małachowski	Athletics	Men's discus throw	13 August
Silver	Marta Walczykiewicz	Canoeing	Women's K-1 200 metres	16 August
Silver	Maja Włoszczowska	Cycling	Women's cross-country	20 August
Bronze	Rafał Majka	Cycling	Men's road race	6 August
Bronze	Monika Ciaciuch; Agnieszka Kobus; Joanna Leszczyńska; Maria Springwald	Rowing	Women's quadruple sculls	11 August
Bronze	Beata Mikołajczyk; Karolina Naja	Canoeing	Women's K-2 500 metres	16 August
Bronze	Monika Michalik	Wrestling	Women's 63 kg	18 August
Bronze	Oktawia Nowacka	Modern pentathlon	Women's event	19 August
Bronze	Wojciech Nowicki	Athletics	Men's hammer throw	19 August

Medals by sport
Sport	1st place, gold medalist(s)	2nd place, silver medalist(s)	3rd place, bronze medalist(s)	Total
Athletics	1	1	1	3
Rowing	1	0	1	2
Canoeing	0	1	1	2
Cycling	0	1	1	2
Modern pentathlon	0	0	1	1
Wrestling	0	0	1	1
Total	2	3	6	11

Medals by day
Day	1st place, gold medalist(s)	2nd place, silver medalist(s)	3rd place, bronze medalist(s)	Total
August 6	0	0	1	1
August 7	0	0	0	0
August 8	0	0	0	0
August 9	0	0	0	0
August 10	0	0	0	0
August 11	1	0	1	2
August 12	0	0	0	0
August 13	0	1	0	1
August 14	0	0	0	0
August 15	1	0	0	1
August 16	0	1	1	2
August 17	0	0	0	0
August 18	0	0	1	1
August 19	0	0	2	2
August 20	0	1	0	1
August 21	0	0	0	0
Total	2	3	6	11

Medals by gender
Gender	1st place, gold medalist(s)	2nd place, silver medalist(s)	3rd place, bronze medalist(s)	Total
Male	0	1	2	3
Female	2	2	4	8
Total	2	3	6	11

== Competitors ==
The following is the list of number of competitors participating in the Games. Note that reserves in fencing and handball are not counted as athletes.

Sport	Men	Women	Total
Archery	0	1	1
Athletics	36	34	70
Badminton	4	1	5
Boxing	2	0	2
Canoeing	9	6	15
Cycling	7	10	17
Equestrian	1	0	1
Fencing	0	5	5
Gymnastics	0	1	1
Handball	14	0	14
Judo	1	3	4
Modern pentathlon	1	2	3
Rowing	16	10	26
Sailing	4	3	7
Shooting	1	4	5
Swimming	14	6	20
Table tennis	3	3	6
Taekwondo	2	0	2
Tennis	3	4	7
Triathlon	0	1	1
Volleyball	16	2	18
Weightlifting	4	1	5
Wrestling	4	4	8
Total	141	102	243

== Archery ==
One Polish archer qualified for the women's individual recurve by obtaining one of the eight Olympic places available from the 2015 World Archery Championships in Copenhagen, Denmark.

Athlete	Event	Ranking round		Round of 64	Round of 32	Round of 16	Quarterfinals	Semifinals	Final / BM	
Athlete	Event	Score	Seed	Opposition Score	Opposition Score	Opposition Score	Opposition Score	Opposition Score	Opposition Score	Rank
Karina Lipiarska-Pałka	Women's individual	620	40	Anagoz (TUR); L 5–6*	did not advance					

== Athletics ==
Polish athletes have so far achieved qualifying standards in the following athletics events (up to a maximum of 3 athletes in each event):

On May 6, 2016, the Polish Olympic Committee had selected the first batch of track and field athletes for the Games, featuring double Worlds champion and London 2012 Olympian Paweł Fajdek (hammer throw) and Beijing 2008 silver medalist Piotr Małachowski (discus throw).

Key

- Note–Ranks given for track events are within the athlete's heat only
- Q = Qualified for the next round
- q = Qualified for the next round as a fastest loser or, in field events, by position without achieving the qualifying target
- NR = National record
- N/A = Round not applicable for the event
- Bye = Athlete not required to compete in round

Track & road events
Men

Athlete	Event	Heat		Quarterfinal		Semifinal		Final	
Athlete	Event	Result	Rank	Result	Rank	Result	Rank	Result	Rank
Karol Zalewski	200 m	Bye		20.54	5	did not advance			
Rafał Omelko	400 m	45.54	4 q	—N/a		45.28	7	did not advance	
Adam Kszczot	800 m	1:45.83	1 Q	—N/a		1:44.70	3	did not advance	
Marcin Lewandowski	800 m	1:46.35	2 Q	—N/a		1:44.56	3 q	1:44.20	6
Damian Czykier	110 m hurdles	13.63	5 q	—N/a		13.50	3	did not advance	
Patryk Dobek	400 m hurdles	50.66	8	—N/a		did not advance			
Krystian Zalewski	3000 m steeplechase	8:34.52	10	—N/a				did not advance	
Kacper Kozłowski (reserve); Łukasz Krawczuk; Jakub Krzewina; Rafał Omelko; Michał Pietrzak	4 × 400 m relay	2:59.58	4 q	—N/a				3:00.50	7
Artur Kozłowski	Marathon	—N/a						2:17:34	39
Yared Shegumo	Marathon	—N/a						2:31:54	128
Henryk Szost	Marathon	—N/a						DNF	
Artur Brzozowski	20 km walk	—N/a						1:25.29	47
Jakub Jelonek	20 km walk	—N/a						1:21.52	19
Łukasz Nowak	20 km walk	—N/a						DSQ	
Rafał Augustyn	50 km walk	—N/a						3:55:01	22
Adrian Błocki	50 km walk	—N/a						3:51:31	15
Rafał Fedaczyński	50 km walk	—N/a						3:55:51	24

Women

Athlete	Event	Heat		Quarterfinal		Semifinal		Final	
Athlete	Event	Result	Rank	Result	Rank	Result	Rank	Result	Rank
Marika Popowicz-Drapała	100 m	Bye		11.70	6	did not advance			
Ewa Swoboda	100 m	Bye		11.24	2 Q	11.18	7	did not advance	
Anna Kiełbasińska	200 m	22.95	4	—N/a		did not advance			
Małgorzata Hołub	400 m	51.80	3 q	—N/a		51.93	7	did not advance	
Justyna Święty	400 m	51.82	3 q	—N/a		51.62	5	did not advance	
Patrycja Wyciszkiewicz	400 m	52.02	3 q	—N/a		52.51	8	did not advance	
Angelika Cichocka	800 m	2:00.42	1 Q	—N/a		2:01.29	8	did not advance	
Joanna Jóźwik	800 m	2:01.58	1 Q	—N/a		1:58.93	1 Q	1:57.37	5
Angelika Cichocka	1500 m	4:11.76	=5 Q	—N/a		4:17.83	12	did not advance	
Sofia Ennaoui	1500 m	4:06.90	3 Q	—N/a		4:05.29	6 q	4:14.72	10
Danuta Urbanik	1500 m	4:08.67	9 q	—N/a		4:11.34	10	did not advance	
Karolina Kołeczek	100 m hurdles	13.04	6	—N/a		did not advance			
Emilia Ankiewicz	400 m hurdles	55.89 PB	3 Q	—N/a		56.99	7	did not advance	
Joanna Linkiewicz	400 m hurdles	56.07	1 Q	—N/a		55.35	3	did not advance	
Matylda Kowal	3000 m steeplechase	9:35.13	8	—N/a				did not advance	
Agata Forkasiewicz (reserve); Anna Kiełbasińska; Klaudia Konopko; Marika Popowicz-Drapała; Katarzyna Sokólska (reserve); Ewa Swoboda	4 × 100 m relay	43.33	7	—N/a				did not advance	
Iga Baumgart; Martyna Dąbrowska (reserve); Małgorzata Hołub; Ewelina Ptak (reserve); Justyna Święty; Patrycja Wyciszkiewicz	4 × 400 m relay	3:25.34	3 Q	—N/a				3:27.28	7
Katarzyna Kowalska	Marathon	—N/a						DNF	
Iwona Lewandowska	Marathon	—N/a						2:31:41	21
Monika Stefanowicz	Marathon	—N/a						2:32:49	23
Paulina Buziak	20 km walk	—N/a						1:35:01	28
Agnieszka Dygacz	20 km walk	—N/a						DNF	
Agnieszka Szwarnóg	20 km walk	—N/a						1:38:01	44

Field events
Men

Athlete	Event	Qualification		Final	
Athlete	Event	Distance	Position	Distance	Position
Karol Hoffmann	Triple jump	16.79	7 q	16.31	12
Sylwester Bednarek	High jump	2.22	30	did not advance	
Wojciech Theiner	High jump	2.22	25	did not advance	
Piotr Lisek	Pole vault	5.70	6 q	5.75	4
Robert Sobera	Pole vault	5.60	13	did not advance	
Paweł Wojciechowski	Pole vault	5.45	=16	did not advance	
Konrad Bukowiecki	Shot put	20.71	6 Q	NM	—
Michał Haratyk	Shot put	19.97	18	did not advance	
Tomasz Majewski	Shot put	20.56	7 q	20.72	6
Piotr Małachowski	Discus throw	65.89	1 Q	67.55	2nd place, silver medalist(s)
Robert Urbanek	Discus throw	61.76	17	did not advance	
Łukasz Grzeszczuk	Javelin throw	76.52	31	did not advance	
Marcin Krukowski	Javelin throw	80.62	15	did not advance	
Paweł Fajdek	Hammer throw	72.00	17	did not advance	
Wojciech Nowicki	Hammer throw	77.64	1 Q	77.73	3rd place, bronze medalist(s)

Women

Athlete	Event	Qualification		Final	
Athlete	Event	Distance	Position	Distance	Position
Anna Jagaciak-Michalska	Triple jump	14.13	10 q	14.07	10
Kamila Lićwinko	High jump	1.94	9 Q	1.93	9
Paulina Guba	Shot put	17.70	13	did not advance	
Żaneta Glanc	Discus throw	57.88	17	did not advance	
Maria Andrejczyk	Javelin throw	67.11 NR	1 Q	64.78	4
Joanna Fiodorow	Hammer throw	71.77	4 q	69.87	9
Malwina Kopron	Hammer throw	69.69	15	did not advance	
Anita Włodarczyk	Hammer throw	76.93	1 Q	82.29 WR	1st place, gold medalist(s)

Combined events – Men's decathlon

Athlete	Event	100 m	LJ	SP	HJ	400 m	110H	DT	PV	JT	1500 m	Final	Rank
Paweł Wiesiołek	Result	10.88	6.73	14.17	2.01	50.18	15.09	48.32	4.50	56.68	4:42.77	7784	21
Paweł Wiesiołek	Points	888	750	739	813	806	839	835	760	688	666	7784	21

== Badminton ==
Poland has qualified five badminton players for each of the following events into the Olympic tournament. Adrian Dziółko was selected among the top 34 individual shuttlers in the men's singles, while the men's (Cwalina & Wacha) and mixed doubles (Mateusiak & Zięba) had claimed their Olympic spots each with a top 16 finish in the BWF World Rankings as of 5 May 2016.

Athlete	Event	Group Stage				Elimination	Quarterfinal	Semifinal	Final / BM	
Athlete	Event	Opposition Score	Opposition Score	Opposition Score	Rank	Opposition Score	Opposition Score	Opposition Score	Opposition Score	Rank
Adrian Dziółko	Men's singles	Cordón (GUA); W (18–21, 21–10, 21–13)	Chen L (CHN); L (12–21, 9–21)	Karunaratne (SRI); L (19–21, 22–24)	3	did not advance				
Adam Cwalina; Przemysław Wacha	Men's doubles	Kim G-j / Kim S-r (KOR); L (14–21, 15–21)	Boe / Mogensen (DEN); L (17–21, 17–21)	Ellis / Langridge (GBR); L (18–21, 16–21)	4	—N/a	did not advance			
Robert Mateusiak; Nadieżda Zięba	Mixed doubles	Fischer Nielsen / Pedersen (DEN); L (18–21, 21–23)	Xu C / Ma J (CHN); W (13–21, 21–9, 21–19)	C Adcock / G Adcock (GBR); W (18–21, 27–25, 21–9)	1 Q	—N/a	Chan P S / Goh L Y (MAS); L (17–21, 10–21)	did not advance		

== Boxing ==
Poland has entered two boxers to compete in each of the following weight classes into the Olympic boxing tournament. Tomasz Jabłoński was the only Polish boxer to be selected to the Olympic team with a top two finish of his respective division in the World Series of Boxing. Meanwhile, world no. 1 seed Igor Jakubowski had claimed an Olympic place as the winner and sole recipient of the men's heavyweight division at the 2016 AIBA World Qualifying Tournament in Baku.

Athlete	Event	Round of 32	Round of 16	Quarterfinals	Semifinals	Final	
Athlete	Event	Opposition Result	Opposition Result	Opposition Result	Opposition Result	Opposition Result	Rank
Tomasz Jabłoński	Men's middleweight	Lewis (AUS); L 1–2	did not advance				
Igor Jakubowski	Men's heavyweight	Okolie (GBR); L 0–3	did not advance				

== Canoeing ==
=== Slalom ===
Polish canoeists have qualified a maximum of one boat in each of the following classes through the 2015 ICF Canoe Slalom World Championships. The slalom canoeing team was named to the Polish roster at the conclusion of the 2016 European Canoe Slalom Championships on May 18, 2016.

Athlete	Event	Preliminary						Semifinal		Final	
Athlete	Event	Run 1	Rank	Run 2	Rank	Best	Rank	Time	Rank	Time	Rank
Grzegorz Hedwig	Men's C-1	96.67	3	97.72	6	96.67	7 Q	102.70	12	did not advance	
Marcin Pochwała; Piotr Szczepański	Men's C-2	115.36	9	159.68	11	115.36	11 Q	110.17	4 Q	104.97	5
Maciej Okręglak	Men's K-1	96.73	16	94.44	14	94.44	18	did not advance			
Natalia Pacierpnik	Women's K-1	106.38	5	167.18	19	106.38	10 Q	109.63	11	did not advance	

=== Sprint ===
Polish canoeists have qualified one boat in each of the following events through the 2015 ICF Canoe Sprint World Championships.

Men

Athlete	Event	Heats		Semifinals		Final	
Athlete	Event	Time	Rank	Time	Rank	Time	Rank
Paweł Kaczmarek	K-1 200 m	35.562	6	did not advance			
Tomasz Kaczor	C-1 200 m	42.450	6	did not advance			
Tomasz Kaczor	C-1 1000 m	3:59.928	2 Q	3:59.836	4 FB	3:59.350	9
Rafał Rosolski	K-1 1000 m	3:37.700	4 Q	3:38.379	7 FB	3:39.021	14
Mateusz Kamiński; Michał Kudła	C-2 1000 m	3:44.717	5 Q	3:43.467	4 FB	3:52.964	9

Women

Athlete	Event	Heats		Semifinals		Final	
Athlete	Event	Time	Rank	Time	Rank	Time	Rank
Marta Walczykiewicz	K-1 200 m	40.263	1 Q	40.619	1 FA	40.279	2nd place, silver medalist(s)
Ewelina Wojnarowska	K-1 500 m	1:52.193	2 Q	1:59.458	5 FB	1:58.167	12
Beata Mikołajczyk; Karolina Naja	K-2 500 m	1:41.766	2 Q	1:41.684	1 FA	1:45.207	3rd place, bronze medalist(s)
Marta Walczykiewicz; Beata Mikołajczyk; Karolina Naja; Edyta Dzieniszewska	K-4 500 m	1:33.020	2 Q	1:36.532	4 FB	1:37.658	9

Qualification Legend: FA = Qualify to final A (medal); FB = Qualify to final B (non-medal)

== Cycling ==
=== Road ===
Polish riders qualified for the following quota places in the men's and women's Olympic road race by virtue of their top 15 national finish in the 2015 UCI World Tour (for men) and top 22 in the 2016 UCI World Ranking (for women).

Men

Athlete	Event	Time	Rank
Maciej Bodnar	Road race	did not finish	
Maciej Bodnar	Time trial	1:14:05.89	6
Michał Gołaś	Road race	6:30:05	56
Michał Kwiatkowski	Road race	6:30:05	62
Michał Kwiatkowski	Time trial	1:15:55.49	14
Rafał Majka	Road race	6:10:10	3rd place, bronze medalist(s)

Women

Athlete	Event	Time	Rank
Małgorzata Jasińska	Road race	3:56.34	24
Katarzyna Niewiadoma	Road race	3:51.47	6
Katarzyna Niewiadoma	Time trial	47:47.96	18
Anna Plichta	Road race	4:01.29	41
Anna Plichta	Time trial	47:59.66	19

=== Track ===
Following the completion of the 2016 UCI Track Cycling World Championships, Polish riders have accumulated spots in the men's team sprint, the women's team pursuit, and the women's omnium. As a result of their place in the men's team sprint, Poland has won the right to enter two riders in both the men's sprint and keirin.

The full track cycling team was named to the Polish roster for the Games on July 7, 2016, with Damian Zieliński leading the nation's riders on the velodrome at his third Olympics.

Sprint

Athlete	Event	Qualification		Round 1	Repechage 1	Round 2	Repechage 2	Quarterfinals	Semifinals	Final	
Athlete	Event	Time Speed (km/h)	Rank	Opposition Time Speed (km/h)	Opposition Time Speed (km/h)	Opposition Time Speed (km/h)	Opposition Time Speed (km/h)	Opposition Time Speed (km/h)	Opposition Time Speed (km/h)	Opposition Time Speed (km/h)	Rank
Rafał Sarnecki	Men's sprint	9.980; 72.144	15 Q	Dmitriev (RUS); L	Puerta (COL); Pervis (FRA); L	did not advance					
Damian Zieliński	Men's sprint	9.823; 73.297	7 Q	Eilers (GER); L	Constable (AUS); Kelemen (CZE); L	did not advance					

Team sprint

Athlete	Event	Qualification		Semifinals		Final	
Athlete	Event	Time Speed (km/h)	Rank	Opposition Time Speed (km/h)	Rank	Opposition Time Speed (km/h)	Rank
Krzysztof Maksel; Rafał Sarnecki; Damian Zieliński	Men's team sprint	43.297; 62.359	5 Q	France; L 43.555; 61.990	7	did not advance	

Pursuit

Athlete	Event	Qualification		Semifinals		Final	
Athlete	Event	Time	Rank	Opponent Results	Rank	Opponent Results	Rank
Edyta Jasińska; Justyna Kaczkowska; Daria Pikulik; Natalia Rutkowska; Małgorzata Wojtyra	Women's team pursuit	4:28.988	8 Q	New Zealand; DSQ	8	China; DSQ	8

Keirin

Athlete	Event	1st Round	Repechage	2nd Round	Final
Athlete	Event	Rank	Rank	Rank	Rank
Krzysztof Maksel	Men's keirin	4	1 Q	4 FB	9
Damian Zieliński	Men's keirin	1 Q	Bye	1 FA	6

Omnium

Athlete	Event	Scratch race		Individual pursuit			Elimination race		Time trial			Flying lap			Points race		Total points	Rank
Athlete	Event	Rank	Points	Time	Rank	Points	Rank	Points	Time	Rank	Points	Time	Rank	Points	Points	Rank	Total points	Rank
Daria Pikulik	Women's omnium	10	22	3:39.880	11	20	16	10	36.690	14	14	14.409	8	26	0	15	92	14

=== Mountain biking ===
Polish mountain bikers qualified for two women's quota places into the Olympic cross-country race, as a result of the nation's seventh-place finish in the UCI Olympic Ranking List of May 25, 2016. First-time Olympian Katarzyna Solus-Miśkowicz and Beijing 2008 runner-up Maja Włoszczowska were named to the Polish mountain biking team for the Games on May 30, 2016.

Athlete	Event	Time	Rank
Katarzyna Solus-Miśkowicz	Women's cross-country	did not start	
Maja Włoszczowska	Women's cross-country	1:30:52	2nd place, silver medalist(s)

== Equestrian ==
Poland has received a spare berth freed up by Switzerland to send an eventing rider to the Games, as the next highest-ranked eligible athlete, not yet qualified, outside the group selection in the individual FEI Olympic Rankings.

=== Eventing ===
Athlete	Horse	Event	Dressage		Cross-country			Jumping						Total	
Athlete	Horse	Event	Dressage		Cross-country			Qualifier			Final			Total	
Athlete	Horse	Event	Penalties	Rank	Penalties	Total	Rank	Penalties	Total	Rank	Penalties	Total	Rank	Penalties	Rank
Paweł Spisak	Banderas	Individual	53.60	51	did not finish			did not advance							

== Fencing ==
Polish fencers have qualified a full squad in the women's team sabre by picking up the spare berth freed up by Africa for being the next highest ranking nation in the FIE Olympic Team Rankings. Hanna Łyczbińska secured a spot on the Polish team in the women's foil by virtue of a top two placement from Europe outside the world's top 14 in the FIE Adjusted Official Rankings. The fencing team was officially named to the Olympic roster on June 29, 2016.

Athlete	Event	Round of 64	Round of 32	Round of 16	Quarterfinal	Semifinal	Final / BM	
Athlete	Event	Opposition Score	Opposition Score	Opposition Score	Opposition Score	Opposition Score	Opposition Score	Rank
Hanna Łyczbińska	Women's foil	Bye	Golubytskyi (GER); W 14–9	Di Francisca (ITA); L 6–15	did not advance			
Bogna Jóźwiak	Women's sabre	Baeza (BRA); W 4–2	Velikaya (RUS); L 5–15	did not advance				
Małgorzata Kozaczuk	Women's sabre	Bye	Shen C (CHN); W 15–9	Besbes (TUN); L 12–15	did not advance			
Aleksandra Socha	Women's sabre	Bye	Gulotta (ITA); L 10–15	did not advance				
Bogna Jóźwiak; Małgorzata Kozaczuk; Marta Puda; Aleksandra Socha	Women's team sabre	—N/a			United States; L 43–45	Classification semifinal Mexico; W 45–23	5th place final South Korea; L 41–45	6

== Gymnastics ==
=== Artistic ===
Poland has entered one artistic gymnast into the Olympic competition. This Olympic berth had been awarded to the Polish female gymnast, who participated in the apparatus and all-around events at the Olympic Test Event in Rio de Janeiro.

Women

Athlete	Event	Qualification						Final					
Athlete	Event	Apparatus				Total	Rank	Apparatus				Total	Rank
Athlete	Event	V	UB	BB	F	Total	Rank	V	UB	BB	F	Total	Rank
Katarzyna Jurkowska-Kowalska	Individual	14.466	11.700	12.333	13.300	51.799	49	did not advance					

== Handball ==
Summary

Key:

- ET – After extra time
- P – Match decided by penalty-shootout.

Team	Event	Group Stage						Quarterfinal	Semifinal	Final / BM	
Team	Event	Opposition Score	Opposition Score	Opposition Score	Opposition Score	Opposition Score	Rank	Opposition Score	Opposition Score	Opposition Score	Rank
Poland men's	Men's tournament	Brazil; L 32–34	Germany; L 29–32	Egypt; W 33–25	Sweden; W 25–24	Slovenia; L 20–25	4	Croatia; W 30–27	Denmark; L 28–29^{ET}	Germany; L 25–31	4

=== Men's tournament ===
Poland men's handball team qualified for the Olympics by virtue of a top two finish at the first meet of the Olympic Qualification Tournament in Gdańsk.

Team roster

The following is the Polish roster in the men's handball tournament of the 2016 Summer Olympics.

Head coach: (Spain) Talant Duyshebaev

No.	Pos.	Name	Date of birth (age)	Height	App.	Goals	Club
1	GK	Sławomir Szmal	2 October 1978 (aged 37)	1.90 m	279	2	(Poland) Vive Targi Kielce
3	RB	Krzysztof Lijewski	7 July 1983 (aged 33)	1.98 m	173	409	(Poland) Vive Targi Kielce
5	LW	Mateusz Jachlewski	27 December 1984 (aged 31)	1.84 m	108	236	(Poland) Vive Targi Kielce
6	LW	Przemysław Krajewski	20 January 1987 (aged 29)	1.84 m	69	132	(Poland) Azoty-Puławy
8	LB	Karol Bielecki	23 January 1982 (aged 34)	2.02 m	244	891	(Poland) Vive Targi Kielce
11	LW	Adam Wiśniewski	24 October 1980 (aged 35)	1.92 m	146	189	(Poland) Wisła Płock
13	P	Bartosz Jurecki	31 January 1979 (aged 37)	1.93 m	227	723	(Poland) Chrobry Głogów
15	LB	Michał Jurecki	27 October 1984 (aged 31)	2.02 m	189	528	(Poland) Vive Targi Kielce
16	GK	Piotr Wyszomirski	6 January 1988 (aged 28)	1.93 m	104	0	(Germany) TBV Lemgo
20	CB	Mariusz Jurkiewicz	3 February 1982 (aged 34)	1.98 m	150	257	(Poland) Vive Targi Kielce
23	P	Kamil Syprzak	23 July 1991 (aged 25)	2.08 m	87	164	(Spain) Barcelona
26	RW	Michał Daszek	27 June 1992 (aged 24)	1.80 m	56	110	(Poland) Wisła Płock
28	CB	Łukasz Gierak	22 June 1988 (aged 28)	1.92 m	6	6	(Poland) Pogoń Szczecin
35	P	Mateusz Kus	14 July 1987 (aged 29)	2.00 m	5	4	(Poland) Vive Targi Kielce
45	RB	Michał Szyba	18 March 1988 (aged 28)	1.96 m	57	82	(Slovenia) Gorenje Velenje

Group play

Pos	Team	Pld	W	D	L	GF	GA	GD	Pts	Qualification
1	Germany	5	4	0	1	153	141	+12	8 (Note: Slovenia 25–28 Germany)	Quarter-finals
2	Slovenia	5	4	0	1	137	126	+11	8	Quarter-finals
3	Brazil (H)	5	2	1	2	141	150	−9	5	Quarter-finals
4	Poland	5	2	0	3	139	140	−1	4	Quarter-finals
5	Egypt	5	1	1	3	129	143	−14	3	
6	Sweden	5	1	0	4	132	131	+1	2	

Source: IHF
Rules for classification: 1) Points; 2) Head-to-head points; 3) Head-to-head goal difference; 4) Head-to-head goals scored; 5) Goal difference; 6) Goals scored; 7) Draw.
(H) Hosts
Notes:

7 August 2016; 16:40	Poland	32–34	Brazil	Future Arena, Rio de Janeiro; Referees: Nachevski, Nikolov (MKD)
7 August 2016; 16:40	Daszek 8	(13–16)	Toledo 7	Future Arena, Rio de Janeiro; Referees: Nachevski, Nikolov (MKD)
7 August 2016; 16:40	4× (yellow card) 5× (suspension)	Report	3× (yellow card) 6× (suspension)	Future Arena, Rio de Janeiro; Referees: Nachevski, Nikolov (MKD)

9 August 2016; 11:30	Germany	32–29	Poland	Future Arena, Rio de Janeiro; Referees: Lopéz, Ramírez (ESP)
9 August 2016; 11:30	three players 5	(16–14)	Bielecki 10	Future Arena, Rio de Janeiro; Referees: Lopéz, Ramírez (ESP)
9 August 2016; 11:30	4× (yellow card) 6× (suspension) 1× (red card)	Report	3× (yellow card) 5× (suspension)	Future Arena, Rio de Janeiro; Referees: Lopéz, Ramírez (ESP)

11 August 2016; 11:30	Poland	33–25	Egypt	Future Arena, Rio de Janeiro; Referees: Santos, Fonseca (POR)
11 August 2016; 11:30	Daszek 6	(16–10)	Eissa 6	Future Arena, Rio de Janeiro; Referees: Santos, Fonseca (POR)
11 August 2016; 11:30	4× (yellow card) 7× (suspension)	Report	3× (yellow card) 6× (suspension) 1× (red card)	Future Arena, Rio de Janeiro; Referees: Santos, Fonseca (POR)

13 August 2016; 19:50	Sweden	24–25	Poland	Future Arena, Rio de Janeiro; Referees: Geipel, Helbig (GER)
13 August 2016; 19:50	Stenmalm 8	(13–12)	Bielecki 8	Future Arena, Rio de Janeiro; Referees: Geipel, Helbig (GER)
13 August 2016; 19:50	3× (yellow card) 2× (suspension)	Report	4× (yellow card) 8× (suspension)	Future Arena, Rio de Janeiro; Referees: Geipel, Helbig (GER)

15 August 2016; 09:30	Poland	20–25	Slovenia	Future Arena, Rio de Janeiro; Referees: Horáček, Novotný (CZE)
15 August 2016; 09:30	Bielecki 4	(13–13)	Zarabec 7	Future Arena, Rio de Janeiro; Referees: Horáček, Novotný (CZE)
15 August 2016; 09:30	2× (yellow card) 5× (suspension) 1× (red card)	Report	2× (yellow card) 8× (suspension)	Future Arena, Rio de Janeiro; Referees: Horáček, Novotný (CZE)

Quarterfinal

17 August 2016; 20:30	Croatia	27–30	Poland	Future Arena, Rio de Janeiro; Referees: Geipel, Helbig (GER)
17 August 2016; 20:30	Čupić, Stepančić 7	(14–18)	Bielecki 12	Future Arena, Rio de Janeiro; Referees: Geipel, Helbig (GER)
17 August 2016; 20:30	4× (yellow card) 2× (suspension) 1× (red card)	Report	2× (yellow card) 2× (suspension)	Future Arena, Rio de Janeiro; Referees: Geipel, Helbig (GER)

Semifinal

19 August 2016
20:30
Poland
28–29 (ET)
Denmark
Future Arena, Rio de Janeiro
Referees: Horáček, Novotný (CZE)
Bielecki 7
(15–16)
M. Hansen 10
4× (yellow card) 3× (suspension)
Report
3× (yellow card) 3× (suspension)

FT: 25–25 ET: 3–4

Bronze medal match

21 August 2016; 10:30	Poland	25–31	Germany	Future Arena, Rio de Janeiro; Referees: Horáček, Novotný (CZE)
21 August 2016; 10:30	Krajewski, Lijewski 5	(13–17)	Reichmann 7	Future Arena, Rio de Janeiro; Referees: Horáček, Novotný (CZE)
21 August 2016; 10:30	1× (yellow card) 5× (suspension)	Report	3× (yellow card) 5× (suspension)	Future Arena, Rio de Janeiro; Referees: Horáček, Novotný (CZE)

== Judo ==
Poland has qualified a total of eight judokas for each of the following weight classes at the Games. Maciej Sarnacki, along with London 2012 Olympians Katarzyna Kłys and Daria Pogorzelec, were ranked among the top 22 eligible judokas for men and top 14 for women in the IJF World Ranking List of May 30, 2016, while Arleta Podolak at women's lightweight (57 kg) earned a continental quota spot from the European region as the highest-ranked Polish judoka outside of direct qualifying position.

Athlete	Event	Round of 64	Round of 32	Round of 16	Quarterfinals	Semifinals	Repechage	Final / BM	
Athlete	Event	Opposition Result	Opposition Result	Opposition Result	Opposition Result	Opposition Result	Opposition Result	Opposition Result	Rank
Maciej Sarnacki	Men's +100 kg	Bye	Jónsson (ISL); W 100–000	Sasson (ISR); L 000–010	did not advance				
Arleta Podolak	Women's −57 kg	Bye	Lien C-l (TPE); L 000–100	did not advance					
Katarzyna Kłys	Women's −70 kg	—N/a	Matniyazova (UZB); W 001–000	Bernabéu (ESP); L 000–000 S	did not advance				
Daria Pogorzelec	Women's −78 kg	—N/a	Atangana (CMR); W 000–000 S	Malzahn (GER); L 000–000 S	did not advance				

== Modern pentathlon ==
Poland has qualified a total of three modern pentathletes for the following events at the Games. Oktawia Nowacka and London 2012 Olympian Szymon Staśkiewicz secured their selection in the men's and women's event, respectively, by virtue of a top eight individual finish at the European Championships, while Anna Maliszewska was ranked among the top 10 modern pentathletes, not yet qualified, based on the UIPM World Rankings as of June 1, 2016.

Athlete	Event	Fencing (épée one touch)				Swimming (200 m freestyle)			Riding (show jumping)			Combined: shooting/running (10 m air pistol)/(3200 m)			Total points	Final rank
Athlete	Event	RR	BR	Rank	MP points	Time	Rank	MP points	Penalties	Rank	MP points	Time	Rank	MP Points	Total points	Final rank
Szymon Staśkiewicz	Men's	21–14	1	5	227	2:10.16	35	310	42	30	258	11:45.88	24	595	1390	27
Anna Maliszewska	Women's	16–19	4	21	200	2:20.30	25	280	18	20	282	13:01.21	19	519	1281	19
Oktawia Nowacka	Women's	27–8	1	1	264	2:16.67	16	290	7	9	293	13:18.50	25	502	1349	3rd place, bronze medalist(s)

== Rowing ==
Poland has qualified a total of eight boats for each of the following rowing classes into the Olympic regatta. Six rowing crews had confirmed Olympic places for their boats at the 2015 FISA World Championships in Lac d'Aiguebelette, France, while rowers competing in men's eight and women's pair were further added to the Polish roster with their top four finish at the 2016 European & Final Qualification Regatta in Lucerne, Switzerland.

Men

Athlete	Event	Heats		Repechage		Quarterfinals		Semifinals		Final	
Athlete	Event	Time	Rank	Time	Rank	Time	Rank	Time	Rank	Time	Rank
Natan Węgrzycki-Szymczyk	Single sculls	7:12.43	2 QF	Bye		6:53.52	3 SA/B	7:15.61	6 FB	6:47.95	7
Artur Mikołajczewski; Miłosz Jankowski	Lightweight double sculls	6:27.70	2 SA/B	Bye		—N/a		6:40.23	3 FA	6:42.00	6
Mateusz Biskup; Wiktor Chabel; Dariusz Radosz; Mirosław Ziętarski	Quadruple sculls	5:51.28	2 FA	Bye		—N/a				6:12.09	4
Krystian Aranowski; Marcin Brzeziński; Mikołaj Burda; Robert Fuchs; Piotr Juszczak; Zbigniew Schodowski; Michał Szpakowski; Mateusz Wilangowski; Daniel Trojanowski (cox)	Eight	5:42.32	3 R	5:59.22	4 FA	—N/a				5:34.62	5

Women

Athlete	Event	Heats		Repechage		Semifinals		Final	
Athlete	Event	Time	Rank	Time	Rank	Time	Rank	Time	Rank
Anna Wierzbowska; Maria Wierzbowska	Pair	7:12.82	3 SA/B	Bye		7:39.12	5 FB	7:21.53	10
Magdalena Fularczyk; Natalia Madaj	Double sculls	7:16.16	1 SA/B	Bye		6:50.63	1 FA	7:40.10	1st place, gold medalist(s)
Weronika Deresz; Martyna Mikołajczak	Lightweight double sculls	7:05.02	2 SA/B	Bye		7:22.06	5 FB	7:24.34	7
Monika Ciaciuch; Agnieszka Kobus; Joanna Leszczyńska; Maria Springwald	Quadruple sculls	6:33.43	2 R	6:25.49	2 FA	—N/a		6:50.86	3rd place, bronze medalist(s)

Qualification Legend: FA=Final A (medal); FB=Final B (non-medal); FC=Final C (non-medal); FD=Final D (non-medal); FE=Final E (non-medal); FF=Final F (non-medal); SA/B=Semifinals A/B; SC/D=Semifinals C/D; SE/F=Semifinals E/F; QF=Quarterfinals; R=Repechage

== Sailing ==
Polish sailors have qualified one boat in each of the following classes through the 2014 ISAF Sailing World Championships, the individual fleet Worlds, and European qualifying regattas.

Men

Athlete	Event	Race													Net points	Final rank
Athlete	Event	1	2	3	4	5	6	7	8	9	10	11	12	M*	Net points	Final rank
Piotr Myszka	RS:X	4	5	5	2	2	3	12	2	6	13	~~16~~	16	9	88	4
Kacper Ziemiński	Laser	34	28	6	~~47~~	3	5	20	12	22	10	—N/a		EL	140	18
Paweł Kołodziński; Łukasz Przybytek	49er	2	13	9	9	5	9.3	~~18~~	11	7	16	18	9	5	118.3	8

Women

Athlete	Event	Race													Net points	Final rank
Athlete	Event	1	2	3	4	5	6	7	8	9	10	11	12	M*	Net points	Final rank
Małgorzata Białecka	RS:X	13	21	13	23	12	6	~~DNF~~	14	9	11	13	18	EL	153	14
Irmina Gliszczyńska; Agnieszka Skrzypulec	470	10	14	9	~~21~~	3	14	19	12	7	8	—N/a		5	106	10

M = Medal race; EL = Eliminated – did not advance into the medal race

== Shooting ==
Polish shooters have achieved quota places for the following events by virtue of their best finishes at the 2015 ISSF World Cup series, and the European Championships, as long as they obtained a minimum qualifying score (MQS) as of March 31, 2016. The entire shooting squad was named to the Polish roster on July 5, 2016, with rifle markswomen Agnieszka Nagay and London 2012 silver medalist Sylwia Bogacka returning for their fourth Olympics.

Athlete	Event	Qualification		Semifinal		Final	
Athlete	Event	Points	Rank	Points	Rank	Points	Rank
Piotr Daniluk	Men's 10 m air pistol	567	41	—N/a		did not advance	
Piotr Daniluk	Men's 25 m rapid fire pistol	567	20	—N/a		did not advance	
Sylwia Bogacka	Women's 10 m air rifle	409.1	40	—N/a		did not advance	
Sylwia Bogacka	Women's 50 m rifle 3 positions	577	23	—N/a		did not advance	
Klaudia Breś	Women's 10 m air pistol	379	23	—N/a		did not advance	
Klaudia Breś	Women's 25 m pistol	578	15	did not advance			
Aleksandra Jarmolińska	Women's skeet	68	12	did not advance			
Agnieszka Nagay	Women's 10 m air rifle	412.8	29	—N/a		did not advance	
Agnieszka Nagay	Women's 50 m rifle 3 positions	578	16	—N/a		did not advance	

Qualification Legend: Q = Qualify for the next round; q = Qualify for the bronze medal (shotgun)

== Swimming ==
Polish swimmers have so far achieved qualifying standards in the following events (up to a maximum of 2 swimmers in each event at the Olympic Qualifying Time (OQT), and potentially 1 at the Olympic Selection Time (OST)): To assure their selection to the Olympic team, swimmers must attain the Olympic qualifying cut in each of the individual events at the 2015 World Championships and at the 2016 Polish Championships & Olympic Trials in Szczecin (May 27 to 30).

Men

Athlete	Event	Heat		Semifinal		Final	
Athlete	Event	Time	Rank	Time	Rank	Time	Rank
Konrad Czerniak	100 m butterfly	51.81	=10 Q	51.80	10	did not advance	
Paweł Juraszek	50 m freestyle	22.50	35	did not advance			
Radosław Kawęcki	100 m backstroke	54.39	23	did not advance			
Radosław Kawęcki	200 m backstroke	1:57.61	17	did not advance			
Paweł Korzeniowski	100 m butterfly	53.71	33	did not advance			
Kacper Majchrzak	200 m freestyle	1:47.12	15 Q	1:46.30 NR	10	did not advance	
Tomasz Polewka	100 m backstroke	54.52	26	did not advance			
Mateusz Sawrymowicz	1500 m freestyle	15:26.33	33	—N/a		did not advance	
Marcin Stolarski	100 m breaststroke	1:01.06	29	did not advance			
Jan Świtkowski	200 m butterfly	1:56.73	17	did not advance			
Wojciech Wojdak	400 m freestyle	3:48.87	23	—N/a		did not advance	
Wojciech Wojdak	1500 m freestyle	15:13.18	28	—N/a		did not advance	
Filip Wypych	50 m freestyle	22.23	21	did not advance			
Filip Zaborowski	400 m freestyle	3:49.84	28	—N/a		did not advance	
Konrad Czerniak; Paweł Korzeniowski; Kacper Majchrzak; Jan Świtkowski	4 × 100 m freestyle relay	3:15.52	13	—N/a		did not advance	
Kacper Klich; Paweł Korzeniowski; Kacper Majchrzak; Jan Świtkowski; Paweł Werner	4 × 200 m freestyle relay	7:11.11	10	—N/a		did not advance	
Radosław Kawęcki; Marcin Stolarski; Konrad Czerniak; Kacper Majchrzak; Paweł Korzeniowski*	4 × 100 m medley relay	3:35.18	12	—N/a		did not advance	

Women

Athlete	Event	Heat		Semifinal		Final	
Athlete	Event	Time	Rank	Time	Rank	Time	Rank
Katarzyna Baranowska	200 m individual medley	2:19.03	39	did not advance			
Anna Dowgiert	50 m freestyle	25.54	37	did not advance			
Alicja Tchórz	100 m backstroke	1:01.31	21	did not advance			
Alicja Tchórz	200 m backstroke	2:11.40	20	did not advance			
Aleksandra Urbańczyk	50 m freestyle	25.28	29	did not advance			
Katarzyna Wilk	100 m freestyle	55.44	29	did not advance			
Joanna Zachoszcz	10 km open water	—N/a				1:59:20.4	22
Anna Dowgiert; Alicja Tchórz; Aleksandra Urbańczyk; Katarzyna Wilk	4 × 100 m freestyle relay	3:41.43	15	—N/a		did not advance	

== Table tennis ==
Poland has fielded a team of six athletes into the table tennis competition at the Games. 2012 Olympian Li Qian secured one of ten available Olympic spots in the women's singles by winning the group final match at the European Qualification Tournament in Halmstad, Sweden. London 2012 Olympians Wang Zengyi and Katarzyna Grzybowska, along with Jakub Dyjas, were automatically selected among the top 22 eligible players in their respective singles events based on the ITTF Olympic Rankings.

Daniel Górak and Paralympian Natalia Partyka were each awarded the third spot to build the men's and women's teams for the Games by virtue of the top 10 national finish in the ITTF Olympic Rankings.

Men

Athlete	Event	Preliminary	Round 1	Round 2	Round 3	Round of 16	Quarterfinals	Semifinals	Final / BM	
Athlete	Event	Opposition Result	Opposition Result	Opposition Result	Opposition Result	Opposition Result	Opposition Result	Opposition Result	Opposition Result	Rank
Jakub Dyjas	Singles	Bye	Aguirre (PAR); W 4–0	Shibaev (RUS); L 0–4	did not advance					
Wang Zengyi	Singles	Bye		Tokič (SLO); L 2–4	did not advance					
Jakub Dyjas; Daniel Górak; Wang Zengyi	Team	—N/a				Japan; L 2–3	did not advance			

Women

Athlete	Event	Preliminary	Round 1	Round 2	Round 3	Round of 16	Quarterfinals	Semifinals	Final / BM	
Athlete	Event	Opposition Result	Opposition Result	Opposition Result	Opposition Result	Opposition Result	Opposition Result	Opposition Result	Opposition Result	Rank
Katarzyna Grzybowska	Singles	Bye	Batra (IND); W 4–2	Kim S-i (PRK); L 0–4	did not advance					
Li Qian	Singles	Bye		Dodean (ROU); L 1–4	did not advance					
Katarzyna Grzybowska; Li Qian; Natalia Partyka	Team	—N/a				Japan; L 0–3	did not advance			

== Taekwondo ==
Poland entered two athletes into the taekwondo competition at the Olympics. Piotr Paziński and 2015 European Games silver medalist Karol Robak secured spots in the men's lightweight (68 kg) and welterweight category (80 kg) respectively by virtue of their top two finish at the 2016 European Qualification Tournament in Istanbul, Turkey.

Athlete	Event	Round of 16	Quarterfinals	Semifinals	Repechage	Final / BM	
Athlete	Event	Opposition Result	Opposition Result	Opposition Result	Opposition Result	Opposition Result	Rank
Karol Robak	Men's −68 kg	Dièye (SEN); W 15–12	Achab (BEL); L 7–9	did not advance			
Piotr Paziński	Men's −80 kg	Cisse (CIV); L 2–8	did not advance		Güleç (GER); W 6–5	Beigi (AZE); L 0–12 PTG	5

== Tennis ==
Poland has entered seven tennis players (three men and four women) into the Olympic tournament. London 2012 Olympian Agnieszka Radwańska (world no. 3) qualified directly for the women's singles as one of the top 56 eligible players in the WTA World Rankings, while Jerzy Janowicz (world no. 120) had claimed one of six ITF Olympic men's singles places, as Poland's top-ranked tennis player outside of direct qualifying position in the ATP World Rankings as of June 6, 2016. Going to his fourth straight Games, Marcin Matkowski teamed up his new partner Łukasz Kubot to compete in the men's doubles, and were subsequently added to the Polish tennis team by virtue of their combined ATP ranking.

Due to the withdrawal of several tennis players from the Games, Magda Linette, along with Klaudia Jans-Ignacik and Paula Kania received spare ITF Olympic places to compete in the women's singles and doubles, respectively.

Men

Athlete	Event	Round of 64	Round of 32	Round of 16	Quarterfinals	Semifinals	Final / BM	
Athlete	Event	Opposition Score	Opposition Score	Opposition Score	Opposition Score	Opposition Score	Opposition Score	Rank
Jerzy Janowicz	Singles	Müller (LUX); L 7–5, 1–6, 6–7^{(10–12)}	did not advance					
Łukasz Kubot; Marcin Matkowski	Doubles	—N/a	Bopanna / Paes (IND); W 6–4, 7–6^{(8–6)}	Bautista Agut / Ferrer (ESP); L 3–6, 6–7^{(5–7)}	did not advance			

Women

Athlete	Event	Round of 64	Round of 32	Round of 16	Quarterfinals	Semifinals	Final / BM	
Athlete	Event	Opposition Score	Opposition Score	Opposition Score	Opposition Score	Opposition Score	Opposition Score	Rank
Magda Linette	Singles	Pavlyuchenkova (RUS); L 0–6, 3–6	did not advance					
Agnieszka Radwańska	Singles	Zheng SS (CHN); L 4–6, 5–7	did not advance					
Klaudia Jans-Ignacik; Paula Kania	Doubles	—N/a	Bouchard / Dabrowski (CAN); L 6–4, 5–7, 3–6	did not advance				

Mixed

Athlete	Event	Round of 16	Quarterfinals	Semifinals	Final / BM	
Athlete	Event	Opposition Score	Opposition Score	Opposition Score	Opposition Score	Rank
Agnieszka Radwańska; Łukasz Kubot	Doubles	Begu / Tecău (ROU); L 6–4, 6–7^{(1–7)}, [8–10]	did not advance			

== Triathlon ==
Poland has entered one triathlete to compete at the Games. London 2012 Olympian Agnieszka Jerzyk was ranked among the top 40 eligible triathletes in the women's event based on the ITU Olympic Qualification List as of May 15, 2016.

Athlete	Event	Swim (1.5 km)	Trans 1	Bike (40 km)	Trans 2	Run (10 km)	Total Time	Rank
Agnieszka Jerzyk	Women's	19:50	0:54	1:03:59	0:40	36:04	2:01:27	22

== Volleyball ==
=== Beach ===
Three Polish beach volleyball teams (two men's pairs and one women's pair) qualified directly for the Olympics by virtue of their nation's top 15 placement in the FIVB Olympic Rankings as of June 13, 2016.

Athlete	Event	Preliminary round	Standing	Round of 16	Quarterfinals	Semifinals	Final / BM	
Athlete	Event	Opposition Score	Standing	Opposition Score	Opposition Score	Opposition Score	Opposition Score	Rank
Grzegorz Fijałek; Mariusz Prudel	Men's	Pool E Krasilnikov – Semenov (RUS); L 0 – 2 (14–21, 13–21); Nummerdor – Varenhorst (NED); L 1 – 2 (17–21, 21–19, 9–15); E Grimalt – M Grimalt (CHI); W 2 – 1 (21–13, 16–21, 15–9); Lucky Losers; Saxton – Schalk (CAN); L 0 – 2 (19–21. 18–21)	3	did not advance				
Piotr Kantor; Bartosz Łosiak	Men's	Pool B Böckermann – Flüggen (GER); W 2 – 0 (21–11, 23–21); Barsouk – Liamin (RUS); L 0 – 2 (14–21, 17–21); Brouwer – Meeuwsen (NED); L 0 – 2 (19–21, 19–21); Lucky Losers; Lupo – Nicolai (ITA); L 1 – 2 (12–21, 21–15, 13–15)	3	did not advance				
Monika Brzostek; Kinga Kołosińska	Women's	Pool A Fendrick – Sweat (USA); W 2 – 1 (14–21, 21–13, 15–7); Birlova – Ukolova (RUS); W 2 – 0 (21–19, 21–18); Antunes – França (BRA); L 0 – 2 (10–21, 15–21)	2 Q	Bawden – Clancy (AUS); L 1 – 2 (21–15, 16–21, 11–15)	did not advance			

=== Indoor ===
==== Men's tournament ====
Poland men's volleyball team qualified for the Olympics by virtue of a top three national finish at the first meet of the World Olympic Qualifying Tournament in Tokyo, Japan.

Team roster

The following is the Poland roster in the men's volleyball tournament of the 2016 Summer Olympics.

Head coach: (France) Stéphane Antiga

No.	Name	Date of birth	Height	Weight	Spike	Block	2015–16 club
1	Piotr Nowakowski	18 December 1987	2.05 m (6 ft 9 in)	90 kg (200 lb)	355 cm (140 in)	340 cm (130 in)	(Poland) Asseco Resovia Rzeszów
3	Dawid Konarski	31 August 1989	1.98 m (6 ft 6 in)	93 kg (205 lb)	353 cm (139 in)	320 cm (130 in)	(Poland) ZAKSA Kędzierzyn-Koźle
6	Bartosz Kurek	29 August 1988	2.05 m (6 ft 9 in)	87 kg (192 lb)	352 cm (139 in)	326 cm (128 in)	(Poland) Asseco Resovia Rzeszów
7	Karol Kłos	8 August 1989	2.01 m (6 ft 7 in)	87 kg (192 lb)	357 cm (141 in)	326 cm (128 in)	(Poland) PGE Skra Bełchatów
11	Fabian Drzyzga	3 January 1990	1.96 m (6 ft 5 in)	90 kg (200 lb)	325 cm (128 in)	304 cm (120 in)	(Poland) Asseco Resovia Rzeszów
12	Grzegorz Łomacz	1 October 1987	1.87 m (6 ft 2 in)	80 kg (180 lb)	335 cm (132 in)	315 cm (124 in)	(Poland) Cuprum Lubin
13	Michał Kubiak (c)	23 February 1988	1.91 m (6 ft 3 in)	80 kg (180 lb)	328 cm (129 in)	312 cm (123 in)	(Turkey) Halkbank Ankara
17	Paweł Zatorski (L)	21 June 1990	1.84 m (6 ft 0 in)	73 kg (161 lb)	328 cm (129 in)	304 cm (120 in)	(Poland) ZAKSA Kędzierzyn-Koźle
20	Mateusz Mika	21 January 1991	2.06 m (6 ft 9 in)	86 kg (190 lb)	352 cm (139 in)	320 cm (130 in)	(Poland) Lotos Trefl Gdańsk
21	Rafał Buszek	28 April 1987	1.94 m (6 ft 4 in)	81 kg (179 lb)	345 cm (136 in)	327 cm (129 in)	(Poland) ZAKSA Kędzierzyn-Koźle
22	Bartosz Bednorz	25 July 1994	2.01 m (6 ft 7 in)	84 kg (185 lb)	350 cm (140 in)	315 cm (124 in)	(Poland) Indykpol AZS Olsztyn
23	Mateusz Bieniek	5 April 1994	2.10 m (6 ft 11 in)	98 kg (216 lb)	351 cm (138 in)	326 cm (128 in)	(Poland) Effector Kielce

Group play

Pos	Team	Pld	W	L	Pts	SW	SL	SR	SPW	SPL	SPR	Qualification
1	Argentina	5	4	1	12	12	4	3.000	394	335	1.176	Quarterfinals
2	Poland	5	4	1	12	14	5	2.800	447	389	1.149	Quarterfinals
3	Russia	5	4	1	11	13	6	2.167	432	367	1.177	Quarterfinals
4	Iran	5	2	3	7	8	9	0.889	389	392	0.992	Quarterfinals
5	Egypt	5	1	4	3	3	12	0.250	286	362	0.790	
6	Cuba	5	0	5	0	1	15	0.067	300	403	0.744	

Source: FIVB
Rules for classification: Tiebreakers

7 August 2016; 15:00	Poland	3–0	Egypt	Ginásio do Maracanãzinho, Rio de Janeiro; Attendance: 5,658; Referees: Juraj Mokrý (SVK), Susana Rodríguez (ESP)
7 August 2016; 15:00	(25–18, 25–20, 25–17); Results Statistics			Ginásio do Maracanãzinho, Rio de Janeiro; Attendance: 5,658; Referees: Juraj Mokrý (SVK), Susana Rodríguez (ESP)

9 August 2016; 17:35	Poland	3–2	Iran	Ginásio do Maracanãzinho, Rio de Janeiro; Attendance: 7,227; Referees: Paulo Turci (BRA), Susana Rodríguez (ESP)
9 August 2016; 17:35	(25–17, 25–23, 23–25, 20–25, 18–16); Results Statistics			Ginásio do Maracanãzinho, Rio de Janeiro; Attendance: 7,227; Referees: Paulo Turci (BRA), Susana Rodríguez (ESP)

11 August 2016; 15:00	Poland	3–0	Argentina	Ginásio do Maracanãzinho, Rio de Janeiro; Attendance: 6,972; Referees: Denny Cespedes (DOM), Rogerio Espicalsky (BRA)
11 August 2016; 15:00	(25–21, 25–19, 37–35); Results Statistics			Ginásio do Maracanãzinho, Rio de Janeiro; Attendance: 6,972; Referees: Denny Cespedes (DOM), Rogerio Espicalsky (BRA)

13 August 2016; 15:00	Poland	2–3	Russia	Ginásio do Maracanãzinho, Rio de Janeiro; Attendance: 7,239; Referees: Fabrizio Pasquali (ITA), Juraj Mokrý (SVK)
13 August 2016; 15:00	(18–25, 25–16, 18–25, 25–22, 13–15); Results Statistics			Ginásio do Maracanãzinho, Rio de Janeiro; Attendance: 7,239; Referees: Fabrizio Pasquali (ITA), Juraj Mokrý (SVK)

15 August 2016; 17:05	Poland	3–0	Cuba	Ginásio do Maracanãzinho, Rio de Janeiro; Attendance: 8,175; Referees: Vladimir Simonović (SRB), Ibrahim Al-Naama (QAT)
15 August 2016; 17:05	(25–18, 25–15, 25–17); Results Statistics			Ginásio do Maracanãzinho, Rio de Janeiro; Attendance: 8,175; Referees: Vladimir Simonović (SRB), Ibrahim Al-Naama (QAT)

Quarterfinal

17 August 2016; 14:00	United States	3–0	Poland	Ginásio do Maracanãzinho, Rio de Janeiro; Attendance: 8,278; Referees: Fabrizio Pasquali (ITA), Andrey Zenovich (RUS)
17 August 2016; 14:00	(25–23, 25–22, 25–20); Results Statistics			Ginásio do Maracanãzinho, Rio de Janeiro; Attendance: 8,278; Referees: Fabrizio Pasquali (ITA), Andrey Zenovich (RUS)

== Weightlifting ==
Polish weightlifters have qualified four men's quota places for the Rio Olympics based on their combined team standing by points at the 2014 and 2015 IWF World Championships. A single women's Olympic spot had been added to the Polish roster by virtue of a top six national finish at the 2016 European Championships. The team must allocate these places to individual athletes by June 20, 2016.

Athlete	Event	Snatch		Clean & Jerk		Total	Rank
Athlete	Event	Result	Rank	Result	Rank	Total	Rank
Adrian Zieliński	Men's −94 kg	Disqualified (due to doping case)					
Tomasz Zieliński	Men's −94 kg	Disqualified (due to doping case)					
Bartłomiej Bonk	Men's −105 kg	185	7	~~218~~	DNF	185	DNF
Arkadiusz Michalski	Men's −105 kg	179	11	221	5	400	7
Patrycja Piechowiak	Women's −69 kg	101	9	—	—	101	DNF

== Wrestling ==
Poland has qualified a total of eight wrestlers for each of the following weight classes into the Olympic tournament. Three of them had booked Olympic spots with their semifinal triumphs at the 2016 European Qualification Tournament. Meanwhile, the other half of the Polish roster had claimed the remaining Olympic slots in separate World Qualification Tournaments; two of them each in the men's freestyle 86 & 125 kg at the initial meet in Ulaanbaatar, and two more in the women's freestyle 48 & 63 kg at the final meet in Istanbul.

On May 11, 2016, United World Wrestling decided to revoke an Olympic license from Poland in men's freestyle 65 kg, due to doping violations at the European Qualification Tournament, but the license was reinstated two months later, following the recent meldonium guidelines released by IOC and WADA.

Key:

- VT – Victory by fall.
- PP – Decision by points – the loser with technical points.
- PO – Decision by points – the loser without technical points.
- ST – Great superiority – the loser without technical points and a margin of victory of at least 8 (Greco-Roman) or 10 (freestyle) points.

Men's freestyle

Athlete	Event	Qualification	Round of 16	Quarterfinal	Semifinal	Repechage 1	Repechage 2	Final / BM	
Athlete	Event	Opposition Result	Opposition Result	Opposition Result	Opposition Result	Opposition Result	Opposition Result	Opposition Result	Rank
Magomedmurad Gadzhiev	−65 kg	Bye	Molinaro (USA); L 1–3 ^{PP}	did not advance					16
Zbigniew Baranowski	−86 kg	Bye	Aminashvili (GEO); W 3–1 ^{PP}	Sharifov (AZE); L 0–3 ^{PO}	did not advance				10
Radosław Baran	−97 kg	Gazyumov (AZE); L 0–3 ^{PO}	did not advance			Yazdani (IRI); L 1–3 ^{PP}	did not advance		13
Robert Baran	−125 kg	Bye	Lazarev (KGZ); W 3–1 ^{PP}	Dlagnev (USA); L 1–3 ^{PP}	did not advance				11

Women's freestyle

Athlete	Event	Qualification	Round of 16	Quarterfinal	Semifinal	Repechage 1	Repechage 2	Final / BM	
Athlete	Event	Opposition Result	Opposition Result	Opposition Result	Opposition Result	Opposition Result	Opposition Result	Opposition Result	Rank
Iwona Matkowska	−48 kg	Bye	Genesis (NGR); W 3–0 ^{PO}	Stadnik (AZE); L 0–4 ^{ST}	Did not advance	Bye	Bermúdez (ARG); L 1–3 ^{PP}	Did not advance	7
Katarzyna Krawczyk	−53 kg	Bye	Erdenechimeg (MGL); W 3–1 ^{PP}	S Mattsson (SWE); L 1–3 ^{PP}	did not advance				9
Monika Michalik	−63 kg	Bye	Kawai (JPN); L 0–3 ^{PO}	did not advance		Bye	Grigorjeva (LAT); W 3–1 ^{PP}	Trazhukova (RUS); W 3–1 ^{PP}	3rd place, bronze medalist(s)
Agnieszka Wieszczek	−69 kg	Tosun (TUR); L 0–3 ^{PO}	did not advance						16

== See also ==
- Poland at the 2016 Summer Paralympics
