= 2016 World Rowing Junior Championships =

- Venue: Willem-Alexander Baan
- Location: Rotterdam, Netherlands
- Dates: 24–28 August

The 50th World Rowing Junior Championships were held from 24 to 28 August 2016 at the Willem-Alexander Baan in Rotterdam, Netherlands in conjunction with the World Rowing Championships and the World Rowing U23 Championships. All rowers are age 18 or younger.

== Medal summary ==
=== Men's events ===
Event	Gold		Silver		Bronze	
Single scull (JM1x)	Armandas Kelmelis; Lithuania	07:09.72	Anton Finger; Germany	07:13.25	Lucas Verthein; Brazil	07:15.90
Coxless pair (JM2-)	Greece; Ioannis Kalandaridis; Nino Nikolaidis	06:32.51	Germany; Jan Hennecke; Marcus Elster	06:35.00	South Africa; Sandro Torrente; Alexander Julicher	06:44.82
Double scull (JM2x)	New Zealand; Lenny Jenkins; Jack Lopas	06:26.19	Germany; Konstantin Nowitzki; Henry Schwinde	06:28.16	Italy; Emanuele Giarri; Marcello Caldonazzo	06:28.84
Coxless four (JM4-)	Romania; Ștefan Constantin Berariu; Cosmin Pascari; Mihaita-Vasile Tiganescu; Constantin Cristi Hîrgau	05:58.85	Great Britain; Oscar Lindsay; James Plaut; Oswald Stocker; Freddie Davidson	06:03.71	Germany; Niclas Junkes; Leon Münch; Simon Klose; Benjamin Leibelt	06:09.30
Coxed four (JM4+)	Italy; Lapo Londi; Andrea Panizza; Antonio Cascone; Andrea Benetti; Francesco Tassia	06:15.97	Germany; Jan Harder; Oliver Peikert; Tom Hinrichs; Lasse Grimmer; Max Schwartzkopff	06:18.16	United States; Kenneth Copeland; Pieter Quinton; Kyle Fram; Harrison Burke; Ethan Ruiz	06:20.58
Quad scull (JM4x)	Czech Republic; Jan Fleissner; Jan Cincibuch; Eduard Bezděk; Jan Zavadil	05:56.77	Germany; Malte Engelbrecht; Matthias Fischer; Jan Berend; Simon Schlott	05:58.89	United States; David Orner; Andrew Le Roux; Zachary Skypeck; Clark Dean	06:00.32
Eight (JM8+)	Germany; Paul Gralla; Niklas Hauser; Alexander von Schwerdtner; Frederik Johne; Yannick Burg; Jonathan Reitenbach; Marcel Teckemeyer; Nils Kocher; Sebastian Ferling	05:38.58	United States; Michael Cuellar; Gordon Holterman; Walter Taylor; Ethan Seder; Cole Ortiz; Nikita Lilichenko; Charles Turina; Gordon Johnson; Jacob Shusko	05:38.61	Great Britain; Charlie Pearson; Oskar Arzt-Jones; Dom Jackson; Oliver Ayres; Patrick Adams; Benedict Aldous; Seb Benzecry; Felix Drinkall; Vlad Saigau	05:43.25

=== Women's events ===
Event	Gold		Silver		Bronze	
JW1x	Clara Guerra; Italy	07:49.69	Alicia Bohn; Germany	07:54.26	Karolien Florijn; Netherlands	07:56.16
JW2-	Italy; Caterina Di Fonzo; Aisha Rocek	07:15.85	Denmark; Frida Sanggaard Nielsen; Ida Petersen	07:18.50	United States; Kailani Marchak; Kaitlyn Kynast	07:20.63
JW2x	United States; Caroline Sharis; Emily Delleman	07:08.12	Greece; Anastasia Vontzou; Anneta Kyridou	07:10.55	Italy; Nicoletta Bartalesi; Giovanna Schettino	07:10.78
JW4-	Germany; Friederike Mueller; Isabelle Huebener; Janina Arndt; Annabel Oertel	06:42.17	Italy; Laura Meriano; Benedetta Faravelli; Ludovica Braglia; Lara Maule	06:43.15	United States; Abigail Tarquinio; Sarah Ondak; Kelsey McGinley; India Robinson	06:47.60
JW4x	China; Guo Xueying; Xu Xingye; Pan Xingyun; Lu Shiyu	06:39.45	Great Britain; Annabel Stevens; Lola Anderson; Sheyi Blackett; Lucy Glover	06:41.47	Czech Republic; Magdalena Juzikova; Anna Santruckova; Pavlina Flamikova; Veronika Uhlova	06:43.15
JW8+	Czech Republic; Valentyna Solarova; Adela Truhlarova; Michala Pospisilova; Michaela Kidova; Zuzana Metlicka; Anna-Marie Mackova; Josefina Laznickova; Tereza Businska; Eva Klimova	06:27.82	Germany; Josephine Kiesel; Marie-Sophie Zeidler; Marieluise Witting; Klara Grube; Leonie Berge; Marie Elena Zurcher; Tabea Schendekehl; Helena Schaefer; Lynn Artinger	06:28.30	Italy; Linda De Filippis; Greta Martinelli; Khadija Alajdi El Idrissi; Alice Rossi; Claudia Cabula; Letizia Tontodonati; Beatrice Millo; Giorgia Pelacchi; Camilla Mariani (cox)	06:30.32

== See also ==
- Rowing at the 2016 Summer Olympics
- 2016 World Rowing Championships
- 2016 World Rowing U23 Championships
