= Adam Neill =

British rower (born 1990)

Personal information
- Nationality: British
- Born: 29 May 1990 (age 36) London

Sport
- Country: Great Britain
- Sport: Rowing
Medal record
Men's rowing
Representing Great Britain
World Championships
Bronze medal – third place	2018 Plovdiv	Coxless four

Adam Neill (born 29 May 1990) is a British rower.

== Rowing career ==
Neill made his Great Britain junior debut in 2008 and senior debut in 2017. He won the Ladies Plate at the Henley Royal Regatta in 2016 and is twice the indoor national champion. He won a bronze medal at the 2018 World Rowing Championships in Plovdiv, Bulgaria, as part of the coxless four with Thomas Ford, Jacob Dawson and James Johnston.
