= Letizia Tontodonati =

Italian rower (born 1999)

Personal information
- National team: Italy
- Born: 27 September 1999 (age 26) Turin, Italy

Sport
- Sport: Rowing
- Club: CUS Torino
Medal record
Event	1st	2nd	3rd
World Junior Championships	0	0	1

Letizia Tontodonati (born 27 September 1999) is an Italian rower bronze world winner at junior level at the World Rowing Junior Championships.

== Achievements ==
Year	Competition	Venue	Rank	Event	Time
2016	World Junior Championships	(Netherlands) Rotterdam	3rd	Eight	6:30.32
