= Mugurel Semciuc =

Romanian rower

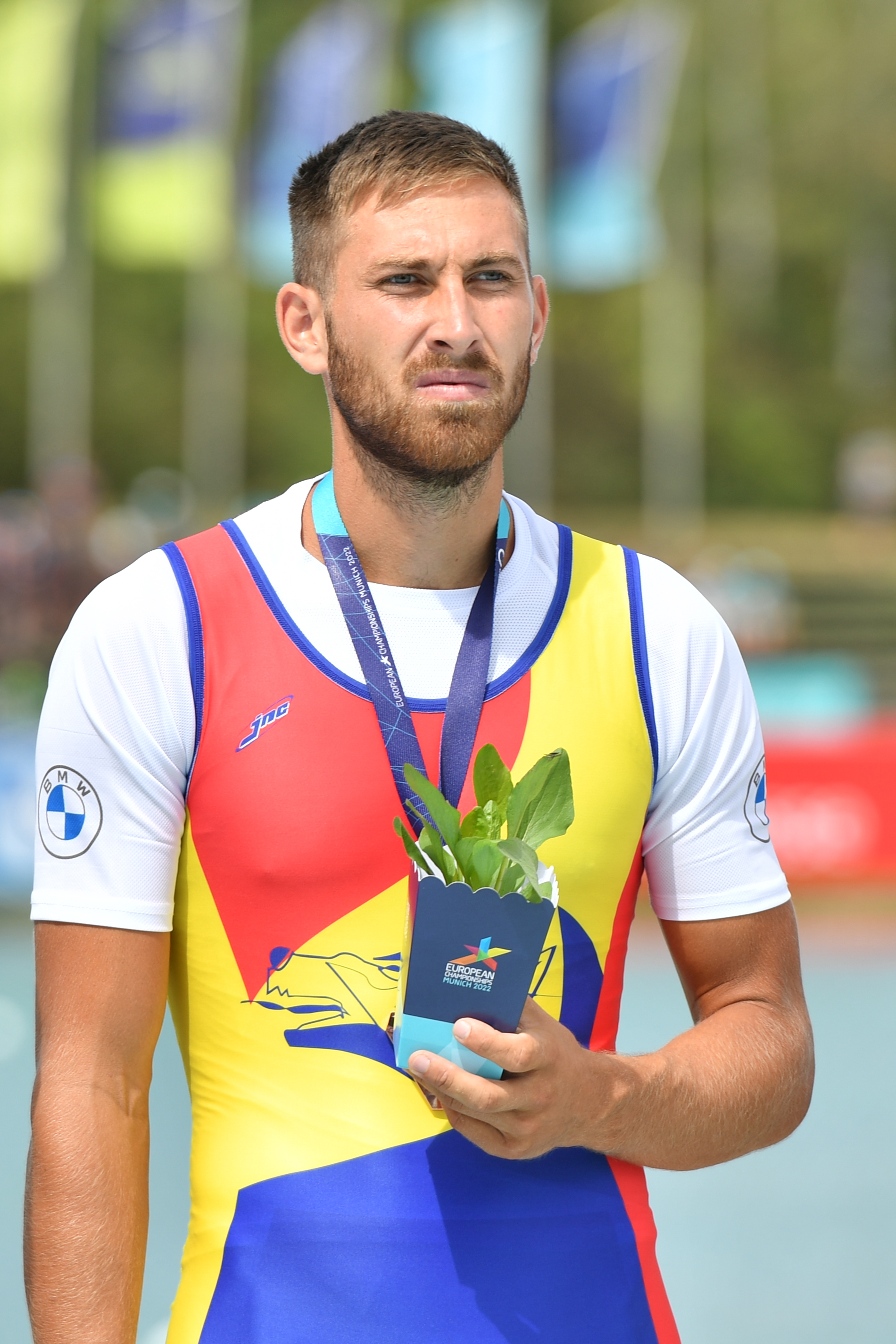
- Semciuc 2022 in Munich

Personal information
- Full name: Mugurel Vasile Semciuc
- Nationality: Romanian
- Born: 24 January 1998 (age 28) Suceava, Romania
- Height: 190 cm (6 ft 3 in)

Sport
- Country: Romania
- Sport: Rowing
- Event: Coxless four
- Club: Steaua București
- Coached by: Antonio Colamonici; Dorin Alupei
Medal record
Men's rowing
Representing Romania
Olympic Games
Silver medal – second place	2020 Tokyo	Coxless four
World Championships
Silver medal – second place	2019 Ottensheim	Coxless four
European Championships
Gold medal – first place	2026 Varese	Eight
Silver medal – second place	2021 Varese	Coxless four
Silver medal – second place	2023 Bled	Eight
Bronze medal – third place	2022 Oberschleißheim	Coxless four
Bronze medal – third place	2024 Szeged	Eight

Mugurel Vasile Semciuc (born 24 January 1998) is a Romanian rower. Competing in coxless fours he won silver medals at the 2021 Olympics, 2021 European Championships and 2019 World Rowing Championships.
