= Clark Dean =

American rower (born 2000)

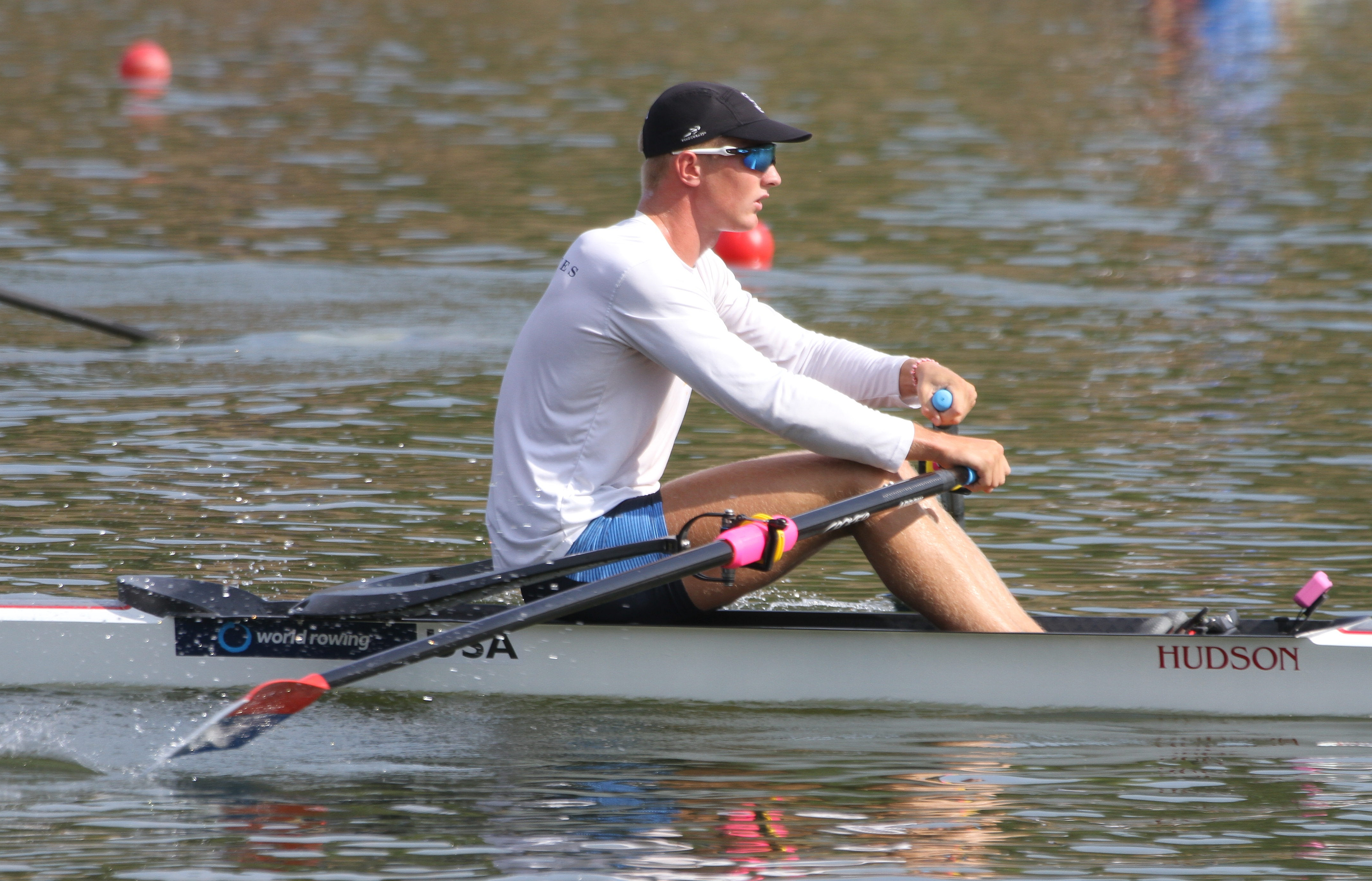
- Dean in 2018.

Personal information
- National team: USA
- Born: 3 February 2000 (age 26) Sarasota, Florida, U.S.
- Height: 1.95 m (6 ft 5 in)
- Weight: 93 kg (205 lb)

Sport
- Sport: Rowing

Achievements and titles
- Olympic finals: Tokyo 2020 M4-
Medal record
Men's rowing
Representing the United States
Olympic Games
Bronze medal – third place	2024 Paris	Eight
Event / 1st / 2nd / 3rd; World Junior Championships / 2 / 0 / 1

Clark Dean (born 3 February 2000) is an American rower. He is an Olympic Bronze medalist and twice world champion at junior level at the World Rowing Junior Championships.

== Career ==
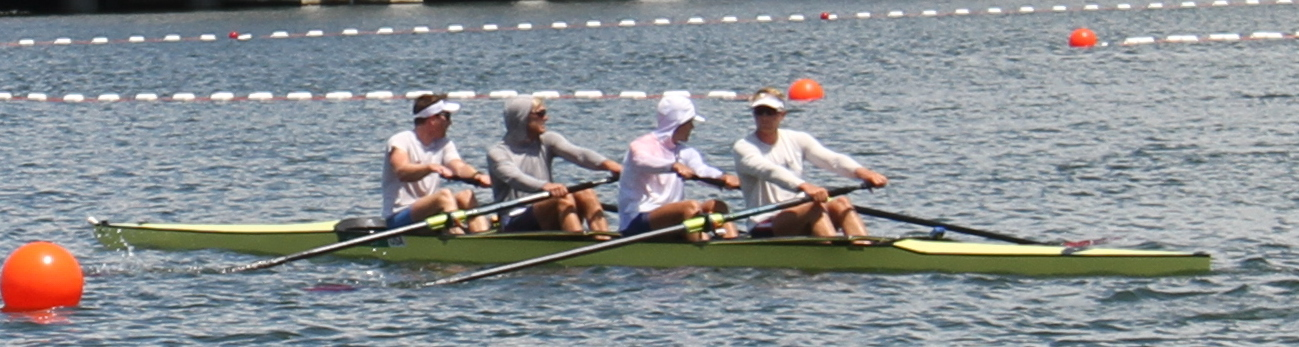
Dean (stroke) at 2020 Olympics

After winning three medals at the junior rowing world championships, two of which gold, in 2019, Dean made his senior debut with the US national team at just 19 years of age, obtaining a fifth place in the final of coxless four at the 2019 World Rowing Championships.

Dean represented the United States at the 2024 Summer Olympics and won a bronze medal in the men's eight, with a time of 5:25.28.

== Achievements ==
Year	Competition	Venue	Rank	Event	Time
2016	World Junior Championships	(Netherlands) Rotterdam	3rd	Quadruple scull	6:00.32
2017	World Junior Championships	(Lithuania) Trakai	1st	Single scull	7:04.73
2018	World Junior Championships	(Czech Republic) Račice	1st	Single scull	7:01.37
2019	World Championships	(Austria) Ottensheim	5th	Coxless four	6:13.40

== Awards ==
In 2018 Dean won the US Rowing award U19 Male Athlete of the Year.
