= James Johnston (rower) =

British rower (born 1994)

Personal information
- Nationality: British
- Born: 26 August 1994 (age 31)

Sport
- Country: Great Britain
- Sport: Rowing
- Club: Leander Club
Medal record
Men's rowing
Representing Great Britain
World Championships
Bronze medal – third place	2018 Plovdiv	Coxless four

James Johnston (born 26 August 1994) is a British rower.

== Rowing career ==
Johnston graduated from Harvard University and began his rowing career in South Africa and rowed for them in both the 2011 and 2012 World Junior Championships. After joining Leander in 2013 he made his British junior debut the following year. He won the Prince of Wales Challenge Cup at the Henley Royal Regatta and made his Great Britain senior debut in 2017. He won a bronze medal at the 2018 World Rowing Championships in Plovdiv, Bulgaria, as part of the coxless four with Thomas Ford, Jacob Dawson and Adam Neill.
