= Marco Di Costanzo =

Italian rower (born 1992)

Personal information
- Born: 9 June 1992 (age 34) Naples, Height: 185cm Weight: 87kg Italy

Sport
- Club: Fiamme Oro
Medal record
Men's rowing
Representing Italy
Olympic Games
Bronze medal – third place	2016 Rio de Janeiro	Coxless pair
Bronze medal – third place	2020 Tokyo	Coxless four
World Championships
Gold medal – first place	2015 Aiguebelette	Coxless four
Silver medal – second place	2017 Sarasota	Coxless four
Silver medal – second place	2018 Plovdiv	Coxless four
European Championships
Gold medal – first place	2017 Račice	Coxless four
Bronze medal – third place	2022 Munich	Eight

Marco Di Costanzo (born 9 June 1992) is an Italian rower. He won the bronze medal in the coxless pair at the 2016 Summer Olympics and in the coxless four at the 2020 Summer Olympics. He also won a gold medal at the 2015 World Rowing Championships and the silver medal at the 2017 World Rowing Championships and at the 2018 World Rowing Championships in the couxless four.
