= Cosmin Pascari =

Romanian rower

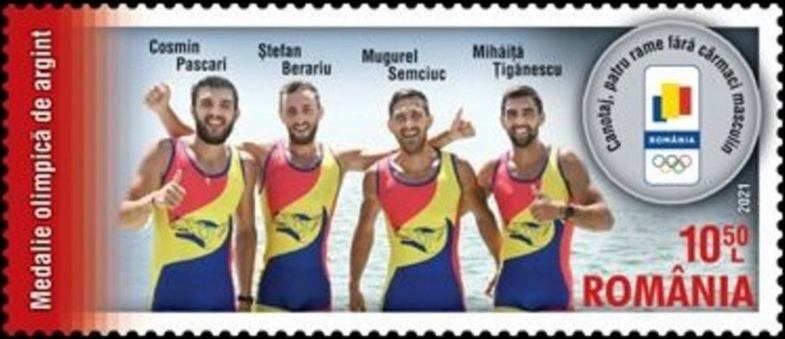
- Pascari (left) at the 2020 Summer Olympics

Personal information
- Nationality: Romanian
- Born: 12 May 1998 (age 28) Gura Humorului, Romania
- Height: 193 cm (6 ft 4 in)

Sport
- Country: Romania
- Sport: Rowing
- Event: Coxless four
- Club: CS Dinamo Bucuresti
- Coached by: Antonio Colamonici; Dorin Alupei
Medal record
Men's rowing
Representing Romania
Olympic Games
Silver medal – second place	2020 Tokyo	Coxless four
World Championships
Silver medal – second place	2019 Ottensheim	Coxless four
European Championships
Gold medal – first place	2018 Glasgow	Coxless four
Silver medal – second place	2021 Varese	Coxless four
World Junior Championships
Gold medal – first place	2016 Rotterdam	Coxless four
Gold medal – first place	2015 Rio de Janeiro	Coxless four
Silver medal – second place	2014 Hamburg	Coxless four

Cosmin Pascari (born 12 May 1998) is a Romanian rower. Competing in the coxless four, he won silver medals at the 2020 Summer Olympics, 2021 European Championships and 2019 World Rowing Championships.
