= Veselin Savić =

Serbian rower (born 1989)

Personal information
- Born: 22 September 1989 (age 36)
Medal record
Men's rowing
Representing Serbia
European Championships
Gold medal – first place	2014 Belgrade	M2−
World Rowing U23 Championships
Gold medal – first place	2011 Amsterdam	Coxed fours

Veselin Savić (Serbian: Веселин Савић, born 22 September 1989) is a Serbian rower.

He won a gold medal at the 2011 World Rowing U23 Championships in men's coxed four and posted U23 world record.
