= Bruno Rosetti =

Italian rower

Personal information
- National team: Italy
- Born: 5 January 1988 (age 38) Ravenna, Italy
- Height: 1.96 m (6 ft 5 in)
- Weight: 103 kg (227 lb)

Sport
- Sport: Rowing
- Club: Canottieri Aniene
Medal record
| Event | 1st | 2nd | 3rd |
|---|---|---|---|
| Olympic Games | 0 | 0 | 1 |
| World Championships | 0 | 1 | 1 |
| World Junior Championships | 1 | 0 | 0 |
| Total | 1 | 1 | 2 |

Bruno Rosetti (born 5 January 1988) is an Italian rower. He won the bronze medal in the coxless four at the 2020 Summer Olympics and a silver and a bronze medal at the World Rowing Championships.

== Achievements ==
| Year | Competition | Venue | Rank | Event | Time |
|---|---|---|---|---|---|
| 2017 | World Championships | (United States) Sarasota | 3rd | Eight | 5:43.01 |
| 2018 | World Championships | (Bulgaria) Plovdiv | 2nd | Coxless four | 5:44.99 |
