= Mihăiță Țigănescu =

Romanian rower

Mihăiță Vasile Țigănescu
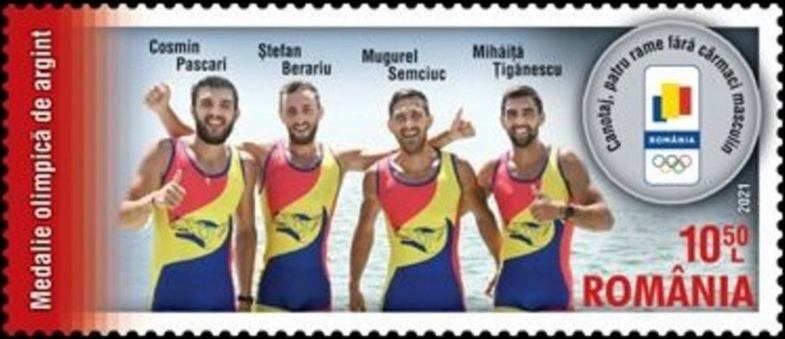
- Țigănescu (right) at the 2020 Summer Olympics

Personal information
- Nationality: Romanian
- Born: 4 February 1998 (age 28) Suceava, Romania
- Education: University of Craiova
- Height: 190 cm (6 ft 3 in)

Sport
- Country: Romania
- Sport: Rowing
- Event: Coxless four
- Club: CS Dinamo Bucuresti
- Coached by: Antonio Colamonici; Dorin Alupei
Medal record
Men's rowing
Representing Romania
Olympic Games
| Silver medal – second place | 2020 Tokyo | Coxless four |
World Championships
| Silver medal – second place | 2019 Ottensheim | Coxless four |
European Championships
| Gold medal – first place | 2018 Glasgow | Coxless four |
| Silver medal – second place | 2021 Varese | Coxless four |
| Silver medal – second place | 2023 Bled | Eight |
| Bronze medal – third place | 2022 Oberschleißheim | Coxless four |
| Bronze medal – third place | 2024 Szeged | Eight |
World Junior Championships
| Gold medal – first place | 2016 Rotterdam | Coxless four |

Mihăiță Vasile Țigănescu (born 4 February 1998) is a Romanian rower. Competing in coxless fours he won silver medals at the 2020 Summer Olympics, 2021 European Championships and 2019 World Rowing Championships.
