= Andrew Reed (rower) =

American rower

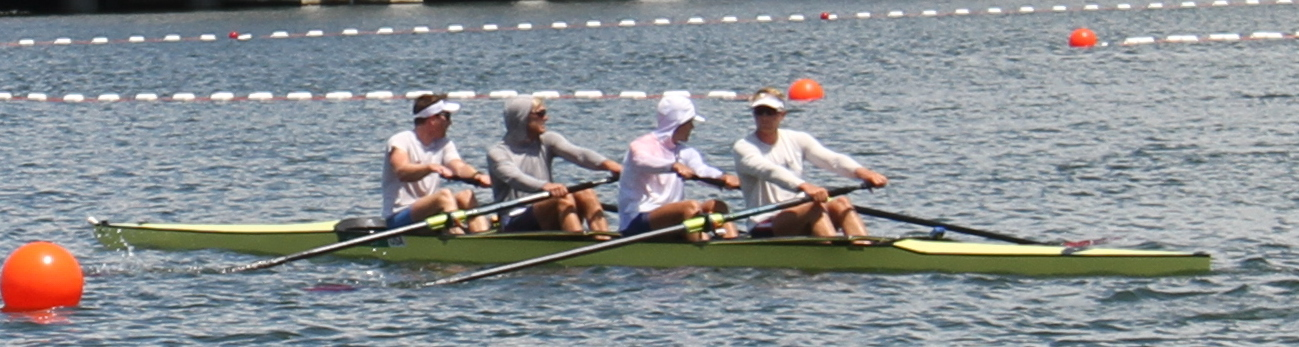
- Reed (bow) at the 2020 Summer Olympics

Personal information
- Born: December 19, 1991 (age 34) Worcester, Massachusetts, U.S.
- Height: 6 ft 3 in (1.91 m)

Sport
- Country: United States
- Sport: Rowing

Achievements and titles
- Olympic finals: Tokyo 2020 M4-

Andrew Reed (born December 19, 1991) is an American rower. He competed in the 2020 Summer Olympics.

== Personal life ==
Reed's cousin, Henry Hollingsworth, rowed at the 2024 Summer Olympics.
