= Matteo Castaldo =

Italian rower (born 1985)

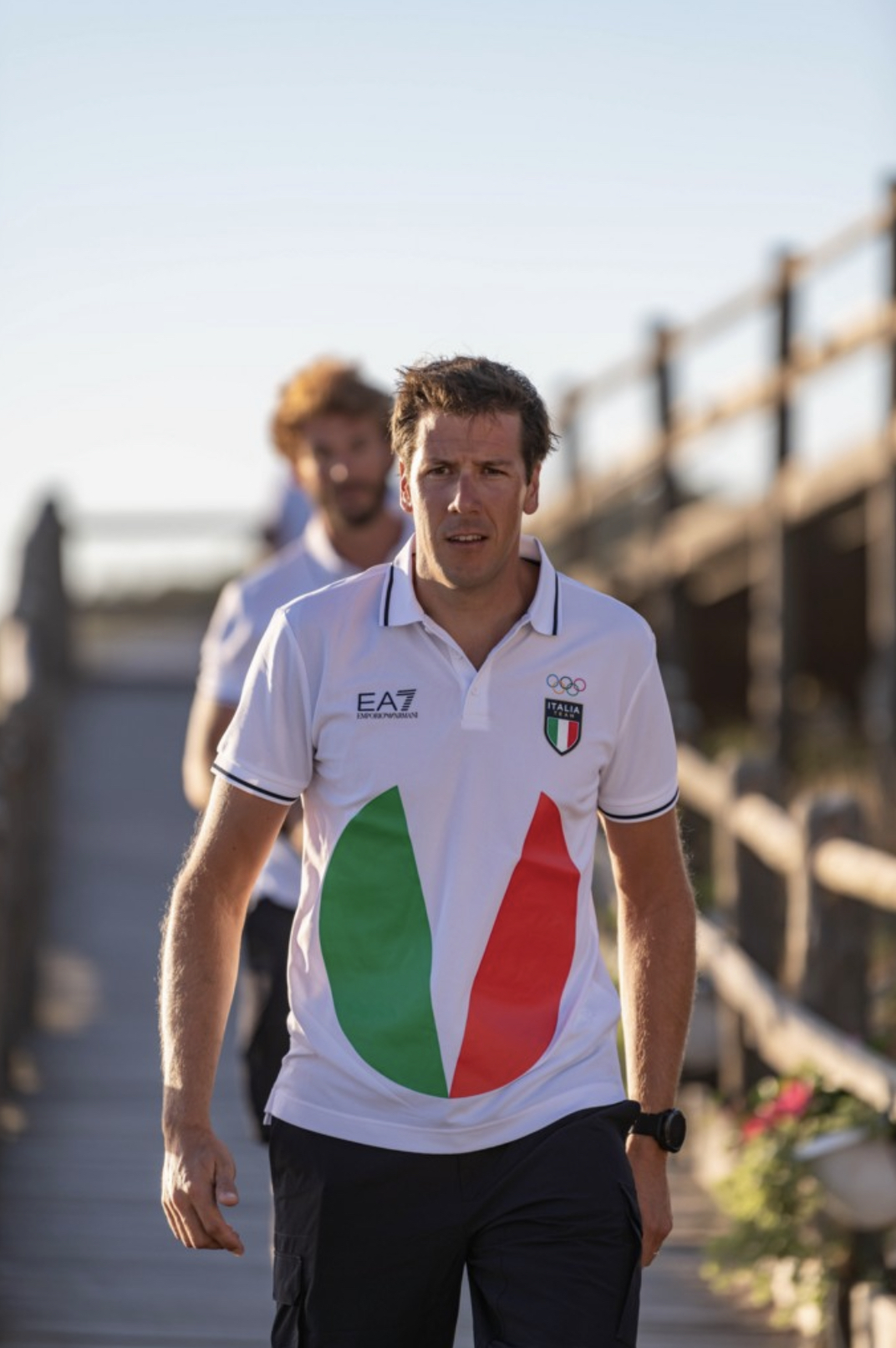

Personal information
- Born: 11 December 1985 (age 40) Naples, Italy
Medal record
Men's rowing
Representing Italy
Olympic Games
Bronze medal – third place	2016 Rio de Janeiro	Coxless four
Bronze medal – third place	2020 Tokyo	Coxless four
World Championships
Gold medal – first place	2015 Aiguebelette	Coxless four
Silver medal – second place	2017 Sarasota	Coxless four
Silver medal – second place	2018 Plovdiv	Coxless four
European Championships
Gold medal – first place	2017 Račice	Coxless four
Bronze medal – third place	2022 Munich	Eight

Matteo Castaldo (born 11 December 1985) is an Italian rower. In the coxless four, he won the bronze medal at the Rio 2016 and Tokyo 2020 Olympic Games, a gold medal at the 2015 World Rowing Championships, and the silver medal at the 2017 World Rowing Championships and at the 2018 World Rowing Championships.
