= Marcin Brzeziński =

Polish rower

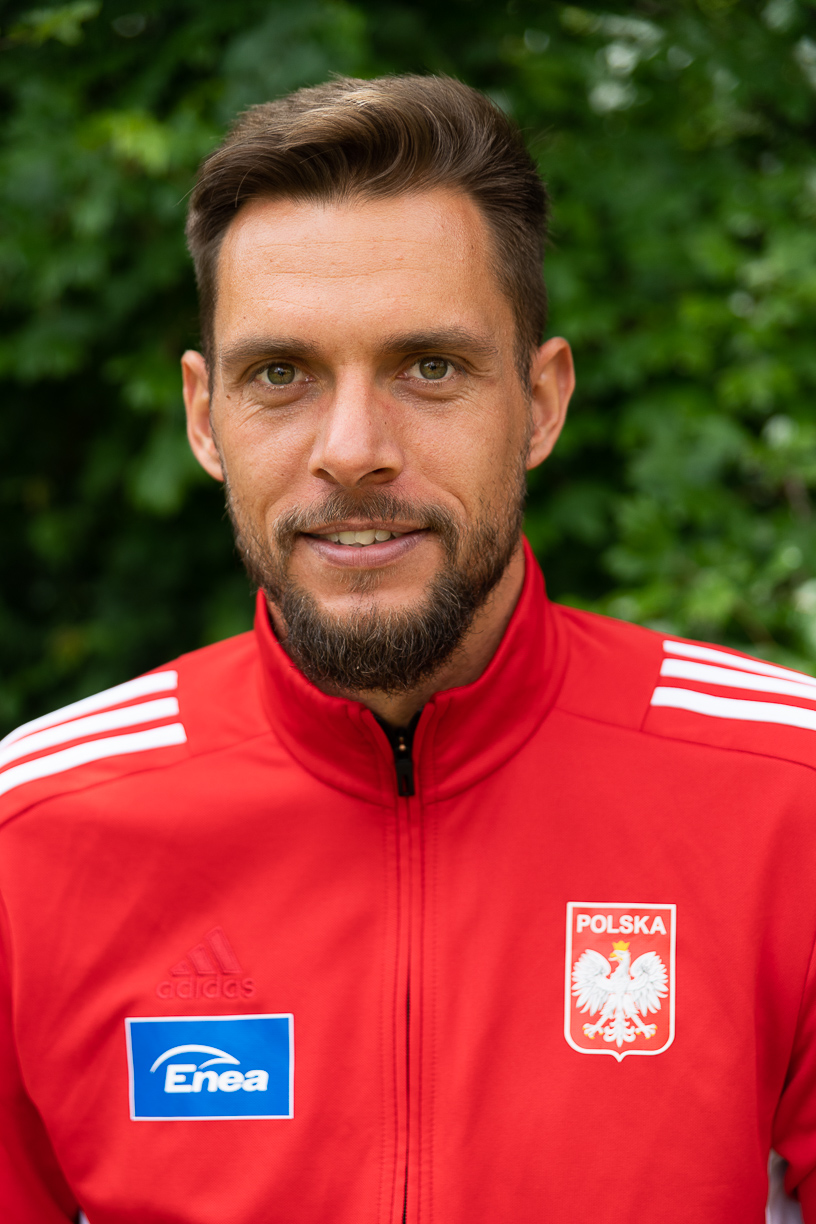

Personal information
- Nationality: Polish
- Born: 6 January 1984 (age 42) Warsaw, Poland
- Height: 1.94 m (6 ft 4 in)
- Weight: 90 kg (198 lb)

Sport
- Country: Poland
- Sport: Rowing
- Event(s): Coxless four, Eight
- Club: Warszawskie TW
Medal record
Men's rowing
Representing Poland
World Championships
Gold medal – first place	2019 Ottensheim	Coxless four
Bronze medal – third place	2014 Amsterdam	Eight
European Championships
Gold medal – first place	2009 Brest	Eight
Gold medal – first place	2011 Plovdiv	Eight
Gold medal – first place	2012 Varese	Eight
Silver medal – second place	2010 Montemor-o-Velho	Eight
Silver medal – second place	2013 Sevilla	Eight
Silver medal – second place	2017 Račice	Eight
Silver medal – second place	2019 Lucerne	Coxless four
Bronze medal – third place	2008 Marathon	Eight

Marcin Brzeziński (born 6 January 1984) is a Polish rower. He is the reigning world champion in the men's coxless four won at the 2019 World Rowing Championships. He competed at the 2008 and 2012 Summer Olympics in the men's eight, finishing in 5th and 7th respectively.
