= Paul Jacquot =

Swiss rower

Personal information
- Nationality: Switzerland
- Born: 26 December 1995 (age 29)
- Height: 2.04 m (6 ft 8 in)

Sport
- Sport: Rowing

Paul Jacquot (born 26 December 1995) is a Swiss rower. He competed in the 2020 Summer Olympics.
