= Kyle Schoonbee =

South African rower

Personal information
- Nationality: South African
- Born: 8 November 1995 (age 29)

Sport
- Country: South Africa
- Sport: Rowing

Kyle Schoonbee (born 8 November 1995) is a South African rower. He competed in the 2020 Summer Olympics.
