= Mateusz Wilangowski =

Polish rower

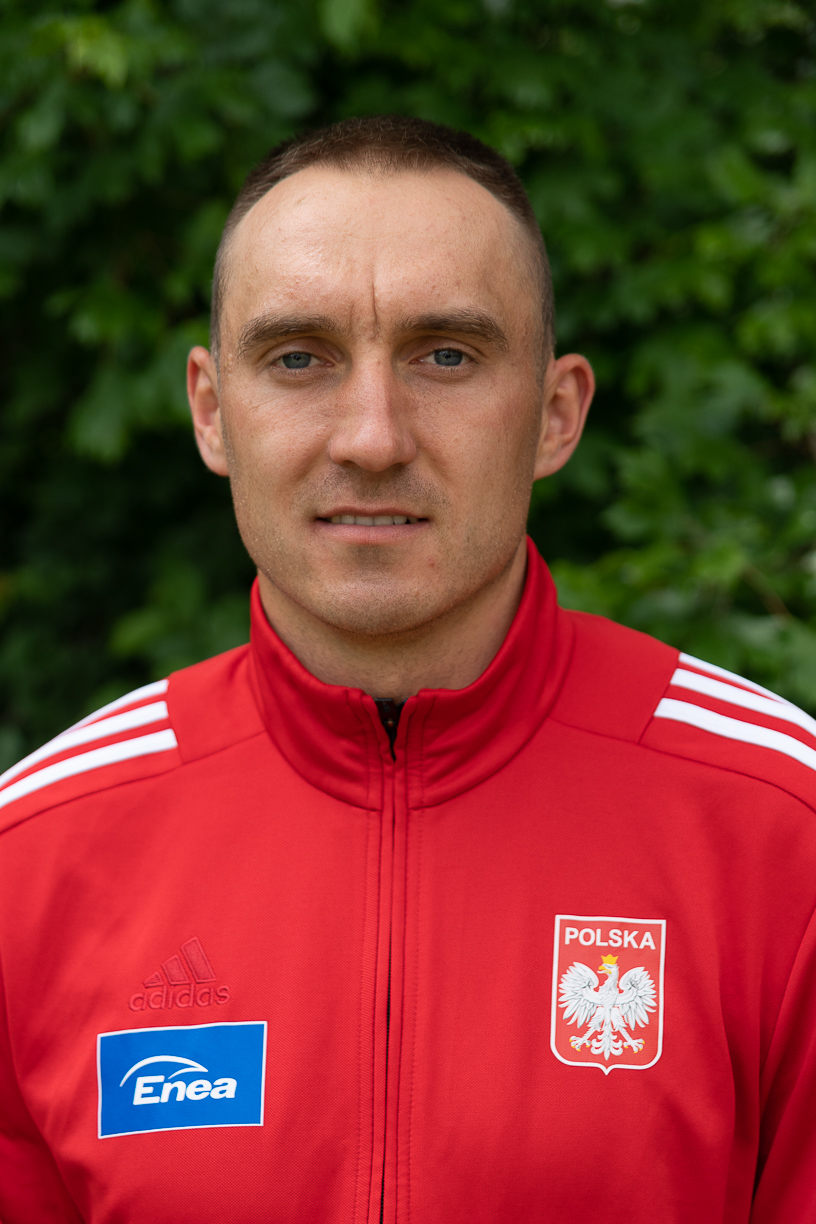
- Mateusz Wilangowski in 2019.

Personal information
- Nationality: Polish
- Born: 7 October 1991 (age 34) Mokre, Poland
- Height: 1.94 m (6 ft 4 in)
- Weight: 86 kg (190 lb)

Sport
- Country: Poland
- Sport: Rowing
- Event(s): Coxless four, Eight
Medal record
Men's rowing
Representing Poland
World Championships
Gold medal – first place	2019 Ottensheim	Coxless four
Bronze medal – third place	2014 Amsterdam	Eight
European Championships
Silver medal – second place	2017 Račice	Eight
Silver medal – second place	2019 Lucerne	Coxless four

Mateusz Wilangowski (born 7 October 1991) is a Polish rower. He is the reigning world champion in the men's coxless four won at the 2019 World Rowing Championships. He competed in the men's eight event at the 2016 Summer Olympics.
