= Mikołaj Burda =

Polish rower

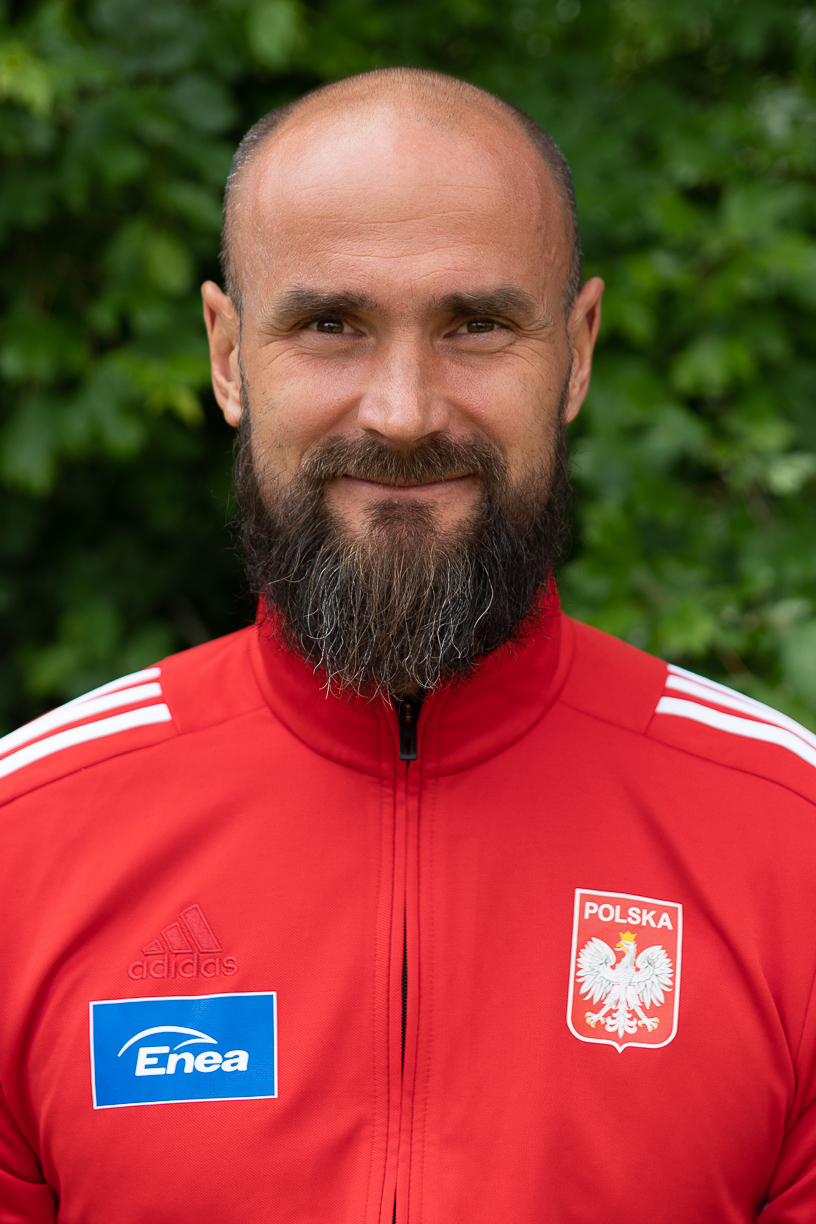

Personal information
- Nationality: Polish
- Born: 8 July 1982 (age 43) Toruń, Poland
- Height: 1.91 m (6 ft 3 in)
- Weight: 98 kg (216 lb)

Sport
- Country: Poland
- Sport: Rowing
- Event(s): Coxless four, Eight
- Club: RTW Lotto Bydgostia
Medal record
Men's rowing
Representing Poland
World Championships
Gold medal – first place	2019 Ottensheim	Coxless four
Bronze medal – third place	2014 Amsterdam	Eight
European Championships
Gold medal – first place	2009 Brest	Eight
Gold medal – first place	2011 Plovdiv	Eight
Gold medal – first place	2012 Varese	Eight
Silver medal – second place	2007 Poznań	Eight
Silver medal – second place	2010 Montemor-o-Velho	Eight
Silver medal – second place	2013 Sevilla	Eight
Silver medal – second place	2017 Račice	Eight
Silver medal – second place	2019 Lucerne	Coxless four
Bronze medal – third place	2008 Marathon	Eight

Mikołaj Burda (born 8 July 1982) is a Polish representative rower. He is a five time Olympian competing at each Olympics from 2004 to 2020. He is the reigning world champion in the men's coxless four won at the 2019 World Rowing Championships.
