= Michał Szpakowski =

Polish rower

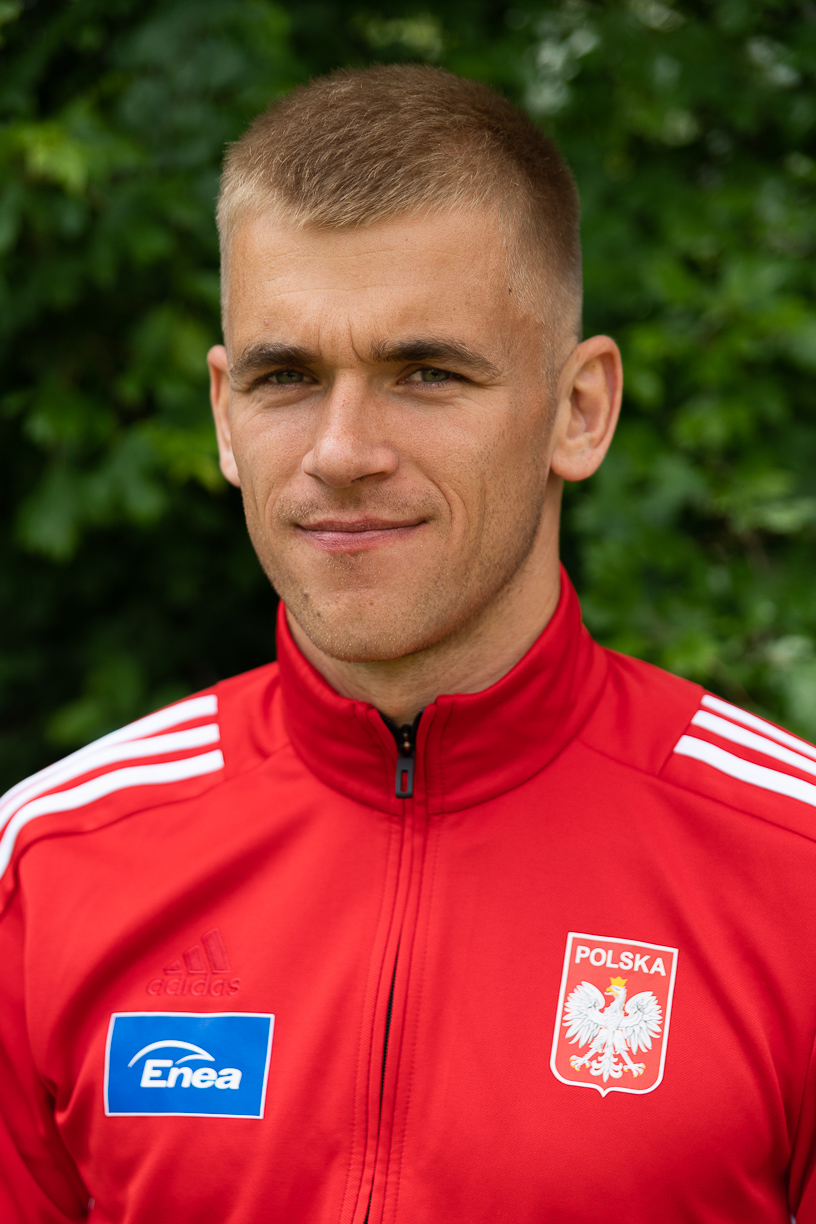
- Szpakowski in 2019.

Personal information
- Nationality: Polish
- Born: 23 April 1989 (age 37) Toruń, Poland
- Height: 1.95 m (6 ft 5 in)
- Weight: 94 kg (207 lb)

Sport
- Country: Poland
- Sport: Rowing
- Event(s): Coxless four, Eight
- Club: Torun AZS SMS
Medal record
Men's rowing
Representing Poland
World Championships
Gold medal – first place	2019 Ottensheim	Coxless four
Bronze medal – third place	2014 Amsterdam	Eight
European Championships
Gold medal – first place	2009 Brest	Eight
Gold medal – first place	2011 Plovdiv	Eight
Gold medal – first place	2012 Varese	Eight
Silver medal – second place	2010 Montemor-o-Velho	Eight
Silver medal – second place	2013 Sevilla	Eight
Silver medal – second place	2017 Račice	Eight
Silver medal – second place	2019 Lucerne	Coxless four

Michał Szpakowski (born 23 April 1989) is a Polish rower. He is the reigning world champion in the men's coxless four won at the 2019 World Rowing Championships. He competed in the Men's eight event at the 2012 Summer Olympics.
