= Sandro Torrente =

South African rower

Personal information
- Nationality: South African
- Born: 13 May 1998 (age 28)

Sport
- Country: South Africa
- Sport: Rowing

Sandro Torrente (born 13 May 1998) is a South African rower and went to St Benedict's College in South Africa where he was the rowing captain in his under 19 rowing year. He competed in boat race and South African Schools Rowing regatta where he won gold in both. He also competed in junior world where he won bronze. More recently he competed at the 2020 Summer Olympics, held July–August 2021 in Tokyo.
