= Jürgen Gröbler =

German rowing coach

Jürgen Heinz Lothar Grobler OBE (born 31 July 1946, Magdeburg) is a German rowing coach, formerly the Olympic team coach of East Germany and later of Great Britain. He coached crews to medals at ten Olympiads from 1972 to 2016, with the exception of the 1984 Games, which were boycotted by Eastern Bloc countries.

== Coaching career ==
Having studied sports science at Leipzig University, he returned to his local rowing club in Magdeburg and first attracted attention by coaching Wolfgang Güldenpfennig to the bronze medal in the 1972 Olympics. He then moved on to coach both the quadruple scull and coxless pairs who won gold at the 1976 Summer Olympics. The coxless pair of Bernd and Jörg Landvoigt also went on to triumph at the 1980 Summer Olympics under Grobler's guidance. From 1980 to 1990 he was chief coach of the East German women's rowing team.

When Germany was reunited and the East German national sports administration collapsed in 1991, Grobler moved to Britain where he was employed by Leander Club and the Amateur Rowing Association. Controversy surrounded the appointment, given the suspicions that drug use had been rife in East German sports and that any senior coach would have been involved or had knowledge of the drugs programme. In an interview in 1998 he admitted that he had "difficulties" with the thought that drug taking may have caused medical problems for rowers, and that he had given "snippets" of information to the Stasi, the East German security organisation. Steve Redgrave defended him, blaming the East German system for the drug use, rather than Grobler personally, in keeping with Grobler's own statement that "I have to live with what went on in East Germany. I was born in the wrong place. It was not possible to walk away."

For Great Britain he achieved Olympic golds with:

- Steve Redgrave and Matthew Pinsent in 1992 and 1996 in the pair
- James Cracknell, Tim Foster, Steve Redgrave and Matthew Pinsent in 2000 in the four
- Steve Williams, James Cracknell, Ed Coode and Matthew Pinsent in 2004 in the four,
- Tom James, Steve Williams, Pete Reed, and Andrew Triggs Hodge in 2008 in the four,
- Alex Gregory, Pete Reed, Tom James and Andrew Triggs Hodge in 2012 in the four, and
- Alex Gregory, Moe Sbihi, George Nash and Constantine Louloudis in 2016 in the four
- Phelan Hill, Will Satch, Matt Langridge, Paul Bennett, Pete Reed, Matt Gotrel, Andrew Triggs Hodge, Tom Ransley and Scott Durant in 2016 in the eight.

In August 2000, the month prior to coaching the coxless four to gold in Sydney, he took part in a 3-part BBC documentary, Gold Fever. This followed him and the crew in the years leading up to the Olympics, showing the hard work and tough decisions he faced in the quest for gold.

In 2000 he won the BBC Sports Personality of the Year Coach Award, and in March 2006 he was appointed an Honorary Officer of the Order of the British Empire (OBE) by Culture Secretary Tessa Jowell for his contribution to British sport.

In August 2020, it was announced that Grobler was retiring as Chief Coach for British Rowing with immediate effect, then in September 2021 it was announced that he was joining the French Rowing Federation as Executive High Performance Consultant.

== Personal life ==
Grobler lives in Henley-on-Thames with his wife Angela. They have a son, Chris.

== See also ==
- Leander Club (Hon. Member).
