= Scott Durant =

British rower

Scott Durant MBE
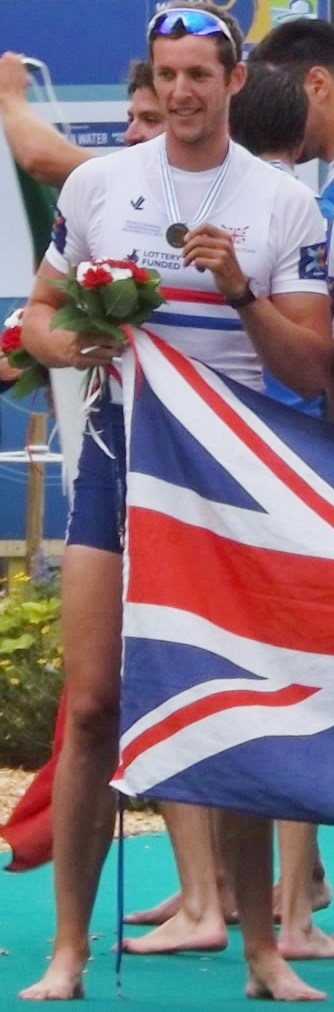

Personal information
- Born: 12 February 1988 (age 38) Los Angeles, United States
- Height: 196 cm (6 ft 5 in)
Medal record
Men's rowing
Representing Great Britain
Olympic Games
| Gold medal – first place | 2016 Rio de Janeiro | Eight |
World Championships
| Silver medal – second place | 2014 Amsterdam | M2+ |
| Bronze medal – third place | 2015 Aiguebelette | M4- |
European Championships
| Bronze medal – third place | 2016 Brandenburg | Eight |
| Gold medal – first place | 2015 Poznań | M4- |
| Bronze medal – third place | 2014 Belgrade | Eight |

Scott David Durant (born 12 February 1988) is a British rower and gold medallist in the Men's Eight at the 2016 Olympic Summer Games.

== Rowing career ==
Durant, along with his brother Mason, started his rowing career at Lancaster Royal Grammar School (LRGS). He competed at the 2014 World Rowing Championships in Bosbaan, Amsterdam, where he won a silver medal as part of the coxed pair with Alan Sinclair and Henry Fieldman. The following year he was part of the British team that topped the medal table at the 2015 World Rowing Championships at Lac d'Aiguebelette in France, where he won a bronze medal as part of the coxless four with Alan Sinclair, Tom Ransley and Stewart Innes. He competed in the 2015 European Rowing Championships in Poznań winning a gold medal.

He was a gold medallist in the men's eight at the 2016 Summer Olympics with Tom Ransley, Andrew Triggs Hodge, Matt Gotrel, Pete Reed, Paul Bennett, Matt Langridge, Will Satch and Phelan Hill .

== Awards ==
Durant was appointed Member of the Order of the British Empire (MBE) in the 2017 New Year Honours for services to rowing.
