= Tom Ransley =

British rower

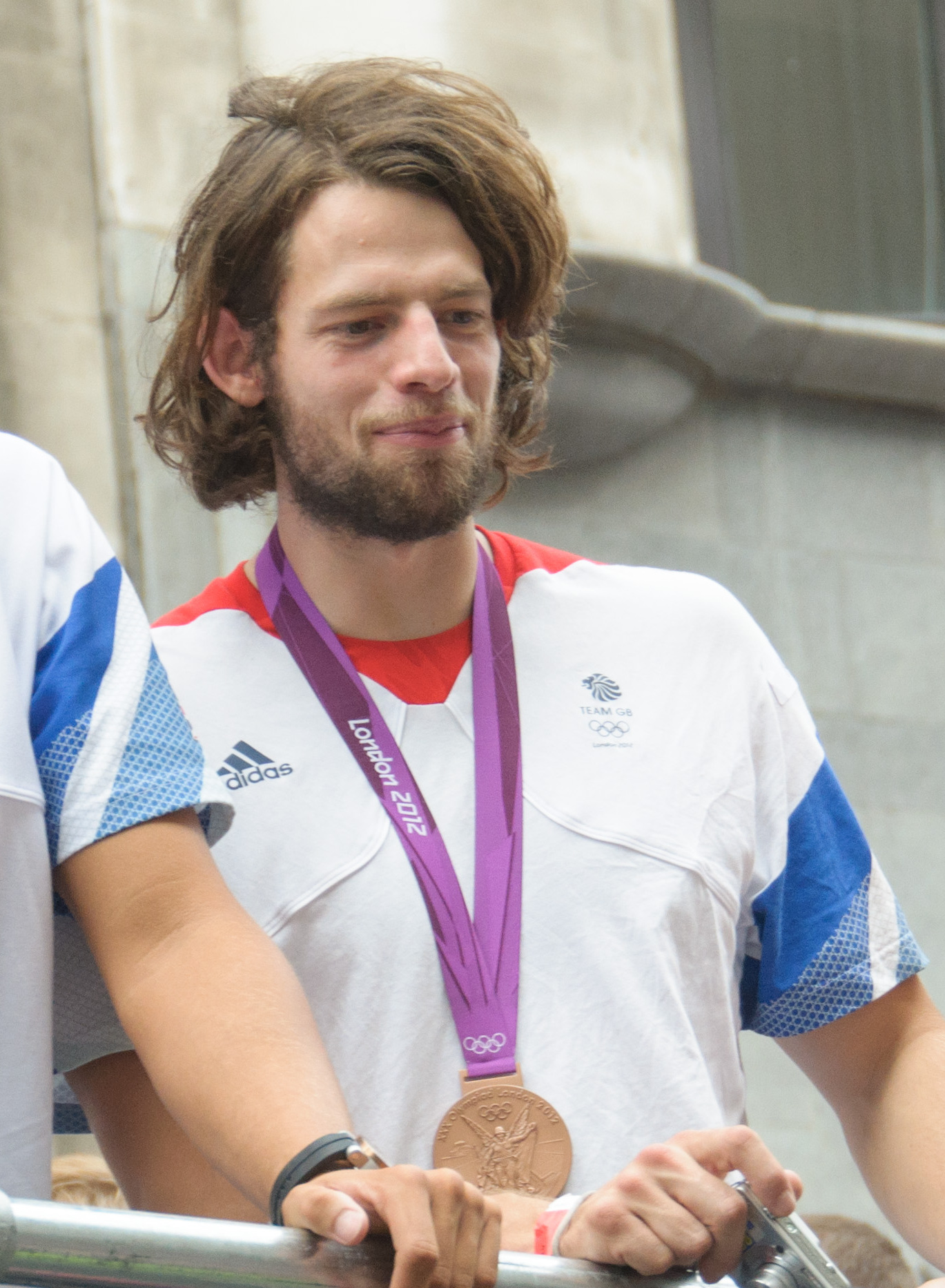

Personal information
- Full name: Thomas Ransley
- Born: Kent, England
- Education: University of York; University of Cambridge
- Height: 196 cm (6 ft 5 in)
Medal record
Men's rowing
Representing Great Britain
Olympic Games
Gold medal – first place	2016 Rio de Janeiro	Eight
Bronze medal – third place	2012 London	Eight
World Championships
Gold medal – first place	2013 Chungju	Eight
Gold medal – first place	2014 Amsterdam	Eight
Silver medal – second place	2010 Karapiro	Eight
Silver medal – second place	2011 Bled	Eight
Bronze medal – third place	2015 Aiguebelette	Coxless four
Bronze medal – third place	2018 Plovdiv	Eight
European Championships
Gold medal – first place	2015 Poznan	Coxless four
Bronze medal – third place	2016 Brandenburg	Eight

Thomas Matthew Ransley MBE (born 6 September 1985) is a retired British rower. At the 2016 Summer Olympics in Rio de Janeiro he was part of the British crew that won the gold medal in the eight, was twice a World Champion and in 2015 was the European Champion in the men's coxless four.

== Rowing career and achievements ==
Ransley was part of the British squad that topped the medal table at the 2011 World Rowing Championships in Bled, where he won a silver medal as part of the eight with Nathaniel Reilly-O'Donnell, Cameron Nichol, James Foad, Alex Partridge, Moe Sbihi, Greg Searle, Daniel Ritchie and Phelan Hill.

Ransley competed at the 2013 World Rowing Championships in Chungju, where he won a gold medal as part of the eight with Daniel Ritchie, Alex Gregory, Pete Reed, Moe Sbihi, Andrew Triggs Hodge, George Nash, Will Satch and Phelan Hill. The following year he competed at the 2014 World Rowing Championships in Bosbaan, Amsterdam, where he won a gold medal as part of the eight with Nathaniel Reilly-O'Donnell, Matthew Tarrant, Will Satch, Matt Gotrel, Pete Reed, Paul Bennett, Constantine Louloudis and Phelan Hill.

The following year he was part of the British team that topped the medal table at the 2015 World Rowing Championships at Lac d'Aiguebelette in France, where he won a bronze medal as part of the coxless four with Scott Durant, Alan Sinclair and Stewart Innes. He won a bronze medal at the 2018 World Rowing Championships in Plovdiv, Bulgaria, as part of the eight with Alan Sinclair, Thomas George, Moe Sbihi, Oliver Wynne-Griffith, Matthew Tarrant, Will Satch and Henry Fieldman.

Ransley was set to compete at the 2020 Summer Olympic Games in Tokyo, but after the postponement of the games he announced his retirement from international rowing in April 2020.

Following his retirement, Ransley became a journalist specialising in rowing and is co-editor of Row360 magazine.

=== Olympic Games ===
- 2012 London – Bronze, Men's Eight
- 2016 Rio de Janeiro – Gold, Men's Eight

=== World Championships ===
- 2010 Karapiro – Silver, Men's eight
- 2011 Bled – Silver, Men's eight
- 2013 Chungju – Gold, Men's eight
- 2014 Amsterdam – Gold, Men's eight
- 2015 Aiguebelette – Bronze, Men's coxless four
- 2018 Plovdiv – Bronze, Men's eight

=== World Cups ===
- 2009 Banyoles – Bronze, Eight
- 2009 Munich – Bronze, Eight
- 2011 Munich – Silver, Eight
- 2011 Lucerne – Bronze, Eight
- 2012 Belgrade – Silver, Eight
- 2012 Lucerne – Silver, Eight
- 2012 Munich – Bronze, Eight

=== World University Rowing Championships ===
- 2008 Bronze – Coxless four
