= Stephen Jones (rower) =

New Zealand rower (born 1993)

Personal information
- Nationality: New Zealand
- Born: 29 April 1993 (age 33) Wellington
- Height: 193 cm (6 ft 4 in)
- Weight: 90 kg (198 lb)

Stephen Jones (born 29 April 1993) is a New Zealand rower. He was educated, and commenced rowing, at St Peter's College, Auckland. He came fourth at the 2015 World Rowing Championships with the men's eight, qualifying the boat for the 2016 Olympics. He came sixth with his team at the eight competition in Rio de Janeiro.
