= Rowing at the 2016 Summer Olympics =

Rowing at the Games of the XXXI Olympiad
- Venue: Rodrigo de Freitas Lagoon
- Dates: 6–13 August 2016
- No. of events: 14
- Competitors: 547 from 69 nations

The rowing competitions at the 2016 Summer Olympics in Rio de Janeiro took place from 6 to 13 August 2016 at the Rodrigo de Freitas Lagoon in Lagoa. Fourteen medal events were being contested by 547 athletes, 334 men and 213 women.

For the third Olympics in a row, Great Britain was the most successful nation, topping the medal table with three golds and two silvers. Germany and New Zealand finished equal in second place with two golds and one silver each.

== Competition format ==
There were eight events for men and six for women. Events included categories for open weight and restricted weight (lightweight) athletes, and two styles of rowing: sweep, where competitors each use a single oar, and sculling, where they used two.

Sculling events included men's and women's singles, doubles, lightweight doubles, and quads. Sweep events were men's and women's pairs and eights, and men's fours and lightweight fours.

Although the size and composition of the 14 Olympic classes remained unchanged from the 2012 format, the number of boats for men had been reduced in the single sculls, quadruple sculls, and eight, spurring a change towards an increased proportion of boats for women in the single sculls, pair, double sculls, and lightweight double sculls.

== Qualification ==
Each competing nation might qualify one boat for each of the fourteen events. The majority of the qualifying places were awarded based on the results at the 2015 World Rowing Championships, held at Lac d'Aiguebelette, France from August 30 to September 4, 2015. Places are awarded to National Olympic Committees, not to specific athletes, finishing in the top 9 in the single sculls (both men and women), top 5 in the eights, and top 11 in the pairs, doubles, and lightweight doubles, and (only for men) in the coxless four and lightweight four. In the quadruple sculls, the first eight nations will be qualified in the men's event, and the first five in the women's. Further berths were distributed to the nations (and in this case to specific competitors) at four continental qualifying regattas in Asia and Oceania (except for Australia and New Zealand), Africa, Latin America, and Europe (with the additional participation of the United States, Canada, Australia, and New Zealand), and at a final Olympic qualification regatta in Lucerne, Switzerland.

== Schedule ==
After the first day of the competition, many rowers voiced their frustration about the rough conditions on the water. New Zealand rowers Emma Twigg and Mahé Drysdale talked about the regatta being about "survival rather than skill", and Rowing New Zealand lodged an official complaint with the organisers for not postponing the first day when conditions became "unrowable". With the water even more choppy at the start of the second day, that day's rowing was postponed.

Legend
H	Heats	R	Repechage	¼	Quarter-finals	½	Semi-finals	F	Final

Men
Event↓/Date →	Sat 6	Sun 7	Mon 8	Tue 9	Wed 10	Thu 11	Fri 12	Sat 13
Single sculls	H	R		¼		½		F
Pair	H	R		½		F		
Double sculls	H	R		½		F		
Lightweight double sculls		H	R		½		F	
Four		H	R		½		F	
Quadruple sculls	H		R		F			
Lightweight four	H	R		½		F		
Eight			H		R			F

Women
Event↓/Date →	Sat 6	Sun 7	Mon 8	Tue 9	Wed 10	Thu 11	Fri 12	Sat 13
Single sculls	H	R		¼		½		F
Pair		H	R		½		F	
Double sculls	H	R		½		F		
Lightweight double sculls		H	R		½		F	
Quadruple sculls	H		R		F			
Eight			H		R			F

== Participation ==
=== Participating nations (number of rowers) ===
- Algeria (2)
- Angola (2)
- Argentina (2)
- Australia (29)
- Austria (3)
- Azerbaijan (2)
- Bahamas (1)
- Belarus (10)
- Belgium (1)
- Bermuda (1)
- Brazil (4)
- Bulgaria (2)
- Canada (26)
- Chile (4)
- China (17)
- Croatia (3)
- Cuba (7)
- Czech Republic (10)
- Denmark (13)
- Ecuador (1)
- Egypt (2)
- Estonia (4)
- France (18)
- Germany (35)
- Great Britain (43)
- Greece (10)
- Hong Kong (4)
- Hungary (3)
- India (1)
- Indonesia (2)
- Iran (1)
- Iraq (1)
- Ireland (5)
- Italy (27)
- Japan (4)
- Kazakhstan (2)
- Libya (1)
- Lithuania (10)
- Mexico (2)
- Netherlands (36)
- New Zealand (36)
- Nigeria (1)
- Norway (5)
- Paraguay (2)
- Peru (2)
- Poland (26)
- Romania (18)
- Russia (4)
- Serbia (4)
- Singapore (1)
- South Africa (12)
- South Korea (2)
- Spain (4)
- Sweden (1)
- Switzerland (11)
- Chinese Taipei (1)
- Thailand (2)
- Togo (1)
- Trinidad and Tobago (1)
- Tunisia (3)
- Turkey (2)
- Ukraine (8)
- United States (41)
- Uruguay (1)
- Uzbekistan (1)
- Vanuatu (1)
- Venezuela (1)
- Vietnam (2)
- Zimbabwe (2)

== Medal summary ==
=== Medal table ===
Rank	Nation	Gold	Silver	Bronze	Total
1	Great Britain	3	2	0	5
2	Germany	2	1	0	3
2	New Zealand	2	1	0	3
4	Australia	1	2	0	3
5	Netherlands	1	1	1	3
6	Croatia	1	1	0	2
6	United States	1	1	0	2
8	France	1	0	1	2
8	Poland	1	0	1	2
10	Switzerland	1	0	0	1
11	Denmark	0	1	1	2
11	Lithuania	0	1	1	2
13	Canada	0	1	0	1
13	Ireland	0	1	0	1
13	South Africa	0	1	0	1
16	China	0	0	2	2
16	Italy	0	0	2	2
16	Norway	0	0	2	2
19	Czech Republic	0	0	1	1
19	Estonia	0	0	1	1
19	Romania	0	0	1	1
Totals (21 entries)		14	14	14	42

=== Men's events ===
Games	Gold	Silver	Bronze
Single sculls	Mahé Drysdale; New Zealand	Damir Martin; Croatia	Ondřej Synek; Czech Republic
Double sculls	Martin Sinković and Valent Sinković; Croatia	Mindaugas Griškonis and Saulius Ritter; Lithuania	Kjetil Borch and Olaf Tufte; Norway
Quadruple sculls	Germany; Philipp Wende; Lauritz Schoof; Karl Schulze; Hans Gruhne	Australia; Karsten Forsterling; Alexander Belonogoff; Cameron Girdlestone; James McRae	Estonia; Andrei Jämsä; Allar Raja; Tõnu Endrekson; Kaspar Taimsoo
Coxless pair	Eric Murray and Hamish Bond; New Zealand	Lawrence Brittain and Shaun Keeling; South Africa	Marco Di Costanzo and Giovanni Abagnale; Italy
Coxless four	Great Britain; Alex Gregory; Moe Sbihi; George Nash; Constantine Louloudis	Australia; Will Lockwood; Josh Dunkley-Smith; Josh Booth; Alexander Hill	Italy; Domenico Montrone; Matteo Castaldo; Matteo Lodo; Giuseppe Vicino
Coxed eight	Great Britain; Paul Bennett; Scott Durant; Matt Gotrel; Matt Langridge; Tom Ransley; Pete Reed; Will Satch; Andrew Triggs Hodge; Phelan Hill	Germany; Maximilian Munski; Malte Jakschik; Andreas Kuffner; Eric Johannesen; Maximilian Reinelt; Felix Drahotta; Richard Schmidt; Hannes Ocik; Martin Sauer	Netherlands; Kaj Hendriks; Robert Lücken; Boaz Meylink; Boudewijn Röell; Olivier Siegelaar; Dirk Uittenbogaard; Mechiel Versluis; Tone Wieten; Peter Wiersum
Lightweight double sculls	Pierre Houin and Jérémie Azou; France	Gary O'Donovan and Paul O'Donovan; Ireland	Kristoffer Brun and Are Strandli; Norway
Lightweight coxless four	Switzerland; Lucas Tramèr; Simon Schürch; Simon Niepmann; Mario Gyr	Denmark; Jacob Barsøe; Jacob Larsen; Kasper Winther Jørgensen; Morten Jørgensen	France; Franck Solforosi; Thomas Baroukh; Guillaume Raineau; Thibault Colard

=== Women's events ===
Games	Gold	Silver	Bronze
Single sculls	Kim Brennan; Australia	Genevra Stone; United States	Duan Jingli; China
Double sculls	Magdalena Fularczyk and Natalia Madaj; Poland	Victoria Thornley and Katherine Grainger; Great Britain	Donata Vištartaitė and Milda Valčiukaitė; Lithuania
Quadruple sculls	Germany; Annekatrin Thiele; Carina Bär; Julia Lier; Lisa Schmidla	Netherlands; Chantal Achterberg; Nicole Beukers; Inge Janssen; Carline Bouw	Poland; Maria Springwald; Joanna Leszczyńska; Agnieszka Kobus; Monika Ciaciuch
Coxless pair	Helen Glover and Heather Stanning; Great Britain	Genevieve Behrent and Rebecca Scown; New Zealand	Hedvig Rasmussen and Anne Andersen; Denmark
Coxed eight	United States; Emily Regan; Kerry Simmonds; Amanda Polk; Lauren Schmetterling; Tessa Gobbo; Meghan Musnicki; Elle Logan; Amanda Elmore; Katelin Snyder	Great Britain; Katie Greves; Melanie Wilson; Frances Houghton; Polly Swann; Jessica Eddie; Olivia Carnegie-Brown; Karen Bennett; Zoe Lee; Zoe de Toledo	Romania; Roxana Cogianu; Ioana Strungaru; Mihaela Petrilă; Iuliana Popa; Mădălina Beres; Laura Oprea; Adelina Boguș; Andreea Boghian; Daniela Druncea
Lightweight double sculls	Ilse Paulis and Maaike Head; Netherlands	Lindsay Jennerich and Patricia Obee; Canada	Huang Wenyi and Pan Feihong; China

== See also ==
- Rowing at the 2016 Summer Paralympics
