= Isaac Grainger =

New Zealand rower

Personal information
- Nationality: New Zealand
- Born: 26 May 1992 (age 34)
- Weight: 105 kg (231 lb)

Isaac Grainger (born 26 May 1992) is a New Zealand rower. He came fourth at the 2015 World Rowing Championships with the men's eight, qualifying the boat for the 2016 Olympics. He came sixth with his team at the eight competition in Rio de Janeiro.
