= Brook Robertson =

New Zealand rower

Personal information
- Born: 19 February 1994 (age 32) Nelson, New Zealand
- Height: 194 cm (6 ft 4 in)
- Weight: 90 kg (198 lb)

Sport
- Country: New Zealand
- Sport: Rowing

Brook Robertson (born 19 February 1994) is a New Zealand rower.

Born in Nelson, Robertson was educated at Nelson College from 2005 to 2011. He came fourth at the 2015 World Rowing Championships with the men's eight, qualifying the boat for the 2016 Olympics. He came sixth with his team at the eights competition in Rio de Janeiro.
