= Maximilian Reinelt =

German rower and physician (1988–2019)

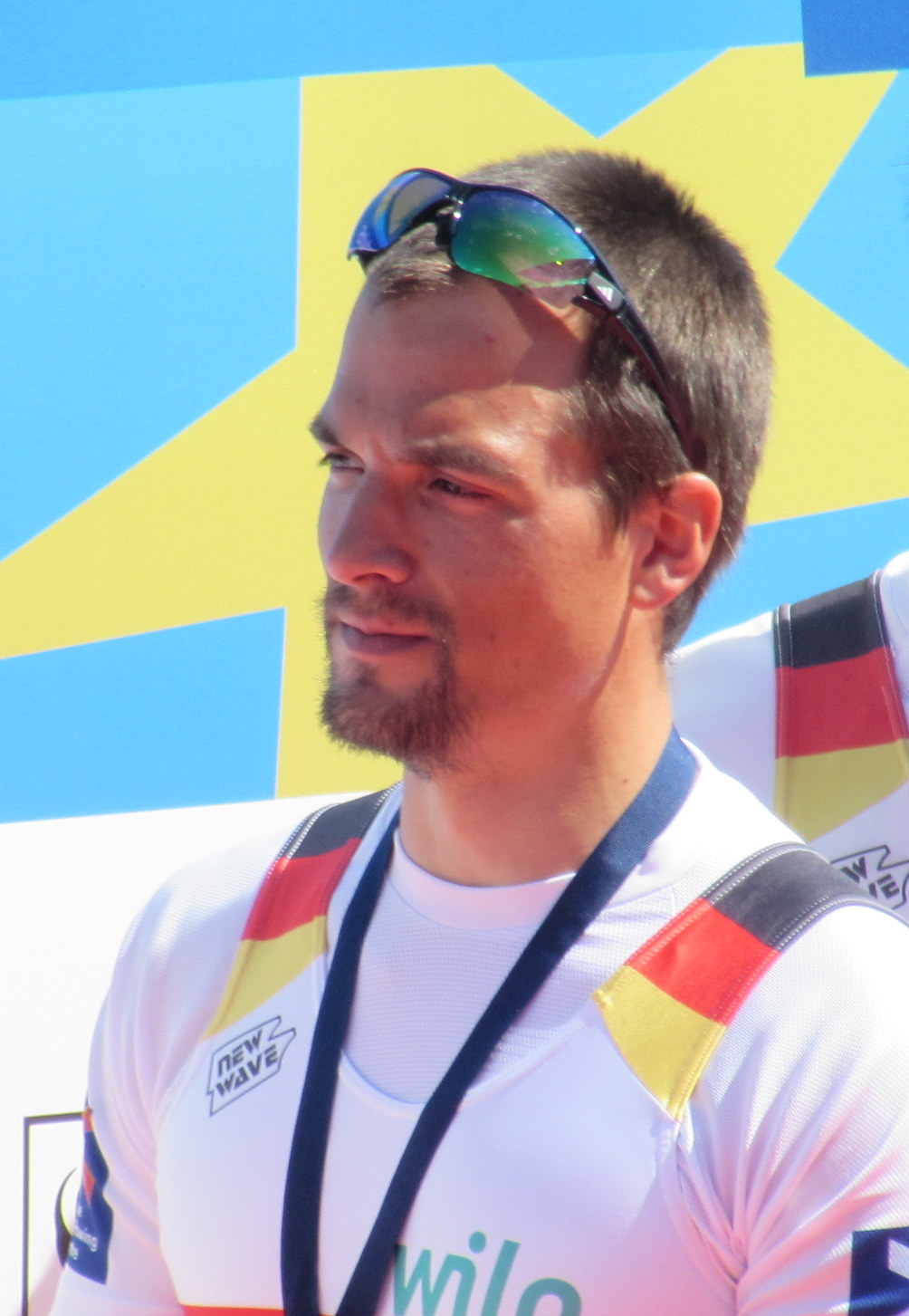
- Reinelt in 2016

Personal information
- Born: 24 August 1988 Ulm, West Germany
- Died: 9 February 2019 (aged 30) St. Moritz, Switzerland
Medal record
Men's rowing
Representing Germany
Olympic Games
Gold medal – first place	2012 London	M8+
Silver medal – second place	2016 Rio de Janeiro	M8+
World Championships
Gold medal – first place	2010 Karapiro	M8+
Gold medal – first place	2011 Bled	M8+
Silver medal – second place	2013 Chungju	M8+
Silver medal – second place	2014 Amsterdam	M8+
Silver medal – second place	2015 Aiguebelette	M8+
European Championships
Gold medal – first place	2013 Seville	M8+
Gold medal – first place	2014 Belgrade	M8+
Gold medal – first place	2015 Poznan	M8+
Gold medal – first place	2016 Brandenburg	M8+

Maximilian Reinelt (24 August 1988 – 9 February 2019) was a German rower and physician. He won a gold medal at the 2012 Summer Olympics, and a silver medal at the 2016 Summer Olympics, as well as two World Championships and four European Championships. In 2016, he was awarded the Silbernes Lorbeerblatt, Germany's highest sports award.

== Career ==
Reneilt started rowing for Germany as a junior in 2006. He finished second in three U23 World Championship events. In 2010, he was promoted to the senior boat by coach Ralf Holtmeyer.

Reinelt was part of the team that won the gold medal in the men's eight competition at the 2012 Summer Olympics in London. It was Germany's first gold medal in the event since 1988. He also won gold in the men's eight at the 2010 and 2011 World Championships and the 2013, 2014, 2015, and 2016 European Championships, and silver at the 2013, 2014, and 2015 World Championships. He was also part of a German team that won a record 36 consecutive races. At the 2016 Summer Olympics in Rio de Janeiro, he competed as part of Germany's men's eight team which won the silver medal. The eight rowers were awarded the Silbernes Lorbeerblatt (Silver Laurel Leaf), Germany's highest sports award, for their achievement. It was Reinelt's second such award having been similarly recognised for his 2012 Olympic gold.

After the 2016 Olympics, Reinelt retired to focus on studying medicine in Bochum. He was one of three rowers from the German 2016 Olympic team who retired after the Games, the others being Andreas Kuffner and Maximilian Munski. In early 2019, Reinelt became doctor of the Germany U23 rowing squad. He had been scheduled to attend their rowing camp in Mequinenza, Spain.

== Death ==
On 9 February 2019, Reinelt died whilst skiing in St. Moritz, Switzerland, with his fiancée. Resuscitation attempts failed, and his death was announced by Graubuenden police. Speaking about Reinelt's death, IOC president Thomas Bach said "Maximilian Reinelt is one of the great athletes of German rowing and beyond that a very likeable person, who has managed to combine competitive sports and his vocational training as a doctor with great success." According to the autopsy, Reinelt was suffering from Sarcoidosis, which remained asymptomatic. The Sarcoidosis was responsible for the Arrhythmia, that caused sudden cardiac death.
