= Christopher Liwski =

American rower (born 1980)

Personal information
- Born: Christopher Donald Liwski; April 21, 1980 (age 46) Montreal, Quebec, Canada
- Education: Syracuse University (BA); University of Oxford (MS); Boston College (JD)
Medal record
Representing United States
Rowing
World Rowing Championships
Gold medal – first place	2007 Munich	4+
Bronze medal – third place	2006 Eton	8+
Pan American Games
Gold medal – first place	2003 Santo Domingo	8+

Christopher Donald Liwski (born April 21, 1980) is a Canadian American rower, a six-time U.S. National Team member, a double World medalist, and a two-time member of the United States Olympic Rowing Team.

== Career ==
=== Early life and education ===
Liwski was born in Montreal, Quebec, Canada. He attended Syracuse University as an undergraduate. He then began his legal education at the Syracuse University College of Law, before enrolling in St Catherine's College of Oxford University, where he undertook a Master of Science degree in Water Science, Policy and Management. Liwski then returned to the U.S. where he completed his J.D. degree at Boston College Law School.

=== Other activities ===
From 2008 to 2015 he served as the director & legal chair of the board of directors of the United States Rowing Association. From 2017 to 2018 he served on the board of trustees of the Visiting Nurses Association of Princeton, New Jersey.

=== Legal career ===
Liwski practices law in the United States. He began his legal career as an attorney with the legal department of Johnson & Johnson and later worked for Drinker Biddle & Reath. Liwski previously served as Head of Legal, North America at Opella consumer healthcare and now serves as General Counsel for North America and Global Commercial operations at Haleon.

=== Collegiate Rowing ===
Liwski rowed for the Syracuse University Crew for four years as an undergraduate, was the recipient of the David Godfrey Award in his senior year, and has been inducted into the Syracuse Athletics Rowing Hall of Fame.

Also, just hours after competing in the 2005 World Cup event at Dorney Lake, Eton, Liwski made a guest appearance in St Catherine's College first VIII, which was competing in the Oxford University Summer Eights. He was joined in that crew by fellow international competitors Andrew Triggs Hodge and Colin Smith. They defeated their opposition, Hertford College.

==== The Boat Race ====
Whilst at Oxford University, Liwski was a member of Oxford University Boat Club and took part in the Boat Race in 2005, marking the 151st racing of the prestigious annual event. Both universities had extremely strong intakes that year, with Cambridge boasting several world champions and the Oxford crew including Olympic silver medallist Barney Williams, and now famed British oarsmen, and three-time Olympic Gold Medalists, Andrew Triggs Hodge and Pete Reed. Oxford, with Liwski in the five seat, won the contest by two lengths in a time of 16 minutes 42 seconds. To date, the 2005 Oxford Blue Boat marks the heaviest crew weight of all time.

=== International rowing career ===
Liwski won his first international gold medal in 2002 at the three seat of the United States 8+ in the Nations Cup World Championships. He then won gold again in the United States 8+ at the 2003 Pan-American Games. Liwski sat in the five seat of the United States 8+, which came fourth in the final World Cup event before the Athens Olympics, but rowed as the Olympic team spare by the time the crew went on to win Gold in Athens. A year later he competed internationally again, this time at the World Cup event at Dorney Lake, Eton. Liwski, and Oxford crewmate Michael Blomquist, finished ninth there in the coxless pair.

In 2006, Liwski competed at the World Championships rowing at the five seat in the United States 8+, which won a bronze medal behind Germany and Italy. Competing again at the 2007 World Championships, Liwski stroked the U.S. Men’s 4+ to a gold medal.

In 2008, Liwski was once again named as alternate on the men's sweep team for the Beijing Olympics.

== Achievements ==
=== Olympics ===
- Beijing Olympics – Team Member (starboard alternate)
- Athens Olympics – Team Member (starboard alternate)

=== World Championships ===
- 2007 Munich – Gold, US 4+ (Stroke)
- 2006 Eton – Bronze, US 8+ (Five)

=== World Cups ===
- 2005 Eton – 9th, US 2- (Bow)
- 2004 Lucerne – 4th, US 8+ (Five)

=== International competition ===
- 2003 Pan American Games – Gold, US 8+ (Five); 4th, US 2- (Bow)
- 2002 Under-23 World Championships – Gold, US 8+ (Three)

=== Nationally ===
- 2006 Nationals – Gold, PTC 8+
- 2007 Nationals – Gold, PTC 8+; Silver, PTC 4-
