= Andreas Kuffner =

Andreas Kuffner is the name of:

- Andreas Kuffner (Luftwaffe), recipient of Knight's Cross of the Iron Cross
- Andreas Kuffner (rower) (born 1987), German rower
