= Hans Struzyna =

American rower

Personal information
- Born: March 31, 1989 (age 37) Seattle, Washington, U.S.

Sport
- Sport: Rowing

Hans Struzyna (born March 31, 1989) is an American rower. He competed in the men's eight event at the 2016 Summer Olympics, finishing in fourth place.

Struzyna graduated from the University of Washington in 2011 with a degree in business.
