= Gold Fever (British TV series) =

2000 BBC documentary

Gold Fever is a BBC documentary, shown in August 2000, which follows Steve Redgrave and his British rowing coxless four teammates Matthew Pinsent, Tim Foster and James Cracknell in the years leading up to the Sydney Olympics, where Redgrave was looking to win his fifth consecutive gold medal. The three-part series includes video diaries recording the highs and lows in the quest for gold. Among these were Redgrave being diagnosed with diabetes, and Foster possibly losing his spot on the team after injuring his hand punching a window at a party, and later undergoing back surgery that required additional months of recovery time. Coach Jurgen Grobler is also featured in the programme.

A follow-up documentary programme titled The Rowers Return was produced in the aftermath of the Sydney Olympics. The title was part-reference to a fictional public house, The Rovers Return, a venue in the long-running British soap opera Coronation Street. The documentary detailed the crew's return to the UK and completed the Gold Fever story.
