= Eric Johannesen =

German rower (born 1988)

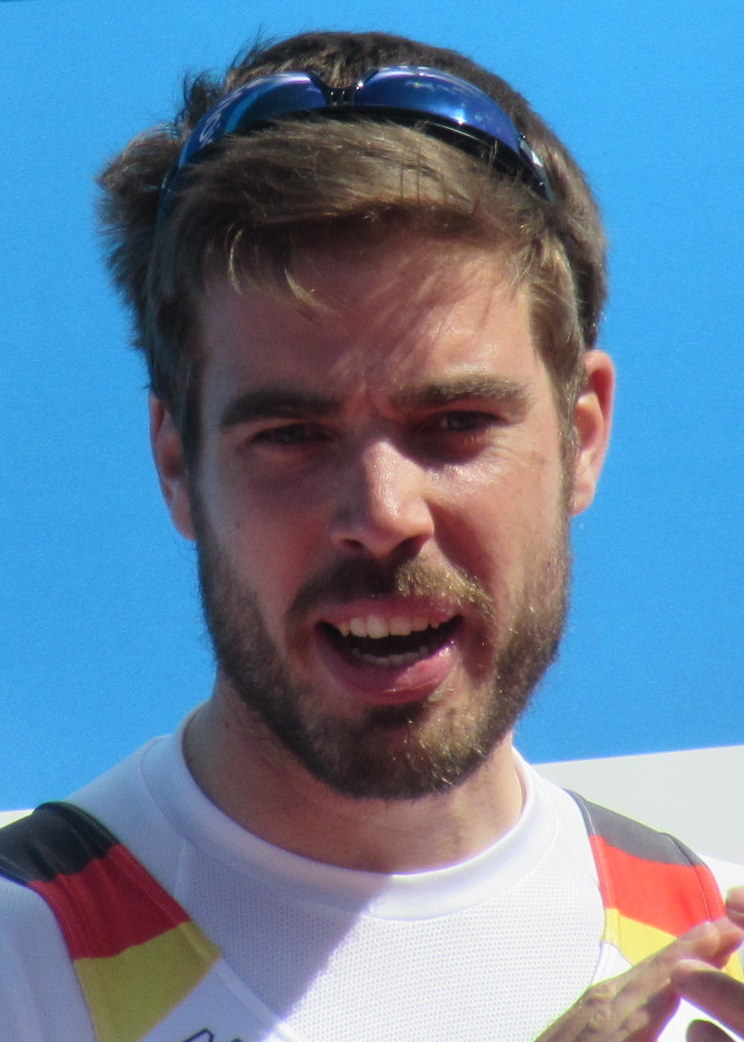
- Johannesen in 2016

Personal information
- Born: 16 July 1988 (age 37) Oberhausen, West Germany
Medal record
Men's rowing
Representing Germany
Olympic Games
Gold medal – first place	2012 London	M8+
Silver medal – second place	2016 Rio de Janeiro	M8+
World Rowing Championships
Gold medal – first place	2011 Bled	M8+
Silver medal – second place	2013 Chungju	M8+
Silver medal – second place	2014 Amsterdam	M8+
Silver medal – second place	2015 Aiguebelette	M8+
European Championships
Gold medal – first place	2014 Belgrade	M8+

Eric Johannesen (born 16 July 1988) is a German former representative rower. He is a dual Olympian, an Olympic gold medallist and was a 2011 world champion.

He was in the crew that won the gold medal in the men's eight competition at the 2012 Summer Olympics in London. At the 2016 Summer Olympics in Rio de Janeiro, he rowed in the German men's eight which won the silver medal.

== Personal ==
Johannesen was born in Oberhausen, West Germany. His club rowing was from the Bergedorf Rowing Club till 2017 and then the Favorite Hammonia Rowing Club. His younger brother Torben Johannesen is also an Olympic and world champion rower.

Johannesen along with the other eight 2016 Olympic silver medal rowers was awarded the Silbernes Lorbeerblatt (Silver Laurel Leaf), Germany's highest sports award, for the achievement. It was Reinelt's second such award having been similarly recognised for his 2012 Olympic gold.
