= Sam Dommer =

American rower (born 1991)

Personal information
- Born: September 4, 1991 (age 34)

Sport
- Sport: Rowing

Sam Dommer (born September 4, 1991) is an American rower. He competed in the men's eight event at the 2016 Summer Olympics.
