= Austin Hack =

American rower (born 1992)

Personal information
- Nationality: American
- Born: May 17, 1992 (age 34) Springfield Massachusetts
- Education: Stanford University (B.A.)
- Height: 6 ft 8 in (203 cm)
- Weight: 220 lb (100 kg)

Sport
- Country: United States
- Sport: Rowing

Austin Hack (born May 17, 1992, in Springfield, Massachusetts) is an American rower. He grew up in Old Lyme, Connecticut and competed in the men's eight event at the 2016 Summer Olympics. He rowed for Stanford University under coach Craig Amerkhanian, graduating in 2014 with a B.A. in Political Science.

In June 2021, he qualified to represent the United States at the 2020 Summer Olympics, placing 4th in the men's eight.
