= Robert Fuchs (rower) =

Polish rower (born 1991)

Personal information
- Nationality: Polish
- Born: 12 June 1991 (age 35)

Sport
- Sport: Rowing
Medal record
Representing Poland
World Championships
Bronze medal – third place	2014 Amsterdam	M8+

Robert Fuchs (born 12 June 1991) is a Polish competitive rower.

He competed at the 2016 Summer Olympics in Rio de Janeiro, in the men's eight.
