= Boaz Meylink =

Dutch rower (born 1984)

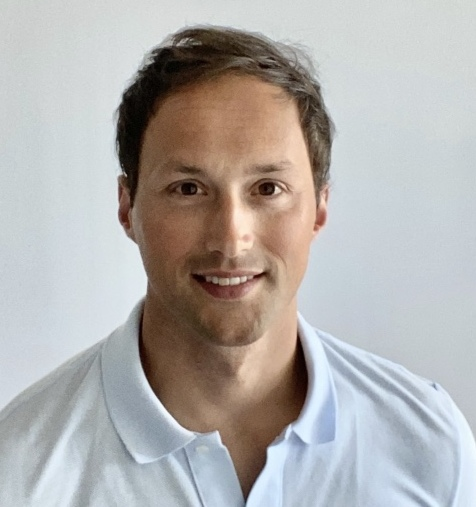
- 2020

Personal information
- Full name: Boaz Cornelius Meylink
- Nationality: Dutch
- Born: 22 March 1984 (age 42) Deventer, Netherlands
- Height: 195 cm (6 ft 5 in)
- Weight: 93 kg (205 lb)
Medal record
Men's rowing
Representing the Netherlands
Olympic Games
Bronze medal – third place	2016 Rio de Janeiro	M8+
World Championships
Gold medal – first place	2013 Chungju	M4-
Bronze medal – third place	2015 Aiguebelette	M8+
European Championships
Gold medal – first place	2013 Seville	M4-
Bronze medal – third place	2017 Racice	M8+

Boaz Cornelius Meylink (born 22 March 1984 in Deventer) is a Dutch Olympic rower. He competed at the 2012 Summer Olympics in London and the 2016 Summer Olympics in Rio de Janeiro. At the 2016 Summer Olympics in Rio de Janeiro he was part of the men's eight team that won a bronze medal.

In 2013 he became European Champion and World Champion in the men's coxless four. Through the years he won several World Cup medals in the men's eight and men's coxless four.

He finished 5th in the coxless four at the 2012 Summer Olympics in London.
