= Mechiel Versluis =

Dutch rower (born 1987)

Personal information
- Nationality: Dutch
- Born: 29 July 1987 (age 38) Ooststellingwerf, Netherlands
- Height: 1.95 m (6 ft 5 in)
- Weight: 90 kg (198 lb)

Sport
- Country: Netherlands
- Sport: Rowing
- Event(s): Coxless four, Eight

Achievements and titles
- Olympic finals: London 2012 M4- Tokyo 2016 M8+ Tokyo 2020 M8+
Medal record
Men's rowing
Representing the Netherlands
Olympic Games
Bronze medal – third place	2016 Rio de Janeiro	Eight
World Championships
Gold medal – first place	2013 Chungjiu	Coxless four
Silver medal – second place	2019 Ottensheim	Eight
Bronze medal – third place	2015 Aiguebelette	Eight
European Championships
Gold medal – first place	2013 Seville	Coxless four
Silver medal – second place	2018 Glasgow	Eight
Bronze medal – third place	2017 Račice	Eight
Bronze medal – third place	2019 Lucerne	Eight

Mechiel Versluis (born 29 July 1987) is a Dutch representative rower. He is a three time Olympian, an Olympic bronze medallist and was a world and European champion in 2013 in the coxless four

He finished fifth in the coxless four at the 2012 Summer Olympics. At the 2016 Summer Olympics in Rio de Janeiro he was part of the men's eight team that won a bronze medal. He won a medal at the 2019 World Rowing Championships.
