= Boudewijn Röell =

Dutch rower (born 1989)

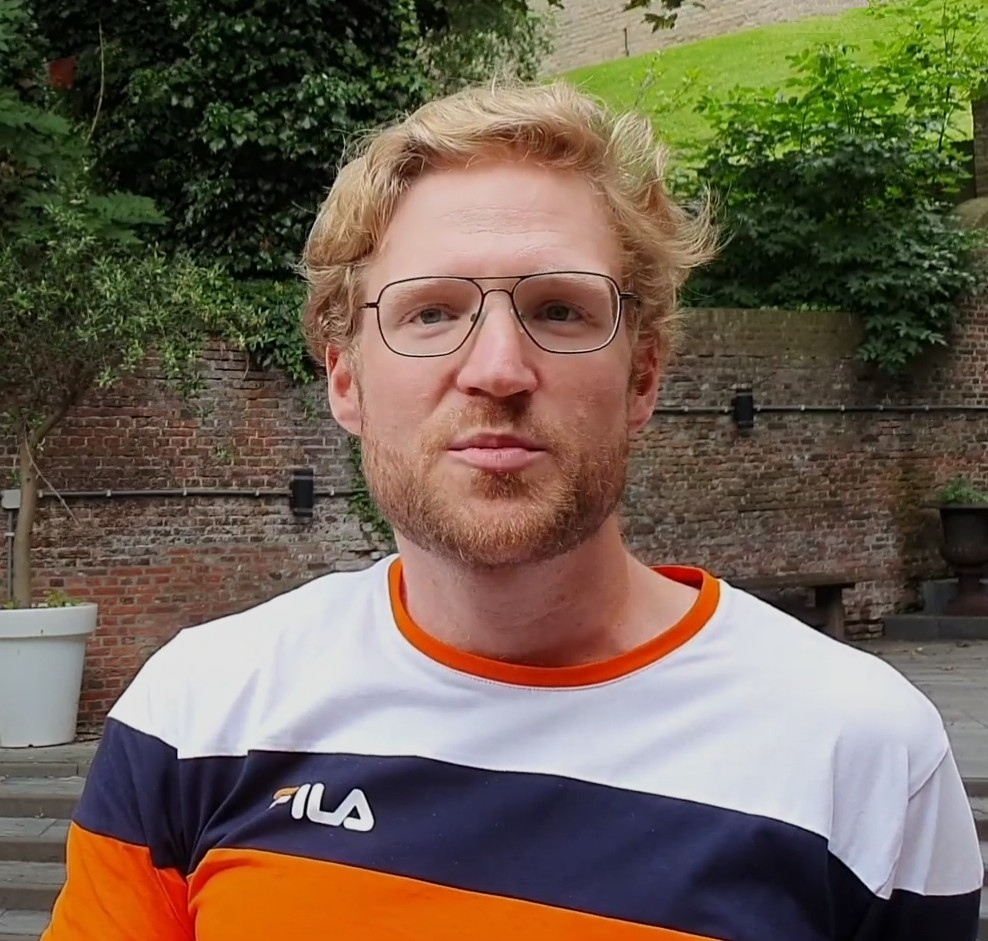

Personal information
- Full name: Willem Frederik Boudewijn Röell
- Born: 12 May 1989 (age 37) Leidschendam, Netherlands
- Height: 195 cm (6 ft 5 in)
- Weight: 100 kg (220 lb)
Medal record
Men's rowing
Representing the Netherlands
Olympic Games
Bronze medal – third place	2016 Rio de Janeiro	Eight
World Championships
Bronze medal – third place	2015 Aiguebelette	Eight
European Championships
Gold medal – first place	2020 Poznan	Coxless four
Silver medal – second place	2018 Glasgow	Eight
Bronze medal – third place	2013 Seville	Eight
Bronze medal – third place	2019 Lucerne	Eight

Willem Frederik Boudewijn Röell (born 12 May 1989 in Leidschendam) is a Dutch rower. He is a dual Olympian and a representative at World Rowing Championships. He won the bronze medal in the eight at the 2015 World Rowing Championships and in the eight at the 2016 Summer Olympics in Rio de Janeiro. He raced in the men's coxless four at Tokyo 2021 and finished in sixth place.
