= Michael di Santo =

American rower (born 1989)

Personal information
- Born: December 10, 1989 (age 36)

Sport
- Sport: Rowing

Michael di Santo (born December 10, 1989) is an American rower. He competed in the men's eight event at the 2016 Summer Olympics. He rowed collegiately at Harvard University.

An alumnus of the University of Oxford, di Santo raced and won the 2014, 2015, and 2017 Oxford-Cambridge Boat Race, the final one as president of Oxford University Boat Club.
