= Felix Heinemann =

German rower

Personal information
- Born: 10 December 1996 (age 29)

Sport
- Sport: Rowing
Medal record
Men's rowing
Representing Germany
World Rowing Championships
Gold medal – first place	2015 Aiguebelette	Lwt eight

Felix Heinemann (born 10 December 1996) is a German coxswain. He won a gold medal at the 2015 World Rowing Championships in Aiguebelette with the lightweight men's eight.
