= Tobias Schad =

German rower

Personal information
- Born: 24 July 1991 (age 34)

Sport
- Sport: Rowing
Medal record
Men's rowing
Representing Germany
World Rowing Championships
| Gold medal – first place | 2015 Aiguebelette | Lwt eight |

Tobias Schad (born 24 July 1991) is a German lightweight rower. He won a gold medal at the 2015 World Rowing Championships in Aiguebelette with the lightweight men's eight.
