= Robert Munn (rower) =

American rower (born 1990)

Robert Munn (born July 26, 1990) is an American rower. He was part of the American boat in the men's eight event at the 2016 Summer Olympics.
