= Stewart Innes =

British rower

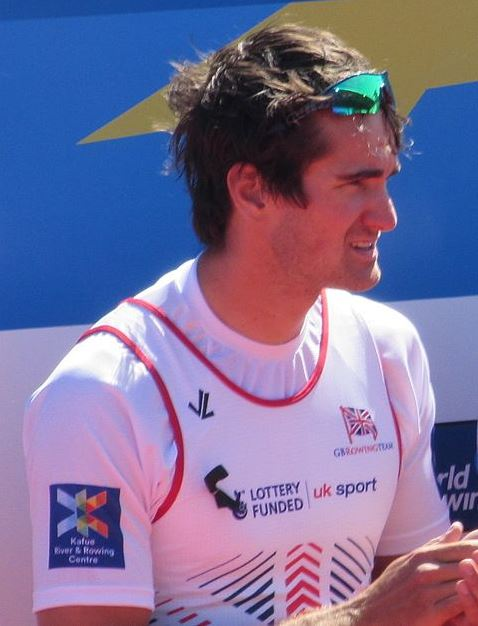
- Innes in 2016

Personal information
- Born: 20 May 1991 (age 35)

Sport
- Sport: Rowing

Stewart Innes (born 20 May 1991) is a retired British rower.

== Career ==
Innes took up rowing as a pupil at St Edward's School, Oxford and later competed for Durham University as an undergraduate, and for Reading University as a postgraduate.

He was part of the British team that topped the medal table at the 2015 World Rowing Championships at Lac d'Aiguebelette in France, where he won a bronze medal as part of the coxless four with Scott Durant, Alan Sinclair and Tom Ransley.

He competed in the men's coxless pair event, with Alan Sinclair, at the 2016 Summer Olympics.

After finishing 3rd at the 2019 GB Rowing Team Trials, Innes had been set to compete at the 2020 Summer Olympics in Tokyo but following the postponement of the games, he announced his retirement from international rowing in October 2020.

== Personal life ==
His father Duncan Innes rowed and won a gold medal at the 1977 World Rowing Championships.
