= Matthias Arnold =

Austrian professional footballer

Personal information
- Date of birth: 2 March 1997 (age 29)
- Place of birth: Klagenfurt, Austria
- Height: 1.74 m (5 ft 8 1/2 in)
- Position: Striker

Team information
- Current team: Austria Klagenfurt
- Number: 23

Youth career
- 2003–2007: FC KAC
- 2007–2010: Austria Kärnten
- 2010–2011: Austria Klagenfurt
- 2011–2014: AKA Kärnten
- 2014–2015: Wolfsberger AC

Senior career*
Years	Team	Apps	(Gls)
2014–2015	Wolfsberger II	2	(0)
2015–	Austria Klagenfurt	1	(0)
- * Club domestic league appearances and goals as of 31 May 2016

Matthias Arnold (born 2 March 1997) is an Austrian professional footballer, who plays as a striker for Austria Klagenfurt in the Austrian Football First League.

== Youth career ==
In 2003 Arnold began his career, in his hometown at the Klagenfurt AC.

In 2007, he moved to Austria Kärnten.

In 2010, after his bankruptcy, he played for Austria Klagenfurt, before he went into the AKA Kärnten 2011th In May 2014.

He completed a game in the Regionalliga for Austria Klagenfurt.

He then played in the AKA Wolfsberger.

== Senior career ==
In October 2014, he completed the first time a game for the second team of Wolfsberger AC.

In the summer of 2015 he returned to Austria Klagenfurt, who had since been promoted to the second division.

== Professional career ==
In May 2016 he made his professional debut, when he came on in the home game against SKN St. Pölten in the closing stages. With Austria, he had to descend to the season forced the Regionalliga.
