= Maximilian Munski =

German rower (born 1988)

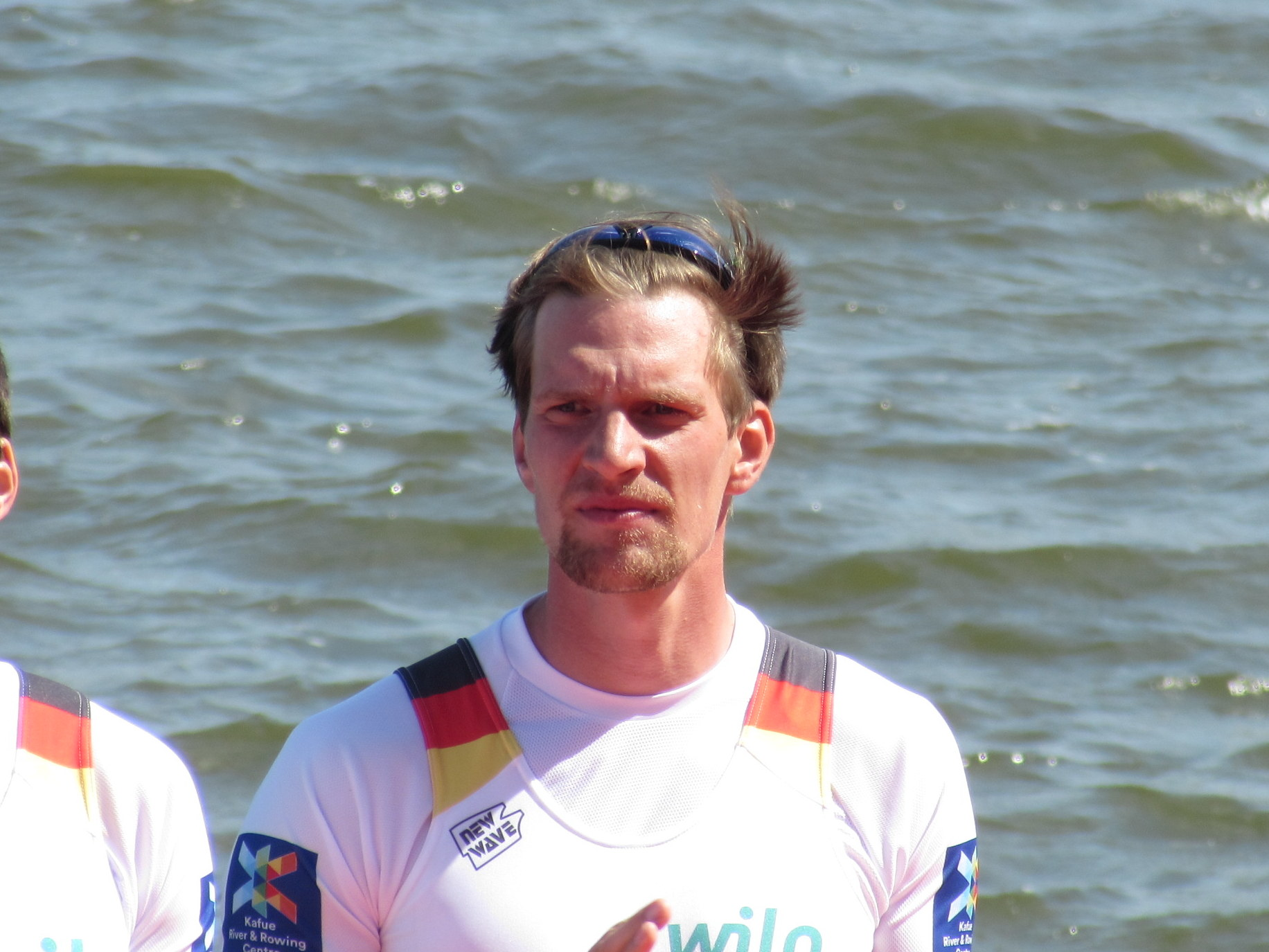

Personal information
- Born: 10 January 1988 (age 38) Lübeck, West Germany
Medal record
Men's Rowing
Representing Germany
Olympic Games
Silver medal – second place	2016 Rio de Janeiro	M8+
World Championships
Silver medal – second place	2013 Chungju	M8+
Silver medal – second place	2015 Aiguebelette	M8+
Bronze medal – third place	2010 Karapiro	M2+
European Championships
Gold medal – first place	2013 Seville	M8+
Gold medal – first place	2015 Poznan	M8+

Maximilian Munski (born 10 January 1988) is a German former representative rower. He is an Olympian, an Olympic silver medallist and was selected in German senior crews at World Rowing Championships and Rowing World Cups between 2010 and 2016.

He was in the crew that won the gold medal in the men's eight competition at the 2015 European Rowing Championships. At the 2016 Summer Olympics in Rio de Janeiro, he rowed in Germany's men's eight which won the silver medal. Those nine 2016 Olympic silver medal rowers were awarded the Silbernes Lorbeerblatt (Silver Laurel Leaf), Germany's highest sports award, for their achievements.
