= Rowing at the 2016 Summer Olympics – Men's eight =

Men's eight at the Games of the XXXI Olympiad
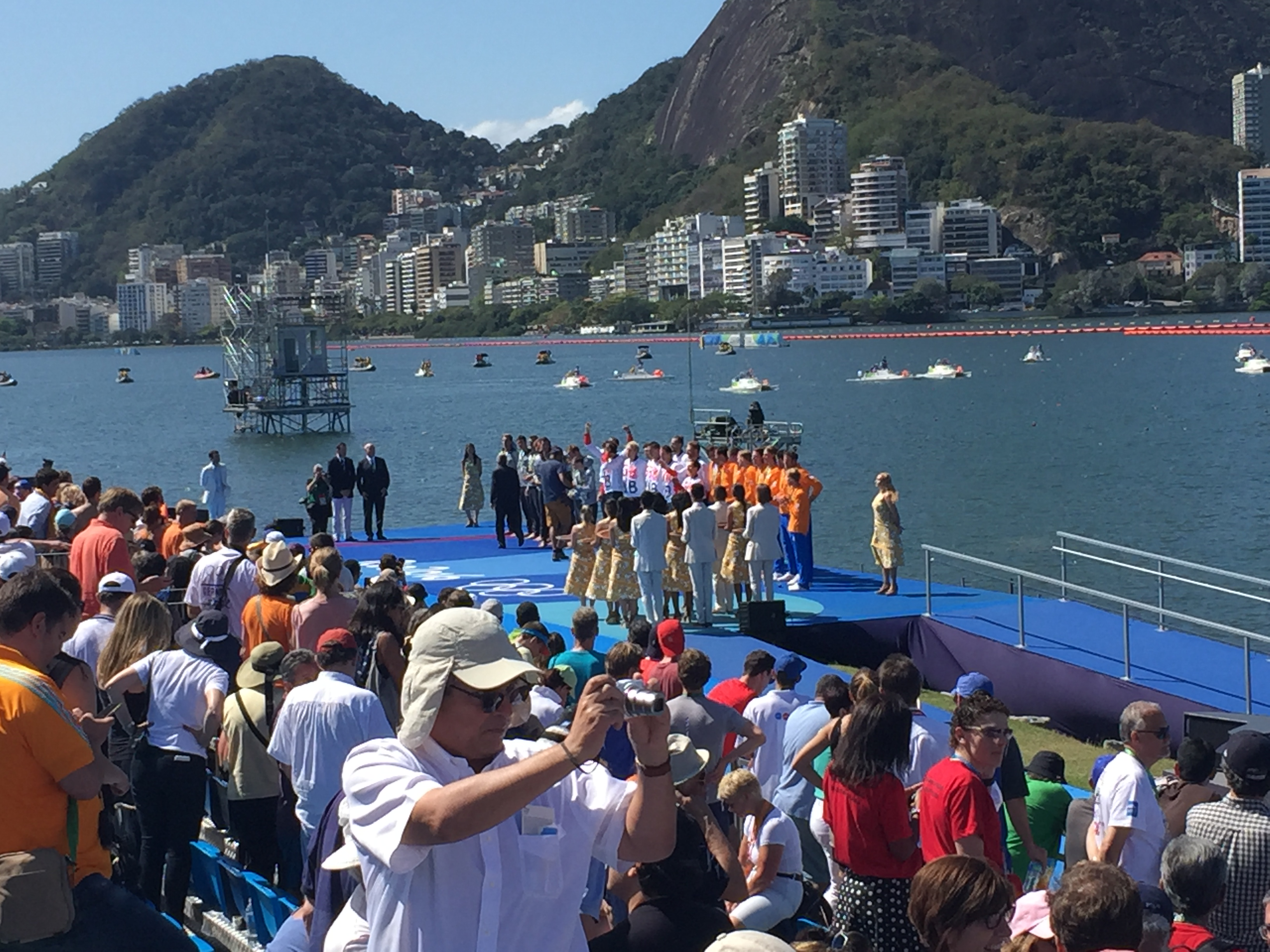
- Medal ceremony
- Venue: Rodrigo de Freitas Lagoon
- Dates: 8–13 August 2016
- Competitors: 63 from 7 nations
- Winning time: 5:29.63

Medalists
1st place, gold medalist(s)		Great Britain: Scott Durant; Tom Ransley; Andrew Triggs Hodge; Matt Gotrel; Pete Reed; Paul Bennett; Matt Langridge; Will Satch; Phelan Hill
2nd place, silver medalist(s)		Germany: Maximilian Munski; Malte Jakschik; Andreas Kuffner; Eric Johannesen; Maximilian Reinelt; Felix Drahotta; Richard Schmidt; Hannes Ocik; Martin Sauer
3rd place, bronze medalist(s)		Netherlands: Kaj Hendriks; Robert Lücken; Boaz Meylink; Boudewijn Röell; Olivier Siegelaar; Dirk Uittenbogaard; Mechiel Versluis; Tone Wieten; Peter Wiersum

The men's eight competition at the 2016 Summer Olympics in Rio de Janeiro took place at the Rodrigo de Freitas Lagoon. It was held from 8 to 13 August. There were 7 boats (63 competitors) from 7 nations. The event was won by Great Britain, the nation's first victory in the men's eight since 2000 and fourth overall (second to the United States' 12 wins). Defending champions Germany finished with silver this time. The Netherlands earned bronze.

== Background ==
This was the 27th appearance of the event. Rowing had been on the programme in 1896 but was cancelled due to bad weather. The men's eight has been held every time that rowing has been contested, beginning in 1900.

The top two contenders in 2016 were Germany—defending Olympic champion, winner of each European championship since London 2012, and runner-up at each World championship since then—and Great Britain, which had beaten Germany at each of those World championships. Both teams had six men with prior Olympic medals.

For the fourth consecutive Games, no nations made their debut in the event. Five of the seven teams had competed in all four of those Games, at least; Italy had competed in 2004, but New Zealand was making its first appearance since 1984. The United States made its 24th appearance, most among nations to that point.

== Qualification ==
Nations had been limited to one boat each since 1920. The 8 qualifiers were:

- 5 boats from the 2015 World Championships
- 3 boats from the Final Olympic Qualification Regatta

The Russian boat was excluded due to the Russian doping scandal, leaving only 7 boats to compete.

== Competition format ==
The "eight" event featured nine-person boats, with eight rowers and a coxswain. It was a sweep rowing event, with the rowers each having one oar (and thus each rowing on one side). The course used the 2000 metres distance that became the Olympic standard in 1912 (with the exception of 1948). Races were held in up to six lanes.

The competition consisted of two main rounds (semifinals and finals) as well as a repechage. The competition format was adjusted slightly due to having 7 boats, rather than the typical 8, compete; no "B" final was held.

- Semifinals: Two heats of three or four boats each. The top boat in each heat (2 boats total) advanced directly to the "A" final, while all other boats (5 total) went to the repechage.
- Repechage: A single heat of five boats. The top four boats rejoined the semifinal winners in the "A" final, with the 5th boat eliminated.
- Finals: The "A" final consisted of the top six boats, awarding medals and 4th through 6th place. With only one boat not competing in the "A" final, no "B" final was needed.

== Schedule ==
All times are Brasília Time (UTC−3).

Date	Time	Round
Monday, 8 August 2016	9:10	Semifinals
Thursday, 11 August 2016	11:00	Repechage
Saturday, 13 August 2016	11:27	Final

== Results ==
=== Semifinals ===
The winners of each heat qualified for the final, while the remainder went to the repechage.

==== Semifinal 1 ====
Rank	Rowers	Coxswain	Nation	Time	Notes
1	Scott Durant; Tom Ransley; Andrew Triggs Hodge; Matt Gotrel; Pete Reed; Paul Bennett; Matt Langridge; Will Satch	Phelan Hill	Great Britain	5:34.23	Q
2	Kaj Hendriks; Robert Lücken; Boaz Meylink; Boudewijn Röell; Olivier Siegelaar; Dirk Uittenbogaard; Mechiel Versluis; Tone Wieten	Peter Wiersum	Netherlands	5:36.16	R
3	Michael Brake; Isaac Grainger; Stephen Jones; Alex Kennedy; Shaun Kirkham; Tom Murray; Brook Robertson; Joe Wright	Caleb Shepherd	New Zealand	5:36.28	R
4	Luca Agamennoni; Vincenzo Capelli; Pierpaolo Frattini; Fabio Infimo; Emanuele Liuzzi; Mario Paonessa; Matteo Stefanini; Simone Venier	Enrico D'Aniello	Italy	5:52.83	R

==== Semifinal 2 ====
Rank	Rowers	Coxswain	Nation	Time	Notes
1	Maximilian Munski; Malte Jakschik; Andreas Kuffner; Eric Johannesen; Maximilian Reinelt; Felix Drahotta; Richard Schmidt; Hannes Ocik	Martin Sauer	Germany	5:38.22	Q
2	Sam Dommer; Hans Struzyna; Alexander Karwowski; Glenn Ochal; Stephen Kasprzyk; Michael di Santo; Robert Munn; Austin Hack	Samuel Ojserkis	United States	5:40.16	R
3	Zbigniew Schodowski; Robert Fuchs; Krystian Aranowski; Mateusz Wilangowski; Mikołaj Burda; Michał Szpakowski; Marcin Brzeziński; Piotr Juszczak	Daniel Trojanowski	Poland	5:42.32	R

=== Repechage ===
The first four advance to Final A.

Rank	Rowers	Coxswain	Nation	Time	Notes
1	Sam Dommer; Hans Struzyna; Alexander Karwowski; Glenn Ochal; Stephen Kasprzyk; Michael di Santo; Robert Munn; Austin Hack	Samuel Ojserkis	United States	5:51.13	Q
2	Kaj Hendriks; Robert Lücken; Boaz Meylink; Boudewijn Röell; Olivier Siegelaar; Dirk Uittenbogaard; Mechiel Versluis; Tone Wieten	Peter Wiersum	Netherlands	5:52.95	Q
3	Michael Brake; Isaac Grainger; Stephen Jones; Alex Kennedy; Shaun Kirkham; Tom Murray; Brook Robertson; Joe Wright	Caleb Shepherd	New Zealand	5:56.94	Q
4	Zbigniew Schodowski; Robert Fuchs; Krystian Aranowski; Mateusz Wilangowski; Mikołaj Burda; Michał Szpakowski; Marcin Brzeziński; Piotr Juszczak	Daniel Trojanowski	Poland	5:59.22	Q
5	Luca Agamennoni; Vincenzo Capelli; Pierpaolo Frattini; Fabio Infimo; Emanuele Liuzzi; Mario Paonessa; Matteo Stefanini; Simone Venier	Enrico D'Aniello	Italy	6:05.12	

=== Final ===
Rank	Rowers	Coxswain	Nation	Time
1st place, gold medalist(s)	Scott Durant; Tom Ransley; Andrew Triggs Hodge; Matt Gotrel; Pete Reed; Paul Bennett; Matt Langridge; Will Satch	Phelan Hill	Great Britain	5:29.63
2nd place, silver medalist(s)	Maximilian Munski; Malte Jakschik; Andreas Kuffner; Eric Johannesen; Maximilian Reinelt; Felix Drahotta; Richard Schmidt; Hannes Ocik	Martin Sauer	Germany	5:30.96
3rd place, bronze medalist(s)	Kaj Hendriks; Robert Lücken; Boaz Meylink; Boudewijn Röell; Olivier Siegelaar; Dirk Uittenbogaard; Mechiel Versluis; Tone Wieten	Peter Wiersum	Netherlands	5:31.59
4	Sam Dommer; Hans Struzyna; Alexander Karwowski; Glenn Ochal; Stephen Kasprzyk; Michael di Santo; Robert Munn; Austin Hack	Samuel Ojserkis	United States	5:34.23
5	Zbigniew Schodowski; Robert Fuchs; Krystian Aranowski; Mateusz Wilangowski; Mikołaj Burda; Michał Szpakowski; Marcin Brzeziński; Piotr Juszczak	Daniel Trojanowski	Poland	5:34.62
6	Michael Brake; Isaac Grainger; Stephen Jones; Alex Kennedy; Shaun Kirkham; Tom Murray; Brook Robertson; Joe Wright	Caleb Shepherd	New Zealand	5:36.64
