= Robert Lücken =

Dutch rower (born 1985)

Personal information
- Nationality: Dutch
- Born: 30 April 1985 (age 41) Amsterdam, Netherlands
- Height: 1.99 m (6 ft 6 in)
- Weight: 94 kg (207 lb)

Sport
- Country: Netherlands
- Sport: Rowing
- Event(s): Coxless four, Eight
Medal record
Men's rowing
Representing the Netherlands
Olympic Games
Bronze medal – third place	2016 Rio de Janeiro	Eight
World Championships
Gold medal – first place	2013 Chungjiu	Coxless four
Silver medal – second place	2019 Ottensheim	Eight
Bronze medal – third place	2015 Aiguebelette	Eight
Bronze medal – third place	2009 Poznań	Eight
European Championships
Gold medal – first place	2013 Seville	Coxless four
Bronze medal – third place	2019 Lucerne	Eight
Bronze medal – third place	2017 Račice	Eight

Robert Lücken (transliterated Luecken, born 30 April 1985) is a Dutch rower. He won with the Dutch team a gold medal in the M4- at the 2013 World Rowing Championships and became Amsterdam Sportsman of the year in 2013. At the 2016 Summer Olympics in Rio de Janeiro he was part of the Men's eight team that won a bronze medal.
