= Kaj Hendriks =

Dutch rower (born 1987)

Personal information
- Nationality: Dutch
- Born: 19 August 1987 (age 38) Wageningen, Netherlands
- Height: 197 cm (6 ft 6 in)
- Weight: 95 kg (209 lb)
Medal record
Men's rowing
Representing the Netherlands
Olympic Games
Bronze medal – third place	2016 Rio de Janeiro	M8+
World Championships
Gold medal – first place	2013 Chungjiu	M4-
Bronze medal – third place	2015 Aiguebelette	M8+
European Championships
Gold medal – first place	2013 Seville	M4-

Kaj Hendriks (born 19 August 1987 in Wageningen) is a Dutch rower. He finished 5th in the coxless four at the 2012 Summer Olympics and became a world champion in the coxless four at the 2013 World Rowing Championships in Chungjiu. At the 2016 Summer Olympics in Rio de Janeiro he was part of the men's eight team that won a bronze medal.
