= Andreas Kuffner (rower) =

German rower (born 1987)

Medal record

Men's rowing

Representing Germany

Olympic Games
Gold medal – first place	2012 London	M8+
Silver medal – second place	2016 Rio de Janeiro	M8+

World Championships
Gold medal – first place	2011 Bled	M8+
Silver medal – second place	2014 Amsterdam	M8+

European Championships
Gold medal – first place	2014 Belgrade	M8+

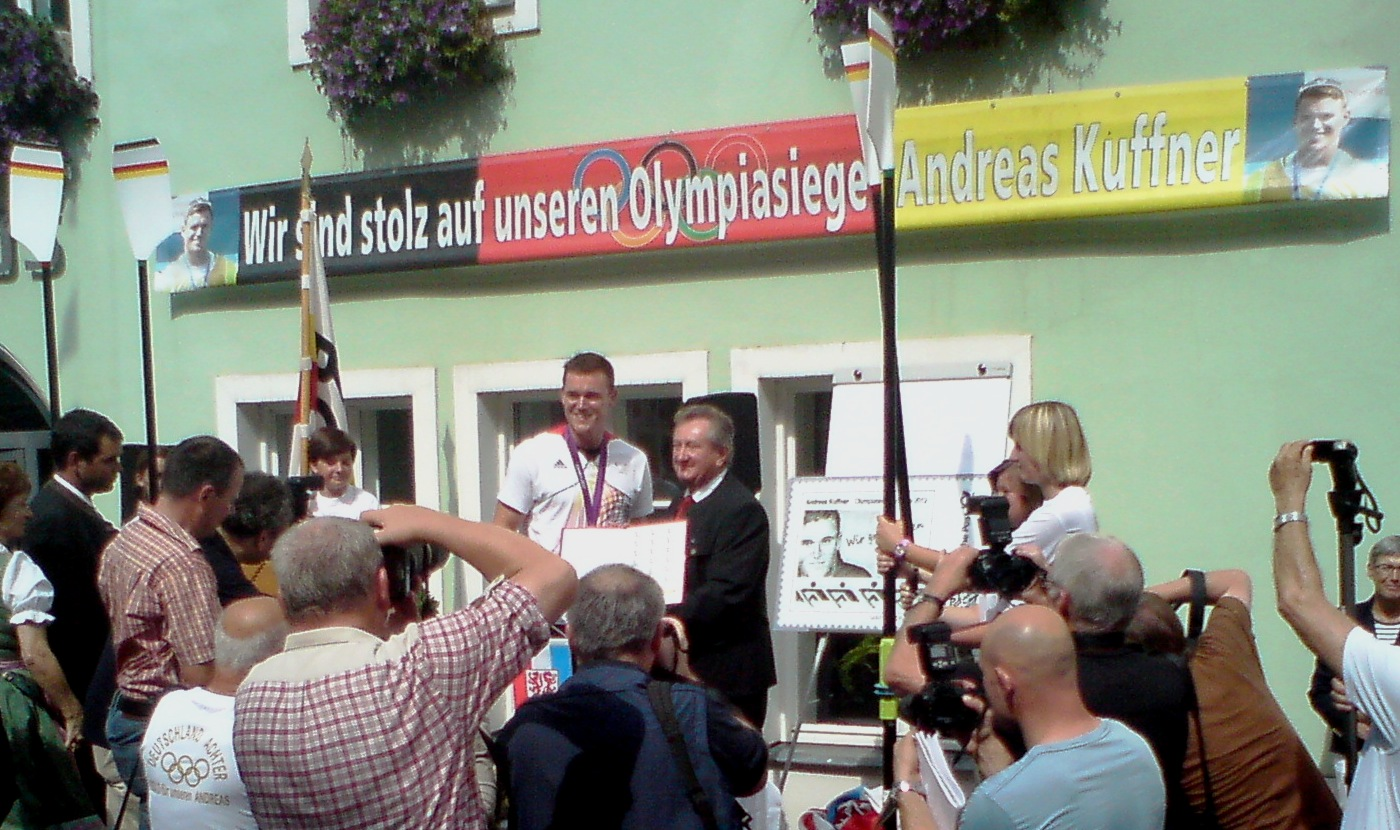

Andreas Kuffner (born 11 March 1987 in Vilshofen) is a German representative rower. He is a dual Olympian, an Olympic gold & silver medallist and a world champion.

He was in the crew that won the gold medal at the men's eight competition at the 2012 Summer Olympics in London. At the 2016 Summer Olympics in Rio de Janeiro, he rowed in Germany's Men's eight which won the silver medal. Those nine 2016 Olympic silver medal rowers were awarded the Silbernes Lorbeerblatt (Silver Laurel Leaf), Germany's highest sports award, for their achievements. It was Kuffner's second such award having been similarly recognised for his 2012 Olympic gold.
