= Matt Gotrel =

British rower

Matthew Gotrel MBE
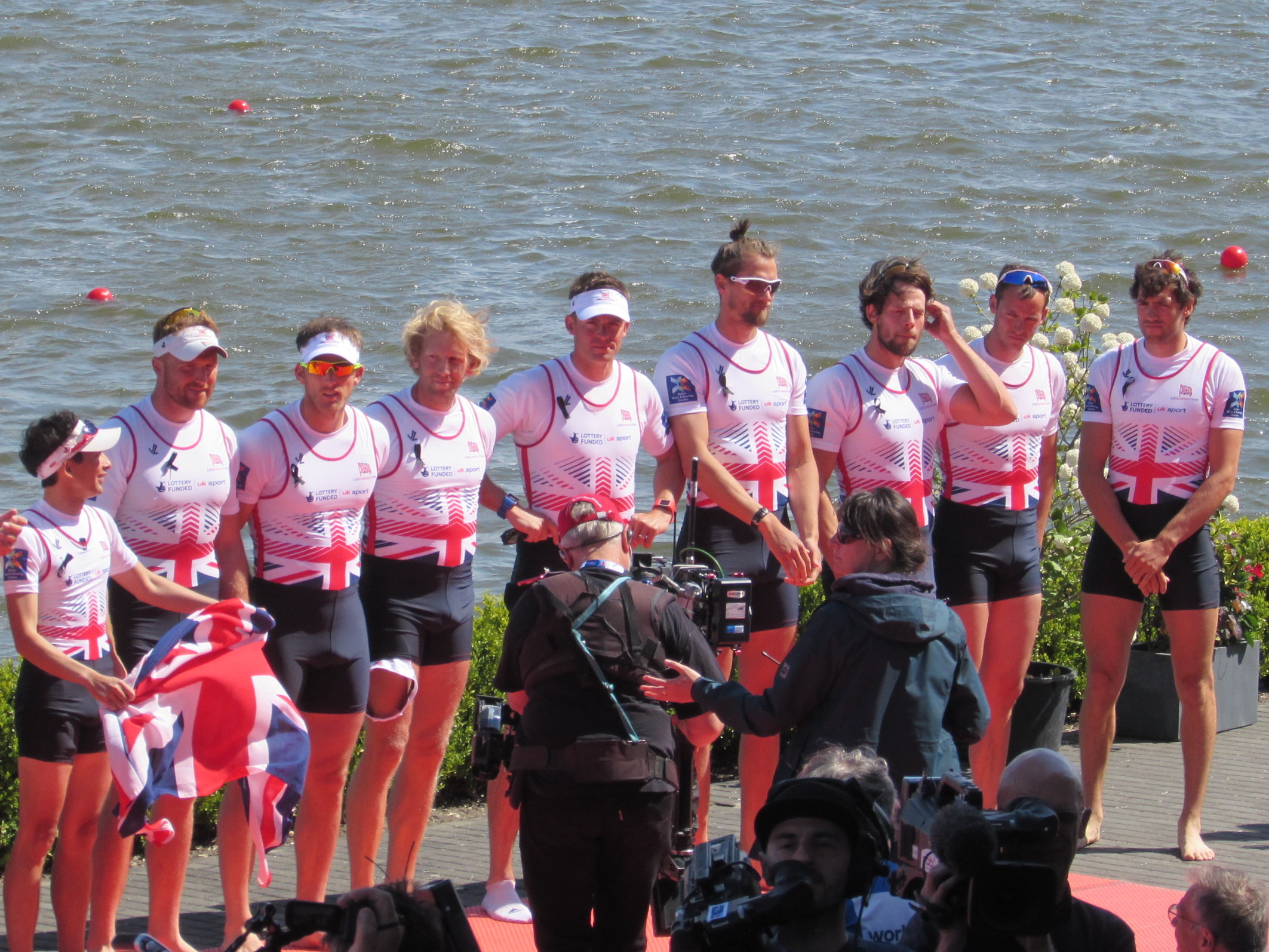
- Gotrel (right) at the European Championships

Personal information
- Born: Matthew Anthony William Gotrel; 1 March 1989 (age 37) Chipping Campden, Gloucestershire, England
- Height: 195 cm (6 ft 5 in)

Sport
- Sport: Rowing
Medal record
Men's rowing
Representing Great Britain
Olympic Games
Gold medal – first place	2016 Rio de Janeiro	M8+
World Championships
Gold medal – first place	2014 Amsterdam	M8+
Gold medal – first place	2015 Aiguebelette	M8+

Matthew Anthony William Gotrel (born 1 March 1989) is a British rower.

== Rowing career ==
At the 2014 World Rowing Championships in Bosbaan, Amsterdam he was a member of the gold medal-winning eight with Nathaniel Reilly-O'Donnell, Matthew Tarrant, Will Satch, Pete Reed, Paul Bennett, Tom Ransley, Constantine Louloudis and Phelan Hill. The following year this was repeated when he was part of the British team that topped the medal table at the 2015 World Rowing Championships at Lac d'Aiguebelette in France, where he won a gold medal as part of the eight with Louloudis, Reed, Bennett, Moe Sbihi, Alex Gregory, George Nash, Satch and Hill.

He won a gold medal in the men's eight event at the 2016 Summer Olympics.

== Awards ==
Gotrel was appointed Member of the Order of the British Empire (MBE) in the 2017 New Year Honours for services to rowing.
