= Phelan Hill =

British rower

Phelan Hill MBE
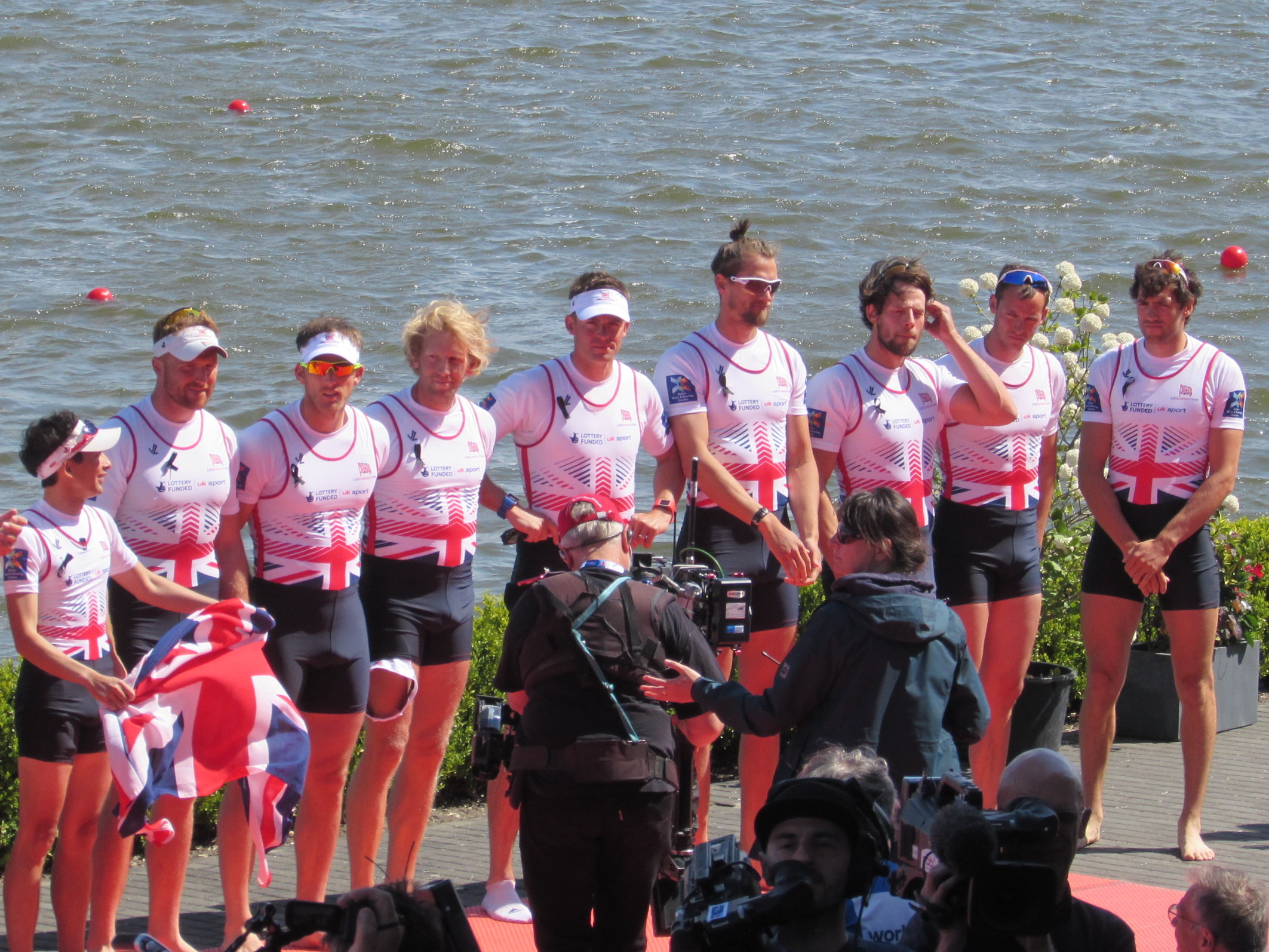

Personal information
- Nationality: British
- Born: 21 July 1982 (age 43) Bedford, Bedfordshire, England

Sport
- Sport: Rowing
- Events: Men's Eight, Men's Coxed Four
- Club: Leander Club and London Rowing Club
Medal record
Olympic Games
Gold medal – first place	2016 Rio de Janeiro	Men's eight
Bronze medal – third place	2012 London	Men's eight
World Championships
Gold medal – first place	2013 Chungju	M8+
Gold medal – first place	2014 Amsterdam	M8+
Gold medal – first place	2015 Aiguebelette	M8+
Silver medal – second place	2010 Karapiro	M8+
Silver medal – second place	2011 Bled	M8+
European Championships
Silver medal – second place	2015 Poznan	Eight
Bronze medal – third place	2014 Belgrade	M8+

Phelan Hill (born 21 July 1982) is a British rowing coxswain. He is a three-time world champion and an Olympic gold medallist. He competed in the Men's eight event at the 2012 Summer Olympics, winning a bronze medal. In 2016, he competed in the Men's eight event at the 2016 Summer Olympics, winning the gold medal.

== Early life and education ==
Hill was brought up in Bedford, and attended Bedford School, where he first learnt to row. He later attended the University of Leicester where he graduated with a degree in Law (LLB) and the College of Law in York.

== Rowing ==
=== 2011 ===
He was part of the British squad that topped the medal table at the 2011 World Rowing Championships in Bled, where he won a silver medal as part of the eight with Nathaniel Reilly-O'Donnell, Cameron Nichol, James Foad, Alex Partridge, Moe Sbihi, Greg Searle, Tom Ransley and Daniel Ritchie.

=== 2013 ===
He competed at the 2013 World Rowing Championships in Chungju, where he won a gold medal as part of the eight with Daniel Ritchie, Tom Ransley, Alex Gregory, Pete Reed, Moe Sbihi, Andrew Triggs Hodge, George Nash and Will Satch.

=== 2014 ===
On 17 March 2014 Hill coxed the composite crew that won the Women's Eights Head of the River Race on the River Thames in London, setting a record time of 17:42.2 for the 4 1/4-mile (6.8 km) Championship Course from Mortlake to Putney. He competed at the 2014 World Rowing Championships in Bosbaan, Amsterdam, where he won a gold medal as part of the eight with Nathaniel Reilly-O'Donnell, Matthew Tarrant, Will Satch, Matt Gotrel, Pete Reed, Paul Bennett, Tom Ransley and Constantine Louloudis.

=== 2015 ===
On 14 March 2015 Hill coxed the composite crew that won the Women's Eights Head of the River Race on the River Thames in London, setting a time of 18:58.6 for the 4 1/4-mile (6.8 km) Championship Course from Mortlake to Putney. He was part of the British team that topped the medal table at the 2015 World Rowing Championships at Lac d'Aiguebelette in France, where he won a gold medal as part of the eight with Matt Gotrel, Constantine Louloudis, Pete Reed, Paul Bennett, Moe Sbihi, Alex Gregory, George Nash and Will Satch.

== Rowing medals ==
=== Olympic Games ===
- 2012 London – Bronze, Men's Eight
- 2016 Rio – Gold, Men's Eight

=== World Championships ===
- 2010 Karapiro – Silver, Men's Eight
- 2011 Bled – Silver, Men's Eight
- 2013 Chungju – Gold, Men's Eight
- 2014 Amsterdam – Gold, Men's Eight
- 2015 Aiguebelette – Gold, Men's Eight

=== World Cups ===
- 2007 Amsterdam – Gold, Eight
- 2009 Banyoles – Bronze, Eight
- 2009 Munich – Bronze, Eight
- 2010 Bled – Gold, Eight
- 2010 Munich – Bronze, Eight
- 2010 Lucerne – Bronze, Eight
- 2011 Munich – Silver, Eight
- 2011 Lucerne – Bronze, Eight
- 2012 Belgrade – Silver, Eight
- 2012 Lucerne – Silver, Eight
- 2012 Munich – Bronze, Eight
