= Paul Bennett (rower) =

British rower (born 1988)

Paul Bennett MBE
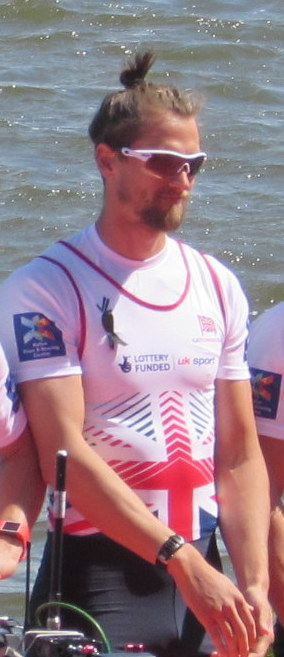
- Bennett at the 2016 European Rowing Championships

Personal information
- Born: 16 December 1988 (age 37) Leeds, England
- Education: King's College London; Kellogg College, Oxford
- Height: 6 ft 9 in (2.06 m)
- Weight: 15 st 10 lb (100 kg)
Medal record
Men's rowing
Representing Great Britain
Olympic Games
Gold medal – first place	2016 Rio de Janeiro	M8+
World Championships
Gold medal – first place	2014 Amsterdam	M8+
Gold medal – first place	2015 Aiguebelette	M8+
European Championships
Silver medal – second place	2015 Poznan	M8+

Paul Bennett (born 16 December 1988) is a British rower and Olympic gold medallist.

== Rowing career ==
Bennett won the Boat Race in 2013 sitting at five for Oxford.

He competed at the 2014 World Rowing Championships in Bosbaan, Amsterdam, where he won a gold medal as part of the eight with Nathaniel Reilly-O'Donnell, Matthew Tarrant, Will Satch, Matt Gotrel, Pete Reed, Tom Ransley, Constantine Louloudis and Phelan Hill. The following year he was part of the British team that topped the medal table at the 2015 World Rowing Championships at Lac d'Aiguebelette in France, where he won a gold medal as part of the eight with Matt Gotrel, Louloudis, Reed, Moe Sbihi, Alex Gregory, George Nash, Satch and Hill.

In 2016 he won a gold medal in the eight at the 2016 Summer Olympics.

== Awards ==
He was appointed Member of the Order of the British Empire (MBE) in the 2017 New Year Honours for services to rowing.

== Education ==
From the age of about twelve until he was eighteen Bennett was educated at Roundhay School. Later he went on to graduate with a first class MSci in mathematics from King's College London in 2012, and completed an MSc in Computer Science at Kellogg College, Oxford in 2013.
