= George Nash (rower) =

British rower (born 1989)

George Nash MBE
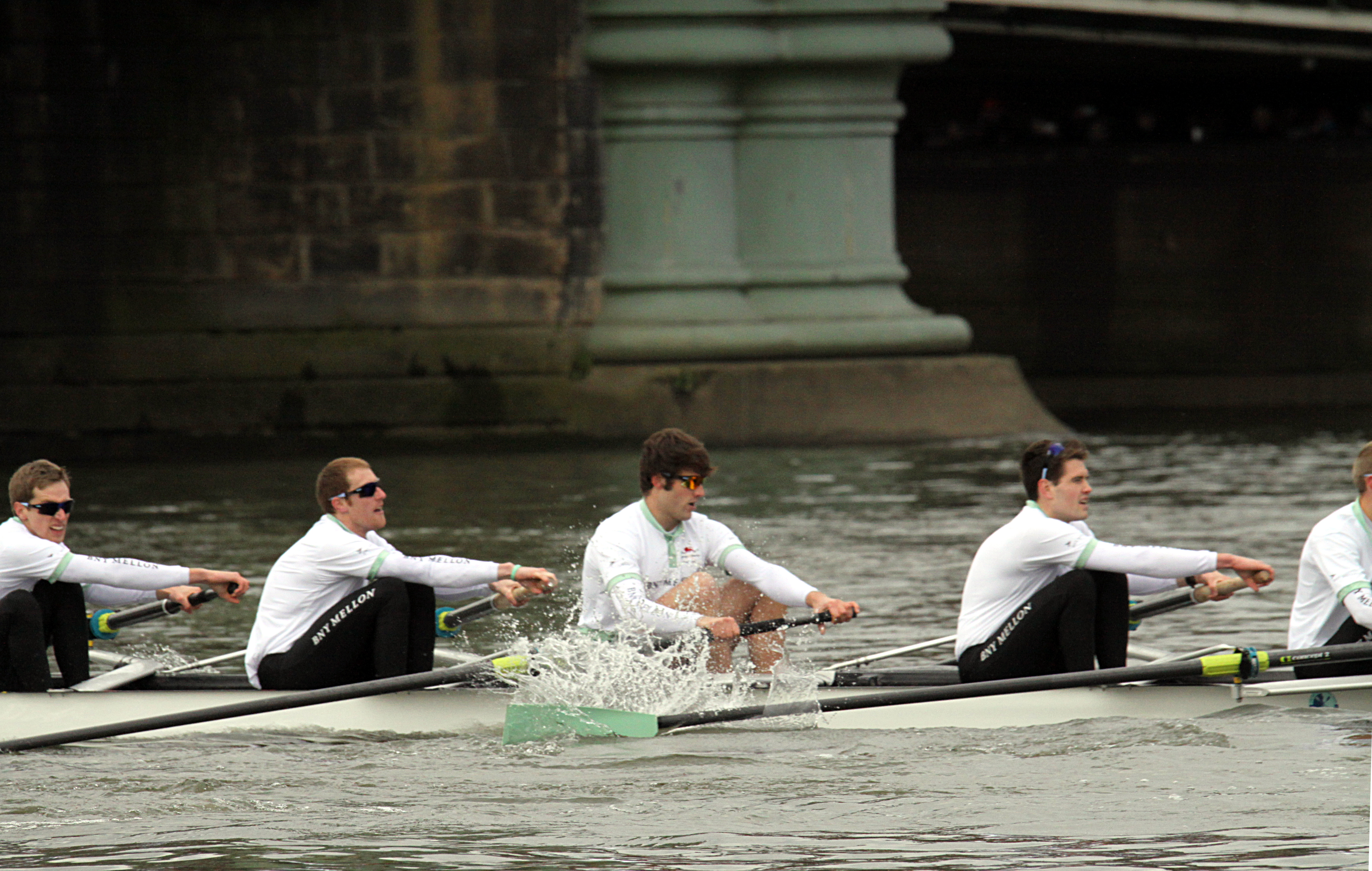
- Nash (second left) in the Cambridge 2013 Boat Race crew

Personal information
- Born: George Christopher Nash; 2 October 1989 (age 36) Guildford, Surrey, England
- Education: University of Cambridge
- Height: 6 ft 5 in (196 cm)
- Weight: 214 lb (97 kg)
Medal record
Men's rowing
Representing Great Britain
Olympic Games
Gold medal – first place	2016 Rio de Janeiro	Coxless four
Bronze medal – third place	2012 London	Men's coxless pair
World Championships
Gold medal – first place	2013 Chungju	Eight
Gold medal – first place	2014 Amsterdam	Coxless four
Gold medal – first place	2015 Aiguebelette	Eight
European Championships
Gold medal – first place	2014 Belgrade	Coxless four
Silver medal – second place	2015 Poznan	Eight
Gold medal – first place	2016 Brandenburg	Coxless four

George Christopher Nash (born 2 October 1989) is a British rower. He is a dual Olympian, dual Olympic medal winner and three time world champion.

== Education ==
Nash attended Lanesborough School in Guildford and Winchester College, where he was Vice-Captain of the Boat Club. He then studied Engineering at St. Catharine's College, Cambridge, where he was a member of the Cambridge University Boat Club.

Nash initially rowed in the Cambridge reserve boat, Goldie, in 2009. He rowed in Cambridge's Blue Boat in the 2010 and 2011 Boat Races, winning in 2010 and losing in 2011. He took the 2011–2012 year off from Cambridge in order to focus on the 2012 Summer Olympics. Upon his return to Cambridge for the 2012–2013 year, Nash was elected as President of the Cambridge University Boat Club. He sat in the 5-seat of the losing crew of the 2013 race. He now rows for Molesey Boat Club.

== International representation ==
Nash first represented Great Britain at the 2006 World Rowing Junior Championships in Amsterdam. Rowing as a member of the Men's Eight, Nash placed fourth. At the 2007 Rowing World Junior Championships in Beijing, he won a gold medal in the coxless four.

In 2009 he progressed to represent Britain at the World Rowing U23 Championships in Racice, placing 9th in the coxed four. In 2010, at the World Rowing U23 Championships in Brest, Nash won a silver medal as a member of the coxless four. In 2011, Nash rowed in a pair with Oxford rower Constantine Louloudis. Louloudis and Nash won gold at the World Rowing U23 Championships that year, and also placed 7th at a Senior Rowing World Cup event in Lucerne.

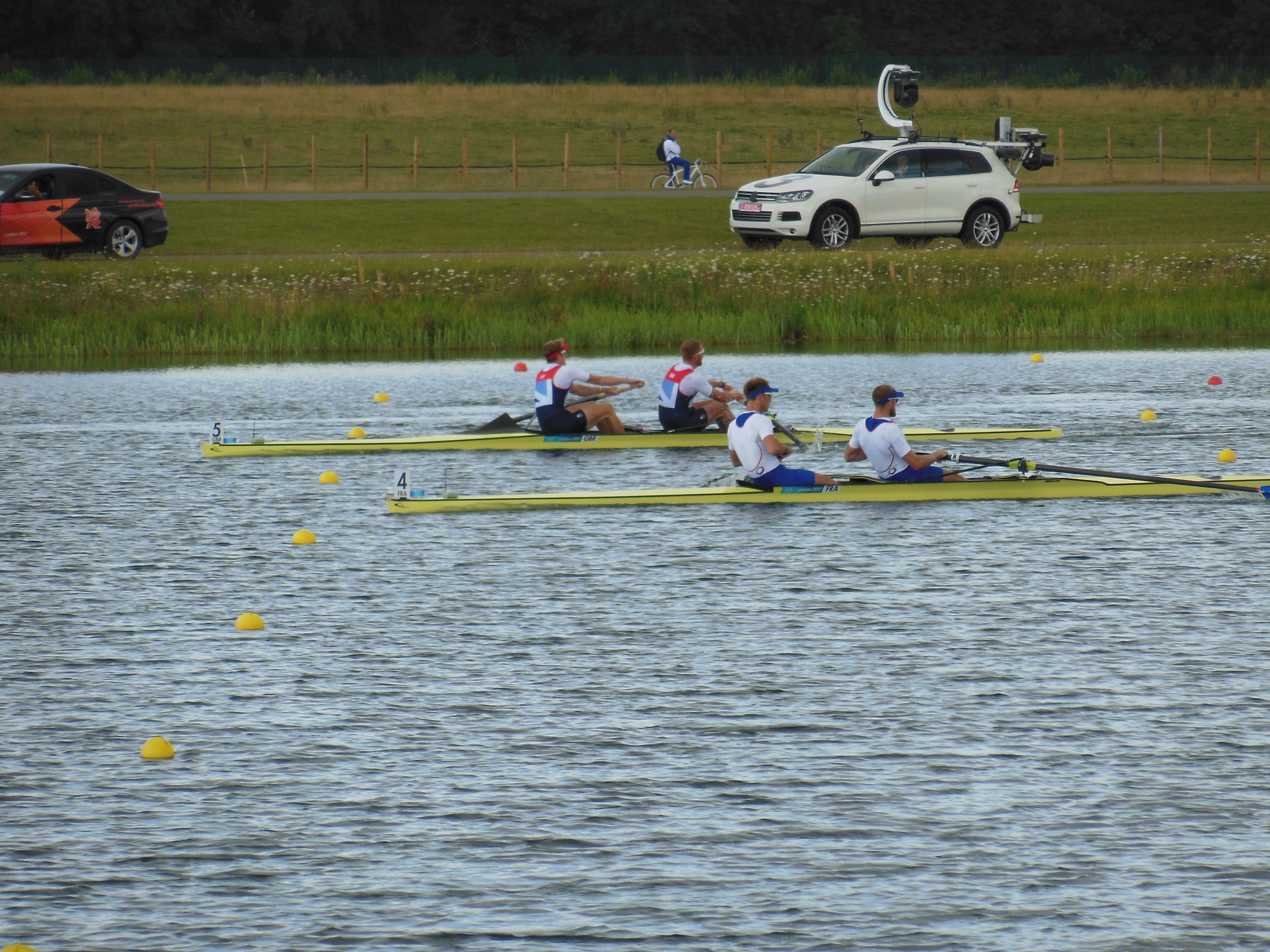
Rowing the final (left boat) of the men's coxless pair at the 2012 Summer Olympics.

Nash won the bronze medal in the coxless pair along with Will Satch of Leander Club at the 2012 Summer Olympics.

In 2013, Nash was a member of the Great Britain Men's Eight that won Britain's first ever world title in the event.

In 2014, Nash was moved into Great Britain's flagship boat, the Men's Coxless four along with Alex Gregory, Andrew Triggs Hodge and Moe Sbihi. The crew won gold medals at the 2014 European Rowing Championships in Belgrade as well as at the Rowing World Cup events in Lac d'Aiguebelette, France and Lucerne, Switzerland. The crew culminated the year with a gold medal at the 2014 World Rowing Championships. In the men's eight, Nash came second at the 2015 European Championships and was part of the British team that topped the medal table at the 2015 World Rowing Championships at Lac d'Aiguebelette in France, where he won a gold medal as part of the eight with Matt Gotrel, Constantine Louloudis, Pete Reed, Paul Bennett, Moe Sbihi, Alex Gregory, Will Satch and Phelan Hill.

With the men's four, himself, Gregory, Sbihi and Louloudis, Nash won the 2016 European Championship and the gold medal at the 2016 Olympics.
