= Pete Reed =

British rower (born 1981)

Lieutenant Commander Pete Reed OBE
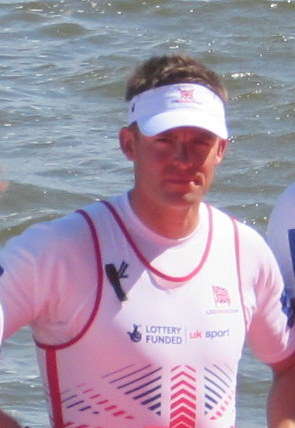

Personal information
- Full name: Peter K. Reed
- Nationality: British
- Born: 27 July 1981 (age 44) Seattle, Washington, U.S.
- Height: 6 ft 6 in (198 cm)

Sport
- Sport: Rowing
- College team: Oxford University Boat Club
- Club: Leander Club
- Coached by: Jürgen Gröbler
Medal record
Men's rowing
Representing Great Britain
Olympic Games
Gold medal – first place	2008 Beijing	Coxless four
Gold medal – first place	2012 London	Coxless four
Gold medal – first place	2016 Rio de Janeiro	Eight
World Championships
Gold medal – first place	2005 Gifu	Coxless four
Gold medal – first place	2006 Eton Dorney	Coxless four
Gold medal – first place	2013 Chungju	Eight
Gold medal – first place	2014 Amsterdam	Eight
Gold medal – first place	2015 Aiguebelette	Eight
Silver medal – second place	2009 Poznań	Coxless pair
Silver medal – second place	2010 Karapiro	Coxless pair
Silver medal – second place	2011 Bled	Coxless pair
European Championships
Silver medal – second place	2015 Poznan	Eight
Bronze medal – third place	2014 Belgrade	Eight

Peter K. Reed (born 27 July 1981) is a retired British Olympic rower. Reed is a three-times Olympic gold medallist – earning gold in the Men's coxless four at the 2008 and 2012 Olympics, and then a gold medal in the Men's eight at the 2016 Olympics in Rio de Janeiro. He has also won five gold medals and three silver medals at the World Championships.

== Background and military career ==
Reed was born in Seattle, Washington, US but his family moved to England several months later. He was brought up in Nailsworth, Gloucestershire and attended Cirencester Deer Park School, and later Cirencester College for his A-levels.

Reed joined the Royal Navy in 1999 and began rowing relatively late. In 2001, whilst training as an officer on board HMS Exeter, he used an ergometer for the first time – and promptly posted the fastest time in the Royal Navy's annual fleet-wide fitness competition. He received a medical discharge in 2022 and left with the rank of lieutenant commander.

== Rowing career ==
Reed took up rowing in his second year of university in 2002, whilst studying mechanical engineering at the University of the West of England, to become a naval engineer. The following year, in 2003, coached by Fred Smallbone, he became a successful Boat Club President.

In 2004, Reed won a place at the University of Oxford to attend a two-year MSc course in engineering, based at Oriel College. During this time, he trained at the Oxford University Boat Club (OUBC) under coach Sean Bowden, where he earned the nickname "The Commander". He was selected in both years for the Blue Boat to race against Cambridge in the annual Boat Race. Defeat in 2004 was followed by victory in 2005. The race gained much publicity as Oxford narrowly won by 2 lengths in a time of 16 minutes 42 seconds with its "heaviest-ever Boat Race crew", a record which was later broken in 2009.

In 2005, Reed and his Oxford strokeman, Andrew Triggs Hodge, won GB senior pairs trials (together they won every year from 2005 to 2012), and following the retirement of Matthew Pinsent and James Cracknell were selected by coach Jürgen Gröbler to row alongside Alex Partridge and Steve Williams MBE, in the new Great Britain Coxless Four.

Unbeaten for 27 consecutive races until Lucerne 2007, the British Four won gold at all three World Cups in 2005 and 2006, and finished both seasons by becoming World Champions.

Reed continued his training to represent Great Britain at the 2008 Summer Olympics in Beijing. After a difficult early season, in which his teammates Tom James, whom he had rowed against in the 2005 Boat Race, and Andrew Triggs Hodge picked up injuries, the first-choice four raced together for the first time in Poznań in the final World Cup event of the season, finishing second. The GB four then dominated their heats and semi finals at the Beijing Olympics. In the final, however, the Australian four lead for most of the way. Only a dramatic push by the British boat in the closing stages made the difference; they won the nail biting final to become gold medallists in a time of 6 minutes 6.57 seconds, beating the Australian four by 1.28 seconds.

He stands 6 feet 6 inches tall and was reported in 2006 as having the largest recorded lung capacity (11.68 litres). Originally due to return to full-time naval duties after returning from Beijing he confirmed on 6 November 2008 that he had been given permission to continue training for the 2012 Summer Olympics in London. At the 2012 Summer Games, Reed, along with Triggs-Hodge, James and Alex Gregory, helped Great Britain retain the gold medal in the men's coxless four.

He competed at the 2013 World Rowing Championships in Chungju, where he won a gold medal as part of the eight. He then competed at the 2014 World Rowing Championships in Bosbaan, Amsterdam, where he won a gold medal as part of the eight and the following year he was part of the British team that topped the medal table at the 2015 World Rowing Championships at Lac d'Aiguebelette in France, where he won a gold medal as part of the eight with Matt Gotrel, Constantine Louloudis, Paul Bennett, Moe Sbihi, Alex Gregory, George Nash, Will Satch and Phelan Hill.

In April 2018, Reed announced his retirement from professional rowing.

== Personal life ==
In August 2014, Reed was one of 200 public figures who were signatories to a letter to The Guardian opposing Scottish independence in the run-up to September's referendum on that issue.

In October 2019, Reed announced via Instagram that he had suffered a spinal stroke, which has left him paralysed from the chest down.

Reed and his wife have a son (born in 2023).

== Honours ==
Reed was appointed Member of the Order of the British Empire (MBE) in the 2009 New Year Honours and Officer of the Order of the British Empire (OBE) in the 2017 New Year Honours for services to rowing.

== Rowing palmares ==
=== Olympics ===
- 2016 Rio de Janeiro – Gold, eight (5 seat)
- 2012 London – Gold, coxless four (2 seat)
- 2008 Beijing – Gold, coxless four (3 seat)

=== World Championships ===
- 2015 Aiguebelette – Gold, men's eight (3 seat)
- 2014 Amsterdam – Gold, men's eight (5 seat)
- 2013 Chungju – Gold, men's eight (4 seat)
- 2011 Bled – Silver, coxless pair (Bow)
- 2010 Karapiro – Silver, coxless pair (Bow)
- 2009 Poznań – Silver, coxless pair (Bow)
- 2007 Munich – 4th, coxless Four (2 seat)
- 2006 Eton – Gold, coxless four (2 seat)
- 2005 Gifu – Gold, coxless four (2 seat)

=== World Cups ===
- 2014 Lucerne – Bronze, men's 8 (5 seat)
- 2014 Aiguebelette – Silver, men's 8 (5 seat)
- 2013 Eton Dorney – Gold, men's 8 (7 seat)
- 2013 Sydney – Gold, men's 8 (7 seat)
- 2012 Munich – Silver, coxless four (2 seat)
- 2012 Lucerne – Gold, coxless four (2 seat)
- 2012 Belgrade – Gold, coxless four (2 seat)
- 2011 Lucerne – Silver, coxless pair (bow)
- 2011 Munich – Gold, coxless pair (bow)
- 2010 Lucerne – Silver, coxless pair (bow)
- 2010 Munich – Silver, coxless pair (bow)
- 2010 Bled – Gold, eight (7 seat)
- 2010 Bled – Silver, coxless pair (bow)
- 2009 Lucerne – Silver, coxless pair (bow)
- 2009 Munich – Silver, coxless pair (bow)
- 2009 Banyoles – Gold, coxless pair (bow)
- 2008 Poznań – Silver, coxless four (3 seat)
- 2008 Lucerne – 8th, coxless four (3 seat)
- 2008 Munich – Gold, coxless four (3 seat)
- 2007 Lucerne – Silver, coxless four (2 seat)
- 2007 Amsterdam – Gold, men's eight
- 2007 Linz – Gold, coxless four (2 seat)
- 2006 Lucerne – Gold, coxless four (3 seat)
- 2006 Poznań – Gold, coxless four (3 seat)
- 2006 Munich – Gold, coxless four (2 seat)
- 2005 Lucerne – Gold, coxless four (2 seat)
- 2005 Munich – Gold, coxless four (2 seat)
- 2005 Eton – Gold, coxless four (2 seat)
- 2004 Poznań – 11th, coxless pair (bow)

=== World Rowing Under 23 Championships ===
- 2003 – 4th, coxed four

== Other ==
- British Olympic Association Male Olympic Athlete 2014
- Senior Pairs Trials winner 2012
- Senior Pairs Trials winner 2011
- Senior Pairs Trials winner 2010
- Senior Pairs Trials winner 2009
- Combined Services Sportsman of the Year 2008
- President's Award from the Sports Journalists' Association
- Senior Pairs Trials winner 2008
- Senior Pairs Trials winner 2007
- Senior Pairs Trials winner 2006
- Senior Pairs Trials winner 2005
- Combined Services Sportsman of the Year 2005
- Royal Navy Sportsman of the Year 2005

== See also ==
- 2012 Olympics gold post boxes in the United Kingdom
