= Alex Gregory =

British rower (born 1984)

Alex Gregory MBE
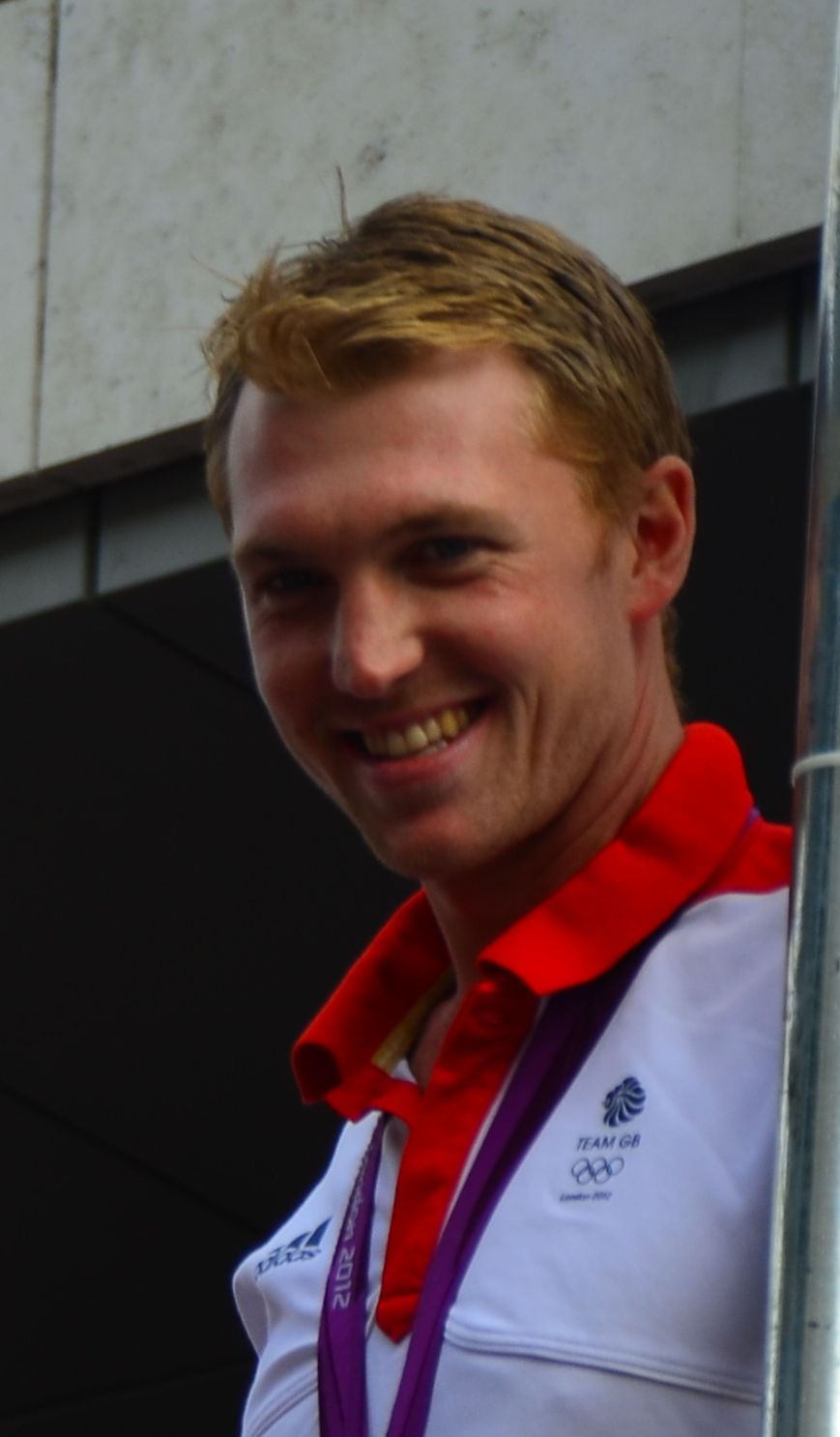

Personal information
- Full name: Alexander John Gregory
- Nationality: British
- Born: 11 March 1984 (age 42) Cheltenham, England
- Height: 1.98 m (6 ft 6 in)
- Weight: 97 kg (214 lb)
Medal record
Men's rowing
Representing Great Britain
Olympic Games
Gold medal – first place	2012 London	Coxless four
Gold medal – first place	2016 Rio de Janeiro	Coxless four
World Championships
Gold medal – first place	2009 Poznań	Coxless four
Gold medal – first place	2011 Bled	Coxless four
Gold medal – first place	2013 Chungju	Eight
Gold medal – first place	2014 Amsterdam	Coxless four
Gold medal – first place	2015 Aiguebelette	Eight
European Championships
Gold medal – first place	2014 Belgrade	Coxless four
Silver medal – second place	2015 Poznan	Eight
Gold medal – first place	2016 Brandenburg	Coxless four

Alexander John Gregory, MBE (born 11 March 1984) is an English former representative rower. He is a six-time world champion and a two-time Olympic gold medallist at 2012 and 2016 in the Coxless four.

== Education ==
Alex Gregory was educated at the Richard Pate School in Cheltenham, then Bredon Hill Middle School, a comprehensive school in Ashton under Hill, Worcestershire, followed by Prince Henry's High School in Evesham. He later attended the University of Reading in Berkshire, from which he graduated in 2006.

== Career ==
Born in Cheltenham, Gregory gained his first GB vest in 2004 at the World Rowing U23 Championships in Poland, finishing 11th in the quad. At the World U23 Championships in 2005 he was 4th in the double and 8th in the single the following year. He has been a full member of the men's squad since his graduation from university. Gregory is also a member of the Leander Club, of which he was Captain.

He was selected for the 2008 Beijing Olympic Games as a reserve, having narrowly missed out on qualifying the men's quad for the Games.

Gregory won the pair at the GB Rowing Senior Trials in his first season in 'sweep'. He established his place in the new GB four during the 2009 World Cup Series winning two golds and a bronze to take the overall 2009 title. He was the 'rookie' in the boat, racing with three experienced Olympians, all medallists from Beijing.

At the 2009 World Rowing Championships the four's main rivals were the Australian silver medal four from Beijing who had stayed together to avenge the GB victory at the Olympics. GB won the gold medal, almost two seconds ahead of Australia with Slovenia in third.

At the 2011 World Rowing Championships in Bled, Slovenia, Gregory raced in the men's four with crewmates Matt Langridge, Richard Egington and Tom James, winning a gold medal ahead of Greece in second and Australia in third.

At the 2012 GB Rowing Team Senior Trials held in March at Eton Dorney, Gregory and crew mate Alex Partridge came second in the men's pair.

Pete Reed, Tom James and Andrew Triggs Hodge, who won gold in the four in Beijing, were all selected along with Gregory for the Olympic season. The four went on to win the 2012 London Olympic Games gold medal in the Coxless four at Eton Dorney.

He competed at the 2013 World Rowing Championships in Chungju, where he won a gold medal as part of the eight and the following year he competed at the 2014 World Rowing Championships in Bosbaan, Amsterdam, where he won a gold medal as part of the coxless four with Moe Sbihi, George Nash and Andrew Triggs Hodge. One year later he was part of the British team that topped the medal table at the 2015 World Rowing Championships at Lac d'Aiguebelette in France, where he won a gold medal as part of the eight with Matt Gotrel, Constantine Louloudis, Pete Reed, Paul Bennett, Moe Sbihi, George Nash, Will Satch and Phelan Hill.

== Honours ==
In August 2012, to celebrate his gold medal at London 2012, post boxes were painted gold in his home town of Cheltenham.

Gregory was appointed Member of the Order of the British Empire (MBE) in the 2013 New Year Honours for services to rowing.

On 20 November 2015, Gregory was named as "Olympic Athlete of the Year" at the GB Rowing Teams awards.

== See also ==
- 2012 Summer Olympics and Paralympics gold post boxes
- Great Britain at the 2012 Summer Olympics
