= 2015 World Rowing Championships =

International rowing event

- Venue: Lac d'Aiguebelette
- Location: Aiguebelette-le-Lac, France
- Dates: 30 August to 6 September
- Competitors: 1300 from 77 nations

The 2015 World Rowing Championships were World Rowing Championships that were held from 30 August to 6 September 2015 at the Lac d'Aiguebelette, Aiguebelette-le-Lac in France.

== Description ==
The annual week-long rowing regatta was organized by FISA (the International Rowing Federation). In non-Olympic years the regatta is the highlight of the international rowing calendar; as 2015 was a pre-Olympic year, the championships were also the main qualification event for the following year's Olympics and Paralympics.

For the first time, Rowing New Zealand started in all (14) Olympic boat classes.

== Medal summary ==
=== Medal table ===
Combined standings
Rank	Nation	Gold	Silver	Bronze	Total
1	Great Britain	5	9	1	15
2	New Zealand	5	3	1	9
3	Germany	3	4	2	9
4	Australia	3	2	0	5
5	United States	3	1	3	7
6	France	2	2	2	6
7	Czech Republic	1	1	0	2
8	Croatia	1	0	0	1
8	Israel	1	0	0	1
8	Italy	1	0	0	1
8	Switzerland	1	0	0	1
12	Denmark	0	1	1	2
12	Lithuania	0	1	1	2
14	Greece	0	1	0	1
14	Slovenia	0	1	0	1
16	Netherlands	0	0	3	3
16	Serbia	0	0	3	3
18	Canada	0	0	2	2
18	China	0	0	2	2
18	Norway	0	0	2	2
21	Estonia	0	0	1	1
21	South Africa	0	0	1	1
21	Ukraine	0	0	1	1
Totals (23 entries)		26	26	26	78

=== Men's events ===
Non-Olympic classes

Event	Gold		Silver		Bronze	
M1x	Czech Republic; Ondřej Synek	6:54.76	New Zealand; Mahé Drysdale	6:55.10	Lithuania; Mindaugas Griškonis	6:57.64
M2x	Croatia; Martin Sinković; Valent Sinković	6:03.33	Lithuania; Rolandas Maščinskas; Saulius Ritter	6:05.31	New Zealand; Robbie Manson; Christopher Harris	6:06.73
M4x	Germany; Philipp Wende; Karl Schulze; Lauritz Schoof; Hans Gruhne	5:53.22	Australia; David Crawshay; Karsten Forsterling; Cameron Girdlestone; David Watts	5:54.75	Estonia; Andrei Jämsä; Allar Raja; Tõnu Endrekson; Kaspar Taimsoo	5:56.34
M2−	New Zealand; Eric Murray; Hamish Bond	6:15.83	Great Britain; James Foad; Matt Langridge	6:22.35	Serbia; Miloš Vasić; Nenad Beđik	6:25.36
M4−	Italy; Marco Di Costanzo; Matteo Castaldo; Matteo Lodo; Giuseppe Vicino	5:46.78	Australia; Will Lockwood; Spencer Turrin; Josh Dunkley-Smith; Alexander Hill	5:48.74	Great Britain; Scott Durant; Alan Sinclair; Tom Ransley; Stewart Innes	5:49.00
M2+	Great Britain; Nathaniel Reilly-O'Donnell; Matthew Tarrant; Henry Fieldman	6:51.31	Germany; Jakob Schneider; Clemens Ernsting; Jonas Wiesen	6:57.36	Serbia; Viktor Pivač; Martin Mačković; Luka Mladenović	6:59.53
M8+	Great Britain; Matt Gotrel; Constantine Louloudis; Pete Reed; Paul Bennett; Moe Sbihi; Alex Gregory; George Nash; Will Satch; Phelan Hill	5:36.18	Germany; Maximilian Munski; Malte Jakschik; Maximilian Reinelt; Eric Johannesen; Anton Braun; Felix Drahotta; Richard Schmidt; Hannes Ocik; Martin Sauer	5:36.36	Netherlands; Dirk Uittenbogaard; Boaz Meylink; Kaj Hendriks; Boudewijn Röell; Olivier Siegelaar; Tone Wieten; Mechiel Versluis; Robert Lücken; Peter Wiersum	5:38.09
Men's lightweight events
LM1x	New Zealand; Adam Ling	6:53.80	Slovenia; Rajko Hrvat	6:54.59	Serbia; Miloš Stanojević	6:55.88
LM2x	France; Stany Delayre; Jérémie Azou	6:13.38	Great Britain; Will Fletcher; Richard Chambers	6:15.15	Norway; Kristoffer Brun; Are Strandli	6:15.52
LM4x	France; Maxime Demontfaucon; Damien Piqueras; Pierre Houin; Morgan Maunoir	5:48.50	Germany; Roman Acht; Daniel Lawitzke; Philipp Grebner; Jonathan Rommelmann	5:48.81	Denmark; Emil Espensen; Andrej Bendtsen; Mathias Larsen; Oscar Petersen	5:50.41
LM2−	Great Britain; Joel Cassells; Sam Scrimgeour	6:29.40	France; Augustin Mouterde; Théophile Onfroy	6:32.02	Germany; Jonas Kilthau; Matthias Arnold	6:34.53
LM4−	Switzerland; Lucas Tramèr; Simon Schürch; Simon Niepmann; Mario Gyr	5:55.31	Denmark; Kasper Winther Jørgensen; Jens Vilhelmsen; Jacob Barsøe; Jacob Larsen	5:57.58	France; Franck Solforosi; Thomas Baroukh; Thibault Colard; Guillaume Raineau	5:58.22
LM8+	Germany; Tobias Schad; Simon Barr; Torben Neumann; Florian Roller; Tobias Franzmann; Stefan Wallat; Claas Mertens; Can Temel; Felix Heinemann	5:38.92	France; Gaël Chocheyras; Alexis Guérinot; Clément Duret; Thibault Lecomte; Clément Fonta; Vincent Cavard; Clément Roulet-Dubonnet; Fabrice Moreau; Thibaut Hacot	5:40.14	United States; Tobin McGee; John Devlin; Christopher Lambert; Peter Schmidt; Phillip Henson; Alex Twist; David Smith; Matthew Lenhart; Jack Carlson	5:40.41

=== Women's events ===
Non-Olympic classes

Event	Gold		Silver		Bronze	
W1x	Australia; Kim Crow	7:38.92	Czech Republic; Miroslava Knapková	7:41.88	China; Duan Jingli	7:43.21
W2x	New Zealand; Eve Macfarlane; Zoe Stevenson	6:45.09	Greece; Aikaterini Nikolaidou; Sofia Asoumanaki	6:46.51	Germany; Julia Lier; Mareike Adams	6:47.19
W4x	United States; Amanda Elmore; Tracy Eisser; Megan Kalmoe; Olivia Coffey	6:27.07	Germany; Annekatrin Thiele; Carina Bär; Marie-Cathérine Arnold; Lisa Schmidla	6:28.41	Netherlands; Nicole Beukers; Chantal Achterberg; Inge Janssen; Carline Bouw	6:29.69
W2−	Great Britain; Helen Glover; Heather Stanning	6:52.99	New Zealand; Grace Prendergast; Kerri Gowler	6:56.75	United States; Felice Mueller; Elle Logan	7:00.55
W4−	United States; Kristine O'Brien; Grace Latz; Adrienne Martelli; Grace Luczak	6:25.22	Great Britain; Rebecca Chin; Karen Bennett; Lucinda Gooderham; Holly Norton	6:31.52	China; Yin Dameng; Cheng Wenjing; Yi Liqin; Yu Jing	6:35.56
W8+	United States; Victoria Opitz; Meghan Musnicki; Amanda Polk; Lauren Schmetterling; Emily Regan; Kerry Simmonds; Tessa Gobbo; Heidi Robbins; Katelin Snyder	6:05.65	New Zealand; Kayla Pratt; Emma Dyke; Ruby Tew; Kelsey Bevan; Grace Prendergast; Kerri Gowler; Genevieve Behrent; Rebecca Scown; Francie Turner	6:08.52	Canada; Lisa Roman; Cristy Nurse; Jennifer Martins; Ashley Brzozowicz; Christine Roper; Susanne Grainger; Natalie Mastracci; Lauren Wilkinson; Lesley Thompson	6:09.05
Women's lightweight events
LW1x	New Zealand; Zoe McBride	7:32.45	Great Britain; Imogen Walsh	7:33.99	United States; Kathleen Bertko	7:34.58
LW2x	New Zealand; Sophie MacKenzie; Julia Edward	6:53.01	Great Britain; Katherine Copeland; Charlotte Taylor	6:54.22	South Africa; Ursula Grobler; Kirsten McCann	6:55.79
LW4x	Germany; Katrin Thoma; Leonie Pieper; Lena Müller; Anja Noske	6:25.10	Great Britain; Brianna Stubbs; Ruth Walczak; Emily Craig; Eleanor Piggott	6:27.07	Netherlands; Anne Marie Schonk; Mirte Kraaijkamp; Elisabeth Woerner; Marie-Anne Frenken	6:28.27

=== Pararowing (adaptive) events ===
Event	Gold		Silver		Bronze	
ASM1x	Australia; Erik Horrie	4:45.55	Great Britain; Tom Aggar	4:51.09	Ukraine; Igor Bondar	4:51.70
ASW1x	Israel; Moran Samuel	5:25.92	Great Britain; Rachel Morris	5:27.02	Norway; Birgit Skarstein	5:31.94
TAMix2x	Australia; Gavin Bellis; Kathryn Ross	4:03.51	Great Britain; Laurence Whiteley; Lauren Rowles	4:04.03	France; Perle Bouge; Stephane Tardieu	4:06.08
LTAMix4+	Great Britain; Grace Clough; Daniel Brown; Pam Relph; James Fox; Oliver James	3:19.56	United States; Jaclyn Smith; Danielle Hansen; Zachary Burns; Richard Vandegrift; Jennifer Sichel	3:19.82	Canada; Victoria Nolan; Veronique Boucher; Curtis Halladay; Andrew Todd; Kristen Kit	3:27.38

=== Event codes ===
	Single sculls	Double sculls	Quadruple sculls	Coxless pair	Coxless four	Coxed pair	Coxed four	Eight
Men's	M1x	M2x	M4x	M2−	M4−	M2+		M8+
Lightweight men's	LM1x	LM2x	LM4x	LM2−	LM4−			LM8+
Women's	W1x	W2x	W4x	W2−	W4−			W8+
Lightweight women's	LW1x	LW2x	LW4x					
AS men's	ASM1x							
AS women's	ASW1x							
TA mixed		TAMix2x						
LTA mixed							LTAMix4+	

Adaptive rowing classification — AS: arms & shoulders, TA: trunk & arms, LTA: legs, trunk, arms
