= Constantine Louloudis =

British rower (born 1991)

Constantine Louloudis MBE
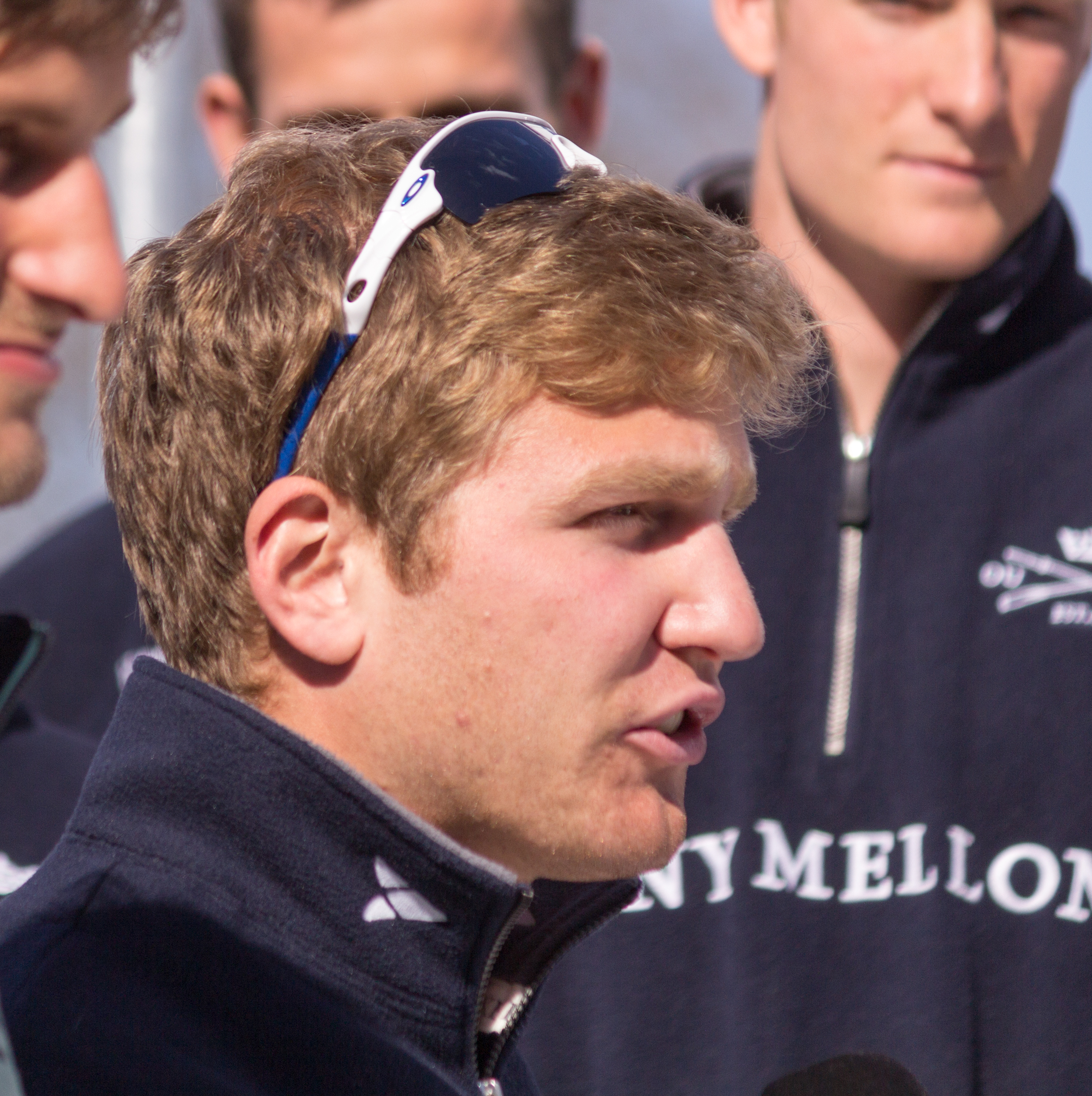
- Louloudis at The Boat Races 2015

Personal information
- Born: 15 September 1991 (age 34) London, England
- Height: 190 cm (6 ft 3 in)
- Weight: 94 kg (207 lb)

Sport
- Country: Great Britain
- Sport: Rowing
- College team: Trinity College Boat Club
- Club: Oxford University Boat Club
Medal record
Men's rowing
Representing Great Britain
Olympic Games
Gold medal – first place	2016 Rio de Janeiro	Coxless four
Bronze medal – third place	2012 London	Eight
World Championships
Gold medal – first place	2014 Amsterdam	M8+
Gold medal – first place	2015 Aiguebelette	M8+
The Boat Race
Gold medal – first place	The Boat Race 2011	Oxford
Gold medal – first place	The Boat Race 2013	Oxford
Gold medal – first place	The Boat Race 2014	Oxford
Gold medal – first place	The Boat Race 2015	Oxford
World Rowing U23 Championships
Gold medal – first place	2011 Amsterdam	BM2-

Constantine Michael Louloudis (born 15 September 1991) is a Greek-British rower. He is an Olympic medal winner, two-time world champion and four-time Boat Race winner.

== Personal life ==
Constantine was a King's Scholar at Eton College, an all-boys public school in Eton, Berkshire. He studied Classics at Trinity College, Oxford, and graduated with a first class Bachelor of Arts (BA) degree.

His father is Greek and comes from the island of Andros. His mother is the Honourable Madeleine Louloudis CVO, a Lady-in-Waiting to Anne, Princess Royal, and daughter of the 20th Viscount Dillon. He has one sister, Theodora, an award-winning journalist.

== Rowing career ==
Constantine learned to row at Eton and in 2009 he stroked the Eton VIII that won at Henley Royal Regatta, the National Schools' Regatta and the Schools' Head.

He was in the six seat of the winning Oxford Blue boat at the 2011 Oxford-Cambridge Boat Race. Later in 2011, he won the Men's Pairs, with George Nash, at the FISA World Rowing Under 23 Championships on the Bosbaan on 24 July 2011 in Amsterdam, Netherlands.

He took a year out of his studies to train for and compete at the 2012 Summer Olympics, winning a bronze medal in the men's eight. Louloudis then returned to his Oxford studies, rowing in the winning eights of a second and third Boat Race in 2013 and 2014, before returning to the British eight, which he stroked to a gold medal at the 2014 World Rowing Championships. The next year he won a final Boat Race as president of Oxford University Boat Club. He was part of the British team that topped the medal table at the 2015 World Rowing Championships at Lac d'Aiguebelette in France, where he won a gold medal as part of the eight with Matt Gotrel, Pete Reed, Paul Bennett, Moe Sbihi, Alex Gregory, George Nash, Will Satch and Phelan Hill.

At the 2016 Olympic games in Rio de Janeiro, Louloudis rounded off his medal collection by stroking the GB men's 4- to gold, the fifth consecutive time a British crew had won the event.

== Post rowing ==
Louloudis was part of the BBC's coverage of the Boat Race from 2016 until 2022.

== Honours ==
Louloudis was appointed an MBE in the Queen's 2017 New Year Honours list for services to rowing.
