= Andrew Triggs Hodge =

British rower (born 1979)

Andrew Triggs Hodge OBE
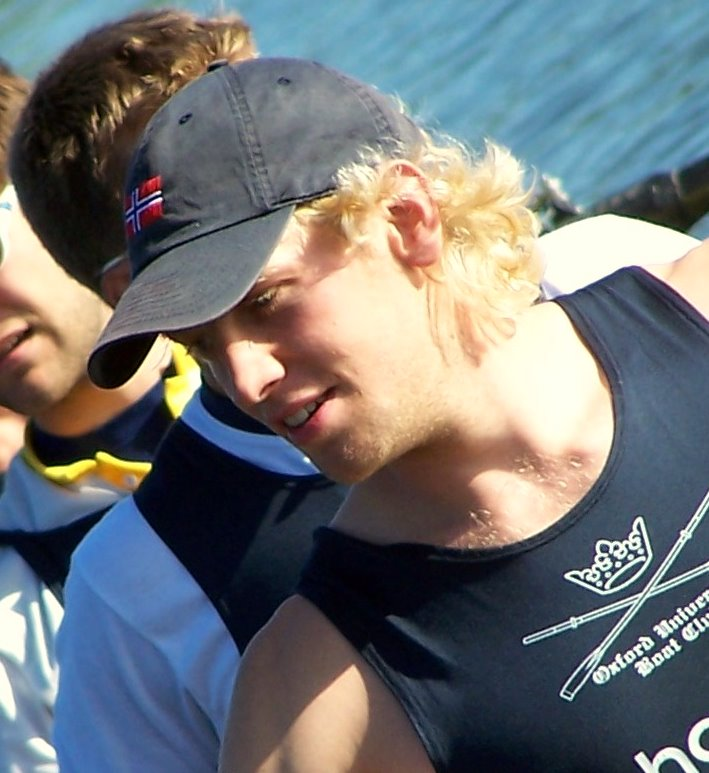

Personal information
- Born: 3 March 1979 (age 47) Halton, Buckinghamshire, England
- Height: 192 cm (6 ft 4 in)

Sport
- Country: Great Britain
- Sport: Men's rowing
- University team: Oxford University Boat Club
- Club: Molesey Boat Club
Medal record
Representing Great Britain
Olympic Games
Gold medal – first place	2008 Beijing	Coxless four
Gold medal – first place	2012 London	Coxless four
Gold medal – first place	2016 Rio de Janeiro	Eight
World Championships
Gold medal – first place	2005 Gifu	Coxless four
Gold medal – first place	2006 Eton	Coxless four
Gold medal – first place	2013 Chungju	Eight
Gold medal – first place	2014 Amsterdam	Coxless four
Silver medal – second place	2009 Poznań	Coxless pair
Silver medal – second place	2010 Karapiro	Coxless pair
Silver medal – second place	2011 Bled	Coxless pair
Bronze medal – third place	2003 Milan	Eight
European championships
Gold medal – first place	2014 Belgrade	Coxless four

Andrew Triggs Hodge OBE (born 3 March 1979) is a British former rower - a three time Olympic champion and four time world champion. In the British coxless four in 2012 he set a world's best time which still stood as of 2023.

== Education ==
Born in Halton, Buckinghamshire, he moved to Hebden near Grassington in 1980. He went to Burnsall Primary School in Burnsall then Upper Wharfedale School, a secondary modern school in Threshfield. He then completed sixth form at South Craven School, a secondary school near Skipton. Before studying Environmental Science at the Stoke campus of University of Staffordshire where he took up the sport of rowing with the Boat Club on Rudyard Lake and St Catherine's College, Oxford where he undertook an MSc in Water Science, Policy and Management.

== Rowing career ==
=== Boat Race ===
Whilst at Oxford University, Hodge was a member of Oxford University Boat Club and took part in the Boat Race in 2005. Both universities had extremely strong intakes that year, with Cambridge boasting several world champions and the Oxford crew including 2004 Olympic silver medallist Barney Williams and eventual Beijing and London coxless four crewmate Pete Reed. Oxford, stroked by Hodge, won the epic contest by 2 lengths in a time of 16 minutes 42 seconds.

=== International ===
Hodge won his first senior international vest in 2002. He sat in the four seat of the Great Britain Eight, which made the final of the World Rowing Championships in Seville. He occupied the same seat a year later when the Eight won the World Cup event at Lucerne, and a bronze medal at the championships in Milan.

2004 was the year that Hodge entered the British rowing scene. The buildup to the Athens 2004 Olympics for the GB Men's Rowing Squad was somewhat disrupted due to illness, injury and variable form. Hodge and his partner Alex Partridge then won the final selection trials. Partridge was promoted to Britain's top boat until sidelined by injury, Hodge remained in the eight. Illness to the Eight's stroke – Tom James – the night before their Heat in the Olympic competition was a particular blow, and whilst James returned for the repechage, the crew failed to make the final, finishing 9th overall.

Having stroked Oxford to victory in the 2005 Boat Race, Hodge returned to international competition. Following the retirement of Matthew Pinsent, James Cracknell and Ed Coode, a new coxless four was formed with Andrew, his Oxford crewmate Pete Reed, Alex Partridge and Olympic Champion Steve Williams.

Hodge went on to win gold with this crew (Tom James was promoted in place of Alex Partridge) at the Beijing 2008 Olympics, defending Great Britain's title in the event. Post-Olympics Hodge and Reed decided to attempt a pair project with a view to competing at the London 2012 Olympics in that event. Due to the emergence of the New Zealand pair of Eric Murray and Hamish Bond (future world best time holders and Olympic champions), a gold medal in the event was unlikely and so the pair were moved back into the coxless four in 2012 to strengthen that boat's chances. The crew of Hodge, Reed, Tom James and Alex Gregory went on to win the gold medal at the Olympic rowing regatta and beat their Australian rivals who had pushed them hard through the season.

Hodge was world champion in the men's eight and four during 2013 and 2014 respectively. After being diagnosed with glandular fever during 2015, Hodge was forced to miss the entire racing season. He began his comeback in the autumn of 2015 and was selected to represent Great Britain at the Rio 2016 Olympics in the men's eight. After an inconsistent season, the British eight won Olympic gold on the Lagoa Rodrigo de Freitas in Rio over Germany and the Netherlands. He announced his retirement after the Olympics.

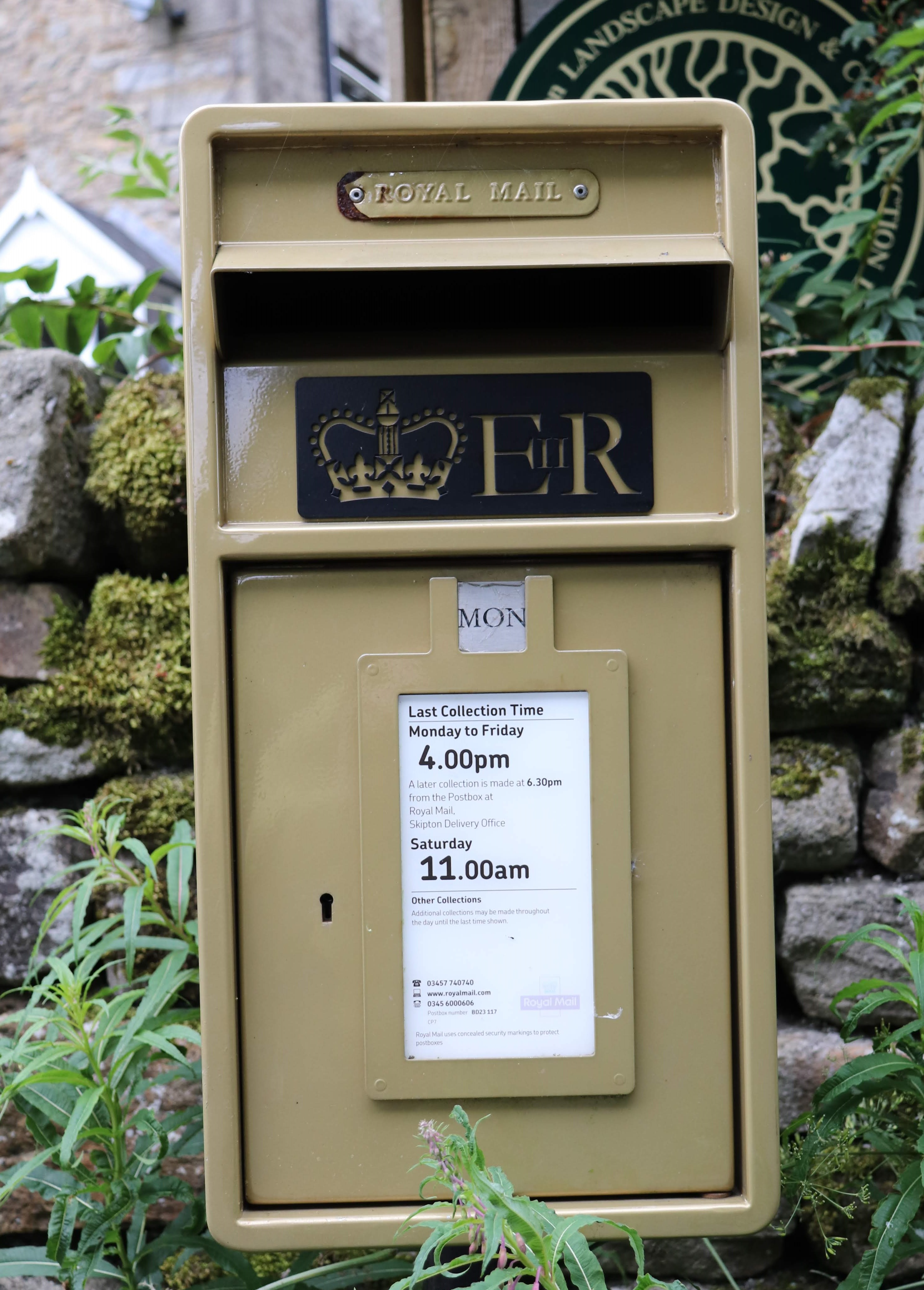
Gold postbox for Andrew Triggs Hodge in Hebden

=== Other ===
Hodge has been a member of Molesey Boat Club since 2000 when he moved to London.

Just hours after winning the 2005 World Cup event at Dorney Lake, Eton, Hodge made a guest appearance in St Catherine's College 1st VIII, who were competing in Summer Eights. He was joined in that crew by fellow international competitors Christopher Liwski and Colin Smith. The crew bumped Hertford College that day.

Hodge was appointed Member of the Order of the British Empire (MBE) in the 2009 New Year Honours and Officer of the Order of the British Empire (OBE) in the 2017 New Year Honours for services to rowing.

== Achievements ==
=== Olympics ===
- 2016 Rio de Janeiro – Gold, Eight (three)
- 2012 London – Gold, coxless four (stroke)
- 2008 Beijing – Gold, coxless four (stroke)
- 2004 Athens – 9th, Eight (four)

=== World championships ===
- 2014 Amsterdam – Gold, Coxless Four (stroke)
- 2013 Chungju – Gold, Eight (six)
- 2011 Bled – Silver, Coxless Pair (stroke)
- 2010 Karapiro – Silver, Coxless Pair (stroke)
- 2009 Poznań – Silver, Coxless Pair (stroke)
- 2007 Munich – 4th, Coxless Four (stroke)
- 2006 Eton – Gold, Coxless Four (stroke)
- 2005 Gifu – Gold, Coxless Four (stroke)
- 2003 Milan – Bronze, Eight (four)
- 2002 Seville – 6th, Eight (four)

=== World Cups ===
- 2013 Eton Dorney – Gold, Eight (Stroke)
- 2013 Sydney – Gold, Eight (Stroke)
- 2012 Belgrade – Gold, Coxless Four (stroke)
- 2011 Lucerne – Silver, Coxless Pair (stroke)
- 2011 Munich – Gold, Coxless Pair (stroke)
- 2009 Banyoles – Gold, Coxless Pair (stroke)
- 2008 Poznań – Silver, Coxless Four (stroke)
- 2008 Munich – Gold, Coxless Four (stroke)
- 2007 Lucerne – Silver, Coxless Four (stroke)
- 2007 Amsterdam – Gold, Eight (six)
- 2007 Linz – Gold, Coxless Four (stroke)
- 2006 Lucerne – Gold, Coxless Four (stroke)
- 2006 Poznań – Gold, Coxless Four (stroke)
- 2006 Munich – Gold, Coxless Four (stroke)
- 2005 Lucerne – Gold, Coxless Four (stroke)
- 2005 Munich – Gold, Coxless Four (stroke)
- 2005 Eton – Gold, Coxless Four (stroke)
- 2004 Lucerne – 6th, Eight (four)
- 2004 Munich – 4th, Eight (four)
- 2004 Poznań – 5th, Eight (four)
- 2003 Milan – Bronze, Eight (four)
- 2003 Lucerne – Gold, Eight (four)
- 2003 Munich – Bronze, Eight (four)
- 2002 Munich – 6th, Eight (four)
- 2002 Lucerne – 6th, Eight (four)

=== World Rowing Under 23 championships ===
- 2001 – 6th, Coxed Four

=== GB Rowing Senior Trials ===
- 2010–2012 – 1st, Coxless Pair
- 2004–2008 – 1st, Coxless Pair

== Personal life ==
Hodge is married to Dutch physician and former international rower Eeke Thomee. They have two children.

== See also ==
- 2012 Summer Olympics and Paralympics gold post boxes
