= 2019 World Rowing Championships – Men's eight =

Men's eight at the 2019 World Rowing Championships
- Venue: Linz-Ottensheim
- Location: Ottensheim, Austria
- Dates: 27 August – 1 September
- Competitors: 91 from 10 nations
- Winning time: 5:19.41

Medalists
gold medal	Johannes Weißenfeld; Laurits Follert; Christopher Reinhardt; Torben Johannesen; Jakob Schneider; Malte Jakschik; Richard Schmidt; Hannes Ocik; Martin Sauer	Germany
silver medal	Mechiel Versluis; Ruben Knab; Jasper Tissen; Simon van Dorp; Maarten Hurkmans; Bram Schwarz; Bjorn van den Ende; Robert Lücken; Aranka Kops	Netherlands
bronze medal	Thomas George; James Rudkin; Josh Bugajski; Moe Sbihi; Jacob Dawson; Oliver Wynne-Griffith; Matthew Tarrant; Thomas Ford; Henry Fieldman	Great Britain

The men's eight competition at the 2019 World Rowing Championships took place at the Linz-Ottensheim regatta venue. A top-five finish ensured qualification for the Tokyo Olympics.

== Schedule ==
The schedule was as follows:

Date	Time	Round
Tuesday 27 August 2019	12:35	Heats
Thursday 29 August 2019	13:59	Repechage
Sunday 1 September 2019	12:42	Final B
Sunday 1 September 2019	14:12	Final A

All times are Central European Summer Time (UTC+2)

== Results ==
=== Heats ===
The two fastest boats in each heat advanced directly to the A final. The remaining boats were sent to the repechage.

==== Heat 1 ====
Rank	Rowers	Country	Time	Notes
1	Weißenfeld, Follert, Reinhardt, Johannesen, Schneider, Jakschik, Schmidt, Ocik, Sauer	Germany	5:30.28	FA
2	Forsterling, Purnell, Moore, Keenan, Booth, Masters, Turrin, Widdicombe, Brodie	Australia	5:32.91	FA
3	Copp, Perry, Stone, de Wit, Barakso, Bailey, Buczek, Crothers, Thompson-Willie	Canada	5:35.46	R
4	Gabbia, Liuzzi, Parlato, Perino, Fiume, Paonessa, Mumolo, Pietra, D'Aniello	Italy	5:42.74	R
5	Rudnichenko, Kuznetsov, Lomachev, Kulesh, Yaganov, Stepanov, Ivanov, Andrienko, Safonkin	Russia	5:43.71	R

==== Heat 2 ====
Rank	Rowers	Country	Time	Notes
1	George, Rudkin, Bugajski, Sbihi, Dawson, Wynne-Griffith, Tarrant, Ford, Fieldman	Great Britain	5:25.91	FA
2	Karwoski, Eble, Harrity, Mead, Richards, di Santo, Davison, Hack, Venonsky	United States	5:26.41	FA
3	Versluis, Knab, Tissen, van Dorp, Hurkmans, Schwarz, van den Ende, Lücken, Kops	Netherlands	5:26.75	R
4	Lassche, Bond, Kirkham, Drysdale, Robertson, Wilson, MacDonald, Jones, Bosworth	New Zealand	5:35.73	R
5	Chioseaua, Damii, Matinca, Adam, Pîrghie, Bejan, Aicoboae, Macovei, Munteanu	Romania	5:42.30	R

=== Repechage ===
The two fastest boats advanced to the A final. The remaining boats were sent to the B final.

Rank	Rowers	Country	Time	Notes
1	van den Ende, Knab, Tissen, van Dorp, Hurkmans, Schwarz, Versluis, Lücken, Kops	Netherlands	5:21.60	FA
2	Lassche, Bond, Kirkham, Drysdale, Robertson, Wilson, MacDonald, Jones, Bosworth	New Zealand	5:24.66	FA
3	Chioseaua, Damii, Radu, Adam, Pîrghie, Bejan, Aicoboae, Macovei, Munteanu	Romania	5:27.19	FB
4	Copp, Perry, Stone, de Wit, Barakso, Bailey, Buczek, Crothers, Thompson-Willie	Canada	5:30.60	FB
5	Gabbia, Liuzzi, Parlato, Perino, Fiume, Paonessa, Mumolo, Pietra, D'Aniello	Italy	5:34.59	FB
6	Rudnichenko, Kuznetsov, Lomachev, Kulesh, Yaganov, Stepanov, Ivanov, Andrienko, Safonkin	Russia	5:38.10	FB

=== Finals ===
The A final determined the rankings for places 1 to 6. Additional rankings were determined in the B final.

==== Final B ====
Rank	Rowers	Country	Time
1	Chioseaua, Damii, Matinca, Adam, Pîrghie, Bejan, Aicoboae, Macovei, Munteanu	Romania	5:38.91
2	Copp, Perry, Stone, de Wit, Barakso, Bailey, Buczek, Crothers, Thompson-Willie	Canada	5:42.09
3	Gabbia, Liuzzi, Parlato, Perino, Fiume, Paonessa, Mumolo, Pietra, D'Aniello	Italy	5:48.33
4	Rudnichenko, Kuznetsov, Lomachev, Kulesh, Yaganov, Stepanov, Ivanov, Andrienko, Safonkin	Russia	5:54.41

==== Final A ====
Rank	Rowers	Country	Time
1st place, gold medalist(s)	Weißenfeld, Follert, Reinhardt, Johannesen, Schneider, Jakschik, Schmidt, Ocik, Sauer	Germany	5:19.41
2nd place, silver medalist(s)	Versluis, Knab, Tissen, van Dorp, Hurkmans, Schwarz, van den Ende, Lücken, Kops	Netherlands	5:19.96
3rd place, bronze medalist(s)	George, Rudkin, Bugajski, Sbihi, Dawson, Wynne-Griffith, Tarrant, Ford, Fieldman	Great Britain	5:22.35
4	Forsterling, Purnell, Moore, Keenan, Booth, Masters, Turrin, Widdicombe, Brodie	Australia	5:22.88
5	Karwoski, Eble, Harrity, Mead, Richards, di Santo, Davison, Hack, Venonsky	United States	5:23.92
6	Lassche, Bond, Kirkham, Drysdale, Robertson, Wilson, MacDonald, Jones, Bosworth	New Zealand	5:24.470
