= 2018 World Rowing Championships – Men's eight =

Men's eight at the 2018 World Rowing Championships
- Venue: Plovdiv Regatta Venue
- Location: Plovdiv, Bulgaria
- Dates: 12–16 September
- Competitors: 81 from 9 nations
- Winning time: 5:24.31

Medalists
gold medal	Johannes Weißenfeld; Felix Wimberger; Max Planer; Torben Johannesen; Jakob Schneider; Malte Jakschik; Richard Schmidt; Hannes Ocik; Martin Sauer	Germany
silver medal	Liam Donald; Robert Black; Angus Moore; Simon Keenan; Nicholas Purnell; Timothy Masters; Josh Booth; Angus Widdicombe; Kendall Brodie	Australia
bronze medal	James Rudkin; Alan Sinclair; Tom Ransley; Thomas George; Moe Sbihi; Oliver Wynne-Griffith; Matthew Tarrant; Will Satch; Henry Fieldman	Great Britain

The men's eight competition at the 2018 World Rowing Championships in Plovdiv took place at the Plovdiv Regatta Venue.

== Schedule ==
The schedule was as follows:

Date	Time	Round
Wednesday 12 September 2018	11:33	Heats
Friday 14 September 2018	08:53	Repechage
Sunday 16 September 2018	11:18	Final B
Sunday 16 September 2018	13:15	Final A

All times are Eastern European Summer Time (UTC+3)

== Results ==
=== Heats ===
The two fastest boats in each heat advanced directly to the A final. The remaining boats were sent to the repechage.

==== Heat 1 ====
Rank	Rowers	Country	Time	Notes
1	Karwoski, Ochal, Peszek, Dethlefs, Harrity, di Santo, Reed, Eble, Venonsky	United States	5:19.20	FA
2	Donald, Black, Moore, Keenan, Purnell, Masters, Booth, Widdicombe, Brodie	Australia	5:19.25	FA
3	Rudkin, Sinclair, Ransley, George, Sbihi, Wynne-Griffith, Tarrant, Satch, Fieldman	Great Britain	5:25.46	R
4	Wilson, Robertson, O'Leary, Webster, Kirkham, Grainger, Lassche, Jones, Shepherd	New Zealand	5:27.80	R
5	Buczek, Buie, Schrijver, de Wit, Barakso, de Groot, Langerfeld, McCabe, Gumley	Canada	5:34.24	R

==== Heat 2 ====
Rank	Rowers	Country	Time	Notes
1	Weißenfeld, Wimberger, Planer, Johannesen, Schneider, Jakschik, Schmidt, Ocik, Sauer	Germany	5:22.88	FA
2	Abagnale, Perino, Parlato, Liuzzi, Venier, Paonessa, Mumolo, Pietra, D'Aniello	Italy	5:24.30	FA
3	van der Want, Röell, Hurkmans, van Dorp, Versluis, Knab, van den Herik, Robbers, van Engelenburg	Netherlands	5:24.65	R
4	Aicoboae, Damii, Matinca, Radu, Adam, Bejan, Pîrghie, Macovei, Munteanu	Romania	5:30.63	R

=== Repechage ===
The two fastest boats advanced to the A final. The remaining boats were sent to the B final.

Rank	Rowers	Country	Time	Notes
1	Rudkin, Sinclair, Ransley, George, Sbihi, Wynne-Griffith, Tarrant, Satch, Fieldman	Great Britain	5:25.03	FA
2	Aicoboae, Damii, Matinca, Radu, Adam, Bejan, Pîrghie, Macovei, Munteanu	Romania	5:26.01	FA
3	van der Want, Röell, Hurkmans, van Dorp, Versluis, Knab, van den Herik, Robbers, van Engelenburg	Netherlands	5:28.75	FB
4	Buczek, Buie, Schrijver, de Wit, Barakso, de Groot, Langerfeld, McCabe, Gumley	Canada	5:29.46	FB
5	Wilson, Robertson, O'Leary, Webster, Kirkham, Grainger, Lassche, Jones, Shepherd	New Zealand	5:30.03	FB

=== Finals ===
The A final determined the rankings for places 1 to 6. Additional rankings were determined in the B final.

==== Final B ====
Rank	Rowers	Country	Time
1	van der Want, Röell, Hurkmans, van Dorp, Versluis, Knab, van den Herik, Robbers, van Engelenburg	Netherlands	5:24.52
2	Buczek, Buie, Schrijver, de Wit, Barakso, de Groot, Langerfeld, McCabe, Gumley	Canada	5:27.97
3	Wilson, Robertson, O'Leary, Webster, Kirkham, Grainger, Lassche, Jones, Shepherd	New Zealand	5:31.49

==== Final A ====
Rank	Rowers	Country	Time
1st place, gold medalist(s)	Weißenfeld, Wimberger, Planer, Johannesen, Schneider, Jakschik, Schmidt, Ocik, Sauer	Germany	5:24.31
2nd place, silver medalist(s)	Donald, Black, Moore, Keenan, Purnell, Masters, Booth, Widdicombe, Brodie	Australia	5:26.11
3rd place, bronze medalist(s)	Rudkin, Sinclair, Ransley, George, Sbihi, Wynne-Griffith, Tarrant, Satch, Fieldman	Great Britain	5:26.14
4	Karwoski, Ochal, Peszek, Dethlefs, Harrity, di Santo, Reed, Eble, Venonsky	United States	5:26.31
5	Abagnale, Perino, Parlato, Liuzzi, Venier, Paonessa, Mumolo, Pietra, D'Aniello	Italy	5:29.79
6	Aicoboae, Damii, Matinca, Radu, Adam, Bejan, Pîrghie, Macovei, Munteanu	Romania	5:30.43
