= Jacob Dawson (rower) =

British rower (born 1993)

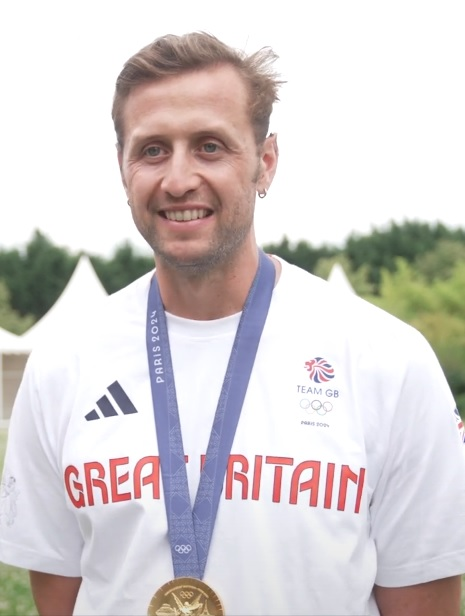
- Dawson at the 2024 Summer Olympics

Personal information
- Nationality: British
- Born: 2 November 1993 (age 33) Gosport, England, United Kingdom
- Height: 1.95 m (6 ft 5 in)

Sport
- Country: Great Britain
- Sport: Rowing
- Events: Coxless four, Eight
- Club: Leander Club
Medal record
Men's rowing
Representing Great Britain
Olympic Games
Gold medal – first place	2024 Paris	Eight
Bronze medal – third place	2020 Tokyo	Eight
World Championships
Gold medal – first place	2023 Belgrade	Eight
Bronze medal – third place	2018 Plovdiv	Coxless four
Bronze medal – third place	2019 Ottensheim	Eight
European Championships
Gold medal – first place	2021 Varese	Eight
Gold medal – first place	2023 Bled	Eight
Gold medal – first place	2024 Szeged	Eight
Silver medal – second place	2018 Glasgow	Coxless four
Silver medal – second place	2019 Lucerne	Eight

Jacob Dawson (born 2 November 1993) is a rower representing Great Britain. He is an Olympic and world champion with both those titles won in the men's eight event.

== Club and varsity rowing ==
Dawson was introduced to rowing at age 14 at the Start Centre in his hometown of Plymouth, England. His early club rowing was from the Plymouth Amateur Rowing Club. He attended the Plymstock Secondary School.

Following his success at the Coupe de la Jeunesse in 2011, Dawson was offered an athletic scholarship at the University of Washington. He studied geography and participated in their senior rowing program. He raced in the Huskies' 1st varsity eight in three of his four racing seasons at the university and was team captain in his senior year.

Since making the senior British representative squad in 2017, Dawson's club rowing has been with Leander Club. In 2023, he won the Grand Challenge Cup (the blue riband event at the Henley Royal Regatta) rowing in a composite Leander/Oxford Brookes eight .

== Representative rowing career ==
Dawson first represented for Great Britain at the 2011 Coupe de la Jeunesse where he won two events in a quad scull.

Following completion of his studies at the University of Washington, Dawson was selected in the senior Great Britain representative squad in 2017. He started in a coxless pair for World Rowing Cup I but by WRC II he'd moved in the men's eight. In that crew he placed seventh at the 2017 World Rowing Championships

In 2018 Dawson rowed in the British men's coxless four and in that boat he won a bronze medal at the 2018 World Rowing Championships in Plovdiv, Bulgaria, with Thomas Ford, Adam Neill and James Johnston.

2019 saw Dawson back in the five seat in the British men's eight. He won a silver medal in the eight at the 2019 European Rowing Championships, and then won bronze at the 2019 World Rowing Championships in Ottensheim, Austria rowing with Thomas George, James Rudkin, Josh Bugajski, Moe Sbihi, Oliver Wynne-Griffith, Matthew Tarrant, Thomas Ford and Henry Fieldman.

In 2021, he won a European gold medal in the eight in Varese, Italy. At that year's delayed 2020 Tokyo Olympics he rowed in the two seat of the Great Britain men's eight. They finished 3rd in their heat but proceeded through a repechage to make the Olympic final. In the final they rowed level with the ultimate winner New Zealand at each mark but finished with a bronze medal being pipped for silver in the last 500m by the fast finishing Deutschlandachter.

Dawson became a world champion from the bow seat of the British eight at the 2023 World Rowing Championships. In that crew he had earlier won gold that season at the 2023 European Rowing Championships and had finished first, then second at World Rowing Cups II and III.

He won a gold medal as part of the Great Britain eight at the 2024 Summer Olympics.
