= Lo Bue =

Lo Bue is a surname. Notable people with the surname include:

- Carmen LoBue, American filmmaker and playwright
- Giorgia Lo Bue (born 1994), Italian rower
- Serena Lo Bue (born 1995), Italian rower
- Steven LoBue (born 1985), American diver

== See also ==
- Bue (surname)
- Commissioner v. LoBue
