= Torben Johannesen =

German rower (born 1994)

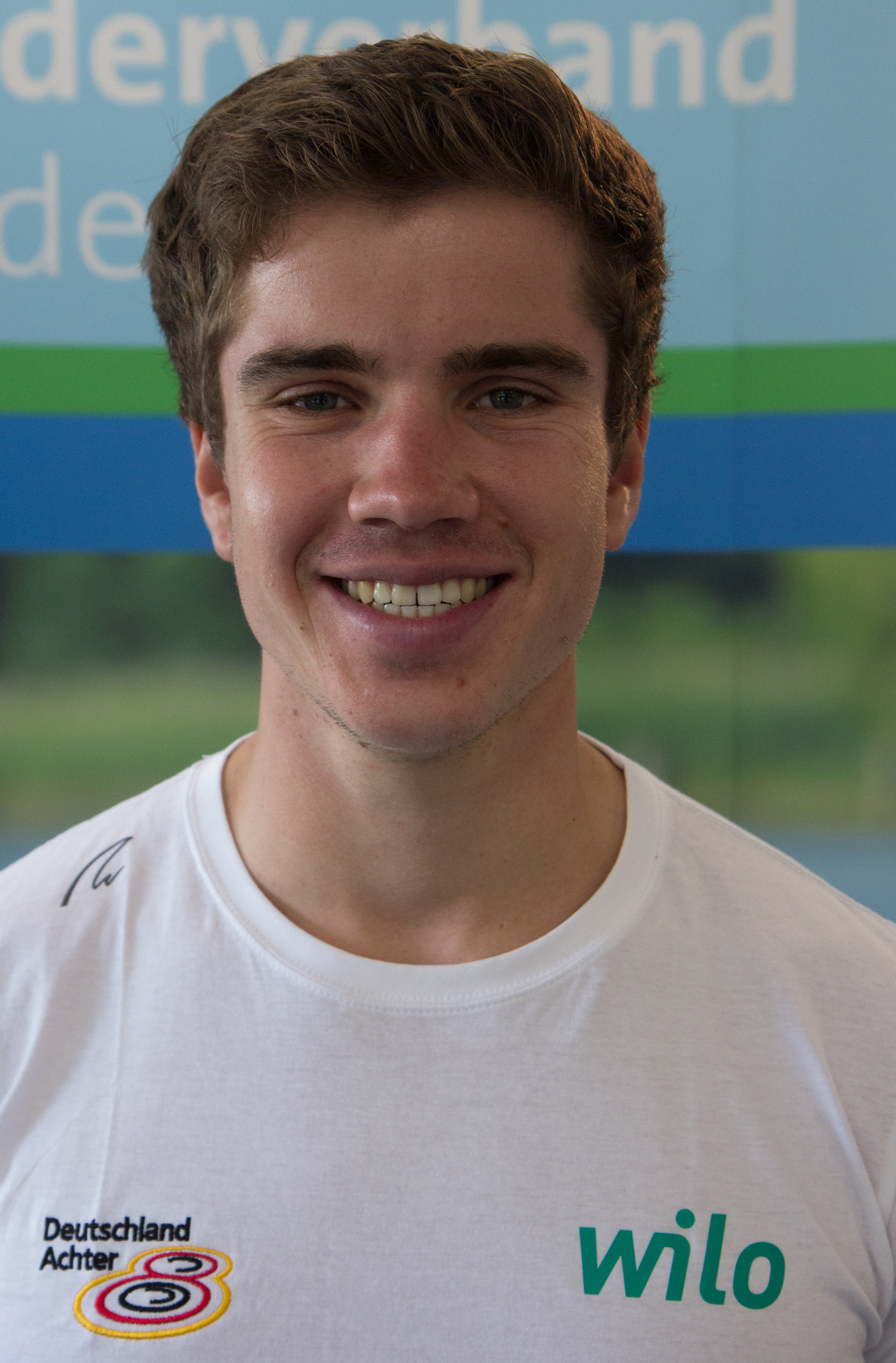
- Johannesen in 2017

Personal information
- Nationality: German
- Born: 21 September 1994 (age 31) Hamburg, Germany
- Height: 1.87 m (6 ft 2 in)
- Weight: 89 kg (196 lb)

Sport
- Country: Germany
- Sport: Rowing
- Event: Eight
- Club: Ruder-Club Favorite Hammonia
Medal record
Men's rowing
Representing Germany
Olympic Games
Silver medal – second place	2020 Tokyo	Eight
World Championships
Gold medal – first place	2017 Sarasota	Eight
Gold medal – first place	2018 Plovdiv	Eight
Gold medal – first place	2019 Ottensheim	Eight
European Championships
Gold medal – first place	2017 Račice	Eight
Gold medal – first place	2018 Glasgow	Eight
Gold medal – first place	2019 Lucerne	Eight
Silver medal – second place	2024 Szeged	Eight

Torben Johannesen (born 21 September 1994) is a German representative rower. He is an Olympic silver medallist and was a three time world champion as a member of the German men's eight — the Deutschlandachter — who dominated the men's eight event from 2017 to 2019. He rowed at four when the Deutschlandachter at the 2017 World Rowing Cup II set a world's best time of 5.18.68, which was still the standing world mark as of 2021. His older brother Eric is also a world champion rower.

== International rowing career ==
Johannesen's representative debut for Germany came in 2011 when he was selected to row in a coxed four at the World Junior Rowing Championships at Eton Dorney. In 2012 Johannesen was again selected to represent at the Junior World Championships, this time in a men's pair which placed fourth.

2013 saw Johannesen move into the German U23 men's coxed four which won a bronze medal at the World U23 Rowing Championships and then in 2014 to the U23 men's eight which placed fourth at the U23 World Championships in Linz, Austria. He moved between the senior eight and the U23 eight in 2015 and stroked the German U23 men'ss eight when they won a World Championship at the 2015 World Rowing U23 Championships in Plovdiv.

2016 saw him vying for a seat in the German men's eight and in 2017 he secured the four seat and held it throughout their dominant season campaign, winning gold at the European Championships, two World Rowing Cups and ultimately at the 2017 World Rowing Championships in Sarasota, Florida where the German eight were crowned as world champions. In June 2017 at the World Rowing Cup II in Poznan they set a new world's best time for the eight, taking 0.67 seconds off a 2012 mark that had been set by Canada. The German crew with every man holding the same seat, continued their European and world dominance throughout 2018 winning at three World Rowing Cups, the 2018 European Championships and then defending their world title at the 2018 World Rowing Championships in Plovdiv. There were a handful of changes to the German eight in 2019 but Johannesen stayed in the engine room at four for another successful international season which culminated in his third successive world championship title at the 2019 World Rowing Championships in Ottensheim.

Their 2019 performances qualified that boat for Tokyo 2020. By the time of the 2021 selections for those delayed Olympics, Johannesen was still in the crew and set to make his Olympic rowing debut. At that Tokyo 2021 Olympic regatta he rowed at four in the German eight to an Olympic silver medal.
