= Joseph O'Brien (rower) =

Australian rower (born 1998)

Jack O'Brien
Personal information
- Full name: Joseph O'Brien
- Born: 1 March 1998 (age 28) Dubbo, New South Wales, Australia
- Education: St Joseph's, Hunters Hill
- Years active: 2017–current
- Height: 1.94 m (6 ft 4 in)

Sport
- Country: Australia
- Sport: Rowing
- Club: Sydney University Boat Club

Achievements and titles
- Olympic finals: Tokyo 2020 M8+
- National finals: King's Cup 2019–2022
Medal record
Men's rowing
Representing Australia
World Championships
Silver medal – second place	2022 Račice	Coxless four
Bronze medal – third place	2023 Belgrade	Eight

Joseph "Jack" O'Brien (born 1 March 1998) is an Australian representative rower. He is an Australian national champion, has represented and won a silver medal at senior world championships and has won several gold medals at World Rowing Cups. He rowed in the Australian men's eight at the Tokyo 2020 Olympics.

== Club and state rowing ==
Born in Dubbo, New South Wales, O'Brien was boarding at Tudor House School in Bowral from an early age and then attended St Joseph's College Hunters Hill where he took up rowing. His senior club rowing has been from the Sydney University Boat Club.

O'Brien's first state representation for New South Wales came in 2017 when he was selected in the New South Wales youth eight to contest the Noel F Wilkinson Trophy at the Interstate Regatta within the Australian Rowing Championships. He stroked that crew to Interstate Championship victories in both 2017 and 2018.

In 2019 O'Brien was selected in the New South Wales men's senior eight which won the King's Cup at the Interstate Regatta. At the New South Wales State Championships in February 2020 rowing with Jack Hargreaves, he won the men's elite pair. In 2021 he stroked the New South Wales men's eight to their second placing in the King's Cup. At that year's Australian championships he stroked a composite coxless four of Australian representative squad oarsmen who finished 2nd in that national title event to another Australian selection trial crew. He again rowed in the victorious New South Wales King's Cup eight of 2022.

== International representative rowing ==
O'Brien made his Australian representative debut in the coxed four at the World Junior Rowing Championships in 2016. They rowed to a fifth placing. In 2018 he was selected with Andrew Judge in a coxless pair to compete at both the World Rowing U23 Championships and the World Championships. They finished in seventh pace at the U/23 championships and in 13th place at the World Championships in Plovdiv.

In 2019 O'Brien was selected in the Australian senior men's sweep squad for the international representative season. In an effort to qualify the men's pair for the 2020 Olympics, selectors broke up the Australian dual world champion coxless four into other boats giving O'Brien an opportunity in the four. Rowing with Tim Masters, Nicholas Purnell and Jack Hargreaves, O'Brien took the gold medal in the Australian coxless four at both the World Rowing Cup II in Poznan and at WRC III in Rotterdam. O'Brien, Hargreaves, Hill, and Purnell were selected to race Australia's coxless four at the 2019 World Rowing Championships in Linz, Austria. The four were looking for a top eight finish at the 2019 World Championships to qualify for the Tokyo Olympics. They won their heat and semi-final, thereby qualifying the boat for Tokyo 2020. Unexpectedly as race favourites, they finished last in the final for an overall world sixth place.

By the time of national team selections in 2021 for the delayed Tokyo Olympics, Spencer Turrin regained the stroke seat in the Australian coxless four and O'Brien was selected to stroke the Australian men's senior eight which had also qualified on its 2019 international performances. In Tokyo the Australian men's eight placed fourth in their heat, fourth in the repechage and sixth in the Olympic A final. Had they repeated their repechage time of 5:25:06 they would have won the silver medal.

In 2022 O'Brien regained a seat in the reigning Olympic men's champion four with Hargreaves, Purnell and Turrin as the coxless four in the Australian squad for the 2022 international season and the 2022 World Rowing Championships. With O'Brien at stroke they took gold at the World Rowing Cup II in Poznan in June, won the Stewards Challenge Cup at the Henley Royal Regatta in July and a week later finished second at the WRC III in Lucerne. At the 2022 World Rowing Championships at Racize, he stroked the Australian coxless four to a silver medal.

In March 2023 with Alexander Hill's return to the champion Australian men's coxless four, O'Brien was selected in the Australian senior men's eight squad for the 2023 international season. At the Rowing World Cup II in Varese, Italy O'Brien raced as Australia's 2- entrant with Angus Dawson. They finished 3rd in the A final to win the bronze medal. At 2023's RWC III in Lucerne, O'Brien and Dawson were selected into the Australian men's eight. In the final the Australian eight rowed stroke for stroke with their fancied Great Britain rivals but then moved away at the 1000m mark and held on for an upset gold medal victory. For the 2023 World Rowing Championships in Belgrade Serbia, the Australian men's eight was left unchanged and O'Brien again raced in the six seat. They won their heat powering past the USA eight who had headed them at the 1000m mark. In the A final Australia and Great Britain traded the lead over the first 1000m, but beyond that point the result mirrored that of 2022 with Great Britain exerting dominance by the 1500m, fighting off a fast finishing Dutch eight who took silver and leaving the Australians with the bronze for the second successive year.
