= Robert Black (rower) =

Australian rower (born 1995)

Personal information
- Born: 25 September 1995 (age 30)
- Education: The King's School
- Years active: 2008–current

Sport
- Country: Australia
- Sport: Rowing
- Club: Mosman Rowing Club

Achievements and titles
- National finals: King's Cup 2016, 2018, 2019
Medal record
Men's rowing
Representing Australia
World Championships
Silver medal – second place	2018 Plovdiv	Eight

Robert Black (born 25 September 1995) is an Australian rower. He is a national champion, a national representative in sculling and sweep-oared boats and twice an U23 World Champion.

== Club and state rowing ==
Black was educated at The King's School where he took up rowing in 2008. His senior club rowing is from the Mosman Rowing Club in Sydney. He fell in love with this sport at his school. He stated in an interview, "when I was in year 7 at school and watching my school's first eights race at the Head of The River. That was the day I fell in love with the sport."

He debuted at state representative level for New South Wales in the 2014 youth eight which contested the Noel Wilkinson Trophy at the Interstate Regatta within the 2014 Australian Rowing Championships. He stroked that crew and did the same again in 2015 when his New South eight won the Interstate youth eight title. He first rowed in the New South Wales men's senior eight contesting the 2016 King's Cup at the Interstate Regatta. In 2018 and 2019 he stroked the New South Wales eight to a King's Cup victory.

At the 2017 Australian Rowing Championships in Mosman colours he won the national coxless pair title, rowing with Mercantile's Liam Donald.

== International representative rowing ==
Black made his Australian representative debut while still at school in 2013 selected in a junior quad scull to contest the 2013 Junior World Rowing Championships in Trakai. That quad rowed to an eleventh place finish.

In 2015 he was picked again in a quad scull for the World Rowing U23 Championships in Plovdiv, Bulgaria and finished in third place. In 2016 and 2017 he again rowed in Australian crews at the World Rowing U23 Championships and both years rowed to a gold medal. He was in the quad scull in Rotterdam in 2016 and in a coxless four at Plovdiv in 2017.

Black made his first national senior squad appearances in the Australian men's eight in 2018 at stroke at the World Rowing Cup II in Linz and in the two seat at the WRC III in Lucerne where the Australians took a silver medal 0.14seconds behind Germany. The stage was set for the close competition that played out at the 2018 World Championships in Plovdiv. In their heat the Australian eight finished 5/100ths of a second behind the USA and then in the final, Germany dominated and took gold but 2/10ths of a second separated 2nd through to 4th and the Australians took silver, a bowball ahead of Great Britain with the US out of the medals. Black rowed in the two seat and came home with a silver world championship medal.

In 2019 Black was again selected in the Australian men's eight for the 2019 international representative season. The eight placed 5th at the World Rowing Cup II in Poznan and 6th at WRC III in Rotterdam.

== Palmares ==
Race	Year	Position
Junior World Rowing Championship	2013	11th place
World Rowing Championship	2015	3rd place
U23 World Rowing Championship	2015	3rd place
U23 World Rowing Championship	2016	1st place (gold medal)
U23 World Rowing Championship	2017	1st place (gold medal)
World Rowing Cup	2018	2nd place (silver medal)
World Championships	2018	2nd place (silver medal)
World Rowing Cup	2019	5th place
