= Moe Sbihi =

British rower

Mohamed Sbihi MBE
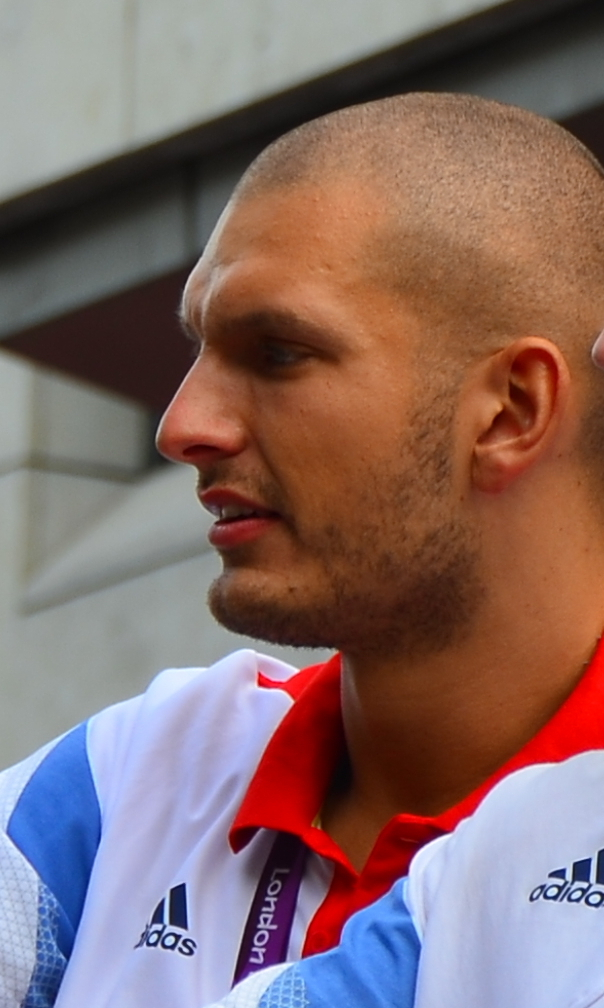
- Sbihi in 2012

Personal information
- Full name: Mohamed Karim Sbihi
- Nationality: British
- Born: 27 March 1988 (age 38) Kingston upon Thames, England, United Kingdom
- Education: St Mary's University, Twickenham
- Height: 2.03 m (6 ft 8 in)
- Weight: 103 kg (227 lb)

Sport
- Country: Great Britain
- Sport: Rowing
- Event(s): Coxless four, Eight
- Club: Molesey Boat Club
Medal record
Men's rowing
Representing Great Britain
Olympic Games
Gold medal – first place	2016 Rio de Janeiro	Coxless four
Bronze medal – third place	2012 London	Eight
Bronze medal – third place	2020 Tokyo	Eight
World Championships
Gold medal – first place	2013 Chungju	Eight
Gold medal – first place	2014 Amsterdam	Coxless four
Gold medal – first place	2015 Aiguebelette	Eight
Silver medal – second place	2010 Karapiro	Eight
Silver medal – second place	2011 Bled	Eight
Bronze medal – third place	2017 Sarasota	Coxless four
Bronze medal – third place	2018 Plovdiv	Eight
Bronze medal – third place	2019 Ottensheim	Eight
European Championships
Gold medal – first place	2014 Belgrade	Coxless four
Gold medal – first place	2016 Brandenburg	Coxless four
Gold medal – first place	2021 Varese	Eight
Silver medal – second place	2015 Poznan	Eight
Silver medal – second place	2019 Lucerne	Eight

Mohamed Karim Sbihi (born 27 March 1988) is a British rower. He is a three-time Olympian and Olympic medal winner. He won a gold medal in the coxless four at 2016 Rio Olympics, and at the 2012 London Olympics he was in the British crew that won the bronze medal in the men's eight. He returned to the eight for the 2020 Tokyo games, again winning bronze.

== Early life ==
Sbihi was born in Kingston upon Thames to a British mother and a Moroccan father. He attended Hollyfield Secondary School in Surbiton, before studying Sport Science with Health, Nutrition & Exercise at St. Mary's University College, Twickenham on a sports scholarship from 2006 to 2010. Before he joined the rowing team, he played both association football and basketball.

At the age of 15, he was identified as a potentially successful oarsman by a talent-spotting programme and joined the GB Rowing World Class Start programme. Sbihi finished first in the junior men J15 category at the 2003 Great Britain Indoor Rowing Championships.

== Career ==
At the 2012 Summer Olympics in London, United Kingdom he was part of the British crew that won the bronze medal in the eight.

In 2013, he was part of the men’s eight that won gold at the World Rowing Championships. In 2014 he won gold medals in the coxless four at both the European Rowing Championships in Belgrade and the World Championships in Amsterdam. In 2015, he won gold at the World Championships for the third consecutive year, this time in the eight again.

In the 2016 Rio Olympics, Sbihi was part of the GB coxless four. The team won the gold medal, Britain's fifth consecutive gold in the event.

He won a bronze medal at the 2017 World Rowing Championships in Sarasota, Florida, as part of the coxless four. He then won a bronze medal at the 2018 World Rowing Championships in Plovdiv, Bulgaria, as part of the eight with James Rudkin, Alan Sinclair, Tom Ransley, Thomas George, Oliver Wynne-Griffith, Matthew Tarrant, Will Satch and Henry Fieldman and won another bronze medal the following year at the 2019 World Rowing Championships in Ottensheim, Austria as part of the eight with George, Rudkin, Josh Bugajski, Jacob Dawson, Wynne-Griffith, Tarrant, Thomas Ford and Fieldman.

In 2021, he won a European gold medal in the eight in Varese, Italy.

Sbihi was selected as one of Team GB's two flag bearers for the 2020 Tokyo Summer Olympic Games Opening Ceremony, on 23 July 2021, which he described as a "huge honour". He became Great Britain's first ever Muslim flag bearer.

== Honours ==
Sbihi was made a member of the Order of the British Empire (MBE) in the Queen's 2017 New Year Honours list for services to rowing.

Olympic Games
Preceded by Andy Murray	Flagbearer for Great Britain (with Hannah Mills); Tokyo 2020	Succeeded by Incumbent
