= 2018 World Rowing Championships – Women's lightweight coxless pair =

Women's lightweight coxless pair at the 2018 World Rowing Championships
- Venue: Plovdiv Regatta Venue
- Location: Plovdiv, Bulgaria
- Dates: 14 September
- Competitors: 4 from 2 nations
- Winning time: 7:30.84

Medalists
gold medal	Serena Lo Bue; Giorgia Lo Bue	Italy
silver medal	Jennifer Sager; Jillian Zieff	United States

The women's lightweight coxless pair competition at the 2018 World Rowing Championships in Plovdiv took place at the Plovdiv Regatta Venue.

== Schedule ==
The schedule was as follows:

Date	Time	Round
Friday 14 September 2018	12:14	Final

All times are Eastern European Summer Time (UTC+3)

== Results ==
With fewer than seven entries in this event, a direct final was held to determine the rankings.

Rank	Rowers	Country	Time
1st place, gold medalist(s)	Serena Lo Bue; Giorgia Lo Bue	Italy	7:30.84
2nd place, silver medalist(s)	Jennifer Sager; Jillian Zieff	United States	7:45.50
