= Thomas Ford (rower) =

British rower (born 1992)

Tom Ford
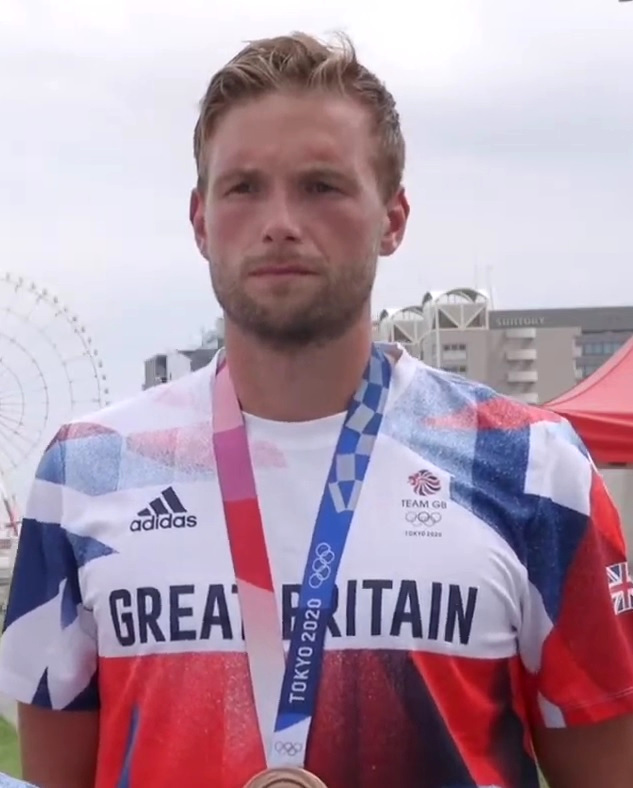
- Ford at the 2020 Summer Olympics

Personal information
- Full name: Thomas Ford
- Born: 3 October 1992 (age 34) Holmes Chapel, Cheshire, England
- Height: 1.90 m (6 ft 3 in)
- Relative: Emily Ford (sister)

Sport
- Country: Great Britain
- Sport: Rowing
- Events: Coxless four, Eight
- Club: Leander Club
Medal record
Men's rowing
Representing Great Britain
Olympic Games
Gold medal – first place	2024 Paris	Eight
Bronze medal – third place	2020 Tokyo	Eight
World Championships
Gold medal – first place	2022 Račice	Eight
Gold medal – first place	2023 Belgrade	Eight
Bronze medal – third place	2018 Plovdiv	Coxless four
Bronze medal – third place	2019 Ottensheim	Eight
European Championships
Gold medal – first place	2021 Varese	Eight
Gold medal – first place	2022 Oberschleißheim	Eight
Gold medal – first place	2023 Bled	Eight
Gold medal – first place	2024 Szeged	Eight
Silver medal – second place	2018 Glasgow	Coxless four
Silver medal – second place	2019 Lucerne	Eight

Thomas Ford (born 3 October 1992) is a British national representative rower. He is an Olympic and two-time world champion in the men's eight event.

== Club and varsity rowing ==
Ford was rowing for the Newcastle University Boat Club when he first represented for GB at the U23 level. Following graduation he joined the Leander Club. At the 2016 Henley Royal Regatta in a Leander crew he rowed to victory in the Ladies' Challenge Plate for men's intermediate eights.

In 2022, he won the Grand Challenge Cup (the blue riband event at the Henley Royal Regatta) stroking a composite Leander/Oxford Brookes crew. In 2023 again in Leander Club colours he stroked a Leander/Oxford Brookes eight to another Grand Challenge Cup victory.

== International representative career ==
Ford made his representative debut for Great Britain in the men's U23 eight which raced at the 2013 U23 World Rowing Championships in Ottensheim. That crew finished overall sixth. In 2014 he again made selection in the GB eight for the U23 World Championships.

In 2017 Ford moved into the Great Britain men's senior squad and raced in the eight at World Rowing Cups I & III and at that year's European Championships. At the 2017 World Rowing Championships he raced a coxed pair with Timothy Clarke and steered by Harry Brightmore to an overall fourth placing.

With Jacob Dawson, Adam Neill and James Johnston, Ford held a seat in the Great Britain coxless four in the 2018 international season and won a bronze medal at the 2018 World Rowing Championships in Plovdiv, Bulgaria, Ford won a silver medal in the British eight at the 2019 European Rowing Championships and then won bronze at the 2019 World Rowing Championships in Ottensheim, Austria in the eight with Thomas George, James Rudkin, Josh Bugajski, Moe Sbihi, Jacob Dawson, Oliver Wynne-Griffith, Matthew Tarrant and Henry Fieldman.

In 2021, he won a European gold medal in the eight in Varese, Italy. At that year's delayed 2020 Tokyo Olympics Ford stroked the Great Britain men's eight. They finished 3rd their heat but proceeded through a repechage to make the Olympic final. In the final they rowed level with the ultimate winner New Zealand at each mark but finished with a bronze medal being pipped for silver in the last 500m by the fast finishing German crew.

Ford became a world champion stroking the British eight to victory at the 2022 World Rowing Championships. He had earlier that season won gold at the 2022 European Rowing Championships. In 2023 he won a second successive World Championship gold medal again as the strokeman in the men's eight at the 2023 World Rowing Championships in Belgrade.

He won a gold medal as part of the Great Britain eight at the 2024 Summer Olympics.

In July 2025, Ford will be awarded an honorary degree from Keele University.

== Personal life ==
From Holmes Chapel in Cheshire, his sister Emily is also a British international rower and fellow Olympic medallist.
