= Josh Bugajski =

British rower (born 1990)

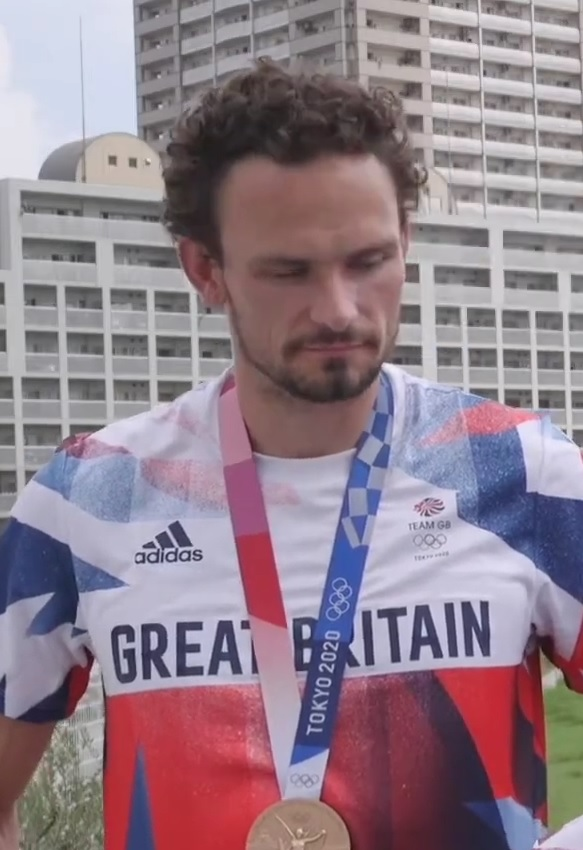
- Bugajski in 2021

Personal information
- Full name: Joshua Gregory Bugajski
- Nationality: British
- Born: 5 October 1990 (age 35) Cheadle Heath, England, U.K.
- Height: 194 cm (6 ft 4 in)

Sport
- Country: Great Britain
- Sport: Rowing
- Event: Eight
- Club: Oxford Brookes University Boat Club
Medal record
Men's rowing
Representing Great Britain
Olympic Games
Bronze medal – third place	2020 Tokyo	Eight
World Championships
Bronze medal – third place	2019 Ottensheim	Eight
European Championships
Silver medal – second place	2019 Lucerne	Eight
Gold medal – first place	2021 Varese	Eight

Joshua Gregory Bugajski (born 5 October 1990), sometimes known by the nickname "Jug", is a British rower. He won a silver medal in the eight at the 2019 European Rowing Championships. He won a bronze medal at the 2019 World Rowing Championships in Ottensheim, Austria as part of the eight with Thomas George, James Rudkin, Moe Sbihi, Jacob Dawson, Oliver Wynne-Griffith, Matthew Tarrant, Thomas Ford and Henry Fieldman.

In 2021, he won a European gold medal in the eight in Varese, Italy.
