= BUE =

BUE may refer to:

- The British University in Egypt, a private university in Egypt
- Built up edge, a phenomenon of single point cutting operations in steel
- Bue (surname), a family name
- Bué, a village in France
- Buenos Aires, the capital of Argentina
