= Jakob Schneider =

German rower

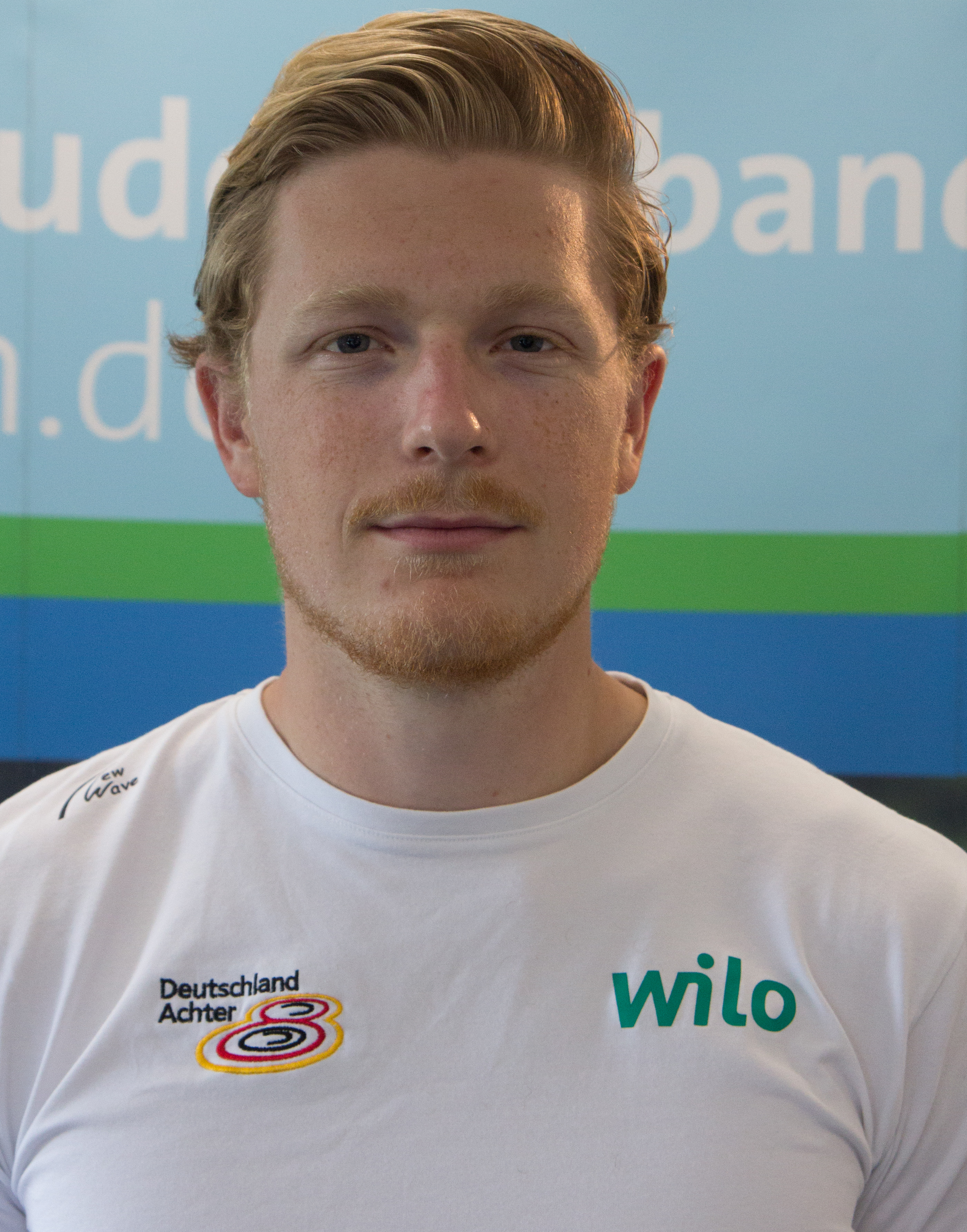
- Schneider in 2017

Personal information
- Nationality: German
- Born: 18 April 1994 (age 32) Ihringen, Germany
- Height: 1.96 m (6 ft 5 in)
- Weight: 93 kg (205 lb)

Sport
- Country: Germany
- Sport: Rowing
- Event(s): Coxed pair, Eight
- Club: Ruderklub am Baldeneysee e.V.
Medal record
Men's rowing
Representing Germany
Olympic Games
Silver medal – second place	2020 Tokyo	Eight
World Championships
Gold medal – first place	2017 Sarasota	Eight
Gold medal – first place	2018 Plovdiv	Eight
Gold medal – first place	2019 Ottensheim	Eight
Silver medal – second place	2015 Aiguebelette	Coxed pair
European Championships
Gold medal – first place	2017 Račice	Eight
Gold medal – first place	2018 Glasgow	Eight
Gold medal – first place	2019 Lucerne	Eight

Jakob Schneider (born 18 April 1994) is a German former representative rower. He is an Olympic silver medallist and was a three time world champion as a member of the German men's eight — the Deutschlandachter — which dominated the men's eight event from 2017 to 2019. He rowed at five when the Deutschlandachter at the 2017 World Rowing Cup II set a world's best time of 5.18.68, which was still the standing world mark as of 2021.

== International rowing career ==
Schneider's representative debut for Germany came in 2012 when he was selected to row in a junior German men's four which took a bronze medal at the 2012 Junior World Championships in Plovdiv. He did not represent at the international level in 2013 but in 2014 rowed in a coxless four which won a silver medal at the U23 World Championships in Linz, Austria. Both those underage medals wins were in crews with Johannes Weißenfeld with whom Schneider would later win his three senior world championships.

Schneider in 2015 was elevated to the German senior squad and into a coxed pair which won a silver medal at the 2015 World Rowing Championships in Aiguebelette. In 2016 he rowed in the German U23 men's eight which placed third at the World U23 Rowing Championships in Rotterdam. In 2017 the German men's eight was completely rebuilt after the 2016 Olympics, and Schneider secured the five seat and held it throughout their dominant season campaign, winning gold at the European Championships, two World Rowing Cups and ultimately at the 2017 World Rowing Championships in Sarasota, Florida where the German eight were crowned as world champions. In June 2017 at the World Rowing Cup II in Poznan they set a new world's best time for the eight, taking 0.67 seconds off a 2012 mark that had been set by Canada. The German crew with every man holding the same seat, continued their European and world dominance throughout 2018 winning at three World Rowing Cups, the 2018 European Championships and then defending their world title at the 2018 World Rowing Championships in Plovdiv. There were a handful of changes to the German eight in 2019 but Weißenfeld stayed in the engine room at five for another successful international season which culminated in his third successive world championship title at the 2019 World Rowing Championships in Ottensheim.

Their 2019 performances qualified that boat for Tokyo 2020. By the time of the 2021 selections for those delayed Olympics, Schneider was still in the crew and set to make his Olympic rowing debut. At that Tokyo 2021 Olympic regatta he rowed in the five seat of the German eight to an Olympic silver medal.
