= Jack Hargreaves (rower) =

Australian rower (born 1993)

Jack Hargreaves OAM
Personal information
- Born: 24 July 1993 (age 32) Wellington, New South Wales, Australia
- Home town: Nyngan, New South Wales, Australia
- Education: St Joseph's, Hunters Hill
- Years active: 2007–current
- Height: 196 cm (6 ft 5 in)

Sport
- Sport: Rowing
- Club: Sydney University Boat Club
- Coached by: Mark Prater

Achievements and titles
- National finals: King's Cup 2014-2022
Medal record
Men's rowing
Representing Australia
Olympic Games
Gold medal – first place	2020 Tokyo	Coxless four
World Championships
Gold medal – first place	2017 Sarasota	Coxless four
Gold medal – first place	2018 Plovdiv	Coxless four
Silver medal – second place	2022 Račice	Coxless four

Jack Hargreaves OAM (born 24 July 1993) is an Australian representative rower and a world and an Olympic champion. He won consecutive world championships in the coxless four at the 2017 World Rowing Championships, then successfully defended that title at 2018 Plovdiv. He rowed in the three seat of the Australian men's coxless four to a gold medal victory at the Tokyo Olympics.

== Club and state rowing ==
Raised in Nyngan in country New South Wales, Hargreaves was educated at St Joseph's College Hunters Hill where he took up rowing. His senior club rowing has been from the Sydney University Boat Club.

Hargreaves' first state representation for New South Wales came in 2013 when he was selected in the New South Wales youth eight to contest the Noel F Wilkinson Trophy at the Interstate Regatta within the Australian Rowing Championships. From 2014 to 2023 Hargreaves was selected in the New South Wales men's senior eight to contest the King's Cup at the Interstate Regatta. He crewed those King's Cup victories for New South Wales in 2014, 2017, 2018, 2019, 2022 and 2023.

He has contested national championship titles at the Australian Rowing Championships on a number of occasions. In SUBC colours he placed second in the open men's single scull title in 2018. At the New South Wales State Championships in February 2020 he won the men's elite single sculls title and together with Jack O'Brien, won the men's elite pair. In 2021 with his national training centre crewmates he won the Australian championship title in the coxless four. He won the open men's national single scull title at the 2022 Australian Rowing Championships and contested that same event for a third placing in 2023. At the 2023 Australian Rowing Championships he won the open coxless four national title in an all SUBC crew.

== International representative rowing ==
Hargreaves made his Australian representative debut in the men's eight which raced at the World Rowing Cup I in Sydney in 2013. Later than year he competed in the eight at the 2013 World Rowing U23 Championships in Linz, Austria. The U23 eight finished in overall tenth place. In 2014 he rowed in a coxless pair at the WRC III in Lucerne before contesting the World Rowing U23 Championships in Varese in the pair with Nicholas Wheatley and taking a silver medal. He continued to partner with Wheatley into 2015 and they raced at two World Rowing Cups in Europe, then at 2015 World Rowing U23 Championships in Plovdiv where they won silver before competing at the 2015 World Rowing U23 Championships in Aiguebelette and finishing in overall sixth place.

In 2017 Hargreaves was selected into the Australian men's coxless four with Spencer Turrin and Alexander Hill who'd been medallists in the four at World Championships in 2014 and 2015 respectively and with newcomer Joshua Hicks. They took gold at the World Rowing Cup II in Poznan and then raced in the Australian men's senior eight at the WRC III in Lucerne to a silver medal. At the 2017 World Rowing Championships in Sarasota Florida rowing as a four, they won their heat and semi-final. They flew out of the start in the final, rating at 43 strokes per minute to be clear leaders at the 500m mark. They led at every mark and held off the fast-finishing Italians. Australia had not won a men's coxless four world championship title since the Oarsome Foursome's 1991 win.

The world champion four stayed together into 2018 and started their 2018 international campaign with a gold medal win at the World Rowing Cup II in Linz, Austria. They repeated their 2017 tactic with a blistering rating of 43 from the start and kept up above 40 for the rest of the race. In an Australian selection eight and racing as the Georgina Hope Rinehart National Training Centre, in honour of Rowing Australia patron, Gina Rinehart, Hargreaves won the 2018 Grand Challenge Cup at the Henley Royal Regatta. The fourth Australian men's eight to ever do so. The following week back in the coxless four, Hargreaves won another gold at the World Rowing Cup III in Lucerne. At the 2018 World Rowing Championships in Plovdiv, in the same combination as 2017, the Australian coxless four won their heat, their semi-final and just held off the fast-finishing Italians in the final to retain their world title. Hargreaves, rowing at three won his second world championship gold.

In 2019 Hargreaves was again selected in the Australian men's sweep squad for the international representative season. In an effort to qualify the men's pair for the 2020 Olympics, selectors broke up the world champion four into other boats but left Hargreaves in the four. Rowing with Tim Masters, Nicholas Purnell and Jack O'Brien, Hargreaves took the gold medal in the Australian coxless four at both the World Rowing Cup II in Poznan and at WRC III in Rotterdam. Hargreaves, Hill, Purnell and O'Brien were selected to race Australia's coxless four at the 2019 World Rowing Championships in Linz, Austria. The four were looking for a top eight finish at the 2019 World Championships to qualify for the Tokyo Olympics. They won their heat and semi-final, thereby qualifying the boat for Tokyo 2020. Unexpectedly as race favourites, they finished last in the final for an overall world sixth place.

In Tokyo the coxless four won their heat and progressed straight to the A final where they held a lead from the first 500m, and were being challenged by the British four who lost their steering and control in the final 500m. With Hargreaves' technique and style from the three seat the Australians kept their composure and held off the Romanians in a tight finish, taking the gold in an Olympic best time.

In March 2022 Hargreaves, Turrin, Purnell and Jack O'Brien were selected as the men's four in the Australian squad for the 2022 international season and the 2022 World Rowing Championships. They took gold at the World Rowing Cup II in Poznan in June, won the Stewards Challenge Cup at the Henley Royal Regatta in July and a week later finished second at the WRC III in Lucerne. At the 2022 World Rowing Championships at Racize, he rowed in the Australian coxless four to a silver medal.

With Alex Hill's renewed intention, in March 2023 selectors picked Hargreaves, Turrin, Hill and Purnell as the Australian coxless four for the 2023 international season and world championship preparation. At the Rowing World Cup II in Varese, Italy they raced as Australia's M4- entrant. They made the A final and won the silver medal behind the Great Britain four. At 2023's RWC III in Lucerne, that unchanged four again raced the M4-. They won their heat and semi but again were beaten into second place by Great Britain in the A final. That crew was selected intact as Australia's coxless four for the 2023 World Rowing Championships in Belgrade Serbia. They placed second in their heat. They placed 3rd in the A/B semi-final at which point they qualified an Australian M4- boat for the 2024 Paris Olympics. In the A final the Australian four finished fifth, giving them a fifth place world ranking from the regatta.

== Accolades ==
In the 2022 Australia Day Honours Hargreaves was awarded the Medal of the Order of Australia.
