= Matthew Tarrant =

British rower (born 1990)

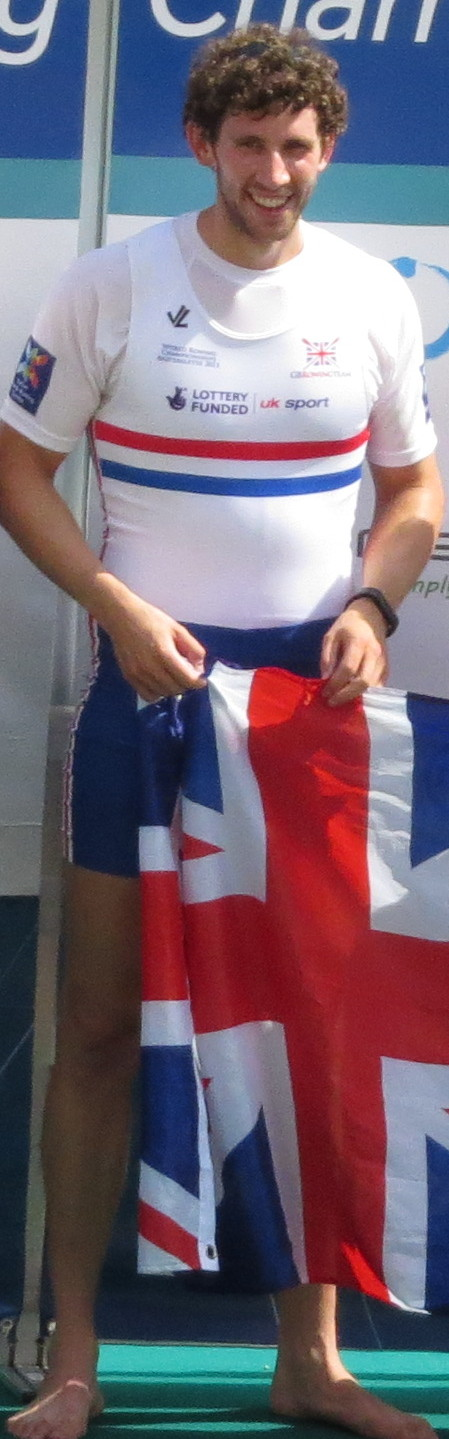

Personal information
- Nationality: British
- Born: 11 July 1990 (age 36)

Sport
- Country: Great Britain
- Sport: Rowing
- Events: Coxed pair, Coxless four, Eight
Medal record
Men's rowing
Representing Great Britain
World Championships
Gold medal – first place	2014 Amsterdam	Eight
Gold medal – first place	2015 Aiguebelette	Coxed pair
Bronze medal – third place	2017 Sarasota	Coxless four
Bronze medal – third place	2018 Plovdiv	Eight
Bronze medal – third place	2019 Ottensheim	Eight
European Championships
Silver medal – second place	2019 Lucerne	Eight
Bronze medal – third place	2014 Belgrade	Eight

Matthew T Tarrant (born 11 July 1990) is a British rower.

== Rowing career ==
Tarrant won a gold medal in the eight at the 2014 World Championships in Bosbaan, Amsterdam. He was part of the British team that topped the medal table at the 2015 World Rowing Championships at Lac d'Aiguebelette in France, where he won a gold medal as part of the coxed pair with Nathaniel Reilly-O'Donnell and Henry Fieldman.

He won a bronze medal at the 2017 World Rowing Championships in Sarasota, Florida, as part of the coxless four. He then won a bronze medal at the 2018 World Rowing Championships in Plovdiv, Bulgaria, as part of the eight with James Rudkin, Alan Sinclair, Tom Ransley, Thomas George, Moe Sbihi, Oliver Wynne-Griffith, Will Satch and Fieldman. He won another bronze medal the following year at the 2019 World Rowing Championships in Ottensheim, Austria as part of the eight with George, Rudkin, Josh Bugajski, Sbihi, Jacob Dawson, Wynne-Griffith, Thomas Ford and Fieldman.
