= Henry Fieldman =

British rower (born 1988)

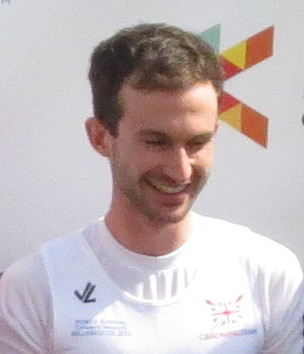
- Fieldman at the 2015 World Rowing Championships

Personal information
- Full name: Henry Jack A. Fieldman
- Nationality: British
- Born: 25 November 1988 (age 37) Hammersmith, England
- Height: 162 cm (5 ft 4 in)

Sport
- Country: Great Britain
- Sport: Rowing
- Events: Women's eight, Men's eight, Men's coxed pair
- Club: Leander Club
Medal record
Rowing
Representing Great Britain
Olympic Games
Bronze medal – third place	2020 Tokyo	Men's eight
Bronze medal – third place	2024 Paris	Women's eight
World Championships
Gold medal – first place	2015 Aiguebelette-le-lac	Men's coxed pair
Gold medal – first place	2016 Rotterdam	Men's coxed pair
Silver medal – second place	2014 Amsterdam	Men's coxed pair
Bronze medal – third place	2018 Plovdiv	Men's eight
Bronze medal – third place	2019 Ottensheim	Men's eight
European Championships
Gold medal – first place	2021 Varese	Men's eight
Gold medal – first place	2023 Bled	Men's eight
Silver medal – second place	2019 Lucerne	Men's eight
Silver medal – second place	2023 Bled	Women's eight
Silver medal – second place	2024 Szeged	Women's eight

Henry Jack A. Fieldman (born 25 November 1988) is a British rowing coxswain. He has been twice a world champion and is a two-time Olympic medalist.

== Rowing career ==
Fieldman competed at the 2014 World Rowing Championships in Bosbaan, Amsterdam, where he won a silver medal steering the coxed pair of Alan Sinclair and Scott Durant. The following year he was part of the British team that topped the medal table at the 2015 World Rowing Championships at Lac d'Aiguebelette in France, where he won a gold medal in the coxed pair with Nathaniel Reilly-O'Donnell and Matthew Tarrant.

In 2016 he coxed Oliver Cook and Callum McBrierty to another gold medal at the 2016 World Rowing Championships.

He won a bronze medal at the 2018 World Rowing Championships in Plovdiv, Bulgaria, in the stern of the British eight with James Rudkin, Alan Sinclair, Tom Ransley, Thomas George, Moe Sbihi, Oliver Wynne-Griffith, Tarrant and Will Satch. The following year he won another bronze medal at the 2019 World Rowing Championships in Ottensheim, Austria in the eight with George, Rudkin, Josh Bugajski, Sbihi, Jacob Dawson, Wynne-Griffith, Tarrant and Thomas Ford.

He coxed the British men's eight that won a bronze medal at the Tokyo Summer Olympics.

In 2021, he won a European gold medal in the eight in Varese, Italy.

In 2022, he won the Grand Challenge Cup (the blue riband event at the Henley Royal Regatta), coxing for the Leander Club.

He won a bronze medal as coxswain for the Great Britain women's eight at the 2024 Summer Olympics, making him the first person to win an Olympic medal in both men’s and women’s events.
