= James Rudkin =

British rower (born 1994)

Personal information
- Full name: James Alexander Rudkin
- Nationality: British
- Born: 7 July 1994 (age 32) Northampton, England
- Height: 1.98 m (6 ft 6 in)

Sport
- Country: Great Britain
- Sport: Rowing
- Event: Eight
- Club: Newcastle University Boat Club
Medal record
Men's rowing
Representing Great Britain
Olympic Games
| Gold medal – first place | 2024 Paris | Eight |
| Bronze medal – third place | 2020 Tokyo | Eight |
World Championships
| Gold medal – first place | 2022 Račice | Eight |
| Gold medal – first place | 2023 Belgrade | Eight |
| Bronze medal – third place | 2018 Plovdiv | Eight |
| Bronze medal – third place | 2019 Ottensheim | Eight |
European Championships
| Gold medal – first place | 2021 Varese | Eight |
| Gold medal – first place | 2022 Oberschleißheim | Eight |
| Gold medal – first place | 2023 Bled | Eight |
| Gold medal – first place | 2024 Szeged | Eight |
| Silver medal – second place | 2019 Lucerne | Eight |

James Alexander Rudkin (born 7 July 1994) is a British national representative rower. He is an Olympic and two-time world champion.

== Club and university rowing ==
Rudkin was raised in Northampton. He was introduced to rowing by his father and joined the Hollowell Scullers club. He attended Stowe School on a sports scholarship and then Newcastle University.

His senior club rowing was from the Newcastle University Boat Club where he was men's captain in 2015.

In 2022, he won the Grand Challenge Cup (the blue riband event at the Henley Royal Regatta) in the seven seat of a composite Leander/Oxford Brookes crew. In 2023 again in Leander Club colours, he was at seven in the Leander/Oxford Brookes eight for another Grand Challenge Cup victory.

== International representative career ==
Rudkin progressed through the underage levels representing for Great Britain. He competed in junior match racing against France in 2010 & 2011 and then at the 2012 Junior World Rowing Championships he was selected in the GB quad scull which finished in overall twelfth place. He then raced in sweep oared crews at U23 World Rowing Championships in 2014, 2015 and 2016 winning a silver medal in the men's four at that 2016 regatta.

Rudkin moved into the senior Great Britain squad in 2017 and held a seat in the GB men's eight consistently from 2017 to 2023. That crew finished in seventh place at the 2017 World Rowing Championships and achieved constant improvement thereafter. Rudkin won a bronze medal at the 2018 World Rowing Championships in Plovdiv, Bulgaria, in the eight with Alan Sinclair, Tom Ransley, Thomas George, Moe Sbihi, Oliver Wynne-Griffith, Matthew Tarrant, Will Satch and Henry Fieldman. He won another bronze medal the following year at the 2019 World Rowing Championships in Ottensheim, Austria in the eight with George, Josh Bugajski, Sbihi, Jacob Dawson, Wynne-Griffith, Tarrant, Thomas Ford and Fieldman. That crew had won silver at the 2019 European Rowing Championships.

In 2021, he won a European gold medal in the eight in Varese, Italy. At that year's delayed 2020 Tokyo Olympics he was again in the seven seat of the Great Britain men's eight. They finished 3rd their heat but proceeded through a repechage to make the Olympic final. In the final they rowed level with the ultimate winner New Zealand at each mark but finished with a bronze medal being pipped for silver in the last 500m by the fast finishing Deutschland-Achter.

Rudkin became a world champion in the seven seat of the British eight at the 2022 World Rowing Championships. He had earlier won gold that season at the 2022 European Rowing Championships. In 2023 Rudkin won a second successive World Championship gold medal in the men's eight at the 2023 World Rowing Championships in Belgrade.

He won a gold medal as part of the Great Britain eight at the 2024 Summer Olympics.
