= Oliver Wynne-Griffith =

British rower (born 1994)

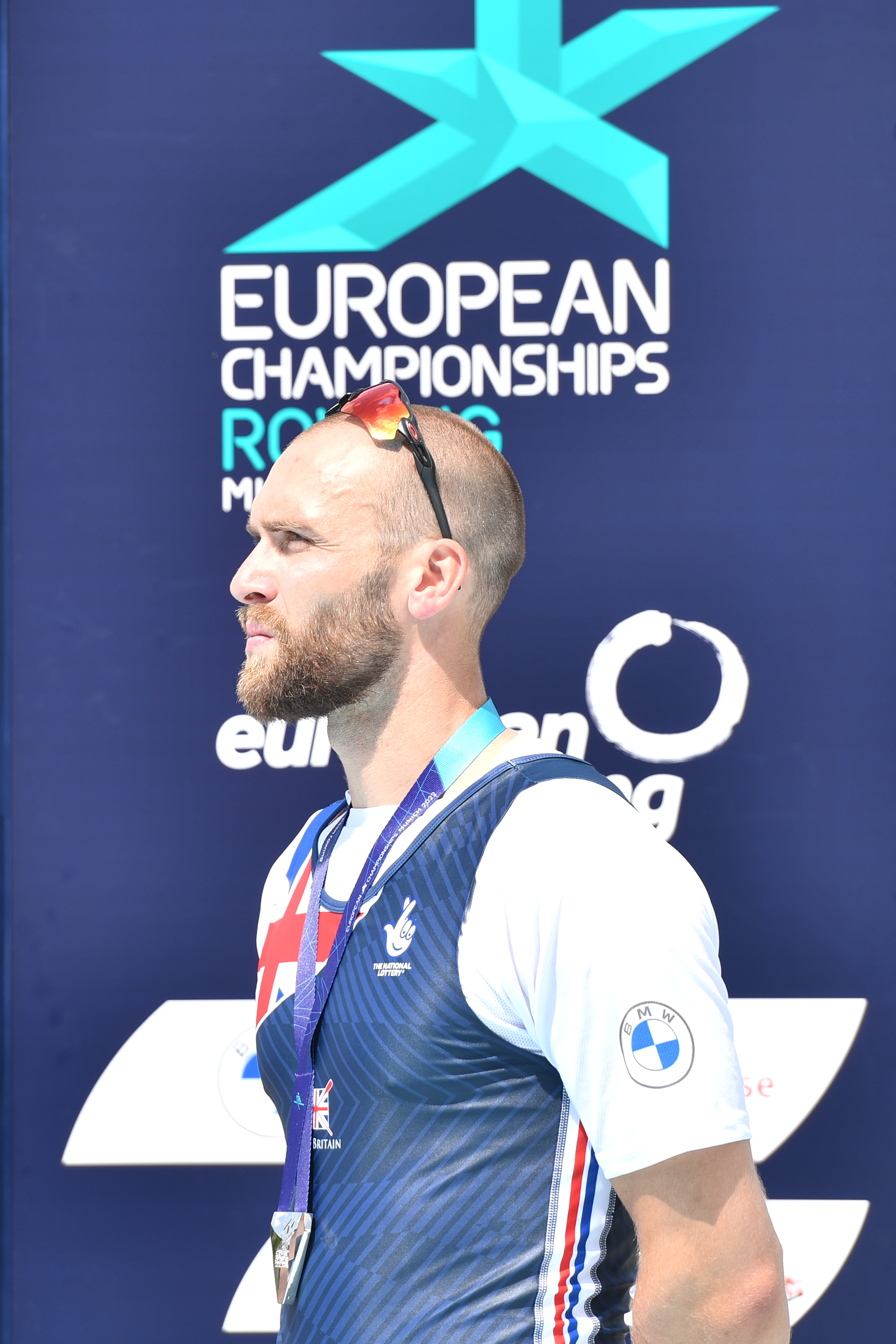
- Wynne-Griffith in 2022

Personal information
- Nationality: British
- Born: 29 May 1994 (age 32) Guildford, England
- Education: Peterhouse, Cambridge
- Height: 1.98 m (6 ft 6 in)

Sport
- Country: Great Britain
- Sport: Rowing
- Event: Eight
- Club: Leander Club
Medal record
Men's rowing
Representing Great Britain
Olympic Games
Silver medal – second place	2024 Paris	Coxless pair
Bronze medal – third place	2020 Tokyo	Eight
World Championships
Silver medal – second place	2023 Belgrade	Coxless pair
Bronze medal – third place	2018 Plovdiv	Eight
Bronze medal – third place	2019 Ottensheim	Eight
Bronze medal – third place	2022 Račice	Coxless pair
European Championships
Gold medal – first place	2021 Varese	Eight
Gold medal – first place	2024 Szeged	Coxless pair
Silver medal – second place	2019 Lucerne	Eight
Silver medal – second place	2022 Oberschleißheim	Coxless pair
Silver medal – second place	2023 Bled	Coxless pair

Oliver Henry Wynne-Griffith (born 29 May 1994) is a British rower.

== Rowing career ==
Wynne-Griffith won a bronze medal at the 2018 World Rowing Championships in Plovdiv, Bulgaria, as part of the eight with James Rudkin, Alan Sinclair, Tom Ransley, Thomas George, Moe Sbihi, Matthew Tarrant, Will Satch and Henry Fieldman. The following year he won another bronze medal at the 2019 World Rowing Championships in Ottensheim, Austria as part of the eight with George, Rudkin, Josh Bugajski, Sbihi, Jacob Dawson, Tarrant Thomas Ford and Fieldman.

He won a silver medal in the eight at the 2019 European Rowing Championships. In 2021, he won a European gold medal in the eight in Varese, Italy.

He was in the seven seat of the Cambridge boat in the 2022 Boat Race.

He switched to the coxless pair, where he teamed up with Tom George and in 2022, won a bronze medal and a silver medal, at the 2022 World and European Championships respectively. The following year in 2023, he repeated the silver success at the 2023 European Rowing Championships and then followed this up with another silver at the 2023 World Rowing Championships in Belgrade, behind the same Swiss pair.

At the 2024 Paris Olympics, Ollie finished 2nd in the men's pair with Tom George, losing to Croatia in the last few strokes.
