= Timothy Masters (rower) =

Australian rower (born 1992)

Tim Masters
Personal information
- Full name: Timothy Masters
- Nationality: Australian
- Born: 2 January 1992 (age 34) East Melbourne, Australia
- Education: Melbourne Grammar School
- Height: 1.95 m (6 ft 5 in)

Sport
- Country: Australia
- Sport: Rowing
- University team: Princeton VIII 2013–2015
- Club: UTS Haberfield Rowing Club

Achievements and titles
- Olympic finals: Tokyo 2020 M8+
- National finals: King's Cup 2016–2018
Medal record
Men's rowing
Representing Australia
World Championships
Silver medal – second place	2018 Plovdiv	Eight
Bronze medal – third place	2023 Belgrade	Eight
U23 World Championships
Silver medal – second place	2012 Trakai	BM4-
Silver medal – second place	2013 Linz	BM4-
Silver medal – second place	2014 Varese	BM8+

Timothy Masters (born 2 January 1992) is an Australian rower. He is a national champion, a representative and silver medallist at World Championships, and a three-time silver medallist at World Rowing U23 Championships. He rowed in the Australian men's eight at the Tokyo 2020 Olympics.

== Club and state rowing ==
Raised in Melbourne, Masters was educated and introduced to rowing at Melbourne Grammar School. His early club rowing was from the Banks Rowing Club in Melbourne. He debuted at state representative level for Victoria in the 2010 youth eight which contested the Noel Wilkinson Trophy at the Interstate Regatta within the 2010 Australian Rowing Championships.

From 2011 to 2015 he attended Princeton University and in the 2013, 2014, 2015 seasons he rowed in the Princeton varsity eight. In 2015 he stroked the Princeton eight to a bronze medal at the Intercollegiate Rowing Association championships.

After university Masters first rowed in the Victorian men's senior eight when they won the 2016 King's Cup at the Interstate Regatta. He rowed at seven in the 2017 Victorian King's Cup crew and he stroked the 2018 eight. Both those crews finished second to New South Wales.

Masters relocated to Canberra during his Australian representative years but races in UTS Haberfield Rowing Club colours at state and national regattas.

== International representative rowing ==
Masters made his Australian representative debut in the U23 eight at the 2011 World Rowing U23 Championships in Amsterdam where that eight finished in seventh place. In 2012 and 2013 he rowed in an Australian coxless four at the World Rowing U23 Championships and both years rowed to a silver medal. That 2012 four raced as an Australian selection crew at the 2012 Henley Royal Regatta and won the Stewards' Challenge Cup.

In 2014 he was back in the U23 Australian eight and that crew also took the silver medal at 2014 World Rowing U23 Championships in Varese.

Masters made his first national senior squad appearance in the Australian men's eight who were unsuccessful in attempting to qualify for the 2016 Rio Olympics at the final FISA qualification regatta. He held his seat in the Australian eight throughout 2017 and 2018. He raced in 2017 in that boat at two World Rowing Cups in Europe before contesting the 2017 World Rowing Championships in Sarasota where the eight missed the A final and placed eighth overall. In 2018 he rowed in the six seat at the World Rowing Cup II in Linz and the WRC III in Lucerne where the Australians took a silver medal in a thrilling finish 0.14 seconds behind Germany. The stage was set for the close competition that played out at the 2018 World Championships in Plovdiv. In their heat the Australian eight finished 5/100ths of a second behind the US and then in the final, Germany dominated and took gold but 2/10ths of a second separated 2nd through to 4th and the Australians took silver, a bowball ahead of Great Britain with the US out of the medals. Masters rowed in the six seat and came home with a silver world championship medal.

In 2019 Masters was again selected in the Australian men's sweep squad for the international representative season. In an effort to qualify the men's pair for the 2020 Olympics, selectors broke up the dual-world champion four into other boats and for the two World Rowing Cups in Europe, Masters was selected at bow in the Australian men's coxless four. Rowing with Jack Hargreaves, Nicholas Purnell and Jack O'Brien, Masters won gold medals at both the WRC II in Poznan and at WRC III in Rotterdam. Masters was then selected to race in the Australian men's eight at the 2019 World Rowing Championships in Linz, Austria. The eight were looking for a top five finish at the 2019 World Championships to qualify for the Tokyo Olympics. The eight placed second in their heat and fourth in the final and qualified for Tokyo 2020. In Tokyo the Australian men's eight placed fourth in their heat, fourth in the repechage and sixth in the Olympic A final. Had they repeated their repechage time of 5:25:06 they would have won the silver medal.

In March 2023 Masters was again selected in the Australian senior men's sweep-oar squad for the 2023 international season. At the Rowing World Cup II in Varese Italy, Masters raced in the Australian men's eight. In the final after a slow start they rowed through most of the field and took second place and a silver medal. At 2023's RWC III in Lucerne, Masters moved from the three to the four seat in the Australian men's eight. In the final they rowed stroke for stroke with their fancied Great Britain rivals but then moved away at the 1000m mark and held on for an upset gold medal victory. For the 2023 World Rowing Championships in Belgrade Serbia, the Australian men's eight was left unchanged and Masters again raced in the four seat. They won their heat powering past the USA eight who had headed them at the 1000m mark. In the A final Australia and Great Britain traded the lead over the first 1000m, but beyond that point the result mirrored that of 2022 with Great Britain exerting dominance by the 1500m, fighting off a fast finishing Dutch eight who took silver and leaving the Australians with the bronze for the second successive year.
