= Simon Keenan =

Australian rower (born 1992)

Personal information
- Born: 8 October 1992 (age 33) Melbourne, Victoria, Australia
- Years active: 2008 - current
- Height: 201 cm (6 ft 7 in)

Sport
- Country: Australia
- Sport: Rowing
- Club: Melbourne Uni Boat Club
- Coached by: Rhett Ayliffe

Achievements and titles
- Olympic finals: Tokyo 2020 M8+
- National finals: King's Cup 2016-18, 2021-22.
Medal record
Men's rowing
Representing Australia
World Championships
Silver medal – second place	2018 Plovdiv	Eight

Simon Keenan (born 8 October 1992) is an Australian representative rower. He is a national champion, a silver medal winner at world championships and is an Olympian. He rowed in the Australian men's eight at the Tokyo 2020 Olympics.

== Early life ==
Keenan is the son of Australian Rules premiership winning footballer Peter Keenan. Simon Keenan was educated at Xavier College where he took up rowing.

== Club, varsity and state rowing ==
Keenan senior club rowing has been from the Melbourne University Boat Club in Melbourne. In 2010 in MUBC colours he won the Fawley Challenge Cup for junior quad sculls at the Henley Royal Regatta. In 2011 racing in Upper Yarra Rowing Club colours he was in a men's eight which won the Thames Challenge Cup at Henley.

He debuted at state representative level for Victoria in the 2011 youth eight which contested and won the Noel Wilkinson Trophy at the Interstate Regatta within the 2011 Australian Rowing Championships. Keenan took a rowing scholarship to Yale University in 2011. He rowed in Yale eights at US collegiate regattas in all four of his years there including a seat in their senior men's first eight in his sophomore year.

Upon his return to Australia he was selected in the Victorian men's senior eight contesting the 2017 King's Cup at the Interstate Regatta. He again rowed in the Victorian King's Cup eights of 2018, 2019 and 2022 placing second to New South Wales on all four occasions. In 2021 he rowed at six in the Victorian men's eight to a King's Cup victory.

At the 2023 Australian Rowing Championships he stroked a MUBC crew to victory in the men's eight national title.

== International representative rowing ==
Keenan made his Australian representative debut in 2013 in an U23 coxed four at the World Rowing U23 Championships in Linz and rowed to a fourth placing. In 2014 he rowed in the four seat of an Australian eight at the World Rowing U23 Championships in Varese who finished second behind New Zealand and took a silver medal.

Keenan made his first national senior squad appearance in the Australian eight in 2017. He raced in that boat at two World Rowing Cups in Europe before contesting the 2017 World Rowing Championships in Sarasota where the eight missed the A final and placed eighth overall. He held his seat in the eight in 2018 rowing at the World Rowing Cup II in Linz and at the WRC III in Lucerne where the Australians took a silver medal in a thrilling finish 0.14 seconds behind Germany. The stage was set for the close competition that played out at the 2018 World Championships in Plovdiv. In their heat the Australian eight finished 5/100ths of a second behind the USA and then in the final, Germany dominated and took gold but 2/10ths of a second separated 2nd through to 4th and the Australians took silver, a bowball ahead of Great Britain with the US out of the medals. Keenan rowed in the four seat and came home with a silver world championship medal.

In 2019 Keenan was again selected in the Australian men's eight for the 2019 international representative season. The eight placed 5th at the World Rowing Cup II in Poznan and 6th at WRC III in Rotterdam. He was then selected in the Australian men's eight for the 2019 World Rowing Championships in Linz, Austria. The eight were looking for a top five finish at the 2019 World Championships to qualify for the Tokyo Olympics. The eight placed second in their heat and fourth in the final and qualified for Tokyo 2020. In Tokyo the Australian men's eight placed fourth in their heat, fourth in the repechage and sixth in the Olympic A final. Had they repeated their repechage time of 5:25:06 they would have won the silver medal.

Keenan was selected into the Australian men's eight squad for the 2022 international season and the 2022 World Rowing Championships. At the World Rowing Cup II in Poznan, Keenan rowed in the Australian men's eight to a silver medal and at the WRC III in Lucerne he raced in the single sculls event.

In March 2023 Keenan was again selected in the Australian senior men's sweep-oar squad for the 2023 international season. At the Rowing World Cup II in Varese Italy, Hicks raced in the Australian men's eight. In the final after a slow start they rowed through most of the field and took second place and a silver medal. At 2023's RWC III in Lucerne, Keenan raced as Australia's 2- entrant with Fergus Hamilton. They won the B final for an overall seventh placing. Keenan and Hamilton were selected to race Australia's coxless pair at 2023 World Rowing Championships in Belgrade, Serbia. They won their heat, progressed through quarters and semis and ultimately placed 2nd in the B final for an overall eight place world ranking. In the process they qualified an Australian men's coxless pair for Paris 2024.
