= Kendall Brodie =

Australian rowing cox (born 1991)

Personal information
- Born: 21 November 1991 (age 34) Paddington, New South Wales, Australia
- Home town: Sydney, Australia
- Education: PLC Sydney
- Height: 167 cm (5 ft 6 in)

Sport
- Country: Australia
- Sport: Rowing
- Club: Sydney Rowing Club
- Coached by: Mark Prater

Achievements and titles
- National finals: Queen's Cup 2013 – 2018; King's Cup 2019 - 2022
Medal record
Women's rowing
Representing Australia
World Championships
Silver medal – second place	2018 Plovdiv	Eight
Bronze medal – third place	2022 Račice	Eight
Bronze medal – third place	2023 Belgrade	Eight

Kendall Brodie (born 21 November 1991) is an Australian national champion and national representative rowing coxswain who won medals at the 2018 and 2022 World Championships. In 2018 she became the first Australian female coxswain to steer a representative Australian male crew under the FISA gender-neutral coxswain selection policy initiated in 2017.

== Club and state rowing ==
Brodie was educated at Presbyterian Ladies' College, Sydney where she took up rowing. Her senior coxing was from Sydney Rowing Club. In 2018 was the vice-captain at Sydney Rowing Club and on the board of directors. She was awarded a scholarship with the New South Wales Institute of Sport. In 2014 she coxed a Sydney Rowing Club four which took silver in the coxed four national title at the Australian Rowing Championships.

She was first selected to represent New South Wales in the women's eight contesting the Queen's Cup in the Interstate Regatta within the 2013 Australian Rowing Championships. For six consecutive years from 2013 to 2018 she coxed New South Wales senior women's eights in the Queen's Cup. In 2019, 2021, 2022 and 2023 she coxed the New South Wales men's senior eight in the King's Cup. Those crews were victorious in 2019, 2022 and 2023.

== International representative rowing ==
In 2017 FISA announced a number of new rule changes, including voting for coxswains to become gender neutral. In 2018 Australian selection processes embraced this new policy resulting in Kendall Brodie being selected to steer the Australian men’s senior eight for the international representative season of 2018. The Australian men's eight with Brodie in the stern started their 2018 international campaign with a fifth placing at the World Rowing Cup II in Linz, Austria. In an Australian selection eight and racing as the Georgina Hope Rinehart National Training Centre, in honour of Rowing Australia patron, Gina Rinehart, Brodie won the 2018 Grand Challenge Cup at the Henley Royal Regatta. The fourth Australian men's eight to ever do so. The following week at the World Rowing Cup III in Lucerne, Brodie steered the Australian eight to silver medal in a thrilling 0.14 second finish behind Germany. The stage was set for the close competition that played out at the 2018 World Championships in Plovdiv. In their heat the Australian eight finished 5/100ths of a second behind the USA and then in the final, Germany dominated and took gold but 2/10ths of a second separated 2nd through to 4th and the Australians took silver, a bowball ahead of Great Britain with the US out of the medals and just another bowball behind. Brodie came home with a silver world championship medal.

In 2019 Kendall was again selected to steer the Australian men's eight for the 2019 international representative season. The eight placed 5th at the World Rowing Cup II in Poznan and 6th at WRC III in Rotterdam. Brodie was then selected to cox the Australian men's eight at the 2019 World Rowing Championships in Linz, Austria. The eight were looking for a top five finish at the 2019 World Championships to qualify for the Tokyo Olympics. The eight placed second in their heat and fourth in the final and qualified for Tokyo 2020. At the delayed 2020 Olympics Brodie's seat in the Australian men's eight was taken by Stuart Sim.

Brodie regained control of the rudder, when selected into the Australian men's eight to prepare for the 2022 international season and the 2022 World Rowing Championships. At both the World Rowing Cup II in Poznan and at the WRC III in Lucerne, Brodie steered the Australian men's eight to silver medal results. At the 2022 World Rowing Championships at Racize, Brodie coxed the crew through a repechage to make the A final where they raced to a third place and a World Championship bronze medal.

In March 2023 Brodie kept her seat in the stern when selected in Australian men's eight for the 2023 international season. At the Rowing World Cup II in Varese Italy, Brodie coxed the Australian men's eight. In the final after a slow start they rowed through most of the field to take second place and a silver medal. At 2023's RWC III in Lucerne, Brodie again steered the Australian men's eight. In the final they rowed stroke for stroke with their fancied Great Britain rivals but then moved away at the 1000m mark and held on for an upset gold medal victory. For the 2023 World Rowing Championships in Belgrade Serbia, the Australian men's eight was left unchanged with Brodie in the stern. They won their heat powering past the USA eight who had headed them at the 1000m mark. In the A final Australia and Great Britain traded the lead over the first 1000m, but beyond that point the result mirrored that of 2022 with Great Britain exerting dominance by the 1500m, fighting off a fast finishing Dutch eight who took silver and leaving the Australians with the bronze for the second successive year.
