= Liam Donald =

Australian rower (born 1995)

Personal information
- Born: 23 January 1995 (age 31)
- Years active: 2008 - current

Sport
- Country: Australia
- Sport: Rowing
- Club: Mercantile Rowing Club

Achievements and titles
- National finals: King's Cup 2017, 2018
Medal record
Men's rowing
Representing Australia
World Championships
| Silver medal – second place | 2018 Plovdiv | Eight |

Liam Donald (born 23 January 1995) is an Australian rower. He is a national champion, a national representative at world championships and was an U23 World Champion.

== Club and state rowing ==
Donald was educated at St Kevin's College, Melbourne where he took up rowing. His senior club rowing is from the Mercantile Rowing Club in Melbourne.

He debuted at state representative level for Victoria in the 2014 youth eight which contested and won the Noel Wilkinson Trophy at the Interstate Regatta within the 2014 Australian Rowing Championships. He first rowed in the Victorian men's senior eight contesting the 2017 King's Cup at the Interstate Regatta. He again rowed in the Victorian King's Cup eights of 2018 and 2019 placing second to New South Wales on all three occasions.

At the 2017 Australian Rowing Championships in Mercantile colours he won the national coxless pair title, rowing with Mosman's Robert Black.

== International representative rowing ==
Donald made his Australian representative debut aged seventeen in 2012 selected in a junior coxless four to contest the 2012 Junior World Rowing Championships in Plovdiv, Bulgaria. That four rowed to a ninth place finish. In 2013 her again rowed in a coxed four at the Junior World Rowing Championships, this time in Trakai where he stroked the four to a seventh place finish.

In 2016 he was selected in an Australian U23 eight for the World Rowing U23 Championships in Rotterdam and finished in eighth place. In 2017 he rowed in the Australian coxless four at the World Rowing U23 Championships in Plovdiv and raced to a gold medal and an U23 world championship

Donald made his first national senior squad appearances in the Australian men's eight in 2018 at the World Rowing Cup II in Linz and at the WRC III in Lucerne where the Australians took a silver medal 0.14 seconds behind Germany. The stage was set for the close competition that played out at the 2018 World Championships in Plovdiv. In their heat the Australian eight finished 5/100ths of a second behind the USA and then in the final, Germany dominated and took gold but 2/10ths of a second separated 2nd through to 4th and the Australians took silver, a bowball ahead of Great Britain with the US out of the medals. Donald rowed in the bow seat and came home with a silver world championship medal.

In 2019 Donald was again selected in the Australian men's eight for the 2019 international representative season. The eight placed 5th at the World Rowing Cup II in Poznan and 6th at WRC III in Rotterdam.
