= Nicholas Purnell =

Australian rower

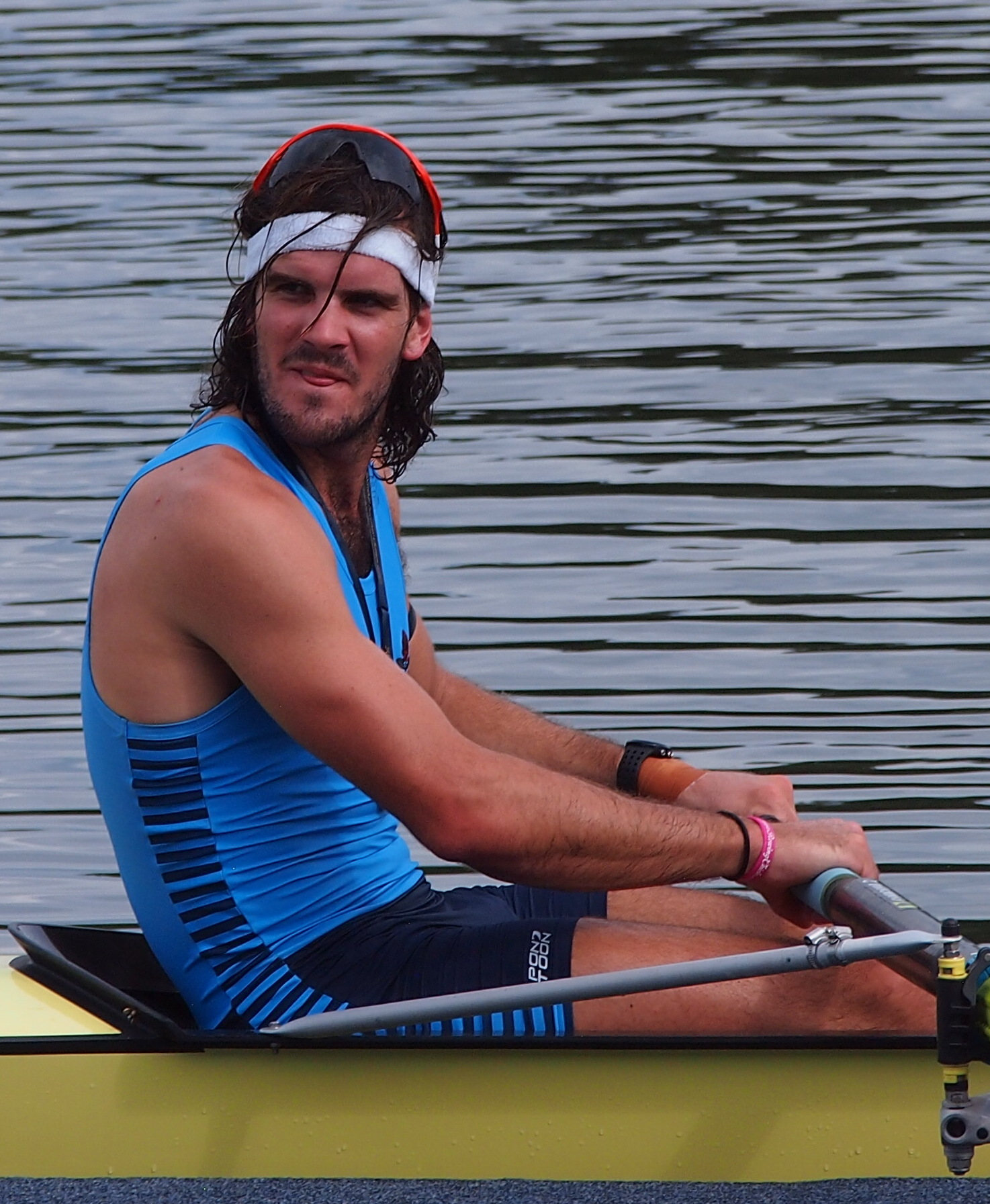
- Purnell after winning the Kings Cup in 2014

Personal information
- Nationality: Australian
- Born: 4 June 1990 (age 36) St Leonards, New South Wales, Australia
- Height: 198 cm (6 ft 6 in)
- Weight: 98 kg (216 lb)

Sport
- Country: Australia
- Sport: Rowing
- Event(s): Men's eight (M8+); Men's coxless four (M4-)
- Club: Sydney University Boat Club
- Coached by: Rhett Ayliffe

Achievements and titles
- Olympic finals: London 2012 M8+ Tokyo 2020 M8+
- National finals: King's Cup 2010–16, 2018-19
Medal record
Men's rowing
Representing Australia
World Championships
Silver medal – second place	2018 Plovdiv	Eight
Bronze medal – third place	2010 Karapiro	Eight
Bronze medal – third place	2011 Bled	Coxless four

Nicholas Purnell (born 4 June 1990) is an Australian representative and dual Olympian rower. He is a national champion, who has competed at seven world championships and in the men's eight event at the 2012 London and the 2020 Tokyo Olympics.

== School, club and state rowing ==
Purnell began his rowing career at Shore School in Sydney. He was a member of their second VIII in 2007 which won their event at the AAGPS Head of the River. In 2008 Purnell was in the seven seat of the Shore first VIII, winning that event at the AAGPS Head of the River. Purnell's senior club rowing has been from the Sydney University Boat Club.

He first made state selection for New South Wales in the 2009 youth eight contesting the Noel Wilkinson Trophy at the Interstate Regatta within the Australian Rowing Championships. In 2010 he was selected in the New South Wales senior men's eight to compete for the King's Cup at the Interstate Regatta. He raced seven consecutive King's Cup races for New South Wales from 2010 to 2016 and won five straight from 2010 to 2014. He rowed again in New South Wales men's senior eights to King's Cup victories in 2018 and 2019 and to a second placing in 2021.

Purnell has a younger brother Alex, who also rows with the Sydney University Boat Club, has won the King's Cup for New South Wales, who rowed in Australian crews at the 2017 and 2018 World Championships and won the Grand Challenge Cup at Henley in 2018. Alex has also been selected as a 2021 Tokyo Olympian and the brothers will become the first to row in the same Australian Olympic team since the Stewart brothers.

== International representative rowing ==
He made his Australian senior team debut at the 2010 World Rowing Championships at Lake Karapiro, New Zealand. Though still eligible for the World Rowing U23 Championships, Purnell won a bronze medal in the senior men's eight. The following year Purnell again won a bronze medal, this time in the Australian men's coxless four at the 2011 World Rowing Championships in Bled, Slovenia.

At the London Olympic Games, Purnell was in the stroke seat of the Australian men's eight which placed sixth in a thrilling final where all boats were overlapping at the finish line.

After the 2012 Olympics, Purnell turned to sculling and represented Australia in the single scull at the 2013 World Rowing Championships in Chungju, South Korea, where he placed 14th. In 2014 Purnell had a second international season in the single scull, improving on the previous year and placing 13th at the 2014 World Rowing Championships in Amsterdam, The Netherlands.

2015 saw Purnell return to the Australian men's eight which placed ninth at the 2015 World Rowing Championships in Aiguebelette, France. In 2016 Purnell was in the Australian men's eight who were unsuccessful in attempting to qualify for the 2016 Rio Olympics at the final FISA qualification regatta.

In 2018 Purnell was back in representative contention and regained a seat in the Australian men's eight. The eight started their 2018 international campaign with a fifth placing at the World Rowing Cup II in Linz, Austria. Three weeks later at the World Rowing Cup III in Lucerne, Purnell rowed in the Australian eight to silver medal in a thrilling 0.14 second finish behind Germany. The stage was set for the close competition that played out at the 2018 World Championships in Plovdiv. In their heat the Australian eight finished 5/100ths of a second behind the US and then in the final, Germany dominated and took gold but 2/10ths of a second separated 2nd through to 4th and the Australians took silver, a bowball ahead of Great Britain with the US out of the medals. Purnell rowing at five came home with a silver world championship medal.

In 2019, Purnell was again selected in the Australian men's sweep squad for the international representative season. In an effort to qualify the men's pair for the 2020 Olympics, selectors broke up the dual-world champion four into other boats and for the two World Rowing Cups in Europe, Purnell rowed at bow in the Australian men's coxless four. Rowing with Jack Hargreaves, Tim Masters and Jack O'Brien, Purnell won gold medals at both the WRC II in Poznan and at WRC III in Rotterdam. Purnell, Hargreaves, Hill, and O'Brien were selected to race Australia's coxless four at the 2019 World Rowing Championships in Linz, Austria. The four were looking for a top eight finish at the 2019 World Championships to qualify for the Tokyo Olympics. They won their heat and semi-final, thereby qualifying the boat for Tokyo 2020. Unexpectedly as race favourites, they finished last in the final for an overall world sixth place.

By the time of national team selections in 2021 for the delayed Tokyo Olympics, Purnell re-gained his seat in the Australian men's heavyweight eight. In Tokyo the Australian men's eight placed fourth in their heat, fourth in the repechage and sixth in the Olympic A final. Had they repeated their repechage time of 5:25:06 they would have won the silver medal.
