= Will Satch =

British rower (born 1989)

William Satch MBE
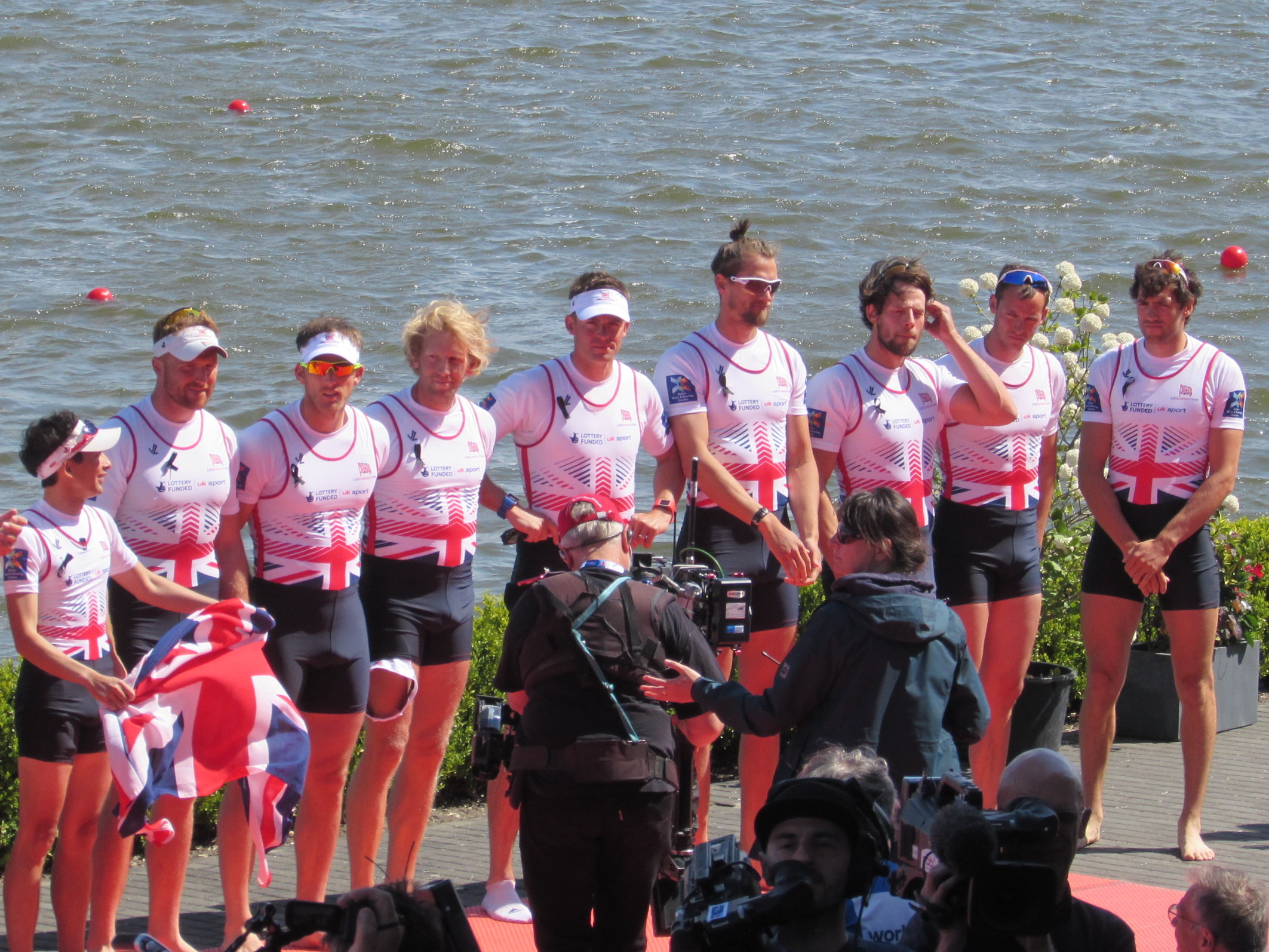
- William Satch (middle) at the 2016 European Rowing Championships

Personal information
- Born: William Spencer Satch; 9 June 1989 (age 37) Henley-on-Thames, Oxfordshire, England
- Height: 196 cm (6 ft 5 in)
Medal record
Men's rowing
Representing Great Britain
Olympic Games
Gold medal – first place	2016 Rio de Janeiro	Eight
Bronze medal – third place	2012 London	Coxless pair
World Championships
Gold medal – first place	2013 Chungju	Eight
Gold medal – first place	2014 Amsterdam	Eight
Gold medal – first place	2015 Aiguebelette	Eight
Bronze medal – third place	2017 Sarasota	Coxless four
Bronze medal – third place	2018 Plovdiv	Eight
European Championships
Silver medal – second place	2015 Poznan	Eight
Bronze medal – third place	2014 Belgrade	Eight
Bronze medal – third place	2016 Brandenburg	Eight

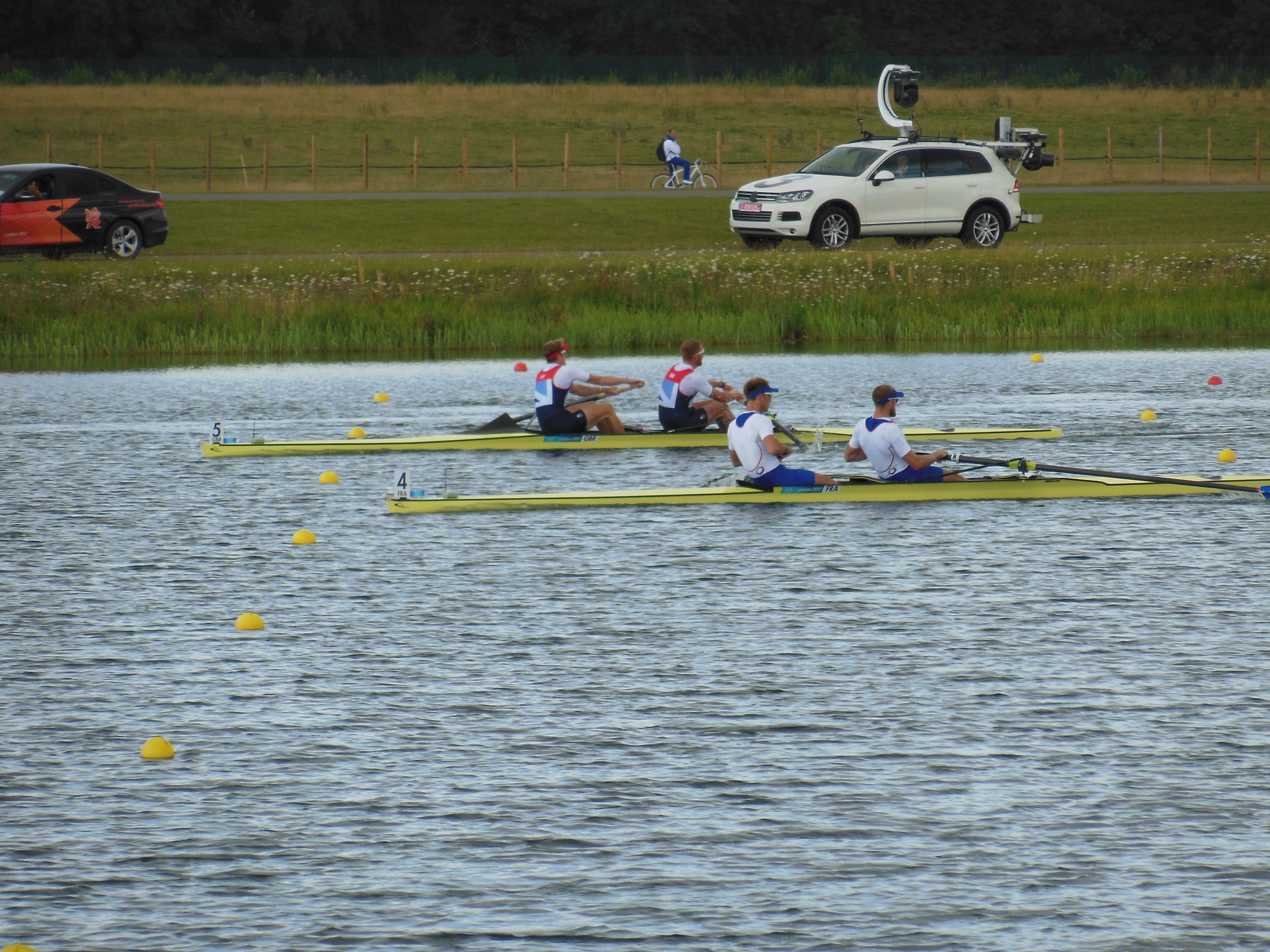
Rowing the final (left boat) of the men's coxless pair at the 2012 Summer Olympics

William Spencer Satch (born 9 June 1989) is a British rower and Olympic gold medallist.

== Rowing career ==
Satch was educated at Shiplake College near Henley-on-Thames in southeast Oxfordshire. His rowing coach was New Zealand gold medallist Shane O'Brien, who was deputy headmaster at Shiplake College. Satch rows for Leander Club in Henley-on-Thames, and was appointed a vice-captain of the club in 2018. Currently he is the Director of Rowing at Eton College.

Satch won the bronze medal, rowing with George Nash in the coxless pair at the 2012 Summer Olympics.

In September 2013 Satch stroked the GB men's eight to the gold medal at the World Rowing Championships in Chungju, Korea and repeated the gold at the World Rowing Championships in Amsterdam in 2014. He was part of the British team (at stroke) that topped the medal table at the 2015 World Rowing Championships at Lac d'Aiguebelette in France, where he won a gold medal as part of the eight that gained a hat-trick of wins over the German Olympic champions. The crew was Matt Gotrel, Constantine Louloudis, Pete Reed, Paul Bennett, Moe Sbihi, Alex Gregory, George Nash and Phelan Hill.

In May 2016, he was part of the GB men's eight which won bronze at the European Championships. Later in 2016, he stroked the British men's eight to a gold medal at the 2016 Summer Olympics in Rio. He won a bronze medal at the 2017 World Rowing Championships in Sarasota, Florida, as part of the coxless four and then won a bronze medal at the 2018 World Rowing Championships in Plovdiv, Bulgaria, as part of the eight with James Rudkin, Alan Sinclair, Tom Ransley, Thomas George, Moe Sbihi, Oliver Wynne-Griffith, Matthew Tarrant and Henry Fieldman.

== Awards ==
Satch was awarded the MBE in the Queen's 2017 New Year Honours list for services to rowing.
