= Alan Sinclair (rower) =

British rower (born 1985)

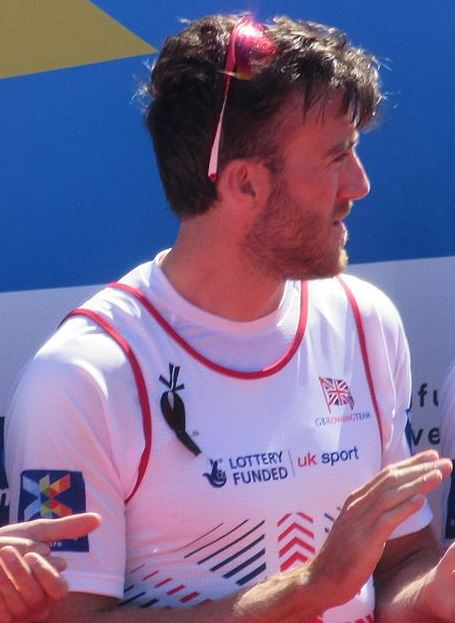

Personal information
- Born: 16 October 1985 (age 40) Inverness, Scotland

Sport
- Club: Leander
Medal record
Men's rowing
Representing Great Britain
World Championships
Silver medal – second place	2014 Amsterdam	Coxed pair
Bronze medal – third place	2015 Aiguebelette	Coxless four
Bronze medal – third place	2018 Plovdiv	Eight
European Championships
Gold medal – first place	2015 Poznań	Coxless four
Silver medal – second place	2016 Brandenburg	Coxless pair

Alan Sinclair (born 16 October 1985) is a retired British international rower.

== Rowing career ==
Sinclair is a member of the Leander Club. He was a member of the Scotland Team at the 2010 Commonwealth Rowing Championships, in Welland, Canada.

He competed at the 2014 World Rowing Championships in Bosbaan, Amsterdam, where he won a silver medal as part of the coxed pair with Scott Durant and Henry Fieldman. The following year he competed in the 2015 European Rowing Championships in Poznań winning a gold medal. He was part of the British team that topped the medal table at the 2015 World Rowing Championships at Lac d'Aiguebelette in France, where he won a bronze medal as part of the coxless four with Scott Durant, Tom Ransley and Stewart Innes. He also competed in the men's coxless pair event at the 2016 Summer Olympics finishing fourth in the Final.

He won a bronze medal at the 2018 World Rowing Championships in Plovdiv, Bulgaria, as part of the eight with James Rudkin, Tom Ransley, Thomas George, Moe Sbihi, Oliver Wynne-Griffith, Matthew Tarrant, Will Satch and Henry Fieldman.

In May 2021 he announced his retirement from international rowing.

In June 2021, Sinclair was announced as Director of Rowing at the University of St Andrews.

Sinclair was the Match Director for the inaugural Home International Rowing Beach Sprints in August 2022.

== Awards ==
He was the winner of International Rower of the Year at the 2014 Scottish Rowing Annual Awards.
