= Bue (surname) =

Bue is a surname. Notable people with the surname include:

- Bjørn Bue (1934–1997), Norwegian Lutheran missionary and bishop
- Papa Bue (1930–2011), Danish trombonist and bandleader
- Tiril Bue (born 1993), Norwegian sailor

== See also ==
- Lo Bue
