= Giorgia Lo Bue =

Italian rower

Personal information
- Born: 20 February 1994 (age 32)
- Height: 165 cm (5 ft 5 in)
- Weight: 59 kg (130 lb)

Sport
- Sport: Rowing
- Club: Palermo SC
Medal record
Women's rowing
Representing Italy
World Rowing Championships
Gold medal – first place	2018 Plovdiv	LW4x

Giorgia Lo Bue (born 20 February 1994) is an Italian lightweight rower. She competes with her sister Serena in the lightweight pair event, and at the 2018 World Rowing Championships in Plovdiv, Bulgaria, they became world champions.
