= Jakub Buczek =

Canadian rower (born 1993)

Personal information
- Born: October 10, 1993 (age 32) Kitchener, Ontario
- Height: 193 cm (6 ft 4 in)
- Weight: 85 kg (187 lb)

Sport
- Country: Canada
- Sport: Rowing

Jakub Buczek (born October 10, 1993) is a Canadian rower. He graduated from Columbia University in 2016.

== Career ==
At both the 2018 World Rowing Championships and 2019 World Rowing Championships, Buczek was part of the men's eights boat, finishing in eighth place both years.

In May 2021, Buczek competed in the men's fours event at the Final Olympic qualification tournament, finishing in second place and qualifying for the 2020 Summer Olympics. In June 2021, Buczek was named to Canada's 2020 Olympic team.
