= Serena Lo Bue =

Italian rower

Personal information
- Born: 4 August 1995 (age 30)
- Height: 168 cm (5 ft 6 in)
- Weight: 59 kg (130 lb)

Sport
- Sport: Rowing
- Club: Palermo SC
Medal record
Women's rowing
Representing Italy
World Rowing Championships
Gold medal – first place	2018 Plovdiv	LW4x

Serena Lo Bue (born 4 August 1995) is an Italian lightweight rower. She competes with her sister Giorgia in the lightweight pair event, and at the 2018 World Rowing Championships in Plovdiv, Bulgaria, they became world champions.
