= Shaun Kirkham =

New Zealand rower (born 1992)

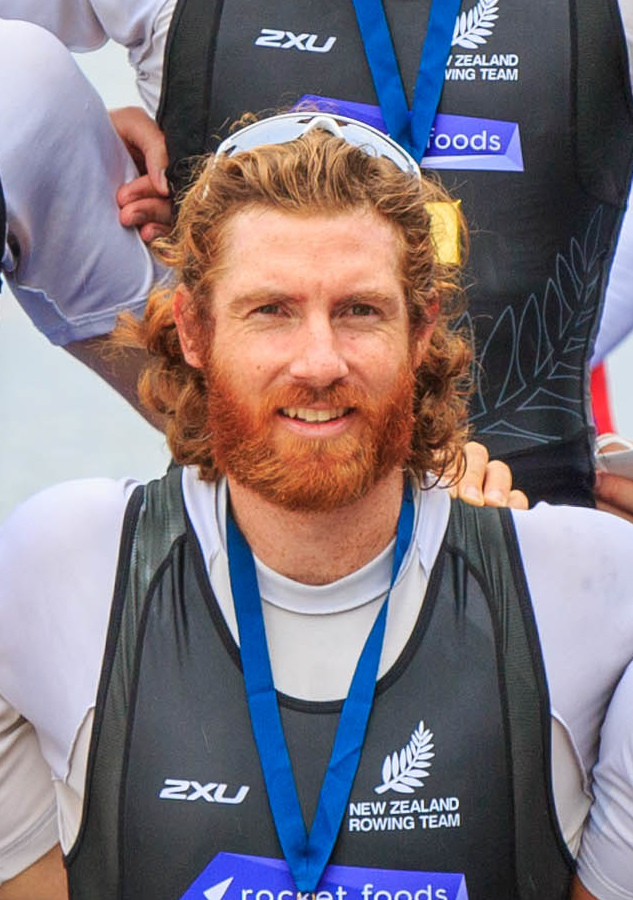
- Kirkham in 2021

Personal information
- Nationality: New Zealand
- Born: 24 July 1992 (age 34) Hamilton, New Zealand
- Height: 190 cm (6 ft 3 in)
- Weight: 84 kg (185 lb)
Medal record
Men's rowing
Representing New Zealand
Olympic Games
Gold medal – first place	2020 Tokyo	Eight

Shaun Kirkham (born 24 July 1992) is a New Zealand rower. He came fourth at the 2015 World Rowing Championships with the men's eight, qualifying the boat for the 2016 Olympics. He came sixth with his team at the eights competition in Rio de Janeiro. He won an Olympic gold medal in the men's eights event at the 2020 Olympics.

Outside of rowing, Kirkham is involved in digital marketing and web services through his company, SK Digital, based in New Zealand.
