= 2018 World Rowing Championships =

International rowing event

- Venue: Plovdiv Regatta Venue
- Location: Plovdiv, Bulgaria
- Dates: 9–16 September

The 2018 World Rowing Championships were the World Rowing Championships held at the regatta course in Plovdiv, Bulgaria. The event was held from 9 to 16 September. Events held were men and women's open class, lightweight class, and para-rowing.

Prior FISA regattas that had been held in Plovdiv include the 1999 and 2012 World Rowing Junior Championships, and the 2011 European Rowing Championships.

The 2018 World Rowing Championships were the first world rowing championships where the number of men’s and women’s events was equal. The world governing body made that decision in 2017.

== Host selection ==
During 2013, Plovdiv and Sarasota, Florida both applied to host the 2017 World Rowing Championships. In April 2013, a committee of International Rowing Federation (FISA) officials visited the city in Florida and they went to Plovdiv the following month. It was then noted that Plovdiv had hosted the 2012 World Rowing Championships and that the bid documentation for 2017 had not been finalised. Before the next FISA congress, the bid from Plovdiv was changed to apply for the 2018 hosting rights. At the FISA congress held on 2 September 2013, hosting rights were assigned by unanimous decision for World Rowing Championships to Sarasota for 2017, Plovdiv for 2018, and Plovdiv for the 2015 World Rowing U23 Championships.

== Medal summary ==
=== Rowing ===
Rank	Nation	Gold	Silver	Bronze	Total
1	Italy	3	4	0	7
2	Germany	3	1	1	5
3	United States	2	2	3	7
4	France	2	0	1	3
5	Ireland	2	0	0	2
6	Australia	1	3	1	5
7	Canada	1	1	0	2
7	Romania	1	1	0	2
9	Lithuania	1	0	1	2
10	China	1	0	0	1
10	Croatia	1	0	0	1
10	Norway	1	0	0	1
10	Poland	1	0	0	1
14	Switzerland	0	3	0	3
15	New Zealand	0	2	1	3
16	Czech Republic	0	1	0	1
16	Denmark	0	1	0	1
16	Greece	0	1	0	1
19	Great Britain	0	0	3	3
20	Netherlands	0	0	2	2
21	Austria	0	0	1	1
21	Belgium	0	0	1	1
21	Russia	0	0	1	1
21	Spain	0	0	1	1
21	Turkey	0	0	1	1
21	Ukraine	0	0	1	1
27	Brazil	0	0	0	0
Totals (27 entries)		20	20	19	59

=== Para rowing ===
Rank	Nation	Gold	Silver	Bronze	Total
1	Netherlands	2	1	0	3
2	United States	1	1	1	3
3	Australia	1	1	0	2
3	Canada	1	1	0	2
5	France	1	0	2	3
6	Brazil	1	0	0	1
6	Great Britain	1	0	0	1
6	Norway	1	0	0	1
9	Poland	0	1	1	2
9	Ukraine	0	1	1	2
11	Austria	0	1	0	1
11	Israel	0	1	0	1
13	Russia	0	0	2	2
14	Italy	0	0	1	1
Totals (14 entries)		9	8	8	25

=== Men's events ===
Non-Olympic/Paralympic classes

Event	Gold		Silver		Bronze	
Openweight events
M1x	Kjetil Borch; Norway	6:38.31	Ondřej Synek; Czech Republic	6:39.90	Mindaugas Griškonis; Lithuania	6:42.90
M2x	France; Hugo Boucheron; Matthieu Androdias	6:05.16	Switzerland; Barnabé Delarze; Roman Röösli	6:06.49	New Zealand; John Storey; Chris Harris	6:06.71
M4x	Italy; Filippo Mondelli; Andrea Panizza; Luca Rambaldi; Giacomo Gentili	5:35.31	Australia; Caleb Antill; Campbell Watts; Alexander Purnell; David Watts	5:36.51	Ukraine; Dmytro Mikhay; Serhiy Hryn; Oleksandr Nadtoka; Ivan Dovhodko	5:37.28
M2−	Croatia; Martin Sinković; Valent Sinković	6:14.96	Romania; Marius Cozmiuc; Ciprian Tudosă	6:16.90	France; Valentin Onfroy; Théophile Onfroy	6:17.51
M4−	Australia; Joshua Hicks; Spencer Turrin; Jack Hargreaves; Alexander Hill	5:44.74	Italy; Matteo Castaldo; Bruno Rosetti; Matteo Lodo; Marco Di Costanzo	5:44.99	Great Britain; Thomas Ford; Jacob Dawson; Adam Neill; James Johnston	5:46.46
M8+	Germany; Johannes Weißenfeld; Felix Wimberger; Max Planer; Torben Johannesen; Jakob Schneider; Malte Jakschik; Richard Schmidt; Hannes Ocik; Martin Sauer	5:24.31	Australia; Liam Donald; Robert Black; Angus Moore; Simon Keenan; Nicholas Purnell; Timothy Masters; Josh Booth; Angus Widdicombe; Kendall Brodie	5:26.11	Great Britain; James Rudkin; Alan Sinclair; Tom Ransley; Thomas George; Moe Sbihi; Oliver Wynne-Griffith; Matthew Tarrant; Will Satch; Henry Fieldman	5:26.14
Lightweight events
LM1x	Jason Osborne; Germany	6:56.36	Michael Schmid; Switzerland	6:58.34	Andrew Campbell; United States	7:00.04
LM2x	Ireland; Gary O'Donovan; Paul O'Donovan	6:06.81	Italy; Stefano Oppo; Pietro Ruta	6:08.31	Belgium; Tim Brys; Niels Van Zandweghe	6:11.25
LM4x	Germany; Joachim Agne; Max Röger; Florian Roller; Moritz Moos	5:51.21	Italy; Catello Amarante; Paolo Di Girolamo; Andrea Micheletti; Matteo Mulas	5:52.85	Turkey; Mert Kartal; Bayram Sönmez; Fatih Ünsal; Enes Kuşku	5:53.95
LM2−	Italy; Giuseppe Di Mare; Alfonso Scalzone	6:38.55	Greece; Antonios Papakonstantinou; Ioannis Marokos	6:41.48	United States; David Smith; Thomas Foster	6:56.99

=== Women's events ===
Event	Gold		Silver		Bronze	
Openweight events
W1x	Sanita Pušpure; Ireland	7:20.12	Jeannine Gmelin; Switzerland	7:25.93	Magdalena Lobnig; Austria	7:29.51
W2x	Lithuania; Milda Valčiukaitė; Ieva Adomavičiūtė	6:44.15	New Zealand; Brooke Donoghue; Olivia Loe	6:46.28	United States; Meghan O'Leary; Ellen Tomek	6:47.75
W4x	Poland; Agnieszka Kobus; Marta Wieliczko; Maria Springwald; Katarzyna Zillmann	6:08.96	Germany; Marie-Cathérine Arnold; Carlotta Nwajide; Franziska Kampmann; Frieda Hämmerling	6:11.42	Netherlands; Olivia van Rooijen; Karolien Florijn; Sophie Souwer; Nicole Beukers	6:11.79
W2−	Canada; Caileigh Filmer; Hillary Janssens	6:50.67	New Zealand; Grace Prendergast; Kerri Gowler	6:52.96	Spain; Anna Boada; Aina Cid	7:04.60
W4−	United States; Madeleine Wanamaker; Erin Boxberger; Molly Bruggeman; Erin Reelick	6:25.57	Australia; Lucy Stephan; Katrina Werry; Sarah Hawe; Molly Goodman	6:27.09	Russia; Ekaterina Sevostianova; Anastasia Tikhanova; Ekaterina Potapova; Elena Oriabinskaia	6:27.36
W8+	United States; Kristine O'Brien; Felice Mueller; Victoria Opitz; Gia Doonan; Dana Moffat; Tracy Eisser; Emily Regan; Olivia Coffey; Katelin Guregian	6:00.97	Canada; Lisa Roman; Stephanie Grauer; Madison Mailey; Susanne Grainger; Christine Roper; Sydney Payne; Jennifer Martins; Rebecca Zimmerman; Kristen Kit	6:03.05	Australia; Leah Saunders; Georgina Gotch; Rosemary Popa; Georgina Rowe; Annabelle McIntyre; Ciona Wilson; Jacinta Edmunds; Emma Fessey; James Rook	6:03.06
Lightweight events
LW1x	Laura Tarantola; France	7:51.79	Clara Guerra; Italy	7:51.96	Imogen Grant; Great Britain	7:52.61
LW2x	Romania; Ionela-Livia Lehaci; Gianina Beleagă	6:50.71	United States; Emily Schmieg; Mary Jones	6:52.30	Netherlands; Marieke Keijser; Ilse Paulis	6:52.56
LW4x	China; Wu Qiang; Liang Guoru; Chen Fang; Pan Dandan	6:28.32	Denmark; Trine Toft Andersen; Aja Runge Holmegaard; Juliane Rasmussen; Mathilde Persson	6:33.33	Germany; Fini Sturm; Caroline Meyer; Ladina Meier; Anja Noske	6:34.25
LW2−	Italy; Serena Lo Bue; Giorgia Lo Bue	7:30.84	United States; Jennifer Sager; Jillian Zieff	7:45.50	not awarded as only 2 boats competed	

=== Para ===
==== Men ====
Event	Gold		Silver		Bronze	
Para-rowing events
PR1M1x	Erik Horrie; Australia	9:16.90	Roman Polianskyi; Ukraine	9:17.36	Alexey Chuvashev; Russia	9:35.33
PR2M1x	Corne de Koning; Netherlands	8:35.89	Jeremy Hall; Canada	8:42.46	Daniele Stefanoni; Italy	8:52.08
PR3M2−	Canada; Kyle Fredrickson; Andrew Todd	7:12.82	Australia; James Talbot; Jed Altschwager	7:23.96	France; Jérôme Pailler; Laurent Viala	7:29.08

==== Women ====
Event	Gold		Silver		Bronze	
Para-rowing events
PR1W1x	Norway; Birgit Skarstein	10:13.63	Israel; Moran Samuel	11:02.06	United States; Hallie Smith	11:17.56
PR2W1x	Perle Bouge; France	9:39.73	Annika van der Meer; Netherlands	9:45.52	Jolanta Majka; Poland	9:58.52
PR3W2−	United States; Danielle Hansen; Jaclyn Smith	7:39.30	not awarded as only 1 boat competed			

==== Mixed pararowing events ====
Event	Gold		Silver		Bronze	
PR2Mix2x	Netherlands; Annika van der Meer; Corné de Koning	8:07.92	Poland; Michał Gadowski; Jolanta Majka	8:12.60	Ukraine; Svitlana Bohuslavska; Iaroslav Koiuda	8:20.61
PR3Mix2x	Brazil; Diana Barcelos; Jairo Klug	7:30.82	Austria; Johanna Beyer; David Erkinger	7:42.68	Russia; Evgenii Borisov; Valentina Zhagot	7:49.93
PR3Mix4+	Great Britain; Ellen Buttrick; Grace Clough; Oliver Stanhope; Daniel Brown; Erin Wysocki-Jones (c)	7:00.36	United States; Alexandra Reilly; Michael Varro; Charley Nordin; Danielle Hansen; Jennifer Sichel (c)	7:02.13	France; Élodie Lorandi; Guylaine Marchand; Rémy Taranto; Antoine Jesel; Robin Le Barreau (c)	7:04.93

=== Event codes ===
	Single sculls	Double sculls	Quadruple sculls	Coxless pair	Coxless four	Coxed pair	Coxed four	Eight
Men's	M1x	M2x	M4x	M2−	M4−			M8+
Lightweight men's	LM1x	LM2x	LM4x	LM2−				
PR1 men's	PR1M1x							
PR2 men's	PR2M1x							
PR3 men's				PR3M2−				
Women's	W1x	W2x	W4x	W2−	W4−			W8+
Lightweight women's	LW1x	LW2x	LW4x	LW2−				
PR1 women's	PR1W1x							
PR2 women's	PR2W1x							
PR3 women's				PR3W2−				
PR2 mixed		PR2Mix2x						
PR3 mixed		PR3Mix2x					PR3Mix4+	

Para-rowing classification — PR1: arms & shoulders, PR2: trunk & arms, PR3: legs, trunk, arms
