= World Rowing Cup =

International rowing competition

The World Rowing Cup is an international rowing competition organized by FISA (the International Rowing Federation). It began in 1997 and comprises three regattas (apart from in 2001 when there were four) held throughout early summer. In each event points are awarded to the top seven finishing boats and an overall winner determined after the last world cup regatta each year. During the regattas the current leader in each event must wear yellow bibs. The World Rowing Cup has only been staged outside Europe on 3 occasions, in 2001 Princeton and in both 2013 and 2014 Sydney.

== World Cup in single scullers (1990–1995) ==
From 1990 to 1995, the World Rowing Cup was a competition for single scullers. At three to six international regattas during one season, points for a total rating and cash prizes could be won. The World Rowing Federation wanted to better market its sport and increase sponsorship income through improved TV-presence. These goals were missed, which ultimately led to the termination of this form of the World Cup after the 1995 season.

Season	Venues	Overall winner (women)	Overall winner (men)
1990	(United States) Mission Bay, San Diego (7 April) (West Germany) Mühlauhafen, Mannheim (13 May) (Norway) Årungen, Ås (3 June) (Netherlands) Bosbaan, Amsterdam (1 July) (Switzerland) Rotsee, Lucerne (15 July)	Titie Jordache; West Germany	Jüri Jaanson; Estonia
1991	(Italy) Lago di Piediluco (10 April) (Germany) Regattabahn Duisburg, Duisburg (26 May) (Sweden) Hjälmsjön, Örkelljunga Municipality (2 June) (Netherlands) Bosbaan, Amsterdam (29 June) (Switzerland) Rotsee, Lucerne (14 July)	Silken Laumann; Canada	Václav Chalupa; Czechoslovakia
1992	(United States) Mission Bay, San Diego (5 April) (Germany) Fühlinger See, Cologne (3 May) (Denmark) Lake Bagsværd, Copenhagen (31 May) (Switzerland) Rotsee, Lucerne (14 June)	Beate Schramm; Germany	Thomas Lange; Germany
1993	(Australia) Yarra River, Melbourne (28 February); Virgilio Uribe Rowing and Canoeing Course, Mexico City (28 March) (Germany) Regattabahn Duisburg, Duisburg (23 May) (Finland) Kaukajärvi, Tampere (6 June) (United Kingdom) River Thames, Henley-on-Thames (4 July) (Switzerland) Rotsee, Lucerne (11 July)	Annelies Bredael; Belgium	Václav Chalupa; Czech Republic
1994	(Germany) Regattabahn Duisburg, Duisburg (22 May) (United Kingdom) River Thames, Henley-on-Thames (3 July) (Switzerland) Rotsee, Lucerne (17 July)	Marnie McBean; Canada	Xeno Müller; Switzerland
1995	(Belgium) Hazewinkel, Heindonk (4 June) (France) Vaires-sur-Marne Nautical Stadium, Paris (18 June) (United Kingdom) River Thames, Henley-on-Thames (2 July) (Switzerland) Rotsee, Lucerne (9 July)	Trine Hansen; Denmark	Jüri Jaanson; Estonia

== Editions and stages (since 1997) ==
#	Year	Stage 1	Stage 2	Stage 3	Stage 4	Events	Overall winner
1	1997	(Germany) Oberschleißheim	(France) Paris	(Switzerland) Lucerne	-	-	Germany
2	1998	(Germany) Oberschleißheim	(Belgium) Heindonk	(Switzerland) Lucerne	-	-	Germany
3	1999	(Belgium) Heindonk	(Austria) Vienna	(Switzerland) Lucerne	-	-	Germany
4	2000	(Germany) Oberschleißheim	(Austria) Vienna	(Switzerland) Lucerne	-	-	Germany
5	2001	(United States) Princeton	(Spain) Seville	(Austria) Vienna	(Germany) Oberschleißheim	-	Germany
6	2002	(Belgium) Heindonk	(Switzerland) Lucerne	(Germany) Oberschleißheim	-	-	Germany
7	2003	(Italy) Milan	(Germany) Oberschleißheim	(Switzerland) Lucerne	-	-	Germany
8	2004	(Poland) Poznań	(Germany) Oberschleißheim	(Switzerland) Lucerne	-	-	Germany
9	2005	(United Kingdom) Dorney	(Germany) Oberschleißheim	(Switzerland) Lucerne	-	-	Germany
10	2006	(Germany) Oberschleißheim	(Poland) Poznań	(Switzerland) Lucerne	-	-	Germany
11	2007	(Austria) Ottensheim	(Netherlands) Amsterdam	(Switzerland) Lucerne	-	-	(United Kingdom) Great Britain
12	2008	(Germany) Oberschleißheim	(Switzerland) Lucerne	(Poland) Poznań	-	-	(United Kingdom) Great Britain
13	2009	(Spain) Banyoles	(Germany) Oberschleißheim	(Switzerland) Lucerne	-	-	(United Kingdom) Great Britain
14	2010	(Slovenia) Bled	(Germany) Oberschleißheim	(Switzerland) Lucerne	-	-	(United Kingdom) Great Britain
15	2011	(Germany) Oberschleißheim	(Germany) Hamburg	(Switzerland) Lucerne	-	-	Germany
16	2012	(Serbia) Belgrade	(Switzerland) Lucerne	(Germany) Oberschleißheim	-	-	(United Kingdom) Great Britain
17	2013	(Australia) Sydney	(United Kingdom) Dorney	(Switzerland) Lucerne	-	-	(United Kingdom) Great Britain
18	2014	(Australia) Sydney	(France) Aiguebelette-le-Lac	(Switzerland) Lucerne	-	-	New Zealand
19	2015	(Slovenia) Bled	(Italy) Varese	(Switzerland) Lucerne	-	-	New Zealand
20	2016	(Italy) Varese	(Switzerland) Lucerne	(Poland) Poznań	-	-	New Zealand
21	2017	(Serbia) Belgrade	(Poland) Poznań	(Switzerland) Lucerne	-	-	(United Kingdom) Great Britain
22	2018	(Serbia) Belgrade	(Austria) Ottensheim	(Switzerland) Lucerne	-	-	Germany
23	2019	(Bulgaria) Plovdiv	(Poland) Poznań	(Netherlands) Rotterdam	-	-	Australia
24	2020	(Italy) Sabaudia	(Italy) Varese	(Switzerland) Lucerne	-	-	2020 World Cup cancelled
25	2021	(Croatia) Zagreb	(Switzerland) Lucerne	(Italy) Sabaudia	-	-	Germany
26	2022	(Serbia) Belgrade	(Poland) Poznań	(Switzerland) Lucerne	-	-	Netherlands
27	2023	(Croatia) Zagreb	(Italy) Varese	(Switzerland) Lucerne	-	-	(United Kingdom) Great Britain
28	2024	(Italy) Varese	(Switzerland) Lucerne	(Poland) Poznań	-	-	Netherlands
29	2025	(Italy) Varese	(Switzerland) Lucerne	-	-	-	(United Kingdom) Great Britain
30	2026	(Spain) Seville	(Bulgaria) Plovdiv	(Switzerland) Lucerne	-	-	(United States) USA

== Format ==
The World Rowing Cup is an annual series of three regattas that act as a lead-up to the World Rowing Championships. Racing at the World Rowing Cup includes the 14 Olympic boat classes and a selection of International boat classes. Para-rowing is contested at some World Cups. Each Olympic boat class earns points based on the finishing order. The highest placing boat from a country is awarded the following points:

1st = 8 points, 2nd = 6 points, 3rd = 5 points, 4th = 4 points, 5th = 3 points, 6th = 2 points, 7th = 1 point
