= Ottensheim =

- Municipality
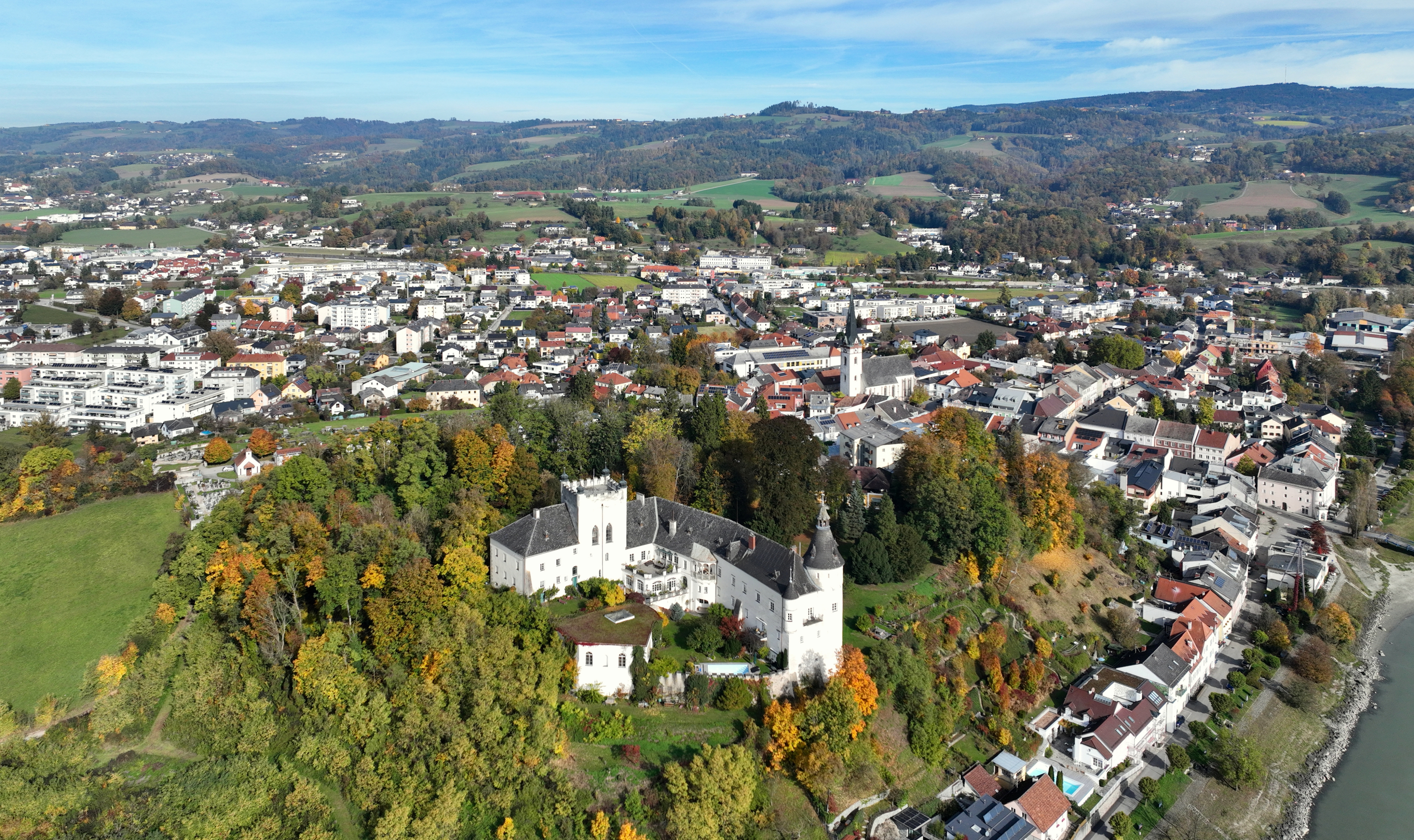

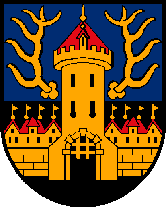
- Coat of arms

- Location within Austria
- Coordinates: 48°20′00″N 14°10′37″E
- Country: Austria
- State: Upper Austria
- District: Urfahr-Umgebung

Government
  - Mayor: Franz Füreder (Austrian People's Party (ÖVP))

Area
  - Total: 11.81 km^{2} (4.56 sq mi)
- Elevation: 270 m (890 ft)

Population (2018-01-01)
  - Total: 4,721
  - Density: 399.7/km^{2} (1,035/sq mi)
- Time zone: UTC+1 (CET)
  - Summer (DST): UTC+2 (CEST)
- Postal code: 4100
- Area code: 07234
- Vehicle registration: UU
- Website: www.ottensheim. ooe.gv.at

Ottensheim is a municipality in the district of Urfahr-Umgebung in the Austrian state of Upper Austria. At its rowing venue, Regattastrecke Ottensheim, it has hosted numerous international rowing competitions, including various World Championships, World U23 Championships, World Junior Championships, and World Cups.

== History ==
First settlements in this area date from about 4000 BC. The first mention of the settlement in a document dates from 1148 AD. In 1228 AD, Ottensheim received the market right – as third town in Upper Austria, after Linz (1210) and Enns (1212). In 1527, the Habsburg-Monarch Ferdinand I endowed the town and the castle to his chancellor Niklas Rabenhaupt von Suche, who expanded the castle. The coat of arms of Ottensheim dates from this time.

Ottensheim has existed as a municipality since 1848. At this time and until 1893 the now self-contended municipality Puchenau also belonged to Ottensheim. In 1871 the first ferry over the Danube was installed. It was destroyed by an ice jam eight years later, and rebuilt in 1882. In 1964 the now still working ferry boat was built. Every year since the 1990s an alternative music festival for about 2,000 people takes place on the Rodl park near the Danube river, the Open Air Ottensheim, where local and international rock, hip-hop and experimental music acts take place.

Most residents work in the closest city, Linz. Ottensheim has many parks and sporting facilities as well as a secondary school, music school, cinema (est. 1919, one of the oldest in Upper Austria), police station and post office which also serves the neighbouring villages. Ottensheim also has Austria's 7th largest hydroelectric power plant, on the Danube.

== Politics ==
The governor of Ottensheim is Franz Füreder from the Austrian People's Party (ÖVP), who won the direct vote. The municipal council is formed by 10 mandates of the Austrian People's Party, 7 mandates of the Social Democratic Party of Austria (SPÖ), 7 of "Pro O" and one mandate of the right Freedom Party of Austria (FPÖ). The left party The Greens – The Green Alternative does not exist in Ottensheim, but has, with 20–25%, the highest rate of voters in Upper Austria in case of nationwide votes.
