= 2023 World Rowing Championships – Men's coxless pair =

Men's coxless pair at the 2023 World Rowing Championships
- Venue: Lake Sava
- Location: Belgrade, Serbia
- Dates: 3 September – 9 September
- Competitors: 52 from 26 nations
- Winning time: 6:51.09

Medalists
gold medal	Roman Röösli; Andrin Gulich	Switzerland
silver medal	Oliver Wynne-Griffith; Thom George	Great Britain
bronze medal	Ross Corrigan; Nathan Timoney	Ireland

The men's coxless pair competition at the 2023 World Rowing Championships took place at Lake Sava, in Belgrade.

== Schedule ==
The schedule was as follows:

Date	Time	Round
Sunday 3 September 2023	12:54	Heats
Monday 4 September 2023	13:05	Repechages
Wednesday 6 September 2023	13:18	Quarterfinals
Wednesday 6 September 2023	16:19	Final E
Thursday 7 September 2023	09:55	Semifinals A/B
Thursday 7 September 2023	16:45	Semifinals C/D
Saturday 9 September 2023	09:37	Final D
Saturday 9 September 2023	10:05	Final C
Saturday 9 September 2023	11:20	Final B
Saturday 9 September 2023	13:51	Final A

All times are Central European Summer Time (UTC+2)

== Results ==
=== Heats ===
The four fastest boats in each heat advanced directly to the quarterfinals. The remaining boats were sent to the repechages.

==== Heat 1 ====
Rank	Rower	Country	Time	Notes
1	Roman Röösli; Andrin Gulich	Switzerland	6:26.62	QAD
2	Benjamin Taylor; Phillip Wilson	New Zealand	6:30.51	QAD
3	Domantas Stankūnas; Dovydas Stankūnas	Lithuania	6:37.08	QAD
4	Adrián Juhász; Béla Simon	Hungary	6:50.19	QAD
5	Abe Wiersma; Nelson Ritsema	Netherlands	7:06.01	R
6	Mahmoud Ammar Abouelserie; Mahmoud Ahmed	Egypt	7:17.19	R

==== Heat 2 ====
Rank	Rower	Country	Time	Notes
1	Jaime Canalejo; Javier García	Spain	6:19.85	QAD
2	Ross Corrigan; Nathan Timoney	Ireland	6:21.04	QAD
3	John Smith; Christopher Baxter	South Africa	6:26.11	QAD
4	Jannik Metzger; Julius Christ	Germany	6:31.05	QAD
5	Jerzy Kaczmarek; Emilian Jackowiak	Poland	6:39.74	R

==== Heat 3 ====
Rank	Rower	Country	Time	Notes
1	Oliver Wynne-Griffith; Thom George	Great Britain	6:25.11	QAD
2	Frederic Vystavel; Joachim Sutton	Denmark	6:29.09	QAD
3	Davide Comini; Giovanni Codato	Italy	6:33.20	QAD
4	Joshua King; Luke Gadsdon	Canada	6:49.27	QAD
5	Jaka Čas; Nik Krebs	Slovenia	6:50.87	R

==== Heat 4 ====
Rank	Rower	Country	Time	Notes
1	Marius Cozmiuc; Sergiu Bejan	Romania	6:25.66	QAD
2	William Bender; Evan Olson	United States	6:26.94	QAD
3	Siarhei Valadzko; Dzmitry Furman	Individual Neutral Athletes	6:29.09	QAD
4	Zhang Yuanze; Dou Xiaowei	China	6:30.00	QAD
5	Tomáš Šišma; Lukáš Helešic	Czech Republic	6:33.95	R

==== Heat 5 ====
Rank	Rower	Country	Time	Notes
1	Simon Keenan; Fergus Hamilton	Australia	6:22.45	QAD
2	Martin Mačković; Miloš Vasić	Serbia	6:25.32	QAD
3	Patrik Lončarić; Anton Lončarić	Croatia	6:27.51	QAD
4	Florian Ludwig; Armand Pfister	France	6:29.00	QAD
5	Aytimur Selçuk; Enes Biber	Turkey	6:30.02	R

=== Repechage ===
The four fastest boats advanced to the quarterfinals. The remaining boats were sent to the Final E.

Rank	Rower	Country	Time	Notes
1	Jerzy Kaczmarek; Emilian Jackowiak	Poland	7:08.69	QAD
2	Tomáš Šišma; Lukáš Helešic	Czech Republic	7:08.88	QAD
3	Jaka Čas; Nik Krebs	Slovenia	7:09.84	QAD
4	Abe Wiersma; Nelson Ritsema	Netherlands	7:12.13	QAD
5	Aytimur Selçuk; Enes Biber	Turkey	7:20.87	FE
6	Mahmoud Ammar Abouelserie; Mahmoud Ahmed	Egypt	7:45.76	FE

=== Quarterfinals ===
The three fastest boats in Quarterfinal advanced to the AB semifinals. The remaining boats were sent to the CD semifinals.

==== Quarterfinal 1 ====
Rank	Rower	Country	Time	Notes
1	Roman Röösli; Andrin Gulich	Switzerland	7:06.12	SA/B
2	Ross Corrigan; Nathan Timoney	Ireland	7:08.20	SA/B
3	Davide Comini; Giovanni Codato	Italy	7:13.74	SA/B
4	Zhang Yuanze; Dou Xiaowei	China	7:19.25	SC/D
5	Martin Mačković; Miloš Vasić	Serbia	7:40.66	SC/D
6	Jaka Čas; Nik Krebs	Slovenia	7:58.92	SC/D

==== Quarterfinal 2 ====
Rank	Rower	Country	Time	Notes
1	Jaime Canalejo; Javier García	Spain	7:02.91	SA/B
2	William Bender; Evan Olson	United States	7:03.93	SA/B
3	Benjamin Taylor; Phillip Wilson	New Zealand	7:08.78	SA/B
4	Florian Ludwig; Armand Pfister	France	7:18.89	SC/D
5	Joshua King; Luke Gadsdon	Canada	7:22.22	SC/D
6	Jerzy Kaczmarek; Emilian Jackowiak	Poland	7:25.74	SC/D

==== Quarterfinal 3 ====
Rank	Rower	Country	Time	Notes
1	Oliver Wynne-Griffith; Thom George	Great Britain	7:04.21	SA/B
2	John Smith; Christopher Baxter	South Africa	7:06.43	SA/B
3	Simon Keenan; Fergus Hamilton	Australia	7:08.30	SA/B
4	Siarhei Valadzko; Dzmitry Furman	Individual Neutral Athletes	7:13.98	SC/D
5	Adrián Juhász; Béla Simon	Hungary	7:23.59	SC/D
6	Abe Wiersma; Nelson Ritsema	Netherlands	7:26.21	SC/D

==== Quarterfinal 4 ====
Rank	Rower	Country	Time	Notes
1	Marius Cozmiuc; Sergiu Bejan	Romania	6:46.12	SA/B
2	Frederic Vystavel; Joachim Sutton	Denmark	6:52.019	SA/B
3	Patrik Lončarić; Anton Lončarić	Croatia	6:57.59	SA/B
4	Domantas Stankūnas; Dovydas Stankūnas	Lithuania	7:05.80	SC/D
5	Jannik Metzger; Julius Christ	Germany	7:06.40	SC/D
6	Tomáš Šišma; Lukáš Helešic	Czech Republic	7:13.61	SC/D

=== Semifinals C/D ===
The three fastest boats in each semifinal advanced to the C final. The remaining boats were sent to the D final.

==== Semifinal 1 ====
Rank	Rower	Country	Time	Notes
1	Siarhei Valadzko; Dzmitry Furman	Individual Neutral Athletes	6:52.94	FC
2	Zhang Yuanze; Dou Xiaowei	China	6:55.43	FC
3	Jannik Metzger; Julius Christ	Germany	6:55.66	FC
4	Tomáš Šišma; Lukáš Helešic	Czech Republic	7:05.67	FD
5	Joshua King; Luke Gadsdon	Canada	7:09.42	FD
6	Jaka Čas; Nik Krebs	Slovenia	7:11.77	FD

==== Semifinal 2 ====
Rank	Rower	Country	Time	Notes
1	Martin Mačković; Miloš Vasić	Serbia	6:53.88	FC
2	Domantas Stankūnas; Dovydas Stankūnas	Lithuania	6:56.65	FC
3	Florian Ludwig; Armand Pfister	France	7:02.61	FC
4	Abe Wiersma; Nelson Ritsema	Netherlands	7:05.65	FD
5	Adrián Juhász; Béla Simon	Hungary	7:05.88	FD
6	Jerzy Kaczmarek; Emilian Jackowiak	Poland	7:06.61	FD

=== Semifinals A/B ===
The three fastest boats in each semifinal advanced to the A final. The remaining boats were sent to the B final.

==== Semifinal 1 ====
Rank	Rower	Country	Time	Notes
1	Oliver Wynne-Griffith; Thom George	Great Britain	6:59.61	FA
2	Roman Röösli; Andrin Gulich	Switzerland	7:01.60	FA
3	William Bender; Evan Olson	United States	7:03.33	FA
4	Patrik Lončarić; Anton Lončarić	Croatia	7:10.73	FB
5	Davide Comini; Giovanni Codato	Italy	7:15.11	FB
6	Frederic Vystavel; Joachim Sutton	Denmark	7:23.24	FB

==== Semifinal 2 ====
Rank	Rower	Country	Time	Notes
1	Marius Cozmiuc; Sergiu Bejan	Romania	6:51.21	FA
2	Ross Corrigan; Nathan Timoney	Ireland	6:54.70	FA
3	John Smith; Christopher Baxter	South Africa	6:55.67	FA
4	Jaime Canalejo; Javier García	Spain	6:59.70	FB
5	Simon Keenan; Fergus Hamilton	Australia	7:01.85	FB
6	Benjamin Taylor; Phillip Wilson	New Zealand	7:08.44	FB

=== Finals ===
The A final determined the rankings for places 1 to 6. Additional rankings were determined in the other finals.

==== Final E ====
Rank	Rower	Country	Time	Total rank
1	Aytimur Selçuk; Enes Biber	Turkey	7:23.70	25
2	Mahmoud Ammar Abouelserie; Mahmoud Ahmed	Egypt	7:51.92	26

==== Final D ====
Rank	Rower	Country	Time	Total rank
1	Abe Wiersma; Nelson Ritsema	Netherlands	6:34.43	19
2	Adrián Juhász; Béla Simon	Hungary	6:36.00	20
3	Joshua King; Luke Gadsdon	Canada	6:36.67	21
4	Tomáš Šišma; Lukáš Helešic	Czech Republic	6:37.46	22
5	Jaka Čas; Nik Krebs	Slovenia	6:38.74	23
6	Jerzy Kaczmarek; Emilian Jackowiak	Poland	6:47.21	24

==== Final C ====
Rank	Rower	Country	Time	Total rank
1	Domantas Stankūnas; Dovydas Stankūnas	Lithuania	6:30.33	13
2	Siarhei Valadzko; Dzmitry Furman	Individual Neutral Athletes	6:31.31	14
3	Jannik Metzger; Julius Christ	Germany	6:33.08	15
4	Zhang Yuanze; Dou Xiaowei	China	6:34.35	16
5	Florian Ludwig; Armand Pfister	France	6:35.62	17
6	Martin Mačković; Miloš Vasić	Serbia	6:50.12	18

==== Final B ====
Rank	Rower	Country	Time	Total rank
1	Jaime Canalejo; Javier García	Spain	6:35.76	7
2	Simon Keenan; Fergus Hamilton	Australia	6:36.15	8
3	Benjamin Taylor; Phillip Wilson	New Zealand	6:37.28	9
4	Davide Comini; Giovanni Codato	Italy	6:37.45	10
5	Patrik Lončarić; Anton Lončarić	Croatia	6:38.27	11
6	Frederic Vystavel; Joachim Sutton	Denmark	6:38.43	12

==== Final A ====
Rank	Rower	Country	Time
1st place, gold medalist(s)	Roman Röösli; Andrin Gulich	Switzerland	6:51.09
2nd place, silver medalist(s)	Oliver Wynne-Griffith; Thom George	Great Britain	6:53.46
3rd place, bronze medalist(s)	Ross Corrigan; Nathan Timoney	Ireland	6:54.22
4	Marius Cozmiuc; Sergiu Bejan	Romania	6:56.89
5	William Bender; Evan Olson	United States	7:02.98
6	John Smith; Christopher Baxter	South Africa	7:08.10
