= Rowing at the 2024 Summer Olympics – Men's coxless pair =

Men's coxless pair at the Games of the XXXIII Olympiad
- Olympic rowing
- Venue: Stade nautique de Vaires-sur-Marne, National Olympic Nautical Stadium of Île-de-France, Vaires-sur-Marne
- Dates: 28 July – 2 August 2024

Medalists
| 1st place, gold medalist(s) | | Martin Sinković; Valent Sinković | Croatia |
| 2nd place, silver medalist(s) | | Oliver Wynne-Griffith; Thomas George | Great Britain |
| 3rd place, bronze medalist(s) | | Roman Röösli; Andrin Gulich | Switzerland |

The men's coxless pair event at the 2024 Summer Olympics took place from 28 July to 2 August 2024 at the Stade nautique de Vaires-sur-Marne, National Olympic Nautical Stadium of Île-de-France in Vaires-sur-Marne.

== Background ==
This was the 26th appearance of the event, which has been held at every Summer Olympics since 1904 with the exception of 1912.

== Qualification ==
Each National Olympic Committee (NOC) has been limited to a single boat (one rower) in the event since 1976.

== Competition format ==
This rowing event is a coxless pair event, meaning that each boat is propelled by two rowers. The "coxless" portion means that there is no coxswain. Each rower has one oar. The course uses the 2000 metres distance that became the Olympic standard in 1912.

During the first round three heats were held. The first three boats in each heat advanced to the semifinals, with the others relegated to the repechage.

The repechage offered rowers a second chance to qualify for the semifinals. Placing in the repechage determined which semifinal the boat would race in. The top three boats in the repechage moved on to the semifinals, with the remaining boats being eliminated.

Two semifinals were held, each with 6 boats. The top three boats from each heat advanced to Final A and competed for a medal. The remaining boats advanced to Final B.

The third and final round was the finals. Each final determined a set of rankings. The A final determined the medals, along with the rest of the places through 6th, while the B final gave rankings from 7th to 12th.

== Schedule ==
The competition was held over eight days. Times given are session start times; multiple rowing events might have races during a session.

All times are Central European Summer Time (UTC+2)

| Date | Time | Round |
|---|---|---|
| Sunday, 28 July 2024 | 10:30 | Heats |
| Monday, 29 July 2024 | 10:30 | Repechage |
| Wednesday, 31 July 2024 | 10:54 | Semifinals |
| Friday, 2 August 2024 | 10:54 | Finals |

== Results ==
=== Heats ===
The first three of each heat qualified for the semifinals, while the remainder went to the repechage.

==== Heat 1 ====
| Rank | Lane | Rower | Nation | Time | Notes |
|---|---|---|---|---|---|
| 1 | 1 | Jaime Canalejo Pazos; Javier García Ordóñez | Spain | 6:32.28 | Q |
| 2 | 5 | Daniel Williamson; Phillip Wilson | New Zealand | 6:32.44 | Q |
| 3 | 2 | Ross Corrigan; Nathan Timoney | Ireland | 6:32.69 | Q |
| 4 | 3 | Roman Röösli; Andrin Gulich | Switzerland | 6:32.71 | R |
| 5 | 4 | Billy Bender; Oliver Bub | United States | 7:02.62 | R |

==== Heat 2 ====
| Rank | Lane | Rower | Nation | Time | Notes |
|---|---|---|---|---|---|
| 1 | 4 | Martin Sinković; Valent Sinković | Croatia | 6:35.28 | Q |
| 2 | 2 | Florin Arteni; Florin Lehaci | Romania | 6:40.29 | Q |
| 3 | 1 | Dovydas Stankūnas; Domantas Stankūnas | Lithuania | 6:44.59 | Q |
| 4 | 3 | Davide Comini; Giovanni Codato | Italy | 6:50.25 | R |

==== Heat 3 ====
| Rank | Lane | Rower | Nation | Time | Notes |
|---|---|---|---|---|---|
| 1 | 2 | Oliver Wynne-Griffith; Thomas George | Great Britain | 6:33.88 | Q |
| 2 | 4 | John Smith; Christopher Baxter | South Africa | 6:36.71 | Q |
| 3 | 3 | Julius Christ; Soenke Kruse | Germany | 6:38.86 | Q |
| 4 | 1 | Patrick Holt; Simon Keenan | Australia | 6:49.79 | R |

=== Repechage ===
The first three pairs in the repechage qualified for the semifinals, while the fourth pair was eliminated.

| Rank | Lane | Rower | Nation | Time | Notes |
|---|---|---|---|---|---|
| 1 | 3 | Roman Röösli; Andrin Gulich | Switzerland | 6:47.38 | Q |
| 2 | 4 | Davide Comini; Giovanni Codato | Italy | 6:50.31 | Q |
| 3 | 1 | Billy Bender; Oliver Bub | United States | 6:51.32 | Q |
| 4 | 2 | Patrick Holt; Simon Keenan | Australia | 6:53.40 | |

=== Semifinals ===
The first three of each heat qualify to the Final A, other to Final B

==== Semifinal A/B 1 ====
| Rank | Lane | Rower | Nation | Time | Notes |
|---|---|---|---|---|---|
| 1 | 3 | Martin Sinković; Valent Sinković | Croatia | 6:29.98 | FA |
| 2 | 6 | Roman Röösli; Andrin Gulich | Switzerland | 6:32.18 | FA |
| 3 | 4 | Jaime Canalejo Pazos; Javier García Ordóñez | Spain | 6:36.30 | FA |
| 4 | 5 | John Smith; Christopher Baxter | South Africa | 6:40.35 | FB |
| 5 | 2 | Dovydas Stankūnas; Domantas Stankūnas | Lithuania | 6:43.60 | FB |
| 6 | 1 | Billy Bender; Oliver Bub | United States | 6:46.11 | FB |

==== Semifinal A/B 2 ====
| Rank | Lane | Rower | Nation | Time | Notes |
|---|---|---|---|---|---|
| 1 | 2 | Florin Arteni; Florin Lehaci | Romania | 6:29.86 | FA |
| 2 | 3 | Oliver Wynne-Griffith; Thomas George | Great Britain | 6:31.56 | FA |
| 3 | 5 | Ross Corrigan; Nathan Timoney | Ireland | 6:32.22 | FA |
| 4 | 4 | Dan Williamson; Phillip Wilson | New Zealand | 6:32.77 | FB |
| 5 | 6 | Davide Comini; Giovanni Codato | Italy | 6:45.86 | FB |
| 6 | 1 | Julius Christ; Soenke Kruse | Germany | 6:47.13 | FB |

=== Finals ===
==== Final B ====
| Rank | Lane | Rower | Nation | Time | Notes |
|---|---|---|---|---|---|
| 7 | 3 | Dan Williamson; Phillip Wilson | New Zealand | 6:24.55 | |
| 8 | 5 | Dovydas Stankūnas; Domantas Stankūnas | Lithuania | 6:25.94 | |
| 9 | 4 | John Smith; Christopher Baxter | South Africa | 6:27.11 | |
| 10 | 6 | Billy Bender; Oliver Bub | United States | 6:28.57 | |
| 11 | 1 | Julius Christ; Soenke Kruse | Germany | 6:28.61 | |
| 12 | 2 | Davide Comini; Giovanni Codato | Italy | 6:28.62 | |

==== Final A ====
| Rank | Lane | Rower | Nation | Time | Notes |
|---|---|---|---|---|---|
| 1st place, gold medalist(s) | 3 | Martin Sinković; Valent Sinković | Croatia | 6:23.66 | |
| 2nd place, silver medalist(s) | 5 | Oliver Wynne-Griffith; Thomas George | Great Britain | 6:24.11 | |
| 3rd place, bronze medalist(s) | 2 | Roman Röösli; Andrin Gulich | Switzerland | 6:24.76 | |
| 4 | 1 | Florin Arteni; Florin Lehaci | Romania | 6:25.61 | |
| 5 | 4 | Jaime Canalejo Pazos; Javier García Ordóñez | Spain | 6:29.60 | |
| 6 | 6 | Ross Corrigan; Nathan Timoney | Ireland | 6:30.49 | |
