= 2026 World Rowing Championships – Men's coxless pair =

Men's coxless pair at the 2026 World Rowing Championships
- Venue: Bosbaan
- Location: Amsterdam, Netherlands
- Dates: 24–28 August
- Competitors: 38 from 19 nations
- Winning time: 6:16.62

Medalists
gold medal	Oliver Welch; Benjamin Taylor	New Zealand
silver medal	Angus Dawson; Alex Hill	Australia
bronze medal	Matteo Lodo; Giovanni Codato	Italy

The men's coxless pair competition at the 2026 World Rowing Championships took place at Bosbaan, in Amsterdam.

== Schedule ==
The schedule was as follows:

Date	Time	Round
Monday 24 August 2026	17:56	Heats
Wednesday 26 August 2026	15:29	Final C
Wednesday 26 August 2026	17:37	Semifinals
Friday, 28 August 2026	14:59	Final B
Friday, 28 August 2026	17:43	Final A

All times are Central European Summer Time (UTC+2)

== Results ==
=== Heats ===
The two fastest boats in each heat and the four fastest times advanced to the semifinals. Other crews to Final C and remaining crew eliminated.

==== Heat 1 ====
Rank	Rower	Country	Time	Notes
1	Ștefan Berariu; Florin Lehaci	Romania	7:03.09	SF
2	Fergus Woolnough; Matt Aldridge	Great Britain	7:11.07	SF
3	Antonios Papakonstantinou; Andreas Bourkas	Greece	7:16.75	SF
4	Samuel Halbert; Blake Vogel	United States	7:20.93	FC
5	Isak Žvegelj; Jakob Brglez	Slovenia	7:33.57	FC

==== Heat 2 ====
Rank	Rower	Country	Time	Notes
1	Oliver Welch; Benjamin Taylor	New Zealand	7:05.37	SF
2	Patrik Lončarić; Anton Lončarić	Croatia	7:12.04	SF
3	Jonah Plock; Patrick Brunner	Switzerland	7:15.67	SF
4	Jonas Richter; Erik Källström	Sweden	7:25.52	FC
5	Vipul Satish Ghurde; Saurav Kumar	India	7:43.82	

==== Heat 3 ====
Rank	Rower	Country	Time	Notes
1	Matteo Lodo; Giovanni Codato	Italy	7:03.56	SF
2	Dovydas Stankūnas; Domantas Stankūnas	Lithuania	7:08.91	SF
3	Jonathan Wang-Norderud; Syvert Senumstad	Norway	7:11.72	SF
4	Cao Chuang; Yang Mengshuai	China	7:20.16	FC
5	Leonard Brahms; Tobias Strangemann	Germany	7:22.38	FC

==== Heat 4 ====
Rank	Rower	Country	Time	Notes
1	Javier García; Jaime Canalejo	Spain	7:09.75	SF
2	Angus Dawson; Alex Hill	Australia	7:14.02	SF
3	Oleg Dudko; Ivan Kladov	Individual Neutral Athletes	7:19.47	SF
4	Ross Corrigan; Nathan Timoney	Ireland	7:21.12	FC

=== Semifinals ===
The three fastest boats in each heat advance to the Final A. The remaining boats were sent to the Final B.

==== Semifinal 1 ====
Rank	Rower	Country	Time	Notes
1	Oliver Welch; Benjamin Taylor	New Zealand	6:39.99	FA
2	Angus Dawson; Alex Hill	Australia	6:41.84	FA
3	Ștefan Berariu; Florin Lehaci	Romania	6:43.11	FA
4	Fergus Woolnough; Matt Aldridge	Great Britain	6:45.45	FB
5	Antonios Papakonstantinou; Andreas Bourkas	Greece	6:46.02	FB
6	Jonah Plock; Patrick Brunner	Switzerland	6:47.75	FB

==== Semifinal 2 ====
Rank	Rower	Country	Time	Notes
1	Matteo Lodo; Giovanni Codato	Italy	6:42.89	FA
2	Javier García; Jaime Canalejo	Spain	6:45.73	FA
3	Dovydas Stankūnas; Domantas Stankūnas	Lithuania	6:46.44	FA
4	Jonathan Wang-Norderud; Syvert Senumstad	Norway	6:48.00	FB
5	Oleg Dudko; Ivan Kladov	Individual Neutral Athletes	6:59.66	FB
6	Patrik Lončarić; Anton Lončarić	Croatia	7:09.06	FB

=== Finals ===
The A final determined the rankings for places 1 to 6. Additional rankings were determined in the other finals.

==== Final C ====
Rank	Rower	Country	Time	Total rank
1	Samuel Halbert; Blake Vogel	United States	6:51.74	13
2	Ross Corrigan; Nathan Timoney	Ireland	6:54.02	14
3	Leonard Brahms; Tobias Strangemann	Germany	6:54.48	15
4	Isak Žvegelj; Jakob Brglez	Slovenia	6:55.95	16
5	Jonas Richter; Erik Källström	Sweden	6:57.17	17
6	Cao Chuang; Yang Mengshuai	China	7:08.83	18

==== Final B ====
Rank	Rower	Country	Time	Total rank
1	Antonios Papakonstantinou; Andreas Bourkas	Greece	6:21.15	7
2	Fergus Woolnough; Matt Aldridge	Great Britain	6:23.19	8
3	Jonathan Wang-Norderud; Syvert Senumstad	Norway	6:26.54	9
4	Oleg Dudko; Ivan Kladov	Individual Neutral Athletes	6:29.11	10
5	Jonah Plock; Patrick Brunner	Switzerland	6:34.48	11
6	Patrik Lončarić; Anton Lončarić	Croatia	6:40.67	12

==== Final A ====
Rank	Rower	Country	Time
1st place, gold medalist(s)	Oliver Welch; Benjamin Taylor	New Zealand	6:16.62
2nd place, silver medalist(s)	Angus Dawson; Alex Hill	Australia	6:18.50
3rd place, bronze medalist(s)	Matteo Lodo; Giovanni Codato	Italy	6:19.68
4	Ștefan Berariu; Florin Lehaci	Romania	6:24.35
5	Javier García; Jaime Canalejo	Spain	6:25.98
6	Dovydas Stankūnas; Domantas Stankūnas	Lithuania	6:34.68
