= 2025 World Rowing Championships – Men's coxless pair =

Men's coxless pair at the 2025 World Rowing Championships
- Venue: Dianshan Lake
- Location: Shanghai, China
- Dates: 21–25 September
- Competitors: 42 from 21 nations
- Winning time: 6:37.87

Medalists
gold medal	Oliver Welch; Benjamin Taylor	New Zealand
silver medal	Florin Arteni; Florin Lehaci	Romania
bronze medal	Jonah Plock; Patrick Brunner	Switzerland

The men's coxless pair competition at the 2025 World Rowing Championships took place at Dianshan Lake, in Shanghai.

== Schedule ==
The schedule was as follows:

Date	Time	Round
Sunday 21 September 2025	10:37	Heats
Tuesday 23 September 2025	10:57	Semifinals
Tuesday 23 September 2025	11:32	Final D
Tuesday 23 September 2025	11:44	Final C
Thursday, 25 September 2025	13:41	Final B
Thursday, 25 September 2025	14:44	Final A

All times are UTC+08:00

== Results ==
=== Heats ===
The two fastest boats in each heat and the next four fastest times advanced to the semifinals. The remaining boats were sent to Final C and Final D.

==== Heat 1 ====
Rank	Rower	Country	Time	Notes
1	Jaime Canalejo; Javier García	Spain	6:21.19	SF
2	Jonas Richter; Hugo Nerud	Sweden	6:21.60	SF
3	James Vogel; Harry Geffen	United Kingdom	6:21.88	SF
4	Dalibor Nedela; Jakub Podrazil	Czech Republic	6:30.03	FC
5	Kasper Virnekaes; Simon Schubert	Germany	6:34.30	FC
6	Chan Yu Xuan; Bin Mohd Rusok Mohd Arif Ashraf	Malaysia	7:46.39	FD

==== Heat 2 ====
Rank	Rower	Country	Time	Notes
1	Florin Arteni; Florin Lehaci	Romania	6:20.62	SF
2	Ross Corrigan; Nathan Timoney	Ireland	6:24.33	SF
3	Christian Søndergaard; Kaare Mortensen	Denmark	6:27.05	SF
4	Roman Lomachev; Aleksei Vorobev	Individual Neutral Athletes	6:34.13	FC
5	Fraser Miscamble; Nicholas Smith	Australia	6:39.27	FD

==== Heat 3 ====
Rank	Rower	Country	Time	Notes
1	Florian Ludwig; Alistair Gicqueau	France	6:19.99	SF
2	Jonah Plock; Patrick Brunner	Switzerland	6:20.20	SF
3	Ralf Rienks; Rik Rienks	Netherlands	6:21.35	SF
4	Ching Wong; Chi Fung Chan	Hong Kong	6:33.61	FC
5	Moon Jong-won; Kang Min-seong	South Korea	6:40.59	FD

==== Heat 4 ====
Rank	Rower	Country	Time	Notes
1	Oliver Welch; Benjamin Taylor	New Zealand	6:16.60	SF
2	Damien Bonhage-Koen; Christopher Baxter	South Africa	6:19.76	SF
3	Arnedas Kelmelis; Povilas Juškevičius	Lithuania	6:22.47	SF
4	Jonathan Wang-Norderud; Syvert Senumstad	Norway	6:29.64	FC
5	Ivan Chernukhin; Vladislav Yakovlev	Kazakhstan	6:38.30	FC

=== Semifinals ===
The three fastest boats in each heat advanced to the Final A. The remaining boats were sent to Final B.

==== Semifinal 1 ====
Rank	Rower	Country	Time	Notes
1	Oliver Welch; Benjamin Taylor	New Zealand	6:25.89	FA
2	Jaime Canalejo; Javier García	Spain	6:28.56	FA
3	Ross Corrigan; Nathan Timoney	Ireland	6:29.99	FA
4	Ralf Rienks; Rik Rienks	Netherlands	6:31.19	FB
5	Damien Bonhage-Koen; Christopher Baxter	South Africa	6:31.48	FB
6	Christian Søndergaard; Kaare Mortensen	Denmark	6:41.25	FB

==== Semifinal 2 ====
Rank	Rower	Country	Time	Notes
1	Florin Arteni; Florin Lehaci	Romania	6:21.99	FA
2	Jonah Plock; Patrick Brunner	Switzerland	6:26.82	FA
3	Arnedas Kelmelis; Povilas Juškevičius	Lithuania	6:28.22	FA
4	Florian Ludwig; Alistair Gicqueau	France	6:29.47	FB
5	Jonas Richter; Hugo Nerud	Sweden	6:32.30	FB
6	James Vogel; Harry Geffen	United Kingdom	6:34.11	FB

=== Finals ===
==== Final D ====
Rank	Rower	Country	Time	Total Rank
1	Fraser Miscamble; Nicholas Smith	Australia	6:42.29	19
2	Moon Jong-won; Kang Min-seong	South Korea	6:52.72	20
3	Chan Yu Xuan; Bin Mohd Rusok Mohd Arif Ashraf	Malaysia	7:44.79	21

==== Final C ====
Rank	Rower	Country	Time	Total Rank
1	Jonathan Wang-Norderud; Syvert Senumstad	Norway	6:42.42	13
2	Dalibor Nedela; Jakub Podrazil	Czech Republic	6:43.53	14
3	Kasper Virnekaes; Simon Schubert	Germany	6:45.77	15
4	Ivan Chernukhin; Vladislav Yakovlev	Kazakhstan	6:48.66	16
5	Roman Lomachev; Aleksei Vorobev	Individual Neutral Athletes	6:49.89	17
6	Ching Wong; Chi Fung Chan	Hong Kong	6:53.67	18

==== Final B ====
Rank	Rower	Country	Time	Total Rank
1	Florian Ludwig; Alistair Gicqueau	France	6:39.64	7
2	Ralf Rienks; Rik Rienks	Netherlands	6:42.26	8
3	Jonas Richter; Hugo Nerud	Sweden	6:42.73	9
4	Damien Bonhage-Koen; Christopher Baxter	South Africa	6:43.04	10
5	James Vogel; Harry Geffen	United Kingdom	6:53.40	11
6	Christian Søndergaard; Kaare Mortensen	Denmark	6:58.01	12

==== Final A ====
Rank	Rower	Country	Time	Total Rank
1st place, gold medalist(s)	Oliver Welch; Benjamin Taylor	New Zealand	6:37.87	1
2nd place, silver medalist(s)	Florin Arteni; Florin Lehaci	Romania	6:42.85	2
3rd place, bronze medalist(s)	Jonah Plock; Patrick Brunner	Switzerland	6:43.84	3
4	Jaime Canalejo; Javier García	Spain	6:50.17	4
5	Arnedas Kelmelis; Povilas Juškevičius	Lithuania	6:53.07	5
6	Ross Corrigan; Nathan Timoney	Ireland	7:00.73	6
