= 2022 World Rowing Championships – Men's coxless pair =

Men's coxless pair at the 2022 World Rowing Championships
- Venue: Labe aréna
- Location: Račice, Czech Republic
- Dates: 18 September – 24 September
- Competitors: 40 from 20 nations
- Winning time: 6:28.06

Medalists
gold medal	Marius Cozmiuc; Sergiu Bejan	Romania
silver medal	Jaime Canalejo; Javier García	Spain
bronze medal	Oliver Wynne-Griffith; Tom George	Great Britain

The men's coxless pair competition at the 2022 World Rowing Championships took place at the Račice regatta venue.

== Schedule ==
The schedule was as follows:

Date	Time	Round
Sunday 18 September 2022	12:26	Heats
Monday 19 September 2022	16:33	Repechages
Thursday 22 September 2022	10:40	Semifinals A/B
Thursday 22 September 2022	16:00	Semifinals C/D
Saturday 24 September 2022	10:00	Final D
Saturday 24 September 2022	10:32	Final C
Saturday 24 September 2022	11:56	Final B
Saturday 24 September 2022	13:51	Final A

All times are Central European Summer Time (UTC+2)

== Results ==
=== Heats ===
The two fastest boats in each heat advanced directly to the semifinals A/B. The remaining boats were sent to the repechages.

==== Heat 1 ====
Rank	Rower	Country	Time	Notes
1	Marius Cozmiuc; Sergiu Bejan	Romania	6:27.74	SA/B
2	Justin Best; Michael Grady	United States	6:31.35	SA/B
3	Patrik Lončarić; Anton Lončarić	Croatia	6:34.49	R
4	Christoph Seifriedsberger; Bruno Bachmair	Austria	6:35.70	R
5	Maurin Lange; Jan Jonah Plock	Switzerland	6:49.50	R

==== Heat 2 ====
Rank	Rower	Country	Time	Notes
1	Jaime Canalejo; Javier García	Spain	6:23.81	SA/B
2	Matt Macdonald; Tom Mackintosh	New Zealand	6:26.06	SA/B
3	Henry Torr; James Mitchell	South Africa	6:34.78	R
4	Davide Comini; Giovanni Codato	Italy	6:37.31	R
5	Jaka Čas; Nik Krebs	Slovenia	6:54.18	R

==== Heat 3 ====
Rank	Rower	Country	Time	Notes
1	Oliver Wynne-Griffith; Tom George	Great Britain	6:29.92	SA/B
2	Martin Mačković; Miloš Vasić	Serbia	6:35.38	SA/B
3	Bjorn van den Ende; Nelson Ritsema	Netherlands	6:39.83	R
4	Adam Kulhánek; Jan Chládek	Czech Republic	7:00.92	R
5	Hossam El Din Azouz; Ibrahim Elserougy	Egypt	7:07.67	R

==== Heat 4 ====
Rank	Rower	Country	Time	Notes
1	Harley Moore; Alexander Hill	Australia	6:34.83	SA/B
2	Adam Woźniak; Michał Szpakowski	Poland	6:35.38	SA/B
3	Lam San Tung; Wong Wai Chun	Hong Kong	6:40.50	R
4	Adrián Juhász; Béla Simon	Hungary	6:40.87	R
5	Dovydas Stankūnas; Domantas Stankūnas	Lithuania	6:56.06	R

=== Repechages ===
The two fastest boats in repechage advanced to the semifinals A/B. The remaining boats were sent to the C/D semifinals.

==== Repechage 1 ====
Rank	Rower	Country	Time	Notes
1	Dovydas Stankūnas; Domantas Stankūnas	Lithuania	6:30.96	SA/B
2	Davide Comini; Giovanni Codato	Italy	6:33.01	SA/B
3	Maurin Lange; Jan Jonah Plock	Switzerland	6:36.76	SC/D
4	Patrik Lončarić; Anton Lončarić	Croatia	6:43.66	SC/D
5	Adrián Juhász; Béla Simon	Hungary	6:45.49	SC/D
6	Bjorn van den Ende; Nelson Ritsema	Netherlands	6:45.96	SC/D

==== Repechage 2 ====
Rank	Rower	Country	Time	Notes
1	Henry Torr; James Mitchell	South Africa	6:31.82	SA/B
2	Christoph Seifriedsberger; Bruno Bachmair	Austria	6:34.37	SA/B
3	Lam San Tung; Wong Wai Chun	Hong Kong	6:38.54	SC/D
4	Jaka Čas; Nik Krebs	Slovenia	6:40.32	SC/D
5	Adam Kulhánek; Jan Chládek	Czech Republic	6:51.57	SC/D
6	Hossam El Din Azouz; Ibrahim Elserougy	Egypt	7:13.11	SC/D

=== Semifinals C/D ===
The three fastest boats in each semi were sent to the C final. The remaining boats were sent to the D final

==== Semifinal 1 ====
Rank	Rower	Country	Time	Notes
1	Bjorn van den Ende; Nelson Ritsema	Netherlands	6:49.70	FC
2	Jaka Čas; Nik Krebs	Slovenia	6:52.51	FC
3	Maurin Lange; Jan Jonah Plock	Switzerland	6:56.45	FC
4	Adam Kulhánek; Jan Chládek	Czech Republic	7:05.59	FD

==== Semifinal 2 ====
Rank	Rower	Country	Time	Notes
1	Patrik Lončarić; Anton Lončarić	Croatia	6:52.84	FC
2	Lam San Tung; Wong Wai Chun	Hong Kong	6:54.50	FC
3	Adrián Juhász; Béla Simon	Hungary	7:05.33	FC
4	Hossam El Din Azouz; Ibrahim Elserougy	Egypt	8:00.38	FD

=== Semifinals A/B ===
The three fastest boats in each semi were sent to the A final. The remaining boats were sent to the B final

==== Semifinal 1 ====
Rank	Rower	Country	Time	Notes
1	Oliver Wynne-Griffith; Tom George	Great Britain	6:28.57	FA
2	Marius Cozmiuc; Sergiu Bejan	Romania	6:28.94	FA
3	Matt Macdonald; Tom Mackintosh	New Zealand	6:34.96	FA
4	Henry Torr; James Mitchell	South Africa	6:38.60	FB
5	Adam Woźniak; Michał Szpakowski	Poland	6:41.32	FB
6	Davide Comini; Giovanni Codato	Italy	6:41.35	FB

==== Semifinal 2 ====
Rank	Rower	Country	Time	Notes
1	Jaime Canalejo; Javier García	Spain	6:30.84	FA
2	Harley Moore; Alexander Hill	Australia	6:32.15	FA
3	Martin Mačković; Miloš Vasić	Serbia	6:34.84	FA
4	Dovydas Stankūnas; Domantas Stankūnas	Lithuania	6:38.95	FB
5	Justin Best; Michael Grady	United States	6:44.55	FB
6	Christoph Seifriedsberger; Bruno Bachmair	Austria	7:00.10	FB

=== Finals ===
The A final determined the rankings for places 1 to 6. Additional rankings were determined in the other finals

==== Final D ====
Rank	Rower	Country	Time	Total rank
	Adam Kulhánek; Jan Chládek	Czech Republic		19
	Hossam El Din Azouz; Ibrahim Elserougy	Egypt	WD	20

==== Final C ====
Rank	Rower	Country	Time	Total rank
1	Maurin Lange; Jan Jonah Plock	Switzerland	6:40.48	13
2	Patrik Lončarić; Anton Lončarić	Croatia	6:41.52	14
3	Jaka Čas; Nik Krebs	Slovenia	6:43.37	15
4	Bjorn van den Ende; Nelson Ritsema	Netherlands	6:44.37	16
5	Lam San Tung; Wong Wai Chun	Hong Kong	6:48.35	17
6	Adrián Juhász; Béla Simon	Hungary	6:50.81	18

==== Final B ====
Rank	Rower	Country	Time	Total rank
1	Justin Best; Michael Grady	United States	6:30.59	7
2	Davide Comini; Giovanni Codato	Italy	6:32.06	8
3	Dovydas Stankūnas; Domantas Stankūnas	Lithuania	6:32.84	9
4	Adam Woźniak; Michał Szpakowski	Poland	6:36.78	10
5	Henry Torr; James Mitchell	South Africa	6:38.07	11
6	Christoph Seifriedsberger; Bruno Bachmair	Austria	6:48.48	12

==== Final A ====
Rank	Rower	Country	Time	Notes
1st place, gold medalist(s)	Marius Cozmiuc; Sergiu Bejan	Romania	6:28.06	
2nd place, silver medalist(s)	Jaime Canalejo; Javier García	Spain	6:29.27	
3rd place, bronze medalist(s)	Oliver Wynne-Griffith; Tom George	Great Britain	6:30.86	
4	Martin Mačković; Miloš Vasić	Serbia	6:33.98	
5	Harley Moore; Alexander Hill	Australia	6:37.90	
6	Matt Macdonald; Tom Mackintosh	New Zealand	6:38.54	
