= Switzerland at the 2024 Summer Olympics =

- IOC code: SUI
- NOC: Swiss Olympic Association
- Website: www.swissolympic.ch (in German and French)

in Paris, France 26 July 2024 – 11 August 2024
- Competitors: 128 (66 men and 62 women) in 18 sports
- Flag bearers: Nino Schurter & Nina Christen
- Medals Ranked 48th: Gold 1 Silver 2 Bronze 5 Total 8

Summer Olympics appearances (overview)
- 1896; 1900; ~~1904~~; 1908; 1912; 1920; 1924; 1928; 1932; 1936; 1948; 1952; 1956; 1960; 1964; 1968; 1972; 1976; 1980; 1984; 1988; 1992; 1996; 2000; 2004; 2008; 2012; 2016; 2020; 2024; 2028

Other related appearances
- 1906 Intercalated Games

Switzerland competed at the 2024 Summer Olympics in Paris from 26 July to 11 August 2024. Swiss athletes have appeared in every Summer Olympic Games edition of the modern era, except for a partial boycott of Melbourne 1956 in protest of the Soviet invasion of Hungary.

== Medalists ==
Medal	Name	Sport	Event	Date
Gold	Chiara Leone	Shooting	Women's 50 m rifle three positions	2 August
Silver	Julie Derron	Triathlon	Women's event	31 July
Silver	Steve Guerdat	Equestrian	Individual jumping	6 August
Bronze	Audrey Gogniat	Shooting	Women's 10 m air rifle	29 July
Bronze	Roman Mityukov	Swimming	Men's 200 m backstroke	1 August
Bronze	Roman Röösli; Andrin Gulich	Rowing	Men's coxless pair	2 August
Bronze	Zoé Claessens	Cycling	Women's BMX racing	2 August
Bronze	Tanja Hüberli; Nina Brunner	Volleyball	Women's Beach Volleyball	9 August

Medals by sport
Sport	1st place, gold medalist(s)	2nd place, silver medalist(s)	3rd place, bronze medalist(s)	Total
Shooting	1	0	1	2
Equestrian	0	1	0	1
Triathlon	0	1	0	1
Cycling	0	0	1	1
Rowing	0	0	1	1
Swimming	0	0	1	1
Volleyball	0	0	1	1
Total	1	2	5	8

Medals by gender
Gender	1st place, gold medalist(s)	2nd place, silver medalist(s)	3rd place, bronze medalist(s)	Total
Female	1	1	3	5
Male	0	1	2	3
Mixed	0	0	0	0
Total	1	2	5	8

Medals by date
Date	1st place, gold medalist(s)	2nd place, silver medalist(s)	3rd place, bronze medalist(s)	Total
29 July	0	0	1	1
31 July	0	1	0	1
1 August	0	0	1	1
2 August	1	0	2	3
6 August	0	1	0	1
9 August	0	0	1	1
Total	1	2	5	8

== Competitors ==
The following is the list of number of competitors in the Games.

Sport	Men	Women	Total
Athletics	11	20	31
Badminton	1	1	2
Canoeing	1	1	2
Cycling	7	11	18
Equestrian	6	3	9
Fencing	1	1	2
Golf	1	2	3
Gymnastics	5	1	6
Judo	2	1	3
Modern pentathlon	1	1	2
Rowing	12	5	17
Sailing	4	3	7
Shooting	2	4	6
Sport climbing	1	0	1
Swimming	7	1	8
Tennis	1	1	2
Triathlon	3	2	5
Volleyball	0	4	4
Total	66	62	128

== Athletics ==
Swiss track and field athletes achieved the entry standards for Paris 2024, either by passing the direct qualifying mark (or time for track and road races) or by world ranking, in the following events (a maximum of 3 athletes each):

Key

- Note–Ranks given for track events are within the athlete's heat only
- Q = Qualified for the next round
- q = Qualified for the next round as a fastest loser or, in field events, by position without achieving the qualifying target
- NR = National record
- N/A = Round not applicable for the event
- Bye = Athlete not required to compete in round

Track and road events

Athlete	Event	Heat		Repechage		Semifinal		Final	
Athlete	Event	Result	Rank	Result	Rank	Result	Rank	Result	Rank
William Reais	Men's 200 m	20.92	7 R	DNS		Did not advance			
Timothé Mumenthaler	Men's 200 m	20.63	5 R	20.67	3	Did not advance			
Felix Svensson	Men's 200 m	20.54	5 R	20.65	4	Did not advance			
Lionel Spitz	Men's 400 m	45.81	6 R	45.51	4	Did not advance			
Jonas Raess	Men's 5000 m	13:55.04	12	—N/a				Did not advance	
Jason Joseph	Men's 110 m hurdles	13.26	1 Q	Bye		13.44	6	Did not advance	
Julien Bonvin	Men's 400 m hurdles	49.82	6 R	49.08	3	Did not advance			
Tadesse Abraham	Men's marathon	—N/a						2:12:22	38
Matthias Kyburz	Men's marathon	—N/a						2:11:32	30
Géraldine Frey	Women's 100 m	11.34	38	—N/a		Did not advance			
Salomé Kora	Women's 100 m	11.35	39	—N/a		Did not advance			
Mujinga Kambundji	Women's 100 m	11.05	12 Q	—N/a		11.05	3 q	10.99	6
Mujinga Kambundji	Women's 200 m	22.75	3 Q	—N/a		22.63	4	Did not advance	
Léonie Pointet	Women's 200 m	23.42	6 R	23.37	4	Did not advance			
Audrey Werro	Women's 800 m	1:59.38	16 Re	2:00.62	11	Did not advance			
Rachel Pellaud	Women's 800 m	2:00:07	25 Q	Bye		2:03.36	8	Did not advance	
Valentina Rosamilia	Women's 800 m	2:00.45	29 Re	1:59.65	4 q	1:59.27	7	Did not advance	
Ditaji Kambundji	Women's 100 m hurdles	12.81	3 Q	Bye		12.68	5	Did not advance	
Yasmin Giger	Women's 400 m hurdles	55.44	4 Re	55.18	5	Did not advance			
Fabienne Schlumpf	Women's marathon	—N/a						2:28:10 SB	16
Helen Bekele Tola	Women's marathon	—N/a						2:29:43	22
Sarah Atcho-Jaquier; Léonie Pointet; Géraldine Frey; Mujinga Kambundji; Salome Kora; Emma van Camp	Women's 4 × 100 m relay	42.38 SB	3 Q	—N/a				DQ	
Annina Fahr; Catia Gubelmann; Yasmin Giger; Lena Wernli; Julia Niederberger; Giulia Senn	Women's 4 × 400 m relay	3:29.75	7	—N/a				Did not advance	
Lionel Spitz; Charles Devantay; Ricky Petrucciani; Giulia Senn; Yasmin Giger; Annina Fahr	Mixed 4 × 400 m relay	3:12.77	11 NR	—N/a				Did not advance	

Field events

Athlete	Event	Qualification		Final	
Athlete	Event	Distance	Position	Distance	Position
Simon Ehammer	Men's long jump	8.09	4 q	8.20	4
Angelica Moser	Women's pole vault	4.55	=1 Q	4.80	4
Pascale Stöcklin	Women's pole vault	4.20	27	Did not advance	

Combined events – Women's heptathlon

Athlete	Event	100H	HJ	SP	200 m	LJ	JT	800 m	Final	Rank
Annik Kälin	Result	12.87	1.74	14.02	23.88	6.59	48.14	2:11.33	6639	4
Annik Kälin	Points	1144	903	795	992	1036	824	945	6639	4

== Badminton ==
Switzerland entered two badminton players into the Olympic tournament based on the BWF Race to Paris Rankings.

Athlete	Event	Group stage			Elimination	Quarter-final	Semi-final	Final / BM	
Athlete	Event	Opposition Score	Opposition Score	Rank	Opposition Score	Opposition Score	Opposition Score	Opposition Score	Rank
Tobias Künzi	Men's singles	Li (CHN); L 0–2	Opeyori (NGR); W 2–0	2	Did not advance				
Jenjira Stadelmann	Women's singles	Marín (ESP); L 0–2	Darragh (IRL); W 2–1	2	Did not advance				

== Canoeing ==
=== Slalom ===
Switzerland entered two boats into the slalom competition for the Games through the 2023 ICF Canoe Slalom World Championships in London, Great Britain.

Athlete	Event	Preliminary						Semifinal		Final	
Athlete	Event	Run 1	Rank	Run 2	Rank	Best	Rank	Time	Rank	Time	Rank
Martin Dougoud	Men's K-1	86.30	3	138.24	22	86.30	6	93.07	7	89.44	4
Alena Marx	Women's K-1	102.13	18	98.22	14	98.22	17	123.62	19	Did not advance	
Alena Marx	Women's C-1	109.66	12	111.10	14	109.66	16	117.50	11	114.61	8

Kayak cross

Athlete	Event	Time trial		Round 1	Repechage	Heat	Quarterfinal	Semifinal	Final	
Athlete	Event	Time	Rank	Position	Position	Position	Position	Position	Position	Rank
Martin Dougoud	Men's KX-1	74.89	28	2 Q	Bye	2 Q	2 Q	4 FB	1	5
Alena Marx	Women's KX-1	78.29	27	2 Q	Bye	2 Q	2 Q	4 FB	2	6

== Cycling ==
=== Road ===
Switzerland entered a team of six road cyclists (two male and four female). Switzerland qualified two male and four female athletes through the UCI Nation Ranking and 2023 World Championships in Glasgow, Great Britain.

Men

Athlete	Event	Time	Rank
Stefan Bissegger	Road race	Withdrawn	
Marc Hirschi	Road race	6:21:47	16
Stefan Küng	Road race	6:20:50	7
Stefan Bissegger	Time trial	37:38.57	6
Stefan Küng	Time trial	37:47.67	8

Women

Athlete	Event	Time	Rank
Elise Chabbey	Road race	4:04.23	18
Noemi Rüegg	Road race	4:01.27	7
Linda Zanetti	Road race	4:10.47	65
Elena Hartmann	Road race	4:08.14	57
Elena Hartmann	Time trial	42:58.90	17

=== Track ===
Switzerland entered three riders for women's omnium, madison, and men's omnium events, based on the nation's performances, through the final UCI Olympic rankings.

Omnium

Athlete	Event	Scratch race		Tempo race		Elimination race		Points race		Total	
Athlete	Event	Rank	Points	Rank	Points	Rank	Points	Rank	Points	Rank	Points
Alex Vogel	Men's omnium	11	20	4	23	17	8	18	0	11	62
Aline Seitz	Women's omnium	9	24	11	20	19	4	5	21	69	12

Madison

Athlete	Event	Points	Laps	Rank
Michelle Andres; Aline Seitz	Women's madison	0	0	14

=== Mountain biking ===
Switzerland mountain bikers secured two men's and two women's quota places in the Olympic through the release of the final Olympic mountain biking rankings.

Athlete	Event	Time	Rank
Mathias Flückiger	Men's cross-country	1:27:42	5
Nino Schurter	Men's cross-country	1:28:44	9
Alessandra Keller	Women's cross-country	1:30:43	7
Sina Frei	Women's cross-country	1:35:34	21

=== BMX ===
Freestyle

Switzerland entered one BMX rider to compete in the women's freestyle, by finishing in the top six at the 2024 Olympic Qualifier Series.

Athlete	Event	Seeding		Final	
Athlete	Event	Score	Rank	Score	Rank
Nikita Ducarroz	Women's freestyle	79.78	10	Did not advance	

Race

Swiss riders secured four quota places (two men's and two women's) in the race for Paris 2024 through the allocations of the final Olympic BMX ranking.

Athlete	Event	Quarterfinal		Last Chance Race		Semifinal		Final	
Athlete	Event	Points	Rank	Time	Rank	Points	Rank	Result	Rank
Cédric Butti	Men's	10	8 Q	Bye		10	5 Q	32.124	4
Simon Marquart	Men's	17	19 q	33.328	2 Q	9	6 Q	44.914	7
Nadine Aeberhard	Women's	15	11 Q	Bye		19	13	Did not advance	
Zoé Claessens	Women's	8	8 Q	Bye		11	6 Q	35.060	3rd place, bronze medalist(s)

== Equestrian ==
Switzerland entered a full squad of equestrian riders to the team eventing competition through a top-seven finish at the 2022 FEI Eventing World Championships in Pratoni del Vivaro, Italy. Switzerland also entered one dressage rider into the games through the establishment of the final Olympics ranking.

=== Dressage ===
Athlete	Horse	Event	Grand Prix		Grand Prix Freestyle		Overall	
Athlete	Horse	Event	Score	Rank	Technical	Artistic	Score	Rank
Andrina Suter	Fibonacci	Individual	65.590	55	Did not advance			

Qualification Legend: Q = Qualified for the final based on position in group; q = Qualified for the final based on overall position

=== Eventing ===
Athlete	Horse	Event	Dressage		Cross-country			Jumping						Total	
Athlete	Horse	Event	Dressage		Cross-country			Qualifier			Final			Total	
Athlete	Horse	Event	Penalties	Rank	Penalties	Total	Rank	Penalties	Total	Rank	Penalties	Total	Rank	Penalties	Rank
Robin Godel	Grandeur De Lully CH	Individual	29.1	20	9.6	38.7	26	13.2	51.9	30	Did not advance				
Mélody Johner	Toubleu De Rueire	Individual	38.4	55	3.2	41.6	30	8.8	50.4	29	Did not advance				
Felix Vogg	Dao De L'Ocean	Individual	22.1	5	0.0	22.1	4	4.0	26.1	6	4.4	30.5	8	30.5	8
Robin Godel; Mélody Johner; Felix Vogg	See above	Team	89.6	7	12.8	102.4	4	26	128.4	5	—N/a			128.4	5

=== Jumping ===
Athlete	Horse	Event	Qualification		Final		
Athlete	Horse	Event	Penalties	Rank	Penalties	Time	Rank
Steve Guerdat	Dynamix de Belheme	Individual	0	6 Q	0	80.99	2nd place, silver medalist(s)
Martin Fuchs	Leone Jei	Individual	0	5 Q	4	82.21	10
Edouard Schmitz	Gamin Van't Naast-veldhof	Individual	8	45	Did not advance		
Steve Guerdat; Martin Fuchs; Pius Schwizer	Dynamix de Belheme	Team	24	12	Did not advance		
Steve Guerdat; Martin Fuchs; Pius Schwizer	Leone Jei	Team	24	12	Did not advance		
Steve Guerdat; Martin Fuchs; Pius Schwizer	Vancouver de Lanlore	Team	24	12	Did not advance		

== Fencing ==
Switzerland entered two fencers into the Olympic competition. Pauline Brunner qualified for the games by winning the women's épée at the 2024 Europe Zonal Qualifying Tournament in Differdange, Luxembourg. Later on, Alexis Bayard receive the re-allocations of unused quota places.

Athlete	Event	Round of 64	Round of 32	Round of 16	Quarterfinal	Semifinal	Final / BM	
Athlete	Event	Opposition Score	Opposition Score	Opposition Score	Opposition Score	Opposition Score	Opposition Score	Rank
Alexis Bayard	Men's épée	Bye	Loyola (BEL); L 9–15	Did not advance				
Pauline Brunner	Women's épée	Bye	Husisian (USA); L 11–12	Did not advance				

== Golf ==
Switzerland entered three golfers into the Olympic tournament. Joel Girrbach, Albane Valenzuela, and Morgane Métraux qualified directly for the games in the competitions based on their own world ranking positions on the IGF World Rankings.

Athlete	Event	Round 1	Round 2	Round 3	Round 4	Total		
Athlete	Event	Score	Score	Score	Score	Score	Par	Rank
Joel Girrbach	Men's	69	72	70	76	287	+3	T49
Albane Valenzuela	Women's	72	74	74	65	285	−3	T13
Morgane Métraux	Women's	70	66	71	79	286	−2	T18

== Gymnastics ==
=== Artistic ===
Switzerland fielded a squad of five male gymnasts for Paris after advancing to the final round of team all-around and obtained one of nine available team spots for nations not yet qualified at the 2023 World Championships in Antwerp, Belgium.

Men
Team

Athlete	Event	Qualification								Final							
Athlete	Event	Apparatus						Total	Rank	Apparatus						Total	Rank
Athlete	Event	F	PH	R	V	PB	HB	Total	Rank	F	PH	R	V	PB	HB	Total	Rank
Luca Giubellini	Team	13.666	~~13.000~~	—N/a	14.600	—N/a				—N/a	13.166	13.300	—N/a	14.366	13.466	—N/a	
Matteo Giubellini	Team	13.800	14.233	13.233	~~13.900~~	14.500	13.400	83.066	12 Q	14.000	14.000	—N/a	13.433	—N/a	—N/a	—N/a	
Florian Langenegger	Team	~~13.633~~	13.633	12.933	14.433	~~14.166~~	13.100	81.898	20 Q	13.700	—N/a	13.400	14.066	—N/a	—N/a	—N/a	
Noe Seifert	Team	14.100	13.866	13.366	14.066	14.600	~~11.800~~	81.798	21	13.966	13.633	13.533	—N/a	14.400	12.866	—N/a	
Taha Serhani	Team	—N/a				14.500	13.633	—N/a		—N/a	—N/a	—N/a	14.133	14.233	13.566	—N/a	
Total	Team	41.566	41.732	39.532	43.099	43.600	40.133	249.662	7 Q	41.866	40.799	40.233	41.632	42.999	39.898	247.427	7

Individual finals

Athlete	Event	Qualification								Final							
Athlete	Event	Apparatus						Total	Rank	Apparatus						Total	Rank
Athlete	Event	F	PH	R	V	PB	HB	Total	Rank	F	PH	R	V	PB	HB	Total	Rank
Matteo Giubellini	All-around	13.800	14.233	13.233	13.900	14.500	13.400	83.066	12 Q	14.100	14.533	13.300	13.800	14.033	13.566	83.332	10
Florian Langenegger	All-around	13.633	13.633	12.933	14.433	14.166	13.100	81.898	20 Q	14.066	13.566	13.366	14.133	13.700	13.033	81.864	16
Noe Seifert	All-around	14.100	13.866	13.366	14.066	14.600	11.800	81.798	21	Did not advance							

Women

Athlete	Event	Qualification						Final					
Athlete	Event	Apparatus				Total	Rank	Apparatus				Total	Rank
Athlete	Event	V	UB	BB	F	Total	Rank	V	UB	BB	F	Total	Rank
Lena Bickel	All-around	13.366	12.266	13.066	12.433	51.131	39	Did not advance					

== Judo ==
Switzerland qualified three judokas for the following weight classes at the Games. Nils Stump (men's lightweight, 73 kg), Daniel Eich (men's half-heavyweight, 100 kg), and Binta Ndiaye (women's half-lightweight, 52 kg) qualified via quota based on IJF World Ranking List.

Athlete	Event	Round of 64	Round of 32	Round of 16	Quarterfinals	Semifinals	Repechage	Final / BM	
Athlete	Event	Opposition Result	Opposition Result	Opposition Result	Opposition Result	Opposition Result	Opposition Result	Opposition Result	Rank
Nils Stump	Men's −73 kg	—N/a	Erdenebayar (MGL); L 00–01	Did not advance					
Daniel Eich	Men's −100 kg	—N/a	Khankan (EOR); W 10–00	Elnahas (CAN); W 01–00	Sherazadishvili (ESP); W 01–00	Sulamanidze (GEO); L 00–10	Bye	Paltchik (ISR); L 00–01	5
Binta Ndiaye	Women's −52 kg	—N/a	Fiora (ARG); W 10–00	Primo (ISR); L 00–01	Did not advance				

== Modern pentathlon ==
Swiss modern pentathletes confirmed two quota places for Paris 2024, marking the country's return to the sport for the first time since Beijing 2008. Alexandre Dallenbach secured his selection in the men's event by finishing thirteenth overall in the individual rankings and among the eight highest-ranked modern pentathletes eligible for qualification at the 2023 European Games in Kraków, Poland; meanwhile Anna Jurt qualified for the games through the re-allocations of unused universality place.

Athlete	Event		Fencing (épée one touch)				Riding (show jumping)			Swimming (200 m freestyle)			Combined: shooting/running (10 m laser pistol)/(3000 m)			Total points	Final rank
Athlete	Event		RR	BR	Rank	MP points	Penalties	Rank	MP points	Time	Rank	MP points	Time	Rank	MP points	Total points	Final rank
Alexandre Dallenbach	Men's	Semifinal	21–14	0	4	230	0	1	300	1:58.28	1	314	10:34.14	15	666	1510	2 Q
Alexandre Dallenbach	Men's	Final	21–14	2	4	232	7	8	293	1:57.64	2	315	10:40.55	16	660	1500	14
Anna Jurt	Women's	Semifinal	17–18	2	8	212	14	14	286	2:29.44	17	252	11:07.63	1	633	1383	9 Q
Anna Jurt	Women's	Final	17–18	0	12	210	0	4	300	2:28.96	18	253	11:00.82	5	640	1403	11

== Rowing ==
Swiss rowers qualified boats in each of the following classes through the 2023 World Rowing Championships in Belgrade, Serbia, and the 2024 Final Qualification Regatta in Lucerne, Switzerland.

Men

Athlete	Event	Heats		Repechage		Semifinals		Final	
Athlete	Event	Time	Rank	Time	Rank	Time	Rank	Time	Rank
Raphaël Ahumada; Jan Schäuble	Lightweight double sculls	6:24.88	1 SA/B	Bye		6:24.31	2 FA	6:16.50	4
Scott Bärlocher; Dominic Condrau; Maurin Lange; Jonah Plock	Quadruple sculls	5:49.50	3 R	5:52.55	2 FA	—N/a		5:58.04	6
Andrin Gulich; Roman Röösli	Coxless pair	6:32.71	4 R	6:47.38	1 SA/B	6:32.18	2 FA	6:24.76	3rd place, bronze medalist(s)
Patrick Brunner; Tim Eric Roth; Kai Schatzle; Joel Schurch	Coxless four	6:10.86	4 R	6:00.29	5 FB	—N/a		6:02.61	9

Women

Athlete	Event	Heats		Repechage		Quarterfinals		Semifinals		Final	
Athlete	Event	Time	Rank	Time	Rank	Time	Rank	Time	Rank	Time	Rank
Aurelia-Maxima Janzen	Single sculls	7:41.15	2 QF	Bye		7:31.12	2 SA/B	7:31.65	5 FB	7:27.01	9
Celia Dupre; Lisa Lotscher; Fabienne Schweizer; Pascale Walker	Quadruple sculls	6:16.91	3 R	6:26.82	1 FA	—N/a				6:20.12	4

Qualification Legend: FA=Final A (medal); FB=Final B (non-medal); FC=Final C (non-medal); FD=Final D (non-medal); FE=Final E (non-medal); FF=Final F (non-medal); SA/B=Semifinals A/B; SC/D=Semifinals C/D; SE/F=Semifinals E/F; QF=Quarterfinals; R=Repechage

== Sailing ==
Swiss sailors qualified one boat in each of the following classes through the 2023 Sailing World Championships, the class-associated Worlds, and the continental regattas.

Elimination events

Athlete	Event	Race																	Final rank
Athlete	Event	1	2	3	4	5	6	7	8	9	10	11	12	13	QF	SF	F1	F2	Final rank
Elia Colombo	Men's iQFoil	9	7	~~22~~	6	11	10	BFD; ~~(25)~~	8	13	9	13	13	1	4	Did not advance			7
Elena Lengwiler	Women's Formula Kite	3	6	1	RDG (15.5)	1	DNS; ~~(21)~~	—N/a								SCP (2)	Did not advance		6

Medal race events

Athlete	Event	Race													Net points	Final rank
Athlete	Event	1	2	3	4	5	6	7	8	9	10	11	12	M*	Net points	Final rank
Maud Jayet	Women's ILCA6	16	4	3	8	13	17	7	8	~~23~~	—N/a			7	90	4
Sébastien Schneiter; Arno de Planta	Men's 49er	2	9	11	17	3	~~19~~	1	5	15	6	4	19	6	104	8
Yves Mermod; Maja Siegenthaler	Mixed 470	BFD; ~~(20)~~	1	14	16	4	7	1	9	—N/a				8	68	8

M = Medal race; EL = Eliminated – Did not advance into the medal race

== Shooting ==
Swiss shooters achieved quota places for the following events based on their results at the 2022 and 2023 ISSF World Championships, 2022, 2023, and 2024 European Championships, 2023 European Games, and 2024 ISSF World Olympic Qualification Tournament.

Athlete	Event	Qualification		Final	
Athlete	Event	Points	Rank	Points	Rank
Jason Solari	Men's 10 m air pistol	573	20	Did not advance	
Christoph Dürr	Men's 50 m rifle 3 positions	586	22	Did not advance	
Nina Christen	Women's 10 m air rifle	627.1	23	Did not advance	
Audrey Gogniat	Women's 10 m air rifle	632.6	3	230.3	3rd place, bronze medalist(s)
Nina Christen	Women's 50 m rifle 3 positions	582	21	Did not advance	
Chiara Leone	Women's 50 m rifle 3 positions	592	3	464.4 OR	1st place, gold medalist(s)

== Sport climbing ==
Switzerland qualified one climber for the Olympic games. Sascha Lehmann qualified for the Boulder & lead combined by finishing in the top 10 of the 2024 Olympic Qualifier Series.

Boulder & lead combined

Athlete	Event	Qualification						Final					
Athlete	Event	Boulder		Lead		Total	Rank	Boulder		Lead		Total	Rank
Athlete	Event	Result	Place	Result	Place	Total	Rank	Result	Place	Result	Place	Total	Rank
Sascha Lehmann	Men's	24.0	16	12.1	14	36.1	17	Did not advance					

== Swimming ==
Swiss swimmers achieved the entry standards in the following events for Paris 2024 (a maximum of two swimmers under the Olympic Qualifying Time (OST) and potentially at the Olympic Consideration Time (OCT)):

Athlete	Event	Heat		Semifinal		Final	
Athlete	Event	Time	Rank	Time	Rank	Time	Rank
Antonio Djakovic	Men's 200 m freestyle	1:47.46	17	Did not advance			
Antonio Djakovic	Men's 400 m freestyle	3:49.77	23	—N/a		Did not advance	
Thierry Bollin	Men's 50 m freestyle	22.95	42	Did not advance			
Thierry Bollin	Men's 100 m backstroke	54.35	26	Did not advance			
Roman Mityukov	Men's 100 m backstroke	53.94	17	Did not advance			
Roman Mityukov	Men's 200 m backstroke	1:56.62	1 Q	1:56.05	2 Q	1:54.85 NR	3rd place, bronze medalist(s)
Noè Ponti	Men's 100 m butterfly	50.65	3 Q	50.60	6 Q	50.55	4
Noè Ponti	Men's 200 m butterfly	1:54.77	3 Q	1:54.14 NR	4 Q	1:54.14	5
Jérémy Desplanches	Men's 200 m individual medley	1:58.46	9 Q	1:58.93	13	Did not advance	
Antonio Djakovic; Nils Liess; Jérémy Desplanches; Tiago Behar	Men's 4 x 200 m freestyle	7:18.06	16	—N/a		Did not advance	
Roman Mityukov; Jérémy Desplanches; Nils Liess; Antonio Djakovic	Men's 4 x 100 m medley	3:38.74	15	—N/a		Did not advance	
Lisa Mamié	Women's 100 m breaststroke	1:07.65	23	Did not advance			
Lisa Mamié	Women's 200 m breaststroke	2:26.39	17	Did not advance			

== Tennis ==
Switzerland entered two tennis players into the Olympic tournament.

Athlete	Event	Round of 64	Round of 32	Round of 16	Quarterfinals	Semifinals	Final / BM	
Athlete	Event	Opposition Score	Opposition Score	Opposition Score	Opposition Score	Opposition Score	Opposition Score	Rank
Stan Wawrinka	Men's singles	Kotov (AIN); W 6–1, 6–1	Popyrin (AUS); L 4–6, 5–7	Did not advance				
Viktorija Golubic	Women's singles	Pegula (USA); L 3–6, 4–6	Did not advance					

== Triathlon ==
Switzerland confirmed four quota places (two per gender) in the triathlon events for Paris following the release of the final mixed relay Olympic qualification ranking.

Individual

Athlete	Event	Time						Rank
Athlete	Event	Swim (1.5 km)	Trans 1	Bike (40 km)	Trans 2	Run (10 km)	Total	Rank
Adrien Briffod	Men's	21:30	22:21	1:16:51	1:17:15	1:52:21	1:52:21	49
Max Studer	Men's	22:24	23:16	1:16:52	1:17:16	1:50:07	1:50:07	40
Julie Derron	Women's	22:51	23:45	1:21:43	1:22:10	1:55:10	1:55:10	2nd place, silver medalist(s)
Cathia Schär	Women's	26:14	27:13	1:26:15	1:26:43	2:03:28	2:03:28	43

Relay

Athlete	Event	Time						Rank
Athlete	Event	Swim (300 m)	Trans 1	Bike (7 km)	Trans 2	Run (2 km)	Total group	Rank
Max Studer	Mixed relay	4:29	1:02	9:24	0:24	4:49	20:08	—N/a
Julie Derron	Mixed relay	5:08	1:10	10:29	0:25	5:32	22:44	—N/a
Sylvain Fridelance	Mixed relay	4:24	1:03	9:43	0:25	5:12	20:47	—N/a
Cathia Schär	Mixed relay	5:35	1:11	10:20	0:28	6:03	23:27	—N/a
Total	Mixed relay	—N/a					1:27:16	7

== Volleyball ==
=== Beach ===
Swiss women's pairs qualified for Paris based on the FIVB Beach Volleyball Olympic Ranking.

Athletes	Event	Preliminary round				Round of 16	Quarterfinal	Semifinal	Final / BM	
Athletes	Event	Opposition Score	Opposition Score	Opposition Score	Rank	Opposition Score	Opposition Score	Opposition Score	Opposition Score	Rank
Tanja Hüberli; Nina Brunner	Women's	Álvarez / Moreno (ESP); W 2–0 (21–12, 21–19)	Ludwig / Lippmann (GER); W 2–0 (21–9, 21–15)	Placette / Richard (FRA); W 2–0 (21–11, 21–8)	1 Q	Liliana / Paula (ESP); W 2–0 (23–21, 21–16)	Hughes / Cheng (USA); W 2–0 (21–18, 21–19)	Melissa / Brandie (CAN); L 1–2 (21–14, 20–22, 12–15)	Mariafe / Clancy (AUS); W 2–0 (21–17, 21–15)	3rd place, bronze medalist(s)
Esmée Böbner; Zoé Vergé-Dépré	Women's	Tīna / Anastasija (LAT); W 2–0 (21–15, 21–14)	Melissa / Brandie (CAN); W 2–1 (21–18, 13–21, 15–11)	Poletti / Michelle (PAR); W 2–1 (23–21, 18–21, 15–12)	1 Q	Xia / Xue (CHN); W 2–0 (29–27, 21–16)	Mariafe / Clancy (AUS); L 2–1 (19–21, 21–16, 12–15)	Did not advance		5

== See also ==
- Switzerland at the 2024 Winter Youth Olympics
