= Florian Ludwig =

German conductor

- Florian Ludwig in 2018
- Born: 1970 (age 55–56); Gerolzhofen, Bavaria, West Germany
- Education: Musikhochschule München
- Occupations: Conductor; Academic teacher
- Organizations: Mannheim National Theatre; Oper Hagen; Hochschule für Musik Detmold; Theater Gießen

Florian Ludwig (born 1970) is a German conductor focused on opera. He was music director at the Oper Hagen from 2008 to 2016, and has worked as a guest conductor internationally. He has been professor of orchestral conducting at the Hochschule für Musik Detmold since 2015.

== Life and career ==
Ludwig was born in 1970 in Gerolzhofen, Franconia, the son of Kantor Klaus Uwe Ludwig. He made music early, playing recorder and piano and singing in the church's children's choir. His father discouraged the idea of becoming a professional musician, and he first enrolled to study physics and astronomy. He then studied at the Musikhochschule München, conducting with Hermann Michael and Lied accompaniment with Helmut Deutsch, graduating with distinction in 1996. He was admitted to a master class in conducting that he completed in 1998. He worked with conductors including Colin Davis and Franz Welser-Möst. With a 1997 scholarship from the city of Munich, he studied with Wolfgang Sawallisch and the Philadelphia Orchestra. In 1997, he became conductor of the orchestra of the Konrad Adenauer Foundation, a position he held to 2008.

Ludwig was repetiteur and Kapellmeister at the Mannheim National Theatre from 1998 to 2001. He then moved to the Bremen Opera where he became Erster Kapellmeister in 2003. He was Generalmusikdirektor (GMD) at the Oper Hagen from 2008 to 2017. He promoted there a broad range of works including contemporary operas such as Barber's Vanessa and crossover projects. Their programming in the 2014/15 season was warded the prize from the Verband der Deutschen Musikverleger (German music publishers' association) for best program over a year. He conducted the world premiere of a youth opera in 2017, Tschick, after the novel and 2011 play by Wolfgang Herrndorf, with music by Ludger Vollmer. He became GMD of the Theater Gießen for two years beginning in 2020, stepping in for a vacant post.

Ludwig worked internationally as a guest conductor, including in Argentina. He appeared at the Opera Cava opera festival in Nilsiä, Finland, in 2006 with Weber's opera Der Freischütz and in 2007 with Joonas Kokkonen's The Last Temptations. He conducted Offenbach's Orpheus in der Unterwelt at the Vienna Volksoper in 2007.

He has lectured orchestral conducting at the Musikhochschule Bremen until 2008 and has been professor of orchestral conducting at the Hochschule für Musik Detmold since 2015.
