= Rowing at the 2020 Summer Olympics – Men's coxless pair =

Olympic rowing event

Men's pair at the Games of the XXXII Olympiad
- Olympic rowing
- Venue: Sea Forest Waterway
- Dates: 24–29 July 2021
- Competitors: 27 from 13 nations
- Winning time: 6:15.29

Medalists
1st place, gold medalist(s)		Martin Sinković; Valent Sinković	Croatia
2nd place, silver medalist(s)		Marius Cozmiuc; Ciprian Tudosă	Romania
3rd place, bronze medalist(s)		Frederic Vystavel; Joachim Sutton	Denmark

The men's coxless pair event at the 2020 Summer Olympics took place from 24 to 29 July 2021 at the Sea Forest Waterway. 26 rowers from 13 nations competed.

== Background ==
This was the 25th appearance of the event, which was not held at the first Games in 1896 (when bad weather forced the cancellation of all rowing events), the second games in 1900, the 1908 games, and the 1912 games.

The reigning medalists in the event were New Zealand, South Africa, and Italy. All 3 qualified to the competition.

== Qualification ==
Each National Olympic Committee (NOC) was limited to a single boat (one rower) in the event since 1912. There were 13 qualifying places in the men's double sculls:

- 11 from the 2019 World Championship
- 2 from the final qualification regatta

== Competition format ==
This rowing event is a coxless pair event, meaning that each boat is propelled by two rowers. The "coxless" portion means that there is no coxswain. Each rower has one oar. The course uses the 2000 metres distance that became the Olympic standard in 1912.

During the first round three heats were held. The first three boats in each heat advanced to the semifinals, with the others relegated to the repechage.

The repechage offered rowers a second chance to qualify for the semifinals. Placing in the repechage determined which semifinal the boat would race in. The top three boats in the repechage moved on to the semifinals, with the remaining boats being eliminated.

Two semifinals were held, each with 6 boats. The top three boats from each heat advanced to Final A and competed for a medal. The remaining boats advanced to Final B.

The third and final round was the finals. Each final determined a set of rankings. The A final determined the medals, along with the rest of the places through 6th, while the B final gave rankings from 7th to 12th.

== Schedule ==
The competition was held over six days.

All times are Japan Standard Time (UTC+9)

Date	Time	Round
Saturday, 24 July 2021	9:50	Heats
Sunday, 25 July 2021	9:40	Repechage
Wednesday, 28 July 2021	12:00	Semifinals A/B
Thursday, 29 July 2021	8:30	Final B
Thursday, 29 July 2021	9:18	Final A

== Results ==
=== Heats ===
The first three of each heat qualified for the semifinals, while the remainder went to the repechage.

==== Heat 1 ====
Rank	Lane	Rower	Nation	Time	Notes
1	4	Marius Cozmiuc; Ciprian Tudosă	Romania	6:33.86	Q
2	3	Niki van Sprang; Guillaume Krommenhoek	Netherlands	6:36.42	Q
3	2	Martin Mačković; Miloš Vasić	Serbia	6:43.18	Q
4	5	Jaime Canalejo Pazos; Javier García Ordóñez	Spain	6:53.33	R
5	1	Luc Daffarn; Jake Green	South Africa	7:04.03	R

==== Heat 2 ====
Rank	Lane	Rower	Nation	Time	Notes
1	3	Sam Hardy; Joshua Hicks	Australia	6:42.74	Q
2	2	Giovanni Abagnale; Marco di Costanzo	Italy	6:48.74	Q
3	1	Brook Robertson; Stephen Jones	New Zealand	6:56.53	Q
4	4	Thibaud Turlan; Guillaume Turlan	France	7:09.79	R

==== Heat 3 ====
Rank	Lane	Rower	Nation	Time	Notes
1	3	Martin Sinković; Valent Sinković	Croatia	6:32.41	Q
2	4	Frederic Vystavel; Joachim Sutton	Denmark	6:36.93	Q
3	2	Kai Langerfeld; Conlin McCabe	Canada	6:40.99	Q
4	1	Dzmitry Furman; Siarhei Valadzko	Belarus	7:05.65	R

=== Repechage ===
The first three pairs in the repechage qualified for the semifinals, while the fourth pair was eliminated.

Rank	Lane	Rower	Nation	Time	Notes
1	2	Jaime Canalejo Pazos; Javier García Ordóñez	Spain	6:47.06	Q
2	3	Thibaud Turlan; Guillaume Turlan	France	6:49.19	Q
3	1	Dzmitry Furman; Siarhei Valadzko	Belarus	6:52.82	Q
4	4	Luc Daffarn; Jake Green	South Africa	6:57.01	

=== Semifinals ===
==== Semifinal A/B 1 ====
Rank	Lane	Rower	Nation	Time	Notes
1	4	Marius Cozmiuc; Ciprian Tudosă	Romania	6:13.51	FA
2	5	Frederic Vystavel; Joachim Sutton	Denmark	6:14.88	FA
3	6	Jaime Canalejo Pazos; Javier García Ordóñez	Spain	6:16.25	FA
4	3	Sam Hardy; Joshua Hicks	Australia	6:19.30	FB
5	1	Dzmitry Furman; Siarhei Valadzko	Belarus	6:30.66	FB
6	2	Brook Robertson; Stephen Jones	New Zealand	6:41.46	FB

==== Semifinal A/B 2 ====
Rank	Lane	Rower	Nation	Time	Notes
1	4	Martin Sinković; Valent Sinković	Croatia	6:15.63	FA
2	6	Martin Mačković; Miloš Vasić	Serbia	6:17.47	FA
3	2	Kai Langerfeld; Conlin McCabe	Canada	6:19.15	FA
4	3	Niki van Sprang; Guillaume Krommenhoek	Netherlands	6:19.57	FB
5	5	Giovanni Abagnale; Vincenzo Abbagnale	Italy	6:20.29	FB
6	1	Thibaud Turlan; Guillaume Turlan	France	6:52.24	FB

=== Finals ===
==== Final B ====
Rank	Lane	Rower	Nation	Time	Notes
7	4	Niki van Sprang; Guillaume Krommenhoek	Netherlands	6:22.75	
8	5	Dzmitry Furman; Siarhei Valadzko	Belarus	6:25.88	
9	6	Thibaud Turlan; Guillaume Turlan	France	6:28.01	
10	3	Sam Hardy; Joshua Hicks	Australia	6:30.20	
11	2	Giovanni Abagnale; Vincenzo Abbagnale	Italy	6:31.43	
12	1	Brook Robertson; Stephen Jones	New Zealand	6:38.30	

==== Final A ====
Rank	Lane	Rower	Nation	Time	Notes
1st place, gold medalist(s)	3	Martin Sinković; Valent Sinković	Croatia	6:15.29	
2nd place, silver medalist(s)	4	Marius Cozmiuc; Ciprian Tudosă	Romania	6:16.58	
3rd place, bronze medalist(s)	5	Frederic Vystavel; Joachim Sutton	Denmark	6:19.88	
4	1	Kai Langerfeld; Conlin McCabe	Canada	6:20.43	
5	2	Martin Mačković; Miloš Vasić	Serbia	6:22.34	
6	6	Jaime Canalejo Pazos; Javier García Ordóñez	Spain	6:25.25	
