= Benjamin Taylor (rower) =

New Zealand rower (born 1999)

Ben Taylor
Personal information
- Full name: Benjamin Taylor
- Born: 20 October 1999 (age 27)

Sport
- Sport: Rowing
Medal record
Men's rowing
Representing New Zealand
World Championships
Gold medal – first place	2025 Shanghai	Coxless pair
Gold medal – first place	2026 Amsterdam	Coxless pair
Bronze medal – third place	2025 Shanghai	Mixed eight

Benjamin Taylor (born 20 October 1999) is a New Zealand rower. He won the gold medal at the 2025 and 2026 World Rowing Championships in the men's coxless pair.

== Career ==
Taylor began rowing in 2013 at St Andrew's College and Avon Rowing Club in Christchurch. He was a silver medalist in the men’s coxless four at the 2017 World Rowing Junior Championships in Lithuania. In 2018, he was a silver medalist at the 2018 World Rowing U23 Championships in Poznań in the coxed fours. He was a silver medalist again at the 2019 World Rowing U23 Championships in the coxless four and later that year, competed for New Zealand at the senior the 2019 World Rowing Championships in Ottensheim, Austria.

Taylor took a two-year break from rowing and competed in rugby union as well as undergoing an apprenticeship in building work.

After returning to rowing, Taylor was paired with Phillip Wilson in 2023 and they qualified the boat for the 2024 Paris Olympics, but prior to the Games he was replaced in the boat by Dan Williamson. In 2025 he began rowing alongside Oli Welch, a fellow member of Avon Rowing Club, to great effect; They won the Varese World Cup event in June in their first regatta together, beating the Croatian 2024 Olympic Games gold medallists Valent Sinković and Martin Sinković. They then had a second place finish in the World Cup Lucerne event two weeks later.

In September 2025, Taylor and Welch won the gold medal at the 2025 World Rowing Championships in Shanghai, China, in the men's coxless pair. It was the first gold medal for New Zealand in the event since Hamish Bond and Eric Murray in 2015. In August 2026, Welch and Taylor retained their title at the 2026 World Rowing Championships, winning the gold medal in the coxless pair in Amsterdam.
