= Angus Dawson =

Australian rower (born 2000)

Personal information
- Born: 30 October 2000 (age 25) Bedford Park, South Australia, Australia
- Home town: Dingabledinga, South Australia
- Education: St Peter's College, Adelaide; UC Berkeley
- Years active: 2017–
- Height: 1.93 m (6 ft 4 in)
- Weight: 99 kg (218 lb)

Sport
- Country: Australia
- Sport: Rowing
- Events: Men's eight (M8+); Men's coxed four (M4+)
- Club: Adelaide Rowing Club
- Coached by: Mark Prater, Rhett Ayliffe

Achievements and titles
- Olympic finals: Tokyo 2020 M8+
- National finals: King's Cup 2019 & 2021; M2- Aust Champion 2021
Medal record
Men's rowing
Representing Australia
World Championships
Silver medal – second place	2026 Amsterdam	Coxless pair
Bronze medal – third place	2023 Belgrade	Eight
U23 World Championships
Gold medal – first place	2019 Sarasota	M4+
Bronze medal – third place	2022 Varese	M8+

Angus Dawson (born 30 October 2000) is an Australian representative rower. He is an Australian national champion and twice an U23 world champion (in 2019 and 2022). He was a 2021 Tokyo Olympian where he rowed in the Australian men's eight.

== Club and state rowing ==
Raised in rural South Australia at Dingabledinga, Dawson was schooled at St Peter's College where he took up rowing. His senior club rowing started from the Adelaide Rowing Club.

Dawson's state representative debut for South Australia came in 2017 when still aged sixteen he was selected in the state youth eight to contest the Noel Wilkinson trophy at the Interstate Regatta. He was again selected in the South Australian youth eight in 2018. That year he won an U19 national title in the double scull with Mitchell Reinhard. In 2019 he was selected in the South Australian men's senior eight to contest the Kings Cup.

In 2020 Dawson studied at UC Berkeley and rowed in the Berkeley varsity eight. He returned to Australia due to Covid concerns and entered the Australian senior men's squad. In 2021 he again rowed in the South Australian King's Cup eight and that year he won an open men's coxless pair national championship title with his South Australian team-mate Alexander Hill.

== International representative rowing ==
Dawson made his Australian representative debut at the 2019 World Rowing U23 Championships in Sarasota-Bradenton, USA when he was selected in the two seat of the Australian coxed four which rowed to victory and a world championship gold medal.

Following his return to Australia in 2021 and before national team selections for the delayed Tokyo Olympics, Dawson had forced his way into the Australian men's eight, which had qualified for the Olympics on 2019 international performances. In Tokyo the Australian men's eight placed fourth in their heat, fourth in the repêchage and sixth in the Olympic A final. The Australian men's eight finished 8.27 seconds behind fifth place with a disappointing performance for the crew, well off the pace of the rest of the crews in the race.

In March 2022 Dawson was selected into the men's sweep squad for the 2022 international season and the 2022 World Rowing Championships. Leading up to the 2022 World Rowing U23 Championships Dawson stroked the U23 men's eight competing as an Australia 2 crew at the World Rowing Cup III in Lucerne. Two weeks later in that crew he won a bronze medal at the U23 World Championships in Varese.

In March 2023 Dawson was again selected in the Australian senior men's sweep-oar squad for the 2023 international season. At the Rowing World Cup II in Varese, Italy Dawson raced as Australia's 2- entrant with Jack O'Brien. They finished 3rd in the A final to win the bronze medal. At 2023's RWC III in Lucerne, Dawson and O'Brien were selected into the Australian men's eight. In the final the Australian eight rowed stroke for stroke with their fancied Great Britain rivals but then moved away at the 1000m mark and held on for an upset gold medal victory. For the 2023 World Rowing Championships in Belgrade Serbia, the Australian men's eight was left unchanged and Dawson again raced in the seven seat. They won their heat powering past the USA eight who had headed them at the 1000m mark. In the A final Australia and Great Britain traded the lead over the first 1000m, but beyond that point the result mirrored that of 2022 with Great Britain exerting dominance by the 1500m, fighting off a fast finishing Dutch eight who took silver and leaving the Australians with the bronze for the second successive year.
