= Oliver Welch =

New Zealand rower (born 2003)

Oli Welch
Personal information
- Full name: Oliver Welch
- Born: 20 July 2003 (age 23)

Sport
- Sport: Rowing
Medal record
Men's rowing
Representing New Zealand
World Championships
Gold medal – first place	2025 Shanghai	Coxless pair
Gold medal – first place	2026 Amsterdam	Coxless pair
Bronze medal – third place	2025 Shanghai	Mixed eight

Oli Welch (born 20 July 2003) is a New Zealand rower. He won the gold medal at the 2025 and 2026 World Rowing Championships in the men's coxless pair.

== Career ==
Welch began rowing whilst he was studying at Auckland Grammar School, later joining West End Rowing Club in Auckland and in 2022, he joined Avon Rowing Club in Christchurch after starting a Financial Engineering undergraduate degree at the University of Canterbury.

In 2024, Welch and Josh Vodanovich won the gold medal in the men’s pair at the 2024 World Rowing U23 Championships in St. Catharines, Canada. Welch won four titles at the New Zealand Rowing Championships in February 2025, winning the under-22 coxless pair event with Cody Johnson, as well all helping Avon Rowing Club win the pairs, fours, and eights.

Later that year, he began rowing alongside Benjamin Taylor, a fellow member of Avon Rowing Club. They won their first regatta as a pair at the Varese World Cup event in June 2025, claiming a notable victory over the Croatian 2024 Olympic Games gold medallists Valent and Martin Sinkovic. They then had a second place finish in the World Cup Lucerne event two weeks later. In September 2025, Welch made his debut at the senior World Championships, winning gold with Taylor in Shanghai, China, in the men's coxless pair. It was the first gold medal for New Zealand in the event since the retirements of Hamish Bond and Eric Murray the decade before.

In August 2026, Welch and Taylor retained their title at the 2026 World Rowing Championships, winning the gold medal in the coxless pair in Amsterdam.
