= Andrin Gulich =

Swiss rower (born 1999)

Personal information
- Nationality: Swiss
- Born: 9 March 1999 (age 27)
- Height: 1.93 m (6 ft 4 in)

Sport
- Sport: Rowing
Medal record
Olympic Games
Bronze medal – third place	2024 Paris	Coxless pair
World Championships
Gold medal – first place	2023 Belgrade	Coxless pair
European Championships
Gold medal – first place	2023 Bled	Coxless pair
Bronze medal – third place	2024 Szeged	Coxless pair

Andrin Gulich (born 9 March 1999) is a Swiss rower. He competed in the 2020 Summer Olympics. Together with Roman Röösli, he won the gold medal in the coxless pair competition at the 2023 World Rowing Championships and the bronze medal at the 2024 Summer Olympics in Paris.
