= Oliver Bub =

American rower (born 1998)

Personal information
- Nationality: American
- Born: 16 April 1998 (age 28)

Sport
- Country: United States
- Sport: Rowing
- Event: Coxless pair

Oliver Bub (born 16 April 1998) is an American rower. He competed at the 2024 Summer Olympics.

== Early life ==
Bub is originally from Westport, Connecticut. He has a rowing family and both of his parents rowed at Boston University. He attended Dartmouth College.

== Career ==
Alongside Billy Bender, he won the men's pair at the U.S. Olympic & Paralympic team trials in Sarasota, Florida.

They competed at the 2024 Paris Olympics in the men's pairs, where they reached the semi final.

== Personal life ==
His father Stephan Bub is originally from Germany and met his mother Mary-Beth at Boston University in New England.
