= Luke Gadsdon =

Canadian rower

Personal information
- Born: May 5, 1997 (age 29) Hamilton, Ontario, Canada
- Height: 193 cm (6 ft 4 in)
- Weight: 91 kg (201 lb)

Sport
- Country: Canada
- Sport: Rowing

Luke Gadsdon (born May 5, 1997) is a Canadian rower.

== Career ==
In May 2021, Gadsdon competed in the men's fours event at the Final Olympic qualification tournament, finishing in second place and qualifying for the 2020 Summer Olympics. In June 2021, Gadsdon was named to Canada's 2020 Olympic team.
