= Billy Bender =

American rower (born 2001)

Personal information
- Full name: William Bender
- Nationality: American
- Born: 9 June 2001 (age 25)

Sport
- Country: United States
- Sport: Rowing
- Event: Coxless pair
Medal record
Men's rowing
Representing United States
World Championships
Bronze medal – third place	2025 Shanghai	Eight

William Bender (born 9 June 2001) is an American rower. He competed at the 2024 Paris Olympics.

== Early life ==
From Norwich, Vermont, he attended Hanover High School and Dartmouth College. He won bronze at the 2021 IRA National Championships and all-American honours at Dartmouth. He competed internationally for the United States at under-23 level.

== Career ==
Bender placed fifth at the 2023 World Rowing Championships in Serbia in the men's coxless pair with Evan Olson.

He won the men's pairs at the 2023 US Rowing Senior National Team Trials alongside Oliver Bub.

He competed at the 2024 Summer Olympics alongside Bub in the men's pairs, where they reached the semi final.

At the 2025 World Rowing Championships in Shanghai, he was part of the United States team that won bronze medal in the men's eight.
