= Hagen Theatre =

Theatre in Germany

Coordinates: 51°21′30″N 7°28′00″E

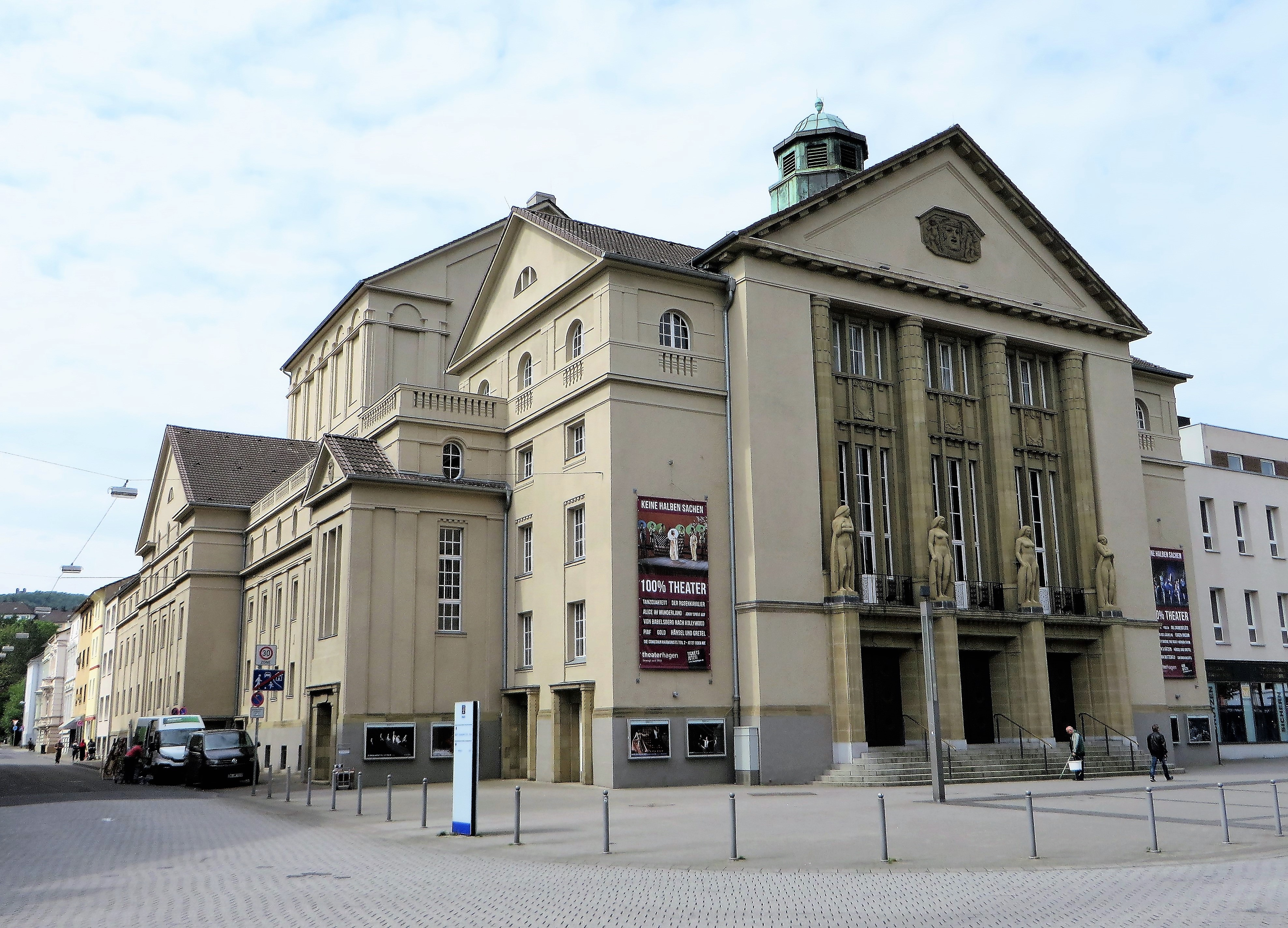
Hagen Theatre (2016)

Hagen Theatre (German: Theater Hagen) is a performance venue in Hagen, North Rhine-Westphalia, Germany. It offers musical theatre (opera, operetta, musicals), ballet, plays, children's and young people's theatre, and concerts by the Philharmonic Orchestra Hagen.

== Promoting remembrance culture and stance against antisemitism ==
Theater Hagen. (Ge-)Denkwoche. 04.11.2026. Theater Hagen organized from November 3rd to November 9th, 2026 "(Ge-)Denkwoche - Aus dem Dunkeln ein Licht - מאפלה לאוֹר". Reichspogromnacht Remembrance Week at the Theater Hagen and other venues of the city of Hagen, Nordrhein Westfalen, FRG. On the photo: KAMMERMUSIKABEND. AUS DEM DUNKELN EIN LICHT / CHAMBER MUSIC EVENING. A LIGHT FROM DARKNESS / – מאפלה לאוֹר Works by Gideon Klein and Jake Heggie with Nike Tiecke (soprano) and members of the Hagen Philharmonic Orchestra. Theater Hagen (Lutz). Wed., Nov. 4, 2026

"Block 10" movie in "(Ge-)Denkwoche Aus dem Dunkeln ein Licht – מאפלה לאוֹר". Reichspogromnacht Remembrance Week in the city of Hagen. Organized by the Theater Hagen. City of Hagen, Nordrhein Westfalen, FRG. Discussion after screening Block 10 movie in CineStar movie theater in Hagen. From left to right: Søren Schuhmacher - director of the Theater Hagen; Hagay Feldheim - chairman of the Jewish Community of Hagen; Marcus O. Rosenmüller - director of "Block 10"; Alice Brauner - screenwriter and producer; Moritz Führmann - actor. November 8th, 2026. CineStar movie theater. Hagen, Nordrhein Westfalen, FRG.
