= Roman Röösli =

Swiss rower (born 1993)

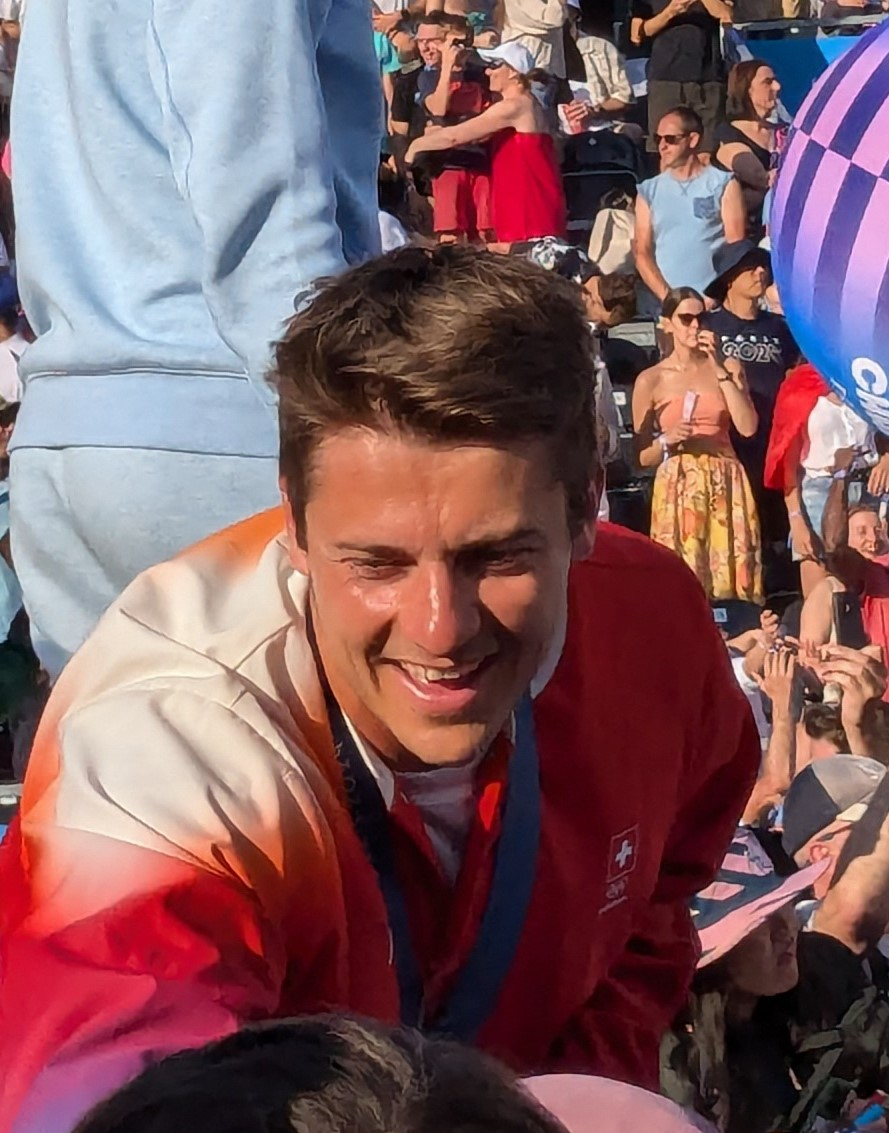
- Roman Röösli during the 2024 Summer Olympics.

Personal information
- Nationality: Swiss
- Born: 22 September 1993 (age 32) Neuenkirch, Switzerland
- Height: 1.91 m (6 ft 3 in)
- Weight: 87 kg (192 lb)

Sport
- Country: Switzerland
- Sport: Rowing
Medal record
Men's rowing
Representing Switzerland
Olympic Games
Bronze medal – third place	2024 Paris	Coxless pair
World Championships
Gold medal – first place	2023 Belgrade	Coxless pair
Silver medal – second place	2018 Plovdiv	Double sculls
European Championships
Gold medal – first place	2023 Bled	Coxless pair
Silver medal – second place	2019 Lucerne	Double sculls
Silver medal – second place	2020 Poznań	Double sculls
Bronze medal – third place	2017 Račice	Double sculls
Bronze medal – third place	2018 Glasgow	Single sculls
Bronze medal – third place	2024 Szeged	Coxless pair

Roman Röösli (born 22 September 1993) is a Swiss rower. He competed in the men's quadruple sculls event at the 2016 Summer Olympics and in the men's double sculls at the 2020 Summer Olympics. Together with Andrin Gulich, he won the gold medal in the coxless pair competition at the 2023 World Rowing Championships and the bronze medal at the 2024 Summer Olympics in Paris.
