= Marius Cozmiuc =

Romanian rower (born 1992)

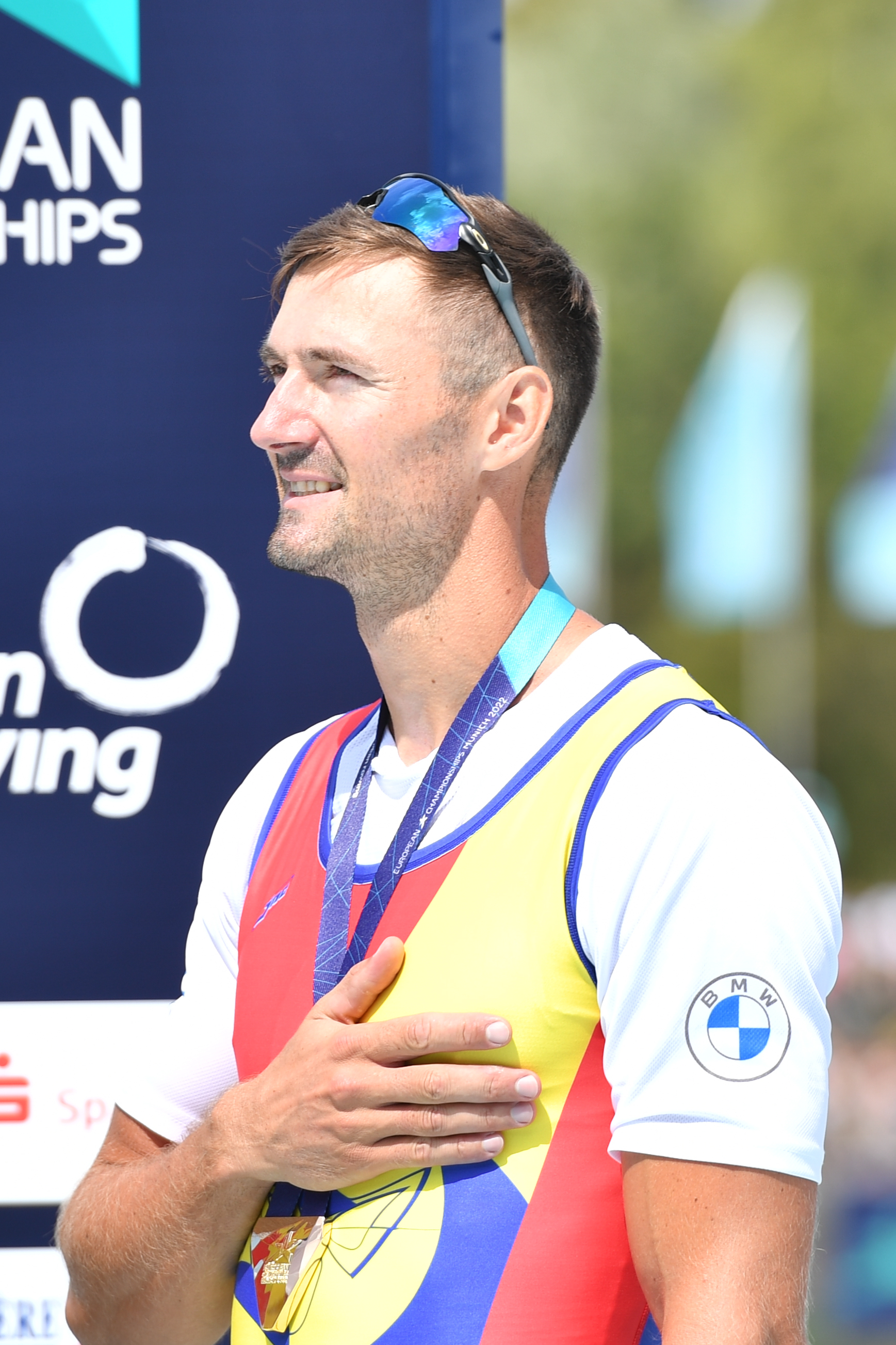
- Cozmiuc in 2022

Personal information
- Full name: Marius Vasile Cozmiuc
- Born: 7 September 1992 (age 33) Suceava, Romania
- Education: Valahia University of Târgoviște
- Height: 198 cm (6 ft 6 in)
- Spouse: Ionela-Livia Cozmiuc

Sport
- Sport: Rowing
- Club: CS Dinamo Bucuresti
- Coached by: Antonio Colamonici; Dorin Alupei
Medal record
Men's rowing
Representing Romania
Olympic Games
Silver medal – second place	2020 Tokyo	Coxless pair
World Championships
Gold medal – first place	2022 Račice	Coxless pair
Silver medal – second place	2018 Plovdiv	Coxless pair
European Championships
Gold medal – first place	2020 Poznań	Coxless pair
Gold medal – first place	2022 Munich	Coxless pair
Silver medal – second place	2012 Varese	Coxless four
Silver medal – second place	2013 Seville	Coxless four
Silver medal – second place	2017 Račice	Coxless four
Silver medal – second place	2019 Lucerne	Coxless pair
Silver medal – second place	2023 Bled	Eight
Bronze medal – third place	2018 Glasgow	Coxless pair

Marius Vasile Cozmiuc (born 7 September 1992) is a Romanian rower. A 2022 World Champion in the coxless pair, Cozmiuc competed in a coxless four at the 2016 Summer Olympics and won a silver medal in the coxless pair at Tokyo 2020. He married fellow Olympic rower Ionela-Livia Cozmiuc in 2017.

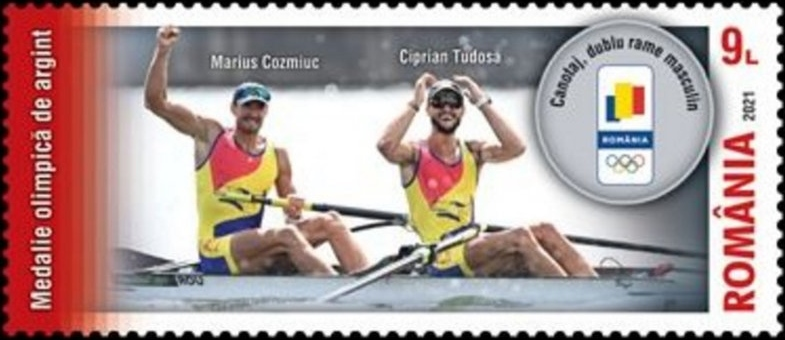
Cozmiuc (left) at the 2020 Summer Olympics
