= Theater Gießen =

Coordinates: 50.5841°N 8.6773°E

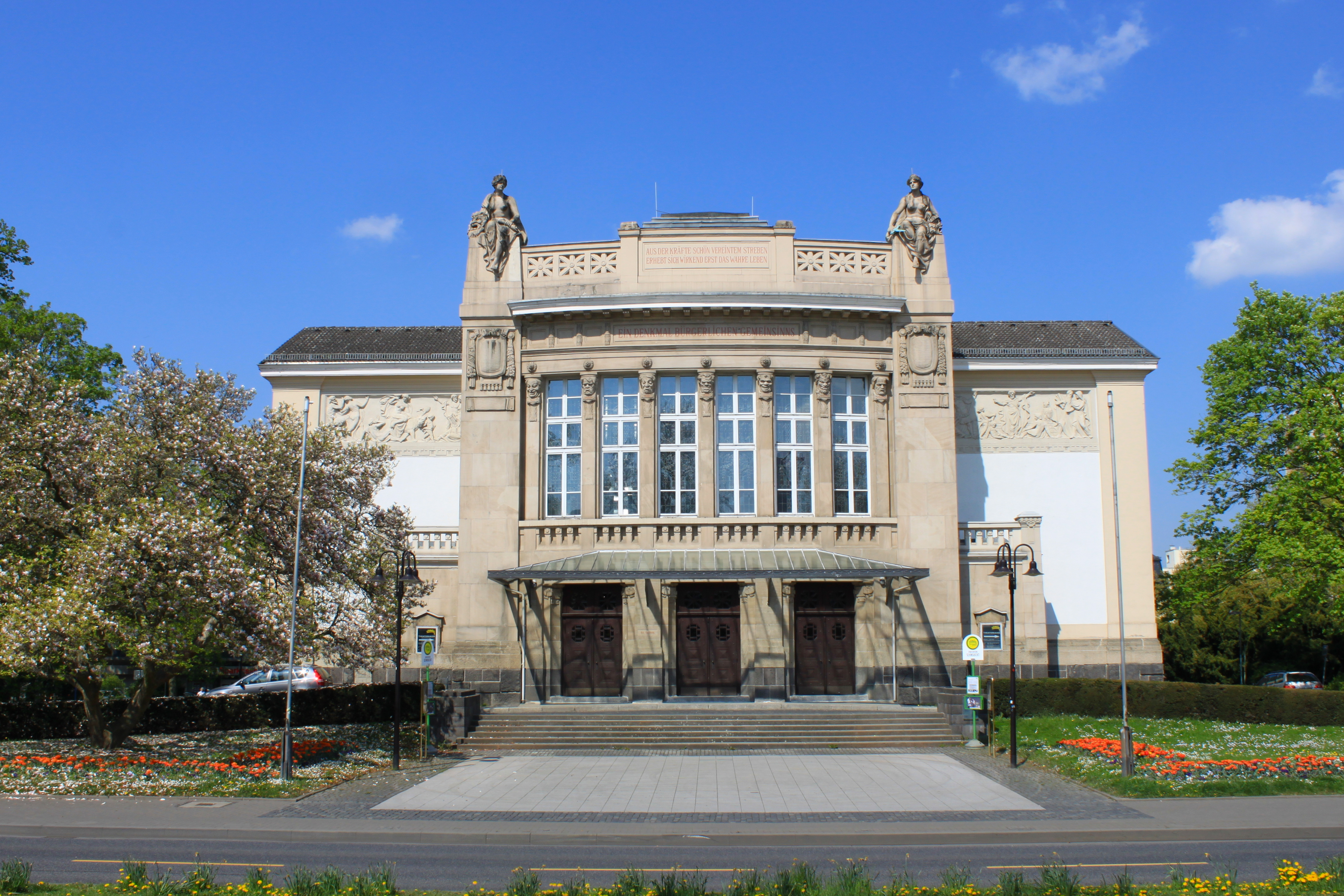
Front of the theatre building, 2011

The Theater Gießen, official name Stadttheater Gießen (Gießen Municipal Theatre), is a theatre in Gießen, Germany, a cultural center for the university city and the region. The main building was designed in Neo-classical style with influences of Jugendstil by architects Fellner & Helmer and completed in 1906. It has two stages, seats around 700 visitors and presents opera, musical, operetta, plays and modern dance theatre.

== Literature ==
- Dieter Zöchling: Opernhäuser in Deutschland, Österreich und der Schweiz. Geschichte, Ereignisse, Interpreten. Düsseldorf 1983, ISBN 3-612-10023-8.
- Hans-Christoph Hoffmann: Die Theaterbauten von Fellner und Helmer. München 1966, ISBN 3-7913-0128-4.
- Hans Meyer (ed.): Das neue Stadttheater in Gießen. Denkschrift zur Feier der Eröffnung. Roth, Gießen o.J. [1907].
- Jo Straeten u.a.: Stadttheater Gießen. Festschrift zum 75 jährigen Bestehen. Stadttheater Gießen, Gießen 1982.
- Jost Hermand (ed.): Jugendstil. Darmstadt 1992, ISBN 3-534-03463-5.
- Magistrat der Universitätsstadt Gießen (ed.): [Ludwig Brake, Eckhard Ehlers, Friedhelm Häring]: Theater vor dem Theater; zur Geschichte des Theaterspiels in Gießen. Begleitheft zur Ausstellung vom 11. Mai bis 6. Juni 2007 im Stadttheater Gießen, Eigenverlag Stadt Gießen, Gießen 2007.
- Manfred Godehardt: Gießen 2007 – Ein baukulturelles Jubiläumsjahr (2) - 100 Jahre Stadttheater Gießen, 13. August 2012
- Stadttheater Gießen (Hrsg.): 100 Jahre Stadttheater Gießen. Eigenverlag, Gießen 2007. ISBN 978-3-9811711-5-0.
