= Béla Simon =

Hungarian rower

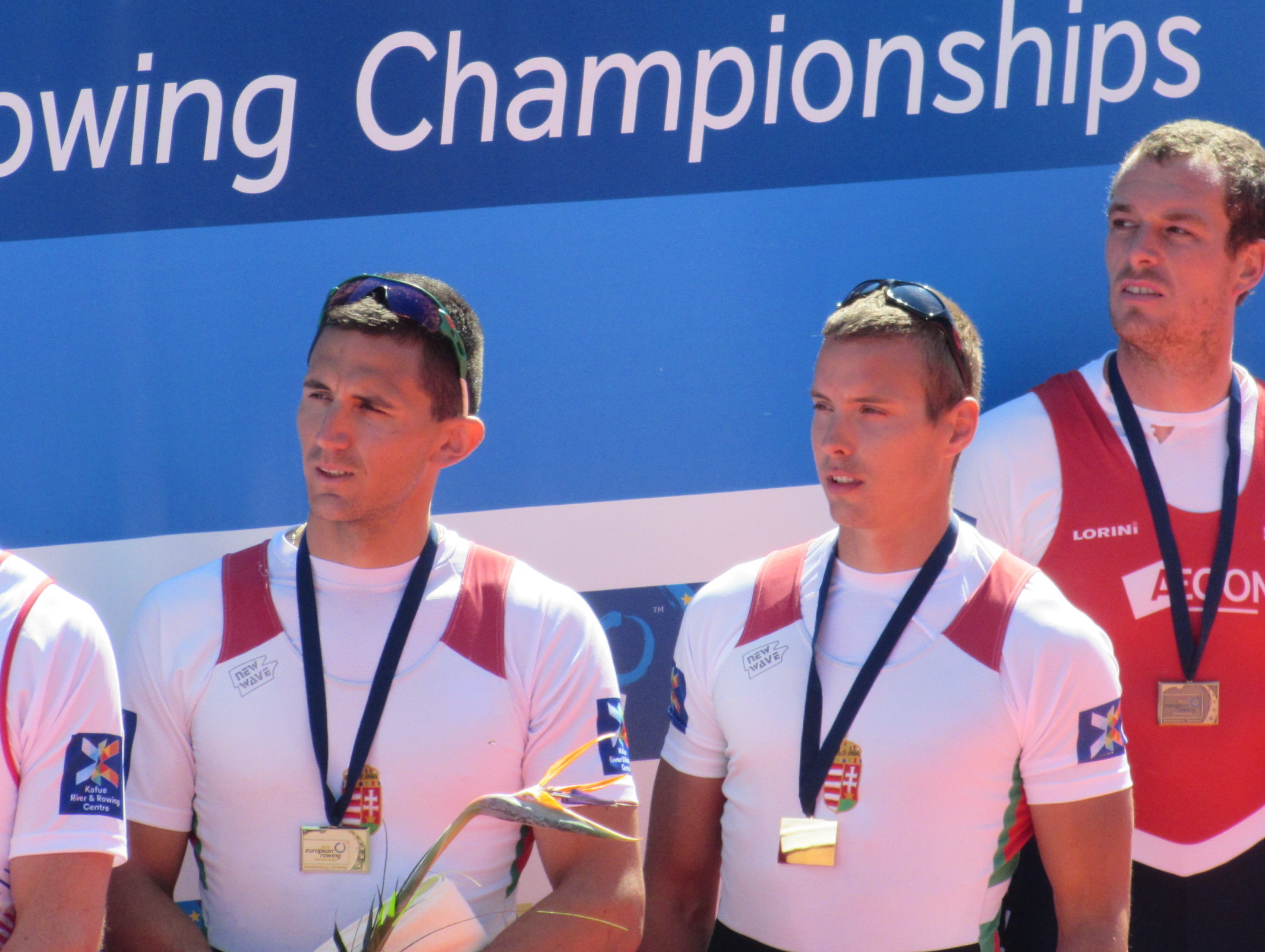

Personal information
- Born: 4 August 1988 (age 37) Szolnok, Hungary
- Height: 1.91 m (6 ft 3 in)
- Weight: 94 kg (207 lb)

Sport
- Country: Hungary
- Sport: Rowing
- Event: Men's pair
- Club: Tisza Evezős Egylet, Szolnok
Medal record
Men's rowing
Representing Hungary
World Championships
Gold medal – first place	2017 Sarasota	Coxed pair
European Championships
Gold medal – first place	2016 Brandenburg	Coxless pair

Béla Simon (born 4 August 1988) is a Hungarian rower. He competed at the 2012 Summer Olympics in London in the Men's Pair event together with his teammate Domonkos Széll. They were eliminated in the repechage round.

He competed in the same event at the 2016 Summer Olympics with Adrián Juhász, reaching the B final. The pair won the event at the 2016 European Championships. The pair also won the silver medal at the 2009 World Under 23 Championships.
