= Florin Arteni =

Romanian rower

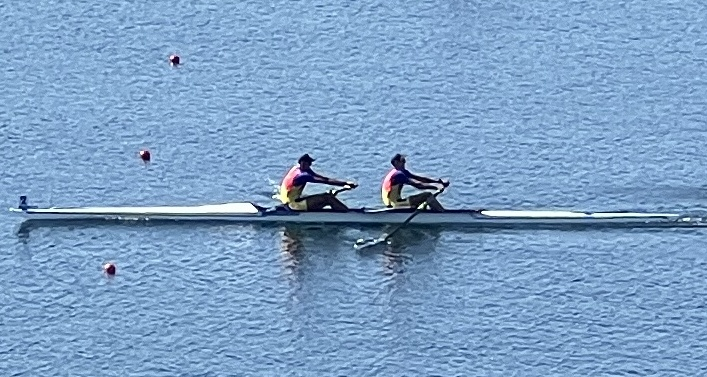
- Arteni (left) alongside Florin Lehaci at the 2024 Summer Olympics

Personal information
- Full name: Florin Nicolae Arteni-Fîntînariu
- Nationality: Romanian
- Born: 6 March 2001 (age 25) Suceava, Romania

Sport
- Sport: Rowing
Medal record
Men's rowing
Representing Romania
World Championships
Gold medal – first place	2025 Shanghai	Mixed eight
Silver medal – second place	2025 Shanghai	Coxless pair
European Championships
Gold medal – first place	2025 Plovdiv	Coxless pair
Gold medal – first place	2026 Varese	Eight
Silver medal – second place	2023 Bled	Eight
Silver medal – second place	2024 Szeged	Coxless pair
Bronze medal – third place	2024 Szeged	Eight
Summer Youth Olympics
Silver medal – second place	2018 Buenos Aires	Coxless pair
World Junior Championships
Gold medal – first place	2018 Račice	Coxless pair
Gold medal – first place	2019 Tokyo	Coxless pair

Florin Nicolae Arteni-Fîntînariu (born 6 March 2001) is a Romanian rower. He competed in the men's eight event at the 2020 Summer Olympics.
