= Sergiu Bejan =

Romanian rower (born 1996)

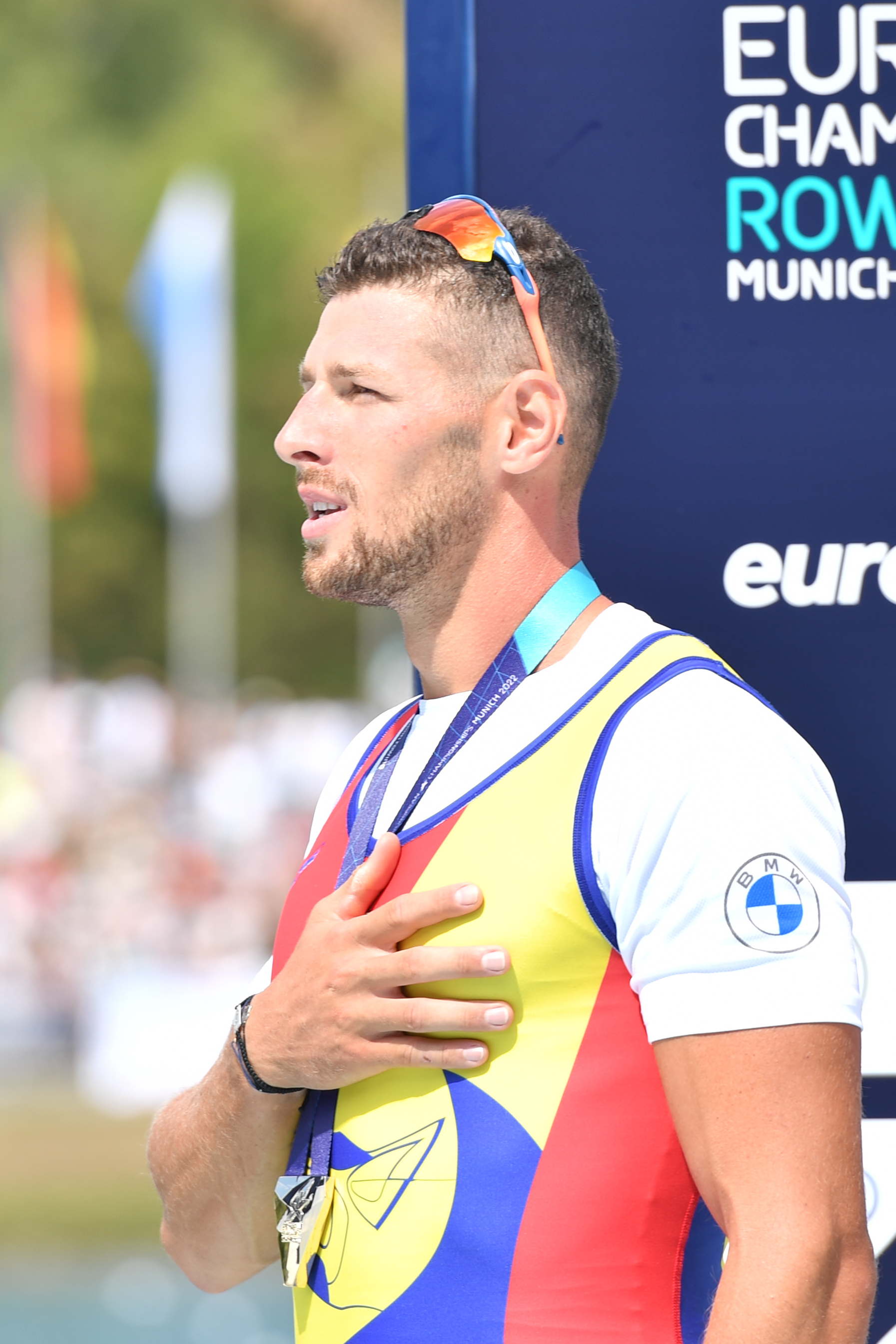

Personal information
- Full name: Sergiu Vasile Bejan
- Nationality: Romanian
- Born: 18 November 1996 (age 29) Suceava, Romania

Sport
- Sport: Rowing
Medal record
Men's rowing
Representing Romania
World Championships
Gold medal – first place	2022 Račice	Coxless pair
Silver medal – second place	2025 Shanghai	Coxless four
European Championships
Gold medal – first place	2022 Munich	Coxless pair
Gold medal – first place	2025 Plovdiv	Coxless four
Gold medal – first place	2026 Varese	Eight
Bronze medal – third place	2018 Glasgow	Eight
Silver medal – second place	2020 Poznań	Eight
Silver medal – second place	2021 Varese	Eight
Silver medal – second place	2023 Bled	Eight
Bronze medal – third place	2024 Szeged	Eight
World Junior Championships
Silver medal – second place	2014 Hamburg	Coxless four

Sergiu Vasile Bejan (born 18 November 1996) is a Romanian rower. A 2022 World Champion in the coxless pair, he also competed in the men's eight event at the 2020 Summer Olympics.
