= Florin Lehaci =

Romanian rower (born 1999)

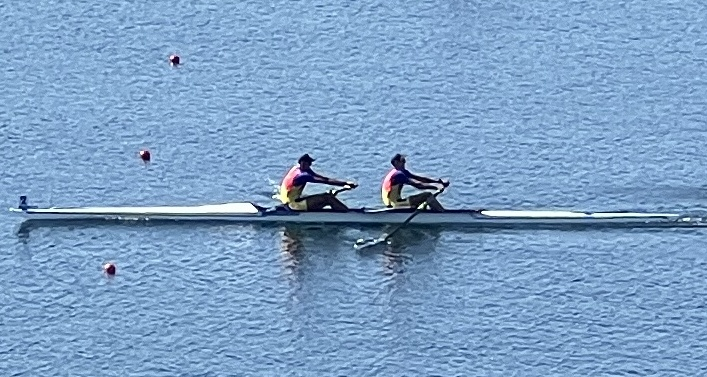
- Lehaci (right) alongside Florin Arteni at the 2024 Summer Olympics

Personal information
- Full name: Florin Sorin Lehaci
- Nationality: Romanian
- Born: 26 March 1999 (age 27) Câmpulung, Romania
- Spouse: Maria Tivodariu (m. 2023)

Sport
- Sport: Rowing
Medal record
Men's rowing
Representing Romania
World Championships
Gold medal – first place	2025 Shanghai	Mixed eight
Gold medal – first place	2026 Amsterdam	Mixed eight
Silver medal – second place	2025 Shanghai	Coxless pair
World U23 Championships
Gold medal – first place	2019 Sarasota	Coxless pair
Silver medal – second place	2018 Poznań	Coxless pair
World Junior Championships
Silver medal – second place	2017 Trakai	Coxless pair
European Championships
Gold medal – first place	2025 Plovdiv	Coxless pair
Gold medal – first place	2026 Varese	Coxless pair
Gold medal – first place	2026 Varese	Mixed eight
Silver medal – second place	2018	Eight
Silver medal – second place	2020 Poznań	Eight
Silver medal – second place	2021 Varese	Eight
Silver medal – second place	2023 Bled	Eight
Silver medal – second place	2024 Szeged	Coxless pair
Bronze medal – third place	2022 Oberschleißheim	Coxless four
Bronze medal – third place	2024 Szeged	Eight

Florin Sorin Lehaci (born 26 March 1999) is a Romanian rower. He competed in the men's eight event at the 2020 Summer Olympics.
