= Dzmitry Furman =

Belarusian rower

Dmitry Furman
Personal information
- Nationality: Belarus
- Born: 9 July 1990 (age 34); Mikashevichy, Belarus

Sport
- Sport: Rowing

Dzmitry Furman (born 9 July 1990) is a Belarusian rower. He competed in the 2020 Summer Olympics.
