= Nelson Ritsema =

Dutch rower (born 1994)

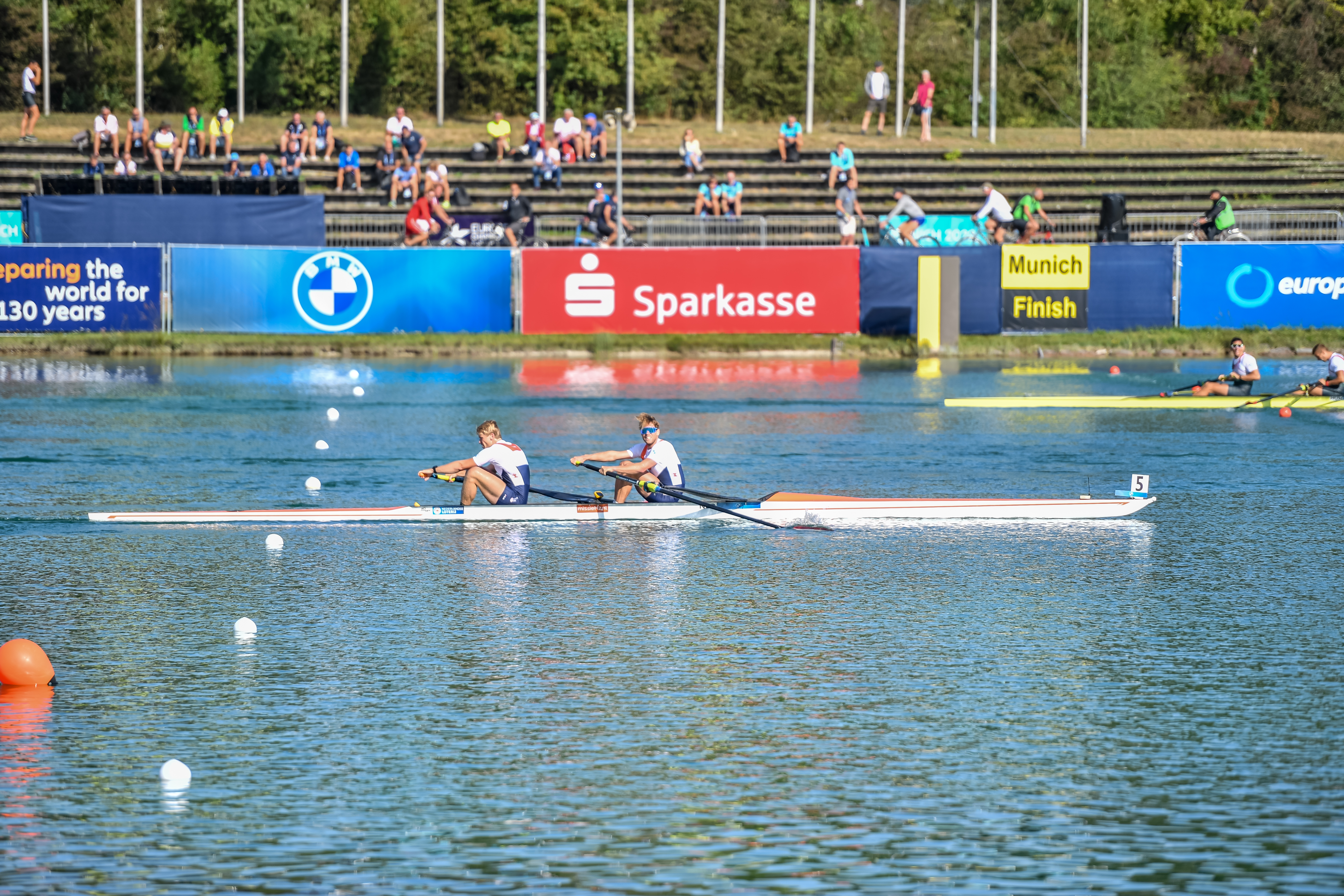

Personal information
- Nationality: Dutch
- Born: 17 August 1994 (age 31)

Sport
- Country: Netherlands
- Sport: Rowing

Achievements and titles
- Olympic finals: Tokyo 2020 M4-
Medal record
Men's rowing
Representing Netherlands
European Championships
Gold medal – first place	2020 Poznań	Coxless four
Silver medal – second place	2023 Bled	Coxless four
U23 World Championships
Gold medal – first place	2016 Rotterdam	Eight

Nelson Ritsema (born 17 August 1994) is a Dutch rower. He competed in the 2020 Summer Olympics.
