= Ross Corrigan =

Irish rower (born 1999)

Personal information
- Nationality: Irish
- Born: 4 January 1999 (age 27) Kinawley, County Fermanagh, Northern Ireland
- Home town: Enniskillen, County Fermanagh

Sport
- Sport: Rowing
- Club: Portora Boat Club
Medal record
Men's rowing
Representing Ireland
World Championships
Bronze medal – third place	2023 Belgrade	Coxless pair

Ross Corrigan (born 4 January 1999) is an Irish rower.

== Biography ==
Like his teammate Nathan Timoney, he was born and raised in County Fermanagh and attended Queen's University Belfast. He competed at the 2024 Summer Olympics. He and Timoney reached the final.
