= Nathan Timoney =

Irish rower (born 2000)

Personal information
- Nationality: Irish
- Born: 6 September 2000 (age 25) County Fermanagh, Northern Ireland
- Home town: Enniskillen, County Fermanagh

Sport
- Sport: Rowing
Medal record
Men's rowing
Representing Ireland
World Championships
Bronze medal – third place	2023 Belgrade	Coxless pair

Nathan Timoney (born 6 September 2000) is an Irish rower.

== Biography ==
Like his teammate Ross Corrigan, he was born and raised in County Fermanagh and attended Queen's University Belfast. He competed at the 2024 Summer Olympics. He and Corrigan reached the final.
