= Adrián Juhász =

Hungarian rower

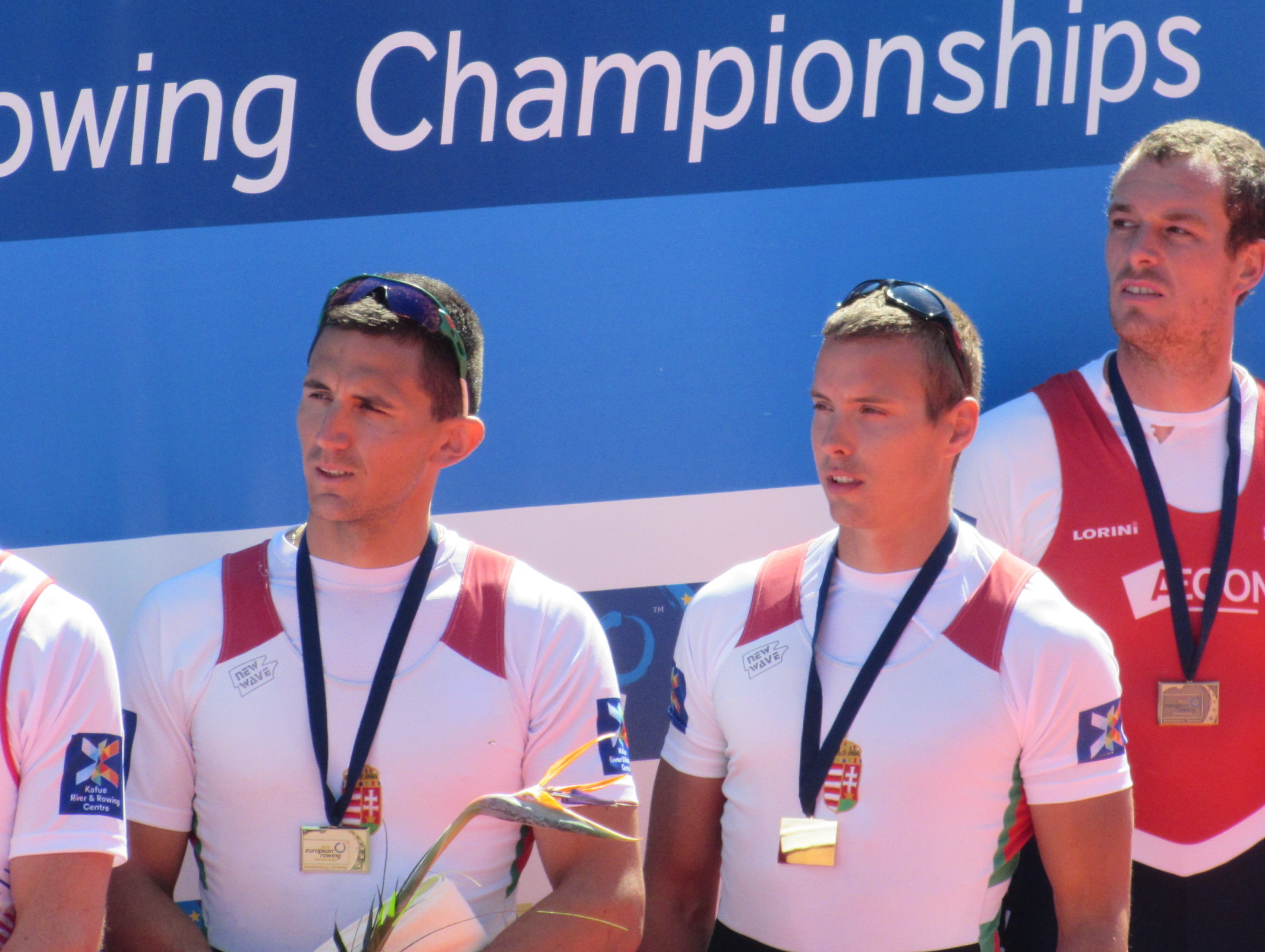

Personal information
- Full name: Adrián Attila Juhász
- Nationality: Hungarian
- Born: 18 November 1989 (age 36) Szolnok, Hungary
- Height: 188 cm (6 ft 2 in)
- Weight: 89 kg (196 lb)

Sport
- Country: Hungary
- Sport: Rowing
Medal record
Men's rowing
Representing Hungary
World Championships
Gold medal – first place	2017 Sarasota	Coxed pair
European Championships
Gold medal – first place	2016 Brandenburg	Coxless pair

Adrián Attila Juhász (born 18 November 1989) is a Hungarian rower. He competed in the men's coxless pair event at the 2016 Summer Olympics.
