= Phillip Wilson (rower) =

New Zealand rower (born 1996)

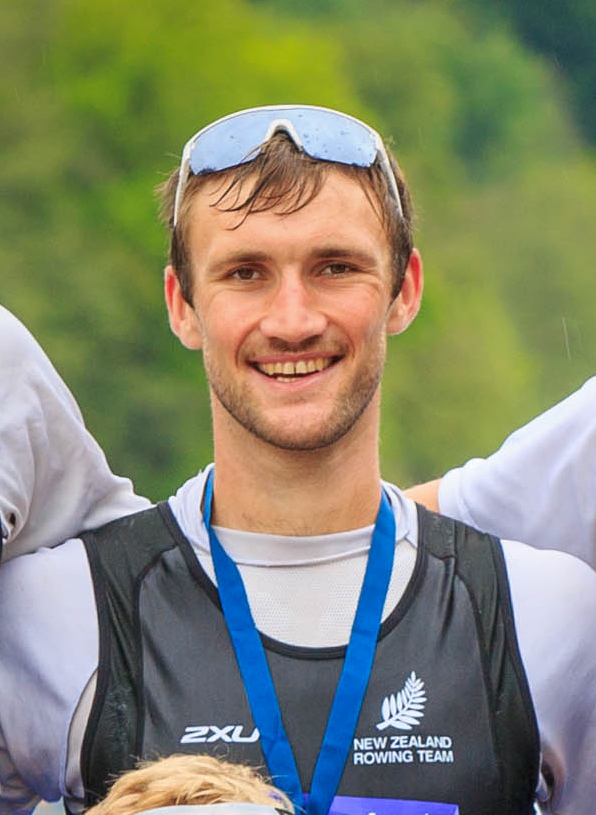
- Wilson in 2021

Personal information
- Born: 13 November 1996 (age 30) Wellington, New Zealand
- Height: 1.84 m (6 ft 0 in)

Sport
- Country: New Zealand
- Sport: Rowing
Medal record
Men's rowing
Representing New Zealand
Olympic Games
Gold medal – first place	2020 Tokyo	Eight

Phillip Wilson (born 13 November 1996) is a New Zealand rower. He won Olympic gold in the men's eight event at the 2020 Summer Olympics. He went to Wellington College in Wellington where he took up rowing.

In March 2021, Rowing New Zealand announced the elite team for the Olympic year and Wilson was placed in the eight that had yet to qualify for the Games. At the Final Olympic Qualification Regatta at the Rotsee in May 2021, the top two teams gained qualification (four teams competed) and the New Zealand eight won both the preliminary race and the final. When New Zealand's Olympic team was announced in June 2021, Wilson was confirmed to start with the eight. At the Tokyo Olympics, the men's eight was beaten in their heat by the Netherlands and had to thus go to the repechage, which they won. In the final, they sprinted past Germany and Great Britain to win the gold medal.
