= Javier García (rower) =

Spanish rower (born 1992)

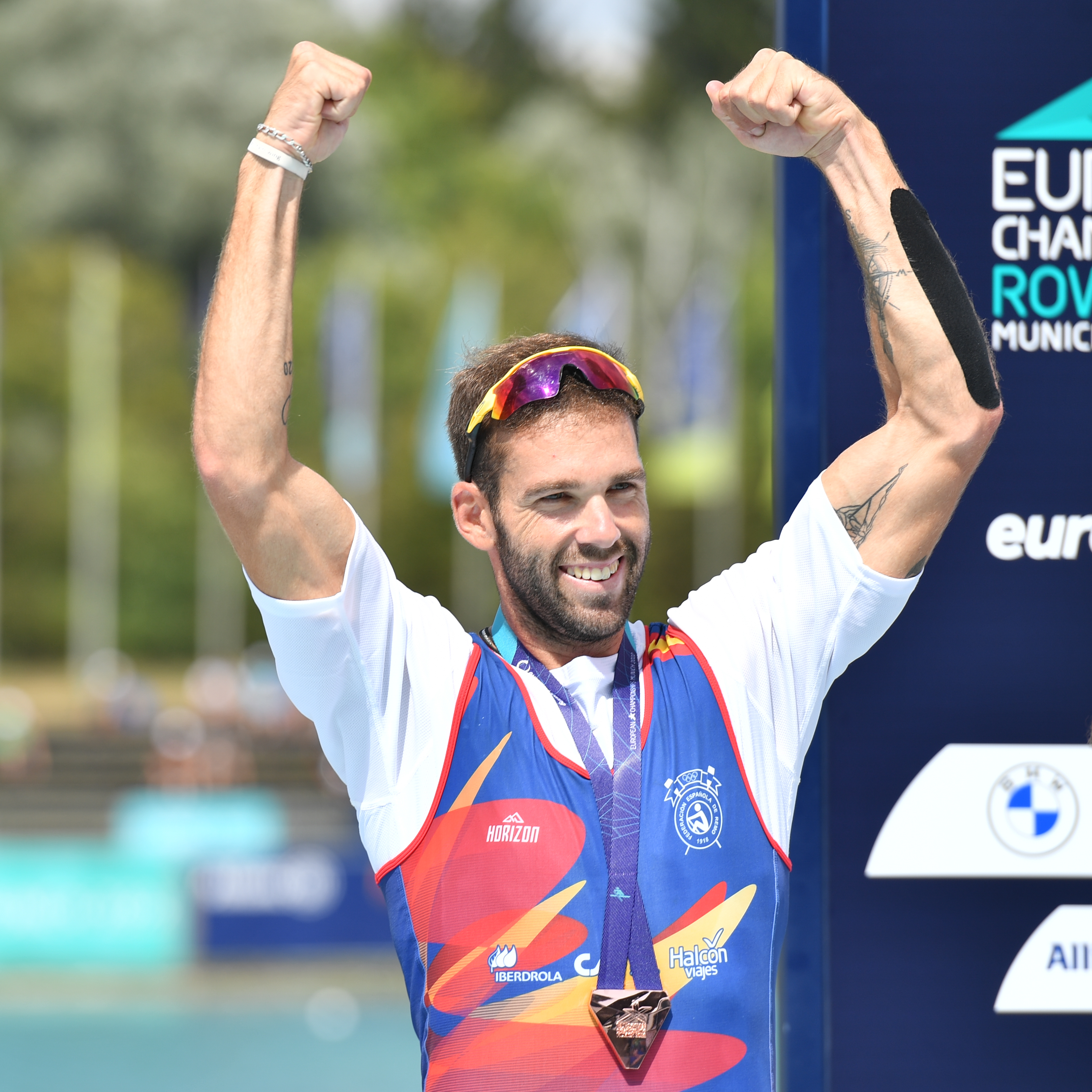

Personal information
- Full name: Javier García Ordóñez
- Nationality: Spanish
- Born: 16 June 1992 (age 34) Seville, Spain
- Height: 1.85 m (6 ft 1 in)

Sport
- Country: Spain
- Sport: Rowing

Achievements and titles
- Olympic finals: Tokyo 2020 M2-
Medal record
Men's rowing
Representing Spain
World Championships
Silver medal – second place	2022 Račice	Coxless pair
European Championships
Bronze medal – third place	2019 Lucerne	Coxless pair
Bronze medal – third place	2022 Munich	Coxless pair
Bronze medal – third place	2023 Bled	Coxless pair

Javier García Ordóñez (born 16 June 1992) is a Spanish rower. He competed at the 2020 Summer Olympics, held July–August 2021 in Tokyo.
