= Jaime Canalejo =

Spanish rower (born 1991)

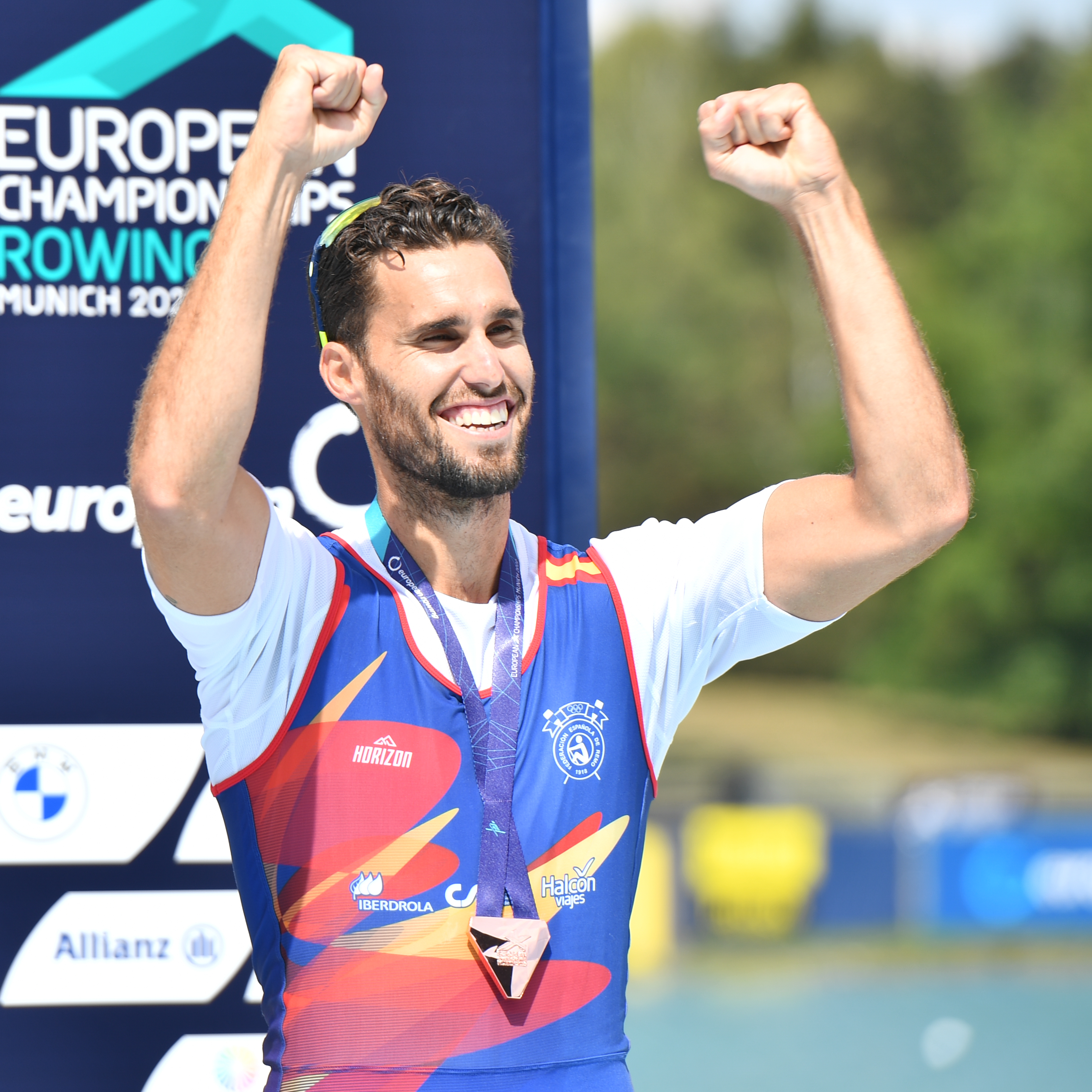

Personal information
- Full name: Jaime Canalejo Pazos
- Nationality: Spain
- Born: 25 November 1991 (age 34) Seville, Spain
- Height: 1.95 m (6 ft 5 in)

Sport
- Sport: Rowing

Achievements and titles
- Olympic finals: Tokyo 2020 M2-
Medal record
Men's rowing
Representing Spain
World Championships
Silver medal – second place	2022 Račice	Coxless pair
European Championships
Bronze medal – third place	2019 Lucerne	Coxless pair
Bronze medal – third place	2022 Munich	Coxless pair
Bronze medal – third place	2023 Bled	Coxless pair
Bronze medal – third place	2025 Plovdiv	Coxless pair

Jaime Canalejo Pazos (Note: In this Spanish name, the first or paternal surname is Canalejo and the second or maternal family name is Pazos.) (born 25 November 1991) is a Spanish rower. He competed in the 2020 Summer Olympics.
