= 2017 World Rowing Championships – Men's eight =

Men's eight at the 2017 World Rowing Championships
- Venue: Nathan Benderson Park
- Location: Sarasota, United States
- Dates: 26 September – 1 October
- Competitors: 108 from 12 nations
- Winning time: 5:26.85

Medalists
gold medal	Johannes Weißenfeld; Felix Wimberger; Max Planer; Torben Johannesen; Jakob Schneider; Malte Jakschik; Richard Schmidt; Hannes Ocik; Martin Sauer	Germany
silver medal	Dariush Aghai; Yohann Rigogne; Alexander Karwoski; Jordan Vanderstoep; Thomas Peszek; Nicholas Mead; Andrew Reed; Patrick Eble; Julian Venonsky	United States
bronze medal	Cesare Gabbia; Emanuele Liuzzi; Luca Parlato; Paolo Perino; Bruno Rosetti; Mario Paonessa; Davide Mumolo; Leonardo Pietra; Enrico D'Aniello	Italy

The men's eight competition at the 2017 World Rowing Championships in Sarasota took place in Nathan Benderson Park.

== Schedule ==
The schedule was as follows:

Date	Time	Round
Tuesday 26 September 2017	13:35	Heats
Thursday 28 September 2017	13:01	Repechages
Sunday 1 October 2017	09:25	Final B
Sunday 1 October 2017	11:12	Final A

All times are Eastern Daylight Time (UTC−4)

== Results ==
=== Heats ===
Heat winners advanced directly to the A final. The remaining boats were sent to the repechages.

==== Heat 1 ====
Rank	Rowers	Country	Time	Notes
1	Gabbia, Liuzzi, Parlato, Perino, Rosetti, Paonessa, Mumolo, Pietra, D'Aniello	Italy	5:32.39	FA
2	Dawson, McBrierty, Cook, Neill, Ransley, Sinclair, Rudkin, Tredell, Fieldman	Great Britain	5:34.60	R
3	Playfair, Bowden, Coombs, Masters, Moore, Keenan, Watts, Purnell, Rook	Australia	5:36.85	R
4	van den Ende, Knab, Braas, Wieten, Hendriks, Meylink, Versluis, Lücken, van Engelenburg	Netherlands	5:37.90	R
5	Zarutskiy, Kuznetsov, Podshivalov, Morgachyov, Kosov, Kornilov, Balandin, Kulesh, Safonkin	Russia	5:40.59	R
6	Sun, Li, Li, Cong, Ni, Liu, Qu, Wang, Liang	China	5:47.31	R

==== Heat 2 ====
Rank	Rowers	Country	Time	Notes
1	Weißenfeld, Wimberger, Planer, Johannesen, Schneider, Jakschik, Schmidt, Ocik, Sauer	Germany	5:29.36	FA
2	Aghai, Rigogne, Karwoski, Vanderstoep, Peszek, Mead, Reed, Eble, Venonsky	United States	5:30.38	R
3	Ivascu, Cozmiuc, Damii, Adam, Radu, Bejan, Pîrghie, Tudosa, Munteanu	Romania	5:31.30	R
4	Lassche, Conradie, McInnes, Grainger, Kirkham, Brake, Robertson, Jones, Shepherd	New Zealand	5:35.65	R
5	Bogoiavlenskyi, Boklazhenko, Hula, Kholyaznykov, Verestiuk, Nadtoka, Mikhay, Moroz, Konovaliuk	Ukraine	5:37.57	R
6	Modrzyński, Schodowski, Fuchs, Ablewski, Aranowski, Wilangowski, Brzeziński, Juszczak, Trojanowski	Poland	5:44.64	R

=== Repechages ===
The two fastest boats in each repechage advanced to the A final. The remaining boats were sent to the B final.

==== Repechage 1 ====
Rank	Rowers	Country	Time	Notes
1	van den Ende, Knab, Braas, Wieten, Hendriks, Meylink, Versluis, Lücken, van Engelenburg	Netherlands	5:32.59	FA
2	Ivascu, Cozmiuc, Damii, Adam, Radu, Bejan, Pîrghie, Tudosa, Munteanu	Romania	5:34.22	FA
3	Dawson, McBrierty, Cook, Neill, Ransley, Sinclair, Rudkin, Tredell, Fieldman	Great Britain	5:35.70	FB
4	Bogoiavlenskyi, Boklazhenko, Hula, Kholyaznykov, Verestiuk, Nadtoka, Mikhay, Moroz, Konovaliuk	Ukraine	5:41.32	FB
5	Sun, Li, Li, Cong, Ni, Liu, Qu, Wang, Liang	China	5:53.48	FB

==== Repechage 2 ====
Rank	Rowers	Country	Time	Notes
1	Aghai, Rigogne, Karwoski, Vanderstoep, Peszek, Mead, Reed, Eble, Venonsky	United States	5:34.61	FA
2	Lassche, Conradie, McInnes, Grainger, Kirkham, Brake, Robertson, Jones, Shepherd	New Zealand	5:36.55	FA
3	Modrzyński, Schodowski, Fuchs, Ablewski, Aranowski, Wilangowski, Brzeziński, Juszczak, Trojanowski	Poland	5:38.76	FB
4	Playfair, Bowden, Coombs, Masters, Moore, Keenan, Watts, Purnell, Rook	Australia	5:40.37	FB
5	Zarutskiy, Kuznetsov, Podshivalov, Morgachyov, Kosov, Kornilov, Balandin, Kulesh, Safonkin	Russia	5:43.31	FB

=== Finals ===
The A final determined the rankings for places 1 to 6. Additional rankings were determined in the B final.

==== Final B ====
Rank	Rowers	Country	Time
1	Dawson, McBrierty, Cook, Neill, Ransley, Sinclair, Rudkin, Tredell, Fieldman	Great Britain	5:39.77
2	Playfair, Bowden, Coombs, Masters, Moore, Keenan, Watts, Purnell, Rook	Australia	5:41.23
3	Bogoiavlenskyi, Boklazhenko, Hula, Kholyaznykov, Verestiuk, Nadtoka, Mikhay, Moroz, Konovaliuk	Ukraine	5:41.60
4	Modrzyński, Schodowski, Fuchs, Ablewski, Aranowski, Wilangowski, Brzeziński, Juszczak, Trojanowski	Poland	5:42.48
5	Zarutskiy, Kuznetsov, Podshivalov, Morgachyov, Kosov, Kornilov, Balandin, Kulesh, Safonkin	Russia	5:45.17
6	Sun, Li, Li, Cong, Ni, Liu, Qu, Wang, Liang	China	5:47.22

==== Final A ====
Rank	Rowers	Country	Time
1st place, gold medalist(s)	Weißenfeld, Wimberger, Planer, Johannesen, Schneider, Jakschik, Schmidt, Ocik, Sauer	Germany	5:26.85
2nd place, silver medalist(s)	Aghai, Rigogne, Karwoski, Vanderstoep, Peszek, Mead, Reed, Eble, Venonsky	United States	5:28.45
3rd place, bronze medalist(s)	Gabbia, Liuzzi, Parlato, Perino, Rosetti, Paonessa, Mumolo, Pietra, D'Aniello	Italy	5:28.90
4	van den Ende, Knab, Braas, Wieten, Hendriks, Meylink, Versluis, Lücken, van Engelenburg	Netherlands	5:29.23
5	Ivascu, Cozmiuc, Damii, Adam, Radu, Bejan, Pîrghie, Tudosa, Munteanu	Romania	5:31.41
6	Lassche, Conradie, McInnes, Grainger, Kirkham, Brake, Robertson, Jones, Shepherd	New Zealand	5:34.00
