= 2022 World Rowing Championships – Men's eight =

Men's eight at the 2022 World Rowing Championships
- Venue: Labe aréna
- Location: Račice, Czech Republic
- Dates: 20 September – 25 September
- Competitors: 99 from 11 nations
- Winning time: 5:24.41

Medalists
gold medal	Rory Gibbs; Morgan Bolding; David Bewicke-Copley; Sholto Carnegie; Charles Elwes; Thomas Digby; James Rudkin; Thomas Ford; Harry Brightmore	Great Britain
silver medal	Niki van Sprang; Lennart van Lierop; Abe Wiersma; Jacob van de Kerkhof; Michiel Mantel; Mick Makker; Guus Mollee; Guillaume Krommenhoek; Dieuwke Fetter	Netherlands
bronze medal	Rohan Lavery; Nicholas Lavery; Henry Youl; Benjamin Canham; Angus Widdicombe; Sam Hardy; William O'Shannessy; Jackson Kench; Kendall Brodie	Australia

The men's eight competition at the 2022 World Rowing Championships took place at the Račice regatta venue.

== Schedule ==
The schedule was as follows:

Date	Time	Round
Tuesday 20 September 2022	12:54	Heats
Friday 23 September 2022	12:36	Repechages
Sunday 25 September 2022	12:44	Final B
Sunday 25 September 2022	14:10	Final A

All times are Central European Summer Time (UTC+2)

== Results ==
=== Heats ===
The fastest boat in each heat advanced directly to the final A. The remaining boats were sent to the repechages.

==== Heat 1 ====
Rank	Rower	Country	Time	Notes
1	Gibbs, Bolding, Bewicke-Copley, Carnegie, Elwes, Digby, Rudkin, Ford, Brightmore	Great Britain	5:31.29	FA
2	Tiganescu, Semciuc, Arteni, Adam, Cozmiuc, Bejan, Berariu, Lehaci, Munteanu	Romania	5:32.93	R
3	Karwoski, Rusher, Clougher, Corrigan, Knippen, Gaard, Carlson, Quinton, Catalano	United States	5:35.88	R
4	Scalzone, Castaldo, Gaetani Liseo, Abagnale, Di Costanzo, Lodo, Vicino, Pietra Caprina, D'Aniello	Italy	5:43.11	R
5	Sun Lu, Ji Gaoxing, Su Ruihao, Lyu Yi, Wei Jie, Meng Yincen, Cui Binghui, Liu Wei, Lyu Wenli	China	5:49.07	R
6	Sydoruk, Ivanov, Kachanov, Futryk, Verestiuk, Kravchenko, Derkach, Hula, Konovaliuk	Ukraine	5:52.84	R

==== Heat 2 ====
Rank	Rower	Country	Time	Notes
1	Gadsdon, King, Ames, Clegg, Crothers, Been, Lancashire, Buczek, Court	Canada	5:30.39	FA
2	van Sprang, Van Lierop, Wiersma, Van De Kerkhof, Mantel, Makker, Mollee, Krommenhoek, Fetter	Netherlands	5:31.26	R
3	R. Lavery, N. Lavery, Youl, Canham, Widdicombe, Hardy, O'Shannessy, Kench, Brodie	Australia	5:35.50	R
4	Hinrichs, Angl, Garth, Tewes, Eggeling, Schönherr, Schröder, Johannesen, Wiesen	Germany	5:43.17	R
5	Dočekal, Chlebovský, Jezek, Cizek, Keller, Diblik, Baldrián, Nosek, Zelenková	Czech Republic	5:59.90	R

=== Repechages ===
The two fastest boats in each heat advanced directly to the final A. The remaining boats were sent to the final B.

==== Repechage 1 ====
Rank	Rower	Country	Time	Notes
1	R. Lavery, N. Lavery, Youl, Canham, Widdicombe, Hardy, O'Shannessy, Kench, Brodie	Australia	5:25.12	FA
2	Tiganescu, Semciuc, Arteni, Adam, Cozmiuc, Bejan, Berariu, Lehaci, Munteanu	Romania	5:25.56	FA
3	Scalzone, Castaldo, Gaetani Liseo, Abagnale, Di Costanzo, Lodo, Vicino, Pietra Caprina, D'Aniello	Italy	5:38.18	FB
4	Sydoruk, Ivanov, Kachanov, Futryk, Verestiuk, Kravchenko, Derkach, Hula, Konovaliuk	Ukraine	5:47.17	FB
5	Dočekal, Chlebovský, Jezek, Cizek, Keller, Diblik, Baldrián, Nosek, Zelenková	Czech Republic	5:49.21	FB

==== Repechage 2 ====
Rank	Rower	Country	Time	Notes
1	van Sprang, Van Lierop, Wiersma, Van De Kerkhof, Mantel, Makker, Mollee, Krommenhoek, Fetter	Netherlands	5:25.93	FA
2	Karwoski, Rusher, Clougher, Corrigan, Knippen, Gaard, Carlson, Quinton, Catalano	United States	5:27.71	FA
3	Hinrichs, Angl, Garth, Tewes, Eggeling, Schönherr, Schröder, Johannesen, Wiesen	Germany	5:33.17	FB
4	Sun Lu, Ji Gaoxing, Su Ruihao, Lyu Yi, Wei Jie, Meng Yincen, Cui Binghui, Liu Wei, Lyu Wenli	China	5:44.04	FB

=== Finals ===
The A final determined the rankings for places 1 to 6. Additional rankings were determined in the other finals

==== Final B ====
Rank	Rower	Country	Time	Total rank
1	Hinrichs, Angl, Jonh, Tewes, Eggeling, Schönherr, Schröder, Johannesen, Wiesen	Germany	5:33.33	7
2	Sun Lu, Ji Gaoxing, Su Ruihao, Lyu Yi, Wei Jie, Meng Yincen, Cui Binghui, Liu Wei, Lyu Wenli	China	5:35.38	8
3	Scalzone, Castaldo, Gaetani Liseo, Abagnale, Di Costanzo, Lodo, Vicino, Pietra Caprina, D'Aniello	Italy	5:38.11	9
4	Dočekal, Chlebovský, Jezek, Cizek, Keller, Diblik, Baldrián, Nosek, Zelenková	Czech Republic	5:45.67	10
5	Sydoruk, Ivanov, Kachanov, Futryk, Verestiuk, Kravchenko, Derkach, Hula, Konovaliuk	Ukraine	5:50.09	11

==== Final A ====
Rank	Rower	Country	Time	Notes
1st place, gold medalist(s)	Gibbs, Bolding, Bewicke-Copley, Carnegie, Elwes, Digby, Rudkin, Ford, Brightmore	Great Britain	5:24.41	
2nd place, silver medalist(s)	van Sprang, Van Lierop, Wiersma, Van De Kerkhof, Mantel, Makker, Mollee, Krommenhoek, Fetter	Netherlands	5:25.52	
3rd place, bronze medalist(s)	R. Lavery, N. Lavery, Youl, Canham, Widdicombe, Hardy, O'Shannessy, Kench, Brodie	Australia	5:27.72	
4	Karwoski, Rusher, Clougher, Corrigan, Knippen, Gaard, Carlson, Quinton, Catalano	United States	5:29.20	
5	Gadsdon, King, Ames, Clegg, Crothers, Been, Lancashire, Buczek, Court	Canada	5:30.71	
6	Tiganescu, Semciuc, Arteni, Adam, Cozmiuc, Bejan, Berariu, Lehaci, Munteanu	Romania	5:31.30	
