= He Jing =

He Jing or Jing He may refer to:

- He Jing (engineer) (1934–2019), Chinese hydraulic engineer and politician
- He Jing (politician) (born 1964, Chinese: 何靖), Chinese politician.
- He Jing (TV presenter) (born 1969), Chinese television presenter
- He Jing (canoeist) (born 1983), Chinese sprint canoeist
- He Jing (table tennis), Malaysian table tennis player; see Table tennis at the 2014 Commonwealth Games – Women's team

== See also ==
- Ho Ching
