= Max Planer =

German rower (born 1991)

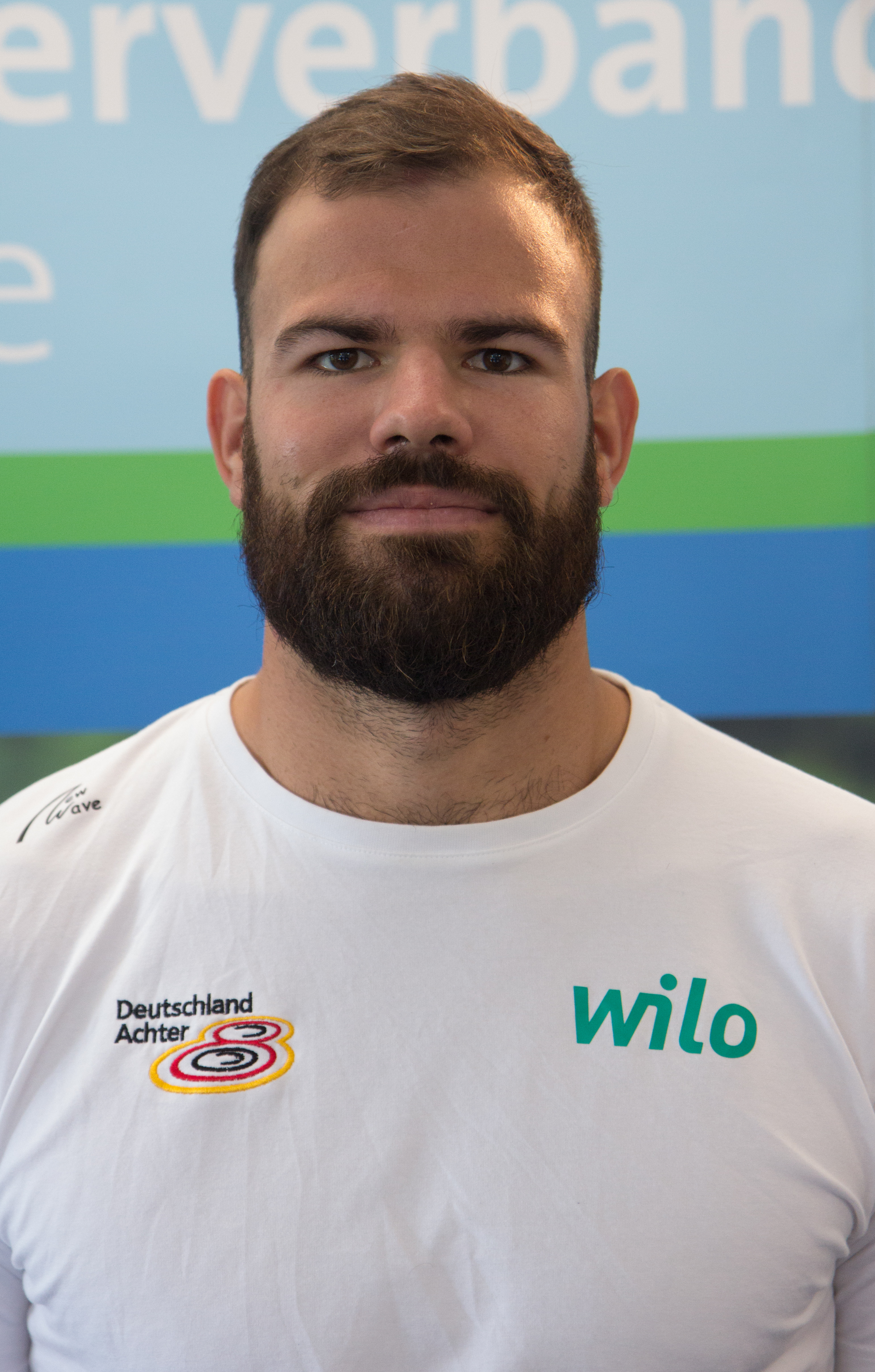
- Planer in 2017

Personal information
- Full name: Maximilian Planer
- Born: 28 January 1991 (age 35) Bernburg an der Saale, Germany
- Height: 198 cm (6 ft 6 in)
- Weight: 94 kg (207 lb)

Sport
- Sport: Rowing
Medal record
Men's rowing
Representing Germany
World Championships
Gold medal – first place	2017 Sarasota	Eight
Gold medal – first place	2018 Plovdiv	Eight
Silver medal – second place	2014 Amsterdam	Eight
European Championships
Gold medal – first place	2014 Belgrade	Eight
Gold medal – first place	2017 Račice	Eight
Gold medal – first place	2018 Glasgow	Eight
Bronze medal – third place	2013 Seville	Coxless four
Bronze medal – third place	2019 Lucerne	Coxless four

Maximilian Planer (born 28 January 1991) is a German representative rower. He is an Olympian a two time senior world champion in the German men's eight- the Deutschlandachter, and a two time underage world champion. He competed in the men's coxless four event at the 2016 Summer Olympics. He rowed in the three seat when the Deutschlandachter at the 2017 World Rowing Cup II set a world's best time of 5.18.68, still the standing world mark as of 2024.

== International rowing career ==
Planer's representative debut for Germany came in 2008 when he was selected in the German junior men's eight which won gold at the World Junior Rowing Championships in Ottensheim. Planer won that world junior title rowing with Felix Wimberger with whom ten years later, he would win two senior world titles. In 2010 Planer rowed in the German junior quad scull which won gold at the World Junior Rowing Championships in Brive-la Gaillarde. In 2011 he moved into the U23 eight which finished in fourth place at the World U23 Rowing Championships in Amsterdam and he again rowed in that U23 eight in 2012 to a silver medal at that year's U23 World Championships.

In 2013 Planer moved into the German senior squad and a coxless four which finished in overall twelfth place at the 2013 World Rowing Championships in Chungju, South Korea. 2014 saw Planer secure a seat in the German men's eight. The 2014 eight was successful at the European Championships and the World Rowing Cup II and then at the 2014 World Rowing Championships in Amsterdam finished 0.66 seconds behind Great Britain and brought home a silver medal.

2015 saw Planer in the German men's coxless four which competed at World Rowing Cups and took fifth place at the 2015 World Rowing Championships in Aiguebelette. That same four went to the 2016 European Championships placing seventh, managed a fourth place at one of their two World Rowing Cup appearances and then at Rio 2016 they failed to make the A final and finished in overall twelfth place.

The German marquee boat -the men's eight- was rebuilt in 2017 following the Olympics and Planer was one of five new oarsmen who gained seats. He held the three seat throughout their dominant season campaign, winning gold at the European Championships, two World Rowing Cups and ultimately at the 2017 World Rowing Championships in Sarasota, Florida where the German eight were crowned as world champions. In June 2017 at the World Rowing Cup II in Poznan they set a new world's best time for the eight, taking 0.67 seconds off a 2012 mark set by Canada. The German crew with every man holding the same seat, continued their European and world dominance throughout 2018 winning at three World Rowing Cups, the 2018 European Championships and then defending their world title at the 2018 World Rowing Championships in Plovdiv.

In 2019 Planer was moved back to the German men's coxless four. They competed at all regattas in the international season and finished in overall tenth place at the 2019 World Rowing Championships. Those performances did not qualify the boat for the 2020 Tokyo Olympics and they tried for final seeding for those delayed games at the 2021 final Olympic qualification regatta in Lucerne. They did not make the final or the qualification cut-off.
