= Pulling the wool of socialism's sheep =

Chinese phrase

- Chinese: 薅社会主义羊毛
- Origin: Yesterday, Today, Tomorrow
- Meaning: to take advantage of the country and its people

Pulling the wool of socialism's sheep (Chinese: 薅社会主义羊毛; pinyin: hāo shèhuìzhǔyì yángmáo) is a phrase originating from the sketch comedy Yesterday, Today and Tomorrow performed by Zhao Benshan, Song Dandan and Cui Yongyuan. The phrase is uttered by Aunt Baiyun (played by Song) and it means to take advantage of a collective small gain to satisfy one's own selfish desire.

Baiyun recalled the difficult times and used the opportunity of herding sheep for the production team to knit a sweater for uncle Heitu. Her act was ridiculed as "pulling the wool of socialism's sheep and digging the corner of socialism." This sketch comedy made "pulling the wool of socialism's sheep" a buzzword in 1999, and 20 years later, it become an almost Internet-exclusive term.
