= Tell It Like It Is =

Tell It Like It Is may refer to:

- Tell It Like It Tis, a 1966 album by Richard "Groove" Holmes
- Tell It Like It Is (George Benson album), 1969
- Tell It Like It Is (Billy Joe Royal album), 1989
- Tell It Like It Is, a 2010 album by Thomas Quasthoff
- "Tell It Like It Is" (song), a 1966 song written by George Davis and Lee Diamond
- "Tell It Like It T-I-Is", a song by the B-52's, 1992
- Tell It Like It Is (talk show), a Chinese talk show aired from 1996 to 2009
