= Darcy Wruck =

Australian rower (born 1995)

Personal information
- Nationality: Australian
- Born: 16 January 1995 (age 31)

Sport
- Country: Australia
- Sport: Rowing
Medal record
Men's rowing
Representing Australia
World Championships
Silver medal – second place	2017 Sarasota	Coxed pair

Darcy Wruck (born 16 January 1995) is an Australian rower. He has represented at underage and senior world championships and won a silver medal at the 2017 World Championships in an Australian coxed pair.

== Club and state rowing ==
Queensland state representation first came for Wruck in the 2013 youth eight which contested the Noel Wilkinson Trophy at the Interstate Regatta within the Australian Rowing Championships. He rowed again in the Queensland youth eight in 2014 and 2015

Wruck made the 2016 Queensland senior men's eight competing for the King's Cup at the Interstate Regatta. He contested further King's Cups in Queensland maroon in 2017 and 2018.

== International representative rowing ==
Wruck made his Australian representative debut at the 2013 Junior World Rowing Championships in Trakai in an Australian junior coxed four which raced to a seventh place finish. In 2016 he rowed in the eight at the World Rowing U23 Championships in Rotterdam.

The following year Wruck was tested in various sweep-oared boats in the international season of the Australian senior squad. He raced in the eight to a fourth place at the World Rowing Cup II in Poznan and in a coxless four at the WRC III in Lucerne. Then at the 2017 World Rowing Championships in Sarasota and teamed with Angus Widdicombe, Wruck rowed a coxed pair bearing James Rook up front, to a silver medal.

== School Coaching ==
=== Brisbane Girls Grammar School (–2021) ===
Prior to 2021, Darcy served as Head coach and Coordinator of the Brisbane Girls Grammar School's rowing program, where he helped oversee athlete development and program performance.

=== Anglican Church Grammar School (2021–2023) ===
In 2021, Darcy was appointed Director of Rowing at Anglican Church Grammar School School in Brisbane. During his tenure, he led the school’s rowing program and developed a reputation for combining high-performance coaching with a focus on student development and wellbeing.

=== Caulfield Grammar School (2023–present) ===
In September 2023, Darcy joined Caulfield Grammar School as Head Of Rowing. In the role, he has continued to focus on athlete progression, leadership, and the development of the school’s Rowing program.
