= Nicholas Lavery =

Australian rower (born 1998)

Personal information
- Born: 1 July 1998 (age 27) Carlton, Victoria, Australia
- Home town: Williamstown, Victoria
- Education: Wesley College, Melbourne
- Years active: 2018–current
- Height: 191 cm (6 ft 3 in)
- Weight: 87 kg (192 lb)

Sport
- Sport: Rowing
- Club: Melbourne University Boat Club; UTS Haberfield Rowing Club
- Coached by: Rhett Ayliffe, Mark Prater

Achievements and titles
- Olympic finals: Tokyo 2020 M8+
- National finals: King's Cup 2021,22
Medal record
Men's rowing
Representing Australia
World Championships
Bronze medal – third place	2022 Račice	Eight

Nicholas Lavery (born 1 July 1998) is an Australian representative rower. He is an Australian national champion and has competed at underage and senior world championships. He rowed in the Australian men's eight at the Tokyo 2020 Olympics. He won a bronze medal at the 2022 World Championships.

== Club and state rowing ==
Raised in Melbourne, Lavery was schooled at Wesley College where he took up rowing. His senior club rowing started from the Melbourne University Boat Club. After making the Australian senior squad he joined the UTS Haberfield Rowing Club in Sydney.

Lavery's state representative debut for Victoria came in 2018 when he was selected in the state youth eight to contest the Noel Wilkinson trophy at the Interstate Regatta. In 2021 he was selected in the Victorian men's senior eight which contested and won the Kings Cup. In 2022 he again rowed in the Victorian men's senior eight at the Interstate Regatta. He raced in a coxless pair and a coxless four in UTS Haberfield Rowing Club colours at the 2021 Australian Championships.

== International representative rowing ==
Lavery made his Australian representative debut at the 2019 World Rowing U23 Championships in Sarasota-Bradenton, USA when he was selected in the three seat of the Australian coxless four which placed ninth.

By the time of national team selections for the delayed Tokyo Olympics, Lavery had forced his way into the Australian men's eight, which had qualified for the Olympics on 2019 international performances. In Tokyo the Australian men's eight placed fourth in their heat, fourth in the repechage and sixth in the Olympic A final. Had they repeated their repechage time of 5:25:06 they would have won a silver medal.

In March 2022 Lavery was selected in the Australian training team to prepare for the 2022 international season and the 2022 World Rowing Championships. He didn't row in either of the World Rowing Cups at which the Australian squad competed but by the 2022 World Rowing Championships at Racize, Lavery was back in the two seat of the men's eight rowing in front of his brother Rohan. The eight won through their repechage to make the A final where they raced to a third place and a World Championship bronze medal.
