= Angus Widdicombe =

Australian rower (born 1994)

Personal information
- Born: 31 August 1994 (age 31) Geelong, Australia
- Height: 1.94 m (6 ft 4 in)

Sport
- Country: Australia
- Sport: Rowing
- Club: Barwon Rowing Club; Mercantile Rowing Club

Achievements and titles
- Olympic finals: Tokyo 2020 M8+
- National finals: King's Cup 2015,17-19,21,22
Medal record
Men's rowing
Representing Australia
World Championships
Silver medal – second place	2017 Sarasota	Coxed pair
Silver medal – second place	2018 Plovdiv	Eight
Bronze medal – third place	2022 Račice	Eight
Bronze medal – third place	2023 Belgrade	Eight

Angus Widdicombe (born 31 August 1994) is an Australian rower. He is an Olympian, an Australian national champion, has represented at underage and senior world championships, winning consecutive silver medals at the 2017 and 2018 World Championships. He stroked the Australian men's eight at the Tokyo 2020 Olympics.

== Club and state rowing ==
Widdicombe attended Geelong College and he crewed that school's first VIII in 2011 and 2012. His senior club rowing was initially from the Barwon Rowing Club in Geelong and then from Melbourne's Mercantile Rowing Club.

In Mercantile club eights Widdicombe contested the Thames Challenge Cup at the Henley Royal Regatta in 2014 and 2015. In Mercantile colours he contested national titles at the Australian Rowing Championships. He raced in an U23 pair in 2015 and that year he won the U23 coxed four national championship.

Victorian state representation first came for Widdicombe in the 2014 youth eight which contested and won the Noel Wilkinson Trophy at the Interstate Regatta within the Australian Rowing Championships. He made the 2015 Victorian senior men's eight competing for the King's Cup at the Interstate Regatta and rowed in that year's King's Cup victory. He contested further King's Cups in the white V in 2017, 2018, 2019, 2022 and 2023 placing second to New South Wales in each of those years. In 2021 he stroked the Victorian men's eight to a King's Cup victory.

== International representative rowing ==
Widdicombe made his Australian representative debut at the 2016 World Rowing U23 Championships in Rotterdam in the Australian U23 eight which raced to a seventh place finish. The following year he was tested in various sweep-oared boats in the international season of the Australian senior squad. He raced in the eight to a fourth place at the World Rowing Cup II in Poznan and in a coxless four at the WRC III in Lucerne. Then at the 2017 World Rowing Championships in Sarasota and teamed with Darcy Wruck, Widdicombe rowed a coxed pair bearing James Rook up front, to a silver medal.

Widdicome was again in the Australian squad for their 2018 international tour. He rowed in the eight to a fifth placing at the World Rowing Cup II in Linz, Austria. In the touring party's second regatta of the 2018 season at the Henley Royal Regatta Widdicombe and Campbell Watts achieved the final of the Silver Goblets & Nickalls' Challenge Cup for the men’s pair and took on the champion Croatian brothers Martin and Valent Sinković, Olympic double-sculls champions then presenting their world class credentials as a pair. It was a convincing win for the Croatians. The following week at the World Rowing Cup III in Lucerne, Widdicombe stroked the Australian eight to silver medal in a thrilling 0.14 second finish behind Germany. The stage was set for the close competition that played out at the 2018 World Championships in Plovdiv. In their heat the Australian eight finished 5/100ths of a second behind the USA and then in the final, Germany dominated and took gold but 2/10ths of a second separated 2nd through to 4th and the Australians with Widdicombe setting the pace took silver, a bowball ahead of Great Britain with the USA just another bowball behind but out of the medals.

In 2019 Widdicombe was again selected to stroke the Australian men's eight for the 2019 international representative season. The eight placed 5th at the World Rowing Cup II in Poznan and 6th at WRC III in Rotterdam. Widdicombe then was selected to stroke the Australian eight at the 2019 World Rowing Championships in Linz, Austria. The eight were looking for a top five finish at the 2019 World Championships to qualify for the Tokyo Olympics. The eight placed second in their heat and fourth in the final and qualified for Tokyo 2020. In Tokyo the Australian men's eight placed fourth in their heat, fourth in the repechage and sixth in the Olympic A final. Had they repeated their repechage time of 5:25:06 they would have won the silver medal.

Widdicombe was selected into the Australian men's eight squad for the 2022 international season and the 2022 World Rowing Championships. At the World Rowing Cup II in Poznan and at the WRC III in Lucerne, Widdcombe rowed in the four seat of Australian men's eight to a silver medal on both occasions. At the 2022 World Rowing Championships at Racize, the eight won through their repechage to make the A final where they raced to a third place and a World Championship bronze medal.

In March 2023 Widdicombe was again selected in the Australian senior men's sweep-oar squad for the 2023 international season. At the Rowing World Cup II in Varese Italy, Widdicombe raced in the Australian men's eight. In the final after a slow start they rowed through most of the field to take second place and a silver medal. At 2023's RWC III in Lucerne, Widdicombe moved from seven into the stroke seat of the Australian men's eight. In the final they rowed stroke for stroke with their fancied Great Britain rivals but then moved away at the 1000m mark and held on for an upset gold medal victory. For the 2023 World Rowing Championships in Belgrade Serbia, the Australian men's eight was left unchanged and Widdicombe again stroked the crew. They won their heat powering past the USA eight who had headed them at the 1000m mark. In the A final Australia and Great Britain traded the lead over the first 1000m, but beyond that point the result mirrored that of 2022 with Great Britain exerting dominance by the 1500m, fighting off a fast finishing Dutch eight who took silver and leaving the Australians with the bronze for the second successive year.

== Personal life ==
Widdicombe studied a Bachelor of Environmental Science at Deakin University.
