= Nathan Bowden =

Australian rower

Personal information
- Born: 2 April 1993 (age 33) South Australia

Sport
- Country: Australia
- Sport: Rowing
- University team: Uni of South Australia
- Club: Adelaide Rowing Club; Sydney Rowing Club

Achievements and titles
- National finals: King's Cup 2012-19

Nathan Bowden (born 2 April 1993) is a South Australian former representative rower. He was an Australian national champion and represented at the 2017 World Rowing Championships.

== Club and state rowing ==
Bowden was raised in South Australia. His senior club rowing was initially from the Adelaide Rowing Club, the University of South Australia at the varsity level and then when he was in senior Australian representative squads from Sydney Rowing Club.

Bowden made his state representative debut for South Australia in the 2011 youth eight which contested the Noel Wilkinson Trophy at the annual Interstate Regatta within the Australian Rowing Championships. The following year he stepped up into the South Australian men's senior eight to contest the King's Cup at the Interstate Regatta. He was back in the South Australian youth eight in 2013, then rowed in further South Australian King's Cup eights in 2014 (silver), 2015 (bronze), 2016 (bronze), 2017 (bronze), 2018 and 2019.

== International representative rowing ==
Bowden made his Australian representative debut in 2011 when he was selected in the coxless four to race at the 2011 Junior World Rowing Championships at Eton Dorney. That crew placed thirteenth overall.

In early 2014 World Rowing Cup I was held in Sydney and Bowden was vying for selection in the Australian senior squad. All the Australian sweep oarsmen contested events in small boats and Bowden's coxless pair finished fifth in their final. Also at that regatta he raced in the #2 Australian eight which finished fourth. At the 2016 World University Championships in Poznan, Bowden raced as Australia's coxless pair with Angus Moore. They won a bronze medal.

In 2017 he made the Australian senior squad and was competing for a seat in the men's eight during the European racing season. He was in the two seat of the eight when they finished in 4th place at World Rowing Cup II. Then at WRC III he raced in a coxed pair with Ben Coombs and James Rook to a silver medal and also in a coxless pair to 13th place. Bowden was back in the Australian men's eight when they finished eight at the 2017 World Rowing Championships.

In 2018 Bowden made another senior squad appearance in an Australian #2 men's coxless four when they rowed in the heat and repechage at World Rowing Cup III in Lucerne. It was his final Australian representative showing, although he travelled with the squad to the World Championships that year as the sweep reserve.
