= Johannes Weißenfeld =

German rower

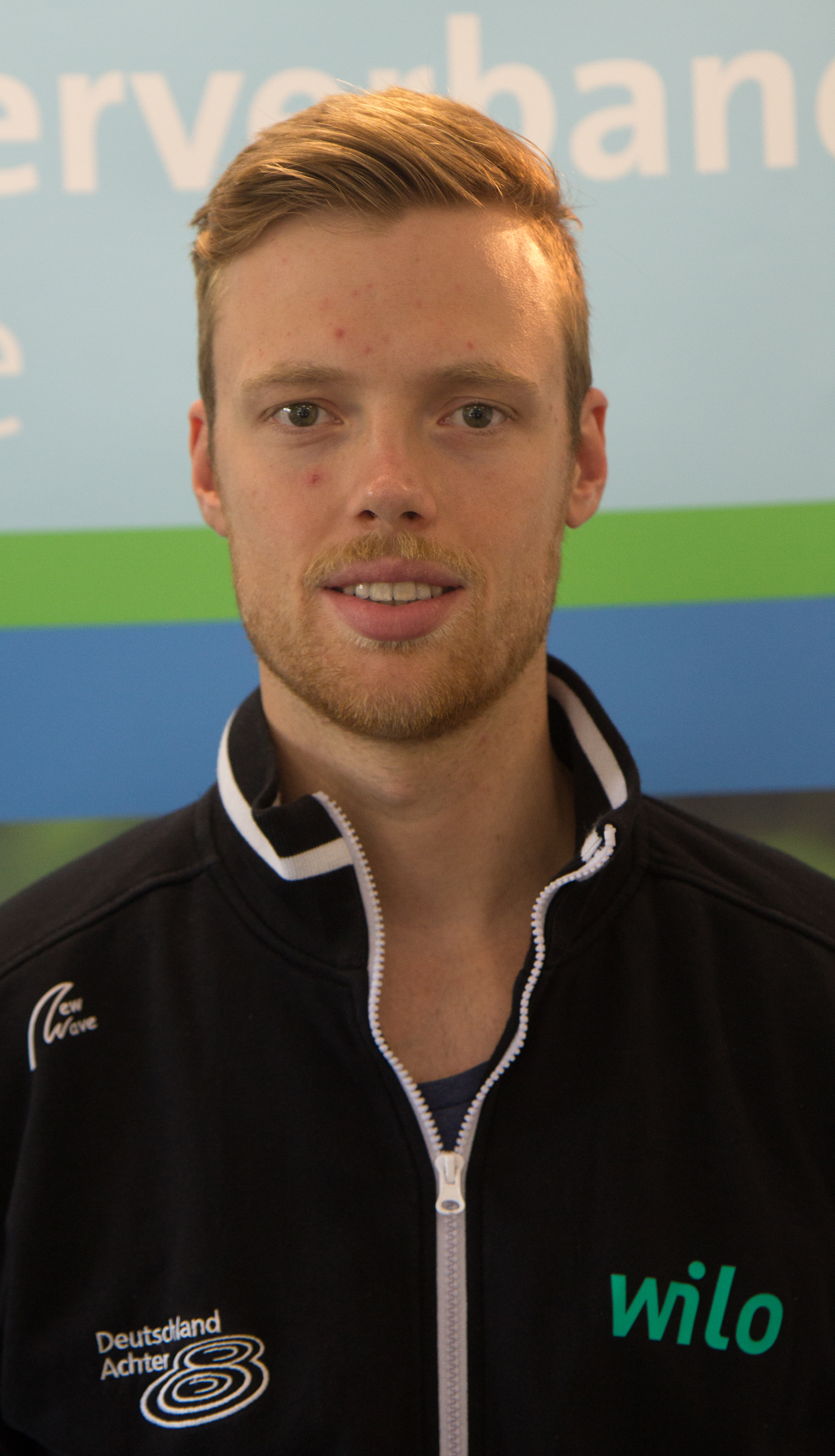

Personal information
- Nationality: German
- Born: 19 August 1994 (age 31) Herdecke, Germany
- Height: 1.99 m (6 ft 6 in)
- Weight: 90 kg (198 lb)

Sport
- Country: Germany
- Sport: Rowing
- Event: Eight
- Club: Ruderclub 'Westfalen' 1929 e.V. Herdecke
Medal record
Men's rowing
Representing Germany
Olympic Games
Silver medal – second place	2020 Tokyo	Eight
World Championships
Gold medal – first place	2017 Sarasota	Eight
Gold medal – first place	2018 Plovdiv	Eight
Gold medal – first place	2019 Ottensheim	Eight
European Championships
Gold medal – first place	2017 Račice	Eight
Gold medal – first place	2018 Glasgow	Eight
Gold medal – first place	2019 Lucerne	Eight
World Junior Championships
Gold medal – first place	2011 Dorney	Coxless four

Johannes Weißenfeld (born 19 August 1994) is a German former representative rower. He was a three time world champion and an Olympic silver medallist as a member of the German men's eight — the Deutschlandachter — which dominated the men's eight event from 2017 to 2019. He rowed at bow when the Deutschlandachter at the 2017 World Rowing Cup II set a world's best time of 5.18.68, which was still the standing world mark in 2021.

== International rowing career ==
Weißenfeld's representative debut for Germany came in 2011 when he was selected to row in a coxless four at the World Junior Rowing Championships at Eton Dorney. In a crew which included Malte Jakschik with whom he would later win three senior world championships, Weißenfeld rowed to a first placing and a junior world championship. In 2012 Weißenfeld was again selected to row in a junior German men's four which took a bronze medal at the 2012 Junior World Championships.

2013 saw Weißenfeld move into the German U23 men's eight which finished in sixth place at the World U23 Rowing Championships and then in 2014 a coxless four which took the silver medal at the U23 World Championships in Linz, Austria.

Weißenfeld in 2015 was elevated to the German senior squad and a coxless four which competed at World Rowing Cups and took fifth place at the 2015 World Rowing Championships in Aiguebelette. That same four went to the 2016 European Championships and placed seventh. 2016 saw him vying for a seat in the German men's eight and in 2017 he secured the bow seat and held it throughout their dominant season campaign, winning gold at the European Championships, two World Rowing Cups and ultimately at the 2017 World Rowing Championships in Sarasota, Florida where the German eight were crowned as world champions. In June 2017 at the World Rowing Cup II in Poznan they set a new world's best time for the eight, taking 0.67 seconds off a 2012 mark that had been set by Canada. The German crew with every man holding the same seat, continued their European and world dominance throughout 2018 winning at three World Rowing Cups, the 2018 European Championships and then defending their world title at the 2018 World Rowing Championships in Plovdiv. There were a handful of changes to the German eight in 2019 but Weißenfeld stayed in the bow end for another successful international season which culminated in his third successive world championship title at the 2019 World Rowing Championships in Ottensheim.

Their 2019 performances qualified that boat for Tokyo 2020. By the time of the 2021 selections for those delayed Olympics, Weißenfeld was still in the crew and set to make his Olympic rowing debut. At that Tokyo 2021 Olympic regatta he rowed at bow in the German eight to an Olympic silver medal.
