= William O'Shannessy =

Australian rower (born 1999)

Personal information
- Nickname: Shaggers
- Nationality: Australian
- Born: 28 August 1999 (age 26)
- Home town: Clontarf, New South Wales, Australia
- Height: 192 cm (6 ft 4 in)

Sport
- Country: Australia
- Sport: Rowing
- Club: Sydney University Boat Club
- Coached by: Mark Prater
Medal record
Men's rowing
Representing Australia
World Championships
Bronze medal – third place	2022 Račice	Eight

William O'Shannessy (born 28 August 1999) is an Australian representative rower. He has represented at underage and senior World Championships and won a bronze medal at the 2022 World Championships.

== Club and state rowing ==
O'Shannessy was educated and took up rowing at St Joseph's College, Hunters Hill in Sydney. His senior club rowing has been from the Sydney University Boat Club. He first made state selection for New South Wales in the 2018 men's youth eight which contested and won the Noel F Wilkinson Trophy at the Interstate Regatta within the Australian Rowing Championships. He made a second New South Wales youth eight appearance in 2019.

In 2021 O'Shannessy moved into the New South Wales senior eight to contest the King's Cup at the Interstate Regatta within the Australian Rowing Championships In 2022 and 2023 O'Shannessy rowed in the New South Wales eights which won the King's Cup.

At the 2023 Australian Rowing Championships he won the open coxless four national title in an all SUBC crew.

== International representative rowing ==
O'Shannessy made his Australian representative debut in a coxless four at the 2019 U23 World Rowing Championships in Sarasota Florida. They finished ninth overall.

O'Shannessy was selected in the Australian senior team for the 2022 international season and the 2022 World Rowing Championships. He rowed in the six seat the Australian men's eight to a silver medal placings at the World Rowing Cups III in July 2022. At the 2022 World Rowing Championships at Racize, O'Shannessy took to the seven seat. The eight won through their repechage to make the A final where they raced to a third place and a World Championship bronze medal.

In March 2023 O'Shannessy was again selected in the Australian senior men's sweep-oar squad for the 2023 international season.
