= Hannes Ocik =

German rower (born 1991)

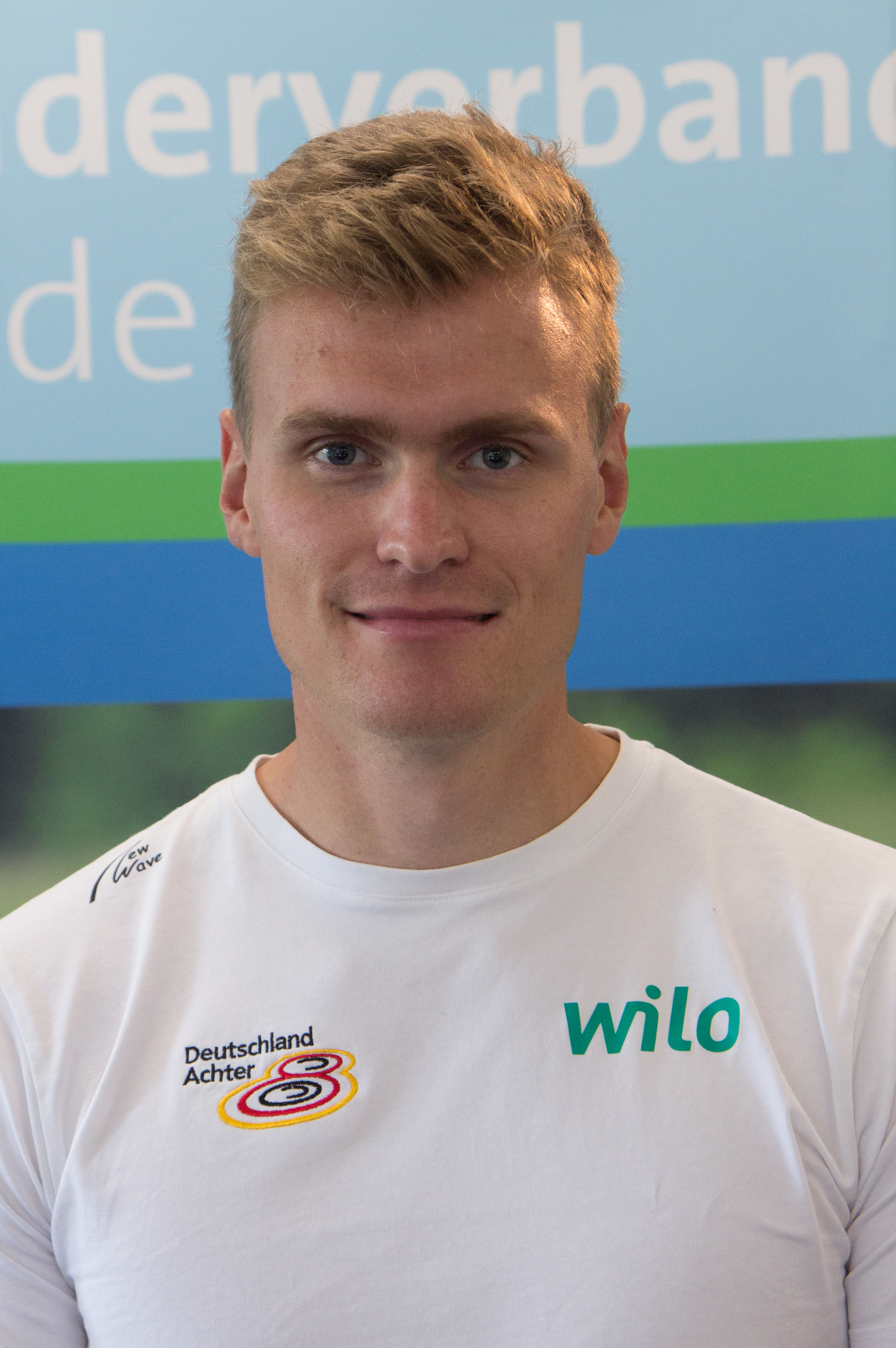
- Ocik in 2017

Personal information
- Nationality: German
- Born: 8 June 1991 (age 35) Rostock, Germany
- Height: 1.90 m (6 ft 3 in)
- Weight: 91 kg (201 lb)

Sport
- Country: Germany
- Sport: Rowing
- Event: Eight
- Club: Schweriner RG
Medal record
Men's rowing
Representing Germany
Olympic Games
Silver medal – second place	2016 Rio de Janeiro	Eight
Silver medal – second place	2020 Tokyo	Eight
World Championships
Gold medal – first place	2017 Sarasota	Eight
Gold medal – first place	2018 Plovdiv	Eight
Gold medal – first place	2019 Ottensheim	Eight
Silver medal – second place	2013 Chungju	Eight
Silver medal – second place	2015 Aiguebelette-le-lac	Eight
European Championships
Gold medal – first place	2013 Seville	Eight
Gold medal – first place	2015 Poznań	Eight
Gold medal – first place	2016 Brandenburg an der Havel	Eight
Gold medal – first place	2017 Račice	Eight
Gold medal – first place	2018 Glasgow	Eight
Gold medal – first place	2019 Lucerne	Eight
Silver medal – second place	2024 Szeged	Eight

Hannes Ocik (born 8 June 1991) is a German representative rower. He is a three-time world champion, twice an Olympic silver medallist and a five time gold medal winner at European Rowing Championships in the German senior men's eight — the Deutschlandachter. He stroked the German eight consistently from 2015 including their three world championship wins during their dominant period from 2017 to 2019. He was also at stroke at the 2017 World Rowing Cup II when the Deutschlandachter set a world's best time of 5.18.68, which was still the standing world mark as of 2021.

At the 2016 Summer Olympics in Rio de Janeiro, he stroked the German men's eight in their silver medal win. He was selected in the German Olympic rowing squad for Tokyo 2021 and stroked the German men's eight to an Olympic silver medal at his second Olympic appearance.

== Representative rowing career ==
Ocik's representative debut for Germany came in 2009 when he was selected to row in the men's junior eight at the World Junior Rowing Championships in Brive-la Gaillarde. They won their final and a world junior championship title In 2010 Ocik raced at the World Rowing U23 Championships, he stroked a coxed four which won the silver medal. Ocik and two other members of that four stayed together in 2011 and rowing as a coxless four won the gold and a U23 world title at the World Rowing U23 Championships in Amsterdam. In 2012 Ocik still qualified in the U23 division and with Paul Heinrich he took a coxless pair to the U23 World Championships in Lithuania and brought home a bronze medal.

2013 saw Ocik move into the German senior squad and he was one of the four new oarsman seated in the Deutschlandachter when it was rebuilt after the 2012 London Olympics. He raced in the eight at the European Championships, a World Cup and then at the 2013 World Rowing Championships in South Korea when they were beaten out by Great Britain and took a silver medal. In 2014 he did not race for Germany but in 2015 he was back and secured the stroke seat in the eight. He led the crew to podium finishes at three European regattas that season and then to the 2015 World Rowing Championships in Aiguebelette where for the third straight year the Germans were nosed out by a narrow margin to Great Britain. In the lead-up to Rio 2016 with Ocik still as the stroke man, the Deutschlandachter again finished either first or second at each regatta in the international season. In Rio the German crew won their heat but in the final were again beaten by Great Britain and a 1.33 second margin. Ocik was now an Olympic silver medallist.

In 2017 Ocik, Malte Jakschik, Richard Schmidt, and coxswain Martin Sauer were the only members of the German Olympic eight who rowed on. The eight was rebuilt around these senior men in the stern end. Five new oarsmen were added and they dominated the 2017 season, winning gold at the European Championships, two World Rowing Cups and ultimately at the 2017 World Rowing Championships in Sarasota, Florida where the German eight were crowned as world champions. In June 2017 at the World Rowing Cup II in Poznan they set a new world's best time for the eight, taking 0.67 seconds off a 2012 mark that had been set by Canada. The German crew with every man holding the same seat, continued their European and world dominance throughout 2018 winning at three World Rowing Cups, the 2018 European Championships and then defending their world title at the 2018 World Rowing Championships in Plovdiv. There were a handful of changes to the German eight in 2019 but Ocik remained as the paceman for another successful international season culminating in his third successive world championship title at the 2019 World Rowing Championships in Ottensheim.

Their 2019 performances qualified that boat for Tokyo 2020 where they rowed to a silver medal.

== Personal life ==
Ocik is a policeman employed by the Mecklenburg-Western Pomerania State Police. For his 2016 Olympic silver medal achievement he was awarded the Silver Laurel Leaf by German Federal President Joachim Gauck in November 2016.
