= Daniel Miklasevich =

American rower

Personal information
- Nationality: American
- Born: July 17, 1997 (age 29)

Sport
- Sport: Rowing

Daniel Miklasevich (born July 17, 1997) is an American rower. He competed in the men's eight event at the 2020 Summer Olympics.
