= Alexander Richards =

American rower

Personal information
- Nationality: American
- Born: August 12, 1995 (age 31)

Sport
- Sport: Rowing

Alexander Richards (born August 12, 1995) is an American rower. He competed in the men's eight event at the 2020 Summer Olympics, placing fourth.
