= Maarten Hurkmans =

Dutch rower

Personal information
- Nationality: Dutch
- Born: 29 August 1997 (age 28)

Sport
- Country: Netherlands
- Sport: Rowing
- Event: Eight

Achievements and titles
- Olympic finals: Tokyo 2020 M8+
Medal record
World Championships
Silver medal – second place	2019 Ottensheim	Eight
European Championships
Silver medal – second place	2018 Glasgow	Eight

Maarten Hurkmans (born 29 August 1997) is a Dutch rower.

He won a medal at the 2019 World Rowing Championships. He came out as bisexual in June 2020.
