= Dan Williamson =

New Zealand rower (born 2000)

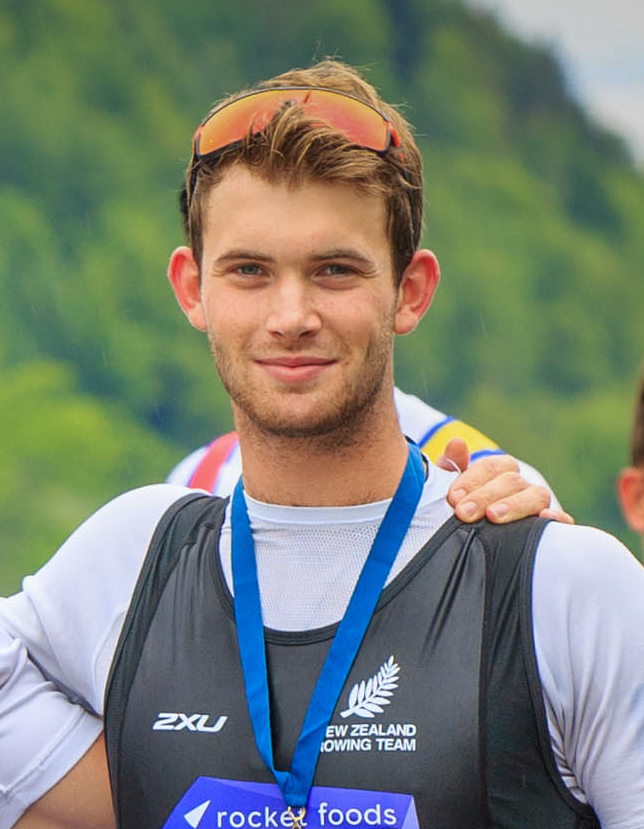

Personal information
- Full name: Daniel Hunter Williamson
- Born: 30 March 2000 (age 26) Auckland, New Zealand
- Education: Yale University
- Height: 6 ft 6 in (198 cm)

Sport
- Country: New Zealand
- Sport: Rowing
- Club: Auckland Rowing Club
Medal record
Men's rowing
Representing New Zealand
Olympic Games
| Gold medal – first place | 2020 Tokyo | Eight |

Daniel Hunter Williamson (born 30 March 2000) is an Olympic champion New Zealand rower.

== Early life ==
Williamson was born on 30 March 2000, in Auckland and grew up in Beachlands, an outer suburb of Auckland. He attended Howick College, where he took up rowing in 2014. In the following year, he began attending King's College. He was an avid athlete, but his limbs were growing fast. He had to quit soccer due to chronic shin splints. This prompted young Daniel to take up rowing.

== Rowing career ==
At age 14, Dan's rowing career began at Counties Manakau Rowing Club with encouragement from his best friend's mother. He spent his first year rowing for Counties and Howick College.

Before attending Yale University, Daniel was the 2017 NZ National Champion in U18 2-, U18 4x+, U17 4x+ and he won Bronze in the U17 4+. At the 2017 World Rowing Championships, he won Silver in the M4-. He was also named the 2017 Kings College Sportsman of the year.

In 2018, Williamson was the NZ National Champion in U20 2-, U22 2-, U22 4-, and he won Bronze in the premier 8+. He also won bronze at the 2018 World Rowing U23 Championships in M4-.

In his first year at Yale, he sat in the stroke seat in the 1V to help win gold at the 2019 IRA Nationals. He also helped the Yale 1v to win Eastern Sprints that year.

He won gold in the men's eight event at the 2020 Summer Olympics.

In his final year at Yale, Williamson was named the recipient of the William Neely Mallory Award, the most prestigious athletic award given to a senior male at Yale. The Mallory Award is presented to the senior man who on the field of play and in life at Yale best represents the highest ideals of American sportsmanship and Yale tradition.
