= Conor Harrity =

American rower

Personal information
- Born: September 3, 1994 (age 31) Boston, Massachusetts, U.S.

Sport
- Sport: Rowing

Conor Harrity (born September 3, 1994) is an American rower. He competed in the men's eight event at the 2020 Summer Olympics, placing fourth.
