= Malte Jakschik =

German rower (born 1993)

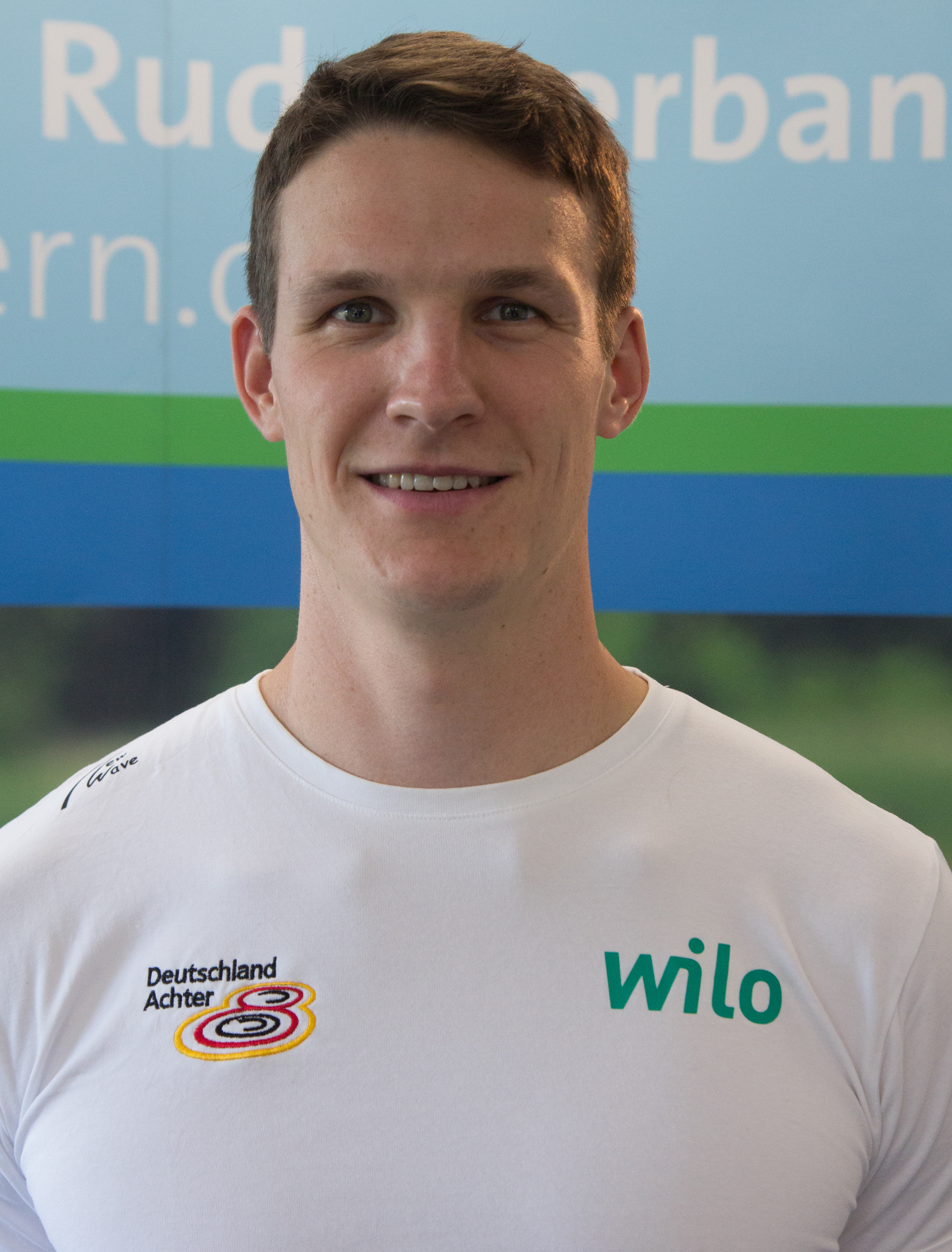
- Jakschik in 2017

Personal information
- Nationality: German
- Born: 3 August 1993 (age 32) Bonn, Germany
- Height: 1.93 m (6 ft 4 in)
- Weight: 88 kg (194 lb)

Sport
- Country: Germany
- Sport: Rowing
- Event: Eight
- Club: Rauxel RV
Medal record
Men's rowing
Representing Germany
Olympic Games
Silver medal – second place	2016 Rio de Janeiro	Eight
Silver medal – second place	2020 Tokyo	Eight
World Championships
Gold medal – first place	2017 Sarasota	Eight
Gold medal – first place	2018 Plovdiv	Eight
Gold medal – first place	2019 Ottensheim	Eight
Silver medal – second place	2014 Amsterdam	Eight
Silver medal – second place	2015 Aiguebelette	Eight
European Championships
Gold medal – first place	2014 Belgrade	Eight
Gold medal – first place	2015 Poznań	Eight
Gold medal – first place	2016 Brandenburg	Eight
Gold medal – first place	2017 Račice	Eight
Gold medal – first place	2018 Glasgow	Eight
Gold medal – first place	2019 Lucerne	Eight
Bronze medal – third place	2013 Seville	Coxless four
World Junior Championships
Gold medal – first place	2011 Dorney	Coxless four

Malte Jakschik (born 3 August 1993) is a German former representative rower. He was a three time world champion, a two time Olympic silver medallist and held a seat in the German senior men's eight — the Deutschlandachter — constantly from 2014 to 2021. At the 2016 Summer Olympics in Rio de Janeiro, he rowed in Germany's men's eight which won the silver medal. He rowed at six when the Deutschlandachter at the 2017 World Rowing Cup II set a world's best time of 5.18.68, which was still the standing world mark as of 2021. He rowed in the German men's eight at Tokyo 2021 and won a second Olympic silver medal.

== International rowing career ==
Jakschik's representative debut for Germany came in 2010 when he was selected in the German junior men's eight which won a silver medal at the World Junior Rowing Championships in Roudnice. In 2011 he rowed in a coxless four at the World Junior Rowing Championships at Eton Dorney in a crew which included Johannes Weißenfeld with whom he would later win three senior world championships. They rowed to a first placing and a junior world championship.

In 2013 Jakschik moved into the German senior squad and a coxless four which finished in overall twelfth place at the 2013 World Rowing Championships in Chungju, South Korea. 2014 saw Jakschik secure a seat in the German men's eight and he became a constant fixture in that boat for the next seven years. The 2014 eight was successful at the European Championships and the World Rowing Cup II and then at the 2014 World Rowing Championships in Amsterdam finished 0.66 seconds behind Great Britain and brought home a silver medal.

2015 saw the German eight continue their Olympic campaign build with a win at the European Championships and silver at two World Rowing Cups. When they again met Great Britain at the 2015 World Rowing Championships in Aiguebelette the Germans with Jakschik in the two seat, had to again settle for the silver medal with the finishing margin this time being 0.18 seconds. In the lead-up to Rio 2016 Germany again finished either first or second at each regatta in the international season. In Rio the German crew won their heat but in the final were again beaten by Great Britain with a 1.33 second margin. Jakschik was now an Olympic silver medallist and along with rest of the crew he was awarded the Silbernes Lorbeerblatt (Silver Laurel Leaf), Germany's highest sports award, for the achievement.

In 2017 Jakschik, Richard Schmidt, the stroke Hannes Ocik and coxswain Martin Sauer were the only members of the German Olympic eight who rowed on. The eight was rebuilt around the stern three of Ocik, Schmidt & Jakschik. He remained throughout their dominant season campaign, winning gold at the European Championships, two World Rowing Cups and ultimately at the 2017 World Rowing Championships in Sarasota, Florida where the German eight were crowned as world champions. In June 2017 at the World Rowing Cup II in Poznan they set a new world's best time for the eight, taking 0.67 seconds off a 2012 mark that had been set by Canada. The German crew with every man holding the same seat, continued their European and world dominance throughout 2018 winning at three World Rowing Cups, the 2018 European Championships and then defending their world title at the 2018 World Rowing Championships in Plovdiv. There were a handful of changes to the German eight in 2019 but Jakschik remained at six for another successful international season culminating in his third successive world championship title at the 2019 World Rowing Championships in Ottensheim.

Their 2019 performances qualified that boat for Tokyo 2020. By the time of the 2021 selections for those delayed Olympics, Jakschik was still in the crew and set to make his second Olympic rowing appearance. At that Tokyo 2021 Olympic regatta he rowed at six in the German eight to an Olympic silver medal.
