= Emanuele Liuzzi =

Italian rower (born 1990)

Personal information
- Born: 22 December 1990 (age 35) Naples, Italy

Sport
- Sport: Rowing
- Club: Fiamme Oro
Medal record
Men's rowing
Representing Italy
World Championships
Bronze medal – third place	2017 Sarasota	Eight

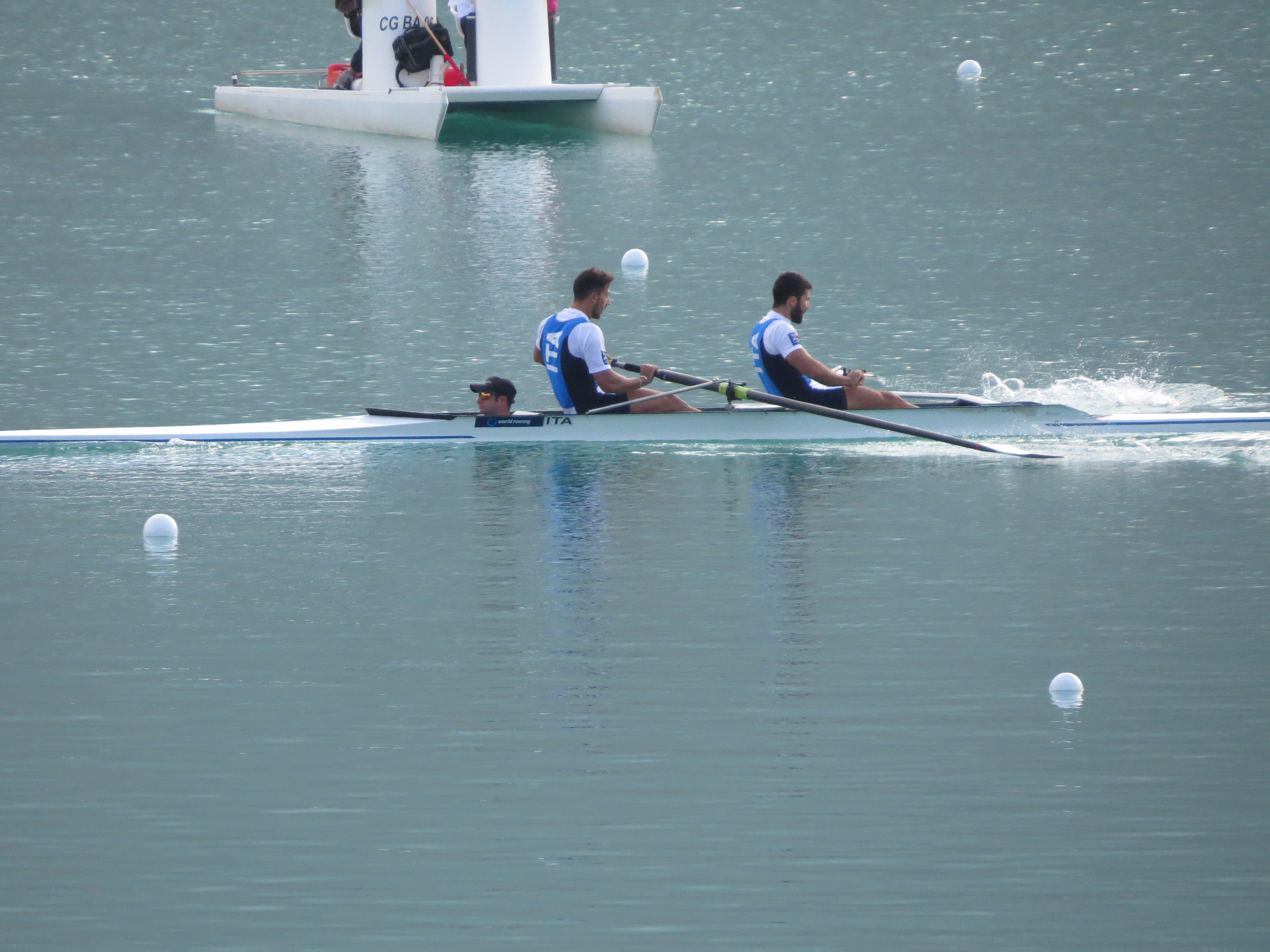
2015 World Championships: Italian boat in the B final of the M2+ event

Emanuele Liuzzi (born 22 December 1990) is an Italian rower. He competed in the men's eight event at the 2016 Summer Olympics.
