= Benjamin Coombs =

Australian rower

Personal information
- Born: 16 March 1992 (age 34)

Sport
- Country: Australia
- Sport: Rowing

Achievements and titles
- National finals: King's Cup 2015-21
Medal record
Men's rowing
Representing Australia

Benjamin Coombs (born 16 March 1992) is an Australian former representative rower. He was a three-time Australian national champion, an underage medallist at World Championships and represented at the 2017 World Rowing Championships.

== Club and state rowing ==
Coombs was raised in Melbourne and took up rowing while at Melbourne Grammar. He attended Columbia University on a rowing scholarship and participated in their rowing program from 2011 to 2014. On return to Australia after his studies, his senior club rowing was from the UTS Haberfield Rowing Club.

Coombs made his state representative debut for Victoria in the 2015 men's senior eight which contested and won the King's Cup at the annual Interstate Regatta. He rowed in further Victorian King's Cup eights in 2016 (gold), 2017 (silver), 2018 (silver), 2019 (silver) and 2021 (gold).

== International representative rowing ==
Coombs made his Australian representative debut in 2011 while based in the US when he was selected in the men's coxed four to race at the 2011 U23 World Rowing Championships in Amsterdam. That crew placed seventh overall. He was again picked in the U23 coxed four for the 2013 U23 World Championships when they finished in overall fourth place in Linz, Austria. For the 2014 U23 World Championships in Varese, the entire Australian men's eight was seated with US based Australian rowers and Coombs raced in the six seat of that crew to a silver medal.

In 2017 made the Australian senior squad and was vying for a seat in the men's eight during the European racing season. He was seated at four in the eight when they finished in 4th place at World Rowing Cup II. Then at WRC III he raced in the coxed pair with Nathan Bowden and James Rook to a silver medal and also in a coxless pair to 13th place. Coombs was back in the Australian men's eight when they finished eight at the 2017 World Rowing Championships. It was his first and last senior Australian representative appearance at World Championships.
