= Stuart Sim (rower) =

Australian rowing cox

Personal information
- Born: 17 February 1993 (age 33) Kew, Victoria, Australia
- Education: Scotch College, Melbourne, University of Washington
- Years active: 2011 - current
- Height: 174 cm (5 ft 9 in)

Sport
- Country: Australia
- Sport: Rowing
- Event: Men's eight (M8+)
- Club: Melbourne University Boat Club
- Coached by: Rhett Ayliffe

Achievements and titles
- Olympic finals: Tokyo 2020 M8+
- National finals: King's Cup 2021

Stuart Sim (born 17 February 1993) is an Australian representative rowing coxswain. He is an Olympian and a national champion, has represented at world championships and was a world junior champion in 2011. He rowed in the Australian men's eight at the Tokyo 2020 Olympics.

== Club and state rowing ==
Raised in Melbourne, Sim was schooled at Scotch College where he took up rowing. He coxed the Scotch first VIII to victories in 2010 and 2011 APS Schools Head of the River (Victoria), as had his father Michael Sim in 1978 and his grandfather Bob in 1941. His Australian club rowing has been from the Melbourne University Boat Club.

From 2013 to 2017 Sim attended the University of Washington where he coxed the men's senior eight at various varsity regattas, including a IRA championship win in 2015. In Australia, Sim's representative debut for his state of Victoria came in 2021 when he was selected in the Victorian men's senior eight which contested and won the Kings Cup.

== International representative rowing ==
Sim was first selected to represent Australia in a coxed four at the 2011 World Rowing Junior Championships at Eton Dorney. That Australian four, stroked by Alexander Hill won gold and a world junior championship title. At the World Rowing U23 Championships in Linz in 2013 Sim steered an Australian coxed four to an overall fourth place. For the 2014 World U23 Championships in Varese, Sim steered the Australian men's eight to a silver medal placing.

Ahead of the 2016 Olympics the incumbent Australian men's coxswain was David Webster. Webster steered the Australian men's eight at the 2015 World Rowing Cup III in Lucerne and at the Olympic qualifications, the 2015 World Rowing Championships in Aiguebelette, France but they did not qualify for the 2016 Summer Olympics at these regattas. Following the Russian doping scandal of 2016, last minute Olympic berths opened up and when a selected Australian men's senior eight made a last ditch Olympic qualification attempt in May 2016 at Lucerne, Sim was in the stern. They again missed Olympic qualification.

Kendall Brodie coxed the Australian men's eight in their world championship and Henley campaigns from 2017 to 2019 but by the time of 2021 national team selections for the delayed Tokyo Olympics, Sim had regained the coxswain's seat in the eight, which had qualified for the Olympics on its 2019 international performances. In Tokyo the Australian men's eight placed fourth in their heat, fourth in the repechage and sixth in the Olympic A final. Had they repeated their repechage time of 5:25:06 they would have won the silver medal.
