= Eline Berger =

Dutch rower (born 1997)

Personal information
- Nationality: Dutch
- Born: 28 March 1997 (age 27); Heythuysen, Netherlands

Sport
- Sport: Rowing

Eline Berger (born 28 March 1997) is a Dutch coxswain. She competed in the men's eight event at the 2020 Summer Olympics as cox for the team.
