= 2017 World Rowing Championships – Men's coxed pair =

Men's coxed pair at the 2017 World Rowing Championships
- Venue: Nathan Benderson Park
- Location: Sarasota, United States
- Dates: 24–29 September
- Competitors: 21 from 7 nations
- Winning time: 6:54.80

Medalists
gold medal	Adrián Juhász; Béla Simon; Andrea Vanda Kolláth	Hungary
silver medal	Darcy Wruck; Angus Widdicombe; James Rook	Australia
bronze medal	Malte Grossmann; Finn Schröder; Jonas Wiesen	Germany

The men's coxed pair competition at the 2017 World Rowing Championships in Sarasota took place in Nathan Benderson Park.

== Schedule ==
The schedule was as follows:

Date	Time	Round
Sunday 24 September 2017	10:00	Heats
Tuesday 26 September 2017	11:43	Repechage
Friday 29 September 2017	11:45	Final

All times are Eastern Daylight Time (UTC-4)

== Results ==
=== Heats ===
Heat winners advanced directly to the final. The remaining boats were sent to the repechage.

==== Heat 1 ====
Rank	Rowers	Country	Time	Notes
1	Thomas Ford; Timothy Clarke; Harry Brightmore	Great Britain	6:59.16	F
2	Thibault Colard; Thomas Baroukh; Thibaut Hacot	France	7:03.50	R
3	Jacopo Mancini; Vincenzo Abbagnale; Riccardo Zoppini	Italy	7:05.15	R
4	Jaime Lara; Marco Sardelli; Tomas Jurado	Spain	7:15.53	R

==== Heat 2 ====
Rank	Rowers	Country	Time	Notes
1	Darcy Wruck; Angus Widdicombe; James Rook	Australia	6:59.41	F
2	Malte Grossmann; Finn Schröder; Jonas Wiesen	Germany	6:59.88	R
3	Adrián Juhász; Béla Simon; Andrea Vanda Kolláth	Hungary	7:18.19	R

=== Repechage ===
The four fastest boats advanced to the final. The remaining boat took no further part in the competition.

Rank	Rowers	Country	Time	Notes
1	Malte Grossmann; Finn Schröder; Jonas Wiesen	Germany	6:58.38	F
2	Adrián Juhász; Béla Simon; Andrea Vanda Kolláth	Hungary	7:00.85	F
3	Jacopo Mancini; Vincenzo Abbagnale; Riccardo Zoppini	Italy	7:01.43	F
4	Jaime Lara; Marco Sardelli; Tomas Jurado	Spain	7:01.81	F
5	Thibault Colard; Thomas Baroukh; Thibaut Hacot	France	7:02.15	

=== Final ===
The final determined the rankings.

Rank	Rowers	Country	Time
1st place, gold medalist(s)	Adrián Juhász; Béla Simon; Andrea Vanda Kolláth	Hungary	6:54.80
2nd place, silver medalist(s)	Darcy Wruck; Angus Widdicombe; James Rook	Australia	6:56.60
3rd place, bronze medalist(s)	Malte Grossmann; Finn Schröder; Jonas Wiesen	Germany	6:58.37
4	Thomas Ford; Timothy Clarke; Harry Brightmore	Great Britain	7:01.61
5	Jacopo Mancini; Vincenzo Abbagnale; Riccardo Zoppini	Italy	7:08.69
6	Jaime Lara; Marco Sardelli; Tomas Jurado	Spain	7:13.04
