= Rowing at the 2020 Summer Olympics – Men's eight =

Men's eight at the Games of the XXXII Olympiad
- Olympic rowing
- Venue: Sea Forest Waterway
- Dates: 24–30 July 2021
- Competitors: 63 from 7 nations

Medalists
1st place, gold medalist(s)		Tom Mackintosh; Hamish Bond; Tom Murray; Michael Brake; Dan Williamson; Phillip Wilson; Shaun Kirkham; Matt Macdonald; Sam Bosworth	New Zealand
2nd place, silver medalist(s)		Johannes Weißenfeld; Laurits Follert; Olaf Roggensack; Torben Johannesen; Jakob Schneider; Malte Jakschik; Richard Schmidt; Hannes Ocik; Martin Sauer	Germany
3rd place, bronze medalist(s)		Josh Bugajski; Jacob Dawson; Thomas George; Moe Sbihi; Charles Elwes; Oliver Wynne-Griffith; James Rudkin; Thomas Ford; Henry Fieldman	Great Britain

The men's eight event at the 2020 Summer Olympics took place from 25 to 30 July 2021 at the Sea Forest Waterway. 63 rowers and coxswains from 7 nations competed.

== Background ==
This was the 28th appearance of the event, which was not held at the first Games in 1896 (when bad weather forced the cancellation of all rowing events) but has been held at every Summer Olympics since 1900.

The German eight won all three World Championships held in this event after the 2016 Games.

No nations made their debut in the event, with all 7 qualifying places going to nations that have previously competed. The United States qualified and made their 25th appearance, most among nations.

== Qualification ==
Each National Olympic Committee (NOC) has been limited to a single boat in the event since 1920. There are 7 qualifying places in the men's eight:

- 5 from the 2019 World Championship (Germany, the Netherlands, Great Britain, Australia, and the United States)
- 2 from the final qualification regatta (New Zealand and Romania)

The COVID-19 pandemic delayed many of the events for qualifying for rowing.

== Competition format ==
This rowing event features nine-person boats, with eight rowers and a coxswain. It is a sweep rowing event, with the rowers each having one oar (and thus each rowing on one side). The competition consists of multiple rounds. The course uses the 2000 metres distance that became the Olympic standard in 1912.

For the first time at the Olympics, the coxswain position was open to any gender.

The competition used the three-round, single-final format used (unexpectedly) in 2016, when the number of teams was reduced from the expected 8 to 7 due to Russia's exclusion in the doping scandal. For 2020, the 7-boat field was deliberate. There were two heats, with the winner of each advancing directly to the final and the remaining five boats competing in the repechage. The top four in the repechage also advanced to the final; only the last-place boat was eliminated (with an overall rank of 7th place). The final determined the medals as well as 4th to 6th places.

== Schedule ==
The competition was held over six days. Times given are session start times; multiple rowing events might have races during a session.

All times are Japan Standard Time (UTC+9)

Date	Time	Round
Saturday, 24 July 2021	12:00	Heats
Wednesday, 28 July 2021	12:50	Repechage
Friday, 30 July 2021	10:25	Final

== Results ==
=== Heats ===
The winners of each heat qualified for the final, while the remainder went to the repechage.

==== Heat 1 ====
Rank	Lane	Rower	Nation	Time	Notes
1	1	Weißenfeld; Follert; Roggensack; Johannesen; Schneider; Jakschik; Schmidt; Ocik; Sauer (c)	Germany	5:28.95	Q
2	4	Davison; Best; Miklasevich; Hack; Richards; Mead; Harrity; Corrigan; Venonsky (c)	United States	5:30.57	R
3	2	Chioseaua; Lehaci; Radu; Bejan; Aicoboae; Adam; Arteni-Fîntînariu; Huc; Munteanu (c)	Romania	5:39.84	R
4	3	Lavery; O'Brien; Booth; Keenan; Purnell; Masters; Dawson; Widdicombe; Sim (c)	Australia	5:43.66	R

==== Heat 2 ====
Rank	Lane	Rower	Nation	Time	Notes
1	2	van den Ende; Knab; Tissen; van Dorp; Hurkmans; Schwarz; Versluis; Lücken; Berger (c)	Netherlands	5:30.66	Q
2	1	Mackintosh; Bond; Murray; Brake; Williamson; Kirkham; Macdonald; Wilson; Bosworth (c)	New Zealand	5:32.11	R
3	3	Bugajski; Dawson; George; Sbihi; Elwes; Wynne-Griffith; Rudkin; Ford; Fieldman (c)	Great Britain	5:34.40	R

=== Repechage ===
The first four advanced to Final A.

Rank	Lane	Rower	Nation	Time	Notes
1	3	Mackintosh; Bond; Murray; Brake; Williamson; Wilson; Kirkham; Macdonald; Bosworth (c)	New Zealand	5:22.04	Q
2	4	Bugajski; Dawson; George; Sbihi; Elwes; Wynne-Griffith; Rudkin; Ford; Fieldman (c)	Great Britain	5:23.32	Q
3	2	Davison; Best; Miklasevich; Hack; Richards; Mead; Harrity; Corrigan; Venonsky (c)	United States	5:23.43	Q
4	5	Lavery; O'Brien; Booth; Keenan; Purnell; Masters; Dawson; Widdicombe; Sim (c)	Australia	5:25.06	Q
5	1	Chioseaua; Lehaci; Radu; Bejan; Aicoboae; Adam; Arteni-Fîntînariu; Huc; Munteanu (c)	Romania	5:27.14	

=== Final ===
Rank	Lane	Rower	Nation	Time	Notes
1st place, gold medalist(s)	2	Tom Mackintosh; Hamish Bond; Tom Murray; Michael Brake; Dan Williamson; Phillip Wilson; Shaun Kirkham; Matt Macdonald; Sam Bosworth (c)	New Zealand	5:24.64	
2nd place, silver medalist(s)	3	Johannes Weißenfeld; Laurits Follert; Olaf Roggensack; Torben Johannesen; Jakob Schneider; Malte Jakschik; Richard Schmidt; Hannes Ocik; Martin Sauer (c)	Germany	5:25.60	
3rd place, bronze medalist(s)	5	Josh Bugajski Jacob Dawson Thomas George Moe Sbihi Charles Elwes Oliver Wynne-Griffith James Rudkin Thomas Ford Henry Fieldman (c)	Great Britain	5:25.73	
4	1	Ben Davison; Justin Best; Daniel Miklasevich; Austin Hack; Alexander Richards; Nick Mead; Conor Harrity; Liam Corrigan; Julian Venonsky (c)	United States	5:26.75	
5	4	Bjorn van den Ende; Ruben Knab; Jasper Tissen; Simon van Dorp; Maarten Hurkmans; Bram Schwarz; Mechiel Versluis; Robert Lücken; Eline Berger (c)	Netherlands	5:27.96	
6	6	Nicholas Lavery; Joseph O'Brien; Josh Booth; Simon Keenan; Nicholas Purnell; Timothy Masters; Angus Dawson; Angus Widdicombe; Stuart Sim (c)	Australia	5:36.23	
