= Jackson Kench =

Australian rower (born 1999)

Personal information
- Nationality: Australian
- Born: 19 March 1999 (age 27) Sydney, Australia
- Education: The University of Sydney
- Height: 191 cm (6 ft 3 in)

Sport
- Country: Australia
- Sport: Rowing
- Club: Sydney University Boat Club
Medal record
Men's rowing
Representing Australia
World Championships
Bronze medal – third place	2022 Račice	Eight

Jackson Kench (born 19 March 1999) is an Australian representative rower. He has represented at underage and senior world championships and won a bronze medal at the 2022 World Championships.

== Club and state rowing ==
Kench was educated at Sydney Church of England Grammar School where he took up rowing. His Australian senior club rowing has been from the Sydney University Boat Club.

Kench first made state selection for New South Wales in the 2018 men's youth eight which contested and won the Noel F Wilkinson Trophy at the Interstate Regatta within the Australian Rowing Championships. He made a second New South Wales youth eight appearance in 2019.

In 2022 Kench moved into the New South Wales senior eight which won the King's Cup at the Interstate Regatta within the Australian Rowing Championships In 2023 he again rowed in a victorious New South Wales King's Cup eight.

At the 2023 Australian Rowing Championships he won the open coxless four national title in an all SUBC crew.

== International representative rowing ==
Kench made his Australian representative debut in a quad scull at the 2016 World Junior Rowing Championships in Rotterdam. They finished twelfth overall. The following year Kench was again in the Australian quad at the Junior World Championships in Trakai. They finished ninth. Kench moved into the U23 Australian men's eight in 2019, racing in that boat to a sixth place finish at the 2019 U23 World Rowing Championships in Sarasota, Florida.

Kench was selected in the Australian senior team for the 2022 international season and the 2022 World Rowing Championships. He rowed in the Australian men's eight to silver medal placings at each of the World Rowing Cups in June and July 2022. At the 2022 World Rowing Championships at Racize, Kench moved into the stroke seat of the eight. The crew won through their repechage to make the A final where they raced to a third place and a World Championship bronze medal.

In March 2023 Kench was again selected in the Australian senior men's sweep-oar squad for the 2023 international season. At the Rowing World Cup II in Varese Italy, Kench stroked the Australian men's eight. In the final after a slow start they rowed through most of the field to take second place and a silver medal.
