= Julian Venonsky =

American rower

Personal information
- Nationality: American
- Born: October 15, 1993 (age 32)

Sport
- Sport: Rowing

Julian Venonsky (born October 15, 1993) is an American rower. He competed in the men's eight event at the 2020 Summer Olympics. He is openly gay.
