= Paolo Perino =

Italian rower

Personal information
- National team: Italy
- Born: 10 March 1988 (age 38) Genoa, Italy
- Height: 2.01 m (6 ft 7 in)
- Weight: 88 kg (194 lb)

Sport
- Sport: Rowing
- Club: G.S. Fiamme Gialle
- Start activity: 2000
Medal record
Event	1st	2nd	3rd
World Championships	0	1	1
European Championships	0	1	1
Total	0	2	2

Paolo Perino (born 10 March 1988) is an Italian male rower, medal winner at senior level at the World Rowing Championships and European Rowing Championships.
