= Jonas Wiesen =

German coxswain (born 1996)

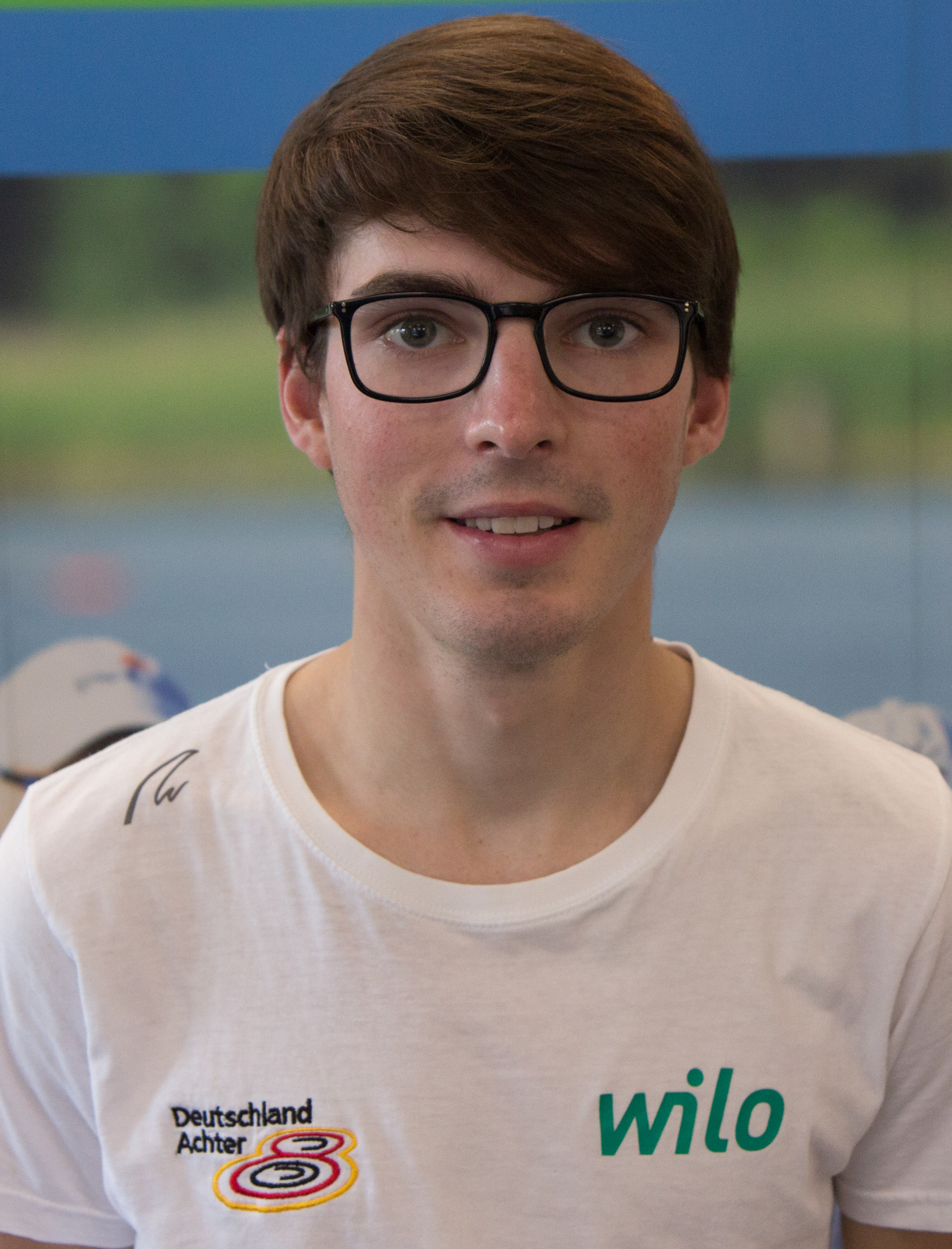
- Wiesen in September 2017

Personal information
- Born: 18 July 1996 (age 30)
- Height: 169 cm (5 ft 7 in)
- Weight: 55 kg (121 lb)

Sport
- Sport: Rowing
Medal record
Men's rowing
Representing Germany
World Championships
Silver medal – second place	2013 Chungjiu	Coxed pair
Silver medal – second place	2015 Aiguebelette-le-lac	Coxed pair
Bronze medal – third place	2014 Amsterdam	Coxed pair
Bronze medal – third place	2017 Sarasota	Coxed pair
European Championships
Silver medal – second place	2024 Szeged	Eight
Silver medal – second place	2026 Varese	Eight

Jonas Wiesen (born 18 July 1996) is a German coxswain. He has won medals at several World Rowing Championships.
