= Tell It Like It Is (talk show) =

- Presented by: Cui Yongyuan (1996–2002); He Jing (2002–2009)
- Country of origin: China
- Original language: Chinese

Production
- Running time: 45 minutes

Original release
- Network: China Central Television
- Release: March 16, 1996 – September 26, 2009

Tell It Like It Is (Chinese: 实话实说; pinyin: Shí Huà Shí Shuō) was a Chinese television talk show broadcast by China Central Television. It premiered in 1996 as the first major talk show in mainland China and went off the air in 2009.

It was hosted by Cui Yongyuan from 1996 to 2002 and by He Jing from 2002 to 2009.
