= Cui Yongyuan =

Chinese TV host and professor

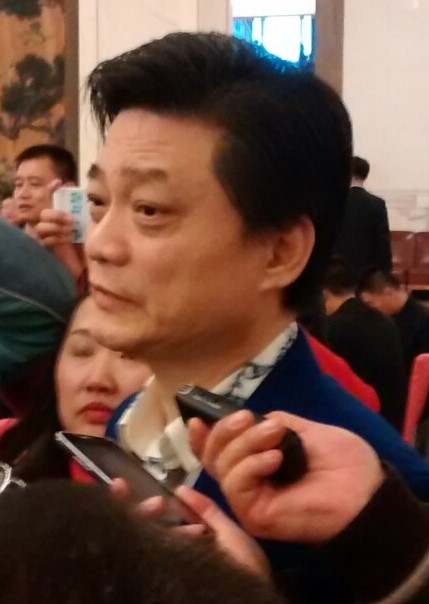
- Cui in 2017
- Born: 20 February 1963 (age 63); Tianjin, China
- Education: Communications University of China
- Occupations: CCTV Host (1996-2013); Professor at Communication University of China (2013-present); YouTuber (2020-present)
- Notable credit(s): Tell It Like It Is; Talk to Xiaocui; Thank the Heavens and the Earth you are here
- Website: www.weibo.com/cuiyongyuan (Weibo)

Cui Yongyuan (Chinese: 崔永元; pinyin: Cuī Yǒngyuán; born February 20, 1963) is a former Chinese TV host and professor at Communication University of China.

Cui rose to fame for hosting Tell It Like It Is on China Central Television (CCTV) from 1996 to 2002. His affable and natural sense of humour pioneered a brand of relaxed and unscripted presentation style that marked a departure from the rigid and staid nature of many Chinese talk shows. After a battle with depression, Cui returned to CCTV to host Talk with Xiao Cui from 2003 to 2009. From 2012 to 2013 Cui hosted the Chinese version of Thank God You Are Here. He left CCTV in 2013 to be a professor at his alma mater Communication University of China.

After leaving CCTV, Cui has been known as an anti-GMO food activist and whistleblower. In 2018, his feud with Feng Xiaogang over Cell Phone (2003), a film Cui claimed was an insinuation about his personal life, escalated when Feng announced a sequel, prompting Cui to expose the "yin-yang contracts" pervasive in the Chinese entertainment industry. His exposé led to the blacklisting of Cell Phone star Fan Bingbing, as well as an industry-wide tax crackdown and a prolonged downturn known in China as the "entertainment winter". In 2019, Cui helped Judge Wang Linqing allege China's Supreme People's Court of corruption in the "billion yuan mining rights case." After the authorities denied these allegations, Wang was convicted, and Cui was effectively banned from the Chinese internet. In 2020, Cui launched his YouTube channel.

== Biography ==
Ethnically Korean, Cui was born on February 20, 1963, in the Beichen District of Tianjin. Cui's parents were in the military. When Cui was four years old, the family moved to Beijing where Cui received his primary and secondary education, attending Liangxiang Elementary School, Fengtai No. 3 Primary School, and Beijing No.12 High School, before entering into the Communication University of China. After graduating in 1985, Cui began working for China Central Television as a reporter.

Starting in 1993, Cui has helped launch CCTV's flagship news program Oriental Horizon (东方时空). Since 1996 he started hosting Tell It Like It Is (实话实说), which was conceptualized as a Sunday supplement to Oriental Horizon. Soon after Tell it like it is gained a following in its own right, in large part due to his personality, and spurred a number of copycat shows in other networks. Beginning in 2001 Cui was diagnosed with clinical depression, which led him to quit Tell it like it is in 2002.

In 2002, Cui's team began making video recordings of the experiences of Chinese civilians and veterans during the Second Sino-Japanese War. These were used in the televised documentary My War of Resistance which aired in 2010.

Cui returned to CCTV to host Talk with Xiao Cui (小崔说事). Cui was named as one of the Top Ten Best Hosts of CCTV for 2005. In addition, during the 2007 National People's Congress he hosted a talk show where he met with regional Chinese leaders to discuss everyday issues of concern to the people, the first of its kind in the PRC.

Cui has made several appearances at the CCTV New Year's Gala. He appeared twice in skits featuring Zhao Benshan and Song Dandan entitled Yesterday, Today, and Tomorrow in 1999 and again in 2006. He also sang and danced with Taiwan actress Ruby Lin in 2000.

In 2012, Cui established the Cui Yongyuan Oral History Research Center at Communication University of China. He left CCTV the next year to be a professor at Communication University of China. In 2016, the center published a collection of oral accounts from the Second Sino-Japanese War.

In January 2015, Cui briefly returned to TV when he signed with Shanghai-based Dragon Television to host the program "Eyes on Dongfang" (东方眼), which, nevertheless, closed down after three months for unknown reasons. After his resignation from CCTV, from 2013 to 2019, Cui was mainly known as an online activist and whistleblower until he was blacklisted for his involvement in the "billion yuan mining rights case," where he collaborated with Judge Wang Linqing in alleging China's Supreme People's Court of corruption. After the ban on the Chinese Internet, Cui has been a YouTuber since 2020.

== Controversies ==
=== Anti-GMO campaign ===
In September 2013, Cui Yongyuan and Fang Zhouzi had an online debate on the commercialization of GMO foods. After that, Cui went to Japan and the US and conducted a private investigation on the consumption and regulations of GMO in those two countries. In 2014, Cui claimed that Fang operated an illegal trust fund and bought a luxurious house in California worth US$670,000 with money earned through deceitful and shady practices. Fang therefore sued him for slandering. The verdict was released on June 25, 2015, deciding that both parties are at fault and each should release apologies publicly to the other. Fang decided to appeal. Chinese-language media has cited fallout from the conflict as a reason Cui has decided to leave the state broadcaster for a teaching position at his alma mater Communications University of China.

On March 26, 2015, Cui gave a talk at Fudan University on the topic of GMO. The organizers tried to discourage students and faculty members from the Life Science Department from attending by not sending a public invitation, but Professor Lu Daru of the Genetics Institute got the news and challenged him on site during the Q&A session. Cui claimed that Lu did not have "the knowledge of broadcasting, and therefore does not qualify to debate him on the same level," and also declared that "us 'consensus front of journalists' thinks that your ('consensus front of scientific researchers', a phrase used by Lu earlier) claims (on GMO) is not well founded."

In July 2015, a Weibo user posted a parody fake-news stating that "French fries from both KFC and McDonald's are found to contain a potentially poisonous chemical called sodium chloride". Not knowing that sodium chloride is common salt, Cui fell for it and reblogged this as news and even featured this repost on his Weibo account with a sarcastic comment "This is not scientific, because medical research has not found even one case of people getting sick due to eating French fries from KFC or McDonald's. This is exactly the same as GMO!" He was soon ridiculed for his lack of common knowledge of chemistry due to this, and many questioned his basic skills in natural sciences.

=== Data security of China Record Corporation ===
On June 8, 2015, Cui posted on his Weibo that China Record Corporation has subcontracted the digitization of some historical documents to a Japanese company, which including the release of master copies to the contractor. Cui claimed that such act was in violation of regulations on data security and needed to be reported. China Record Corporation replied that the digitization work was done by a subsidiary company named Victory Records and Videos, with all involved being Chinese citizens.

=== Yin-yang contracts exposé ===
On May 10, 2018, Feng Xiaogang posted on Weibo a concept poster for Cell Phone 2, a sequel to his film Cell Phone (2003). On May 27, Cui, who has a feud with the crew of Cell Phone due to its insinuations about his real life, posted on Weibo a contract where Fan Bingbing is shown to be paid CN¥10 million. On May 28, Cui further alleged that another actor had signed two contracts for a four-day film shoot—one for CN¥10 million and the other for CN¥50 million—pocketing a total of CN¥60 million. Due to the smaller contract's amount matching Fan's revealed contract from the previous day, many incorrectly believed Cui referred to the same person with two days' revelations and was thus accusing Fan of tax evading. On May 29, Fan's studio denied the "yin-yang contracts" accusation. On June 3, China's tax authorities announced that they would investigate Fan's suspected case of tax evasion in light of Cui's posts. On October 3, Xinhua News Agency announced that Fan was ordered to pay about CN¥883 million in taxes and penalties for her tax evasion. Since the tax scandal, Fan has been largely blacklisted in mainland China, where her films and television works are prohibited from being released. Fan's case also triggered a tax audit crackdown and reforms in China's entertainment industry. In early 2019, Xinhua News Agency reported that, since October 2018, entertainment industry taxpayers had conducted self-inspections. By the end of 2018, CN¥11.747 billion in taxes had been declared, with CN¥11.553 billion already paid into the treasury.

=== Billion yuan mining rights case ===
In 2003, Yulin Kaiqilai Energy Investment Co. and Xi'an Geological Mineral Exploration and Development Institute signed an agreement to jointly explore a coalfield. After Kaiqilai discovered significant coal reserves, Xi'an Institute signed a new agreement with a third party, ignoring the original contract. Kaiqilai sued Xi'an Institute. In 2017, Kaiqilai won the lawsuit after a 12-year legal battle.

In late 2018, Cui brought the case, popularly known as the "billion yuan mining rights case" since, to public attention by alleging on Weibo that crucial case files had been "stolen" in 2016 during the Supreme People's Court's proceedings. Cui also suggested that Zhou Qiang, then Chief Justice and President of the Supreme People's Court, of colluding in the disappearance of the case files. Afterwards, China Times (Huaxia Shibao) released a video from Wang Linqing, a judge involved in the case. In the video, Wang confirmed the disappearance of the files and stated that he had made the recording to ensure his safety. The Supreme People's Court initially dismissed the allegations but later admitted the disappearance and announced an investigation. In February 2019, a joint investigation team led by the Central Political and Legal Affairs Commission concluded that the missing files had been stolen by Wang himself. In May, Cui issued a public apology for false whistleblowing and subsequently withdrew from the public eye. In 2022, Wang was sentenced to 14 years in prison and a fine of 1 million yuan for the crimes of taking bribes and illegally obtaining national secrets.
