= Angus Moore =

Australian rower

Personal information
- Nationality: Australian
- Born: 26 September 1992 (age 34)

Sport
- Country: Australia
- Sport: Rowing
- Club: Sydney Rowing Club

Achievements and titles
- National finals: King's Cup 2015,17,18,19.
Medal record
Representing Australia
World Championships
Silver medal – second place	2018 Plovdiv	Eight

Angus Moore (born 26 September 1992) is an Australian former representative rower. He was a three-time King's Cup winner, medalled at underage and senior world rowing championships and in 2018 won the Grand Challenge Cup at the Henley Royal Regatta in an Australian eight.

== Club and state rowing ==
Raised in Canberra, Moore's senior club rowing was from the Sydney Rowing Club.

Moore rowed for the Australian Capital Territory in their 2015 men's eight competing for the King's Cup at the Interstate Regatta. He first made state selection for New South Wales in their King's Cup eight at the 2017 Interstate Regatta. Moore rowed in three consecutive King's Cup victories for New South Wales from 2017 to 2019.

== International representative rowing ==
Moore made his Australian representative debut at the age of sixteen, in 2009, at the Junior World Rowing Championships in Brive-La Gaillarde where he won a silver medal in a junior coxed four. The following year at the 2010 Junior World Rowing Championships in Racice he won the bronze medal in a junior coxed four.

In 2011 Moore competed at the World Rowing U23 Championships in Amsterdam in the Australian U23 eight which raced to a seventh place finish. He then rowed in the eight at the U23 World Championships in Trakai 2012 where that crew won a bronze medal. In 2013 Moore was elevated to the Australian senior squad whilst being still eligible to race at the U23 World Championships. He rowed in a coxless four at the World Rowing Cup I in Sydney, then in a coxless pair with Alexander Hill at the World Rowing Cup III in Lucerne. He and Hill took that pair to the World Championships in Linz where they won an U23 World Championship silver medal. A month later at the 2013 World Rowing Championships in Chungju, Moore rowed in the three seat of an Australian men's eight that placed seventh. In 2014 he kept his seat in the Australian men's eight racing at two World Rowing Cups and the 2014 World Rowing Championships again to seventh place.

At the 2016 World University Championships in Poznan, Moore raced as Australia's coxless pair with Nathan Bowden. They won a bronze medal. Moore was back in the Australian squad for their 2017 international tour, once again in the men's eight. The boat placed fourth at the World Rowing Cup II in Poznan and won a silver medal at the World Rowing Cup III in Lucerne but finished the season ranked seventh in the world after placing second in the B Final of the 2017 World Rowing Championships in Sarasota, USA.

In 2018 Moore rowed in the eight to a fifth placing at the World Rowing Cup II in Linz, Austria. In the touring party's second regatta of the 2018 season he was in the bow seat of the Australian men's eight racing as the Georgina Hope Rinehart National Training Centre, in honour of Rowing Australia patron, Gina Rinehart which won the 2018 Grand Challenge Cup at the Henley Royal Regatta. This was only the fourth Australian men's eight to ever win that event. The following week at the World Rowing Cup III in Lucerne, Moore rowed in the Australian eight to a silver medal in a thrilling 0.14 second finish behind Germany. The stage was set for the close competition that played out at the 2018 World Championships in Plovdiv. In their heat the Australian eight finished 5/100ths of a second behind the USA and then in the final, Germany dominated and took gold. Just 2/10ths of a second separated 2nd through to 4th and the Australians took silver, a bowball ahead of Great Britain with the US out of the medals. Moore rowed at three, and came home with a silver world championship medal.

In 2019 Moore was again selected in the Australian men's eight for the international representative season. The eight placed 5th at the World Rowing Cup II in Poznan and 6th at WRC III in Rotterdam. Moore was selected to the crew for the 2019 World Rowing Championships in Linz, Austria. The eight were looking for a top five finish at the 2019 World Championships to qualify for the Tokyo Olympics. The eight placed second in their heat and fourth in the final thus qualifying the boat for Tokyo 2020.

Moore retired from competitive rowing in August 2020.
