= He Jing (TV presenter) =

Chinese television presenter (born 1969)

He Jing (Chinese: 和晶; pinyin: Hé Jīng; born 1969) is a Chinese television presenter.

He Jing was born in Maralbexi County, Xinjiang. She received her bachelor's degree from the Shanghai Theatre Academy in 1992. After graduation, she worked at Shanghai Television and hosted the program Broken Brain (智力大冲浪) from 1993 to 1997.

He Jing joined China Central Television in 2001 and hosted the talk show Tell It Like It Is from 2002 to 2009.
