= Luca Parlato =

Italian rower

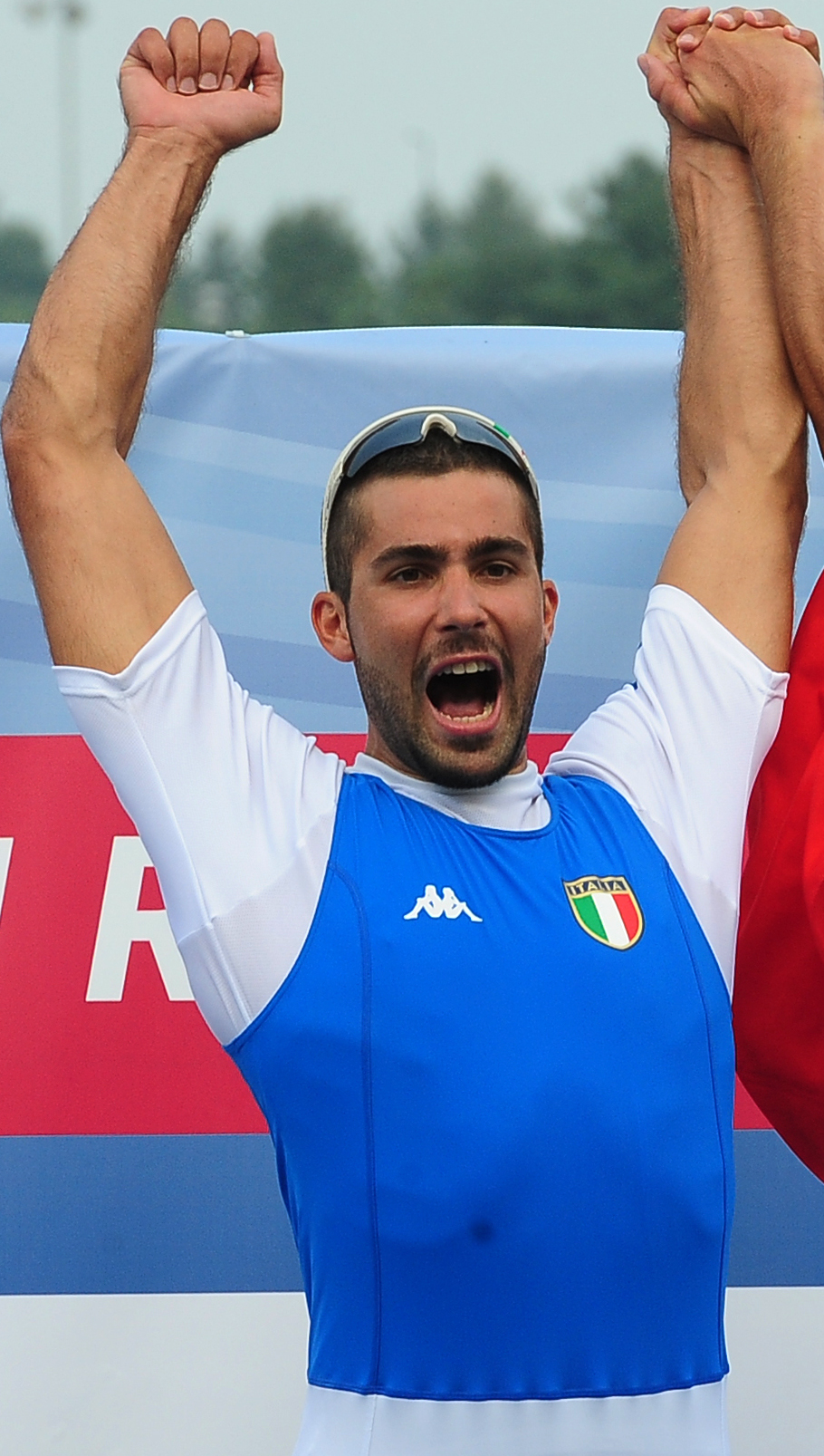
- Parlato on the 2013 World Rowing Championships podium.

Personal information
- Born: 25 June 1991 (age 35)

Sport
- Sport: Rowing
- Club: G.S. Marina Militare
Medal record
Men's rowing
Representing Italy
World Championships
Gold medal – first place	2013 Chungju	Coxed pair
Bronze medal – third place	2017 Sarasota	Eight

Luca Parlato (born 25 June 1991 in Vico Equense) is an Italian rower. He won the gold medal at the 2013 World Championships.

Parlato is an athlete of the Gruppo Sportivo della Marina Militare.
