= Wang Linqing =

Chinese Supreme People's Court judge

王林清
- Born: July 27, 1974 (age 51); China Shandong Yantai
- Political party: Chinese Communist Party (expelled)

Wang Linqing (Chinese: 王林清; pinyin: Wang Linqing; born July 27, 1974) is a Chinese former Supreme People's Court judge. He is known for participating in the trial of Zhao Faqi v. Shaanxi Government.

== Biography ==
Wang received his bachelor's degree in law from Yantai University, his master's degree in law from Peking University, and his doctorate degree from China University of Political Science and Law. He has done postdoctoral work in finance and economics at the Chinese Academy of Social Sciences and Renmin University of China.

== Missing case files and televised confession ==
In late 2018, former China Central Television (CCTV) journalist Cui Yongyuan posted on Sina Weibo that the files of Zhao Faqi v. Shaanxi Government, a case involving hundreds of billions of yuan in financial interests, had strangely disappeared inside China's Supreme People's Court. The Court responded that this was a rumor. Later, Cui made another post describing the incident and released several pictures as "evidence". The Court changed its tone and said it "has already started the investigation procedure".

On December 30, 2018, Huaxia Shibao, a Chinese media outlet, released a video in which Wang Linqing, a Supreme People's Court judge, confirmed the theft of the case files. Wang said that the video was recorded to "protect himself". It later turned out that the whistleblowing materials Cui Yongyuan released were also provided by Wang Linqing.

On January 8, 2019, the Central Political and Legal Affairs Commission (CPLAC) of the Chinese Communist Party (CCP) issued a press release on its official website stating that a joint investigation team was formed to investigate the matter. The team was led by the CPLAC, with the involvement of the CCP Central Commission for Discipline Inspection, the National Supervisory Commission, the Supreme People's Procuratorate, and the Ministry of Public Security of China.

In February 2019, the investigation team concluded that the loss of the case files was "self-directed" and "deliberately done" by Judge Wang Linqing, who was previously in charge of the case. The team said that Wang's behavior was suspected to be a crime, and that he was under criminal investigation. Shortly thereafter, Wang Linqing appeared on CCTV and "confessed" that he was the one stealing the case files to "vent anger and prevent others from handling the case". Zhao Faqi, the entrepreneur suing the government of Shaanxi in the case, has not been seen in public since then.

In October 2020, attorney Zhang Lei met with Wang Linqing inside a detention facility in Beijing. Radio Free Asia reported that according to Zhang, Wang Linqing was in "extremely poor health" and was subjected to "inhumane treatment" while in custody, but he has insisted that he is innocent.

=== Reaction ===
Some Chinese lawyers said that the official findings defied logic. Liu Xiaoyuan, a human rights lawyer, said, "From the viewpoint of common sense, many things about this are just hard to swallow," adding, "But it's also shocking to think that a high-level investigation like this would just make all this up."

== Prison sentence ==
In May 2022, Wang was sentenced to 14 years behind bars.

== See also ==
- Cui Yongyuan
- Forced confessions by CCTV/CGTN
