= Alexander Karwoski =

American rower

Personal information
- Born: September 16, 1990 (age 35)

Sport
- Sport: Rowing
Medal record
Men's rowing
Representing United States
World Championships
Silver medal – second place	2017 Sarasota	Eight

Alexander Karwoski (born September 16, 1990) is an American rower. He competed in the men's eight event at the 2016 Summer Olympics.
