= James Rook (rowing) =

Australian rowing cox

Personal information
- Born: 18 November 1997 (age 28) Malvern, Victoria, Australia
- Education: Scotch College Melbourne
- Height: 169 cm (5 ft 7 in)

Sport
- Country: Australia
- Sport: Rowing
- Event(s): Coxed pair, Eight
- Club: Mercantile Rowing Club; Melbourne University Boat Club
- Coached by: Tom Westgarth

Achievements and titles
- Olympic finals: Tokyo 2020 W8+
- National finals: King's Cup 2017-19, 2022; Queen's Cup 2021
Medal record
Men's rowing
Representing Australia
World Championships
Silver medal – second place	2017 Sarasota	Coxed pair
Silver medal – second place	2019 Ottensheim	Eight
Bronze medal – third place	2018 Plovdiv	Eight

James Rook (born 18 November 1997) is an Australian national representative rowing coxswain. He is an Olympian and a medallist at the 2017, 2018 and 2019 World Rowing Championships and a winner of the Remenham Challenge Cup at the 2018 Henley Royal Regatta. He is notable for becoming in 2018 the first Australian male coxswain to steer a representative Australian female crew under the FISA gender-neutral coxswain selection policy change of 2017. He coxed the Australian women's eight at the Tokyo 2020 Olympics.

== Club and state rowing ==
Rook was educated at Scotch College, Melbourne where he took up rowing. His senior coxing was from Mercantile Rowing Club.

He was first selected to represent Victoria in the men's youth eight who contested the Noel F Wilkinson Trophy in the Interstate Regatta within the 2016 Australian Rowing Championships. In 2017, 2018, 2019 and 2022 he coxed the Victorian senior men's eight contesting the King's Cup at the Australian Interstate Regatta. In 2021 he coxed (and co-coached) the Victorian women's eight to a Queen's Cup victory at the Australian Interstate Regatta.

In 2021 in the stern of a National Training Centre eight, he won the open women's eight title at the Australian Championships.

== International representative rowing ==
Rook was first selected to represent Australia in the senior men's squad of 2017 who raced at the World Rowing Cups II and III in Europe before contesting the 2017 World Rowing Championships in Sarasota USA. At those World Championships, Rook coxed the Australian coxed pair of Angus Widdicombe and Darcy Wruck to a silver medal. He also steered the Australian men's senior eight in Sarasota to an overall eighth placing.

In 2017 FISA announced a number of new rule changes, including voting for coxswains to become gender neutral. In 2018 Australian selection processes embraced this new policy resulting in Rook being selected to steer the Australian women's senior eight for the World Rowing Cup II of 2018 and Kendall Brodie of Sydney Rowing Club being selected to cox the Australian men's senior eight. The women's eight with Rook in the stern started their 2018 international campaign with a bronze medal win at the World Rowing Cup II in Linz, Austria. In their second competitive outing of the 2018 international season in a national selection eight and racing as the Georgina Hope Rinehart National Training Centre, after Rowing Australia patron, Gina Rinehart, Rook steered the 2018 Australian women's eight to a Remenham Challenge Cup victory at the Henley Royal Regatta. At the 2018 World Rowing Championships in Plovdiv the Australian women's eight with Rook at cox, won their heat and placed third in the final winning the bronze medal.

In 2019 Rook was again picked in Australian senior sweep squad for the international season. He coxed the Australian women's eight to their gold medal win at Rowing World Cup II in Poznan and to a silver medal at WRC III in Rotterdam. Rook was then selected to cox Australia's women's eight at the 2019 World Rowing Championships in Linz, Austria. The eight were looking for a top five finish at the 2019 World Championships to qualify for the Tokyo Olympics. They placed second in their heat, came through the repechage and led in the final from the start and at all three 500m marks till they were overrun by New Zealand by 2.7secs. The Australian eight took the silver medal and qualified for Tokyo 2020.

At the Tokyo 2020 Olympics the Australian women's eight were placed third in their heat, fourth in the repechage and fifth in the Olympic A final. Had they managed to maintain their time of 5:57:15 that they achieved in their repechage they would have beaten the winners, Canada, by nearly two seconds and won the gold medal.
