= September 2011 in sports =

<<	September 2011					>>
Su	Mo	Tu	We	Th	Fr	Sa
				1	2	3
4	5	6	7	8	9	10
11	12	13	14	15	16	17
18	19	20	21	22	23	24
25	26	27	28	29	30
Sports

This list shows notable sports-related deaths, events, and notable outcomes that occurred in September of 2011.

== Deaths in September ==
- 12: Alexander Galimov
- 11: Christian Bakkerud
- 7: 36 players and staff of Lokomotiv Yaroslavl
- 5: Lee Roy Selmon

== Sporting seasons ==
=== American football 2011 ===
- National Football League
- NCAA Division I FBS
- NCAA Division I FCS

=== Australian rules football 2011 ===
- Australian Football League
  - Finals Series

=== Auto racing 2011 ===
- Formula One
- Sprint Cup
- Nationwide Series
- Camping World Truck Series
- IRL IndyCar Series
- World Rally Championship
- WTTC
- V8 Supercar
- Formula Two
- GP2 Series
- GP3 Series
- American Le Mans
- Le Mans Series
- Rolex Sports Car Series
- FIA GT1 World Championship
- Auto GP
- World Series by Renault
- Deutsche Tourenwagen Masters
- Super GT

=== Baseball 2011 ===
- Major League Baseball
- Nippon Professional Baseball

=== Basketball 2011 ===
- WNBA
- Philippines collegiate:
  - NCAA
  - UAAP

=== Canadian football 2011 ===
- Canadian Football League
- CIS football

=== Cricket 2011 ===
- England:
  - County Championship
  - Clydesdale Bank 40

=== Football (soccer) 2011 ===
National teams competitions

- 2014 FIFA World Cup qualification
- UEFA Euro 2012 qualifying
- 2012 Africa Cup of Nations qualification
- UEFA Women's Euro 2013 qualifying

International clubs competitions

- UEFA (Europe) Champions League
- UEFA Europa League
- UEFA Women's Champions League
- Copa Sudamericana
- AFC (Asia) Champions League
- AFC Cup
- CAF (Africa) Champions League
- CAF Confederation Cup
- CONCACAF (North & Central America) Champions League

Domestic (national) competitions

- Argentina
- Brazil
- England
- France
- Germany
- Italy
- Japan
- Norway
- Portugal
- Russia
- Scotland
- Spain
- Major League Soccer (USA & Canada)

=== Golf 2011 ===
- PGA Tour
- European Tour
- LPGA Tour
- Champions Tour

=== Motorcycle racing 2011 ===
- Moto GP
- Superbike World Championship
- Supersport World Championship

=== Rugby league 2011 ===
- Super League
- NRL

=== Rugby union 2011 ===
- Aviva Premiership
- RaboDirect Pro12
- Top 14
- Currie Cup
- ITM Cup

=== Tennis 2011 ===
- ATP World Tour
- WTA Tour

=== Winter sports ===
- ISU Junior Grand Prix
- Snowboard World Cup

== Days of the month ==
=== September 30, 2011 (Friday) ===
==== Baseball ====
- Major League Baseball postseason:
  - American League Division Series:
    - Game 1 in Arlington, Texas: Tampa Bay Rays 9, Texas Rangers 0. Rays lead series 1–0.
    - Game 1 in New York: New York Yankees 1, Detroit Tigers 1 — game suspended in the bottom of the second inning due to rain; game will be resumed on October 1.

==== Basketball ====
- FIBA Africa Championship for Women in Bamako, Mali:
  - Quarterfinals:
    - Cameroon 50–73 **Mali**
    - DR Congo 54–85 **Senegal**
    - **Nigeria** 77–49 Mozambique
    - Ivory Coast 51–72 **Angola**
- FIBA Americas Championship for Women in Neiva, Colombia (teams in italics qualify for World Olympic Qualifying Tournament:
  - Semifinals:
    - **Argentina** 61–59 Canada
    - **Brazil** 66–53 Cuba

==== Figure skating ====
- ISU Junior Grand Prix:
  - JGP Cup of Austria in Innsbruck, Austria:
    - Pairs: (gold) Sui Wenjing/Han Cong (CHN) 167.14 points (silver) Yu Xiaoyu/Jin Yang (CHN) 154.37 (bronze) Ekaterina Petaikina/Maxim Kurdyukov (RUS) 144.47
      - Standings (after 3 of 4 events): Sui/Han 30 points (2 events), Yu/Jin 26 (2), Petaikina/Kurdyukov 20 (2), Tatiana Tudvaseva/Sergei Lisiev (RUS) 18 (2), Britney Simpson/Matthew Blackmer (USA) 15.
    - Ladies: (gold) Vanessa Lam (USA) 156.58 points (silver) Li Zijun (CHN) 156.40 (bronze) Polina Agafonova (RUS) 148.65
      - Standings (after 5 of 7 events): Polina Shelepen (RUS) 30 points (2 events), Lam & Li 26 (2), Polina Korobeynikova (RUS) & Agafonova 22 (2).

==== Rugby league ====
- Super League Play-offs:
  - Semi-Finals: Warrington Wolves 24–26 **Leeds Rhinos**

==== Rugby union ====
- World Cup in New Zealand (team in **bold** qualifies for quarter-finals, team in italics qualifies for 2015 World Cup):
  - Pool D in Auckland: **South Africa** 13–5 Samoa
    - Standings (after 4 matches unless stated): South Africa 18 points, Wales 10 (3), Samoa 10, Fiji 5 (3), Namibia 0.

==== Volleyball ====
- Women's South American Championship in Callao, Peru (teams in **bold** advance to semifinals):
  - Pool A: Uruguay 0–3 **Colombia**
    - Final standings: **Peru** 6 points, Colombia 3, Uruguay 0.
  - Pool B:
    - Chile 3–0 Paraguay
    - **Brazil** 3–0 **Argentina**
      - Final standings: Brazil 9 points, Argentina 6, Chile 3, Paraguay 0.

=== September 29, 2011 (Thursday) ===
==== Cricket ====
- ICC Intercontinental Cup One-Day:
  - 6th Match in Windhoek: Namibia 266/8 (50 overs; Craig Williams 116); Scotland 247/7 (44.5/45 overs). **Scotland win by 3 wickets (D/L).**
    - Standings (after 4 matches unless stated): Ireland, Scotland 8 points, Afghanistan 4 (2), Netherlands 4, Kenya 2, United Arab Emirates 2 (2), Namibia, Canada 0.

==== Football (soccer) ====
- UEFA Europa League group stage Matchday 2:
  - Group A:
    - Rubin Kazan (Russia) 2–2 (Greece) PAOK
    - Tottenham Hotspur (England) 3–1 (Republic of Ireland) Shamrock Rovers
      - Standings (after 2 matches): Rubin Kazan, Tottenham Hotspur 4 points, PAOK 2, Shamrock Rovers 0.
  - Group B:
    - Vorskla Poltava (Ukraine) 1–2 (Germany) Hannover
    - Standard Liège (Belgium) 3–0 (Denmark) Copenhagen
      - Standings (after 2 matches): Standard Liège, Hannover 4 points, Copenhagen 3, Vorskla Poltava 0.
  - Group C:
    - Legia Warsaw (Poland) 3–2 (Israel) Hapoel Tel Aviv
    - Rapid București (Romania) 1–3 (Netherlands) PSV Eindhoven
      - Standings (after 2 matches): PSV Eindhoven 6 points, Legia Warsaw, Rapid București 3, Hapoel Tel Aviv 0.
  - Group D:
    - Vaslui (Romania) 2–2 (Switzerland) Zürich
    - Sporting CP (Portugal) 2–1 (Italy) Lazio
      - Standings (after 2 matches): Sporting CP 6 points, Vaslui 2, Lazio, Zürich 1.
  - Group E:
    - Maccabi Tel Aviv (Israel) 1–1 (Ukraine) Dynamo Kyiv
    - Stoke City (England) 2–1 (Turkey) Beşiktaş
      - Standings (after 2 matches): Stoke City 4 points, Beşiktaş 3, Dynamo Kyiv 2, Maccabi Tel Aviv 1.
  - Group F:
    - Red Bull Salzburg (Austria) 3–0 (Slovakia) Slovan Bratislava
    - Athletic Bilbao (Spain) 2–0 (France) Paris Saint-Germain
      - Standings (after 2 matches): Athletic Bilbao 6 points, Paris Saint-Germain, Red Bull Salzburg 3, Slovan Bratislava 0.
  - Group G:
    - Metalist Kharkiv (Ukraine) 1–1 (Netherlands) AZ
    - Malmö FF (Sweden) 1–2 Austria Wien
      - Standings (after 2 matches): AZ, Metalist Kharkiv 4 points, Austria Wien 3, Malmö FF 0.
  - Group H:
    - Braga (Portugal) 1–2 (Belgium) Club Brugge
    - Maribor (Slovenia) 1–2 (England) Birmingham City
      - Standings (after 2 matches): Club Brugge 6 points, Braga, Birmingham City 3, Maribor 0.
  - Group I:
    - Celtic (Scotland) 1–1 (Italy) Udinese
    - Rennes (France) 1–1 (Spain) Atlético Madrid
      - Standings (after 2 matches): Atlético Madrid, Udinese 4 points, Rennes, Celtic 1.
  - Group J:
    - Schalke 04 (Germany) 3–1 (Israel) Maccabi Haifa
    - AEK Larnaca (Cyprus) 1–1 (Romania) Steaua București
      - Standings (after 2 matches): Schalke 04 4 points, Maccabi Haifa 3, Steaua București 2, AEK Larnaca 1.
  - Group K:
    - Twente (Netherlands) 4–1 (Poland) Wisła Kraków
    - Odense (Denmark) 0–2 (England) Fulham
      - Standings (after 2 matches): Twente, Fulham 4 points, Odense 3, Wisła Kraków 0.
  - Group L:
    - Lokomotiv Moscow (Russia) 0–2 (Belgium) Anderlecht
    - AEK Athens (Greece) 1–2 (Austria) Sturm Graz
      - Standings (after 2 matches): Anderlecht 6 points, Lokomotiv Moscow, Sturm Graz 3, AEK Athens 0.
- UEFA Women's Champions League Round of 32 first leg:
  - Tavagnacco (Italy) 2–1 (Sweden) LdB Malmö
  - Glasgow City (Scotland) 1–1 (Iceland) Valur
  - Bristol Academy (England) 1–1 (Russia) Energiya Voronezh
  - Bobruichanka (Belarus) 0–4 (England) Arsenal
- CONCACAF Champions League group stage Matchday 5:
  - Group A: Alajuelense (Costa Rica) 1–0 (Honduras) Motagua
    - Standings (after 5 matches): Alajuelense 12 points, (Mexico) Morelia, (United States) Los Angeles Galaxy 9, Motagua 0.
- Copa Sudamericana Round of 16 first leg:
  - Olimpia (Paraguay) 0–0 (Argentina) Arsenal
  - Godoy Cruz (Argentina) 1–1 (Peru) Universitario
  - Botafogo (Brazil) 1–1 (Colombia) Santa Fe

==== Volleyball ====
- Women's European Championship in Italy and Serbia:
  - Quarterfinals in Belgrade, Serbia:
    - **Germany** 3–0 Czech Republic
    - Poland 0–3 **Serbia**
- Men's Asian Championship in Tehran, Iran:
  - Bronze medal match: (bronze) **South Korea** 3–1 Australia
  - Final: (gold) **Iran** 3–1 (silver) China
    - Iran win the title for the first time.
    - Iran and China qualify for the FIVB World Cup.
- Men's African Championship in Tangier, Morocco:
  - Bronze medal match: Algeria 1–3 (bronze) **Tunisia**
  - Final: (silver) Cameroon 1–3 (gold) **Egypt**
    - Egypt win the title for the fourth successive time, and sixth time overall.
    - Egypt qualify for the FIVB World Cup.
- Women's South American Championship in Callao, Peru (teams in **bold** advance to semifinals):
  - Pool A: **Peru** 3–0 Uruguay
    - Standings: Peru 6 points (2 matches), Colombia, Uruguay 0 (1).
  - Pool B:
    - **Argentina** 3–0 Paraguay
    - **Brazil** 3–0 Chile
      - Standings (after 2 matches): Brazil, Argentina 6 points, Chile, Paraguay 0.

=== September 28, 2011 (Wednesday) ===
==== Baseball ====
- Major League Baseball news:
  - The Tampa Bay Rays clinch the American League wild card with an 8–7 win over the New York Yankees.
  - The St. Louis Cardinals clinch the National League wild card with an 8–0 win over the Houston Astros.

==== Basketball ====
- FIBA Africa Championship for Women in Bamako, Mali (teams in **bold** advance to the quarterfinals):
  - Group A:
    - **Mozambique** 106–37 Ghana
    - Tunisia 53–74 **Ivory Coast**
    - **DR Congo** 57–70 **Mali**
      - Final standings: Mali 10 points, Mozambique 9, Côte d'Ivoire, DR Congo, Tunisia 7, Ghana 4.
  - Group B:
    - Guinea 49–63 **Angola**
    - Rwanda 49–59 **Nigeria**
    - **Cameroon** 59–78 **Senegal**
      - Final standings: Senegal 10 points, Angola 9, Nigeria 8, Cameroon 7, Rwanda 6, Guinea 5.
- FIBA Americas Championship for Women in Neiva, Colombia (teams in **bold** advance to the semifinals):
  - Group A:
    - **Cuba** 62–42 Chile
    - Colombia 45–66 **Argentina**
      - Final standings: Argentina 8 points, Cuba 7, Puerto Rico 6, Colombia 5, Chile 4.
  - Group B:
    - Paraguay 44–87 Mexico
    - **Canada** 66–49 Jamaica
      - Final standings: **Brazil** 8 points, Canada 7, Mexico, Jamaica, Paraguay 5.

==== Cricket ====
- ICC Intercontinental Cup One-Day:
  - 5th Match in Windhoek: Namibia 257 (50 overs); Scotland 137/2 (26 overs). **Scotland win by 34 runs (D/L).**
    - Standings (after 4 matches unless stated): Ireland 8 points, Scotland 6 (3), Afghanistan 4 (2), Netherlands 4, Kenya 2, United Arab Emirates 2 (2), Namibia 0 (3), Canada 0.

==== Football (soccer) ====
- Superclásico de las Américas second leg in Belém (first leg score in parentheses): **Brazil** 2–0 (0–0) Argentina. Brazil win 4–1 on points.
- UEFA Champions League group stage Matchday 2:
  - Group E:
    - Valencia (Spain) 1–1 (England) Chelsea
    - Bayer Leverkusen (Germany) 2–0 (Belgium) Genk
      - Standings (after 2 matches): Chelsea 4 points, Bayer Leverkusen 3, Valencia 2, Genk 1.
  - Group F:
    - Arsenal (England) 2–1 (Greece) Olympiacos
    - Marseille (France) 3–0 (Germany) Borussia Dortmund
      - Standings (after 2 matches): Marseille 6 points, Arsenal 4, Borussia Dortmund 1, Olympiacos 0.
  - Group G:
    - Zenit St. Petersburg (Russia) 3–1 (Portugal) Porto
    - Shakhtar Donetsk (Ukraine) 1–1 (Cyprus) APOEL
      - Standings (after 2 matches): APOEL 4 points, Zenit St. Petersburg, Porto 3, Shakhtar Donetsk 1.
  - Group H:
    - BATE Borisov (Belarus) 0–5 (Spain) Barcelona
    - Milan (Italy) 2–0 (Czech Republic) Viktoria Plzeň
      - Standings (after 2 matches): Barcelona, Milan 4 points, Viktoria Plzeň, BATE Borisov 1.
- UEFA Women's Champions League Round of 32 first leg:
  - Olimpia Cluj (Romania) 0–9 (France) Lyon
  - Peamount United (Republic of Ireland) 0–2 (France) Paris Saint-Germain
  - CSHVSM (Kazakhstan) 2–1 (Austria) Neulengbach
  - Apollon Limassol (Cyprus) 2–2 (Czech Republic) Sparta Praha
  - PK-35 Vantaa (Finland) 1–4 (Spain) Rayo Vallecano
  - Osijek (Croatia) 0–4 (Sweden) Göteborg
  - YB Frauen (Switzerland) 0–3 (Denmark) Fortuna Hjørring
  - Þór/KA (Iceland) 0–6 (Germany) Turbine Potsdam
  - Twente (Netherlands) 0–2 (Russia) Rossiyanka
  - Stabæk (Norway) 1–0 (Germany) FFC Frankfurt
- Copa Sudamericana Round of 16 first leg: LDU Quito (Ecuador) 2–0 (Argentina) Independiente
- AFC Champions League Quarter-finals second leg (first leg scores in parentheses):
  - Zob Ahan (Iran) 1–2 (a.e.t.) (1–1) (South Korea) **Suwon Samsung Bluewings**. Suwon Samsung Bluewings win 3–2 on aggregate.
  - **Al-Sadd** (Qatar) 1–2 (3–0) (Iran) Sepahan. Al-Sadd win 4–2 on aggregate.
- AFC Cup quarter-finals second leg (first leg score in parentheses): Duhok (Iraq) 0–3 (1–5) (Jordan) **Al-Wehdat**. Al-Wehdat win 8–1 on aggregate.
- CONCACAF Champions League group stage Matchday 5 (team in **bold** advances to the quarterfinals):
  - Group A: Los Angeles Galaxy (United States) 2–1 (Mexico) Morelia
    - Standings: Morelia, Los Angeles Galaxy 9 points (5 matches), (Costa Rica) Alajuelense 9 (4), (Honduras) Motagua 0 (4).
  - Group B:
    - Real España (Honduras) 1–1 (Mexico) **Santos Laguna**
    - Isidro Metapán (El Salvador) 1–3 (United States) Colorado Rapids
      - Standings (after 5 matches): Santos Laguna 10 points, Colorado Rapids 7, Isidro Metapán 6, Real España 5.
  - Group C: Tauro (Panama) 5–3 (United States) FC Dallas
    - Standings (after 5 matches): (Mexico) UNAM 8 points, FC Dallas, (Canada) Toronto FC 7, Tauro 5.

==== Rugby union ====
- World Cup in New Zealand (teams in italics qualify for 2015 World Cup):
  - Pool B in Palmerston North: Georgia 25–9 Romania
    - Standings (after 3 matches unless stated): England 14 points, Argentina, Scotland 10, Georgia 4, Romania 0 (4).

==== Volleyball ====
- Women's European Championship in Italy and Serbia:
  - Qualification playoff in Belgrade, Serbia:
    - **Czech Republic** 3–1 France
    - **Serbia** 3–0 Romania
  - Quarterfinals in Monza, Italy:
    - Russia 0–3 **Turkey**
    - **Italy** 3–1 Netherlands
- Men's Asian Championship in Tehran, Iran:
  - Semifinals:
    - Australia 2–3 **China**
    - **Iran** 3–1 South Korea
- Women's South American Championship in Callao, Peru:
  - Pool A: Colombia 1–3 Peru
  - Pool B:
    - Brazil 3–0 Paraguay
    - Chile 0–3 Argentina

=== September 27, 2011 (Tuesday) ===
==== Basketball ====
- FIBA Africa Championship for Women in Bamako, Mali (teams in **bold** advance to the quarterfinals):
  - Group A:
    - Ivory Coast 101–23 Ghana
    - **Mali** 73–43 **Mozambique**
    - Tunisia 55–48 DR Congo
      - Standings (after 4 games): Mali 8 points, Mozambique 7, Tunisia, DR Congo 6, Côte d'Ivoire 5, Ghana 3.
  - Group B:
    - Guinea 28–76 Cameroon
    - **Senegal** 71–61 Rwanda
    - **Angola** 67–60 Nigeria
      - Standings (after 4 games): Senegal 8 points, Angola 7, Nigeria, Cameroon 6, Rwanda 5, Guinea 4.
- FIBA Americas Championship for Women in Neiva, Colombia (teams in **bold** advance to the semifinals):
  - Group A:
    - Chile 49–64 Puerto Rico
    - **Argentina** 65–59 **Cuba**
      - Standings (after 3 games unless stated): Argentina 6 points, Puerto Rico 6 (4), Cuba 5, Colombia 4, Chile 3.
  - Group B:
    - Jamaica 69–71 Paraguay
    - Mexico 61–88 **Brazil**
      - Standings (after 3 games unless stated): Brazil 8 points (4 games), Canada 5, Paraguay, Jamaica 4, Mexico 3.

==== Football (soccer) ====
- UEFA Champions League group stage Matchday 2:
  - Group A:
    - Bayern Munich (Germany) 2–0 (England) Manchester City
    - Napoli (Italy) 2–0 (Spain) Villarreal
      - Standings (after 2 matches): Bayern Munich 6 points, Napoli 4, Manchester City 1, Villarreal 0.
  - Group B:
    - CSKA Moscow (Russia) 2–3 (Italy) Internazionale
    - Trabzonspor (Turkey) 1–1 (France) Lille
      - Standings (after 2 matches): Trabzonspor 4 points, Internazionale 3, Lille 2, CSKA Moscow 1.
  - Group C:
    - Manchester United (England) 3–3 (Switzerland) Basel
    - Oțelul Galați (Romania) 0–1 (Portugal) Benfica
      - Standings (after 2 matches): Basel, Benfica 4 points, Manchester United 2, Oțelul Galați 0.
  - Group D:
    - Lyon (France) 2–0 (Croatia) Dinamo Zagreb
    - Real Madrid (Spain) 3–0 (Netherlands) Ajax
      - Standings (after 2 matches): Real Madrid 6 points, Lyon 4, Ajax 1, Dinamo Zagreb 0.
- UEFA Women's Champions League Round of 32 first leg:
  - Standard Liège (Belgium) 0–2 (Denmark) Brøndby IF
  - ASA Tel Aviv University (Israel) 0–2 (Italy) Torres
- AFC Champions League Quarter-finals second leg (first leg scores in parentheses):
  - **Jeonbuk Hyundai Motors** (South Korea) 6–1 (3–4) (Japan) Cerezo Osaka. Jeonbuk Hyundai Motors win 9–5 on aggregate.
  - FC Seoul (South Korea) 1–0 (1–3) (Saudi Arabia) **Al-Ittihad**. Al-Ittihad win 3–2 on aggregate.
- AFC Cup quarter-finals second leg (first leg scores in parentheses):
  - Muangthong United (Thailand) 0–0 (0–1) **Al-Kuwait**. Al-Kuwait win 1–0 on aggregate.
  - **Nasaf Qarshi** (Uzbekistan) 0–1 (1–0) (Thailand) Chonburi. 1–1 on aggregate; Nasaf Qarshi win 4–3 on penalties.
  - **Arbil** (Iraq) 1–0 (2–1) (Indonesia) Persipura Jayapura. Arbil win 3–1 on aggregate.
- CONCACAF Champions League group stage Matchday 5 (teams in **bold** advance to the quarterfinals):
  - Group C: Toronto FC (Canada) 1–1 (Mexico) UNAM
    - Standings: UNAM 8 points (5 matches), (United States) FC Dallas 7 (4), Toronto FC 7 (5), (Panama) Tauro 2 (4).
  - Group D:
    - Comunicaciones (Guatemala) 2–2 (United States) **Seattle Sounders FC**
    - Monterrey (Mexico) 1–0 (Costa Rica) Herediano
      - Standings (after 5 matches): Seattle Sounders 10 points, Monterrey 9, Comunicaciones 7, Herediano 3.

==== Rugby union ====
- World Cup in New Zealand (team in **bold** advances to the quarterfinals, teams in italics qualify for 2015 World Cup):
  - Pool A in Napier: Canada 23–23 Japan
    - Standings (after 3 matches unless stated): **New Zealand** 15 points, France 10, Canada 6, Tonga 5, Japan 2 (4).
  - Pool C in Nelson: Italy 27–10 United States
    - Standings (after 3 matches unless stated): Ireland 13 points, Australia, Italy 10, United States 4 (4), Russia 1.

==== Volleyball ====
- Women's European Championship in Italy and Serbia:
  - Qualification playoff in Monza, Italy:
    - **Turkey** 3–0 Spain
    - **Netherlands** 3–1 Azerbaijan
- Men's African Championship in Tangier, Morocco:
  - Semifinals:
    - **Cameroon** 3–2 Algeria
    - **Egypt** 3–0 Tunisia
- Men's Asian Championship in Tehran, Iran:
  - Quarterfinals:
    - **Australia** 3–1 Pakistan
    - India 0–3 **China**
    - **South Korea** 3–2 Japan
    - **Iran** 3–0 Sri Lanka

=== September 26, 2011 (Monday) ===
==== Basketball ====
- FIBA Africa Championship for Women in Bamako, Mali (teams in **bold** advance to the quarterfinals):
  - Group A: Ghana 37–89 DR Congo
    - Standings (after 3 games): **Mali**, **Mozambique** 6 points, DR Congo 5, Tunisia 4, Ivory Coast 3, Ghana 2.
  - Group B: Angola 66–45 Cameroon
    - Standings (after 3 games): Senegal 6 points, Nigeria, Angola 5, Rwanda, Cameroon 4, Guinea 3.
- FIBA Americas Championship for Women in Neiva, Colombia (teams in **bold** advance to the semifinals):
  - Group A:
    - Puerto Rico 61–66 Argentina
    - Cuba 75–65 Colombia
      - Standings (after 2 games unless stated): Argentina, Cuba 4 points, Puerto Rico, Colombia 4 (3), Chile 2.
  - Group B:
    - Paraguay 26–77 Canada
    - **Brazil** 73–50 Jamaica
      - Standings (after 2 games unless stated): Brazil 6 points (3 games), Canada 5 (3), Jamaica 3, Mexico, Paraguay 2.

==== Cricket ====
- ICC Intercontinental Cup in Windhoek, day 4: Scotland 350 & 296/5d (87 overs); Namibia 263 & 218/4 (74 overs). **Match drawn.**
  - Standings (after 2 matches unless stated): Ireland 40 points, Afghanistan 20 (1), Scotland 20, Netherlands 17, Kenya 16, United Arab Emirates 14 (1), Namibia 7, Canada 0.

==== Rugby union ====
- World Cup in New Zealand (team in **bold** qualifies for 2015 World Cup):
  - Pool D in New Plymouth: Wales 81–7 Namibia
    - Standings (after 3 matches unless stated): **South Africa** 14 points, Wales, Samoa 10, Fiji 5, Namibia 0 (4).

==== Volleyball ====
- Women's European Championship in Italy and Serbia (teams in **bold** advance to the quarterfinals, teams in italics advance to the playoffs):
  - Pool A in Belgrade, Serbia:
    - Ukraine 0–3 France
    - Serbia 1–3 **Germany**
      - Final standings: Germany 9 points, Serbia 6, France 3, Ukraine 0.
  - Pool C in Zrenjanin, Serbia:
    - Czech Republic 3–0 Israel
    - **Poland** 3–0 Romania
      - Final standings: Poland 9 points, Czech Republic 6, Romania 3, Israel 0.
- Men's Asian Championship in Tehran, Iran:
  - Pool E:
    - India 3–2 Pakistan
    - Iran 3–0 Japan
      - Final standings: Iran 9 points, India 5, Japan, Pakistan 2.
  - Pool F:
    - Sri Lanka 0–3 South Korea
    - China 1–3 Australia
      - Final standings: Australia 8 points, South Korea 6, China 4, Sri Lanka 0.

=== September 25, 2011 (Sunday) ===
==== Athletics ====
- World Marathon Majors:
  - Berlin Marathon (KEN unless stated):
    - Men: (gold) Patrick Makau Musyoki 2:03:38 (WR) (silver) Stephen Chemlany 2:07:55 (bronze) Emannuel Kimaiyo 2:09:50
      - Makau breaks the previous world record by 21 seconds.
    - Women: (gold) Florence Kiplagat 2:19:44 (silver) Irina Mikitenko (GER) 2:22:18 (bronze) Paula Radcliffe (GBR) 2:23:46

==== Auto racing ====
- Formula One:
  - Singapore Grand Prix in Marina Bay, Singapore: (1) Sebastian Vettel (GER) (Red Bull-Renault) (2) Jenson Button (GBR) (McLaren-Mercedes) (3) Mark Webber (AUS) (Red Bull-Renault)
    - Drivers' championship standings (after 14 of 19 races): (1) Vettel 309 points (2) Button 185 (3) Fernando Alonso (ESP) (Ferrari) 184
- Sprint Cup Series – Chase for the Sprint Cup:
  - Sylvania 300 in Loudon, New Hampshire: (1) (Indiana) Tony Stewart (Chevrolet; Stewart Haas Racing) (2) (Michigan) Brad Keselowski (Dodge; Penske Racing) (3) (Washington (state)) Greg Biffle (Ford; Roush Fenway Racing)
    - Drivers' championship standings (after 28 of 36 races): (1) Stewart 2094 points (2) (California) Kevin Harvick (Chevrolet; Richard Childress Racing) 2087 (3) Keselowski 2083

==== Badminton ====
- BWF Super Series:
  - Japan Super Series in Tokyo (CHN unless stated):
    - Men's singles: **Chen Long** def. Lee Chong Wei (MAS) 21–8, 10–21, 21–19
    - Women's singles: **Wang Yihan** def. Juliane Schenk (GER) 21–16, 21–14
    - Men's doubles: **Cai Yun**/**Fu Haifeng** def. Mohammad Ahsan (INA)/Bona Septano (INA) 21–13, 23–21
    - Women's doubles: **Bao Yixin**/**Zhong Qianxin** def. Cheng Wen-hsing (TPE)/Chien Yu-chin (TPE) 13–21, 25–23, 21–12
    - Mixed doubles: **Chen Hung-ling** (TPE)/**Cheng Wen-hsing** (TPE) def. Joachim Fischer Nielsen (DEN)/Christinna Pedersen (DEN) 21–19, 16–21, 21–15

==== Basketball ====
- FIBA Asia Championship in Wuhan, China:
  - Bronze medal game: Philippines 68–70 **South Korea**
  - Final: (gold) **China** 70–69 (silver) Jordan
    - China win the title for the 15th time, and qualify for the 2012 Olympics.
    - Jordan and Korea both qualify for World Olympic Qualifying Tournament.
- FIBA Africa Championship for Women in Bamako, Mali:
  - Group A:
    - Mozambique 69–53 Tunisia
    - Mali 95–30 Ghana
    - Ivory Coast 54–59 DR Congo
      - Standings (after 3 games unless stated): Mali, Mozambique 6 points, Tunisia 4, DR Congo 3 (2), Côte d'Ivoire 3, Ghana 1 (2).
  - Group B:
    - Nigeria 68–60 Cameroon
    - Senegal 99–32 Guinea
    - Angola 67–59 Rwanda
      - Standings (after 3 games unless stated): Senegal 6 points, Nigeria 5, Rwanda 4, Cameroon, Angola 3 (2), Guinea 3.
- FIBA Americas Championship for Women in Neiva, Colombia:
  - Group A:
    - Argentina 80–50 Chile
    - Colombia 46–68 Puerto Rico
      - Standings (after 2 games unless stated): Puerto Rico, Colombia 3 points, Argentina, Cuba 2 (1), Chile 2.
  - Group B:
    - Jamaica 69–64 Mexico
    - Canada 39–56 Brazil
      - Standings (after 2 games unless stated): Brazil 4 points, Canada 3, Jamaica 2 (1), Mexico 2, Paraguay 1 (1).

==== Cricket ====
- West Indies in England:
  - 2nd T20I in London: West Indies 113/5 (20 overs); England 88 (16.4 overs). **West Indies win by 25 runs; 2-match series drawn 1–1.**
- ICC Intercontinental Cup in Windhoek, day 3: Scotland 350 & 260/4 (81 overs; Preston Mommsen 102); Namibia 263 (86.1 overs; Majid Haq 6/32). Scotland lead by 347 runs with 6 wickets remaining.

==== Cycling ====
- Road World Championships in Copenhagen, Denmark:
  - Road race Elite Men: (gold) Mark Cavendish (GBR) 5:40:27 (silver) Matthew Goss (AUS) s.t. (bronze) André Greipel (GER) s.t.
    - Cavendish becomes the first British man to win the world road race title since Tom Simpson in 1965.

==== Equestrianism ====
- Show jumping – Nations Cup Promotional League:
  - Final in Barcelona (CSIO 5*): (gold) Sweden (Malin Baryard-Johnsson, Angelica Augustsson, Svante Johansson, Rolf-Göran Bengtsson) (silver) Spain (Rutherford Latham, Antonio Marinas Soto, Julio Arias Cueva, Sergio Alvarez Moya) (bronze) Ukraine (Cassio Rivetti, Oleksandr Onishchenko, Björn Nagel, Katharina Offel)
    - Sweden are promoted to the 2012 FEI Nations Cup.

==== Golf ====
- Solheim Cup in Dunshaughlin, County Meath, Ireland, day 3: Europe 15–13 United States
  - Singles:
    - Catriona Matthew (EUR) def. Paula Creamer (USA) 6 and 5
    - Sophie Gustafson (EUR) def. Stacy Lewis (USA) 2 up
    - Morgan Pressel (USA) def. Anna Nordqvist (EUR) 2 and 1
    - Juli Inkster (USA) vs. Laura Davies (EUR) halved
    - Vicky Hurst (USA) def. Melissa Reid (EUR) 2 up
    - Christel Boeljon (EUR) def. Brittany Lincicome (USA) 2 up
    - Brittany Lang (USA) def. Sandra Gal (EUR) 6 and 5
    - Christina Kim (USA) def. Maria Hjorth (EUR) 4 and 2
    - Suzann Pettersen (EUR) def. Michelle Wie (USA) 1 up
    - Ryann O'Toole (USA) vs. Caroline Hedwall (EUR) halved
    - Azahara Muñoz (EUR) def. Angela Stanford (USA) 1 up
    - Karen Stupples (EUR) def. Cristie Kerr (USA) 10 and 8 (Kerr WD at start of match)
      - Europe wins the Cup for the first time since 2003 and fourth time overall.
- PGA Tour:
  - FedEx Cup Playoffs: The Tour Championship in Atlanta (USA unless stated):
    - Winner: Bill Haas 272 (−8)^{PO}
      - Haas defeats Hunter Mahan on the third playoff hole to win his third PGA Tour title.
    - Final FedEx Cup standings: (1) Haas 2760 points (2) Webb Simpson 2745 (3) Luke Donald (ENG) 2567
- European Tour:
  - Austrian Golf Open in Atzenbrugg, Austria:
    - Winner: Kenneth Ferrie (ENG) 276 (−12)^{PO}
      - Ferrie defeats Simon Wakefield (ENG) on the first playoff hole to win his third European Tour title, and first in six years.

==== Gymnastics ====
- World Rhythmic Gymnastics Championships in Montpellier, France:
  - 5 Balls: (gold) Russia (Uliana Donskova, Ksenia Dudkina, Olga Ilina, Alina Makarenko, Anastasia Nazarenko, Natalia Pichuzhkina) 28.000 (silver) Italy (Elisa Blanchi, Romina Laurito, Marta Pagnini, Elisa Santoni, Anzhelika Savaryuk, Andreea Stefanescu) 27.000 (bronze) Bulgaria (Reneta Kamberova, Mihaela Maevska, Tsvetelina Nayedorova, Elena Todorova, Hristiana Todorova, Katrin Velkova) 26.950
  - 3 Ribbons + 2 Hoops: (gold) Bulgaria 27.400 (silver) Italy 26.725 (bronze) Israel (Moran Buzovski, Viktoriya Koshel, Noa Palatchy, Marina Shults, Polina Zakaluzny, Eliora Zholkovsky) 26.675
    - Israel win their first medal in groups event.

==== Motorcycle racing ====
- Superbike:
  - Imola World Championship round in Imola, Italy:
    - Race 1: (1) Jonathan Rea (GBR) (Honda CBR1000RR) (2) Noriyuki Haga (JPN) (Ducati 1098R) (3) Carlos Checa (ESP) (Ducati 1098R)
    - Race 2: (1) Checa (2) Haga (3) Leon Camier (GBR) (Aprilia RSV4)
      - Riders' championship standings (after 11 of 13 rounds): (1) Checa 417 points (2) Marco Melandri (ITA) (Yamaha YZF-R1) 320 (3) Max Biaggi (ITA) (Aprilia RSV4) 281
- Supersport:
  - Imola World Championship round in Imola, Italy: (1) Fabien Foret (FRA) (Honda CBR600RR) (2) Sam Lowes (GBR) (Honda CBR600RR) (3) Broc Parkes (AUS) (Kawasaki Ninja ZX-6R)
    - Riders' championship standings (after 10 of 12 rounds): (1) Chaz Davies (GBR) (Yamaha YZF-R6) 171 points (2) Foret 136 (3) David Salom (ESP) (Kawasaki Ninja ZX-6R) 123

==== Rugby league ====
- Super League Play-offs:
  - Preliminary Semi-Final: **Wigan Warriors** 44–0 Catalans Dragons

==== Rugby union ====
- World Cup in New Zealand (teams in **bold** qualify for 2015 World Cup):
  - Pool B in Wellington: Argentina 13–12 Scotland
    - Standings (after 3 matches unless stated): **England** 14 points, Argentina, Scotland 10, Georgia 0 (2), Romania 0.
  - Pool C in Rotorua: **Ireland** 62–12 Russia
    - Standings (after 3 matches unless stated): Ireland 13 points, **Australia** 10, Italy 5 (2), United States 4, Russia 1.
  - Pool D in Auckland: Fiji 7–27 Samoa
    - Standings (after 3 matches unless stated): **South Africa** 14 points, Samoa 10, Wales 5 (2), Fiji 5, Namibia 0.

==== Snooker ====
- Players Tour Championship – Event 5 in Sheffield, England:
  - Final: **Andrew Higginson** (ENG) 4–1 John Higgins (SCO)
    - Higginson wins his first professional title.
    - Order of Merit (after 5 of 12 events): (1) Ronnie O'Sullivan (ENG) 14,400 (2) Mark Selby (ENG) 12,200 (3) Higginson 12,000

==== Tennis ====
- ATP World Tour:
  - Open de Moselle in Metz, France:
    - Final: **Jo-Wilfried Tsonga** (FRA) def. Ivan Ljubičić (CRO) 6–3, 6–7(4), 6–3
      - Tsonga wins his sixth ATP Tour title.
  - BRD Năstase Țiriac Trophy in Bucharest, Romania:
    - Final: **Florian Mayer** (GER) def. Pablo Andújar (ESP) 6–3, 6–1
      - Mayer wins his first ATP Tour title.
- WTA Tour:
  - Hansol Korea Open in Seoul, South Korea:
    - Final: **María José Martínez Sánchez** (ESP) def. Galina Voskoboeva (KAZ) 7–6(0), 7–6(2)
      - Martínez Sánchez wins her second title of the year and fifth of her career.
  - Guangzhou International Women's Open in Guangzhou, China:
    - Final: **Chanelle Scheepers** (RSA) def. Magdaléna Rybáriková (SVK) 6–2, 6–2
      - Scheepers wins her first WTA Tour title.

==== Volleyball ====
- Women's European Championship in Italy and Serbia (teams in **bold** advance to the quarterfinals, teams in italics advance to the playoffs):
  - Pool A in Belgrade, Serbia:
    - France 0–3 Germany
    - Serbia 3–0 Ukraine
      - Standings (after 2 matches): Germany, Serbia 6 points, France, Ukraine 0.
  - Pool B in Monza, Italy:
    - Azerbaijan 3–1 Croatia
    - **Italy** 2–3 Turkey
      - Final standings: Italy 7 points, Turkey 5, Azerbaijan, Croatia 3.
  - Pool C in Zrenjanin, Serbia:
    - Poland 3–0 Czech Republic
    - Israel 0–3 Romania
      - Standings (after 2 matches): Poland 6 points, Czech Republic, Romania 3, Israel 0.
  - Pool D in Busto Arsizio, Italy:
    - **Russia** 3–1 Netherlands
    - Spain 3–0 Bulgaria
      - Final standings: Russia 9 points, Netherlands 6, Spain 3, Bulgaria 0.
- Men's South American Championship in Cuiabá, Brazil:
  - Colombia 3–1 Uruguay
  - Venezuela 3–0 Paraguay
  - Brazil 3–1 Argentina
    - Final standings: (gold) Brazil 12 points, (silver) Argentina 11, (bronze) Venezuela, Colombia, Chile 9, Paraguay 7, Uruguay 6.
    - Brazil win the title for the 28th time.
    - Brazil and Argentina both qualify for the World Cup.
- Men's Asian Championship in Tehran, Iran:
  - Pool E:
    - Japan 1–3 India
    - Iran 3–0 Pakistan
      - Standings (after 2 matches): Iran 6 points, India 3, Japan 2, Pakistan 1.
  - Pool F:
    - Australia 3–0 Sri Lanka
    - China 2–3 South Korea
      - Standings (after 2 matches): Australia 5 points, China 4, South Korea 3, Sri Lanka 0.
- Men's African Championship in Tangier, Morocco (teams in **bold** advance to the semifinals):
  - Group A:
    - **Cameroon** 3–1 Botswana
    - Morocco 0–3 **Tunisia**
      - Final standings: Cameroon 6 points, Tunisia 5, Morocco 4, Botswana 3.
  - Group B:
    - **Algeria** 3–0 South Africa
    - **Egypt** 3–0 Congo
      - Final standings: Egypt 6 points, Algeria 5, Congo 4, South Africa 3.

=== September 24, 2011 (Saturday) ===
==== Australian rules football ====
- AFL Finals Series:
  - Preliminary Final in Melbourne: **Geelong** 17.15 (117) – 10.9 (69) West Coast

==== Baseball ====
- Major League Baseball news: The San Francisco Giants, the reigning World Series champion, are eliminated from postseason contention after a 15–2 loss to the Arizona Diamondbacks. Thus for the eleventh consecutive year, the previous World Series champions will not defend their title.

==== Basketball ====
- FIBA Asia Championship in Wuhan, China:
  - Semifinals:
    - **Jordan** 75–61 Philippines
      - Jordan advances to the final for the first time.
    - South Korea 43–56 **China**
- FIBA Africa Championship for Women in Bamako, Mali:
  - Group A:
    - Ghana 0–20 Tunisia
    - Mozambique 76–55 DR Congo
    - Ivory Coast 44–57 Mali
      - Standings (after 2 games unless stated): Mali, Mozambique 4 points, Tunisia 3, Côte d'Ivoire 2, DR Congo 1 (1), Ghana 0 (1).
  - Group B:
    - Nigeria 60–31 Guinea
    - Cameroon 45–42 Rwanda
    - Angola 42–63 Senegal
      - Standings (after 2 games unless stated): Senegal 4 points, Rwanda, Nigeria 3, Cameroon 2 (1), Guinea 2, Angola 1 (1).
- FIBA Americas Championship for Women in Neiva, Colombia:
  - Group A:
    - Puerto Rico 50–67 Cuba
    - Chile 50–69 Colombia
  - Group B:
    - Brazil 117–34 Paraguay
    - Mexico 45–72 Canada

==== Cricket ====
- ICC Intercontinental Cup in Windhoek, day 2: Scotland 350 (115.4 overs; Christi Viljoen 5/94); Namibia 230/6 (74.0 overs). Namibia trail by 120 runs with 4 wickets remaining in the 1st innings.

==== Cycling ====
- Road World Championships in Copenhagen, Denmark:
  - Road race Junior Men: (gold) Pierre-Henri Lecuisinier (FRA) 2h 48' 58" (silver) Martijn Degreve (BEL) s.t. (bronze) Steven Lammertink (NED) s.t.
  - Road race Elite Women: (gold) Giorgia Bronzini (ITA) 3h 21' 28" (silver) Marianne Vos (NED) s.t. (bronze) Ina-Yoko Teutenberg (GER) s.t.
    - Bronzini wins the title for the second successive time.

==== Figure skating ====
- ISU Junior Grand Prix:
  - JGP Brașov Cup in Brașov, Romania:
    - Men: (gold) (silver) (bronze)
      - Standings (after 3 of 7 events): Joshua Farris (USA), Jason Brown (USA), Ryuju Hino (JPN) 15 points, Artur Dmitriev Jr. (RUS), Keiji Tanaka (JPN), Zhang He (CHN) 13.
    - Ice dancing: (gold) (silver) (bronze)
      - Standings (after 3 of 7 events): Victoria Sinitsina/Ruslan Zhiganshin (RUS), Nicole Orford/Thomas Williams (CAN), Maria Nosulia/Evgen Kholoniuk (UKR) 15 points, Lauri Bonacorsi/Travis Mager (USA), Anastasia Galyeta/Alexei Shumski (UKR), Evgenia Kosigina/Nikolai Moroshkin (RUS) 13.

==== Golf ====
- Solheim Cup in Dunshaughlin, County Meath, Ireland, day 2: Europe 8–8 United States
  - Morning Foursomes:
    - Caroline Hedwall/Sophie Gustafson (EUR) def. Angela Stanford/Stacy Lewis (USA) 6 and 5
    - Morgan Pressel/Ryann O'Toole (USA) def. Karen Stupples/Christel Boeljon (EUR) 3 and 2
    - Maria Hjorth/Anna Nordqvist (EUR) def. Brittany Lang/Juli Inkster (USA) 3 and 2
    - Cristie Kerr/Paula Creamer (USA) and Catriona Matthew/Azahara Muñoz (EUR) match halved
  - Afternoon Fourball:
    - Laura Davies/Melissa Reid (EUR) def. Michelle Wie/Lang (USA) 3 and 2
    - Pressel/Kerr (USA) def. Suzann Pettersen/Hedwall (EUR) 1 up
    - Lewis/O'Toole (USA) def. Sandra Gal/Boeljon (EUR) 2 and 1
    - Creamer/Brittany Lincicome (USA) def. Hjorth/Muñoz (EUR) 3 and 1

==== Gymnastics ====
- World Rhythmic Gymnastics Championships in Montpellier, France:
  - Groups all-around: (gold) Italy (Elisa Blanchi, Romina Laurito, Marta Pagnini, Elisa Santoni, Anzhelika Savaryuk, Andreea Stefanescu) 55.150 (silver) Russia (Uliana Donskova, Ksenia Dudkina, Olga Ilina, Alina Makarenko, Anastasia Nazarenko, Natalia Pichuzhkina) 54.850 (bronze) Bulgaria (Reneta Kamberova, Mihaela Maevska, Tsvetelina Nayedorova, Elena Todorova, Hristiana Todorova, Katrin Velkova) 54.125
    - Italy win the all-around title for the third successive time.

==== Mixed martial arts ====
- UFC 135 in Denver, Colorado, United States:
  - Light Heavyweight Championship: **Jon Jones** (USA) (c) def. Quinton Jackson (USA) via submission (rear naked choke)
  - Welterweight bout: **Josh Koscheck** (USA) def. Matt Hughes (USA) via KO (punches)
  - Heavyweight bout: **Mark Hunt** (NZL) def. Ben Rothwell (USA) via unanimous decision (29–28, 29–27, 30–27)
  - Heavyweight bout: **Travis Browne** (USA) def. Rob Broughton (ENG) via unanimous decision (30–27, 30–27, 30–27)
  - Lightweight bout: **Nate Diaz** (USA) def. Takanori Gomi (JPN) via submission (armbar)

==== Rugby league ====
- NRL Finals Series:
  - Preliminary Final in Melbourne: Melbourne Storm 12–20 **New Zealand Warriors**

==== Rugby union ====
- World Cup in New Zealand (team in **bold** qualify for quarter-finals):
  - Pool A in Auckland: **New Zealand** 37–17 France
    - Standings (after 3 matches unless stated): New Zealand 15 points, France 10, Tonga 5, Canada 4 (2), Japan 0.
  - Pool B in Dunedin: England 67–3 Romania
    - Standings (after 2 matches unless stated): England 14 points (3 matches), Scotland 9, Argentina 6, Georgia 0, Romania 0 (3).

==== Volleyball ====
- Women's European Championship in Italy and Serbia:
  - Pool A in Belgrade, Serbia:
    - Germany 3–0 Ukraine
    - France 1–3 Serbia
  - Pool B in Monza, Italy:
    - Croatia 3–0 Turkey
    - Italy 3–1 Azerbaijan
      - Standings (after 2 matches): Italy 6 points, Croatia, Turkey 3, Azerbaijan 0.
  - Pool C in Zrenjanin, Serbia:
    - Israel 0–3 Poland
    - Romania 0–3 Czech Republic
  - Pool D in Busto Arsizio, Italy:
    - Bulgaria 0–3 Netherlands
    - Russia 3–1 Spain
      - Standings (after 2 matches): Netherlands, Russia 6 points, Spain, Bulgaria 0.
- Men's South American Championship in Cuiabá, Brazil:
  - Brazil 3–0 Venezuela
  - Colombia 3–1 Paraguay
  - Chile 3–0 Uruguay
    - Standings (after 5 matches unless stated): Brazil, Argentina 10 points, Chile 9 (6), Venezuela, Colombia 7, Paraguay 6, Uruguay 5.
    - Brazil and Argentina both qualify for the World Cup.
- Men's African Championship in Tangier, Morocco:
  - Group A:
    - Botswana 0–3 Tunisia
    - Morocco 1–3 Cameroon
      - Standings (after 2 matches): Cameroon 4 points, Tunisia, Morocco 3, Botswana 2.
  - Group B:
    - Congo 3–0 South Africa
    - Egypt 3–1 Algeria
      - Standings (after 2 matches): Egypt 4 points, Algeria, Congo 3, South Africa 2.

=== September 23, 2011 (Friday) ===
==== Australian rules football ====
- AFL Finals Series:
  - Preliminary Final in Melbourne: **Collingwood** 10.8 (68)–9.11 (65) Hawthorn

==== Baseball ====
- Major League Baseball news:
  - The Texas Rangers clinch their second consecutive American League West title with a 5–3 win over the Seattle Mariners.
  - The Milwaukee Brewers clinch their first National League Central title with a 4–1 win over the Florida Marlins.
  - The Arizona Diamondbacks clinch their fifth National League West title, and first since 2007, with a 3–1 win over the San Francisco Giants.

==== Basketball ====
- FIBA Asia Championship in Wuhan, China:
  - Quarterfinals:
    - **Jordan** 88–84 Iran
    - **South Korea** 86–67 Japan
    - **Philippines** 95–78 Chinese Taipei
    - Lebanon 48–68 **China**
- FIBA Africa Championship for Women in Bamako, Mali:
  - Group A:
    - Ivory Coast 65–69 (OT) Mozambique
    - Mali 69–41 Tunisia
  - Group B:
    - Rwanda 69–35 Guinea
    - Senegal 86–62 Nigeria

==== Cricket ====
- West Indies in England:
  - 1st T20I in London: West Indies 125 (19.4 overs); England 128/0 (15.2 overs). **England win by 10 wickets; lead 2-match series 1–0.**
- ICC Intercontinental Cup in Windhoek, day 1: Scotland 268/7 (96 overs; Ryan Flannigan 102); Namibia.

==== Cycling ====
- Road World Championships in Copenhagen, Denmark:
  - Road race Junior Women: (gold) Lucy Garner (GBR) 1:46:17 (silver) Jessy Druyts (BEL) s.t. (bronze) Christina Siggaard (DEN) s.t.
  - Road race Under 23 Men: (gold) Arnaud Démare (FRA) 3:52:16 (silver) Adrien Petit (FRA) s.t. (bronze) Andrew Fenn (GBR) s.t.

==== Figure skating ====
- ISU Junior Grand Prix:
  - JGP Brașov Cup in Brașov, Romania:
    - Ladies: (gold) Polina Shelepen (RUS) 157.61 (silver) Polina Korobeynikova (RUS) 149.87 (bronze) Kim Hae-jin (KOR) 144.61
      - Standings (after 4 of 7 events): Shelepen 30 points (2 events), Korobeynikova 22 (2), Kim 18 (2), Yulia Lipnitskaya (RUS), Courtney Hicks (USA) 15 (1), Satoko Miyahara (JPN), Li Zijun (CHN), Risa Shoji (JPN) 13 (1).

==== Golf ====
- Solheim Cup in Dunshaughlin, County Meath, Ireland, day 1: Europe 4½–3½ United States
  - Morning Foursomes:
    - Michelle Wie/Cristie Kerr (USA) def. Maria Hjorth/Anna Nordqvist (EUR) 2 & 1
    - Paula Creamer/Brittany Lincicome (USA) def. Karen Stupples/Melissa Reid (EUR) 1 up
    - Catriona Matthew/Azahara Muñoz (EUR) def. Stacy Lewis/Angela Stanford (USA) 3 & 2
    - Suzann Pettersen/Sophie Gustafson (EUR) def. Brittany Lang/Juli Inkster (USA) 1 up
  - Afternoon Fourball:
    - Morgan Pressel/Creamer (USA) def. Laura Davies/Reid (EUR) 1 up
    - Christina Kim/Ryann O'Toole (USA) and Matthew/Sandra Gal (EUR) match halved
    - Gustafson/Caroline Hedwall (EUR) def. Vicky Hurst/Lincicome (USA) 5 & 4
    - Pettersen/Nordqvist (EUR) def. Wie/Kerr (USA) 2 & 1

==== Gymnastics ====
- World Rhythmic Gymnastics Championships in Montpellier, France (RUS unless stated):
  - Individual all-around: (gold) Yevgeniya Kanayeva 116.650 (silver) Daria Kondakova 116.600 (bronze) Aliya Garayeva (AZE) 112.450
    - Kabayeva wins her sixth title of the championships and equals her record in 2009. She also wins her third successive all-around title and 17th world title overall.

==== Rugby league ====
- NRL Finals Series:
  - Preliminary Final in Sydney: **Manly-Warringah Sea Eagles** 26–14 Brisbane Broncos
- Super League Play-offs:
  - Preliminary Semi-Finals: Huddersfield Giants 28–34 **Leeds Rhinos**

==== Rugby union ====
- World Cup in New Zealand:
  - Pool C in Wellington: Australia 67–5 United States
    - Standings (after 2 matches unless stated): Australia 10 points (3 matches), Ireland 8, Italy 5, United States 4 (3), Russia 1.

==== Volleyball ====
- Women's European Championship in Italy and Serbia:
  - Pool B in Monza, Italy:
    - Turkey 3–1 Azerbaijan
    - Italy 3–0 Croatia
  - Pool D in Busto Arsizio, Italy:
    - Netherlands 3–0 Spain
    - Russia 3–0 Bulgaria
- Women's Asian Championship in Taipei, Chinese Taipei:
  - Bronze medal match: (bronze) **South Korea** 3–2 Thailand
  - Final: (gold) **China** 3–1 (silver) Japan
    - China win the title for the 12th time.
- Men's South American Championship in Cuiabá, Brazil:
  - Venezuela 3–0 Uruguay
  - Chile 3–2 Colombia
  - Argentina 3–0 Paraguay
    - Standings (after 4 matches unless stated): Argentina 10 points (5 matches), Brazil 8, Chile 7 (5), Venezuela 6, Colombia, Paraguay 5, Uruguay 4.
    - Argentina qualifies for the World Cup.
- Men's Asian Championship in Tehran, Iran (teams in **bold** advance to the quarterfinals):
  - Pool A:
    - **Iran** 3–0 **India**
    - Afghanistan 0–3 Chinese Taipei
      - Final standings: Iran 9 points, India 5, Chinese Taipei 4, Afghanistan 0.
  - Pool B:
    - **Sri Lanka** 3–2 Indonesia
    - **China** 3–0 Uzbekistan
      - Final standings: China 9 points, Sri Lanka 5, Indonesia 4, Uzbekistan 0.
  - Pool C:
    - Thailand 0–3 **Pakistan**
    - **Japan** 3–0 Kazakhstan
      - Final standings: Japan 8 points, Pakistan 6, Kazakhstan 3, Thailand 1.
  - Pool D:
    - Qatar 0–3 **South Korea**
    - Turkmenistan 0–3 **Australia**
      - Final standings: Australia 8 points, South Korea 7, Qatar 3, Turkmenistan 0.
- Men's African Championship in Tangier, Morocco:
  - Group A:
    - Cameroon 3–2 Tunisia
    - Morocco 3–0 Botswana
  - Group B:
    - Egypt 3–0 South Africa
    - Algeria 3–1 Congo

=== September 22, 2011 (Thursday) ===
==== Football (soccer) ====
- UEFA Women's Euro 2013 qualifying Matchday 2:
  - Group 2: Kazakhstan 2–0 Turkey
    - Standings (after 2 matches unless stated): Spain, Germany 3 points (1 match), Switzerland, Romania, Kazakhstan 3, Turkey 0.
  - Group 4: Republic of Ireland 1–3 France
    - Standings: France 6 points (2 matches), Ireland 3 (2), Scotland 0 (0), Wales, Israel 0 (1).
  - Group 6: England 4–0 Slovenia
    - Standings: England 4 points (2 matches), Netherlands 3 (1), Serbia 1 (2), Slovenia 0 (0), Croatia 0 (1).
- Copa Sudamericana Second stage, second leg (first leg score in parentheses):
  - Deportivo Cali (Colombia) 1–1 (1–1) (Colombia) **Santa Fe**. 2–2 on points, 2–2 on aggregate; Santa Fe win 6–5 on penalties.
  - Trujillanos (Venezuela) 0–1 (1–4) (Ecuador) **LDU Quito**. LDU Quito win 6–0 on points.
- CONCACAF Champions League group stage Matchday 4:
  - Group A: Motagua (Honduras) 0–2 (Mexico) Morelia
    - Standings (after 4 matches): Morelia, (Costa Rica) Alajuelense 9 points, (United States) Los Angeles Galaxy 6, Motagua 0.
  - Group B: Santos Laguna (Mexico) 6–0 (El Salvador) Isidro Metapán
    - Standings (after 4 matches): Santos Laguna 9 points, Isidro Metapán 6, (Honduras) Real España, (United States) Colorado Rapids 4.

==== Gymnastics ====
- World Rhythmic Gymnastics Championships in Montpellier, France (RUS unless stated):
  - Clubs: (gold) Yevgeniya Kanayeva 29.600 (silver) Daria Kondakova 29.300 (bronze) Silviya Miteva (BUL) 28.300
  - Ribbon: (gold) Kanayeva 29.400 (silver) Kondakova 29.250 (bronze) Miteva 28.300
    - Kabayeva wins the ribbon event for the second time.
  - Teams: (gold) Russia (Kanayeva, Kondakova, Daria Dmitrieva, Alexandra Merkulova) 290.275 (silver) Belarus (Liubov Charkashyna, Melitina Staniouta, Aliana Narkevich, Hanna Rabtsava) 272.500 (bronze) Ukraine (Alina Maksymenko, Ganna Rizatdinova, Victoriya Mazur, Victoriia Shynkarenko) 269.675
    - Kanayeva wins her fifth title of the championships, and her fourth team title and 16th world title overall.
    - Kondakova and Dmitrieva both win their third team title and fourth world title overall.

==== Rugby union ====
- World Cup in New Zealand:
  - Pool D in Auckland: South Africa 87–0 Namibia
    - Standings (after 2 matches unless stated): South Africa 14 points (3 matches), Samoa 6, Wales, Fiji 5, Namibia 0 (3).
    - South Africa qualifies for 2015 World Cup.

==== Volleyball ====
- Women's Asian Championship in Taipei, Chinese Taipei:
  - Semifinals:
    - **Japan** 3–2 Thailand
    - **China** 3–1 South Korea
      - China qualifies for the World Cup.
- Men's South American Championship in Cuiabá, Brazil:
  - Chile 3–0 Paraguay
  - Argentina 3–0 Venezuela
  - Brazil 3–0 Colombia
    - Standings (after 3 matches unless stated): Brazil, Argentina 8 points (4 matches), Chile 5 (4), Venezuela, Colombia, Paraguay 4, Uruguay 3.
- Men's Asian Championship in Tehran, Iran (teams in **bold** advance to the quarterfinals):
  - Pool A:
    - **India** 3–0 Afghanistan
    - Chinese Taipei 0–3 **Iran**
      - Standings (after 2 matches): Iran 6 points, India 5, Chinese Taipei 1, Afghanistan 0.
  - Pool B:
    - Indonesia 0–3 **China**
    - Uzbekistan 0–3 Sri Lanka
      - Standings (after 2 matches): China 6 points, Sri Lanka, Indonesia 3, Uzbekistan 0.
  - Pool C:
    - Pakistan 2–3 Japan
    - Kazakhstan 3–2 Thailand
      - Standings (after 2 matches): Japan 5 points, Kazakhstan, Pakistan 3, Thailand 1.
  - Pool D:
    - **Australia** 3–0 Qatar
    - South Korea 3–0 Turkmenistan
      - Standings (after 2 matches): Australia 5 points, South Korea 4, Qatar 3, Turkmenistan 0.

=== September 21, 2011 (Wednesday) ===
==== Baseball ====
- Major League Baseball news: The New York Yankees clinch a playoff berth with a 4–2 win over the Tampa Bay Rays.

==== Basketball ====
- FIBA Asia Championship in Wuhan, China (teams in **bold** qualify for quarterfinals):
  - Group E:
    - **Lebanon** 101–53 Uzbekistan
    - Malaysia 62–109 **Chinese Taipei**
    - **South Korea** 62–79 **Iran**
      - Final standings: Iran 10 points, Korea 9 points, Chinese Taipei 8, Lebanon 7, Malaysia 6, Uzbekistan 5.
  - Group F:
    - **Jordan** 94–80 United Arab Emirates
    - Syria 52–75 **Philippines**
    - **Japan** 58–84 **China**
      - Final standings: China 10 points, Philippines 9, Japan 8, Jordan 7, Syria 6, United Arab Emirates 5.

==== Cycling ====
- Road World Championships in Copenhagen, Denmark:
  - Time trial Elite Men: (gold) Tony Martin (GER) 53:43.85 (silver) Bradley Wiggins (GBR) 54:59.68 (bronze) Fabian Cancellara (SUI) 55:04.44

==== Football (soccer) ====
- UEFA Women's Euro 2013 qualifying Matchday 2:
  - Group 1: Poland 0–2 Russia
  - Group 2: Switzerland 4–1 Romania
    - Standings (after 1 match unless stated): Spain, Germany 3 points, Switzerland, Romania 3 (2), Kazakhstan, Turkey 0.
  - Group 3:
    - Norway 6–0 Hungary
    - Iceland 0–0 Belgium
      - Standings: Iceland 7 points (3 matches), Belgium 4 (2), Norway 3 (2), Northern Ireland 0 (0), Bulgaria 0 (1), Hungary 0 (2).
  - Group 6: Netherlands 6–0 Serbia
    - Standings: Netherlands 3 points (1 match), England 1 (1), Serbia 1 (2), Slovenia, Croatia 0 (0).
  - Group 7: Armenia 0–5 Denmark
    - Standings (after 1 match unless stated): Portugal, Denmark 3 points, Czech Republic, Austria 1, Armenia 0 (2).
- 2012 Olympics Men's Asian Qualifiers Preliminary Round 3, Matchday 1:
  - Group A:
    - South Korea 2–0 Oman
    - Saudi Arabia 1–1 Qatar
  - Group B:
    - Uzbekistan 2–0 Iraq
    - Australia 0–0 United Arab Emirates
  - Group C:
    - Japan 2–0 Malaysia
    - Syria 3–1 Bahrain
- Copa Sudamericana Second stage, second leg (first leg scores in parentheses):
  - Nacional (Uruguay) 0–2 (0–1) Universidad de Chile — match abandoned due to crowd trouble
  - **Libertad** (Paraguay) 1–0 (1–0) (Colombia) La Equidad. Libertad win 6–0 on points.
- CONCACAF Champions League group stage Matchday 4:
  - Group A: Alajuelense (Costa Rica) 1–0 (United States) Los Angeles Galaxy
    - Standings: Alajuense 9 points (4 matches), (Mexico) Morelia 6 (3), Los Angeles Galaxy 6 (4), (Honduras) Motagua 0 (3).
  - Group B: Colorado Rapids (United States) 1–2 (Honduras) Real España
    - Standings: (Mexico) Santos Laguna, (El Salvador) Isidro Metapán 6 points (3 matches), Real España, Colorado Rapids 4 (4).
  - Group C: FC Dallas (United States) 0–2 (Mexico) UNAM
    - Standings (after 4 matches): UNAM, FC Dallas 7 points, (Canada) Toronto FC 6, (Panama) Tauro 2.

==== Rugby union ====
- World Cup in New Zealand:
  - Pool A in Whangarei: Tonga 31–18 Japan
    - Standings (after 2 matches unless stated): New Zealand, France 10 points, Tonga 5 (3), Canada 4, Japan 0 (3).

==== Surfing ====
- Men's World Tour:
  - Hurley Pro in Trestles, California, United States: (1) Kelly Slater (USA) (2) Owen Wright (AUS) (3) Heitor Alves (BRA) & Julian Wilson (AUS)
    - Standings (after 7 of 11 events): (1) Slater 44,950 points (2) Wright 39,900 (3) Joel Parkinson (AUS) 35,400

==== Volleyball ====
- Women's Asian Championship in Taipei, Chinese Taipei:
  - Quarterfinals:
    - **Japan** 3–0 Iran
    - **China** 3–0 Vietnam
    - Chinese Taipei 0–3 **Thailand**
    - **South Korea** 3–1 North Korea
- Men's South American Championship in Cuiabá, Brazil:
  - Venezuela 3–0 Chile
  - Argentina 3–0 Uruguay
  - Brazil 3–0 Paraguay
    - Standings (after 3 matches unless stated): Brazil, Argentina 6 points, Venezuela, Colombia, Paraguay 3 (2), Chile, Uruguay 3.
- Men's Asian Championship in Tehran, Iran:
  - Pool A:
    - India 3–2 Chinese Taipei
    - Afghanistan 0–3 Iran
  - Pool B:
    - China 3–0 Sri Lanka
    - Indonesia 3–1 Uzbekistan
  - Pool C:
    - Japan 3–0 Thailand
    - Pakistan 3–2 Kazakhstan
  - Pool D:
    - Qatar 3–0 Turkmenistan
    - Australia 3–2 South Korea

=== September 20, 2011 (Tuesday) ===
==== Basketball ====
- FIBA Asia Championship in Wuhan, China (teams in **bold** qualify for quarterfinals):
  - Group E:
    - Uzbekistan 75–80 Malaysia
    - **Iran** 76–45 Lebanon
    - Chinese Taipei 61–82 **South Korea**
      - Standings (after 4 games): Iran, South Korea 8 points, Chinese Taipei 6, Lebanon, Malaysia 5, Uzbekistan 4.
  - Group F:
    - United Arab Emirates 73–80 Syria
    - **Philippines** 83–76 **Japan**
    - **China** 93–60 Jordan
      - Standings (after 4 games): China 8 points, Philippines, Japan 7, Jordan, Syria 5, United Arab Emirates 4.

==== Cricket ====
- Australia in Sri Lanka:
  - 3rd Test in Colombo, day 5: Australia 316 & 488 (138.5 overs, Phillip Hughes 126, Michael Clarke 112); Sri Lanka 473 & 7/0 (2 overs). **Match drawn, Australia win the series 1–0**.
- ICC Intercontinental Cup One-Day:
  - 8th ODI in Dublin: Ireland 249/7 (50 overs); Canada 193 (46.3 overs). **Ireland win by 56 runs.**
    - Standings (after 4 matches unless stated): Ireland 8 points, Afghanistan, Scotland 4 (2), Netherlands 4, Kenya 2, United Arab Emirates 2 (2), Namibia 0 (2), Canada 0.

==== Cycling ====
- Road World Championships in Copenhagen, Denmark:
  - Time trial Junior Men: (gold) Mads Würtz Schmidt (DEN) 35:07.68 (silver) James Oram (NZL) 35:11.79 (bronze) David Edwards (AUS) 35:28.47
  - Time trial Elite Women: (gold) Judith Arndt (GER) 37:07.38 (silver) Linda Villumsen (NZL) 37:29.11 (bronze) Emma Pooley (GBR) 37:31.51
    - Arndt wins her second world championship title.

==== Football (soccer) ====
- Copa Sudamericana Second stage second leg (first leg scores in parentheses):
  - Emelec (Ecuador) 1–2 (1–2) (Paraguay) **Olimpia**. Olimpia win 6–0 on points.
  - **Aurora** (Bolivia) 5–2 (1–1) (Paraguay) Nacional. Aurora win 4–1 on points.
- CONCACAF Champions League group stage Matchday 4:
  - Group C: Toronto FC (Canada) 1–0 (Panama) Tauro
    - Standings: (United States) FC Dallas 7 points (3 matches), Toronto 6 (4), (Mexico) UNAM 4 (3), Tauro 2 (4).
  - Group D:
    - Monterrey (Mexico) 3–1 (Guatemala) Comunicaciones
    - Seattle Sounders FC (United States) 0–1 (Costa Rica) Herediano
      - Standings (after 4 matches): Seattle Sounders 9 points, Monterrey, Comunicaciones 6, Herediano 3.

==== Gymnastics ====
- World Rhythmic Gymnastics Championships in Montpellier, France (RUS unless stated):
  - Hoop: (gold) Yevgeniya Kanayeva 29.300 (silver) Daria Kondakova 29.050 (bronze) Neta Rivkin (ISR) 28.000
    - Rivkin becomes the first world championship medallist from Israel.
  - Ball: (gold) Kanayeva 29.600 (silver) Kondakova 29.325 (bronze) Liubov Charkashyna (BLR) 28.450
    - Kanayeva wins both events for the third time and increases her record to 13 world titles overall.

==== Rugby union ====
- World Cup in New Zealand:
  - Pool C in Nelson: Italy 53–17 Russia
    - Standings (after 2 matches): Ireland 8 points, Australia, Italy 5, United States 4, Russia 1.

==== Volleyball ====
- Men's South American Championship in Cuiabá, Brazil:
  - Argentina 3–0 Colombia
  - Uruguay 0–3 Paraguay
  - Brazil 3–0 Chile
    - Standings (after 2 matches unless stated): Brazil, Argentina 4 points, Colombia 3, Paraguay 2 (1), Chile, Uruguay 2, Venezuela 1 (1).

=== September 19, 2011 (Monday) ===
==== American football ====
- NFL Monday Night Football, Week 2: New York Giants 28, St. Louis Rams 16

==== Auto racing ====
- Sprint Cup Series – Chase for the Sprint Cup:
  - GEICO 400 in Joliet, Illinois: (1) (Indiana) Tony Stewart (Chevrolet; Stewart Haas Racing) (2) (California) Kevin Harvick (Chevrolet; Richard Childress Racing) (3) (North Carolina) Dale Earnhardt Jr. (Chevrolet; Hendrick Motorsports)
    - Drivers' championship standings (after 27 of 36 races): (1) Harvick 2054 points (2) Stewart 2047 (3) (Missouri) Carl Edwards (Ford; Roush Fenway Racing) 2044

==== Baseball ====
- Major League Baseball news: New York Yankees closer Mariano Rivera earns his 602nd career save, breaking Trevor Hoffman's record for most career saves.

==== Basketball ====
- FIBA Asia Championship in Wuhan, China (teams in **bold** qualify for quarterfinals):
  - Group E:
    - Malaysia 36–121 **Iran**
    - Lebanon 58–60 Chinese Taipei
    - **South Korea** 106–57 Uzbekistan
      - Standings (after 3 games): Iran, South Korea 6 points, Chinese Taipei 5, Lebanon 4, Malaysia, Uzbekistan 3.
  - Group F:
    - Jordan 64–72 Philippines
    - **Japan** 101–61 United Arab Emirates
    - Syria 71–90 **China**
      - Standings (after 3 games): Japan, China 6 points, Philippines 5, Jordan 4, Syria, United Arab Emirates 3.

==== Cricket ====
- Australia in Sri Lanka:
  - 3rd Test in Colombo, day 4: Australia 316 & 209/3 (68 overs; Phillip Hughes 122*); Sri Lanka 473 (174 overs; Angelo Mathews 105*). Australia lead by 52 runs with 7 wickets remaining.
- ICC Intercontinental Cup One-Day:
  - 7th ODI in Dublin: Ireland 328/6 (50 overs); Canada 195 (48.4 overs). **Ireland win by 133 runs.**
    - Standings: Ireland 6 points (3 matches), Afghanistan, Scotland 4 (2), Netherlands 4 (4), Kenya 2 (4), United Arab Emirates 2 (2), Namibia 0 (2), Canada 0 (3).

==== Cycling ====
- Road World Championships in Copenhagen, Denmark:
  - Time trial Junior Women: (gold) Jessica Allen (AUS) 19:18.63 (silver) Elinor Barker (GBR) 19:20.47 (bronze) Mieke Kröger (GER) 19:21.43
  - Time trial Under 23 Men: (gold) Luke Durbridge (AUS) 42:47.13 (silver) Rasmus Quaade (DEN) 43:22.81 (bronze) Michael Hepburn (AUS) 43:33.60

==== Tennis ====
- Davis Cup World Group play-offs, day 3 (team in **bold** will play in 2012 World Group): Australia 2–3 **Switzerland**

==== Volleyball ====
- Women's Asian Championship in Taipei, Chinese Taipei:
  - Pool E:
    - North Korea 3–0 Iran
    - Chinese Taipei 0–3 China
      - Final standings: China 9 points, Chinese Taipei 6, North Korea 3, Iran 0.
  - Pool F:
    - South Korea 3–0 Vietnam
    - Thailand 0–3 Japan
      - Final standings: Japan 8 points, South Korea 7, Thailand 3, Vietnam 0.
- Men's South American Championship in Cuiabá, Brazil:
  - Argentina 3–0 Chile
  - Brazil 3–0 Uruguay
  - Venezuela 2–3 Colombia

=== September 18, 2011 (Sunday) ===
==== American football ====
- NFL week 2:
  - Cleveland Browns 27, Indianapolis Colts 19
  - Buffalo Bills 38, Oakland Raiders 35
  - Detroit Lions 48, Kansas City Chiefs 3
  - New Orleans Saints 30, Chicago Bears 13
  - Tampa Bay Buccaneers 24, Minnesota Vikings 20
  - Green Bay Packers 30, Carolina Panthers 23
  - Pittsburgh Steelers 24, Seattle Seahawks 0
  - Tennessee Titans 26, Baltimore Ravens 13
  - Washington Redskins 22, Arizona Cardinals 21
  - New York Jets 32, Jacksonville Jaguars 3
  - Dallas Cowboys 27, San Francisco 49ers 24 (OT)
  - Denver Broncos 24, Cincinnati Bengals 22
  - New England Patriots 35, San Diego Chargers 21
  - Houston Texans 23, Miami Dolphins 13
  - Sunday Night Football: Atlanta Falcons 35, Philadelphia Eagles 31

==== Auto racing ====
- Sprint Cup Series – Chase for the Sprint Cup:
  - GEICO 400 in Joliet, Illinois: Race postponed to 12:00 pm EDT on September 19 due to rain.
- IndyCar Series:
  - Indy Japan: The Final in Motegi, Japan: (1) Scott Dixon (NZL) (Chip Ganassi Racing) (2) Will Power (AUS) (Team Penske) (3) Marco Andretti (USA) (Andretti Autosport)
    - Drivers' championship standings (after 16 of 18 races): (1) Power 542 points (2) Dario Franchitti (GBR) (Chip Ganassi Racing) 531 (3) Dixon 483
    - Final road course standings: (1) Power 397 points (2) Franchitti 367 (3) Dixon 302
- V8 Supercars:
  - L&H 500 in Phillip Island, Victoria (all AUS): (1) Craig Lowndes/Mark Skaife (Triple Eight Race Engineering; Holden VE Commodore) (2) Jamie Whincup/Andrew Thompson (Triple Eight Race Engineering; Holden VE Commodore) (3) Will Davison/Luke Youlden (Ford Performance Racing; Ford FG Falcon)
    - Drivers' championship standings (after 19 of 28 races): (1) Whincup 2145 points (2) Lowndes 2053 (3) Shane van Gisbergen (NZL) (Stone Brothers Racing; Ford FG Falcon) 1716

==== Badminton ====
- BWF Super Series:
  - China Masters Super Series in Changzhou:
    - Men's singles: **Chen Long** (CHN) def. Chen Jin (CHN) 21–16, 22–20
    - Women's singles: **Wang Shixian** (CHN) def. Jiang Yanjiao (CHN) 21–16, 8–5 Ret.
    - Men's doubles: **Jung Jae-sung/Lee Yong-dae** (KOR) def. Cai Yun/Fu Haifeng (CHN) 21–17, 21–10
    - Women's doubles: **Huan Xia/Tang Jinhua** (CHN) def. Wang Xiaoli/Yu Yang (CHN) 21–19 Ret.
    - Mixed doubles: **Xu Chen/Ma Jin** (CHN) def. Yoo Yeon-seong/Jang Ye-na (KOR) 21–13, 21–16

==== Basketball ====
- EuroBasket in Kaunas, Lithuania:
  - Bronze medal game: North Macedonia 68–72 (bronze) **Russia**
  - Final: (gold) **Spain** 98–85 (silver) France
    - Spain win the title for the second successive time.
    - Spain and France both qualify for 2012 Olympics.

==== College sports ====
- The Atlantic Coast Conference votes to accept the University of Pittsburgh and Syracuse University's applications for membership. Pitt and Syracuse are to leave the Big East Conference.

==== Cricket ====
- Australia in Sri Lanka:
  - 3rd Test in Colombo, day 3: Australia 316; Sri Lanka 428/6 (155 overs). Sri Lanka lead by 112 runs with 4 wickets remaining in the 1st innings.
- Pakistan in Zimbabwe:
  - 2nd T20 in Harare: Pakistan 141/7 (20 overs); Zimbabwe 136/7 (20 overs). **Pakistan win by 5 runs; win 2-match series 2–0.**

==== Equestrianism ====
- European Show Jumping Championship in Madrid:
  - Individual result: (gold) Rolf-Göran Bengtsson (SWE) on Ninja (silver) Carsten-Otto Nagel (GER) on Corradina (bronze) Nick Skelton (GBR) on Carlo

==== Football (soccer) ====
- 2014 FIFA World Cup qualification – CONCACAF second round group E: Saint Vincent and the Grenadines 2–1 Grenada
  - Standings (after 2 matches): Guatemala 6 points, Belize, Saint Vincent and the Grenadines 3, Grenada 0.
- UEFA Women's Euro 2013 qualifying Matchday 1:
  - Group 5: Estonia 1–4 Ukraine
    - Standings: Ukraine, Belarus 3 points (1 match), Finland, Slovakia 0 (0), Estonia 0 (2).
- CAF Champions League Group stage Matchday 6 (teams in **bold** advance to the semifinals):
  - Group A:
    - Raja Casablanca (Morocco) 0–0 (Sudan) **Al-Hilal**
    - **Enyimba** (Nigeria) 2–0 (Cameroon) Coton Sport
      - Final standings: Enyimba 14 points, Al-Hilal 8, Coton Sport 7, Raja Casablanca 3.
- CAF Confederation Cup Group stage Matchday 6 (teams in **bold** advance to the semifinals):
  - Group A:
    - Kaduna United (Nigeria) 0–1 (Tunisia) **Club Africain**
    - ASEC Mimosas (Ivory Coast) 1–0 (Angola) **Inter Luanda**
      - Final standings: Club Africain 11 points, Inter Luanda 10, ASEC Mimosas 7, Kaduna United 5.

==== Gaelic football ====
- All-Ireland Championship Final in Dublin: Kerry 1–11–1–12 **Dublin**
  - Dublin win the title for the first time since 1995, and 23rd time overall.

==== Golf ====
- PGA Tour:
  - FedEx Cup Playoffs: BMW Championship in Lemont, Illinois:
    - Winner: Justin Rose (ENG) 271 (−13)
      - Rose wins his third PGA Tour title.
      - FedEx Cup points: (1) Webb Simpson (USA) 5261 points (2) Dustin Johnson (USA) 3841 (3) Rose 3748
- European Tour:
  - Vivendi Trophy with Seve Ballesteros in Saint-Nom-la-Bretèche, France: **Great Britain & Ireland** (United Kingdom) (Republic of Ireland) 15½–12½ Continental Europe
    - Great Britain & Ireland win for the sixth successive time.
- LPGA Tour:
  - Navistar LPGA Classic in Prattville, Alabama:
    - Winner: Lexi Thompson (USA) 271 (−17)
      - At the age of 16 years, 220 days, Thompson becomes the youngest player to win on the LPGA Tour.
- Champions Tour:
  - Songdo IBD Championship in Incheon, South Korea:
    - Winner: Jay Don Blake (USA) 203 (−13)^{PO}
      - Blake wins a four-man playoff to win his first Champions Tour title.

==== Motorcycle racing ====
- Moto GP:
  - Aragon Grand Prix in Alcañiz, Spain (ESP unless stated):
    - MotoGP: (1) Casey Stoner (AUS) (Honda) (2) Dani Pedrosa (Honda) (3) Jorge Lorenzo (Yamaha)
      - Riders' championship standings (after 14 of 18 races): (1) Stoner 284 points (2) Lorenzo 240 (3) Andrea Dovizioso (ITA) (Honda) 185
    - Moto2: (1) Marc Márquez (Suter) (2) Andrea Iannone (ITA) (Suter) (3) Simone Corsi (ITA) (FTR)
      - Riders' championship standings (after 13 of 17 races): (1) Stefan Bradl (GER) (Kalex) 221 points (2) Márquez 215 (3) Iannone 132
    - 125cc: (1) Nicolás Terol (Aprilia) (2) Johann Zarco (FRA) (Derbi) (3) Maverick Viñales (Aprilia)
      - Riders' championship standings (after 13 of 17 races): (1) Terol 241 points (2) Zarco 205 (3) Viñales 177

==== Rugby league ====
- Super League Play-offs:
  - Qualifying and Elimination Finals:
    - **Leeds Rhinos** 42–10 Hull
    - Wigan Warriors 18–26 **St. Helens**

==== Rugby union ====
- World Cup in New Zealand:
  - Pool A in Napier: France 46–19 Canada
    - Standings (after 2 matches): New Zealand, France 10 points, Canada 4, Tonga 1, Japan 0.
  - Pool B in Dunedin: England 41–10 Georgia
    - Standings (after 2 matches): England, Scotland 9 points, Argentina 6, Georgia, Romania 0.
  - Pool D in Hamilton: Wales 17–10 Samoa
    - Standings (after 2 matches): South Africa 9 points, Samoa 6, Wales, Fiji 5, Namibia 0.

==== Snooker ====
- Brazil Masters in Florianópolis, Brazil:
  - Semi-finals:
    - Peter Ebdon (ENG) 2–5 **Graeme Dott** (SCO)
    - **Shaun Murphy** (ENG) 5–1 Stephen Hendry (SCO)
  - Final: Dott 0–5 **Murphy**
    - Murphy wins his 12th professional title.

==== Tennis ====
- Davis Cup World Group Semifinals, day 3:
  - Serbia 2–3 **Argentina**
  - **Spain** 4–1 France
    - Spain and Argentina will meet in a repeat of 2008 Final.
- Davis Cup World Group play-offs, day 3 (teams in **bold** will play in 2012 World Group):
  - Romania 0–5 **Czech Republic**
  - **Russia** 3–2 Brazil
  - Israel 2–3 **Canada**
  - South Africa 1–4 **Croatia**
  - Chile 1–4 **Italy**
  - **Japan** 4–1 India
  - Belgium 1–4 **Austria**
  - Australia 2–2 Switzerland – Play suspended due to darkness
- WTA Tour:
  - Bell Challenge in Quebec City, Canada:
    - Final: **Barbora Záhlavová-Strýcová** (CZE) def. Marina Erakovic (NZL) 4–6, 6–1, 6–0.
      - Záhlavová-Strýcová wins her first career title.

==== Volleyball ====
- Men's European Championship in Vienna, Austria:
  - Bronze medal match: (bronze) **Poland** 3–1 Russia
  - Final: (silver) Italy 1–3 (gold) **Serbia**
    - Serbia win the title for the second time.
    - Serbia and Italy both qualify for the World Cup.
- Women's Asian Championship in Taipei, Chinese Taipei:
  - Pool E:
    - Chinese Taipei 3–1 North Korea
    - China 3–0 Iran
      - Standings (after 2 matches): China, Chinese Taipei 6 points, North Korea, Iran 0.
  - Pool F:
    - Thailand 1–3 South Korea
    - Japan 3–0 Vietnam
      - Standings (after 2 matches): Japan 5 points, South Korea 4, Thailand 3, Vietnam 0.

==== Wrestling ====
- World Championships in Istanbul, Turkey:
  - Men's freestyle:
    - 66 kg: (gold) Mehdi Taghavi (IRI) (silver) Tatsuhiro Yonemitsu (JPN) (bronze) Jabrayil Hasanov (AZE) & Liván López (CUB)
      - Taghavi wins the title for the second time.
    - 74 kg: (gold) Jordan Burroughs (USA) (silver) Sadegh Goudarzi (IRI) (bronze) Ashraf Aliyev (AZE) & Davit Khutsishvili (GEO)
    - 120 kg: (gold) Aleksey Shemarov (BLR) (silver) Beylal Makhov (RUS) (bronze) Jamaladdin Magomedov (AZE) & Davit Modzmanashvili (GEO)

=== September 17, 2011 (Saturday) ===
==== American football ====
- NCAA AP Top 10:
  - (1) Oklahoma 23, (5) Florida State 13
  - (2) Alabama 41, North Texas 0
  - (6) Stanford 37, Arizona 0
  - In Chicago: (7) Wisconsin 49, Northern Illinois 7
  - (8) Oklahoma State 59, Tulsa 33
  - (9) Texas A&M 37, Idaho 7
  - (10) South Carolina 24, Navy 21
- Other games:
  - Clemson 38, (21) Auburn 24
  - Notre Dame 31, (15) Michigan State 13

==== Australian rules football ====
- AFL Finals Series:
  - First Semi-Final in Perth: **West Coast** 15.11 (101)–15.8 (98) Carlton

==== Auto racing ====
- Nationwide Series:
  - Dollar General 300 in Joliet, Illinois: (1) (Michigan) Brad Keselowski (Dodge; Penske Racing) (2) (Missouri) Carl Edwards (Ford; Roush Fenway Racing) (3) (Idaho) Brian Scott (Toyota; Joe Gibbs Racing)
    - Drivers' championship standings (after 28 of 34 races): (1) (Mississippi) Ricky Stenhouse Jr. (Ford; Roush Fenway Racing) 986 points (2) (Virginia) Elliott Sadler (Chevrolet; Kevin Harvick Incorporated) 972 (3) (Georgia (U.S. state)) Reed Sorenson (Chevrolet; Turner Motorsports) 939

==== Basketball ====
- EuroBasket in Kaunas, Lithuania:
  - Seventh place game: **Slovenia** 72–68 Serbia
  - Fifth place game: **Lithuania** 73–69 Greece
- FIBA Asia Championship in Wuhan, China (teams in **bold** advance to the Second round):
  - Group A:
    - **South Korea** 84–53 India
    - **Malaysia** 59–87 **Lebanon**
      - Final standings: South Korea 6 points, Lebanon 5, Malaysia 4, India 3.
  - Group B:
    - **Chinese Taipei** 94–78 Qatar
    - **Iran** 132–38 **Uzbekistan**
      - Final standings: Iran 6 points, Chinese Taipei 5, Uzbekistan 4, Qatar 3.
  - Group C:
    - **Syria** 55–77 **Japan**
    - **Jordan** 89–59 Indonesia
      - Final standings: Japan 6 points, Jordan 5, Syria 4, Indonesia 3.
  - Group D:
    - Bahrain 71–113 **Philippines**
    - **China** 75–60 **United Arab Emirates**
      - Final standings: China 6 points, Philippines 5, United Arab Emirates 4, Bahrain 3.

==== Cricket ====
- Australia in Sri Lanka:
  - 3rd Test in Colombo, day 2: Australia 316 (104.3 overs, Michael Hussey 118); Sri Lanka 166/2 (65 overs). Sri Lanka trail by 150 runs with 8 wickets remaining in the 1st innings.
- (England) Clydesdale Bank 40 Final in London: Somerset 214 (39.2 overs); Surrey Lions 189/5 (27.3/30 overs). **Surrey win by 5 wickets (D/L)**.

==== Figure skating ====
- ISU Junior Grand Prix:
  - JGP Baltic Cup in Gdańsk, Poland:
    - Men: (gold) Joshua Farris (USA) 202.45 (silver) Artur Dmitriev Jr. (RUS) 197.09 (bronze) Ryuichi Kihara (JPN) 173.31
      - Standings (after 3 of 7 events): Farris, Jason Brown (USA), Ryuju Hino (JPN) 15 points, Dmitriev, Keiji Tanaka (JPN), Zhang He (CHN) 13.
    - Ice dancing: (gold) Victoria Sinitsina/Ruslan Zhiganshin (RUS) 140.31 (silver) Anastasia Galyeta/Alexei Shumski (UKR) 122.90 (bronze) Anna Yanovskaia/Sergey Mozgov (RUS) 121.72
      - Standings (after 3 of 7 events): Sinitsina/Zhiganshin, Nicole Orford/Thomas Williams (CAN), Maria Nosulia/Evgen Kholoniuk (UKR) 15 points, Lauri Bonacorsi/Travis Mager (USA), Galyeta/Shumski, Evgenia Kosigina/Nikolai Moroshkin (RUS) 13.

==== Football (soccer) ====
- UEFA Women's Euro 2013 qualifying Matchday 1:
  - Group 1: Bosnia and Herzegovina 0–1 Italy
  - Group 2:
    - Kazakhstan 0–3 Romania
    - Germany 4–1 Switzerland
    - Turkey 1–10 Spain
  - Group 3:
    - Belgium 2–1 Hungary
    - Iceland 3–1 Norway
      - Standings: Iceland 6 points (2 matches), Belgium 3 (1), Northern Ireland 0 (0), Hungary, Norway, Bulgaria 0 (1).
  - Group 4: Wales 0–2 Republic of Ireland
  - Group 6: Serbia 2–2 England
  - Group 7:
    - Armenia 0–8 Portugal
    - Austria 1–1 Czech Republic
- CAF Confederation Cup Group stage Matchday 6 (teams in **bold** advance to the semifinals):
  - Group B:
    - **Sunshine Stars** (Nigeria) 1–0 (Algeria) JS Kabylie
    - **Maghreb de Fès** (Morocco) 3–0 (Democratic Republic of the Congo) Motema Pembe
      - Final standings: Maghreb de Fès 14 points, Sunshine Stars 11, Motema Pembe 8, JS Kabylie 0.

==== Mixed martial arts ====
- UFC Fight Night: Shields vs. Ellenberger in New Orleans, Louisiana, United States:
  - Welterweight bout: **Jake Ellenberger** (USA) def. Jake Shields (USA) via TKO (strikes)
  - Middleweight bout: **Court McGee** (USA) def. Yang Dongi (KOR) via unanimous decision (30–27, 29–28, 30–28)
  - Featherweight bout: **Erik Koch** (USA) def. Jonathan Brookins (USA) via unanimous decision (30–27, 29–28, 30–27)
  - Middleweight bout: **Alan Belcher** (USA) def. Jason MacDonald (CAN) via submission (strikes)

==== Rugby league ====
- NRL Finals Series:
  - Semi-Final: **Brisbane Broncos** 13–12 St. George Illawarra Dragons
- Super League Play-offs:
  - Qualifying and Elimination Finals: **Catalans Dragons** 56–6 Hull Kingston Rovers

==== Rugby union ====
- World Cup in New Zealand:
  - Pool B in Invercargill: Argentina 43–8 Romania
    - Standings (after 2 matches unless stated): Scotland 9 points, Argentina 6, England 4 (1), Georgia 0 (1), Romania 0.
  - Pool C in Auckland: Australia 6–15 Ireland
    - Standings (after 2 matches unless stated): Ireland 8 points, Australia 5, United States 4, Russia 1 (1), Italy 0 (1).
  - Pool D in Wellington: South Africa 49–3 Fiji
    - Standings (after 2 matches unless stated): South Africa 9 points, Samoa 5 (1), Fiji 5, Wales 1 (1), Namibia 0.

==== Snooker ====
- Brazil Masters in Florianópolis, Brazil, quarter-finals:
  - Mark Selby (ENG) 3–4 **Peter Ebdon** (ENG)
  - Igor Figueiredo (BRA) 2–4 **Graeme Dott** (SCO)
  - **Shaun Murphy** (ENG) 4–1 Ricky Walden (ENG)
  - **Stephen Hendry** (SCO) 4–0 Ali Carter (ENG)

==== Tennis ====
- Davis Cup World Group Semifinals, day 2:
  - Serbia 1–2 Argentina
  - Spain 2–1 France
- Davis Cup World Group play-offs, day 2 (teams in **bold** will play in 2012 World Group):
  - Romania 0–3 **Czech Republic**
  - Russia 1–2 Brazil
  - Israel 1–2 Canada
  - South Africa 1–2 Croatia
  - Chile 0–3 **Italy**
  - Japan 2–1 India
  - Belgium 1–2 Austria
  - Australia 2–1 Switzerland
- WTA Tour:
  - Tashkent Open in Tashkent, Uzbekistan:
    - Final: **Ksenia Pervak** (RUS) def. Eva Birnerová (CZE) 6–3, 6–1
      - Pervak wins her first career title.

==== Volleyball ====
- Men's European Championship in Vienna, Austria:
  - Semifinals:
    - **Italy** 3–0 Poland
    - **Serbia** 3–2 Russia
      - Italy and Serbia both qualify for the World Cup.
- Women's NORCECA Championship in Caguas, Puerto Rico:
  - Bronze medal match: (bronze) **Cuba** 3–0 Puerto Rico
  - Final: (gold) **United States** 3–0 (silver) Dominican Republic
    - The United States win the title for the sixth time.
    - The United States and Dominican Republic both qualify for the World Cup.
- Women's Asian Championship in Taipei, Chinese Taipei (teams in **bold** advance to the quarterfinals):
  - Pool A: Indonesia 2–3 **Iran**
    - Final standings: **Chinese Taipei** 6 points, Iran 2, Indonesia 1.
  - Pool B: **Thailand** 3–0 Australia
    - Final standings: Thailand 6 points, **Vietnam** 3, Australia 0.
  - Pool C:
    - India 1–3 **North Korea**
    - Kazakhstan 0–3 **China**
      - Final standings: China 9 points, North Korea 6, Kazakhstan 3, India 0.
  - Pool D: **South Korea** 2–3 **Japan**
    - Final standings: Japan 5 points, South Korea 4, Sri Lanka 0.

==== Wrestling ====
- World Championships in Istanbul, Turkey:
  - Men's freestyle:
    - 60 kg: (gold) Besik Kudukhov (RUS) (silver) Franklin Gómez (PUR) (bronze) Kenichi Yumoto (JPN) & Dauren Zhumagaziyev (KAZ)
      - Kudukhov wins the title for the fourth time.
    - 84 kg: (gold) Sharif Sharifov (AZE) (silver) Ibragim Aldatov (UKR) (bronze) Dato Marsagishvili (GEO) & Albert Saritov (RUS)
    - 96 kg: (gold) Reza Yazdani (IRI) (silver) Serhat Balcı (TUR) (bronze) Ruslan Sheikhau (BLR) & Jake Varner (USA)

=== September 16, 2011 (Friday) ===
==== Athletics ====
- IAAF Diamond League:
  - Memorial Van Damme in Brussels, Belgium:
    - Men:
      - 100m: Usain Bolt (JAM) 9.76
      - 200m: Yohan Blake (JAM) 19.26
        - Blake records the second-fastest time ever.
        - Final Diamond Race standings: (1) Walter Dix (USA) 16 points (2) Blake 8 (3) Jaysuma Saidy Ndure (NOR) 5
      - 400m: Jonathan Borlée (BEL) 44.78
      - 400m hurdles: Javier Culson (PUR) 48.32
        - Final Diamond Race standings: (1) Dai Greene (GBR) 16 points (2) Culson 15 (3) Cornel Fredericks (RSA) 4
      - 800m: David Rudisha (KEN) 1:43.96
        - Final Diamond Race standings: (1) Rudisha 16 points (2) Asbel Kiprop (KEN) 8 (3) Alfred Kirwa Yego (KEN) 5
      - 5000m: Imane Merga (ETH) 12:58.32
        - Final Diamond Race standings: (1) Merga 15 points (2) Vincent Chepkok (KEN) 7 (3) Dejen Gebremeskel (ETH) 4
      - 10,000m: Kenenisa Bekele (ETH) 26:43.16
      - Javelin throw: Matthias de Zordo (GER) 88.36m
        - Final Diamond Race standings: (1) de Zordo 17 points (2) Andreas Thorkildsen (NOR) 14 (3) Vadims Vasiļevskis (LAT) 4
      - Pole vault: Konstadinos Filippidis (GRE) 5.72m
        - Final Diamond Race standings: (1) Renaud Lavillenie (FRA) 20 points (2) Malte Mohr (GER) 12 (3) Filippidis 10
      - Shot put: Reese Hoffa (USA) 22.09m
        - Final Diamond Race standings: (1) Dylan Armstrong (CAN) 17 points (2) Hoffa 16 (3) Christian Cantwell (USA) 11
      - Triple jump: Benjamin Compaoré (FRA) 17.31m
        - Final Diamond Race standings: (1) Phillips Idowu (GBR) 18 points (2) Alexis Copello (CUB) 9 (3) Compaoré 8
    - Women:
      - 100m: Carmelita Jeter (USA) 10.78
        - Final Diamond Race standings: (1) Jeter 22 points (2) Veronica Campbell-Brown (JAM) 10 (3) Kelly-Ann Baptiste (TRI) 8
      - 100m hurdles: Danielle Carruthers (USA) 12.65
        - Final Diamond Race standings: (1) Carruthers 19 points (2) Sally Pearson (AUS) & Kellie Wells (USA) 12
      - 400m: Amantle Montsho (BOT) 50.16
        - Final Diamond Race standings: (1) Montsho 28 points (2) Novlene Williams-Mills (JAM) 7 (3) Tatyana Firova (RUS) 2
      - 1500m: Morgan Uceny (USA) 4:00.06
        - Final Diamond Race standings: (1) Uceny 19 points (2) Maryam Yusuf Jamal (BHR) 11 (3) Anna Mishchenko (UKR) 6
      - 3000m steeplechase: Yuliya Zaripova (RUS) 9:15.43
        - Final Diamond Race standings: (1) Milcah Chemos Cheywa (KEN) 20 points (2) Sofia Assefa (ETH) 10 (3) Zaripova 8
      - Discus throw: Li Yanfeng (CHN) 66.27m
        - Final Diamond Race standings: (1) Yarelys Barrios (CUB) 14 points (2) Li 13 (3) Nadine Müller (GER) 11
      - High jump: Anna Chicherova (RUS) 2.05m
        - Final Diamond Race standings: (1) Blanka Vlašić (CRO) 18 points (2) Chicherova 14 (3) Yelena Slesarenko (RUS) 4
      - Triple jump: Olha Saladukha (UKR) 14.67m
        - Final Diamond Race standings: (1) Saladukha 24 points (2) Olga Rypakova (KAZ) 6 (3) Mabel Gay (CUB) 5

==== Australian rules football ====
- AFL Finals Series:
  - Second Semi-Final in Melbourne: **Hawthorn** 19.8 (122)–13.8 (86) Sydney

==== Baseball ====
- Major League Baseball news: The Detroit Tigers clinch their first American League Central title with a 3–1 win over the Oakland Athletics.

==== Basketball ====
- EuroBasket in Kaunas, Lithuania (teams in **bold** qualify for 2012 Olympics, teams in italics qualify for World Olympic Qualifying Tournament):
  - Semifinals:
    - **Spain** 92–80 North Macedonia
      - Spain reach the final for the third successive time.
    - **France** 79–71 Russia
      - France reach the final for the first time since 1949.
  - Classification 5–8: Greece 87–77 Serbia
- FIBA Asia Championship in Wuhan, China (teams in **bold** advance to the Second round):
  - Group A:
    - **Lebanon** 62–80 **South Korea**
    - India 67–71 **Malaysia**
      - Standings (after 2 games): South Korea 4 points, Lebanon, Malaysia 3, India 2.
  - Group B:
    - Uzbekistan 71–81 Chinese Taipei
    - Qatar 4–40 **Iran**
      - Qatar lose by default after being left with only one eligible player.
      - Standings (after 2 games): Iran 4 points, Chinese Taipei, Uzbekistan 3, Qatar 2.
  - Group C:
    - Indonesia 61–74 Syria
    - Jordan 87–92 **Japan**
      - Standings (after 2 games): Japan 4 points, Jordan, Syria 3, Indonesia 2.
  - Group D:
    - Philippines 60–75 **China**
    - United Arab Emirates 91–53 Bahrain
      - Standings (after 2 games): China 4 points, Philippines, United Arab Emirates 3, Bahrain 2.
- WNBA Playoffs:
  - Eastern Conference Semifinals (best-of-3 series):
    - Game 1 in Uncasville, Connecticut: Atlanta Dream 89, Connecticut Sun 84. Dream lead series 1–0.
  - Western Conference Semifinals (best-of-3 series):
    - Game 1 in Minneapolis: Minnesota Lynx 66, San Antonio Silver Stars 65. Lynx lead series 1–0.

==== Cricket ====
- Australia in Sri Lanka:
  - 3rd Test in Colombo, day 1: Australia 235/5 (81.2 overs); Sri Lanka.
- India in England:
  - 5th ODI in Cardiff: India 304/6 (50 overs; Virat Kohli 107); England 241/4 (32.2/34 overs). **England win by 6 wickets (D/L); win 5-match series 3–0.**
- Pakistan in Zimbabwe:
  - 1st T20 in Harare: Pakistan 198/4 (20 overs); Zimbabwe 113 (15.2 overs). **Pakistan win by 85 runs**.

==== Equestrianism ====
- European Show Jumping Championship in Madrid:
  - Team result: (gold) Germany (Marco Kutscher, Carsten-Otto Nagel, Janne Friederike Meyer, Ludger Beerbaum) (silver) France (Michel Robert, Pénélope Leprevost, Kevin Staut, Olivier Guillon) (bronze) Great Britain (Nick Skelton, Guy Williams, Ben Maher, John Whitaker)

==== Figure skating ====
- ISU Junior Grand Prix:
  - JGP Baltic Cup in Gdańsk, Poland:
    - Pairs: (gold) Britney Simpson/Matthew Blackmer (USA) 141.42 (silver) Katherine Bobak/Ian Beharry (CAN) 132.54 (bronze) Tatiana Tudvaseva/Sergei Lisiev (RUS) 129.35
      - Standings (after 2 of 4 events): Tudvaseva/Lisiev 18 points (2 events), Sui Wenjing/Han Cong (CHN), Simpson/Blackmer 15 (1), Yu Xiaoyu/Jin Yang (CHN), Bobak/Boharry 13 (1), Margaret Purdy/Michael Marinaro (CAN) 11 (1).
    - Ladies: (gold) Yulia Lipnitskaya (RUS) 172.51 (silver) Satoko Miyahara (JPN) 162.20 (bronze) Samantha Cesario (USA) 153.84
      - Standings (after 3 of 7 events): Lipnitskaia, Polina Shelepen (RUS), Courtney Hicks (USA) 15 points, Miyahara, Li Zijun (CHN), Risa Shoji (JPN) 13.

==== Football (soccer) ====
- CAF Champions League group stage Matchday 6 (teams in **bold** advance to the semifinals):
  - Group B:
    - MC Alger (Algeria) 3–1 (Morocco) **Wydad Casablanca**
    - Al-Ahly (Egypt) 1–1 (Tunisia) **Espérance ST**
      - Final standings: Espérance ST 10 points, Wydad Casablanca, Al-Ahly 7, MC Alger 5.

==== Rugby league ====
- NRL Finals Series:
  - Semi-Final: Wests Tigers 20–22 **New Zealand Warriors**
- Super League Play-offs:
  - Qualifying Play-off: **Warrington Wolves** 47–0 Huddersfield Giants

==== Rugby union ====
- World Cup in New Zealand:
  - Pool A in Hamilton: New Zealand 83–7 Japan
    - Standings (after 2 matches unless stated): New Zealand 10 points, France 5 (1), Canada 4 (1), Tonga 1, Japan 0.

==== Snooker ====
- Brazil Masters in Florianópolis, Brazil, last 16:
  - **Shaun Murphy** (ENG) 4–0 Sobradinho de Deus (BRA)
  - Martin Gould (ENG) 1–4 **Ricky Walden** (ENG)
  - **Stephen Hendry** (SCO) 4–1 Noel Rodrigues (BRA)
  - **Ali Carter** (ENG) 4–2 Steve Davis (ENG)

==== Tennis ====
- Davis Cup World Group Semifinals, day 1:
  - Serbia 0–2 Argentina
  - Spain 2–0 France
- Davis Cup World Group play-offs, day 1:
  - Romania 0–2 Czech Republic
  - Russia 1–1 Brazil
  - Israel 1–1 Canada
  - South Africa 1–1 Croatia
  - Chile 0–2 Italy
  - Japan 2–0 India
  - Belgium 1–1 Austria
  - Australia 1–1 Switzerland

==== Volleyball ====
- Women's NORCECA Championship in Caguas, Puerto Rico:
  - Semifinals:
    - Cuba 0–3 **United States**
    - Puerto Rico 0–3 **Dominican Republic**
      - The United States and Dominican Republic both qualify for the World Cup.
- Women's Asian Championship in Taipei, Chinese Taipei (teams in **bold** advance to the quarterfinals):
  - Pool A: Iran 0–3 **Chinese Taipei**
    - Standings: Chinese Taipei 6 points (2 matches), Iran, Indonesia 0 (1).
  - Pool B: Australia 1–3 Vietnam
    - Standings: Thailand 3 points (1 match), Vietnam 3 (2), Australia 0 (1).
  - Pool C:
    - North Korea 3–1 Kazakhstan
    - **China** 3–0 India
      - Standings (after 2 matches): China 6 points, Kazakhstan, North Korea 3, India 0.
  - Pool D: **Japan** 3–0 Sri Lanka
    - Standings: **South Korea**, Japan 3 points (1 match), Sri Lanka 0 (2).

==== Wrestling ====
- World Championships in Istanbul, Turkey:
  - Women's freestyle:
    - 67 kg: (gold) Xi Luozhuoma (CHN) (silver) Banzragchyn Oyunsuren (MGL) (bronze) Yoshiko Inoue (JPN) & Adeline Gray (USA)
    - 72 kg: (gold) Stanka Zlateva (BUL) (silver) Ekaterina Bukina (RUS) (bronze) Ali Bernard (USA) & Vasilisa Marzaliuk (BLR)
      - Zlateva wins the title for the fifth time.
  - Men's freestyle 55 kg: (gold) Viktor Lebedev (RUS) (silver) Radoslav Velikov (BUL) (bronze) Daulet Niyazbekov (KAZ) & Hassan Rahimi (IRI)
    - Lebedev wins the title for the second time.

=== September 15, 2011 (Thursday) ===
==== Basketball ====
- EuroBasket in Kaunas, Lithuania:
  - Quarterfinals:
    - **France** 64–56 Greece
    - **Russia** 77–67 Serbia
  - Classification 5–8: Slovenia 77–80 **Lithuania**
    - Lithuania qualifies for World Olympic Qualifying Tournament.
- FIBA Asia Championship in Wuhan, China:
  - Group A:
    - Malaysia 42–89 South Korea
    - Lebanon 71–68 India
  - Group B:
    - Chinese Taipei 37–49 Iran
    - Qatar 12–27 Uzbekistan
      - Qatar lose by default after being left with only one eligible player.
  - Group C:
    - Syria 58–71 Jordan
    - Japan 81–59 Indonesia
  - Group D:
    - Philippines 92–52 United Arab Emirates
    - Bahrain 49–101 China
- WNBA Playoffs:
  - Eastern Conference Semifinals (best-of-3 series):
    - Game 1 in Indianapolis: Indiana Fever 74, New York Liberty 72. Fever lead series 1–0.
  - Western Conference Semifinals (best-of-3 series):
    - Game 1 in Seattle: Seattle Storm 80, Phoenix Mercury 61. Storm lead series 1–0.

==== Cricket ====
- (England) (Wales) County Championship Division One, final round:
  - Durham 264 (83.4 overs) & 388 (96.1 overs); Worcestershire 288 (85.3 overs; Vikram Solanki 124) & 213 (48.4 overs). **Durham win by 151 runs.**
  - Warwickshire 493 (156.1 overs; Shivnarine Chanderpaul 171, Varun Chopra 109); Hampshire 324 (96 overs; Liam Dawson 152*) & 327/7 (f/o, 103 overs; Neil McKenzie 115*, Michael Carberry 111, Chris Metters 5/115). **Match drawn.**
  - Somerset 380 (125.4 overs; James Hildreth 186) & 310 (106.4 overs; Peter Trego 122); Lancashire 480 (126.2 overs; Murali Kartik 5/137) & 213/2 (29.1 overs). **Lancashire win by 8 wickets.**
    - Final standings: Lancashire 246 points, Warwickshire 235, Durham 232.
      - Lancashire win the title outright for the first time since 1934 and eighth time overall.

==== Football (soccer) ====
- UEFA Europa League group stage Matchday 1:
  - Group A:
    - PAOK (Greece) 0–0 (England) Tottenham Hotspur
    - Shamrock Rovers (Republic of Ireland) 0–3 (Russia) Rubin Kazan
  - Group B:
    - Hannover 96 (Germany) 0–0 (Belgium) Standard Liège
    - Copenhagen (Denmark) 1–0 (Ukraine) Vorskla Poltava
  - Group C:
    - Hapoel Tel Aviv (Israel) 0–1 (Romania) Rapid București
    - PSV Eindhoven (Netherlands) 1–0 (Poland) Legia Warsaw
  - Group D:
    - Zürich (Switzerland) 0–2 (Portugal) Sporting CP
    - Lazio (Italy) 2–2 (Romania) Vaslui
  - Group E:
    - Dynamo Kyiv (Ukraine) 1–1 (England) Stoke City
    - Beşiktaş (Turkey) 5–1 (Israel) Maccabi Tel Aviv
  - Group F:
    - Slovan Bratislava (Slovakia) 1–2 (Spain) Athletic Bilbao
    - Paris Saint-Germain (France) 3–1 (Austria) Red Bull Salzburg
  - Group G:
    - AZ (Netherlands) 4–1 (Sweden) Malmö FF
    - Austria Wien 1–2 (Ukraine) Metalist Kharkiv
  - Group H:
    - Club Brugge (Belgium) 2–0 (Slovenia) Maribor
    - Birmingham City (England) 1–3 (Portugal) Braga
  - Group I:
    - Udinese (Italy) 2–1 (France) Rennes
    - Atlético Madrid (Spain) 2–0 (Scotland) Celtic
  - Group J:
    - Maccabi Haifa (Israel) 1–0 (Cyprus) AEK Larnaca
    - Steaua București (Romania) 0–0 (Germany) Schalke 04
  - Group K:
    - Wisła Kraków (Poland) 1–3 (Denmark) Odense
    - Fulham (England) 1–1 (Netherlands) Twente
  - Group L:
    - Sturm Graz (Austria) 1–2 (Russia) Lokomotiv Moscow
    - Anderlecht (Belgium) 4–1 (Greece) AEK Athens
- Copa Sudamericana Second stage, first leg:
  - Santa Fe (Colombia) 1–1 (Colombia) Deportivo Cali
  - Olimpia (Paraguay) 2–1 (Ecuador) Emelec
- CONCACAF Champions League group stage Matchday 3:
  - Group A: Motagua (Honduras) 2–4 (Costa Rica) Alajuelense
    - Standings (after 3 matches): (Mexico) Morelia, (United States) Los Angeles Galaxy, Alajuelense 6 points, Motagua 0.

==== Rugby union ====
- World Cup in New Zealand:
  - Pool C in New Plymouth: Russia 6–13 United States
    - Standings (after 1 match unless stated): Australia 5 points, Ireland 4, United States 4 (2), Russia 1, Italy 0.

==== Snooker ====
- Brazil Masters in Florianópolis, Brazil, last 16:
  - **Mark Selby** (ENG) 4–3 Stuart Bingham (ENG)
  - **Peter Ebdon** (ENG) 4–1 Stephen Lee (ENG)
  - Jamie Cope (ENG) 2–4 **Igor Figueiredo** (BRA)
  - **Graeme Dott** (SCO) 4–1 Mark Davis (ENG)

==== Volleyball ====
- Men's European Championship in Austria and Czech Republic:
  - Quarterfinals in Vienna, Austria:
    - **Italy** 3–1 Finland
    - **Serbia** 3–1 France
  - Quarterfinals in Karlovy Vary, Czech Republic:
    - Slovakia 0–3 **Poland**
    - **Russia** 3–1 Bulgaria
- Women's NORCECA Championship in Caguas, Puerto Rico:
  - Quarterfinals:
    - **United States** 3–0 Mexico
    - **Dominican Republic** 3–0 Canada
- Women's Asian Championship in Taipei, Chinese Taipei:
  - Pool A: Chinese Taipei 3–0 Indonesia
  - Pool B: Vietnam 0–3 Thailand
  - Pool C:
    - Kazakhstan 3–1 India
    - North Korea 0–3 China
  - Pool D: Sri Lanka 0–3 South Korea

==== Wrestling ====
- World Championships in Istanbul, Turkey:
  - Women's freestyle:
    - 55 kg: (gold) Saori Yoshida (JPN) (silver) Tonya Verbeek (CAN) (bronze) Tetyana Lazareva (UKR) & Ida-Theres Karlsson-Nerell (SWE)
      - Yoshida wins the title for the ninth time.
    - 59 kg: (gold) Ganna Vasylenko (UKR) (silver) Sofia Mattsson (SWE) (bronze) Takako Saito (JPN) & Sona Ahmadli (AZE)
    - 63 kg: (gold) Kaori Icho (JPN) (silver) Marianna Sastin (HUN) (bronze) Ochirbatyn Nasanburmaa (MGL) & Jing Ruixue (CHN)
      - Icho wins the title for the seventh time.

=== September 14, 2011 (Wednesday) ===
==== Baseball ====
- Major League Baseball news: The Philadelphia Phillies become the first team to clinch a playoff berth with their 1–0 win over the Houston Astros.

==== Basketball ====
- EuroBasket in Kaunas, Lithuania:
  - Quarterfinals:
    - **Spain** 86–64 Slovenia
    - **North Macedonia** 67–65 Lithuania

==== Cricket ====
- Pakistan in Zimbabwe:
  - 3rd ODI in Harare: Pakistan 270/5 (50 overs); Zimbabwe 242/9 (50 overs). **Pakistan win by 28 runs; win 3-match series 3–0.**
- ICC Intercontinental Cup:
  - In Rathmines, day 2: Ireland 462 (104.5 overs); Canada 194 (44 overs, Albert van der Merwe 5/70) & 257 (f/o, 49 overs). **Ireland win by an innings and 11 runs.**
    - Standings (after 2 matches unless stated): Ireland 40 points, Afghanistan 20 (1), Netherlands 17, Kenya 16, United Arab Emirates 14 (1), Scotland 7 (1), Namibia 0 (1), Canada 0.

==== Football (soccer) ====
- UEFA Women's Euro 2013 qualifying:
  - Group 4: Israel 0–5 France
- Superclásico de las Américas first leg in Córdoba, Argentina: Argentina 0–0 Brazil
- UEFA Champions League group stage Matchday 1:
  - Group A:
    - Manchester City (England) 1–1 (Italy) Napoli
    - Villarreal (Spain) 0–2 (Germany) Bayern Munich
  - Group B:
    - Lille (France) 2–2 (Russia) CSKA Moscow
    - Internazionale (Italy) 0–1 (Turkey) Trabzonspor
  - Group C:
    - Basel (Switzerland) 2–1 (Romania) Oțelul Galați
    - Benfica (Portugal) 1–1 (England) Manchester United
  - Group D:
    - Dinamo Zagreb (Croatia) 0–1 (Spain) Real Madrid
    - Ajax (Netherlands) 0–0 (France) Lyon
- Copa Sudamericana Second stage, second leg (first leg score in parentheses):
  - **Universitario** (Peru) 2–0 (2–1) (Venezuela) Deportivo Anzoátegui. Universitario win 6–0 on points.
  - Deportes Iquique (Chile) 0–0 (1–2) (Chile) **Universidad Católica**. Universidad Católica win 4–1 on points.
- AFC Champions League Quarter-finals first leg:
  - Cerezo Osaka (Japan) 4–3 (South Korea) Jeonbuk Hyundai Motors
  - Suwon Samsung Bluewings (South Korea) 1–1 (Iran) Zob Ahan
  - Sepahan (Iran) 1–0 (Qatar) Al-Sadd
  - Al-Ittihad (Saudi Arabia) 3–1 (South Korea) FC Seoul
- CONCACAF Champions League group stage Matchday 3:
  - Group C:
    - FC Dallas (United States) 1–1 (Panama) Tauro
    - UNAM (Mexico) 4–0 (Canada) Toronto FC
      - Standings (after 3 matches): FC Dallas 7 points, UNAM 4, Toronto FC 3, Tauro 2.
  - Group D:
    - Herediano (Costa Rica) 1–2 (United States) Seattle Sounders FC
    - Comunicaciones (Guatemala) 1–0 (Mexico) Monterrey
      - Standings (after 3 matches): Seattle Sounders 9 points, Comunicaciones 6, Monterrey 3, Herediano 0.

==== Modern pentathlon ====
- World Championships in Moscow, Russia:
  - Men's Relay: (gold) Hungary (Róbert Kasza, Ádám Marosi, Péter Tibolya) 6536 points (silver) South Korea (Choon-Huan Lee, Jin-Woo Hong, Woojin Hwang) 6492 (bronze) Ukraine (Pavlo Kirpulyanskyy, Pavlo Tymoshchenko, Oleksandr Mordasov) 6456

==== Rugby union ====
- World Cup in New Zealand:
  - Pool A in Whangarei: Tonga 20–25 Canada
    - Standings (after 1 match unless stated): New Zealand, France 5 points, Canada 4, Tonga 1 (2), Japan 0 (1).
  - Pool B in Invercargill: Scotland 15–6 Georgia
    - Standings (after 1 match unless stated): Scotland 9 points (2 matches), England 4, Argentina 1, Georgia, Romania 0.
  - Pool D in Rotorua: Samoa 49–12 Namibia
    - Standings (after 1 match unless stated): Samoa, Fiji 5 points, South Africa 4, Wales 1, Namibia 0 (2).

==== Volleyball ====
- Men's European Championship in Austria and Czech Republic:
  - Playoffs in Vienna, Austria:
    - **France** 3–1 Turkey
    - Slovenia 2–3 **Finland**
  - Playoffs in Karlovy Vary, Czech Republic:
    - **Bulgaria** 3–0 Estonia
    - Czech Republic 1–3 **Poland**
- Women's NORCECA Championship in Caguas, Puerto Rico (teams in **bold** advance to the semifinals, teams in italics advance to the quarterfinals):
  - Pool A: Mexico 0–3 **Puerto Rico**
    - Final standings: Puerto Rico 12 points, Mexico 6, Costa Rica 3.
  - Pool B: Trinidad and Tobago 0–3 United States
    - Final standings: United States 12 points, Canada 6, Trinidad and Tobago 3.
  - Pool C: **Cuba** 3–0 Dominican Republic
    - Final standings: Cuba 12 points, Dominican Republic 7, Panama 2.

==== Wrestling ====
- World Championships in Istanbul, Turkey:
  - Men's Greco-Roman 74 kg: (gold) Roman Vlasov (RUS) (silver) Selçuk Çebi (TUR) (bronze) Neven Žugaj (CRO) & Arsen Julfalakyan (ARM)
  - Women's freestyle:
    - 48 kg: (gold) Hitomi Sakamoto (JPN) (silver) Mariya Stadnik (AZE) (bronze) Zhao Shasha (CHN) & Zhuldyz Eshimova (KAZ)
      - Sakamoto wins her eighth world title.
    - 51 kg: (gold) Zamira Rakhmanova (RUS) (silver) Davaasukh Otgontsetseg (MGL) (bronze) Patimat Bagomedova (AZE) & Jessica MacDonald (CAN)

=== September 13, 2011 (Tuesday) ===
==== Cricket ====
- ICC Intercontinental Cup:
  - In Rathmines, day 1: Ireland 435/7 (96 overs; Paul Stirling 107); Canada.
- ICC Intercontinental Cup One-Day:
  - 6th ODI in Voorburg: Kenya 184/8 (50 overs); Netherlands 187/6 (45 overs). **Netherlands win by 4 wickets.**
    - Standings (after 2 matches unless stated): Ireland, Afghanistan, Scotland 4 points, Netherlands 4 (4), Kenya 2 (4), United Arab Emirates 2, Canada, Namibia 0.

==== Football (soccer) ====
- UEFA Champions League group stage Matchday 1:
  - Group E:
    - Chelsea (England) 2–0 (Germany) Bayer Leverkusen
    - Genk (Belgium) 0–0 (Spain) Valencia
  - Group F:
    - Olympiacos (Greece) 0–1 (France) Marseille
    - Borussia Dortmund (Germany) 1–1 (England) Arsenal
  - Group G:
    - Porto (Portugal) 2–1 (Ukraine) Shakhtar Donetsk
    - APOEL (Cyprus) 2–1 (Russia) Zenit St. Petersburg
  - Group H:
    - Barcelona (Spain) 2–2 (Italy) Milan
    - Viktoria Plzeň (Czech Republic) 1–1 (Belarus) BATE Borisov
- Copa Sudamericana Second stage first leg:
  - Universidad de Chile 1–0 (Uruguay) Nacional
  - La Equidad (Colombia) 0–1 (Paraguay) Libertad
  - LDU Quito (Ecuador) 4–1 (Venezuela) Trujillanos
- AFC Cup quarter-finals first leg:
  - Persipura Jayapura (Indonesia) 1–2 (Iraq) Arbil
  - Chonburi (Thailand) 0–1 (Uzbekistan) Nasaf Qarshi
  - Al-Kuwait 1–0 (Thailand) Muangthong United
  - Al-Wehdat (Jordan) 5–1 (Iraq) Duhok
- CONCACAF Champions League group stage Matchday 3:
  - Group A: Morelia (Mexico) 2–1 (United States) Los Angeles Galaxy
    - Standings: Morelia, Los Angeles Galaxy 6 points (3 matches), (Costa Rica) Alajuelense 3 (2), (Honduras) Motagua 0 (2).
  - Group B:
    - Real España (Honduras) 1–2 (El Salvador) Isidro Metapán
    - Colorado Rapids (United States) 1–4 (Mexico) Santos Laguna
      - Standings (after 3 matches): Santos Laguna, Isidro Metapán 6 points, Colorado Rapids 4, Real España 1.

==== Modern pentathlon ====
- World Championships in Moscow, Russia:
  - Women's Relay: (gold) Hungary (Adrienn Tóth, Sarolta Kovács, Leila Gyenesei) 5726 points (silver) Germany (Lena Schöneborn, Eva Trautmann, Annika Schleu) 5620 (bronze) Ukraine (Victoria Tereshuk, Ganna Buriak, Nataliia Levchenko) 5576

==== Volleyball ====
- Women's NORCECA Championship in Caguas, Puerto Rico:
  - Pool A: Costa Rica 1–3 Mexico
    - Standings: Puerto Rico 6 points (1 match), Mexico 5 (1), Costa Rica 3 (2).
  - Pool B: United States 3–0 Canada
    - Standings: United States 6 points (1 match), Canada 6 (2), Trinidad and Tobago 2 (1).
  - Pool C: Panama 0–3 Cuba
    - Standings: Cuba, Dominican Republic 6 points (1 match), Panama 2 (2).

==== Wrestling ====
- World Championships in Istanbul, Turkey:
  - Men's Greco-Roman:
    - 60 kg: (gold) Omid Norouzi (IRI) (silver) Almat Kebispayev (KAZ) (bronze) Zaur Kuramagomedov (RUS) & Ivo Angelov (BUL)
    - 84 kg: (gold) Alim Selimau (BLR) (silver) Damian Janikowski (POL) (bronze) Nazmi Avluca (TUR) & Rami Hietaniemi (FIN)
    - 120 kg: (gold) Rıza Kayaalp (TUR) (silver) Mijaín López (CUB) (bronze) Nurmakhan Tinaliyev (KAZ) & Bashir Babajanzadeh (IRI)

=== September 12, 2011 (Monday) ===
==== American football ====
- NFL Monday Night Football, Week 1:
  - New England Patriots 38, Miami Dolphins 24
    - The two teams set an NFL record with 933 combined passing yards, with the Patriots' Tom Brady becoming the 11th quarterback to throw for 500 yards in a game, and the Dolphins' Chad Henne also throwing for over 400.
  - Oakland Raiders 23, Denver Broncos 20
    - As time expires in the first half, Raiders kicker Sebastian Janikowski kicks a 63-yard field goal, equaling the NFL record.

==== Basketball ====
- EuroBasket in Lithuania (teams in **bold** advance to the quarterfinals):
  - Group F in Vilnius:
    - **Slovenia** 67–60 Finland
    - **Greece** 73–60 Georgia
    - **Russia** 63–61 **North Macedonia**
      - Final standings: Russia 10 points, Macedonia 9, Greece 8, Slovenia 7, Finland 6, Georgia 5.

==== Cricket ====
- Australia in Sri Lanka:
  - 2nd Test in Pallekele, day 5: Sri Lanka 174 & 317/6 (114.3 overs); Australia 411/7d. **Match drawn; Australia lead 3-match series 1–0.**
- ICC Intercontinental Cup One-Day:
  - 5th ODI in Voorburg: Kenya 208/8 (50 overs); Netherlands 198/8 (42/43 overs). **Netherlands win by 2 wickets (D/L)**.
    - Standings (after 2 matches unless stated): Ireland, Afghanistan, Scotland 4 points, Kenya, Netherlands 2 (3), United Arab Emirates 2, Canada, Namibia 0.

==== Modern pentathlon ====
- World Championships in Moscow, Russia:
  - Mixed Relay: (gold) Ukraine (Victoria Tereshuk/Dmytro Kirpulyansky) (silver) Russia (Evdokia Gretchichnikova/Serguei Karyakin) (bronze) Lithuania (Justinas Kinderis/Laura Asadauskaitė)
    - Tereshuk wins her second title of the championships.

==== Tennis ====
- Grand Slams:
  - US Open in New York City, United States, day 15:
    - Men's Singles Final: **Novak Djokovic** (SRB) [1] def. Rafael Nadal (ESP) [2] 6–2, 6–4, 6–7(3), 6–1
      - Djokovic wins his third Grand Slam of the year and fourth overall. This is also Djokovic's 10th title of the year and 28th of his career.

==== Volleyball ====
- Men's European Championship in Austria and Czech Republic (teams in **bold** advance to the quarterfinals, teams in italics advance to the playoffs):
  - Pool A in Vienna, Austria:
    - Turkey 2–3 Slovenia
    - Austria 0–3 **Serbia**
      - Final standings: Serbia 9 points, Slovenia 5, Turkey 4, Austria 0.
  - Pool B in Karlovy Vary, Czech Republic:
    - Estonia 3–0 Portugal
    - Czech Republic 0–3 **Russia**
      - Final standings: Russia 9 points, Czech Republic 5, Estonia 3, Portugal 1.
  - Pool C in Innsbruck, Austria:
    - Finland 3–0 Belgium
    - **Italy** 2–3 France
      - Final standings: Italy 7 points, France 5, Finland, Belgium 3.
  - Pool D in Prague, Czech Republic:
    - Bulgaria 3–1 Germany
    - Poland 1–3 **Slovakia**
      - Final standings: Slovakia 8 points, Bulgaria 7, Poland 3, Germany 0.
- Women's NORCECA Championship in Caguas, Puerto Rico:
  - Pool A: Puerto Rico 3–0 Costa Rica
  - Pool B: Canada 3–1 Trinidad and Tobago
  - Pool C: Dominican Republic 3–0 Panama

==== Wrestling ====
- World Championships in Istanbul, Turkey:
  - Men's Greco-Roman:
    - 55 kg: (gold) Rovshan Bayramov (AZE) (silver) Elbek Tazhyieu (BLR) (bronze) Li Shujin (CHN) & Bekkhan Mankiev (RUS)
    - 66 kg: (gold) Saeid Abdevali (IRI) (silver) Manuchar Tskhadaia (GEO) (bronze) Kim Hyeon-Woo (KOR) & Pedro Isaac (CUB)
    - 96 kg: (gold) Elis Guri (BUL) (silver) Jimmy Lidberg (SWE) (bronze) Rustam Totrov (RUS) & Cenk İldem (TUR)

=== September 11, 2011 (Sunday) ===
==== American football ====
- NFL Week 1:
  - Houston Texans 34, Indianapolis Colts 7
  - Baltimore Ravens 35, Pittsburgh Steelers 7
  - Buffalo Bills 41, Kansas City Chiefs 7
  - Jacksonville Jaguars 16, Tennessee Titans 14
  - Chicago Bears 30, Atlanta Falcons 12
  - Philadelphia Eagles 31, St. Louis Rams 13
  - Detroit Lions 27, Tampa Bay Buccaneers 20
  - Cincinnati Bengals 27, Cleveland Browns 17
  - San Diego Chargers 24, Minnesota Vikings 17
  - Washington Redskins 28, New York Giants 14
  - Arizona Cardinals 28, Carolina Panthers 21
    - Panthers quarterback Cam Newton ties Matthew Stafford's single-game rookie record of 422 passing yards in his first NFL game.
  - San Francisco 49ers 33, Seattle Seahawks 17
  - Sunday Night Football: New York Jets 27, Dallas Cowboys 24

==== Australian rules football ====
- AFL Finals Series:
  - First Elimination Final in Melbourne: **Carlton** 21.23 (149)–13.9 (87) Essendon

==== Auto racing ====
- Formula One:
  - Italian Grand Prix in Monza, Italy: (1) Sebastian Vettel (GER) (Red Bull-Renault) (2) Jenson Button (GBR) (McLaren-Mercedes) (3) Fernando Alonso (ESP) (Ferrari)
    - Drivers' championship standings (after 13 of 19 races): (1) Vettel 284 points (2) Alonso 172 (3) Button & Mark Webber (AUS) (Red Bull-Renault) 167
- World Rally Championship:
  - Rally Australia in Coffs Harbour, Australia: (1) Mikko Hirvonen (FIN)/Jarmo Lehtinen (FIN) (Ford Fiesta RS WRC) (2) Jari-Matti Latvala (FIN)/Miikka Anttila (FIN) (Ford Fiesta RS WRC) (3) Petter Solberg (NOR)/Chris Patterson (GBR) (Citroën DS3 WRC)
    - Drivers' championship standings (after 10 of 13 rallies): (1) Sébastien Loeb (FRA) (Citroën DS3 WRC) 196 points (2) Hirvonen 181 (3) Sébastien Ogier (FRA) (Citroën DS3 WRC) 167

==== Basketball ====
- EuroBasket in Lithuania (teams in **bold** advance to the quarterfinals):
  - Group E in Vilnius:
    - **Serbia** 68–67 Turkey
    - **France** 69–96 **Spain**
    - **Lithuania** 84–75 Germany
      - Final standings: Spain, France 9 points, Lithuania 8, Serbia 7, Germany, Turkey 6.
- FIBA Americas Championship in Mar del Plata, Argentina:
  - Bronze medal game: (bronze) **Dominican Republic** 103–89 Puerto Rico
  - Final: (silver) Brazil 75–80 (gold) **Argentina**
    - Argentina win the title for the second time.
- FIBA Oceania Championship:
  - Game 3 in Sydney: Australia 92–68 New Zealand. **Australia win 3-game series 3–0.**
    - Australia win the title for the 17th time.
- FIBA Oceania Championship for Women:
  - Game 3 in Sydney: Australia 82–57 New Zealand. **Australia win 3-game series 3–0.**
    - Australia win the title for the eighth successive time, and 13th time overall.

==== Canoeing ====
- Slalom World Championships in Bratislava, Slovakia:
  - Men:
    - Individual single kayak (K1M): (gold) Peter Kauzer (SLO) 96.01 (silver) Mateusz Polaczyk (POL) 97.22 (bronze) Fabien Lefèvre (FRA) 98.89
      - Kauzer wins the event for the second time.
    - Individual single canoe (C1M): (gold) Denis Gargaud Chanut (FRA) 101.14 (silver) Nico Bettge (GER) 103.83 (bronze) Matej Beňuš (SLO) 103.91
    - Team double canoe (C2M): (gold) France 127.27 (silver) Slovakia 127.94 (bronze) Great Britain 129.51
    - Team single kayak (K1M): (gold) Germany 110.79 (silver) France 111.83 (bronze) Italy 112.44
    - Team single canoe (C1M): (gold) Slovakia 109.97 (silver) Germany 114.95 (bronze) Czech Republic 115.74
  - Women:
    - Individual single Canoe (C1W): (gold) Kateřina Hošková (CZE) 138.58 (silver) Cen Nanqin (CHN) 140.13 (bronze) Katarína Macová (SVK) 140.24
    - Team single kayak (K1W): (gold) Slovakia 131.90 (silver) Czech Republic 132.25 (bronze) Germany 134.77
    - Team single canoe (C1W): (gold) Australia 179.44 (silver) China 194.69 (bronze) Germany 230.51

==== Cricket ====
- Australia in Sri Lanka:
  - 2nd Test in Pallekele, day 4: Sri Lanka 174 & 223/2 (79 overs); Australia 411/7d. Sri Lanka trail by 14 runs with 8 wickets remaining.
- India in England:
  - 4th ODI in London: India 280/5 (50 overs); England 270/8 (48.5 overs). **Match tied (D/L); England lead 5-match series 2–0.**
- Pakistan in Zimbabwe:
  - 2nd ODI in Harare: Zimbabwe 225/6 (50 overs); Pakistan 228/0 (42.1 overs; Mohammad Hafeez 139*). **Pakistan win by 10 wickets; lead 3-match series 2–0.**

==== Cycling ====
- Grand Tours:
  - Vuelta a España, Stage 21: (gold) Peter Sagan (SVK) (Liquigas–Cannondale) 2h 20' 59" (silver) Daniele Bennati (ITA) (Leopard Trek) s.t. (bronze) Alessandro Petacchi (ITA) (Lampre–ISD) s.t.
    - Final general classification: (1) Juan José Cobo (ESP) (Geox–TMC) 84h 59' 31" (2) Chris Froome (GBR) (Team Sky) + 13" (3) Bradley Wiggins (GBR) (Team Sky) + 1' 39"
- UCI World Tour:
  - GP de Montréal: (gold) Rui Costa (POR) (Movistar Team) 5h 20' 18" (silver) Pierrick Fédrigo (FRA) (FDJ) s.t. (bronze) Philippe Gilbert (BEL) (Omega Pharma–Lotto) + 2"
    - UCI World Tour standings (after 25 of 27 races): (1) Gilbert 698 points (2) Cadel Evans (AUS) (BMC Racing Team) 574 (3) Alberto Contador (ESP) (Saxo Bank–SunGard) 471

==== Equestrianism ====
- Show jumping:
  - Spruce Meadows Masters in Calgary (CSIO 5*):
    - CN International Grand Prix: (gold) Eric Lamaze (CAN) on Hickstead (silver) Niels Bruynseels (BEL) on Nasa (bronze) Martin Fuchs (SUI) on Principal 12
  - HITS-on-the-Hudson Horse Show in Saugerties, New York:
    - Pfizer $1m Grand Prix: (gold) Andre Thieme (GER) on Aragon Rouet (silver) Duncan McFarlane (NZL) on Mr Whoopy (bronze) McLain Ward (USA) on Antares F

==== Field hockey ====
- African Olympic Qualifier in Bulawayo, Zimbabwe:
  - Men's Final: **South Africa** 1–0 Egypt
  - Women's Final: **South Africa** 5–0 Kenya
    - South Africa qualify both men and women teams for 2012 Olympics.

==== Football (soccer) ====
- 2012 Olympics Women's Asian Qualifiers Final Round in Jinan, China (teams in **bold** qualify for 2012 Olympics):
  - Thailand 0–5 **North Korea**
  - South Korea 1–2 Australia
  - **Japan** 1–0 China
    - Final standings: Japan 13 points, North Korea 11, Australia 9, China PR 5, South Korea 4, Thailand 0.
- 2012 CAF Women's Pre-Olympic Tournament Final Round second leg (first leg score in parentheses): Ethiopia 1–1 (0–3) **South Africa**. South Africa win 4–1 on aggregate, and qualify for 2012 Olympics.
- FIFA Beach Soccer World Cup in Ravenna, Italy:
  - Bronze medal match: El Salvador 2–3 (bronze) **Portugal**
  - Final: (gold) **Russia** 12–8 (silver) Brazil
    - Russia win the title for the first time.
- CAF Champions League Group stage Matchday 5:
  - Group B: Wydad Casablanca (Morocco) 1–1 (Egypt) Al-Ahly
    - Standings (after 5 matches): (Tunisia) Espérance ST 9 points, Wydad Casablanca 7, Al-Ahly 6, (Algeria) MC Alger 2.
- CAF Confederation Cup Group stage Matchday 5 (team in **bold** advances to the semifinals):
  - Group A:
    - **Inter Luanda** (Angola) 4–1 (Nigeria) Kaduna United
    - Club Africain (Tunisia) 1–0 (Ivory Coast) ASEC Mimosas
      - Standings (after 5 matches): Inter Luanda 10 points, Club Africain 8, Kaduna United 5, ASEC Mimosas 4.
  - Group B: Motema Pembe (Democratic Republic of the Congo) 0–0 (Nigeria) Sunshine Stars
    - Standings (after 5 matches): (Morocco) Maghreb de Fès 11 points, Motema Pembe, Sunshine Stars 8, (Algeria) JS Kabylie 0.

==== Golf ====
- European Tour:
  - KLM Open in Hilversum, Netherlands:
    - Winner: Simon Dyson (ENG) 268 (−12)
      - Dyson wins the title for the third time, for his sixth European Tour title.
- LPGA Tour:
  - Walmart NW Arkansas Championship in Rogers, Arkansas:
    - Winner: Yani Tseng (TWN) 201 (−12)^{PO}
      - Tseng defeats Amy Yang (KOR) on the first playoff hole, to win her fifth LPGA Tour title of the year and tenth of her career.
- Amateur events:
  - Walker Cup in Aberdeen, Scotland: **Great Britain & Ireland** (United Kingdom) (Republic of Ireland) 14–12 United States
    - Great Britain & Ireland win the Cup for the first time since 2003, and eighth time overall.

==== Modern pentathlon ====
- World Championships in Moscow, Russia:
  - Men's Individual: (gold) Andrey Moiseyev (RUS) 5964 points (silver) Aleksander Lesun (RUS) 5944 (bronze) Ádám Marosi (HUN) 5924
  - Men's team: (gold) Russia (Lesun, Ilia Frolov, Serguei Karyakin) 17,588 points (silver) Hungary (Marosi, Róbert Kasza, Bence Demeter) 17,560 (bronze) Italy (Riccardo De Luca, Auro Franceschini, Nicola Benedetti) 16,956

==== Open water swimming ====
- European Championships in Eilat, Israel:
  - Women's 25 km: (gold) Alice Franco (ITA) 5:26:23.6 (silver) Margarita Dominguez (ESP) 5:26:42.7 (bronze) Jana Pechanová (CZE) 5:26:44.2
  - Men's 25 km: (gold) Brian Ryckeman (BEL) 5:05:02.2 (silver) Petar Stoychev (BUL) 5:05:06.6 (bronze) Joanes Hedel (FRA) 5:05:18.3

==== Rugby league ====
- NRL Finals Series:
  - Qualifying Final: **Melbourne Storm** 18–8 Newcastle Knights

==== Rugby union ====
- World Cup in New Zealand:
  - Pool C:
    - In Auckland: Australia 32–6 Italy
    - In New Plymouth: Ireland 22–10 United States
  - Pool D in Wellington: South Africa 17–16 Wales

==== Snooker ====
- Shanghai Masters in Shanghai, China:
  - Final: **Mark Selby** (ENG) 10–9 Mark Williams (WAL)
    - Selby wins his second ranking title, and seventh professional title.

==== Tennis ====
- Grand Slams:
  - US Open in New York City, United States, day 14:
    - Women's Singles Final: **Samantha Stosur** (AUS) [9] def. Serena Williams (USA) [28] 6–2, 6–3
      - Stosur, in winning her third career singles title, becomes the first Australian woman to win a Grand Slam singles event since Evonne Goolagong won Wimbledon in 1980.
    - Women's Doubles Final: **Liezel Huber** (USA)/**Lisa Raymond** (USA) [4] def. Vania King (USA)/Yaroslava Shvedova (KAZ) [3] 4–6, 7–6(5), 7–6(3)
      - Huber and Raymond win their first Grand Slam title as a team. Huber wins her second US Open and fifth Grand Slam overall. Raymond wins her third US Open and sixth Grand Slam title overall.

==== Triathlon ====
- ITU World Championships:
  - Grand Final in Beijing, China:
    - Women: (gold) Andrea Hewitt (NZL) 1:58:27 (silver) Helen Jenkins (GBR) 1:58:38 (bronze) Melanie Annaheim (SUI) 1:58:58
      - Final standings: (1) Jenkins 4032 points (2) Hewitt 3836 (3) Sarah Groff (USA) 2783
      - Jenkins wins the title for the second time.

==== Volleyball ====
- Men's European Championship in Austria and Czech Republic:
  - Pool A in Vienna, Austria:
    - Slovenia 1–3 Serbia
    - Austria 0–3 Turkey
      - Standings (after 2 matches): Serbia 6 points, Slovenia, Turkey 3, Austria 0.
  - Pool B in Karlovy Vary, Czech Republic:
    - Portugal 1–3 Russia
    - Czech Republic 3–0 Estonia
      - Standings (after 2 matches): Russia 6 points, Czech Republic 5, Portugal 1, Estonia 0.
  - Pool C in Innsbruck, Austria:
    - Belgium 3–1 France
    - Italy 3–0 Finland
      - Standings (after 2 matches): Italy 6 points, France, Belgium 3, Finland 0.
  - Pool D in Prague, Czech Republic:
    - Germany 1–3 Slovakia
    - Poland 1–3 Bulgaria
      - Standings (after 2 matches): Slovakia 5 points, Bulgaria 4, Poland 3, Germany 0.

=== September 10, 2011 (Saturday) ===
==== American football ====
- NCAA AP Top 10:
  - (2) LSU 49, Northwestern State 3
  - (3) Alabama 27, (23) Penn State 11
  - (5) Florida State 62, Charleston Southern 10
  - (6) Stanford 44, Duke 14
  - (8) Wisconsin 35, Oregon State 0
  - (10) Nebraska 42, Fresno State 29
  - Idle: (1) Oklahoma, (4) Boise State, (7) Texas A&M
- Other games: Auburn 41, (16) Mississippi State 34

==== Australian rules football ====
- AFL Finals Series:
  - First Qualifying Final in Melbourne: **Collingwood** 12.10 (82)–9.8 (62) West Coast
  - Second Elimination Final in Melbourne: St Kilda 8.9 (57)–12.10 (82) **Sydney**

==== Auto racing ====
- Sprint Cup Series:
  - Wonderful Pistachios 400 in Richmond, Virginia: (1) (California) Kevin Harvick (Chevrolet; Richard Childress Racing) (2) (Missouri) Carl Edwards (Ford; Roush Fenway Racing) (3) (California) Jeff Gordon (Chevrolet; Hendrick Motorsports)
    - Drivers qualifying for the Chase for the Sprint Cup (points through 26 races, followed by points entering the Chase in parentheses): (Nevada) Kyle Busch (Toyota; Joe Gibbs Racing) 2012 points (891), Harvick 2012 (867), Gordon 2009 (872), (Wisconsin) Matt Kenseth (Ford, Roush Fenway Racing) 2006 (856), Edwards 2003 (878), (California) Jimmie Johnson (Chevrolet; Hendrick Motorsports) 2003 (887), (Nevada) Kurt Busch (Dodge; Penske Racing) 2003 (839), (Indiana) Ryan Newman (Chevrolet; Stewart Haas Racing) 2003 (822), (Indiana) Tony Stewart (Chevrolet; Stewart Haas Racing) 2000 (788), (North Carolina) Dale Earnhardt Jr. (Chevrolet; Hendrick Motorsports) 2000 (781), (Michigan) Brad Keselowski (Dodge; Penske Racing) 2000 (760) (wild card), (Virginia) Denny Hamlin (Toyota; Joe Gibbs Racing) 2000 (744) (wild card).

==== Basketball ====
- EuroBasket in Lithuania (teams in **bold** advance to the quarterfinals):
  - Group F in Vilnius:
    - Georgia 73–87 Finland
    - **North Macedonia** 68–59 Slovenia
    - **Greece** 67–83 **Russia**
      - Standings (after 4 games): Russia, Macedonia 8 points, Greece 6, Slovenia, Finland 5, Georgia 4.
- FIBA Americas Championship in Mar del Plata, Argentina:
  - Semifinals:
    - **Brazil** 83–76 Dominican Republic
    - **Argentina** 81–79 Puerto Rico
      - Brazil and Argentina qualify for 2012 Olympics.
      - Dominican Republic, Puerto Rico and Venezuela qualify for World Olympic Qualifying Tournament.

==== Canoeing ====
- Slalom World Championships in Bratislava, Slovakia:
  - Men's individual double canoe (C2M): (gold) Pavol Hochschorner/Peter Hochschorner (SVK) 106.76 (silver) Fabien Lefèvre/Denis Gargaud Chanut (FRA) 107.49 (bronze) Ladislav Škantár/Peter Škantár (SVK) 109.86
    - The Hochschorner twins win the event for the fifth time and their sixth world title overall.
  - Women's individual single kayak (K1W): (gold) Corinna Kuhnle (AUT) 110.05 (silver) Jana Dukátová (SVK) 113.33 (bronze) Maialen Chourraut (ESP) 113.58
    - Kuhnle wins the event for the second successive time.

==== Cricket ====
- Australia in Sri Lanka:
  - 2nd Test in Pallekele, day 3: Sri Lanka 174; Australia 411/7 (132 overs; Michael Hussey 142, Shaun Marsh 141). Australia lead by 237 runs with 3 wickets remaining in the 1st innings.
- ICC Intercontinental Cup:
  - In Deventer, day 4: Netherlands vs. Kenya. **Match abandoned without a ball bowled.**
    - Standings (after 1 match unless stated): Afghanistan, Ireland 20 points, Netherlands 17 (2), Kenya 16 (2), United Arab Emirates 14, Scotland 7, Namibia, Canada 0.

==== Cycling ====
- Grand Tours:
  - Vuelta a España, Stage 20 (all ITA): (gold) Daniele Bennati (Leopard Trek) 4h 39' 20" (silver) Enrico Gasparotto (Astana) s.t. (bronze) Damiano Caruso (Liquigas–Cannondale) s.t.
    - General classification (after stage 20): (1) Juan José Cobo (ESP) (Geox–TMC) 82h 38' 32" (2) Chris Froome (GBR) (Team Sky) + 13" (3) Bradley Wiggins (GBR) (Team Sky) + 1' 39"

==== Equestrianism ====
- Show jumping – Nations Cup Promotional League North and South America (2012):
  - Nations Cup of Canada in Calgary, Canada (CSIO 5*): (gold) France (Jerome Hurel, Marc Dilasser, Roger-Yves Bost) (silver) Canada (Jonathan Asselin, Tiffany Foster, Ian Millar, Eric Lamaze) (bronze) Switzerland (Martin Fuchs, Marc Örtly, Simone Wettstein, Christina Liebherr)

==== Figure skating ====
- ISU Junior Grand Prix:
  - JGP Brisbane in Brisbane, Australia:
    - Ice dancing: (gold) Nicole Orford/Thomas Williams (CAN) 127.21 points (silver) Lauri Bonacorsi/Travis Mager (USA) 123.62 (bronze) Valeria Zenkova/Valerie Sinitsin (RUS) 122.35
      - Standings (after 2 of 7 events): Orford/Williams, Maria Nosulia/Evgen Kholoniuk (UKR) 15 points, Bonacorsi/Mager, Evgenia Kosigina/Nikolai Moroshkin (RUS) 13, Zenkova/Sinitsin, Alexandra Aldridge/Daniel Eaton (USA) 11.
    - Men: (gold) Jason Brown (USA) 197.23 points (silver) Keiji Tanaka (JPN) 192.36 (bronze) Liam Firus (CAN) 180.00
      - Standings (after 2 of 7 events): Brown, Ryuju Hino (JPN) 15 points, Tananka, Zhang He (CHN) 13, Firus, Timothy Dolensky (USA) 11.

==== Football (soccer) ====
- FIFA Beach Soccer World Cup in Ravenna, Italy:
  - Semi finals:
    - El Salvador 3–7 **Russia**
    - **Brazil** 4–1 Portugal
- CAF Champions League Group stage Matchday 5 (team in **bold** advances to the semifinals):
  - Group A: Coton Sport (Cameroon) 2–1 (Morocco) Raja Casablanca
    - Standings (after 5 matches): (Nigeria) **Enyimba** 11 points, Coton Sport, (Sudan) Al-Hilal 7, Raja Casablanca 2.
  - Group B: Espérance ST (Tunisia) 4–0 (Algeria) MC Alger
    - Standings: Espérance ST 9 points (5 matches), (Morocco) Wydad Casablanca 6 (4), (Egypt) Al-Ahly 5 (4), MC Alger 2 (5).
- CAF Confederation Cup Group stage Matchday 5:
  - Group B: JS Kabylie (Algeria) 0–1 (Morocco) Maghreb de Fès
    - Standings: Maghreb de Fès 11 points (5 matches), (Democratic Republic of the Congo) Motema Pembe, (Nigeria) Sunshine Stars 7 (4), JS Kabylie 0 (5).

==== Horse racing ====
- English Thoroughbred Triple Crown:
  - St. Leger Stakes in Doncaster: (gold) Masked Marvel (trainer: John Gosden, jockey: William Buick) (silver) Brown Panther (trainer: Tom Dascombe, jockey: Kieren Fallon) (bronze) Sea Moon (trainer: Michael Stoute, jockey: Olivier Peslier)

==== Mixed martial arts ====
- Strikeforce World Grand Prix: Barnett vs. Kharitonov in Cincinnati, Ohio, United States:
  - Heavyweight Grand Prix Semifinal bout: **Josh Barnett** (USA) def. Sergei Kharitonov (RUS) via submission (arm triangle choke)
  - Heavyweight Grand Prix Semifinal bout: **Daniel Cormier** (USA) def. Antônio Silva (BRA) via KO (punches)
  - Middleweight Championship bout: **Luke Rockhold** (USA) def. Ronaldo Souza (BRA) (c) via unanimous decision (50–45, 48–47, 48–47)
  - Light Heavyweight bout: **Muhammed Lawal** (USA) def. Roger Gracie (BRA) via KO (punch)
  - Lightweight bout: **Pat Healy** (USA) def. Maximo Blanco (VEN) via submission (rear naked choke)

==== Modern pentathlon ====
- World Championships in Moscow, Russia:
  - Women's Individual: (gold) Victoria Tereshuk (UKR) 5544 points (silver) Sarolta Kovács (HUN) 5512 (bronze) Laura Asadauskaitė (LTU) 5504
  - Women's team: (gold) Germany (Lena Schöneborn, Annika Schleu, Eva Trautmann) (silver) Hungary (Leila Gyenesei, Kovács, Adrienn Tóth) (bronze) Russia (Jevdokija Grecsisnyikova, Julija Kolegova, Jekatyerina Huraszkina)

==== Open water swimming ====
- European Championships in Eilat, Israel:
  - Women's 5 km: (gold) Rachele Bruni (ITA) 55:51.0 (silver) Jana Pechanová (CZE) 57:06.0 (bronze) Coralie Codevelle (FRA) 57:16.7
  - Men's 5 km: (gold) Simone Ercoli (ITA) 53:34.9 (silver) Jan Wolfgarten (GER) 53:39.0 (bronze) Michael Dmitriev (ISR) 54:03.5
    - Bruni and Ercoli both win their second title of the championships.

==== Rugby league ====
- NRL Finals Series:
  - Qualifying Finals:
    - **Brisbane Broncos** 40–10 New Zealand Warriors
    - **Manly-Warringah Sea Eagles** 42–8 North Queensland Cowboys

==== Rugby union ====
- World Cup in New Zealand:
  - Pool A in Auckland: France 47–21 Japan
  - Pool B:
    - In Invercargill: Scotland 34–24 Romania
    - In Dunedin: Argentina 9–13 England
  - Pool D in Rotorua: Fiji 49–25 Namibia

==== Snooker ====
- Shanghai Masters in Shanghai, China, semi-finals:
  - Mark King (ENG) 0–6 **Mark Selby** (ENG)
  - **Mark Williams** (WAL) 6–5 Neil Robertson (AUS)

==== Tennis ====
- Grand Slams:
  - US Open in New York City, United States, day 13:
    - Men's Singles, semifinals:
      - **Novak Djokovic** (SRB) [1] def. Roger Federer (SUI) [3] 6–7(7), 4–6, 6–3, 6–2, 7–5
        - Djokovic reaches his third US Open final, and sixth Grand Slam final overall.
        - Federer fails to win a Grand Slam in a year for the first time since 2002.
      - **Rafael Nadal** (ESP) [2] def. Andy Murray (GBR) [4] 6–4, 6–2, 3–6, 6–2
        - Nadal reaches his second consecutive US Open final, and 14th Grand Slam final overall.
    - Women's Singles, semifinals:
      - **Serena Williams** (USA) [28] def. Caroline Wozniacki (DEN) [1] 6–2, 6–4
        - Williams reaches her fifth US Open final, and 17th Grand Slam final overall.
      - **Samantha Stosur** (AUS) [9] def. Angelique Kerber (GER) 6–3, 2–6, 6–2
        - Stosur reaches her second Grand Slam final.
    - Men's Doubles Final: **Jürgen Melzer** (AUT)/**Philipp Petzschner** (GER) [9] def. Mariusz Fyrstenberg (POL)/Marcin Matkowski (POL) [6] 6–2, 6–2
      - Melzer and Petzschner win their second Grand Slam title.

==== Triathlon ====
- ITU World Championships:
  - Grand Final in Beijing, China:
    - Men: (gold) Alistair Brownlee (GBR) 1:48:07 (silver) Sven Riederer (SUI) 1:48:15 (bronze) Jonathan Brownlee (GBR) 1:48:18
      - Final standings: (1) Alistair Brownlee 4285 points (2) Jonathan Brownlee 3992 (3) Javier Gómez (ESP) 3671
      - Brownlee wins the title for the second time.

==== Volleyball ====
- Men's European Championship in Austria and Czech Republic:
  - Pool A in Vienna, Austria:
    - Slovenia 3–0 Austria
    - Serbia 3–0 Turkey
  - Pool B in Karlovy Vary, Czech Republic:
    - Russia 3–0 Estonia
    - Portugal 2–3 Czech Republic
  - Pool C in Innsbruck, Austria:
    - France 3–1 Finland
    - Belgium 1–3 Italy
  - Pool D in Prague, Czech Republic:
    - Slovakia 3–2 Bulgaria
    - Germany 1–3 Poland

=== September 9, 2011 (Friday) ===
==== American football ====
- NCAA AP Top 25: Arizona State 37, (21) Missouri 30 (OT)

==== Australian rules football ====
- AFL Finals Series:
  - Second Qualifying Final in Melbourne: **Geelong** 14.14 (98)–9.13 (67) Hawthorn

==== Auto racing ====
- Nationwide Series:
  - Virginia 529 College Savings 250 in Richmond, Virginia: (1) (Nevada) Kyle Busch (Toyota; Joe Gibbs Racing) (2) (Missouri) Carl Edwards (Ford; Roush Fenway Racing) (3) (Mississippi) Ricky Stenhouse Jr. (Ford; Roush Fenway Racing)
    - Drivers' championship standings (after 27 of 34 races): (1) Stenhouse Jr. 950 points (2) (Virginia) Elliott Sadler (Chevrolet; Kevin Harvick Incorporated) 934 (3) (Georgia (U.S. state)) Reed Sorenson (Chevrolet; Turner Motorsports) 905

==== Basketball ====
- EuroBasket in Lithuania (teams in **bold** advance to the quarterfinals):
  - Group E in Vilnius:
    - **Spain** 84–59 Serbia
    - Germany 73–67 Turkey
    - Lithuania 67–73 **France**
      - Standings (after 4 games): France 8 points, Spain 7, Lithuania 6, Turkey, Serbia, Germany 5.
- FIBA Oceania Championship:
  - Game 2 in Brisbane: Australia 81–64 New Zealand. Australia lead 3-game series 2–0.
- FIBA Oceania Championship for Women:
  - Game 2 in Brisbane: Australia 92–73 New Zealand. Australia lead 3-game series 2–0.
    - Australia's men and women teams both qualify for 2012 Olympics.
    - New Zealand's teams qualify for World Olympic Qualifying Tournament.

==== Cricket ====
- Australia in Sri Lanka:
  - 2nd Test in Pallekele, day 2: Sri Lanka 174 (64.1 overs); Australia 264/3 (91.3 overs). Australia lead by 90 runs with 7 wickets remaining in the 1st innings.
- India in England:
  - 3rd ODI in London: India 234/7 (50 overs); England 218/7 (41.5/43 overs). **England win by 3 wickets (D/L); lead 5-match series 2–0.**
- ICC Intercontinental Cup:
  - In Belfast, day 4: Namibia 244 & 226; Ireland 298 & 176/5 (40.2 overs). **Ireland win by 5 wickets.**
  - In Deventer, day 3: Netherlands vs. Kenya. No play due to rain.

==== Cycling ====
- Grand Tours:
  - Vuelta a España, Stage 19: (gold) Igor Antón (ESP) (Euskaltel–Euskadi) 3h 53' 34" (silver) Marzio Bruseghin (ITA) (Movistar Team) + 41" (bronze) Dominik Nerz (GER) (Liquigas–Cannondale) + 1' 30"
    - General classification (after stage 19): (1) Juan José Cobo (ESP) (Geox–TMC) 77h 59' 12" (2) Chris Froome (GBR) (Team Sky) + 13" (3) Bradley Wiggins (GBR) (Team Sky) + 1' 41"
- UCI World Tour:
  - GP de Québec: (gold) Philippe Gilbert (BEL) (Omega Pharma–Lotto) 5h 03' 08" (silver) Robert Gesink (NED) (Rabobank) s.t. (bronze) Rigoberto Urán (COL) (Team Sky) + 9"
    - UCI World Tour standings (after 23 of 27 races): (1) Gilbert 648 points (2) Cadel Evans (AUS) (BMC Racing Team) 574 (3) Alberto Contador (ESP) (Saxo Bank–SunGard) 471

==== Figure skating ====
- ISU Junior Grand Prix:
  - JGP Brisbane in Brisbane, Australia:
    - Ladies: (gold) Courtney Hicks (USA) 151.91 points (silver) Risa Shoji (JPN) 147.49 (bronze) Vanessa Lam (USA) 145.48
      - Standings (after 2 of 7 events): Polina Shelepen (RUS), Hicks 15 points, Li Zijun (CHN), Shoji 13, Lam, Polina Agafonova (RUS) 11.

==== Football (soccer) ====
- CAF Champions League Group stage Matchday 5 (teams in **bold** advance to the semifinals):
  - Group A: Al-Hilal (Sudan) 1–2 (Nigeria) **Enyimba**
    - Standings: Enyimba 11 points (5 matches), Al-Hilal 7 (5), (Cameroon) Coton Sport 4 (4), (Morocco) Raja Casablanca 2 (4).

==== Rugby league ====
- NRL Finals Series:
  - Qualifying Final: **Wests Tigers** 21–12 St. George Illawarra Dragons

==== Rugby union ====
- World Cup in New Zealand:
  - Pool A in Auckland: New Zealand 41–10 Tonga

==== Snooker ====
- Shanghai Masters in Shanghai, China, quarter-finals:
  - Shaun Murphy (ENG) 4–5 **Mark Selby** (ENG)
  - **Mark King** (ENG) 5–2 Anthony Hamilton (ENG)
  - **Mark Williams** (WAL) 5–0 Matthew Stevens (WAL)
  - **Neil Robertson** (AUS) 5–2 John Higgins (SCO)

==== Surfing ====
- Men's World Tour:
  - Quiksilver Pro New York in Long Island, New York, United States: (1) Owen Wright (AUS) (2) Kelly Slater (USA) (3) Taj Burrow (AUS) & Alejo Muniz (BRA)
    - Standings (after 6 of 11 events): (1) Slater 34,950 points (2) Wright 31,900 (3) Joel Parkinson (AUS) 30,200

==== Tennis ====
- Grand Slams:
  - US Open in New York City, United States, day 12:
    - Men's Singles, quarterfinals:
      - **Rafael Nadal** (ESP) [2] def. Andy Roddick (USA) [21] 6–2, 6–1, 6–3
      - **Andy Murray** (GBR) [4] def. John Isner (USA) [28] 7–5, 6–4, 3–6, 7–6(2)
    - Mixed Doubles Final: **Melanie Oudin** (USA)/**Jack Sock** (USA) def. Gisela Dulko (ARG)/Eduardo Schwank (ARG) [8] 7–6(4), 4–6, [10–8]
      - Oudin and Sock both win their first Grand Slam title.

=== September 8, 2011 (Thursday) ===
==== American football ====
- NFL Week 1:
  - NFL Kickoff Game: Green Bay Packers 42, New Orleans Saints 34
- NCAA AP Top 10: (9) Oklahoma State 37, Arizona 14

==== Athletics ====
- IAAF Diamond League:
  - Weltklasse Zürich in Zürich, Switzerland:
    - Men:
      - 100m: Yohan Blake (JAM) 9.82
        - Final Diamond Race standings: (1) Asafa Powell (JAM) 18 points (2) Blake 8 (3) Nesta Carter (JAM) 4
      - 110m hurdles: Dayron Robles (CUB) 13.01
        - Final Diamond Race standings: (1) Robles 16 points (2) David Oliver (USA) 13 (3) Jason Richardson (USA) 10
      - 400m: Kirani James (GRN) 44.36
        - Final Diamond Race standings: (1) James 12 points (2) Jermaine Gonzales (JAM) 11 (3) Chris Brown (BAH) & LaShawn Merritt (USA) 6
      - 1500m: Nixon Chepseba (KEN) 3:32.74
        - Final Diamond Race standings: (1) Chepseba 12 points (2) Asbel Kiprop (KEN) 11 (3) Silas Kiplagat (KEN) 10
      - 3000m steeplechase: Ezekiel Kemboi (KEN) 8:07.72
        - Final Diamond Race standings: (1) Paul Kipsiele Koech (KEN) 17 points (2) Kemboi 16 (3) Benjamin Kiplagat (UGA) 5
      - 4 × 100 m relay: Jamaica (Lerone Clarke, Carter, Ainsley Waugh, Michael Frater) 38.31
      - Discus throw: Robert Harting (GER) 67.02m
        - Final Diamond Race standings: (1) Virgilijus Alekna (LTU) 17 points (2) Harting 16 (3) Gerd Kanter (EST) 9
      - High jump: Dimitrios Chondrokoukis (GRE) 2.32m
        - Final Diamond Race standings: (1) Andrey Silnov (RUS) & Jesse Williams (USA) 9 points (3) Hondrokoúkis 8
      - Long jump: Ngonidzashe Makusha (ZIM) 8.00m
        - Final Diamond Race standings: (1) Mitchell Watt (AUS) 12 points (2) Mukisha 8 (3) Aleksandr Menkov (RUS) 4
    - Women:
      - 100m hurdles: Sally Pearson (AUS) 12.52
      - 200m: Carmelita Jeter (USA) 22.27
        - Final Diamond Race standings: (1) Jeter 13 points (2) Allyson Felix (USA) & Bianca Knight (USA) 10
      - 400m hurdles: Kaliese Spencer (JAM) 53.36
        - Final Diamond Race standings: (1) Spencer 24 points (2) Melaine Walker (JAM) 10 (3) Zuzana Hejnová (CZE) & Lashinda Demus (USA) 8
      - 800m: Mariya Savinova (RUS) 1:58.27
        - Final Diamond Race standings: (1) Jenny Meadows (GBR) 11 points (2) Savinova & Kenia Sinclair (JAM) 10
      - 5000m: Vivian Cheruiyot (KEN) 14:30.10
        - Final Diamond Race standings: (1) Cheruiyot 20 points (2) Sally Kipyego (KEN) & Sentayehu Ejigu (ETH) 6
      - Javelin throw: Christina Obergföll (GER) 69.57m
        - Final Diamond Race standings: (1) Obergföll 28 points (2) Barbora Špotáková (CZE) 10 (3) Mariya Abakumova (RUS) 9
      - Long jump: Brittney Reese (USA) 6.72m
        - Final Diamond Race standings: (1) Reese 23 points (2) Funmi Jimoh (USA) 10 (3) Janay DeLoach (USA) 6
      - Pole vault: Jenn Suhr (USA) 4.72m
        - Final Diamond Race standings: (1) Silke Spiegelburg (GER) 14 points (2) Suhr 13 (3) Fabiana Murer (BRA) 10

==== Basketball ====
- EuroBasket in Lithuania (teams in **bold** advance to the quarterfinals):
  - Group F in Vilnius:
    - Georgia 63–65 **North Macedonia**
    - Finland 60–79 **Russia**
    - Slovenia 60–69 Greece
      - Standings (after 3 games): Russia, Macedonia 6 points, Greece 5, Slovenia 4, Georgia, Finland 3.
- FIBA Americas Championship in Mar del Plata, Argentina (teams in **bold** advance to the semifinals, team in italics qualifies for World Olympic Qualifying Tournament):
  - Second round:
    - Panama 91–89 Canada
    - Uruguay 80–92 Venezuela
    - **Argentina** 84–58 **Dominican Republic**
    - **Puerto Rico** 72–94 **Brazil**
      - Final standings: Brazil, Argentina 13 points, Puerto Rico 12, Dominican Republic 11, Venezuela 10, Canada 9, Uruguay, Panama 8.

==== Cricket ====
- Australia in Sri Lanka:
  - 2nd Test in Pallekele, day 1: Sri Lanka 174 (64.1 overs); Australia 60/0 (17.4 overs). Australia trail by 114 runs with 10 wickets remaining in the 1st innings.
- Pakistan in Zimbabwe:
  - 1st ODI in Bulawayo: Pakistan 247/7 (50 overs); Zimbabwe 242/7 (50 overs). **Pakistan win by 5 runs; lead 3-match series 1–0.**
- ICC Intercontinental Cup:
  - In Belfast, day 3: Namibia 244 & 226 (79.3 overs); Ireland 298 & 135/4 (32 overs). Ireland require another 38 runs with 6 wickets remaining.
  - In Deventer, day 2: Netherlands vs. Kenya. No play due to rain.

==== Cycling ====
- Grand Tours:
  - Vuelta a España, Stage 18: (gold) Francesco Gavazzi (ITA) (Lampre–ISD) 4h 24' 42" (silver) Kristof Vandewalle (BEL) (Quick-Step) s.t. (bronze) Alexandre Geniez (FRA) (Skil–Shimano) + 10"
    - General classification (after stage 18): (1) Juan José Cobo (ESP) (Geox–TMC) 74h 04' 05" (2) Chris Froome (GBR) (Team Sky) + 13" (3) Bradley Wiggins (GBR) (Team Sky) + 1' 41"

==== Football (soccer) ====
- 2012 Olympics Women's Asian Qualifiers Final Round in Jinan, China (team in **bold** qualifies for 2012 Olympics):
  - Thailand 0–3 South Korea
  - North Korea 1–1 **Japan**
  - Australia 1–0 China
    - Standings (after 4 matches): Japan 10 points, North Korea 8, Australia 6, China PR 5, South Korea 4, Thailand 0.
- FIFA Beach Soccer World Cup in Ravenna, Italy:
  - Quarter finals:
    - **Russia** 5–3 Mexico
    - **Portugal** 4–4 (3–2 pen.) Senegal
    - Italy 5–6 (a.e.t.) **El Salvador**
    - **Brazil** 10–8 (a.e.t.) Nigeria
- Copa Sudamericana Second stage:
  - First leg: Universidad Católica (Chile) 2–1 (Chile) Deportes Iquique
  - Second leg (first leg score in parentheses): **Vélez Sársfield** (Argentina) 4–0 (0–0) (Argentina) Argentinos Juniors. Vélez Sársfield win 4–1 on points.

==== Open water swimming ====
- European Championships in Eilat, Israel:
  - 5 km team event: (gold) Italy (Simone Ercoli, Luca Ferretti, Rachele Bruni) 56:12.4 (silver) Germany (Hendrik Rijkens, Rob Mufels, Svenja Zihsler) 57:15.2 (bronze) France (Sebastien Fraysse, Damien Cattin Vidal, Coralie Codevelle) 57:41.1

==== Snooker ====
- Shanghai Masters in Shanghai, China, last 16:
  - Jamie Cope (ENG) 0–5 **Mark Selby** (ENG)
  - **Mark Williams** (WAL) 5–1 Robert Milkins (ENG)
  - Stuart Bingham (ENG) 2–5 **John Higgins** (SCO)
  - **Mark King** (ENG) 5–3 Fergal O'Brien (IRL)
  - Ronnie O'Sullivan (ENG) 3–5 **Anthony Hamilton** (ENG)
  - **Matthew Stevens** (WAL) 5–1 Martin Gould (ENG)
  - **Shaun Murphy** (ENG) 5–4 Mark Allen (NIR)
  - **Neil Robertson** (AUS) 5–2 Michael Holt (ENG)

==== Tennis ====
- Grand Slams:
  - US Open in New York City, United States, day 11:
    - Men's Singles, fourth round:
      - **Rafael Nadal** (ESP) [2] def. Gilles Müller (LUX) 7–6(1), 6–1, 6–2
      - **Andy Murray** (GBR) [4] def. Donald Young (USA) 6–2, 6–3, 6–3
      - **Andy Roddick** (USA) [21] def. David Ferrer (ESP) [5] 6–3, 6–4, 3–6, 6–3
      - **John Isner** (USA) [28] def. Gilles Simon (FRA) [12] 7–6(2), 3–6, 7–6(2), 7–6(4)
    - Men's Singles, quarterfinals:
      - **Novak Djokovic** (SRB) [1] def. Janko Tipsarević (SRB) [20] 7–6(2), 6–7(3), 6–0, 3–0 retired
      - **Roger Federer** (SUI) [3] def. Jo-Wilfried Tsonga (FRA) [11] 6–4, 6–3, 6–3
    - Women's Singles, quarterfinals:
      - **Caroline Wozniacki** (DEN) [1] def. Andrea Petkovic (GER) [10] 6–1, 7–6(5)
      - **Samantha Stosur** (AUS) [9] def. Vera Zvonareva (RUS) [2] 6–3, 6–3
      - **Serena Williams** (USA) [28] def. Anastasia Pavlyuchenkova (RUS) [17] 7–5, 6–1
      - **Angelique Kerber** (GER) def. Flavia Pennetta (ITA) [26] 6–4, 4–6, 6–3

=== September 7, 2011 (Wednesday) ===
==== Athletics ====
- IAAF Diamond League:
  - Weltklasse Zürich in Zürich, Switzerland:
    - Men's shot put: Dylan Armstrong (CAN) 21.63m
    - Women's shot put: Valerie Adams (NZL) 20.51m
      - Final Diamond Race standings: (1) Adams 24 points (2) Nadzeya Astapchuk (BLR) 16 (3) Jillian Camarena-Williams (USA) 8

==== Basketball ====
- EuroBasket in Lithuania (team in **bold** advances to the quarterfinals):
  - Group E in Vilnius:
    - Germany 68–77 Spain
    - Turkey 64–68 **France**
    - Serbia 90–100 Lithuania
      - Standings (after 3 games): France 6 points, Spain, Lithuania 5, Serbia, Turkey 4, Germany 3.
- FIBA Americas Championship in Mar del Plata, Argentina (teams in **bold** advance to the semifinals):
  - Second round:
    - Canada 70–68 Uruguay
    - Venezuela 110–74 Panama
    - **Brazil** 73–71 **Argentina**
    - **Dominican Republic** 62–79 **Puerto Rico**
      - Standings (after 6 games): Argentina, Brazil, Puerto Rico 11 points, Dominican Republic 10, Venezuela, Canada 8, Uruguay 7, Panama 6.
- FIBA Oceania Championship:
  - Game 1 in Melbourne: Australia 91–78 New Zealand. Australia lead 3-game series 1–0.
- FIBA Oceania Championship for Women:
  - Game 1 in Melbourne: Australia 77–64 New Zealand. Australia lead 3-game series 1–0.

==== Cricket ====
- ICC Intercontinental Cup:
  - In Belfast, day 2: Namibia 244 & 58/1 (20 overs); Ireland 298 (83.5 overs; Andrew White 123*, Christi Viljoen 5/87). Namibia lead by 4 runs with 9 wickets remaining.
  - In Deventer, day 1: Netherlands vs. Kenya. No play due to rain.

==== Cycling ====
- Grand Tours:
  - Vuelta a España, Stage 17: (gold) Chris Froome (GBR) (Team Sky) 4h 52' 38" (silver) Juan José Cobo (ESP) (Geox–TMC) + 1" (bronze) Bauke Mollema (NED) (Rabobank) + 21"
    - General classification (after stage 17): (1) Cobo 69h 31' 41" (2) Froome + 13" (3) Bradley Wiggins (GBR) (Team Sky) + 1' 41"

==== Football (soccer) ====
- Copa Sudamericana Second stage, second leg (first leg score in parentheses): **Godoy Cruz** (Argentina) 0–0 (2–2) (Argentina) Lanús. 3–3 on points, 2–2 on aggregate; Godoy Cruz win on away goals.

==== Open water swimming ====
- European Championships in Eilat, Israel:
  - Women's 10 km: (gold) Martina Grimaldi (ITA) 2:00:18.6 (silver) Rachele Bruni (ITA) 2:00:19.2 (bronze) Nadine Reichert (GER) 2:00:20.0
  - Men's 10 km: (gold) Thomas Lurz (GER) 1:53:18.2 (silver) Vladimir Dyatchin (RUS) 1:53:20.0 (bronze) Igor Snitko (UKR) 1:53:21.5

==== Snooker ====
- Shanghai Masters in Shanghai, China, last 32:
  - **Mark Williams** (WAL) 5–0 Andrew Higginson (ENG)
  - Judd Trump (ENG) 1–5 **Stuart Bingham** (ENG)
  - **John Higgins** (SCO) 5–2 Mark Davis (ENG)
  - Graeme Dott (SCO) 2–5 **Michael Holt** (ENG)
  - Stephen Hendry (SCO) 1–5 **Robert Milkins** (ENG)
  - **Matthew Stevens** (WAL) 5–2 Stephen Lee (ENG)
  - Ding Junhui (CHN) 3–5 **Martin Gould** (ENG)
  - **Neil Robertson** (AUS) 5–1 Liang Wenbo (CHN)

==== Tennis ====
- Grand Slams:
  - US Open in New York City, United States, day 10:
    - Men's Singles, fourth round (all matches suspended):
      - Gilles Müller (LUX) vs. Rafael Nadal (ESP) [2] 3–0
      - Donald Young (USA) vs. Andy Murray (GBR) [4] 2–1
      - David Ferrer (ESP) [5] vs. Andy Roddick (USA) [21] 1–3

=== September 6, 2011 (Tuesday) ===
==== Auto racing ====
- Sprint Cup Series:
  - AdvoCare 500 in Hampton, Georgia: (1) (California) Jeff Gordon (Chevrolet; Hendrick Motorsports) (2) (California) Jimmie Johnson (Chevrolet; Hendrick Motorsports) (3) (Indiana) Tony Stewart (Chevrolet; Stewart Haas Racing)
    - Gordon wins his 85th race in the series, moving into third place on the all-time wins list, ahead of Bobby Allison and Darrell Waltrip, and also surpassing Waltrip for the most wins in NASCAR's modern era.
    - Drivers' championship standings (after 25 of 36 races): (1) Johnson 873 points (2) (Nevada) Kyle Busch (Toyota; Joe Gibbs Racing) 852 (3) (Missouri) Carl Edwards (Ford; Roush Fenway Racing) 835

==== Basketball ====
- FIBA Americas Championship in Mar del Plata, Argentina (teams in **bold** advance to the semifinals):
  - Second round:
    - **Puerto Rico** 79–74 Canada
    - Uruguay 76–84 **Dominican Republic**
    - **Argentina** 111–93 Venezuela
    - Panama 65–90 **Brazil**
      - Standings (after 5 games): Argentina 10 points, Brazil, Puerto Rico, Dominican Republic 9, Venezuela, Canada, Uruguay 6, Panama 5.

==== Cricket ====
- India in England:
  - 2nd ODI in Southampton: India 187/8 (23/23 overs); England 188/3 (22.1 overs). **England win by 7 wickets; lead 5-match series 1–0.**
- ICC Intercontinental Cup:
  - In Belfast, day 1: Namibia 244 (70.1 overs; George Dockrell 5/71); Ireland 75/4 (20.4 overs). Ireland trail by 169 runs with 6 wickets remaining in the 1st innings.

==== Cycling ====
- Grand Tours:
  - Vuelta a España, Stage 16: (gold) Juan José Haedo (ARG) (Saxo Bank–SunGard) 4h 41' 56" (silver) Alessandro Petacchi (ITA) (Lampre–ISD) s.t. (bronze) Daniele Bennati (ITA) (Leopard Trek) s.t.
    - General classification (after stage 16): (1) Juan José Cobo (ESP) (Geox–TMC) 64h 39' 14" (2) Chris Froome (GBR) (Team Sky) + 22" (3) Bradley Wiggins (GBR) (Team Sky) + 51"

==== Football (soccer) ====
- UEFA Euro 2012 qualifying, matchday 10 (teams in **bold** qualify for the Finals):
  - Group A:
    - Azerbaijan 3–2 Kazakhstan
    - Austria 0–0 Turkey
      - Standings (after 8 matches): **Germany** 24 points, Turkey 14, Belgium 12, Austria 8, Azerbaijan 7, Kazakhstan 3.
  - Group B:
    - Russia 0–0 Republic of Ireland
    - North Macedonia 1–0 Andorra
    - Slovakia 0–4 Armenia
      - Standings (after 8 matches): Russia 17 points, Republic of Ireland 15, Armenia, Slovakia 14, Macedonia 7, Andorra 0.
  - Group C:
    - Serbia 3–1 Faroe Islands
    - Estonia 4–1 Northern Ireland
    - **Italy** 1–0 Slovenia
      - Standings: Italy 22 points (8 matches), Serbia 14 (8), Estonia 13 (9), Slovenia 11 (9), Northern Ireland 9 (8), Faroe Islands 4 (10).
  - Group D:
    - Bosnia and Herzegovina 1–0 Belarus
    - Luxembourg 2–1 Albania
    - Romania 0–0 France
      - Standings: France 17 points (8 matches), Bosnia and Herzegovina 16 (8), Romania 12 (8), Belarus 12 (9), Albania 8 (8), Luxembourg 4 (9).
  - Group E:
    - Finland 0–2 **Netherlands**
    - Moldova 0–2 Hungary
    - San Marino 0–5 Sweden
      - Standings: Netherlands 24 points (8 matches), Sweden 18 (8), Hungary 18 (9), Finland 9 (8), Moldova 6 (8), San Marino 0 (9).
  - Group F:
    - Croatia 3–1 Israel
    - Latvia 1–1 Greece
    - Malta 1–1 Georgia
      - Standings: Croatia 19 points (8 matches), Greece 18 (8), Israel 13 (9), Georgia 10 (9), Latvia 8 (8), Malta 1 (8).
  - Group G:
    - Switzerland 3–1 Bulgaria
    - England 1–0 Wales
      - Standings: England 17 points (7 matches), Montenegro 11 (6), Switzerland 8 (6), Bulgaria 5 (7), Wales 3 (6).
  - Group H:
    - Denmark 2–0 Norway
    - Iceland 1–0 Cyprus
      - Standings: Portugal, Denmark 13 points (6 matches), Norway 13 (7), Iceland 4 (7), Cyprus 2 (6).
  - Group I:
    - Scotland 1–0 Lithuania
    - **Spain** 6–0 Liechtenstein
      - Standings: Spain 18 points (6 matches), Czech Republic 10 (6), Scotland 8 (6), Lithuania 5 (7), Liechtenstein 4 (7).
- 2014 FIFA World Cup qualification – AFC third round, matchday 2:
  - Group A:
    - Singapore 0–2 Iraq
    - Jordan 2–1 China
      - Standings (after 2 matches): Jordan 6 points, China PR, Iraq 3, Singapore 0.
  - Group B:
    - Lebanon 3–1 United Arab Emirates
    - Kuwait 1–1 South Korea
      - Standings (after 2 matches): South Korea, Kuwait 4 points, Lebanon 3, United Arab Emirates 0.
  - Group C:
    - North Korea 1–0 Tajikistan
    - Uzbekistan 1–1 Japan
      - Standings (after 2 matches): Uzbekistan, Japan 4 points, North Korea 3, Tajikistan 0.
  - Group D:
    - Thailand 3–0 Oman
    - Saudi Arabia 1–3 Australia
      - Standings (after 2 matches): Australia 6 points, Thailand 3, Saudi Arabia, Oman 1.
  - Group E:
    - Indonesia 0–2 Bahrain
    - Qatar 1–1 Iran
      - Standings (after 2 matches): Iran, Bahrain 4 points, Qatar 2, Indonesia 0.
- 2014 FIFA World Cup qualification – CONCACAF second round, matchday 2:
  - Group A:
    - Dominican Republic 1–1 Suriname
    - Cayman Islands 1–4 El Salvador
      - Standings (after 2 matches): El Salvador 6 points, Suriname 4, Dominican Republic 1, Cayman Islands 0.
  - Group B:
    - Barbados 0–2 Trinidad and Tobago
    - Guyana 2–1 Bermuda
      - Standings (after 2 matches): Guyana, Trinidad and Tobago 6 points, Bermuda, Barbados 0.
  - Group C: Nicaragua 1–2 Panama
    - Standings: Nicaragua 3 points (2 matches), Panama 3 (1), Dominica 0 (1).
  - Group D:
    - Saint Lucia 2–4 Saint Kitts and Nevis
    - Puerto Rico 0–3 Canada
      - Standings (after 2 matches): Canada 6 points, Saint Kitts and Nevis 4, Puerto Rico 1, Saint Lucia 0.
  - Group E: Belize 1–2 Guatemala
    - Standings: Guatemala 6 points (2 matches), Belize 3 (2), Grenada, Saint Vincent and the Grenadines 0 (1).
  - Group F:
    - U.S. Virgin Islands 1–8 Antigua and Barbuda
    - Curaçao 2–4 Haiti
      - Standings (after 2 matches): Antigua and Barbuda, Haiti 6 points, Curaçao, U.S. Virgin Islands 0.
- Friendly internationals (top 10 in FIFA World Rankings):
  - Poland 2–2 (3) Germany
  - (9) Argentina 3–1 Nigeria in Dhaka, Bangladesh
- FIFA Beach Soccer World Cup in Ravenna, Italy (teams in **bold** advance to the quarterfinals):
  - Group C:
    - Venezuela 3–7 **Russia**
    - Tahiti 1–4 **Nigeria**
      - Final standings: Russia 9 points, Nigeria 6, Tahiti 3, Venezuela 0.
  - Group D:
    - Ukraine 1–1 (0–1 pen.) **Mexico**
    - **Brazil** 3–2 Japan
      - Final standings: Brazil 8 points, Mexico 5, Ukraine 3, Japan 0.
- Copa Sudamericana Second stage, second leg (first leg score in parentheses): Estudiantes (Argentina) 1–0 (0–2) (Argentina) **Arsenal**. 3–3 on points, Arsenal win 2–1 on aggregate.

==== Snooker ====
- Shanghai Masters in Shanghai, China, last 32:
  - **Mark Allen** (NIR) 5–2 Ryan Day (WAL)
  - **Shaun Murphy** (ENG) 5–4 Dominic Dale (WAL)
  - Ali Carter (ENG) 4–5 **Mark King** (ENG)
  - Peter Ebdon (ENG) 3–5 **Fergal O'Brien** (IRL)
  - **Ronnie O'Sullivan** (ENG) 5–1 James Wattana (THA)
  - **Jamie Cope** (ENG) 5–3 Jack Lisowski (ENG)
  - Stephen Maguire (SCO) 4–5 **Anthony Hamilton** (ENG)
  - **Mark Selby** (ENG) 5–3 Nigel Bond (ENG)

==== Tennis ====
- Grand Slams:
  - US Open in New York City, United States, day 9: All matches postponed due to inclement weather.

=== September 5, 2011 (Monday) ===
==== Basketball ====
- EuroBasket in Lithuania (teams in **bold** advance to the Second round):
  - Group A in Panevėžys:
    - Great Britain 88–81 Poland
    - **Spain** 57–65 **Turkey**
    - Portugal 69–98 **Lithuania**
      - Final standings: Spain, Lithuania 9 points, Turkey 8, Great Britain, Poland 7, Portugal 5.
  - Group B in Šiauliai:
    - Israel 96–95 (OT) Italy
    - Latvia 80–81 **Germany**
    - **Serbia** 96–97 (OT) **France**
      - Final standings: France 10 points, Serbia 9, Germany 8, Israel 7, Italy 6, Latvia 5.
  - Group C in Alytus:
    - **Finland** 71–65 Montenegro
    - **Greece** 74–69 Croatia
    - **North Macedonia** 75–63 Bosnia and Herzegovina
      - Final standings: Macedonia, Greece 9 points, Finland, Croatia, Bosnia and Herzegovina 7, Montenegro 6.
  - Group D in Klaipėda:
    - **Georgia** 69–79 Bulgaria
    - **Slovenia** 64–65 **Russia**
    - Ukraine 74–61 Belgium
      - Final standings: Russia 10 points, Slovenia 9, Georgia, Bulgaria, Ukraine 7, Belgium 5.
- FIBA Americas Championship in Mar del Plata, Argentina:
  - Second round:
    - Dominican Republic 92–68 Panama
    - Venezuela 82–94 Puerto Rico
    - Canada 53–79 Argentina
    - Brazil 93–66 Uruguay
      - Standings (after 4 games): Argentina 8 points, Puerto Rico, Brazil, Dominican Republic 7, Venezuela, Canada, Uruguay 5, Panama 4.

==== Cricket ====
- Pakistan in Zimbabwe:
  - Only Test in Bulawayo, day 5: Zimbabwe 412 & 141 (56.3 overs); Pakistan 466 & 88/3 (21.4 overs). **Pakistan win by 7 wickets**.

==== Football (soccer) ====
- 2012 Olympics Women's Asian Qualifiers Final Round in Jinan, China:
  - South Korea 2–3 North Korea
  - Japan 1–0 Australia
  - Thailand 0–2 China
    - Standings (after 3 matches): Japan 9 points, North Korea 7, China PR 5, Australia 3, South Korea 1, Thailand 0.
- Friendly internationals (top 10 in FIFA World Rankings):
  - (6) Brazil 1–0 Ghana in London, England
- FIFA Beach Soccer World Cup in Ravenna, Italy (teams in **bold** advance to the quarterfinals):
  - Group A:
    - Iran 3–5 **Senegal**
    - **Italy** 3–2 Switzerland
      - Final standings: Italy 7 points, Senegal 5, Switzerland 3, Iran 0.
  - Group B:
    - **Portugal** 8–3 Oman
    - **El Salvador** 4–3 Argentina
      - Final standings: Portugal 9 points, El Salvador 6, Argentina 3, Oman 0.

==== Golf ====
- PGA Tour:
  - FedEx Cup Playoffs: Deutsche Bank Championship in Norton, Massachusetts (all USA):
    - Winner: Webb Simpson 269 (−15)^{PO}
      - Simpson defeats Chez Reavie on the second playoff hole to win his second tournament in three weeks, and also his second career PGA Tour title.
      - Fedex Cup standings: (1) Simpson 4711 points (2) Dustin Johnson 3814 (3) Matt Kuchar 3124

==== Snooker ====
- Shanghai Masters in Shanghai, China, wildcard round:
  - **Anthony Hamilton** (ENG) 5–0 Li Hang (CHN)
  - **Jack Lisowski** (ENG) 5–2 Rouzi Maimaiti (CHN)
  - **James Wattana** (THA) 5–1 Jin Long (CHN)
  - **Fergal O'Brien** (IRL) 5–1 Hossein Vafaei (IRI)
  - **Robert Milkins** (ENG) 5–0 Tang Jun (CHN)
  - **Michael Holt** (ENG) 5–3 Cai Jianzhong (CHN)
  - **Nigel Bond** (ENG) 5–2 Thanawat Thirapongpaiboon (THA)
  - **Dominic Dale** (WAL) 5–3 Cao Xinlong (CHN)

==== Tennis ====
- Grand Slams:
  - US Open in New York City, United States, day 8:
    - Men's Singles, fourth round:
      - **Novak Djokovic** (SRB) [1] def. Alexandr Dolgopolov (UKR) [22] 7–6(14), 6–4, 6–2
      - **Roger Federer** (SUI) [3] def. Juan Mónaco (ARG) 6–1, 6–2, 6–0
      - **Jo-Wilfried Tsonga** (FRA) [11] def. Mardy Fish (USA) [8] 6–4, 6–7(5), 3–6, 6–4, 6–2
      - **Janko Tipsarević** (SRB) [20] def. Juan Carlos Ferrero (ESP) 7–5, 6–7(3), 7–5, 6–2
    - Women's Singles, fourth round:
      - **Caroline Wozniacki** (DEN) [1] def. Svetlana Kuznetsova (RUS) [15] 6–7(6), 7–5, 6–1
      - **Anastasia Pavlyuchenkova** (RUS) [17] def. Francesca Schiavone (ITA) [7] 5–7, 6–3, 6–4
      - **Andrea Petkovic** (GER) [10] def. Carla Suárez Navarro (ESP) 6–1, 6–4
      - **Serena Williams** (USA) [28] def. Ana Ivanovic (SRB) [16] 6–3, 6–4

=== September 4, 2011 (Sunday) ===
==== American football ====
- NCAA AP Top 10: (8) Texas A&M 46, SMU 14

==== Athletics ====
- World Championships in Daegu, South Korea:
  - Men's Marathon: (gold) Abel Kirui (KEN) 2:07:38 (silver) Vincent Kipruto (KEN) 2:10:06 (bronze) Feyisa Lilesa (ETH) 2:10:32
    - Kirui wins the event for the second successive time.
  - Women's hammer throw: (gold) Tatyana Lysenko (RUS) 77.13m (silver) Betty Heidler (GER) 76.06m (bronze) Zhang Wenxiu (CHN) 75.03m
  - Men's triple jump: (gold) Christian Taylor (USA) 17.96m (silver) Phillips Idowu (GBR) 17.77m (bronze) Will Claye (USA) 17.50m
  - Men's 5000 metres: (gold) Mo Farah (GBR) 13:23.36 (silver) Bernard Lagat (USA) 13:23.64 (bronze) Dejen Gebremeskel (ETH) 13:23.92
    - Ethiopian Imane Merga is originally awarded the bronze medal, but he is later disqualified.
  - Women's 800 metres: (gold) Mariya Savinova (RUS) 1:55.87 (silver) Caster Semenya (RSA) 1:56.35 (bronze) Janeth Jepkosgei (KEN) 1:57.42
  - Women's 4 × 100 metres relay: (gold) United States (Bianca Knight, Allyson Felix, Marshevet Myers, Carmelita Jeter) 41.56 (silver) Jamaica (Shelly-Ann Fraser-Pryce, Kerron Stewart, Sherone Simpson, Veronica Campbell-Brown) 41.70 (bronze) Ukraine (Olesya Povh, Nataliya Pohrebnyak, Mariya Ryemyen, Khrystyna Stuy) 42.51
    - Felix wins the event for the second time, and her second title of the championships and eighth overall.
    - Jeter wins the event for the second time, and her second title of the championships and third overall.
  - Men's 4 × 100 metres relay: (gold) Jamaica (Nesta Carter, Michael Frater, Yohan Blake, Usain Bolt) 37.04 (WR) (silver) France (Teddy Tinmar, Christophe Lemaitre, Yannick Lesourd, Jimmy Vicaut) 38.20 (bronze) Saint Kitts and Nevis (Jason Rogers, Kim Collins, Antoine Adams, Brijesh Lawrence) 38.49
    - Jamaica win the event for the second successive time.
    - Bolt wins the event for the second time, and his second title of the championships and fifth overall.
    - Frater wins the event for the second time.
    - Blake wins his second title of the championships.

==== Auto racing ====
- Sprint Cup Series:
  - AdvoCare 500 in Hampton, Georgia: Race postponed to 11:00 am EDT on September 6, due to rain.
- IndyCar Series:
  - Baltimore Grand Prix in Baltimore: (1) Will Power (AUS) (Team Penske) (2) Oriol Servià (ESP) (Newman/Haas Racing) (3) Tony Kanaan (BRA) (KV Racing Technology – Lotus)
    - Drivers' championship standings (after 15 of 18 races): (1) Dario Franchitti (GBR) (Chip Ganassi Racing) 507 points (2) Power 502 (3) Scott Dixon (NZL) (Chip Ganassi Racing) 430
- World Touring Car Championship:
  - Race of Spain in Valencia:
    - Race 1: (1) Yvan Muller (FRA) (Chevrolet; Chevrolet Cruze) (2) Alain Menu (SUI) (Chevrolet; Chevrolet Cruze) (3) Tom Coronel (NED) (ROAL Motorsport; BMW 320 TC)
    - Race 2: (1) Muller (2) Robert Huff (GBR) (Chevrolet; Chevrolet Cruze) (3) Menu
      - Drivers' championship standings (after 9 of 12 rounds): (1) Muller 333 points (2) Huff 317 (3) Menu 253

==== Basketball ====
- EuroBasket in Lithuania (teams in **bold** advance to the Second round):
  - Group A in Panevėžys:
    - Great Britain 85–73 Portugal
    - Poland 84–83 Turkey
    - **Lithuania** 79–91 **Spain**
      - Standings (after 4 games): Spain 8 points, Lithuania 7, Poland, Turkey 6, Great Britain 5, Portugal 4.
  - Group B in Šiauliai:
    - Israel 91–88 Latvia
    - Italy 84–91 **France**
    - **Germany** 64–75 **Serbia**
      - Standings (after 4 games): Serbia, France 8 points, Germany 6, Italy, Israel 5, Latvia 4.
  - Group C in Alytus:
    - **North Macedonia** 72–70 Finland
    - Montenegro 55–71 Greece
    - Bosnia and Herzegovina 92–80 Croatia
      - Standings (after 4 games): Macedonia, Greece 7 points, Bosnia and Herzegovina, Croatia 6, Finland, Montenegro 5.
  - Group D in Klaipėda:
    - Georgia 69–53 Ukraine
    - Bulgaria 77–89 **Russia**
    - Belgium 61–70 **Slovenia**
      - Standings (after 4 games): Russia, Slovenia 8 points, Georgia 6, Ukraine, Bulgaria 5, Belgium 4.

==== Cricket ====
- Pakistan in Zimbabwe:
  - Only Test in Bulawayo, day 4: Zimbabwe 412 & 135/8 (54 overs); Pakistan 466 (156.1 overs). Zimbabwe lead by 81 runs with 2 wickets remaining.

==== Cycling ====
- Grand Tours:
  - Vuelta a España, Stage 15: (gold) Juan José Cobo (ESP) (Geox–TMC) 4h 01' 56" (silver) Wout Poels (NED) (Vacansoleil–DCM) + 48" (bronze) Denis Menchov (RUS) (Geox–TMC) + 48"
    - General classification (after stage 15): (1) Cobo 59h 57' 16" (2) Chris Froome (GBR) (Team Sky) + 20" (3) Bradley Wiggins (GBR) (Team Sky) + 46"
- Mountain Bike & Trials World Championships in Champéry, Switzerland:
  - Women's downhill: (gold) Emmeline Ragot (FRA) 4:54.012 (silver) Rachel Atherton (GBR) 5:09.303 (bronze) Claire Buchar (CAN) 5:21.965
  - Men's downhill: (gold) Danny Hart (GBR) 3:41.989 (silver) Damien Spagnolo (FRA) 3:53.688 (bronze) Samuel Blenkinsop (NZL) 3:54.982
  - Men's trials 26": (gold) Bjorn Levin (SWE) (silver) Vladyslav Chernysh (UKR) (bronze) Sam Oliver (GBR)

==== Equestrianism ====
- Eventing – Burghley Horse Trials at Burghley House, United Kingdom (CCI 4*): (gold) William Fox-Pitt (GBR) on Parklane Hawk (silver) Andrew Nicholson (NZL) on Nereo (bronze) Mary King (GBR) on Kings Temptress
- Show jumping – Global Champions Tour:
  - 9th Competition in Rio de Janeiro, Brazil (CSI 5*): (gold) Gerco Schröder (NED) on London (silver) Edwina Alexander (AUS) on Itot du Château (bronze) Philipp Weishaupt (GER) on Monte Bellini
    - Standings (after 9 of 10 competitions): (1) Alexander 238 points (2) Ludger Beerbaum (GER) 218.5 (3) Álvaro de Miranda Neto (BRA) 194

==== Football (soccer) ====
- 2012 Africa Cup of Nations qualification, matchday 5 (teams in **bold** qualify for the Finals):
  - Group A: Zimbabwe 3–0 Liberia
    - Standings (after 5 matches): Mali 9 points, Zimbabwe 8, Cape Verde 7, Liberia 4.
  - Group B:
    - Madagascar 0–2 Nigeria
    - Guinea 1–0 Ethiopia
      - Standings (after 5 matches): Guinea 13 points, Nigeria 10, Ethiopia 4, Madagascar 1.
  - Group C: Comoros 1–2 Zambia
    - Standings (after 5 matches): Zambia 12 points, Libya 11, Mozambique 4, Comoros 1.
  - Group D: Central African Republic 0–0 Morocco
    - Standings (after 5 matches): Morocco, Central African Republic 8 points, Tanzania, Algeria 5.
  - Group G: Niger 2–1 South Africa
    - Standings (after 5 matches): Niger 9 points, South Africa, Sierra Leone 8, Egypt 2.
  - Group H: Burundi 1–1 Benin
    - Standings (after 5 matches): **Ivory Coast** 15 points, Burundi, Benin 5, Rwanda 3.
  - Group I: Congo 0–1 Sudan
    - Standings (after 5 matches): Ghana, Sudan 13 points, Congo 3, Swaziland 0.
  - Group J: Angola 2–0 Uganda
    - Standings (after 5 matches): Uganda 10 points, Angola 9, Kenya 7, Guinea-Bissau 3.
  - Group K: Togo 1–0 **Botswana**
    - Standings (after 7 matches unless stated): Botswana 17 points (8 matches), Malawi, Tunisia 11, Togo 6, Chad 2.
- FIFA Beach Soccer World Cup in Ravenna, Italy (teams in **bold** advance to the quarterfinals):
  - Group C:
    - Venezuela 3–5 Nigeria
    - **Russia** 5–0 Tahiti
      - Standings (after 2 matches): Russia 6 points, Nigeria, Tahiti 3, Venezuela 0.
  - Group D:
    - Ukraine 4–2 Japan
    - Mexico 2–5 **Brazil**
      - Standings (after 2 matches): Brazil 5 points, Ukraine, Mexico 3, Japan 0.

==== Golf ====
- European Tour:
  - Omega European Masters in Crans-Montana, Switzerland:
    - Winner: Thomas Bjørn (DEN) 264 (−20)
      - Bjørn wins for the second successive week, for his third European Tour title of the year, and 13th of his career.

==== Hurling ====
- All-Ireland Championship Final in Dublin: **Kilkenny** 2–17–1–16 Tipperary
  - Kilkenny win the title for the 33rd time.

==== Motorcycle racing ====
- Moto GP:
  - San Marino Grand Prix in Misano Adriatico, Italy (ESP unless stated):
    - MotoGP: (1) Jorge Lorenzo (Yamaha) (2) Dani Pedrosa (Honda) (3) Casey Stoner (AUS) (Honda)
      - Riders' championship standings (after 13 of 18 races): (1) Stoner 259 points (2) Pedrosa 224 (3) Andrea Dovizioso (ITA) (Honda) 185
    - Moto2: (1) Marc Márquez (Suter) (2) Stefan Bradl (GER) (Kalex) (3) Andrea Iannone (ITA) (Suter)
      - Riders' championship standings (after 12 of 17 races): (1) Bradl 213 points (2) Márquez 190 (3) Iannone 112
    - 125cc: (1) Nicolás Terol (Aprilia) (2) Johann Zarco (FRA) (Derbi) (3) Efrén Vázquez (Derbi)
      - Riders' championship standings (after 12 of 17 races): (1) Terol 216 points (2) Zarco 185 (3) Maverick Viñales (Aprilia) 161
- Superbike:
  - Nürburgring World Championship round in Nürburg, Germany:
    - Race 1: (1) Carlos Checa (ESP) (Ducati 1098R) (2) Marco Melandri (ITA) (Yamaha YZF-R1) (3) Noriyuki Haga (JPN) (Ducati 1098R)
    - Race 2: (1) Tom Sykes (GBR) (Kawasaki Ninja ZX-10R) (2) Sylvain Guintoli (FRA) (Ducati 1098R) (3) Jakub Smrž (CZE) (Ducati 1098R)
      - Riders' championship standings (after 10 of 13 rounds): (1) Checa 376 points (2) Melandri 302 (3) Max Biaggi (ITA) (Aprilia RSV4) 281
- Supersport:
  - Nürburgring World Championship round in Nürburg, Germany (all GBR): (1) Chaz Davies (Yamaha YZF-R6) (2) James Ellison (Honda CBR600RR) (3) Sam Lowes (Honda CBR600RR)
    - Riders' championship standings (after 9 of 12 rounds): (1) Davies 171 points (2) David Salom (ESP) (Kawasaki Ninja ZX-6R) 112 (3) Fabien Foret (FRA) (Honda CBR600RR) 111

==== Rowing ====
- World Championships in Lake Bled, Slovenia:
  - Men:
    - Lightweight quadruple sculls (LM4x): (gold) Italy (Francesco Rigon, Daniele Gilardoni, Franco Sancassani, Stefano Basalini) 6:00.95 (silver) Germany (Michael Wieler, Stefan Wallat, Jonas Schützeberg, Ingo Voigt) 6:01.08 (bronze) Denmark (Steffen Jensen, Martin Batenburg, Christian Nielsen, Hans Christian Sørensen) 6:02.81
      - Gilardoni wins the event for the 11th time.
      - Sancassani wins the event for the eighth time and his ninth title overall.
      - Basalini wins the event for the fourth time and his seventh title overall.
    - Lightweight Eights (LM8+): (gold) Australia (Thomas Bertrand, Ross Brown, Blair Tunevitsch, Thomas Gibson, Alister Foot, Roderick Chisholm, Nicholas Baker, Darryn Purcell, David Webster) 5:44.57 (silver) Italy (Luigi Scala, Fabrizio Gabriele, Davide Riccardi, Gianluca Santi, Livio La Padula, Catello Amarante, Jiri Vlcek, Giorgio Tuccinardi, Gianluca Barattolo) 5:44.73 (bronze) Denmark (Lasse Dittmann, Daniel Graff, Anders Hansen, Jens Vilhelmsen, Thorbjørn Patscheider, Jacob Larsen, Christian Pedersen, Martin Kristensen, Emil Blach) 5:46.75
      - Webster wins his second world championships title.
    - Coxless fours (M4-): (gold) Great Britain (Matt Langridge, Richard Egington, Tom James, Alex Gregory) 5:55.18 (silver) Greece (Stergios Papachristos, Ioannis Tsilis, Georgios Tziallas, Ioannis Christou) 5:57.20 (bronze) Australia (Samuel Loch, Drew Ginn, Nicholas Purnell, Josh Dunkley-Smith) 5:58.44
      - Egington, James and Gregory all win the event for the second time.
    - Lightweight double sculls (LM2x): (gold) Great Britain (Zac Purchase, Mark Hunter) 6:18.67 (silver) New Zealand (Storm Uru, Peter Taylor) 6:19.01 (bronze) Italy (Lorenzo Bertini, Elia Luini) 6:21.33
      - Purchase and Hunter win the event for the second successive time.
      - Purchase also wins his third title overall.
  - Women:
    - Lightweight double sculls (LW2x): (gold) Greece (Christina Giazitzidou, Alexandra Tsiavou) 6:59.80 (silver) Canada (Lindsay Jennerich, Patricia Obee) 7:03.46 (bronze) Great Britain (Hester Goodsell, Sophie Hosking) 7:04.33
      - Giazitzidou and Tsiavou win the event for the second time.
    - Single sculls (W1x): (gold) Mirka Knapková (CZE) 7:26.64 (silver) Ekaterina Karsten (BLR) 7:28.68 (bronze) Emma Twigg (NZL) 7:30.68
  - Adaptive:
    - Mixed coxed fours (LTAMix4+): (gold) Great Britain (Pam Relph, Naomi Riches, David Smith, James Roe, Lily van den Broecke) 3:27.10 (silver) Canada (Anthony Theriault, David Blair, Victoria Nolan, Meghan Montgomery, Laura Comeau) 3:31.84 (bronze) Germany (Anke Molkenthin, Christiane Quirin, Martin Lossau, Michael Schulz, Katrin Splitt) 3:33.27

==== Rugby union ====
- (New Zealand) ITM Cup Championship Final in Palmerston North: Manawatu 30–35 **Hawke's Bay**
  - Hawke's Bay secures a place in the 2012 ITM Cup Premiership.

==== Tennis ====
- Grand Slams:
  - US Open in New York City, United States, day 7:
    - Men's Singles, third round:
      - **Rafael Nadal** (ESP) [2] def. David Nalbandian (ARG) 7–6(5), 6–1, 7–5
      - **Andy Murray** (GBR) [4] def. Feliciano López (ESP) [25] 6–1, 6–4, 6–2
      - **David Ferrer** (ESP) [5] def. Florian Mayer (GER) [26] 6–1, 6–2, 7–6(2)
    - Women's Singles, fourth round:
      - **Vera Zvonareva** (RUS) [2] def. Sabine Lisicki (GER) [22] 6–2, 6–3
      - **Samantha Stosur** (AUS) [9] def. Maria Kirilenko (RUS) [25] 6–2, 6–7(15), 6–3
      - **Flavia Pennetta** (ITA) [26] def. Peng Shuai (CHN) [13] 6–4, 7–6(6)
      - **Angelique Kerber** (GER) def. Monica Niculescu (ROM) 6–4, 6–3

=== September 3, 2011 (Saturday) ===
==== American football ====
- NCAA AP Top 10:
  - (1) Oklahoma 47, Tulsa 14
  - (2) Alabama 48, Kent State 7
  - Cowboys Classic in Arlington, Texas: (3) LSU 40, (4) Oregon 27
  - Chick-fil-A Kickoff Game in Atlanta: (5) Boise State 35, (19) Georgia 21
  - (6) Florida State 34, Louisiana–Monroe 0
  - (7) Stanford 57, San Jose State 3
  - (9) Oklahoma State 61, Louisiana–Lafayette 34
  - (10) Nebraska 40, Chattanooga 7
- Other games: South Florida 23, (16) Notre Dame 20

==== Athletics ====
- World Championships in Daegu, South Korea:
  - Men's 50 kilometres walk: (gold) Sergey Bakulin (RUS) 3:41:24 (silver) Denis Nizhegorodov (RUS) 3:42:45 (bronze) Jared Tallent (AUS) 3:43:36
  - Women's high jump: (gold) Anna Chicherova (RUS) 2.03m (silver) Blanka Vlašić (CRO) 2.03m (bronze) Antonietta Di Martino (ITA) 2.00m
  - Men's javelin throw: (gold) Matthias de Zordo (GER) 86.27m (silver) Andreas Thorkildsen (NOR) 84.78m (bronze) Guillermo Martínez (CUB) 84.30m
  - Women's 800 metres T54: (gold) Diane Roy (CAN) 1:50.91 (silver) Wakako Tsuchida (JPN) 1:51.11 (bronze) Shelly Woods (GBR) 1:51.27
  - Men's 400 metres T53: (gold) Richard Colman (AUS) 49.36 (silver) Byung-hoon Yoo (KOR) 50.69 (bronze) Dong-ho Jung (KOR) 50.76
  - Men's 1500 metres: (gold) Asbel Kiprop (KEN) 3:35.69 (silver) Silas Kiplagat (KEN) 3:35.92 (bronze) Matthew Centrowitz Jr. (USA) 3:36.08
  - Women's 4 × 400 metres relay: (gold) United States (Sanya Richards-Ross; Allyson Felix; Jessica Beard; Francena McCorory) 3:18.09 (silver) Jamaica (Rosemarie Whyte; Davita Prendergast; Novlene Williams-Mills; Shericka Williams) 3:18.71 (bronze) Russia (Antonina Krivoshapka; Natalya Antyukh; Lyudmila Litvinova; Anastasiya Kapachinskaya) 3:19.36
    - The United States win the event for the third successive time.
    - Richards-Ross wins the event for the fourth time and her fifth title overall.
    - Felix wins the event for the third time and her seventh title overall.
    - Beard wins the event for the second time.
  - Women's 100 metres hurdles: (gold) Sally Pearson (AUS) 12.28 (CR) (silver) Danielle Carruthers (USA) 12.47 (bronze) Dawn Harper (USA) 12.47
    - Pearson sets the fastest time since 1992 and becomes the fourth-best all-time athlete in this event.
  - Men's 200 metres: (gold) Usain Bolt (JAM) 19.40 (silver) Walter Dix (USA) 19.70 (bronze) Christophe Lemaitre (FRA) 19.80
    - Bolt wins the event for the second successive time and his fourth title overall, as he sets the fourth-best time in this event.

==== Auto racing ====
- Nationwide Series:
  - Great Clips 300 in Hampton, Georgia: (1) (Missouri) Carl Edwards (Ford; Roush Fenway Racing) (2) (Nevada) Kyle Busch (Toyota; Joe Gibbs Racing) (3) (Mississippi) Ricky Stenhouse Jr. (Ford; Roush Fenway Racing)
    - Drivers' championship standings (after 26 of 34 races): (1) Stenhouse Jr. 909 points (2) (Virginia) Elliott Sadler (Chevrolet; Kevin Harvick Incorporated) 896 (3) (Georgia (U.S. state)) Reed Sorenson (Chevrolet; Turner Motorsports) 869

==== Basketball ====
- EuroBasket in Lithuania (team in **bold** advances to the Second round):
  - Group C in Alytus:
    - Finland 92–64 Bosnia and Herzegovina
    - Greece 58–72 North Macedonia
    - Croatia 87–81 Montenegro
      - Standings (after 3 games): Greece, Macedonia, Croatia 5 points, Finland, Montenegro, Bosnia and Herzegovina 4.
  - Group D in Klaipėda:
    - Ukraine 67–56 Bulgaria
    - **Slovenia** 87–75 Georgia
    - Russia 79–58 Belgium
      - Standings (after 3 games): Russia, Slovenia 6 points, Georgia, Ukraine, Bulgaria 4, Belgium 3.
- FIBA Americas Championship in Mar del Plata, Argentina (teams in **bold** advance to the quarterfinals):
  - Group A:
    - **Venezuela** 103–98 **Canada**
    - Cuba 83–93 **Brazil**
      - Final standings: **Dominican Republic**, Brazil 7 points, Venezuela, Canada 6, Cuba 4.
  - Group B:
    - **Uruguay** 79–66 Paraguay
    - **Argentina** 90–71 **Panama**
      - Final standings: Argentina 8 points,**Puerto Rico** 7, Uruguay 6, Panama 5, Paraguay 4.

==== Cricket ====
- Australia in Sri Lanka:
  - 1st Test in Galle, day 4: Australia 273 & 210; Sri Lanka 105 & 253 (95.5 overs; Mahela Jayawardene 105, Ryan Harris 5/62). **Australia win by 125 runs; lead 3-match series 1–0.**
- Pakistan in Zimbabwe:
  - Only Test in Bulawayo, day 3: Zimbabwe 412; Pakistan 357/5 (120.1 overs; Mohammad Hafeez 119). Pakistan trail by 55 runs with 5 wickets remaining in the 1st innings.
- India in England:
  - 1st ODI in Chester-le-Street: India 274/7 (50 overs); England 27/2 (7.2 overs). **No result; 5-match series tied 0–0.**

==== Cycling ====
- Grand Tours:
  - Vuelta a España, Stage 14: (gold) Rein Taaramäe (EST) (Cofidis) 4h 39' 01" (silver) Juan José Cobo (ESP) (Geox–TMC) + 25" (bronze) David de la Fuente (ESP) (Geox–TMC) + 29"
    - General classification (after stage 14): (1) Bradley Wiggins (GBR) (Team Sky) 55h 54' 45" (2) Chris Froome (GBR) (Team Sky) + 7" (3) Bauke Mollema (NED) (Rabobank) + 36"
- Mountain Bike & Trials World Championships in Champéry, Switzerland:
  - Women's cross-country: (gold) Catharine Pendrel (CAN) 1:46:14 (silver) Maja Włoszczowska (POL) 1:46:42 (bronze) Eva Lechner (ITA) 1:47:50
  - Men's cross-country: (gold) Jaroslav Kulhavý (CZE) 1:44:30 (silver) Nino Schurter (SUI) 1:45:17 (bronze) Julien Absalon (FRA) 1:45:56
  - Men's trials 20": (gold) Benito Ros (ESP) (silver) Abel Mustieles (ESP) (bronze) Gilles Coustellier (FRA)

==== Equestrianism ====
- Show jumping – Nations Cup European Promotional League:
  - Nations Cup of Spain in Gijón, Spain (CSIO 5*): (gold) Spain (Pilar Cordón, Eduardo Alvarez Aznar, Jesus Garmendia, Julio Arias Cueva) (silver) Great Britain (Scott Brash, David McPherson, Bruce Menzies, Robert Whitaker) (bronze) Sweden (Malin Baryard-Johnsson, Helena Persson, Peder Fredricson, Svante Johansson)
    - Final standings: (1) Switzerland 60.5 points (2) Sweden 54 (3) Italy 48.5
    - Switzerland are promoted to the 2012 FEI Nations Cup.

==== Figure skating ====
- ISU Junior Grand Prix:
  - JGP Volvo Cup in Riga, Latvia:
    - Men: (gold) Ryuju Hino (JPN) 182.71 points (silver) Zhang He (CHN) 182.38 (bronze) Timothy Dolensky (USA) 176.77
    - Ice dancing: (gold) Maria Nosulia/Evgen Kholoniuk (UKR) 124.84 points (silver) Evgenia Kosigina/Nikolai Moroshkin (RUS) 119.24 (bronze) Alexandra Aldridge/Daniel Eaton (USA) 118.18

==== Football (soccer) ====
- UEFA Euro 2012 qualifying, matchday 9:
  - Group I: Scotland 2–2 Czech Republic
    - Standings: Spain 15 points (5 matches), Czech Republic 10 (6), Scotland 5 (5), Lithuania 5 (6), Liechtenstein 4 (6).
- 2012 Africa Cup of Nations qualification, matchday 5 (teams in **bold** qualify for the Finals):
  - Group A: Mali 3–0 Cape Verde
    - Standings: Mali 9 points (5 matches), Cape Verde 7 (5), Zimbabwe 5 (4), Liberia 4 (4).
  - Group C: Libya 1–0 Mozambique
    - Standings: Libya 11 points (5 matches), Zambia 9 (4), Mozambique 4 (5), Comoros 1 (4).
  - Group D: Tanzania 1–1 Algeria
    - Standings: Morocco, Central African Republic 7 points (4 matches), Tanzania, Algeria 5 (5).
  - Group E:
    - Cameroon 6–0 Mauritius
    - **Senegal** 2–0 Congo DR
      - Standings (after 5 matches): Senegal 13 points, Cameroon 8, Congo DR 7, Mauritius 0.
  - Group F: Namibia 1–0 Gambia
    - Standings: **Burkina Faso** 9 points (3 matches), Gambia 3 (3), Namibia 3 (4).
  - Group G: Sierra Leone 2–1 Egypt
    - Standings: South Africa 8 points (4 matches), Sierra Leone 8 (5), Niger 6 (4), Egypt 2 (4).
  - Group H: Rwanda 0–5 **Ivory Coast**
    - Standings: Côte d'Ivoire 15 points (5 matches), Burundi, Benin 4 (4), Rwanda 3 (5).
  - Group J: Kenya 2–1 Guinea-Bissau
    - Standings: Uganda 10 points (4 matches), Kenya 7 (5), Angola 6 (4), Guinea-Bissau 3 (5).
  - Group K: Malawi 0–0 Tunisia
    - Standings: **Botswana** 17 points (7 matches), Malawi, Tunisia 11 (7), Togo 3 (6), Chad 2 (7).
- 2012 Olympics Women's Asian Qualifiers Final Round in Jinan, China:
  - Australia 5–1 Thailand
  - China 0–0 North Korea
  - South Korea 1–2 Japan
    - Standings (after 2 matches): Japan 6 points, North Korea 4, Australia 3, China PR 2, South Korea 1, Thailand 0.
- FIFA Beach Soccer World Cup in Ravenna, Italy (team in **bold** advances to the quarterfinals):
  - Group A:
    - Iran 4–6 Switzerland
    - Senegal 4–4 (2–3 pen.) Italy
      - Standings (after 2 matches): Italy 4 points, Switzerland 3, Senegal 2, Iran 0.
  - Group B:
    - **Portugal** 5–0 Argentina
    - Oman 3–4 El Salvador
      - Standings (after 2 matches): Portugal 6 points, Argentina, El Salvador 3, Oman 0.

==== Rowing ====
- World Championships in Lake Bled, Slovenia:
  - Men:
    - Quadruple sculls (M4x): (gold) Australia (Chris Morgan, James McRae, Karsten Forsterling, Daniel Noonan) 5:39.31 (silver) Germany (Karl Schulze, Philipp Wende, Lauritz Schoof, Tim Grohmann) 5:39.56 (bronze) Croatia (David Šain, Martin Sinković, Damir Martin, Valent Sinković) 5:42.82
      - Morgan wins his second world championships title.
    - Coxless pairs (M2-): (gold) New Zealand (Eric Murray, Hamish Bond) 6:14.77 (silver) Great Britain (Pete Reed, Andrew Triggs-Hodge) 6:16.27 (bronze) Italy (Niccolò Mornati, Lorenzo Carboncini) 6:21.33
      - Murray and Bond win the event for the third successive time and their fourth title overall.
    - Single sculls (M1x): (gold) Mahé Drysdale (NZL) 6:39.56 (silver) Ondřej Synek (CZE) 6:40.05 (bronze) Alan Campbell (GBR) 6:44.86
      - Drysdale wins the event for the fifth time.
  - Women:
    - Lightweight quadruple sculls (LW4x): (gold) Great Britain (Stephanie Cullen, Imogen Walsh, Kathryn Twyman, Andrea Dennis) 6:28.14 (silver) China (Pan Dandan, Tang Chanjuan, Liu Jing, Yan Xiaohua) 6:30.41 (bronze) United States (Hillary Saeger, Nicole Dinion, Lindsey Hochman, Katherine Robinson) 6:33.91
    - Coxless fours (W4-): (gold) United States (Sarah Zelenka, Kara Kohler, Emily Regan, Sara Hendershot) 6:30.30 (silver) Australia (Peta White, Renee Chatterton, Pauline Frasca, Kate Hornsey) 6:31.18 (bronze) Netherlands (Wianka van Dorp, Olivia van Rooijen, Ellen Hogerwerf, Femke Dekker) 6:34.06
    - Double sculls (W2x): (gold) Great Britain (Anna Watkins, Katherine Grainger) 6:44.73 (silver) Australia (Kerry Hore, Kim Crow) 6:45.98 (bronze) New Zealand (Fiona Paterson, Anna Reymer) 6:46.74
      - Watkins and Grainger win the event for the second successive time.
      - Grainger also wins her sixth title overall.
  - Adaptive:
    - Mixed double sculls (TAMix2x): (gold) China (Lou Xiaoxian, Fei Tianming) (silver) France (Perle Bouge, Stephane Tardieu) (bronze) Australia (John Maclean, Kathryn Ross)

==== Rugby union ====
- (New Zealand) ITM Cup Premiership Final in Hamilton: Waikato 3–12 **Canterbury**
  - Canterbury win the title for the fourth successive time and ninth overall.

==== Tennis ====
- Grand Slams:
  - US Open in New York City, United States, day 6:
    - Men's Singles, third round:
      - **Novak Djokovic** (SRB) [1] def. Nikolay Davydenko (RUS) 6–3, 6–4, 6–2
      - **Roger Federer** (SUI) [3] def. Marin Čilić (CRO) [27] 6–3, 4–6, 6–4, 6–2
      - **Mardy Fish** (USA) [8] def. Kevin Anderson (RSA) 6–4, 7–6(4), 7–6(3)
      - **Janko Tipsarević** (SRB) [20] def. Tomáš Berdych (CZE) [9] 6–4, 5–0 retired
    - Women's Singles, third round:
      - **Caroline Wozniacki** (DEN) [1] def. Vania King (USA) 6–2, 6–4
      - **Serena Williams** (USA) [28] def. Victoria Azarenka (BLR) [4] 6–1, 7–6(5)
      - **Francesca Schiavone** (ITA) [7] def. Chanelle Scheepers (RSA) 5–7, 7–6(5), 6–3
      - **Andrea Petkovic** (GER) [10] def. Roberta Vinci (ITA) [18] 6–4, 6–0

==== Volleyball ====
- Men's NORCECA Championship in Mayagüez, Puerto Rico:
  - Bronze medal match: (bronze) **Canada** 3–0 Puerto Rico
  - Final: (silver) United States 2–3 (gold) **Cuba**
    - Cuba win the title for the second successive time and 15th overall.
    - Cuba and the United States both qualify for the World Cup.

=== September 2, 2011 (Friday) ===
==== American football ====
- NCAA AP Top 25: Baylor 50, (14) TCU 48

==== Athletics ====
- World Championships in Daegu, South Korea:
  - Men's shot put: (gold) David Storl (GER) 21.78m (silver) Dylan Armstrong (CAN) 21.64m (bronze) Andrei Mikhnevich (BLR) 21.40m
  - Women's javelin throw: (gold) Mariya Abakumova (RUS) 71.99m (CR) (silver) Barbora Špotáková (CZE) 71.58m (bronze) Sunette Viljoen (RSA) 68.38m
    - Abakumova sets the second best all-time result.
  - Men's long jump: (gold) Dwight Phillips (USA) 8.45m (silver) Mitchell Watt (AUS) 8.33m (bronze) Ngonidzashe Makusha (ZIM) 8.29m
    - Phillips wins the event for the second successive time and fourth time overall.
  - Women's 5000 metres: (gold) Vivian Cheruiyot (KEN) 14:55.36 (silver) Sylvia Jebiwott Kibet (KEN) 14:56.21 (bronze) Meseret Defar (ETH) 14:56.94
    - Cheruiyot wins the event for the second successive time, and her second title of the championships and third overall.
  - Women's 200 metres: (gold) Veronica Campbell-Brown (JAM) 22.22 (silver) Carmelita Jeter (USA) 22.37 (bronze) Allyson Felix (USA) 22.42
    - Campbell-Brown wins her second world championships title.
  - Men's 4 × 400 metres relay: (gold) United States (Greg Nixon, Bershawn Jackson, Angelo Taylor, LaShawn Merritt) 2:59.31 (silver) South Africa (Shane Victor, Ofentse Mogawane, Willem de Beer, L. J. van Zyl) 2:59.87 (bronze) Jamaica (Allodin Fothergill, Jermaine Gonzales, Riker Hylton, Leford Green) 3:00.10
    - The United States win the event for the fourth successive time.
    - Merritt wins the event for the third time and his fourth title overall.
    - Taylor wins the event for the third time.
    - Jackson wins the event for the second time and his third title overall.

==== Basketball ====
- EuroBasket in Lithuania (teams in **bold** advance to the Second round):
  - Group A in Panevėžys:
    - Spain 88–69 Great Britain
    - Portugal 73–81 Poland
    - Turkey 68–75 **Lithuania**
      - Standings (after 3 games): Lithuania, Spain 6 points, Turkey 5, Poland 4, Portugal, Great Britain 3.
  - Group B in Šiauliai:
    - **Serbia** 89–80 Israel
    - Latvia 62–71 Italy
    - France 76–65 Germany
      - Standings (after 3 games): France, Serbia 6 points, Germany 5, Italy 4, Latvia, Israel 3.
- FIBA Americas Championship in Mar del Plata, Argentina (teams in **bold** advance to the quarterfinals):
  - Group A:
    - **Canada** 84–62 Cuba
    - **Brazil** 74–79 **Dominican Republic**
      - Standings (after 3 games unless stated): Dominican Republic 7 points (4 games), Brazil, Canada 5, **Venezuela** 4, Cuba 3.
  - Group B:
    - Panama 61–77 Uruguay
    - **Puerto Rico** 74–81 **Argentina**
      - Standings (after 3 games unless stated): Puerto Rico 7 points (4 games), Argentina 6, Uruguay, Panama 4, Paraguay 3.

==== Cricket ====
- Australia in Sri Lanka:
  - 1st Test in Galle, day 3: Australia 273 & 210 (59.2 overs; Rangana Herath 5/79); Sri Lanka 105 & 120/5 (52 overs). Sri Lanka require another 259 runs with 5 wickets remaining.
- Pakistan in Zimbabwe:
  - Only Test in Bulawayo, day 2: Zimbabwe 412 (150.4 overs; Tino Mawoyo 163*); Pakistan 116/1 (29 overs). Pakistan trail by 296 runs with 9 wickets remaining in the 1st innings.

==== Cycling ====
- Grand Tours:
  - Vuelta a España, Stage 13: (gold) Michael Albasini (SUI) (HTC–Highroad) 4h 19' 39" (silver) Eros Capecchi (ITA) (Liquigas–Cannondale) s.t. (bronze) Daniel Moreno (ESP) (Team Katusha) s.t.
    - General classification (after stage 13): (1) Bradley Wiggins (GBR) (Team Sky) 51h 14' 59" (2) Vincenzo Nibali (ITA) (Liquigas–Cannondale) + 4" (3) Chris Froome (GBR) (Team Sky) + 7"
- Mountain Bike & Trials World Championships in Champéry, Switzerland:
  - Women's trials: (gold) Karin Moor (SUI) (silver) Gemma Abant (ESP) (bronze) Mireia Abant (ESP)
  - Men's four-cross: (gold) Michal Prokop (CZE) (silver) Roger Rinderknecht (SUI) (bronze) Joost Wichman (NED)
  - Women's four-cross: (gold) Anneke Beerten (NED) (silver) Fionn Griffiths (GBR) (bronze) Celine Gros (FRA)

==== Figure skating ====
- ISU Junior Grand Prix:
  - JGP Volvo Cup in Riga, Latvia:
    - Pairs: (gold) Sui Wenjing/Han Cong (CHN) 152.08 points (silver) Yu Xiaoyu/Jin Yang (CHN) 139.70 (bronze) Margaret Purdy/Michael Marinaro (CAN) 134.46
    - Ladies: (gold) Polina Shelepen (RUS) 153.40 points (silver) Li Zijun (CHN) 148.19 (bronze) Polina Agafonova (RUS) 141.84

==== Football (soccer) ====
- UEFA Euro 2012 qualifying, matchday 9 (team in **bold** qualify for the Finals):
  - Group A:
    - Azerbaijan 1–1 Belgium
    - Turkey 2–1 Kazakhstan
    - **Germany** 6–2 Austria
      - Standings: Germany 24 points (8 matches), Turkey 13 (7), Belgium 12 (8), Austria 7 (7), Azerbaijan 4 (7), Kazakhstan 3 (7).
  - Group B:
    - Andorra 0–3 Armenia
    - Russia 1–0 North Macedonia
    - Republic of Ireland 0–0 Slovakia
      - Standings (after 7 matches): Russia 16 points, Republic of Ireland, Slovakia 14, Armenia 11, Macedonia 4, Andorra 0.
  - Group C:
    - Slovenia 1–2 Estonia
    - Faroe Islands 0–1 Italy
    - Northern Ireland 0–1 Serbia
      - Standings: Italy 19 points (7 matches), Slovenia 11 (8), Serbia 11 (7), Estonia 10 (8), Northern Ireland 9 (7), Faroe Islands 4 (9).
  - Group D:
    - Luxembourg 0–2 Romania
    - Belarus 0–2 Bosnia and Herzegovina
    - Albania 1–2 France
      - Standings: France 16 points (7 matches), Bosnia and Herzegovina 13 (7), Belarus 12 (8), Romania 11 (7), Albania 8 (7), Luxembourg 1 (8).
  - Group E:
    - Finland 4–1 Moldova
    - Hungary 2–1 Sweden
    - Netherlands 11–0 San Marino
      - Standings: Netherlands 21 points (7 matches), Sweden 15 (7), Hungary 15 (8), Finland 9 (7), Moldova 6 (7), San Marino 0 (8).
  - Group F:
    - Israel 0–1 Greece
    - Malta 1–3 Croatia
    - Georgia 0–1 Latvia
      - Standings: Greece 17 points (7 matches), Croatia 16 (7), Israel 13 (8), Georgia 9 (8), Latvia 7 (7), Malta 0 (7).
  - Group G:
    - Bulgaria 0–3 England
    - Wales 2–1 Montenegro
      - Standings: England 14 points (6 matches), Montenegro 11 (6), Switzerland 5 (5), Bulgaria 5 (6), Wales 3 (5).
  - Group H:
    - Norway 1–0 Iceland
    - Cyprus 0–4 Portugal
      - Standings: Portugal, Norway 13 points (6 matches), Denmark 10 (5), Cyprus 2 (5), Iceland 1 (6).
  - Group I: Lithuania 0–0 Liechtenstein
    - Standings: Spain 15 points (5 matches), Czech Republic 9 (5), Lithuania 5 (6), Scotland 4 (4), Liechtenstein 4 (6).
- 2012 Africa Cup of Nations qualification, matchday 5:
  - Group I: Ghana 2–0 Swaziland
    - Standings: Ghana 13 points (5 matches), Sudan 10 (4), Congo 3 (4), Swaziland 0 (5).
- 2014 FIFA World Cup qualification – AFC third round, matchday 1:
  - Group A:
    - China 2–1 Singapore
    - Iraq 0–2 Jordan
  - Group B:
    - South Korea 6–0 Lebanon
    - United Arab Emirates 2–3 Kuwait
  - Group C:
    - Japan 1–0 North Korea
    - Tajikistan 0–1 Uzbekistan
  - Group D:
    - Australia 2–1 Thailand
    - Oman 0–0 Saudi Arabia
  - Group E:
    - Iran 3–0 Indonesia
    - Bahrain 0–0 Qatar
- 2014 FIFA World Cup qualification – CONCACAF second round, matchday 1:
  - Group A:
    - Suriname 1–0 Cayman Islands
    - El Salvador 3–2 Dominican Republic
  - Group B:
    - Trinidad and Tobago 1–0 Bermuda
    - Guyana 2–0 Barbados
  - Group C: Dominica 0–2 Nicaragua
  - Group D:
    - Canada 4–1 Saint Lucia
    - Saint Kitts and Nevis 0–0 Puerto Rico
  - Group E:
    - Grenada 0–2 Belize
    - Guatemala 4–0 Saint Vincent and the Grenadines
  - Group F:
    - Haiti 6–0 U.S. Virgin Islands
    - Antigua and Barbuda 5–2 Curaçao
- Friendly internationals (top 10 in FIFA World Rankings):
  - (2) Spain 3–2 Chile in St. Gallen, Switzerland
  - Ukraine 2–3 (5) Uruguay
  - (9) Argentina 1–0 Venezuela in Kolkata, India
- FIFA Beach Soccer World Cup in Ravenna, Italy:
  - Group C:
    - Nigeria 4–8 Russia
    - Tahiti 5–2 Venezuela
  - Group D:
    - Japan 2–3 Mexico
    - Brazil 3–3 (2–1 pen.) Ukraine

==== Rowing ====
- World Championships in Lake Bled, Slovenia:
  - Men:
    - Coxed pairs (M2+): (gold) Italy (Vincenzo Capelli, Pierpaolo Frattini, Niccolo Fanchi) 6:56.45 (silver) Australia (William Lockwood, James Chapman, David Webster) 6:58.20 (bronze) Canada (Kevin Light, Steve Van Knotsenburg, Brian Price) 7:00.76
    - Lightweight single sculls (LM1x): (gold) Henrik Stephansen (DEN) 6:54.73 (silver) Pietro Ruta (ITA) 7:01.54 (bronze) Duncan Grant (NZL) 7:03.30
    - Double sculls (M2x): (gold) New Zealand (Nathan Cohen, Joseph Sullivan) 6:10.76 (silver) Germany (Hans Gruhne, Stephan Krüger) 6:10.82 (bronze) France (Cédric Berrest, Julien Bahain) 6:14.31
      - Cohen and Sullivan win the event for the second successive time.
    - Lightweight coxless fours (LM4-): (gold) Australia (Anthony Edwards, Samuel Beltz, Ben Cureton, Todd Skipworth) 5:55.10 (silver) Italy (Daniele Danesin, Andrea Caianiello, Marcello Miani, Martino Goretti) 5:56.33 (bronze) Great Britain (Richard Chambers, Chris Bartley, Paul Mattick, Rob Williams) 5:57.33
  - Women:
    - Lightweight single sculls (LW1x): (gold) Fabiana Beltrame (BRA) 7:44.58 (silver) Pamela Weisshaupt (SUI) 7:48.24 (bronze) Lena Müller (GER) 7:50.44
    - Eights (W8+): (gold) United States (Esther Lofgren, Susan Francia, Meghan Musnicki, Taylor Ritzel, Jamie Redman, Amanda Polk, Caroline Lind, Elle Logan, Mary Whipple) 6:03.65 (silver) Canada (Janine Hanson, Rachelle Viinberg, Natalie Mastracci, Cristy Nurse, Krista Guloien, Ashley Brzozowicz, Darcy Marquardt, Andréanne Morin, Lesley Thompson) 6:04.39 (bronze) Great Britain (Alison Knowles, Jo Cook, Jessica Eddie, Louisa Reeve, Natasha Page, Lindsey Maguire, Katie Solesbury, Victoria Thornley, Caroline O'Connor) 6:06.03
      - The United States win the event for the fifth successive time.
  - Adaptive:
    - Men's single sculls (ASM1x): (gold) Tom Aggar (GBR) 4:58.01 (silver) Alexey Chuvashev (RUS) 5:00.09 (bronze) Erik Horrie (AUS) 5:04.75
      - Aggar wins the event for the fourth successive time.

==== Tennis ====
- Grand Slams:
  - US Open in New York City, United States, day 5:
    - Men's Singles, second round:
      - **Rafael Nadal** (ESP) [2] def. Nicolas Mahut (FRA) 6–2, 6–2 retired
      - **Andy Murray** (GBR) [4] def. Robin Haase (NED) 6–7(5), 2–6, 6–2, 6–0, 6–4
      - **David Ferrer** (ESP) [5] def. James Blake (USA) 6–4, 6–3, 6–4
    - Women's Singles, third round:
      - **Vera Zvonareva** (RUS) [2] def. Anabel Medina Garrigues (ESP) [30] 6–4, 7–5
      - **Flavia Pennetta** (ITA) [26] def. Maria Sharapova (RUS) [3] 6–3, 3–6, 6–4
      - **Samantha Stosur** (AUS) [9] def. Nadia Petrova (RUS) [24] 7–6(5), 6–7(5), 7–5

==== Volleyball ====
- Men's NORCECA Championship in Mayagüez, Puerto Rico:
  - Semifinals:
    - Canada 2–3 **Cuba**
    - **United States** 3–0 Puerto Rico
      - United States and Cuba both qualify for FIVB World Cup.

=== September 1, 2011 (Thursday) ===
==== Athletics ====
- World Championships in Daegu, South Korea:
  - Men's high jump: (gold) Jesse Williams (USA) 2.35m (silver) Aleksey Dmitrik (RUS) 2.35m (bronze) Trevor Barry (BAH) 2.32m
  - Women's triple jump: (gold) Olha Saladukha (UKR) 14.94m (silver) Olga Rypakova (KAZ) 14.89m (bronze) Caterine Ibargüen (COL) 14.84m
  - Men's 3000 metres steeplechase: (gold) Ezekiel Kemboi (KEN) 8:14.85 (silver) Brimin Kipruto (KEN) 8:16.05 (bronze) Mahiedine Mekhissi-Benabbad (FRA) 8:16.09
    - Kemboi wins the event for the second successive time.
  - Women's 1500 metres: (gold) Jennifer Simpson (USA) 4:05.40 (silver) Hannah England (GBR) 4:05.68 (bronze) Natalia Rodríguez (ESP) 4:05.87
  - Women's 400 metres hurdles: (gold) Lashinda Demus (USA) 52.47 (silver) Melaine Walker (JAM) 52.73 (bronze) Natalya Antyukh (RUS) 53.85
    - Demus wins her second world championship title.
  - Men's 400 metres hurdles: (gold) Dai Greene (GBR) 48.26 (silver) Javier Culson (PUR) 48.44 (bronze) L. J. van Zyl (RSA) 48.80

==== Basketball ====
- EuroBasket in Lithuania:
  - Group A in Panevėžys:
    - Portugal 73–87 Spain
    - Great Britain 61–90 Turkey
    - Poland 77–97 Lithuania
      - Standings (after 2 games): Turkey, Lithuania, Spain 4 points, Poland, Portugal, Great Britain 2.
  - Group B in Šiauliai:
    - Latvia 77–92 Serbia
    - Israel 68–85 France
    - Italy 62–76 Germany
      - Standings (after 2 games): Germany, France, Serbia 4 points, Italy, Latvia, Israel 2.
  - Group C in Alytus:
    - Bosnia and Herzegovina 94–86 Montenegro
    - Finland 61–81 Greece
    - North Macedonia 78–76 Croatia
      - Standings (after 2 games): Greece 4 points, Croatia, Bosnia and Herzegovina, Montenegro, Macedonia 3, Finland 2.
  - Group D in Klaipėda:
    - Bulgaria 68–65 Belgium
    - Georgia 58–65 Russia
    - Ukraine 64–68 Slovenia
      - Standings (after 2 games): Russia, Slovenia 4 points, Georgia, Bulgaria 3, Ukraine, Belgium 2.
- FIBA Americas Championship in Mar del Plata, Argentina (teams in **bold** advance to the quarterfinals):
  - Group A:
    - Cuba 69–106 Venezuela
    - **Dominican Republic** 72–73 Canada
      - Standings: Dominican Republic 5 points (3 games), **Brazil** 4 (2), Venezuela 4 (3), Canada 3 (2), Cuba 2 (2).
  - Group B:
    - Paraguay 86–89 Panama
    - Uruguay 64–74 **Puerto Rico**
      - Standings: Puerto Rico 6 points (3 games), **Argentina** 4 (2), Panama 3 (2), Paraguay 3 (3), Uruguay 2 (2).

==== Cricket ====
- Australia in Sri Lanka:
  - 1st Test in Galle, day 2: Australia 273 & 115/6 (33.5 overs); Sri Lanka 105 (50 overs; Nathan Lyon 5/34). Australia lead by 283 runs with 4 wickets remaining.
- Pakistan in Zimbabwe:
  - Only Test in Bulawayo, day 1: Zimbabwe 245/4 (90 overs); Pakistan.

==== Cycling ====
- Grand Tours:
  - Vuelta a España, Stage 12: (gold) Peter Sagan (SVK) (Liquigas–Cannondale) 4h 03' 01" (silver) John Degenkolb (GER) (HTC–Highroad) s.t. (bronze) Daniele Bennati (ITA) (Leopard Trek) s.t.
    - General classification (after stage 12): (1) Bradley Wiggins (GBR) (Team Sky) 46h 53' 47" (2) Chris Froome (GBR) (Team Sky) + 7" (3) Fredrik Kessiakoff (SWE) (Astana) + 9"

==== Football (soccer) ====
- 2012 Olympics Women's Asian Qualifiers Final Round in Jinan, China:
  - Japan 3–0 Thailand
  - China 1–0 South Korea
  - North Korea 0–0 Australia
- FIFA Beach Soccer World Cup in Ravenna, Italy:
  - Group A:
    - Switzerland 8–8 (0–1 pen.) Senegal
    - Italy 6–6 (5–4 pen.) Iran
  - Group B:
    - Argentina 3–1 Oman
    - El Salvador 2–11 Portugal
- Copa Sudamericana Second stage, first leg:
  - Argentinos Juniors (Argentina) 0–0 (Argentina) Vélez Sarsfield
  - Deportivo Anzoátegui (Venezuela) 1–2 (Peru) Universitario

==== Rowing ====
- World Championships in Lake Bled, Slovenia:
  - Men:
    - Lightweight coxless pairs (LM2-): (gold) Great Britain (Peter Chambers, Kieren Emery) 6:27.30 (silver) Italy (Luca De Maria, Armando Dell'Aquila) 6:28.59 (bronze) Germany (Bastian Seibt, Lars Wichert) 6:29.05
    - Eights (M8+): (gold) Germany (Gregor Hauffe, Andreas Kuffner, Eric Johannesen, Maximilian Reinelt, Richard Schmidt, Lukas Müller, Florian Mennigen, Kristof Wilke, Martin Sauer) 5:28.81 (silver) Great Britain (Nathaniel Reilly-O'Donnell, Cameron Nichol, James Foad, Alex Partridge, Moe Sbihi, Greg Searle, Tom Ransley, Daniel Ritchie, Phelan Hill) 5:30.83 (bronze) Canada (Gabriel Bergen, Andrew Byrnes, Jeremianh Brown, Douglas Csima, Malcolm Howard, Conlin McCabe, Robert Gibson, Will Crothers, Brian Price) 5:31.18
      - Germany win the event for the third successive time.
  - Women:
    - Coxless pairs (W2-): (gold) New Zealand (Juliette Haigh, Rebecca Scown) 6:58.16 (silver) Great Britain (Helen Glover, Heather Stanning) 6:58.24 (bronze) Australia (Sarah Tait, Kate Hornsey) 7:03.98
      - Haigh and Scown win the event for the second successive time.
    - Quadruple sculls (W4x): (gold) Germany (Julia Richter, Tina Manker, Stephanie Schiller, Britta Oppelt) 6:18.37 (silver) United States (Stesha Carle, Natalie Dell, Adrienne Martelli, Megan Kalmoe) 6:19.90 (bronze) New Zealand (Sarah Gray, Louise Trappitt, Fiona Bourke, Eve Macfarlane) 6:23.33
  - Adaptive:
    - Mixed coxed fours (IDMix4+): (gold) Hong Kong 3:51.08 (silver) Germany 4:01.12 (bronze) Italy 4:01.41
    - Women's single sculls (ASW1x): (gold) Alla Lysenko (UKR) 5:39.52 (silver) Nathalie Benoit (FRA) 5:41.39 (bronze) Moran Samuel (ISR) 5:49.97

==== Tennis ====
- Grand Slams:
  - US Open in New York City, United States, day 4:
    - Men's Singles, second round:
      - **Novak Djokovic** (SRB) [1] def. Carlos Berlocq (ARG) 6–0, 6–0, 6–2
      - **Roger Federer** (SUI) [3] def. Dudi Sela (ISR) 6–3, 6–2, 6–2
      - **Juan Carlos Ferrero** (ESP) def. Gaël Monfils (FRA) [7] 7–6(5), 5–7, 6–7(5), 6–4, 6–4
      - **Mardy Fish** (USA) [8] def. Malek Jaziri (TUN) 6–2, 6–2, 6–4
      - **Tomáš Berdych** (CZE) [9] def. Fabio Fognini (ITA) 7–5, 6–0, 6–0
    - Women's Singles, second round:
      - **Caroline Wozniacki** (DEN) [1] def. Arantxa Rus (NED) 6–2, 6–0
      - **Victoria Azarenka** (BLR) [4] def. Gisela Dulko (ARG) 6–4, 6–3
      - **Francesca Schiavone** (ITA) [7] def. Mirjana Lučić (CRO) 6–1, 6–1
      - **Andrea Petkovic** (GER) [10] def. Zheng Jie (CHN) 3–6, 6–3, 6–3

==== Volleyball ====
- Men's NORCECA Championship in Mayagüez, Puerto Rico:
  - Quarterfinals:
    - **Cuba** 3–0 Mexico
    - **Puerto Rico** 3–0 Trinidad and Tobago
