= Blair Tunevitsch =

Australian rower (born 1985)

Personal information
- Born: 28 September 1985 (age 40)
- Years active: 2007–2014

Sport
- Sport: Rowing
- Club: Tamar Rowing Club
Medal record
Men's rowing
Representing Australia
World Championships
Gold medal – first place	2011 Bled	Lwt eight
Silver medal – second place	2010 Karapiro	Lwt eight
Silver medal – second place	2010 Karapiro	Lwt four
Silver medal – second place	2013 Chungju	Lwt eight

Blair Tunevitsch (born 28 September 1985) is an Australian former lightweight rower – a five time national champion and world champion. He won a gold medal at the 2011 World Rowing Championships in Bled with the lightweight men's eight.

== Club and state rowing ==
Raised in Tasmania, Tunevitsch's senior club rowing was from the Tamar Rowing Club in Launceston. Much of his state and international career was in boats with his Tamar teammate Alister Foot.

From 2007 to 2013 Tunevitsch was selected to represent Tasmania in the men's lightweight four contesting the Penrith Cup at the Interstate Regatta within the Australian Rowing Championships. He was in the victorious Tasmanian fours of 2010, 2011 and 2012.

In 2009 and 2010 in Tamar colours and rowing in composite Tasmanian crews, Tunevitsch won the national lightweight eight championship title at the Australian Rowing Championships.

== International representative rowing ==
Tunevitsch was first selected to represent Australia at the 2006 World Rowing U23 Championships in Hazewinkel in a lightweight quad scull. They won the bronze medal. The following year at the 2007 World Rowing U23 Championships in Glasgow with only one crew change Tunevitsch again raced in the quad to a fourth placing.

In 2008 Tunevitsch was elevated to the Australian senior lightweight squad and he raced in the men's eight who placed eighth at the World Championships in Linz. In 2010 he was vying for a seat in both the lightweight eight and the lightweight four. He raced in the four at both Rowing World Cups II and III in Europe to respective fifth and seventh places. That year at the 2010 World Rowing Championships in Lake Karapiro he rowed in the Australian lightweight four with Anthony Edwards, Samuel Beltz and Todd Skipworth to a silver medal. It was a thrilling race finish where five crews crossed the line within half a boat length. The Australian four with Tunevitsch in the three seat finished 0.07 secs behind Great Britain and 0.01 secs ahead of China to claim his second silver medal of the regatta. He was the only member of that crew to double up in the eight which was stroked Perry Ward to another silver medal - Tunevitsch's second silver of the regatta.

The Australian lightweight eight stayed together into 2011 with the changeout of Perry Ward and Angus Tyers for Rod Chisolm and Tom Gibson and a move of Darryn Purcell into the stroke seat. At the 2011 World Championships in Bled they raced their final to perfection coming through the field from the 500mark, sitting second at the 1000 and the 1500, and running down the Italians in the last 200m to take the gold by 0.17seconds, winning Blair his first and only World Championship title. At that same regatta Tunevitsch stroked a lightweight coxless pair with Gibson at bow to a fifth place.

In 2012 at Rowing World Cups II and III in Lucerne and Munich Tunevitsch raced a coxless pair with Alister Foot to two bronze medal placings. Blair, Foot and Thomas Bertrand from the 2011 world champion eight stayed on and contested the lightweight eight at the 2012 World Rowing Championships in Plovdiv. The 2012 eight placed fifth.

Tunevitsch continued to represent Australia at the elite world level till 2014. He won a bronze medal at the 2013 World Rowing Cup I in Sydney in a lightweight four and also raced in the lightweight eight at that regatta. He represented Australia in two crews at the 2013 World Rowing Championships in Chungju placing tenth in the coxless four and second in the eight winning his fourth world championship medal – a silver. In 2014 he competed in the lightweight coxless four at the World Rowing Cup III in Lucerne and then at the 2014 World Championships. The four finished fifth in Tunevitsch's last Australian representative appearance.
