= Nicholas Baker (rower) =

Australian rower

Personal information
- Born: 13 February 1985 (age 41)

Sport
- Sport: Rowing
- Club: Lindisfarne Rowing Club
Medal record
Men's rowing
Representing Australia
World Championships
Gold medal – first place	2011 Bled	Lwt eight
Silver medal – second place	2010 Karapiro	Lwt eight

Nicholas Baker (born 13 February 1985) is an Australian world champion lightweight rower. He won a gold medal at the 2011 World Rowing Championships in Bled with the lightweight men's eight.

== Club and state rowing ==
Raised in Tasmania, Baker's senior club rowing was from the Lindisfarne Rowing Club in Hobart.

In 2008 Baker was selected to represent Tasmania in the men's lightweight four contesting the Penrith Cup at the Interstate Regatta within the Australian Rowing Championships. Such was the depth of Tasmanian lightweight rowing during Baker's peak years, that in 2010 and 2011 when he was in the Australian lightweight eight, he was unable to secure a seat in the Tasmanian state lightweight four.

In Lindisfarne club colours he contested the Australian men's lightweight pair title at the 2008 Australian Rowing Championships.

== International representative rowing ==
Baker was first selected to represent Australia at the 2007 World Rowing U23 Championships in Glasgow in a lightweight coxless pair which placed seventh. In 2008 he earned a seat in the Australian senior lightweight eight and raced at the 2008 World Rowing Championships in Linz to a seventh placing.

In 2010 at the World Championships in Lake Karapiro, Baker was seated at five in the Australian men's lightweight eight who placed second and won the silver medal.

The Australian lightweight eight stayed together into 2011 with the changeout of Perry Ward and Angus Tyers for Rod Chisolm and Tom Gibson and a move of Darryn Purcell into the stroke seat. At the 2011 World Championships in Bled they raced their final to perfection coming through the field from the 500mark, sitting second at the 1000 and the 1500, and running down the Italians in the last 200m to take the gold by 0.17seconds, winning Baker his first and only World Championship title.
