= Alister Foot =

Australian rower (born 1987)

Personal information
- Nickname: 12 inch
- Born: 15 June 1987 (age 39)
- Years active: 2003–2014

Sport
- Sport: Rowing
- Club: Tamar Rowing Club
Medal record
Men's rowing
Representing Australia
World Rowing Championships
Gold medal – first place	2011 Bled	Lwt eight
Silver medal – second place	2010 Karapiro	Lwt eight
Silver medal – second place	2013 Chungju	Lwt eight

Alister Foot (born 15 June 1987) is an Australian world champion lightweight rower. He won a gold medal at the 2011 World Rowing Championships in Bled in the lightweight men's eight.

== Club and state rowing ==
Raised in Tasmania, Foot's senior club rowing was from the Tamar Rowing Club in Launceston. Much of his state and international career was in boats with his Tamar teammate Blair Tunevitsch.

In 2009, 2013 and 2014 Foot was selected to represent Tasmania in the men's lightweight four contesting the Penrith Cup at the Interstate Regatta within the Australian Rowing Championships. Such was the depth of Tasmanian lightweight rowing during Foot's career, that from 2010 to 2012 when he was in the Australian lightweight eight, he was unable to secure a seat in the Tasmanian state lightweight four.

In 2009 and 2010 in Tamar colours and rowing in composite Tasmanian crews, Foot won the national lightweight eight championship title at the Australian Rowing Championships.

== International representative rowing ==
Foot was first selected to represent Australian at the 2008 World Rowing U23 Championships in Brandenburg where he raced in a lightweight quad scull to an overall 8th placing. The following year he stroked a lightweight double scull in front of Angus Moreton at the 2009 World Rowing U23 Championships in Racice. They placed fifteenth.

In 2010 at the World Championships in Lake Karapiro, Foot was seated at four in the Australian men's lightweight eight who placed second and won the silver medal. The lightweight eight stayed together into 2011 with the changeout of Perry Ward and Angus Tyers for Rod Chisolm and Tom Gibson and a move of Darryn Purcell into the stroke seat. At the 2011 World Championships in Bled they raced their final to perfection coming through the field from the 500mark, sitting second at the 1000 and the 1500, and running down the Italians in the last 200m to take the gold by 0.17seconds, winning Foot his first and only World Championship title.

In 2012 at Rowing World Cups II and III in Lucerne and Munich, Foot raced in a coxless pair with Blair Tunevitsch to two bronze medal placings. Foot, Tunevitsch and Thomas Bertrand from the 2011 world champion eight stayed on and contested the lightweight eight at the 2012 World Rowing Championships in Plovdiv. The 2012 eight placed fifth.

Foot continued to represent Australia at the elite world level till 2014. He won a bronze medal at the 2013 World Rowing Cup I in Sydney in a lightweight four and also raced in the lightweight eight at that regatta. He represented Australia in two crews at the 2013 World Rowing Championships in Chungju placing tenth in the coxless four and second in the eight winning his fourth world championship medal – a silver. In 2014 he competed in the lightweight coxless four at the World Rowing Cup I in Sydney and in a coxless pair at World Rowing Cup III in Lucerne and then at the 2014 World Championships. The pair finished sixth – Foot's last Australian representative appearance.
