= Lüke =

Lüke is a German language surname that stems from the male given name Ludwig. Notable people with the name include:

- Jan Lüke (1989), German lightweight rower
- Josef Lüke (1899–1948), German international footballer
