= Perry Ward =

Australian rower

Personal information
- Born: 9 December 1987 (age 38)

Sport
- Sport: Rowing
- Club: Swan River Rowing Club

Achievements and titles
- National finals: Penrith Cup 2006-2018
Medal record
Men's rowing
Representing Australia
World Rowing Championships
Silver medal – second place	2010 Karapiro	LM8+

Perry Ward (born 8 December 1987) is an Australian national representative lightweight rower. He rowed in Western Australia's state selection lightweight crew for thirteen consecutive years from 2006 to 2018, winning the national title on four occasions. He represented Australia at eight senior and U23 world championships, stroking every crew in which he was selected and winning a silver medal at the 2010 World Rowing Championships.

== Club and state rowing ==
Raised in Perth Western Australia, Ward's senior club rowing was with the Swan River Rowing Club.

Ward was first selected for West Australia in the men's lightweight four of 2006 to contest the Penrith Cup at the Interstate Regatta within the Australian Rowing Championships. That crew led for most of the race but were overhauled by the reigning champion Tasmanians in the last stage. However Ward, Ross Brown and Todd Skipworth returned in 2007 and that year ended the long Tasmanian run of dominance in the Penrith Cup. They went on to row together in two further victorious West Australian lightweight coxless fours in 2008 and 2009. Ward continued to represent for Western Australia in the Penrith Cup each year from 2010 to 2018, winning the event again in 2017. All told, Ward raced in thirteen consecutive West Australian lightweight coxless fours from 2006 t0 2018 and was victorious on four occasions and took the silver medal six times.

== International representative rowing ==
Ward first represented Australia at the 2006 World Rowing U23 Championships in Hazewinkel in a lightweight coxless pair which placed sixth. The following year at the 2007 World Rowing U23 Championships in Glasgow he rowed in the Australian lightweight quad scull to a fourth-place finish.

In 2008 he was elevated to the Australian senior lightweight squad and stepped into the stroke seat of the men's lightweight eight for the 2008 World Rowing Championships in Linz who finished in eight place. In 2009 he again contested the World Rowing U23 Championships, this time at stroke in the coxless four which finished in ninth place. In 2010 he was back in the senior squad and in contention for the Australian lightweight eight. That crew raced in coxless four combinations at the World Rowing Cups II and III in Europe. At the 2010 World Rowing Championships in Lake Karapiro they came together as an eight and with Ward at stroke they took the silver medal at those world championships.

In 2012 Ward held his seat setting the pace in the Australian men's lightweight eight when they rowed at the 2012 World Rowing Championships in Plovdiv to a fifth place. The following year Ward switched back into sculling boats. He rowed in the heavyweight quad scull at the World Rowing Cup I in Sydney and then at the 2013 World Rowing Championships in Chungju he stroked the lightweight quad to a fifth place. In 2014 at the WRC I in Sydney he raced a lightweight double scull with Adam Kachyckyj to a bronze medal, then at the WRC III in Lucerne with Adam de Carvalho to a disappointing seventeenth-place finish. For the 2014 World Rowing Championships that year in Amsterdam Ward was Australia's lightweight sculling entrant and he finished in fifth place.

Ward made it back into the Australian lightweight coxless four in 2015 and raced in that boat at the WRC II and III in Europe but a late injury just before the 2015 World Championships forced his withdrawal from the crew and Nicholas Silcox and Darryn Purcell were reassigned to race in a lightweight coxless pair. Ward did not make another national representative appearance.

== Rowing palmares ==
=== Australian Interstate Regatta ===
- 2006 Penrith Cup Western Australia LM4- bow seat - silver
- 2007 Penrith Cup Western Australia LM4- bow seat - gold
- 2008 Penrith Cup Western Australia LM4- bow seat - gold
- 2009 Penrith Cup Western Australia LM4- bow seat - gold
- 2010 Penrith Cup Western Australia LM4- bow seat - bronze
- 2011 Penrith Cup Western Australia LM4- two seat - silver
- 2012 Penrith Cup Western Australia LM4- two seat - silver
- 2013 Penrith Cup Western Australia LM4- stroke - 4th place
- 2014 Penrith Cup Western Australia LM4- three seat - silver
- 2015 Penrith Cup Western Australia LM4- three seat - silver
- 2016 Penrith Cup Western Australia LM4- three seat - silver
- 2017 Penrith Cup Western Australia LM4- three seat - gold
- 2018 Penrith Cup Western Australia LM4- two seat - 4th place

=== World Rowing Championships ===
- 2006 U23 World Championships BLM2- stroke - 6th place
- 2007 U23 World Championships BLM4x- stroke - 4th place
- 2008 World Rowing Championships LM8+ stroke - 8th place
- 2009 U23 World Championships BLM4- stroke - 9th place
- 2010 World Rowing Championships LM8+ stroke - silver
- 2012 World Rowing Championships LM8+ stroke - 5th place
- 2013 World Rowing Championships LM4x stroke - 5th place
- 2014 World Rowing Championships LM1x - 5th place
