= Thomas Bertrand =

Australian rower

Personal information
- Born: 9 July 1987 (age 38)

Sport
- Sport: Rowing
- Club: Mercantile Rowing Club
Medal record
Men's rowing
Representing Australia
World Rowing Championships
Gold medal – first place	2011 Bled	Lwt eight
Silver medal – second place	2010 Karapiro	Lwt eight

Thomas Bertrand (born 9 July 1987) is an Australian World Champion lightweight rower. He won a gold medal at the 2011 World Rowing Championships in Bled with the lightweight men's eight.

== Club and state rowing ==
Bertrand's senior rowing was from the Mercantile Rowing Club in Melbourne.

From 2007 to 2012 Bertrand was selected to represent Victoria in the men's lightweight four contesting the Penrith Cup at the Interstate Regatta within the Australian Rowing Championships.

In Mercantile colours he contested Australian national lightweight titles at the Australian Rowing Championships starting with the men's lightweight eight in 2007.

== International representative rowing ==
Bertrand first represented Australia at the 2007 World Rowing U23 Championships in Glasgow in a lightweight coxless four who placed ninth. At the U23 World Championships of 2008 in Brandenburg he raced in the Australian lightweight quad scull who finished sixth overall.

At the 2009 U23 World Championships in Racice he again rowed in the lightweight coxless four and again finished in ninth place. Bertrand also stepped up to the Australian senior lightweight squad in 2009 and competed at Poznan 2009 in the lightweight coxless four who finished fourteenth.

In 2010 at the World Championships in Lake Karapiro, Bertrand was seated at seven in the Australian men's lightweight eight who placed second and won the silver medal. The lightweight eight stayed together into 2011 with the changeout of Perry Ward and Angus Tyers for Rod Chisolm and Tom Gibson and a move of Darryn Purcell into the stroke seat. They raced their final to perfection coming through the field from the 500mark, sitting second at the 1000 and the 1500, and running down the Italians in the last 200m to take the gold by 0.17seconds, winning Bertrand his first World Championship title.

Bertrand and two other rowers from the 2011 world champion eight stayed on into 2012 and contested the 2012 World Championships in Plovdiv. The eight placed fifth. It was Bertrand's last Australian representative appearance.
