= Ben Cureton =

Australian former lightweight rower

Benjamin Cureton
Personal information
- Born: 11 February 1981 (age 45) Perth, Western Australia
- Years active: 1996–2012

Sport
- Country: Australia
- Sport: Rowing
- Club: Swan River Rowing Club
Medal record
Men's rowing
Representing Australia
Olympic Games
Silver medal – second place	2004 Athens	LM4-
World Rowing Championships
Gold medal – first place	2011 Bled	LM4-
Bronze medal – third place	2000 Zagreb	LM8+

Benjamin Cureton (born 11 February 1981 in Perth, Western Australia) is an Australian former lightweight rower. He was an eight-time national champion, a world champion and a three-time Olympian. He won his world championship in the men's lightweight fours, and an Olympic silver medal in that boat class in Athens 2004. He competed at two further Olympics in this discipline. For a twelve-year period from 2001 – excepting 2009 and 2010 – Cureton held his seat in all the Australian lightweight coxless fours selected to race at the premier world regattas.

== Club and state rowing ==
Cureton attended Trinity College, Perth where he took up rowing. His senior club rowing was from the Swan River Rowing Club in Perth.

From 1999 to 2004; 2006 to 2008 and 2011 to 2012 Cureton was selected to represent Western Australia in the men's lightweight four contesting the Penrith Cup at the Interstate Regatta within the Australian Rowing Championships. He was in the victorious West Australian fours of 2002, 2007, 2008 and stroked that crew in 2007.

Wearing Swan River Rowing Club colours he contested national lightweight titles at the Australian Rowing Championships from 1999. He competed in the lightweight coxless pair championship in 2005, 2006, 2007, 2008; the lightweight four in 2005, 2006, 2007, 2008; and the lightweight men's eight in 2005 and 2008. He won national titles in 2005 in the pair and the four; in 2006 in the pair; in 2007 in the four; and in 2008 in the pair.

== International representative rowing ==
Cureton was first selected to Australian representative rowing in a junior quad scull to compete at the World Junior Rowing Championships in Plovdiv, Bulgaria in 1999. They placed fourth.

In 2000 aged just nineteen he was elevated to the Australian senior lightweight squad and into the men's eight. They competed at the lightweight-only 2000 World Rowing Championships in Zagreb and won a bronze medal. The following year Cureton was vying for places in the men's lightweight eight and the coxless four. He competed in the four at World Rowing Cup IV that year in Munich, and for the 2001 World Championships in Lucerne he raced in the Australian coxless four to a ninth placing and in the eight who finished sixth overall.

In 2002 in a crew with the veteran Tasmanian lightweight Simon Burgess, Cureton raced in the coxless four at a World Rowing Cup in Munich and at the 2002 World Rowing Championships in Seville to a fourth placing.

For the Athens Olympics 2004 Cureton was selected in the Australian lightweight coxless four, along with Simon Burgess and Anthony Edwards who were both making their third Olympic appearances. They qualified through to the final where Danish favourites got away in the 1st 500m. Burgess at stroke and Cureton in the three seat brought the Australian four back into contention in the second and third 500 metres. However the Danes still had something in reserve in the rush home extending their lead to 1.4 seconds at the finish. The Australians won the Olympic silver.

Following his 2004 Olympic campaign Cureton was back in representative contention in 2006 and selected in the lightweight coxless four for two World Rowing Cups in Europe before the 2006 World Rowing Championships at Eton Dorney where the Australian four finished sixth. He was teamed in that crew with fellow West Australian Todd Skipworth with whom he would have a long representative partnership and success.

Cureton with Edwards, Skipworth and the addition of Rod Chisholm from New South Wales, stayed together in the Australian lightweight coxless four throughout 2007 and 2008. They raced at a 2007 World Rowing Cup and then at the 2007 World Rowing Championships in Munich to a seventh placing. Their lead-up to the 2008 Beijing Olympics included a third place at the World Rowing Cup III in Poznan and a seventh place at the WRC I. In Beijing the experienced lightweight foursome didn't figure in the medals in the tough Olympic conditions, they made the B final and finished in ninth place overall.

Cureton again took time off immediately after the 2008 Olympics and was back competing at the top level in 2010. He was a reserve for the Australian lightweight eight at the 2010 World Rowing Championships and competed in one event in that crew. He didn't gain a seat in either the eight or the four when they both won silver medal at those championships in Lake Karapiro. He did regain his seat in the four in 2011 and was a key part of their world championship success. They raced at the World Rowing Cup III in Lucerne to a fourth placing and then at the 2011 World Rowing Championships in Bled they staged a brilliant campaign. Second in their heat, they had to qualify for the final through a repechage and semi-final. In the final they rowed through the field from a fifth position at the 500m mark, to be 2nd at both the 1000 and 1500 and overtook the Italians in final run to take the gold medal with a 1.2 second margin. Cureton thus won his first senior world championship title, twelve years after first racing in Australian representative colours.

Their world champion status qualified the lightweight foursome for the 2012 London Olympics for which they prepared by racing at two World Rowing Cups in Europe. At the 2012 Olympic regatta they placed second in the heat, third in the semi-final and made the Olympic final, finishing in fourth place. Less than one and a quarter seconds separated the 1st to 4th crews. It was Cureton's and Skipworth's last Australian representative appearance and they both retired at point. Cureton and Skipworth had won six Australian national titles together in Swan River colours; raced for Western Australia together five times for two national championship wins and represented Australia in the same boat at two Olympics and three World Championships.
