= Samuel Beltz =

Australian rower (born 1980)

Personal information
- Born: 31 August 1980 (age 45) Hobart, Tasmania, Australia
- Years active: 1998–2014

Sport
- Country: Australia
- Sport: Rowing
- Club: Lindisfarne Rowing Club
Medal record
Men's rowing
Representing Australia
Gold medal – first place	2011 Lake Bled	LM4-
Silver medal – second place	2010 Karapiro	Lwt four
Silver medal – second place	2003 Lake Milan	LM4X
Bronze medal – third place	2004 Banyoles	LM8+

Samuel Beltz (born 31 August 1980) is an Australian former lightweight rower. He is a 16-time national champion, a world champion and dual Olympian. He competed at the 2008 and 2012 Summer Olympics and represented Australia at the premier world class regattas over a fifteen-year period from 1999 to 2014.

== State and club rowing ==
Beltz was educated at Friends' School, Hobart where he took up rowing. He won the national Schoolboy Scull title at the Australian Rowing Championships in 1998.

Beltz's senior club rowing was done from the Lindisfarne Rowing Club in Hobart, Tasmania.

From 2002 to 2010 Beltz was selected to represent Tasmania in the men's lightweight four contesting the Penrith Cup at the Interstate Regatta within the Australian Rowing Championships. He rowed in the five consecutive victories from 2002 to 2006 and then again in 2010, 2011, 2012. He also contested the event in 2007 and 2014.

Wearing Lindisfarne colours he contested national lightweight titles at the Australian Rowing Championships from 2005. He competed in the single scull in 2005, 2006, 2007; the double scull in 2005; the quad scull in 2005; lightweight coxless pair championship in 2007; the lightweight four in 2007 and 2008; and the lightweight men's eight in 2005, 2006 and 2010. He won national titles in 2005 (in the eight and in all three sculling boats); in 2006 in the eight; in 2007 in the lightweight pair and the four; in 2010 in the lightweight eight.

== International representative rowing ==
Beltz was first selected for Australia in an U23 quad scull in 1999. They raced at the World Rowing Cup III in Lucerne before competing at the 1999 World Rowing U23 Championships in Hamburg where they won bronze. Beltz and Josh Fricot of that U23 lightweight four remained in the crew into 2000 when they contested the World Rowing Cup III in Lucerne before finishing in seventh place at the 2000 U23 World Championships in Copenhagen.

Beltz moved into senior representative selection in sweep-oared boats in 2001. He raced with Alastair Isherwood in a lightweight coxless pair at the World Rowing Cup IV and then at the 2001 World Rowing Championships in Lucerne he finished in tenth place in the pair with Isherwood and in sixth place in the men's lightweight eight.

In 2003 he was back in sculling boats and selected at stroke in the Australian lightweight quad scull. They raced at the World Rowing Cup III to a third placing and then at the 2003 World Rowing Championships in Milan he stroked the quad to a silver world championship medal. 2004 saw Beltz selected in the Australian senior lightweight eight and he won a bronze medal at the 2004 World Rowing Championships in Banyoles. At Gifu, Japan 2005 he raced in the lightweight double scull with Cameron Wurf and finished in overall twelfth place.

In 2006 he rowed in the lightweight double scull at two World Rowing Cups in Europe before taking that double scull with Thomas Gibson to the 2006 World Rowing Championships at Eton Dorney for a fourth-place finish. Throughout 2007 and 2008 Beltz and Gibson stayed together in the lightweight double scull racing in each of those years at two World Rowing Cups in Europe before the 2007 World Championships (achieving fourth place) and then the 2008 Beijing Olympics where they finished tenth.

Beltz took time off after the Olympics but back in representative contention on 2010 and selected in the lightweight coxless four who contested two World Rowing Cups in Europe. At the 2010 World Rowing Championships in Lake Karapiro, Beltz rowed in the Australian lightweight four with Anthony Edwards, Blair Tunevitsch and Todd Skipworth to a silver medal. It was a thrilling race finish where five crews crossed the line within half a boat length. The Australian four with Beltz in the two seat finished 0.07 secs behind Great Britain and 0.01 secs ahead of China to claim his third world championship medal – a silver.

In 2011 that Australian lightweight four stayed together with Tunevitsch changed out for the West Australian Ben Cureton. At the 2011 World Rowing Championships in Bled they staged a brilliant campaign. Second in their heat, they had to qualify for the final through a repechage and a semi-final. In the final they rowed through the field from a fifth position at the 500m mark, to be 2nd at both the 1000 and 1500 and overtook the Italians in final run to take the gold medal with a 1.2 second margin. Beltz thus won his first senior world championship title, twelve years after first racing in Australian representative colours.

Their world champion status qualified the lightweight foursome for the 2012 London Olympics for which they prepared by racing at two World Rowing Cups in Europe. At the 2012 Olympic regatta they placed second in the heat, third in the semi-final and made the Olympic final, finishing in fourth place. Beltz was back again to represent Australia at the elite level in 2014. He competed in the lightweight coxless four at the World Rowing Cup III in Lucerne and then at the 2014 World Championships. In Beltz's last Australian representative appearance the four finished fifth.
