= Luca De Maria =

Italian rower

Personal information
- Born: 18 June 1989 (age 37) Naples, Italy
Medal record
Men's rowing
Representing Italy
World Championships
Gold medal – first place	2012 Plovdiv	LM2-
Silver medal – second place	2011 Bled	LM2-
Silver medal – second place	2014 Amsterdam	LM8+
Bronze medal – third place	2010 Karapiro	LM8+

Luca De Maria (born 18 June 1989) is an Italian rower.
