= Nicholas Silcox =

Australian rower (born 1989)

Personal information
- Born: 11 July 1989 (age 36)

Sport
- Sport: Rowing
- Club: Toowong Rowing Club

Achievements and titles
- National finals: Penrith Cup 2011-2016
Medal record
Men's rowing
Representing Australia
World Rowing Championships
| Silver medal – second place | 2013 Chungju | LM8+ |

Nicholas Silcox (born 11 July 1989) is an Australian former national representative lightweight rower. He won a silver medal at the 2013 World Rowing Championships.

== Club and state rowing ==
Raised in Bundaberg, Queensland, Silcox's senior club rowing was with the Toowong Rowing Club in Brisbane.

In 2011 he was first selected in a Queensland lightweight coxless four to contest the Penrith Cup at the Interstate Regatta. He rowed in six consecutive Queensland Penrith Cup fours from 2011 to 2016 and enjoyed four victories between 2013 and 2016, the final one at stroke.

From 2008 to 2010 he contested the men's lightweight eight title at the Australian Rowing Championships in Toowong Rowing Club colours.

== International representative rowing ==
Silcox first represented Australia at the 2011 World Rowing U23 Championships in Amsterdam in a lightweight coxless four which placed eighth. For the 2012 World Rowing Championships in Plovdiv he stepped up to the Australian senior squad and rowed the lightweight eight when they achieved a fifth place finish.

At the 2013 World Rowing Cup I in Sydney, two Australian development eights raced the men's eight event, one a lightweight crew had Silcox in the three seat and they finished fifth. That eight also split down and contested the lightweight coxless four event. At the 2013 World Rowing Championships in Chungju, Silcox was seated in the Australian men's lightweight eight when it took the silver medal. Silcox also doubled up in the lightweight coxless four which finished in overall tenth place.

In 2014 Silcox maintained a seat in Australia's lightweight coxless four. He rowed in that boat in the open coxless four event at the World Rowing Cup I and then in the lightweight event at WRC II. As the only non Tasmanian in that boat at the 2014 World Rowing Championships in Amsterdam, Silcox rowed in the bow seat with that crew to a fifth place. He held his seat in the lightweight coxless four into 2015 and rowed in that boat at two World Rowing Cups in Europe but when Perry Ward had to make a late withdrawal from the crew due to injury just before the 2015 World Rowing Championships Silcox and Darryn Purcell were reassigned to race in a lightweight coxless pair. They finished in sixth place. It was Silcox's last national representative appearance.
