= Davide Riccardi (rower) =

Italian rower

Personal information
- Born: 18 July 1986 (age 39)

Sport
- Sport: Rowing
Medal record
Men's rowing
Representing Italy
World Rowing Championships
Gold medal – first place	2009 Poznań	Lwt eight
Silver medal – second place	2011 Bled	Lwt eight
Silver medal – second place	2012 Plovdiv	Lwt eight
Bronze medal – third place	2010 Karapiro	Lwt eight

Davide Riccardi (born 18 July 1986) is an Italian lightweight rower. He won a gold medal at the 2009 World Rowing Championships in Poznań with the lightweight men's eight.
