= Kelsie Gibson =

British rower (born 1993)

Personal information
- Born: 17 July 1993 (age 32) Maidstone, Great Britain

Sport
- Sport: Adaptive rowing
- Club: Maidstone Invicta Rowing Club
Medal record
Representing Great Britain
World Rowing Championships
Silver medal – second place	2010 Karapiro	Mixed coxed four

Kelsie Gibson (born 17 July 1993) is a British former rower who competed at international rowing competitions. She is a World silver medalist in the mixed coxed four.
