= David Webster (rowing) =

Australian rowing coxswain (born 1987)

Personal information
- Born: 11 September 1987 (age 38) Melbourne, Australia

Sport
- Club: Melbourne Uni Boat Club
Medal record
Men's rowing
Representing Australia
World Rowing Championships
Gold medal – first place	2010 Karapiro	M2+
Gold medal – first place	2011 Bled	LM8+
Silver medal – second place	2010 Karapiro	LM8+
Silver medal – second place	2011 Lake Bled	M2+

David Webster (born 11 September 1987 in East Melbourne) is an Australian national champion rowing coxswain who steered Australian crews at six World Rowing Championships and won two world championship titles in 2010 and 2011.

== Club and state rowing ==
Webster was educated at Melbourne Grammar School where he took up rowing. His senior rowing was done from the Melbourne University Boat Club.

From 2011 to 2016 Webster was selected to represent Victoria in the senior men's eight contesting the King's Cup at the Interstate Regatta within the Australian Rowing Championships. He steered the Victorian eight to King's cup victories in 2015 and 2016 and his in-boat call of the 2016 victory can be heard here.

== International representative rowing ==
Webster's Australian representative debut was as cox of the men's eight selected to compete at the 2009 World Rowing U23 Championships in Racice. That crew placed fourth.

In 2010, Webster's first year in senior representative Australian crews, he experienced World Championship success at Lake Karapiro 2010 in the stern of the lightweight Australian men's eight – a silver medal – and in the bow of a heavyweight coxed pair rowed by Chris Morgan and Dominic Grimm to a gold medal and their first World Championship title. The following year at Bled 2011 Webster coxed both those same Australian boats but the results were reversed. The Australian men's lightweight eight with six rowers returning from 2010 raced their final to perfection coming through the field from the 500mark, sitting second at the 1000 and the 1500, and running down the Italians in the last 200m to take the gold by 0.17seconds, winning Webster his second World Championship title. Webster recorded and published his victorious race call in the LM8+. The pair containing Webster's Victorian King's Cup teammates Will Lockwood and James Chapman led at all three marks but were pipped in the run to the finish by an Italian pair winning Webster in the bow his second silver World Championship medal.

Webster and half the rowing members of the 2011 World Champion LM8+ were again selected (with four new members up the bow end) to race for Australia at the 2012 World Rowing Championships in Plovdiv, Bulgaria. They placed fifth.

Webster's chief Australian coxing competitor – his New South Wales rival Toby Lister – retired from international representation in 2013 and Webster picked up the ropes of the Australian men's senior eight at that point. Being the first year of a new Olympiad the eight was full of new faces and raced at the World Rowing Cup I of 2013 in Sydney and at the 2013 World Rowing Championships in Chungju where they failed to make the A final and finished seventh overall.

The 2014 World Rowing Cup I was in Sydney early in 2014, a number of experienced Australian seniors had returned to the eight and with Webster in the stern they won at that regatta. A second developmental Australian eight raced in that WRC I final in Sydney and it was steered by Webster's younger brother Timothy Webster. Tim Webster also coxed at Melbourne Uni Boat Club, earned a scholarship like David to the Victorian Institute of Sport, and was in the Australian senior squad with David in 2013 and 2014. In the Australian senior eight David Webster placed sixth at the World Rowing Cup II in Lucerne a few months later in 2014 and at the 2014 World Championships in Amsterdam they placed seventh overall.

Webster's last national selection was in 2015. He coxed the Australian men's eight at the World Rowing Cup III in Lucerne and at the Olympic qualifications the 2015 World Rowing Championships in Aiguebelette, France. They finished ninth overall and did not qualify for the 2016 Summer Olympics via this regatta. Webster again coxed the Victorian King's Cup eight in 2016 but when a selected Australian men's senior eight made a last ditch Olympic qualification attempt in May 2016 at Lucerne, the US-based Australian cox Stuart Sim was on the rudder.

== Accolades ==
Webster was selected as captain of the national Australian rowing squad in 2013. He won a Victoria University High Performance Sport Scholarship in 2013 and was named as Victoria University's Male Sports Person of the Year in 2013. He studied a B. Sport and Recreation Management at VU.
