= Peta White =

Australian rower

Personal information
- Born: 1 October 1991 (age 34)

Sport
- Country: Australia
- Sport: Rowing
- Club: Torrens Rowing Club
Medal record
Women's rowing
Representing Australia
World Rowing Championships
Silver medal – second place	2011 Bled	W4-
World Rowing U23 Championships
Silver medal – second place	2010 Brest	BW4-
Junior World Rowing Championships
Gold medal – first place	2009 Paris	JW4-

Peta White (born 1 Oct 1991) is a former Australian representative rower. She was a junior world champion and won silver medals at U23 and senior World Rowing Championships.

== Club and state rowing ==
White's senior club rowing was from the Adelaide University Boat Club in Adelaide.

White first made state selection for South Australia still aged sixteen in the youth eight who finished last in the race for the Bicentennial Cup at the 2008 Interstate Regatta within the Australian Rowing Championships. She rowed again in South Australian youth eights in 2009 (third place), 2010 (fourth place) and 2011 (second place).

In 2013 and 2014 she made the South Australian senior women's eight competing for the Queen's Cup at the Interstate Regatta.

== International representative rowing ==
White made her Australian representative debut aged eighteen at the 2009 Junior World Rowing Championships in Paris where she raced in a coxless four to a junior world championship gold medal. In 2010 White was selected in a coxless four which contested the World Rowing U23 Championships in Brest and rowed to a silver medal.

In 2011 White rowed at the World Rowing U23 Championships in Amsterdam and at the 2011 World Rowing Championships in Bled in two different Australian coxless fours. In Amsterdam the U23 four placed fourth but at the World Championships in Bled with Renee Chatterton, Pauline Frasca and Kate Hornsey in the coxless four, White brought home a silver medal.

In 2013 White again double up at both World Rowing U23 Championships and the 2013 World Rowing Championships this time in the women's eight. The U23 eight finished in fourth place in Linz and the senior eight, with White in the three seat in Chungju finished in fifth place overall. It was White's final Australian representative appearance.

Since retirement from competitive rowing, White has commenced full-time work and is affectionately known by her colleagues as "Swift Justice".
