= Laura Comeau =

Canadian rower (born 1983)

Personal information
- Born: 20 March 1983 (age 43) St. Catharines, Ontario, Canada

Sport
- Sport: Rowing
- Club: Miami Hurricanes
Medal record
Representing Canada
World Championships
Gold medal – first place	2010 Karapiro	Mixed coxed four
Silver medal – second place	2011 Bled	Mixed coxed four
Bronze medal – third place	2007 Munich	Mixed coxed four

Laura Comeau (born 20 March 1983) is a Canadian former rower who was a coxswain for the Canadian mixed coxed fours team who won three medals at the World Rowing Championships, she has also competed at the 2008 Summer Paralympics but did not medal.
