= Alexandre Pilat =

French rower

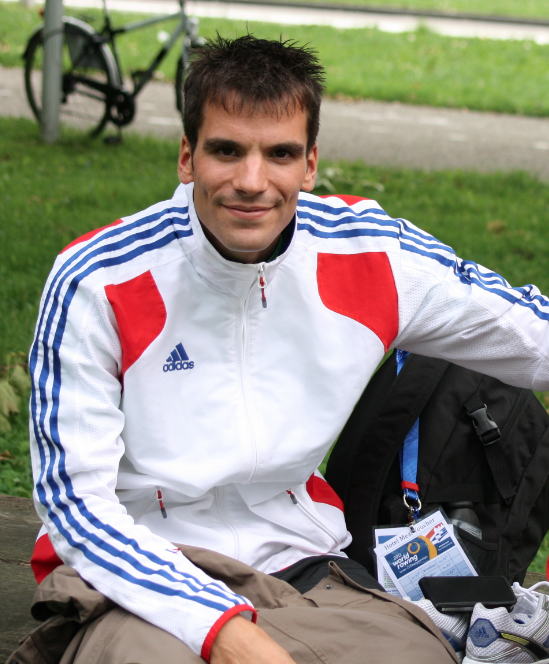

Personal information
- Born: 20 April 1989 (age 37) Saint-Priest-en-Jarez, Loire
Medal record
Men's rowing
Representing France
World Rowing Championships
Silver medal – second place	2010 Karapiro	LM4x

Alexandre Pilat (born 20 April 1989 in Saint-Priest-en-Jarez, Loire) is a French rower.
