= Albert Kowert =

German rowing cox

Personal information
- Born: 28 December 1989 (age 36)

Sport
- Sport: Rowing
Medal record
Men's rowing
Representing Germany
World Rowing Championships
Gold medal – first place	2010 Karapiro	Lwt eight

Albert Kowert (born 28 December 1989) is a German coxswain. He won a gold medal at the 2010 World Rowing Championships in Karapiro with the lightweight men's eight.
