= Christian Nielsen (rower) =

Danish rower (born 1988)

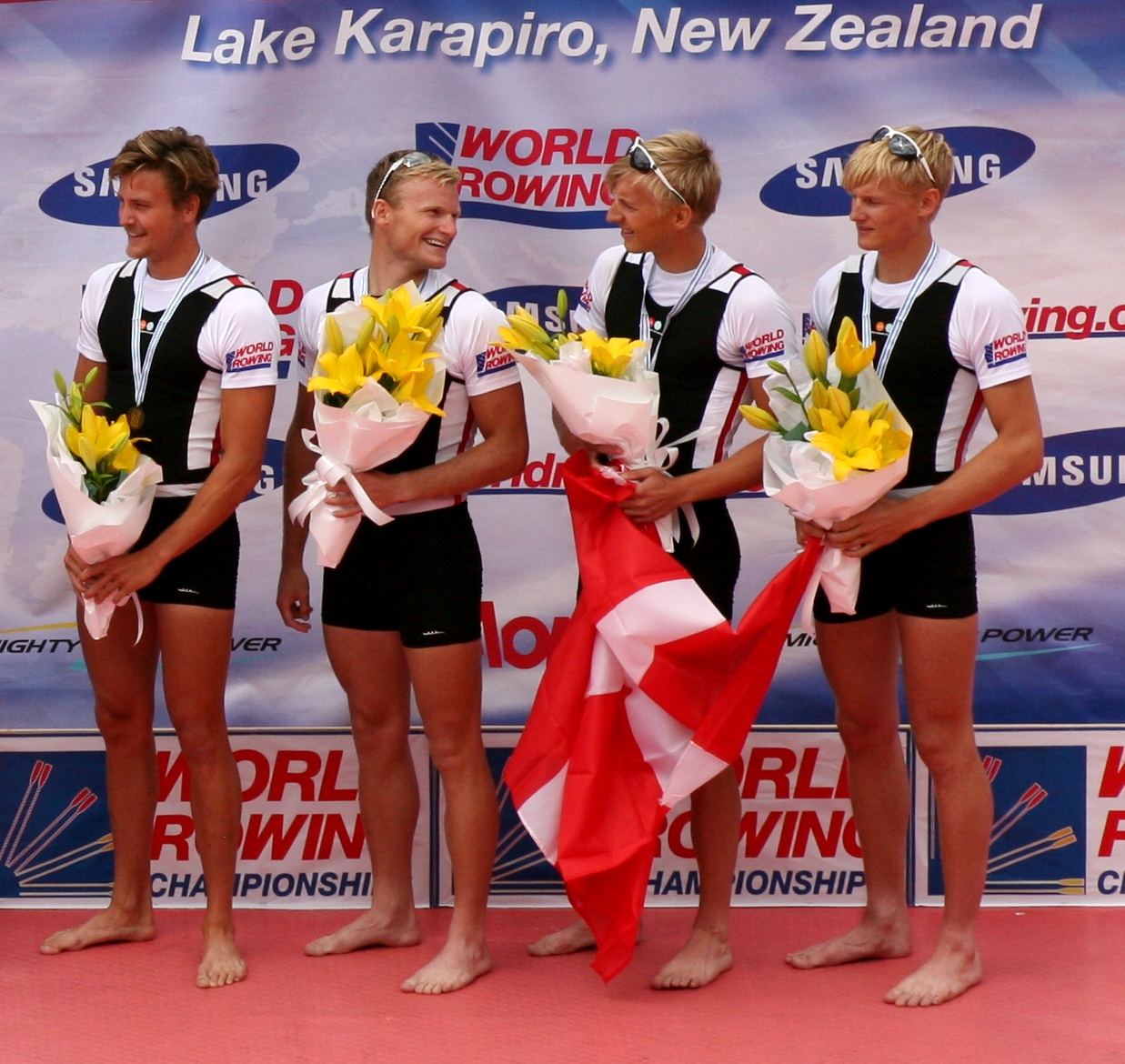
- Nielsen (second from left) at the 2010 World Rowing Championships.

Personal information
- Born: 2 August 1988 (age 37) Randers, Denmark
Medal record
Men's rowing
Representing Denmark
World Rowing Championships
| Bronze medal – third place | 2009 Poznań | LM4x |
| Bronze medal – third place | 2010 Karapiro | LM4x |
| Bronze medal – third place | 2011 Bled | LM4x |

Christian Nielsen (born 2 August 1988 in Randers) is a Danish rower.
