= Marcello Miani =

Italian rower

Medal record

Men's rowing

Representing Italy

World Championships
Gold medal – first place	2004 Banyoles	LM4x
Gold medal – first place	2010 Cambridge	LM1x
Gold medal – first place	2014 Amsterdam	LM1x
Silver medal – second place	2006 Dorney	LM2x
Silver medal – second place	2011 Bled	LM4-
Bronze medal – third place	2009 Poznań	LM2x

European Championships
Silver medal – second place	2014 Belgrade	LM1x

Marcello Miani (born 5 March 1984 in Faenza) is an Italian rower.
