= Angus Tyers =

Personal information
- Born: 9 November 1987 (age 38)

Sport
- Country: Australia
- Sport: Rowing
- Club: Melbourne Uni Boat Club
Medal record
Men's rowing
Representing Australia
World Rowing Championships
Silver medal – second place	2010 Lake Karapiro	LM8+

Angus Tyers (born 9 November 1987) is an Australian former representative lightweight rower, who won a silver medal at the 2010 World Rowing Championships. In 2021 Angus became a father, with his partner Elizabeth, to Ted Tyers.

== Club and state rowing ==
Tyers was raised in Melbourne, and his senior club rowing was from the Melbourne University Boat Club.

He first made state selection for Victoria in 2006 in the men's youth eight which contested the Noel F Wilkinson Trophy at the Interstate Regatta within the Australian Rowing Championships. He rowed again in the Victorian youth eight in 2007 this time at stroke. In 2008 he was selected at stroke in the Victorian lightweight four to contest the Penrith Cup at the Interstate Regatta. He made further Penrith Cup appearances for Victorian in 2009 and 2010, stroking all three Victorian lightweight fours in which he raced.

In 2007 at the Australian University Championships and wearing Monash University colours he won the lightweight single sculls title. He defended that title in 2008.

== International representative rowing ==
Tyers made his Australian representative debut in 2008 at the World Rowing U23 Championships in Brandenburg World in a lightweight quad scull. They rowed to eighth place. The following year he was elevated to the Australian senior lightweight squad and rowed in a coxless four at the 2009 World Rowing Championships in Poznan finishing in fourteenth place.

In 2010 he was in contention for the Australian lightweight eight. That crew raced in coxless four combinations at the World Rowing Cups II and III in Europe with Tyers stroking one of those fours to an eleventh place in Munich. At the 2010 World Rowing Championships in Lake Karapiro they came together as an eight and with Tyers in the two seat, they took the silver medal at those world championships.
