= David Blair (rower) =

Canadian adaptive rower (born 1991)

Personal information
- Born: 15 October 1991 (age 34)
- Education: Carleton University

Sport
- Country: Canada
- Sport: Pararowing; Paratriathlon
Medal record
Representing Canada
Pararowing
World Championships
Gold medal – first place	2010 Cambridge	LTAMix4+
Silver medal – second place	2011 Bled	LTAMix4+
Paratriathlon
ITU World Championships
Silver medal – second place	2014 Chicago	Men's PT5

David Blair (born October 15, 1991) is a Canadian pararower and paratriathlete who competes in international-level events. He represented Canada at the 2012 Summer Paralympics in the mixed coxed four, and is a world champion in the event. Born with albinism, Blair's vision started poor and slowly deteriorated.
