= Daniel Wisgott =

German rower (born 1988)

Medal record

Men's rowing

Representing Germany

World Championships
Gold medal – first place	2010 Karapiro	LM8+
Gold medal – first place	2014 Amsterdam	LM8+

Daniel Wisgott (born 13 February 1988, in Essen) is a German rower.
