= Liu Jing (rower) =

Chinese rower

Medal record

Women's rowing

Representing China

World Rowing Championships
Gold medal – first place	2006 Eton	LW4x
Silver medal – second place	2011 Bled	LW4x
Bronze medal – third place	2007 Munich	LW4x
Bronze medal – third place	2010 Karapiro	LW4x

Asian Games
Gold medal – first place	2010 Guangzhou	LW4x

Liu Jing (Chinese: 刘憬; born 11 December 1987 in Shandong) is a Chinese rower.
