= Steffen Jensen =

Danish rower

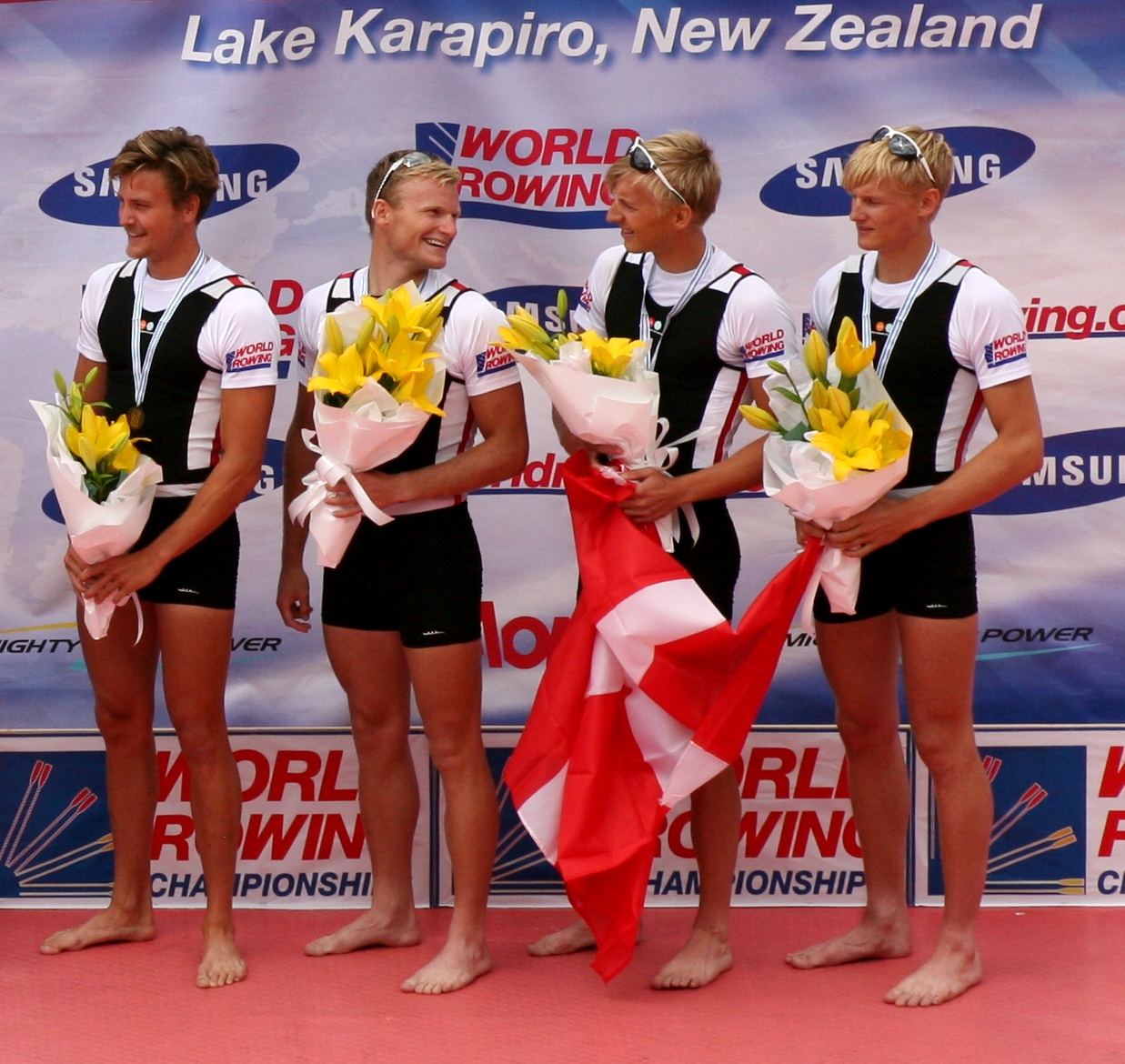
- Nielsen (left) at the 2010 World Rowing Championships.

Personal information
- Born: 5 December 1989 (age 36) Randers, Denmark
Medal record
Men's rowing
Representing Denmark
World Rowing Championships
Bronze medal – third place	2010 Karapiro	LM4x
Bronze medal – third place	2011 Bled	LM4x

Steffen Jensen (born 5 December 1989 in Odder) is a Danish rower.
