= 2011 World Rowing Championships =

International rowing event

- Venue: Lake Bled
- Location: Bled, Slovenia
- Dates: 28 August to 4 September

The 2011 World Rowing Championships were World Rowing Championships that were held from 28 August to 4 September 2011 at Lake Bled, adjoining the Slovenian city of Bled. The annual week-long rowing regatta is organized by World Rowing Federation (FISA), and held at the end of the northern hemisphere summer. In non-Olympic Games years the regatta is the highlight of the international rowing calendar, and in the year prior to the Olympics it is the main qualification event for the following year's Olympics.

== Medal summary ==
=== Men's events ===
Non-Olympic classes

Event	Gold	Time	Silver	Time	Bronze	Time
M1x	New Zealand; Mahé Drysdale	6:39.56	Czech Republic; Ondřej Synek	6:40.05	Great Britain; Alan Campbell	6:44.86
M2x	New Zealand; Nathan Cohen; Joseph Sullivan	6:10.76	Germany; Hans Gruhne; Stephan Krüger	6:10.82	France; Cédric Berrest; Julien Bahain	6:14.31
M4x	Australia; Chris Morgan; James McRae; Karsten Forsterling; Daniel Noonan	5:39.31	Germany; Karl Schulze; Philipp Wende; Lauritz Schoof; Tim Grohmann	5:39.56	Croatia; David Šain; Martin Sinković; Damir Martin; Valent Sinković	5:42.82
M2-	New Zealand; Eric Murray; Hamish Bond	6:14.77	Great Britain; Pete Reed; Andrew Triggs Hodge	6:16.27	Italy; Niccolò Mornati; Lorenzo Carboncini	6:21.33
M4-	Great Britain; Matt Langridge; Richard Egington; Tom James; Alex Gregory	5:55.18	Greece; Stergios Papachristos; Ioannis Tsilis; Georgios Tziallas; Ioannis Christou	5:57.20	Australia; Samuel Loch; Drew Ginn; Nicholas Purnell; Josh Dunkley-Smith	5:58.44
M2+	Italy; Vincenzo Capelli; Pierpaolo Frattini; Niccolò Fanchi	6:56.45	Australia; Will Lockwood; James Chapman; David Webster	6:58.20	Canada; Kevin Light; Steven Van Knotsenburg; Brian Price	7:00.76
M8+	Germany; Gregor Hauffe; Andreas Kuffner; Eric Johannesen; Maximilian Reinelt; Richard Schmidt; Lukas Müller; Florian Mennigen; Kristof Wilke; Martin Sauer	5:28.81	Great Britain; Nathaniel Reilly-O'Donnell; Cameron Nichol; James Foad; Alex Partridge; Moe Sbihi; Greg Searle; Tom Ransley; Daniel Ritchie; Phelan Hill	5:30.83	Canada; Gabriel Bergen; Andrew Byrnes; Jeremiah Brown; Douglas Csima; Malcolm Howard; Conlin McCabe; Robert Gibson; Will Crothers; Brian Price	5:31.18
Men's lightweight events
LM1x	Denmark; Henrik Stephansen	6:54.73	Italy; Pietro Ruta	7:01.54	New Zealand; Duncan Grant	7:03.30
LM2x	Great Britain; Zac Purchase; Mark Hunter	6:18.67	New Zealand; Storm Uru; Peter Taylor	6:19.01	Italy; Lorenzo Bertini; Elia Luini	6:21.33
LM4x	Italy; Francesco Rigon; Daniele Gilardoni; Franco Sancassani; Stefano Basalini	6:00.95	Germany; Michael Wieler; Stefan Wallat; Jonas Schützeberg; Ingo Voigt	6:01.08	Denmark; Steffen Jensen; Martin Batenburg; Christian Nielsen; Hans Christian Sørensen	6:02.81
LM2-	Great Britain; Peter Chambers; Kieren Emery	6:27.30	Italy; Luca De Maria; Armando Dell'Aquila	6:28.59	Germany; Bastian Seibt; Lars Wichert	6:29.05
LM4-	Australia; Anthony Edwards; Samuel Beltz; Ben Cureton; Todd Skipworth	5:55.10	Italy; Daniele Danesin; Andrea Caianiello; Marcello Miani; Martino Goretti	5:56.33	Great Britain; Richard Chambers; Chris Bartley; Paul Mattick; Rob Williams	5:57.33
LM8+	Australia; Thomas Bertrand; Ross Brown; Blair Tunevitsch; Thomas Gibson; Alister Foot; Roderick Chisholm; Nicholas Baker; Darryn Purcell; David Webster	5:44.57	Italy; Luigi Scala; Fabrizio Gabriele; Davide Riccardi; Gianluca Santi; Livio La Padula; Catello Amarante; Jiri Vlcek; Giorgio Tuccinardi; Gianluca Barattolo	5:44.73	Denmark; Lasse Dittmann; Daniel Graff; Anders Hansen; Jens Vilhelmsen; Thorbjørn Patscheider; Jacob Larsen; Christian Pedersen; Martin Kristensen; Emil Blach	5:46.75

=== Women's events ===
Non-Olympic classes

Event	Gold	Time	Silver	Time	Bronze	Time
W1x	Czech Republic; Miroslava Knapková	7:26.64	Belarus; Ekaterina Karsten	7:28.68	New Zealand; Emma Twigg	7:30.68
W2x	Great Britain; Anna Watkins; Katherine Grainger	6:44.73	Australia; Kerry Hore; Kim Crow	6:45.98	New Zealand; Fiona Paterson; Anna Reymer	6:46.74
W4x	Germany; Julia Richter; Tina Manker; Stephanie Schiller; Britta Oppelt	6:18.37	United States; Stesha Carle; Natalie Dell; Adrienne Martelli; Megan Kalmoe	6:19.90	New Zealand; Sarah Gray; Louise Trappitt; Fiona Bourke; Eve MacFarlane	6:23.33
W2-	New Zealand; Juliette Haigh; Rebecca Scown	6:58.16	Great Britain; Helen Glover; Heather Stanning	6:58.24	Australia; Sarah Tait; Kate Hornsey	7:03.98
W4-	United States; Sarah Zelenka; Kara Kohler; Emily Regan; Sara Hendershot	6:30.30	Australia; Peta White; Renee Chatterton; Pauline Frasca; Kate Hornsey	6:31.18	Netherlands; Wianka van Dorp; Olivia van Rooijen; Ellen Hogerwerf; Femke Dekker	6:34.06
W8+	United States; Esther Lofgren; Susan Francia; Meghan Musnicki; Taylor Ritzel; Jamie Redman; Amanda Polk; Caroline Lind; Elle Logan; Mary Whipple	6:03.65	Canada; Janine Hanson; Rachelle Viinberg; Natalie Mastracci; Cristy Nurse; Krista Guloien; Ashley Brzozowicz; Darcy Marquardt; Andréanne Morin; Lesley Thompson	6:04.39	Great Britain; Alison Knowles; Jo Cook; Jessica Eddie; Louisa Reeve; Natasha Page; Lindsey Maguire; Katie Greves; Victoria Thornley; Caroline O'Connor	6:06.03
Women's lightweight events
LW1x	Brazil; Fabiana Beltrame	7:44.58	Switzerland; Pamela Weisshaupt	7:48.24	Germany; Lena Müller	7:50.44
LW2x	Greece; Christina Giazitzidou; Alexandra Tsiavou	6:59.80	Canada; Lindsay Jennerich; Patricia Obee	7:03.46	Great Britain; Hester Goodsell; Sophie Hosking	7:04.33
LW4x	Great Britain; Stephanie Cullen; Imogen Walsh; Kathryn Twyman; Andrea Dennis	6:28.14	China; Pan Dandan; Tang Chanjuan; Liu Jing; Yan Xiaohua	6:30.41	United States; Hillary Saeger; Nicole Dinion; Lindsey Hochman; Katherine Robinson	6:33.91

=== Adaptive events ===
Non-Paralympic class

Event	Gold	Time	Silver	Time	Bronze	Time
ASW1x	Ukraine; Alla Lysenko	5:39.52	France; Nathalie Benoit	5:41.39	Israel; Moran Samuel	5:49.97
ASM1x	Great Britain; Tom Aggar	4:58.01	Russia; Alexey Chuvashev	5:00.09	Australia; Erik Horrie	5:04.75
TAMix2x	China; Lou Xiaoxian; Fei Tianming	4:01.81	France; Perle Bouge; Stephane Tardieu	4:02.98	Australia; John Maclean; Kathryn Ross	4:05.13
IDMix4+	Hong Kong; Wang Sin Liu; King Shan Lam; Tung Chun Szeto; Kwok Man Tsui; Tsz Wai Chan	3:51.08	Germany; Clara von der Gruen; Paula Hamann; Fabian Neitzel; Maximilian Kunze; Florian Schaefer	4:01.12	Italy; Giorgia Indelicato; Elisabetta Tieghi; Luca Varesano; Francesco Borsani; Federico Zoppi	4:01.41
LTAMix4+	Great Britain; Pam Relph; Naomi Riches; David Smith; James Roe; Lily van den Broecke	3:27.10	Canada; Anthony Theriault; David Blair; Victoria Nolan; Meghan Montgomery; Laura Comeau	3:31.84	Germany; Anke Molkenthin; Christiane Quirin; Martin Lossau; Michael Schulz; Katrin Splitt	3:33.27

== Medal table ==
=== Men's & women's events ===
Place	Nation	1st place, gold medalist(s)	2nd place, silver medalist(s)	3rd place, bronze medalist(s)	Total
1	Great Britain	5	3	4	12
2	New Zealand	4	1	4	9
3	Australia	3	3	2	8
4	Italy	2	4	2	8
5	Germany	2	3	2	7
6	United States	2	1	1	4
7	Czech Republic	1	1	0	2
7	Greece	1	1	0	2
9	Denmark	1	0	2	3
10	Brazil	1	0	0	1
11	Canada	0	2	2	4
12	Belarus	0	1	0	1
12	China	0	1	0	1
12	Switzerland	0	1	0	1
15	Croatia	0	0	1	1
15	France	0	0	1	1
15	Netherlands	0	0	1	1
Total		22	22	22	66

=== Adaptive events ===
Place	Nation	1st place, gold medalist(s)	2nd place, silver medalist(s)	3rd place, bronze medalist(s)	Total
1	Great Britain	2	0	0	2
2	China	1	0	0	1
2	Hong Kong	1	0	0	1
2	Ukraine	1	0	0	1
5	France	0	2	0	2
6	Germany	0	1	1	2
7	Canada	0	1	0	1
7	Russia	0	1	0	1
9	Australia	0	0	2	2
10	Israel	0	0	1	1
10	Italy	0	0	1	1
Total		5	5	5	15
