= Robby Gerhardt =

German rower (born 1987)

Medal record

Men's rowing

Representing Germany

World Rowing Championships
Gold medal – first place	2010 Karapiro	LM8+

Robby Gerhardt (born 10 April 1987 in Großröhrsdorf, Bezirk Dresden, East Germany) is a German rower.
