= James Chapman (rower) =

Australian rower (born 1979)

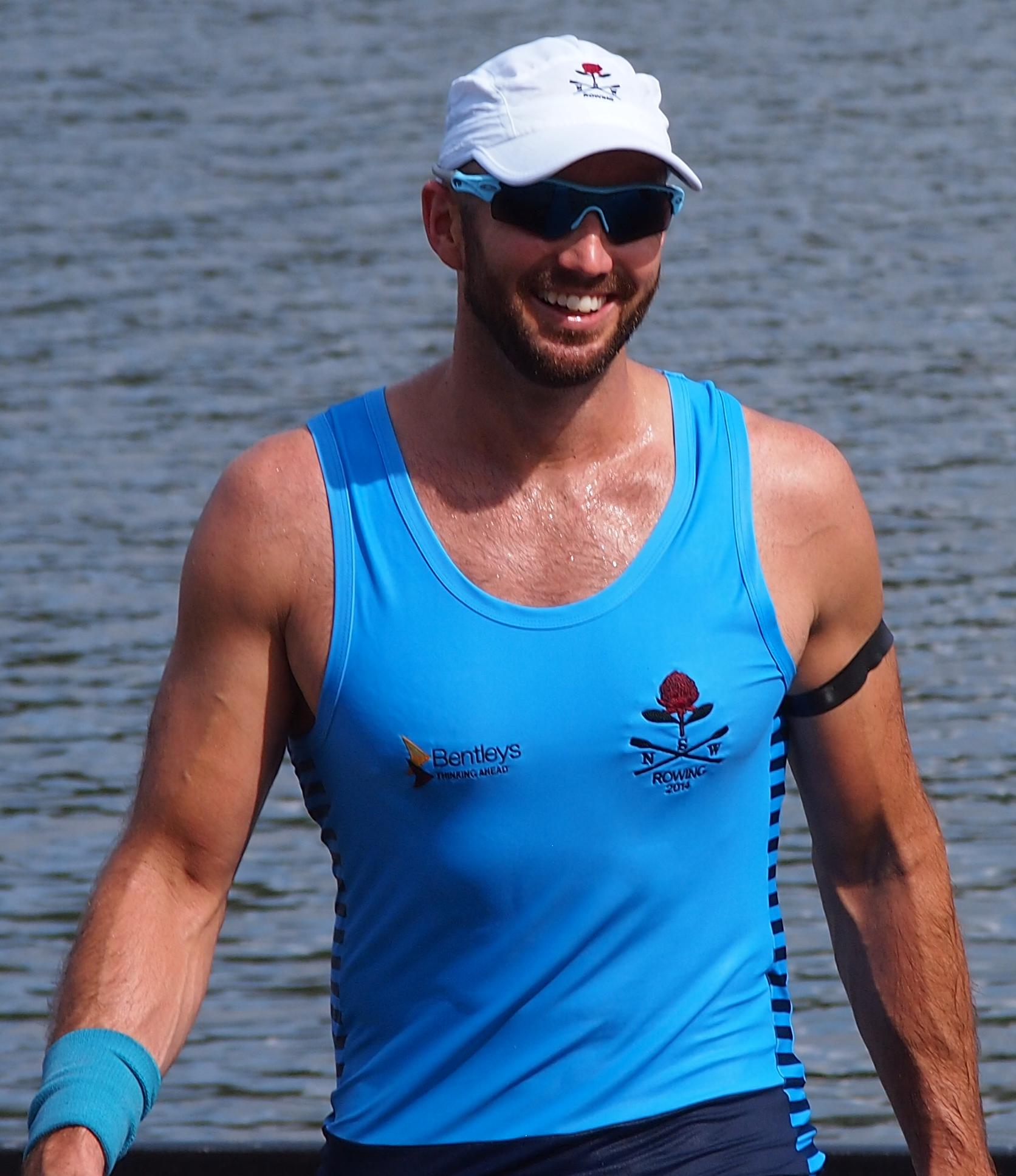

Personal information
- Born: 22 November 1979 (age 46) Sydney
- Education: Newington College; University of Technology, Sydney
- Occupation: Banker

Sport
- Sport: Rowing
- Club: UTS Haberfield; Sydney Rowing Club
Medal record
Representing Australia
Men's rowing
Olympic Games
Silver medal – second place	2012 London	M4-
World Rowing Championships
Silver medal – second place	2011 Lake Bled	M2+

James Jonathan Chapman (born 2 November 1979) is an Australian former national, Olympic representative and Olympic medal winning rower.

== Education ==
Raised in Sydney, Chapman attended Newington College where he was coached by Michael Morgan OAM, an Olympian and fellow Old Newingtonian, and Robert Buntine, deputy headmaster. In 1997 he was a member of the Newington Head of the River winning 1st VIII that won the centenary regatta. He studied accounting at the University of Technology Sydney.

== Club and state rowing ==
His senior rowing was initially with the UTS Haberfield Rowing Club. For twelve of the thirteen years from 2003 to 2015 he was seated in the New South Wales state VIII which contested the King's Cup at the Australian Rowing Championships. In 2004, 2008, 2010, 2011, 2012, 2013, and 2014 Chapman rowed in victorious New South Wales King's Cup crews.

Following the 2008 Beijing Olympics Chapman joined the Sydney Rowing Club as a competing member and a senior coach.

== National representative rowing ==
Chapman was first selected to compete for Australia in the two seat of the men's VIII who took the silver medal at the under 23 World Championships in Copenhagen in 2000. In 2003 he rowed at the World Championships in the men's coxless four who placed 4th in the final. He was in the bow seat of the Australian Men's VIII at the World Championships 2006 who also finished 4th. He won a silver medal at the 2011 World Rowing Championships in the men's coxed pair with William Lockwood and David Webster.

Chapman first made Olympic selection as a reserve in the Australian squad for the 2004 Summer Olympics in Athens. He rowed for Australia in the men's VIII at the 2008 Summer Olympics in Beijing. At the 2012 London Olympics, Chapman won a silver medal in the Australian men's coxless four.

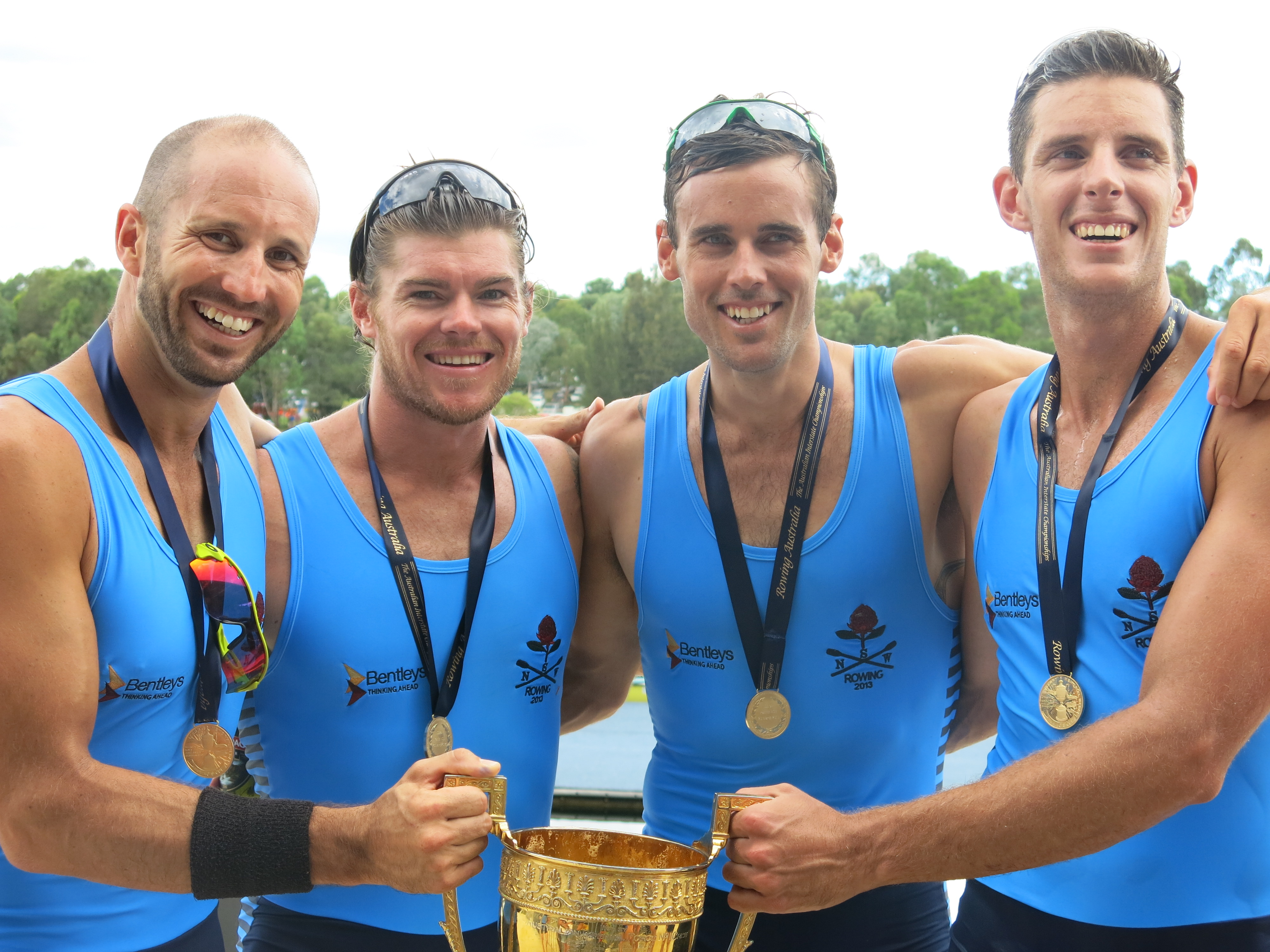
Chapman, Sam Loch, Matt Ryan & Fergus Pragnell with the Kings Cup in 2013 – the 6th time each oarsman won the event.

== Banking ==
From 1998, Chapman worked at Westpac starting as a teller, completing his accounting degree. Employed as an associate director in the bank's institutional group, Chapman left Westpac in 2015 to commence his MBA at the Macquarie Graduate School of Management.
