= Cristy Nurse =

Canadian rower

Medal record

Women's Rowing

Representing Canada

World Championships
Silver medal – second place	2010 Cambridge	Eight
Silver medal – second place	2011 Bled	Eight
Silver medal – second place	2013 Chungju	Coxless four
Silver medal – second place	2014 Amsterdam	Eight
Bronze medal – third place	2013 Chungju	Eight
Bronze medal – third place	2015 Aiguebelette	Eight

Cristy Nurse (born December 5, 1986, in Georgetown, Ontario) is a Canadian rower.

In June 2016, she was officially named to Canada's 2016 Olympic team.
