= Dominic Grimm =

Australian rower (born 1988)

Personal information
- Nickname: Reaper
- Born: 14 January 1988 (age 38) Sydney, Australia
- Education: Sydney Boys High School

Sport
- Club: Sydney Rowing Club
Medal record
Men's rowing
Representing Australia
World Rowing Championships
Gold medal – first place	2010 Karapiro	M2+
World Rowing U23 Championships
Bronze medal – third place	U23 2010 Brest	M4-

Dominic Grimm (born 14 January 1988 in Sydney) is an Australian national champion rower who in 2010 won a world championship in the coxed pair.

== Club and state rowing ==
Grimm attended Sydney Boys High School from 2000 to 2005 where he took up rowing. His senior rowing was done from the Sydney Rowing Club.

He was first selected to represent New South Wales in the youth eight competing for the Noel F Wilkinson Trophy at the Interstate Regatta within the 2008 Australian Rowing Championships. In 2009 and 2010 he was selected in New South Wales senior men's eights who contested and both won the King's Cup at the annual Interstate Regatta.

In Sydney Rowing Club colours contested Australian national titles on a number of occasions starting in 2008 where he contested the U23 men's coxless pair, coxless four and eight. He won a scholarship to the Australian Institute of Sport and in 2009 at the Australian Rowing Championships he stroked an eight contesting the U23 men's eight title; stroked an AIS pair contesting the Australian coxless pair title (they placed second); and stroked an AIS four to win the national coxless four championship title.

== International representative rowing ==
Grimm was selected to Australian representative honours in 2010. He raced with South Australia's Bryn Coudraye at the World Rowing Cups II and III in Europe in a coxless pair finishing well outside of medal contention. At the second of those WRC's in Lucerne he and Coudraye had success in a Coxed pair with Toby Lister on the rudder. They won their event. A month later at the World Rowing U23 Championships in Brest, Belarus he rowed in the Australian U23 men's coxless four with Will Lockwood, Nicholas Purnell and Joshua Dunkley-Smith and won the bronze medal.

Later in 2010, in the southern summer and with another South Australian partner in Chris Morgan, Grimm took a coxed pair to the 2010 World Rowing Championships in Lake Karapiro, New Zealand. This time with David Webster steering from the bow, the pair won the gold and Grimm's sole World Championship title. 2010 was his first and last international rowing representative season.

== Personal ==
Grimm undertook a B.Business degree at the University of Technology Sydney. He worked for a time for Rowing New South Wales and began photographing regattas using drone technology. Since 2017 he has pursued a broader interest in aerial photography.
