= Irina Kostyukhina =

Russian coxswain

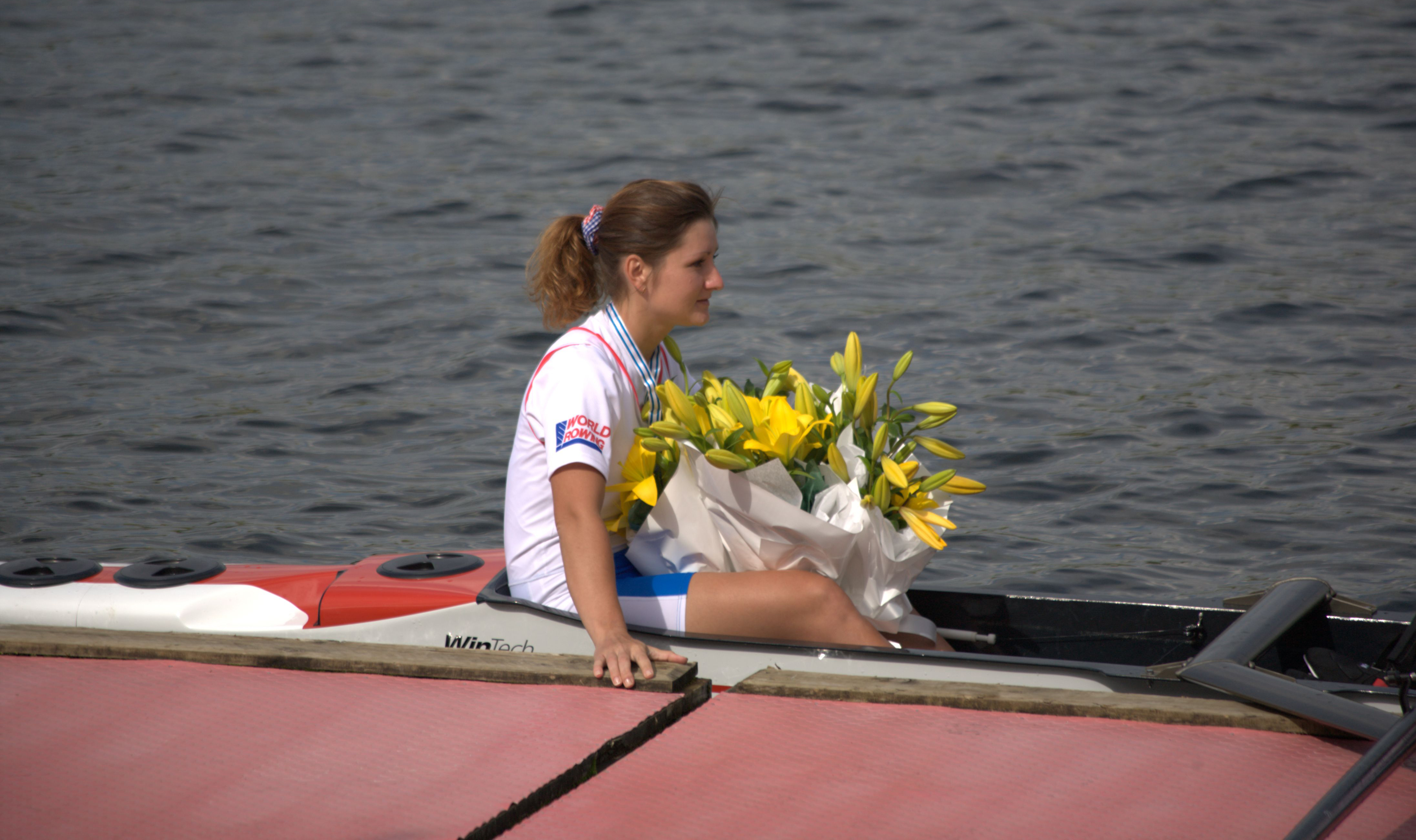
Kostyukhina after winning bronze in 2010

Irina Kostyukhina (born 20 October 1981) is a Russian coxswain. She won a bronze medal with the mixed coxed four at the 2010 World Rowing Championships in the adaptive rowing category.
