= Darryn Purcell =

Australian rower (born 1985)

Personal information
- Born: 5 October 1985 (age 41)
- Years active: 1998-2015

Sport
- Sport: Rowing
- Club: Toowong Rowing Club
Medal record
Men's rowing
Representing Australia
World Rowing Championships
Gold medal – first place	2011 Bled	Lwt eight
Silver medal – second place	2010 Karapiro	Lwt eight
Silver medal – second place	2013 Chungju	Lwt eight

Darryn Purcell (born 5 October 1985) is an Australian former national and world champion lightweight rower. He won a gold medal at the 2011 World Rowing Championships in Bled with the lightweight men's eight.

== Club and state rowing ==
Purcell's senior club rowing was from the Toowong Rowing Club in Brisbane.

From 2007 to 2015 Purcell was selected at stroke on nine consecutive occasions to represent Queensland in the men's lightweight coxless four contesting the Penrith Cup at the Interstate Regatta within the Australian Rowing Championships. He stroked those Queensland fours for nine of those occasions including three successive Penrith Cup victories from 2013 to 2015.

In Toowong Rowing Club colours he contested national championship titles at the Australian Rowing Championships on a number of occasions including the lightweight coxless pair in 2007 and 2008 and the lightweight men's eight in 2007 and 2008.

== International representative rowing ==
Purcell was first selected to represent Australia at the 2006 World Rowing U23 Championships in Hazewinkel in a lightweight quad scull. They won the bronze medal. The following year at the 2007 World Rowing U23 Championships in Glasgow with just one crew change, Purcell again raced in the quad to a fourth placing.

In 2008 Purcell was elevated to the Australian senior lightweight squad and he raced in the men's eight which placed eighth at the World Championships in Linz. He was selected in the Australian men's lightweight coxless four contesting the 2009 World Rowing Championships in Poznan and placed 14th. In 2010 at the World Championships in Lake Karapiro, Purcell was seated at bow in the Australian men's lightweight eight stroked by Perry Ward which placed second and won the silver medal.

The Australian lightweight eight stayed together into 2011 with the changeout of Perry Ward and Angus Tyers for Rod Chisolm and Tom Gibson and a move of Purcell into the stroke seat. At the 2011 World Championships in Bled he paced their final to perfection coming through the field from the 500mark, sitting second at the 1000 and the 1500, and running down the Italians in the last 200m to take the gold by 0.17seconds, winning Purcell his first and only World Championship title.

Purcell continued to represent Australia at the elite world level till 2015. He won a bronze medal at the 2013 World Rowing Cup I in Sydney in a lightweight four and also raced in the lightweight eight at that regatta. He represented Australia in two crews at the 2013 World Rowing Championships in Chungju placing tenth in the coxless four and second in the eight winning his third world championship medal - a silver. In 2014 he competed in the lightweight coxless four at the World Rowing Cup I in Sydney and in a coxless pair with Alister Foot at World Rowing Cup III in Lucerne. Then at the 2014 World Championships Purcell and Foot finished sixth in the pair. His final Australian representative appearances were in 2015. He held his seat in the lightweight coxless four into 2015 and rowed in that boat at two World Rowing Cups in Europe but when Perry Ward had to make a late withdrawal from the crew due to injury just before the 2015 World Rowing Championships Purcell and Nicholas Silcox were reassigned to race in a lightweight coxless pair. They finished in sixth place. It was Purcell's last national representative appearance.
