= Jan Lüke =

German rower

Personal information
- Born: 29 January 1989 (age 37) Georgsmarienhütte, West Germany

Sport
- Sport: Rowing
Medal record
Men's rowing
Representing Germany
World Rowing Championships
Gold medal – first place	2010 Karapiro	Lwt eight

Jan Lüke (born 29 January 1989) is a German lightweight rower. He won a gold medal at the 2010 World Rowing Championships in Karapiro with the lightweight men's eight.
