= Matteo Pinca =

Italian rower

Personal information
- National team: Italy
- Born: 12 October 1990 (age 35) Como, Italy
- Height: 1.78 m (5 ft 10 in)
- Weight: 63 kg (139 lb)

Sport
- Sport: Rowing
- Club: C.S. Carabinieri
- Start activity: 2003
- Coached by: Giuseppe Maioli
Medal record
Event	1st	2nd	3rd
World Championships	0	1	1
European Championships	0	0	1
Total	0	1	2

Matteo Pinca (born 12 October 1990) is an Italian male rower medal winner at senior level at the World Rowing Championships and European Rowing Championships.
