= Todd Skipworth =

Australian rower (born 1985)

Personal information
- Born: 15 February 1985 (age 41) Perth, Western Australia
- Years active: 1999-2012

Sport
- Sport: Rowing, Triathlon
- Club: Swan River Rowing Club
Medal record
Men's rowing
Representing Australia
Gold medal – first place	2011 Lake Bled	LM4-
Silver medal – second place	2010 Lake Lake Karapiro	LM4-

Todd Skipworth (born 15 February 1985) is an Australian former lightweight rower and triathlete. He was a nine-time national champion rower, a world champion and dual Olympian. His 2011 rowing world championship was won in the men's lightweight coxless four and he competed in that boat class at the 2008 and 2012 Summer Olympics.

== Club and state rowing ==
Skipworth's senior rowing was from the Swan River Rowing Club in Perth.

From 2006 to 2012 Skipworth was selected to represent Western Australia in the men's lightweight four contesting the Penrith Cup at the Interstate Regatta within the Australian Rowing Championships. He was in the three consecutive winning West Australian fours of 2007 to 2009 and stroked those crews in 2008 and 2009.

Wearing Swan River Rowing Club colours he contested national lightweight titles at the Australian Rowing Championships from 2005. He competed in the lightweight coxless pair championship in 2005, 2006, 2007, 2008 winning that national title on all four occasions. He competed in the lightweight four in 2005, 2006, 2007, 2008 winning the championship in 2005 and 2007; and he contested the lightweight men's eight in 2005 and 2008.

== International representative rowing ==
Skipworth was first selected to represent Australia in an U23 coxless four in 2004. They raced at the 2004 World Rowing U23 Championships in Poznan where they finished fourth. In 2005 he was selected in the Australian senior lightweight coxless four and who finished fourth at the 2005 World Rowing Championships in Gifu, Japan.

He cemented his spot in the Australian lightweight coxless four and from 2006 until the 2008 Summer Olympics he raced in that crew at each World Rowing Cup or World Championship where it competed. The four finished sixth at the 2006 World Rowing Championships in Eton Dorney; seventh at Munich 2007 (by which point Skipworth was stroking the crew); and in ninth place at the 2008 Beijing Olympics.

Skipworth took time off after the Olympics but in 2010 with unfinished world championship business, was back in the stroke seat in the lightweight coxless four who contested two World Rowing Cups in Europe. At the 2010 World Rowing Championships in Lake Karapiro, Skipworth led the Australian lightweight four with Anthony Edwards, Blair Tunevitsch and Samuel Beltz to a silver medal. It was a thrilling race finish where five crews crossed the line within half a boat length. The Australian four with Skipworth at the stern end finished 0.07 secs behind Great Britain and 0.01 secs ahead of China to claim his third world championship medal – a silver.

In 2011 that Australian lightweight four stayed together with Tunevitsch changed out for Skipworth's West Australian team-mate Ben Cureton. At the 2011 World Rowing Championships in Bled they staged a brilliant campaign. Second in their heat, they had to qualify for the final through a repechage and a semi-final. In the final they rowed through the field from a fifth position at the 500m mark, to be 2nd at both the 1000 and 1500 and overtook the Italians in final run to take the gold medal with a 1.2 second margin. Skipworth set the pace to won his first senior world championship title, seven years after first racing in Australian representative colours.

Their world champion status qualified the lightweight foursome for the 2012 London Olympics for which they prepared by racing at two World Rowing Cups in Europe. At the 2012 Olympic regatta they placed second in the heat, third in the semi-final and made the Olympic final, finishing in fourth place. Less than one and a quarter seconds separated the 1st to 4th crews. It was Skipworth's and Cureton's last Australian representative appearance and they both retired at point. Skipworth and Cureton had won six Australian national titles together in Swan River colours, raced for Western Australia together five times for two national championship wins and represented Australia in the same boat at two Olympics and three World Championships.

== Triathlete ==
In 2008, following the Beijing Olympics, competing as an amateur, Skipworth placed 2nd in the 18-24 age group at Ironman Western Australia, qualifying for the world championships. At the 2009 Ironman World Championship he took 6th in his age group.

In 2014 he won the long distance Alpe d'Huez Triathlon.
