= 2010 World Rowing Championships =

International rowing event

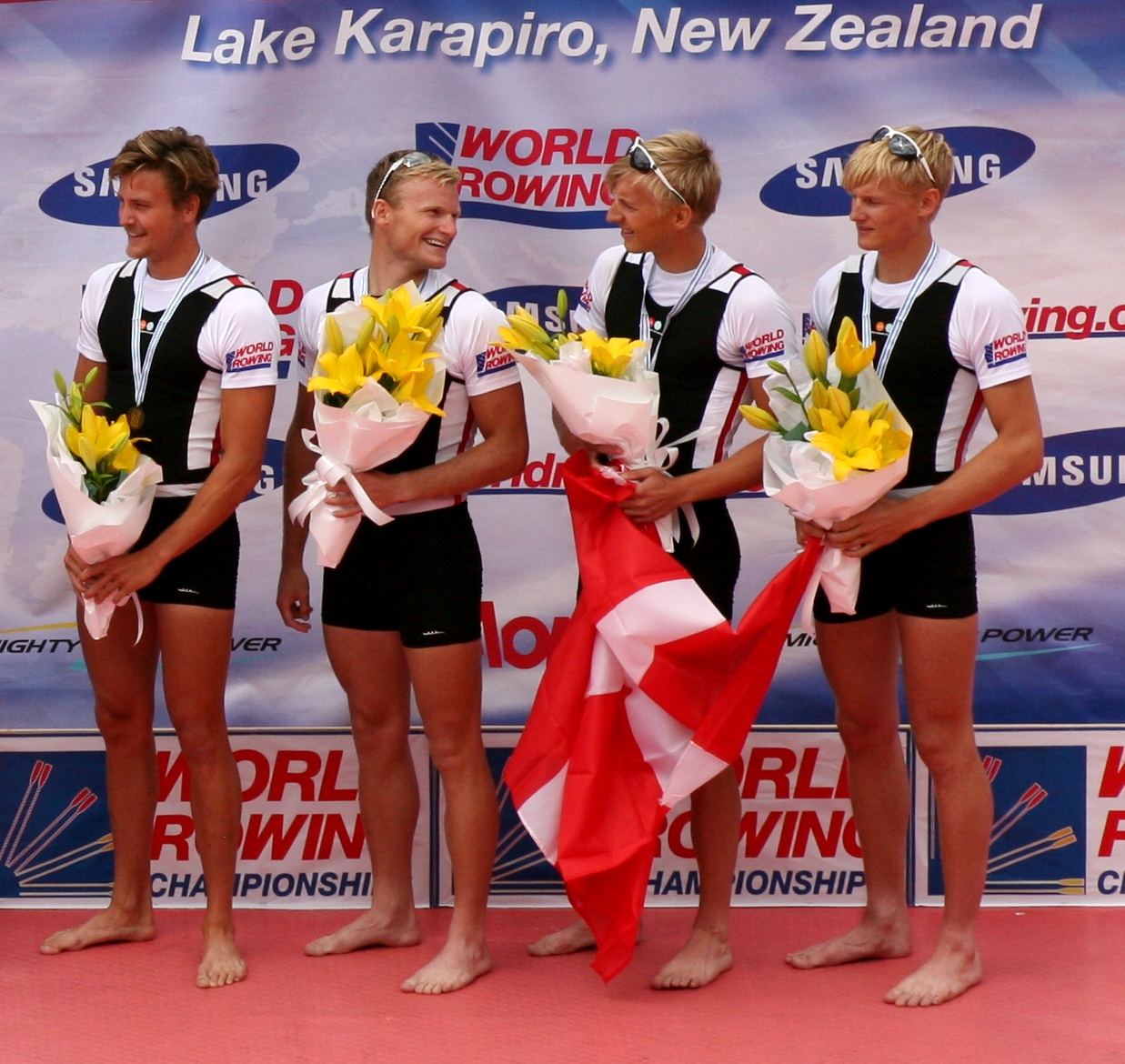
- The Danish lightweight quads (LM4x) on the podium after winning bronze
- Venue: Lake Karapiro
- Location: Cambridge, New Zealand
- Dates: 31 October to 7 November

The 2010 World Rowing Championships were World Rowing Championships that were held from 31 October to 7 November 2010 on Lake Karapiro near Cambridge, New Zealand. The annual week-long rowing regatta was organised by FISA (the International Rowing Federation). Usually held at the end of the northern hemisphere summer, they were held later in the year in the southern hemisphere. In non-Olympic years the regatta is the highlight of the international rowing calendar.

== Background ==
The World Rowing Championships were previously held at Lake Karapiro in 1978. Rowing's international body said Lake Karapiro's 2010 World Rowing Championships raised the bar for the rest of the world and more international events would be held there.

The 2010 World Rowing Championships turned out to be one of the most impressive championships ever.

Of the 161 races at the championships, Robert Treharne Jones, FISA commentator (GBR), commentated 88 of them, saying: "by far my favourite race was the men's pair. It was an awesome race and it was all that it was billed to be and more. Although it was a six boat final it was really one on one between New Zealand and Great Britain and to have them so close all the way. The crowd were literally on their feet. The event was great from every point of view. I can't fault it. The organisers worked very hard to get everything right."

It was predicted that it would take at least 70,000 people to make back the £16m price tag [but 66,000 attended]. The event lost $2.2m and a report by SPARC (Sport And Recreation New Zealand, rebranded as Sport New Zealand in 2012) found that a lack of clarity around roles and responsibilities of the Karapiro 2010 Board was a factor, alongside others mostly relating to shortcomings in governance, inadequate financial management, and less revenue than expected from ticket sales.

SPARC chief executive Peter Miskimmin said the review was a stark reminder for everyone involved in hosting major events in New Zealand, including the Government agencies which invest in them. "The Karapiro 2010 Board was committed to putting on a world-class event, and they achieved that. Operationally the event was a huge success." Miskimmin said, adding that the findings of the SPARC review would be used to develop additional good practice guidelines for those running future major events.

Rowing New Zealand makes use of their world-class facility at Lake Karapiro.

To interpret abbreviations in medals tables see Glossary of rowing terms. FISA publishes results online.

== Medal summary ==
=== Men's events ===
Non-Olympic classes

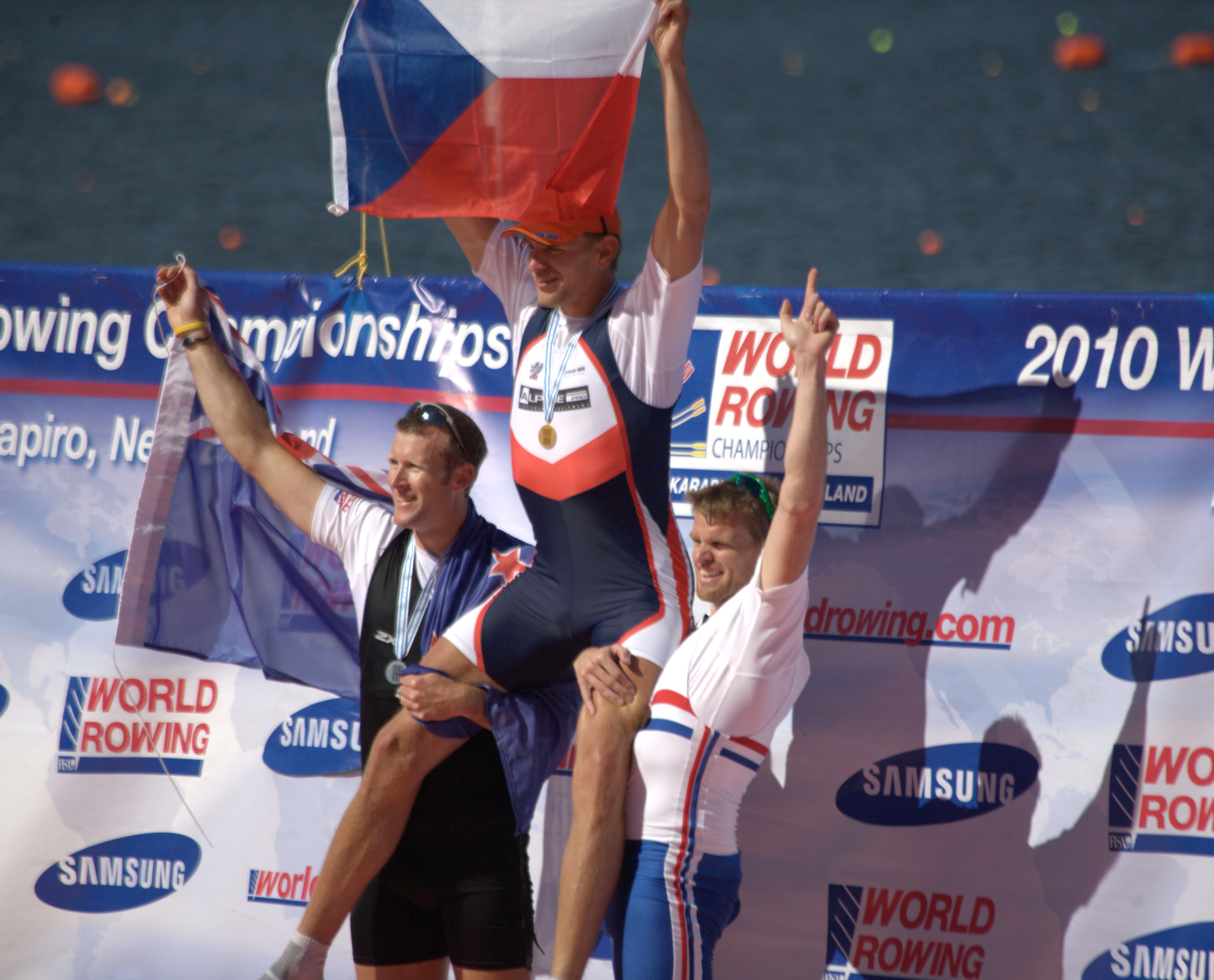
M1x medallists

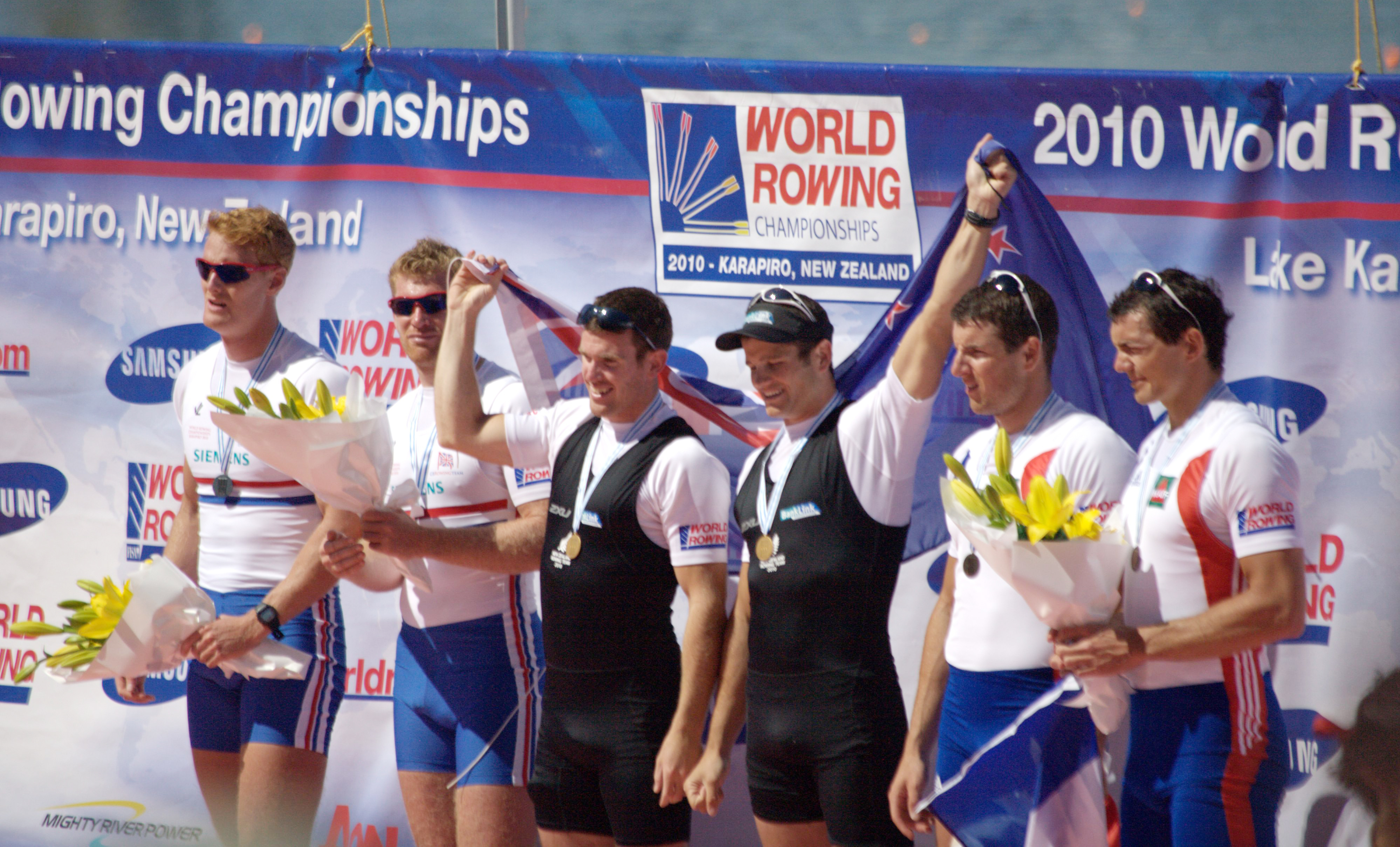
M2x medallists

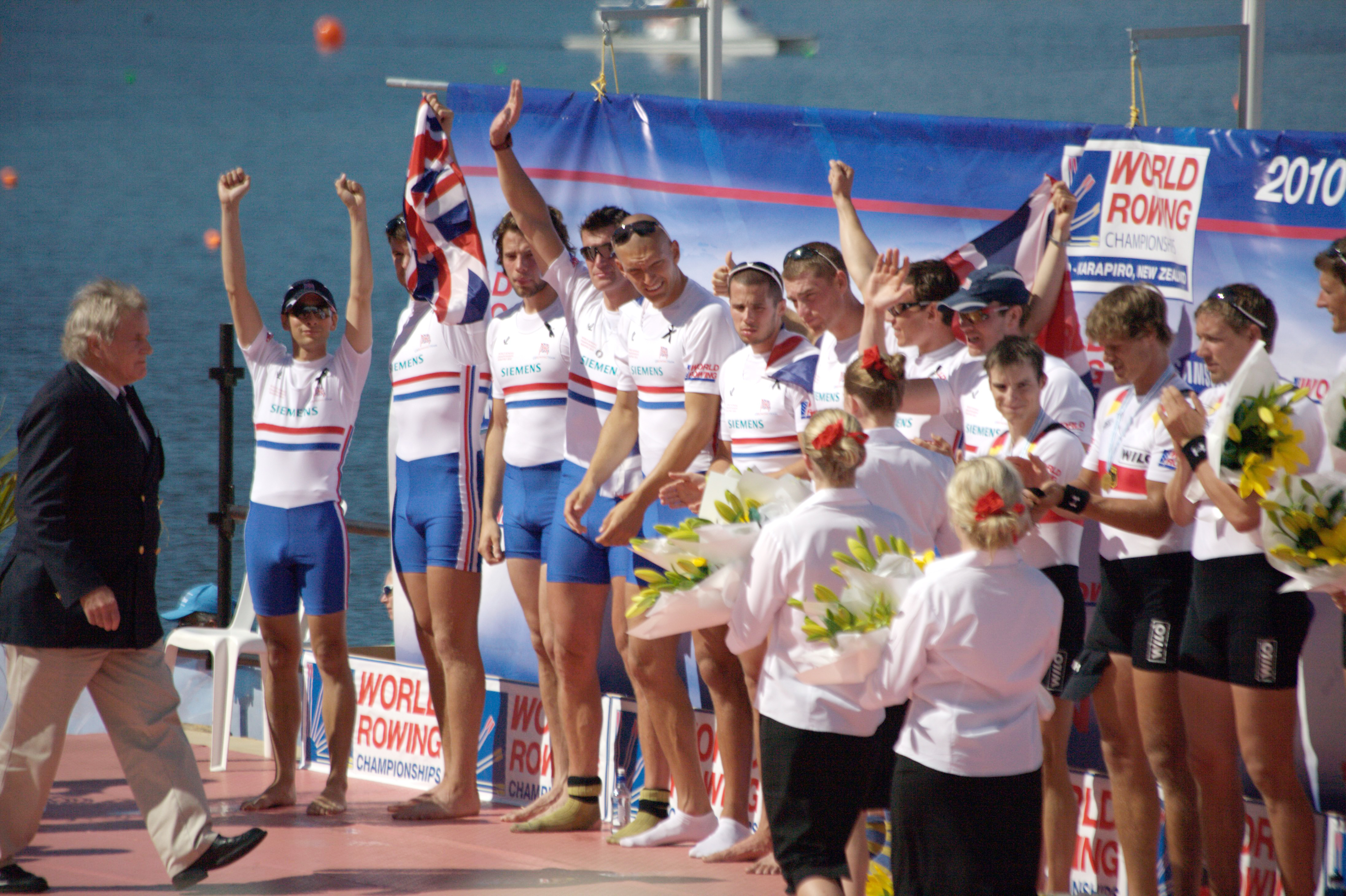
GB M8+ medallists (Great Britain and Germany only)

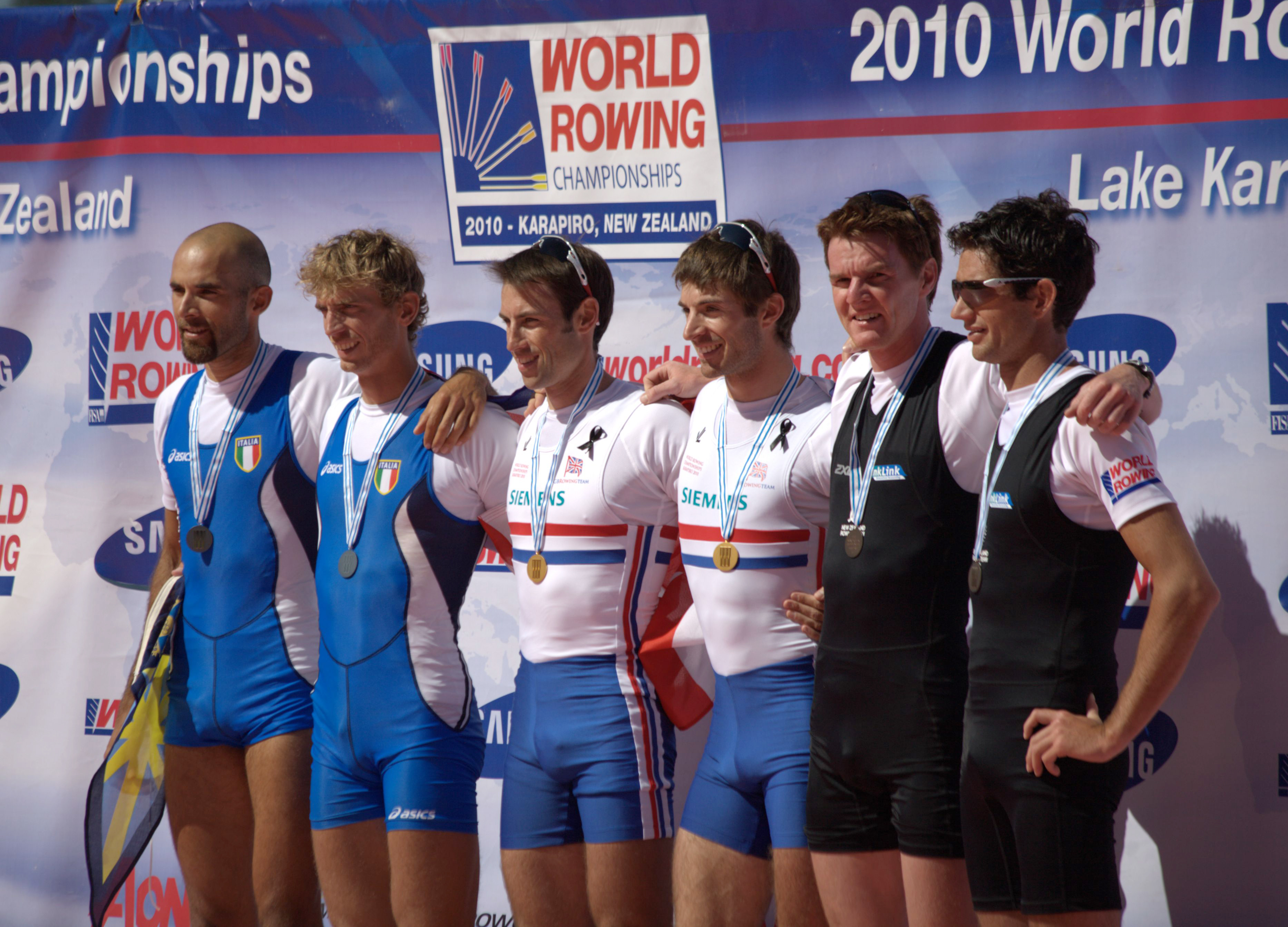
LM2x medallists

Event	Gold	Time	Silver	Time	Bronze	Time
M1x	Czech Republic; Ondřej Synek	6:47.49	New Zealand; Mahé Drysdale	6:49.42	Great Britain; Alan Campbell	6:49.83
M2x	New Zealand; Nathan Cohen; Joseph Sullivan	6:22.63	Great Britain; Matthew Wells; Marcus Bateman	6:24.21	France; Cédric Berrest; Julien Bahain	6:28.54
M4x	Croatia; David Šain; Martin Sinković; Damir Martin; Valent Sinković	6:15.78	Italy; Luca Agamennoni; Simone Venier; Matteo Stefanini; Simone Raineri	6:17.04	Australia; Karsten Forsterling; David Crawshay; James McRae; Daniel Noonan	6:18.93
M2+	Australia; Chris Morgan; Dominic Grimm; David Webster	7:03.32	Italy; Paolo Perino; Pierpaolo Frattini; Andrea Lenzi	7:04.38	Germany; Maximilian Munski; Filip Adamski; Albert Kowert	7:06.20
M2-	New Zealand; Eric Murray; Hamish Bond	6:30.16	Great Britain; Pete Reed; Andrew Triggs Hodge	6:30.48	Greece; Georgios Tziallas; Ioannis Christou	6:36.00
M4-	France; Jean-Baptiste Macquet; Germain Chardin; Julien Desprès; Dorian Mortelette	6:45.38	Greece; Stergios Papachristos; Ioannis Tsilis; Nikolaos Goudoulas; Apostolos Goudoulas	6:47.15	New Zealand; Jade Uru; Simon Watson; Hamish Burson; David Eade	6:48.38
M8+	Germany; Gregor Hauffe; Maximilian Reinelt; Kristof Wilke; Florian Mennigen; Richard Schmidt; Lukas Müller; Toni Seifert; Sebastian Schmidt; Martin Sauer	5:33.84	Great Britain; Tom Broadway; James Clarke; Cameron Nichol; James Foad; Moe Sbihi; Greg Searle; Tom Ransley; Daniel Ritchie; Phelan Hill	5:34.46	Australia; Will Lockwood; Matt Ryan; Francis Hegerty; Cameron McKenzie-McHarg; James Marburg; Samuel Loch; Nicholas Purnell; Josh Dunkley-Smith; Tobias Lister	5:35.96
Men's lightweight events
LM1x	Italy; Marcello Miani	7:05.82	Slovakia; Lukáš Babač	7:08.19	Hungary; Péter Galambos	7:09.86
LM2x	Great Britain; Zac Purchase; Mark Hunter	7:13.47	Italy; Lorenzo Bertini; Elia Luini	7:15.88	New Zealand; Storm Uru; Peter Taylor	7:18.31
LM4x	Germany; Jonathan Koch; Lars Wichert; Linus Lichtschlag; Lars Hartig	6:11.44	France; Alexandre Pilat; Pierre-Étienne Pollez; Stany Delayre; Frédéric Dufour	6:14.02	Denmark; Steffen Jensen; Martin Batenburg; Christian Nielsen; Hans Christian Sørensen	6:14.94
LM2-	France; Fabien Tilliet; Jean-Christophe Bette	7:18.92	New Zealand; Graham Oberlin-Brown; James Lassche	7:21.29	Canada; Matt Jensen; Rares Crisan	7:23.79
LM4-	Great Britain; Richard Chambers; Paul Mattick; Rob Williams; Chris Bartley	6:10.71	Australia; Anthony Edwards; Samuel Beltz; Blair Tunevitsch; Todd Skipworth	6:10.78	China; Li Lei; Yu Chenggang; Huang Zhe; Li Zhongwei	6:10.79
LM8+	Germany; Daniel Wisgott; Robby Gerhardt; Jan Lüke; Lars Wichert; Jochen Kühner; Bastian Seibt; Jost Schömann-Finck; Martin Kühner; Albert Kowert	5:48.61	Australia; Ross Brown; Angus Tyers; Blair Tunevitsch; Alister Foot; Nicholas Baker; Darryn Purcell; Thomas Bertrand; Perry Ward; David Webster	5:50.27	Italy; Luigi Scala; Davide Riccardi; Luca De Maria; Armando Dell'Aquila; Matteo Pinca; Gennaro Gallo; Livio La Padula; Bruno Mascarenhas; Vincenzo Di Palma	5:52.24

=== Women's events ===
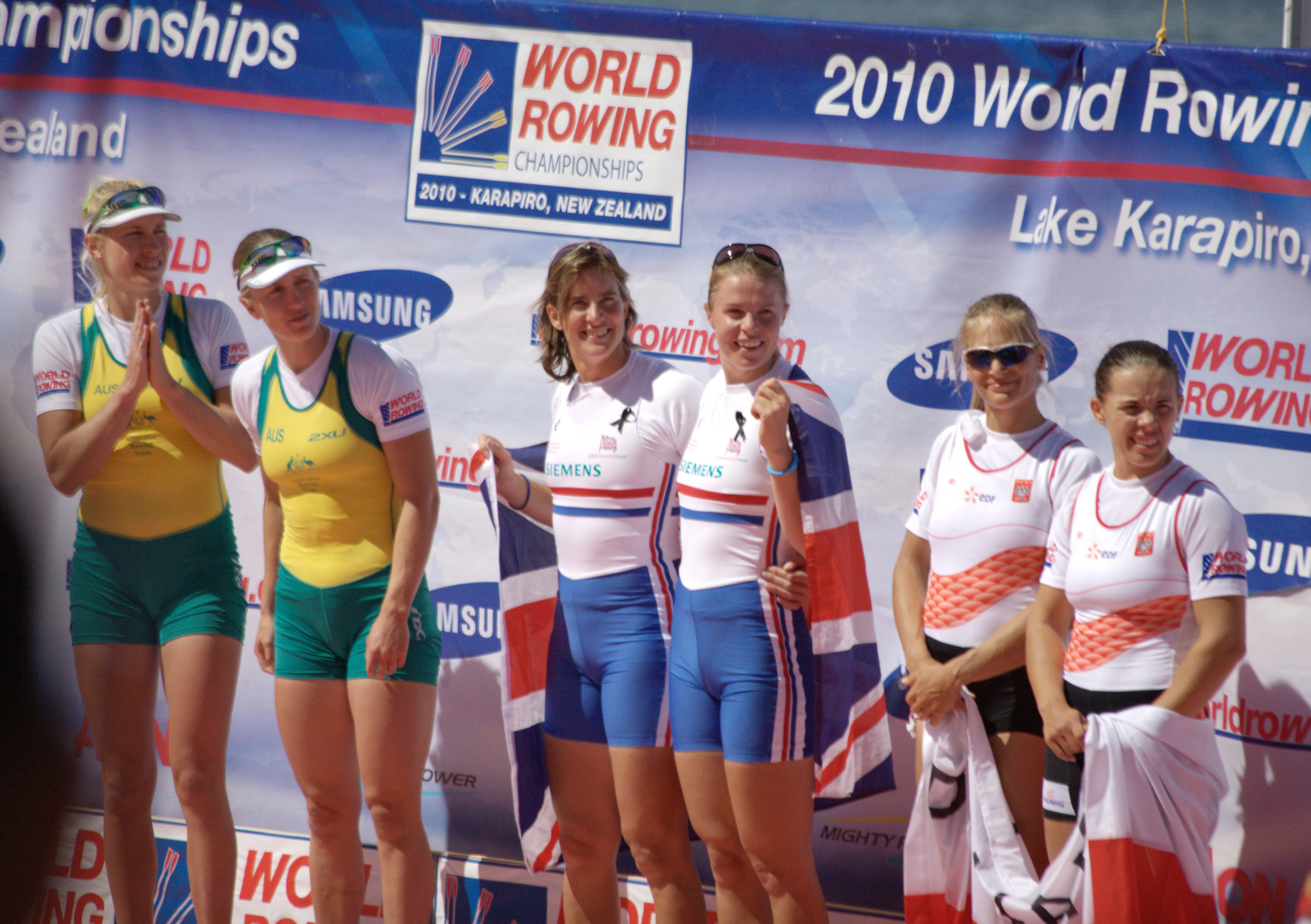
W2x medallists

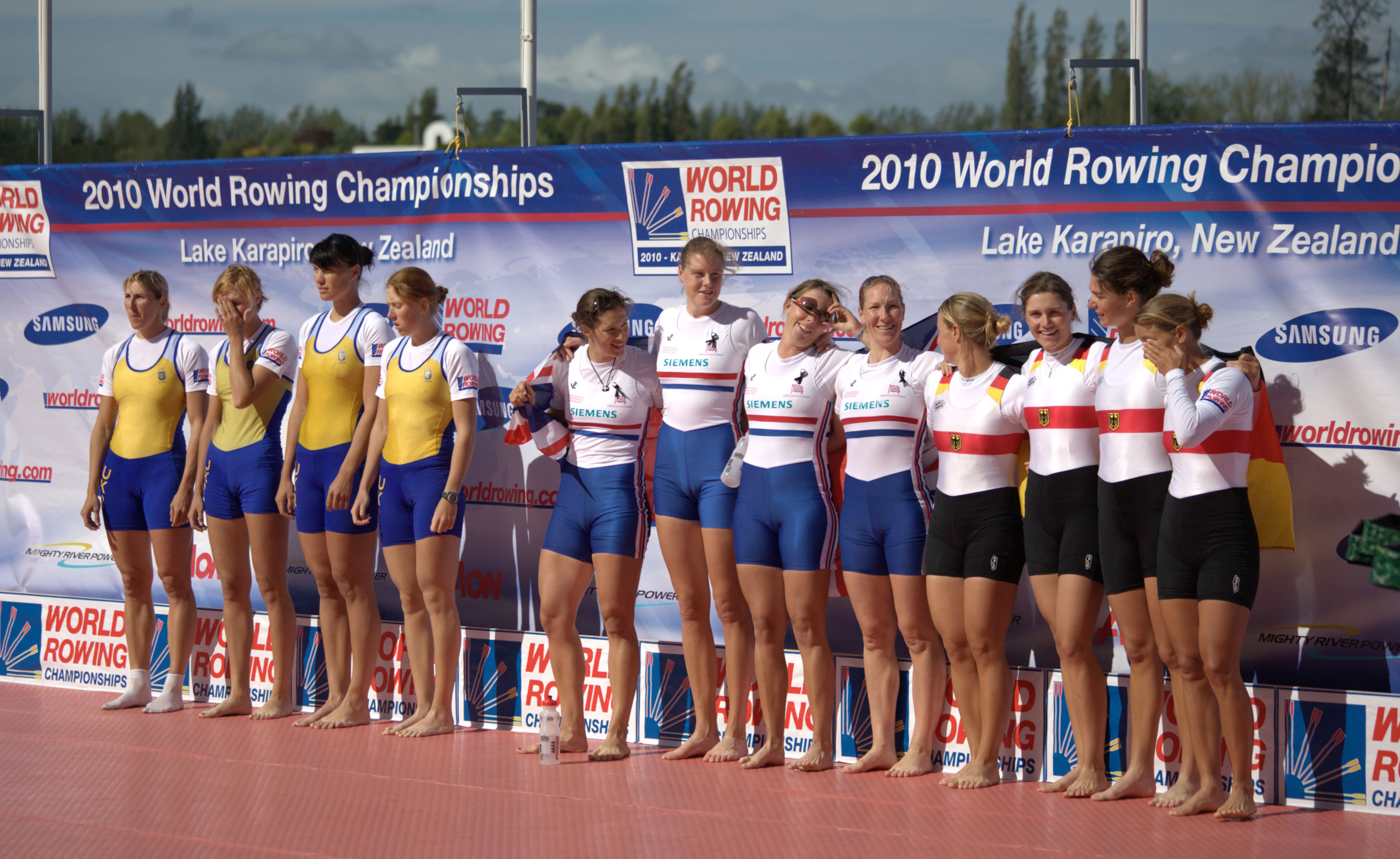
W4x medallists

Non-Olympic classes

Event	Gold	Time	Silver	Time	Bronze	Time
W1x	Sweden; Frida Svensson	7:47.61	Belarus; Ekaterina Karsten	7:47.79	New Zealand; Emma Twigg	7:49.64
W2x	Great Britain; Anna Watkins; Katherine Grainger	7:04.70	Australia; Kerry Hore; Kim Crow	7:10.08	Poland; Magdalena Fularczyk; Julia Michalska	7:14.40
W4x	Great Britain; Debbie Flood; Beth Rodford; Frances Houghton; Annabel Vernon	7:12.78	Ukraine; Kateryna Tarasenko; Olena Buryak; Anastasiya Kozhenkova; Yana Dementyeva	7:14.95	Germany; Britta Oppelt; Carina Bär; Tina Manker; Julia Richter	7:15.26
W2-	New Zealand; Juliette Haigh; Rebecca Scown	7:17.12	Great Britain; Helen Glover; Heather Stanning	7:20.24	United States; Susan Francia; Erin Cafaro	7:22.46
W4-	Netherlands; Chantal Achterberg; Nienke Kingma; Carline Bouw; Femke Dekker	7:21.09	Australia; Sarah Heard; Sarah Cook; Pauline Frasca; Kate Hornsey	7:23.99	United States; Mara Allen; Grace Luczak; Adrienne Martelli; Alison Cox	7:24.56
W8+	United States; Anna Goodale; Amanda Polk; Jamie Redman; Taylor Ritzel; Esther Lofgren; Elle Logan; Meghan Musnicki; Katherine Glessner; Mary Whipple	6:12.42	Canada; Emma Darling; Cristy Nurse; Janine Hanson; Rachelle Viinberg; Krista Guloien; Ashley Brzozowicz; Darcy Marquardt; Andréanne Morin; Lesley Thompson-Willie	6:16.12	Romania; Roxana Cogianu; Ionela Zaharia; Maria Diana Bursuc; Ioana Crăciun; Adelina Cojocariu; Nicoleta Albu; Camelia Lupașcu; Eniko Mironcic; Teodora Stoica	6:18.96
Women's lightweight events
LW1x	Germany; Marie-Louise Dräger	7:43.45	New Zealand; Louise Ayling	7:48.48	Italy; Laura Milani	7:49.04
LW2x	Canada; Lindsay Jennerich; Tracy Cameron	8:06.20	Germany; Daniela Reimer; Anja Noske	8:07.33	Greece; Christina Giazitzidou; Alexandra Tsiavou	8:09.14
LW4x	Germany; Lena Müller; Daniela Reimer; Anja Noske; Marie-Louise Dräger	6:44.94	United States; Victoria Burke; Kristin Hedstrom; Ursula Grobler; Abelyn Broughton	6:47.99	China; Yan Shimin; Wang Xinnan; Liu Jing; Liu Tingting	6:49.50

=== Adaptive events ===
Non-Paralympic classes

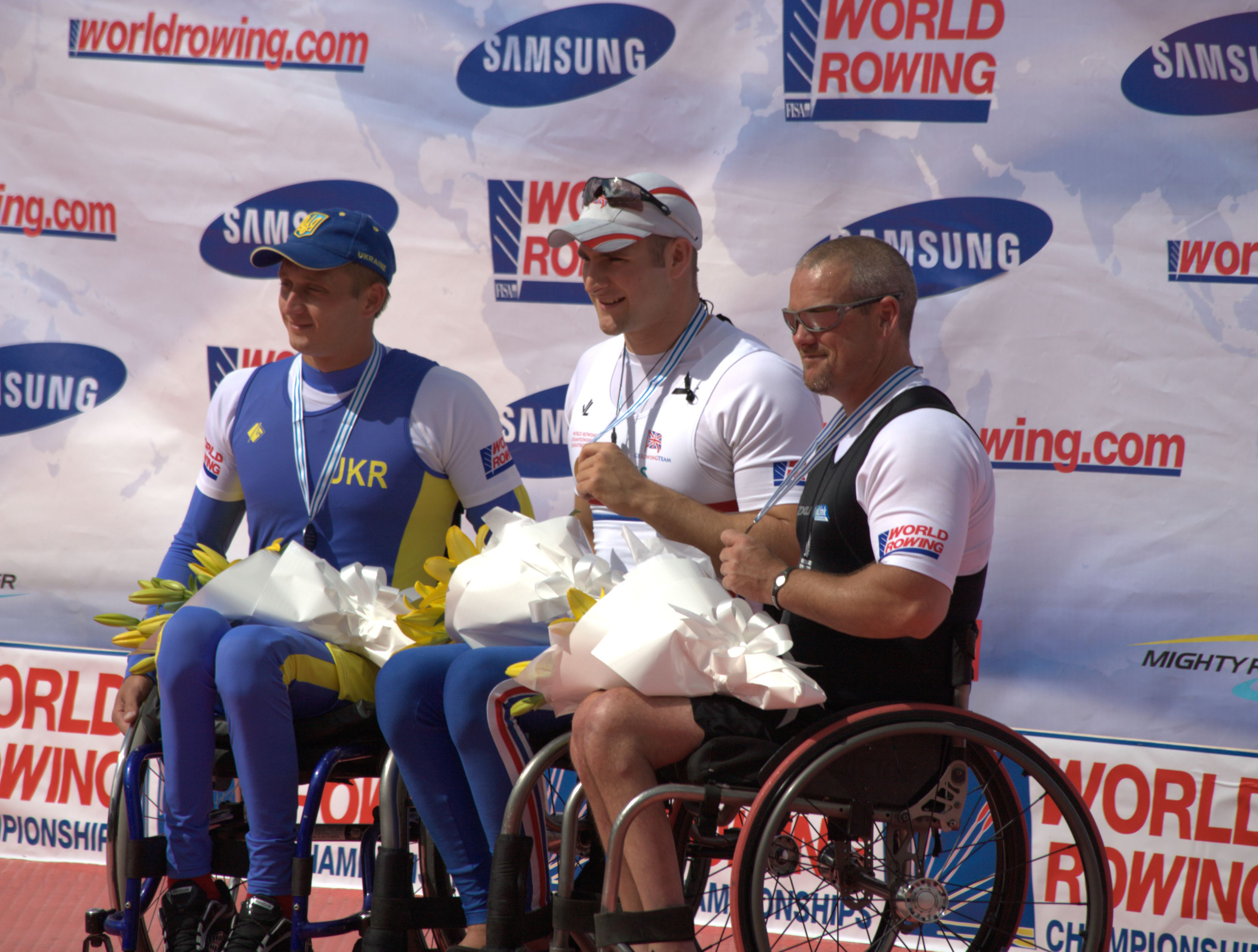
ASM1x medallists

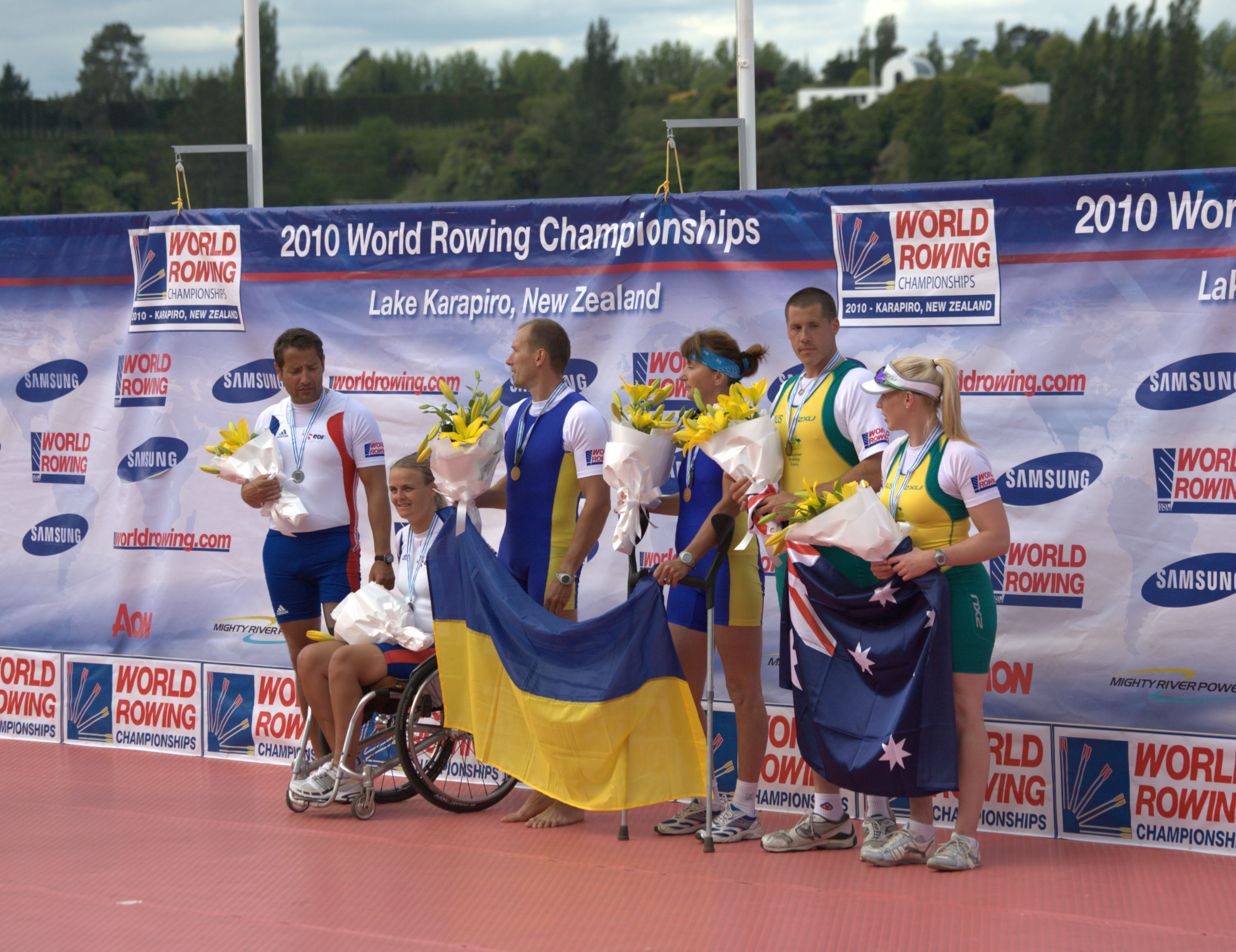
TAMix2x medallists

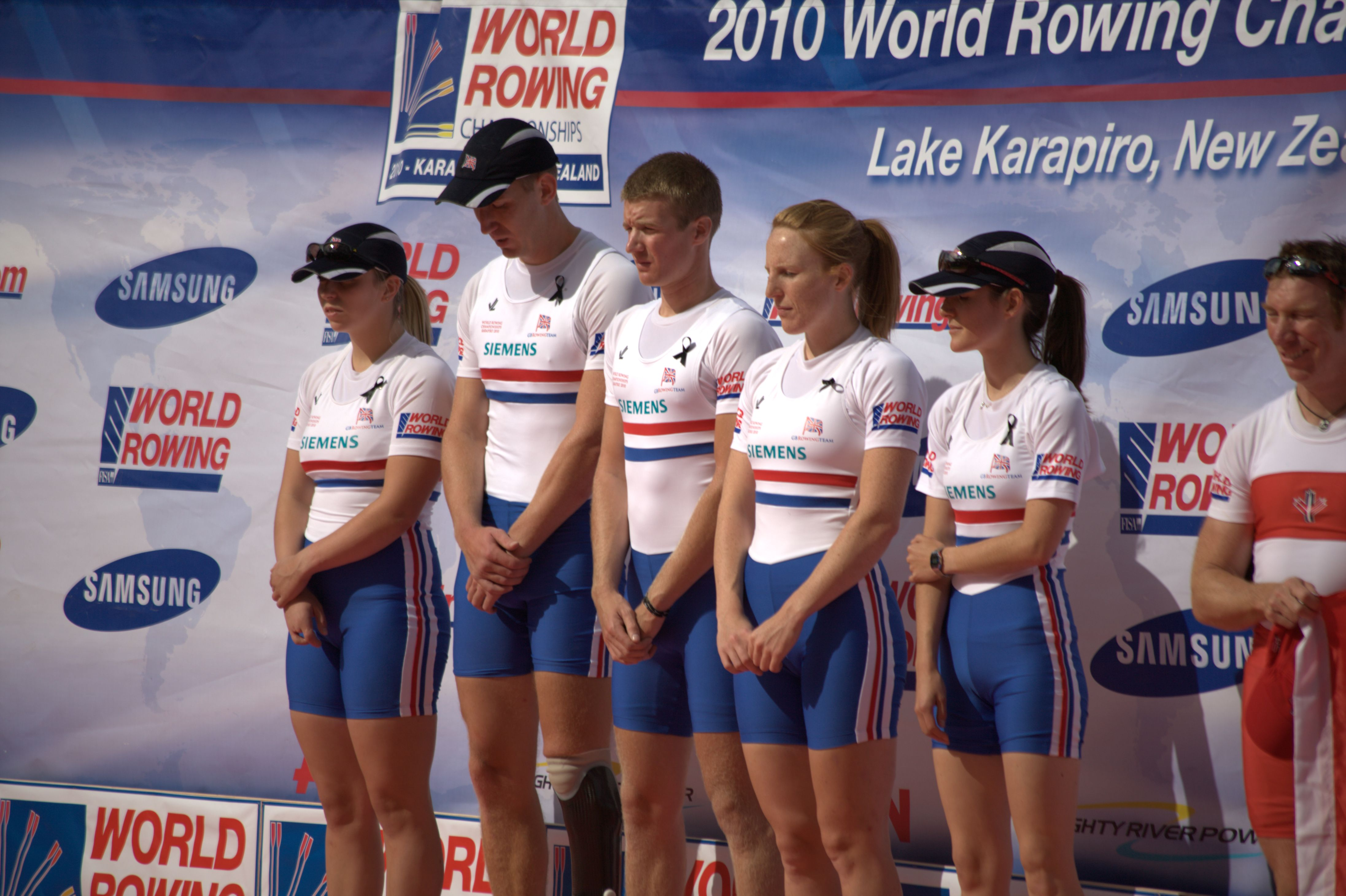
The LTAMix4+ silver medallists from Great Britain

Event	Gold	Time	Silver	Time	Bronze	Time
ASM1x	Great Britain; Tom Aggar	5:19.36	Ukraine; Andrii Kryvchun	5:32.67	New Zealand; Daniel McBride	5:33.39
ASW1x	France; Nathalie Benoit	6:43.18	Brazil; Cláudia Santos	6:47.60	Portugal; Filomena Franco	7:37.46
TAMx2x	Ukraine; Dmytro Ivanov; Iryna Kyrychenko	4:24.71	France; Stephane Tardieu; Perle Bouge	4:28.05	Australia; Grant Bailey; Kathryn Ross	4:28.16
IDMx4+	Hong Kong; Liu Wang Sin; Lam King Shan; Szeto Tung Chun; Tsui Kwok Man; Lee Yuen Wah	4:09.58	Italy; Giorgia Indelicato; Elisabetta Tieghi; Francesco Borsani; Matteo Brunengo; Andrea Lenzi	4:30.37	Russia; Iulia Zhdanova; Olga Orlova; Boris Maximov; Gennady Mikhaylov; Irina Kostyukhina	5:00.28
LTAMx4+	Canada; Anthony Theriault; Meghan Montgomery; Victoria Nolan; David Blair; Laura Comeau	3:36.53	Great Britain; Kelsie Gibson; Ryan Chamberlain; James Roe; Katherine Jones; Rhiannon Jones	3:37.08	Germany; Christiane Quirin; Michael Schulz; Martin Lossau; Anke Molkenthin; Katrin Splitt	3:39.65

== Medal table ==
=== Men's and women's events ===
Place	Nation	1st place, gold medalist(s)	2nd place, silver medalist(s)	3rd place, bronze medalist(s)	Total
1	Germany	5	1	2	8
2	Great Britain	4	4	1	9
3	New Zealand	3	3	3	9
4	France	2	1	1	4
5	Australia	1	4	2	7
6	Italy	1	3	2	6
7	United States	1	1	2	4
8	Canada	1	1	1	3
9	Croatia	1	0	0	1
9	Czech Republic	1	0	0	1
9	Netherlands	1	0	0	1
9	Sweden	1	0	0	1
13	Greece	0	1	2	3
14	Belarus	0	1	0	1
14	Slovakia	0	1	0	1
14	Ukraine	0	1	0	1
17	China	0	0	2	2
18	Denmark	0	0	1	1
18	Hungary	0	0	1	1
18	Poland	0	0	1	1
18	Romania	0	0	1	1
Total		22	22	22	66

=== Adaptive events ===
Place	Nation	1st place, gold medalist(s)	2nd place, silver medalist(s)	3rd place, bronze medalist(s)	Total
1	France	1	1	0	2
1	Great Britain	1	1	0	2
1	Ukraine	1	1	0	2
4	Canada	1	0	0	1
4	Hong Kong	1	0	0	1
6	Brazil	0	1	0	1
6	Italy	0	1	0	1
8	Australia	0	0	1	1
8	Germany	0	0	1	1
8	New Zealand	0	0	1	1
8	Portugal	0	0	1	1
8	Russia	0	0	1	1
Total		5	5	5	15
