= Thomas Gibson (rower) =

Australian rower (born 1982)

Personal information
- Born: 6 May 1982 (age 44) Hobart, Tasmania
- Years active: 1992-2014
- Height: 1.81 m (5 ft 11 1/2 in)
- Weight: 72 kg (159 lb)

Sport
- Country: Australia
- Sport: Rowing
- Club: Tamar Rowing Club
Medal record
Men's rowing
Representing Australia
World Championships
Gold medal – first place	2011 Bled	LM8+
Bronze medal – third place	2004 Banyoles	LM8+
U23 World Championships
Gold medal – first place	2003 U23 Belgrade	L4-
Silver medal – second place	2002 U23 Genoa	L4-

Thomas Gibson (born 6 May 1982 in Hobart, Tasmania) is an Australian lightweight rower. He is a twelve-time Australian national champion, a world champion and a dual Olympian.

== State and club rowing ==
Gibson's senior club rowing was done from the Huon Rowing Club in Tasmania.

From 2004 to 2008 and from 2010 to 2012 Gibson was selected to represent Tasmania in the men's lightweight four contesting the Penrith Cup at the Interstate Regatta within the Australian Rowing Championships. He stroked the 2004, 2010, 2011 and 2012 Tasmanian state fours to victory, and also rowed to wins in 2005 and 2006.

Wearing Huon Rowing Club colours he contested national lightweight titles at the Australian Rowing Championships from 2004. He competed in the lightweight coxless pair championship in 2005; the lightweight four in 2005, 2007, 2008; and the lightweight men's eight in 2005, 2006, 2008 and 2010. He won national titles in 2005 (the pair and the eight); in 2006 and 2010 in the eight; in 2008 in the four and the eight.

== International representative rowing ==
Gibson was first selected for Australia in an U23 coxless four in 2002. They raced at the World Rowing Cup II in Lucerne before competing at the 2002 World Rowing U23 Championships in Genoa where they won silver. He was the sole member of that U23 lightweight four to remain in the crew into 2003 when they contested the World Rowing Cup III in Lucerne before winning a gold medal at the 2003 U23 World Championships in Belgrade.

In 2004 he was selected in the Australian senior lightweight eight and he won a bronze medal at the 2004 World Rowing Championships in Banyoles. At Gifu, Japan 2005 he again raced in the lightweight coxless four and finished in fourth place. In 2006 he rowed in the four at World Rowing Cup I and then in the lightweight double scull at WRC II before taking that double scull with Samuel Beltz to the 2006 World Rowing Championships at Eton Dorney for a fourth-place finish.

Throughout 2007 and 2008 Gibson and Beltz stayed together in the lightweight double scull racing in each year at two World Rowing Cups in Europe before the 2007 World Championships (achieving fourth place) and then the 2008 Beijing Olympics where they finished tenth.

Gibson took time off after the Olympics but was back in national contention in 2011 and raced in a lightweight coxless pair at the World Rowing Cup III in Lucerne. Australia's lightweight men's eight had been successful at the 2010 World Championships in New Zealand winning a silver medal. Gibson's opportunity came when Perry Ward and Angus Tyers were changed out and with Rod Chisholm, Gibson was added to the crew. At the 2011 World Rowing Championships in Bled, Slovenia the eight raced their final to perfection coming through the field from the 500mark, sitting second at the 1000 and the 1500, and running down the Italians in the last 200m to take the gold by 0.17seconds, winning Gibson his first senior World Championship title.

In 2012 at the last ditch Olympic qualification regatta, Chisholm and Gibson qualified an Australian lightweight double scull through to the 2012 Summer Olympics in London. They raced in the Olympic lightweight double sculls event finishing in 13th place overall. Gibson was back again to represent Australia at the elite world level in 2014. He competed in the lightweight coxless four at the World Rowing Cup III in Lucerne and then at the 2014 World Championships. In Gibson's last Australian representative appearance the four finished fifth.
