= Roderick Chisholm (rower) =

British lightweight class former rower

Personal information
- Born: 19 June 1974 (age 52) London
- Years active: 1992-2012
- Height: 1.83 m (6 ft 0 in)
- Weight: 72 kg (159 lb)

Sport
- Country: United Kingdom; Australia
- Sport: Rowing
- Event: Men's lightweight double sculls
- Club: Cambridge University; Tideway Scullers; St. George RC, Sydney
Medal record
Men's rowing
Representing Australia
World Championships
Gold medal – first place	2011 Bled	LM8+

Roderick Chisholm (born 19 June 1974) is a British lightweight class former rower who represented both Great Britain and Australia at world championships. He is an Australian national champion, a World Champion and a dual Olympian who competed at the world class level in both sculls and in sweep-oared boats.

== Club and national rowing ==
Chisholm was born in London, United Kingdom and educated at Bedford Modern School. In 1995, he rowed for Cambridge University in the Lightweight Boat Race and won. His club rowing in London was from the Tideway Scullers School where he was club captain.

By 2007, Chisholm had relocated to Australia and was rowing in sweep-oared boats from the St George Rowing Club on the Cooks River in Sydney. In 2007, 2008, 2011 and 2012 Chisholm was selected to represent New South Wales in the men's lightweight four contesting the Penrith Cup at the Interstate Regatta within the Australian Rowing Championships.

He contested national lightweight titles wearing St George Rowing Club colours in Australian selection composites at the Australian Rowing Championships on a number of occasions including a lightweight coxless pair in 2007 and a victorious coxless four in 2007.

== International representative rowing ==
Chisholm was first selected to row for Great Britain at the 2001 World Rowing Cup IV in Munich in a lightweight quad scull which placed 12th. He raced again in the British lightweight quad at the 2003 World Rowing Cup III in Lucerne and finished in 8th place.

In 2004, he represented Great Britain at all three World Rowing Cups in Europe and was selected in the lightweight quad scull to race the 2004 World Rowing Championships in Banyoles, Spain. That quad won the B final and finished in overall seventh place.

He was first selected to row for Australia in sweep-oared boats - a coxless four at the 2007 World Rowing Cup III in Lucerne. That year he raced in the Australian lightweight coxless four at the 2007 World Rowing Championships to a seventh placing. He held his seat in the four into the Olympic year of 2008, contesting two World Rowing Cups (for a bronze medal at WRC III in Poznan) and the 2008 Summer Olympics. At Beijing 2008 in the bow seat of an experienced Australian lightweight four, he placed ninth in tough Olympic competition.

Chisholm took time off after the Olympics but was back in national contention in 2011 and raced in a lightweight coxless pair at the World Rowing Cup III in Lucerne. Australia's lightweight men's eight had been successful at the 2010 World Championships in New Zealand winning a silver medal. Chisholm's opportunity came when Perry Ward and Angus Tyers were changed out and with Tom Gibson, Chisholm was added to the crew. At the 2011 World Rowing Championships in Bled, Slovenia the eight raced their final to perfection coming through the field from the 500mark, sitting second at the 1000 and the 1500, and running down the Italians in the last 200m to take the gold by 0.17seconds, winning Chisholm his first and only World Championship title.

In 2012, at the last ditch Olympic qualification regatta, Chisholm and Gibson qualified an Australian double scull through to the 2012 Summer Olympics in London. They raced in the lightweight double sculls event finishing in 13th place overall. It was Chisholm's last international appearance at the end of a stellar dual-country representative career contesting in five different boat classes.
