= Divinity Road =

Road in Oxford, England

Coordinates: 51.7499°N 1.2250°W

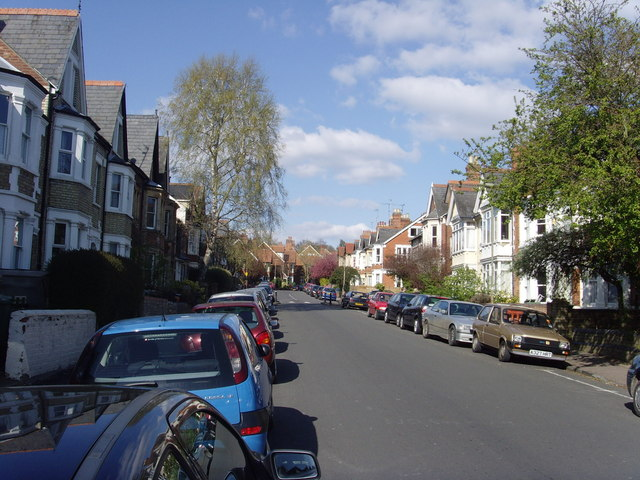
The view looking up Divinity Road.

Divinity Road is a residential road in Oxford, England. It connects with the east end of Morrell Avenue to the northeast and with Cowley Road to the southwest. The road is on a hill sloping southwest.

The road includes detached, semi-detached, and terraced houses. Divinity Road Area Residents' Association (DRARA) is a residents' association in the local area around Divinity Road. The Beeches, student accommodation of Linacre College, Oxford, is located in Divinity Road.

Lily van den Broecke, a gold medalist in the mixed coxed fours event on Dorney Lake at the 2012 Summer Paralympic Games, was a resident of the road in 2012, so a post box in the road was painted gold in her honour. Divinity Road features in the book The Rocktastic Corduroy Peach by Michael Amos.

== Gallery ==
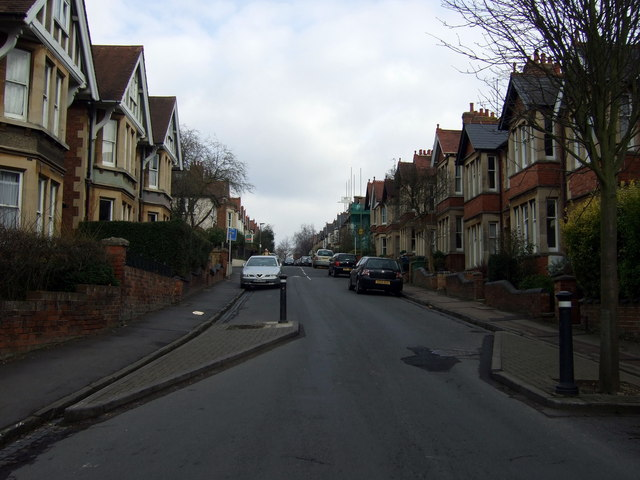
Traffic calming measures in Divinity Road.

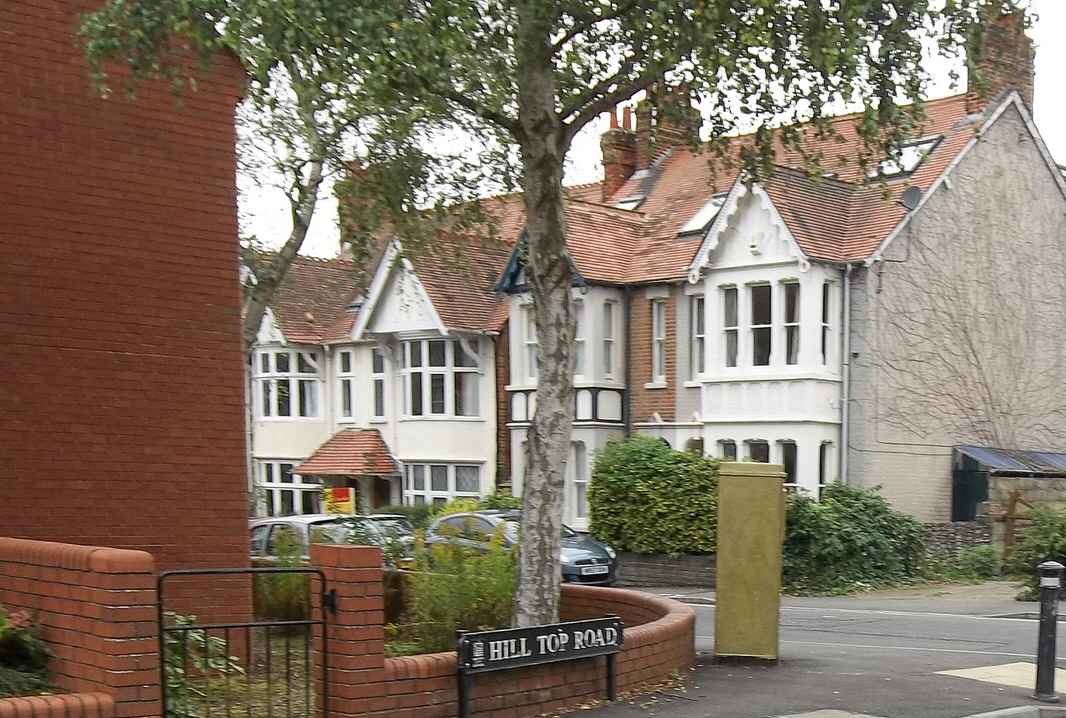
The junction of Divinity Road and Hill Top Road.

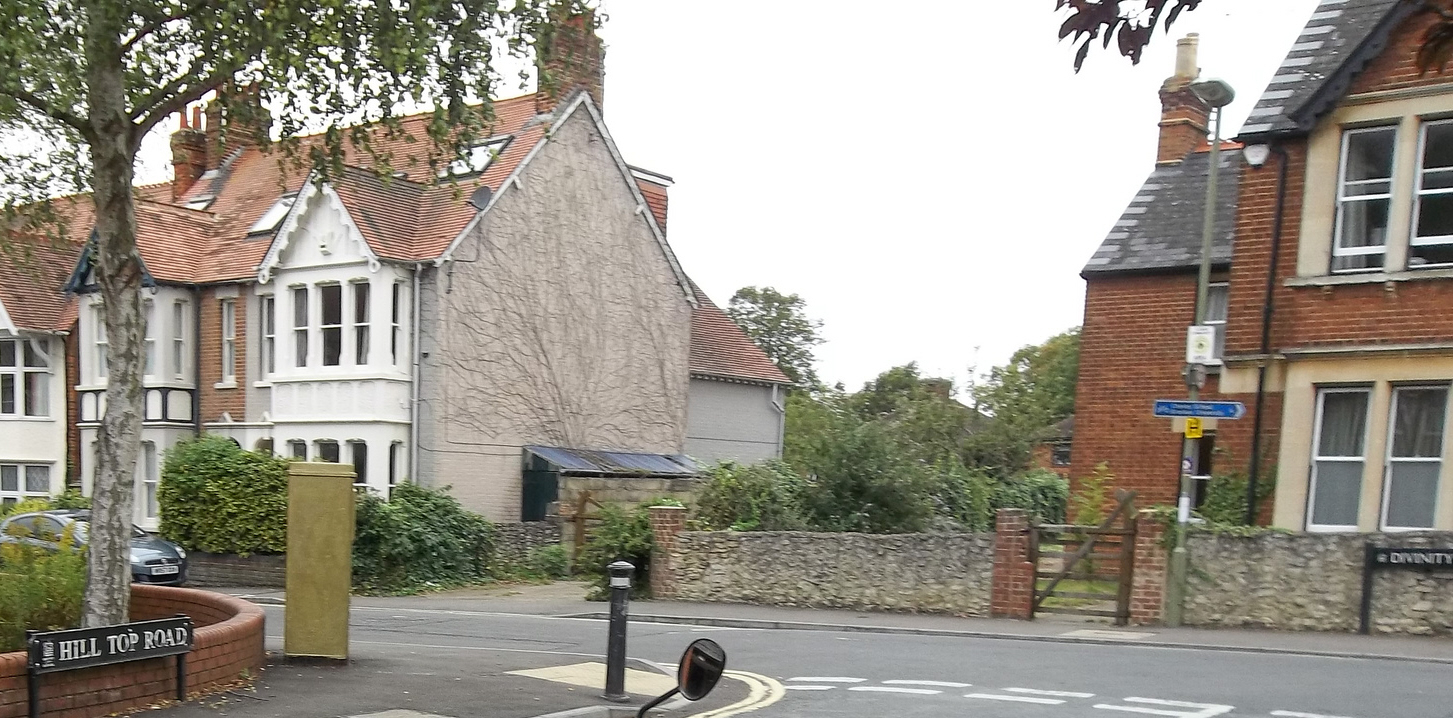
Another view of the junction of Divinity Road and Hill Top Road.

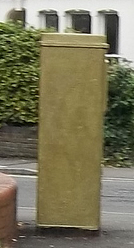
Gold post box for Lily van den Broecke, gold medalist for rowing (mixed coxed fours) at the 2012 Summer Paralympic Games.

== See also ==
- 2012 Summer Olympics and Paralympics gold post boxes
