= Rowing at the 2012 Summer Paralympics – Mixed coxed four =

Mixed coxed four at the XIV Paralympic Games
- Venue: Eton Dorney
- Date: 31 August – 2 September 2012
- Competitors: 60 from 12 nations
- Winning time: 3:19.38

Medalists
1st place, gold medalist(s)		Pam Relph; Naomi Riches; David Smith; James Roe; Lily van den Broecke	Great Britain
2nd place, silver medalist(s)		Anke Molkenthin; Astrid Hengsbach; Tino Kolitscher; Kai Kruse; Katrin Splitt	Germany
3rd place, bronze medalist(s)		Andrii Stelmakh; Kateryna Morozova; Yelena Pukhayeva; Denys Sobol; Volodymyr Kozlov	Ukraine

The mixed coxed four competition at the 2012 Summer Paralympics in London took place at Dorney Lake which, for the purposes of the Games venue, is officially termed Eton Dorney.

== Results ==
=== Heats ===
The winner of each heat qualified to the finals, remainder to the repechage.

==== Heat 1 ====
Rank	Country	Time	Notes
1	Germany	3:15.91	Q
2	Ukraine	3:20.98	R
3	Italy	3:22.46	R
4	China	3:24.82	R
5	Brazil	3:30.99	R
6	Russia	3:42.07	R

==== Heat 2 ====
Rank	Country	Time	Notes
1	Great Britain	3:23.59	Q
2	United States	3:28.36	R
3	Canada	3:29.69	R
4	France	3:32.25	R
5	Ireland	3:33.95	R
6	Belarus	3:45.44	R

=== Repechages ===
First two of each repechage qualified to the medal final, remainder to Final B.

==== Repechage 1 ====
Rank	Country	Time	Notes
1	Ukraine	3:23.53	Q
2	China	3:25.03	Q
3	Canada	3:28.82	Final B
4	Ireland	3:34.85	Final B
5	Russia	3:43.84	Final B

==== Repechage 2 ====
Rank	Country	Time	Notes
1	Italy	3:25.90	Q
2	United States	3:27.41	Q
3	France	3:28.40	Final B
4	Brazil	3:30.28	Final B
5	Belarus	3:40.72	Final B

=== Finals ===
==== Final A ====
Rank	Country	Time
1st place, gold medalist(s)	Great Britain	3:19.38
2nd place, silver medalist(s)	Germany	3:21.44
3rd place, bronze medalist(s)	Ukraine	3:23.22
4	China	3:23.43
5	Italy	3:27.91
6	United States	3:30.06

==== Final B ====
Rank	Country	Time
1	Canada	3:31.17
2	France	3:32.01
3	Brazil	3:36.58
4	Ireland	3:36.72
5	Russia	3:42.73
6	Belarus	3:45.18

== Finals ranking and crews ==
Rank	Country	Bow	Seat 2	Seat 3	Stroke	Cox
1	Great Britain	Pam Relph	Naomi Riches	David Smith	James Roe	Lily van den Broecke
2	Germany	Anke Molkenthin	Astrid Hengsbach	Tino Kolitscher	Kai Kruse	Katrin Splitt
3	Ukraine	Andrii Stelmakh	Kateryna Morozova	Yelena Pukhayeva	Denys Sobol	Volodymyr Kozlov
4	China	Wang Qian	Zhao Hui	Wu Yunlong	Feng Xuebin	Yu Li
5	Italy	Mahila Laura Maria di Battista	Andrea Marcaccini	Pierre Calderoni	Florinda Trombetta	Alessandro Franzetti
6	United States	Andrew Johnson	Dorian Weber	Emma Preuschl	Eleni Englert	Alexandra Stein
7	Canada	Victoria Nolan	Meghan Montgomery	Anthony Theriault	David Blair	Kristen Kit
8	France	Stephanie Merle	Corinne Simon	Remy Taranto	Antoine Jesel	Melanie Lelievre
9	Brazil	Norma Moura	Regiane Silva	Luciano Pires	Jairo Klug	Mauricio Abreu Carlos
10	Ireland	Anne-Marie McDaid	Sarah Caffrey	Shane Ryan	Kevin du Toit	Helen Arbuthnot
11	Russia	Ekaterina Snegireva	Elena Naumova	Viacheslav Makhov	Mikhail Jakovlev	Ksenia Guseva
12	Belarus	Larisa Varona	Aksana Sivitskaya	Pavel Herasimchyk	Ruslan Sivitski	Piotr Piatrynich
