= 2012 Summer Olympics and Paralympics gold post boxes =

Commemorative post boxes in the UK

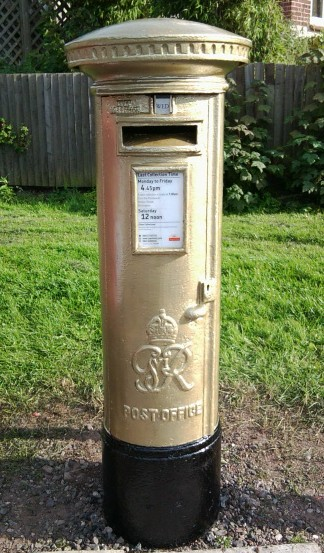
The gold post box in Arleston, Telford, that commemorates the gold medal won by paralympian Mickey Bushell.

To commemorate British gold medal winners at the 2012 Summer Olympics and 2012 Summer Paralympics, various post boxes in the home towns of the medal winners around the United Kingdom, plus one each on Sark and the Isle of Man, were repainted gold. It marked the first occasion in modern times that the colour of post boxes in the United Kingdom had been changed from their traditional red. Originally intended to be a temporary measure, due to the positive public response it was later decided the colour change would become a permanent tribute, with boxes additionally receiving their own special plaques.

== Organisers and timeline ==
The project was organised by Royal Mail Group Communications in-house team, Eulogy and Blonde. Outside the United Kingdom, the Isle of Man Post and Guernsey Post also decided to emulate the Royal Mail scheme when athletes from their territories won gold (one each). The project was launched on 24 July by painting the box at Westminster Abbey, whilst the first athletes' boxes to be painted were in Lossiemouth for Heather Stanning and in Penzance for Helen Glover, to commemorate their medals in the women's coxless pair rowing.

While initially planning to commemorate only Olympic gold medallists, on 15 August 2012, Royal Mail confirmed that gold medallists at the 2012 London Paralympics would also be similarly recognised with boxes and stamps. On 19 September 2012, the Royal Mail relented to public pressure and decided to also commemorate Northern Irish Paralympians who won gold medals while competing for Ireland, reversing their position that "the stamps and gold post boxes were specifically for gold medal winning Olympian and Paralympians who competed for Team GB." On 2 November 2012, it was announced the boxes would retain their new colour permanently, and would also receive a plaque denoting the recipient.

== Colour and precedent ==
According to Royal Mail, the first postboxes (pillar boxes) were erected in the UK in 1853, a year after trial boxes had been erected in Jersey. They were initially painted green, to blend in with the landscape, however between 1874 and 1884 they were repainted bright red to better stand out. This has remained the standard colour, with only a few exceptions, such as blue for Air Mail in the 1930s. Also according to Royal Mail, while gold stamp schemes had been introduced before, the UK is "believed to be the first country to paint post boxes gold to celebrate Olympic and Paralympic gold medal wins".

== Locations ==
Each gold medallist in the 2012 games had a post box painted in recognition of their achievement, usually in their home-town.

=== Great Britain ===
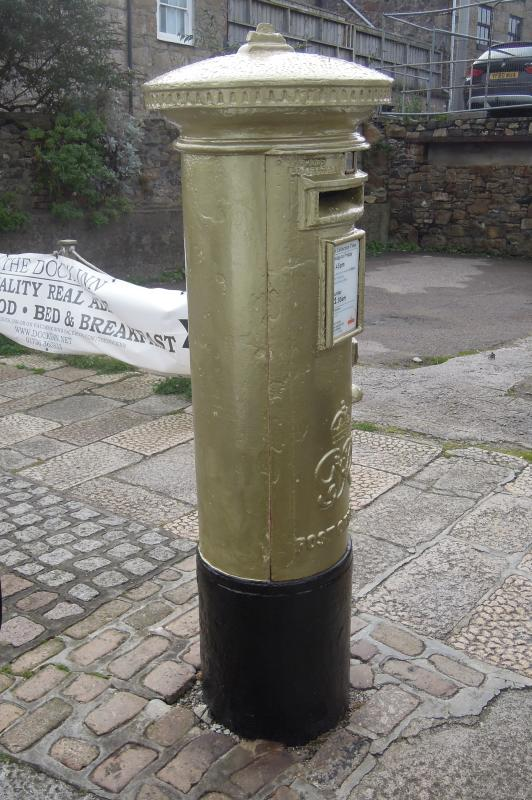
Gold postbox in Penzance, Cornwall honouring Helen Glover

Boxes were painted gold across Great Britain, as far north as Lossiemouth in Scotland, down to the near tip of South West England in Penzance, Cornwall. The actual site of boxes ranges greatly, from rural places such as village greens, to suburban high street locations such as Stratford-upon-Avon, to urban city centres.

=== Northern Ireland ===
Although athletes from Northern Ireland are eligible to compete for both Great Britain (Team GB and ParalympicsGB) and Ireland (Team Ireland and Paralympics Ireland), there were no GB gold medallists from Northern Ireland.

Due to the Royal Mail's decision to recognise Northern Irish medallists competing for Ireland, three Irish gold medal-winning Paralympians were recognised with boxes in Eglinton (Jason Smyth), Glengormley (Michael McKillop) and Seaforde (Bethany Firth), although unlike the GB athletes, the multiple medallists (two each for Smyth and McKillop) did not receive multiple boxes.

=== Sark (Bailiwick of Guernsey) ===
The formerly blue post box on the island of Sark in the Bailiwick of Guernsey was painted gold by Guernsey Post to commemorate Carl Hester's team dressage success.

=== Isle of Man ===
The Isle of Man Post painted one gold box for Peter Kennaugh following his success in the cycling team pursuit.

=== Location disputes ===
In some cases, the locations chosen by Royal Mail for gold boxes were disputed by either the athlete or members of the public as not being appropriate, either because the athlete was more closely associated with another location, or their home town was not as closely located as another location. In some cases, the Royal Mail attributed these errors to Team GB's athlete details database. This variously led to additional boxes being awarded, and in at least one case, a gold box being repainted red.

- For cyclist Joanna Rowsell, the Royal Mail initially painted a box in Carshalton, the location of her birth, however at the request of her family this was repainted red within a few days and replaced by a gold box in nearby Cheam, where she grew up and now lives.
- For sailor Ben Ainslie, the Royal Mail initially painted a box in Restronguet Passage, Cornwall, the place he grew up and learned to sail. A member of the public then painted a box in Lymington High Street, Hampshire, gold, on the basis that Ainslie was a long-time resident and considered a local "legend". After initially filing a complaint, Royal Mail relented to a public campaign and decided to officially paint the Lymington box themselves.
- For canoeist Tim Baillie, the Mail painted a box in his home town of Westhill, Aberdeenshire. After requests from the public, a second box was added, also in Westhill, but in a more central location.
- For equestrian Peter Charles, Royal Mail painted a post box in Paper Mill Lane, Alton, Hampshire. It was soon pointed out that Charles lived in the nearby village of Bentworth (located 4 miles away), rather than the town itself and a second post box was painted accordingly.

== Recipients ==
The majority of boxes were awarded to individual gold medallists, whether they were competing individually or as part of a team/crew. This meant that in several cases, multiple gold medal athletes received multiple boxes in various locations. The highest number awarded was four, for the quadruple gold medallists, Sarah Storey and David Weir.

In variation of the system of awarding one gold box per medal, there were variations on this theme (not counting instances of multiple boxes painted next to each other as a single site):

- Andy Murray, Ben Ainslie, Bradley Wiggins, Heather Stanning, Nick Skelton, Peter Charles and Tim Baillie all received two individual gold boxes at two separate sites, to commemorate a single gold medal.
- Charlotte Dujardin, Chris Hoy, Eleanor Simmonds, Mo Farah, Hannah Cockroft, Jason Kenny and Natasha Baker all received two individual gold boxes at two separate sites, to commemorate two gold medals.
- Laura Trott received three individual gold boxes at three separate sites to commemorate two gold medals. One was initially painted in her birth town of Harlow by mistake, rather than Cheshunt where she grew up and considers her "home town".
- Pete Reed received four individual gold boxes at three separate sites to commemorate one gold medal
- Sophie Christiansen received four individual gold boxes at four separate sites to commemorate three gold medals

In one case, a box was also shared between two athletes – cyclist Craig MacLean initially received one gold box in Grantown-on-Spey, Scotland, to commemorate his single gold medal won as an able-bodied pilot in the Paralympics, while Olympic cyclist Victoria Pendleton also initially received one gold box in Stotfold, Bedfordshire, to commemorate her single gold medal. A third box was later painted in their home town Wilmslow, Cheshire, dedicated to both of them.

In certain other cases, the boxes were awarded to commemorate recipients other than individual athletes:

- Two boxes to commemorate the Olympics (Westminster) and Paralympics (Stoke Mandeville), painted to launch each respective scheme
- A box to commemorate London hosting its third Olympic Games (Stratford)
- A box to commemorate British Cycling (Piccadilly Gardens, Manchester)
- A box to commemorate Henley's rowing clubs (Henley-on-Thames)

The Henley box was awarded to mark the over one hundred Olympic medal winning rowers who have trained at the town's Leander Club.

== Types and cyphers ==
The type of box painted encompasses the wide variety of types in use.

The ubiquitous cylindrical pillar box was represented by both the traditional Type A (narrow) and Type B (wide) versions, plus the newer Type K pillar boxes (both singular and in pairs). The modern square shaped pillar box, the Type G, was also painted (singles and pairs). Various types of wall box were also represented, both installed in buildings, and in self-contained pillars. Representing the pole mounted type were two boxes of the more traditional design (Pete Reed in Watledge Road, Nailsworth and Bethany Firth in Seaforde), as well as a single example of the modern Type M (Tim Baillie, Westhill Drive North). A single example of the rare Penfold type hexagonal pillar box was also painted, for Sophie Wells in Lincoln. The Isle of Man box represents the only Type D painted gold (the D being a Type C oval but with a stamp vending machine), In one case, Nicola Adams' box in Leeds, as well as the post box, an adjacent Franked Mail Only type box was painted.

Reflecting the age range of the boxes painted, there are also a number of different Royal Cyphers, from the then-current Queen Elizabeth II (EIIR), to the historical versions for King Edward VII (EVIIR), King George V (G R) and Queen Victoria (V R). Also represented are Scottish boxes, which simply display the Scots Crown, and also boxes with no cypher at all.

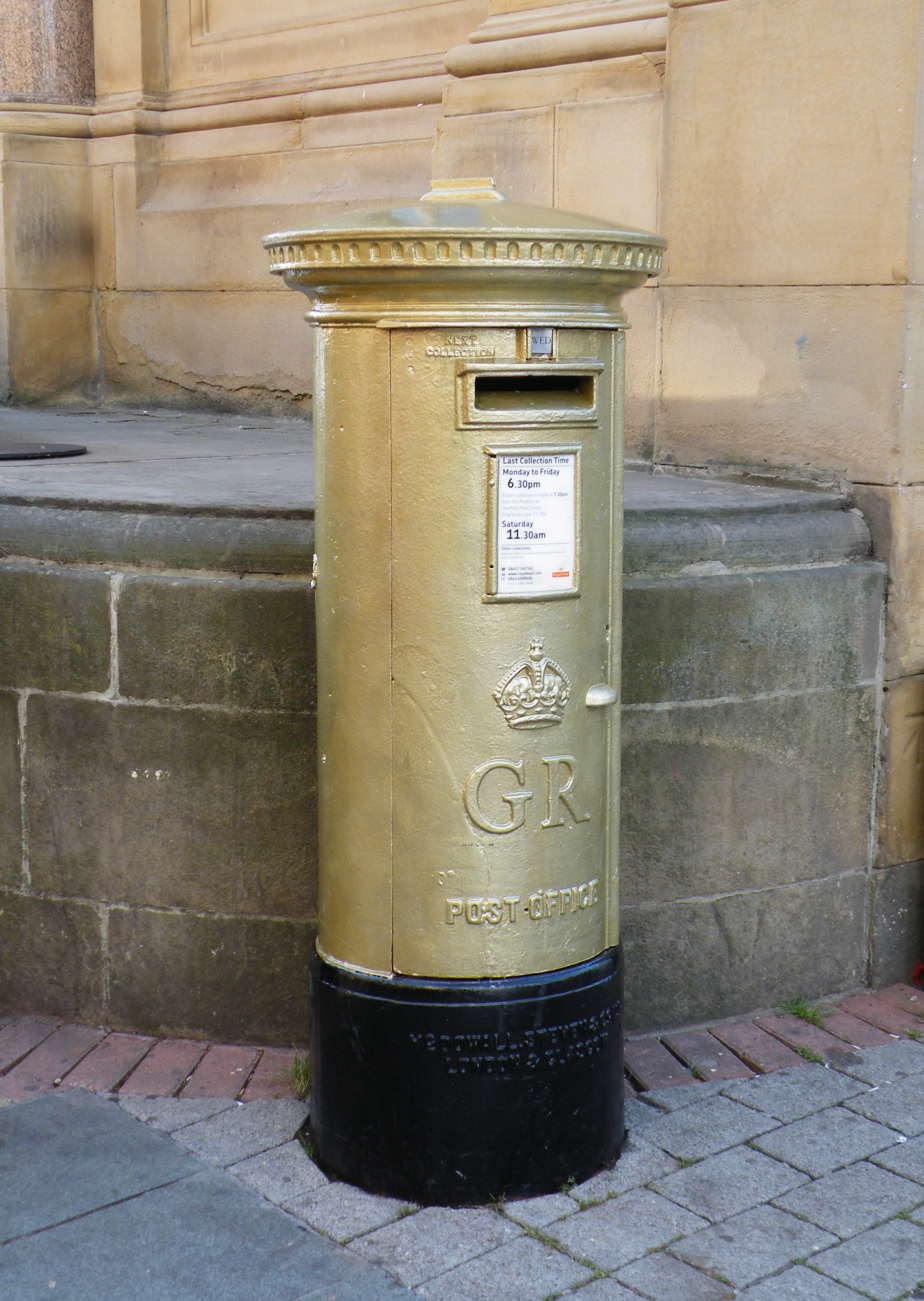
A Type-A pillar box (Sheffield)

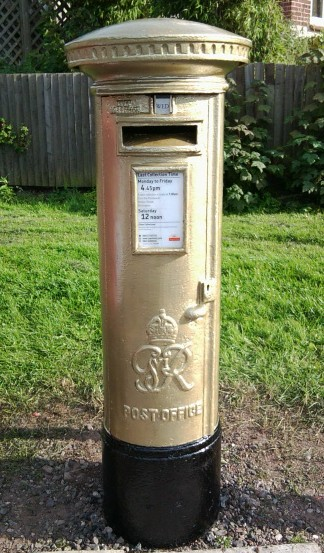
A Type-B pillar box (Arleston)

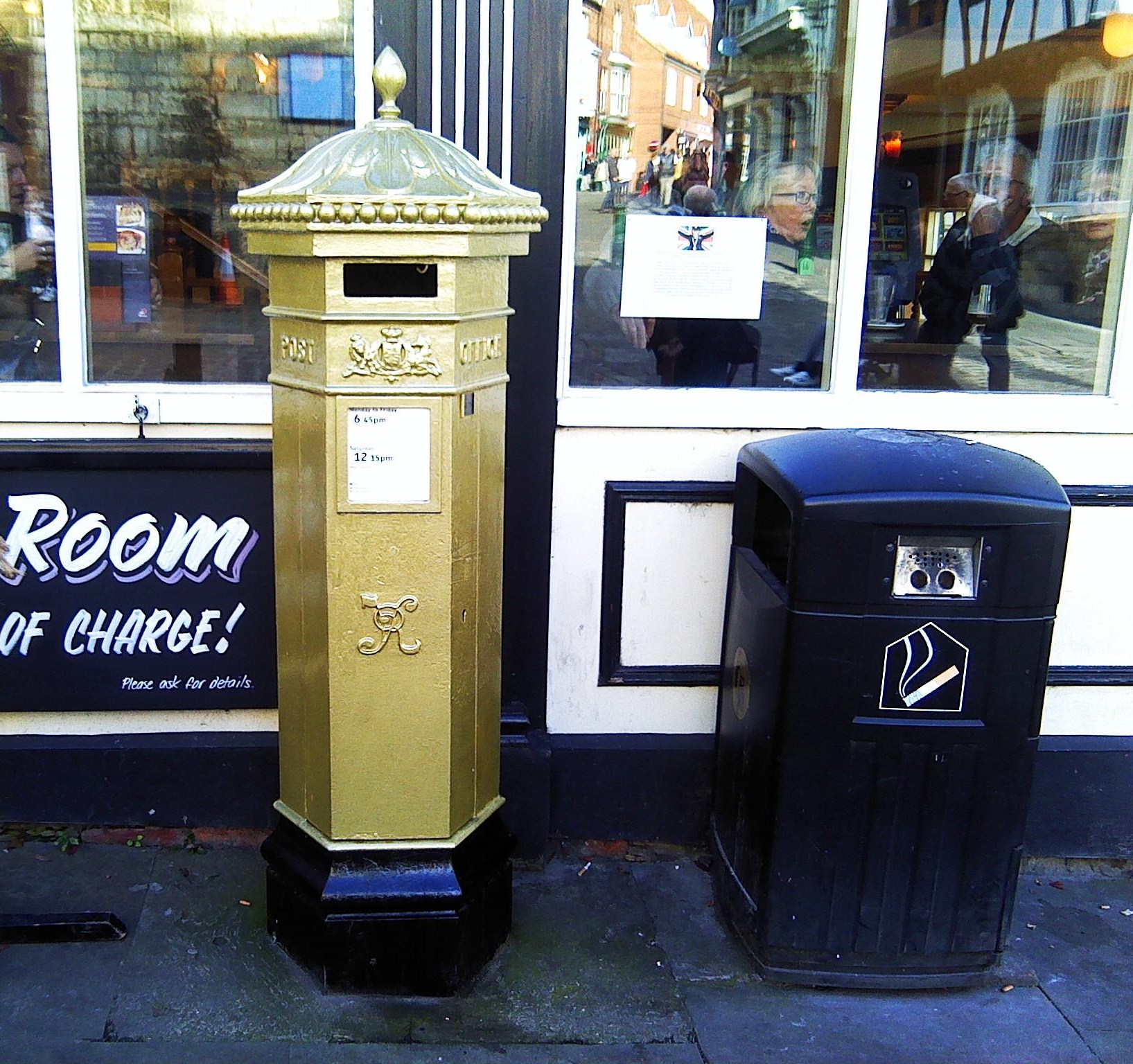
The single Penfold box in Lincoln

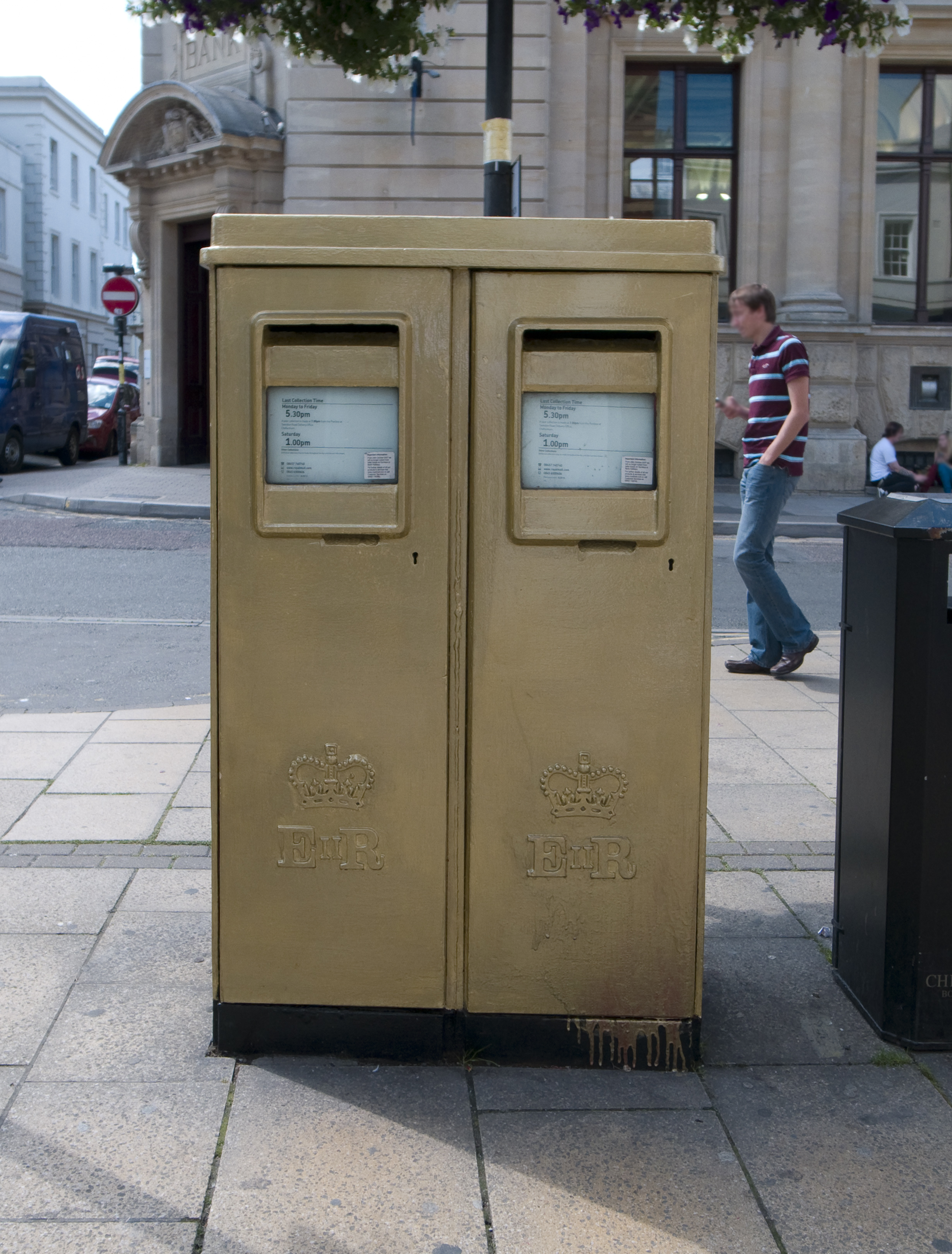
A double G-Type (Cheltenham)

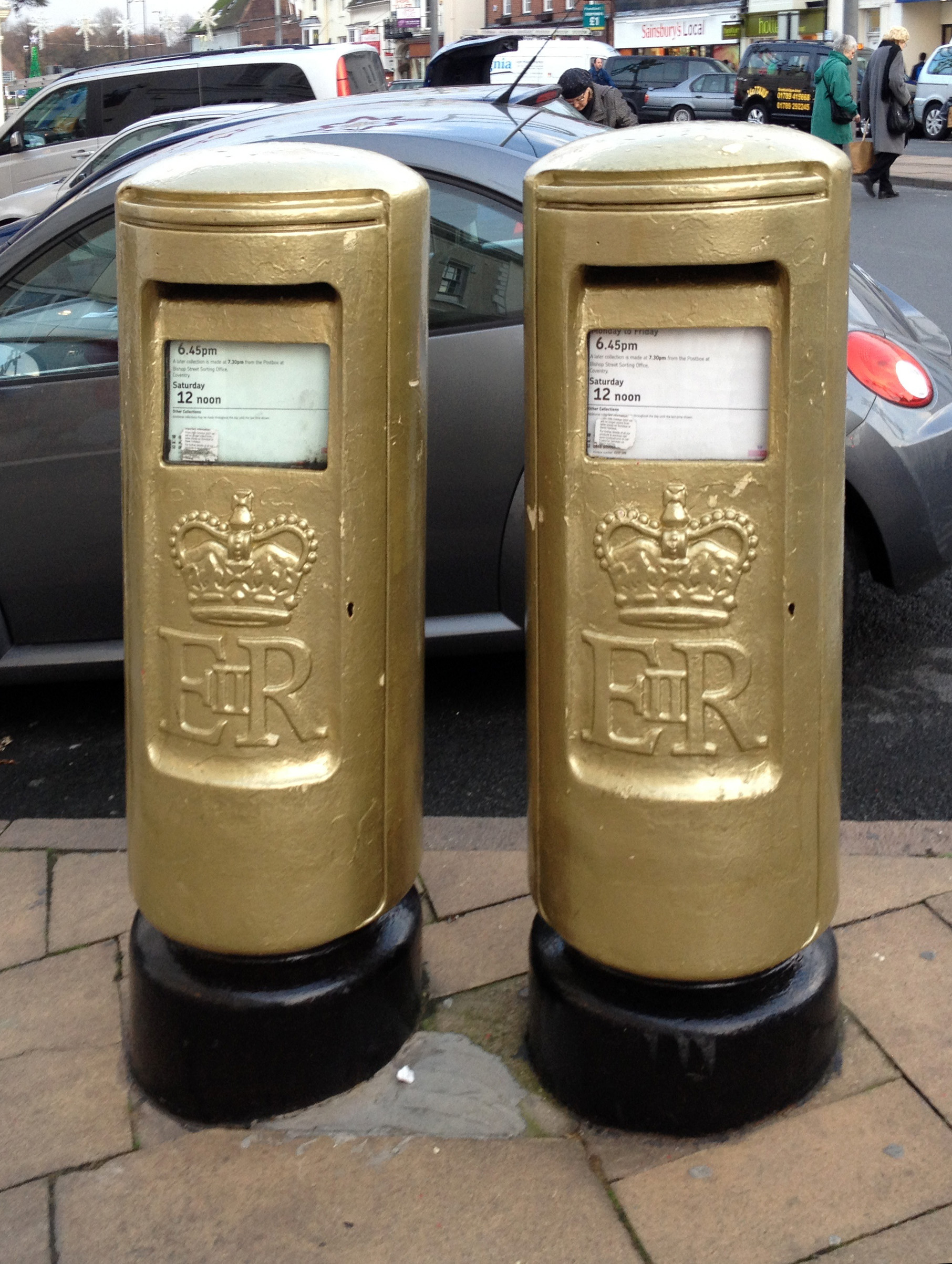
The double-formation K-Type (Stratford-upon-Avon)

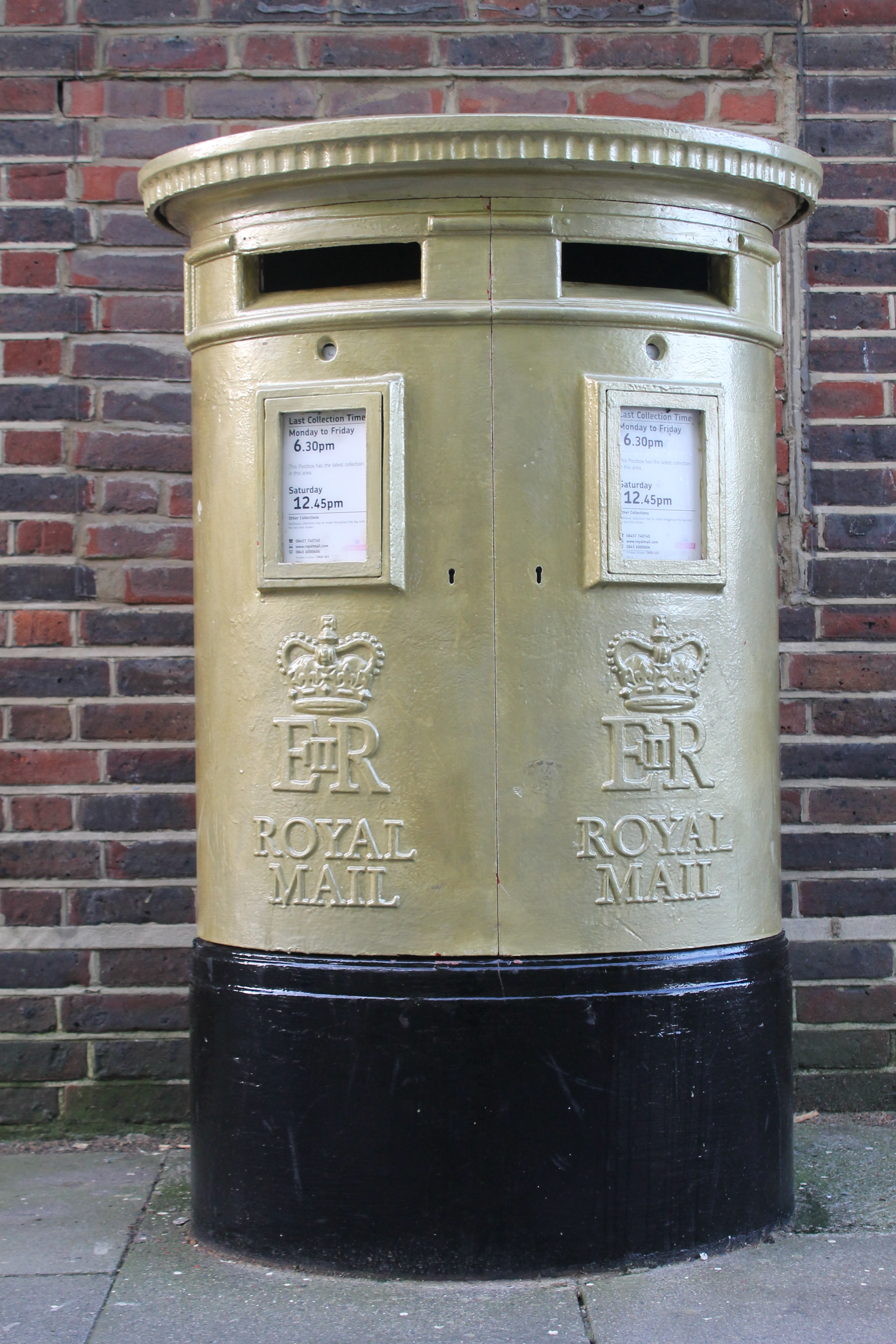
A Type-C oval pillar box (Harlow)

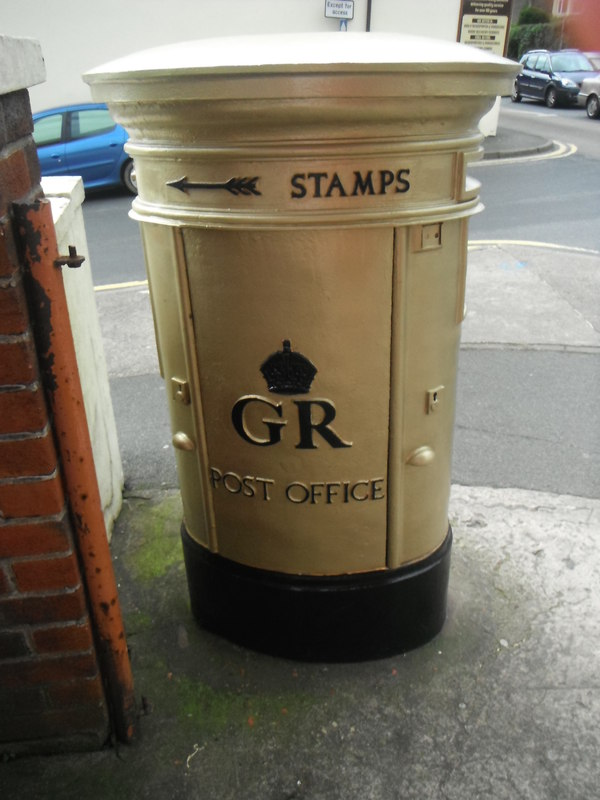
The Type-D oval on the Isle of Man

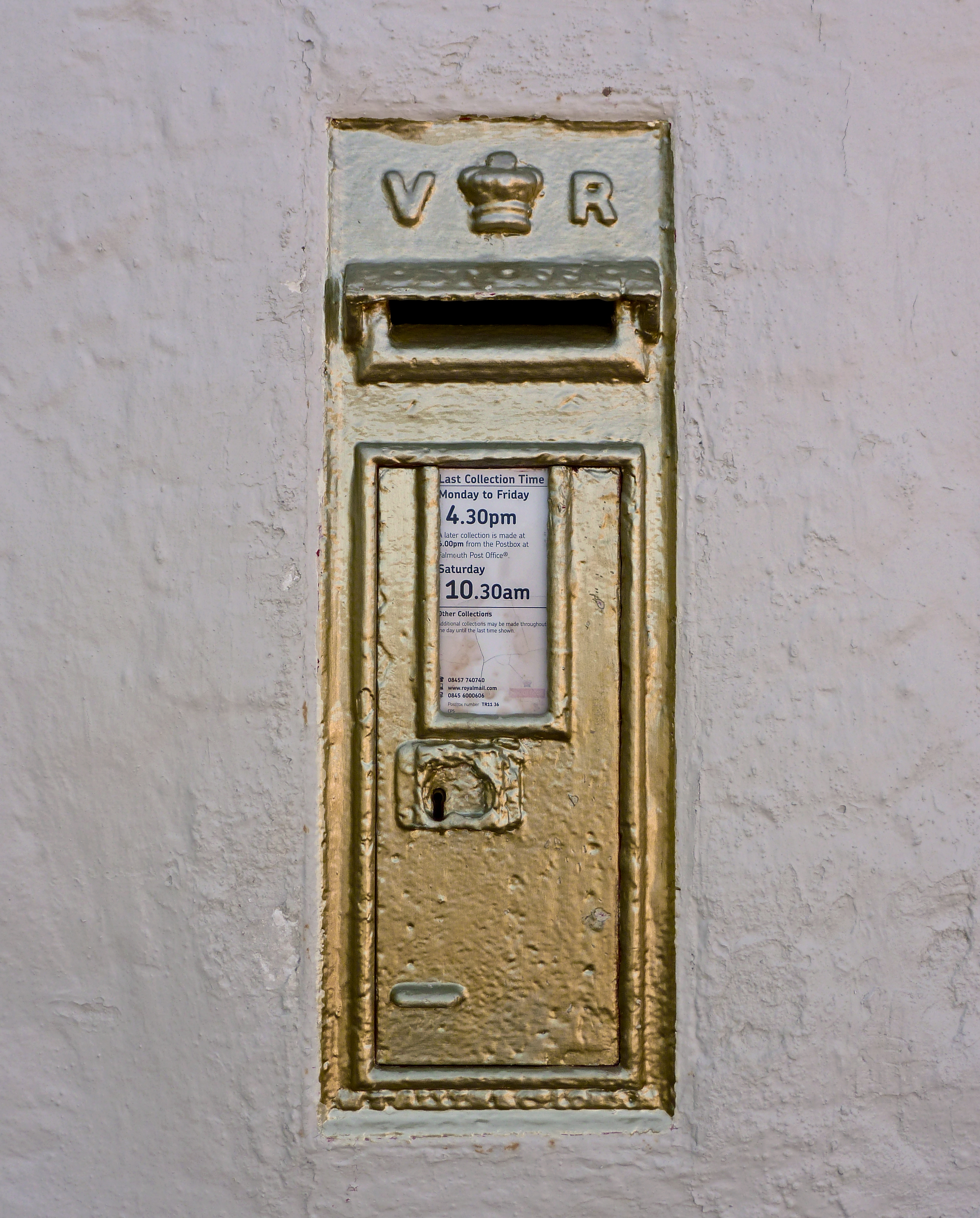
An integrated wall box, mounted in the Pandora Inn, Restronguet Passage

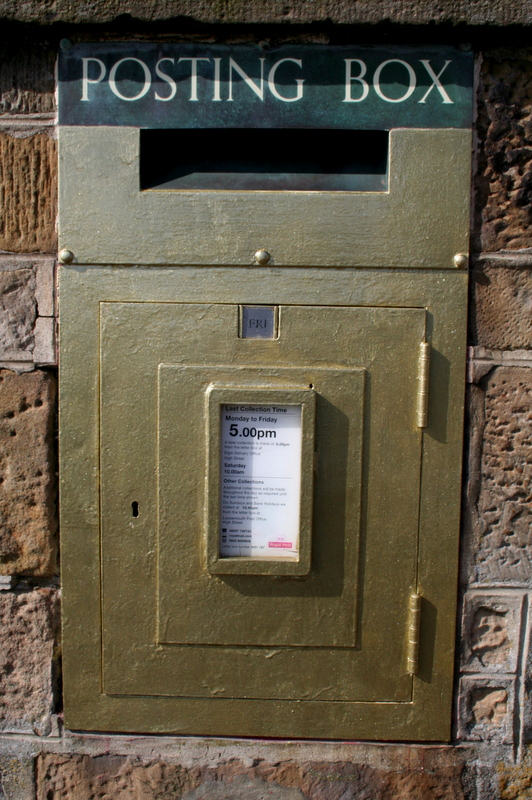
A different wall box type (Lossiemouth)

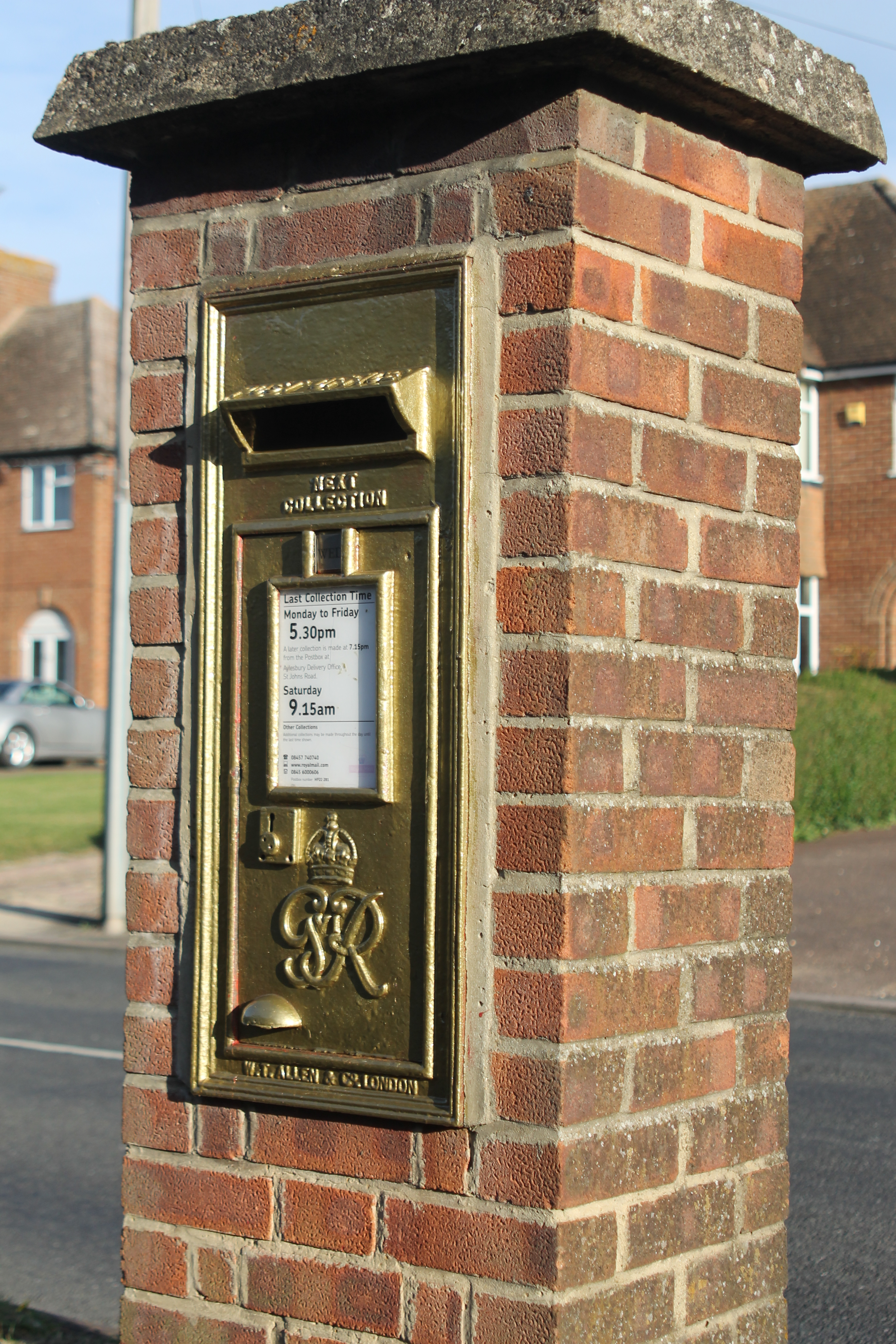
A stand-alone wall box (Turville)

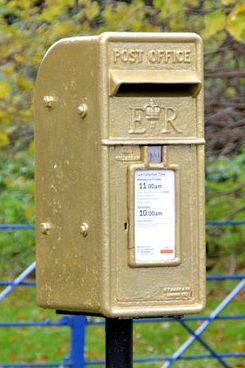
A pole mounted box (Seaforde)

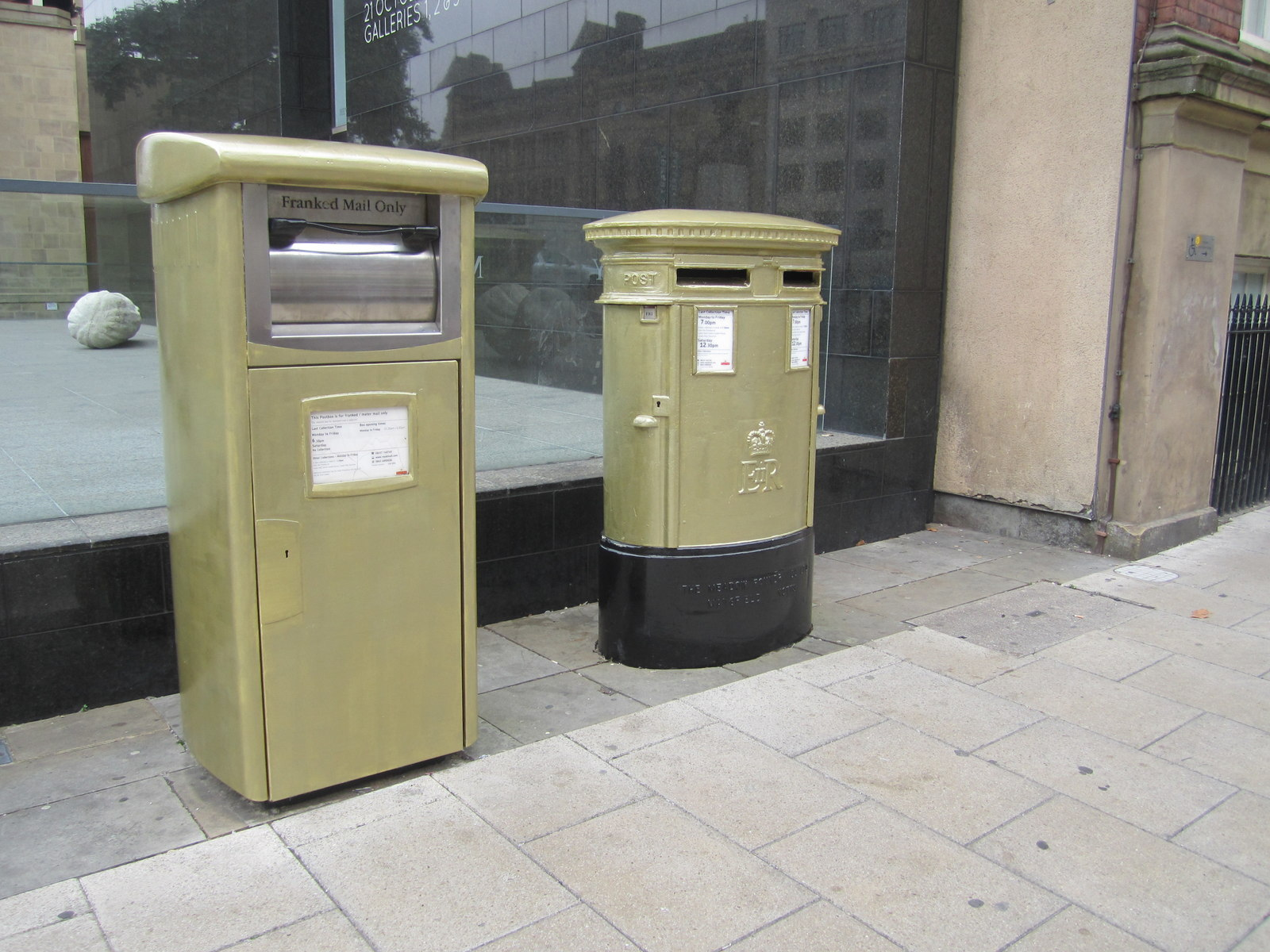
The franking mail and pillar box in Leeds

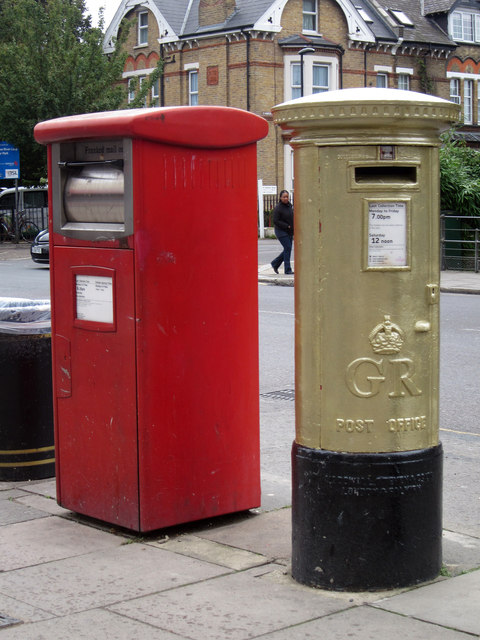
A gold box with red franking mail box (Enfield)

== Tourist attractions ==
The boxes were met with positive public reaction, becoming tourist attractions within their local areas.

== Vandalism and unofficial boxes ==
Several of the official gold post boxes were subsequently vandalised. These included the ones for triathlete Alistair Brownlee, rower Kat Copeland, swimmer Josef Craig, heptathlete Jessica Ennis, and tennis player Andy Murray. Fans picked flecks of paint off Murray's box as souvenirs, while Ennis' box was defaced with the words "Go Jess".

A number of additional post boxes were painted by members of the public to commemorate silver and bronze medallists:

- In Wyke Regis, for silver medallist Nick Dempsey.
- In Doddington, Lincolnshire, for bronze medallist Georgie Twigg
- In Lowestoft, for bronze medallist Anthony Ogogo.

The awarding of an additional box for Ben Ainslie in Lymington was precipitated by an episode of vandalism which saw the perpetrator arrested.

After Lizzy Yarnold's win in the Women's Skeleton during the 2014 Winter Olympics in Sochi, vandals crudely painted a post box gold in her hometown of Sevenoaks, Kent. Despite an online petition attracting 43,000 signatures, Royal Mail rejected demands for an official gold post box to be decorated, declaring that the 2012 Summer Olympics were a 'unique occasion'.

Two unofficial postboxes were positioned outside Home Park, Plymouth; one gold for Lithuanian swimmer Rūta Meilutytė, who is based in the city, and one bronze for diver Tom Daley.

Two unofficial boxes appeared in Posso and Kirkton Manor, both near Peebles in the Scottish borders, which also had its own official box in honour of Scott Brash and one at Stoke in Hayling Island, in honour of 2020 Olympian Eilidh McIntyre.

In addition to the gold post box on Sark for Carl Hester, in 2020 Guernsey Post painted one of their (normally blue) post boxes gold in recognition of Percy Hodge who won a gold medal at the 1920 Olympic Games in Antwerp.

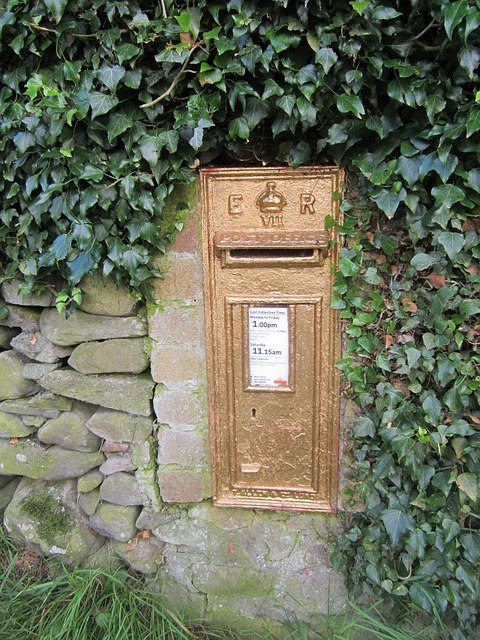
Posso

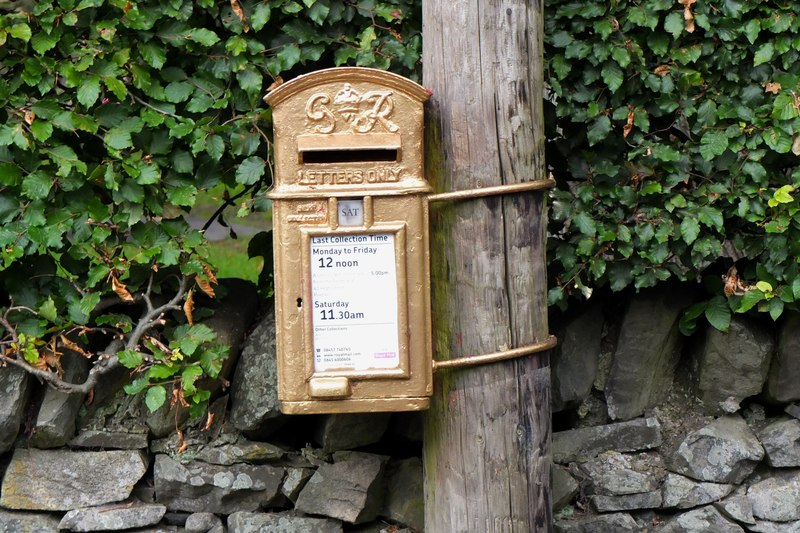
Kirkton Manor

== List of gold postboxes ==
=== Olympian boxes ===
Athlete	Event(s)	Town/City	Address	Coordinates
Nicola Adams	Boxing – Women's flyweight	Leeds	Cookridge Street	53.7999°N 1.5472°W
Ben Ainslie	Sailing – Men's Finn	Restronguet; Lymington	Pandora Inn; High Street, Lymington	50.1948°N 5.0642°W; 50.7589°N 1.5388°W
Tim Baillie	Canoeing – Men's slalom C-2	Westhill; Westhill	Westhill Drive North; Westhill Drive South	57.1595°N 2.2818°W; 57.1538°N 2.2767°W
Laura Bechtolsheimer	Equestrian – Team dressage	Ampney St Peter	High Street	51.7114°N 1.8835°W
Scott Brash	Equestrian – Team jumping	Peebles	41 High Street	55.6515°N 3.1909°W
Alistair Brownlee	Men's triathlon	Horsforth	Craghill Post Office, 77 New Road Side, Horsforth, Leeds LS18 4QD	53.8320°N 1.6408°W
Steven Burke	Cycling – Men's team pursuit	Colne	Albert Road/Crabtree Street	53.8551°N 2.1786°W
Luke Campbell	Boxing – Men's bantamweight	Hull	Hessle Road	53.7351°N 0.3650°W
Peter Charles	Equestrian – Team jumping	Alton; Bentworth	Paper Mill Lane; Holt End Lane	51.1511°N 0.9666°W; 51.1565°N 1.0516°W
Ed Clancy	Cycling – Men's team pursuit	Huddersfield	Railway Street	53.6471°N 1.7842°W
Katherine Copeland	Rowing – Women's lightweight double sculls	Ingleby Barwick	Apsley Way	54.5280°N 1.3265°W
Charlotte Dujardin	Equestrian – Team dressage Equestrian – Individual dressage	Enfield Town; Newent	Southbury Road; Church Street	51.6524°N 0.0788°W; 51.9309°N 2.4035°W
Jessica Ennis	Athletics – Women's heptathlon	Sheffield	Sheffield City Hall	53.3804°N 1.4728°W
Mo Farah	Athletics – Men's 10,000 metres Athletics – Men's 5000 metres	Isleworth; Teddington	Isleworth Post Office, London Road; Broad Street/North Lane	51.4751°N 0.3379°W; 51.4260°N 0.3380°W
GB Cycling	Cycling – British Cycling HQ	Manchester	Piccadilly Gardens	53.4814°N 2.2369°W
Helen Glover	Rowing – Women's coxless pair	Penzance	Quay Street, TR18 4BD	50.1161°N 5.5310°W
Katherine Grainger	Rowing – Women's double sculls	Aberdeen	Castle Street	57.1483°N 2.0922°W
Alex Gregory	Rowing – Men's coxless four	Cheltenham	High Street	51.8997°N 2.0728°W
Henley-on-Thames Rowers	Rowing – Leander Club	Henley-on-Thames	Hart Street	51.5377°N 0.9042°W
Carl Hester	Equestrian – Team dressage	Sark, Guernsey	The Avenue	49.4321°N 2.3565°W
Philip Hindes	Cycling – Men's team sprint	Manchester	Albert Square/Lloyd Street	53.4791°N 2.2460°W
Sophie Hosking	Rowing – Women's lightweight double sculls	Wimbledon	Worple Road	51.42165°N 0.2085°W
Chris Hoy	Cycling – Men's keirin Cycling – Men's team sprint	Edinburgh	Hanover Street/Princes Street; Hunter Square	55.9522°N 3.1965°W; 55.9497°N 3.1878°W
Tom James	Rowing – Men's coxless four	Wrexham	Town Hill Post Office	53.0445°N 2.9944°W
Jade Jones	Taekwondo – Women's 57 kg	Flint	Church Street	53.2485°N 3.1359°W
Anthony Joshua	Boxing – Men's super heavyweight	Watford	High Street	51.6552°N 0.3958°W
Peter Kennaugh	Cycling – Men's team pursuit	Onchan, Isle of Man	Main Road/Kelvin Road	54.1741°N 4.4555°W
Jason Kenny	Cycling – Men's team sprint Cycling – Men's individual sprint	Bolton	Deansgate; Churchgate	53.5792°N 2.4324°W; 53.5796°N 2.4258°W
Dani King	Cycling – Women's team pursuit	Hamble-le-Rice	High Street	50.8590°N 1.3150°W
Ben Maher	Equestrian – Team jumping	Elsenham	Robin Hood Road	51.9142°N 0.2292°E
Ed McKeever	Canoeing – Men's K-1 200 metres	Bradford on Avon	The Shambles	51.3478°N 2.2509°W
Andy Murray	Tennis – Men's singles	Dunblane; Wimbledon	High Street; Church Road	56.1883°N 3.9641°W; 51.4303°N 0.2124°W
Olympic Village	2012 Summer Olympics	Stratford	Post Office, Broadway	51.5405°N 0.0007°E
Victoria Pendleton	Cycling – Women's keirin	Stotfold; Wilmslow	Brook Street; Alderley Road	52.0140°N 0.2359°W; 53.3261°N 2.2312°W
Pete Reed	Rowing – Men's coxless four	Chiswick; Nailsworth; Nailsworth	Heathfield Terrace, Chiswick; Old Market, Nailsworth; Watledge Road, Nailsworth	51.4913°N 0.2658°W; 51.6956°N 2.2190°W; 51.7004°N 2.2209°W
Joanna Rowsell	Cycling – Women's team pursuit	Cheam Carshalton	Ewell Road Carshalton Road/Cambridge Road (Box repainted red on request by family for gold box in Cheam)	51.3576°N 0.2175°W 51.3630°N 0.1716°W
Greg Rutherford	Athletics – Men's long jump	Milton Keynes	Silbury Boulevard	52.0444°N 0.7571°W
Nick Skelton	Equestrian – Team jumping	Alcester; Bedworth	High Street; High Street	52.2140°N 1.8703°W; 52.4788°N 1.4719°W
Heather Stanning	Rowing – Women's coxless pair	Lossiemouth	Clifton Road West, IV31 6DP	57.7202°N 3.2809°W
Etienne Stott	Canoeing – Men's double canoe slalom	Bedford	St Paul's Square MK40 1SQ	52.1351°N 0.4681°W
Geraint Thomas	Cycling – Men's team pursuit	Cardiff	Castle Street	51.4810°N 3.1820°W
Andrew Triggs-Hodge	Rowing – Men's coxless four	Hebden	Main Street	54.0638°N 1.9616°W
Laura Kenny	Cycling – Women's team pursuit Cycling – Women's omnium	Cheshunt; Cheshunt; Harlow	College Road; Cadmore Lane Post Office Road	51.7022°N 0.0355°W 51.7090°N 0.0295°W; 51.7719°N 0.0940°E
Anna Watkins	Rowing – Women's double sculls	Leek	Derby Street	53.1057°N 2.0247°W
Bradley Wiggins	Cycling – Men's road time trial	Eccleston; Chorley	Carrington Centre; Chorley Centre, Market Street	53.6461°N 2.7239°W; 53.6540°N 2.6326°W
Westminster Abbey	Project launch	Westminster Abbey	Tothill Street	51.4996°N 0.1298°W
Peter Wilson	Shooting – Men's double trap	Sherborne	Cheap Street	50.9486°N 2.5162°W

=== Paralympian boxes ===
Key

* Athlete competed for Ireland

Athlete	Event	City	Address	Coordinates
Jessica-Jane Applegate	Swimming – Women's 200-metre freestyle S14	Belton with Browston	Station Road South	52.5645°N 1.6589°E
Natasha Baker	Equestrian – Individual championship test grade II; Equestrian – Individual freestyle test grade II	Uxbridge; Cowley, London	High Street; Church Road	51.5461°N 0.4793°W; 51.5277°N 0.4743°W
Danielle Brown	Archery – Women's individual compound	Skipton	Swadford Street	53.9602°N 2.0185°W
Mickey Bushell	Athletics – Men's 100 metres T53	Telford	Arleston Lane	52.6955°N 2.4992°W
Sophie Christiansen	Equestrian – Individual championship test grade Ia; Equestrian – Team; Equestrian – Individual freestyle test grade Ia	Fulmer; Sunningdale; Maidenhead; Egham	Black Horse Pub, Windmill Road; London Road; High Street; Royal Holloway College	51.5612°N 0.5604°W; 51.3928°N 0.6290°W; 51.5228°N 0.7197°W; 51.4257°N 0.5682°W
Hannah Cockroft	Athletics – Women's 100m – T34; Athletics – Women's 200m – T34	Halifax; Halifax	Town Hall, Crossley Street; Mount Tabor Road	53.7241°N 1.8605°W; 53.7406°N 1.9196°W
Mark Colbourne	Cycling – Men's individual pursuit	Tredegar,	Commercial Street	51.7756°N 3.2462°W
Josef Craig	Swimming – Men's 400-metre freestyle S7	Jarrow	Grange Road	54.9813°N 1.4896°W
Deborah Criddle	Equestrian – Team	Trull	Church Road	50.9944°N 3.1217°W
Aled Davies	Athletics – Men's discus throw F42	Bridgend	Gentle Way	51.5017°N 3.6012°W
Neil Fachie	Cycling – Men's individual sprint B	Aberdeen	Golden Square	57.1462°N 2.1053°W
Bethany Firth*	Swimming – Women's 100-metre backstroke S14	Seaforde, County Down	Newcastle Road	54.3064°N 5.8411°W
Jonathan Fox	Swimming – Men's 100-metre backstroke S7	St Stephen-in-Brannel	Fore Street	50.3437°N 4.8908°W
Heather Frederiksen	Swimming – Women's 100-metre backstroke S8	Leigh	Market Street	53.4981°N 2.5189°W
Oliver Hynd	Swimming – Men's 200-metre individual medley SM8	Kirkby-in-Ashfield	Chapel Street	53.1009°N 1.2640°W
Anthony Kappes	Cycling – Men's sprint	Chapel-en-le-Frith	Market Street	53.3248°N 1.9086°W
Helena Lucas	Sailing – One Person Keelboat – 2.4 Metre	Easton	Pound Piece	50.542657°N 2.444399°W
Craig MacLean	Cycling – Men's sprint	Grantown-on-Spey; Wilmslow	High Street, A939; Alderley Road	57.3306°N 3.6086°W; 53.3261°N 2.2312°W
Michael McKillop*	Athletics – Men's 800 metres T37; Athletics – Men's 1500 metres T37	Glengormley	Sandyknowes Roundabout	54.6763°N 5.9705°W
Jonnie Peacock	Athletics – Men's 100 metres T44	Doddington	New Street	52.4959°N 0.0600°E
Josie Pearson	Athletics – Women's discus throw F51/52/53	Hay-on-Wye	Church Street	52.0732°N 3.1281°W
Lee Pearson	Equestrian – Team	Bagnall	School Road	53.0555°N 2.1083°W
Pam Relph	Rowing – Mixed coxed four	Weston Turville	Main Street, (Brick pillar)	51.7899°N 0.7627°W
Naomi Riches	Rowing – Mixed coxed four	Marlow	High Street	51.5706°N 0.7756°W
James Roe	Rowing – Mixed coxed four	Stratford-upon-Avon	Bridge Street	52.1928°N 1.7060°W
Ellie Simmonds	Swimming – Women's 400m freestyle S6; Swimming – Women's 200-metre individual medley SM6	Aldridge; Swansea	High Street; Trawler Road	52.6050°N 1.9155°W; 51.6148°N 3.9385°W
David Smith	Rowing – Mixed coxed four	Aviemore	Grampian Road	57.1925°N 3.8285°W
Jason Smyth*	Athletics – Men's 100 metres T13; Athletics – Men's 200 metres T13	Eglinton	Woodvale Road	55.0267°N 7.1789°W
Stoke Mandeville Hospital	2012 Summer Paralympics	Aylesbury	National Spinal Injuries Centre, Entrance 3, Lower Road	51.7976°N 0.8054°W
David Stone	Cycling – Mixed road race T1-2	Rawdon	Town Street	53.8499°N 1.6716°W
Sarah Storey	Cycling – Women's individual pursuit C5; Cycling – Women's 500m time trial C4-5; Cycling – Women's road time trial C5; Cycling – Women's road race C4–5	Disley; Poynton; Eccles; Macclesfield	Buxton Road; Poynton High School; Gilda Brook Road; Market Place	53.3591°N 2.0305°W; 53.3452°N 2.1119°W; 53.4890°N 2.3265°W; 53.2614°N 2.1255°W
Barney Storey	Cycling – Men's individual sprint B	Disley	Market Street	53.3594°N 2.0377°W
Lily van den Broecke	Rowing – Mixed coxed four	Oxford	Divinity Road	51.7499°N 1.2250°W
David Weir	Athletics – Men's 5000 metres Athletics – Men's 1500 metres T54; Athletics – Men's 800 metres T54; Athletics – Men's marathon	Wallington; Wallington; Wallington; Wallington	Woodcote Road; Mollison Square; Foresters Drive; Mollison Drive	51.358757°N 0.149732°W; 51.3533°N 0.1345°W; 51.3531°N 0.1376°W; 51.3541°N 0.1292°W
Sophie Wells	Equestrian – Team	Lincoln	Exchequergate	53.2344°N 0.5385°W
Richard Whitehead	Athletics – Men's 200 metres T42	Lowdham	Main Street	53.0120°N 1.0048°W

== Stamps ==
In addition to the post boxes a first class stamp depicting each medal-winning individual or team was produced.

== See also ==
- Olympic Oaks
- Great Britain at the 2012 Summer Olympics
- Great Britain at the 2012 Summer Paralympics
- Ireland at the 2012 Summer Olympics
- Ireland at the 2012 Summer Paralympics
- 2012 Summer Olympics
- 2012 Summer Paralympics
