= Anne-Marie McDaid =

Irish rower

Anne-Marie McDaid is an Irish rower from Ramelton, Co. Donegal. She represented Ireland in the 2012 Summer Paralympics, where they came tenth in the mixed coxed four.

She was part of the team that came fifth at both the 2010 World Rowing Championships in New Zealand and the 2011 World Rowing Championships in Slovenia. They also won bronze at the 2011 World Cup in Varese, Italy.

The team included noted professional rowing coxswain Helen Arbuthnot. They were the first Irish boat to compete at the Paralympic games.

McDaid is the only known person to suffer from both multiple sclerosis and the rare adrenal gland disorder, Addison's disease.
