= Rowing at the 2012 Summer Paralympics =

Rowing at the XIV Paralympic Games
- Venue: Dorney Lake
- Dates: 31 August – 2 September 2012
- Competitors: 96 from 23 nations

Rowing competitions at the 2012 Summer Paralympics in London were held from 31 August to 2 September 2012, at Dorney Lake which, for the purposes of the Games venue, is officially termed Eton Dorney.

== Classification ==
Rowers are given a classification depending on the type and extent of their disability. The classification system allows rowers to compete against others with a similar level of function.

The three rowing classes are:

- LTA (Legs, Trunk and Arms) - Mixed coxed fours
- TA (Trunk and Arms) - Mixed double sculls
- AS (Arms and shoulders) - Men's and women's singles

== Events ==
Four rowing events are scheduled to be held, each over a course of 1000 metres:

- Men's single sculls AS
- Women's single sculls AS
- Mixed double sculls TA
- Mixed four coxed LTA

== Participating nations ==
96 rowers (48 male, 48 female) from 23 nations including 12 coxswains (5 male, 7 female) from 12 nations took part in this sport.

- Argentina (1)
- Australia (3)
- Belarus (8)
- Brazil (9)
- Canada (6)
- China (8)
- France (8)
- Germany (6)
- Great Britain (8)
- Hungary (1)
- Ireland (5)
- Israel (3)
- Italy (7)
- Japan (1)
- New Zealand (1)
- Poland (3)
- Portugal (1)
- Russia (8)
- South Africa (1)
- South Korea (2)
- Spain (1)
- Ukraine (9)
- United States (8)

== Medalists ==
Event	Gold	Silver	Bronze
Men's single sculls	Cheng Huang; China	Erik Horrie; Australia	Aleksey Chuvashev; Russia
Women's single sculls	Alla Lysenko; Ukraine	Nathalie Benoit; France	Liudmila Vauchok; Belarus
Mixed double sculls	China (CHN); Lou Xiaoxian; Fei Tianming	France (FRA); Perle Bouge; Stephane Tardieu	United States (USA); Oksana Masters; Rob Jones
Mixed coxed four	Great Britain (GBR); Pam Relph; Naomi Riches; David Smith; James Roe; Lily van den Broecke (Cox)	Germany (GER); Anke Molkenthin; Astrid Hengsbach; Tino Kolitscher; Kai Kruse; Katrin Splitt (Cox)	Ukraine (UKR); Andrii Stelmakh; Kateryna Morozova; Olena Pukhaieva; Denys Sobol; Volodymyr Kozlov (Cox)

== See also ==
- Rowing at the 2012 Summer Olympics
