= James Roe (rower) =

British rower

James Roe MBE
Personal information
- Nationality: British
- Born: 28 March 1988 (age 38)

Sport
- Country: United Kingdom
- Sport: Adaptive rowing
Medal record
Adaptive rowing
Representing Great Britain
Paralympic Games
Gold medal – first place	2012 London	LTA coxed four
World Championships
Gold medal – first place	2009 Poznań	LTA coxed four
Gold medal – first place	2011 Bled	LTA coxed four
Silver medal – second place	2010 Cambridge	LTA coxed four

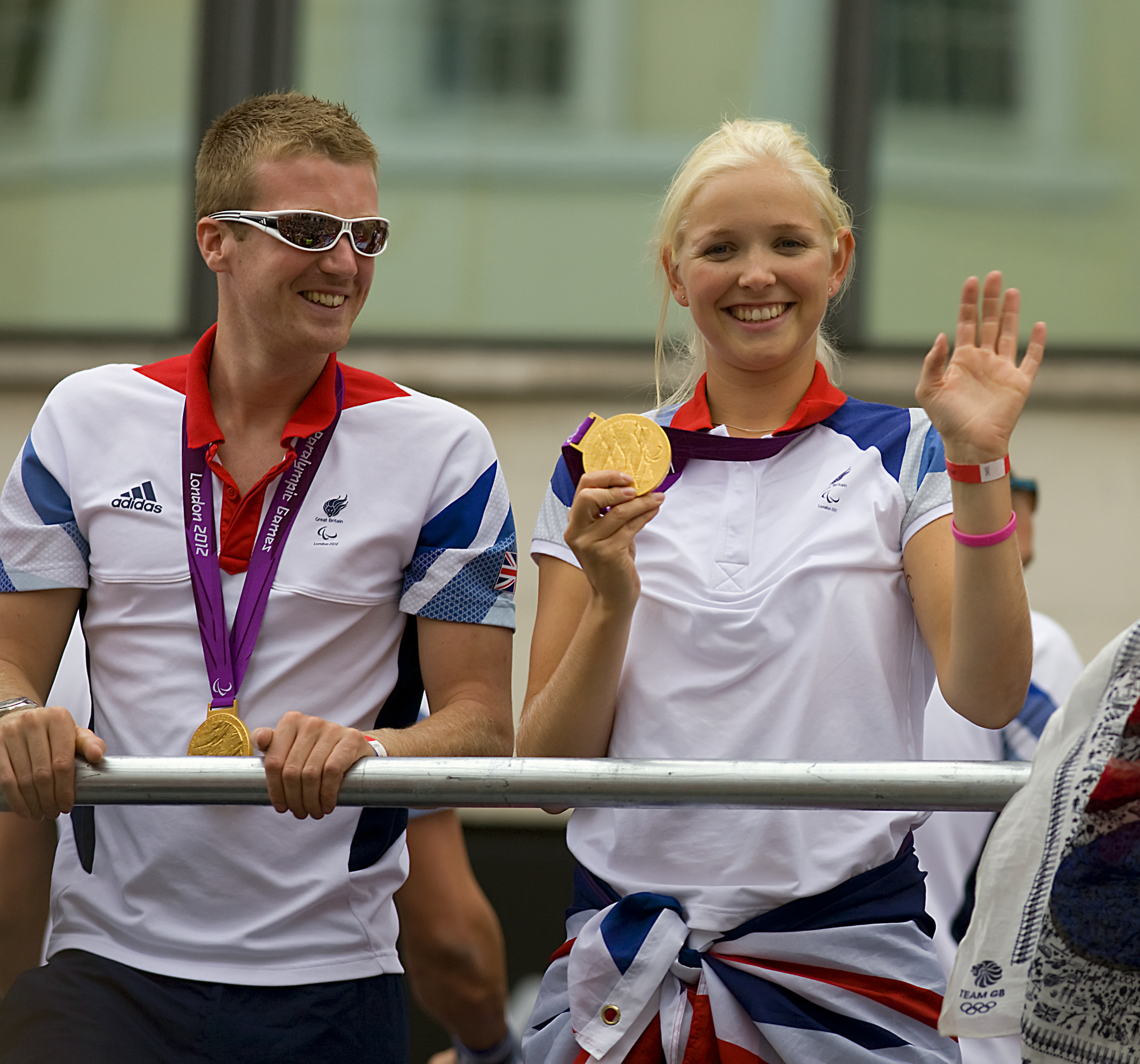
James Roe & Pam Relph at the Our Greatest Team Parade

James Roe MBE (born 28 March 1988) is a British adaptive rower. He was part of the mixed coxed team that won gold at both the 2011 World Rowing Championships and the 2012 Summer Paralympics.

== Personal life ==
Roe was born on 28 March 1988 in Stratford-upon-Avon, Warwickshire, England. He is visually impaired.

In 2009 he graduated from Oxford Brookes University with a Bachelor of Arts degree in Fine Art.

== Rowing ==
Roe started rowing when he joined his local club (Stratford Upon-Avon Boat Club) at the age of 12. He competes in the legs, trunks and arms adaptive mixed coxed four (LTAMix4+) event and won a gold medal at the 2009 World Rowing Championships, alongside Vicky Hansford, David Smith, Naomi Riches and cox Rhiannon Jones. At the 2010 World Rowing Championships held at Lake Karapiro, New Zealand he won a silver medal with Smith, Riches, Ryan Chamberlain and Jones.

In 2011 he competed at the World Rowing Championships held at Lake Bled, Bled, Slovenia. He won the gold medal in the LTAMix4+ event alongside crewmates Pam Relph, Naomi Riches, David Smith and cox, Lily van den Broecke. They completed the one kilometre course in a time of three minutes, 27.10 seconds, finishing nearly five seconds ahead of runners-up Canada. The result qualified a boat for Great Britain into the 2012 Summer Paralympics in London. The crew repeated their gold medal result at the Munich World Cup event in 2012.

Roe was selected along with Relph, Riches, Smith, and van den Broeke, to compete for Great Britain at the 2012 Summer Paralympics in the mixed coxed four event. The crew took gold at Eton Dorney on 2 September.

Roe was appointed Member of the Order of the British Empire (MBE) in the 2013 New Year Honours for services to rowing.

== See also ==
- 2012 Olympics gold post boxes in the United Kingdom
