= Naomi Riches =

British rower (born 1983)

Personal information
- Full name: Naomi Joy Riches
- Nationality: British
- Born: 15 June 1983 (age 43)

Sport
- Country: United Kingdom
- Sport: Adaptive rowing
Medal record
Pararowing
Representing Great Britain
Paralympic Games
Gold medal – first place	2012 London	LTA coxed four
Bronze medal – third place	2008 Beijing	LTA coxed four
World Championships
Gold medal – first place	2004 Banyoles	LTA coxed four
Gold medal – first place	2005 Kaizu	LTA coxed four
Gold medal – first place	2006 Dorney	LTA coxed four
Gold medal – first place	2009 Poznań	LTA coxed four
Gold medal – first place	2011 Bled	LTA coxed four
Gold medal – first place	2013 Chungju	LTA coxed four
Silver medal – second place	2007 Oberschleißheim	LTA coxed four

Naomi Joy Riches MBE, DL (born on 15 June 1983) is a British adaptive rower who won a bronze medal at the 2008 Summer Paralympics and a gold medal at the 2012 Summer Paralympics.

== Personal life ==
Riches was born on 15 June 1983 in Hammersmith, London, England. She attended Cannon Lane school as a child. She is registered blind and is classified for competition in the B3 category. She competed for Harrow in the London Youth Games as a disability swimmer. At the age of 12 she was a National Disabled Swimming champion.

She attended the Royal National Institute for the Blind (RNIB) College in Worcester. She graduated from Buckinghamshire New University with a Bachelor of Arts degree in metalwork and jewellery design.

Riches currently works for a psychometric assessment provider as a sport and education consultant.

== Rowing ==
Riches took up rowing whilst at the RNIB College in Worcester. She competes in the legs, trunks and arms adaptive mixed coxed four (LTAMix4+) event. She won gold medals in the event at the 2004, 2005 and 2006 World Rowing Championships and won silver in 2007.

She was selected to represent Great Britain at the 2008 Summer Paralympics held in Beijing, China, as rowing made its debut at the Games. Competing with Alastair McKean, Vicki Hansford, and James Morgan, along with cox Alan Sherman she won a bronze medal in the mixed coxed four.

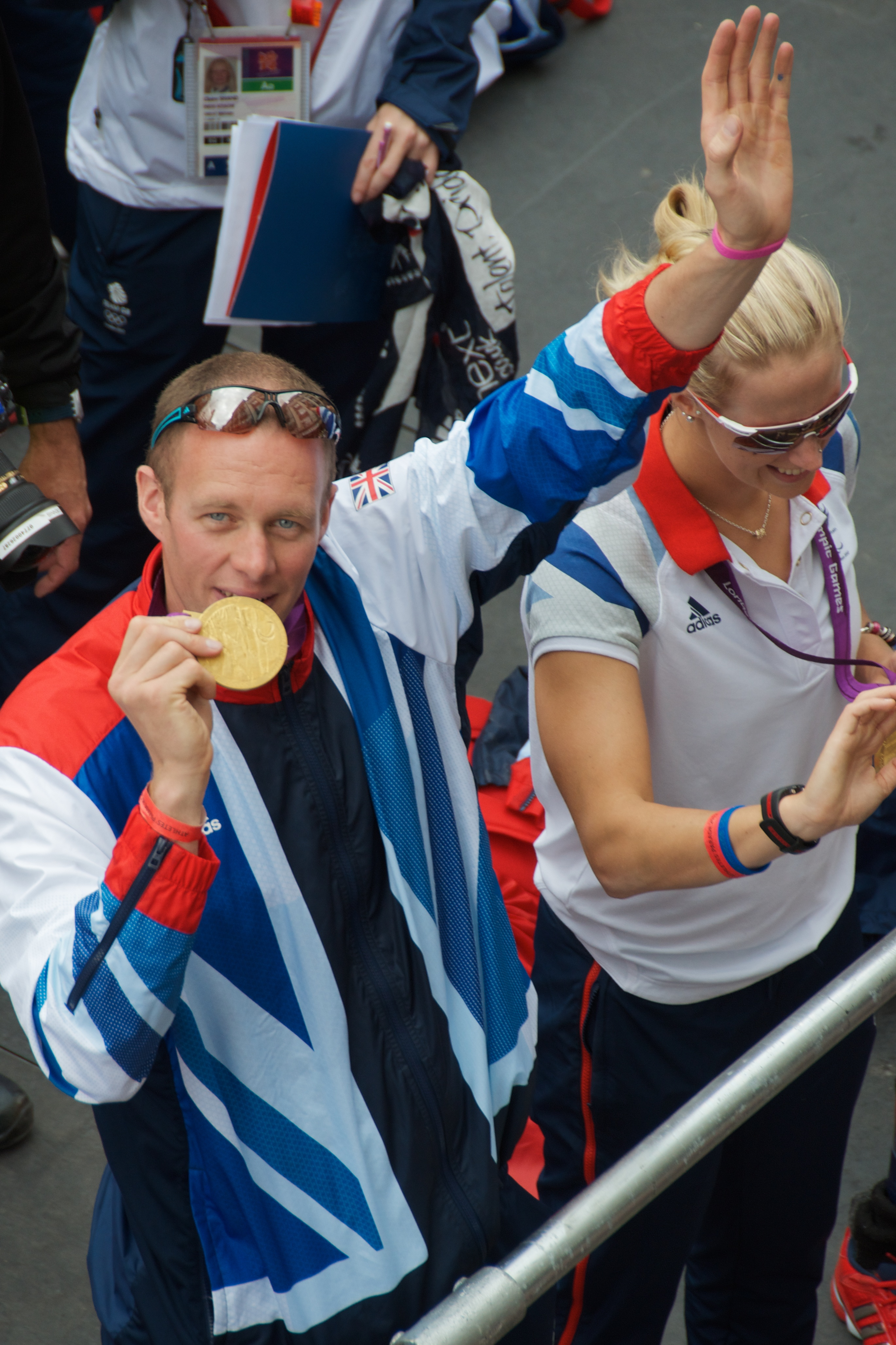
Riches along with her British compatriot, David Smith

Riches won a further world title in 2009, alongside Hansford, David Smith, James Roe and cox Rhiannon Jones. At the 2010 World Championships she won a silver medal competing with Smith, Roe, Ryan Chamberlain and Jones. He is visually impaired.

In 2011, she competed at the World Rowing Championships held at Lake Bled, Bled, Slovenia. She won the gold medal in the LTAMix4+ event alongside crewmates Pam Relph, David Smith, James Roe and Lily van den Broecke, the cox. They completed the one kilometre course in a time of three minutes, 27.10 seconds, finishing nearly five seconds ahead of the second placed Canadian boat. The result qualified a boat for Great Britain into the 2012 Summer Paralympics in London. The crew repeated their gold medal result at the Munich World Cup event in 2012.

Riches was selected along with Relph, Smith, Roe and van den Broeke, to represent Great Britain at the 2012 Summer Paralympics in the mixed coxed four event. The event took place between 31 August and 2 September at Eton Dorney, and the GB crew won the gold medal.

She was inducted into the London Youth Games Hall of Fame in 2012.

Riches was appointed Member of the Order of the British Empire (MBE) in the 2013 New Year Honours for services to rowing.

In 2016, she became the first woman to row the length of the River Thames. She completed this in less than 48 hours, as she had hoped (six seconds less exactly).

== See also ==
- 2012 Olympics gold post boxes in the United Kingdom
