= David Smith (rower) =

British Paralympic rower

David Smith MBE
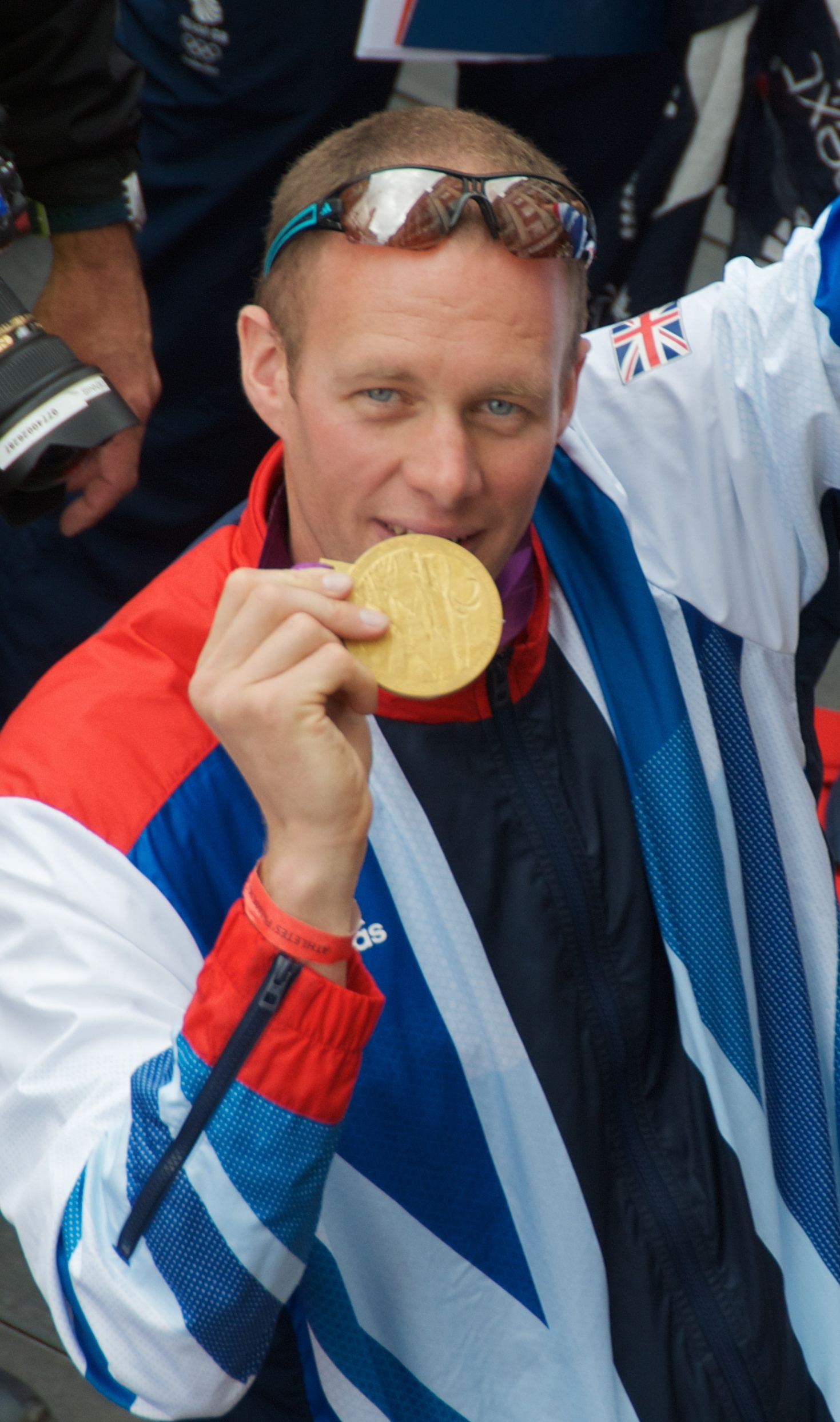
- 2012

Personal information
- Nationality: British
- Born: 21 April 1978 (age 48) Dunfermline, Fife, Scotland

Sport
- Country: United Kingdom
- Sport: Adaptive rowing
Medal record
Para rowing
Representing Great Britain
Paralympic Games
Gold medal – first place	2012 London	LTA coxed four
World Championships
Gold medal – first place	2009 Poznań	LTA coxed four
Gold medal – first place	2011 Bled	LTA coxed four

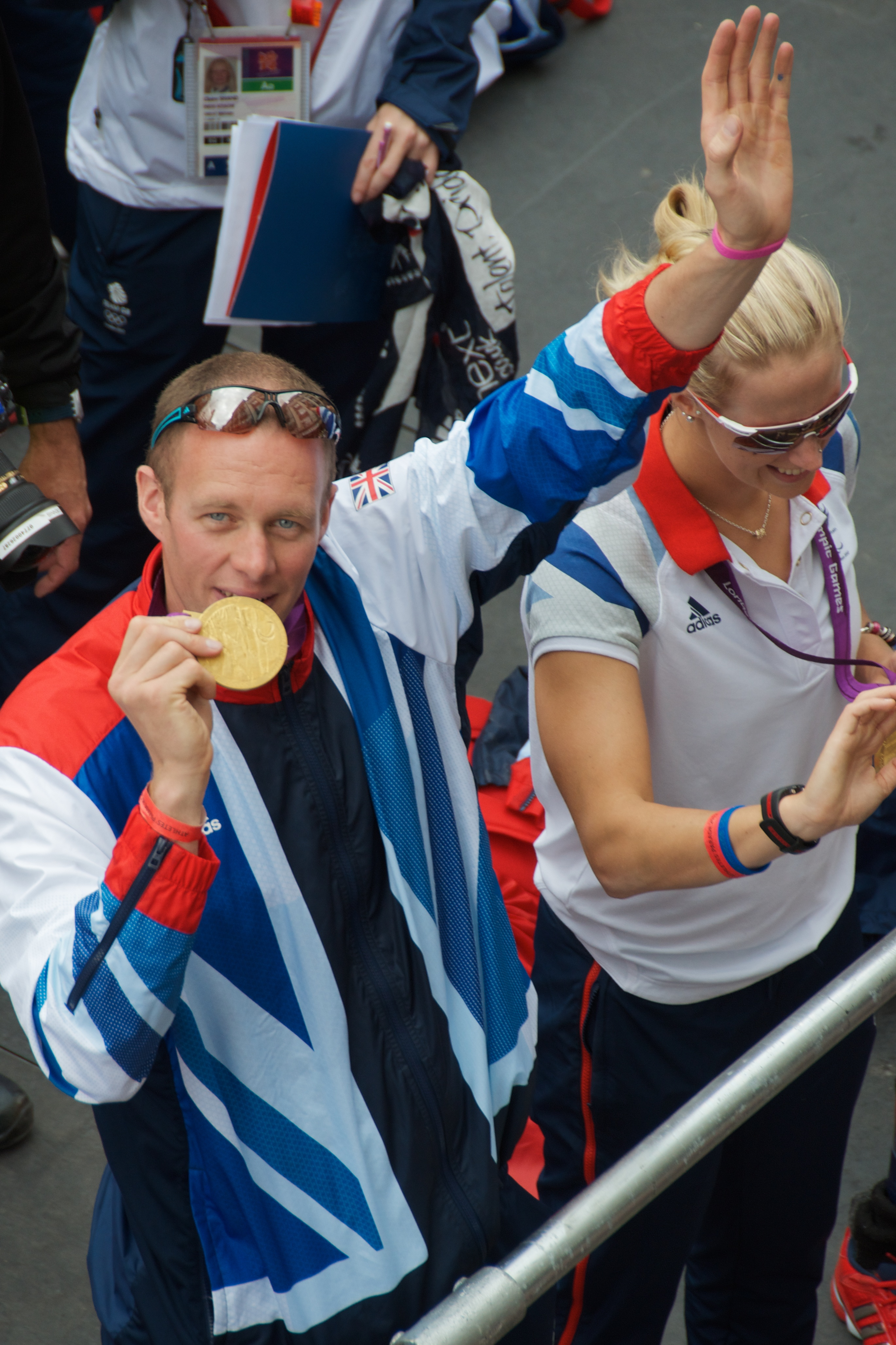
David Smith with Naomi Riches

David Smith MBE (born 21 April 1978) is a British adaptive rower who won a gold medal at the 2012 Summer Paralympics.

== Personal life ==
Smith was born on 21 April 1978 in Dunfermline, Fife, Scotland. He was born with a club foot and for the first three years of his life he had his bones repeatedly broken and reset to correct his foot's alignment.

He graduated from the University of Bath in 2009 with a bachelor's degree in sports performance.

In 2010 he underwent emergency surgery after doctors found a tumour inside his spinal cord at cervical spine level. The surgery left him temporarily paralysed, an issue that was later determined to be the result of a blood clot.

He is a vegan.

In February 2026, Smith revealed that he was moved to palliative care and told that he only has 4 months left to live due to his spinal tumour spreading to his brain.

== Early sporting career ==
He earned a Black Belt in Karate and was in the British squad for 6 years. He took up sprinting in a desire to compete at the Olympics as karate was not an Olympic sport, and became East of Scotland 400m champion in mainstream athletics, and took third in the 200m behind Olympian Ian Mackie. But running round bends caused stress fractures which forced him to quit.

He turned to bobsleigh, because straight-line running was fine and made the GB team as a brakeman. But neck and back pains interrupted training and he missed a 2006 Winter Olympics spot by one-hundredth of a second.

== Rowing ==
Smith was introduced to adaptive rowing in 2009 at a Paralympic Potential Day run by the British Paralympic Association. He competes in the legs, trunks and arms adaptive mixed coxed four (LTAMix4+) event in which he won a gold medal at the 2009 World Rowing Championships, competing in a crew with Vicky Hansford, Naomi Riches, James Roe and cox Rhiannon Jones.

In 2011 he competed at the World Rowing Championships held at Lake Bled, Bled, Slovenia. He won the gold medal in the LTAMix4+ event alongside crewmates Pam Relph, Naomi Riches, James Roe and cox, Lily van den Broecke. They completed the one kilometre course in a time of three minutes, 27.10 seconds, finishing nearly five seconds ahead of runners-up Canada. The result qualified a boat for Great Britain into the 2012 Summer Paralympics in London. The crew repeated their gold medal result at the Munich World Cup event in 2012.

Smith was selected along with Relph, Riches, Roe, and van den Broeke, to compete for Great Britain at the 2012 Summer Paralympics in the mixed coxed four event. The event took place between 31 August and 2 September at Eton Dorney. The Great Britain crew won gold.

Smith was appointed Member of the Order of the British Empire (MBE) in the 2013 New Year Honours for services to rowing.

== Cycling ==
Despite his success at rowing, medical issues forced Smith to retire from that sport, and he subsequently joined British Cycling's Paralympic Academy programme in 2014. He continued to compete at Paracycling despite further surgery on the tumour, taking ninth place at the final Para-cycling Road World Cup of the 2015 season in Pietermaritzburg, but in January 2016 he announced that he'd need another operation that ended his plans to compete at the 2016 Paralympic games.

== See also ==
- 2012 Olympics gold post boxes in the United Kingdom
