= Pam Relph =

British Paralympic rower

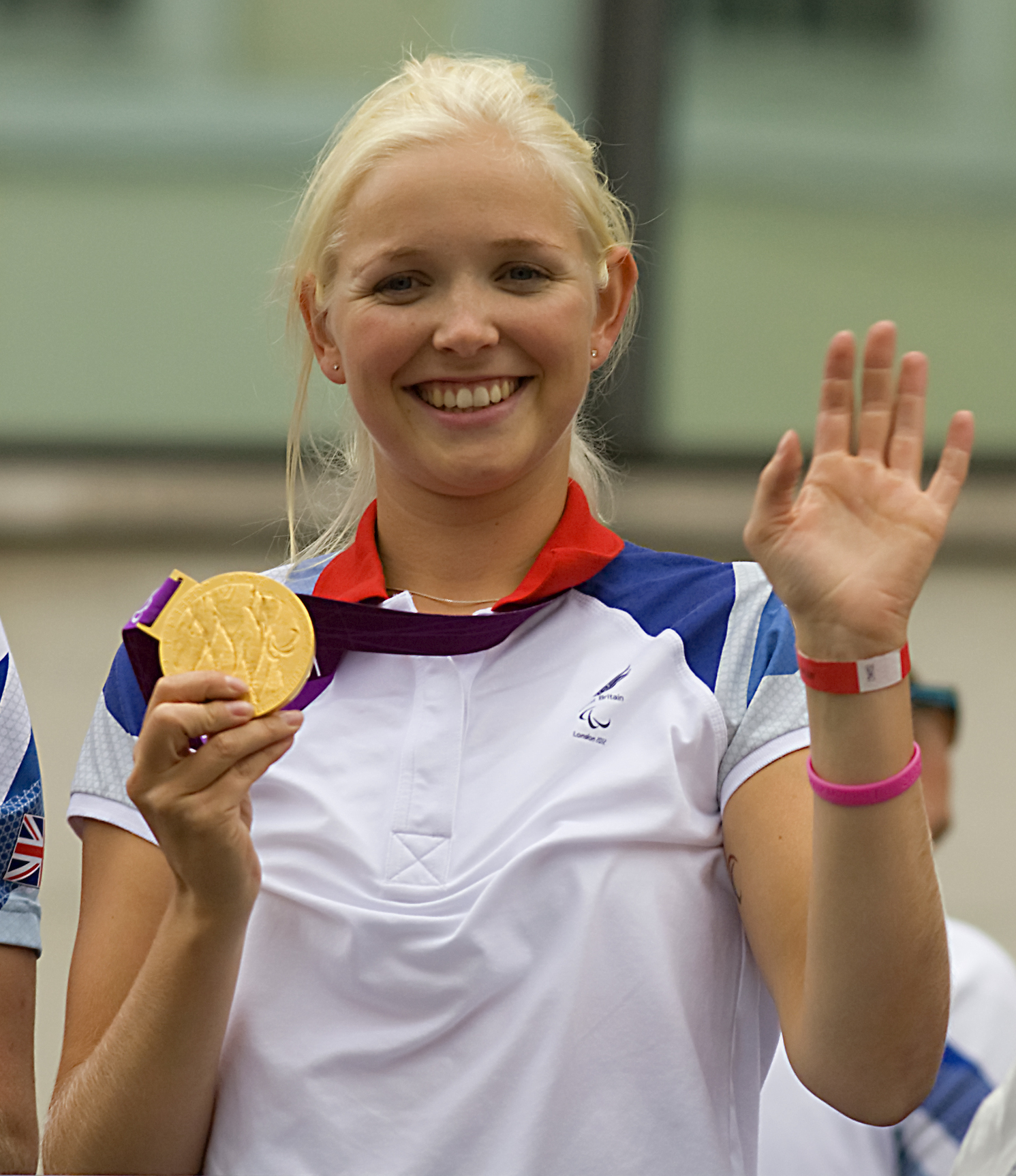
- Pam Relph with 2012 Summer Paralympics gold medal

Medal record

Representing Great Britain

Paralympic rowing

Summer Paralympic Games
Gold medal – first place	2012 London	LTA coxed fours
Gold medal – first place	2016 Rio de Janeiro	LTA coxed fours

World Rowing Championships
Gold medal – first place	2011 Bled	LTA coxed fours
Gold medal – first place	2013 Chungju	LTA coxed fours
Gold medal – first place	2014 Amsterdam	LTA coxed fours
Gold medal – first place	2015 Aiguebelette	LTA coxed fours

Pamela Lillian Relph MBE (born 14 November 1989) is a British adaptive rower who won gold medals at the 2012 and 2016 Summer Paralympics, thus becoming the first double gold medallist in Paralympic rowing.

== Personal life ==
Relph was born on 14 November 1989 in Aylesbury, Buckinghamshire, England. She attended John Colet School, in Wendover, Buckinghamshire, who have named one of their tutor houses after her.

She attended the Welbeck Defence Sixth Form College on an Army scholarship and planned to join the Royal Engineers as an Engineering Officer. Her army career was ended by arthritis. She studied at the University of Birmingham and graduated in 2011 with a Bachelor of Science degree in physics.

She is the sister of Monica Relph, GB Women's Senior rowing Squad member.

== Rowing ==
Relph was introduced to the sport of rowing in August 2010 by her older sister, who had rowed internationally for Great Britain. In November 2010 she finished second in the British Indoor Rowing Championships.

In 2011, she competed at the World Rowing Championships held at Lake Bled, Bled, Slovenia. She won the gold medal in the Legs Trunk and Arms mixed Coxed Four (LTAMix4+) event alongside crewmates Naomi Riches, David Smith, James Roe and Lily van den Broecke, the cox. They completed the one kilometre course in a time of three minutes, 27.10 seconds, finishing nearly five seconds ahead of the second placed Canadian boat. The result meant that Great Britain qualified a boat for the 2012 Summer Paralympics in London. The crew repeated their gold medal result at the Munich World Cup event in 2012.

She was selected along with Riches, Smith, Roe and van den Broeke, to represent Great Britain at the 2012 Summer Paralympics in the mixed coxed four event. The event took place from 31 August to 2 September at Eton Dorney, where team GB won the gold medal.

The GB LTAM4+ crew retained their World Champions crown in August 2013 at Chungju, South Korea. Relph, along with Riches and new crew members Oliver Hester, James Fox and cox Oliver James, took gold in a time of 3min 16.12sec, ahead of Italy (silver) and South Africa (bronze).

In 2014 Relph and crewmates Hester, Fox, James and Grace Clough successfully defended their LTAMxd4+ World Champion status in Amsterdam with the same crew going on to repeat this feat at the 2015 World Championships at Aiguebelette, France, defeating the American crew by.26 of a second in the Final.

Victory at Aiguebelette qualified the GB LTAM4+ boat for the Rio de Janeiro Paralympic regatta, where Relph and her crew won Gold, retaining their Paralympic title, in a time of 3 min 17.17 seconds, defeating USA (silver) and Canada (bronze) and making Relph the first Paralympic rower to win two gold medals.

Relph was appointed Member of the Order of the British Empire (MBE) in the 2013 New Year Honours for services to rowing.

== See also ==
- 2012 Olympics gold post boxes in the United Kingdom
