= Josef Craig =

British Paralympic swimmer

Josef Craig MBE
Personal information
- Full name: Josef Isaac Craig
- Born: 17 February 1997 (age 29) Hebburn, England

Sport
- Sport: Swimming
- Club: City of Sunderland ASC
- Coach: Danny Thompson
Medal record
Men's swimming
Representing Great Britain
Paralympic Games
Gold medal – first place	2012 London	400 m freestyle S7
Bronze medal – third place	2016 Rio	100 m freestyle S8
World Championships
Gold medal – first place	2013 Montreal	100 m freestyle S7
Gold medal – first place	2013 Montreal	400 m freestyle S7
Silver medal – second place	2013 Montreal	50 m freestyle S7
European Championships
Silver medal – second place	2016 Funchal	400m freestyle S8
Silver medal – second place	2016 Funchal	4x100m freestyle relay 34pts
Bronze medal – third place	2014 Eindhoven	400M freestyle S8
Bronze medal – third place	2014 Eindhoven	4x100m freestyle relay 34pts

Josef Isaac Craig, MBE (born 17 February 1997) is a retired British Paralympic swimmer. Craig competed in S8 events and qualified for the 2012 Summer Paralympics, winning gold in a world record time in the men's 400 m freestyle event.

== Personal life ==
Craig was born in Hebburn, Tyne and Wear on 17 February 1997. Craig, who has cerebral palsy, was introduced to disability swimming at the age of nine, before entering competitive swimming a few years later. Noted as a swimming talent from a young age, and ear-marked for the Great Britain team at the 2016 Summer Paralympics in Rio de Janeiro, Craig's career suffered a setback when he was diagnosed with Graves' disease in 2011. The condition, which affects the thyroid gland, caused severe weight loss in Craig, but after having his thyroid removed he quickly returned to swimming. He is a supporter of Newcastle United FC.

== Career history ==
Craig trained at the City of Sunderland Amateur Swimming Club. In 2012 he set five personal bests at the Paralympic trials for the 2012 Games in London and then won his first British medal with a bronze in the 100 m freestyle at the 2012 British Swimming Championships. Later that year, at the British International Disability Championships, he improved again on his personal best to take the youth 100 m freestyle title. In the same tournament, Craig won gold in the men's youth 50 m, with a time of 29.95s, and bronze in the men's open 400 m challenge.

Craig's performances in 2012 saw him selected for the 2012 Summer Paralympics in London. He was selected for four events, the 50 m freestyle, 100 m freestyle and his favoured 400 m freestyle, all in the S7 class. Craig qualified for the final of the 50 m freestyle with a time of 29.48 seconds and then shaved almost a tenth of a second from this to finish 7th. He also qualified out of the heats in the 100 m event, finishing fourth with a time of 1:04.00. In the final he ended just outside the podium position with a fourth place and a time of 1:02.20. On 6 September in his final event, the 400 m freestyle, Craig set a new world record of 4:45.79 to take the fastest qualifying position in his morning heat. In the finals that afternoon he recorded a time of 4:42.81 to beat his own world record set earlier that day, and saw him finish first to collect the gold; his first Paralympic medal, making him Great Britain's youngest 2012 gold medal winner. To commemorate his gold medal Royal Mail painted a post box gold in his hometown of Jarrow, Tyne and Wear, and produced a first class stamp featuring a picture of him. As a result of his success he was jointly awarded the North East Sports Personality of the Year award, along with Olympian rower Kat Copeland in December 2012. Then, on 16 December, Craig was named BBC Young Sports Personality of the Year for 2012 at the BBC's main annual award.

Craig was appointed Member of the Order of the British Empire (MBE) in the 2013 New Year Honours for services to swimming.

Initially classified as a S7 swimmer, Craig was reclassified in April 2014 as S8. His previous achievements continued to stand, but it meant that Craig would now compete in future events with swimmers deemed to have more mobility. His first major tournament after being reclassified was the 2014 IPC Swimming European Championships, where he claimed three bronze medals, an achievement that Craig was pleased with.

At the 2016 Rio Paralympics, Craig won the bronze medal in the men's 100m freestyle S8.

== See also ==
- 2012 Olympics gold post boxes in the United Kingdom
