= Lily van den Broecke =

British Paralympic rower

Lily van den Broecke MBE
Personal information
- Full name: Lily Jacoba van den Broecke
- Nationality: United Kingdom
- Born: 8 January 1992 (age 34) London, England
- Height: 1.64 m (5 ft 5 in)
- Weight: 50 kg (110 lb)

Sport
- Country: Great Britain
- Sport: Rowing
- College team: Durham University Boat Club
Medal record
Rowing
Representing Great Britain
Paralympic Games
Gold medal – first place	2012 London	LTAMix4+
World Championships
Gold medal – first place	2011 Bled	LTAMix4+

Lily Jacoba van den Broecke MBE (born 8 January 1992) is a British rower who competed at the 2012 Summer Paralympics as the coxswain in the mixed coxed four for Great Britain, and won the gold medal.

== Personal life ==
Lily van den Broecke was born on 8 January 1992 in Lambeth, England. She is 1.64 metres (5 ft 5 in) tall and weighed 50 kilograms (110 lb) when she competed. She went to primary school at St Thomas' CE in Winchelsea East Sussex and moved to Oxford for secondary school. She was a student at Durham University, belonging to University College, Durham more commonly known as Castle. Lily studied for a Bachelor of Arts degree in Politics, Philosophy and Economics. She now works at the British Film Institute in London and has a keen interest in film, art, and aesthetics. Lily maintains a fondness for classical music and spends much, if not most, of her spare time composing hymns for the recorder.

== Rowing ==
She began rowing when she attended Headington School, Oxford. After competing in sculling for four years she tried out as a cox. In 2009, she coxed the junior women's eight crew to fourth place at the Australian Youth Olympic Festival and a gold medal at the Coupe de la Jeunesse in Vichy, France. In 2010, she won a gold medal coxing the junior women's eight at the World Rowing Junior Championships in Račice, Czech Republic. This was the first ever junior women's gold medal for the Great Britain Rowing Team.

In 2011, she competed at the World Rowing Championships held at Lake Bled, Bled, Slovenia. She won a gold medal in the LTAMix4+ event coxing a crew of Pam Relph, Naomi Riches, James Roe and David Smith. They completed the one kilometre course in a time of three minutes, 27.10 seconds, finishing nearly five seconds ahead of runners-up Canada. The result qualified a boat for Great Britain into the 2012 Summer Paralympics in London. The crew repeated their gold medal result at the Munich World Cup event in 2012.

She was selected to cox the crew of Pam Relph, Naomi Riches, James Roe and David Smith in the mixed coxed four event for Great Britain at the 2012 Summer Paralympics. The event took place between 31 August and 2 September at Eton Dorney in Buckinghamshire, and the GB crew won the gold medal.

She was appointed Member of the Order of the British Empire (MBE) in the 2013 New Year Honours for services to rowing and Paralympic sport.

== See also ==
- 2012 Summer Olympics and Paralympics gold post boxes
