= Swimming at the 2012 Summer Paralympics – Men's 400 metre freestyle S7 =

Men's 400 metre freestyle S7 at the XIV Paralympic Games
- Venue: London Aquatics Centre
- Dates: 6 September 2012
- Competitors: 16 from 13 nations

Medalists
1st place, gold medalist(s)		Josef Craig	Great Britain
2nd place, silver medalist(s)		Shiyun Pan	China
3rd place, bronze medalist(s)		Andrey Gladkov	Russia

The men's 400 metre freestyle S7 event at the 2012 Paralympic Games took place on 6 September, at the London Aquatics Centre in the Olympic Park, London. The event was for athletes included in the S7 classification, which is for competitors with physical impairments. Sixteen swimmers took part, representing a total of thirteen different nations. Great Britain's Josef Craig set a new world records in both the heats and the final as he won the gold medal.

== Competition ==
=== Heats ===
Two heats were held, each with eight swimmers; the swimmers with the eight fastest times advanced to the final. The heats took place on 6 September starting at 9:51 BST.

British swimmer Josef Craig won the first heat while setting a new world record time of four minutes, 45.79 seconds. Shiyun Pan of China finished third in the heat but set a new Asian record time Croatian Mihovil Spanja and Australian Matthew Levy also qualified for the final from heat one.

The second heat was won by Jonathan Fox of Great Britain in a time of four minutes, 49.91 seconds. Fox qualified from the heats as the second fastest swimmer overall and was joined in the final by Andrey Gladkov of Russia, Marian Kvasnytsia of Ukraine and Lantz Lamback of the United States, who finished second, third and fourth in the second heat.

=== Final ===
The final of the event took place on 6 September at 17:47 BST. Great Britain's Craig won the gold medal in a time of four minutes, 42.81 seconds, breaking his own world record that he had set in heats earlier in the day. At the age of 15 Craig was the youngest gold medallist for the hosts Great Britain at the 2012 Games. The silver medal went to Pan of China as he beat his own Asian record time from the heats. Bronze was won by 15-year-old Russian Gladkov.

== Results ==
Key

- Q Qualified for next round
- AS = Asian record
- WR = World record

=== Heats ===
==== Heat 1 ====
Rank	Lane	Name	Nationality	Time	Notes
1	5	Josef Craig	Great Britain	4:45.79	Q, WR
2	4	Mihovil Spanja	Croatia	4:52.99	Q
3	3	Shiyun Pan	China	4:53.37	Q, AS
4	6	Matthew Levy	Australia	4:57.68	Q
5	2	Oleksandr Komarov	Ukraine	5:14.14	
6	1	Ronaldo Santos	Brazil	5:19.85	
7	7	Tobias Pollap	Germany	5:20.08	
8	8	Jumpei Kimura	Japan	5:45.79	

==== Heat 2 ====
Rank	Lane	Name	Nationality	Time	Notes
1	4	Jonathan Fox	Great Britain	4:49.91	Q
2	5	Andrey Gladkov	Russia	4:50.06	Q
3	3	Lantz Lamback	United States	4:59.47	Q
4	2	Marian Kvasnytsia	Ukraine	5:05.50	Q
5	1	Italo Pereira	Brazil	5:08.70	
6	7	Francesco Bocciardo	Italy	5:14.78	
7	6	Jay Dohnt	Australia	5:22.30	
8	8	Enrique Perez Davila	Mexico	5:25.32	

=== Final ===
Rank	Lane	Name	Nationality	Time	Notes
1st place, gold medalist(s)	4	Josef Craig	Great Britain	4:42.81	WR
2nd place, silver medalist(s)	5	Shiyun Pan	China	4:46.22	AS
3rd place, bronze medalist(s)	3	Andrey Gladkov	Russia	4:46.76	
4	7	Jonathan Fox	Great Britain	4:48.03	
5	6	Mihovil Spanja	Croatia	4:52.22	
6	2	Lantz Lamback	United States	4:56.87	
7	8	Matthew Levy	Australia	4:58.12	
8	1	Marian Kvasnytsia	Ukraine	5:04.92	
