= Helen Arbuthnot =

British rower

Helen Arbuthnot (born 17 November 1984) is an Irish professional rowing coxswain and a member of the Ireland Rowing Team. Coxswain for the Paralympic Class LTA (PR3) 4+. Ranked the number 5 in the world between 2010– 2012 [coxed the mixed coxed four team for Ireland in the 2012 Summer Paralympics and is a fully abled person. Arbuthnot became involved with rowing in 2004 and subsequently became cox of the Irish mixed coxed four boat.

The crew finished in fifth place at the 2011 World Rowing Championships in Slovenia, meaning that they became the first Irish boat to compete at a Paralympic Games in 2012.

She was born on 17 November 1984 in Christchurch, Dorset, to Thomas Arbuthnot.
