= Anke Molkenthin =

German adaptive rower and paracanoeist (born 1962)

Personal information
- Born: 26 May 1962 (age 64) Berlin, Germany
- Height: 168 cm (5 ft 6 in)

Sport
- Country: Germany
- Sport: Adaptive rowing
- Disability: Dystonia
Medal record
Adaptive rowing
Representing Germany
Paralympic Games
Silver medal – second place	2012 London	Mixed coxed four
World Championships
Silver medal – second place	2013 Chungju	LTAMix2x
Bronze medal – third place	2009 Poznan	LTAMix4+
Bronze medal – third place	2010 Cambridge	LTAMix4+
Bronze medal – third place	2011 Bled	LTAMix4+

Anke Molkenthin (born 26 May 1962) is a German adaptive rower and paracanoeist who competes in international level events.

She has competed as a rower in the mixed coxed four in the 2012 Summer Paralympics where she won a silver medal and competed in the 2016 Summer Paralympics as a rower and a paracanoeist but did not medal in both sports.
