= Katrin Splitt =

German rower

Personal information
- Born: 11 August 1977 (age 48) Berlin, Germany
- Height: 1.70 m (5 ft 7 in)
- Weight: 50 kg (110 lb)

Sport
- Country: Germany
- Sport: Adaptive rowing
Medal record
Adaptive rowing
Representing Germany
Paralympic Games
Silver medal – second place	2012 London	Mixed coxed four
World Championships
Bronze medal – third place	2010 Karapiro	Mixed coxed four
Bronze medal – third place	2011 Bled	Mixed coxed four

Katrin Splitt (born 11 August 1977) is a German former adaptive rower who competed at international elite competitions. She is a Paralympic silver medalist and a two-time World bronze medalist in the mixed coxed four.
