= Astrid Hengsbach =

German rower

Personal information
- Born: 23 March 1979 (age 47) Herdecke, Germany

Sport
- Country: Germany
- Sport: Para rowing
- Club: Ruderclub Westfalen Herdecke
Medal record
Para rowing
Representing Germany
Paralympic Games
Silver medal – second place	2012 London	Mixed coxed four

Astrid Hengsbach (born 23 March 1979) is a German former Paralympic rower who competed at international rowing competitions. She is a Paralympic silver medalist at the 2012 Summer Paralympics.

In 2010, Hengsbach was involved in a car accident and suffered from a stiffened ankle joint and limited motion in her right hand.
