= Olena Pukhaieva =

Ukrainian rower

Personal information
- Nationality: Ukrainian
- Born: 4 February 1961 (age 64)

Sport
- Sport: Rowing

Olena Pukhaieva (born 4 February 1961) is a Ukrainian rower. She competed in the women's eight event at the 1988 Summer Olympics.
