= Dorney Lake =

Artificial lake in Buckinghamshire, England

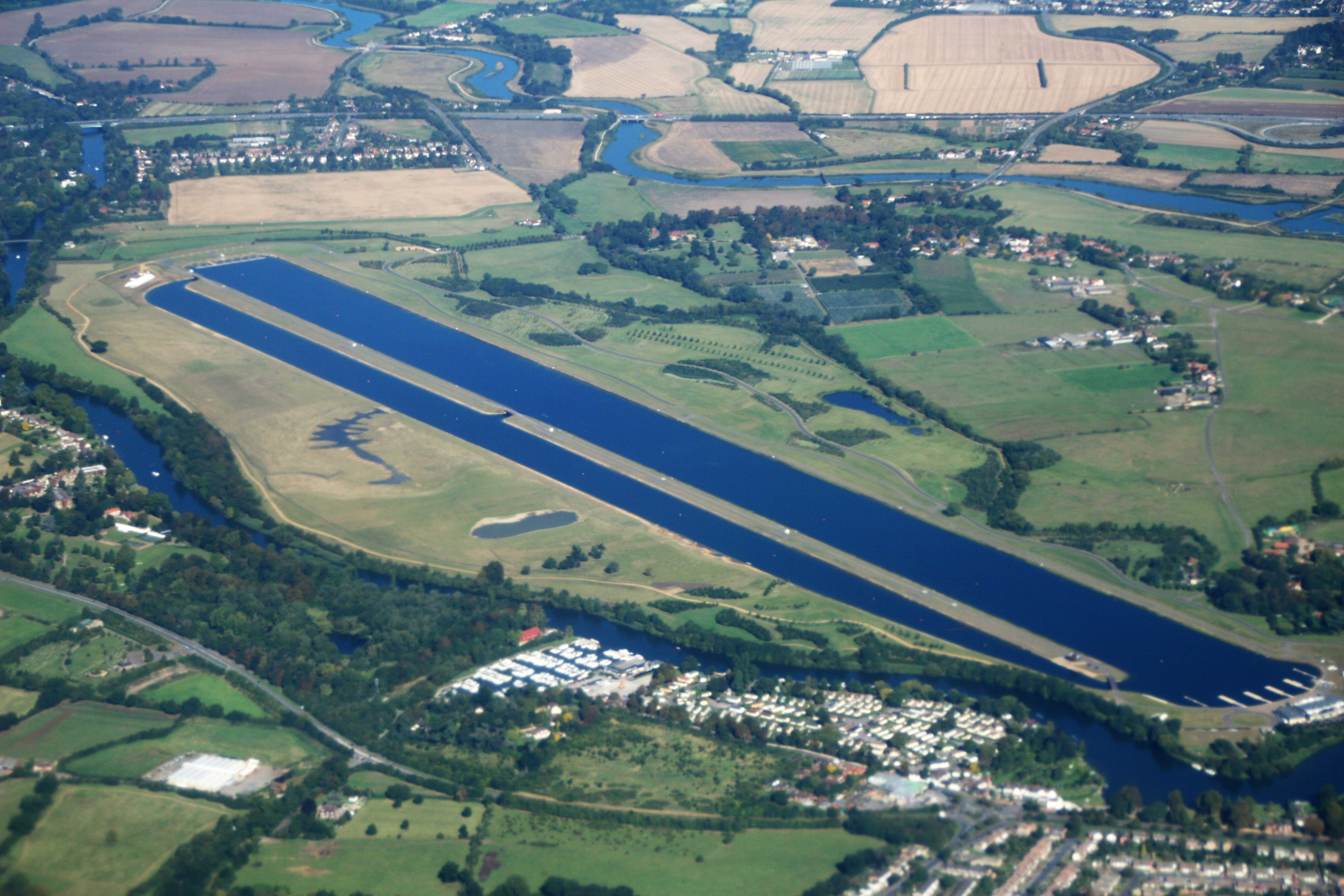
- Aerial view of Dorney Lake in 2007

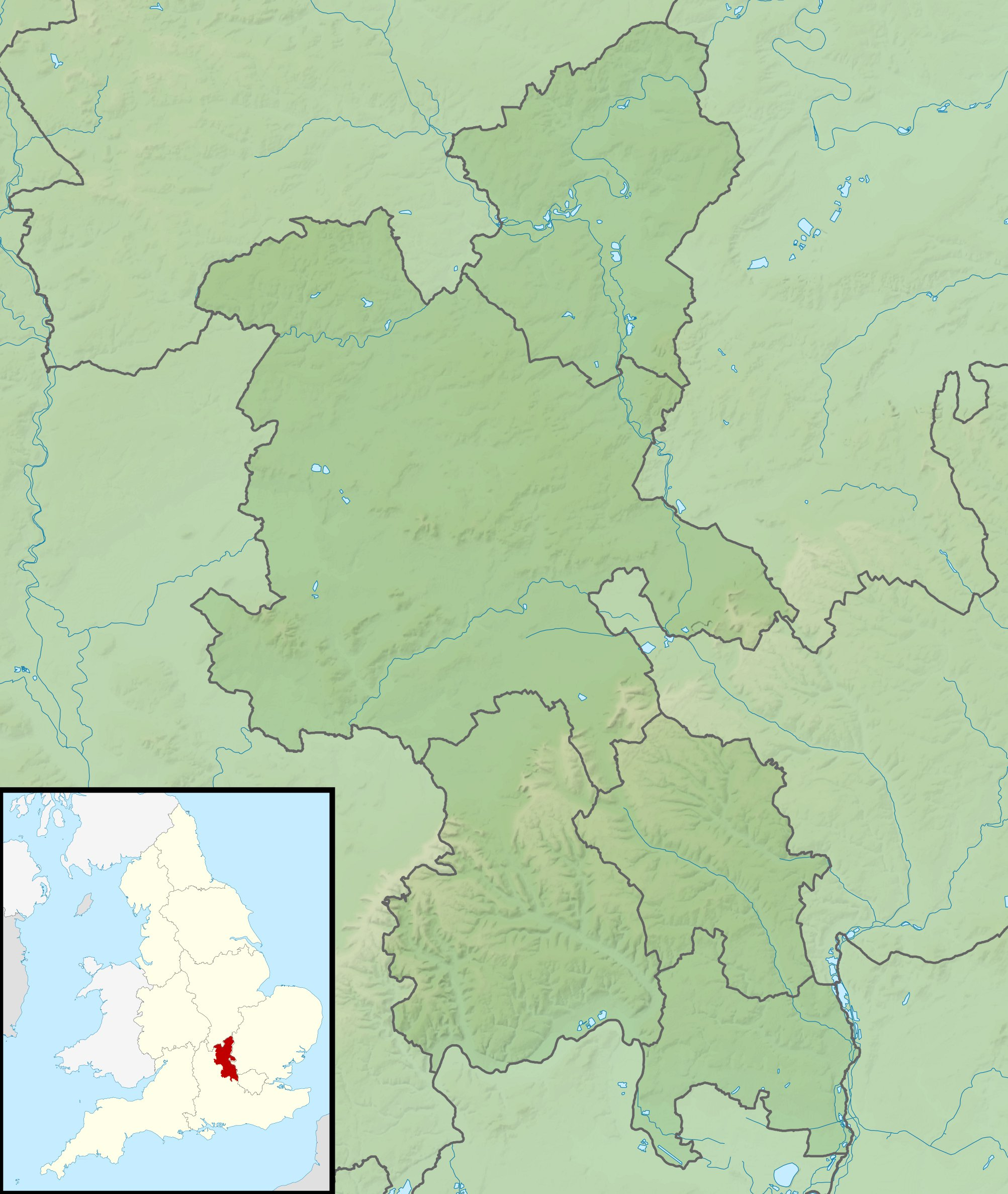
- Location within Buckinghamshire
- Location: Dorney, Buckinghamshire, England
- Coordinates: 51.4933°N 0.6655°W
- Type: Artificial lake, rowing lake
- Basin countries: United Kingdom
- Built: 2006
- Max. length: 2.2 kilometres (1.4 miles)

Dorney Lake (also known as Eton College Rowing Centre, and as Eton Dorney as a 2012 Summer Olympics venue) is a purpose-built rowing lake and Meetings & Events Venue in England. It is near the village of Dorney, Buckinghamshire, and is around 3 km (2 miles) west of Windsor and Eton, close to the River Thames.

The lake is privately owned and financed by Eton College, which spent £17 million developing it. Additional grants, totalling £500,000, were obtained from Sport England, UK Sport, the DCMS and SEEDA in order to build the lake's finish tower. The project was completed in 2006, after 10 years of construction. The facilities are hired out for rowing, as well as for canoeing, Hospitality, dragon boating, and triathlon.

== 2012 Olympic venue ==
The lake was used as the 2012 Summer Olympic venue for rowing and canoe sprint, and as the 2012 Summer Paralympic venue for rowing. For the duration of the Olympics, the lake was officially referred to as Eton Dorney; confusingly, a separate venue in Stratford was called Eton Manor due to 19th-century associations with the school.

To provide for Olympic spectators, the existing facilities were enhanced to include 20,000 additional seats; most of these seats were temporary. Construction of enhancements to Dorney Lake began in October 2009, following investigations by Oxford Archaeology, including a new cut-through between the competition lake and the return lane, a new bridge and an upgraded access road, funded by the Olympic Delivery Authority (ODA). During the Olympic events, Dorney Lake was staffed by around 3,500 personnel including volunteers; it could accommodate up to 30,000 spectators per day. A temporary bridge over the River Thames linked the Dorney Lake site to Windsor Racecourse, where a pick-up and drop-off point for Olympic spectators was established. Other access options existed for walkers and cyclists.

== Past events ==
Dorney Lake has hosted the following international rowing events:

- 2005 Rowing World Cup (26–28 May)
- 2005 Coupe de la Jeunesse (29–31 July)
- 2006 World Rowing Championships (20–27 August)
- 2011 World Rowing Junior Championships (3–7 August)
- 2012 Summer Olympics (27 July – 12 August: rowing from 28 July to 4 August, then canoe sprint)
- 2012 Summer Paralympics (29 August – 9 September: rowing from 31 August to 2 September)
- 2013 Rowing World Cup (21–23 June)

The lake also hosted the annual National Schools' Regatta from 2016-2024. It hosted the regatta again in 2026.

== Lake specifications ==
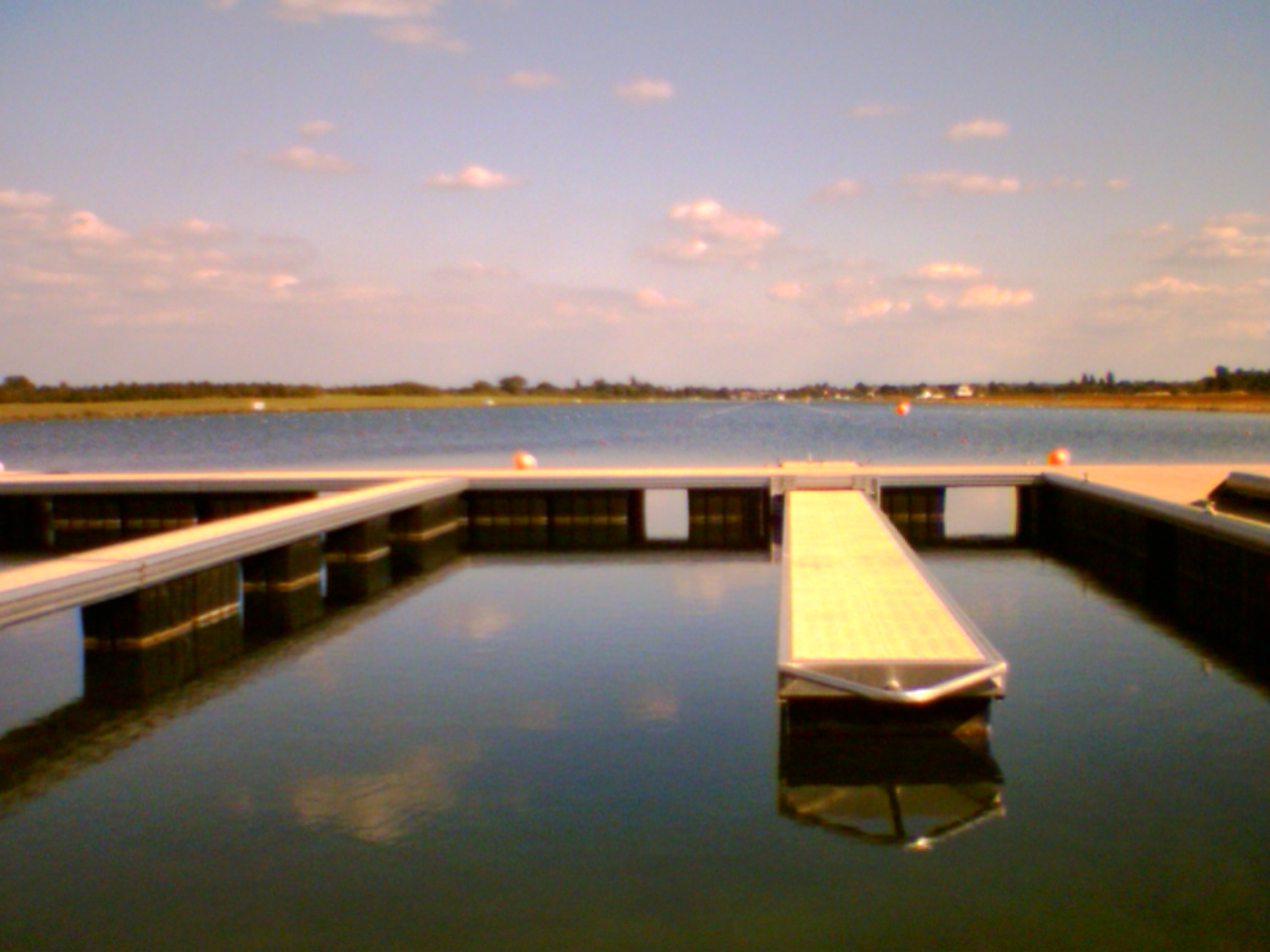
The rowers' starting line at Dorney Lake

The lake's dimensions follow the FISA rules for a rowing lake suitable for hosting a World Rowing Championship, World Rowing Cup or Olympic regatta:

- Stillwater, with consistent water conditions
- 2,200 metres (7,200 ft) straight length for racing
- 8 rowing lanes, each 13.5 metres (44 ft) wide
- Minimum water depth of 3.5 metres (11 ft)
- A return channel allowing boats to move to the start, separated from the main lake by an island

== Home regattas ==
Since the lake was opened, a number of annual regattas that were previously held on the River Thames have been transferred to the lake. These include the Marlow Regatta in June, the Metropolitan Regatta in May/June, and the Wallingford Regatta in May.

== Public access ==
The public are allowed to use the grounds of Dorney Lake when sporting events are not being run. The two-kilometre-long flat, straight paths that run along each side of the main lake make it a popular venue for runners, skaters, and even cross-country skiers practising with roller skis. The picturesque landscape also makes it a popular location for dog walkers and people out for fun.

== Gallery ==
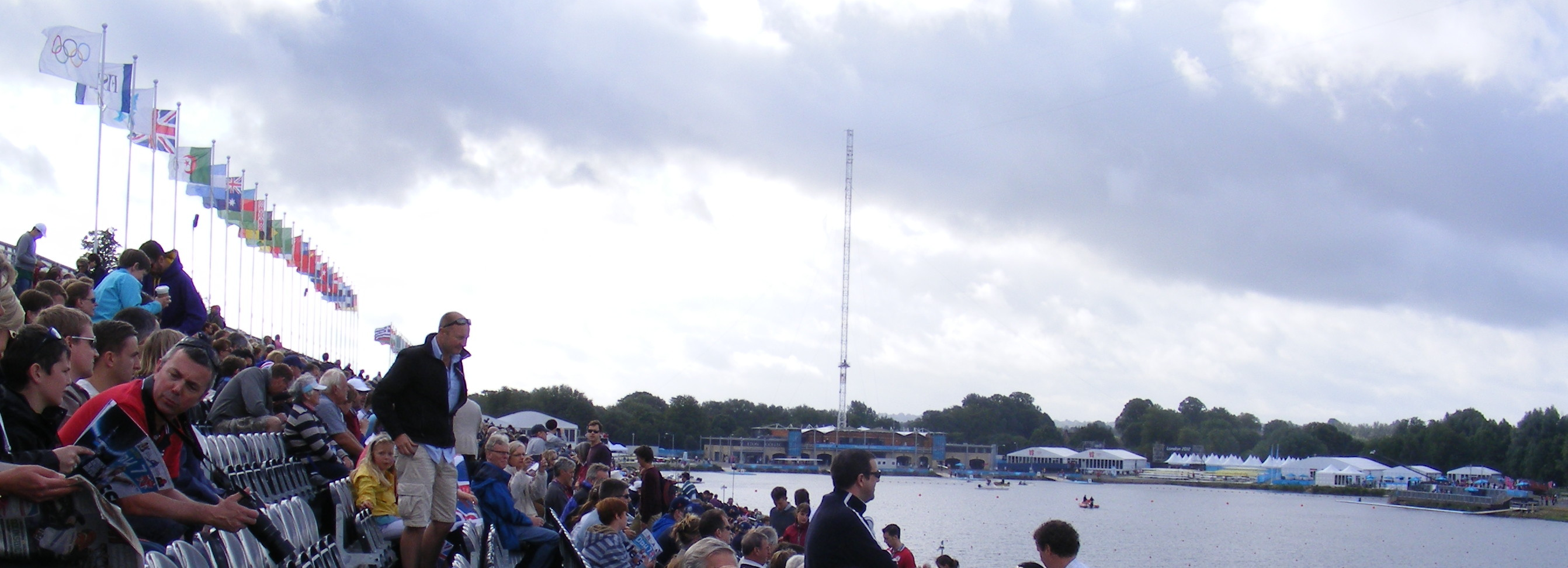
The lake during the 2012 Summer Olympics

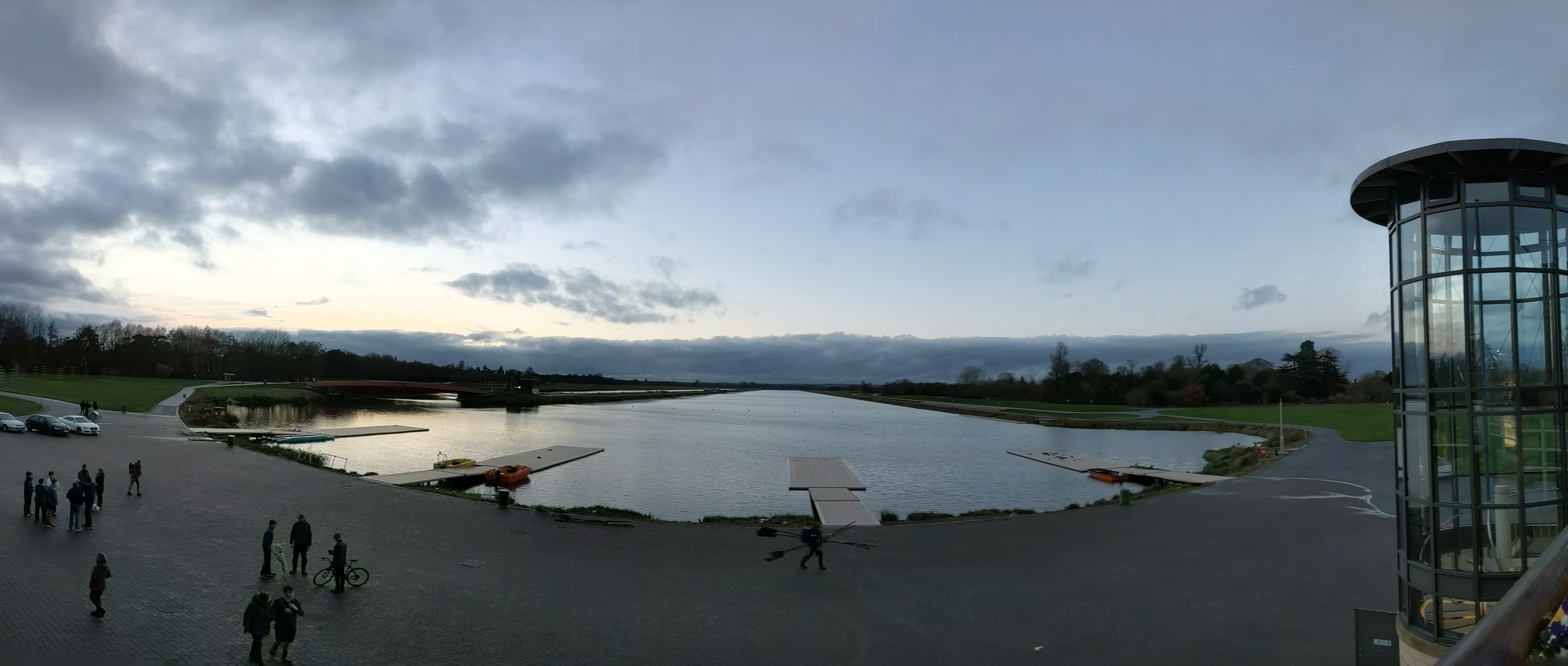
Panorama of the lake looking down the lake from the training centre

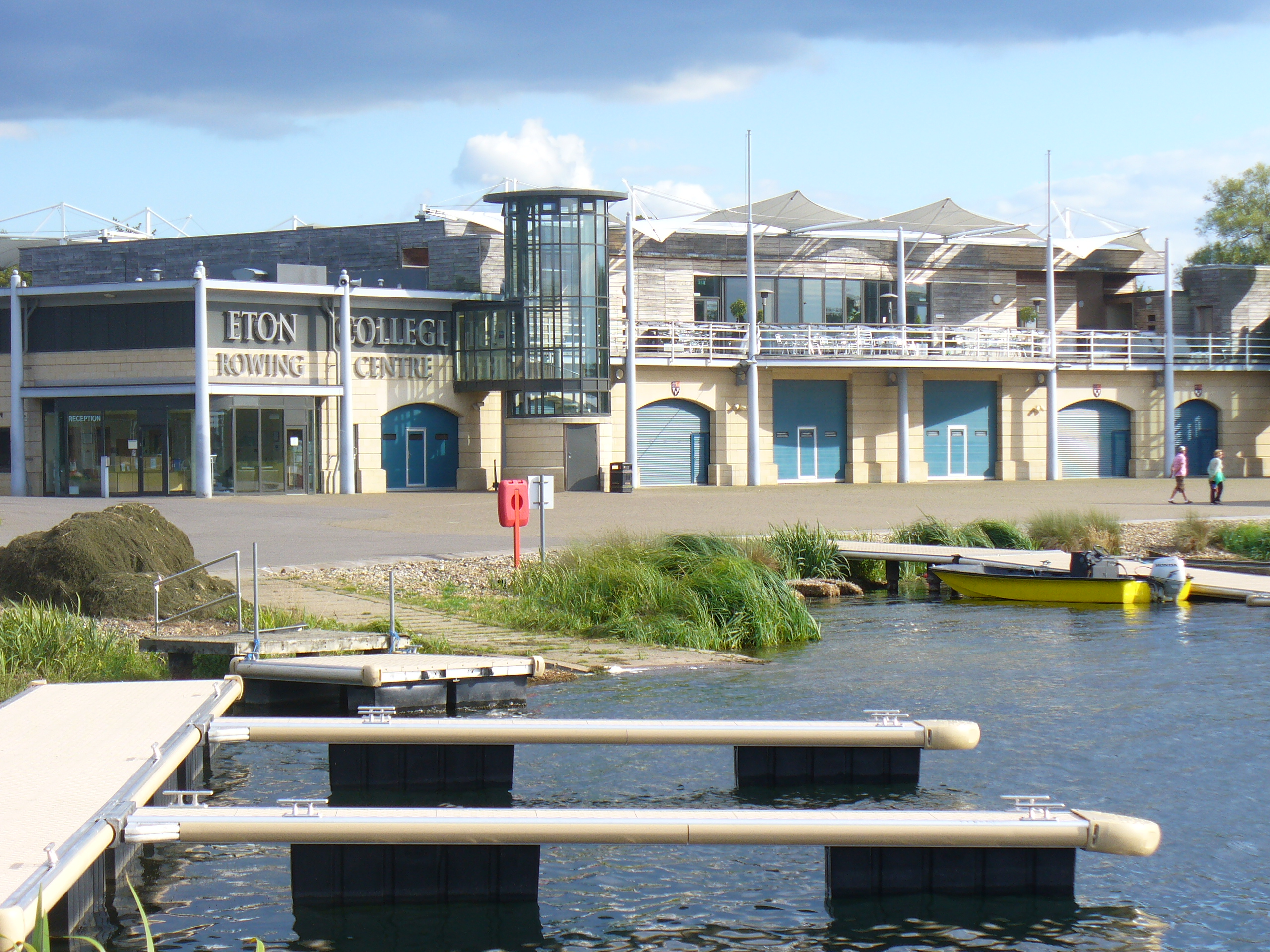
Landing stages at the rowing centre

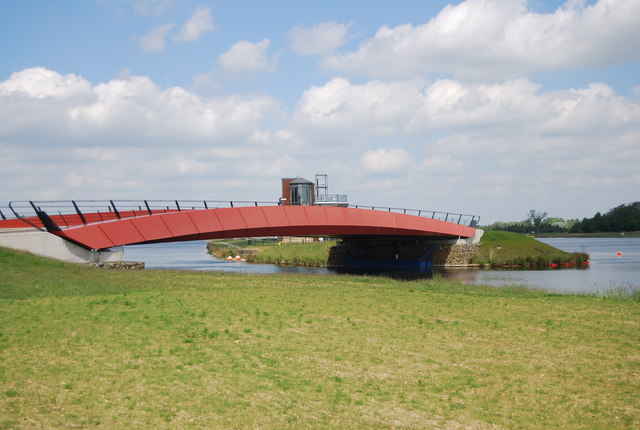
Footbridge at the lake

== See also ==
- Rowing on the River Thames
- Summerleaze Footbridge
