= Rowing at the 2012 Summer Olympics – Men's quadruple sculls =

Men's quadruple sculls at the Games of the XXX Olympiad
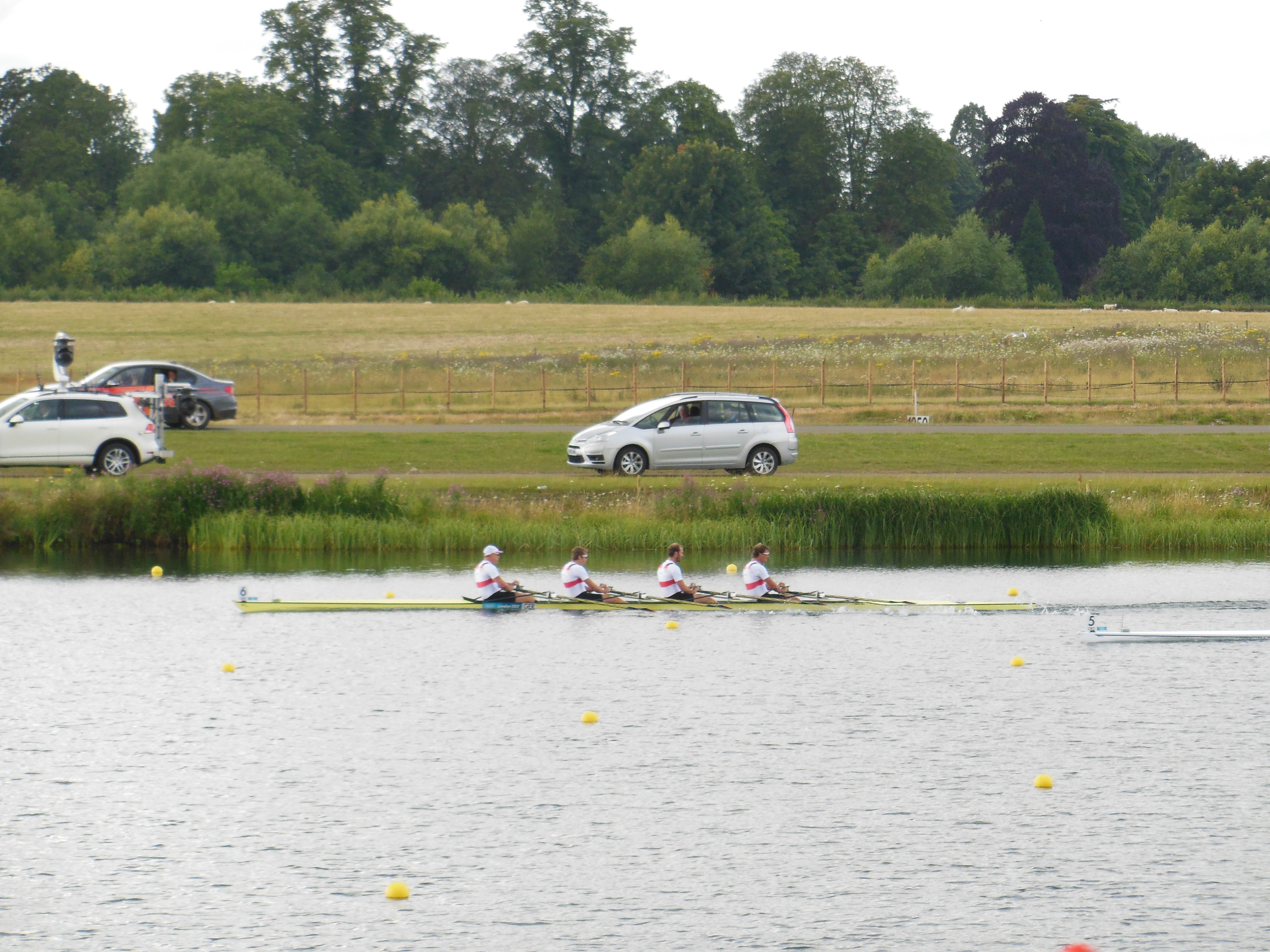
- Germany rowing to gold in the final
- Venue: Eton Dorney
- Date: 28 July – 3 August 2012
- Competitors: 52 from 13 nations
- Winning time: 5:42.48

Medalists
1st place, gold medalist(s)		Karl Schulze; Philipp Wende; Lauritz Schoof; Tim Grohmann	Germany
2nd place, silver medalist(s)		David Šain; Martin Sinković; Damir Martin; Valent Sinković	Croatia
3rd place, bronze medalist(s)		Chris Morgan; Karsten Forsterling; James McRae; Daniel Noonan	Australia

The men's quadruple sculls competition at the 2012 Summer Olympics in London took place are at Dorney Lake which, for the purposes of the Games venue, is officially termed Eton Dorney.

== Schedule ==
All times are British Summer Time (UTC+1)

Date	Time	Round
Saturday, 28 July 2012	11:30	Heats
Monday, 30 July 2012	10:00	Repechage
Wednesday, 1 August 2012	10:40	Semifinals
Friday, 3 August 2012	10:10	Final B
Friday, 3 August 2012	11:30	Final

== Results ==
=== Heats ===
First three of each heat qualify to the semifinals, remainder goes to the repechage.

==== Heat 1 ====
Rank	Rowers	Country	Time	Notes
1	Ryabtsev, Svirin, Morgachyov, Fedorovtsev	Russia	5:42.26	Q
2	Jämsä, Raja, Endrekson, Taimsoo	Estonia	5:42.87	Q
3	Chabanet, Androdias, Peltier, Hardy	France	5:44.25	Q
4	Piermarini, Osborne, Graves, Hovey	United States	5:50.25	R
5	Stefanini, Fossi, Frattini, Raineri	Italy	6:08.99	R

==== Heat 2 ====
Rank	Rowers	Country	Time	Notes
1	Šain, Sinković, Martin, Sinković	Croatia	5:39.08	Q
2	Wasielewski, Kolbowicz, Jeliński, Korol	Poland	5:40.56	Q
3	Morgan, Forsterling, McRae, Noonan	Australia	5:41.56	Q
4	Trott, Arms, Manson, Storey	New Zealand	5:41.62	R

==== Heat 3 ====
Rank	Rowers	Country	Time	Notes
1	Schulze, Wende, Schoof, Grohmann	Germany	5:39.69	Q
2	Rowbotham, Cousins, Solesbury, Wells	Great Britain	5:41.75	Q
3	Pavlovskiy, Zaitsev, Gryn, Dovgodko	Ukraine	5:43.46	Q
4	Stofer, Stahlberg, Vonarburg, Maillefer	Switzerland	5:45.13	R

=== Repechage ===
First three qualify to the semifinals.

Rank	Rowers	Country	Time	Notes
1	Trott, Arms, Manson, Storey	New Zealand	5:43.82	Q
2	Stefanini, Fossi, Frattini, Raineri	Italy	5:44.57	Q
3	Stofer, Stahlberg, Vonarburg, Maillefer	Switzerland	5:44.90	Q
4	Piermarini, Osborne, Graves, Hovey	United States	5:45.62	

=== Semifinals ===
First three qualify to Final A, remainder to Final B.

==== Semifinal 1 ====
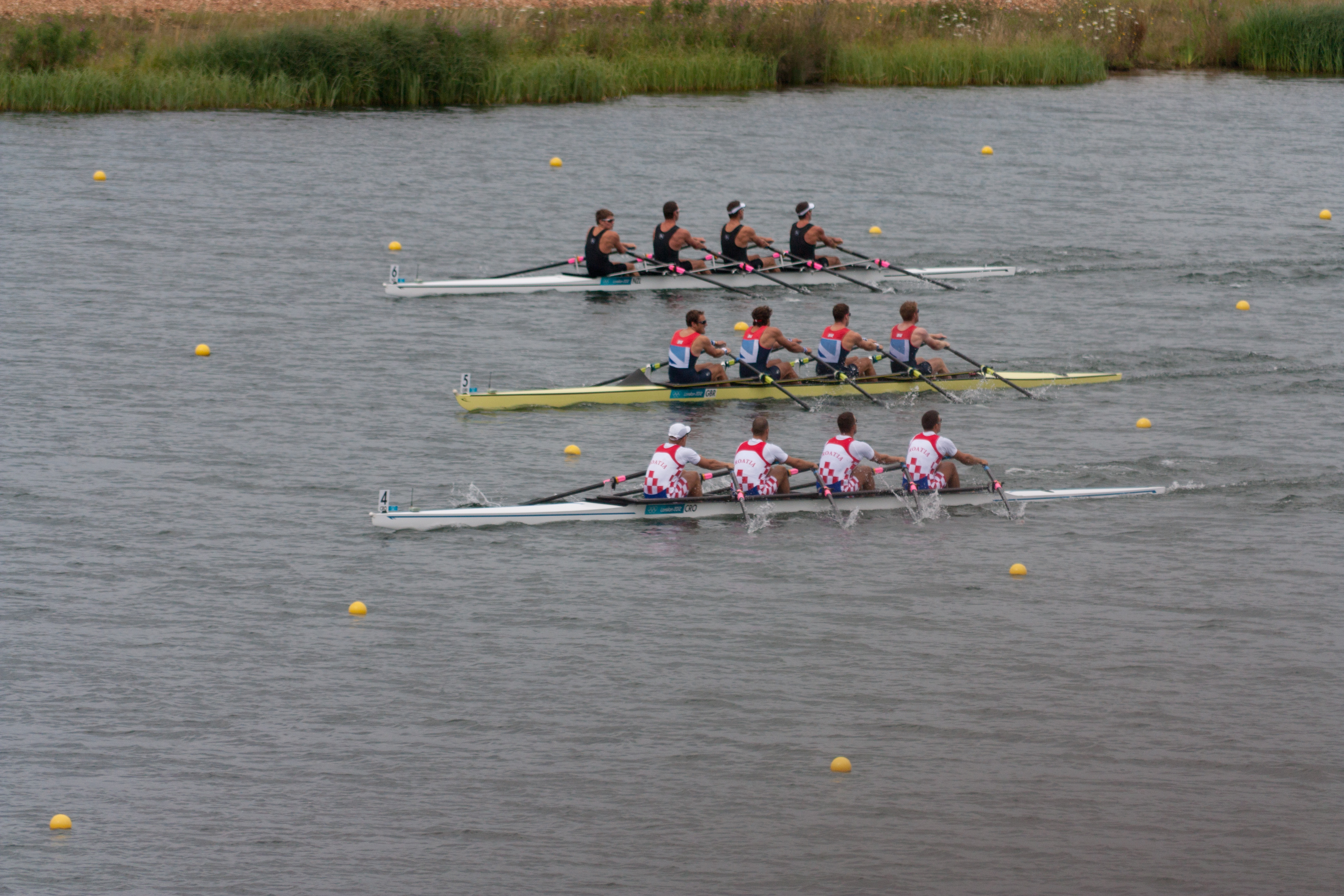
Croatia (lane 4), Great Britain (5) and New Zealand (6) in the first semifinal

Rank	Rowers	Country	Time	Notes
1	Šain, Sinković, Martin, Sinković	Croatia	6:03.39	Q
2	Morgan, Forsterling, McRae, Noonan	Australia	6:05.45	Q
3	Rowbotham, Cousins, Solesbury, Wells	Great Britain	6:05.71	Q
4	Trott, Arms, Manson, Storey	New Zealand	6:10.95	
5	Ryabtsev, Svirin, Morgachyov, Fedorovtsev	Russia	6:13.61	
6	Stofer, Stahlberg, Vonarburg, Maillefer	Switzerland	6:19.64	

==== Semifinal 2 ====
Rank	Rowers	Country	Time	Notes
1	Schulze, Wende, Schoof, Grohmann	Germany	6:05.85	Q
2	Jämsä, Raja, Endrekson, Taimsoo	Estonia	6:07.85	Q
3	Wasielewski, Kolbowicz, Jeliński, Korol	Poland	6:10.75	Q
4	Chabanet, Androdias, Peltier, Hardy	France	6:12.81	
5	Pavlovskiy, Zaitsev, Gryn, Dovgodko	Ukraine	6:16.23	
6	Stefanini, Fossi, Frattini, Raineri	Italy	6:18.96	

=== Finals ===
==== Final B ====
Rank	Rowers	Country	Time	Notes
1	Trott, Arms, Manson, Storey	New Zealand	5:58.88	
2	Ryabtsev, Svirin, Morgachyov, Fedorovtsev	Russia	5:59.17	
3	Pavlovskiy, Zaitsev, Gryn, Dovhodko	Ukraine	6:01.23	
4	Chabanet, Androdias, Peltier, Hardy	France	6:02.12	
5	Stefanini, Fossi, Frattini, Raineri	Italy	6:02.57	
6	Stofer, Stahlberg, Vonarburg, Maillefer	Switzerland	6:04.37	

==== Final A ====
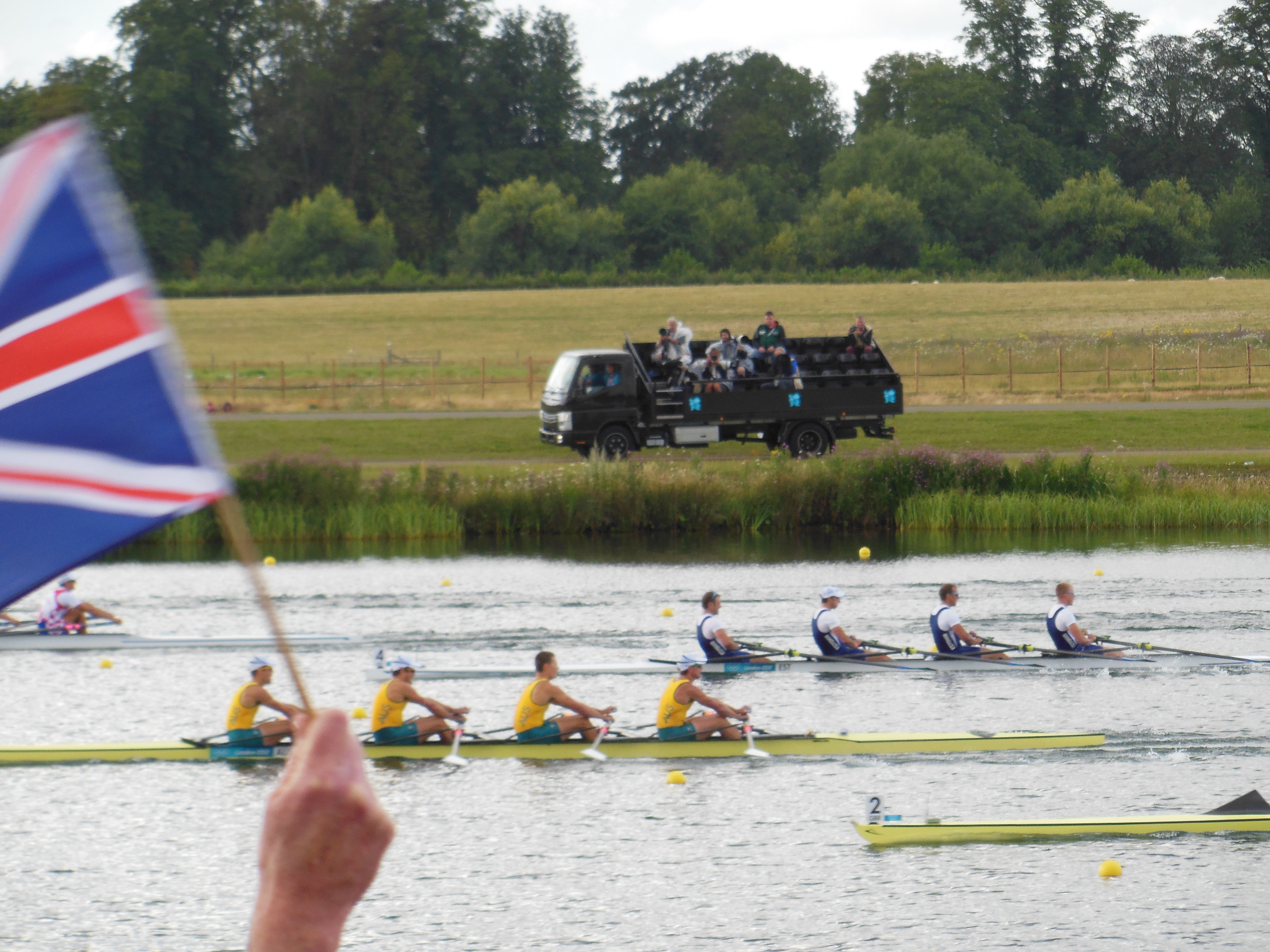
The final

Rank	Rowers	Country	Time	Notes
1st place, gold medalist(s)	Schulze, Wende, Schoof, Grohmann	Germany	5:42.48	
2nd place, silver medalist(s)	Šain, Sinković, Martin, Sinković	Croatia	5:44.78	
3rd place, bronze medalist(s)	Morgan, Forsterling, McRae, Noonan	Australia	5:45.22	
4	Jämsä, Raja, Endrekson, Taimsoo	Estonia	5:46.96	
5	Rowbotham, Cousins, Solesbury, Wells	Great Britain	5:49.19	
6	Wasielewski, Kolbowicz, Jeliński, Korol	Poland	5:51.74	
