= Spain at the 2000 Summer Olympics =

- IOC code: ESP
- NOC: Spanish Olympic Committee
- Website: www.coe.es (in Spanish)

in Sydney
- Competitors: 321 (216 men and 105 women) in 27 sports
- Flag bearer: Manuel Estiarte
- Medals Ranked 25th: Gold 3 Silver 3 Bronze 5 Total 11

Summer Olympics appearances (overview)
- 1900; 1904–1912; 1920; 1924; 1928; 1932; 1936; 1948; 1952; 1956; 1960; 1964; 1968; 1972; 1976; 1980; 1984; 1988; 1992; 1996; 2000; 2004; 2008; 2012; 2016; 2020; 2024

Spain competed at the 2000 Summer Olympics in Sydney, Australia. 321 competitors, 216 men and 105 women, took part in 165 events in 27 sports.

Sydney 2000 marked the first time the Spanish Olympic team competed in Australia as Spain and other European nations boycotted the 1956 Summer Olympics in Melbourne due to the Soviet invasion of Hungary but Spain did take part in the Equestrian events at the 1956 Summer Olympics in Stockholm five months earlier due to Australian quarantine laws.

== Medalists ==
Medal	Name	Sport	Event	Date
Gold	Isabel Fernández	Judo	Women's Lightweight (57 kg)	18 September
Gold	Joan Llaneras	Cycling	Men's points race	20 September
Gold	Gervasio Deferr	Gymnastics	Men's vault	25 September
Silver	Gabriel Esparza	Taekwondo	Men's Flyweight (58 kg)	27 September
Silver	Rafael Lozano	Boxing	Light Flyweight (48 kg)	30 September
Silver	Spain national under-23 football team: David Albelda; Iván Amaya; Miguel Angulo; Daniel Aranzubia; Joan Capdevila; Jordi Ferrón; Gabriel García de la Torre; Xavier Hernández; Jesús María Lacruz; Alberto Luque; Carlos Marchena; Felip Ortiz; Carles Puyol; José María Romero; Ismael Ruiz; Raúl Tamudo; Antonio Velamazán; Unai Vergara	Football	Men's tournament	30 September
Bronze	Nina Zhivanevskaya	Swimming	Women's 100 m backstroke	18 September
Bronze	Margarita Fullana	Cycling	Women's cross-country	23 September
Bronze	Àlex Corretja; Albert Costa	Tennis	Men's doubles	27 September
Bronze	María Vasco	Athletics	Women's 20 km walk	28 September
Bronze	Spain men's national handball team: Iñaki Urdangarín; Alberto Urdiales; Andriy Xepkin; Antonio Ortega; Juan Pérez; Antonio Ugalde; Jordi Núñez; Xavier O'Callaghan; Jesús Olalla; Rafael Guijosa; Demetrio Lozano; Enric Masip; David Barrufet; Talant Dujshebaev; Mateo Garralda	Handball	Men's tournament	30 September

Medals by sport
Sport	1st place, gold medalist(s)	2nd place, silver medalist(s)	3rd place, bronze medalist(s)	Total
Cycling	1	0	1	2
Gymnastics	1	0	0	1
Judo	1	0	0	1
Boxing	0	1	0	1
Football	0	1	0	1
Taekwondo	0	1	0	1
Athletics	0	0	1	1
Handball	0	0	1	1
Swimming	0	0	1	1
Tennis	0	0	1	1
Total	3	3	5	11

== Archery ==
Spain again sent only one archer to the Olympics. She was defeated by one point in the first round, despite being tied for the 10th highest score in the round.

Athlete	Event	Ranking round		Round of 64	Round of 32	Round of 16	Quarterfinals	Semifinals	Final / BM	
Athlete	Event	Score	Seed	Opposition Score	Opposition Score	Opposition Score	Opposition Score	Opposition Score	Opposition Score	Rank
Almudena Gallardo	Women's individual	625	36	Karaseva (BLR); L 162-163	Did not advance					

== Athletics ==
=== Men's competition ===
Men's 100 m

- Venancio Jose

- Round 1 – 10.36
- Round 2 – 10.53 (→ did not advance)

Men's 200 m

- Venancio Jose

- Round 1 – 20.95
- Round 2 – 20.79 (→ did not advance)

Men's 400 m

- David Canal

- Round 1 – 45.53
- Round 2 – 45.54 (→ did not advance)

Men's 800 m

- José Manuel Cerezo

- Round 1 – 01:48.11 (→ did not advance)

- Roberto Parra

- Round 1 – 01:48.19 (→ did not advance)

Men's 1.500 m

- Andrés Manuel Díaz

- Round 1 – 03:38.54
- Semifinal – 03:38.41
- Final – 03:37.27 (→ 7th place)

- José Antonio Redolat

- Round 1 – 03:38.66
- Semifinal – 03:45.46 (→ did not advance)

- Juan Carlos Higuero

- Round 1 – 03:40.60
- Semifinal – 03:38.37
- Final – 03:38.91 (→ 8th place)

Men's 5.000 m

- Alberto García

- Round 1 – 14:11.65 (→ did not advance)

- Yousef El Nasri

- Round 1 – 13:34.49 (→ did not advance)

Men's 10.000 m

- José Ríos

- Round 1 – 27:51.40
- Final – 28:50.31 (→ 18th place)

- Enrique Molina

- Round 1 – 28:09.76
- Final – DNF

- Teodoro Cunado

- Round 1 – 29:10.90 (→ did not advance)

Men's 400 m hurdles

- Iñigo Monreal

- Round 1 – 51.32 (→ did not advance)

Men's 4 × 400 m

- Antonio Andres, David Canal, Inigo Monreal, Eduardo Iván Rodríguez

- Round 1 – 03:06.87 (→ did not advance)

Men's 3.000 m steeplechase

- Luis Miguel Martín

- Round 1 – 08:24.04
- Final – 08:22.75 (→ 5th place)

- Eliseo Martín

- Round 1 – 08:24.97
- Final – 08:23.00 (→ 6th place)

- Marco Cepeda

- Round 1 – 08:40.01 (→ did not advance)

Men's shot put

- Manuel Martínez

- Qualifying – 19.94
- Final – 20.55 (→ 6th place)

Men's discus

- David Martinez

- Qualifying – 61.50 (→ did not advance)

Men's long jump

- Yago Lamela

- Qualifying – 7.89 (→ did not advance)

Men's triple jump

- Raul Chapado

- Qualifying – NM (→ did not advance)

Men's 20 km walk

- Paquillo Fernández

- Final – 1:21:01 (→ 7th place)

- David Márquez

- Final – 1:24:36 (→ 20th place)

- José David Domínguez

- Final – 0:01:28 (→ 35th place)

Men's 50 km walk

- Valentí Massana

- Final – 3:46:01 (→ 4th place)

- Jesús Ángel García

- Final – 3:49:31 (→ 12th place)

- Mikel Odriozola

- Final – 3:59:50 (→ 24th place)

Men's marathon

- Martín Fiz

- Final – 2:13:06 (→ 6th place)

- Alberto Juzdado

- Final – 2:21:18 (→ 42nd place)

- Abel Antón

- Final – 2:24:04 (→ 53rd place)

Men's decathlon

- Francisco Javier Benet

- 100 m – 11.42
- Long jump – 6.32
- Shot put – DNS

=== Women's competition ===
Women's 400 m

- Norfalia Carabalí

- Round 1 – 52.36
- Round 2 – 52.63 (→ did not advance)

Women's 800 m

- Mayte Martínez

- Round 1 – 01:59.60
- Semifinal – 02:03.27 (→ did not advance)

Women's 1.500 m

- Nuria Fernández

- Round 1 – 04:11.46
- Semifinal – 04:10.92 (→ did not advance)

- Natalia Rodríguez

- Round 1 – 04:22.82 (→ did not advance)

Women's 5.000 m

- Marta Domínguez

- Round 1 – 15:45.07 (→ did not advance)

- Beatriz Santiago

- Round 1 – 15:31.94 (→ did not advance)

Women's 10.000 m

- Maria Teresa Recio

- Round 1 – 33:36.44 (→ did not advance)

- Maria Abel

- Round 1 – 34:05.44 (→ did not advance)

Women's 4 × 400 m

- Julia Alba, Miriam Bravo, Norfalia Carabalí and Mayte Martínez

- Round 1 – 03:32.45 (→ did not advance)

Women's shot put

- Martina de la Puente

- Qualifying – 16.30 (→ did not advance)

Women's discus

- Alice Matějková

- Qualifying – 54.19 (→ did not advance)

Women's javelin throw

- Marta Míguez

- Qualifying – 55.52 (→ did not advance)

Women's long jump

- Concepción Montaner

- Qualifying – NM (→ did not advance)

Women's triple jump

- Carlota Castrejana

- Qualifying – 13.76 (→ did not advance)

Women's high jump

- Marta Mendía

- Qualifying – 1.89 (did not advance)

Women's pole vault

- Mari Mar Sanchez

- Qualifying – 4.25 (did not advance)

Women's 20 km walk

- María Vasco

- Final – 1:30:23 (→ Bronze medal)

- Encarnacion Granados

- Final – 1:35:06 (→ 20th place)

- Eva Perez

- Final – 1:36:35 (→ 27th place)

Women's marathon

- Ana Isabel Alonso

- Final – 2:36:45 (→ 30th place)

- Griselda González

- Final – 2:38:28 (→ 33rd place)

- Maria Luisa Munoz

- Final – 2:45:40 (→ 39th place)

Women's heptathlon

- Inma Clopés

- 100 m hurdles – 14.20
- High jump – 1.66
- Shot put – 12.70
- 200 m – 26.25
- Long jump – NM
- Javelin throw – DNS

== Basketball ==
=== Men's team competition ===
- Preliminaries (1-4)

- Defeated Angola (64-45)
- Lost to Russia (63-71)
- Lost to Canada (77-91)
- Lost to Yugoslavia (65-78)
- Lost to Australia (80-91)

- Classification matches

- 9th-10th place: defeated China (84-64) → 9th place

- Team roster

- Alberto Herreros
- Alfonso Reyes
- Carlos Jiménez
- Francisco Alberto Angulo
- Ignacio de Miguel
- Ignacio Rodríguez
- John Bernard Rogers
- Jorge Garbajosa
- Juan Carlos Navarro
- Raúl López
- Roberto Dueñas
- Rodrigo de la Fuente

== Beach volleyball ==
- Javier Bosma and Fabio Diez — 5th place (tied)

== Boxing ==
Men's light flyweight (– 48 kg)

- Rafael Lozano
  - Round 1 – bye
  - Round 2 – defeated Danilo Lerio of Philippines
  - Quarterfinal – defeated Suleiman Wanjau Bilali of Kenya
  - Semifinal – defeated Un Chol Kim of DPR of Korea
  - Final – lost to Brahim Asloum of France → Silver medal

== Canoeing ==
=== Flatwater ===
==== Men's competition ====
Men's kayak singles 500 m

- Jovino Gonzalez

- Qualifying heat – 01:40.761
- Semifinal – 01:41.168
- Final – 02:03.889 (→ 6th place)

Men's kayak singles 1.000 m

- Emilio Merchán

- Qualifying heat – 03:36.591
- Semifinal – 03:40.263
- Final – 03:39.965 (→ 9th place)

Men's canoe singles 500 m

- Jose Manuel Crespo

- Qualifying heat – 01:53.862
- Semifinal – 01:54.765 (→ did not advance)

Men's canoe singles 1.000 m

- Jose Manuel Crespo

- Qualifying heat – 04:04.528
- Semifinal – 04:04.042 (→ did not advance)

Men's canoe doubles 500 m

- José Alfredo Bea, David Mascató

- Qualifying heat – 01:44.973
- Semifinal – 01:45.677
- Final – 01:56.600 (→ 4th place)

Men's canoe doubles 1.000 m

- José Alfredo Bea, David Mascató

- Qualifying heat – 03:37.697
- Semifinal – bye
- Final – 03:54.053 (→ 9th place)

==== Women's competition ====
Women's kayak singles 500 m

- Teresa Portela

- Qualifying heat – 01:59.153
- Semifinal – 01:58.932 (→ did not advance)

Women's kayak doubles 500 m

- Maria Isabel Garcia Suarez, Belen Sanchez

- Qualifying heat – 01:45.527
- Semifinal – 01:45.144
- Final – 02:04.208 (→ 7th place)

Women's kayak fours 500 m

- Izaskun Aramburu, Beatriz Manchon, Ana María Penas, Belen Sanchez

- Qualifying heat – 01:35.298
- Semifinal – bye
- Final – 01:38.654 (→ 8th place)

=== Slalom ===
==== Men's competition ====
Men's kayak singles

- Esteban Arakama

- Qualifying – 267.75 (→ did not advance)

- Carles Juanmartí

- Qualifying – 275.88 (→ did not advance)

Men's canoe singles

- Jon Erguin

- Qualifying – 362.62 (→ did not advance)

Men's canoe doubles

- Antonio Herreros, Marc Vicente

- Qualifying – 344.62 (→ did not advance)

==== Women's competition ====
Women's kayak singles

- María Eizmendi

- Qualifying – 311.17
- Final – 276.55 (→ 14th place)

== Cycling ==
=== Cross-country mountain bike ===
Men's competition

- José Antonio Hermida

- Final – 2:11:42.91 (→ 4th place)

- Roberto Lezaun

- Final – 2:15:56.99 (→ 15th place)

Women's competition

- Margarita Fullana

- Final – 1:49:57.39 (→ Bronze medal)

- Silvia Rovira

- Final – 1:58:59.37 (→ 14th place)

=== Road cycling ===
Men's individual time trial

- Abraham Olano

- Final – 0:58:31 (→ 4th place)

- Santos González Capilla

- Final – 0:59:03 (→ 8th place)

Men's road race

- Óscar Freire

- Final – 5:30:46 (→ 17th place)

- Abraham Olano

- Final – 5:30:46 (→ 60th place)

- Juan Carlos Domínguez

- Final – DNF (→ no ranking)

- Santos González Capilla

- Final – DNF (→ no ranking)

- Miguel Ángel Martín Perdiguero

- Final – DNF (→ no ranking)

Women's individual time trial

- Joane Somarriba Arrola

- Final – 0:43:06 (→ 5th place)

- Teodora Ruano

- Final – 0:44:37.36 (→ 18th place)

Women's road race

- Joane Somarriba Arrola

- Final – 3:06:31 (→ 14th place)

- Fatima Blazquez Lozano

- Final – 3:10:33 (→ 33rd place)

- Mercedes Cagigas Amed

- Final – 3:28:29 (→ 48th place)

=== Track cycling ===
Men's sprint

- José Antonio Villanueva
  - Qualifying – 10.556
  - First round – defeated Craig MacLean of Great Britain
  - 1/8 finals – defeated Pavel Buráň of Czech Republic
  - Quarterfinal – lost to Florian Rousseau of France
  - Final 5-8 – 6th place

Men's individual pursuit

- Antonio Tauler
  - Qualifying – 04:34.415 (→ did not advance)

Men's 1 km time trial

- David Cabrero
  - Final – 01:07.710 (→ 15th place)

Men's point race

- Juan Llaneras
  - Points – 14
  - Laps down – 0 (→ Gold medal')

Men's keirin

- David Cabrero
  - First round – heat – 3; place – 3
  - Repechage – heat – 3; place – 1
  - Second round – heat – 2; place – 4 (→ did not advance)

Men's Olympic sprint

- José Antonio Escuredo, José Antonio Villanueva and Salvador Meliá
  - Qualifying – 45.799 (→ did not advance)

Men's team pursuit

- Miguel Alzamora, Isaac Gálvez, Antonio Tauler and José Francisco Jarque
  - Qualifying – 04:15.547 (did not advance)

Men's Madison

- Juan Llaneras and Isaac Gálvez
  - Final – 3 (→ 13th place)

Women's point pace

- Teodora Ruano
  - Points – 10 (→ 7th place)

== Diving ==
Men's 3 metre springboard

- Rafael Álvarez

- Preliminary – 377.55
- Semifinal – 201.06 – 578.61 (17th place, did not advance)

Men's 3 metre springboard

- Jose-Miguel Gil

- Preliminary – 318.72 (33rd place, did not advance)

Men's 10 metre platform

- Ruben Santos

- Preliminary – 300.9 (36th place, did not advance)

Women's 10 metre platform

- Santos Leire

- Preliminary – 271.41 (27th place, did not advance)

Women's 10 Metre Platform

- Dolores Sáez de Ibarra

- Preliminary – 283.41
- Semifinal – 163.11 – 446.52 (14th place, did not advance)

== Fencing ==
Four male fencers represented Spain in 2000.

Men's sabre

- Fernando Medina
- Jorge Pina
- Alberto Falcón

Men's team sabre

- Jorge Pina, Antonio García, Fernando Medina

== Football ==
=== Men's tournament ===
Group play

Team	Pld	W	D	L	GF	GA	GD	Pts
Chile	3	2	0	1	7	3	+4	6
Spain	3	2	0	1	6	3	+3	6
South Korea	3	2	0	1	2	3	−1	6
Morocco	3	0	0	3	1	7	−6	0

14 September 2000
18:30

South Korea	0–3	Spain
	Report	Velamazán 10'; José Mari 26'; Xavi 37'

Hindmarsh Stadium, Adelaide
Attendance: 14,060
Referee: Felipe Ramos (Mexico)

17 September 2000
20:00

Spain	1–3	Chile
Lacruz 54'	Report	Olarra 24'; Navia 41', 90'

Melbourne Cricket Ground, Melbourne
Attendance: 58,061
Referee: Felix Tangawarima (Zimbabwe)

20 September 2000
20:00

Spain	2–0	Morocco
José Mari 33'; Gabri 90'	Report

Melbourne Cricket Ground, Melbourne
Attendance: 24,623
Referee: Lu Jun (China)

Quarter-finals

23 September 2000
20:00

Italy	0–1	Spain
	Report	Gabri 86'

Sydney Football Stadium, Sydney
Attendance: 38,134
Referee: Carlos Simon (Brazil)

Semi-finals

26 September 2000
20:00

Spain	3–1	United States
Tamudo 16'; Angulo 25'; José Mari 87'	Report	Vagenas 42' (pen.)

Sydney Football Stadium, Sydney
Attendance: 39,800
Referee: Mourad Daami (Tunisia)

Gold medal match

30 September 2000
12:00

Spain	2–2 (a.e.t.)	Cameroon
Xavi 2'; Gabri 45+2'	Report 1 Report 2	Amaya 53' (o.g.); Eto'o 58'
Penalties
Xavi (penalty scored); Capdevila (penalty scored); Amaya (penalty missed); Albelda (penalty scored)	3–5	(penalty scored) M'Boma; (penalty scored) Eto'o; (penalty scored) Geremi; (penalty scored) Lauren; (penalty scored) Womé

Olympic Stadium, Sydney
Attendance: 104,098
Referee: Felipe Ramos (Mexico)

Team details

Spain	Cameroon

GK	1	Daniel Aranzubia	(yellow card) 90+1'
CB	12	Carles Puyol
CB	14	Iván Amaya
CB	4	Carlos Marchena
RM	16	Toni Velamazán		(substituted off) 26'
CM	6	David Albelda	(yellow card) 19'
CM	8	Xavi
LM	2	Jesús María Lacruz
AM	7	Miguel Ángel Angulo		(substituted off) 75'
CF	17	Raúl Tamudo		(substituted off) 49'
CF	9	José Mari	(yellow card) 55' (yellow-red card) 90+1'
Substitutes:
MF	10	Gabri	(red card) 70'	(substituted on) 26'
DF	11	Jordi Ferrón		(substituted on) 49'
DF	3	Joan Capdevila		(substituted on) 75'
Manager:
Iñaki Sáez

GK	18	Carlos Kameni
SW	13	Aaron Nguimbat		(substituted off) 46'
CB	5	Patrice Abanda	(yellow card) 25'
CB	4	Serge Mimpo
RWB	12	Lauren
LWB	17	Serge Branco		(substituted off) 91'
DM	7	Nicolas Alnoudji		(substituted off) 111'
RM	8	Geremi
LM	3	Pierre Womé
AM	10	Patrick M'Boma
CF	9	Samuel Eto'o
Substitutes:
MF	11	Daniel Kome		(substituted on) 46'
MF	15	Joël Epalle		(substituted on) 91'
FW	2	Albert Meyong		(substituted on) 111'
Manager:
Jean-Paul Akono

== Gymnastics ==
=== Men ===
Artistic

Athlete	Event	Apparatus						Total	Rank
Athlete	Event	F	PM	R	V	PB	HB	Total	Rank
Alejandro Barrenechea	All-around	8.162	8.612	9.575	9.237	9.587	9.237	54.410	34
Víctor Cano	All-around	9.087	9.650	9.462	8.825	8.875	9.662	55.561	31
Omar Cortes	All-around	8.112	9.675	9.550	9.325	9.537	9.650	55.849	26
Gervasio Deferr	Vault	—N/a			9.712	—N/a		9.712	1st place, gold medalist(s)

=== Women ===
Artistic
Team

Individual events

Athlete	Event	Apparatus				Total	Rank
Athlete	Event	V	UB	BB	F	Total	Rank
Laura Martinez	All-around	9.518	9.612	9.062	9.637	37.829	12
Laura Martinez	Vault	9.612	—N/a			9.612	5
Sara Moro	All-around	9.318	9.637	8.725	9.650	37.330	21
Esther Moya	All-around	9.631	9.550	9.187	9.712	38.080	9
Esther Moya	Floor	—N/a			9.700	9.700	4
Esther Moya	Vault	9.612	—N/a			9.612	4

== Field hockey ==
=== Men's team competition ===
- Preliminary round (Group B):

- Spain — South Korea 1-1
- Spain — Poland 1-4
- Spain — Australia 2-2
- Spain — India 2-3
- Spain — Argentina 1-5

- Classification matches:

- 9th-12th place: Spain — Malaysia 1-0
- 9th-10th place: Spain — Canada 3-0 → Ninth place

- Team roster

- Jaime Amat
- Pablo Amat
- Javier Arnau
- Jordi Casas
- Juan Dinarés
- Juan Escarré
- Francisco "Kiko" Fábregas
- Rodrigo Garza
- Bernardino Herrera
- Ramón Jufresa
- Joaquín Malgosa
- Xavier Ribas
- Josep Sánchez
- Ramón Sala
- Eduardo Tubau
- Pablo Usoz

- Head coach: Antonio Forrellat

=== Women's team competition ===
- Preliminary round (Group A):

- Spain — South Korea 0-0
- Spain — Australia 1-1
- Spain — Argentina 1-1
- Spain — Great Britain 0-2

- Medal round:

- Spain — China 0-0
- Spain — New Zealand 2-2
- Spain — Netherlands 1-2

- Bronze medal game:

- Spain — Netherlands 0-2 → Fourth place

- Team roster

- Amanda González
- Begoña Larzabal
- Cibeles Romero
- Elena Carrión
- Elena Urkizu
- Erdoitza Goikoetxea
- Lucía López
- María Carmen Barea
- Maider Tellería
- María del Carmen Martín
- María del Mar Feito
- Núria Camón
- Nuria Moreno
- Silvia Muñoz
- Sonia Barrio
- Sonia de Ignacio

- Head coach: Marc Lammers

== Judo ==
=== Men ===
- Óscar Peñas - 60 kg - Round of 16
- Kiyoshi Uematsu - 66 kg - Repechage Second Round
- Ricardo Echarte - 81 kg - Round of 32
- Fernando González - 90 kg - Round of 16
- Ernesto Pérez - +100 kg - Round of 16

=== Women ===
- Vanesa Arenas - 48 kg - Repechage First Round
- Miren León - 52 kg - Round of 16
- Isabel Fernández - 57 kg - Gold
- Sara Álvarez - 63 kg - Round of 16
- Úrsula Martín - 70 kg - Bronze medal final
- Esther San Miguel - 78 kg - Round of 16
- Beatriz Martín - +78 - Round of 32

== Rowing ==
Athlete	Event	Heats		Repechage		Semifinals		Final	
Athlete	Event	Time	Rank	Time	Rank	Time	Rank	Time	Rank
Mauricio Monteserín; Jaime Ríos	Men's double sculls	6:42.69	6 R	6:46.50	5 FC	BYE		6:40.17	16
Juan Zunzunegui; Rubén Álvarez	Men's lightweight double sculls	6:34.89	2 R	6:39.20	1 Q	6:39.49	6 FB	6:31.49	9

Qualification Legend: FA=Final A (medal); FB=Final B (non-medal); FC=Final C (non-medal); FD=Final D (non-medal); FE=Final E (non-medal); FF=Final F (non-medal); SA/B=Semifinals A/B; SC/D=Semifinals C/D; SE/F=Semifinals E/F; QF=Quarterfinals; R=Repechage

== Sailing ==
Spain competed in nine events in the Sailing competition at the Sydney Olympics. In seven of the events, they finished in the top 10 but were unable to win a medal. This was the first time since 1972 that Spain failed to win an Olympic medal in sailing.

Men

Athlete	Event	Race											Net points	Final rank
Athlete	Event	1	2	3	4	5	6	7	8	9	10	11	Net points	Final rank
Jorge Maciel	Mistral One Design	16	17	~~25~~	8	25	22	20	20	~~DNF~~	15	19	162.0	22
Gustavo Martínez; Kiko Sánchez	470	17	11	15	9	~~18~~	3	12	2	8	4	~~21~~	76.0	10

Women

Athlete	Event	Race											Net points	Final rank
Athlete	Event	1	2	3	4	5	6	7	8	9	10	11	Net points	Final rank
María del Carmen Vaz	Mistral One Design	4	5	~~14~~	9	~~19~~	11	8	9	6	14	6	72.0	8
Neus Garriga	Europe	10	2	11	13	5	1	~~17~~	3	11	5	~~OCS~~	61.0	4
Natalia Via Dufresne; Sandra Azon	470	14	~~18~~	5	2	~~19~~	3	11	2	4	9	5	55.0	6

Open
Fleet racing

Athlete	Event	Race																Net points	Final rank
Athlete	Event	1	2	3	4	5	6	7	8	9	10	11	12	13	14	15	16	Net points	Final rank
Luis Martínez	Laser	3	~~23~~	16	8	~~44~~	23	5	3	16	13	10	—N/a					97.0	11
Santiago López-Vázquez; Javier de la Plaza	49er	1	8	11	8	4	3	1	11	11	~~OCS~~	5	1	1	~~12~~	10	4	79.0	4
Fernando León Boissier; José Luis Ballester	Tornado	7	9	9	~~14~~	6	~~12~~	9	3	9	4	2	—N/a					58.0	9
José van der Ploeg; Rafael Trujillo	Star	2	4	~~DSQ~~	3	11	7	4	10	3	11	~~OCS~~	—N/a					55.0	8

Match racing

Athlete	Event	Qualification races						Total	Rank	Round robin					Rank	Quarterfinals	Semifinals	Final / BM	Rank
Athlete	Event	1	2	3	4	5	6	Total	Rank	1	2	3	4	5	Rank	Quarterfinals	Semifinals	Final / BM	Rank
Manuel Doreste; Domingo Manrique; Juan Luis Wood	Soling	15	12	~~16~~	15	8	6	58.0	16	—N/a									

== Shooting ==
Four Spanish shooters (two men and two women) qualified to compete in the following events:

Men

Athlete	Event	Qualification		Final	
Athlete	Event	Points	Rank	Points	Rank
Jorge González	50 m rifle three positions	1150	33	Did not advance	
Jorge González	50 m rifle prone	593	19	Did not advance	
Jorge González	10 m air rifle	DNS		Did not advance	
Sergio Piñero	Double trap	129	17	Did not advance	

Women

Athlete	Event	Qualification		Final	
Athlete	Event	Points	Rank	Points	Rank
Marina Pons	50 m rifle three positions	565	34	Did not advance	
Marina Pons	10 m air rifle	388	36	Did not advance	
Maria Pilar Fernandez	10 m air pistol	379	16	Did not advance	
Maria Pilar Fernandez	25 m pistol	575	20	Did not advance	

== Swimming ==
Men's 50m freestyle

- Eduardo Lorente

- Preliminary heat – 22.96 (→ did not advance)

Men's 100m freestyle

- Javier Botello

- Preliminary heat – 50.87 (→ did not advance)

Men's 1500m freestyle

- Frederik Hviid

- Preliminary heat – 15:14.37 (→ did not advance)

- Teo Edo

- Preliminary heat – 15:32.01 (→ did not advance)

Men's 200m butterfly

- Jorge Pérez

- Preliminary heat – 02:00.15 (→ did not advance)

Men's 100m backstroke

- David Ortega

- Preliminary heat – 55.8
- Semifinal – 56.33 (→ did not advance)

Men's 200m backstroke

- Guillermo Mediano

- Preliminary heat – 02:03.45 (→ did not advance)

Men's 200m individual medley

- Jordi Carrasco

- Preliminary heat – 02:02.89 (→ did not advance)

Men's 400m individual medley

- Frederik Hviid

- Preliminary heat – 04:21.63 (→ did not advance)

Men's 4 × 100 m freestyle

- Jorge Luis Ulibarri, Eduardo Lorente, Juan Benavides and Javier Botello

- Preliminary heat – 03:22.76 (→ did not advance)

Men's 4 × 100 m medley relay

- David Ortega, Santiago Castellanos, Daniel Morales and Javier Botello

- Preliminary heat – 03:42.76 (→ did not advance)

Women's 50m freestyle

- Ana Belén Palomo

- Preliminary heat – 25.96 (→ did not advance)

Women's 200m freestyle

- Laura Roca

- Preliminary heat – 02:03.37 (→ did not advance)

Women's 400m freestyle

- Angels Bardina

- Preliminary heat – 04:17.55 (→ did not advance)

Women's 100m butterfly

- María Peláez

- Preliminary heat – 01:01.47 (→ did not advance)

Women's 200m butterfly

- Mireia García

- Preliminary heat – 02:10.96
- Semifinal – 02:10.24 (→ did not advance)

- María Peláez

- Preliminary heat – 02:14.66 (→ did not advance)

Women's 200m breaststroke

- Lourdes Becerra

- Preliminary heat – DNS (→ did not advance)

Women's 100m backstroke

- Nina Zhivanevskaya

- Preliminary heat – 01:01.97
- Semifinal – 01:01.41
- Final – 01:00.89 (→ Bronze medal)

Women's 200m backstroke

- Nina Zhivanevskaya

- Preliminary heat – 02:11.60
- Semifinal – 02:11.93
- Final – 02:12.75 (→ 6th place)

- Ivette María

- Preliminary heat – 02:14.78
- Semifinal – 02:15.11 (→ did not advance)

Women's 400m individual medley

- Lourdes Becerra

- Preliminary heat – 04:47.50 (→ did not advance)

Women's 4 × 200 m freestyle relay

- Angels Bardina, Natalia Cabrerizo, Paula Carballido and Laura Roca

- Preliminary heat – 08:13.62 (→ did not advance)

Women's 4 × 100 m medley relay

- María Carmen Collado, Mireia García, Ivette María and Laura Roca

- Preliminary heat – 04:15.54 (→ did not advance)

== Synchronized swimming ==
Duet

- Gemma Mengual, Paola Tirados

- Technical routine – 32.9
- Free routine – 61.62
- Final – 94.52 (8th place)

== Triathlon ==
Three of Spain's four triathletes finished the inaugural Olympic triathlon. Ivan Rana was the only one to place in the top eight, with a fifth-place finish in the men's event.

Women's competition:

- Maribel Blanco — 2:06:37.84 (24th place)

Men's competition:

- Iván Raña — 1:49:10.88 (5th place)
- Eneko Llanos — 1:50:48.35 (23rd place)
- Jose Maria Merchan — did not finish

== Volleyball ==
=== Men's team competition ===
Preliminary round (Group A)

Pos	Team	Pld	W	L	Pts	SW	SL	SR	SPW	SPL	SPR	Qualification
1	Brazil	5	5	0	10	15	1	15.000	415	331	1.254	Quarterfinals
2	Netherlands	5	4	1	9	12	5	2.400	417	360	1.158	Quarterfinals
3	Cuba	5	3	2	8	9	7	1.286	383	335	1.143	Quarterfinals
4	Australia	5	2	3	7	6	10	0.600	327	374	0.874	Quarterfinals
5	Spain	5	1	4	6	7	12	0.583	404	444	0.910	
6	Egypt	5	0	5	5	1	15	0.067	309	411	0.752	

- Defeated Egypt (3-0)
- Lost to Cuba (1-3)
- Lost to Australia (1-3)
- Lost to Brazil (1-3)
- Lost to the Netherlands (1-3) → did not advance, ninth place overall

Team roster

- Carlos Carreño
- José Antonio Casilla
- Enrique de la Fuente
- Miguel Angel Falasca
- José Luis Moltó
- Rafael Pascual
- Cosme Prenafeta
- Juan Carlos Robles
- Ernesto Rodríguez
- Juan José Salvador
- Luis Pedro Suela
- Alexis Valido

Head coach: Raúl Lozano

== Water polo ==
=== Men's tournament ===
Pos	Team	Pld	W	D	L	GF	GA	GD	Pts	Qualification
1	Russia	5	4	1	0	51	28	+23	9	Quarter Finals
2	Italy	5	4	1	0	43	32	+11	9	Quarter Finals
3	Spain	5	2	1	2	32	34	−2	5	Quarter Finals
4	Australia (H)	5	1	2	2	38	36	+2	4	Quarter Finals
5	Kazakhstan	5	1	1	3	41	46	−5	3	
6	Slovakia	5	0	0	5	30	59	−29	0	

Source: LA84
Rules for classification: 1) Points; 2) Head-to-head points; 3) Head-to-head goal difference; 4) Head-to-head goals scored; 5) Goal difference.
(H) Hosts
- Preliminary round: 2-2-1
- Quarterfinal: defeated Croatia, 9-8
- Semifinal: lost to Russia, 8-7
- Bronze medal game: Lost to Yugoslavia, 8-3 → 4th place
- Team roster

- Ángel Andreo
- Daniel Ballart
- Daniel Moro
- Gabriel Hernández Paz
- Gustavo Marcos
- Iván Moro
- Javier Sánchez-Toril
- Jesús Rollán
- Jordi Sans
- Manuel Estiarte
- Pedro Francisco García
- Salvador Gómez
- Sergi Pedrerol

== Weightlifting ==
Men

Athlete	Event	Snatch			Clean & jerk			Total	Rank
Athlete	Event	1	2	3	1	2	3	Total	Rank
Jon Tecedor	+ 105 kg	170.0	175.0	~~180.0~~	210.0	215.0	220.0	395.0	13

Women

Athlete	Event	Snatch			Clean & jerk			Total	Rank
Athlete	Event	1	2	3	1	2	3	Total	Rank
Josefa Pérez	– 63 kg	80.0	82.5	85.0	95.0	100.0	102.5	187.5	7
Mónica Carrio	– 75 kg	92.5	~~95.0~~	95.0	~~110.0~~	110.0	~~115.0~~	205.0	9

== Notes ==
- Spanish Olympic Committee Archived 12 March 2007 at the Wayback Machine
- Wallechinsky, David (2004). The Complete Book of the Summer Olympics (Athens 2004 Edition). Toronto, Canada. ISBN .
- International Olympic Committee (2001). The Results. Retrieved 12 November 2005.
- Sydney Organising Committee for the Olympic Games (2001). Official Report of the XXVII Olympiad Volume 1: Preparing for the Games. Retrieved 20 November 2005.
- Sydney Organising Committee for the Olympic Games (2001). Official Report of the XXVII Olympiad Volume 2: Celebrating the Games. Retrieved 20 November 2005.
- Sydney Organising Committee for the Olympic Games (2001). The Results. Retrieved 20 November 2005.
- International Olympic Committee website

== Bibliography ==
- Higham, James (2012). Sport Tourism Destinations. Routledge. ISBN 978-0-7506-5937-6.
