= Rowing at the 2000 Summer Olympics – Men's double sculls =

Men's double sculls at the Games of the XXVII Olympiad
- Venue: Sydney International Regatta Centre
- Date: 17–23 September 2000
- Competitors: 32 from 16 nations
- Winning time: 6:16.33

Medalists
1st place, gold medalist(s)		Luka Špik; Iztok Čop	Slovenia
2nd place, silver medalist(s)		Olaf Tufte; Fredrik Bekken	Norway
3rd place, bronze medalist(s)		Giovanni Calabrese; Nicola Sartori	Italy

The men's double sculls competition at the 2000 Summer Olympics in Sydney, Australia took place are at Sydney International Regatta Centre.

== Competition format ==
This rowing event is a double scull event, meaning that each boat is propelled by a pair of rowers. The "scull" portion means that each rower uses two oars, one on each side of the boat; this contrasts with sweep rowing in which each rower has one oar and rows on only one side. The competition consists of multiple rounds. Finals were held to determine the placing of each boat; these finals were given letters with those nearer to the beginning of the alphabet meaning a better ranking. Semifinals were named based on which finals they fed, with each semifinal having two possible finals.

With 16 boats in heats, the best boats qualify directly for the semi-finals. All other boats progress to the repechage round, which offers a second chance to qualify for the semi-finals. Unsuccessful boats from the repechage must proceed to final C, which determines the last four places, from 13–16. The best three boats in each of the two semi-finals qualify for final A, which determines places 1–6 (including the medals). Unsuccessful boats from semi-finals A/B go forward to final B, which determines places 7–12.

== Schedule ==
All times are Australian Time (UTC+10)

Date	Time	Round
Sunday, 17 September 2000	11:00	Heats
Tuesday, 19 September 2000	10:40	Repechages
Thursday, 21 September 2000	09:30	Semifinals
Friday, 22 September 2000	11:00	Final B
Friday, 22 September 2000	11:40	Final C
Saturday, 23 September 2000	10:10	Final

== Results ==
=== Heats ===
The winner of each heat advanced to the semifinals, remainder goes to the repechage.

==== Heat 1 ====
Rank	Rower	Country	Time	Notes
1	Tibor Pető; Ákos Haller	Hungary	6:28.33	Q
2	Adam Korol; Marek Kolbowicz	Poland	6:31.91	R
3	Frédéric Kowal; Adrien Hardy	France	6:32.69	R
4	Todd Hallett; Dominic Seiterle	Canada	6:35.41	R
5	Ivan Jukić; Tihomir Jarnjević	Croatia	6:39.69	R
6	Mauricio Monteserín; Jaime Ríos	Spain	6:42.69	R

==== Heat 2 ====
Rank	Rower	Country	Time	Notes
1	Luka Špik; Iztok Čop	Slovenia	6:24.92	Q
2	Giovanni Calabrese; Nicola Sartori	Italy	6:33.11	R
3	Henry Nuzum; Mike Ferry	United States	6:37.81	R
4	Leonid Gulov; Andrei Šilin	Estonia	6:41.74	R
5	Bertil Samuelson; Bo Kaliszan	Denmark	6:58.88	R

==== Heat 3 ====
Rank	Rower	Country	Time	Notes
1	Olaf Tufte; Fredrik Bekken	Norway	6:25.63	Q
2	Sebastian Mayer; Stefan Roehnert	Germany	6:34.66	R
3	Kostyantyn Zaytsev; Kostyantyn Pronenko	Ukraine	6:38.06	R
4	Yoennis Hernández; Yosbel Martínez	Cuba	6:40.27	R
5	Hua Lingjun; Liang Hongming	China	6:50.94	R

=== Repechage ===
First three qualify to semifinals A/B, the remainder to final C.

==== Repechage 1 ====
Rank	Rower	Country	Time	Notes
1	Adam Korol; Marek Kolbowicz	Poland	6:32.30	A/B
2	Henry Nuzum; Mike Ferry	United States	6:34.56	A/B
3	Yoennis Hernández; Yosbel Martínez	Cuba	6:35.76	A/B
4	Ivan Jukić; Tihomir Jarnjević	Croatia	6:43.60	C

==== Repechage 2 ====
Rank	Rower	Country	Time	Notes
1	Giovanni Calabrese; Nicola Sartori	Italy	6:25.98	A/B
2	Bertil Samuelson; Bo Kaliszan	Denmark	6:30.87	A/B
3	Kostyantyn Zaytsev; Kostyantyn Pronenko	Ukraine	6:33.23	A/B
4	Todd Hallett; Dominic Seiterle	Canada	6:35.04	C

==== Repechage 3 ====
Rank	Rower	Country	Time	Notes
1	Sebastian Mayer; Stefan Roehnert	Germany	6:27.58	A/B
2	Frédéric Kowal; Adrien Hardy	France	6:31.28	A/B
3	Leonid Gulov; Andrei Šilin	Estonia	6:35.09	A/B
4	Hua Lingjun; Liang Hongming	China	6:43.64	C
5	Mauricio Monteserín; Jaime Ríos	Spain	6:46.50	C

=== Semifinals ===
First three places advance to Final A, the remainder to Final B.

==== Semifinal 1 ====
Rank	Rower	Country	Time	Notes
1	Luka Špik; Iztok Čop	Slovenia	6:16.41	A
2	Sebastian Mayer; Stefan Roehnert	Germany	6:20.40	A
3	Tibor Pető; Ákos Haller	Hungary	6:23.81	A
4	Henry Nuzum; Mike Ferry	United States	6:28.49	B
5	Leonid Gulov; Andrei Šilin	Estonia	6:38.75	B
6	Bertil Samuelson; Bo Kaliszan	Denmark	6:40.11	B

==== Semifinal 2 ====
Rank	Rower	Country	Time	Notes
1	Olaf Tufte; Fredrik Bekken	Norway	6:23.50	A
2	Giovanni Calabrese; Nicola Sartori	Italy	6:24.99	A
3	Adam Korol; Marek Kolbowicz	Poland	6:31.26	A
4	Frédéric Kowal; Adrien Hardy	France	6:32.09	B
5	Kostyantyn Zaytsev; Kostyantyn Pronenko	Ukraine	6:36.92	B
6	Yoennis Hernández; Yosbel Martínez	Cuba	6:40.71	B

=== Finals ===
==== Final C ====
Rank	Rower	Country	Time	Notes
1	Todd Hallett; Dominic Seiterle	Canada	6:28.61	
2	Ivan Jukić; Tihomir Jarnjević	Croatia	6:31.78	
3	Hua Lingjun; Liang Hongming	China	6:36.97	
4	Mauricio Monteserín; Jaime Ríos	Spain	6:40.17	

==== Final B ====
Rank	Rower	Country	Time	Notes
1	Frédéric Kowal; Adrien Hardy	France	6:20.72	
2	Henry Nuzum; Mike Ferry	United States	6:21.71	
3	Leonid Gulov; Andrei Šilin	Estonia	6:22.78	
4	Bertil Samuelson; Bo Kaliszan	Denmark	6:23.20	
5	Kostyantyn Zaytsev; Kostyantyn Pronenko	Ukraine	6:36.92	
6	Yoennis Hernández; Yosbel Martínez	Cuba	6:40.71	

==== Final A ====
Rank	Rower	Country	Time	Notes
1st place, gold medalist(s)	Luka Špik; Iztok Čop	Slovenia	6:16.63	
2nd place, silver medalist(s)	Olaf Tufte; Fredrik Bekken	Norway	6:17.98	
3rd place, bronze medalist(s)	Giovanni Calabrese; Nicola Sartori	Italy	6:20.49	
4	Sebastian Mayer; Stefan Roehnert	Germany	6:23.58	
5	Tibor Pető; Ákos Haller	Hungary	6:27.04	
6	Adam Korol; Marek Kolbowicz	Poland	6:32.11	
