= Tim Grohmann =

German rower (born 1988)

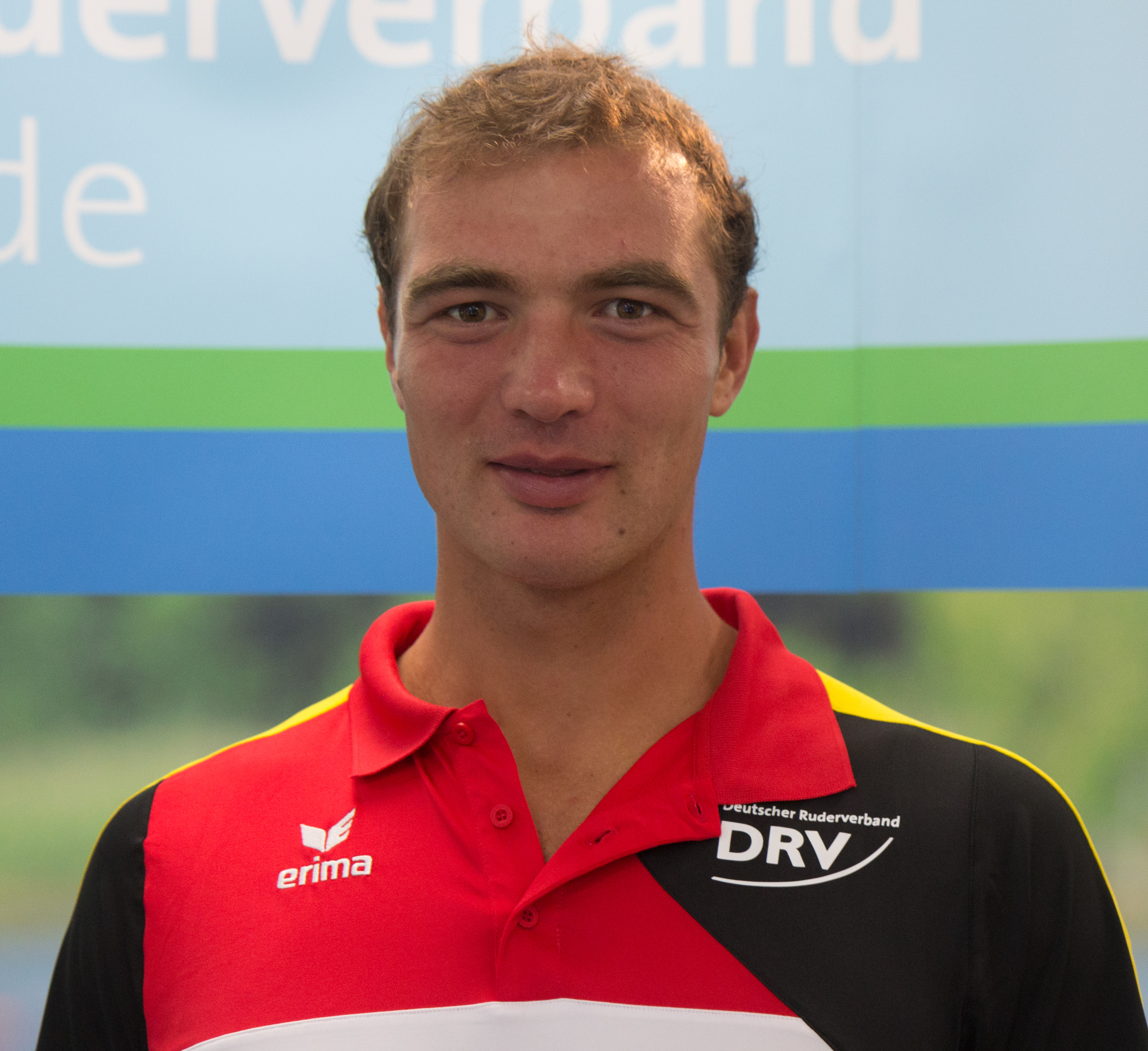

Personal information
- Born: 27 December 1988 (age 37) Dresden, East Germany
Medal record
Men's rowing
Representing Germany
Olympic Games
Gold medal – first place	2012 London	Quadruple sculls
World Championships
Silver medal – second place	2011 Bled	Quadruple sculls
Silver medal – second place	2013 Chungjiu	Quadruple sculls
Bronze medal – third place	2009 Poznań	Quadruple sculls
Bronze medal – third place	2014 Amsterdam	Quadruple sculls
European Championships
Gold medal – first place	2013 Seville	Quadruple sculls
Bronze medal – third place	2014 Belgrade	Quadruple sculls

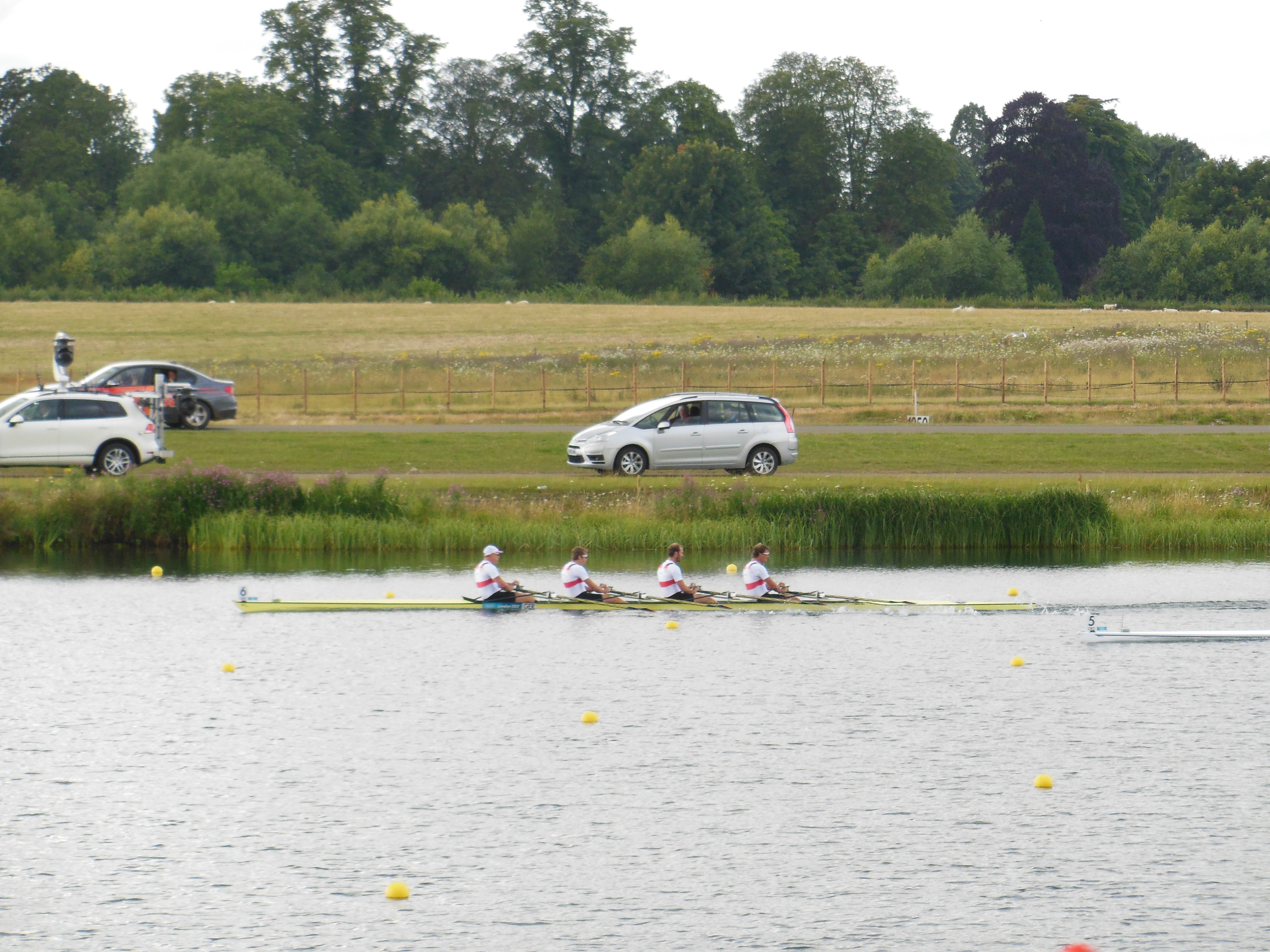
Rowing the quadruple sculls final at the 2012 Summer Olympics

Tim Grohmann (born 27 December 1988) is a German rower. He was part of the German crew that won the gold medal in the men's quadruple sculls at the 2012 Summer Olympics in London, with Karl Schulze, Philipp Wende and Lauritz Schoof.

The Olympic winning team also won silver at the 2011 World Championships. Previously, Grohmann had won bronze at the 2009 World Championships with Karsten Brodowski, Marcel Hacker and Tim Bartels.

Grohmann won gold at the 2013 European Championships and silver at the 2013 World Rowing Championships with Karl Schulze, Paul Heinrich and Lauritz Schoof. He won bronze at the 2014 World Championships and the 2014 European Championships with Karl Schulze, Kai Fuhrmann and Philipp Wende.
