= Lauritz Schoof =

German rower (born 1990)

Personal information
- Born: 7 October 1990 (age 35) Rendsburg, Germany
- Height: 195 cm (6 ft 5 in)
- Weight: 96 kg (212 lb)
Medal record
Men's rowing
Representing Germany
Olympic Games
Gold medal – first place	2012 London	M4x
Gold medal – first place	2016 Rio de Janeiro	M4x
World Championships
Gold medal – first place	2015 Aiguebelette	M4x
Silver medal – second place	2011 Bled	M4x
Silver medal – second place	2013 Chungjiu	M4x

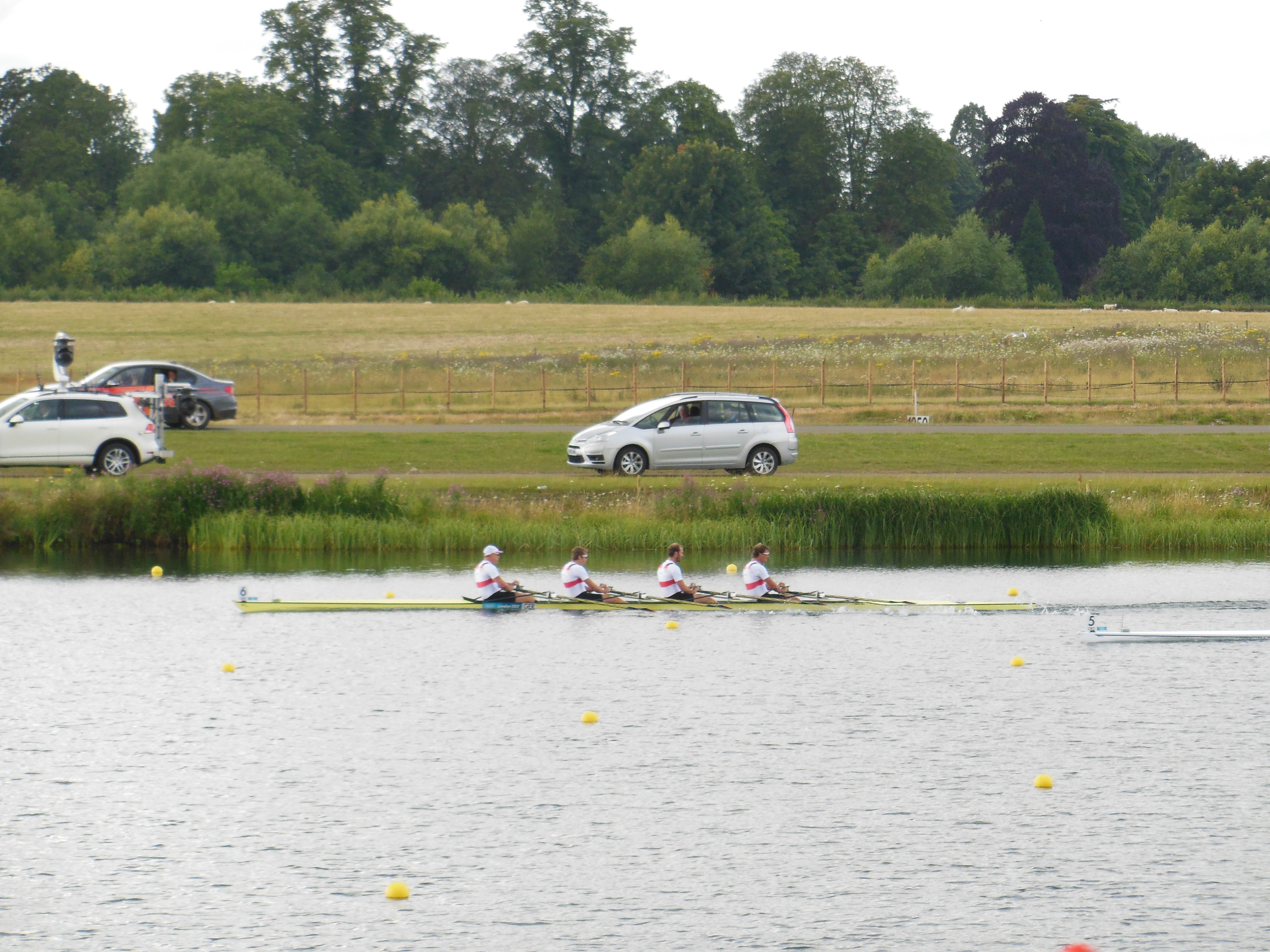
Rowing the quadruple sculls final at the 2012 Summer Olympics

Lauritz Schoof (born 7 October 1990 in Rendsburg) is a German rower. He was part of the German crew that won the gold medal in the men's quadruple sculls at the 2012 Summer Olympics in London. He also successfully defended the quadruple sculls title at the 2016 Rio Olympics as part of the German team.

== Career ==
Schoof was successful at junior and under-23 level, winning a silver medal at the World Junior Championships in the men's quadruple sculls (with Mario Jadatz, Christopher Schang and Bastian Bechler), and gold in the junior men's double sculls with Martin Menger, as well as winning gold in the single sculls at the 2009 U23 World Championship.

His first senior World Championship medal came in 2011, when he was part of the German team that won the silver medal behind Australia. His teammates were Karl Schulze, Philipp Wende and Tim Grohmann. This was also the team that won gold at the 2012 Summer Olympics.

In 2013, the team of Schoof, Schulze, Grohmann and Paul Heinrich won the European quadruple sculls title. That team then came second to Croatia at the 2013 World Championships.

In 2015, Schoof, Schulze, Wende and Hans Gruhne won the men's quadruple sculls at the World Championship. This was the team that retained the Olympic title when the German quadruple sculls team won gold at the 2016 Olympics.
