= Jaime Rios =

Jaime Rios may refer to:

- Jaime Rios (boxer) (1953-2019) the inaugural WBA Light Flyweight boxing champion
- Jaime Rios (judge) New York Supreme Court judge
- Jaime Ríos (rower) (born 1977) Spanish Olympic rower
