= Henry Nuzum =

American rower

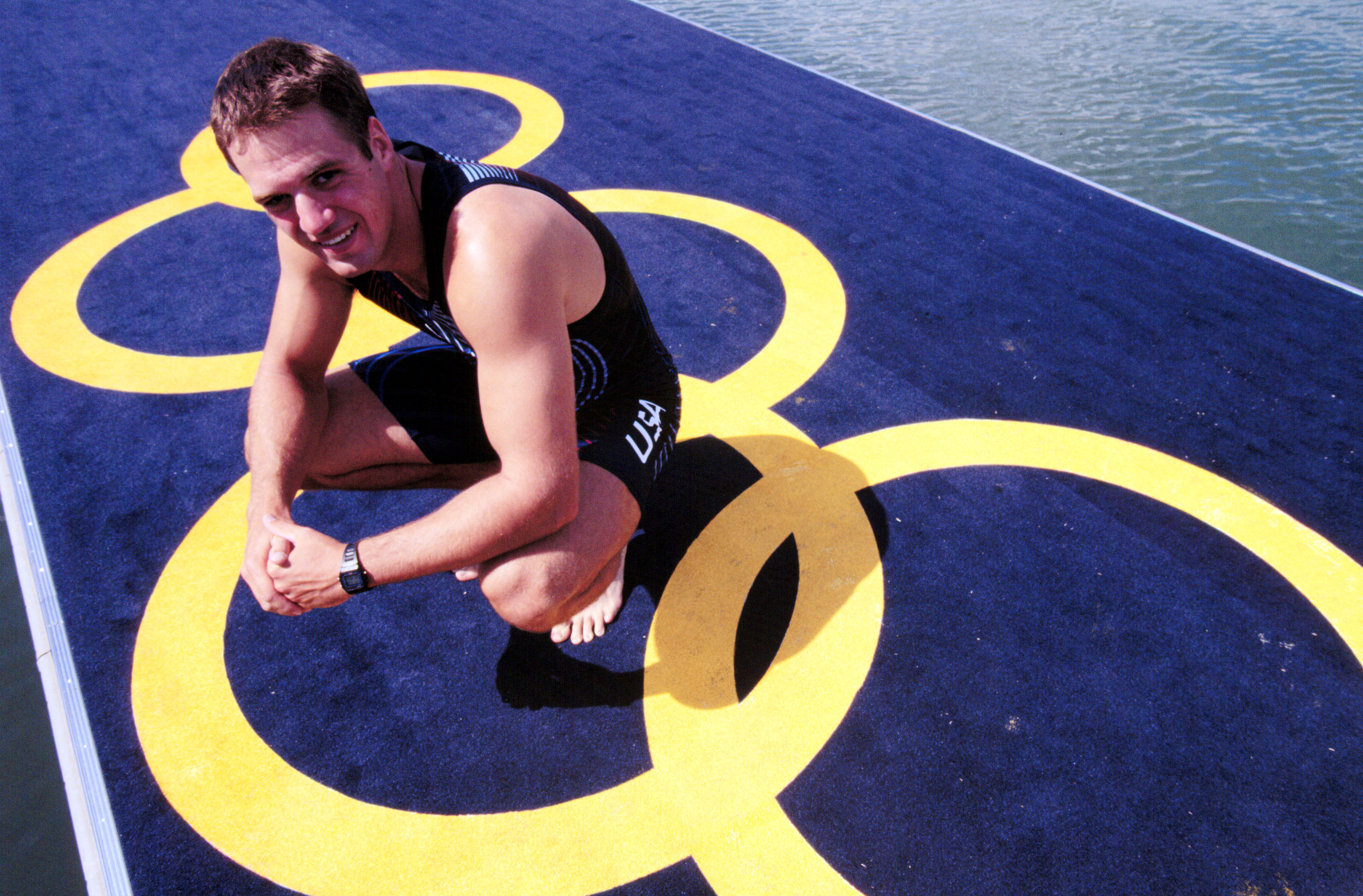

Personal information
- Born: March 4, 1977 (age 49) Chapel Hill, North Carolina, U.S.

Sport
- Country: United States
- Sport: Rowing

Henry Nuzum (born March 4, 1977) is an American rower. He competed at the 2004 Summer Olympics in Athens, where he placed 6th in the men's double sculls, along with Aquil Abdullah. He also competed at the 2000 Summer Olympics in Sydney, where he placed 8th in the men's double sculls, along with Mike Ferry. Nuzum was born in Chapel Hill, North Carolina. He graduated from Harvard University in 1999.
