= Matthew Trott =

Matthew Trott may refer to:

- Matthew Trott (footballer) (born 1985), Australian goalkeeper
- Matthew Trott (rower) (born 1980), New Zealand rower
