= Ákos Haller =

Hungarian rower

Medal record

Men's rowing

Representing Hungary

World Rowing Championships
Gold medal – first place	2001 Lucerne	M2x
Gold medal – first place	2002 Seville	M2x

Ákos Haller (born 8 December 1976 in Budapest) is a Hungarian rower. Together with Tibor Pető he finished 5th in the men's double sculls at the 2000 Summer Olympics.
