= Sebastian Mayer (rower) =

German rower

Medal record

Men's rowing

Representing Germany

World Rowing Championships
Silver medal – second place	1998 Cologne	M4x
Silver medal – second place	1999 St. Catharines	M2x

Sebastian Mayer (born 16 July 1973 in Regensburg) is a German rower. Together with Stefan Roehnert he finished 4th in the men's double sculls at the 2000 Summer Olympics.
