= Fredrik Bekken =

Norwegian rower (born 1975)

Personal information
- Born: 11 March 1975 (age 51) Drammen, Norway

Sport
- Sport: Rowing
- Club: Drammen RK
Medal record
Men's rowing
Olympic Games
| Silver medal – second place | 2000 Sydney | Double sculls |
World Rowing Championships
| Bronze medal – third place | 1999 St. Catharines | Double Sculls |

Fredrik Bekken (born 11 March 1975) is a Norwegian former representative rower, Olympic medalist, and coach for the Norwegian national rowing team.

== Career ==
Bekken was born in Drammen on 11 March 1975.

He won a silver medal in the double sculls at the 2000 Summer Olympics in Sydney, rowing with Olaf Tufte.

He won a bronze medal in the double sculls at the 1999 World Rowing Championships, also with Olaf Tufte.

In October 2024 he was assigned head coach for the Norwegian national rowing team.
