= Valent Sinković =

Croatian rower (born 1988)

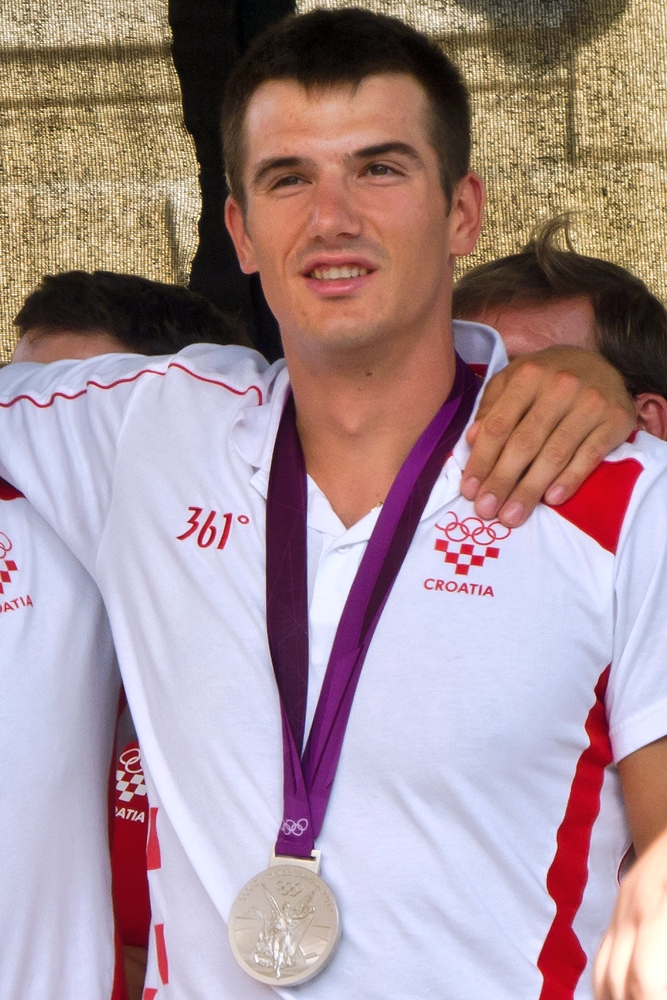
- Sinković in 2012

Personal information
- Nationality: Croatian
- Born: 2 August 1988 (age 38) Zagreb, SR Croatia, SFR Yugoslavia
- Height: 1.88 m (6 ft 2 in)
- Weight: 92 kg (203 lb)

Sport
- Country: Croatia
- Sport: Rowing
- Events: Coxless pair, Double sculls, Quadruple sculls
Medal record
Men's rowing
Representing Croatia
Olympic Games
Gold medal – first place	2016 Rio de Janeiro	Double sculls
Gold medal – first place	2020 Tokyo	Coxless pair
Gold medal – first place	2024 Paris	Coxless pair
Silver medal – second place	2012 London	Quadruple sculls
World Championships
Gold medal – first place	2010 Cambridge	Quadruple sculls
Gold medal – first place	2013 Chungjiu	Quadruple sculls
Gold medal – first place	2014 Amsterdam	Double sculls
Gold medal – first place	2015 Aiguebelette-le-Lac	Double sculls
Gold medal – first place	2018 Plovdiv	Coxless pair
Gold medal – first place	2019 Ottensheim	Coxless pair
Silver medal – second place	2017 Sarasota	Coxless pair
Silver medal – second place	2023 Belgrade	Double sculls
Bronze medal – third place	2011 Bled	Quadruple sculls
European Championships
Gold medal – first place	2012 Varese	Double sculls
Gold medal – first place	2016; Brandenburg an der Havel	Double sculls
Gold medal – first place	2018 Glasgow	Coxless pair
Gold medal – first place	2019 Lucerne	Coxless pair
Gold medal – first place	2021 Varese	Coxless pair
Gold medal – first place	2022 Oberschleißheim	Double sculls
Gold medal – first place	2023 Bled	Double sculls
Silver medal – second place	2010 Montemor-o-Velho	Quadruple sculls
Silver medal – second place	2020 Poznań	Coxless pair
Silver medal – second place	2025 Plovdiv	Coxless four
Bronze medal – third place	2026 Varese	Double sculls
World U23 Championships
Gold medal – first place	2009 Račice	Quadruple sculls
Gold medal – first place	2010 Brest	Quadruple sculls
Silver medal – second place	2008; Brandenburg an der Havel	Double sculls
World Junior Championships
Silver medal – second place	2006 Amsterdam	Double sculls

Valent Sinković (born 2 August 1988) is a Croatian rower. He is the older brother of fellow rower Martin Sinković, with whom he has won three Olympic gold medals. The brothers are the most decorated Croatian Summer Olympians in history and won the gold medal in the double sculls at the 2016 Summer Olympics, the coxless pair at the 2020 Summer Olympics and the coxless pair at the 2024 Summer Olympics, and the silver medal in the quadruple sculls at the 2012 Summer Olympics together with David Šain and Damir Martin. Sinković is a six-time world champion, twice in quadruple sculls, double sculls and coxless pair each, and seven-time European champion, with four titles in double sculls and three titles in coxless pair. He is also a two-time U23 world champion in quadruple sculls with his brother, Šain and Martin.

The Sinković brothers have been racing together internationally since 2008 and holds the world best time in double sculls, set at the 2014 World Rowing Championships where they were the first men's team to go under 6 minutes for their race time.

== Personal life ==
Sinković played multiple sports before transitioning fully to rowing. He first began practicing gymnastics at age three and was briefly a part of the youth setup of HAVK Mladost, a waterpolo club based in Zagreb. He also spent six years playing as a full-back in the youth setups of NK Zagreb, NK Hrvatski Dragovoljac and NK Lokomotiva football clubs. He began rowing at age 12, together with his brothers Martin and Matija, after their mother signed them up for rowing classes.

In 2017, Sinković married his partner Antonela, a lawyer.

== Rowing career ==
=== European championships ===
Valent first took part in the European championships in their fourth iteration, held in 2010, with his brothers Martin, as well as with David Šain and Damir Martin in the quadruple sculls category. After the 3/4 of the race was rowed, at 1500 meters, they held the fourth position. Over the course of the next 500 meters, they overtook the German and Ukrainian teams, finishing a second behind the Polish team.

They further took part in the 2012 European Rowing Championships as well, likewise competing in the quadruple sculls category. They held the leading position throughout the race, with 2.21 seconds ahead of the second placed team at 1500 meters, and went finished the race 0.92 seconds ahead of the second placed team. The winning time was 6:14.25. Valent was forced to miss part of the 2015 season with a rib injury and the brothers did not compete at the European championships.

Together with his brother, he competed in the double sculls category during the 2016 European Rowing Championships. They dominated the final race, holding the leading position from the start, with a 2-second lead after 500 meters, and finishing with a 3.68 second lead. Their winning time was 6:56.52.

In the 2018 European Rowing Championships, Valent competed with his brother Martin in the coxless pair category. They were second best for the first three quarters of the race, before taking over in the last 500 meters and finishing first, with a time of 6:26.42. The two brothers continued competing in the coxless pair in the 2019 European Rowing Championships as well, holding the leading position throughout the race, and finishing first with a time of 6:22.46. He and his brother competed in the coxless pair once again during the 2020 European Rowing Championships, finishing in the second place, behind the Romanian Tudosa/Cozmiuc pair.

=== Olympic games ===
Together with David Šain, Damir Martin and his brother, he participated in the 2012 Summer Olympics in London, in the quadruple sculls event. The team had no issue qualifying to the final race, coming into it as favorites. However, the German representatives would hold almost a boat lengths lead in the final race, with the Croatian team just barely winning the silver medal, as the Australians finished close behind.

He would change disciplines for the 2016 Summer Olympics in Rio, competing in the double sculls event together with his brother. In the final race of the event, the brothers held a narrow lead over the Lithuanian representatives, who overtook them by the 1500 meter mark. They would in turn overtake the Lithuanian team in the final 500 meters of the race, finishing the race first with a time of 6:50.28, 1.11 seconds ahead of the second placed team. Following this victory, the World Rowing Federation would award them the "Team of the Year" award.

Sinković competed in the 2020 Summer Olympics in Tokyo, entering the coxless pair event with his brother Valent. The pair entered the final race as overwhelming favorites to win the gold medal, with a betting coefficient of 1,03 and won with a time of 6:15.29. The Sinković brothers competed in the 2024 Summer Olympics in Paris in the coxless pair event. The pair trailed the other teams for a majority of the final race before overtaking the British leading team during the final 200 metres to win with a time of 6:23.66.

=== World championships ===
His first appearance in the world championships came at the 2010 World Rowing Championships, when he competed in the quadruple sculls. The Croatian team won the gold medal, finishing with a time of 6:15.78, 1.26 seconds ahead of the second placed team. In the 2011 World Rowing Championships, he won the sole bronze medal of his career, failing to defend his gold medal from the previous year. The same team competed in the 2013 World Rowing Championships, in the same category, finishing with a time of 5:53.57 and winning the gold medal.

During the 2014 World Rowing Championships, he switched to the double sculls, competing together with his brother. They broke the world record in the qualifying race, managing to cover the distance of 2 kilometers in under six minutes (5:59.72). In the final race, they finished first. They competed in the same category in the 2015 World Rowing Championships, once again winning the gold medal.

In the 2017 World Rowing Championships, he competed in the coxless pair for the first time in his career, once again with his brother. The pair finished in the second place, winning the silver medal. The two of them competed in the same category in the 2018 World Rowing Championships. They won the gold medal, finishing with a time of 6:14.96, 1.94 seconds ahead of the second placed team. They defended their gold medal at the 2019 World Rowing Championships, finishing with a time of 6:42.28.

Valent and his brother Martin Sinković competed in the double sculls event of the 2022 World Rowing Championships. They placed fourth in the A final, finishing five seconds behind the winning French crew. They stayed in the double scull for the 2023 World Championships in Belgrade and finished with a silver medal in the A final, earning a 2nd placing in the world rankings and qualifying that boat class for Croatia for the 2024 Paris Olympics.

== Competitions ==
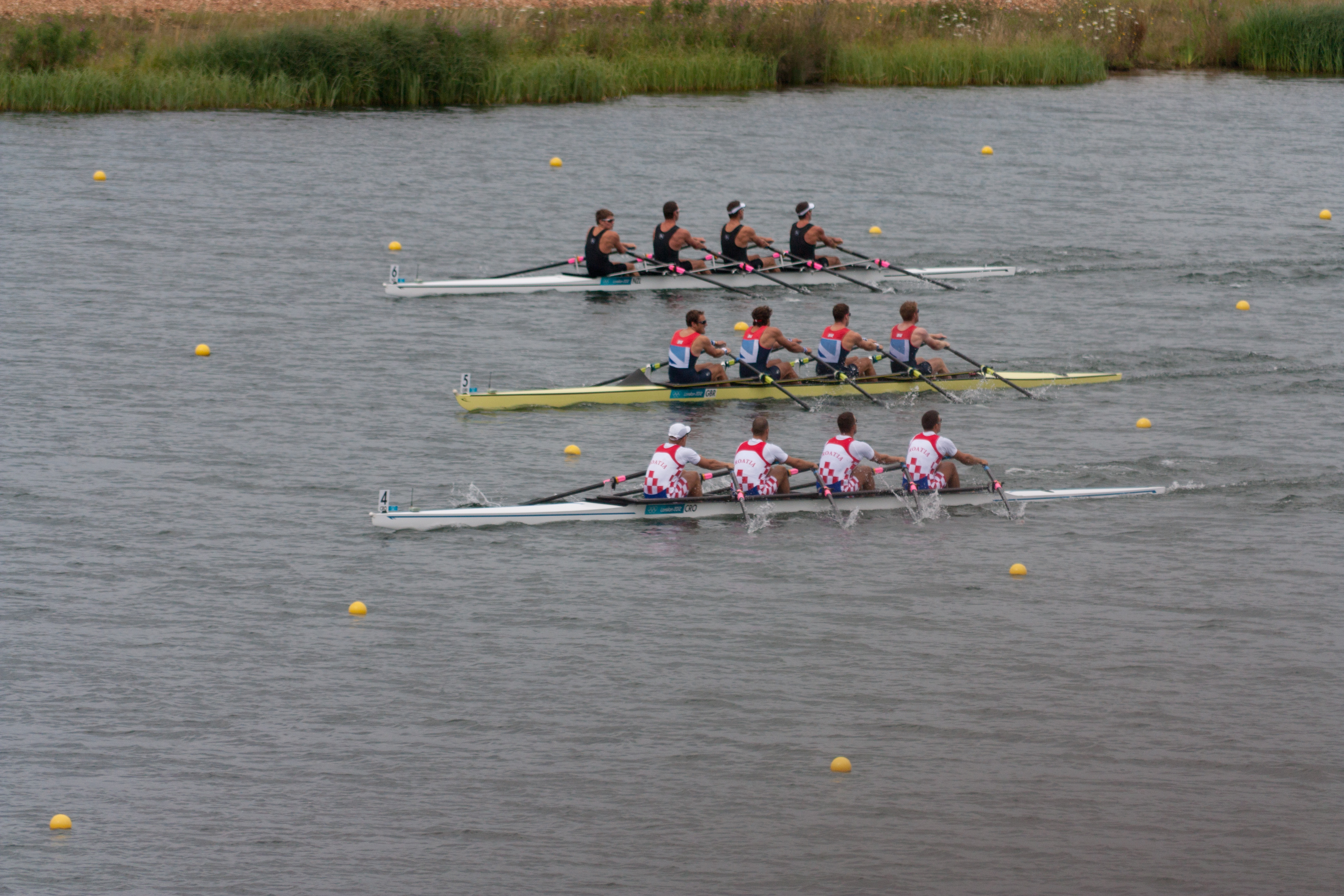
The Sinković brothers, David Šain and Damir Martin competing at the 2012 Summer Olympics

- 2016 Summer Olympics – Men's double sculls
- 2012 Summer Olympics – Men's quadruple sculls
- 2010 World Rowing Championships
- 2011 World Rowing Championships
- 2013 World Rowing Championships
- 2014 World Rowing Championships
- 2010 European Rowing Championships
- 2012 European Rowing Championships
