= Bo Kaliszan =

Danish rower

Personal information
- Nationality: Danish
- Born: 28 November 1973 (age 51); Copenhagen, Denmark

Sport
- Sport: Rowing

Bo Kaliszan (born 28 November 1973) is a Danish rower. He competed in the men's double sculls event at the 2000 Summer Olympics.
