= Michael Arms =

New Zealand rower

Personal information
- Born: 23 September 1989 (age 35); Auckland, New Zealand
- Height: 199 cm (6 ft 6 in)
- Weight: 95 kg (209 lb)

Michael Arms (born 23 September 1989 in Auckland) is a New Zealand rower. He finished 7th in the men's quadruple sculls at the 2012 Summer Olympics. He was part of the New Zealand men's eight that won the World Junior title at the 2006 World Junior Championships.
