= Damir Martin =

Croatian rower (born 1988)

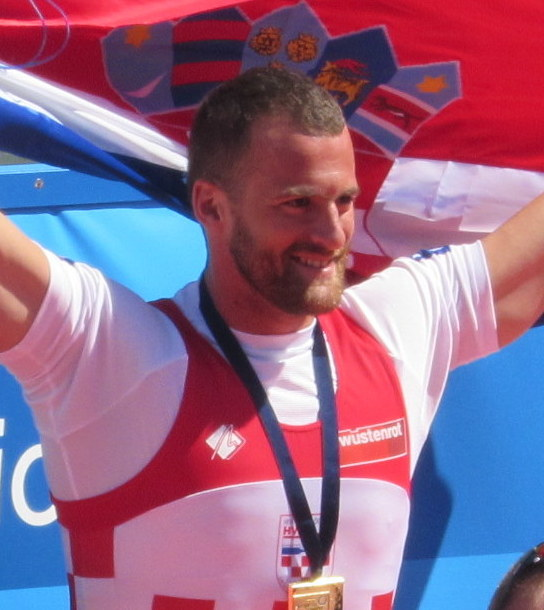
- Martin at the 2016 European Championships

Personal information
- Nationality: Croatian
- Born: 14 July 1988 (age 38) Vukovar, SR Croatia, SFR Yugoslavia
- Height: 1.89 m (6 ft 2 in)
- Weight: 97 kg (214 lb)

Sport
- Sport: Rowing
- Event: Single sculls
- Club: VK Croatia
Medal record
Men's rowing
Representing Croatia
Olympic Games
Silver medal – second place	2012 London	Quadruple sculls
Silver medal – second place	2016 Rio de Janeiro	Single sculls
Bronze medal – third place	2020 Tokyo	Single sculls
World Championships
Gold medal – first place	2010 Karapiro	Quadruple sculls
Gold medal – first place	2013 Chungjiu	Quadruple sculls
Bronze medal – third place	2011 Bled	Quadruple sculls
European Championships
Gold medal – first place	2015 Poznań	Single sculls
Gold medal – first place	2016 Brandenburg	Single sculls
Silver medal – second place	2010 Montemor-o-Velho	Quadruple sculls
Silver medal – second place	2012 Varese	Single sculls
Silver medal – second place	2017 Račice	Single sculls
Bronze medal – third place	2026 Varese	Quadruple sculls
World Rowing Cup
Gold medal – first place	2009 Munich	Quadruple sculls
Gold medal – first place	2010 Bled	Quadruple sculls
Gold medal – first place	2010 Munich	Quadruple sculls
Gold medal – first place	2010 Lucerne	Quadruple sculls
Gold medal – first place	2011 Hamburg	Quadruple sculls
Gold medal – first place	2012 Belgrade	Quadruple sculls
Gold medal – first place	2012 Lucerne	Quadruple sculls
Gold medal – first place	2012 Munich	Quadruple sculls
Gold medal – first place	2013 Eton	Quadruple sculls
Gold medal – first place	2013 Lucerne	Quadruple sculls
Gold medal – first place	2016 Varese	Single sculls
Gold medal – first place	2019 Plovdiv	Single sculls
Silver medal – second place	2011 Munich	Quadruple sculls
Silver medal – second place	2015 Varese	Single sculls
Silver medal – second place	2016 Poznań	Single sculls
Silver medal – second place	2017 Belgrade	Single sculls
Silver medal – second place	2024 Poznań	Single sculls
Bronze medal – third place	2019 Rotterdam	Single sculls
Bronze medal – third place	2021 Zagreb	Single sculls
Bronze medal – third place	2021 Sabaudia	Single sculls
World U23 Championships
Gold medal – first place	2009 Račice	Quadruple sculls
Gold medal – first place	2010 Brest	Quadruple sculls
World Junior Championships
Silver medal – second place	2006 Amsterdam	Double sculls

Damir Martin (born 14 July 1988) is a Croatian rower. He is a three-time Olympic medallist and won silver medals at the 2012 and 2016 Olympic Games, and a bronze medal at the 2020 Olympics. Martin is also a two-time world champion (2010, 2013), a two-time European champion (2015, 2016), and a twelve-time World Rowing Cup champion. He won the gold medal at the World U23 Championships in 2009 and 2010. Martin is currently a member of rowing club VK Croatia, and has previously been a member of clubs Zagreb and Trešnjevka.

== Early life ==
Martin was born in the city of Vukovar. He comes from a family of rowers, with his parents and grandfather being rowers, in addition to rowing being a traditional sport in Vukovar. At the age of three, Martin was forced to leave his hometown with his mother Dubravka and older brother Stanislav due to the Siege of Vukovar, while his father Boris stayed and fought. The family were reunited in Zagreb before moving to Austria for six months and eventually settling in Germany for four years. In 1995, the family returned to Zagreb. Martin was a swimmer for four years, before he began rowing at the age of 12. He joined the Croatian national rowing team at the age of 17.

== Rowing career ==
Martin won his first European Championships medal when he placed second in the men's quadruple sculls event with David Šain and brothers Martin and Valent Sinković at the 2010 European Championships. The quartet won their first World Championship title at the 2010 World Championships in Montemor-o-Velho. They placed third at the 2011 World Championships in Bled. The quartet won the silver medal at the 2012 Summer Olympics in the men's quadruple sculls event. Martin competed in the single sculls event at the 2012 European Championships in Varese where he finished second. Together with Šain and the Sinković brothers, Martin won a second World Championship title at the 2013 World Championships in Chungju.

After switching to single sculls, Martin won his first European Championship title at the 2015 Championships in Poznań and retained his title the following year at the 2016 European Championships in Brandenburg. Martin won the silver medal at the 2016 Summer Olympics in the men's single sculls event, losing to Mahé Drysdale in a photo finish and beating multiple-time world champion Ondřej Synek. In 2017, he placed second at the European Championships in Račice. At the 2020 Summer Olympics, held in 2021 due to the COVID-19 pandemic, Martin won the bronze medal in the men's single sculls event. He competed at the 2024 Summer Olympics in Paris and placed eleventh in the men's single sculls event.
