= Tihomir Jarnjević =

Croatian rower

Personal information
- Nationality: Croatian
- Born: 2 March 1978 (age 47); Karlovac, Croatia

Sport
- Sport: Rowing

Tihomir Jarnjević (born 2 March 1978) is a Croatian rower. He competed in the men's double sculls event at the 2000 Summer Olympics.
