= Valentina Calabrese =

Italian female rower

Personal information
- National team: Italy
- Born: 23 April 1990 (age 36) Tradate, Italy
- Height: 1.77 m (5 ft 10 in)
- Weight: 64 kg (141 lb)

Sport
- Sport: Rowing
- Club: Canottieri Gavirate
- Start activity: 2001
- Coached by: Giovanni Calabrese
Medal record
Event	1st	2nd	3rd
European Championships	0	1	0

Valentina Calabrese (born 23 April 1990) is an Italian female rower, medal winner at senior level at the European Rowing Championships.

She is the daughter of the Italian Olympic medal, the Messinese Giovanni Calabrese who is also her coach and Paola Grizzetti 6th in rowing at Los Angeles 1984.
