= Stefan Roehnert =

German rower (born 1977)

Medal record

Men's rowing

Representing Germany

World Rowing Championships
Silver medal – second place	1998 Cologne	M4x
Silver medal – second place	1999 St. Catharines	M2x

Stefan Roehnert (born 19 October 1977 in Koblenz) is a German rower. Together with Sebastian Mayer he finished 4th in the men's double sculls at the 2000 Summer Olympics.
