= Kostyantyn Pronenko =

Ukrainian rower

Personal information
- Nationality: Ukrainian
- Born: 26 November 1971 (age 54) Dnipropetrovsk, Ukrainian SSR, Soviet Union

Sport
- Sport: Rowing
Medal record
Men's rowing
Representing Ukraine
Summer Universiade
Gold medal – first place	1993 Buffalo	Quadruple sculls

Kostyantyn Pronenko (born 26 November 1971) is a Ukrainian rower. He competed in the men's double sculls event at the 2000 Summer Olympics.
