= Peter Graves (rower) =

American rower

Personal information
- Nationality: American
- Born: October 25, 1984 (age 42) Cincinnati, Ohio, United States

Sport
- Sport: Rowing

Peter Graves (born October 25, 1984) is an American rower. He competed in the men's quadruple sculls event at the 2012 Summer Olympics.
