= Giovanni Calabrese =

Italian rower (born 1966)

Personal information
- Born: 30 October 1966 (age 59) Messina, Italy
- Spouse: Paola Grizzetti

Sport
- Sport: Rowing
Medal record
Representing Italy
Men's rowing
Olympic Games
Bronze medal – third place	2000 Sydney	Double scull
World Championships
Gold medal – first place	1987 Copenhagen	Lwt double scull
Gold medal – first place	1997 Aiguebelette	Quad scull
Silver medal – second place	1989 Bled	Quad scull
Mediterranean Games
Gold medal – first place	1993 Languedoc	Single sculls
Bronze medal – third place	1991 Athens	Double sculls
Bronze medal – third place	1997 Bari	Single sculls
Summer Universiade
Gold medal – first place	1987 Zagreb	Lwt double sculls

Giovanni Calabrese (born 30 October 1966 in Messina) is an Italian rower who competed at three Olympic Games.

He is married to Paola Grizzetti, 6th in rowing at Los Angeles 1984, and his daughter Valentina is also a rower, silver medal at senior level at the 2010 European Rowing Championships, he is her coach.

== Biography ==
Calabrese was twice world rowing champion; in 1987, he won in the lightweight double scull in Copenhagen, and ten years later in 1997, he won with the quad scull in Aiguebelette. He won a bronze medal in the double sculls event at the 2000 Summer Olympics, together with teammate Nicola Sartori.
