= Ivan Jukić (rower) =

Croatian rower

Personal information
- Nationality: Croatian
- Born: 27 December 1977 (age 47); Vukovar, SR Croatia, SFR Yugoslavia

Sport
- Sport: Rowing

Ivan Jukić (born 27 December 1977) is a Croatian rower. He competed in the men's double sculls event at the 2000 Summer Olympics placing 14th.
