= Benjamin Chabanet =

French rower

Personal information
- Nationality: French
- Born: 4 November 1988 (age 37) Vichy, France

Sport
- Sport: Rowing

Benjamin Chabanet (born 4 November 1988) is a French rower. He competed in the men's quadruple sculls event at the 2012 Summer Olympics.
