= Alexander Osborne =

American rower (born 1987)

Personal information
- Born: May 4, 1987 (age 37); Los Angeles, California, United States

Sport
- Sport: Rowing

Alexander Osborne (born May 4, 1987) is an American rower. He competed in the men's quadruple sculls event at the 2012 Summer Olympics in London.
