= Tibor Pető =

Hungarian rower

Medal record

Men's rowing

Representing Hungary

World Rowing Championships
Gold medal – first place	2001 Lucerne	Double sculls
Gold medal – first place	2002 Seville	Double sculls

Tibor Pető (born 27 December 1980 in Vác) is a Hungarian rower. Together with Ákos Haller he finished 5th in the men's double sculls at the 2000 Summer Olympics.
