= Bertil Samuelson =

Danish rower

Personal information
- Nationality: Danish
- Born: 21 December 1974 (age 50); Gentofte, Denmark

Sport
- Sport: Rowing

Bertil Samuelson (born 21 December 1974) is a Danish rower. He competed in the men's double sculls event at the 2000 Summer Olympics.
