= David Šain =

Croatian rower (born 1988)

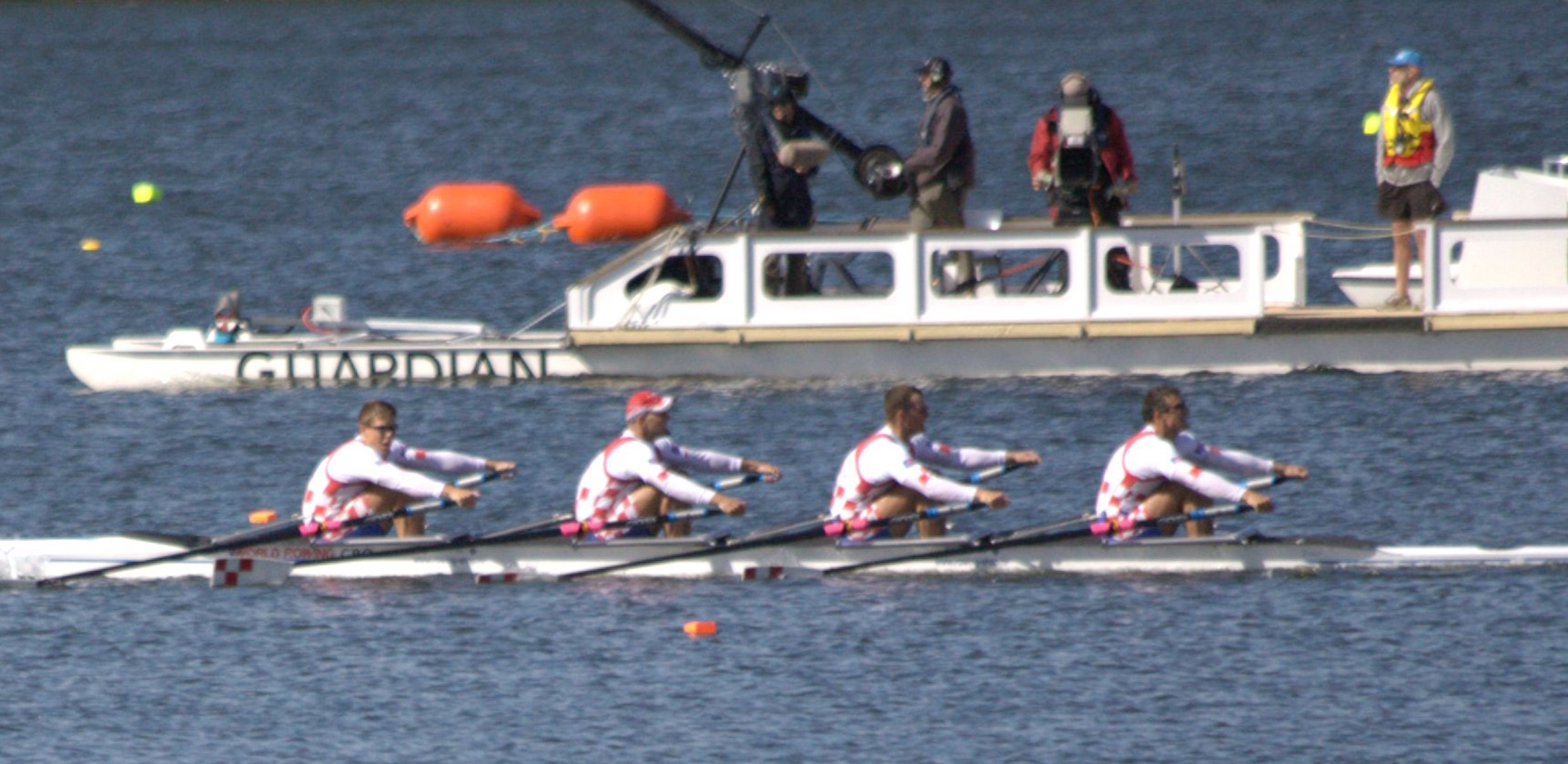
- Šain (far left) at the 2010 World Championships with Martin Sinković, Damir Martin and Valent Sinković

Personal information
- Nationality: Croatian
- Born: 8 February 1988 (age 38) Osijek, Croatia
- Height: 185 cm (6 ft 1 in)
- Weight: 91 kg (201 lb)

Sport
- Sport: Rowing
- Event: Quadruple sculls
Medal record
Men's rowing
Representing Croatia
Olympic Games
Silver medal – second place	2012 London	M4x
World Championships
Gold medal – first place	2010 Karapiro	M4x
Gold medal – first place	2013 Chungjiu	M4x
Bronze medal – third place	2011 Bled	M4x
European Championships
Silver medal – second place	2010 Montemor-o-Velho	M4x
World Rowing Cup
Gold medal – first place	2009 Munich	M4x
Gold medal – first place	2010 Bled	M4x
Gold medal – first place	2010 Munich	M4x
Gold medal – first place	2010 Lucerne	M4x
Gold medal – first place	2011 Hamburg	M4x
Gold medal – first place	2012 Belgrade	M4x
Gold medal – first place	2012 Lucerne	M4x
Gold medal – first place	2012 Munich	M4x
Gold medal – first place	2013 Eton	M4x
Gold medal – first place	2013 Lucerne	M4x
Silver medal – second place	2011 Munich	M4x
World U23 Championships
Gold medal – first place	2009 Račice	M4x
Gold medal – first place	2010 Brest	M4x
World Junior Championships
Silver medal – second place	2006 Amsterdam	M4x

David Šain (born 8 February 1988 in Osijek) is a Croatian rower. He is an Olympic medalist and won silver at the 2012 Summer Olympics in the men's quadruple sculls event, with Martin Sinković, Damir Martin and Valent Sinković.

Šain is also a two-time world champion (2010, 2013), a World Championships bronze medalist (2011) and a European Championships silver medalist (2010) in quadruple sculls. Together with Martin and the Sinković brothers, he won the gold medal at the 2009 and 2010 World U23 Championships.

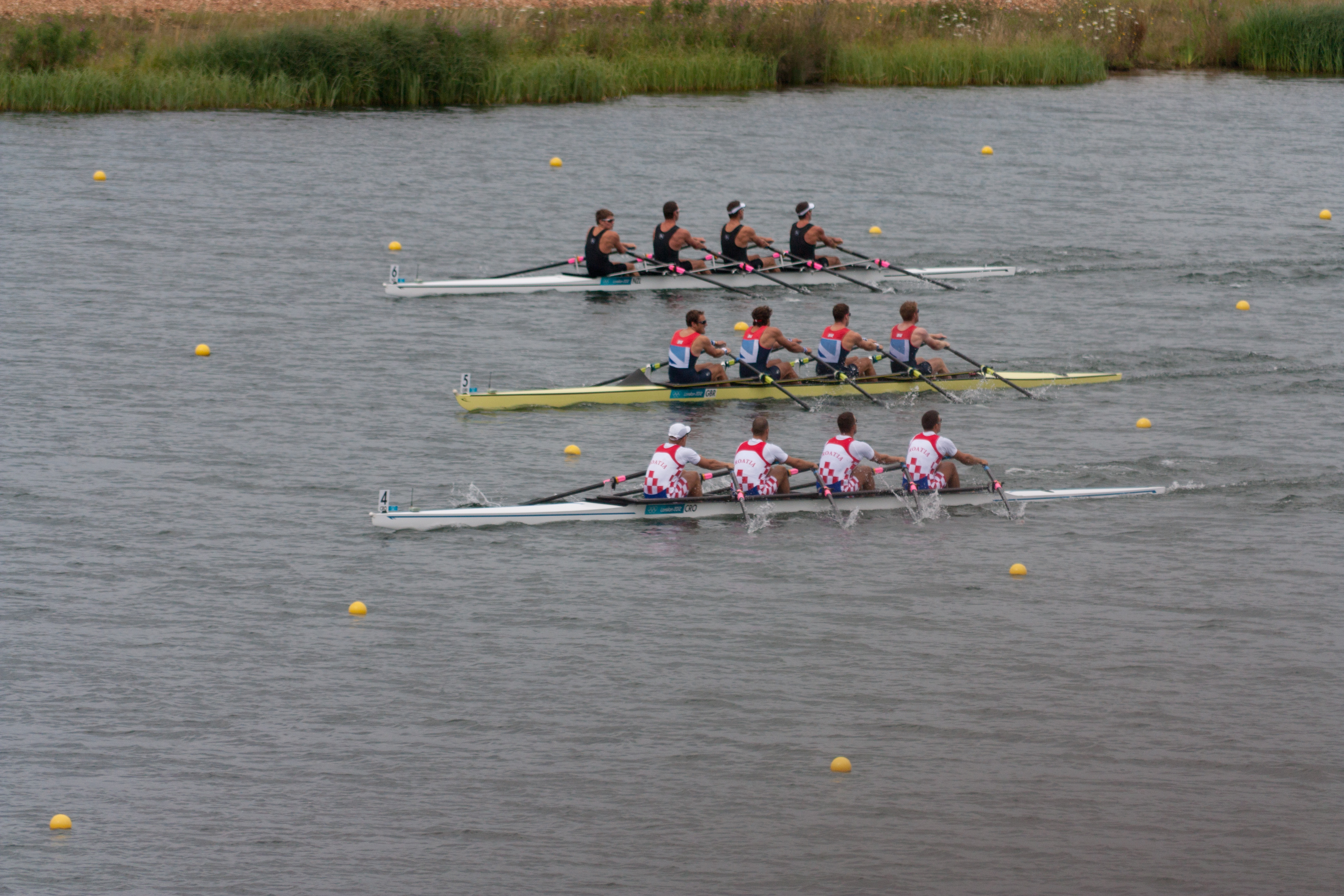
Šain (far left), Martin and the Sinković brothers competing at the 2012 Summer Olympics
