= Paola Grizzetti =

Italian rower

Personal information
- Nationality: Italian
- Born: 25 October 1965 (age 59)
- Spouse: Giovanni Calabrese

Sport
- Sport: Rowing

Paola Grizzetti (born 25 October 1965) is an Italian rower. She competed in the women's quadruple sculls event at the 1984 Summer Olympics.

She is married to rower Giovanni Calabrese, and her daughter, Valentina, is also a rower.
