= Mauricio Monteserín =

Spanish rower

Personal information
- Nationality: Spanish
- Born: 23 March 1976 (age 49); Oviedo, Spain

Sport
- Sport: Rowing

Mauricio Monteserín (born 23 March 1976) is a Spanish rower. He competed in the men's double sculls event at the 2000 Summer Olympics.
