= Mike Ferry =

American rower

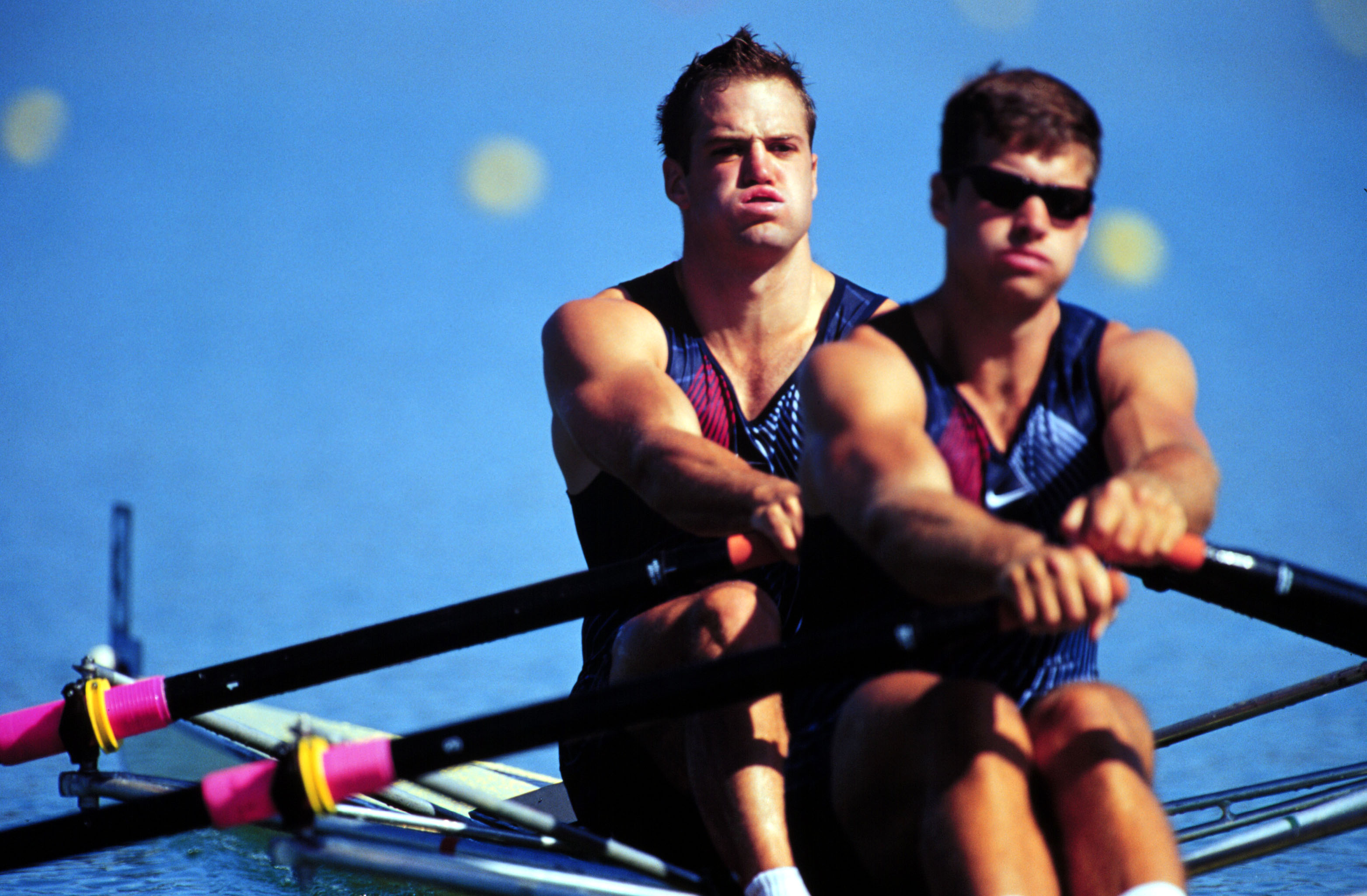
- Mike Ferry (Right) at 2000 Olympic Games

Personal information
- Nationality: American
- Born: April 13, 1974 (age 52) Princeton, New Jersey, United States

Sport
- Sport: Rowing

Mike Ferry (born April 13, 1974) is an American rower. He competed in the men's double sculls event at the 2000 Summer Olympics.
