= Nicola Sartori =

Italian rower

Personal information
- Born: 17 July 1976 (age 49) Cremona, Italy

Sport
- Sport: Rowing
- Club: Fiamme Oro
Medal record
Bronze medal – third place	2000 Sydney	Double sculls

Nicola Sartori (born 17 July 1976) is an Italian rower who won a bronze medal in the double sculls event at the 2000 Summer Olympics, together with teammate Giovanni Calabrese.
