= Guillermo Mediano =

Spanish swimmer

Personal information
- Born: 3 February 1976 (age 50)

Sport
- Sport: Swimming

Guillermo Mediano (born 3 February 1976) is a Spanish former backstroke swimmer who competed in the 2000 Summer Olympics.
