= Pierpaolo Frattini =

Italian rower

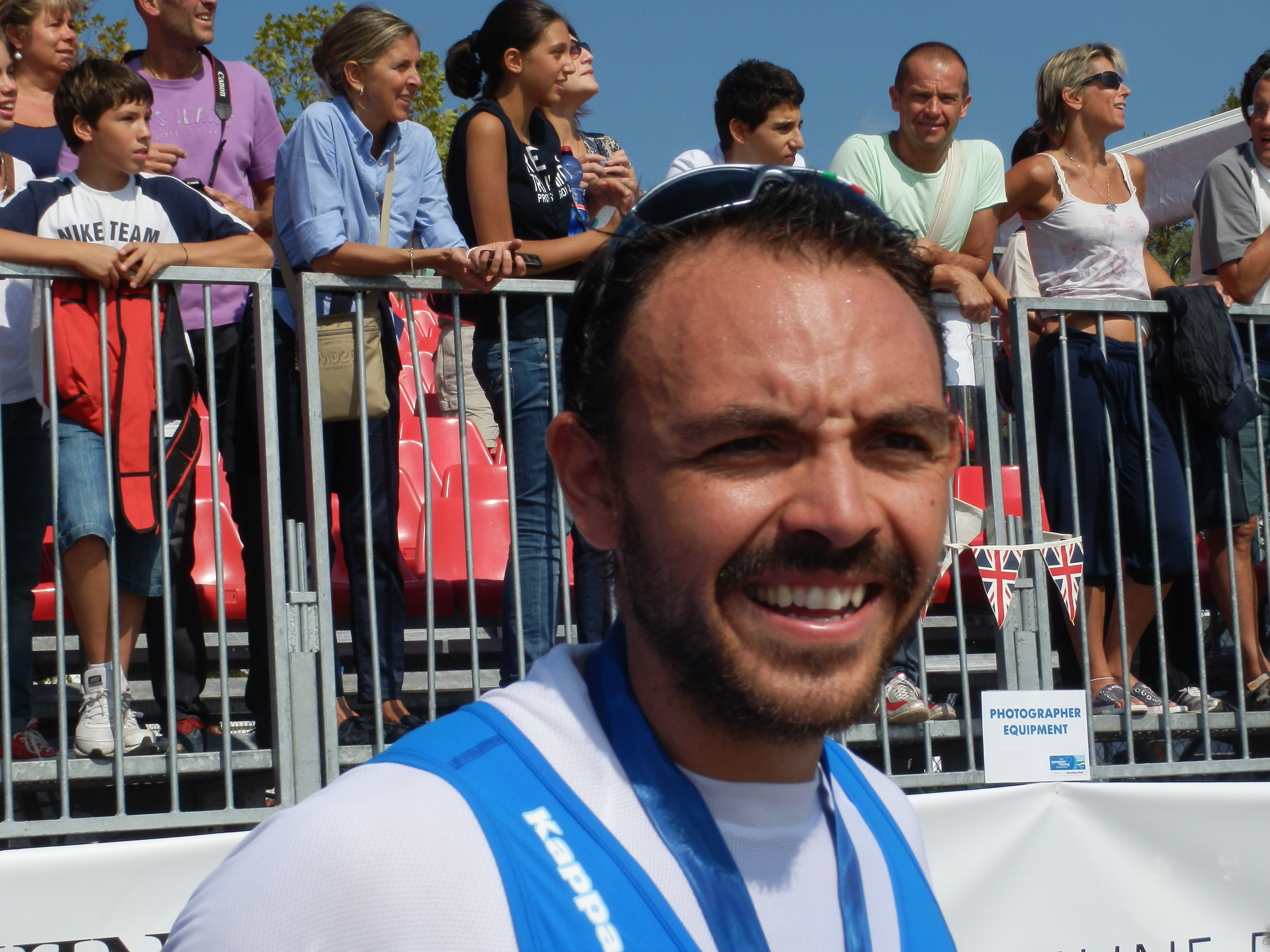
- Pierpaolo Frattini in 2012

Personal information
- Born: 23 February 1984 (age 42)

Sport
- Sport: Rowing

Pierpaolo Frattini (born 23 February 1984) is an Italian rower. He competed in the men's eight event at the 2016 Summer Olympics.
