= Yosbel Martínez =

Cuban rower (born 1976)

Personal information
- Born: 18 August 1976 (age 49) Pinar del Río, Cuba

Sport
- Sport: Rowing
Medal record
Representing Cuba
Pan American Games
Gold medal – first place	2003 Santo Domingo	Double sculls
Gold medal – first place	2003 Santo Domingo	Quadruple sculls
Bronze medal – third place	2003 Santo Domingo	Eights
Central American and Caribbean Games
Gold medal – first place	1998 Maracaibo	Coxless fours

Yosbel Martínez Hechevarría (born 18 August 1976) is a Cuban rower. He competed at the 2000 Summer Olympics and the 2004 Summer Olympics.
