= Kostyantyn Zaytsev =

Ukrainian rower

Personal information
- Nationality: Ukrainian
- Born: 20 May 1976 (age 50) Dnipropetrovsk, Ukrainian SSR, Soviet Union

Sport
- Sport: Rowing
Medal record
Men's rowing
Representing Ukraine
European Championships
Bronze medal – third place	2008 Marathon	M1x

Kostyantyn Zaytsev (born 20 May 1976) is a Ukrainian rower. He competed at the 2000 Summer Olympics and the 2012 Summer Olympics.
