= Matthew Trott (rower) =

New Zealand rower

Personal information
- Nationality: New Zealand
- Born: 26 April 1980 (age 46) Ashburton, New Zealand
- Height: 190 cm (6 ft 3 in)
- Weight: 90 kg (198 lb)

Matthew Trott (born 26 April 1980) is a New Zealand rower.

Trott was born in 1980 in Ashburton, New Zealand. He started rowing at age 15 and was a member of Canterbury Rowing Club. He represented New Zealand at the 2012 Summer Olympics. He is listed as New Zealand Olympian athlete number 1220 by the New Zealand Olympic Committee. After seven years with New Zealand's elite squad, he retired at the end of 2012 and became a rural banker.
