= Jaime Ríos (rower) =

Spanish rower

Personal information
- Nationality: Spanish
- Born: 31 October 1977 (age 47); Avilés, Spain

Sport
- Sport: Rowing

Jaime Ríos (born 31 October 1977) is a Spanish rower. He competed in the men's double sculls event at the 2000 Summer Olympics.
