= Karl Schulze =

German rower

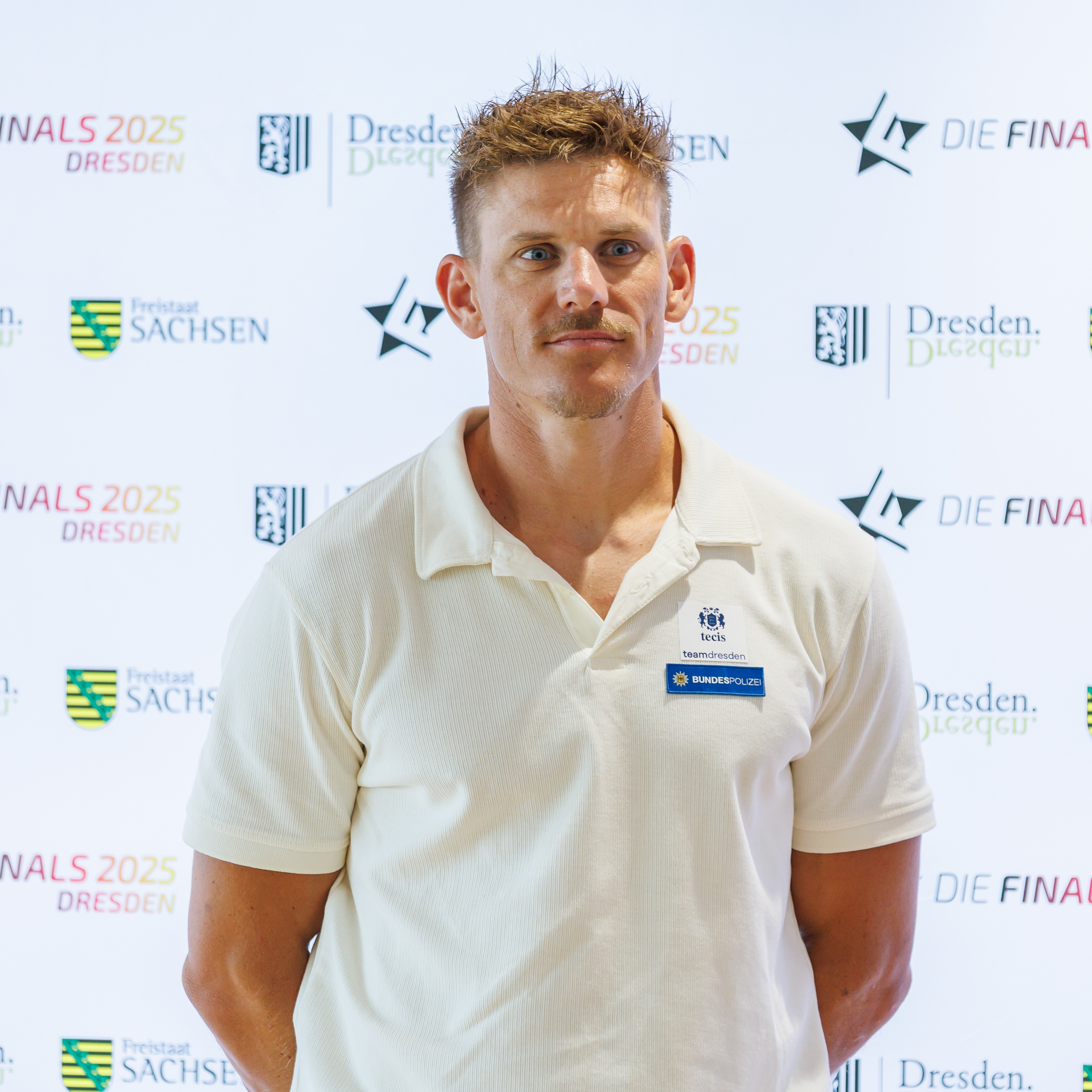
- Schulze in 2025

Personal information
- Born: 5 March 1988 (age 38) Dresden, East Germany
Medal record
Men's rowing
Representing Germany
Olympic Games
Gold medal – first place	2012 London	M4x
Gold medal – first place	2016 Rio de Janeiro	M4x
World Championships
Gold medal – first place	2015 Aiguebelette	M4x
Silver medal – second place	2011 Bled	M4x
Silver medal – second place	2013 Chungjiu	M4x
Bronze medal – third place	2014 Amsterdam	M4x
European Championships
Bronze medal – third place	2014 Belgrade	M4x

Karl Schulze (born 5 March 1988) is a German rower. He was part of the German crew that won the gold medal in the men's quadruple sculls at the 2012 Summer Olympics in London. He won again in the men's quadruple sculls at the 2016 Rio Olympics as part of the German team.
