= Philipp Wende =

German rower

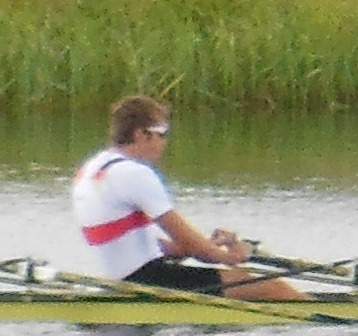
- Rowing at the 2012 Summer Olympics – Men's quadruple sculls,

Personal information
- Born: 4 July 1985 (age 40) Wurzen, East Germany
- Height: 199 cm (6 ft 6 in)
- Weight: 89 kg (196 lb)
Medal record
Men's rowing
Representing Germany
Olympic Games
Gold medal – first place	2012 London	M4x
Gold medal – first place	2016 Rio de Janeiro	M4x
World Championships
Gold medal – first place	2015 Aiguebelette	M4x
Silver medal – second place	2011 Bled	M4x
Bronze medal – third place	2014 Amsterdam	M4x
European Championships
Bronze medal – third place	2014 Belgrade	M4x

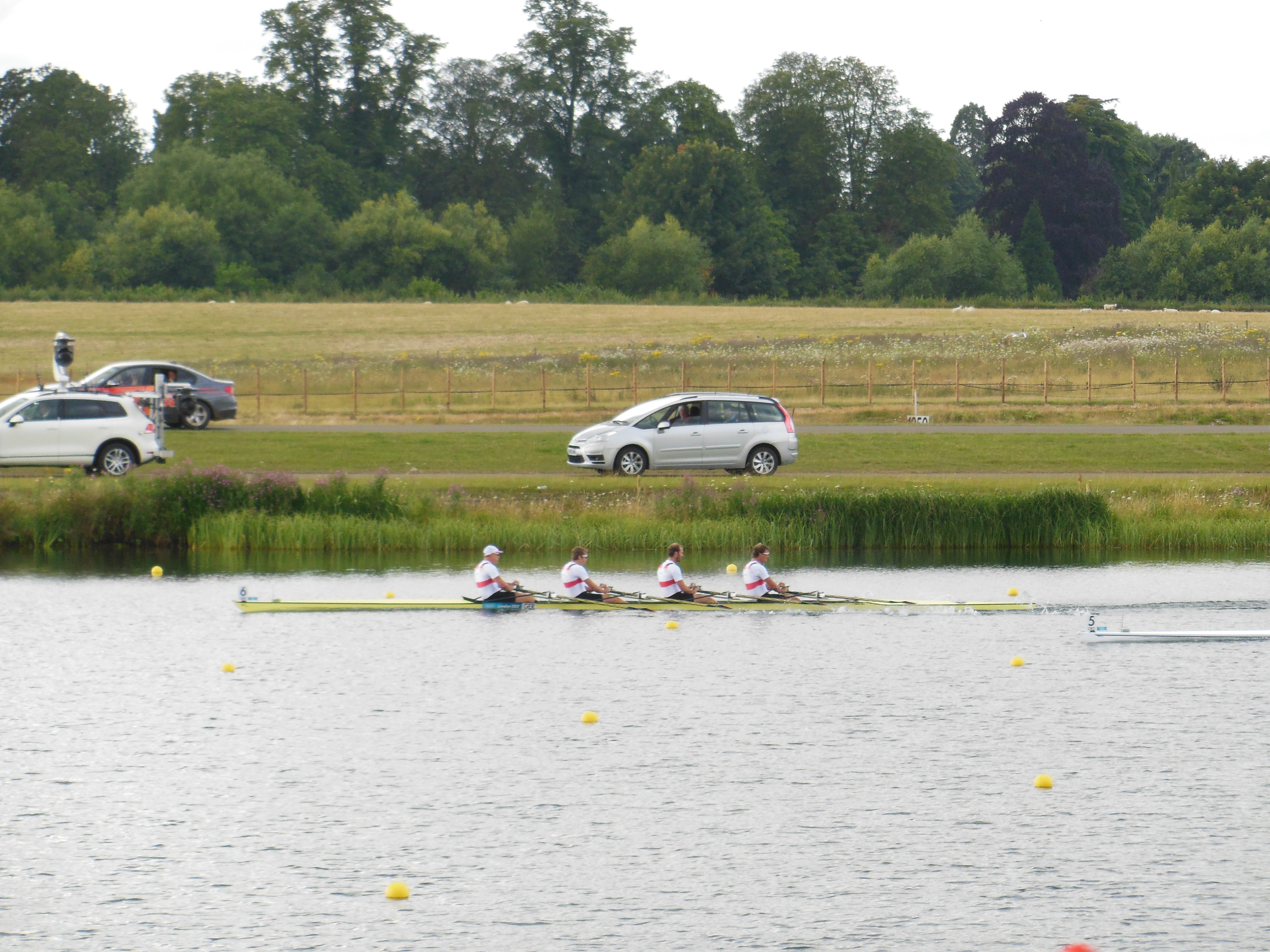
Rowing the quadruple sculls final at the 2012 Summer Olympics

Philipp Wende (born 4 July 1985, in Wurzen) is a German rower. He was part of the German crew that won the gold medal in the men's quadruple sculls at the 2012 Summer Olympics in London. He also successfully defended the quadruple sculls title at the 2016 Rio Olympics as part of the German team.
