= Rowing at the 2008 Summer Olympics – Men's quadruple sculls =

Men's quadruple sculls at the Games of the XXIX Olympiad

Medalists
1st place, gold medalist(s)		Konrad Wasielewski; Marek Kolbowicz; Michał Jeliński; Adam Korol	Poland
2nd place, silver medalist(s)		Luca Agamennoni; Simone Venier; Rossano Galtarossa; Simone Raineri	Italy
3rd place, bronze medalist(s)		Jonathan Coeffic; Pierre-Jean Peltier; Julien Bahain; Cédric Berrest	France

Men's quadruple sculls competition at the 2008 Summer Olympics in Beijing was held from August 10 to 17, at the Shunyi Olympic Rowing-Canoeing Park.

This rowing event is a quadruple scull event, meaning that each boat is propelled by four rowers. The "scull" portion means that each rower uses two oars, one on each side of the boat; this contrasts with sweep rowing in which each rower has one oar and rows on only one side.

The competition consisted of multiple rounds. Finals were held to determine the placing of each boat; these finals were given letters with those nearer to the beginning of the alphabet meaning a better ranking. Semifinals were named based on which finals they fed, with each semifinal having two possible finals.

During the first round three heats were held. The top three boats in each heat advanced to the A/B semifinals, with all others going to the repechage. In the repechage, four boats raced for three spots in the A/B semifinals, with the top three advancing and the fourth place boat getting an overall rank of 13th of 13 boats competing in the event.

Only A/B semifinals were held. For each of the two semifinal races, the top three boats moved on to the better of the two finals (the A final), while the bottom three boats went to the lesser of the two finals (the B final).

The third and final round was the Finals. Each final determined a set of rankings. The A final determined the medals, along with the rest of the places through 6th. The B final gave rankings from 7th to 12th.

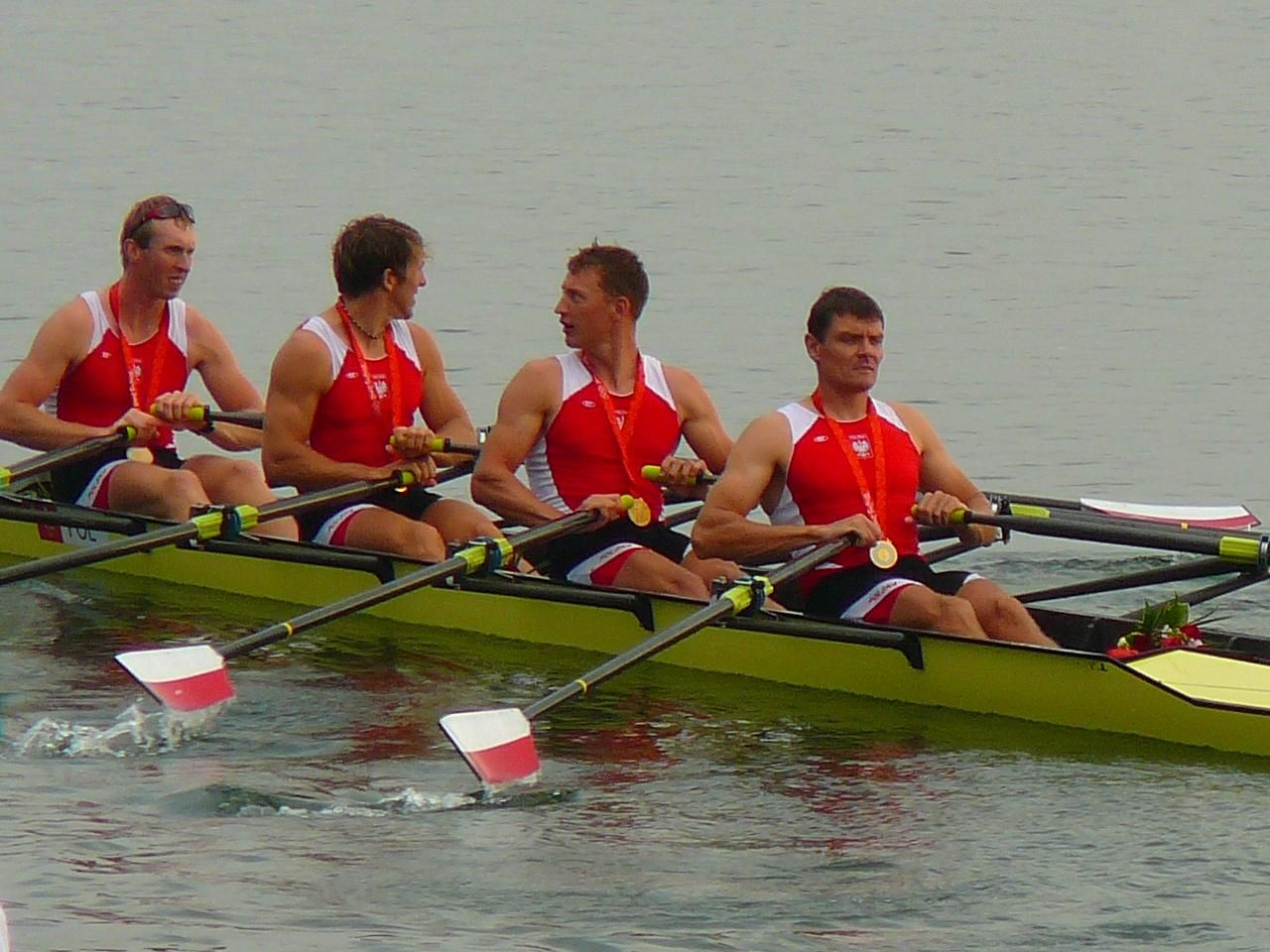
Polish men's quadruple sculls: gold medalists

== Schedule ==
All times are China Standard Time (UTC+8)

Date	Time	Round
Sunday, August 10, 2008	16:50-17:20	Heats
Tuesday, August 12, 2008	17:00-17:10	Repechage
Friday, August 15, 2008	16:30-16:50	Semifinals A/B
Saturday, August 16, 2008	15:10-15:20	Final B
Sunday, August 17, 2008	16:50-17:00	Final A

== Results ==
=== Heats ===
Qualification Rules: 1-3->SA/B, 4..->R

==== Heat 1 ====
Rank	Rowers	Country	Time	Notes
1	Morgan, McRae, Long, Noonan	Australia	5:36.20 (WB)	SA/B
2	Agamennoni, Venier, Galtarossa, Raineri	Italy	5:36.42	SA/B
3	Morgachyov, Fedorovtsev, Salov, Spinyov	Russia	5:39.18	SA/B
4	Taimsoo, Latin, Kuzmin, Raja	Estonia	5:42.22	R
5	Vitasek, Dolecek, Hanak, Jirka	Czech Republic	6:00.98	R

==== Heat 2 ====
Rank	Rowers	Country	Time	Notes
1	Wasielewski, Kolbowicz, Jelinski, Korol	Poland	5:38.76	SA/B
2	Coeffic, Peltier, Bahain, Berrest	France	5:41.75	SA/B
3	Lemiashkevich, Novikau, Shurmei, Radzevich	Belarus	5:43.73	SA/B
4	Cascaret, Concepción, Fournier, Hernández	Cuba	5:44.68	R

==== Heat 3 ====
Rank	Rowers	Country	Time	Notes
1	Hryn, Pavlovskiy, Lykov, Biloushchenko	Ukraine	5:40.11	SA/B
2	Krüger, Bertram, Gruhne, Schreiber	Germany	5:43.48	SA/B
3	Hughes, Stitt, Schroeder, Gault	United States	5:45.77	SA/B
4	Zupanc, Jer. Jurse, Jan. Jurse, Fistravec	Slovenia	5:57.02	R

=== Repechage ===
Qualification Rules: 1-3->SA/B

Rank	Rowers	Country	Time	Notes
1	Taimsoo, Latin, Kuzmin, Raja	Estonia	6:01.46	SA/B
2	Cascaret, Concepción, Fournier, Hernández	Cuba	6:03.56	SA/B
3	Vitasek, Dolecek, Hanak, Jirka	Czech Republic	6:04.95	SA/B
4	Zupanc, Jer. Jurse, Jan. Jurse, Fistravec	Slovenia	6:12.64	

=== Semifinals A/B ===
Qualification Rules: 1-3->FA, 4..->FB

==== Semifinal A/B 1 ====
Rank	Rowers	Country	Time	Notes
1	Wasielewski, Kolbowicz, Jelinski, Korol	Poland	5:51.29	FA
2	Morgan, McRae, Long, Noonan	Australia	5:52.93	FA
3	Krüger, Bertram, Gruhne, Schreiber	Germany	5:53.56	FA
4	Vitasek, Dolecek, Hanak, Jirka	Czech Republic	5:56.38	FB
5	Morgachyov, Fedorovtsev, Salov, Spinyov	Russia	5:59.56	FB
6	Lemiashkevich, Novikau, Shurmei, Radzevich	Belarus	6:06.80	FB

==== Semifinal A/B 2 ====
Rank	Rowers	Country	Time	Notes
1	Agamennoni, Venier, Galtarossa, Raineri	Italy	5:51.20	FA
2	Hughes, Stitt, Schroeder, Gault	United States	5:52.81	FA
3	Coeffic, Peltier, Bahain, Berrest	France	5:53.04	FA
4	Taimsoo, Latin, Kuzmin, Raja	Estonia	5:54.57	FB
5	Gryn, Pavlovskiy, Lykov, Biloushchenko	Ukraine	6:03.71	FB
6	Cascaret, Concepción, Fournier, Hernández	Cuba	6:04.99	FB

=== Final B ===
Rank	Rowers	Country	Time	Notes
1	Morgachyov, Fedorovtsev, Salov, Spinyov	Russia	5:46.17	
2	Hryn, Pavlovskiy, Lykov, Biloushchenko	Ukraine	5:47.89	
3	Taimsoo, Latin, Kuzmin, Raja	Estonia	5:48.12	
4	Vitasek, Dolecek, Hanak, Jirka	Czech Republic	5:50.07	
5	Lemiashkevich, Novikau, Shurmei, Radzevich	Belarus	5:50.74	
6	Cascaret, Concepción, Fournier, Hernández	Cuba	5:52.66	

=== Final A ===
Rank	Rowers	Country	Time	Notes
Gold medal	Wasielewski, Kolbowicz, Jelinski, Korol	Poland	5:41.33	
Silver medal	Agamennoni, Venier, Galtarossa, Raineri	Italy	5:43.57	
Bronze medal	Coeffic, Peltier, Bahain, Berrest	France	5:44.34	
4	Morgan, McRae, Long, Noonan	Australia	5:44.68	
5	Hughes, Stitt, Schroeder, Gault	United States	5:47.64	
6	Krüger, Bertram, Gruhne, Schreiber	Germany	5:50.96	

Poland completed the perfect quadrennial with wins at the 2005, 2006, and 2007 World Championships before capturing Olympic gold in Beijing.
