= Slovenia at the 2008 Summer Olympics =

- IOC code: SLO
- NOC: Olympic Committee of Slovenia
- Website: www.olympic.si (in Slovene and English)

in Beijing
- Competitors: 62 in 11 sports
- Flag bearers: Urška Žolnir (opening); Špela Ponomarenko (closing)
- Medals Ranked 39th: Gold 1 Silver 2 Bronze 2 Total 5

Summer Olympics appearances (overview)
- 1992; 1996; 2000; 2004; 2008; 2012; 2016; 2020; 2024; 2028

Other related appearances
- Austria (1912); Yugoslavia (1920–1988)

Slovenia, represented by the Slovenian Olympic Committee (Olimpijski komite Slovenije, abbreviated OKS), sent a team with 62 athletes to compete in 11 sports at the 2008 Summer Olympics in Beijing, People's Republic of China. The flag on the opening ceremony was held by Slovenian judoka Urška Žolnir, who was bronze in 2004 Olympics Judo Competition.

== Medalists ==
Medal	Name	Sport	Event
Gold	Primož Kozmus	Athletics	Men's hammer throw
Silver	Sara Isakovič	Swimming	Women's 200 m freestyle
Silver	Vasilij Žbogar	Sailing	Men's Laser class
Bronze	Lucija Polavder	Judo	Women's +78 kg
Bronze	Rajmond Debevec	Shooting	Men's 50 m rifle 3 positions

Notes

- Primož Kozmus wins the first ever Olympic track and field gold medal for independent Slovenia.
- Sara Isakovič wins the first swimming medal and reaches first women's swimming finals in independent Slovenia.
- Rajmond Debevec was ranked fourth before the last shot, but a mistake by the U.S. competitor and then-leader Matt Emmons allowed for Debevec to attain the bronze medal.

== Athletics ==
Key

- Note–Ranks given for track events are within the athlete's heat only
- Q = Qualified for the next round
- q = Qualified for the next round as a fastest loser or, in field events, by position without achieving the qualifying target
- NR = National record
- N/A = Round not applicable for the event
- Bye = Athlete not required to compete in round

Men
Track & road events

Athlete	Event	Heat		Quarterfinal		Semifinal		Final	
Athlete	Event	Result	Rank	Result	Rank	Result	Rank	Result	Rank
Boštjan Buč	3000 m steeplechase	8:21.24	8	—N/a				Did not advance	
Roman Kejžar	Marathon	—N/a						2:29:37	67
Matic Osovnikar	100 m	10.46	3 Q	10.24	6	Did not advance			
Matic Osovnikar	200 m	20.89	4 q	20.95	8	Did not advance			
Damjan Zlatnar	110 m hurdles	13.84	7 q	DNS*		Did not advance			

* Damjan Zlatnar did not compete in the quarterfinal round of the men's 110 metre hurdles because of Achilles' tendon injury.

Field events

Athlete	Event	Qualification		Final	
Athlete	Event	Distance	Position	Distance	Position
Primož Kozmus	Hammer throw	79.44	3 Q	82.02	1st place, gold medalist(s)
Matija Kranjc	Javelin throw	70.00	31	Did not advance	
Rožle Prezelj	High jump	2.25	=9 Q	2.20	12
Jurij Rovan	Pole vault	5.30	32	Did not advance	
Miran Vodovnik	Shot put	19.81	20	Did not advance	

Combined events – Decathlon

Athlete	Event	100 m	LJ	SP	HJ	400 m	110H	DT	PV	JT	1500 m	Final	Rank
Damjan Sitar	Result	11.21	7.25	12.41	2.05	50.10	15.03	39.25	4.00	47.23	4:37.37	7336	22
Damjan Sitar	Points	814	874	631	850	810	846	649	617	548	697	7336	22

Women
Track & road events

Athlete	Event	Heat		Quarterfinal		Semifinal		Final	
Athlete	Event	Result	Rank	Result	Rank	Result	Rank	Result	Rank
Brigita Langerholc	800 m	2:00.13	3 Q	—N/a		2:00.00	7	Did not advance	
Sonja Roman	1500 m	4:08.52	8	—N/a		Did not advance			
Pia Tajnikar	100 m	11.82	5	Did not advance					
Sabina Veit	200 m	23.62	5	Did not advance					

Field events

Athlete	Event	Qualification		Final	
Athlete	Event	Distance	Position	Distance	Position
Nina Kolarič	Long jump	6.40	27	Did not advance	
Martina Ratej	Javelin throw	55.30	37	Did not advance	
Marija Šestak	Triple jump	14.44	9 q	15.03 NR	6

== Badminton ==
Athlete	Event	Round of 64	Round of 32	Round of 16	Quarterfinal	Semifinal	Final / BM	
Athlete	Event	Opposition Score	Opposition Score	Opposition Score	Opposition Score	Opposition Score	Opposition Score	Rank
Maja Tvrdy	Women's singles	Bye	Konon (BLR); L 17–21, 14–21	Did not advance				

== Canoeing ==
=== Slalom ===
Athlete	Event	Preliminary						Semifinal		Final			
Athlete	Event	Run 1	Rank	Run 2	Rank	Total	Rank	Time	Rank	Time	Rank	Total	Rank
Peter Kauzer	Men's K-1	81.79	1	84.70	5	166.49	1 Q	85.42	13	Did not advance			

=== Sprint ===
Athlete	Event	Heats		Semifinals		Final	
Athlete	Event	Time	Rank	Time	Rank	Time	Rank
Jernej Zupančič Regent	Men's K-1 1000 m	3:33.29	4 QS	3:41.73	6	Did not advance	
Špela Ponomarenko	Women's K-1 500 m	1:49.97	3 QS	1:53.81	3 Q	1:52.36	6

Qualification Legend: QS = Qualify to semi-final; QF = Qualify directly to final

== Cycling ==
=== Road ===
Athlete	Event	Time	Rank
Borut Božič	Men's road race	Did not finish	
Jure Golčer	Men's road race	6:34:26	61
Simon Špilak	Men's road race	Did not finish	
Simon Špilak	Men's time trial	1:07:35	28
Tadej Valjavec	Men's road race	6:26:17	35
Sigrid Corneo	Women's road race	3:39:29	49

=== Mountain biking ===
Athlete	Event	Time	Rank
Blaža Klemenčič	Women's cross-country	LAP (1 lap)	21

== Gymnastics ==
=== Artistic ===
Men

Athlete	Event	Qualification								Final							
Athlete	Event	Apparatus						Total	Rank	Apparatus						Total	Rank
Athlete	Event	F	PH	R	V	PB	HB	Total	Rank	F	PH	R	V	PB	HB	Total	Rank
Mitja Petkovšek	Parallel bars	—N/a				16.125	—N/a	16.125	5 Q	—N/a				15.725	—N/a	15.725	5

Women

Athlete	Event	Qualification						Final					
Athlete	Event	Apparatus				Total	Rank	Apparatus				Total	Rank
Athlete	Event	F	V	UB	BB	Total	Rank	F	V	UB	BB	Total	Rank
Adela Šajn	Floor	13.700	—N/a			13.700	56	Did not advance					
Adela Šajn	Balance beam	—N/a			14.100	14.100	63	Did not advance					

== Judo ==
Men

Athlete	Event	Preliminary	Round of 32	Round of 16	Quarterfinals	Semifinals	Repechage 1	Repechage 2	Repechage 3	Final / BM	
Athlete	Event	Opposition Result	Opposition Result	Opposition Result	Opposition Result	Opposition Result	Opposition Result	Opposition Result	Opposition Result	Opposition Result	Rank
Rok Drakšič	−60 kg	Bye	Akhondzadeh (IRI); L 0010–0110	Did not advance							
Aljaž Sedej	−81 kg	Bye	Malekmohammadi (IRI); L 0000–1000	Did not advance							
Matjaž Ceraj	+100 kg	Rybak (BLR); L 0000–1000	Did not advance								

Women

Athlete	Event	Round of 32	Round of 16	Quarterfinals	Semifinals	Repechage 1	Repechage 2	Repechage 3	Final / BM	
Athlete	Event	Opposition Result	Opposition Result	Opposition Result	Opposition Result	Opposition Result	Opposition Result	Opposition Result	Opposition Result	Rank
Urška Žolnir	−63 kg	Décosse (FRA); L 0000–1010	Did not advance			Schlesinger (ISR); W 1001–0000	von Harnier (GER); W 0200–0000	Willeboordse (NED); L 0000–0001	Did not advance	
Lucija Polavder	+78 kg	Bye	Issanova (KAZ); W 1000–0001	Tserenkhand (MGL); W 1100–0000	Tsukada (JPN); L 0000–1010	Bye			Kim N-Y (KOR); W 0001–0000	3rd place, bronze medalist(s)

== Rowing ==
Men

Athlete	Event	Heats		Repechage		Semifinals		Final	
Athlete	Event	Time	Rank	Time	Rank	Time	Rank	Time	Rank
Iztok Čop; Luka Špik	Double sculls	6:39.49	3 SA/B	Bye		6:23.81	2 FA	6:33.36	6
Rok Kolander; Miha Pirih; Tomaž Pirih; Rok Rozman	Four	6:03.78	3 SA/B	Bye		5:56.08	1 FA	6:11.62	4
Gašper Fistravec; Janez Jurše; Jernej Jurše; Janez Zupanc	Quadruple sculls	5:57.02	4 R	6:12.64	4	Did not advance			

Qualification Legend: FA=Final A (medal); FB=Final B (non-medal); FC=Final C (non-medal); FD=Final D (non-medal); FE=Final E (non-medal); FF=Final F (non-medal); SA/B=Semifinals A/B; SC/D=Semifinals C/D; SE/F=Semifinals E/F; QF=Quarterfinals; R=Repechage

== Sailing ==
Men

Athlete	Event	Race											Net points	Final rank
Athlete	Event	1	2	3	4	5	6	7	8	9	10	M*	Net points	Final rank
Vasilij Žbogar	Laser	~~24~~	4	14	6	2	11	18	1	11	CAN	4	71	2nd place, silver medalist(s)
Karlo Hmeljak; Mitja Nevečny	470	3	11	19	10	18	~~DSQ~~	25	20	25	8	EL	139	18

Women

Athlete	Event	Race											Net points	Final rank
Athlete	Event	1	2	3	4	5	6	7	8	9	10	M*	Net points	Final rank
Vesna Dekleva; Klara Maučec	470	~~DSQ~~	3	8	16	12	3	15	18	14	3	EL	92	13

Open

Athlete	Event	Race											Net points	Final rank
Athlete	Event	1	2	3	4	5	6	7	8	9	10	M*	Net points	Final rank
Gašper Vinčec	Finn	9	11	6	5	3	13	8	10	CAN	CAN	20	72	7

M = Medal race; EL = Eliminated – did not advance into the medal race; CAN = Race cancelled

== Shooting ==
Men

Athlete	Event	Qualification		Final	
Athlete	Event	Points	Rank	Points	Rank
Rajmond Debevec	10 m air rifle	589	31	Did not advance	
Rajmond Debevec	50 m rifle prone	592	21	Did not advance	
Rajmond Debevec	50 m rifle 3 positions	1176	1 Q	1271.7	3rd place, bronze medalist(s)

== Swimming ==
Men

Athlete	Event	Heat		Semifinal		Final	
Athlete	Event	Time	Rank	Time	Rank	Time	Rank
Damir Dugonjič	100 m breaststroke	1:00.35 NR	9 Q	1:00.92	16	Did not advance	
Jernej Godec	50 m freestyle	22.21 NR	18	Did not advance			
Peter Mankoč	100 m freestyle	49.33	31	Did not advance			
Peter Mankoč	100 m butterfly	51.24 NR	5 Q	51.80	10	Did not advance	
Matjaž Markič	100 m breaststroke	1:01.31	24	Did not advance			
Luka Turk	400 m freestyle	DNS*		—N/a		Did not advance	

* Luka Turk withdrew from the Games because of injury.

Women

Athlete	Event	Heat		Semifinal		Final	
Athlete	Event	Time	Rank	Time	Rank	Time	Rank
Anja Čarman	100 m backstroke	1:02.21 NR	26	Did not advance			
Anja Čarman	200 m backstroke	2:10.49 NR	15 Q	2:12.46	16	Did not advance	
Sara Isakovič	200 m freestyle	1:55.86 OR	2 Q	1:56.50	1 Q	1:54.97	2nd place, silver medalist(s)
Sara Isakovič	100 m butterfly	58.68 NR	20	Did not advance			
Sara Isakovič	200 m butterfly	DNS		Did not advance			
Anja Klinar	200 m individual medley	2:15.39	25	Did not advance			
Anja Klinar	400 m individual medley	4:38.90 NR	16	—N/a		Did not advance	
Nina Sovinek	50 m freestyle	26.49	43	Did not advance			
Nina Sovinek	100 m freestyle	57.30	44	Did not advance			
Teja Zupan	10 km open water	—N/a				1:55:44.7	12

== Table tennis ==
Athlete	Event	Preliminary round	Round 1	Round 2	Round 3	Round 4	Quarterfinals	Semifinals	Final / BM	
Athlete	Event	Opposition Result	Opposition Result	Opposition Result	Opposition Result	Opposition Result	Opposition Result	Opposition Result	Opposition Result	Rank
Bojan Tokič	Men's singles	Bye		Bobocica (ITA); W 4–3	Ma L (CHN); L 1–4	Did not advance				

== See also ==
- Slovenia at the 2008 Summer Paralympics
