= Rowing at the 2004 Summer Olympics – Men's double sculls =

Men's double sculls at the Games of the XXVIII Olympiad
- Competitors: 28 from 14 nations

Medalists
1st place, gold medalist(s)		Sébastien Vieilledent; Adrien Hardy	France
2nd place, silver medalist(s)		Iztok Čop; Luka Špik	Slovenia
3rd place, bronze medalist(s)		Rossano Galtarossa; Alessio Sartori	Italy

These are the results of the men's double sculls competition in rowing at the 2004 Summer Olympics. In a sculling boat, each rower has two oars, one on each side of the boat. The Rowing events were held at the Schinias Olympic Rowing and Canoeing Centre.

== Medalists ==
Gold	Silver	Bronze
Adrien Hardy and Sébastien Vieilledent (FRA)	Iztok Čop and Luka Špik (SLO)	Rossano Galtarossa and Alessio Sartori (ITA)

== Heats ==
Fourteen boats raced in three heats on August 14. The top three boats in each heat advanced to the semifinals, and the remaining boats moved to the repechage.

- SF denotes qualification to semifinal
- R denotes qualification to repechage

=== Heat 1 ===
Rank	Athlete Name	Country	Time	Notes
1	Sébastien Vieilledent; Adrien Hardy	France	6:45.76	SF
2	Milan Doleček; Ondřej Synek	Czech Republic	6:50.67	SF
3	Brendan Long; Peter Hardcastle	Australia	6:52.34	SF
4	René Bertram; Christian Schreiber	Germany	6:58.22	R
5	Yosbel Martínez; Yoennis Hernández	Cuba	7:02.95	R

=== Heat 2 ===
Rank	Athlete Name	Country	Time	Notes
1	Rossano Galtarossa; Alessio Sartori	Italy	6:40.82	SF
2	Matthew Wells; Matt Langridge	Great Britain	6:48.13	SF
3	Aquil Abdullah; Henry Nuzum	United States	6:52.34	SF
4	Michał Jeliński; Adam Wojciechowski	Poland	7:00.38	R
5	Ákos Haller; Gábor Bencsik	Hungary	7:05.20	R

=== Heat 3 ===
Rank	Athlete Name	Country	Time	Notes
1	Luka Špik; Iztok Čop	Slovenia	6:45.26	SF
2	Nils-Torolv Simonsen; Morten Adamsen	Norway	6:49.90	SF
3	Leonid Gulov; Tõnu Endrekson	Estonia	6:58.80	SF
4	Kęstutis Keblys; Einaras Šiaudvytis	Lithuania	7:07.13	R

== Repechage ==
The five boats that did not qualify for the semifinals directly from the heats raced in a single repechage race on August 17. The top three boats qualified for the semifinals.

- SF denotes qualification to semifinal

Rank	Athlete Name	Country	Time	Notes
1	Ákos Haller; Gabor Bencsik	Hungary	6:15.60	SF
2	Yosbel Martínez; Yoennis Hernández	Cuba	6:16.38	SF
3	René Bertram; Christian Schreiber	Germany	6:16.94	SF
4	Michał Jeliński; Adam Wojciechowski	Poland	6:17.51	
5	Kęstutis Keblys; Einaras Šiaudvytis	Lithuania	6:24.56	

== Semifinals ==
Twelve boats raced in two semifinals on August 18.

- FA denotes qualification to final A
- FB denotes qualification to final B

=== Semifinal A ===
Rank	Athlete Name	Country	Time	Notes
1	Rossano Galtarossa; Alessio Sartori	Italy	6:11.49	FA
2	Sébastien Vieilledent; Adrien Hardy	France	6:12.40	FA
3	Aquil Abdullah; Henry Nuzum	United States	6:14.69	FA
4	Nils-Torolv Simonsen; Morten Adamsen	Norway	6:14.69	FA
5	René Bertram; Christian Schreiber	Germany	6:20.70	FB
6	Brendan Long; Peter Hardcastle	Australia	6:22.69	FB

=== Semifinal B ===
Rank	Athlete Name	Country	Time	Notes
1	Luka Špik; Iztok Čop	Slovenia	6:11.96	FA
2	Leonid Gulov; Tõnu Endrekson	Estonia	6:12.80	FA
3	Milan Doleček; Ondřej Synek	Czech Republic	6:13.65	FA
4	Matthew Wells; Matt Langridge	Great Britain	6:13.71	FB
5	Ákos Haller; Gabor Bencsik	Hungary	6:23.81	FB
6	Yosbel Martínez; Yoennis Hernández	Cuba	6:24.54	FB

== Finals ==
Final B was raced on August 19 and determined placings 8–12 in the event. Final A was raced on August 21 and determined the medal winners.

=== Final A ===
Rank	Athlete Name	Country	Time	Notes
1st place, gold medalist(s)	Sébastien Vieilledent; Adrien Hardy	France	6:29.00	
2nd place, silver medalist(s)	Luka Špik; Iztok Čop	Slovenia	6:31.72	
3rd place, bronze medalist(s)	Rossano Galtarossa; Alessio Sartori	Italy	6:32.93	
4	Leonid Gulov; Tõnu Endrekson	Estonia	6:35.30	
5	Milan Doleček; Ondřej Synek	Czech Republic	6:35.81	
6	Aquil Abdullah; Henry Nuzum	United States	6:36.86	
7	Nils-Torolv Simonsen; Morten Adamsen	Norway	6:37.25	

=== Final B ===
Rank	Athlete Name	Country	Time	Notes
1	Matthew Wells; Matt Langridge	Great Britain	6:14.40	
2	René Bertram; Christian Schreiber	Germany	6:14.97	
3	Yosbel Martínez; Yoennis Hernández	Cuba	6:15.37	
4	Ákos Haller; Gabor Bencsik	Hungary	6:15.39	
5	Brendan Long; Peter Hardcastle	Australia	6:22.57	
