= Joseph Sullivan (rower) =

New Zealand rower (born 1987)

Joseph Sullivan MNZM
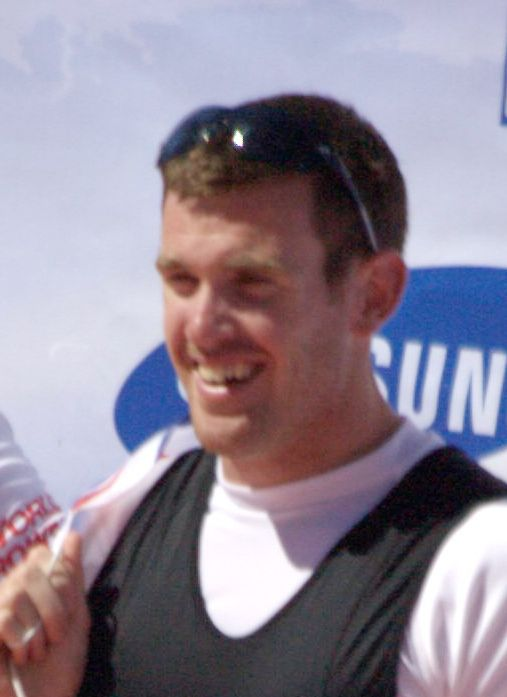
- Sullivan in 2010

Personal information
- Born: 11 April 1987 (age 39) Rangiora, New Zealand
Medal record
Men's rowing
Representing New Zealand
Olympic Games
Gold medal – first place	2012 London	Double sculls
World Rowing Championships
Gold medal – first place	2010 Karapiro	Double sculls
Gold medal – first place	2011 Bled	Double sculls
World Rowing U23 Championships
Gold medal – first place	2007 Glasgow	Single sculls
Gold medal – first place	2008 Munich	Single sculls
Gold medal – first place	2009 Račice	Double sculls

Joseph Sullivan MNZM (born 11 April 1987) is a New Zealand rower.

As a student at Queen Charlotte College in Picton, Sullivan competed at the 2003, 2004 and 2005 national secondary school rowing championships (Maadi Cup). He was a member of the crews that won the boys under-18 double sculls for the school three years running, and won the boys under-18 single sculls events in 2004 and 2005. In his home town, he is known as "the pride of Picton".

He won back-to-back gold medals in the men's double sculls with rowing partner Nathan Cohen at both the 2010 (at Lake Karapiro, by six hundredths of a second over Germans Hans Gruhne and Stephan Krüger) and 2011 World Rowing Championships (in Slovenia). It was the first gold medal win for a New Zealand premier double sculls combination at the world championships.

At the 2012 Summer Olympics at Eton Dorney, Windsor, Sullivan and rowing partner Nathan Cohen won the gold medal in the men's double scull event. They broke the Olympic best time in the heats.

In the finals they were in last place at the 500 m mark, in fifth place at the 1000 m mark, in fourth at the 1500 m mark, and then sprinted as the line approached to take first for the victory, with a last quarter of 1:33. They won with a time of 6 minutes, 31.67 seconds. They finished ahead of the Italy's Alessio Sartori and Romano Battisti by 1:13 seconds, and Slovenian 2000 Olympic champions and 2004 silver medalists Luka Špik and Iztok Čop came in third. Sullivan and Cohen were awarded a Halberg Award for "New Zealand's Favourite Sporting Moment".

Sullivan won five consecutive world titles at U23 and Elite World Rowing Championships. In the 2013 New Year Honours, Sullivan was appointed a Member of the New Zealand Order of Merit for services to rowing.

In June 2014, Sullivan announced he was retiring from rowing in order to pursue a career with the New Zealand Fire Service as a firefighter based in Auckland. In 2016, Sullivan joined Emirates Team New Zealand, as a grinder a (i.e. spinning the handles that produce hydraulic pressure to move the boat's wings and daggerboards), for the 2017 America's Cup in Bermuda.
