= Nathan Cohen (rower) =

New Zealand rower (born 1986)

Nathan Cohen MNZM
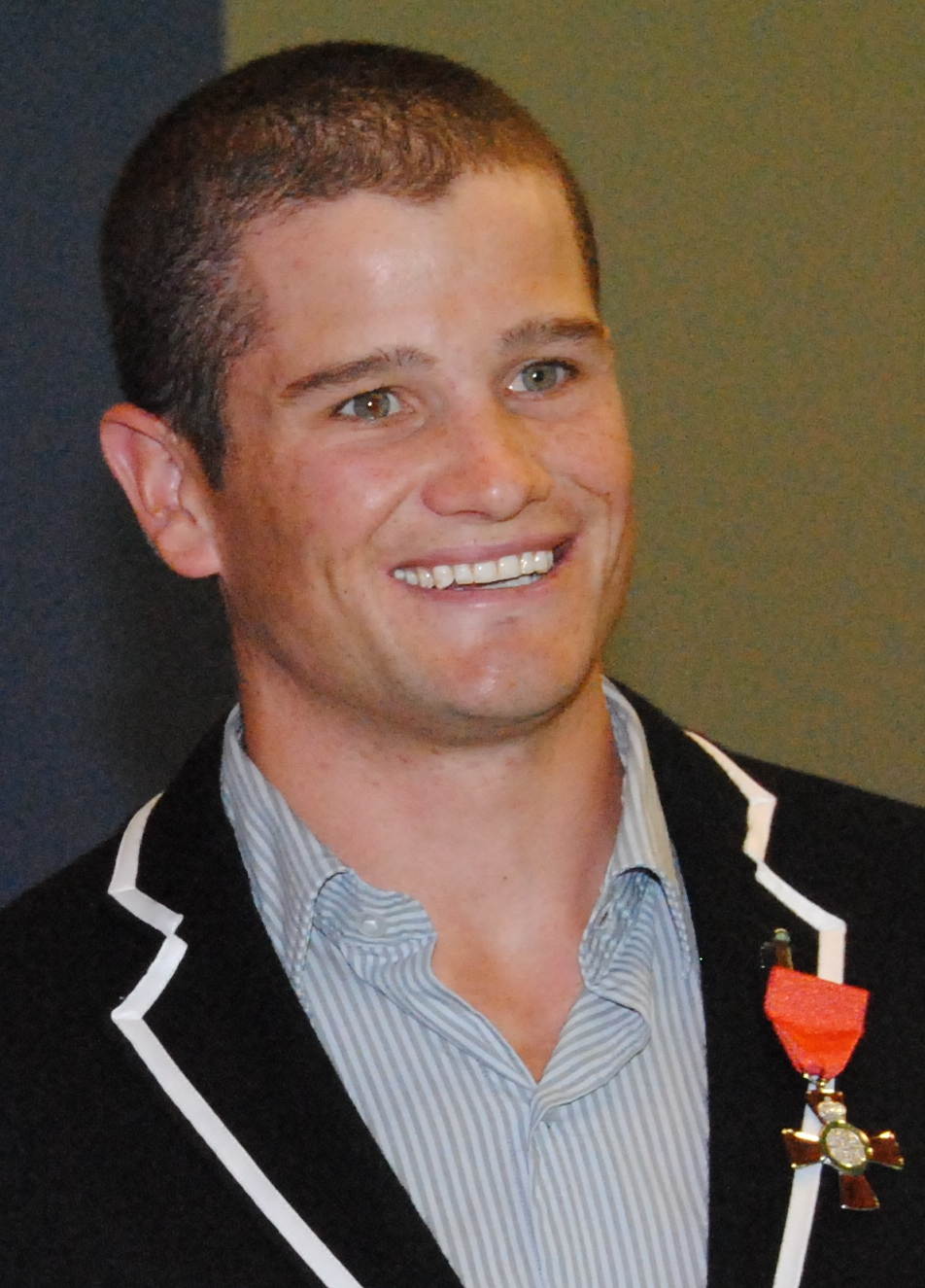
- Cohen in 2013

Personal information
- Full name: Nathan Phillip Cohen
- Born: 2 January 1986 (age 40) Christchurch, New Zealand
- Education: University of Canterbury; Massey University; University of Otago; University of Waikato (BMS; 2012)
- Years active: 2000–2013
- Height: 184 cm (6 ft 0 in)
- Weight: 192 lb (87 kg)

Sport
- Sport: Rowing
- Event: sculls
- University team: Otago University Rowing Club
- Club: Invercargill Rowing Club
- Coached by: Calvin Ferguson

Achievements and titles
- Highest world ranking: World champion
Medal record
Men's rowing
Representing New Zealand
Olympic Games
Gold medal – first place	2012 London	Double sculls
World Rowing Championships
Gold medal – first place	2010 Karapiro	Double sculls
Gold medal – first place	2011 Bled	Double sculls
World University Games
Gold medal – first place	2006 Trakai	Single sculls
- Updated on 30 October 2013

Nathan Phillip Cohen MNZM (born 2 January 1986) is a New Zealand rower. He is a two-time world champion, and won a gold medal in the Olympics. In 2006, rowing a single scull, he won a gold medal at the World University Games. In doing so, he became the first New Zealander to win a gold medal at the World University Games in any sport. Cohen and his rowing partner, Joseph Sullivan, won back-to-back gold medals in the men's double sculls at both the 2010 and 2011 World Rowing Championships. At the 2012 Summer Olympics, he and his partner won the gold medal in the men's double sculls, after breaking the Olympic best time in the heats. In 2013, Cohen was made a Member of the New Zealand Order of Merit for his services to rowing.

== Early years ==
Cohen was born in Christchurch, in the South Island of New Zealand. His father is Phil Cohen. His younger brother Hayden, exactly six years his junior, is also a rower. Hayden was the 2012 U23 World Champion in the double scull, and in 2013 partnered with Nathan in the quad scull, winning a silver medal in the first World Cup regatta held in Sydney.

Cohen grew up in Invercargill in Southland, and started rowing in 2000. He grew up racing on Lake Ruataniwha in Twizel, in the South Island of New Zealand.

== Career ==
=== 2003–06; World University Games champion ===
Cohen won the boys under-18 single scull event at the New Zealand Secondary School Rowing Championships in 2003, while attending James Hargest High School. He credits that with being his most memorable race, saying: "It showed me that if you wanted something enough and were willing to push yourself beyond all your perceived limits, anything was possible."

After graduating high school, he began studying for an engineering degree at the University of Canterbury. He later switched to studying for a commerce degree at Massey University, by correspondence. He attended the University of Otago, where he was a member of the Otago University Rowing Club. He is a member of the Invercargill Rowing Club, which honored him for his accomplishments by making him a life member.

In both 2003 and 2004, Cohen was second in the World Rowing Junior Championships in the single scull. In 2005, he won a silver medal in the World Rowing U23 Championships.

In the summer of 2006, rowing single sculls Cohen won a silver medal at the World Rowing U23 Championships in Belgium, a gold medal in the Commonwealth Rowing Regatta in Scotland, and a gold medal at the World University Games by 8 seconds in Lithuania. He became the first New Zealander to win a gold medal at the World University Championship in any sport. In recognition of his accomplishment, Cohen was awarded an Outstanding Achievement Award at the NZ Universities Blues Awards.

=== 2007–11; World champion ===
In 2007, Cohen won a silver medal at the United States World Rowing Challenge in Oklahoma in men's single sculls. In 2007 and early 2008, he rowed with Matthew Trott in the World Rowing Championships in Munich, coming in sixth in the double sculls and securing a berth for New Zealand at the Olympics the following year.

At the 2008 Summer Olympics in Shunyi Olympic Rowing-Canoeing Park, Shunyi, Beijing in August 2008, he and Rob Waddell finished fourth in the double sculls final.

Cohen won back-to-back world championships. He won a gold medal in the men's double sculls with rowing partner Joseph Sullivan at both the 2010 (at Lake Karapiro, by six hundredths of a second over Germans Hans Gruhne and Stephan Krüger, in 6:10.76) and 2011 World Rowing Championships (in Slovenia, in 6:22.63).

In 2011, he won the 2011 New Zealand National Rowing Championships single scull title at Lake Ruataniwha in Twizel, with a time of 7 minutes, 3.97 seconds, to win the Sir Bernard Freyberg Cup. He beat out single scull world champion Mahé Drysdale by 7.46 seconds. He also won the double sculls with ex-partner Trott. He was named Sportsman of the Year in the 2011 University of Waikato Blues Awards.

=== 2012–present; Olympic champion ===
At the 2012 Summer Olympics at Eton Dorney, Windsor, Cohen and rowing partner Sullivan won the gold medal in the men's double sculls, after a training regimen of 200 km each week on the water. They broke the Olympic record best time in the heats, with a time of 6:11.30.

In the finals they were in last place at the 500 m mark, in fifth place at the 1000 m mark, in fourth at the 1500 m mark, and then sprinted as the line approached to take first for the victory, with a last quarter of 1:33. They won with a time of 6 minutes, 31.67 seconds. They finished ahead of Italy's Alessio Sartori and Romano Battisti by 1.13 seconds, and Slovenian 2000 Olympic champions and 2004 silver medalists Luka Špik and Iztok Čop came in third. Cohen became the first person from Southland to win an Olympic medal for New Zealand. Cohen and Sullivan were awarded a Halberg Award for "New Zealand's Favourite Sporting Moment".

Cohen also obtained a Bachelor of Management Studies (BMS) from the University of Waikato in 2012.

In the 2013 New Year Honours, Cohen was appointed a Member of the New Zealand Order of Merit for services to rowing. Later that year he won the New Zealand national single sculls title at the 2013 New Zealand National Rowing Championships, again at Lake Ruataniwha, in a time of 6:57.76. He also won the New Zealand Male Rower of the Year Award.

Cohen began rowing the quadruple scull in 2013. His crew won a silver medal at the Sydney World Cup regatta.

During training in April 2013, Cohen suffered an irregular heartbeat, later diagnosed as supraventricular tachycardia (SVT). That August, he withdrew from the World Rowing Championships in Chungju, Korea, due to a recurrence of the problem during preliminary heats. In December 2013, he announced his retirement from the sport due to this medical condition.

He later started competing again. At the 2017 New Zealand rowing nationals at Lake Ruataniwha, he partnered with his brother Hayden for the men's double sculls, where they came sixth in the men's premier double sculls, with limited training. The brothers teamed up to win the senior men's doubles sculls and the men's senior quad sculls. Cohen then went on to win the senior men's single also. In 2019 he competed in the fours with his brother Hayden, Joe Findlay and Italian Daniele Danesin.
