= Rowing at the 2012 Summer Olympics – Men's double sculls =

Men's double sculls at the Games of the XXX Olympiad
- Venue: Eton Dorney
- Date: 28 July – 2 August 2012
- Competitors: 26 from 13 nations
- Winning time: 6:31.67

Medalists
1st place, gold medalist(s)		Nathan Cohen; Joseph Sullivan	New Zealand
2nd place, silver medalist(s)		Alessio Sartori; Romano Battisti	Italy
3rd place, bronze medalist(s)		Luka Špik; Iztok Čop	Slovenia

The men's double sculls competition at the 2012 Summer Olympics in London took place are at Dorney Lake which, for the purposes of the Games venue, is officially termed Eton Dorney.

== Schedule ==
All times are British Summer Time (UTC+1)

Date	Time	Round
Saturday, 28 July 2012	10:30	Heats
Sunday, 29 July 2012	09:30	Repechage
Tuesday, 31 July 2012	12:20	Semifinals
Thursday, 2 August 2012	09:50	Final B
Thursday, 2 August 2012	11:50	Final

== Results ==
=== Heats ===
First three of each heat qualify to the semifinals, remainder goes to the repeachge.

==== Heat 1 ====
Rank	Rowers	Country	Time	Notes
1	Eric Knittel; Stephan Krüger	Germany	6:17.74	Q
=2	Rolandas Maščinskas; Saulius Ritter	Lithuania	6:17.78	Q
=2	Luka Špik; Iztok Čop	Slovenia	6:17.78	Q
4	David Crawshay; Scott Brennan	Australia	6:21.25	R
5	Michael Braithwaite; Kevin Kowalyk	Canada	6:34.11	R

==== Heat 2 ====
Rank	Rowers	Country	Time	Notes
1	Nils Jakob Hoff; Kjetil Borch	Norway	6:16.31	Q
2	Alessio Sartori; Romano Battisti	Italy	6:18.50	Q
3	Julien Bahain; Cédric Berrest	France	6:19.61	Q
4	Dmytro Mikhay; Artem Morozov	Ukraine	6:49.70	R

==== Heat 3 ====
Rank	Rowers	Country	Time	Notes
1	Nathan Cohen; Joseph Sullivan	New Zealand	6:11.30	Q (OR)
2	Bill Lucas; Sam Townsend	Great Britain	6:11.94	Q
3	Ariel Suárez; Cristian Rosso	Argentina	6:13.68	Q
4	Jüri-Mikk Udam; Geir Suursild	Estonia	6:33.88	R

=== Repechage ===
First three qualify to the semifinals.

Rank	Rowers	Country	Time	Notes
1	David Crawshay; Scott Brennan	Australia	6.25.36	Q
2	Dmytro Mikhay; Artem Morozov	Ukraine	6:30.19	Q
3	Michael Braithwaite; Kevin Kowalyk	Canada	6:30.74	Q
4	Jüri-Mikk Udam; Geir Suursild	Estonia	6:38.50	

=== Semifinals ===
First three qualify to the final.

==== Semifinal 1 ====
Rank	Rower	Country	Time	Notes
1	Ariel Suárez; Cristian Rosso	Argentina	6:19.40	Q
2	Nathan Cohen; Joseph Sullivan	New Zealand	6:19.79	Q
3	Alessio Sartori; Romano Battisti	Italy	6:20.68	Q
4	Eric Knittel; Stephan Krüger	Germany	6:22.54	
5	David Crawshay; Scott Brennan	Australia	6:23.47	
6	Dmytro Mikhay; Artem Morozov	Ukraine	6:36.52	

==== Semifinal 2 ====
Rank	Rower	Country	Time	Notes
1	Luka Špik; Iztok Čop	Slovenia	6:19.97	Q
2	Rolandas Maščinskas; Saulius Ritter	Lithuania	6:21.62	Q
3	Bill Lucas; Sam Townsend	Great Britain	6:22.47	Q
4	Nils Jakob Hoff; Kjetil Borch	Norway	6:22.88	
5	Julien Bahain; Cédric Berrest	France	6:29.61	
6	Michael Braithwaite; Kevin Kowalyk	Canada	6:38.94	

=== Finals ===
==== Final B ====
Rank	Rowers	Country	Time
1	Nils Jakob Hoff; Kjetil Borch	Norway	6:20.82
2	David Crawshay; Scott Brennan	Australia	6:22.19
3	Eric Knittel; Stephan Krüger	Germany	6:23.36
4	Julien Bahain; Cédric Berrest	France	6:26.44
5	Dmytro Mikhay; Artem Morozov	Ukraine	6:31.51
6	Michael Braithwaite; Kevin Kowalyk	Canada	6:32.61

==== Final A ====
New Zealand rower Hamish Bond watched fellow team members Nathan Cohen and Joseph Sullivan in their final, and with 500 m to go, they were 3.5 sec down on the leaders and in fourth place; whilst they were the reigning world champions and had dominated the qualifying races, Bond was convinced that they had no chance of winning their final. But they had the most impressive sprint and won by half a length.

Rank	Rowers	Country	Time
1st place, gold medalist(s)	Nathan Cohen; Joseph Sullivan	New Zealand	6:31.67
2nd place, silver medalist(s)	Alessio Sartori; Romano Battisti	Italy	6:32.80
3rd place, bronze medalist(s)	Luka Špik; Iztok Čop	Slovenia	6:34.35
4	Ariel Suárez; Cristian Rosso	Argentina	6:36.36
5	Bill Lucas; Sam Townsend	Great Britain	6:40.54
6	Rolandas Maščinskas; Saulius Ritter	Lithuania	6:42.69
