= Lithuania at the 2004 Summer Olympics =

- IOC code: LTU
- NOC: Lithuanian National Olympic Committee
- Website: www.ltok.lt (in Lithuanian and English)

in Athens
- Competitors: 59 in 13 sports
- Flag bearer: Saulius Štombergas
- Medals Ranked 45th: Gold 1 Silver 2 Bronze 0 Total 3

Summer Olympics appearances (overview)
- 1924; 1928; 1932–1988; 1992; 1996; 2000; 2004; 2008; 2012; 2016; 2020; 2024; 2028

Other related appearances
- Russian Empire (1908–1912); Soviet Union (1952–1988)

Lithuania competed at the 2004 Summer Olympics in Athens, Greece, from 13 to 29 August 2004. This was the nation's sixth appearance at the Summer Olympics. The National Olympic Committee of Lithuania (Lithuanian: Lietuvos tautinis olimpinis komitetas, LTOK) sent the nation's smallest delegation to the Games since the 1992 Summer Olympics in Barcelona. A total of 59 athletes, 47 men and 12 women, competed in 13 sports, including the men's basketball team as the nation's team-based sport.

The Lithuanian squad featured returning Olympic medalists: discus thrower Virgilijus Alekna, trap shooter Daina Gudzinevičiūtė, and the men's basketball team, being led by team captain Saulius Štombergas, who later became the nation's flag bearer in the opening ceremony. Along with Alekna, Stombergas, and Gudzineviciute, road cyclists and twin sisters Jolanta and Rasa Polikevičiūtė and javelin thrower Rita Ramanauskaitė made their third Olympic appearances as the most experienced members of the team. Other notable Lithuanian athletes included Stombergas' teammate and NBA basketball star Darius Songaila, track cyclist Simona Krupeckaitė, and two-time world champion Andrejus Zadneprovskis in men's modern pentathlon.

Lithuania left Athens with a total of three medals (one gold and two silver), the lowest in its Summer Olympic history since the 1996 Summer Olympics in Atlanta. Discus thrower Alekna was originally placed in a silver medal spot, but eventually defended his Olympic title at the time of the medal ceremony, when Hungary's Róbert Fazekas committed an anti-doping violation for failing to submit a proper urine sample during the test, which ended up in a disqualification. Meanwhile, heptathlete Austra Skujytė and modern pentathlete Zadneprovskis rounded out the Olympic podium with a silver medal each for the Lithuanian team.

== Medalists ==
Medal	Name	Sport	Event	Date
Gold	Virgilijus Alekna	Athletics	Men's discus throw	August 23
Silver	Austra Skujytė	Athletics	Women's heptathlon	August 21
Silver	Andrejus Zadneprovskis	Modern pentathlon	Men's event	August 26

== Athletics ==
Lithuanian athletes have so far achieved qualifying standards in the following athletics events (up to a maximum of 3 athletes in each event at the 'A' Standard, and 1 at the 'B' Standard).

Virgilijus Alekna was originally placed in a silver medal position in the men's discus throw. A few days before the medal ceremony took place, Hungary's Róbert Fazekas committed an anti-doping violation by failing to submit a proper urine sample during the test, and was eventually expelled from the Games, lifting Alekna's position to a gold medal and more importantly, a defense for his Olympic title.

Key

- Note–Ranks given for track events are within the athlete's heat only
- Q = Qualified for the next round
- q = Qualified for the next round as a fastest loser or, in field events, by position without achieving the qualifying target
- NR = National record
- N/A = Round not applicable for the event
- Bye = Athlete not required to compete in round

Men
Track & road events

Athlete	Event	Heat		Semifinal		Final	
Athlete	Event	Result	Rank	Result	Rank	Result	Rank
Gintaras Andriuškevičius	20 km walk	—N/a				1:27:56	28
Mindaugas Norbutas	800 m	1:47.38	6	Did not advance			
Mindaugas Pukštas	Marathon	—N/a				2:33:02	74
Daugvinas Zujus	50 km walk	—N/a				4:09:41	30

Field events

Athlete	Event	Qualification		Final	
Athlete	Event	Distance	Position	Distance	Position
Virgilijus Alekna	Discus throw	69.89	1 Q	69.49	1st place, gold medalist(s)

Women
Track & road events

Athlete	Event	Heat		Quarterfinal		Semifinal		Final	
Athlete	Event	Result	Rank	Result	Rank	Result	Rank	Result	Rank
Živilė Balčiūnaitė	Marathon	—N/a						2:35:01	14
Agnė Eggerth	100 m	11.44	5	Did not advance					
Inga Juodeškienė	Marathon	—N/a						3:09:18	63
Sonata Milušauskaitė	20 km walk	—N/a						1:33:36	23
Kristina Saltanovič	20 km walk	—N/a						1:32:22	19

Field events

Athlete	Event	Qualification		Final	
Athlete	Event	Distance	Position	Distance	Position
Rita Ramanauskaitė	Javelin throw	55.17	31	Did not advance	

Combined events – Heptathlon

Athlete	Event	100H	HJ	SP	200 m	LJ	JT	800 m	Final	Rank
Austra Skujytė	Result	14.03	1.76	16.40	24.82	6.30	49.58	2:15.92	6435	2nd place, silver medalist(s)
Austra Skujytė	Points	974	928	955	903	943	852	880	6435	2nd place, silver medalist(s)

== Basketball ==
=== Men's tournament ===
Roster

The following is the Lithuania roster in the men's basketball tournament of the 2004 Summer Olympics.

Lithuania men's national basketball team – 2004 Summer Olympics roster
Players
Coaches

Pos.	No.	Name	Age – Date of birth	Height	Club	Ctr.
G	4	Vidas Ginevičius	26 – 11 May 1978	1.93 m (6 ft 4 in)	Žalgiris Kaunas	(Lithuania)
F	5	Mindaugas Žukauskas	28 – 24 August 1975	2.01 m (6 ft 7 in)	Montepaschi Siena	(Italy)
G	6	Arvydas Macijauskas	24 – 19 January 1980	1.92 m (6 ft 4 in)	TAU Cerámica	(Spain)
F	7	Saulius Štombergas (C)	30 – 14 December 1973	2.04 m (6 ft 8 in)	UNICS Kazan	(Russia)
G	8	Ramūnas Šiškauskas	25 – 10 September 1978	1.98 m (6 ft 6 in)	Lietuvos Rytas	(Lithuania)
F	9	Darius Songaila	26 – 14 February 1978	2.04 m (6 ft 8 in)	Sacramento Kings	(United States)
G	10	Donatas Slanina	27 – 23 April 1977	1.92 m (6 ft 4 in)	Caja San Fernando Sevilla	(Spain)
C	11	Eurelijus Žukauskas	30 – 22 August 1973	2.18 m (7 ft 2 in)	UNICS Kazan	(Russia)
F/C	12	Kšyštof Lavrinovič	24 – 1 November 1979	2.10 m (6 ft 11 in)	Ural Great Perm	(Russia)
G	13	Šarūnas Jasikevičius	28 – 5 March 1976	1.93 m (6 ft 4 in)	Maccabi Tel Aviv	(Israel)
G/F	14	Dainius Šalenga	27 – 15 April 1977	1.98 m (6 ft 6 in)	Žalgiris Kaunas	(Lithuania)
C	15	Robertas Javtokas	24 – 20 March 1980	2.10 m (6 ft 11 in)	Lietuvos Rytas	(Lithuania)

Head coach

- (Lithuania) Antanas Sireika

Assistant coach(es)

- (Lithuania) Valdemaras Chomičius
- (Lithuania) Gintaras Krapikas
- (United States) Donnie Nelson

Legend

- (C) Team captain
- nat field describes country
  of last club
  before the tournament
- Age as of August 13, 2004

Group play

Pos	Team	Pld	W	L	PF	PA	PD	Pts	Qualification
1	Lithuania	5	5	0	468	414	+54	10	Quarterfinals
2	Greece	5	3	2	389	343	+46	8 (Note: Head-to-head record: Greece 1–1 (1.10 GAvg), Puerto Rico 1–1 (0.99), United States 1–1 (0.92))	Quarterfinals
3	Puerto Rico	5	3	2	410	411	−1	8	Quarterfinals
4	United States	5	3	2	418	389	+29	8	Quarterfinals
5	Australia	5	1	4	383	411	−28	6	9th place playoff
6	Angola	5	0	5	321	421	−100	5	11th place playoff

Source: FIBA archive
Rules for classification: 1) points; 2) head-to-head points; 3) head-to-head goal average; 4) head-to-head number of points scored.
Notes:

15 August 2004
9:00

Angola	73–78	Lithuania
Scoring by quarter: 24–14, 8–14, 23–28, 18–22
Pts: Lutonda 17; Rebs: Lutonda 4 Asts: Lutonda 6		Pts: Lavrinovič, E. Žukauskas 15 each Rebs: E. Žukauskas 11; Asts: Jasikevičius 6

Helliniko Indoor Arena, Athens
Attendance: 400
Referees: Chantal Julien (FRA), Ma Li Jun (CHN)

17 August 2004
14:30

Lithuania	98–90	Puerto Rico
Scoring by quarter: 26–32, 23–12, 22–22, 27–24
Pts: Šiškauskas 23; Rebs: E. Žukauskas 8 Asts: Jasikevičius 7		Pts: Arroyo, Ayuso 25 each Rebs: Hourruitiner 6 Asts: Arroyo, Ayuso 2 each

Helliniko Indoor Arena, Athens
Attendance: 12,500
Referees:
Pablo Estevez (Argentina)
Zoran Šutulović (Serbia and Montenegro)

19 August 2004
22:15

Greece	76–98	Lithuania
Scoring by quarter: 10–28, 15–26, 19–22, 32–22
Pts: Zisis 18; Rebs: Papanikolaou 7 Asts: Papaloukas 3		Pts: Šiškauskas 25; Rebs: Javtokas, Songaila 5 each Asts: Jasikevičius 8

Helliniko Indoor Arena, Athens
Attendance: 12,000
Referees:
Renato Santos (Brazil)
Pablo Estevez (Argentina)

21 August 2004
20:00

Lithuania	94–90	United States
Scoring by quarter: 23–26, 21–23, 23–20, 27–21
Pts: Jasikevičius 28; Rebs: Štombergas 10; Asts: Jasikevičius 4		Pts: Jefferson 20; Rebs: Duncan 20; Asts: Marbury 3

Helliniko Indoor Arena, Athens
Attendance: 12,000
Referees:
Reynaldo Sanchez (Dominican Republic)
Zoran Šutulović (Serbia and Montenegro)

23 August 2004
11:15

Lithuania	100–85	Australia
Scoring by quarter: 20–19, 32–9, 23–38, 25–19
Pts: Javtokas 23; Rebs: Javtokas 9 Asts: Jasikevičius 4		Pts: Bogut, Saville 21 each Rebs: Bogut 9 Asts: Heal 3

Helliniko Indoor Arena, Athens
Attendance: 7,650
Referees: Vicente Bulto (ESP), Alejandro Chiti (ARG)

Quarterfinals

26 August 2004
16:45

Lithuania	95–75	China
Scoring by quarter: 25–19, 28–18, 21–20, 21–18
Pts: Macijauskas 32; Rebs: E. Žukauskas 8 Asts: Šiškauskas 4		Pts: Yao Ming 29; Rebs: Yao Ming 11; Asts: Liu Wei 4

Olympic Indoor Hall, Athens
Attendance: 14,500
Referees: Mike Homsy (CAN), Christos Christodoulou (GRE)

Semifinals

27 August 2004
22:15

Italy	100–91	Lithuania
Scoring by quarter: 20–26, 29–17, 24–20, 27–28
Pts: Basile 31; Rebs: Marconato 9 Asts: Marconato, Pozzecco 3 each		Pts: Macijauskas 26; Rebs: Šiškauskas 7 Asts: Jasikevičius 9

Olympic Indoor Hall, Athens
Attendance: 14,500
Referees:
Reynaldo Sanchez (Dominican Republic)
José Carrión (Puerto Rico)

Bronze medal final

28 August 2004
20:45

Lithuania	96–104	United States
Scoring by quarter: 24–24, 20–25, 27–25, 25–30
Pts: Macijauskas 24; Rebs: Javtokas 6 Asts: Jasikevičius 4		Pts: Marion 22; Rebs: Boozer, Duncan 8 each Asts: Wade 6

Olympic Indoor Hall, Athens
Attendance: 14,500
Referees:
Pablo Estevez (Argentina)
Giampaolo Cicoria (Italy)

== Boxing ==
Lithuania sent two boxers to Athens. One lost his first bout, in the round of 32. The other won his first to advance to the quarterfinal, where he was defeated.

Athlete	Event	Round of 32	Round of 16	Quarterfinals	Semifinals	Final	
Athlete	Event	Opposition Result	Opposition Result	Opposition Result	Opposition Result	Opposition Result	Rank
Rolandas Jasevičius	Welterweight	Bashirov (TKM); L 21–54	Did not advance				
Jaroslavas Jakšto	Super heavyweight	—N/a	Bisbal (PUR); W 26–17	Aly (EGY); L 11–19	Did not advance		

== Canoeing ==
=== Sprint ===
Athlete	Event	Heats		Semifinals		Final	
Athlete	Event	Time	Rank	Time	Rank	Time	Rank
Alvydas Duonėla	Men's K-1 500 m	1:40.365	3 q	1:40.253	4	Did not advance	
Romas Petrukanecas	Men's K-1 1000 m	3:37.758	7 q	3:39.493	9	Did not advance	
Egidijus Balčiūnas; Alvydas Duonėla	Men's K-2 500 m	1:30.521	2 q	1:30.270	1 Q	1:29.868	7

Qualification Legend: Q = Qualify to final; q = Qualify to semifinal

== Cycling ==
=== Road ===
Athlete	Event	Time	Rank
Jolanta Polikevičiūtė	Women's road race	3:25:42	31
Rasa Polikevičiūtė	Women's road race	3:25:42	29
Rasa Polikevičiūtė	Women's time trial	34:34.48	23
Edita Pučinskaitė	Women's road race	3:25:10	9
Edita Pučinskaitė	Women's time trial	32:42.12	10

=== Track ===
Sprint

Athlete	Event	Qualification		Round 1	Repechage 1	Quarterfinals	Semifinals	Final	
Athlete	Event	Time Speed (km/h)	Rank	Opposition Time Speed (km/h)	Opposition Time Speed (km/h)	Opposition Time Speed (km/h)	Opposition Time Speed (km/h)	Opposition Time Speed (km/h)	Rank
Simona Krupeckaitė	Women's sprint	11.430; 62.992	6	Grankovskaya (RUS); W 11.872; 60.646	Bye	Abassova (RUS); L, W 12.632, L	Did not advance	5th place final Tsylinskaya (BLR); Meinke (GER); Larreal (VEN); L	7

Pursuit

Athlete	Event	Qualification		Semifinals		Final	
Athlete	Event	Time	Rank	Opponent Results	Rank	Opponent Results	Rank
Linas Balčiūnas	Men's individual pursuit	4:22.392	9	Did not advance			
Linas Balčiūnas; Aivaras Baranauskas; Ignatas Konovalovas; Tomas Vaitkus; Raimondas Vilčinskas	Men's team pursuit	4:08.812	8 Q	Australia; LAP	8	Did not advance	

Time trial

Athlete	Event	Time	Rank
Simona Krupeckaitė	Women's time trial	34.317	4

Omnium

Athlete	Event	Points	Laps	Rank
Tomas Vaitkus	Men's points race	Did not finish		

== Judo ==
Lithuania has qualified a single judoka.

Athlete	Event	Preliminary	Round of 32	Round of 16	Quarterfinals	Semifinals	Repechage 1	Repechage 2	Repechage 3	Final / BM	
Athlete	Event	Opposition Result	Opposition Result	Opposition Result	Opposition Result	Opposition Result	Opposition Result	Opposition Result	Opposition Result	Opposition Result	Rank
Albertas Techovas	Men's −60 kg	Yekutiel (ISR); L 0000–0101	Did not advance								

== Modern pentathlon ==
Two Lithuanian athletes qualified to compete in the modern pentathlon event through the European and UIPM World Championships.

Athlete	Event	Shooting (10 m air pistol)			Fencing (épée one touch)			Swimming (200 m freestyle)			Riding (show jumping)			Running (3000 m)			Total points	Final rank
Athlete	Event	Points	Rank	MP Points	Results	Rank	MP points	Time	Rank	MP points	Penalties	Rank	MP points	Time	Rank	MP Points	Total points	Final rank
Edvinas Krungolcas	Men's	171	26	988	16–15	=11	832	2:07.23	12	1276	112	15	1088	13:11.15	32	236	4420	31
Andrejus Zadneprovskis	Men's	172	=23	1000	19–12	=2	916	2:04.34	6	1308	112	12	1088	9:31.46	1	1116	5428	2nd place, silver medalist(s)

== Rowing ==
Lithuanian rowers qualified the following boats:

Men

Athlete	Event	Heats		Repechage		Semifinals		Final	
Athlete	Event	Time	Rank	Time	Rank	Time	Rank	Time	Rank
Kęstutis Keblys; Einaras Šiaudvytis	Double sculls	7:07.13	4 R	6:24.56	5	Did not advance			

Qualification Legend: FA=Final A (medal); FB=Final B (non-medal); FC=Final C (non-medal); FD=Final D (non-medal); FE=Final E (non-medal); FF=Final F (non-medal); SA/B=Semifinals A/B; SC/D=Semifinals C/D; SE/F=Semifinals E/F; R=Repechage

== Sailing ==
Lithuanian sailors have qualified one boat for each of the following events.

Open

Athlete	Event	Race											Net points	Final rank
Athlete	Event	1	2	3	4	5	6	7	8	9	10	M*	Net points	Final rank
Giedrius Gužys	Laser	31	19	21	24	21	~~34~~	24	19	25	27	28	239	27

M = Medal race; OCS = On course side of the starting line; DSQ = Disqualified; DNF = Did not finish; DNS= Did not start; RDG = Redress given

== Shooting ==
Lithuania has qualified a single shooter.

Women

Athlete	Event	Qualification		Final	
Athlete	Event	Points	Rank	Points	Rank
Daina Gudzinevičiūtė	Trap	55	14	Did not advance	

== Swimming ==
Lithuanian swimmers earned qualifying standards in the following events (up to a maximum of 2 swimmers in each event at the A-standard time, and 1 at the B-standard time): Vytautas Janušaitis became the first ever Lithuanian swimmer to reach an Olympic final in the men's 200 m individual medley, setting up a new Lithuanian record.

Men

Athlete	Event	Heat		Semifinal		Final	
Athlete	Event	Time	Rank	Time	Rank	Time	Rank
Paulius Andrijauskas	200 m butterfly	2:04.64	30	Did not advance			
Saulius Binevičius	200 m freestyle	1:50.50	21	Did not advance			
Edvinas Dautartas	200 m breaststroke	2:23.12	44	Did not advance			
Rolandas Gimbutis	50 m freestyle	22.59	21	Did not advance			
Rolandas Gimbutis	100 m freestyle	48.85 NR	=2 Q	49.75	14	Did not advance	
Darius Grigalionis	100 m backstroke	56.21	24	Did not advance			
Vytautas Janušaitis	200 m individual medley	2:01.32	8 Q	2:00.57 NR	3 Q	2:01.28	7
Vytautas Janušaitis	400 m individual medley	4:26.30	27	—N/a		Did not advance	
Rimvydas Šalčius	100 m butterfly	54.46	35	Did not advance			
Pavel Suškov	200 m backstroke	2:03.54	26	Did not advance			
Aurimas Valaitis	100 m breaststroke	1:04.11	38	Did not advance			
Saulius Binevičius; Rolandas Gimbutis; Vytautas Janušaitis; Paulius Viktoravičius	4 × 100 m freestyle relay	3:19.28	11	—N/a		Did not advance	

== Weightlifting ==
Lithuanian has qualified a single weightlifter.

Athlete	Event	Snatch		Clean & Jerk		Total	Rank
Athlete	Event	Result	Rank	Result	Rank	Total	Rank
Ramūnas Vyšniauskas	Men's −105 kg	187.5	7	222.5	=4	410	5

== Wrestling ==
Key:

- VT – Victory by Fall.
- PP – Decision by Points – the loser with technical points.
- PO – Decision by Points – the loser without technical points.

Men's Greco-Roman

Athlete	Event	Elimination Pool				Quarterfinal	Semifinal	Final / BM	
Athlete	Event	Opposition Result	Opposition Result	Opposition Result	Rank	Opposition Result	Opposition Result	Opposition Result	Rank
Svajūnas Adomaitis	−55 kg	Chochua (GEO); L 1–3 ^{PP}	Yıldız (TUR); L 1–3 ^{PP}	—N/a	3	Did not advance			16
Mindaugas Ežerskis	−96 kg	Sudureac (ROM); W 3–1 ^{PP}	Hashemzadeh (IRI); L 0–5 ^{VT}	—N/a	2	Did not advance			13
Mindaugas Mizgaitis	−120 kg	Gardner (USA); L 0–3 ^{PO}	Mikulski (POL); W 3–0 ^{PO}	Mureiko (BUL); L 1–3 ^{PP}	3	Did not advance			11

== See also ==
- Lithuania at the 2004 Summer Paralympics
