= Estonia at the 2012 Summer Olympics =

- IOC code: EST
- NOC: Estonian Olympic Committee
- Website: www.eok.ee (in Estonian)

in London
- Competitors: 32 in 11 sports
- Flag bearers: Aleksander Tammert (opening); Heiki Nabi (closing)
- Medals Ranked 63rd: Gold 0 Silver 1 Bronze 1 Total 2

Summer Olympics appearances (overview)
- 1920; 1924; 1928; 1932; 1936; 1948–1988; 1992; 1996; 2000; 2004; 2008; 2012; 2016; 2020; 2024

Other related appearances
- Russian Empire (1908–1912); Soviet Union (1952–1988)

Estonia competed at the 2012 Summer Olympics in London, United Kingdom from 27 July to 12 August 2012. This was the nation's eleventh appearance at the Summer Olympics.

The Estonian Olympic Committee sent the nation's smallest delegation to the Games in the post-Soviet era. A total of 32 athletes, 22 men and 10 women, competed in 11 sports. Fifteen athletes had competed in Beijing, including two Olympic medalists (rower and silver medalist Tõnu Endrekson, and defending champion Gerd Kanter in men's discus throw). Rifle shooter Anžela Voronova, at age 43, was the oldest athlete of the team, while double sculls rower Geir Suursild was the youngest at age 17. Former Olympic bronze medalist Aleksander Tammert, who competed at his fifth Olympics, became Estonia's flag bearer at the opening ceremony. Among the sports played by the athletes, Estonia marked its Olympic return in archery after twenty-year absence, and in wrestling after an eight-year absence.

Estonia left London with only two medals (one silver and one bronze), failing to win a gold medal for the second time since 2004. Defending champion Gerd Kanter settled for the bronze medal in men's discus throw, while Heiki Nabi won the nation's first ever Olympic silver medal in Greco-Roman wrestling 76 years after Kristjan Palusalu's gold medal at the 1936 Summer Olympics.

== Medalists ==
Medal	Name	Sport	Event	Date
Silver	Heiki Nabi	Wrestling	Men's Greco-Roman 120 kg	6 August
Bronze	Gerd Kanter	Athletics	Men's discus throw	7 August

Medals by sport
Sport	1st place, gold medalist(s)	2nd place, silver medalist(s)	3rd place, bronze medalist(s)	Total
Wrestling	0	1	0	1
Athletics	0	0	1	1
Total	0	1	1	2

== Archery ==
Estonia qualified 1 archer.

Athlete	Event	Ranking round		Round of 64	Round of 32	Round of 16	Quarterfinals	Semifinals	Final / BM	
Athlete	Event	Score	Seed	Opposition Score	Opposition Score	Opposition Score	Opposition Score	Opposition Score	Opposition Score	Rank
Reena Pärnat	Women's individual	621	52	Valencia (MEX) (13); L 1–7	Did not advance					

== Athletics ==
Estonian athletes achieved qualifying standards in the following athletics events (up to a maximum of 3 athletes in each event at the 'A' Standard, and 1 at the 'B' Standard):

Key

- Note – Ranks given for track events are within the athlete's heat only
- Q = Qualified for the next round
- q = Qualified for the next round as a fastest loser or, in field events, by position without achieving the qualifying target
- NR = National record
- N/A = Round not applicable for the event
- Bye = Athlete not required to compete in round

Men
Track & road events

Athlete	Event	Heat		Quarterfinal		Semifinal		Final	
Athlete	Event	Result	Rank	Result	Rank	Result	Rank	Result	Rank
Marek Niit	100 m	Bye		10.40	7	Did not advance			
Marek Niit	200 m	20.82	6	—N/a		Did not advance			
Rasmus Mägi	400 m hurdles	50.05	5	—N/a		Did not advance			

Field events

Athlete	Event	Qualification		Final	
Athlete	Event	Distance	Position	Distance	Position
Raigo Toompuu	Shot put	18.91	30	Did not advance	
Märt Israel	Discus throw	60.34	25	Did not advance	
Gerd Kanter	Discus throw	66.39	1 Q	68.03	3rd place, bronze medalist(s)
Aleksander Tammert	Discus throw	60.20	27	Did not advance	
Risto Mätas	Javelin throw	78.56	21	Did not advance	

Women
Track & road events

Athlete	Event	Final	
Athlete	Event	Result	Rank
Evelin Talts	Marathon	2:54:15	103

Field events

Athlete	Event	Qualification		Final	
Athlete	Event	Distance	Position	Distance	Position
Anna Iljuštšenko	High jump	1.90	15	Did not advance	

Combined events – Heptathlon

Athlete	Event	100H	HJ	SP	200 m	LJ	JT	800 m	Final	Rank
Grit Šadeiko	Result	13.50	1.74	12.43	24.25	6.11	44.12	2.23.01	6013	23
Grit Šadeiko	Points	1050	903	690	957	883	747	783	6013	23

== Badminton ==
Athlete	Event	Group Stage			Elimination	Quarterfinal	Semifinal	Final / BM	
Athlete	Event	Opposition Score	Opposition Score	Rank	Opposition Score	Opposition Score	Opposition Score	Opposition Score	Rank
Raul Must	Men's singles	Lahnsteiner (AUT); W 21–14, 21–18	Santoso (INA); L 12–21, 8–21	2	Did not advance				

== Cycling ==
=== Road ===
Athlete	Event	Time	Rank
Rene Mandri	Men's road race	5:46:37	50
Grete Treier	Women's road race	3:35:56	17

== Fencing ==
Men

Athlete	Event	Round of 32	Round of 16	Quarterfinal	Semifinal	Final / BM	
Athlete	Event	Opposition Score	Opposition Score	Opposition Score	Opposition Score	Opposition Score	Rank
Nikolai Novosjolov	Individual épée	Bye	Kelsey (USA); L 11–15	Did not advance			

== Judo ==
Athlete	Event	Round of 32	Round of 16	Quarterfinals	Semifinals	Repechage	Final / BM	
Athlete	Event	Opposition Result	Opposition Result	Opposition Result	Opposition Result	Opposition Result	Opposition Result	Rank
Martin Padar	Men's +100 kg	Brayson (CUB); L 0001–0100	Did not advance					

== Rowing ==
Men

Athlete	Event	Heats		Repechage		Semifinals		Final	
Athlete	Event	Time	Rank	Time	Rank	Time	Rank	Time	Rank
Geir Suursild; Jüri-Mikk Udam	Double sculls	6:33.88	4 R	6:38.50	4	Did not advance			
Tõnu Endrekson; Andrei Jämsä; Allar Raja; Kaspar Taimsoo	Quadruple sculls	5:42.87	2 SA/B	Bye		6.07.85	2 FA	5.46.96	4

Qualification Legend: FA=Final A (medal); FB=Final B (non-medal); FC=Final C (non-medal); FD=Final D (non-medal); FE=Final E (non-medal); FF=Final F (non-medal); SA/B=Semifinals A/B; SC/D=Semifinals C/D; SE/F=Semifinals E/F; QF=Quarterfinals; R=Repechage

== Sailing ==
Men

Athlete	Event	Race											Net points	Final rank
Athlete	Event	1	2	3	4	5	6	7	8	9	10	M*	Net points	Final rank
Johannes Ahun	RS:X	27	20	22	32; DPI	31	14	22	28	~~39~~; ~~DNF~~	35	EL	270	30
Karl-Martin Rammo	Laser	7	18	3	21	8	12	30	31	18	~~39~~	EL	187	18
Deniss Karpak	Finn	~~14~~	9	11	11	11	1	7	13	11	11	EL	99	11

Women

Athlete	Event	Race											Net points	Final rank
Athlete	Event	1	2	3	4	5	6	7	8	9	10	M*	Net points	Final rank
Ingrid Puusta	RS:X	15	20	6	15	14	~~21~~	15	12	20	17	EL	155	15
Anna Pohlak	Laser Radial	27	39	~~41~~	37	36	6	36	36	31	36	EL	325	35

M = Medal race; EL = Eliminated – did not advance into the medal race; DNF = Did not finish; DPI = Discretionary penalty imposed

== Shooting ==
Estonia qualified one quota place in the Women's 50 m rifle 3 position;

Women

Athlete	Event	Qualification		Final	
Athlete	Event	Points	Rank	Points	Rank
Anžela Voronova	50 m rifle 3 positions	576	31	Did not advance	
Anžela Voronova	10 m air rifle	395	42	Did not advance	

== Swimming ==
Men

Athlete	Event	Heat		Semifinal		Final	
Athlete	Event	Time	Rank	Time	Rank	Time	Rank
Martin Liivamägi	100 m breaststroke	1:01.57	29	Did not advance			
Martin Liivamägi	200 m individual medley	2:01.09	25	Did not advance			

Women

Athlete	Event	Heat		Semifinal		Final	
Athlete	Event	Time	Rank	Time	Rank	Time	Rank
Triin Aljand	50 m freestyle	25.33	19	Did not advance			
Triin Aljand	100 m butterfly	1:00.43	35	Did not advance			

== Wrestling ==
Estonia qualified in the following events.

Key:

- VT – Victory by Fall.
- PP – Decision by Points – the loser with technical points.
- PO – Decision by Points – the loser without technical points.

Men's Greco-Roman

Athlete	Event	Qualification	Round of 16	Quarterfinal	Semifinal	Repechage 1	Repechage 2	Final / BM	
Athlete	Event	Opposition Result	Opposition Result	Opposition Result	Opposition Result	Opposition Result	Opposition Result	Opposition Result	Rank
Ardo Arusaar	−96 kg	Caraballo (VEN); W 3–0 ^{PO}	Dzeinichenka (BLR); L 1–3 ^{PP}	Did not advance					8
Heiki Nabi	−120 kg	Bye	Chugoshvili (BLR); W 3–1 ^{PP}	Banak (POL); W 3–0 ^{PO}	Eurén (SWE); W 3–1 ^{PP}	Bye		López (CUB); L 0–3 ^{PO}	2nd place, silver medalist(s)
