= Milan Doleček =

Czech rower (born 1982)

Personal information
- Born: 18 March 1982 (age 44) Mělník, Czechoslovakia
- Height: 193 cm (6 ft 4 in)
- Weight: 99 kg (218 lb)
- Relatives: Milan Doleček (father)

Achievements and titles
- Olympic finals: 2004, 2008
Medal record
Men's rowing
Representing the Czech Republic
World Rowing Championships
Bronze medal – third place	2003 Milan	M2x
European Rowing Championships
Gold medal – first place	2007 Poznań	M8+
Bronze medal – third place	2010 Montemor-o-Velho	M4-
Bronze medal – third place	2012 Varese	M8+

Milan Doleček (born 18 March 1982) is a Czech rower. Along with Ondřej Synek he finished fifth in the men's double sculls at the 2004 Summer Olympics. At the 2008 Summer Olympics, he finished tenth in the men's quadruple sculls, along with Petr Vitásek, Jakub Hanák, and David Jirka.
