= Adrien Hardy =

French rower and Olympic gold medallist

Personal information
- Born: 30 July 1978 (age 47) Nîmes, France
Medal record
Men's rowing
Representing France
Olympic Games
Gold medal – first place	2004 Athens	Double sculls
World Rowing Championships
Gold medal – first place	2003 Milan	Double sculls
Gold medal – first place	2006 Eton	Double sculls
Silver medal – second place	2001 Lucerne	Double sculls
Silver medal – second place	2007 Munich	Double sculls
European Championships
Gold medal – first place	2008 Marathon	Eight
Bronze medal – third place	2009 Brest	Eight

Adrien Hardy (born 30 July 1978) is a French rower and Olympic gold medallist.

At Olympic level, in 2004, Hardy won the gold medal in the men's double sculls event, rowing with Sébastien Vieilledent. He also competed at the 2000 Olympics (with Frédéric Kowal), 2008 Olympics (with Jean-Baptiste Macquet) and, in the quadruple sculls event, at the 2012 Olympics (with Benjamin Chabanet, Matthieu Androdias and Pierre-Jean Peltier).

At world level he has won two gold medals in the double sculls, in 2003 (with Sébastien Vieilledent) and in 2006 (with Jean-Baptiste Macquet), and two silver medals, in 2001 (with Sébastien Vieilledent) and 2007 (with Jean-Baptiste Macquet).

At European level he has two medals, one gold and one bronze, in the men's eight event.
