= Bencsik =

Bencsik is a Hungarian surname. Notable people with the surname include:

- Gábor Bencsik (born 1980), Hungarian rower
- János Bencsik (born 1965), Hungarian politician
- Mária Bencsik (born 1939), Hungarian gymnast
