= Novikau =

Novikau is a Belarusian surname. Notable people with the surname include:

- Aliaksandr Novikau (born 1985), Belarusian rower
- Mikalai Novikau (born 1986), Belarusian weightlifter
- Siarhei Novikau (born 1982), Belarusian judoka
- Siarhei Novikau (born 1989), Belarusian boxer
- Yauheni Novikau (born 1996), Belarusian acrobatic gymnast
