= Sam Stitt =

American rower (born 1981)

Personal information
- Born: 28 September 1981 (age 43); Arlington County, Virginia, United States
- Home town: McLean, Virginia, United States

Sport
- Sport: Rowing

Sam Stitt (born September 28, 1981) is an American rower. He rowed for and graduated from McLean High School in McLean, Virginia before attending Rutgers University. He finished 5th in the men's quadruple sculls at the 2008 Summer Olympics.
