= Adam Wojciechowski (rower) =

Polish rower

Personal information
- Nationality: Polish
- Born: 23 June 1980 (age 46) Poznań, Poland

Sport
- Sport: Rowing

Adam Wojciechowski (born 23 June 1980) is a Polish rower. He competed in the men's double sculls event at the 2004 Summer Olympics.
