= Kirill Lemeshkevich =

Belarusian rower

Personal information
- Nationality: Belarusian
- Born: 12 May 1986 (age 38); Polotsk, Belarus

Sport
- Sport: Rowing

Kirill Lemeshkevich (born 12 May 1986) is a Belarusian rower. He competed in the men's quadruple sculls event at the 2008 Summer Olympics.
