= Jonathan Coeffic =

French rower (born 1981)

Medal record

Men's rowing

Representing France

Olympic Games
Bronze medal – third place	2008 Beijing	Quadruple sculls

World Championships
Silver medal – second place	2007 Munich	Quadruple sculls

Jonathan Coeffic (born 1 June 1981 in Villeurbanne) is a French rower. He competed at the 2008 Summer Olympics, where he won a bronze medal in quadruple skull.
