= Invercargill Rowing Club =

New Zealand rowing club

- Formation: 26 August 1875; 151 years ago
- Location: Ōreti River, New Zealand

The Invercargill Rowing Club is a New Zealand rowing club.

== History ==
The club was established on 26 August 1875, with clubrooms on the New River Estuary. In 1904, Mr. G.O. Joyce was its captain.

The club relocated to the Ōreti River in 1958. It is located adjacent to Southland's second large rowing club Waihopai. It expanded its facilities in 1983 when the first women members joined the club. An additional boat storage shed was built in 2005 given an increase in competition and training skiffs. It won the Rowing New Zealand Club of the Year award in 2007.

== Notable members ==
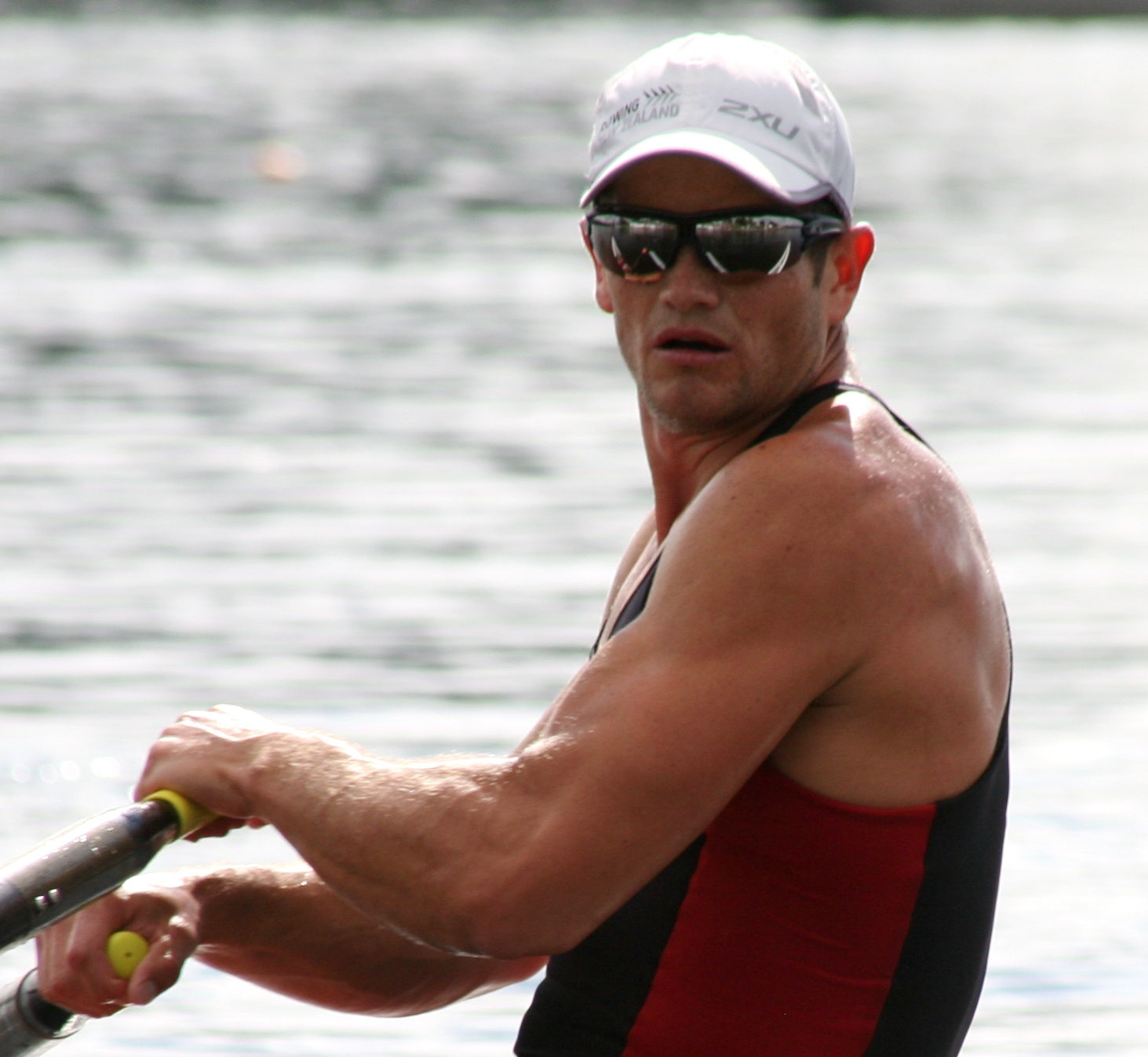
Nathan Cohen

- Nathan Cohen, rower, Olympic champion and two-time world champion
- Ian Hamilton, life member, rower, coach, administrator, and fundraiser
