= Konrad Wasielewski =

Polish rower

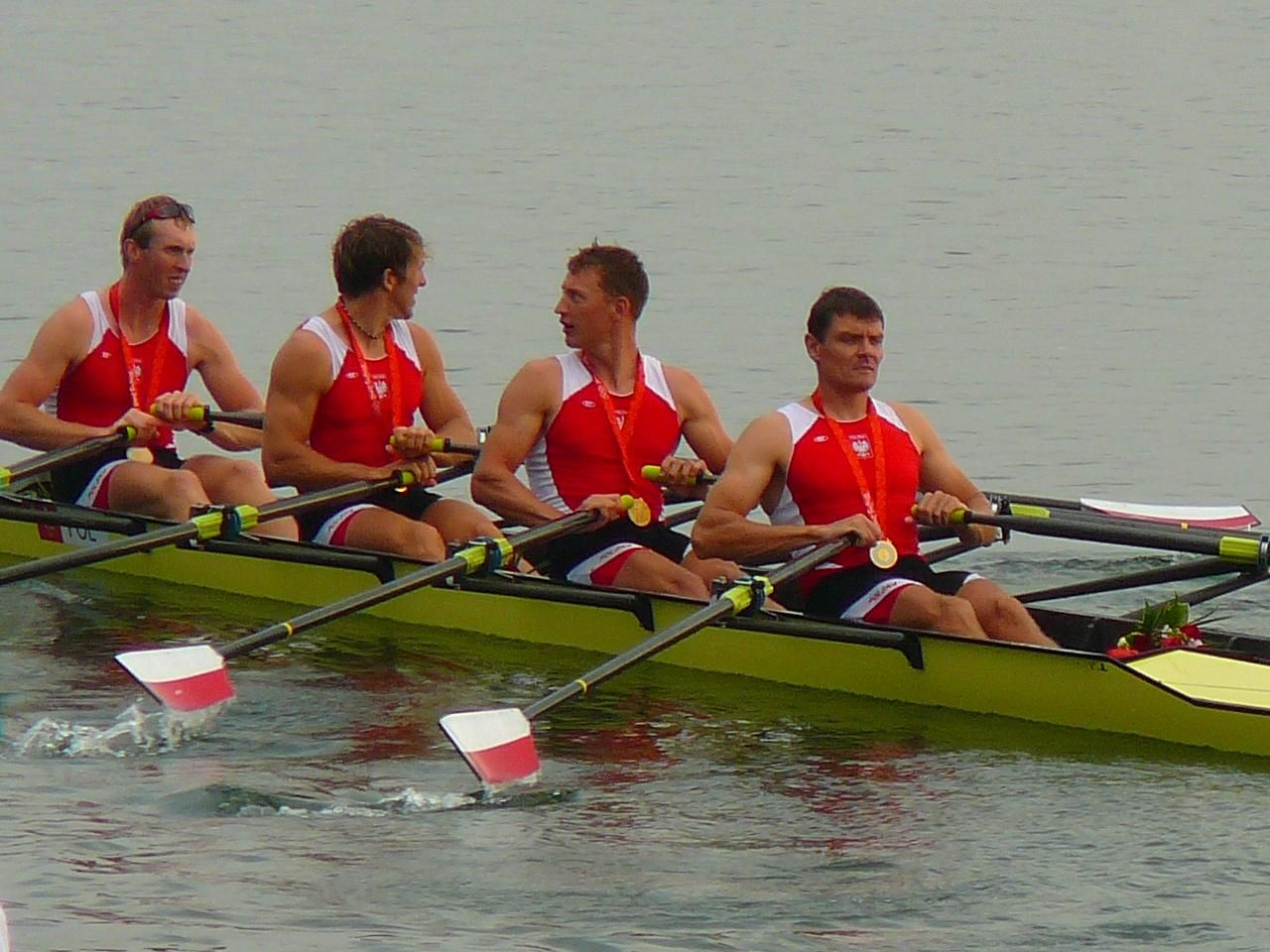
- Konrad Wasielewski (left), 2008

Personal information
- Born: 19 December 1984 (age 41)
Medal record
Men's rowing
Representing Poland
Olympic Games
Gold medal – first place	2008 Beijing	Quadruple sculls
World Rowing Championships
Gold medal – first place	2005 Gifu	Quadruple sculls
Gold medal – first place	2006 Eton	Quadruple sculls
Gold medal – first place	2007 Munich	Quadruple sculls
Gold medal – first place	2009 Poznan	Quadruple sculls
European Championships
Gold medal – first place	2010 Montemor-o-Velho	Quadruple sculls
Silver medal – second place	2013 Sevilla	Quadruple sculls

Konrad Henryk Wasielewski (born 19 December 1984 in Szczecin) is a Polish rower. He won a gold medal in quadruple sculls at the 2008 Summer Olympics.

For his sport achievements, he received:
Knight's Cross of the Order of Polonia Restituta (5th Class) in 2008.
