= Kevin Kowalyk =

Canadian rower

Kevin Kowalyk (born 27 September 1980 in Winnipeg, Manitoba) is a Canadian rower. He competed with Michael Braithwaite in the double sculls at the 2012 Summer Olympics, where they were eliminated in the semifinals.
