= Morten Adamsen =

Norwegian rower

Personal information
- Nationality: Norwegian
- Born: 10 September 1981 (age 43); Drammen, Norway

Sport
- Sport: Rowing

Morten Gundro Adamsen (born 10 September 1981) is a Norwegian competition rower. He was born in Drammen and represented Drammens RK. He competed at the 2004 Summer Olympics in Athens, where he placed seventh in double sculls, together with Nils-Torolv Simonsen.
