= Artem Morozov =

Ukrainian rower

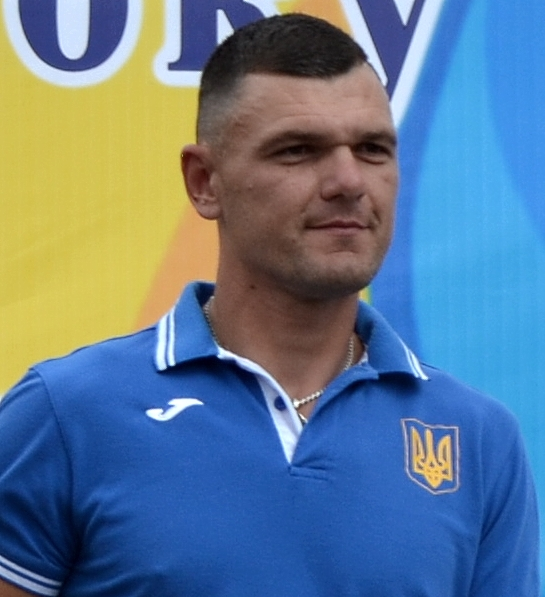

Personal information
- Born: 29 February 1980 (age 46) Kherson, Ukrainian SSR, Soviet Union
Medal record
Men's rowing
Representing Ukraine
World Championships
Gold medal – first place	2014 Amsterdam	M4x
European Championships
Gold medal – first place	2014 Belgrade	M4x
Bronze medal – third place	2008 Athens	M2x

Artem Mykolaiovych Morozov (Ukrainian: Артем Миколайович Морозов; born 29 February 1980) is a Ukrainian rower. He competed in the double sculls at the 2012 Summer Olympics. He won the gold medal in the quadruple sculls at the 2014 World Rowing Championships in Amsterdam.
