= Jamie Schroeder =

American rower

Jamie Twist Schroeder
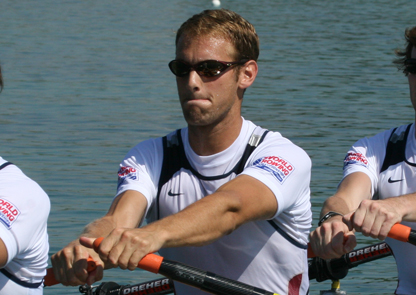

Personal information
- Full name: Jamie Twist Schroeder
- Born: 9 September 1981 (age 45) Wilmette, Illinois, United States
- Height: 2.03 m (6 ft 8 in)
- Weight: 104 kg (229 lb; 16.4 st)
Medal record
Rowing
Representing United States
Pan American Games
| Bronze medal – third place | 2007 Rio de Janeiro | Quadruple sculls |

Jamie Twist Schroeder (born September 9, 1981, in Wilmette, Illinois) is an American rower, and a victorious Oxford Blue.

== Education ==
Schroeder was educated at Choate Rosemary Hall, Connecticut '99, and Stanford University '05 from where he has a BSc in biology and an MSc in bioengineering. He originally enrolled at Northwestern University, where he began rowing in 2001 before transferring to Stanford. He matriculated in 2005 at Christ Church, Oxford where he studied cardiac energetics and earned a doctoral degree in 2010 from the Department of Physiology, Anatomy, and Genetics.

== The Boat Race ==
At Oxford University, Schroeder was a member of Oxford University Boat Club and took part in the Boat Race in 2006. Both universities had extremely strong intakes that year, with Cambridge boasting several world champions and the Oxford crew including Olympic silver medallists Barney Williams and Jake Wetzel. Oxford, with Schroeder in the five seat, won the epic contest by 5 lengths in a time of 18 minutes 26 seconds.

== International rowing career ==
Schroeder won his first senior international vest in 2003 sitting in the three seat of the United States Coxless Four, which came 7th at the World Championships in Seville. She occupied the two seat a year later when the Four came 10th at the Olympics in Athens. After taking a break from international rowing, Schroeder competed in the single scull at the World Championships at Dorney Lake, Eton, finishing 12th. In preparation for the 2008 Beijing Olympics, the US quadruple scull first competed in the 2008 World Cup in Lucerne, Switzerland. The quad, with Schroeder in the three seat, overcame the 3-year undefeated World Champion Polish quad to win a gold medal, marking the first time the US has had international success in the quadruple sculls event. Keeping the same lineup from the gold-medal World Cup boat, Schroeder and teammates Scott Gault, Sam Stitt, and Matt Hughes went on to place 5th at the 2008 Beijing Olympics later in the summer.

== Achievements ==
=== Olympics ===
- 2008 Beijing - 5th, Quad Scull (three)
- 2004 Athens - 10th, Coxless Four (two)

=== World Championships ===
- 2007 Munich - 9th, Quad Scull (three)
- 2006 Eton - 12th, Single Scull
- 2003 Milan - 7th, Coxless Four (three)

=== World Cup ===
- 2008 Lucerne - GOLD, Quad Scull (three)

== Other rowing ==
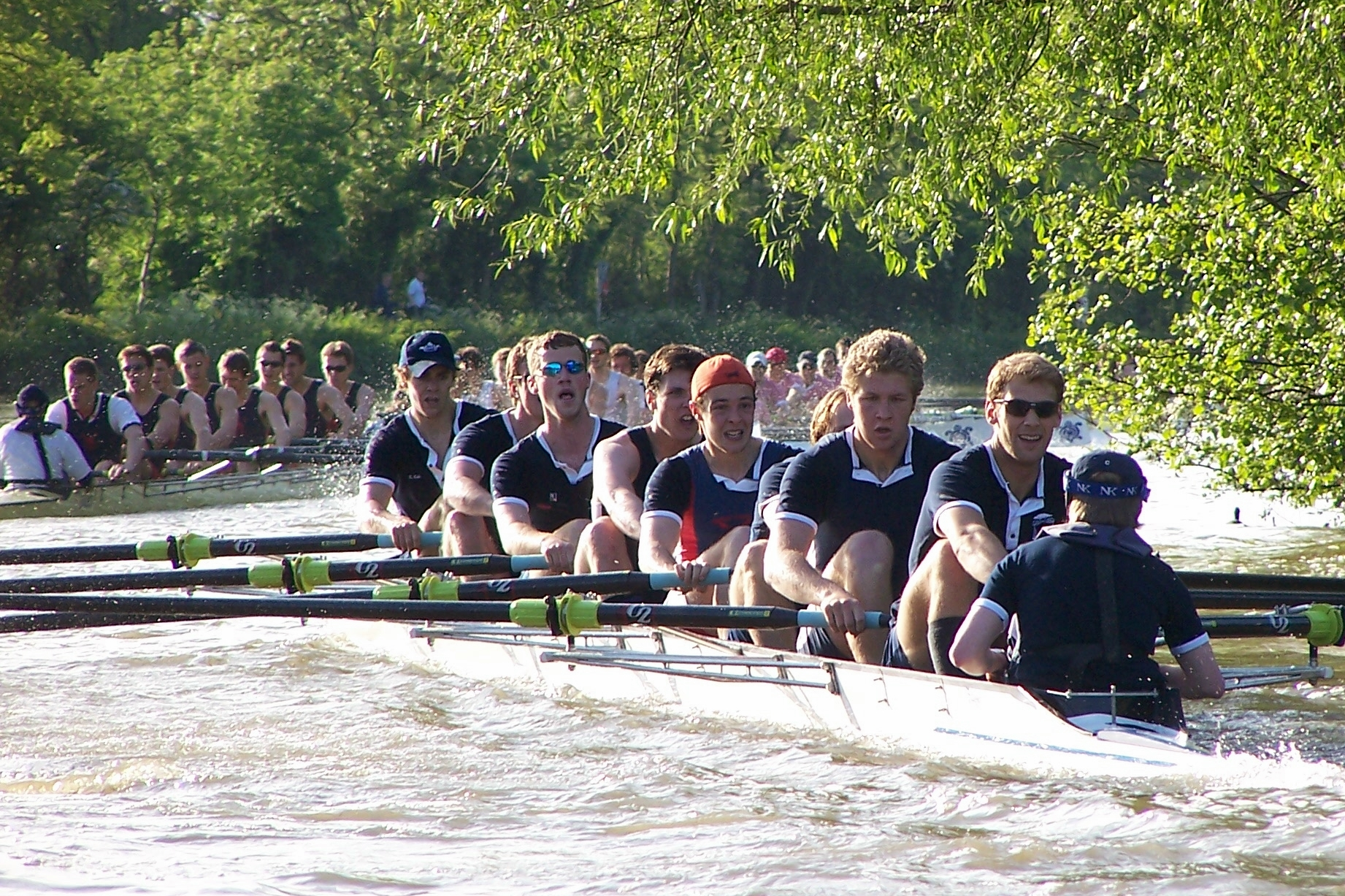
Christ Church Men's 1st VIII 2006 with Jamie Schroeder at stroke

In the summers of 2006 and 2009, Schroeder competed for Christ Church in one of Oxford's annual inter-collegiate competitions, Summer Eights. In 2006, Christ Church - stroked by Schroeder - rose one place in the bumps charts to fourth. In 2009, the crew, with Schroeder at five, started third, but "bumped" on the first two days of the competition, and finished "Head of the River" for the first time since 1985.
