= Eric Knittel =

German rower (born 1983)

Medal record

Men's rowing

Representing Germany

World Championships
Gold medal – first place	2009 Poznań	Double scull

European Championships
Bronze medal – third place	2007 Poznań	Double scull

Eric Knittel (born 20 April 1983, in Berlin) is a German rower.

Knittel won the gold medal in the 2009 Rowing World Cup at Lucerne in the men's double sculls with Stephan Krüger. He also teamed with him at the 2012 Summer Olympics.

Knittel is a member of the Berlin Rowing Club.
