= Sébastien Vieilledent =

French rower (born 1976)

Medal record

Men's rowing

Representing France

Olympic Games
Gold medal – first place	2004 Athens	Double sculls

Sébastien Vieilledent (born 26 August 1976 in Cannes, Alpes-Maritimes) is a 2004 French rowing gold medallist. He won the gold medal alongside Adrien Hardy. He is currently coaching the French women's Olympic team.
