= Michael Braithwaite =

Canadian rower (born 1987)

Personal information
- Born: 2 March 1987 (age 38); Duncan, British Columbia, Canada

Sport
- Country: Canada
- Sport: Rowing

Michael Braithwaite (born 2 March 1987 in Duncan, British Columbia) is a Canadian rower. He competed with Kevin Kowalyk in the double sculls at the 2012 Summer Olympics and they were eliminated in the semifinal, going on to place 6th in the B Final (12th overall).
