= Marek Kolbowicz =

Polish rower

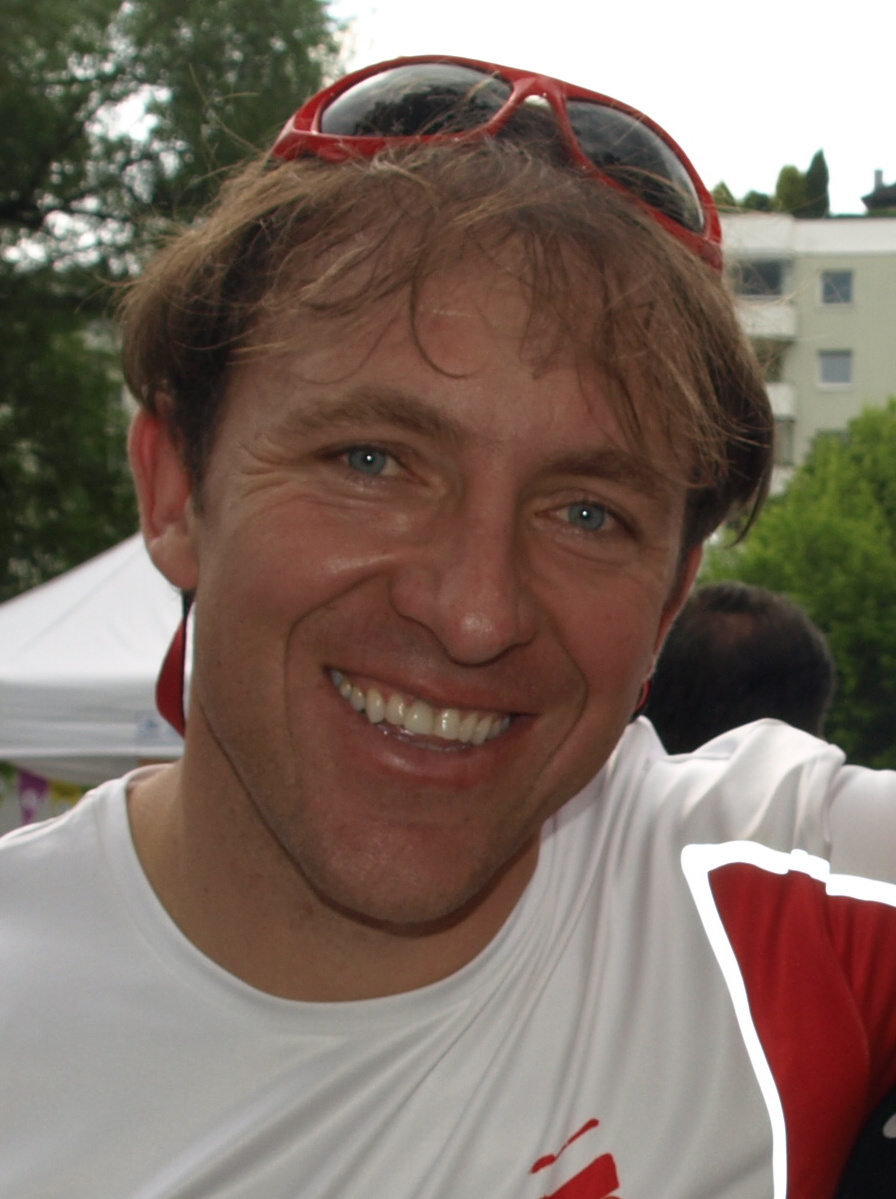
- Kolbowicz in 2013

Personal information
- Full name: Marek Antoni Kolbowicz
- Born: 11 June 1971 (age 55) Szczecin, Poland
Medal record
Men's rowing
Representing Poland
Olympic Games
Gold medal – first place	2008 Beijing	Quad sculls
World Championships
Gold medal – first place	2005 Gifu	Quad sculls
Gold medal – first place	2006 Eton	Quad sculls
Gold medal – first place	2007 Munich	Quad sculls
Gold medal – first place	2009 Poznan	Quad sculls
Silver medal – second place	2002 Seville	Quad sculls
Bronze medal – third place	1998 Cologne	Double sculls
Bronze medal – third place	2003 Milan	Quad sculls
European Championships
Gold medal – first place	2010 Montemor-o-Velho	Quad sculls
Summer Universiade
Bronze medal – third place	1993 Buffalo	Quad sculls

Marek Antoni Kolbowicz (born 11 June 1971) is a Polish rower. He won a gold medal in quadruple sculls at the 2008 Summer Olympics and was world champion in 2005, 2006 and 2007.

For his sport achievements, he received:
Knight's Cross of the Order of Polonia Restituta (5th Class) in 2008.
