= Igor Salov =

Russian rower

Igor Nikolayevich Salov (Russian: Игорь Николаевич Салов; born 24 March 1983, in Rostov-on-Don) is a Russian rower. He finished 7th in the men's quadruple sculls at the 2008 Summer Olympics.
