= Volodymyr Pavlovskyy =

Ukrainian rower (born 1980)

Medal record

Men's rowing

Representing Ukraine

World Rowing Championships
Silver medal – second place	2006 Eton	Quadruple sculls

European Championships
Bronze medal – third place	2008 Marathon	Quadruple sculls

Volodymyr Pavlovsky (Ukrainian: Володимир Станіславович Павловський; born 14 April 1980 in Kiev) is a Ukrainian rower who competes in the men's quadruple sculls. He has competed at two Olympics and eight world championships, winning the silver medal in 2006, in a team with Dymtro Prokopenko, Sergiy Bilouschenko and Sergii Gryn.
