= Janez Jurše =

Slovenian rower

Personal information
- Nationality: Slovenian
- Born: 15 April 1989 (age 36) Maribor, Yugoslavia

Sport
- Sport: Rowing

Janez Jurše (born 15 April 1989) is a Slovenian rower. He competed in the men's quadruple sculls event at the 2008 Summer Olympics.
