= Gábor Bencsik =

Hungarian rower

Personal information
- Nationality: Hungarian
- Born: 15 July 1980 (age 44); Mohács, Hungary

Sport
- Sport: Rowing

Gábor Bencsik (born 15 July 1980) is a Hungarian rower. He competed in the men's double sculls event at the 2004 Summer Olympics.
