= Geir Suursild =

Estonian rower

Personal information
- Nationality: Estonian
- Born: 13 October 1994 (age 31) Pärnu, Estonia

Sport
- Sport: Rowing

Geir Suursild (born 13 October 1994) is an Estonian rower. He competed in the men's double sculls event at the 2012 Summer Olympics.
