= Einaras Šiaudvytis =

Lithuanian rower (born 1977)

Personal information
- Full name: Einaras Šiaudvytis
- Nationality: Lithuania
- Born: 1 November 1977 (age 48) Šilutė, Lithuanian SSR, Soviet Union
- Height: 1.92 m (6 ft 3 1/2 in)
- Weight: 88 kg (194 lb)

Sport
- Sport: Rowing
- Club: Klaipėda IC

Einaras Šiaudvytis (born 1 November 1977 in Šilutė) is a Lithuanian rower. He represented his nation Lithuania, along with his double sculls partner Kęstutis Keblys, at the 2004 Summer Olympics, and has attained a fifth-place finish (6:29.790) at the second leg of the 2002 World Rowing Cup in Milan, Italy. Siaudvytis is also a full-fledged member throughout most of his sporting career for Klaipėda Rowing Club (Lithuanian: Klaipėdos irklavimo centras).

Siaudvytis qualified for the Lithuanian squad in the men's double sculls at the 2004 Summer Olympics in Athens by finishing fifth in the B-final and eleventh overall from the 2003 World Rowing Championships in Milan, Italy with an entry time of 6:28.380. Teaming with his partner Kęstutis Keblys throughout the series, the Lithuanian duo paddled their lifetime best of 6:24.56 for a fifth-place effort in a single repechage round, but failed to advance into the semifinals with only top three boats moving forward. Earlier in the prelims, Keblys and Siaudvytis trailed behind the other three boats in heat three by a wide, nine-second gap with a fourth-place time in 7:07.13.
