= Michał Jeliński =

Polish rower (born 1980)

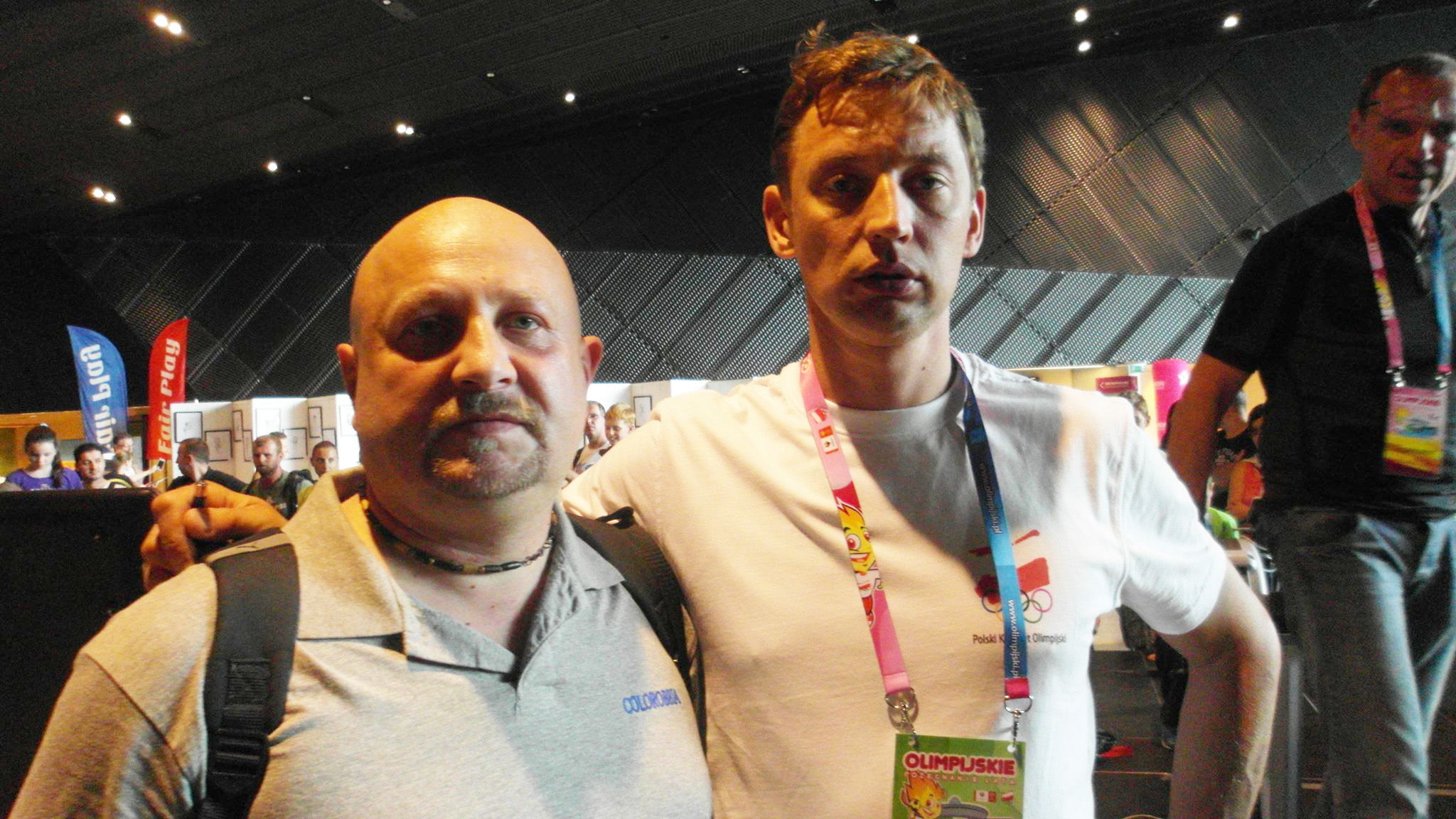

Personal information
- Born: 17 March 1980 (age 46)
Medal record
Men's rowing
Representing Poland
Olympic Games
Gold medal – first place	2008 Beijing	Quadruple sculls
World Rowing Championships
Gold medal – first place	2005 Gifu	Quadruple sculls
Gold medal – first place	2006 Eton	Quadruple sculls
Gold medal – first place	2007 Munich	Quadruple sculls
Gold medal – first place	2009 Poznan	Quadruple sculls
European Championships
Gold medal – first place	2010 Montemor-o-Velho	Quadruple sculls

Michał Jliński (born 17 March 1980, in Gorzów Wielkopolski) is a Polish rower. He won a gold medal in quadruple sculls at the 2008 Summer Olympics.

For his sporting achievements, he received the Knight's Cross of the Order of Polonia Restituta in 2008.
