= Gašper Fistravec =

Slovenian rower

Personal information
- Nationality: Slovenian
- Born: 27 January 1987 (age 38); Maribor, Yugoslavia

Sport
- Sport: Rowing

Gašper Fistravec (born 27 January 1987) is a Slovenian rower. He competed in the men's quadruple sculls event at the 2008 Summer Olympics.
