= Cédric Berrest =

French rower (born 1985)

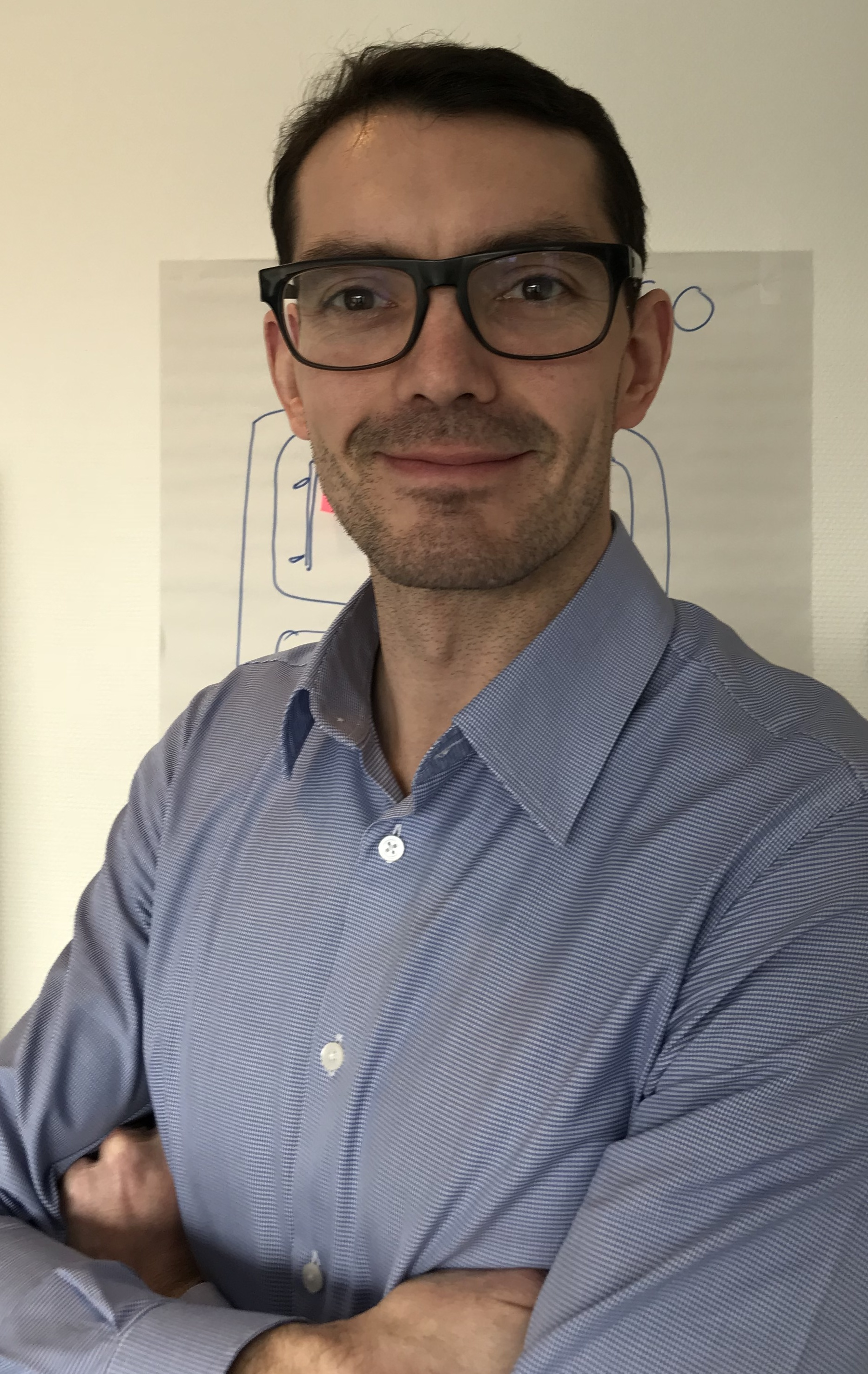
- Berrest in 2018

Medal record

Men's rowing

Representing France

Olympic Games
Bronze medal – third place	2008 Beijing	M4x

World Championships
Silver medal – second place	2007 Munich	M4x
Silver medal – second place	2009 Poznan	M2x
Bronze medal – third place	2010 Hamilton	M2x
Bronze medal – third place	2011 Bled	M2x

European Championships
Gold medal – first place	2010 Montemor-o-Velho	M2x

Cédric Jacques Henri Berrest (born 2 April 1985 in Toulouse) is a French rower. He competed at the 2008 Summer Olympics, where he won a bronze medal in quadruple scull. Many times French champion in single scull, Cédric Berrest scored the best time at the 2009 CRASH-B of Boston, a world erg competition. The athlete is still very present in the rowing world, strongly scoring great times on his single scull and erg competition. Cédric now rows at Toulouse and is still in the French team A.
