= Aleksandr Novikov (rower) =

Belarusian rower

Personal information
- Nationality: Belarusian
- Born: 30 October 1985 (age 39); Minsk, Belarus

Sport
- Sport: Rowing

Aleksandr Novikov (born 30 October 1985) is a Belarusian rower. He competed in the men's quadruple sculls event at the 2008 Summer Olympics.
