= Jernej Jurše =

Slovenian rower

Personal information
- Nationality: Slovenian
- Born: 22 September 1987 (age 37); Maribor, Yugoslavia

Sport
- Sport: Rowing

Jernej Jurše (born 22 September 1987) is a Slovenian rower. He competed in the men's quadruple sculls event at the 2008 Summer Olympics.
