= Brendan Long =

Australian rower

Personal information
- Born: 24 November 1979
- Years active: 1999–2009

Sport
- Sport: Rowing
- Club: Tamar Club

Achievements and titles
- National finals: President's Cup 1999-08; King's Cup 2005-08; AustChamp4X 01,04,08,09; AustChamp2X 05,06,08,09

Brendan Long (born 24 November 1979 in Launceston, Tasmania) is an Australian former representative rower. He twice represented at World Rowing Championships in a quad scull, is a dual Olympian and an Olympic record holder. He was an eight time Australian national champion in sculling boats and contested the national championship in the men's double scull every year from 1999 to 2009, winning that particular title on four occasions.

== Club and state rowing ==
Long's senior rowing was from the Tamar Rowing Club in Launceston.

In Tamar colours he competed at the Australian Rowing Championships for eleven consecutive years from 1999 to 2009, each time in at least two boat classes. He raced for the double scull national title at each of these regattas winning that championship in 2005, 2006, 2008 and 2009. He contested the quad scull national title at ten of those championships, was victorious in 2001, 2004, 2008 and 2009 and took the silver medal in 2003. On eight occasions between 2001 and 2009 he also contested the Australian single sculls championship.

Long was first selected to represent Tasmania in the men's youth eight which contested the Noel F Wilkinson Trophy in the Interstate Regatta within the 1998 Australian Rowing Championships. In 1999 he was the Tasmanian single sculler selected to race for the President's Cup at the Interstate Regatta. He won the silver medal for Tasmania in that same event three times from 2001 to 2003 and contested it again in 2004, 2007 and 2008. From 2005 to 2008 he also rowed in the Tasmanian men's eight racing for the King's Cup at the Interstate Regatta. In 2008 he stroked that Tasmanian eight.

== International representative career ==
Long first represented for Australia at the 1999 World Rowing U23 Championships in Hamburg in a quad scull which finished in overall fourth place. He was selected in the Australian senior squad in 2001 and raced at a World Rowing Cup and at the 2001 World Rowing Championships in Lucerne to a tenth placing. He returned to the Australian quad in 2003 racing at the WRC III and then at the 2003 World Championships where they finished in fourth place.

For the 2004 Athen Olympics Long was selected to row Australia's double scull with Peter Hardcastle. Their third place in the heats qualified then for the semi-finals they did not make the A final and finished overall twelfth.

It was late in the next Olympiad when Long returned to the Australian representative squad. He was selected to the quad scull in time for their Olympic build-up at two WRC's in May 2008 and held his seat for the Beijing 2008 Olympics where Long and the Australian quad set a world record for the men's quadruple sculls in their heat. That time of 5:36.20 stood as the Olympic best time until the 2020 Tokyo Olympics. In the Olympic final however they narrowly missed a medal and finished fourth. It was Long's final Australian representative row.
