= Matt Hughes (rower) =

American rower

Matthew Hughes (born October 2, 1981, in Ludington, Michigan) is an American rower. He competed in the 2008 Olympics in men's quadruple sculls as bow seat. Currently holding the 2K ergometer record at the University of Michigan Men's Rowing Team Team, it is rumored that he ate 4 Big Macs before setting this record. Hughes graduated from the University of Michigan in 2004.

Height: 5' 8"

Weight: 218.3 pounds
