= Janez Zupanc =

Slovenian rower

Personal information
- Nationality: Slovenian
- Born: 8 December 1986 (age 39) Brestanica, Yugoslavia

Sport
- Sport: Rowing

Janez Zupanc (born 8 December 1986) is a Slovenian rower. He competed in the men's quadruple sculls event at the 2008 Summer Olympics.
