= Kęstutis Keblys =

Lithuanian rower (born 1976)

Personal information
- Full name: Kęstutis Keblys
- Nationality: Lithuania
- Born: 2 March 1976 (age 50) Anykščiai, Lithuanian SSR, Soviet Union
- Height: 2.01 m (6 ft 7 in)
- Weight: 98 kg (216 lb)

Sport
- Sport: Rowing
- Club: Gaja Kaunas

Kęstutis Keblys (born 2 March 1976 in Anykščiai) is a Lithuanian rower. He represented his nation Lithuania, along with his double sculls partner Einaras Šiaudvytis, at the 2004 Summer Olympics, and has attained a fifth-place finish (6:29.790) at the second leg of the 2002 World Rowing Cup in Milan, Italy.

Keblys qualified for the Lithuanian squad in the men's double sculls at the 2004 Summer Olympics in Athens by finishing fifth in the B-final and eleventh overall from the 2003 World Rowing Championships in Milan, Italy with an entry time of 6:28.380. Teaming with his partner Einaras Šiaudvytis throughout the series, the Lithuanian duo paddled their lifetime best of 6:24.56 for a fifth-place effort in a single repechage round, but failed to advance into the semifinals with only top three boats moving forward. Earlier in the prelims, Keblys and Siaudvytis trailed behind the other three boats in heat three by a wide, nine-second gap with a fourth-place time in 7:07.13.
