= Pierre-Jean Peltier =

French rower

Olympic medal record

Men's rowing

Representing France

Olympic Games
Bronze medal – third place	2008 Beijing	Quadruple sculls

European Championships
Gold medal – first place	2008 Marathon	Eights
Bronze medal – third place	2009 Brest	Eights

Pierre-Jean Peltier (born 20 May 1984 in Pont-à-Mousson) is a French rower. He competed at the 2008 Summer Olympics, where he won a bronze medal in quadruple sculls.
