= Petr Vitásek =

Czech rower

Medal record

Men's rowing

Representing Czech Republic

World Rowing Championships
Silver medal – second place	2003 Milan	M4x

Petr Vitásek (born 5 August 1981 in Ostrava) is a Czech rower.
