= Romano Battisti =

Italian yachtsman and former rower

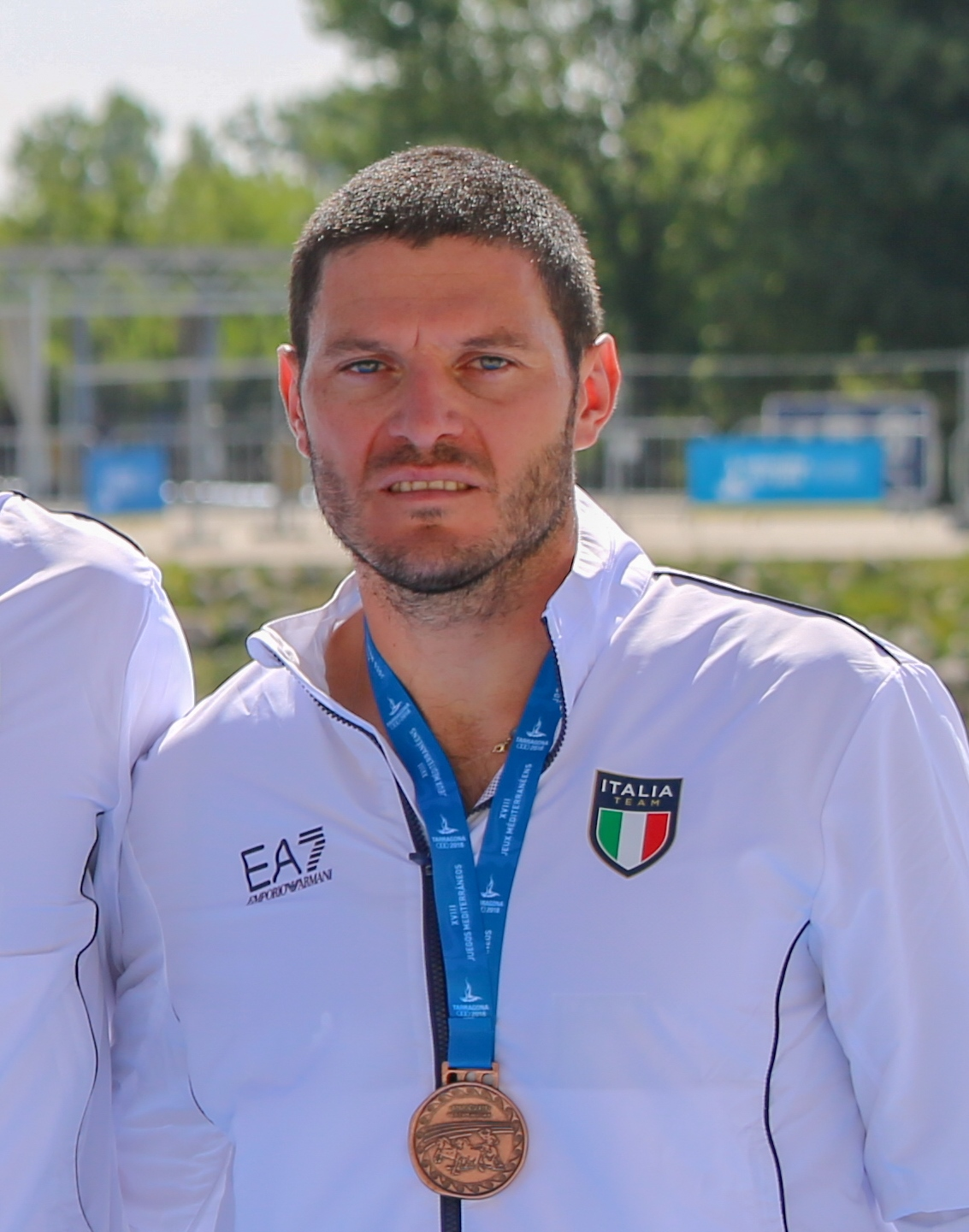

Personal information
- National team: Italy
- Born: 21 August 1986 (age 39) Priverno, Italy
- Height: 1.90 m (6 ft 3 in)
- Weight: 92 kg (203 lb)

Sport
- Country: Italy
- Sport: Rowing
- Club: Fiamme Gialle
Medal record
Event	1st	2nd	3rd
Olympic Games	0	1	0
World Championships	0	1	1
European Championships	1	1	1
Mediterranean Games	1	0	2
Total	2	3	4
Olympic Games
Silver medal – second place	2012 London	Double sculls
World Championships
Silver medal – second place	2014 Amsterdam	Double sculls
Bronze medal – third place	2013 Chungju	Double sculls
Mediterranean Games
Bronze medal – third place	2009 Pescara	Single sculls
Gold medal – first place	2013 Mersin	Double sculls
Bronze medal – third place	2018 Tarragona	Double sculls

Romano Battisti (born 21 August 1986) is an Italian yachtsman and former rower, who won silver medal in double sculls at the 2012 Summer Olympics, with Alessio Sartori.

== Biography ==
Paired with Francesco Fossi at the 2016 Rio Olympics, he came in fourth.

In 2019 Battisti faces another big bet, it is selected for the Luna Rossa team that will participate in the 2021 America's Cup in New Zealand.

== Achievements ==
Year	Competition	Venue	Position	Event	Notes
2012	Olympic Games	(United Kingdom) London	2nd	Double sculls	
2012	European Championships	(Italy) Varese	2nd	Double sculls	
2013	European Championships	(Spain) Seville	1st	Double sculls	
2013	World Championships	(South Korea) Chungju	3rd	Double sculls	
2014	World Championships	(Netherlands) Amsterdam	2nd	Double sculls	
2017	European Championships	(Czech Republic) Račice	3rd	Double sculls	
