= Stephan Krüger =

German rower (born 1988)

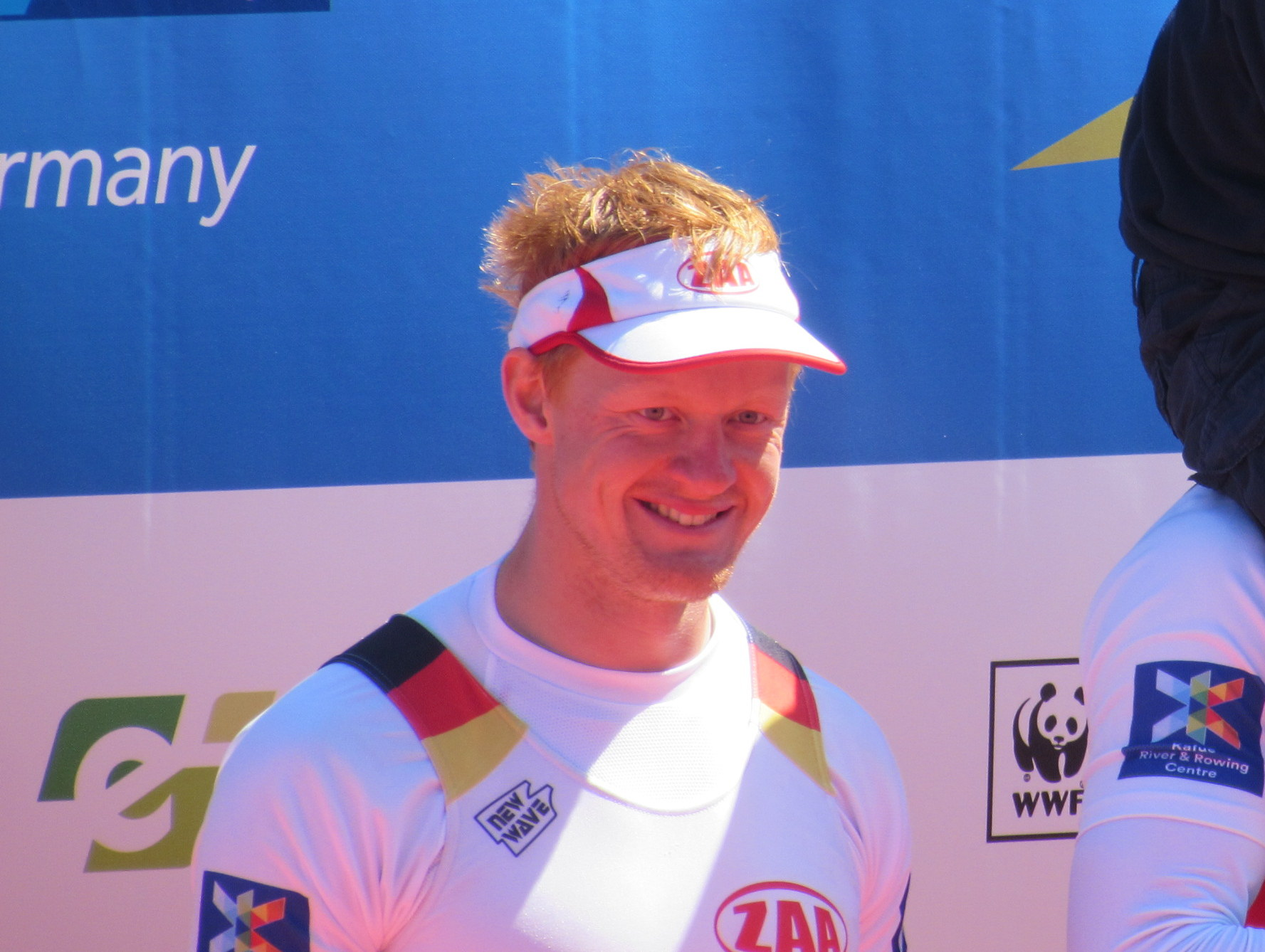

Personal information
- Born: 29 November 1988 (age 37) Rostock, East Germany
Medal record
Men's rowing
Representing Germany
World Rowing Championships
Gold medal – first place	2009 Poznań	M2x
Silver medal – second place	2011 Bled	M2x
European Championships
Gold medal – first place	2015 Poznan	M2x
Silver medal – second place	2016 Brandenburg	M2x
Bronze medal – third place	2014 Belgrade	M2x

Stephan Krüger (born 29 November 1988, Rostock) is a German rower.

He was part of the German quadruple sculls team at the 2008 Summer Olympics, with René Bertram, Hans Gruhne and Christian Schreiber. The team finished in 6th.

In 2009, he won the gold medal in the men's double sculls with Eric Knittel at the 2009 World Championships.

In 2011, Krüger and Gruhne won silver in the men's double sculls at the World Championships in Bled.

At the 2012 Summer Olympics, he competed in the men's double sculls with Eric Knittel, finishing in 9th.

At the 2016 Summer Olympics in Rio de Janeiro, he competed in men's double sculls with teammate Marcel Hacker. They finished in 8th place. Hacker and Krüger had won silver in the event at the 2016 European Championships on home water in Brandenburg, after winning the event at the 2015 European Championships. Krüger had also won bronze in the event with Gruhne in 2014.
