= Luka Špik =

Slovenian rower

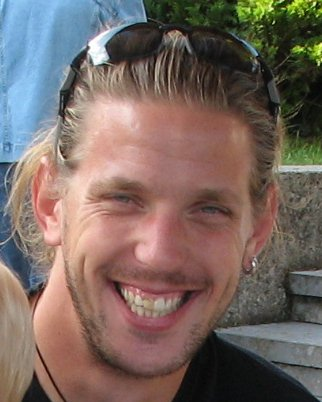

Personal information
- Born: 9 February 1979 (age 47) Kranj, SR Slovenia
Medal record
Men's rowing
Representing Slovenia
Olympic Games
Gold medal – first place	2000 Sydney	Double sculls
Silver medal – second place	2004 Athens	Double sculls
Bronze medal – third place	2012 London	Double sculls
World Championships
Gold medal – first place	1999 St. Catharines	Double sculls
Gold medal – first place	2005 Gifu	Double sculls
Gold medal – first place	2007 Munich	Double sculls
Silver medal – second place	2005 Gifu	Quadruple sculls
Silver medal – second place	2006 Eton	Double sculls

Luka Špik (born 9 February 1979 in Kranj, SR Slovenia) is a Slovenian rower and Olympic gold medalist.

At the 2005 World Championship, he won gold in the Double Sculls event together with Iztok Čop and silver in the Quadruple Sculls with Iztok Čop, Matej Prelog and Davor Mizerit.

He also won the 2007 World Championships in M2X.

Špik and Iztok Čop won the 1999 World Championship, and also the gold at the 2000 Sydney Olympics, which was the first Olympic gold medal for independent Slovenia.

Špik and Čop were the favourites to repeat the victory in men's double sculls at the 2004 Summer Olympics, but finished in silver medal position.

Coming into the 2012 Summer Olympics they were not the favourites, however with a strong performance in the semi-finals they announced they could be in the running for a medal. In the final of the Men's double sculls after taking an early lead and holding it until nearly the 1500 m mark, they lost the lead to the Italians and the later winners from New Zealand. They finished in the third position, giving Slovenia the second medal of the Olympics after Urška Žolnir won gold 2 days earlier.

== Achievements ==
Olympic Games

- 2000: Sydney (AUS) – 1st place (double scull with Iztok Cop)
- 2004: Athens (GRE) – 2nd place (double scull with Iztok Cop)
- 2012: London (GBR) – 3rd place (double scull with Iztok Čop)
- 2008: Beijing (CHN) – 6th place (double scull with Iztok Cop)

Junior World Championships

- 1998: Ioannina (GRE)-1st place (single scull)
- 1997:Hazewinkel (BEL)-1st place (single scull)
- 1995:Poznań (POL)-2nd place (single scull)
- 1994:Munich (GER)-6th place single scull)

World Championships:

- 2007: Munich (GER) – 1st place (double scull)
- 2006: Eton (GBR) – 2nd place (double scull)
- 2005: Gifu (JPN) – 1st place (double scull), 2nd place (quadruple scull)
- 2003: Milan (ITA)-4th place (double scull with Prelog)
- 2002: Seville (ESP)-8th place (4x; Novak, Sracnjek, Bozic)
- 2001: Luzern (CH)-5th place (double scull with MIzerit)
- 1999: St. Catharines (CAN)-1st place (double scull with Iztok Cop)
