= René Bertram =

German rower

Medal record

Men's rowing

Representing Germany

World Rowing Championships
Gold medal – first place	2002 Seville	M4x
Bronze medal – third place	2007 Munich	M4x

Rene Bertram (born 21 July 1981 in Magdeburg) is a German rower.
