= Christian Schreiber (rower) =

German rower (born 1980)

Medal record

Men's rowing

Representing Germany

World Rowing Championships
Gold medal – first place	2001 Lucerne	M4x
Bronze medal – third place	2005 Gifu	M2x

Christian Schreiber (born 7 August 1980 in Weissenfels) is a German rower.
