= Blyde =

Blyde may refer to:

== People ==
- Blyde Smit (born 1995), South African actress and production designer
- Cherry Blyde (born 1966), New Zealand rugby union player and administrator
- Liam Blyde (born 1997), New Zealand rugby union player
- Michaela Blyde (born 1995), New Zealand rugby sevens player

== Places ==
- Blyde River, South Africa
- Blyde River Canyon, South Africa
- Blyde River Canyon Nature Reserve, South Africa

== Other uses ==
- Blyde River Bunters, South African field hockey club
- Blyde River flat gecko (also known as Afroedura rondavelica), species of African geckos
- Blyde-Olifants Conservancy, South African game farm group
- Blyde Sugarbush (also known as Protea laetans), flowering plant in the family Proteaceae
