= Nicholas Hudson =

Nicholas Hudson may refer to:

- Nicholas Hudson (bishop) (born 1959), English (Roman Catholic) Bishop of Plymouth
- Nicholas Hudson (athlete) (born 1972), Australian 800m runner
- Nicholas Hudson (publisher) (1933–2018), in Victoria, Australia
- Nicholas Hudson, a fictional character in Another World

== See also ==
- Nick Hudson (disambiguation)
