= Tom Murray (New Zealand rower) =

New Zealand rower (born 1994)

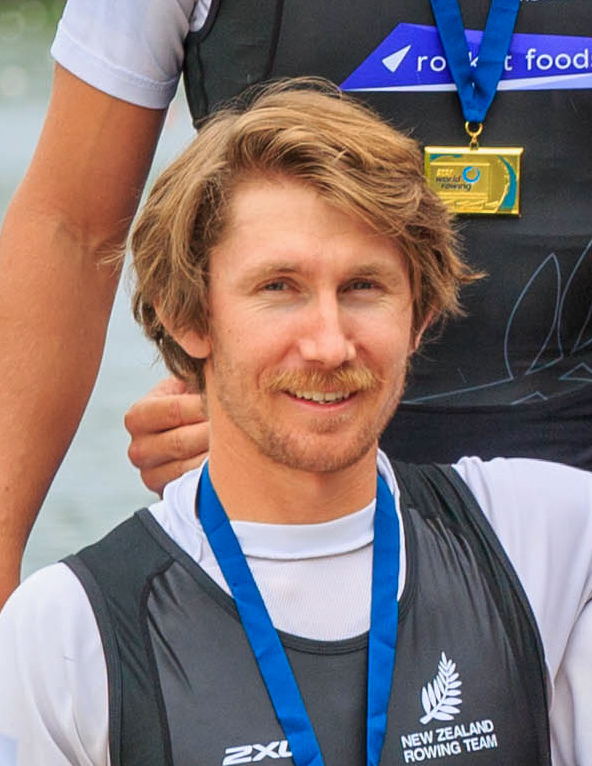
- Murray in 2021

Personal information
- Born: 5 April 1994 (age 32) Blenheim, New Zealand
- Height: 1.89 m (6 ft 2 in)

Sport
- Country: New Zealand
- Sport: Rowing
- Events: Coxless pair Eight
Medal record
Men's rowing
Representing New Zealand
Olympic Games
Gold medal – first place	2020 Tokyo	Eight
Silver medal – second place	2024 Paris	Coxless four
World Championships
Silver medal – second place	2019 Ottensheim	Coxless pair
Bronze medal – third place	2017 Sarasota	Coxless pair
Bronze medal – third place	2023 Belgrade	Coxless four

Thomas James Murray (born 5 April 1994) is a New Zealand rower. Born and raised in Blenheim, he is a member of New Zealand's national rowing team and has competed in the eight and in the coxless pair. In the smaller boat, he has medalled in two World Rowing Championships; bronze in 2017 and silver in 2019. At the 2016 Rio Olympics, he competed with the eight and won gold in the same boat class at the 2020 Tokyo Olympics. Murray has won four consecutive premier national titles in the coxless pair. He has been world champion in age group rowing events three times.

== Early life ==
Murray was born in 1994 in Blenheim. He received his education at Marlborough Boys' College, where he took up rowing in 2010 to keep himself fit for rugby union. Outside of rowing, he has an interest in archery and is a fan of Star Wars.

== Career ==
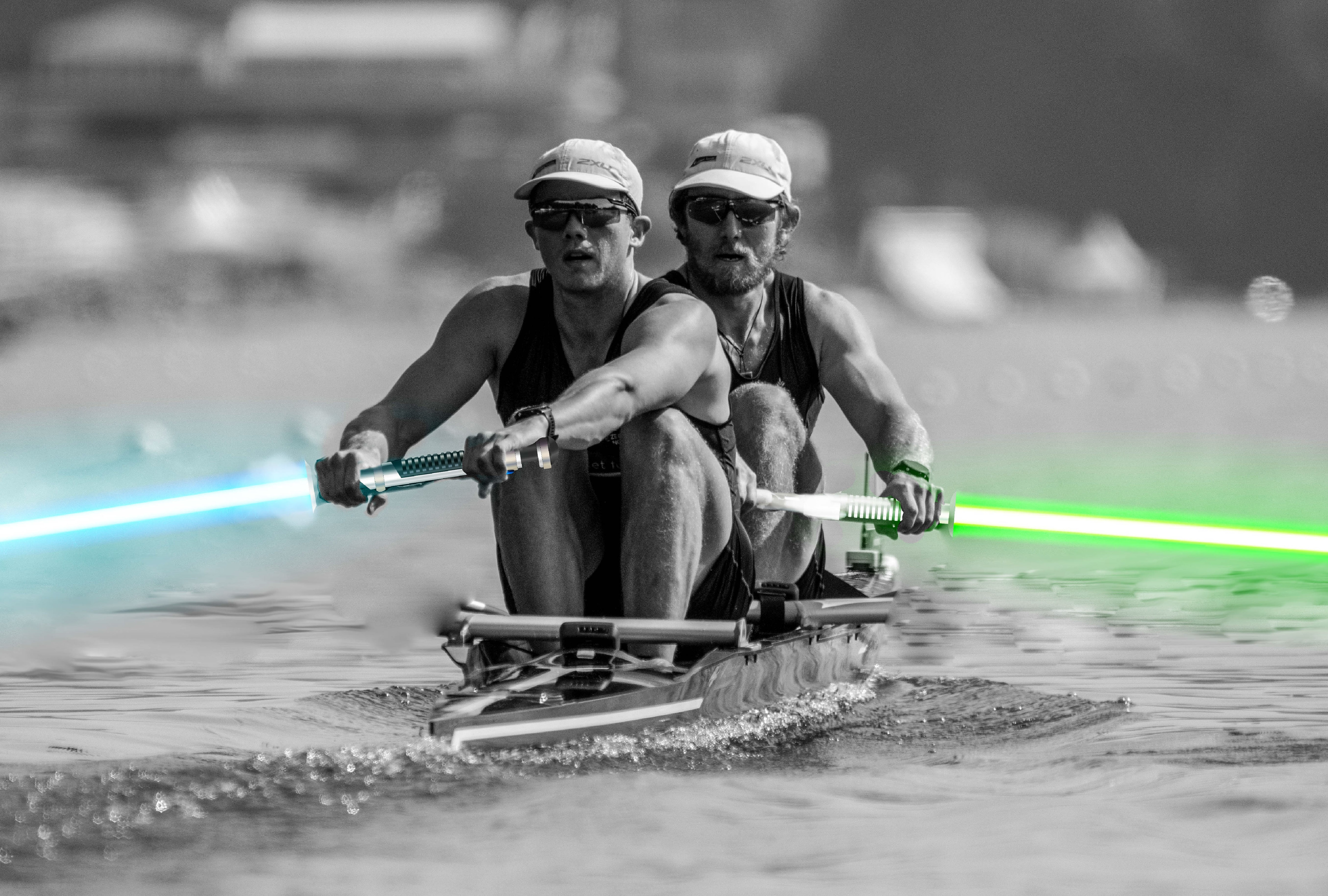
Artwork showing Murray (in the bow) with Michael Brake as Jedi rowers reflecting Murray's devotion to Star Wars

While Murray was at Marlborough Boys' College, he took up rowing for the school and joined the Blenheim Rowing Club. He first participated in the New Zealand Rowing Championships in February 2011 when they were held at Lake Ruataniwha. He competed in three boat classes and with the club coxed four and the U19 coxed four, he won gold.

At the February 2012 New Zealand rowing championships at Lake Karapiro, he competed in two club and two senior men's boat classes. In the club coxed four, he defended his title win. In the club eight, he came fifth. The same eight competed in the senior men's category where they again came fifth. The coxed four team also competed in the senior men's category, where they came third – his first medal in a senior men's boat class. Murray was selected for the New Zealand junior rowing team based on those results and he first rowed internationally at the 2012 World Rowing Junior Championships, which were held in Plovdiv, Bulgaria, in conjunction with the 2012 World Rowing Championships. The coxed four, which included Michael Brake and coxswain Sam Bosworth won gold at that regatta. In the 128-year history of the Blenheim Rowing Club, this was the first time that one of their members won a world championship title and Murray arrived home in Blenheim to a rousing reception.

At the February 2013 New Zealand rowing championships, Murray competed in four boat classes, including his first appearance in the premier class. (Note: Premier is the highest ability class and rowers can compete in this class once they have been accepted by one of the Regional Performance Centres (RPCs).) He placed fourth with the premier eight. With the U22 eight, he won bronze. With U20 teams, he won gold with a coxless pair and a coxless four. With the March 2013 World Rowing Cup I being held in Sydney, he was invited to join the senior men's eight; they came fourth, narrowly beaten by Australia I for bronze. He then went to the July 2013 World Rowing U23 Championships in Linz-Ottensheim, Austria, where the U23 eight team won gold. He was one of the finalists for the Emerging Talent category of the 2014 Halberg Awards, which covered the 2013 calendar year.

At the February 2014 New Zealand rowing championships, which started five days after the Halberg Awards, he competed in four boat classes. In the U22, he won bronze with the eight and came fourth in the coxless pair. In the premier class, he won bronze with the coxless four and silver with the eight. The March 2014 World Rowing Cup I was again held in Sydney, and Murray won two medals: silver in the coxless pair alongside Alex Kennedy, and bronze with the eight. He then went to the July 2014 World Rowing Cup III that was contested on the Rotsee in Austria where the NZ eight came fifth. Later that month, he competed at the 2014 World Rowing U23 Championships in Varese, Italy, where he won gold with the U23 eight.

At the February 2015 New Zealand rowing championships, Murray competed with two premier crews. He won silver in both the coxless pair (alongside James Hunter) and the eight. He was called into the elite team for the year and went to the 2015 World Rowing Cups II and III with the eight, in Varese (Italy) and at the Swiss Rotsee, respectively. They came fourth in Italy and won bronze in Switzerland. At the 2015 World Rowing Championships, the men's eight was beaten for a bronze medal by the Netherlands by 0.13 seconds. This result qualified this boat class for the 2016 Rio Olympics.

At the February 2016 New Zealand rowing championships, Murray won his first national title in the premier class. Competing in three boat classes, he won gold in the coxless pair with Hunter. In the coxless four, he came fifth, and in the eight, he won bronze. Internationally, he remained a member of the New Zealand eight. In preparation for the Olympics, they travelled to the 2016 World Rowing Cup II on the Swiss Rotsee, they came fifth. At the World Rowing Cup III in Poznań, Poland, they won bronze. The team came sixth at the Olympic competition in Rio de Janeiro. The last time a New Zealand eight had even qualified for the Olympics had been at the 1984 Los Angeles Olympics, 32 years prior.

At the 2017 New Zealand rowing nationals at Lake Ruataniwha, he partnered with Hunter in the premier men's pair and they became national champions for the second year in a row. Murray also competed at the nationals in the eight and won silver. His international competitions were with Hunt in the coxless pair, having taken over this boat class after the double-Olympic gold medallist pair of Hamish Bond and Eric Murray had retired after the 2016 Olympics. At the 2017 World Rowing Cup III at the Swiss Rotsee, ahead of the Croatian Sinković brothers Martin and Valent. At the 2017 World Rowing Championships in Sarasota, Florida, they won a bronze medal behind an Italian pair and the Sinković brothers.

At the 2018 New Zealand rowing nationals, he partnered with Phillip Wilson in the premier men's pair to retain his national championship title. With the premier eight, he won silver. Hunter retired after the 2018 nationals and Murray teamed up with Michael Brake for coxless pair instead. Both suffered broken bones in unrelated incidents within five days of one another (Murray broke a toe and Brake fell and broke a wrist) and whilst they travelled to 2018 World Rowing Cup II in Linz-Ottensheim, Austria, they did not compete. At the 2018 World Rowing Cup III at the Rotsee, they won gold. At the 2018 World Rowing Championships in Plovdiv, Bulgaria, they came fifth.

At the 2019 New Zealand rowing nationals, he competed in three premier boat classes. Partnered with Wilson, he retained his national title in the coxless pair. With the eight, he won bronze, and with the coxless four, he came fifth. Continuing to row internationally with Brake, they won silver at World Rowing Cup II in Poznań and bronze at World Rowing Cup III in Rotterdam, Netherlands. At the 2019 World Rowing Championships in Linz-Ottensheim, Austria, they won silver, beaten by the Sinković brothers for gold. This result qualified this boat class for the 2020 Tokyo Olympics.

At the 2020 New Zealand rowing nationals, he competed in the coxless pair only and his winning streak came to an end. The title went instead to Hamish Bond, who had come out of retirement, who teamed up with James Lassche; Murray and Wilson won silver. Due to the COVID-19 pandemic, there was no international rowing during 2020.

At the 2021 New Zealand rowing nationals, Murray competed in single scull (5th place) and in coxless pair with Wilson (4th place). In March 2021, Rowing New Zealand announced the elite team for the Olympic year and Murray was placed in the eight that had yet to qualify for the Games. At the Final Olympic Qualification Regatta at the Rotsee in May 2021, the top two teams gained qualification (four teams competed) and the New Zealand eight won both the preliminary race and the final. When New Zealand's Olympic team was announced in June 2021, Murray was confirmed to start with the eight. At the Tokyo Olympics, the men's eight was beaten in their heat by the Netherlands and had to thus go to the repechage, which they won. In the final, they sprinted past Germany and Great Britain to win the gold medal.

=== National titles ===
National titles for senior rowers are known as Red Coats in New Zealand. As of 2021, Murray has won four Red Coats.

Red Coats – New Zealand premier national titles
Coxless pair	2016, 2017, 2018, 2019
