= Nick Hudson (disambiguation) =

Nick Hudson (born 1983) is an Australian rower.

Nick Hudson may also refer to:

- One of the Green Party of Canada candidates, 2004 Canadian federal election
- Nic Hudson, guitarist of the American band Cartel (band)

== See also ==
- Nicholas Hudson (disambiguation)
