= Daniel Noonan =

Australian rower (born 1979)

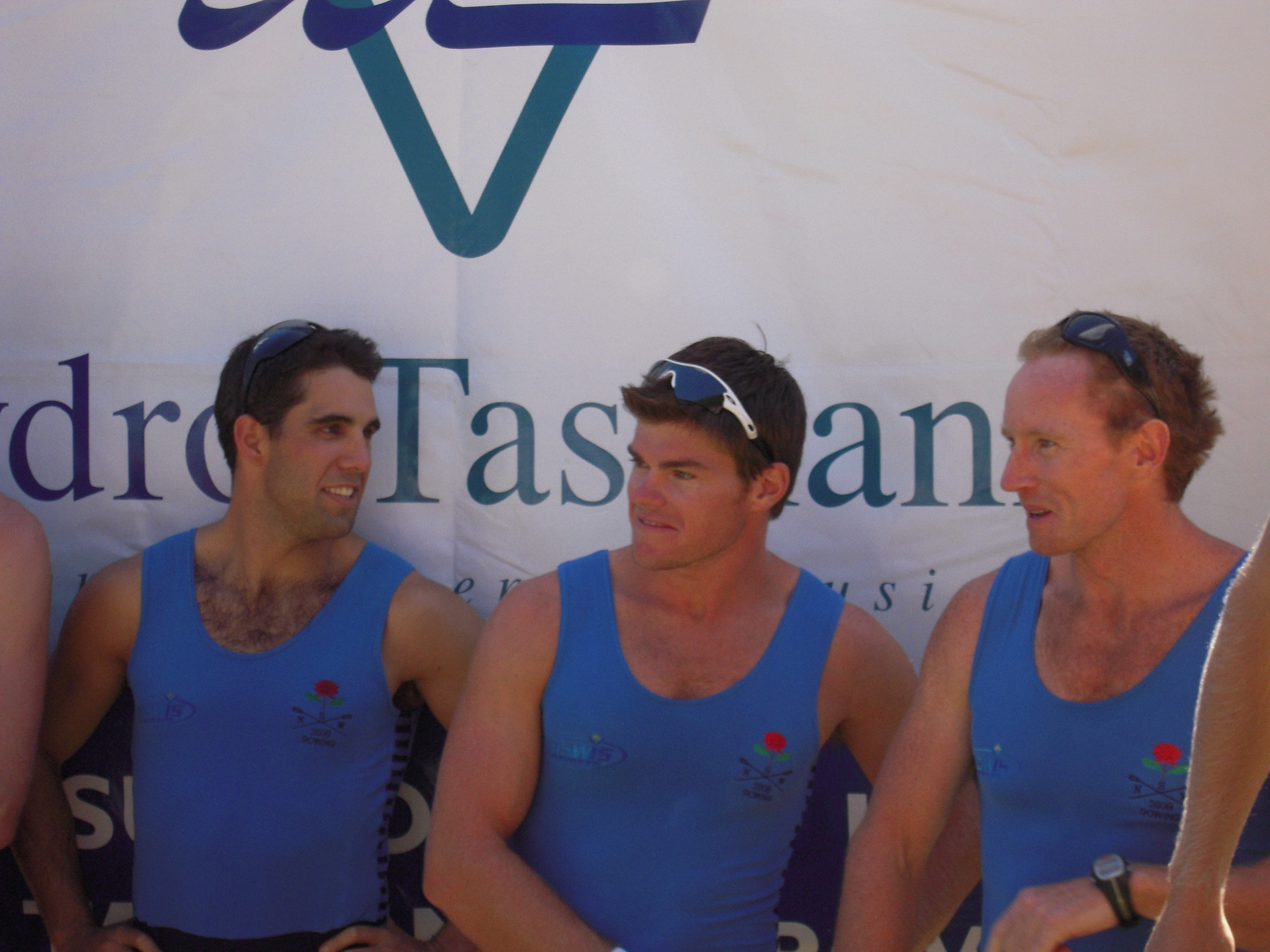
- Nick Hudson, Sam Loch and Noonan (right) after the New South Wales King's Cup victory of 2009.

Personal information
- Born: 28 October 1979 (age 47) Warren, New South Wales
- Years active: 1994–2013

Sport
- Country: Australia
- Sport: Rowing
- Club: Mosman Rowing Club

Achievements and titles
- Olympic finals: Beijing London M4X
- National finals: King's Cup 2009-13
Medal record
Men's rowing
Representing Australia
Olympic Games
Bronze medal – third place	2012 London	Quad scull
World Rowing Championships
Gold medal – first place	2011 Bled	M4x
Silver medal – second place	2009 Poznań	M4x
Bronze medal – third place	2010 Karapiro	M4x

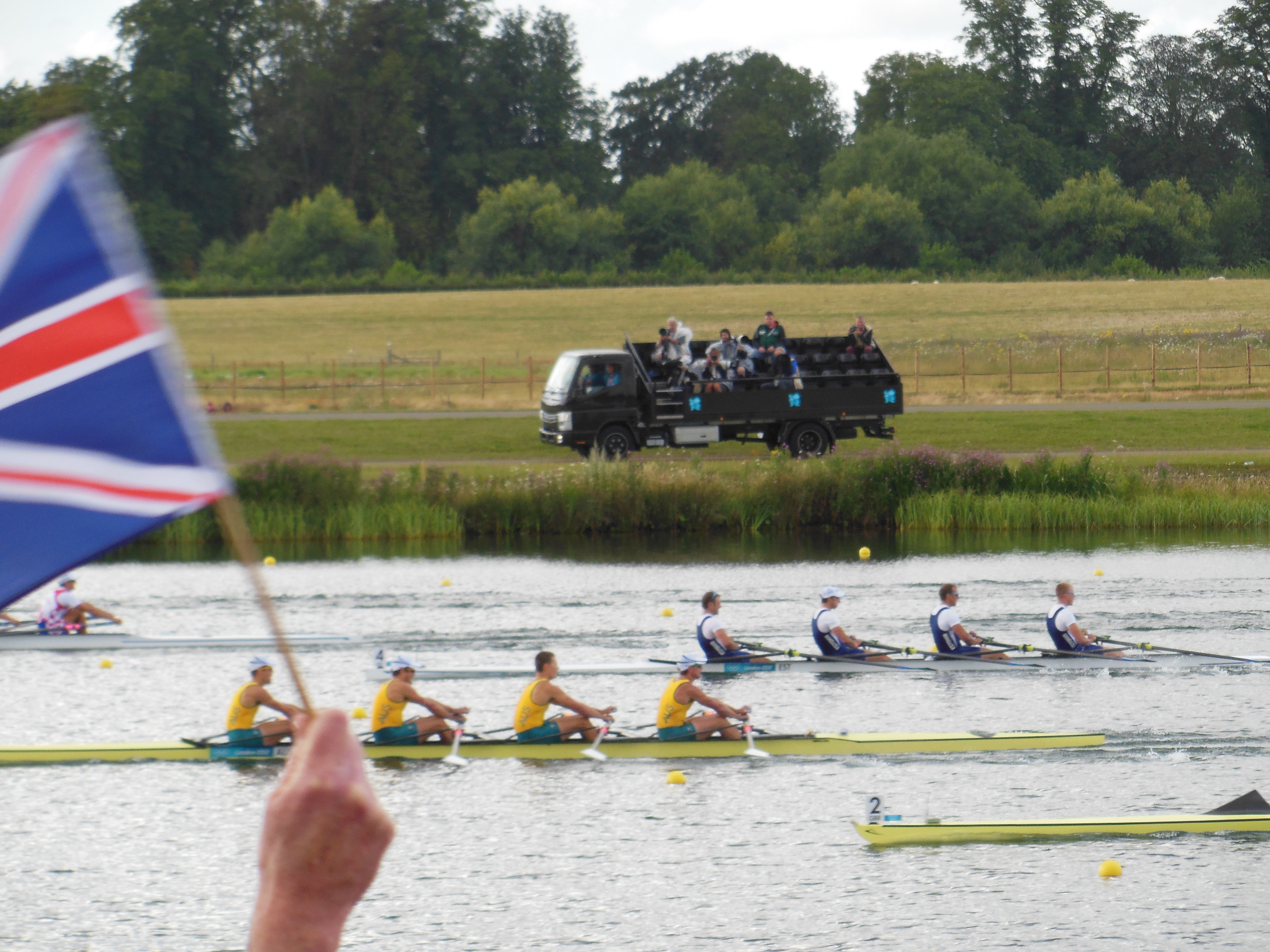
Rowing the final (left boat) of the quadruple sculls at the 2012 Summer Olympics.

Daniel Noonan (born 28 October 1979) is an Australian former representative rower. He was a national champion, a world champion, a dual Olympian and an Olympic medal winner.

== Club and state rowing ==
Noonan was educated at St Ignatius College, Riverview where he took up rowing. At Riverview in 1997 he stroked the school's 1st VIII to victory in the Riverview Gold Cup regatta – one of the premier events in the Sydney club calendar. It was the first time the Riverview schoolboy eight had won the senior open event at the Riverview Gold Cup in its 112-year history. His senior club rowing was from the Sydney University Boat Club and later the Mosman Rowing Club in Sydney.

Noonan first made state representation for New South Wales in the 1999 youth eight contesting the Noel F Wilkinson Trophy at the Interstate Regatta within the Australian Rowing Championships. Ten years later in 2009 he was picked in the New South Wales senior eight competing for the King's Cup at the Interstate Regatta. He then raced in five New South Wales eights from 2009 to 2013 for five consecutive King's Cup victories. He stroked those crews of 2010, 2011, 2012 and 2013.

At the 2006 Australian Rowing Championships in Sydney University Boat Club colours he contested all three sculling championship titles – single scull, double scull and the quad scull. At the 2011 Australian Championships, by now in Mosman colours, he again competed in all three men's sculling boat classes and claimed the national title in the 4X.

== International representative rowing ==
Notwithstanding his King's Cup success for New South Wales in the sweep-oared men's eight, Noonan's Australian representation was, aside from his junior debut, always in sculling boats. His World Championship medal success – gold in 2011, bronze in 2010 and silver in 2009 – came as stroke of the Australian men's quad scull. Both his Olympic appearances were in the stroke seat of the quad – fourth place in the Olympic final at Beijing 2008 and a bronze medal in London 2012.

Noonan first represented Australia at the 1997 Junior World Rowing Championships in Hazewinkel, Belgium where he stroked a junior coxed four to a fifth placing. His next national appearance was in 2000 in an U23 quad scull racing at the World Rowing Cup III in Lucerne before contesting the 2000 World Rowing U23 Championships in Copenhagen where they took a silver medal.

It was 2006 before Noonan secured a place in the Australian senior squad. He stroked the men's quad at two World Rowing Cups in Europe before contesting the 2006 World Rowing Championships at Eton Dorney where they finished in overall ninth place. In 2007 he competed in a single scull at World Rowing Cups in Linz and in Amsterdam. In 2008 he was back in the men's quad with James McRae and Brendan Long as they prepared their Olympic campaign. They contested two World Rowing Cups with Peter Hardcastle in the other seat, then at Beijing 2008 Hardcastle was changed out for Chris Morgan in the bow. In their first race at Beijing, they broke the world record to win their heat. That time of 5:36.20 stood as the Olympic best time until the 2020 Tokyo Olympics. Noonan stroked that crew to a fourth placing in the Olympic final – 1/3 of a second behind the French bronze medallists.

With unfinished business from Beijing, Noonan held the stoke seat in the Australian men's quad for the entire next Olympiad and led those crews to considerable success. With Crawshay and newcomers Jared Bidwell and Nick Hudson they rowed an incredible campaign at the 2009 World Rowing Championships in Poznan. After placing fourth in their heat, they fought through a repechage and semi-final to make the final in which they pulled off a stunning second place and a silver medal. In 2010 McRae and Morgan were again in crew contention along with Karsten Forsterling. A combination raced at two World Rowing Cups in Europe that year and then in Lake Karapiro at the 2010 World Rowing Championships Noonan, Crawshay, McRae and Fosterling rowed to a bronze medal. In 2011 Crawshay was changed-out for Chris Morgan and this combination commenced their Olympic campaign. At Bled 2011 in an upset, the Australian quad defeated the fancied German crew to win world championship gold. Following a costly mistake in the German boat the Australian crew took the lead in the last few metres of the race and won by 0.25secs.

The world champion Australian quad remained together with seats unchanged into the 2012 London Olympics. At Eton Dorney they placed third in their heat but qualified through to the semi-final where they finished second behind Croatia. In the 2012 Olympic final they were in fourth place at each mark before coming home to take the bronze medal behind the Croatian and German boats.

Noonan made no retirement announcement after London and continued to row at the highest national level into 2013, however ultimately the 2012 Olympics proved to be his last Australian representative appearance.

== Coaching ==
In 2012 Noonan was appointed as the Head of Rowing at his former school St Ignatius College. In 2022 he coached the New South Wales men's senior eight to a King's Cup victory at the Interstate Regatta.
