= 2019 World Rowing Championships – Men's coxless pair =

Rowing event

Men's coxless pair at the 2019 World Rowing Championships
- Venue: Linz-Ottensheim
- Location: Ottensheim, Austria
- Dates: 25–31 August
- Competitors: 57 from 28 nations
- Winning time: 6:42.28

Medalists
gold medal	Martin Sinković; Valent Sinković	Croatia
silver medal	Tom Murray; Michael Brake	New Zealand
bronze medal	Sam Hardy; Joshua Hicks	Australia

The men's coxless pair competition at the 2019 World Rowing Championships took place at the Linz-Ottensheim regatta venue. A top-eleven finish ensured qualification for the Tokyo Olympics.

== Schedule ==
The schedule was as follows:

Date	Time	Round
Sunday 25 August 2019	10:31	Heats
Monday 26 August 2019	12:07	Repechages
Wednesday 28 August 2019	11:13	Quarterfinals
Thursday 29 August 2019	17:35	Final E
Friday 30 August 2019	09:25	Semifinals C/D
Friday 30 August 2019	11:20	Semifinals A/B
Saturday 31 August 2019	09:38	Final D
Saturday 31 August 2019	09:58	Final C
Saturday 31 August 2019	11:12	Final B
Saturday 31 August 2019	13:37	Final A

All times are Central European Summer Time (UTC+2)

== Results ==
=== Heats ===
The four fastest boats in each heat advanced directly to the quarterfinals. The remaining boats were sent to the repechages.

==== Heat 1 ====
Rank	Rowers	Country	Time	Notes
1	Martin Sinković; Valent Sinković	Croatia	6:26.71	Q
2	Sam Hardy; Joshua Hicks	Australia	6:29.13	Q
3	Joachim Sutton; Bastian Secher	Denmark	6:33.15	Q
4	Ezra Carlson; Anders Weiss	United States	6:34.15	Q
5	Xavier Vela; Pau Vela	Brazil	6:34.93	R
6	Mark O'Donovan; Shane O'Driscoll	Ireland	6:50.51	R

==== Heat 2 ====
Rank	Rowers	Country	Time	Notes
1	Selahattin Gürsoy; Besim Şahinoğlu	Turkey	6:37.40	Q
2	Morgan Bolding; Tom Jeffery	Great Britain	6:37.97	Q
3	Lukáš Helešic; Jakub Podrazil	Czech Republic	6:39.07	Q
4	Bartosz Modrzyński; Łukasz Posyłajka	Poland	6:39.42	Q
5	Ignacio Abraham; Cristopher Kalleg	Chile	6:42.50	R
6	Adrián Juhász; Béla Simon	Hungary	6:45.69	R

==== Heat 3 ====
Rank	Rowers	Country	Time	Notes
1	Matteo Lodo; Giuseppe Vicino	Italy	6:33.15	Q
2	Tom Murray; Michael Brake	New Zealand	6:35.50	Q
3	Valentin Onfroy; Théophile Onfroy	France	6:36.35	Q
4	Wolf-Niclas Schröder; Paul Gebauer	Germany	6:36.74	Q
5	Freek Robbers; Michiel Mantel	Netherlands	6:52.96	R
6	Povilas Stankunas; Mantas Juskevicius	Lithuania	7:03.73	R

==== Heat 4 ====
Rank	Rowers	Country	Time	Notes
1	Jaime Canalejo; Javier Garcia	Spain	6:31.26	Q
2	Kai Langerfeld; Conlin McCabe	Canada	6:31.75	Q
3	Dzimitry Furman; Siarhei Valadzko	Belarus	6:39.36	Q
4	Cheng Xunman; Cai Pengpeng	China	6:40.48	Q
5	Ioannis Kalandaridis; Athanasios Palaiopanos	Greece	6:43.88	R

==== Heat 5 ====
Rank	Rowers	Country	Time	Notes
1	John Smith; Lawrence Brittain	South Africa	6:36.03	Q
2	Martin Mačković; Miloš Vasić	Serbia	6:39.08	Q
3	Marius Cozmiuc; Ciprian Tudosă	Romania	6:41.96	Q
4	Agustín Díaz; Axek Haack	Argentina	6:49.25	Q
5	Carlos Ajete; Jesús Rodríguez	Cuba	6:59.43	R

=== Repechages ===
The two fastest boats in each repechage advanced to the quarterfinals. The remaining boats were sent to the E final.

==== Repechage 1 ====
Rank	Rowers	Country	Time	Notes
1	Xavier Vela; Pau Vela	Brazil	6:43.63	Q
2	Freek Robbers; Michiel Mantel	Netherlands	6:45.76	Q
3	Carlos Ajete; Jesús Rodríguez	Cuba	6:49.25	FE
4	Adrián Juhász; Béla Simon	Hungary	6:49.33	FE

==== Repechage 2 ====
Rank	Rowers	Country	Time	Notes
1	Ignacio Abraham; Cristopher Kalleg	Chile	6:43.70	Q
2	Ioannis Kalandaridis; Athanasios Palaiopanos	Greece	6:43.71	Q
3	Mark O'Donovan; Shane O'Driscoll	Ireland	6:44.35	FE
4	Povilas Stankunas; Mantas Juskevicius	Lithuania	6:58.42	FE

=== Quarterfinals ===
The three fastest boats in each quarter advanced to the A/B semifinals. The remaining boats were sent to the C/D semifinals.

==== Quarterfinal 1 ====
Rank	Rowers	Country	Time	Notes
1	Martin Sinković; Valent Sinković	Croatia	6:30.27	SA/B
2	Valentin Onfroy; Théophile Onfroy	France	6:32.61	SA/B
3	Dzimitry Furman; Siarhei Valadzko	Belarus	6:35.91	SA/B
4	Selahattin Gürsoy; Besim Şahinoğlu	Turkey	6:36.23	SC/D
5	Agustín Díaz; Axek Haack	Argentina	6:41.05	SC/D
6	Ioannis Kalandaridis; Athanasios Palaiopanos	Greece	6:45.44	SC/D

==== Quarterfinal 2 ====
Rank	Rowers	Country	Time	Notes
1	Matteo Lodo; Giuseppe Vicino	Italy	6:37.92	SA/B
2	Marius Cozmiuc; Ciprian Tudosă	Romania	6:38.25	SA/B
3	Kai Langerfeld; Conlin McCabe	Canada	6:42.49	SA/B
4	Bartosz Modrzyński; Łukasz Posyłajka	Poland	6:47.82	SC/D
5	Joachim Sutton; Bastian Secher	Denmark	6:48.16	SC/D
6	Ignacio Abraham; Cristopher Kalleg	Chile	7:22.71	SC/D

==== Quarterfinal 3 ====
Rank	Rowers	Country	Time	Notes
1	Sam Hardy; Joshua Hicks	Australia	6:31.51	SA/B
2	Martin Mačković; Miloš Vasić	Serbia	6:31.72	SA/B
3	Jaime Canalejo; Javier Garcia	Spain	6:33.01	SA/B
4	Lukáš Helešic; Jakub Podrazil	Czech Republic	6:35.04	SC/D
5	Freek Robbers; Michiel Mantel	Netherlands	6:37.61	SC/D
6	Wolf-Niclas Schröder; Paul Gebauer	Germany	6:46.61	SC/D

==== Quarterfinal 4 ====
Rank	Rowers	Country	Time	Notes
1	Tom Murray; Michael Brake	New Zealand	6:29.70	SA/B
2	John Smith; Lawrence Brittain	South Africa	6:30.73	SA/B
3	Morgan Bolding; Tom Jeffery	Great Britain	6:31.62	SA/B
4	Ezra Carlson; Anders Weiss	United States	6:32.04	SC/D
5	Xavier Vela; Pau Vela	Brazil	6:37.31	SC/D
6	Cheng Xunman; Cai Pengpeng	China	6:40.17	SC/D

=== Semifinals C/D ===
The three fastest boats in each semi were sent to the C final. The remaining boats were sent to the D final.

==== Semifinal 1 ====
Rank	Rowers	Country	Time	Notes
1	Wolf-Niclas Schröder; Paul Gebauer	Germany	6:36.68	FC
2	Freek Robbers; Michiel Mantel	Netherlands	6:37.00	FC
3	Bartosz Modrzyński; Łukasz Posyłajka	Poland	6:37.14	FC
4	Xavier Vela; Pau Vela	Brazil	6:37.21	FD
5	Selahattin Gürsoy; Besim Şahinoğlu	Turkey	6:42.69	FD
6	Ioannis Kalandaridis; Athanasios Palaiopanos	Greece	6:45.82	FD

==== Semifinal 2 ====
Rank	Rowers	Country	Time	Notes
1	Ezra Carlson; Anders Weiss	United States	6:38.47	FC
2	Joachim Sutton; Bastian Secher	Denmark	6:39.95	FC
3	Agustín Díaz; Axek Haack	Argentina	6:41.55	FC
4	Lukáš Helešic; Jakub Podrazil	Czech Republic	6:43.37	FD
5	Cheng Xunman; Cai Pengpeng	China	6:44.76	FD
6	Ignacio Abraham; Cristopher Kalleg	Chile	6:46.74	FD

=== Semifinals A/B ===
The three fastest boats in each semi advanced to the A final. The remaining boats were sent to the B final.

==== Semifinal 1 ====
Rank	Rowers	Country	Time	Notes
1	Martin Sinković; Valent Sinković	Croatia	6:50.91	FA
2	Matteo Lodo; Giuseppe Vicino	Italy	6:52.37	FA
3	Jaime Canalejo; Javier Garcia	Spain	6:54.01	FA
4	John Smith; Lawrence Brittain	South Africa	6:55.69	FB
5	Martin Mačković; Miloš Vasić	Serbia	6:57.07	FB
6	Dzimitry Furman; Siarhei Valadzko	Belarus	6:57.97	FB

==== Semifinal 2 ====
Rank	Rowers	Country	Time	Notes
1	Tom Murray; Michael Brake	New Zealand	6:48.49	FA
2	Sam Hardy; Joshua Hicks	Australia	6:51.31	FA
3	Valentin Onfroy; Théophile Onfroy	France	6:52.17	FA
4	Marius Cozmiuc; Ciprian Tudosă	Romania	6:53.60	FB
5	Kai Langerfeld; Conlin McCabe	Canada	6:56.24	FB
6	Morgan Bolding; Tom Jeffery	Great Britain	6:59.92	FB

=== Finals ===
The A final determined the rankings for places 1 to 6. Additional rankings were determined in the other finals.

==== Final E ====
Rank	Rowers	Country	Time
1	Mark O'Donovan; Shane O'Driscoll	Ireland	6:36.30
2	Povilas Stankunas; Martynas Džiaugys	Lithuania	6:41.53
3	Carlos Ajete; Jesús Rodríguez	Cuba	6:52.49
4	Adrián Juhász; Béla Simon	Hungary	DNS

==== Final D ====
Rank	Rowers	Country	Time
1	Cheng Xunman; Cai Pengpeng	China	6:35.16
2	Xavier Vela; Pau Vela	Brazil	6:37.66
3	Lukáš Helešic; Jakub Podrazil	Czech Republic	6:39.41
4	Ioannis Kalandaridis; Athanasios Palaiopanos	Greece	6:42.72
5	Selahattin Gürsoy; Besim Şahinoğlu	Turkey	6:46.03
6	Ignacio Abraham; Cristopher Kalleg	Chile	DNS

==== Final C ====
Rank	Rowers	Country	Time
1	Ezra Carlson; Anders Weiss	United States	6:29.94
2	Bartosz Modrzyński; Łukasz Posyłajka	Poland	6:31.36
3	Joachim Sutton; Bastian Secher	Denmark	6:31.60
4	Agustín Díaz; Axek Haack	Argentina	6:34.03
5	Wolf-Niclas Schröder; Paul Gebauer	Germany	6:35.37
6	Freek Robbers; Michiel Mantel	Netherlands	6:40.35

==== Final B ====
Rank	Rowers	Country	Time
1	Martin Mačković; Miloš Vasić	Serbia	6:33.91
2	Kai Langerfeld; Conlin McCabe	Canada	6:34.28
3	John Smith; Lawrence Brittain	South Africa	6:35.04
4	Marius Cozmiuc; Ciprian Tudosă	Romania	6:35.53
5	Dzimitry Furman; Siarhei Valadzko	Belarus	6:38.13
6	Morgan Bolding; Tom Jeffery	Great Britain	6:40.65

==== Final A ====
Rank	Rowers	Country	Time
1st place, gold medalist(s)	Martin Sinković; Valent Sinković	Croatia	6:42.28
2nd place, silver medalist(s)	Tom Murray; Michael Brake	New Zealand	6:45.47
3rd place, bronze medalist(s)	Sam Hardy; Joshua Hicks	Australia	6:51.81
4	Matteo Lodo; Giuseppe Vicino	Italy	6:55.34
5	Jaime Canalejo; Javier Garcia	Spain	6:57.40
6	Valentin Onfroy; Théophile Onfroy	France	7:02.05
