= Rowing at the 2013 Summer Universiade – Men's double sculls =

The men's double sculls competition at the 2013 Summer Universiade in Kazan took place the Kazan Rowing Centre.

== Results ==
=== Heats ===
==== Heat 1 ====
| Rank | Rower | Country | Time | Notes |
|---|---|---|---|---|
| 1 | Rolandas Maščinskas; Saulius Ritter | Lithuania | 6:34.57 | Q |
| 2 | Dmitriy Khmylnin; Denis Pribyl | Russia | 6:40.56 | Q |
| 3 | Jüri-Mikk Udam; Geir Suursild | Estonia | 6:41.70 | Q |
| 4 | Mathias Raymond; Quentin Antognelli | Monaco | 6:53.33 | R |
| 5 | Jan Erik Freund; Freek Robbers | Netherlands | 7:46.67 | R |

==== Heat 2 ====
| Rank | Rower | Country | Time | Notes |
|---|---|---|---|---|
| 1 | Ivan Dovhodko; Oleksandr Nadtoka | Ukraine | 6:41.73 | Q |
| 2 | Bendeguz Pal Petervari-Molnar; Gergely Marton Papp | Hungary | 6:43.22 | Q |
| 3 | Kim Dong-yong; Choi Do-sub | South Korea | 6:50.28 | Q |
| 4 | Maksim Radzko; Maksim Shauchenka | Belarus | 6:54.63 | R |

==== Heat 3 ====
| Rank | Rower | Country | Time | Notes |
|---|---|---|---|---|
| 1 | Jakub Houska; Petr Buzrla | Czech Republic | 6:49.39 | Q |
| 2 | Davide Babboni; Bernardo Miccoli | Italy | 6:54.21 | Q |
| 3 | Hagen Rothe; Heiner Schwartz | Germany | 6:58.64 | Q |
| 4 | Bartlomiej Lesniak; Antoni Kozaka | Poland | 7:04.51 | R |

=== Repechage ===
| Rank | Rower | Country | Time | Notes |
|---|---|---|---|---|
| 1 | Jan Erik Freund; Freek Robbers | Netherlands | 7:11.66 | Q |
| 2 | Mathias Raymond; Quentin Antognelli | Monaco | 7:11.90 | Q |
| 3 | Maksim Radzko; Maksim Shauchenka | Belarus | 7:12.57 | Q |
| 4 | Bartlomiej Lesniak; Antoni Kozaka | Poland | 7:14.27 | |

=== Semifinals ===
==== Semifinal 1 ====
| Rank | Rower | Country | Time | Notes |
|---|---|---|---|---|
| | Hagen Rothe; Heiner Schwartz | Germany | | |
| | Bendeguz Pal Petervari-Molnar; Gergely Marton Papp | Hungary | | |
| | Rolandas Maščinskas; Saulius Ritter | Lithuania | | |
| | Jakub Houska; Petr Buzrla | Czech Republic | | |
| | Juri-Mikk Udam; Geir Suursild | Estonia | | |
| | Mathias Raymond; Quentin Antognelli | Monaco | | |

==== Semifinal 2 ====
| Rank | Rower | Country | Time | Notes |
|---|---|---|---|---|
| | Maksim Radzko; Maksim Shauchenka | Belarus | | |
| | Kim Dong-yong; Choi Do-sub | South Korea | | |
| | Dmitriy Khmylnin; Denis Pribyl | Russia | | |
| | Ivan Dovhodko; Oleksandr Nadtoka | Ukraine | | |
| | Davide Babboni; Bernardo Miccoli | Italy | | |
| | Jan Erik Freund; Freek Robbers | Netherlands | | |
