= James McRae =

Australian rower

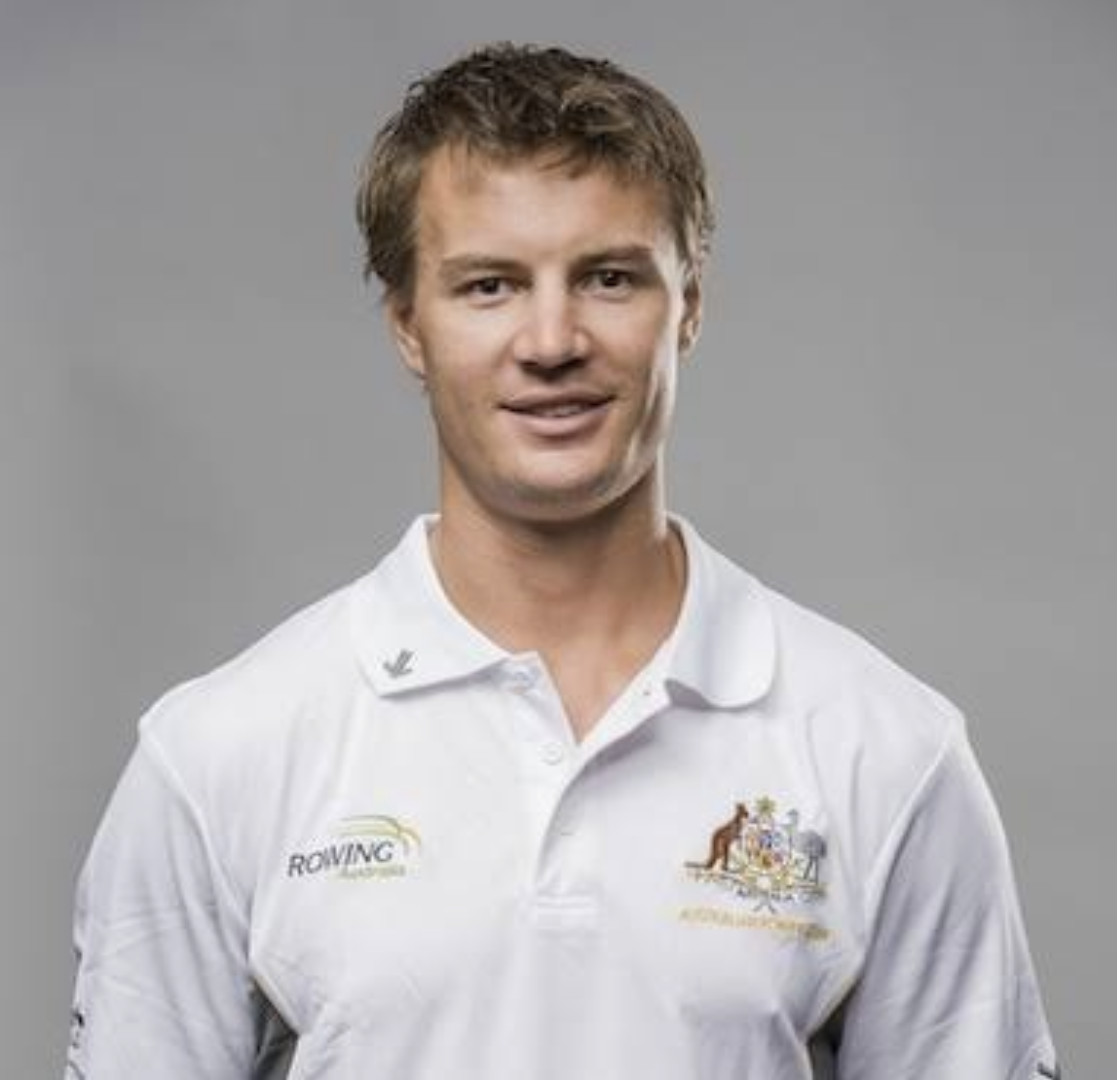

Personal information
- Born: 27 June 1987 (age 39) Monteith, South Australia
- Education: Unity College
- Height: 194 cm (6 ft 4 in)
- Weight: 116 kg (256 lb)

Sport
- Country: Australia
- Sport: Rowing
- Club: Murray Bridge
- Coached by: John Driessen
Medal record
Men's rowing
Representing Australia
Olympic Games
Silver medal – second place	2016 Rio	Quad scull
Bronze medal – third place	2012 London	Quad scull
World Championships
Gold medal – first place	2011 Bled	Quad scull
Bronze medal – third place	2010 Karapiro	Quad scull
Bronze medal – third place	2014 Amsterdam	M2x
- Updated on 4 August 2016

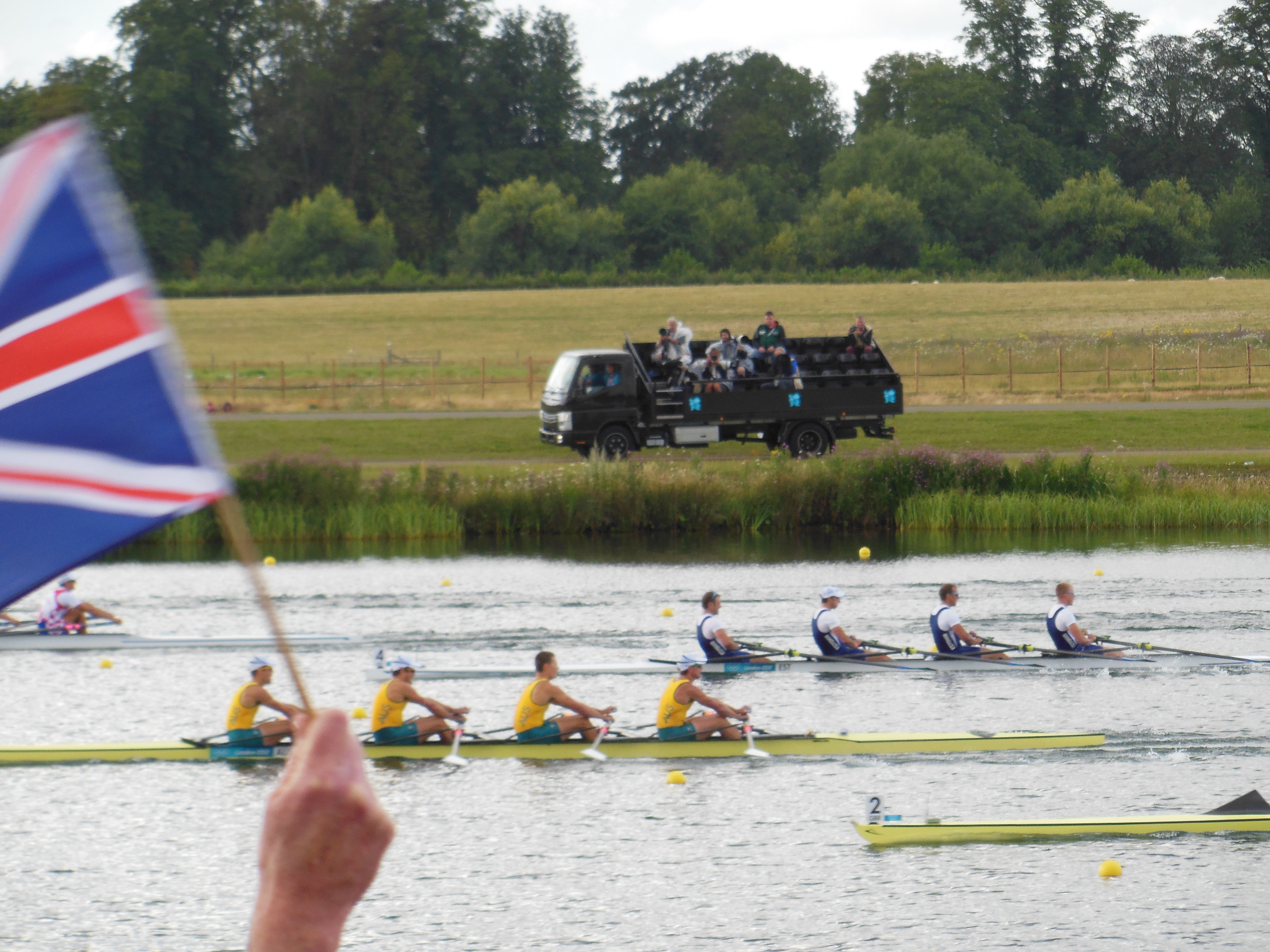
Rowing the final (left boat) of the quadruple sculls at the 2012 Summer Olympics.

James McRae (born 27 June 1987) is an Australian former representative rower. He is a national champion, world champion, three time Olympian, Olympic medallist and record holder. In the Australian men's quad scull he won a silver medal at the 2016 Summer Olympics and a bronze medal at the 2012 Summer Olympics.

== Early life ==
McRae grew up in Murray Bridge South Australia and attended Murray Bridge Primary school and was dux of Unity College, Murray Bridge. He commenced a B. Mech Eng at the University of Adelaide in 2007.

McRae's siblings Jessica and Anna are Australian rowers who've held South Australian Sports Institute scholarships and won Australian titles. Anna McRae has also competed internationally for Australia.

== Club and state rowing ==
McRae rows from the Murray Bridge Rowing Club. He is a South Australian Sports Institute (SASI) Scholarship holder and was coached by Adrian David a Romanian former international oarsman.

For nine consecutive years from 2008 to 2016 McCrae was seated in the South Australian men's eights who contested the King's Cup at the Australian Rowing Championships. In 2007 and 2011 he was also South Australia's selectee to contest the interstate men's Single scull – the President's Cup. In 2011 he won that event and also rowed in the open men's Quad scull who won the national title.

In October 2009 McRae was awarded life membership of the Murray Bridge Rowing Club for being the club's most successful rower and the club's first Olympian since their entire VIII of 1924 " the Murray Cods" competed at Paris 1924. He undertook a number of public speaking and promotional events after the Beijing games. In April 2010 McRae took part in an 'Active April' event involving Australian Broadcasting Corporation radio personalities Tony McCarthy and John Kenneally.

== International rowing career ==
McRae began his international career competing with Matt Bolt in a Double scull at the 2005 World Rowing Junior Championships.

McRae competed at the 2008 Beijing Olympic Games in the men's Quad scull. In their first race at Beijing, the Australian crew of McRae, Daniel Noonan, Brendan Long and Chris Morgan broke the world record to win their heat. That time of 5:36.20 stood as the Olympic best time until the 2020 Tokyo Olympics. The quad finished second in their semi-final to secure a place in the Olympic final. In the final the Australian quad crew was unable to capitalise on their earlier world record form and finished fourth.

After Beijing, McRae continued rowing at the highest level, winning a bronze in the men's quad scull at the 2010 World Rowing Championships At the 2011 World Rowing Championships in an upset, the Australian heavyweight quad of McRae, Daniel Noonan, Karsten Forsterling and Chris Morgan defeated the German crew to win gold. Following a costly mistake in the German boat the Australian crew took the lead in the last few metres of the race and won by 0.25secs.

At the 2012 London Olympics, McRae won bronze in the men's quad in a time of 5:45.22.

At the 2014 World Rowing Championships in Amsterdam he won bronze in the men's pair racing with Alexander Belonogoff. In 2016 along with Karsten Forsterling, Cameron Girdlestone and Belonogoff, McRae won the silver medal in the Australian quad to at the Rio Olympics 2016.
