= Sam Hardy (rower) =

Australian rower (born 1995)

Personal information
- Nationality: Australian
- Born: 21 July 1995 (age 30) Camperdown, New South Wales
- Education: Newington College; Harvard University
- Years active: 2011–
- Height: 198 cm (6 ft 6 in)
- Weight: 92 kg (203 lb)

Sport
- Country: Australia
- Sport: Rowing
- Event: Coxless pair
- Club: Sydney Rowing Club
Medal record
Men's rowing
Representing Australia
World Championships
Bronze medal – third place	2019 Ottensheim	Coxless pair
Bronze medal – third place	2022 Račice	Eight

Sam Hardy (born 21 July 1995) is an Australian representative rower. He is a national champion, a national representative, an Olympian and won a bronze medals at the 2019 and 2022 World Rowing Championships.

== Club and state rowing ==
Hardy was educated at Newington College in Sydney where he took up rowing. He was seated at six in Newington's senior eight of 2013. His senior rowing in Australia has been from the Sydney Rowing Club.

Hardy made his first state representation appearance for NSW when selected in the 2014 NSW youth eight to contest the Nole Wolkinson Trophy at the Interstate Regatta within the Australian Rowing Championships. He then attended Harvard University where he rowed in the Harvard varsity eight.

In 2019 he contested the open men's coxless pair title at the Australian Rowing Championships with Josh Hicks and finished in third place. He also contested the open men's coxless four championship and finished second. He again contested the coxless pair with Hicks at the 2021 Australian Rowing Championships and that year won a national championship title in Sydney Rowing Club colours in the open men's coxed eight. His first senior state representative appearance came in 2021 when he raced the King's Cup in the bow seat of the New South Wales eight which finished second. In 2022 and 2023 he again rowed in victorious New South Wales King's Cup eights.

== International representative rowing ==
Hardy made his Australian representative debut at the 2015 World Rowing U23 Championships racing in Australia's coxed four to a fifth placing. The following year at the 2016 World Rowing U23 Championships in Rotterdam he was again in the Australian coxed four and they rowed to a bronze medal. In 2017 he had a third consecutive year in the three seat of the Australian coxed four at the U23 World Championships. They finished in fifth place.

In 2019 Hardy broke into the Australian senior sweep squad for the international representative season. At the World Rowing Cup III in Rotterdam Hardy rowed with Josh Hicks in the number two Australian pair finishing in 7th place whilst Alex Hill and Spencer Turrin took gold in the number one Australian men's coxless pair. Hicks and Hardy were then selected to race Australia's coxless pair at the 2019 World Rowing Championships in Linz, Austria. The pair were looking for a top eleven finish at the 2019 World Championships to qualify for the Tokyo Olympics. They were second in their heat, won their quarter-final and placed second in their semi-final, thereby qualifying the boat for Tokyo 2020. In the A-final they finished in third place behind the dominant Sinković brothers and took the bronze medal.

Hardy raced in the Australian men's coxless pair at Tokyo 2021. Hardy and Hicks dominated their heat powering though the Italians by the 1000m mark. Their fourth place in the semi-final caused them to miss the cut for the A final and in the B final the next day they again finished fourth to conclude their Olympic regatta performance in overall tenth place. Full details.

Hardy was selected into the Australian men's eight squad to prepare for the 2022 international season and the 2022 World Rowing Championships. At the World Rowing Cup II in Poznan and at the WRC III in Lucerne, Hardy rowed in the Australian men's eight to a silver medal on both occasions. At the 2022 World Rowing Championships at Racize, the eight won through their repechage to make the A final where they raced to a third place and a World Championship bronze medal.

In March 2023 Hardy was again selected in the Australian senior men's sweep-oar squad for the 2023 international season.
