= Liam Blyde =

New Zealand rugby player (born 1997)

- Full name: Liam G Blyde
- Born: 26 September 1997 (age 29) Taranaki, New Zealand
- Height: 181 cm (5 ft 11 in)
- Weight: 87 kg (13 st 10 lb; 192 lb)
- School: New Plymouth Boys' High School
- Notable relatives: Cherry Blyde (mother); Michaela Blyde (sister); Michael Brake (brother-in-law)
- Occupation: Teacher

Rugby union career
- Position: Halfback
- Current team: Taranaki
Senior career
Years	Team	Apps	(Points)
2018-	Taranaki	21	(25)

Liam Blyde (born 26 September 1997) is a New Zealand rugby union player who currently plays as a halfback for Taranaki in New Zealand's domestic Mitre 10 Cup.

== Early career ==
Blyde is originally from Lepperton and was schooled at New Plymouth Boys' High School where he played first XV and halfback. His identical twin brother, Cole, was a loose forward for the first XV. His mother is one-time Black Fern Cherry and he is the younger brother of New Zealand sevens player Michaela Blyde. His cousins Louise, Lucy and Tara all played for the Taranaki Whio in the Farah Palmer Cup.

== Senior career ==
Blyde plays for Clifton in the Taranaki domestic club rugby. Blyde made his debut for Taranaki in a Ranfurly Shield pre-season match against Poverty Bay at his home club in 2018. He went onto play 28 matches for Taranaki in the National Provincial Championship and scored five tries until 2023. He played for Cronulla in Sydney's Shute Shield during the 2024 season.
