= Karsten Forsterling =

Australian rower

Medal record

Men's rowing

Representing Australia

Olympic Games
Silver medal – second place	2016 Rio de Janeiro	Quad scull
Bronze medal – third place	2012 London	Quad scull

World Championships
Bronze medal – third place	2010 Karapiro	M4x
Gold medal – first place	2011 Bled	M4x
Silver medal – second place	2015 Aiguebelette	M4x

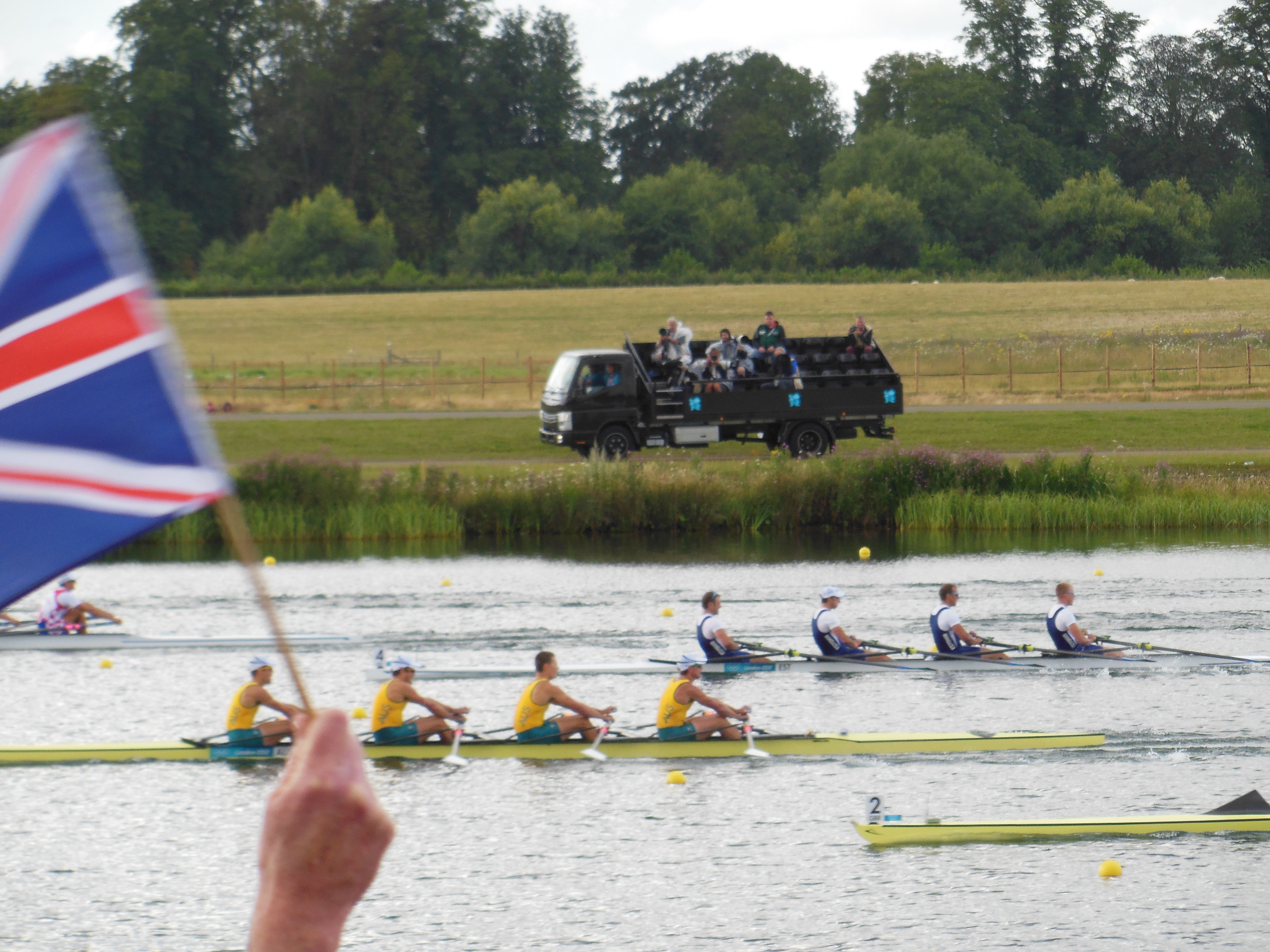
Rowing the final (left boat) of the quadruple sculls at the 2012 Summer Olympics.

Karsten Forsterling (born 21 January 1980) is an Australian former representative rower. He was a national champion, world champion, a dual Olympian and Olympic medal winner. He represented Australia at eight senior world rowing championships between 2002 and 2019 in both sculling and sweep oared boats.

== Education ==
Born in Newcastle, New South Wales, Forsterling was schooled at St Vincent's Primary in the ACT and took up rowing in high school at the Melbourne Grammar School.

He graduated from Monash University in Melbourne with a B.Engineering in 2001, and at one time worked for the multinational consulting firm AECOM.

== Club and state rowing ==
Forsterling rowed from the Melbourne University Boat Club with whom he has had a long association.

On eleven occasions during the fifteen-year period from 2001 to 2015 Forsterling was seated in Victorian men's eights which contested the King's Cup at the Australian Rowing Championships. In those crews Fosterling saw six King's Cup victories and five times placed second. In 2011 and 2016 he was also Victoria's selectee to contest the interstate men's Single scull – the President's Cup. He placed second on both occasions.

In 2011 he won he Australian national quad scull title in an Australian selection composite crew.

== International rowing career ==
At the 2010 World Rowing Championships in Karapiro he finished 3rd in the men's quadruple sculls (M4x) event, in a crew with David Crawshay, James McRae, and Daniel Noonan.

At the 2011 World Rowing Championships in an upset, Forsterling rowing in the Australian men's quad defeated the German crew to take gold. Following a costly mistake in the German boat, the Australian crew took the lead in the final metres and won the race by 0.25secs.

At the 2012 London Olympics, Forsterling won bronze in the Men's quadruple scull in a time of 5:45.22 in a crew with Chris Morgan, James McRae and Daniel Noonan.

At the 2015 World Rowing Championships on Lac d'Aiguebelette, Aiguebelette in France he finished 2nd in the men's quadruple sculls (M4x) event, rowing with David Crawshay, Cameron Girdlestone and David Watts.

In 2016 along with James McRae, Cameron Girdlestone and Alexander Belonogoff, Forsterling won the silver medal in the Australian quad at the Rio 2016 Olympics.

In 2019 after a three year absence from the Australian senior squad, an injury to James Medway following the World Rowing Cup III in Rotterdam saw Fosterling called back into the Australian eight for the 2019 World Rowing Championships in Linz, Austria. The Australian eight had made the A finals at both World Rowing Cups of 2019 and were looking for a top five finish at the 2019 World Championships to qualify for the Tokyo Olympics. The eight placed second in their heat and fourth in the final and qualified for Tokyo 2020.

== Personal ==
Forsterling announced his retirement from rowing in January 2020, aged 40. He is married to Fiona and has three children.
