= Joshua Hicks =

Australian rower (born 1991)

Josh Hicks
Personal information
- Full name: Joshua Hicks
- Nationality: Australian
- Born: Western Australia, Australia
- Years active: 2004–
- Height: 191 cm (6 ft 3 in)

Sport
- Country: Australia
- Sport: Rowing
- Events: Coxless pair, Coxless four, Coxed four
- Club: Sydney Rowing Club

Achievements and titles
- National finals: King's Cup 2014-2023
Medal record
Men's rowing
Representing Australia
World Championships
Gold medal – first place	2017 Sarasota	Coxless four
Gold medal – first place	2018 Plovdiv	Coxless four
Bronze medal – third place	2019 Ottensheim	Coxless pair
Bronze medal – third place	2023 Belgrade	Eight
World U23 Championships
Silver medal – second place	2012 Trakai	Coxless four
World Junior Championships
Silver medal – second place	2009 Brive-la-Gaillarde	Coxed four

Joshua Hicks (born 1991) is an Australian representative rower. He is an Olympian and a two-time world champion who won gold in the coxless four at the 2017 World Rowing Championships and defended that title at Plovdiv in 2018. He competed in the Australian men's coxless pair at Tokyo 2021.

== Club and state rowing ==
A Western Australian, Hicks was educated at Trinity College, Perth where he took up rowing. He won a collegiate rowing scholarship to Harvard University. There he rowed in Harvard's senior varsity eight in his second year of 2011. Following his return from Harvard and a move to New South Wales, Hicks' senior club rowing was from the Sydney Rowing Club.

Hicks' first state representation for West Australia came in 2009 when he was selected in the Western Australian youth eight to contest the Noel F Wilkinson Trophy at the Interstate Regatta within the Australian Rowing Championships. From 2014 to 2023 Hicks was selected in the Western Australian men's senior eights to contest the King's Cup at the Interstate Regatta. He stroked those WA eights in 2015, 2016, 2018, 2019 and 2021.

In 2019 he contested the men's coxless pair title at the Australian Rowing Championships with Sam Hardy and finished in third place. He again contested the coxless pair with Hardy at the 2021 Australian Rowing Championships, also competed in the coxless four event and that year won a national championship title in Sydney Rowing Club colours in the men's eight.

== International representative rowing ==
Hicks made his Australian representative debut in a coxed four at the 2009 Junior World Rowing Championships in Brive-La Gaillarde. That four won a silver medal. In 2012 at the World Rowing U23 Championships in Trakai he raced in a coxless four and again took silver. That 2012 four raced as an Australian selection crew at the 2012 Henley Royal Regatta and won the Stewards' Challenge Cup.

Senior representative honours came in 2014 when he secured a seat in the Australian men's eight. He competed at the World Rowing Cup II in Lucerne and then at the 2014 World Rowing Championships in Amsterdam where the eight placed seventh overall. In 2016 Hicks was in the Australian men's squad who were unsuccessful in attempting to qualify for the 2016 Rio Olympics at the final FISA qualification regatta. Following that attempt he raced in a coxless four and a coxless pair (with James Medway) at two of the 2016 World Rowing Cups in Europe.

In 2017 Hicks was selected into the Australian men's coxless four with Spencer Turrin and Alexander Hill who'd been medallists in the four at World Championships in 2014 and 2015 respectively and with newcomer Jack Hargreaves. They took gold at the World Rowing Cup II in Poznan and then raced in the Australian men's senior eight at the WRC III in Lucerne to a silver medal. At the 2017 World Rowing Championships in Sarasota Florida rowing as a four, they won their heat and semi-final. They flew out of the start in the final rating at 43 strokes per minute to be clear leaders at the 500m mark. They led at every mark and held off the fast finishing Italians. Australia had not won a men's coxless four world championship title since the Oarsome Foursome's 1991 win.

The world champion four stayed together into 2018 and started their 2018 international campaign with a gold medal win at the World Rowing Cup II in Linz, Austria. They repeated their 2017 tactic with a blistering rating of 43 from the start and kept it up above 40 for the rest of the race. In an Australian selection eight and racing as the Georgina Hope Rinehart National Training Centre, in honour of Rowing Australia patron, Gina Rinehart, Hicks won the 2018 Grand Challenge Cup at the Henley Royal Regatta. The fourth Australian men's eight to ever do so. The following week back in the coxless four, Hicks won another gold at the World Rowing Cup III in Lucerne. At the 2018 World Rowing Championships in Plovdiv, in the same combination as 2017, the Australian coxless four won their heat, their semi-final and just held off the fast-finishing Italians in the final to retain their world title. Hicks rowing in the bow seat, won his second world championship gold.

In 2019 Hicks was again selected in the Australian men's sweep squad for the international representative season. In an effort to qualify the men's pair for the 2020 Olympics, selectors broke up the world champion four into other boats. At the World Rowing Cup II in Poznan Hicks was seated at three behind Turrin in the Australian eight which rowed to 5th place. At WRC III in Rotterdam Hicks rowed with Sam Hardy in the number two Australian pair finishing in 7th place whilst Hill and Turrin took gold in the number one Australian coxless pair. Hicks and Hardy were selected to race Australia's coxless pair at the 2019 World Rowing Championships in Linz, Austria. The pair were looking for a top eleven finish at the 2019 World Championships to qualify for the Tokyo Olympics. They were second in their heat, won their quarter-final and placed second in their semi-final, thereby qualifying the boat for Tokyo 2020. In the A-final they finished in third place behind the dominant Sinković brothers and took the bronze medal.

At Tokyo in 2021 Hicks and Hardy dominated their heat powering though the Italians by the 1000m mark. Their fourth place in the semi-final caused them to miss the cut for the A final and in the B final the next day they again finished fourth to conclude their Olympic regatta performance in overall tenth place. Full details.

In March 2023 Hicks was again selected in the Australian senior men's sweep-oar squad for the 2023 international season. At the Rowing World Cup II in Varese Italy, Hicks raced in the Australian men's eight. In the final after a slow start they rowed through most of the field and took second place and a silver medal. At 2023's RWC III in Lucerne, Hicks moved from the bow into the two seat of the Australian men's eight. In the final they rowed stroke for stroke with their fancied Great Britain rivals but then moved away at the 1000m mark and held on for a gold medal victory. For the 2023 World Rowing Championships in Belgrade Serbia, the Australian men's eight was left unchanged and Hicks again raced in the two seat. They won their heat powering past the USA eight who had headed them at the 1000m mark. In the A final Australia and Great Britain traded the lead over the first 1000m, but beyond that point the result mirrored that of 2022 with Great Britain exerting dominance by the 1500m, fighting off a fast finishing Dutch eight who took silver and leaving the Australians with the bronze for the second successive year.
