= James Medway =

Australian rower

Personal information
- Born: 8 June 1992 (age 34)
- Years active: 2013–present

Sport
- Sport: Rowing
- Club: UTS Haberfield Rowing Club
Medal record
Men's rowing
Representing Australia
U23 World Championships
Silver medal – second place	2014 Varese	BM8+
Silver medal – second place	2013 Linz	BM4-

James Medway (born 8 June 1992) is an Australian representative rower. He was twice a silver medallist at U/23 World Championships and was a reserve for the Australian 2016 Olympic rowing squad.

== Varsity and state rowing ==
Medway was educated at Sydney Grammar School where he took up rowing. He studied and rowed at Harvard University and was seated in the Harvard men's senior eight in 2015. His Australian senior club rowing has been from the UTS Haberfield Rowing Club in Sydney.

Following his studies at Harvard, Medway made state selection for New South Wales in their 2016 men's eight which took second place in that year's King's Cup at the Interstate Regatta.

== International representative rowing ==
Medway made his Australian representative debut in the coxless four at the World Rowing U23 Championships in 2013. That crew rowed to a silver medal. In 2014 he was again selected in Australia's U23 squad and rowed in the men's eight at the World Rowing U23 Championships in Varese where he again won a silver medal.

In 2016 Medway was in the Australian men's eight who were unsuccessful in attempting to qualify for the 2016 Rio Olympics at the final FISA qualification regatta. Medway then rowed in a pair with Joshua Hicks at the 2016 World Rowing Cup III in Poznan to a ninth placing. Medway was a reserve for the Australian sweep squad for Rio 2016 and did not race at the Olympic regatta.

In 2019 Medway was selected in the Australian senior men's squad for the international representative season. At both European World Rowing Cups Medway rowed in the Australian eight. They finished fifth at the WRC II in Poznan with Medway seated at seven and finished sixth at the WRC III in Rotterdam where Medway rowed at bow. Medway was unavailable to race in the Australian men's eight at the 2019 World Rowing Championships due to injury and was replaced by the veteran Karsten Forsterling for that campaign.
