= Jared Bidwell =

Australian rower (born 1987)

Personal information
- Nationality: Australian
- Born: 13 July 1987 (age 38)

Sport
- Sport: Rowing
- Club: Uni of Queensland Rowing Club
Medal record
Men's rowing
Representing Australia
World Rowing Championships
Silver medal – second place	2009 Poznań	M4x

Jared Bidwell (born 13 July 1987 in Hamilton, Queensland) is an Australian rower. He was a Queensland state representative in both sculling and sweep-oared boats and an Australian silver-medal winning representative at world championships.

== Club and state rowing ==
Bidwell was educated at the Anglican Church Grammar School where he took up rowing. His senior club rowing was done from the University of Queensland Boat Club.

His first state selection for Queensland came in 2006 as stroke of the youth eight competing for the Noel F Wilkinson Trophy at the Interstate Regatta within the Australian Rowing Championships. In 2007 he again stroked the Queensland youth eight and they achieved a second place at the Interstate Regatta. In 2008 he was selected in the Queensland senior men's eight competing for the King's Cup. He raced in further Queensland King's Cupattempts in 2010, 2011 and 2012. In those same years 2010 to 2012 he was also the Queensland single sculls representative racing for the President's Cup at the Interstate Regatta.

In QUBC colours he contested national championship titles at the Australian Rowing Championships on numerous occasions including the open men's single and double sculls titles in 2009 and the singles sculls championships 2010 and 2012.

== International representative rowing ==
Bidwell's Australian representative debut came in 2008 at the World Rowing U23 Championships in Brandenburg, Germany in a quad scull which placed fifth.

At the 2009 World Rowing Championships in Poznań he finished 2nd in the men's quadruple sculls (M4x) event, along with Nick Hudson, David Crawshay, and Daniel Noonan. In 2010 Bidwell raced in a double scull with Nick Hudson. They were well outside the final placings at two World Rowing Cups they contested in Europe that year but lifted for the 2010 World Rowing Championships at Lake Karapiro, made the A Final and finished in overall fifth place. That race would prove to be his last Australian world championship appearance.

Bidwell raced a men's single scull at the World Rowing Cup III in 2011 and attempted to qualify a single scull at the last minute Olympic qualification regatta in May 2012. He was vying for a seat in the Australian crewed sculls for the 2012 London Olympics but missed selection and raced in a double scull with Scott Brennan at the World Rowing Cup III in Lucerne that year. He was a reserve for the 2012 Olympic heavyweight sculling squad.
