= Cherry Blyde =

New Zealand rugby union administrator and player

- Born: Cheryth Dianne Sutton; 14 December 1966 (age 59) Hāwera, New Zealand
- Height: 1.67 m (5 ft 6 in)
- Weight: 60 kg (132 lb)
- Notable relatives: Michaela Blyde (daughter); Liam Blyde (son); Michael Brake (son-in-law)

Rugby union career
- Position: Midfield back
Provincial / State sides
Years	Team	Apps	(Points)
	Taranaki		(0)
International career
Years	Team	Apps	(Points)
1992	New Zealand	1	(0)

Cheryth Dianne Blyde (née Sutton; born 14 December 1966) is a New Zealand rugby union administrator and former player.

== Rugby career ==
Blyde grew up in Normanby in south Taranaki. She converted to rugby after missing out on Taranaki's netball team in 1989.

Blyde made only one appearance for the Black Ferns on 30 August 1992, it was against an Auckland XV's side at Auckland. It was the first official women's game organised, sanctioned and paid for by the then, NZRFU.

Blyde transitioned into coaching to assist her twin boys. She had a stint as a Secondary Schools liaison officer for Taranaki Rugby between 2013 and 2016.

In 2022, she became Taranaki's first female president in its 136-year history, she previously served as vice-president for the union.

She is the mother of Black Ferns sevens star, Michaela Blyde.
