= Nick Hudson =

Australian rower

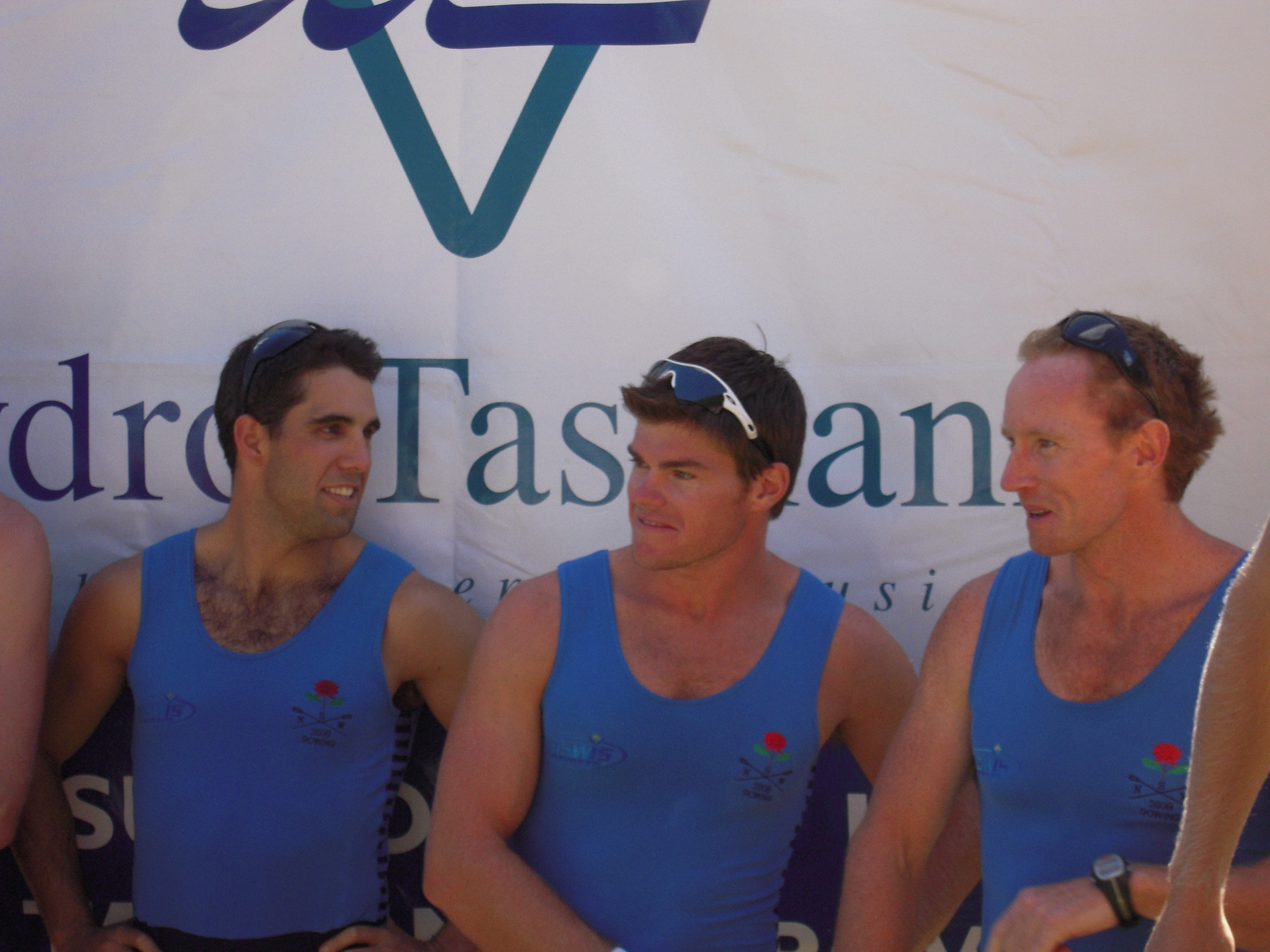
- Hudson (left), Sam Loch and Dan Noonan after the New South Wales King's Cup victory of 2009.

Personal information
- Born: 7 October 1983 (age 42) Sydney
- Years active: 1998–2015

Sport
- Country: Australia
- Sport: Rowing
- Club: Sydney University Boat Club.
Medal record
Men's rowing
Representing Australia
World Rowing Championships
Silver medal – second place	2009 Poznań	M4x
U23 World Championships
Gold medal – first place	2003 Belgrade	M4x
Bronze medal – third place	2004 Poznan	M4x

Nick Hudson (born 7 October 1983, in Sydney) is an Australian former rower. He was an U23 world champion, an Australian national champion and was a silver medallist at the 2009 World Championships.

== Club and state rowing ==
Hudson was educated at The King's School, Parramatta where he took up rowing. He stroked the school's first VIII in 2000 to a 5th placing at the AAGPS Head of the River. The following year he was in the King's School's successful first VIII of 2001 – along with other future Australian representatives Matt Ryan and Sam Loch – which won at the AAGPS Head of the River. The crew went on to win the Barrington Cup at the National Championships and the Princess Elizabeth Challenge Cup at Henley Royal Regatta later that year.

Hudson's senior club rowing was from the Sydney University Boat Club.

Domestically while racing for his state, New South Wales, Hudson has won the Noel F Wilkinson Cup for Youth Eights in 2003, stroking the crew to a win by almost five seconds. He made his Kings Cup debut for New South Wales in 2007 placing 2nd behind Victoria. Hudson returned to the New South Wales Kings Cup crew in 2009, recording a dominant victory by over five seconds. Hudson won his second Kings Cup in 2010 and was selected in the crew again in 2012, where New South Wales won, making Hudson a three-time winner of the event.

== International representative rowing ==
Hudson first represented for Australia in 2003. He raced in a quad scull World Rowing Cup III in Lucerne before contesting the Nations Cup (now the World Rowing U23 Championships) in Belgrade, Serbia. Hudson was in a quad scull with Eugene Arendsen, Henry Gundry and Tom Westgarth which won a gold medal. At the 2004 World Rowing U23 Championships Hudson was again a member of the Australian Quad Scull, this time winning the bronze medal.

Five years later, Hudson made his debut in the Australian senior team, winning a silver medal at the 2009 World Rowing Championships in Poznan, Poland. Hudson again made the A Final the following year at the 2010 World Rowing Championships at Lake Karapiro, New Zealand. Racing in a men's double scull with Jared Bidwell, they placed fifth.

At the 2011 World Rowing Championships in Bled, Slovenia, Hudson competed in the men's single scull giving him senior national representation across the full range of sculling boats in the space of just three years. He placed eighteenth in what would be his last World Championship appearance for Australia.

He was vying for a seat in the Australian men's eight for the 2012 London Olympics but missed selection and raced in a coxless pair with Fergus Pragnell at the World Rowing Cups II and III in Europe that year and was a reserve for the Olympic heavyweight squad. In 2014 he competed in the double scull and the quad at the World Rowing Cup I in Sydney, winning gold in the quad. Hudson announced his retirement from competitive rowing in March 2015, on the eve of the Australian Rowing Championships.
