= Blyde Smit =

South African actress

- Born: Blyde Smit; 1995 (age 30–31); Johannesburg, South Africa
- Education: University of Pretoria
- Occupations: Actress, Production designer
- Years active: 2007–present
- Height: 172 cm (5 ft 8 in)

Blyde Smit (born 1995) is a South African actress and production designer. She is best known for her roles in the series Dead Places, The Construct and 7de Laan.

== Personal life ==
Smit was born in 1995 in Johannesburg, South Africa. In 2014, she entered University of Pretoria to study drama, where she graduated with a bachelor's degree in drama in 2016. Then in 2017 she completed her honors degree in Drama and Film Studies from the same university.

== Career ==
In 2007, she made her television debut with the SABC2 's drama series Erfsondes, where she played the role "Kate" in the first two seasons until 2009. During her life at Pretoria in 2015, she performed in many theatre productions such as; Shedding the Load, Flikflooi and Still. In 2017, she performed in the plays; Kersfees and Koue Tee deur. In 2019, she joined the cast of popular SBC2 soap opera 7de Laan with the role "Gabby Kemp". Then in 2021, she appeared in the serial Dead Places. She is currently featuring in the Showmax show Troukoors (Wedding Fever) as Luca.

== Filmography ==
Year	Film	Role	Genre	Ref.
2019–2021	7de Laan	Gabby Kemp	TV series	
2021	Dead Places	Rebecca	TV series	
2022	Troukoors	Luca		
TBD	The Construct	Production designer	Film	
