= Michaela Blyde =

New Zealand rugby sevens & rugby league player

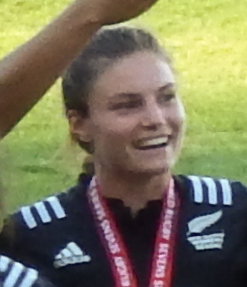
- Blyde at the 2017 France Women's Sevens

Personal information
- Born: 29 December 1995 (age 30) New Plymouth, New Zealand
- Education: New Plymouth Girls' High School
- Height: 1.65 m (5 ft 5 in)
- Weight: 65 kg (143 lb)
- Spouse: Michael Brake (m. 2025)
- Relatives: Cherry Blyde (mother); Liam Blyde (brother)

Rugby union career
National sevens team
Years	Team	Comps
2013–	New Zealand	236 apps

Sport
- Rugby league career

Playing information
- Position: Wing
Club
Years	Team	Pld	T	G	FG	P
2025–	NZ Warriors Women	4	2	0	0	8
- As of 29 September 2025
Medal record
Women's rugby sevens
Representing New Zealand
Olympic Games
Gold medal – first place	2024 Paris	Team competition
Gold medal – first place	2020 Tokyo	Team competition
Commonwealth Games
Gold medal – first place	2018 Gold Coast	Team competition
Bronze medal – third place	2022 Birmingham	Team competition
Rugby World Cup Sevens
Gold medal – first place	2018 San Francisco	Team competition
Silver medal – second place	2022 Cape Town	Team competition

Michaela Brake (née Blyde; born 29 December 1995) is a New Zealand professional rugby sevens player and a double Olympic gold medalist. She was the first female player to win back-to-back World Rugby Sevens Player of the Year titles, in 2017 and 2018. Blyde holds the record for the most tries by a New Zealand women sevens player in a single match (six against Sri Lanka at the 2022 Commonwealth Games) and also the record for most tries in a single fixture when she scored five tries against England in Langford in 2017. Blyde has won gold medals at the 2018 Sevens World Cup, 2018 Commonwealth Games, 2020 Tokyo Olympics, 2024 Paris Olympics, and six Sevens titles. In January 2025, Blyde became the second woman to score 250 tries in the HSBC international sevens competition. She is currently the series' leading all-time women’s try scorer and the series' all-time women's second highest points scorer.

== Early life, education and family ==
Blyde was born on 29 December 1995 in New Plymouth to Cherry (née Sutton) and Stephen Blyde. Her father, Stephen, played halfback for local club Clifton and provincial rugby for the Taranaki Colts while her mother Cherry played representative rugby for Taranaki, played for the Black Ferns in 1992 and in 2022 became the first female president of the Taranaki rugby football union. Both parents also represented New Zealand at touch rugby.

Blyde was raised on the family's dairy farm at Lepperton and educated at New Plymouth Girls' High School. From 2009 to 2013, she competed in athletics in the 100 metres, 200 metres and long jump. In 2009 and 2010, she participated in the 100 and 200 metres at New Zealand Secondary Schools' Championships.

Blyde's younger brothers, Liam and Cole were academy rugby players with Taranaki. Liam went on to be selected for a development project for the men's Sevens team before playing for the Taranaki Bulls in 2021.

In 2014, Blyde commenced a Bachelor of Sport and Exercise degree through correspondence at Massey University. In 2017, she studied for a Certificate in Animal Care at Otago Polytechnic in Dunedin.

== Rugby career ==
When she was young her parents encouraged her and her brothers to play for their local rugby union club, Clifton. "Rugby was my first sport as a five-year-old, but when I got to the age where we had to start tackling, I was a bit scared of playing with the boys" and so she switched at the age of eight to playing football. She began playing it again in year 12 at high school, though football was her first priority.

In 2012 the New Zealand Rugby Union organised a "Go for Gold" campaign to identify talent with the potential to represent New Zealand in the Sevens competition at the Rio Olympics. Cherie Blyde who was employed at the time by Taranaki Rugby as a Rugby Development Officer made her daughter who had just recommenced playing rugby, attend one of the open trials.

At the trial she was put through various fitness, rugby skill and character assessment activities. Blyde was heavily involved in playing football at the time and was upset when attendance at a second trial meant missing out on a football tournament. Of the 800 who attended a trial, Blyde along with Gayle Broughton and Lauren Bayens from Taranaki were among the 30 deemed promising who attended a training camp at Waiouru in mid-2012.

=== Debuts for the New Zealand sevens team ===
Blyde's superior speed, meant that at 17 years of age and still at high school she debuted for the New Zealand Sevens at the 2013 Oceania Women's Sevens Championship in Noosa, Australia in October 2013. Because of her age Blyde had to be given special dispensation to play in the tournament. As she commenced her warmed-up for her first game she noticed her father on the sidelines. He had without telling her flown over from New Zealand to surprise her, which caused her to break down and begin crying before she ran to give him a hug. Blyde found it daunting playing alongside and against experienced players at a national and international level. In the playoff for third place against Samoa she scored five tries.

Alongside representing New Zealand Blyde played for her school in the 2013 Condor Sevens, which was the first time New Plymouth Girls' High had fielded a team in this National Secondary Schools Rugby Sevens competition. Competing against 16 other teams New Plymouth made it to the final, only to lose to Hamilton Girls. Blyde was named Player of the Tournament and was also selected for the tournament team. Outside of school she also played in regional competitions and for Taranaki in national competitions in 2013. Blyde played for the Taranaki team in the National Sevens competition in January 2014 where they came fifth.

Immediately upon leaving school Blyde was offered a national training contract for 2014, and in February of that year, at the age of 18, she scored a try on her debut for New Zealand in their game against the Netherlands in Atlanta tournament of the Rugby World Sevens Series.

=== 2016 Rio Olympic Games ===
Along with Shiray Tane she was one of the two travelling reserves for the Rio Games, which required them to stay in accommodation outside of the Olympic village away from the rest of the team. Following the disappointment of not making the playing side Blyde made significant changes to improve her performance. After commencing the 2016–2017 Women's World Sevens Series with only a one-year contract Blyde was to end the season with 40 points and the title of the series' top try-scorer, which assisted New Zealand in winning the series title. Her performance led to Blyde being named 2017 World Rugby Women's Sevens Player of the year.

Over the course of the 2017–2018 Women's World Sevens Series Blyde scored 27 tries and was named World Rugby Women's Sevens Player of the year in 2018, becoming the first women's player to win it not only twice, but in consecutive years.

In 2018, she won gold medals at both the Commonwealth Games and the Rugby World Cup Sevens. In the latter she scored the most tries (nine) and the most points. In the final of the World Cup Blyde scored three tries as part of her contribution to New Zealand beating France 29–0.

=== 2020 Tokyo Olympic Games ===
At the Tokyo Olympics in 2021 Blyde scored seven tries in five matches, including in the final, which New Zealand won, earning her a gold medal.

=== 2022 Commonwealth Games and World Cup ===
Blyde was named in the Black Ferns Sevens squad for the 2022 Commonwealth Games in Birmingham. She won a bronze medal at the Commonwealth Games.

She later won a silver medal at the 2022 Rugby World Cup Sevens in Cape Town.

=== 2023–2024 Seven series season ===
On 10 December 2023 during her team's win over Canada in the quarter-final of the Cape Town tournament of the HSBC SVNS World Series Blyde became the second women to score 200 tries in the HSBC international sevens competition.

At the Hong Kong tournament on 5–7 April 2024 she competed in her fiftieth international sevens tournament (including Commonwealth Games and Olympic Games). At the time only six other women had reached this milestone, among the others being Charlotte Caslick, Chloé Pelle, Sharni Williams and Portia Woodman. She celebrated the occasion with three tries in the final as part of her contribution to New Zealand's 36–7 demolition of the United States. As a result, she became the first player of either sex to score three tries five times in a world series final. This bought her score up to a total of 28 tries in Seven series finals, trailing Portia Woodman who had scored 33. She was named player of the final.

At the 2024 Singapore Sevens tournament on 3–5 May 2024 she again scored a hat-trick in the final as part of her contribution to New Zealand's 31–21 win over Australia. This meant she became the first player of either sex to score three tries six times in a world series final. Singapore was the last tournament in the 2023–24 seven league series and bought her total to 52 tries (which was 27%) out of the 192 tries scored by New Zealand.

Blyde ended the 2023–24 season having played 45 games and scored 53 tries.

=== 2024 Paris Olympics ===
On 20 June 2024 it was announced that she had been selected as a member of the New Zealand Women’s Rugby Sevens team for the Paris Olympics. During pool play against Canada Blyde required seven stitches in her forehead after she made contact with Canadian player Charity Williams. The injury didn't prevent her from playing in all of the remaining games. Blyde scored 10 tries over the course of the Olympic sevens competition to make her the second highest try scorer. One of her tries was in the final against Canada which was won by New Zealand 19–12 to give her back-to-back Olympic gold medals.

=== 2024–2025 Seven series season ===
Following the Olympics Blyde took a break from international rugby for the remainder of 2024 and thus missed the first two tournaments of the 2024-2025 sevens series season. Blyde's return at the Perth tournament held on 24–26 January 2025, saw her score four tries in the semi-final against France. Two of these were sufficient for her to become the second woman to score 250 tries in the HSBC international sevens competition.

At the Vancouver tournament held on 21–23 February 2025 Blyde scored five tries in the first eight minutes of the team’s pool match against Ireland to pass Portia Woodman’s record of 256 tries and become the Seven series all-time leading women’s try scorer. She scored 10 tries over the course of the tournament.

She ended the series with a career total of 273 tries.

=== Move to rugby league ===
In December 2024, Blyde announced she had signed a one-year contract to play for the Warriors in the NRLW in 2025. "I'm excited to be a part of something that's growing super, super quickly and you'd be silly not to want to be involved in it," she said. She made her debut for the Warriors in their game against the 6 July 2025 against the Sydney Roosters. In her second game for the team she equalled the NRLW record for most tackle breaks in a game. In total she made four appearances before she discovered h she was pregnant and withdrew from playing. During her period with the Warriors, which were all spent on the wing she scored two tries.

=== Return to sevens ===
In late 2025 while still pregnant she signed a new contract with New Zealand rugby that committed her to play for them through to the end of 2027.

== Personal life ==
On 4 January 2025 at Ohauiti in the Bay of Plenty, Blyde married her long term partner, Olympic gold medallist rower Michael Brake.

On 25 March 2026 she gave birth to Harvey Christopher Stephen Brake.

== Awards and honours ==
- 2017, Canada Sevens Langford dream team.
- 2017, World Rugby Women's Sevens Player of the Year.
- 2018, World Rugby Women's Sevens Player of the Year.
- 2018, Taranaki Sports Awards Sportswoman of the Year and Overall Sportsperson of the Year.
- 2019, Australian Women's Sevens performance tracker player of the round.
- 2021, Joint winner of Taranaki Daily News Person of the Year 2021 with Gayle Broughton.
- 2023, Member of that years women's rugby sevens dream team.
- 2024, Taranaki Sports Awards Sportswoman of the Year and Overall Sportsperson of the Year.
