= Nicholas Hudson (publisher) =

Australian writer and publisher (c. 1933–2018)

Nicholas John Hudson (c. 1933 – 1 March 2018) was an Australian author and publisher, founder of Heinemann (Australia) Pty Ltd.

== History ==
Hudson was born and educated in England and read Classics at Trinity House, Oxford university.

In 1958 he was commissioned by William Heinemann Ltd to establish an educational book department in Melbourne, which in 1964 was incorporated as Heinemann Educational Australia Pty Ltd, with Hudson as managing director of the umbrella company Heinemann Publishers Australia.

Hudson left Heinemann in 1985 to found his own publishing house, N. S. Hudson Publishing Services Pty Ltd, based in Newstead, a country town near Castlemaine, Victoria.

He became internationally famous as a result of his decision in 1987 to publish Peter Wright's memoir Spycatcher, which was banned in England, then taking it to the world at the Book Fair in Frankfurt, Germany.

He was the author of Modern Australian Usage: A Practical Guide for Writers and Editors, published in 1993, and based on Fowler's Modern English Usage.

His other works include (as "C. Below") the comically satirical The Vedgymight History of Australia. (Note: The Vedgymight History of Australia "contains concentrated history extract" (1983) ISBN 0858593416)
