= Michael Brake =

New Zealand rower (born 1994)

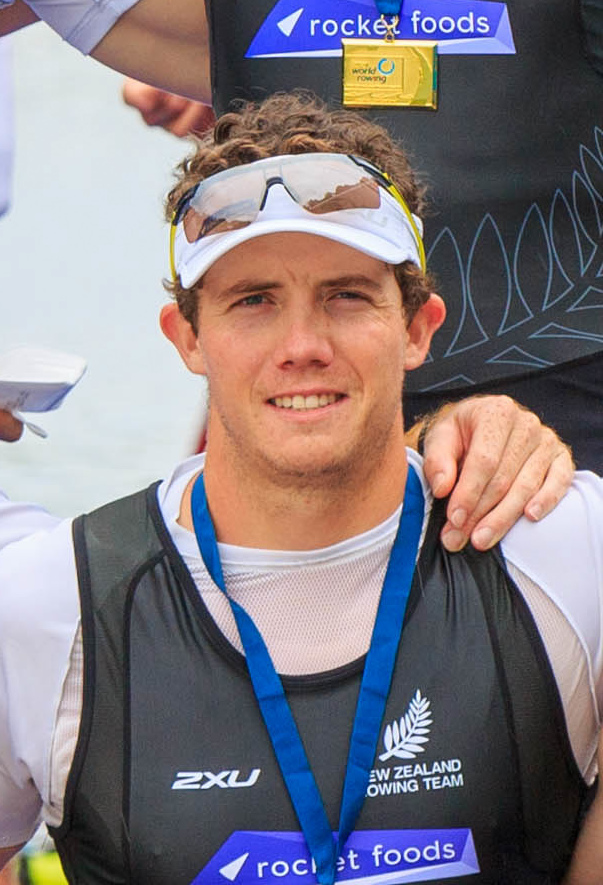
- Brake in 2021

Personal information
- Born: 22 October 1994 (age 32) Auckland, New Zealand
- Education: Westlake Boys High School
- Height: 1.87 m (6 ft 2 in)
- Weight: 88 kg (194 lb)
- Spouse: Michaela Blyde (m. 2025)

Sport
- Country: New Zealand
- Sport: Rowing
- Event: Coxless pair
Medal record
Men's rowing
Representing New Zealand
Olympic Games
Gold medal – first place	2020 Tokyo	Eight
World Championships
Silver medal – second place	2019 Ottensheim	Coxless pair

Michael Brake (born 22 October 1994) is a New Zealand rower. He is a dual Olympian and won Olympic gold at Tokyo 2020.

Brake has been rowing internationally since 2012 and in that year, won a world championship at the World Rowing Junior Championships. At the 2014 World Rowing U23 Championships, he won silver. At the 2016 Rio Olympics, he competed with the New Zealand eight and competed in the same boat class at 2020 Tokyo. In the interim Olympiad, he competed internationally in the coxless pair and won silver at the 2019 World Rowing Championships partnered with Tom Murray. Domestically, he has won seven national premier rowing titles. Brake, who is from Auckland's North Shore, graduated with a civil engineering degree from Auckland University.

== Early life ==
Brake was born in Auckland, New Zealand. He received his education at Westlake Boys High School on the city's North Shore in the suburb of Forrest Hill. He took up rowing in 2008 at his school aged 13. In 2024, he graduated with a Bachelor of Engineering at the University of Auckland.

== Career ==
After taking up rowing in 2008, it was not until 2012 that Brake first competed at the New Zealand Rowing Championships as a member of the North Shore Rowing Club. He competed in two boat classes in finals and won both races: one with the club eight and the other with the U19 coxed four. Brake was selected for the New Zealand junior rowing team based on those results and he first rowed internationally at the 2012 World Rowing Junior Championships, which were held in Plovdiv, Bulgaria, in conjunction with the 2012 World Rowing Championships. The coxed four, which included Tom Murray and coxswain Sam Bosworth, won gold at that regatta.

At the February 2013 New Zealand rowing championships, Brake competed in three senior boat classes, and came second with the eight and won gold with both the coxless pair and the coxless four. This being his final year at his secondary school, he did not participate in international rowing.

At the February 2014 New Zealand rowing championships, he competed in five boat classes, including his first appearance in the premier class. (Note: Premier is the highest ability class and rowers can compete in this class once they have been accepted by one of the Regional Performance Centres (RPCs).) In the coxless pair, he competed (with different partners) in both the U20 and U22 categories and won gold and bronze, respectively. In the U20 coxless four, he won silver. In the U22 eight, he won gold. In the premier eight, he came fourth. Based on this performance, he was picked for the country's U23 team and competed at the 2014 World Rowing U23 Championships in Varese, Italy, where he won silver with the U23 coxed four.

At the February 2015 New Zealand rowing championships, Brake competed in three boat classes and won his first national title in the premier men category. With the U22 coxless four, he won gold. With the premier eight, he came fourth. He picked up his first premier title with the coxed four, with different team members to those he won silver with at the world championships the previous year. He was called into the elite team for the year and went to the 2015 World Rowing Cups II and III with the eight, in Varese (Italy) and at the Swiss Rotsee, respectively. They came fourth in Italy and won bronze in Switzerland. At the 2015 World Rowing Championships, the men's eight was beaten for a bronze medal by the Netherlands by 0.13 seconds. This result qualified this boat class for the 2016 Rio Olympics.

At the February 2016 New Zealand rowing championships, Brake competed in three boat classes. With the U22 coxless pair, he won gold. In the premier eight, he won silver. With the premier coxed four, he defended his national title. Internationally, he remained a member of the New Zealand eight. In preparation for the Olympics, they travelled to the 2016 World Rowing Cup II on the Swiss Rotsee, they came fifth. At the World Rowing Cup III in Poznań, Poland, they won bronze. The team came sixth at the Olympic competition in Rio de Janeiro. The last time a New Zealand eight had even qualified for the Olympics had been at the 1984 Los Angeles Olympics, 32 years prior.

At the 2017 New Zealand rowing nationals at Lake Ruataniwha, he competed with the premier coxed four but the team did not complete the A-final. Although the New Zealand national rowing team competed at 2017 World Rowing Cups II and III in Europe, Brake did not participate but was announced for the New Zealand eight at the 2017 World Rowing Championships in Sarasota, Florida. The eight finished in sixth place.

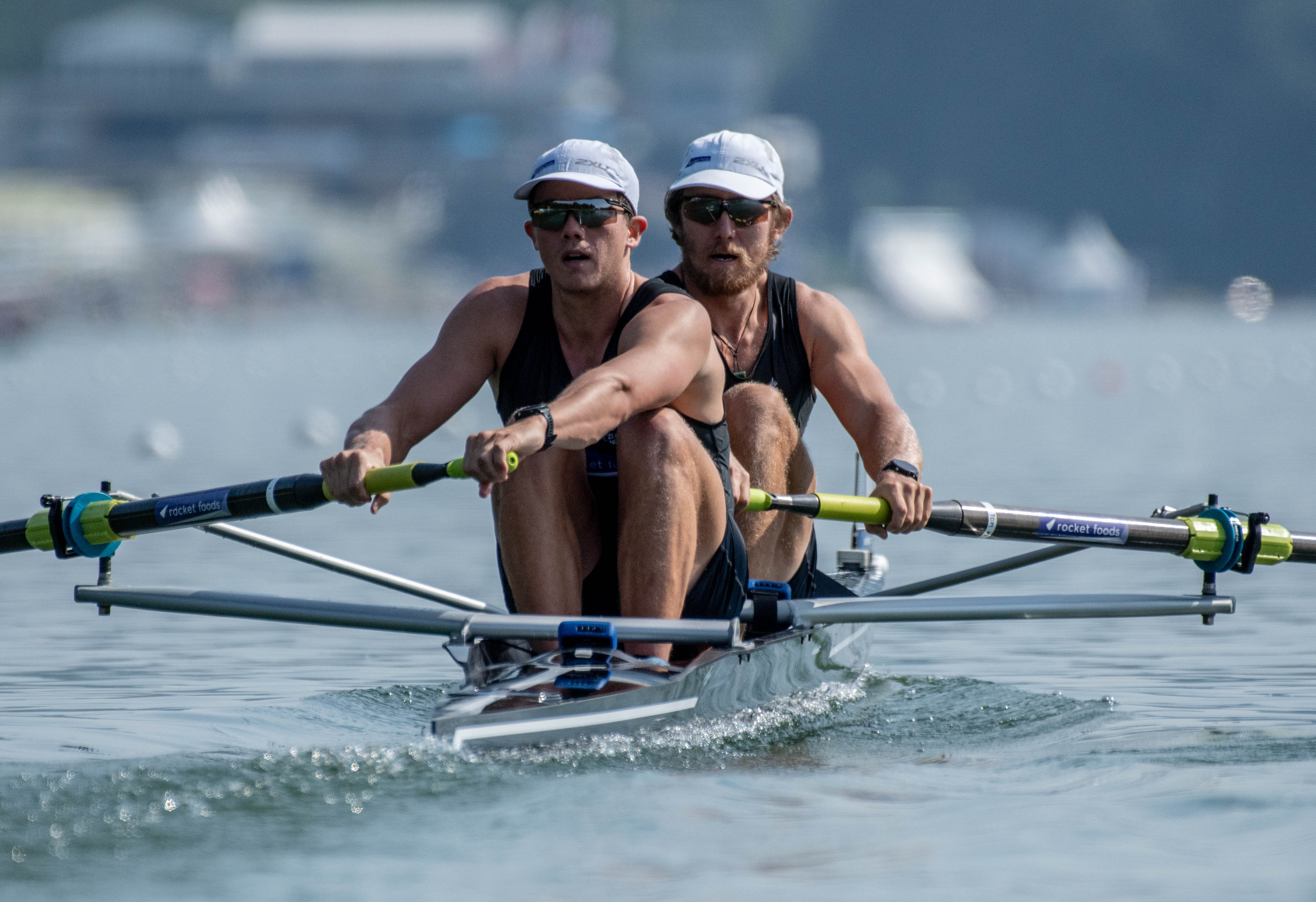
Tom Murray (in the bow) and Brake (as stroke) competing in 2019

At the February 2018 New Zealand rowing championships, Brake competed in three premier boat classes. He won gold with the coxless four, bronze with the eight, and came fourth with Cameron Webster in the coxless pair. For international rowing, Brake was teamed up with Tom Murray in the coxless pair. Within five days around Easter 2018, both of them broke bones; Brake broke his wrist when he slipped on cobblestones and Murray broke a toe when he had a mishap on a sea biscuit. Brake had plates inserted to stabilise his wrist. Whilst they travelled to 2018 World Rowing Cup II in Linz-Ottensheim, Austria, they did not compete. At the 2018 World Rowing Cup III at the Rotsee, they won gold. At the 2018 World Rowing Championships in Plovdiv, Bulgaria, they came fifth.

At the February 2019 New Zealand rowing championships, Brake competed in three premier boat classes. He won gold with the coxless four and the eight, and bronze in double scull with Stephen Jones. Continuing to row internationally with Murray, they won silver at World Rowing Cup II in Poznań and bronze at World Rowing Cup III in Rotterdam, Netherlands. At the 2019 World Rowing Championships in Linz-Ottensheim, Austria, they won silver, beaten by the Croatian Sinković brothers Martin and Valent for gold. This result qualified this boat class for the 2020 Tokyo Olympics.

At the February 2020 New Zealand rowing championships, Brake competed in two boat classes. He came second with the coxless four and third alongside Webster in the coxless pair. Due to the COVID-19 pandemic, there was no international rowing during 2020.

At the February 2021 New Zealand rowing championships, Brake competed in four boat classes. He became national champion with the coxless four and the eight. He won silver alongside Dan Williamson in the coxless pair. He placed sixth in the quad scull. In March 2021, Rowing New Zealand announced the elite team for the Olympic year and Brake was placed in the eight that had yet to qualify for the Games. At the Final Olympic Qualification Regatta at the Rotsee in May 2021, the top two teams gained qualification (four teams competed) and the New Zealand eight won both the preliminary race and the final. When New Zealand's Olympic team was announced in June 2021, Brake was confirmed to start with the eight. He won gold in the men's eights event at the 2020 Olympic Games.

=== National titles ===
National titles for senior rowers are known as Red Coats in New Zealand. As of 2021, Brake has won seven premier Red Coats.

Red Coats – New Zealand premier national titles
Coxed four	2015, 2016
Coxless four	2018, 2019, 2021
Eight	2019, 2021

== Personal life ==
On 4 January 2025 at Ohauiti in the Bay of Plenty, Brake married his long-term partner, rugby player Michaela Blyde.
