= Freek Robbers =

Dutch rower (born 1990)

Personal information
- Born: 26 December 1990 (age 35)

Sport
- Sport: Rowing
- Club: Nereus, Amsterdam
Medal record
Men's rowing
Representing the Netherlands
European Rowing Championships
Silver medal – second place	2018 Glasgow	Men’s eight

Freek Robbers (born 26 December 1990) is a former Dutch rower.

He won the silver medal at the 2018 European Rowing Championships in the men's eight. He competed at the 2017, 2018 and 2019 World Rowing Championships.

Robbers didn't qualify for the 2012 Summer Olympics. As a university student he competed at the 2013 Summer Universiade in the men's double sculls in Kazan, Russia.
