= Samuel Loch =

Australian rower (born 1983)

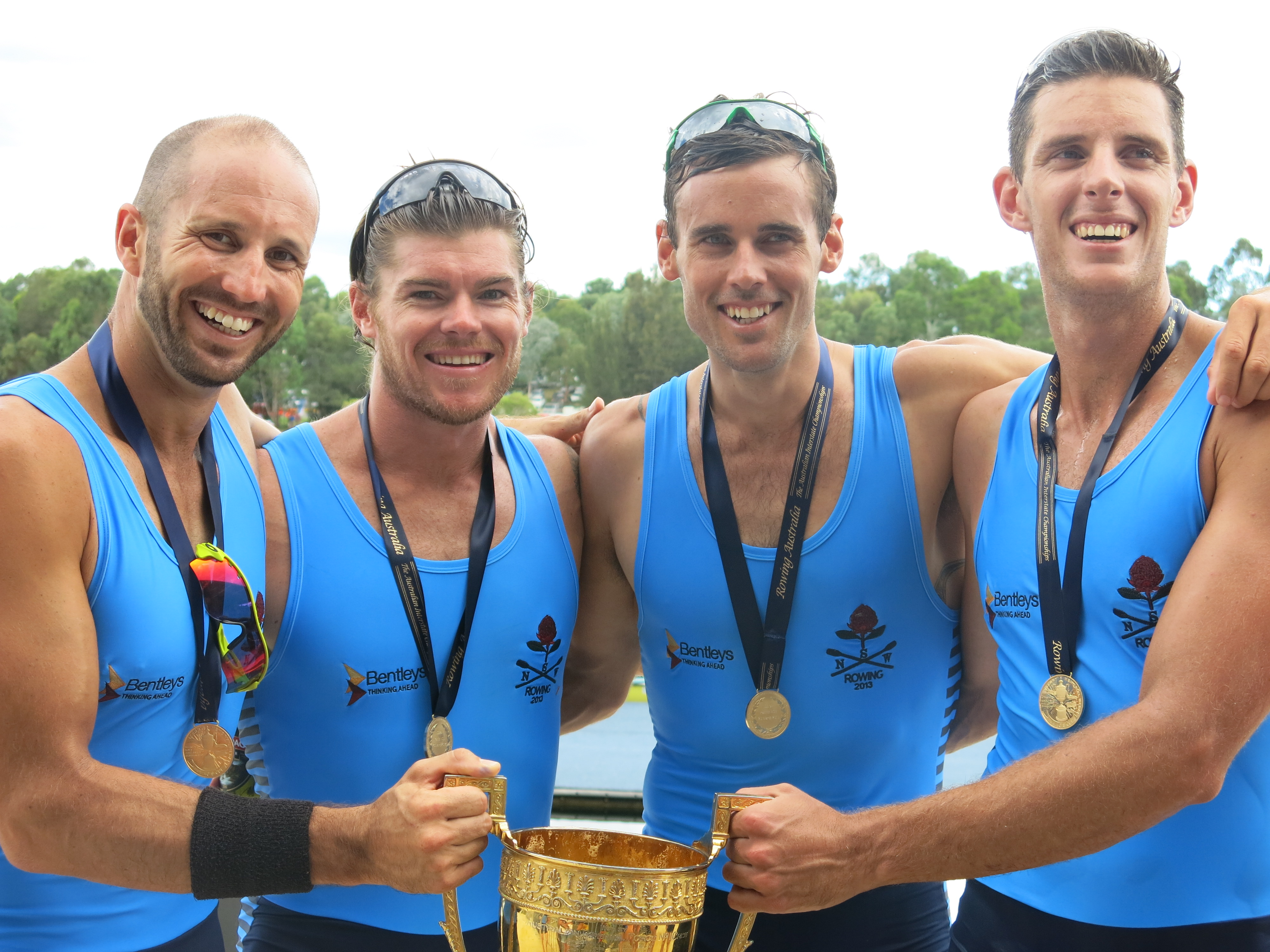
- James Chapman, Samuel Loch, Matt Ryan and Fergus Pragnell after winning the Kings Cup in 2013. It was the 6th time that each of these athletes won the event.

Personal information
- Born: 26 June 1983 (age 43) Sydney, Australia
- Height: 186 cm (6 ft 1 in)
- Weight: 112 kg (247 lb)

Sport
- Sport: Rowing
- College team: Princeton University
- Club: UTS Haberfield Rowing Club
Medal record
Representing Australia
Men's rowing
World Rowing Championships
Bronze medal – third place	2010 Karapiro	M8+
Bronze medal – third place	2011 Bled	M4-

Samuel Loch (born 26 June 1983) is an Australian former representative rower. A dual Olympian and two time bronze medal winner at World Championships, he has set and holds world records in indoor rowing with times set on the Concept 2 rowing machine.

== Education ==
Loch began his rowing at The King's School in Sydney and was in the stroke seat of the school's 2001 First VIII which won 28 races from 28 starts including the AAGPS Head of the River. This crew also contained future Australian senior national rowers Nicholas Hudson and Matt Ryan, and went on to win the Princess Elizabeth Challenge Cup at the 2001 Henley Royal Regatta.

Loch studied and rowed at Princeton University from which he graduated in 2006.

== Club and state rowing ==
Domestically Loch enjoyed great success as a member of the New South Wales King's Cup crew. Loch was a member of the crew in 2008 which defeated holders, Victoria, by just 0.21 seconds in a win that saw New South Wales start their own winning streak from 2008 to 2014 inclusive. Loch recorded six wins in this event from 2008 to 2013. His senior club in Sydney was the UTS Haberfield Rowing Club.

== International representative rowing ==
Loch made his Australian team debut at the 2007 World Rowing Championships in Munich, Germany. Competing in the Men's Coxless Four, his crew placed 12th.

In 2008 he made his Olympic debut in Beijing, China as part of the Men's Eight crew which placed 6th.

Loch continued internationally in the Men's Eight, with a 7th placing at the 2009 World Rowing Championships in Poznan, Poland. In 2010 he won his first World Championship medal (Bronze) at the 2010 World Rowing Championships at Lake Karapiro, New Zealand. Loch moved into the Men's Coxless Four at the 2011 World Rowing Championships in Bled, Slovenia where he also won a Bronze medal.

At the 2012 London Olympic Games, Loch was in the seven seat of the Australian Men's Eight which placed 6th in a thrilling final where all boats finished within a length of each other.

== Indoor records ==
In 2013, Loch took a break from international competition and during this period set a 24-hour tandem world record on the Concept 2 rowing machine (ergometer) with his King's Cup partner Matt Ryan. The pair covered 380.274 kilometres, maintaining an average split of 1:53.6 per 500 metres. The successful world record attempt was also a fundraiser for the Leukaemia Foundation and raised almost $20,000 AUD for the charity.

In 2015, Loch placed 2nd at the World Indoor Rowing Championships behind Angel Fournier Rodriguez of Cuba.

Loch is the current world record holder for 1000 metres on the Concept 2 Ski Erg with 2:54.4 set in early 2016. In July 2016, Loch also broke an 11-year-old world record on the Concept 2 Rowing Ergometer for 1000 metres with a time of 2:39.5. In December that year, Loch produced yet another record breaking performance, 'Most Metres Rowed in One Minute' on Concept2 rower, with 425m (a 500m split of 1:10.5).

== Personal ==
Loch is married to Frances Abbott, daughter of former Australian Prime Minister Tony Abbott.

== See also ==
- List of Princeton University Olympians
