= 2018 World Rowing Cup =

Season of an international rowing event

The 2018 World Rowing Cup was held over three regattas, or stages, from 1 June to 15 July 2018.

== Stage 1 ==
The first event of the 2018 World Rowing Cup took place in Belgrade, Serbia, 1–3 June 2018.

=== Medal summary ===
Event:	Gold:	Time	Silver:	Time	Bronze:	Time
Men's events
LM1x	Germany 1	06:58.43	Switzerland	07:06.17	Germany 2	07:06.48
LM2x	Poland	06:13.04	Belgium	06:14.09	Ireland	06:14.10
LM4x	Czech Republic	06:06.07	Hungary	06:08.01		
M1x	Czech Republic	06:44.82	Switzerland	06:45.59	Germany 2	06:46.23
M2-	Croatia	06:19.37	Czech Republic	06:20.99	Belarus	06:23.36
M2x	Lithuania 1	06:08.29	Great Britain	06:09.08	Germany	06:10.70
M4-	Netherlands 2	05:51.05	Netherlands 1	05:52.41	Belarus	05:52.42
M4x	Great Britain	05:38.86	Germany	05:39.13	Norway	05:41.65
M8+	Germany	05:24.91	Great Britain	05:26.01	Romania	05:31.48
PR1 M1x	Ukraine	10:12.04	Great Britain	10:30.77	Belgium	11:21.49
PR2 Mix2x	Netherlands	08:42.13	Ukraine	09:13.37		
Women's events
LW1x	Belarus	07:46.15	Canada	07:47.94	Germany 1	07:48.95
LW2x	Netherlands	06:49.27	South Africa	06:51.30	Great Britain 1	06:51.64
W1x	Switzerland	07:22.78	Ireland	07:25.30	Austria	07:25.51
W2-	Canada	06:58.88	Spain	07:04.23	Netherlands	07:04.40
W2x	Netherlands	06:47.69	Germany	06:49.97	Lithuania	06:50.95
W4-	Netherlands 2	06:27.36	Netherlands 1	06:28.65	Russia	06:30.13
W4x	Netherlands	06:14.31	Poland	06:16.15	Germany	06:17.42
W8+	Netherlands	06:07.22	Great Britain	06:11.13	China 1	06:14.79
PR1 W1x	Norway	11:17.32	Ukraine	13:32.43		

== Stage 2 ==
The second event of the 2018 World Rowing Cup took place in Ottensheim near Linz, Austria, 21–24 June 2018.

=== Medal summary ===
Event:	Gold:	Time	Silver:	Time	Bronze:	Time
Men's events
LM1x	Germany 1	06:52.41	Switzerland 1	06:55.31	Italy	06:55.68
LM2-	Brazil	06:48.12	Austria	06:53.25		
LM2x	Italy 1	06:22.71	Norway	06:24.45	Belgium	06:25.84
LM4x	Italy	05:52.58	Germany	05:58.36	Norway	06:01.00
M1x	New Zealand 1	06:44.96	Germany 2	06:46.20	Germany 1	06:47.27
M2-	Czech Republic	06:27.55	Croatia 1	06:28.43	France 1	06:29.44
M2x	Great Britain	06:11.24	Germany	06:13.71	Switzerland	06:14.49
M4-	Australia	05:50.70	Romania	05:53.76	Germany	05:56.60
M4x	Italy	05:40.28	Netherlands	05:42.04	Germany	05:42.52
M8+	Germany	05:26.88	Great Britain	05:28.18	Netherlands 1	05:29.37
PR1 M1x	Ukraine	09:38.65	Russia	09:50.93	Great Britain	09:58.12
PR2 M1x	Netherlands	08:38.53	Great Britain	08:57.54	Italy	10:03.37
PR2 Mix2x	Netherlands	08:13.26	Brazil	08:29.29	Poland	08:32.59
PR3 M2-	Great Britain	07:11.22	France 1	07:13.22	France 2	07:26.56
PR3 Mix2x	Austria	08:02.54				
PR3 Mix4+	Ukraine	07:25.31	Italy	07:26.25		
Women's events
LW1x	Poland	07:35.25	Belarus	07:37.37	Italy	07:38.32
LW2x	Italy	06:54.10	Netherlands	06:55.63	Romania	06:57.02
W1x	Switzerland	07:19.52	Austria	07:22.93	Denmark	07:23.08
W2-	New Zealand	07:08.53	Italy 1	07:15.30	Great Britain 2	07:22.24
W2x	New Zealand	06:52.30	Netherlands	06:54.75	Germany 2	06:58.20
W4-	Australia 1	06:30.83	Great Britain	06:32.47	China 1	06:33.20
W4x	Germany	06:25.91	China 1	06:28.77	Australia	06:28.92
W8+	Netherlands	06:03.78	New Zealand	06:05.56	Australia 1	06:09.55
PR1 W1x	Norway	10:46.22	Ukraine	11:31.46	Germany	11:33.47
PR2 W1x	France	09:40.53	Netherlands	09:50.58		

== Stage 3 ==
The third event of the 2018 World Rowing Cup took place in Lucerne, Switzerland, 13–15 July 2018.

=== Medal summary ===
Event:	Gold:	Time	Silver:	Time	Bronze:	Time
Men's events
LM1x	Switzerland 1	06:55.88	Australia 1	06:58.97	Germany 2	06:59.24
LM2x	Ireland	06:28.50	Belgium	06:29.30	Denmark	06:32.39
LM4x	Germany	05:55.30	Denmark	05:55.92	Netherlands	05:58.38
M1x	New Zealand 1	06:55.30	Germany 2	06:59.45	Czech Republic	07:00.72
M2-	New Zealand 1	06:32.93	France 1	06:33.58	Czech Republic	06:33.64
M2x	Poland	06:18.86	Germany	06:19.80	Switzerland	06:20.15
M4-	Australia 1	05:51.40	Netherlands	05:55.14	South Africa	05:58.52
M4x	Great Britain	05:44.25	Netherlands	05:44.99	Poland	05:45.33
M8+	Germany	05:31.81	Australia 1	05:31.95	Netherlands 1	05:33.72
Women's events
LW1x	Germany	07:39.21	Australia 1	07:42.77	Poland	07:43.07
LW2x	Poland	07:06.40	New Zealand	07:08.40	Switzerland	07:09.73
LW4x	China	06:28.04	Denmark	06:31.07	Germany	06:32.37
W1x	Switzerland	07:35.94	Ireland	07:36.17	Canada	07:37.03
W2-	New Zealand	07:07.20	Canada	07:07.63	United States 2	07:17.79
W2x	New Zealand	06:50.12	Canada	06:52.80	United States	06:53.04
W4-	Australia 1	06:27.03	Denmark	06:28.67	United States 2	06:32.08
W4x	Germany 1	06:27.28	Poland	06:29.28	Netherlands	06:31.04
W8+	New Zealand	06:06.17	Canada	06:08.11	United States	06:09.17

== World Cup standings ==
Rank	Nation	Belgrade points	Linz points	Lucerne points	Overall points
1	Germany	43	50	37	130
2	Netherlands	60	35	32	127
3	Great Britain	46	43	15	104
4	New Zealand		43	56	99
5	Australia		36	32	68
5	Poland	25	11	32	68
7	Switzerland	20	21	21	62
8	Canada	13		33	46
9	China	16	14	12	42
10	Italy		36		36
11	Czech Republic	15	9	11	35
12	Denmark	12	8	13	33
12	United States	3		30	33
14	France	7	12	13	32
15	Romania	13	16		29
16	Ireland	11		14	25
17	Austria	10	6	3	19
17	Belarus	14	5		19
19	Lithuania	13		5	18
20	Belgium	6	5	6	17
20	Norway	7	10		17
20	South Africa	8		9	17
20	Russia	11	3	3	17
24	Croatia	8	6		14
24	Spain	9		5	14
26	Ukraine		7		7
27	Serbia	4		2	6
28	Cuba	2	2		4
28	Greece		4		4
30	Hungary		2		2
31	Estonia	1			1
31	Chinese Taipei	1			1
