= Clive Disher =

Australian Army officer

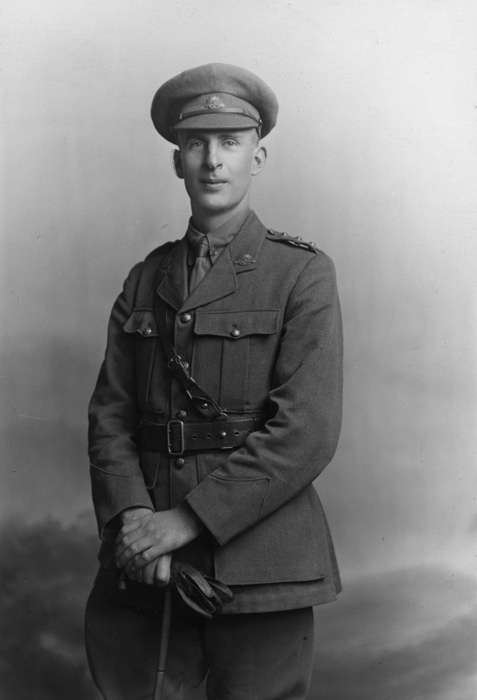
- As a captain in 1917
- Born: 15 October 1891; Rosedale, Victoria
- Died: 13 March 1976 (aged 84); Sale, Victoria
- Military career
- Allegiance: Australia
- Branch: Australian Army
- Service years: 1917–1945
- Rank: Brigadier
- Service number: VX294
- Conflicts: First World War; Western Front; Second World War; Battle of Bardia; Battle of Greece; Battle of Buna-Gona
- Awards: Commander of the Order of the British Empire; Officer of the Order of Saint John; Efficiency Decoration; Mentioned in Despatches

Harold Clive Disher, CBE, ED (15 October 1891 – 13 March 1976) was an Australian Army officer who served in the First and Second World Wars, a medical practitioner, a champion rower, and a pastoralist. He stroked the first AIF eight, which won the championship race at the 1919 Henley Royal Peace Regatta, and received the 1919 Helms Award for the most outstanding amateur athlete from Australasia. During the Second World War, he was in charge of medical services during the Battle of Bardia and the Battle of Buna-Gona.

== Early life ==
Harold Clive Disher was born in Rosedale, Victoria, on 15 October 1891. He was the third and youngest child of Henry Robert Disher, a grazier, and his wife Mary Louise née Hagenauer. He was educated at Rosedale State School, Gippsland College in Sale, Victoria, and Scotch College, Melbourne, where he rowed for the school team in the Head of the River regatta on the Yarra River in 1910 and Barwon River in 1911. He also served in the school's Australian Army Cadets unit. He rowed in the six seat of the Victorian state eight selected to contest the Australian interstate championships of 1914. He entered Ormond College at the University of Melbourne, where he studied medicine, and was awarded his dual Bachelor of Medicine, Bachelor of Surgery (MBBS) degrees in 1916.

== First World War ==
Disher enlisted in the First AIF on 13 July 1917, and was commissioned as a captain. He embarked for Europe aboard HMAT Themistocles on 4 August 1917, and arrived at Glasgow on 2 October 1917. On 28 October 1917 he was sent to the Western Front, where he was assigned to the 5th Field Ambulance. On 16 March 1918 he was attached to the 4th Field Artillery Brigade as its Regimental Medical Officer (RMO).

In March 1919, he was given leave to row in the AIF eight in the Henley Royal Peace Regatta. They won the King's Cup, defeating the Oxford University team in the final by a length. Disher received the 1919 Helms Award for the most outstanding amateur athlete from Australasia. He also took the opportunity for postgraduate study at hospitals in the UK under the Inter-Allied Fellowship of Medicine scheme from 23 July to 23 October 1919. He returned to Australia on the SS Nestor on 1 November 1919, where his AIF appointment was terminated on 22 January 1920.

== Between the wars ==
Disher received his Doctor of Medicine (MD) degree from the University of Melbourne in 1921. He married Doris Parks Kitson, a nurse, at St John's Anglican Church in East Malvern on 6 November 1926. He pursued a career as an anaesthetist, obtaining a Diploma in Anaesthetics issued jointly by the Royal College of Physicians, London, and the Royal College of Surgeons of England. He became an honorary anaesthetist at Royal Melbourne Hospital in 1928, and senior honorary anaesthetist in 1938. He became an Officer of the Order of Saint John on 22 December 1936, and was awarded the King George VI Coronation Medal in 1937.

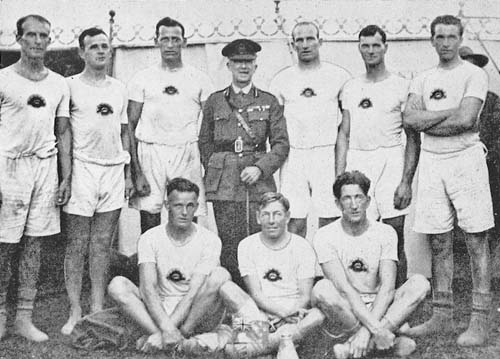
AIF#1 VIII 1919 Henley Peace Regatta : (rear) Disher, Mettam, Hauenstein, Lt. Gen Hobbs, Middleton, Scott, McGill, (front) Robb, Smedley, House.

The Army placed Disher on the Reserve of Officers with the rank of captain on 1 January 1921. He was promoted to major on 1 May 1924, and lieutenant colonel on 1 September 1930. He commanded the 5th Cavalry Field Ambulance (part of the 2nd Cavalry Division, a part-time Militia formation) from 11 April 1928 until 30 April 1936. He was placed on the unattached list on 1 July 1936, but was appointed Deputy Assistant Director of Medical Services (DADMS) of the 2nd Cavalry Division on 17 August 1936. On 1 October 1938, he became the Assistant Director of Medical Services (ADMS) of the 2nd Cavalry Division, with the temporary rank of colonel. His rank became substantive on 13 October 1939.

== Second World War ==
Disher joined the Second AIF as a colonel on 8 December 1939, and was allocated the AIF service number VX294. Five days later he embarked for the Middle East on the SS Strathallan as part of the AIF Advance Party. He was ADMS of the AIF Advance Base until 4 April 1940, when he became ADMS of the 6th Division. He was awarded the Efficiency Decoration on 20 June 1940. He was in charge of the medical arrangements for the Battle of Bardia, for which he was mentioned in despatches, and made a Commander of the Order of the British Empire on 4 July 1941. His citation read:

Colonel H. C. Disher was responsible for the complete organisation of the medical services during the engagements of Bardia 3–5 January, Tobruk 21–22 January, Derna 24–31 January, and the rest of the Cyrenaica campaign ending on 7 February. By his skilful distributions of dressing stations, thorough attention to detail, and inspiring influence, casualties were collected and received attention at the earliest possible moment. These efficient arrangements undoubtedly saved many valuable lives.

After serving in the Battle of Greece in April and May 1941, Disher embarked for Australia on 1 August 1941, where he became ADMS of the 1st Armoured Division. He was promoted to brigadier on 6 April 1942, and became Deputy Director of Medical Services (DDMS) of II Corps on 14 April 1942. On 30 November 1942 he took over as DDMS of New Guinea Force. As such, he was in charge of the medical arrangements during the Battle of Buna-Gona. He returned to Australia on 13 July 1943, and became Director of Medical Services (DMS) of the First Army. He relinquished that appointment on 6 September 1944, and went on leave without pay. His AIF appointment was terminated on 21 June 1945, and he was transferred to the Reserve of Officers as a brigadier.

== Later life ==
After the war, Disher retired from medicine and moved to an 800-hectare (2,000-acre) sheep and cattle grazing property on the shores of Lake Wellington in Gippsland that his grandfather had acquired in 1869, and of which he had become owner on the death of his father on 31 May 1944. Disher died at Sale on 13 March 1976, and his remains were cremated. He had no children, and his wife died on 8 June 1946.

Disher bequeathed his estate at Strathfieldsaye, which was valued at around $588,500 (equivalent to $4,145,000 in 2022), along with its records, to the University of Melbourne, which established the Strathfieldsaye Institute of Teaching and Research in Agriculture and Allied Sciences. The records were transferred to the University of Melbourne archives.

The Disher Challenge Cup, an annual rowing race for eight-oared boats on Canberra's Lake Burley Griffin that is contested by the Australian Defence Force Academy, the Royal Military College, Duntroon, and the Australian National University, was named in his honour; Disher presented the cup to the inaugural winners in 1971.
