= Thomas McGill =

Personal information
- Born: 1893
- Died: 23 August 1979 (aged 85–86)
- Years active: 1913–1922

Sport
- Sport: Rowing
- Club: Leichhardt Rowing Club

Achievements and titles
- National finals: 1920–1922 King's Cup

Thomas McGill
- Born: 1893
- Died: 23 August 1979 (aged 85–86)
- Military career
- Allegiance: Australia
- Branch: Australian Army
- Service years: 1915–19
- Rank: Lieutenant
- Unit: 20th Battalion (Australia)
- Conflicts: First World War; Western Front; Battle of Pozieres; Second Battle of Bullecourt

Thomas McGill MM (1893–1969) was an Australian infantry officer who saw active service in WWI. At war's end he rowed in the AIF #1 eight to victory at the 1919 Henley Peace Regatta and brought the King's Cup to Australia. Post WWI he was a New South Wales state representative rower.

== Club & state rowing ==
McGill was raised in Lewisham in Sydney. His club rowing was from the Leichhardt Rowing Club in that club's senior men's eight.

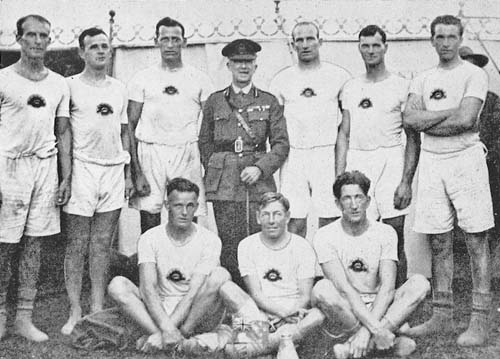
AIF #1 VIII 1919 Henley Peace Regatta : (rear) Disher, Mettam, Hauenstein, Lt. Gen Hobbs, Middleton, Scott, McGill, (front) Robb, Smedley, House.

After the war he returned to the Leichhardt Rowing Club and he was selected at three in the New South Wales men's eight in 1920 when Interstate eight-oared championships recommenced, now racing for the same King's Cup he had won at Henley. He again competed in New South Wales King's Cup eights in 1922 and 1923.

== War service ==
McGill enlisted in the AIF aged 22 in May 1915. He joined the 20th Battalion and embarked from Sydney on HMAT A61 Konowna in June 1915. In actions on the Western Front he was three times seriously wounded. He'd been promoted from Private to Sergeant by the time he was on the front line at Pozieres where he led digging parties under fire. By 1917 at 2nd Bullecourt he was a Second Lieutenant when he suffered bullet wounds in the arm and face suffering a complete loss of his teeth. At Ypres in October 1917 he received a gunshot wound to the thigh and was evacuated to London. He was back in the line again by January 1918 and three month's later was hit by shrapnel and spent months recovering at the AIF Base Hospital in Le Havre.

His citation for the Military Medal in September 1916 commended his "valuable work and good leadership greatly assisted success of the undertaking at Pozieres. Also consistent devotion to duty".

At war's end McGill rowed in the three seat of the AIF #1 eight at the 1919 Peace Regatta at Henley-on-Thames, the crew which won the King's Cup which in time, became the trophy for the men's eight event contested annually at the Australian Interstate Regatta. McGill was seated in the AIF#2 crew for most of the training period leading up to the July 1919 Peace Regatta. Along with George Mettam and Arthur Scott he was one of the final three crew changes made to the AIF #1 eight just ten days before the event. Later that month he again raced in the Australian AIF eight when they competed at the Inter-Allied Regatta on the Seine in Paris.

== Post war ==
After repatriation, McGill returned to Sydney where he worked in his family's haulage and trucking business. He had a long association with the Leichhardt Rowing Club and the Old Oarsmen's Association. He married Dorothy Rapp and they had two sons. He died in August 1979.
