= Albert E Smedley =

- Born: 1895
- Died: 25 November 1965 (aged 69–70); Concord Repatriation Hospital
- Military career
- Allegiance: Australia
- Branch: Australian Army
- Service years: 1915–19
- Rank: Sergeant
- Unit: 22nd Field Artillery
- Conflicts: First World War; Western Front; Battle of the Somme; Battle of Pozieres

Albert Smedley (1895 – 25 Nov 1965) was an Australian artilleryman who saw active service in World War I. He was a club level rowing coxswain who steered the First Australian Imperial Force #1 eight to victory at the 1919 Henley Peace Regatta and brought the King's Cup to Australia.

== Pre war ==
Smedley was raised in Sydney, New South Wales. Pre-war he was a signwriter and lived in East Sydney. His club coxing was from the Sydney Rowing Club.

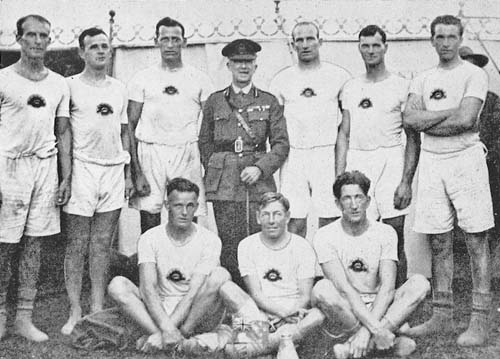
AIF #1 VIII 1919 Henley Peace Regatta : (rear) Disher, Mettam, Hauenstein, Lt. Gen Hobbs, Middleton, Scott, McGill, (front) Robb, Smedley, House.

== War service ==
Smedley enlisted in the AIF aged 20 in August 1915. He joined the 5th Field Artillery Brigade and embarked from Sydney on HMAT A45 Bulla in November 1915. On the Western Front he served with the 22nd Field Artillery. He was mentioned in despatches for "good and gallant conduct in connection with the recent hard fighting round Pozieres" and promoted on 27 July 1916 to sergeant. He was sent to artillery school as an instructor at the Australian General Base Depot in Le Havre.

At war's end Smedley coxed the AIF #1 eight at the 1919 Peace Regatta at Henley-on-Thames, the crew won the King's Cup which in time, became the trophy for the men's eight event contested annually at the Australian Interstate Regatta. Smedley was in the coxswain's seat of the AIF#2 crew for most of the training period leading up to the July 1919 Peace Regatta. Following his wily performance in the Marlow Victory Regatta in June 1919 he was one of the changes made to the AIF #1 eight just ten days before the event. Later that month he again raced in the Australian AIF eight when they competed at the Inter-Allied Regatta on the Seine in Paris.

== Post war ==
Smedley returned to Australia aboard the HMT Euripides arriving back in Oct 1919. He found a position with the State Electricity Board and also moonlighted as a taxi driver. In 1921 he married Myra Lewis and they had two children. Aged 70 he was admitted to the Concord Repatriation Hospital where he died on 25 November 1965.
