= Sydney Middleton =

Australia international rugby union player & Olympic rower

- Middleton in 1919
- Born: Sydney Albert Middleton; 24 February 1884 Glebe, New South Wales
- Died: 2 September 1945 (aged 61) Kensington, London

Rugby union career
- Position: number eight
Amateur team(s)
Years	Team	Apps	(Points)
- Glebe Rugby Union
Provincial / State sides
Years	Team	Apps	(Points)
1908–11	New South Wales	12	
International career
Years	Team	Apps	(Points)
1908–10	Australia	4	(0)
Medal record
Men's rugby union
Representing Australasia
Olympic Games
Gold medal – first place	1908 London	Team competition

Sydney Albert "Syd" Middleton DSO, OBE (24 February 1884 – 2 September 1945) was an Australian Army officer and national representative rugby union player and rower. He won a gold medal in rugby at the 1908 Summer Olympics and competed in rowing at the 1912 Summer Olympics.

He captained the Wallabies in a test series in 1910. As a rower, he was twice an Australian national champion and won the Grand Challenge Cup at the Henley Royal Regatta in 1912. He had a distinguished career in World War I, being awarded the DSO and later an OBE. He was a member of the AIF crew, which won at the 1919 Peace Regatta and brought the King's Cup to Australia.

== Rugby ==
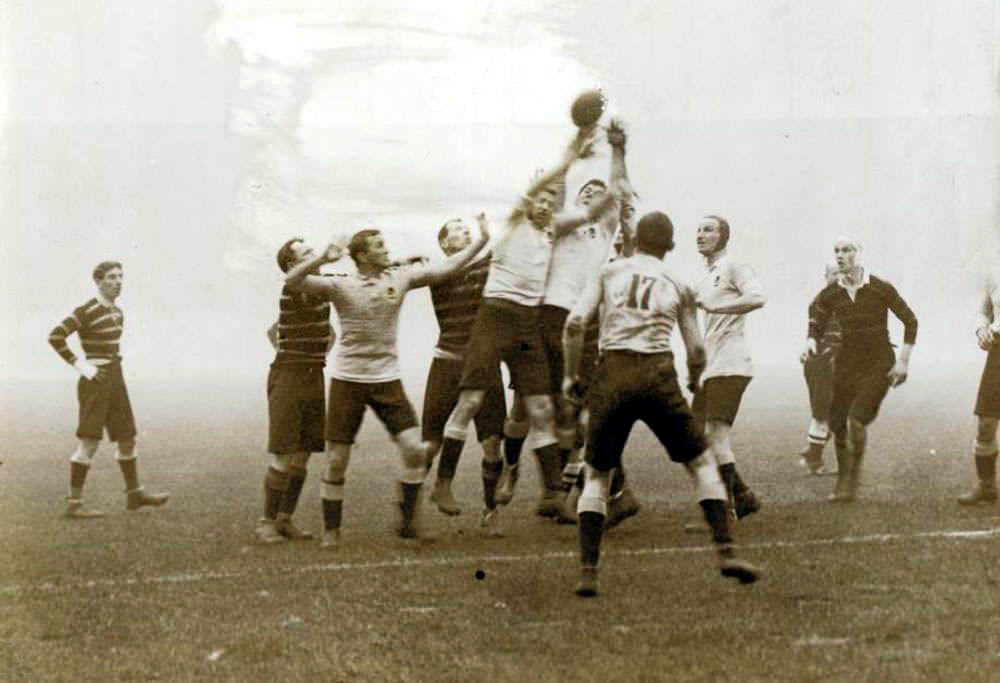
1908 Olympic Final Wallabies v Cornwall.

Middleton commenced his rugby career with the Glebe Rugby Club—the Sydney suburb of his birth. His first representative appearance was for New South Wales in the interstate series against Queensland in 1908 which performance saw him selected for New South Wales against the touring Anglo-Welsh side of 1908. He was in the right place at the right time. He was selected in Australia's inaugural national rugby team to tour the northern hemisphere – Dr Paddy Moran's First Wallabies. The tour was a long one—36 matches, and Middleton would prove to be a reliable member of the party, appearing in 31 of the Wallabies matches. He was the second tallest player in the squad which meant he featured in the Australian line-out. But he was also a robust defender at his physical peak, and he was selected for every one of the tour's first eighteen games.

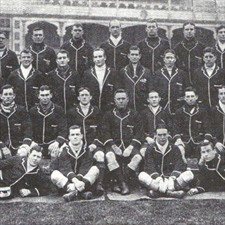
Detail from 1908 Wallaby squad photo, Middleton (3rd row, three from left) standing behind his captain Moran and coach McMahon.

=== 1908 Olympics ===
At the time, the rugby tournament for the London Olympics game may not have appeared to be of great significance. Australia had already beaten Cornwall, the British county champions, early in the tour, and Scotland, Ireland and France had all turned down the Rugby Football Union's invitation to participate in the Olympic bouts. Neither the tour captain, Moran, nor the vice-captain Fred Wood played, so Middleton's club captain Chris McKivat led the Wallabies to an easy 32–3 victory and to Olympic glory, with each Wallaby in that match thereafter an Olympic gold medallist.

Syd Middleton made his test debut on that tour at Rectory Field, Blackheath, in the test against England in January 1909. At the tour's end, McKivat would lead fourteen of the Wallabies into the professional ranks with the fledgling rugby league code in Sydney, but Middleton was not interested. He stayed loyal to the amateur game and was rewarded in 1910 when he captained New South Wales in matches against the All Blacks and the New Zealand Māori. That year, he captained the Australian national side in three tests against the All Blacks, one of which was won. All told, he made 33 national appearances for Australia, including four tests, three as captain.

== Rowing ==
Middleton retired from rugby in 1911 and concentrated on rowing. He had been a member of the Sydney Rowing Club for some time and regularly appeared in the New South Wales state selection eight between 1906 and 1911. He competed the New South Wales men's eights which contested the annual Australian Interstate Regatta in 1906, 1907 and 1910, 1911. Those New South Wales crews were victorious in 1910 and 1911.

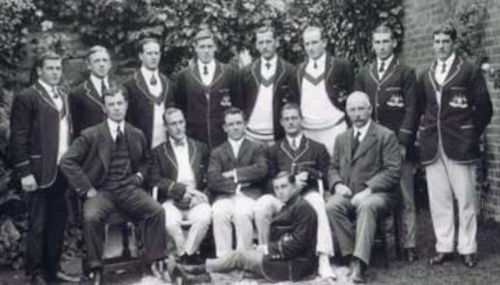
Middleton (backrow 3rd from right) with the 1912 Aust Olympic VIII, incl reserves & selectors.

In 1912, he was a member of the Australian men's eight, which, racing as a Sydney Rowing Club entrant, won the Grand Challenge Cup on the River Thames at the Henley Royal Regatta. The eight then moved to Stockholm for the 1912 Summer Olympics, where after beating a Swedish eight in the first round they were beaten by a Great British crew in the second round - the same Leander eight they'd beaten at Henley a few weeks earlier.

== War service ==
He enlisted in the AIF in 1915 as a 2nd-Lieutenant with B Company, 19th Battalion, and embarked from Sydney on board HMAT Ceramic on 25 June 1915. He served at Gallipoli and in France. He was promoted to Major, 17th Battalion in May 1917. He was mentioned in despatches in 1918, was awarded the Distinguished Service Order in 1919 for bravery in action, and in 1920, he was awarded the Order of the British Empire.

His recommendation for the DSO recorded: "The battalion owes much of its success to the splendid example set by this very fine type of officer. He was in command of the 17th Bttn. on 14 May 1918 east of Heilly, near Amiens when the enemy made a very determined attack on the front held by the 17th Bttn and the manner in which he handled the situation and quickly restored the line showed great initiative and leadership."

Middleton wrote from Gallipoli to the sporting journal The Referee:

There are dozens of footballers of lesser fame and lower grades knocking about. I meet them every day. A man is always taking a bit of a risk here, and there’s plenty of sickness about: but I’m still going strong, and hope to be for some little time yet. I haven’t killed a Turk yet, but they have gone pretty close to me far too often. The damage we do one another in the style of warfare is mainly from shells and bombs, and we never see the results in these cases, but there’s plenty evidence of former willing hand-to-hand goes lying about all round us, far too close to be pleasant if one’s at all delicate"..

— The Referee, 15 December 1915

== AIF Sports Control Board ==
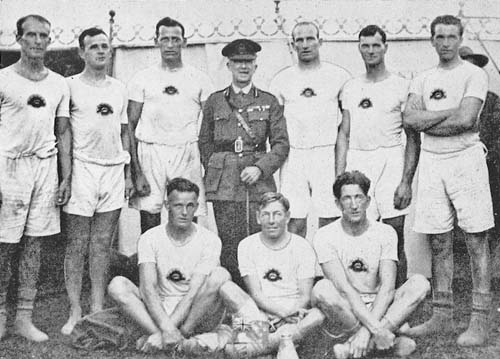
The AIF #1 VIII 1919 Henley Peace Regatta : (rear) Disher, Mettam, Hauenstein, Lt. Gen Hobbs, Middleton, Scott, McGill, (front) Robb, Smedley, House.

After the armistice, Middleton was integrally involved, as organising secretary of the AIF Sports Control Board, in arranging sporting events for the allied troops prior to their demobilisation.

=== Rowing ===
Middleton took a keen interest in the trials and selection of the overall rowing squad as they began to assemble in February 1919 to train for the 1919 Henley Royal Peace Regatta planned for July 1919. He took personal responsibility for finding their accommodations, boat fleet and coaching staff.

However, Middleton had a broader mandate for the Sports Control Board, and it wasn't until May 1919, when the rugby carnival had completed and the boxing and athletics events had concluded, that Middleton himself joined the AIF Rowing Section as a competitor. Middleton was in the six seat of the AIF #1 eight by the time of the Marlowe Victory Regatta on 21 June 1919 and then for the Henley Peace Regatta in July 1919 Middleton was again at six, balancing up the power from his old New South Wales King's Cup and Australian Olympic team-mate Henry Hauenstein in the five seat.

=== The King's Cup ===
The AIF#1 crew won the cup for eight-oared boats, which was presented by King George V; and, in time, from this, the "King's Cup" has become the trophy presented to the winning men's eight at the annual Australian Rowing Championships.

== Life post-war ==
Middleton had met Marion Streatfield, a nurse, when at the war's end, having commenced his work with the Sports Control Board, he was admitted to the 10th British Red Cross Hospital in Le Treport, France, suffering from catarrhal jaundice. They were married in September 1921 in London and lived in Iverna-Gardens, South Kensington. They had one son, John Peter, who served as a second lieutenant with the 12th Royal Lancers in WWII in Italy from 1944. Syd Middleton died suddenly on 2 September 1945.

== Honours and awards ==

- Distinguished Service Order
- Order of the British Empire
- 1914–15 Star
- British War Medal
- Victory Medal

== See also ==
- Rugby union at the 1908 Summer Olympics

== Footnotes ==
Preceded by Chris McKivat	Australian national rugby union captain 1910	Succeeded by Ward Prentice
