= Fred House (rower) =

Australian artillery officer and rower

Frederick House
Personal information
- Born: 1895
- Died: 1973 (aged 77–78)
- Years active: 1913-1920

Sport
- Sport: Rowing
- Club: Derwent Rowing Club

Achievements and titles
- National finals: 1913, 1914, 1920 King's Cup

Frederick Arthur House
- Born: 1895
- Died: 25 November 1965 (aged 69–70); Hobart Repatriation Hospital
- Military career
- Allegiance: Australia
- Branch: Australian Army
- Service years: 1915–19
- Rank: Lieutenant
- Unit: 3rd Field Artillery Brigade
- Conflicts: First World War: Gallipoli Campaign; Western Front; Battle of Pozieres

Frederick Arthur House (1890 - 21 Sept 1973) was an Australian artillery officer who saw active service in WWI. Pre and post WWI he was a Tasmanian state representative rower and a 1914 Australian national champion. At war's end he rowed in the AIF #1 eight to victory at the 1919 Henley Peace Regatta and brought the King's Cup to Australia.

== Club & state rowing ==
House was raised at Sandy Bay in Hobart, Tasmania. His club rowing was from the Derwent Rowing Club. In 1913 and in 1914 he was selected at stroke in the Tasmanian representative men's eights which competed for the Interstate eight-oared championship at the Australian Interstate Regatta. He led the 1914 Tasmanian eight to their championship victory.

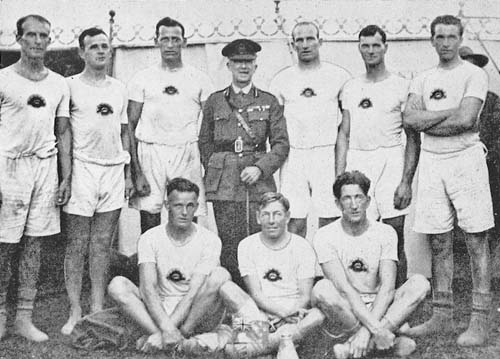
AIF #1 VIII 1919 Henley Peace Regatta : (rear) (rear) Disher, Mettam, Hauenstein, Lt. Gen Hobbs, Middleton, Scott, McGill, (front) Robb, Smedley, House.

After the war he returned to the Derwent Rowing Club and he was again selected to stroke the Tasmanian men's eight at the first post-war Interstate eight-oared championship of 1920. That crew placed third.

== War service ==
House enlisted in the AIF aged 25 in January 1915. He joined the 3rd Field Artillery Brigade and embarked from Melbourne on HMAT A54 Runic in February 1915. He saw action in Gallipoli and on the Western Front at Pozieres. In 1917 in Belgium he was gassed and admitted to hospital before returning to his unit. He was promoted from Gunner to Sergeant and then in late 1918 was commissioned a Lieutenant.

At war's end House rowed in the two seat of the AIF #1 eight at the 1919 Peace Regatta at Henley-on-Thames, the crew which won the King's Cup which in time, became the trophy for the men's eight event contested annually at the Australian Interstate Regatta. House had stroked the AIF#1 crew in the early days of their training period in 1919 before moving to two to make way for Clive Disher. Later in that month of July 1919 he again raced in the Australian AIF eight when they competed at the Inter-Allied Regatta on the Seine in Paris.

== Post war ==
Before repatriation, House stayed on in London till December 1919 to study motor engineering. House returned to Australia and married Ruby Miller in May 1920 and they had two sons. He ran a car hire business in Hobart. He donated the commemorative oar he had won at the Peace Regatta to the Australian War Memorial. He died at the Repatriation General Hospital in Hobart on 21 September 1973.
