= George Mettam =

Australian rower

Personal information
- Born: Wollongong; 1891
- Died: 5 April 1967 (aged 75–76)
- Years active: 1913-1922

Sport
- Sport: Rowing
- Club: West Australian Rowing Club

Achievements and titles
- National finals: 1913,14,20,21,22 King's Cup

George William Mettam
- Born: 1891
- Died: 5 April 1967 (aged 75–76)
- Military career
- Allegiance: Australia
- Branch: Australian Army
- Service years: 1915–19
- Rank: Gunner
- Unit: 4th Field Artillery Brigade
- Conflicts: First World War; Western Front; Second Battle of Passchendaele

George William Mettam (1891 – 5 April 1967) was an Australian artilleryman who saw active service in WWI. Pre and post WWI he was a Western Australian state representative rower. At war's end he rowed in the AIF #1 eight to victory at the 1919 Henley Peace Regatta and brought the King's Cup to Australia.

== Club and state rowing ==
Mettam was born in Wollongong, New South Wales but raised in Perth, Western Australia. His club rowing was from the West Australian Rowing Club. In 1913 and 1914 he was selected at six in the Western Australian representative men's eights which competed for the Interstate eight-oared championship at the Australian Interstate Regatta. He trained as an accountant with the Agricultural Bank (WA) before the war.

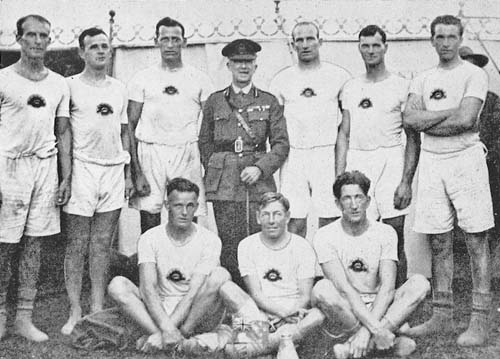
AIF #1 VIII 1919 Henley Peace Regatta : (rear) Disher, Mettam, Hauenstein, Lt. Gen Hobbs, Middleton, Scott, McGill, (front) Robb, Smedley, House.

After the war he returned to the West Australian Rowing Club and he was again selected at seven in the West Australian men's eight in 1920 when Interstate eight-oared championships recommenced, now racing for the same King's Cup he had won at Henley. He again competed in West Australian King's Cup eights in 1922 and 1923. George's brother Arthur, a winner of the Military Medal also rowed in the West Australian representative eights of 1913 and 1923.

== War service ==
Mettam enlisted in the AIF aged 25 in May 1916. He joined the 4th Field Artillery Brigade and embarked from Melbourne on HMAT A20 Hororata in November 1916. His first action on the Western Front in France in July 1917 saw him suffer a severe hand laceration which required surgery back in England. He returned to Belgium in November 1917 and saw artillery action with heavy-duty siege batteries in Steenwerck and Passchendaele.

At war's end Mettam rowed in the seven seat of the AIF #1 eight at the 1919 Peace Regatta at Henley-on-Thames, the crew which won the King's Cup which in time, became the trophy for the men's eight event contested annually at the Australian Interstate Regatta. Mettam was seated in the AIF#2 crew for most of the training period leading up to the July 1919 Peace Regatta. Along with Tom McGill and Arthur Scott he was one of the final three crew changes made to the AIF #1 eight just ten days before the event. Later that month he again raced in the Australian AIF eight when they competed at the Inter-Allied Regatta on the Seine in Paris.

== Post war ==
After repatriation, Mettam returned to Perth. He found a position with Cresco Fertilizer & Co and rose to the position of General Manager. He had a long association with both the West Australian Rowing Club and the Swan River Rowing Club continuing to compete at the masters level and then as a coach of both men's and women's crews. In his final year, Mettam was coach of the Wesley College 2nd eight rowing crew and was heralded by the crew as an inspirational and motivating coach. He married Jessie Burns in November 1924 and they had a son and a daughter. He died of a heart attack after swimming out to rescue the occupants of an upturned boat during a regatta on the Swan River.
