= Archie Robb =

Australian artilleryman and rower

Personal information
- Born: 1889
- Died: 1962 (aged 72–73)
- Years active: 1913-1921

Sport
- Sport: Rowing
- Club: Derwent Rowing Club

Achievements and titles
- National finals: 1913-14,1920-21 King's Cup

Archibald Ronald Robb
- Born: 1889
- Died: 1962 (aged 72–73)
- Military career
- Allegiance: Australia
- Branch: Australian Army
- Service years: 1915–19
- Rank: Sergeant
- Units: 4th Field Artillery Brigade; 2nd Divisional Artillery Column
- Conflicts: First World War; Western Front

Archibald Ronald Robb (1889 - 1962) was an Australian artilleryman who saw active service in World War I. Before and after the First World War he was a Tasmanian state representative rower and a 1914 Australian national champion. At war's end he rowed in the AIF #1 eight to victory at the 1919 Henley Peace Regatta and brought the King's Cup to Australia.

== Club and state rowing ==
Robb was raised in Hobart, Tasmania. His club rowing was from the Derwent Rowing Club. In 1913 and in 1914 he was selected at seven in the Tasmanian representative men's eights which competed for the Interstate eight-oared championship at the Australian Interstate Regatta. He rowed in the 1914 Tasmanian eight to their championship victory.

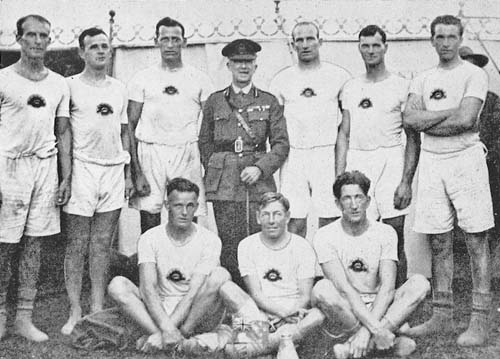
AIF #1 VIII 1919 Henley Peace Regatta : (rear) Disher, Mettam, Hauenstein, Lt. Gen Hobbs, Middleton, Scott, McGill, (front) Robb, Smedley, House.

After the war he returned to the Derwent Rowing Club and he was again selected at seven in Tasmanian men's eights in 1920 and 1921 when Interstate eight-oared championships recommenced, now racing for the same King's Cup Robb had won at Henley in 1919.

== War service ==
Robb enlisted in the AIF aged 26 in August 1915. He joined the 4th Field Artillery Brigade and embarked from Melbourne on HMAT A54 Wiltshire in November 1915. He saw action in Gallipoli and on the Western Front at Pozieres. He arrived in Alexandria as Gallipoli was being evacuated and was shipped with those troops on to Marseilles. He saw action on the Western Front with the 2nd Division Artillery Column working with horse teams pulling artillery and ammunition limbers to the firing lines. He was transferred back to the 4th Field Artillery Brigade. He was promoted from Fitter to Sergeant and finished the war suffering severe concussion deafness.

At war's end Robb rowed in the bow seat of the AIF #1 eight at the 1919 Peace Regatta at Henley-on-Thames, the crew which won the King's Cup which in time, became the trophy for the men's eight event contested annually at the Australian Interstate Regatta. Robb was one of first arrivals to the AIF rowing section when they commenced their training in early 1919 and he secured and held the bow seat in the AIF#1 crew. Later in the month of July 1919 he again raced in the Australian AIF eight when they competed at the Inter-Allied Regatta on the Seine in Paris.

== Post war ==
After repatriation, Robb returned to Tasmania and was discharged as medically unfit with concussion deafness. He found work as a fitter and turner at the Cascade Brewery in Hobart where he worked for thirty years. He married Zoe Schott in March 1927 and they had two children. He was in England attending his daughter's birthday when he died suddenly in 1962.
