= Anthony Carwardine =

Anthony Michael Carwardine
- Born: 25 March 1938 (age 88); Sydney, New South Wales
- Military career
- Allegiance: Australia
- Branch: Royal Australian Navy
- Service years: 1954–1995
- Rank: Rear Admiral
- Commands: Australian Defence Force Academy (1993–95); HMAS Cerberus (1986–88); HMAS Adelaide (1983–85); HMAS Swan (1976–78)
- Awards: Officer of the Order of Australia

Rear Admiral Anthony Michael "Gerry" Carwardine AO (born 25 March 1938) is a retired Australian naval officer, Chief of Naval Personnel in the Royal Australian Navy and former Commandant of the Australian Defence Force Academy.

== Early life ==
Carwardine was educated at Newington College (1947–1953), commencing as a preparatory school student in Wyvern House, before entering the Royal Australian Naval College.

== Naval career ==
- Entered – Royal Australian Navy (1954)
- Served – HMA Ships Queenborough, Quiberon, Vendetta, Brisbane, Melbourne, Banks, Gull, and HM Ships Carron and Corunna (1956–1974)
- Commanding Officer – HMAS Swan (1976–1978)
- Director – Naval Data Combat System Centre (1980–1983)
- Commander – HMAS Adelaide (1983–1985)
- Commanding Officer – HMAS Cerberus (1986–1988)
- Naval Officer Commanding – Victoria (1986–1988)
- Chief – Naval Personnel (1988–1990)
- Defence Attaché – Washington, D.C. (1991–1992)
- Commandant – Australian Defence Force Academy (1993–1995)

== Retirement ==
Since 1998 Carwardine has been a service member of the Veterans' Review Board, representing the Australian Capital Territory.

== Honours ==
- National Medal (1977) – Awarded for diligent long service to the community in hazardous circumstances in times of emergency and national disaster and in direct protection of life and property
- National Medal, 1st Clasp (1981) – Awarded for diligent long service to the community in hazardous circumstances in times of emergency and national disaster and in direct protection of life and property
- Member, Order of Australia (1986) – In recognition of service to the Royal Australian Navy, particularly as Commanding Officer of HMAS Adelaide
- Officer, Order of Australia (1990) – In recognition of service to the Royal Australian Navy, particularly as the Assistant Chief of Naval Personnel

Military offices
Preceded by Air Vice Marshal Richard Bomball	Commandant of the Australian Defence Force Academy; 1993–1995	Succeeded by Major General Frank Hickling
