= Richard Bomball =

Australian air force officer

- Born: 13 October 1937 (age 89); Richmond, Victoria
- Military career
- Allegiance: Australia
- Branch: Royal Australian Air Force
- Service years: 1956–1993
- Rank: Air Vice Marshal
- Commands: Australian Defence Force Academy (1990–93); RAAF Base Williamtown (1984–86); No. 3 Squadron (1973–74)
- Conflicts: Malayan Emergency
- Awards: Officer of the Order of Australia; Air Force Cross; Queen's Commendation for Valuable Service in the Air
- Other work: Chairman of Newcastle Airport Limited

Air Vice Marshal Richard John Bomball, AO, AFC (born 13 October 1937) is a retired Royal Australian Air Force officer, Assistant Chief of the Air Staff – Development and former Commandant of the Australian Defence Force Academy.

== Early life ==
Born on 13 October 1937, in Richmond, Victoria, Bomball was educated at Mentone Grammar School and joined the Royal Australian Air Force on graduation.

== Career and later life ==
Bomball entered the Royal Australian Air Force in 1956. He served in a variety of units and roles, including as the commanding officer of No. 3 Squadron and the Director of Staff at the RAAF Staff College. He was promoted to Air Vice Marshal and appointed as Assistant Chief of the Air Staff in 1988.

Following his retirement from the Air Force, Bomball was appointed as the first Chairman of the Board of Newcastle Airport Limited in 1993, when control of the airport was transferred from the Commonwealth to joint control by Newcastle City Council and Port Stephens Council. He served until 2004. In 1994 he was appointed to serve on the Veterans' Compensation Review Committee by the Minister for Veterans' Affairs, John Faulkner, subsequently co-authoring a report on compensation for veterans and war widows. In 2024 he published Selling the Mirage, an account of the 1990 sale of the RAAF's retired Mirage fleet to the Pakistani Air Force.

== Honours ==
Officer of the Order of Australia (AO)	AD 1990
Air Force Cross (AFC)	QB 1969
General Service Medal	
Queen's Commendation for Valuable Service in the Air	NY 1967 – Attached to GSM
Australian Service Medal 1945-1975	
Defence Force Service Medal with 4 clasps	for 35–39 years of service
National Medal with First Clasp	QB 1977/AD 1982 – for 25 years of service
Australian Defence Medal	
Pingat Jasa Malaysia (Malaysia)	

Military offices
Preceded by Wing Commander Peter Scully	Commanding Officer, No. 3 Squadron RAAF; 1973–1974	Succeeded by Wing Commander D. W. Owens
Preceded by Major General Peter Day	Commandant of the Australian Defence Force Academy; 1990–1993	Succeeded by Rear Admiral Anthony Carwardine
Government offices
New title	Chairman of Newcastle Airport Limited; 1993–2004	Succeeded by Air Vice Marshal John Kindler
