= King's Cup (rowing) =

Annual rowing race in Australia

- Australian King's Cup
Location	Penrith Lakes, Australia
Organiser	Rowing Australia
Years Active	1878 - current
Course	Venue of the Australian Rowing Championships
Course length	2,000m
Events	Final event of the Annual Interstate Regatta
Trophy	King's Cup since 1921
- Course image
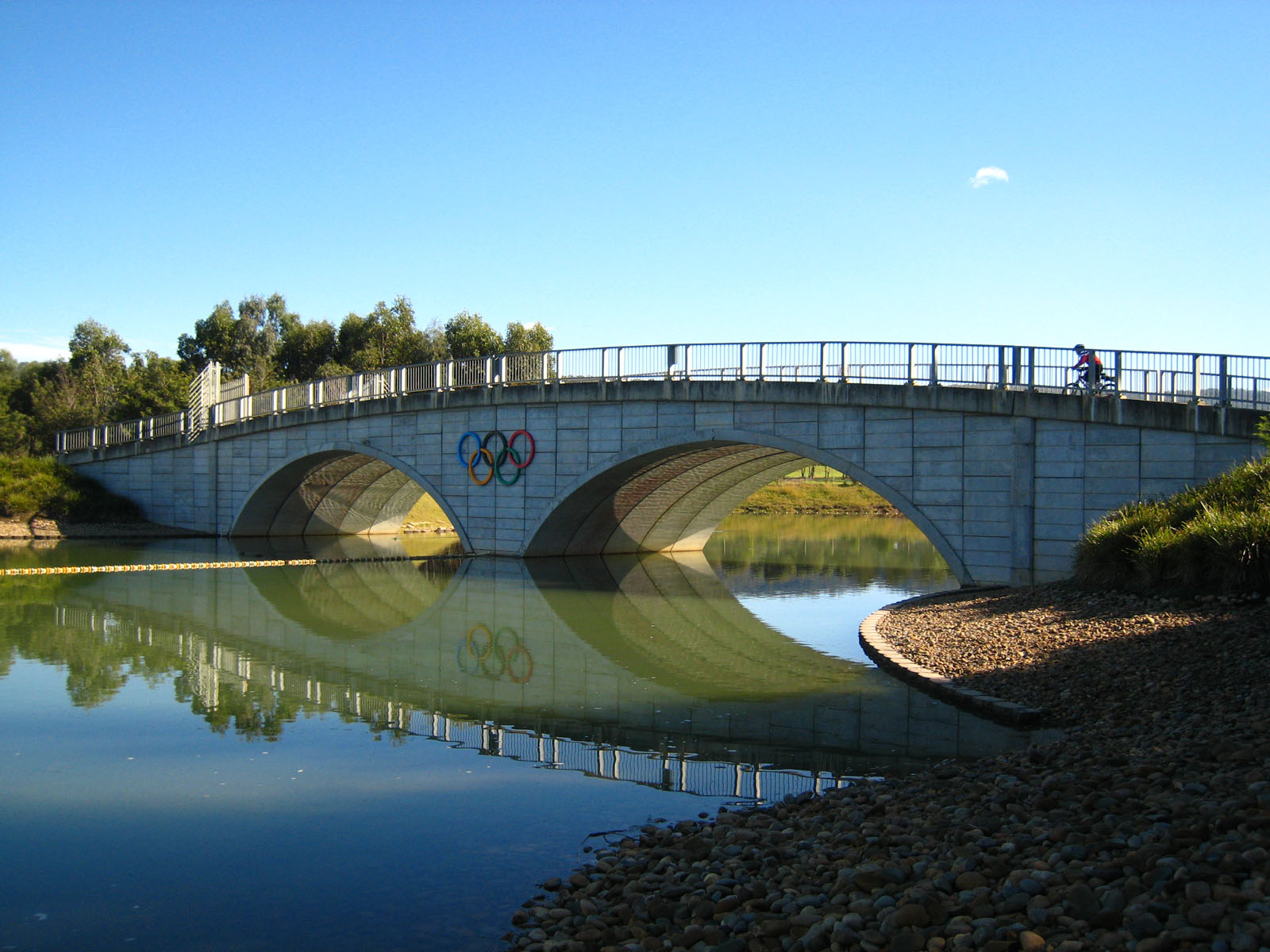
- The bridge at the SIRC

The King's Cup is Australia's blue riband annual rowing race for men. Since 1878 it has been contested by state representative senior heavyweight men's eights at the annual Australian Interstate Regatta. Since 1973 the Australian Interstate Regatta has been conducted on the final day of the week-long annual Australian Rowing Championships. The King's Cup is the final event of the Australian Championships and the Interstate Regatta.

== Early history ==
Victoria and New South Wales commenced inter-colonial racing in eight-oared boats in 1878 when the Victorian Rowing Association invited New South Wales oarsmen from the Sydney and the Mercantile clubs to boat crews for a race on the lower Yarra River over about four miles. Queensland, South Australia and Tasmania all showed an interest in entering crews from the mid-1880s but disagreements over definitions of amateur status resulted in inconsistencies in eligibility criteria in the early decades. New South Wales held firm to a view that not just professional sportsmen and those employed around boats would be deemed non-amateurs but also all manual labourers. The other states had relaxed this view by 1899. Queensland and Tasmania first entered crews in 1885 and then Queensland raced regularly from 1890. From 1899 South Australia were racing annually. Following Federation the race became the interstate eight-oared championship with Tasmania and West Australia boating crews regularly by 1906.

== The Trophy ==

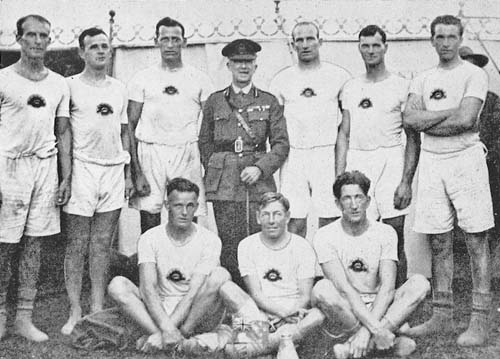
AIF #1 VIII 1919 Henley Peace Regatta : (rear) Disher, Mettam, Hauenstein, Lt. Gen Hobbs, Middleton, Scott, McGill, (front) Robb, Smedley, House.

Since 1921 the crews have competed for the King's Cup. The trophy had been won by a First Australian Imperial Force crew at the Royal Peace Regatta held in London in 1919 following the cessation of hostilities at the end of World War I and was presented to the victorious eight-oared boat by King George V. In time, and in spite of dogged resistance from the Australian War Memorial, the Victorian Rowing Association petitioned the King to express his intention for the Cup, and at his command it became the perennial trophy to be presented to the winning state representative men's eight at the annual Australian Rowing Championships.

The AIF #1 crew, all former club oarsmen who secured the King's Cup for Australia were seated as follows: Bow - Sgt. Archie A Robb (Derwent Rowing Club, Tasmania); 2 - Lieut. Fred A House (Derwent Rowing Club, Tasmania); 3 - Lieut. Thomas McGill (Leichhardt Rowing Club, NSW); 4 - Gnnr. Arthur Scott (Murray Bridge Rowing Club, SA); 5 - Lieut. Henry Hauenstein (Leichhardt Rowing Club, NSW); 6 - Maj. Sydney Middleton (Sydney Rowing Club, NSW); 7 - Gnnr. George William Mettam (West Aust Rowing Club), WA; Str - Capt. Harold Clive Disher (Melb Uni Boat Club, Vic ); Cox - Sgt. Albert Smedley (Sydney Rowing Club, NSW).

== High-achievers ==
- James Tomkins rowed in Victorian King's Cup VIIIs on eighteen occasions between 1985 & 2008 for fifteen victories and three 2nd places.
- Mike McKay rowed sixteen times for Victoria in the King's Cup for thirteen wins and two seconds.
- Karsten Forsterling contested the King's Cup in Victorian VIIIs on twelve occasions in the fifteen-year period from 2001 to 2015. He was in the winning crew on six occasions and placed 2nd six times.
- James Chapman contested the King's Cup in NSW VIIIs on twelve occasions in the thirteen years from 2003 to 2015. He was victorious on seven occasions. He rowed in crews with Samuel Loch, Matt Ryan and Fergus Pragnell to six consecutive victories between 2008 and 2013.
- Spencer Turrin of Sydney Rowing Club raced for NSW in ten consecutive King's Cups between 2013 and 2023 for seven victories.
- Josh Hicks raced for WA in nine consecutive King's Cups between 2014 and 2023, five times as stroke.
- David Anderson of the Leichhardt Club rowed in eight consecutive New South Wales King's Cup VIIIs from 1950 to 1957 for two victories.
- Phil Cayzer stroked the New South Wales King's Cup VIII on five occasions from 1948 to 1954, winning the championship in 1949, 1950 and 1951.
- Alan Grover coxed the New South Wales King's Cup VIII five times consecutively from 1962 to 1969 and then in 1980 for a sixth time.
- Michael Morgan rowed in New South Wales King's Cup VIIIs for six consecutive years from 1968 to 1973, winning the title in 1968 and 1972.

== Winners ==
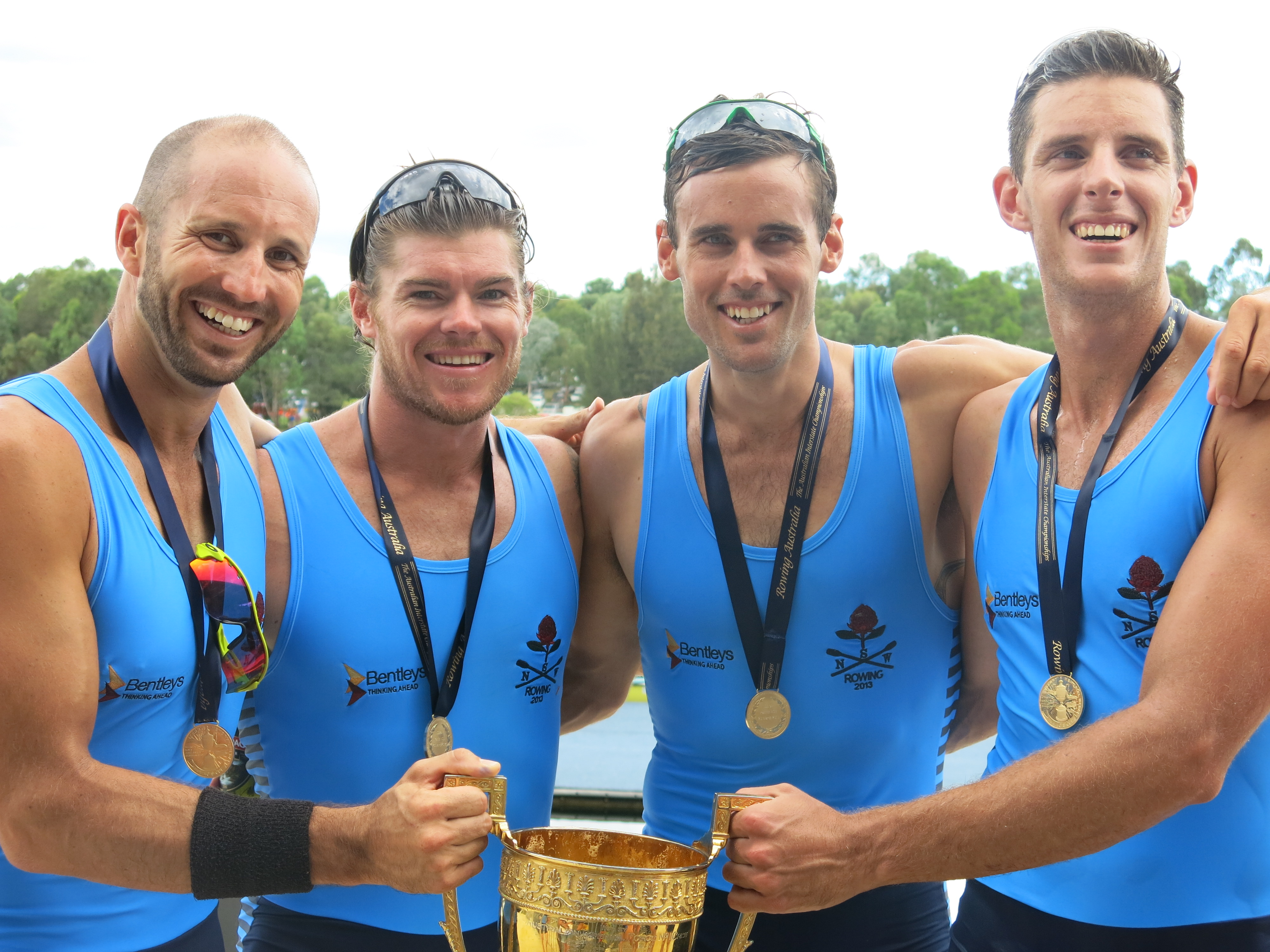
Chapman, Loch, Ryan & Pragnell on their sixth successive win in 2013.

Results
Year	Winner	2nd	3rd
1878	Victoria	New South Wales	
1879	New South Wales	Victoria	
1880	Victoria	New South Wales	
1881	Victoria	New South Wales	
1882	New South Wales	Victoria	
1883	Victoria	New South Wales	
1884	Victoria	New South Wales	
1885	New South Wales	Victoria	Tasmania
1886	Victoria	New South Wales	
1887	Victoria	New South Wales	
1888 i	Victoria	New South Wales	
1888 ii	Victoria	New South Wales	
1889	Victoria	New South Wales	
1890	Victoria	Queensland	New South Wales
1891	Queensland	New South Wales	Victoria
1892	Victoria	New South Wales	Queensland
1893	New South Wales	Victoria	Queensland
1894	Victoria	New South Wales	Queensland
1895	Victoria	New South Wales	Queensland
1896	Victoria	New South Wales	Queensland
1897	Victoria	Western Australia	Queensland
1898	Victoria	Queensland	
1899	Victoria	New South Wales	South Australia
1900	Victoria	New South Wales	Queensland
1901	Victoria	New South Wales	South Australia
1902	Victoria	South Australia	Queensland
1903	Victoria	Queensland	South Australia
1904	Victoria	South Australia	Queensland
1905	Victoria	Tasmania	New South Wales
1906	Tasmania	Victoria	New South Wales
1907	Victoria	Tasmania	Queensland
1908	New South Wales	Victoria	Tasmania
1909	Tasmania	Victoria	New South Wales
1910	New South Wales	Victoria	Tasmania
1911	New South Wales	Victoria	Tasmania
1912	Victoria	Tasmania	South Australia
1913	South Australia	Tasmania	Western Australia
1914	Tasmania	South Australia	Western Australia
1920	South Australia	Western Australia	Tasmania
1921	Western Australia	Tasmania	Victoria
1922	South Australia	Victoria	Western Australia
1923	South Australia	Western Australia	Victoria
1924	Queensland	New South Wales	South Australia
1925	Western Australia	Tasmania	New South Wales
1926	Tasmania	South Australia	Victoria
1927	Western Australia	New South Wales	Victoria
1928	Western Australia	Queensland	Tasmania
1929	New South Wales	Western Australia	Victoria
1930	Victoria	New South Wales	Queensland
1932	Victoria	New South Wales	Western Australia
1933	New South Wales	Queensland	Victoria
1934	New South Wales	Western Australia	Queensland
1935	New South Wales	Western Australia	South Australia
1936	New South Wales	South Australia	Western Australia
1937	South Australia	New South Wales	Western Australia
1938	Western Australia	New South Wales	Tasmania
1939	Queensland	New South Wales	South Australia
1946	Victoria	New South Wales	Western Australia
1947	Victoria	New South Wales	Western Australia
1948	New South Wales	Western Australia	South Australia
1949	New South Wales	Western Australia	Victoria
1950	New South Wales	Victoria	Western Australia
1951	New South Wales	Victoria	Western Australia
1952	Victoria	New South Wales	Tasmania
1953	Victoria	New South Wales	Western Australia
1954	Victoria	New South Wales	Queensland
1955	Western Australia	Victoria	New South Wales
1956	Victoria	New South Wales	Queensland
1957	Victoria	New South Wales	Queensland
1958	Victoria	Western Australia	New South Wales
1959	New South Wales	Victoria	Western Australia
1960	Western Australia	New South Wales	Victoria
1961	Victoria	New South Wales	Western Australia
1962	Victoria	Western Australia	Tasmania
1963	Victoria	New South Wales	Western Australia
1964	Victoria	New South Wales	Western Australia
1965	New South Wales	Victoria	Western Australia
1966	Victoria	New South Wales	South Australia
1967	New South Wales	Tasmania	South Australia
1968	New South Wales	Victoria	Tasmania
1969	Victoria	New South Wales	South Australia
1970	Victoria	South Australia	Tasmania
1971	Victoria	South Australia	New South Wales
1972	New South Wales	Western Australia	Victoria
1973	Western Australia	Victoria	South Australia
1974	New South Wales	South Australia	Western Australia
1975	New South Wales	South Australia	Victoria
1976	New South Wales	Victoria	South Australia
1977	New South Wales	South Australia	Victoria
1978	New South Wales	Victoria	Tasmania
1979	Victoria	South Australia	New South Wales
1980	Victoria	New South Wales	South Australia
1981	South Australia	Victoria	Queensland
1982	South Australia	Tasmania	Victoria
1983	South Australia	Victoria	New South Wales
1984	New South Wales	South Australia	Victoria
1985	Victoria	South Australia	New South Wales
1986	Victoria	New South Wales	South Australia
1987	Victoria	New South Wales	Queensland
1988	Victoria	South Australia	New South Wales
1989	Victoria	Western Australia	
1990	Victoria	Western Australia	Queensland
1991	Victoria	New South Wales	Western Australia
1992	Victoria	Western Australia	South Australia
1993	Victoria	Western Australia	Queensland
1994	Victoria	New South Wales	Queensland
1995	Victoria	New South Wales	Western Australia
1996	Victoria	New South Wales	Queensland
1997	Aust Capital Territory	New South Wales	Victoria
1998	Victoria	New South Wales	Western Australia
1999	Western Australia	Victoria	Queensland
2000	Victoria	Austn Capital Territory	New South Wales
2001	Victoria	New South Wales	Western Australia
2002	Victoria	Western Australia	New South Wales
2003	Victoria	Western Australia	New South Wales
2004	New South Wales	Victoria	Queensland
2005	Western Australia	Victoria	Queensland
2006	Victoria	Western Australia	New South Wales
2007	Victoria	New South Wales	Western Australia
2008	New South Wales	Victoria	Western Australia
2009	New South Wales	Victoria	Western Australia
2010	New South Wales	Victoria	South Australia
2011	New South Wales	Victoria	South Australia
2012	New South Wales	Victoria	South Australia
2013	New South Wales	Victoria	South Australia
2014	New South Wales	South Australia	Victoria
2015	Victoria	New South Wales	South Australia
2016	Victoria	New South Wales	South Australia
2017	New South Wales	Victoria	South Australia
2018	New South Wales	Victoria	Western Australia
2019	New South Wales	Victoria	South Australia
2020	-	Did not race	-
2021	Victoria	New South Wales	Queensland
2022	New South Wales	Victoria	Western Australia
2023	New South Wales	Victoria	Queensland
2024	Victoria	New South Wales	South Australia
2025	Victoria	New South Wales	Queensland
2026	Queensland	Victoria	South Australia
