= Disher Challenge Cup =

Australian rowing boat race award

The Disher Challenge Cup is awarded to the winner of an annual eight oar rowing boat race held over a distance of approximately 3 miles at a regatta between three tertiary institutions in the Australian Capital Territory:

- the Royal Military College, Duntroon,
- the Australian National University, and
- the Australian Defence Force Academy.

Other crews race by invitation, but cannot be awarded the Cup.

== History ==
The Disher Challenge Cup was named for Captain H.C. (Clive) Disher of the Australian Army Medical Corps, who stroked the 1919 Australian Imperial Force (AIF) Number 1 crew that beat Oxford University in the final of the Inter-Allied Services event at the Henley Peace Regatta after the end of the World War I.

Disher presented the Disher Cup to the inaugural winning crew, the Australian National University, in 1971.

Initially the Cup was between the Royal Military College and the Australian National University until the Australian Defence Force Academy was established in 1986.

The inscription reads:

The Disher Challenge Cup Presented by Dr Clive Disher CBE ED
for annual competition between eight oared crews representing the Australian National University and
the Royal Military College Duntroon in memory of the AIF eight oared crew, winners of the King's Cup,

Royal Henley Peace Regatta 1919.

== Disher Cup Regatta ==
The regatta for the Disher Cup is held on Lake Burley Griffin, an artificial lake in the centre of Canberra, Australia's national capital city. The lake is about 10 km long. The original course was 4.8 km, from Sullivan's Creek at the ANU to the mouth of the Molonglo River near Duntroon.

The course was changed to be fairer and safer, at 4250 metres, that begins at Aspen Island, passes under Commonwealth Bridge and finishes at Yarralumla. Both the men's (for the Disher Challenge Cup) and women's eights race are over the 4250 metre course.

Races for men's and women's coxed fours over 2000 metres are also held as a part of the Disher Cup Regatta.

In recent years the courses have been shortened over all contested shields and trophies. A trend that has continued to accommodate spectator viewing and accessibility of the race.

Other trophies contested for at the Disher Cup Regatta are:

- L.W. Nicholl Shield for men's 4s (first presented in 1989)
- Colonel Diane Harris Trophy for women's 4s (first presented in 1999)
- Anne Curtis Cup for women's 8s: RMC v ADFA v ANU (first presented in 1993)

== Results ==
Disher Challenge Cup for Men's 8 with cox
| Year | Won by (Time) | Second (+margin) | Third (+margin) | Other crews/Notes |
|---|---|---|---|---|
| 1971 | ANU | RMC | – | |
| 1972 | RMC | ANU | – | |
| 1973 | RMC | ANU | – | |
| 1974 | RMC | ANU | – | |
| 1978 | ANU | RMC | – | |
| 1979 | ANU | RMC | – | |
| 1980 | ANU | RMC | – | |
| 1981 | ANU | RMC | – | |
| 1982 | ANU | RMC | – | |
| 1983 | ANU | RMC | – | |
| 1984 | ANU | RMC | – | |
| 1985 | ANU | RMC | – | |
| 1986 | ANU | RMC | – | |
| 1987 | ANU | RMC | – | |
| 1988 | RMC | ADFA | ANU | |
| 1989 | ADFA | ANU | RMC | |
| 1990 | ADFA | ANU | RMC | |
| 1991 | ADFA | ANU | RMC | |
| 1992 | RMC | ADFA | ANU | |
| 1993 | ADFA | ANU | RMC | |
| 1994 | ANU | ADFA | RMC | |
| 1995 | ADFA | ANU | RMC | |
| 1996 | RMC | ? | ? | |
| 1997 | ANU | ADFA | RMC | |
| 1998 | ADFA | ANU | RMC | |
| 1999 | ADFA | ANU | RMC | |
| 2000 | ANU | ADFA | RMC | |
| 2001 | ANU | ADFA | RMC | |
| 2002 | ANU | RMC | ADFA | |
| 2003 | ANU | UC | ADFA | RMC raced but didn't place |
| 2004 | UC | ADFA | RMC | ANU (missed start) |
| 2005 | UC | ANU | ADFA | RMC raced but didn't place |
| 2006 | ADFA | ANU | RMC | Race affected by strong winds (14 October), limited to 2000m |
| 2007 | ANU | ADFA | RMC | |
| 2008 | ANU | ADFA | RMC | |
| 2009 | ANU (14:22) | ADFA (+32.53) | RMC (+147.07) | |
| 2010 | ANU | ADFA | RMC | |
| 2011 | ANU | ADFA | – | |
| 2012 | ADFA | ANU | RMC | |
| 2013 | ANU | ADFA | RMC | |
| 2014 | ANU | ADFA (+18.52) | RMC (+62.22) | Raced from Kingston Foreshore to Regatta Point |
| 2026 | ANU | ADFA (+17.77) | - | Raced from Museum Point to end of Yarralumla Bay (2500 m) |

Anne Curtis Trophy for Women's 8 with cox
| Year | Won by (Time) | Second (+margin) | Third (+margin) | Other crews/Notes |
|---|---|---|---|---|
| 2013 | ANU | ? | ? | |
| 2014 | ADFA | ANU (+7.44) | RMC (+29.63) | |
| 2026 | ADFA | ANU (+1.52) | - | Raced from Museum Point to end of Yarralumla Bay (2500 m) |

L W Nicholl Shield for men's 4 with cox
| Year | Won by (Time) | Second (+margin) | Third (+margin) | Other crews/Notes |
|---|---|---|---|---|
| 2013 | ADFA | ? | ? | |
| 2026 | ANU | ADFA (+13.71) | - | 1000 m |

Colonel Diane Harris Trophy for women's 4 with cox
| Year | Won by (Time) | Second (+margin) | Third (+margin) | Other crews/Notes |
|---|---|---|---|---|
| 2013 | ANU | ? | ? | |
| 2026 | ADFA | ANU (+13.71) | - | ADFA boat uncoxed, 1000 m |

Men's Singles
| Year | Won by (Time) | Second (+margin) | Third (+margin) | Other crews/Notes |
|---|---|---|---|---|
| 2013 | ANU | ? | ? | |
| 2026 | ANU | ADFA (+8.68) | - | 500 m |

Women's Singles
| Year | Won by (Time) | Second (+margin) | Third (+margin) | Other crews/Notes |
|---|---|---|---|---|
| 2013 | ANU | ? | ? | |
| 2026 | ANU | ADFA (+1.35) | ? | 500 m |

== See also ==
- Henley Royal Regatta
- Rowing Australia
- Head of the River (Australia)
- Head of the River
- Head of the River Race
