= Mount Pleasant (Australian Capital Territory) =

Mountain in Canberra, Australia

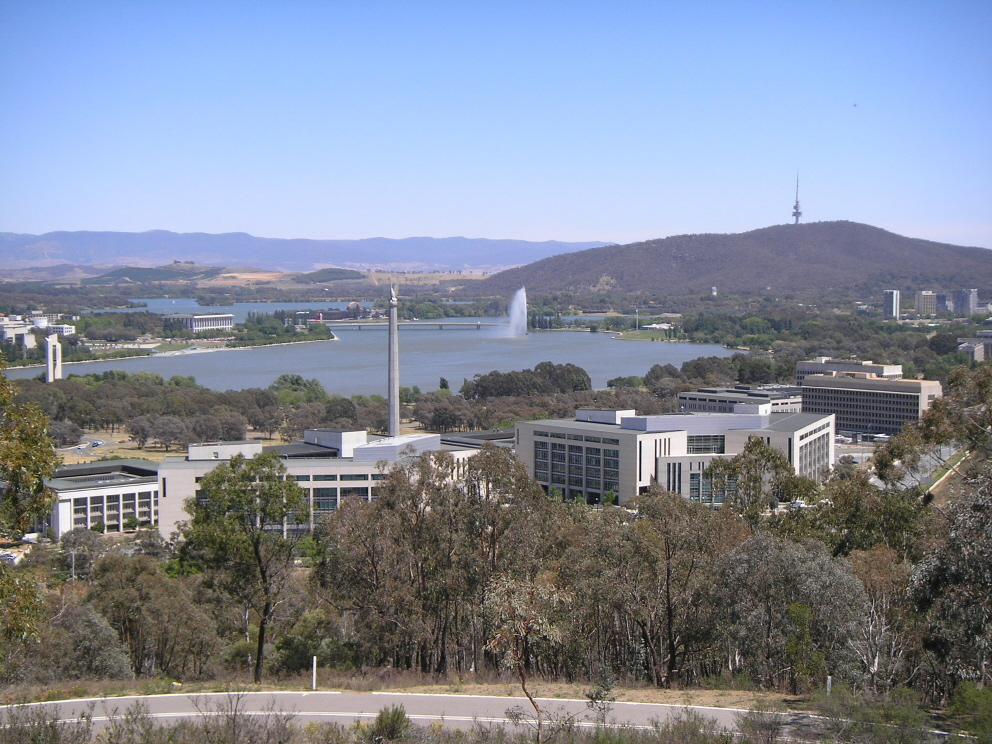
- View of Canberra from Mount Pleasant, with Lake Burley Griffin and Black Mountain Tower from Mount Pleasant. Russell Offices are in the foreground.

Highest point
- Elevation: 663 m (2,175 ft)
- Coordinates: 35°17′56″S 149°09′29″E

Geography
- Location within Australian Capital Territory
- Location: Australian Capital Territory, Australia

Mount Pleasant is a hill with an elevation of 663 metres (2,175 ft) AHD that is located in the north-eastern suburbs of Canberra in the Australian Capital Territory, Australia. The hill overlooks the Australian Defence Force Academy and the Royal Military College at Duntroon. On the top of the hill is a memorial to all ranks of the Royal Regiment of Australian Artillery. The summit can be accessed by car using General Bridges Drive and is open to the public during daylight hours.

== Features ==
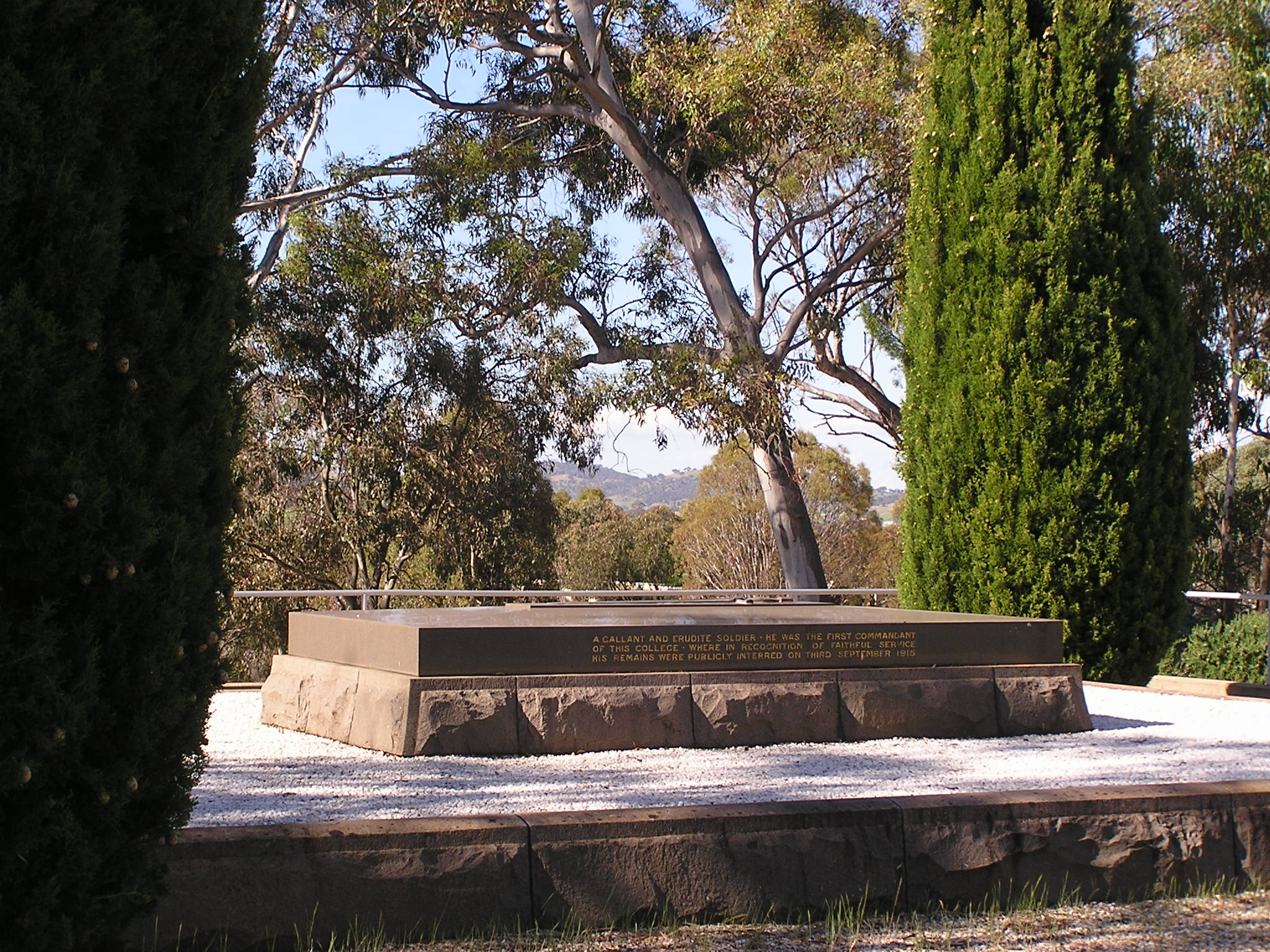
General Bridges grave: the consultant designer and architect was Walter Burley Griffin.

Mount Pleasant is a gun saluting station from which Australia's Federation Guard provides 21-gun salutes on ceremonial occasions.

On the slopes of the hill overlooking the college is the grave of William Throsby Bridges, the first commandant of the college and one of only two Australian World War I soldiers killed in action or died of wounds who was buried in Australia. The other is The Unknown Soldier, disinterred from a French grave and buried at the Australian War Memorial in 1991. Bridges was the commander of the 1st Australian Division at Gallipoli.

While touring the lines on 15 May 1915, Bridges was shot through the femoral artery by a Turkish sniper. Dragged to safety he was evacuated to the hospital ship Gascon where he died the following day. His body was returned to Melbourne where he received a state funeral. He was buried on 3 September 1915, on the slopes of Mount Pleasant. The grave was designed by Walter Burley Griffin, the designer of Canberra. It is the only permanent structure designed by Griffin ever built in Canberra. The memorial stone on the grave was unveiled in 1920.

== See also ==
- Australian War Memorial
