= Australian Defence Force Academy =

Military academy in Canberra tertiary education provided by UNSW

- Motto: To Lead, To Excel
- Type: Commonwealth military academy
- Established: 1986; 40 years ago
- Affiliations: Australian Defence Force
- Academic affiliations: University of New South Wales (UNSW)
- Commandant: Brigadier Troy Francis, CSC
- Academic staff: ~ 150 Defence; ~ 380 University
- Undergraduates: ~ 950
- Postgraduates: ~ 1300
- Location: Campbell, Canberra, ACT, Australia; 35°17′38″S 149°09′50″E
- Campus: Mount Pleasant, Campbell
- Website: www.adfcareers.gov.au/study-and-trades/get-a-degree/ADFA

The Australian Defence Force Academy (ADFA) is a tri-service military academy that provides military and academic education for junior officers of the Australian Defence Force in the Royal Australian Navy (RAN), Australian Army and Royal Australian Air Force (RAAF) as well as international trainee officers from a variety of countries. In 2016, the academy began accepting civilian students in its undergraduate courses.

Tertiary education is provided by the University of New South Wales' Canberra campus, known as UNSW Canberra at ADFA, which is the awarding body for ADFA qualifications. Apart from educating future leaders of the Australian Defence Force, UNSW Canberra also provides postgraduate programs and short courses both to Department of Defence personnel and the general public.

The stated purpose of ADFA is "to serve Australia by providing the Australian Defence Force (ADF) with tertiary graduates who have the attributes, intellect and skills required of an officer".

ADFA is located in the suburb of Campbell, Canberra, Australian Capital Territory, near the Australian Government district of Russell. It is situated next to Mount Pleasant, which gives some parts of ADFA a view over the rest of Canberra. ADFA is also adjacent to the Australian Army military academy, the Royal Military College, Duntroon.

Junior officers who attend the Australian Defence Force Academy hold the rank of Midshipman (MIDN) in the Royal Australian Navy, Officer Cadet (OCDT) in the Australian Army or Officer Cadet (OFFCDT) in the Royal Australian Air Force.

== History ==
=== Establishment ===
After World War II, each of the three Armed Services adopted, as policy, that the educational standards should be raised for officers in training.

In 1967, an agreement was reached between the Department of Defence and the University of New South Wales, under which they would co-operate to develop the Royal Military College ('RMC' or 'Duntroon') into a degree-level institution. To that end, the university established the Faculty of Military Studies at RMC to conduct courses leading to the award of the university's degrees in arts, science and engineering.

Also in 1967, the University of New South Wales entered into an association with the RAN College enabling it to present approved courses. Subsequently, first year courses for certain University programs in arts, science and engineering were introduced. Successful cadets were also sponsored by the Navy to then complete bachelor's degrees on the university's main campus.

Concurrent with the developments at the RAN College and RMC, from 1967 to 1970, Sir Leslie H. Martin chaired the Commonwealth Government's Tertiary Education (Services' Cadet Colleges) Committee into the feasibility of setting up a college for the joint education of officer cadets of the three Armed Services.

Investigations on a wider scale followed, with the result that in 1974 the Whitlam Labor Government announced its intention to establish a single tertiary institution for the Defence Force. In 1977, the Commonwealth Government formally established the Australian Defence Force Academy as a Joint Service Unit under Section 32c of the Defence Act 1903. The Chief of the Defence Force, Air Chief Marshal Sir Neville McNamara, simultaneously announced the appointment of Rear Admiral Peter Sinclair, Royal Australian Navy as first Commandant of Academy. Construction did not begin on the site until 1981. In February 1984, the University of New South Wales announced the appointment of Professor Geoff Wilson as Rector of the University College. In September 1985 an Interim Academy Council ceased its functions and the Australian Defence Force Academy Council held its inaugural meeting, under the Chairmanship of Sir Edward Woodward.

In 1986, ADFA opened and began providing military and tertiary academic education for midshipmen and officer cadets. In late 2003, the Department of Defence entered into another agreement with the University of New South Wales, also providing for the operation of University College at ADFA.

In 2015, a $98 million redevelopment was completed.

=== Criticism, review and reform of ADFA ===
A parliamentary inquiry conducted by the Joint Standing Committee on Public Works in 1979 opposed the creation of the planned Defence Force Academy and suggested that each individual service maintain oversight of academic training of its officers. The committee's chair Mel Bungey stated the "there was no clear evidence [...] that the training of cadets of all Services in a common establishment would of itself provide any improvement in the quality of officers".

Over its history ADFA has been criticised for its cost of operation and for instances of cadet misbehaviour (including bastardisation). In 1998, the Director of the Defence Equity Organisation, Bronwen Grey, led a review into ADFA's policies and practices to deal with sexual harassment and sexual offences. The Grey Review led to fundamental structural and cultural changes at ADFA, including abolition of a cadet rank hierarchy and equity and diversity training for cadets and staff. Notwithstanding these improvements, the national publicity associated with the review caused considerable damage to the academy's reputation.

In July 2006, LCDR Robyn Fahy – the first woman to graduate from ADFA and the dux of her year – was awarded an undisclosed amount in compensation for abuses suffered during her service in the ADF, including instances of physical and verbal abuse suffered at ADFA. ADFA attracted further criticism from the Canberra gay and lesbian community after its then commandant issued an order preventing Academy personnel from frequenting the Cube nightclub, a gay and lesbian venue. The order was purportedly in response to instances of violence at the club, including one in which a patron was stabbed; the ban has since been lifted.

In April 2011, it was alleged a male cadet used Skype to stream video of consensual sex with a female cadet to several other cadets at ADFA. The allegation achieved national media attention, and was subject to civil proceedings in the ACT courts. Aside from this court action, the incident triggered several other inquiries, investigations and reviews into ADFA. These included an inquiry led by Mr Andrew Kirkham QC into ADFA's management of the incident, and a 2011 review led by Elizabeth Broderick, national Sex Discrimination Commissioner, into the treatment of women at ADFA. The Broderick Review found that ADFA was a greatly improved institution since the 1990s, and that the extreme cultural concerns identified by Bronwen Grey in 1998 were no longer apparent. Notwithstanding this general finding, the review found there were still structural and cultural deficiencies at ADFA which contributed to widespread, low-level sexual harassment. This review led to a second tranche of major reform at ADFA, which is still underway.

In November 2014, the Australian Government's Defence Abuse Response Taskforce recommended that a royal commission be conducted to consider all allegations of abuse at ADFA since its establishment in 1986.

=== Open day ===
ADFA has a yearly open day with displays of military hardware, demonstrations and flypasts. Due to the COVID-19 pandemic, in 2020 the physical open day was replaced by an on-line event. The 2026 open day is scheduled for Saturday 15 August.

== Commandants ==
The following officers have served as commandants of the Academy:

- Rear Admiral Peter Sinclair, AO (1984–1986)
- Major General Peter Day, AO (1986–1990)
- Air Vice-Marshal Richard Bomball, AO, AFC (1990–1993)
- Rear Admiral Anthony Carwardine, AO (1993–1995)
- Major General Frank Hickling, AO, CSC (1995–1996)
- Air Vice-Marshal Gary Beck, AO (1996–1997)
- Commodore Brian Adams, AM (1998–2000)
- Air Commodore Julie Hammer, CSC (2001–2003)
- Commodore James Goldrick, AM, CSC (2003–2006)
- Brigadier Brian Dawson, AM, CSC (2006–2007)
- Brigadier Wayne Goodman, AM (2008–2009)
- Air Commodore Margaret Staib, AM, CSC (2009)
- Commodore Bruce Kafer, AM, CSC (2009–2013)
- Air Commodore Alan Clements, CSC (2013–2016)
- Brigadier Cheryl Pearce, AM (2017–2018)
- Commodore Peter Leavy, CSM (2019–2021)
- Air Commodore Jules Adams (2022–2024)
- Brigadier Troy Francis (2025–present)

== Academic education ==
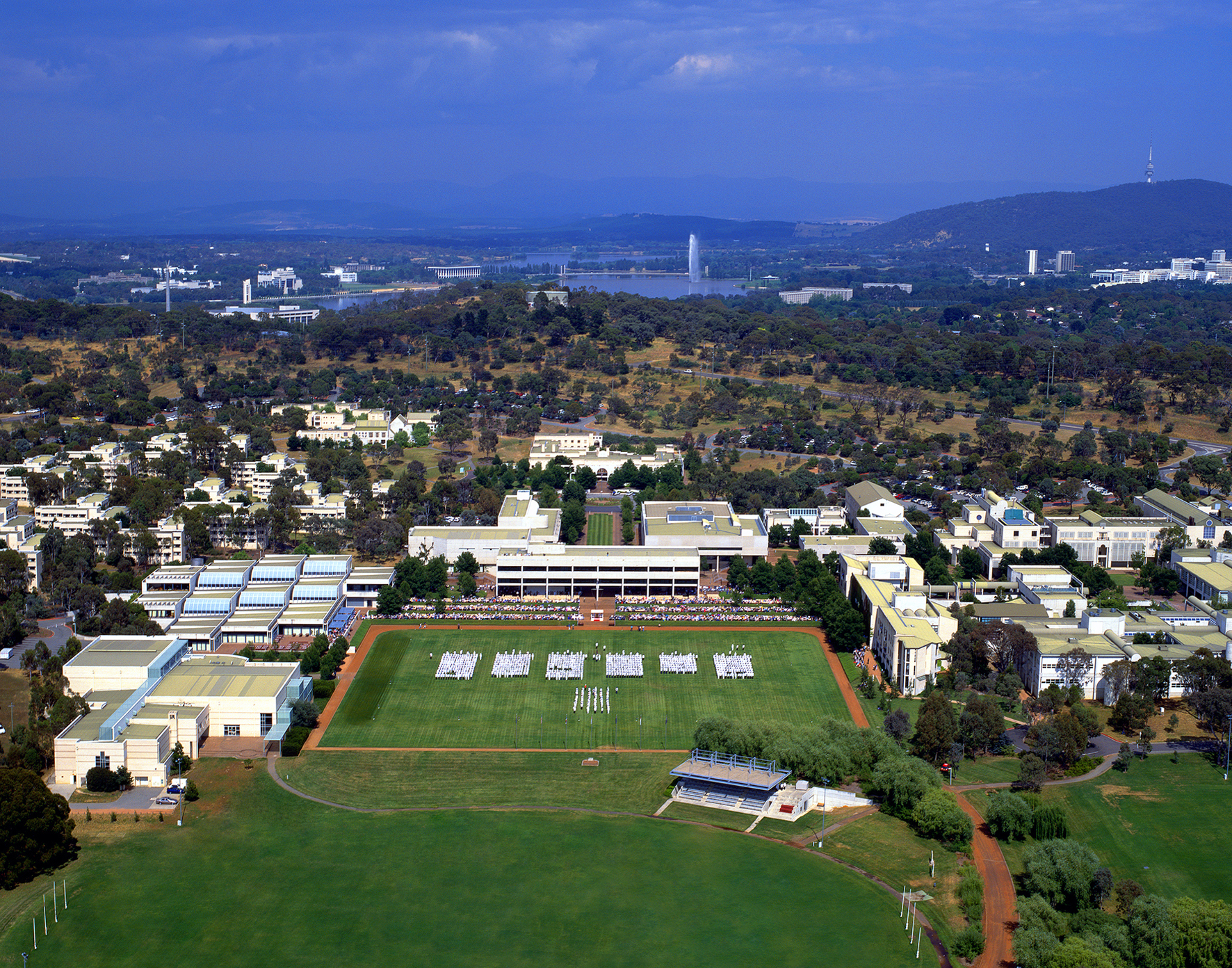
Aerial view of the ADFA campus

ADFA's academic education is run by the University of New South Wales, and it offers awards at the Diploma, Associate Diploma, Bachelor's Degree, Master's Degree, and Doctorate levels.

Under its agreement with the Department of Defence, the University of New South Wales (UNSW) provides Midshipmen (RAN) and Officer Cadets (ARA and RAAF) with a tertiary education at its University College campus (UNSW@ADFA), which is located on academy grounds.

=== Degrees and awards ===
Midshipmen, officer cadets and civilians undertake three- and four-year undergraduate degrees at ADFA. Currently, undergraduate degrees include:

- Bachelor of Arts
- Bachelor of Science
- Bachelor of Business
- Bachelor of Computing and Cyber Security
- Bachelor of Engineering with Honours (Aeronautical, Civil, Electrical, Mechanical and Naval Architecture)
- Bachelor of Technology (Aeronautical and Aviation)

Those who do well academically and militarily have the possibility to return to ADFA for one year in order to do honours, as long as their respective services authorise further training. In addition to honours in Engineering, UNSW@ADFA offers honours in arts, sciences, business, and information technology.

Post-graduate degree studies are offered for senior members of the ADF, senior public servants, and other civilians. Increasingly, distance-education units are being offered for service members not based in Canberra.

=== Entrance requirements ===
Entry requires candidates to complete a separate military and academic application: candidates must be successful in both to receive an appointment to ADFA. UNSW and ADF have invested considerable effort in maintaining a high standard of academic performance. "83 per cent of the more than 600 students enrolled in the three-year course had tertiary entrance scores higher than 80 per cent, placing them among the nation's best academic performers".

=== Student performance ===
"ADFA's GTS – Good Teaching Scale – is 54, and nearly triple the Group of Eight median of 20.53. It's SPR – Student Progress Rate, which calculates the ratio of the load passed to total course load – is 93.7, compared with the Go8 median of 88. Its OSI – Overall Satisfaction Index – is 72, [compared to] the Go8 median of 39.1."

== Military training ==
=== Year One Familiarisation Training (YOFT) ===
On arrival at ADFA, new Officer Cadets and Midshipmen undertake a five-week phase of training known as Year One Familiarisation Training (YOFT). Year One Familiarisation Training encompasses weapon training, physical training, first aid, drill, academic enrollments and Professional Military Education (PME). The training culminates with 'Leadership Challenge One' (LCI), which is a 24hr arduous activity. YOFT ends with the return of second- and third-year cadets to ADFA, and the conduct of the Chief of the Defence Force (CDF) Parade in late February/early March.

=== Joint Military Education Training (JMET) ===
During academic sessions, ADFA provides basic military training to Midshipmen and Officer Cadets through the Joint Military Education Training (JMET) program. The JMET program encompasses Character, Leadership and Ethics (CLE), Joint Professional Military Education (JPME), Capability and Technology and Physical Training (PT). The JMET program will see Officer Cadets and Midshipmen complete Leadership Challenge Two (LCII) in second year, and culminate with Leadership Challenge Three (LCIII) in third year. LCIII involves Officer Cadets and Midshipmen conducting a stability operation at the section level. They will conduct section leads involving scenarios that contain CBRN threats, urban operations, search and rescue, observation posts, key leadership engagements and riot control. Officer Cadets and Midshipmen will also find themselves in hostilities against special forces elements, separatist militia and criminal gangs. LCIII has been modified to reflect real scenarios based on training staff's lived experience in recent conflicts such as East Timor, Iraq and Afghanistan.

=== Single Service Training (SST) ===
At the end of each academic session, Midshipmen and Officer Cadets move to their respective single service colleges for Single Service Training (SST). Such training prepares them to be officers in the ADF. Army Officer Cadets continue this training for another 12 months after leaving ADFA at the Royal Military College, Duntroon (RMC-D), to later be commissioned as Lieutenants. Army will complete eight battle blocks. By the end of their first year, Army OCDTs are expected to be qualified as private soldiers, with recent cohorts undertaking the reservist recruit course at 1RTB Kapooka. By the end of Third year, OCDTs are qualified as section commanders. In contrast, Air Force Officer Cadets complete 3 Phases of SSTs whilst Midshipmen, who have already completed 12 months of training in the Navy, may not be required to train in these periods.

== Academy life ==
The ADFA year is split into two academic sessions, semesters, during which academic education is carried out. However, a variety of other activities take place in and around these sessions. Before Session 1, 'first years' undertake YOFT whilst second and third years are trained on their respective SST blocks. After Session 1, a two-week holiday period begins, though first years go on their first SST block. Academics recommence after this period with the start of Session 2. At the end of Session 2, all years commence their final SST block for the year, and shortly after this, third years graduate, and this is formally recognised during the 'Grad' parade.

At ADFA, officers and senior NCOs lead the daily lives of the cadets. Since a cadet chain of command is absent (see Grey Review above), a key opportunity to gain leadership experience is by captaining one of the varsity or club sports teams.

=== Timetable ===
ADFA runs on standard military time and generally follows the timetable:

- 0600 to 0700 – Reveille and Breakfast
- 0700 to 1000 – Joint Military Education or PT
- 1000 to 1800 – Academic classes (University timetable dependent)
- 1800 to 1930 – Sports training (mandatory for First Years)

=== Sports ===
ADFA is well known within both the ADF and the Canberra local region for its sports programme. While not compulsory, it is strongly encouraged that each and every OCDT/OFFCDT and MIDN takes up at least one sport each year to develop their team, leadership and social skills. The sports available at ADFA include both ‘inter-range’ sports that are played against other civilian and ADF teams, and Academy sports that are just competed within the academy itself. Cadets are permitted to play one grade A sport and up to two grade B sports from the following non-exclusive list:

Grade A

- Association Football (Soccer – including a women's team)
- Australian Rules Football (including a women's team)
- Rugby League (competing in the New South Wales Tertiary Student Rugby League competition)
- Rugby Union (including a women's team)

Grade B

- Basketball
- Cricket
- Cycling
- Marathon and Distance Running (MADR)
- Hockey
- Netball
- Rowing See also Disher Challenge Cup.
- Dragon Boating
- Sailing
- Squash
- Tennis
- Touch Football
- Triathlon
- Volleyball
- Water Polo

=== Voluntary extra-curricular clubs ===
"ADFA offers a range of sporting and voluntary extra-curricular clubs (VECCs) for cadets, encouraging them to compete against and become involved with local and interstate organisations."

VECCs currently offered at ADFA include:

- Bands and Musical opportunities – The Australian Defence Force Academy Band (ADFA Band) is the official musical unit of the Australian Defence Force Academy. The band is composed of smaller ensembles (of which the pipe band and the marching band are the largest) who perform during ceremonies such as ANZAC Day and ADFA Graduation Day.
- Community Service VECC (CSV)
- ADFA Debating Society (ADS)
- FOCUS (Fellowship of Christian University Students)
- Military Shooting VECC (MSV)
- Musical Production VECC (The ADFA Performing Arts Company)
- Precision Drill Team – A platoon of ADFA with Lee Enfield Rifles. Since its establishment, the unit has performed at events such as the Brisbane Festival and the Sydney International Military Tattoo.
- FSAE (Academy Racing – Formula SAE Car)
- Web Design Group
- Lawn Bowls
- Martial Arts – Offers training in both Taekwondo and Brazilian Jiu Jitsu.
- Mountaineering
- Cross Fit
- Fencing
- Photography Club
- CyberSec

Others not mentioned on the ADFA VECCs webpage include:

- Aviation Interest Group
- Maritime Interest Group
- ADFA 4X4 VECC
- DJ VECC
- ADFA Focus
- ADFA Anglers Fishing VECC
- Mandatory Monday Association

=== Facilities ===
Most facilities at ADFA were constructed in the early 1980s, including:

- Accommodation blocks, commonly known as 'divisions', or 'lines'.
- An Indoor Sports Centre, with pool (and overhead obstacle course), weights gym, cardio room, boxercise room, squash courts and a basketball court.
- Military and Academic lecture theatres.
- One of two cyber battle boards in Australia
- A Junior ranks mess, Senior NCOs mess, Officers mess and the Academy Cadets Mess (which is the largest military mess in the southern hemisphere).
- Sporting facilities, including a football oval, rugby field, tennis courts, volleyball courts, netball courts, soccer fields, cross-country course and a boat shed.
- ADFA also has access to a Weapons Training Simulation System.
- ADFA also has the lowest student to academic staff ratio of any university in Australia at 9:1

== Structure ==
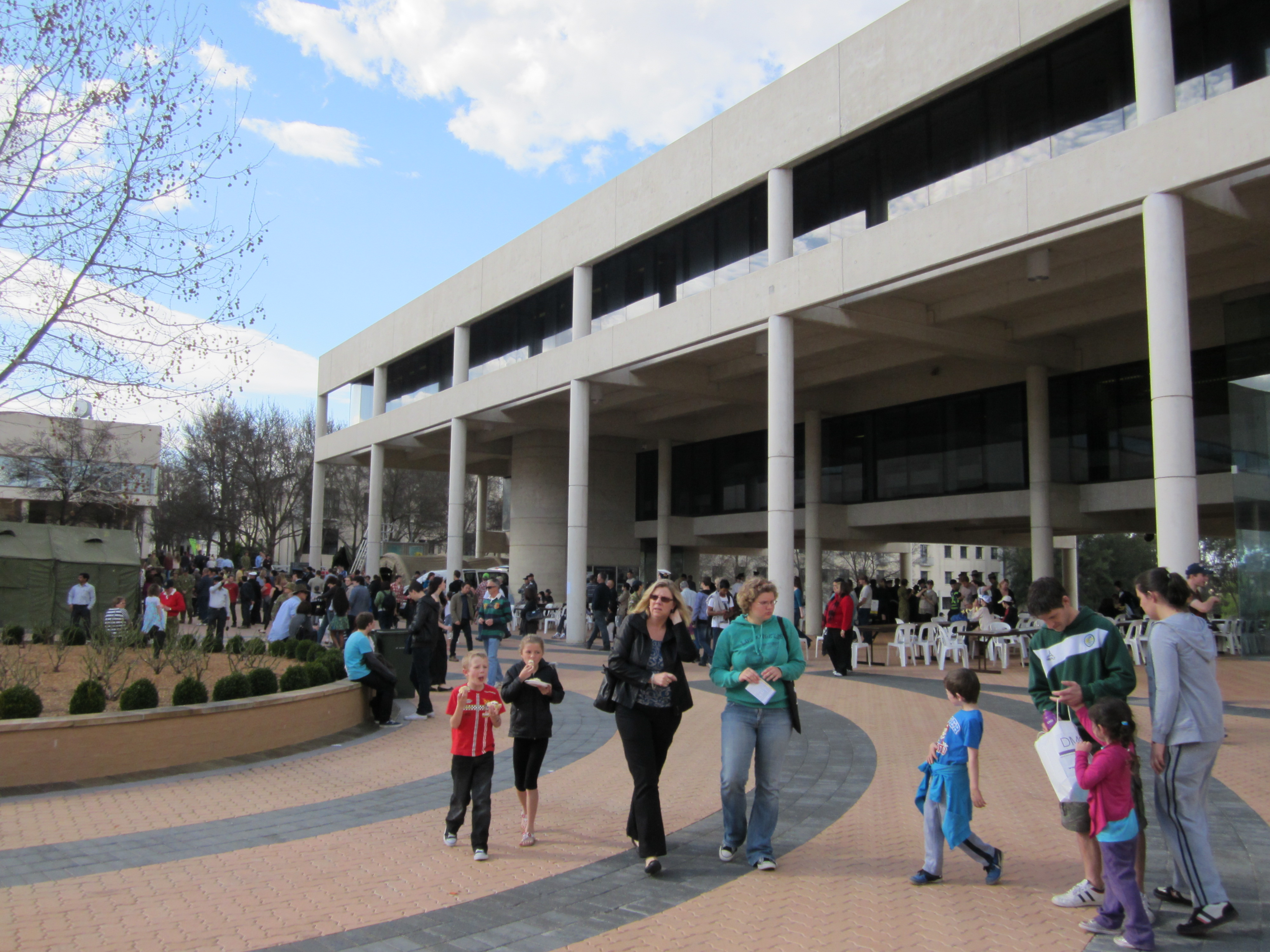
People at the 2011 Australian Defence Force Academy open day

=== UNSW Canberra at ADFA ===
UNSW Canberra at ADFA is managed for UNSW by a Rector. Under the Rector are the heads of schools, who manage their respective schools. UNSW Canberra at ADFA schools were restructured from twelve discipline-based schools to four multi-disciplinary Schools as of 1 January 2012. These are:

- School of Engineering and Information Technology
- School of Business
- School of Humanities and Social Sciences
- School of Physical, Environmental and Mathematical Sciences

=== ADFA ===
As of January 2001, ADFA has been part of the Australian Defence College (ADC) command structure, which is also responsible for the Australian Command and Staff College (ACSC) and the Centre for Defence and Strategic Studies (CDSS).

The Commandant of ADFA is appointed by the Australian Defence Force for a period of three years. Command of ADFA is based upon a three-year rotation between the three services and is held by a commodore, brigadier, or air commodore.

==== Temporary command arrangements in 2011 ====
As a result of the 'Skype incident' in April 2011, the Commandant of ADFA – Commodore Bruce Kafer – was temporarily stood down from duty. A major inquiry into ADFA's management of the incident was undertaken by Andrew Kirkham QC, and during this period several officers filled the role of Acting Commandant; Colonel Paul Petersen, Group Captain 'Loch' Mitchell and Rear Admiral James Goldrick. The findings of the Kirkham Inquiry eventually cleared the way for Commodore Kafer to be reinstated as Commandant in March 2012.

==== Organisation ====
ADFA is based on an amalgamation of all three services, and the organisation of the cadet side of the academy reflects this. Divisions are accommodated in accommodation blocks (commonly known as 'lines' or 'divs') consisting of five sections (Alpha, Bravo, Charlie, Delta, Echo, Foxtrot) with a sixth section (Omega) normally reserved for divisional staff and storage. Each section has two corridors (Half-sections) with four rooms and shared toilet, bathroom and laundry facilities.

There are six squadrons, Alpha, Bravo, Charlie, Delta, Echo, and Foxtrot, with up to four divisions in each squadron. Each division has either first- and third-years or second- and third-years, and each squadron has all three-year levels. Annually, the squadrons compete against each other in a range of competitions being:

- Cross Country
- Swimming Carnival
- Debating
- Fitness Excellence
- Military Skills
- Shooting Competition
- Academics

The squadron who achieves the best results across all activities are awarded the Lancaster Shield, and become the CDF squadron for the following year. CDF squadron members receive minor benefits as recognition of their hard work and efforts in the previous year. Alpha Squadron has been the CDF Squadron for the past four years.

Advanced students (commissioned officers and 4th year engineering students) are part of Advanced Student divisions. Advanced students may live in the Officers' Mess, other on base accommodation or off base. Prior to 2006 the years were arranged into separate squadrons, first year squadrons were tri service with cadets spending their final two years in single service squadrons. In 2010 this changed to the current system in order to increase cadet interyear interaction.

The Squadron chain of command is as follows:

Each division has a Divisional SNCO (Petty Officer/Sergeant) and Divisional Officer (Lieutenant RAN/Army Captain/RAAF Flight Lieutenant).
Each squadron has a Squadron Sergeant Major (SSM) (Chief Petty Officer/Warrant Officer Class 2 (WO2)/Flight Sergeant) and an Officer Commanding (OC) (Lieutenant Commander/Major/Squadron Leader).

Within each division a Midshipman/Officer Cadet is appointed as the Divisional Duty Officer (DDO) on a weekly or fortnightly basis. The DDO is responsible for the general administration of the division, its cleanliness, and conducting the division's movements to and from military commitments. In addition, each section has a section leader appointed who is responsible for the section duties and assists the DDO. Permanent positions (referred to as Individual Leadership Appointments (ILA)) are also available, primarily for third year Midshipman and Officer Cadets. There are 5 unit-level yearly positions which are: Academy Cadet Captain, Academy Cadet Executive Officer, Chief of Staff, President of the Mess Committee and Deputy President of the Mess Committee. There are also similar roles at the squadron and division levels.

== See also ==
- Australian Defence College
- Royal Australian Naval College
- Officer Cadet School, Portsea
- Officer Training Unit, Scheyville
- Royal Military College, Duntroon

Other nations

- Royal Military Academy Sandhurst
- Royal Military College of Canada
- United States Military Academy at West Point
- United States Naval Academy at Annapolis
- United States Air Force Academy
- Indonesian Army Command and General Staff College
- Staff college
