= HMS Carron =

Five vessels of the Royal Navy have been named HMS Carron:

- HMS Carron (1813), a 20-gun Cyrus-class sixth-rate post ship built in 1813 and wrecked in 1820.
- HMS Carron (1827), a wooden paddle steamer launched in 1827, hulked in 1846, sold in 1877, and broken up in 1885.
- HMS Carron (1855), a mortar vessel launched in April 1855, renamed HMS MV17 in September 1855, hulked in 1866, and broken up in 1884.
- HMS Carron (R30), a C-class destroyer launched in 1944, paid off in 1963, and broken up in 1967.
- HMS Carron (M2004), a minehunter launched in 1983 and sold to Bangladesh in 1994.
