= Henry Hauenstein =

Australian rower (1881–1940)

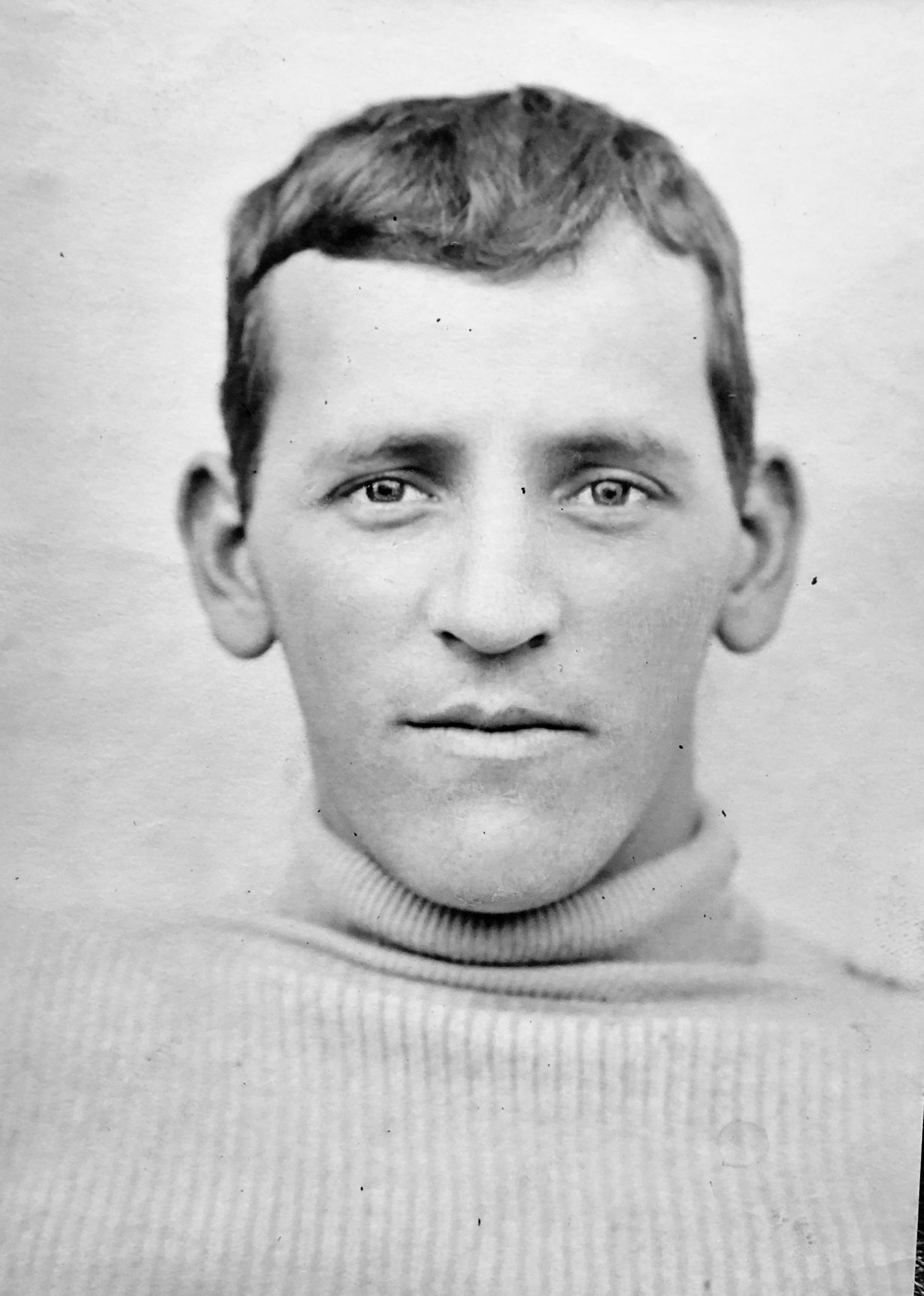
- Hauenstein 1910

Personal information
- Nationality: Australian
- Born: 3 May 1881
- Died: 6 December 1940 (aged 59) Sydney, Australia

Sport
- Sport: Rowing
- Club: Leichhardt Rowing Club

Achievements and titles
- Olympic finals: Stockholm 1912
- National finals: Interstate C'ship M8+ 1907-11

Henry Denis Hauenstein, MM (3 May 1881 – 6 December 1940) was an Australian national representative rower and a World War I infantry officer. He was a three-time Australian national champion rower who competed for Australasia at the 1912 Summer Olympics in the men's eight. He was a member of the Australian men's selection eight which won the Grand Challenge Cup at the Henley Royal Regatta of 1912. He saw active service on the Western Front where he won the Military Medal and was a member of the AIF crew which at war's end, won at the 1919 Peace Regatta and brought the King's Cup to Australia.

== Early life ==
Hauenstein was the eldest of six children born to Carl Herman Hauenstein, a Swiss German immigrant who came to Australia in 1881, married Elizabeth Annabelle Field and settled in Barmedman in New South Wales. Carl failed in his attempt at gold prospecting, then worked as a carpenter and coach driver whilst struggling to farm a 319-acre dry landholding. The family relocated to the inner-city Sydney suburb of Leichhardt. Harry and his brothers Paddy and William took up rowing and joined the Leichhardt Rowing Club.

As a young man Harry took a boatbuilding apprenticeship with a firm in East Balmain and then in 1903 he joined the New South Wales Police Force being gazetted as a probationary constable in 1904 and becoming a full constable in 1905.

== Rowing career ==
Hauenstein became the Leichhardt club's first eight-oared state representative, rowing in the New South Wales men's eight at the Interstate Regatta for five consecutive years from 1907 to 1911. Those New South Wales crews were victorious in 1908, 1910 and 1911. Hauenstein also raced at one point for the Balmain Rowing Club and then following his 1912 national selection joined the Sydney Rowing Club with the entire Australian eight so that they could enter and race at the Henley Royal Regatta as a club entrant.

In 1912 he was a member of the Australian men's eight which racing as a Sydney Rowing Club entrant, won the Grand Challenge Cup on the River Thames at the Henley Royal Regatta. The eight then moved to Stockholm for the 1912 Summer Olympics, where after beating a Swedish eight in the first round they were beaten by a Great British crew in round two – the same Leander eight they had beaten at Henley a few weeks earlier.

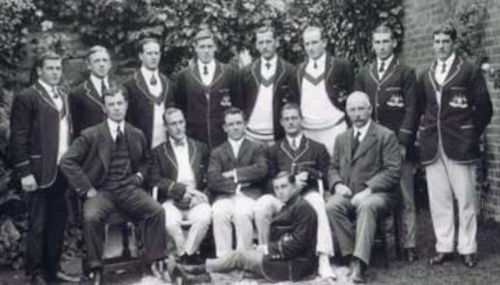
Hauenstein (backrow 4th from right) with the 1912 Aust Olympic VIII, incl reserves & selectors

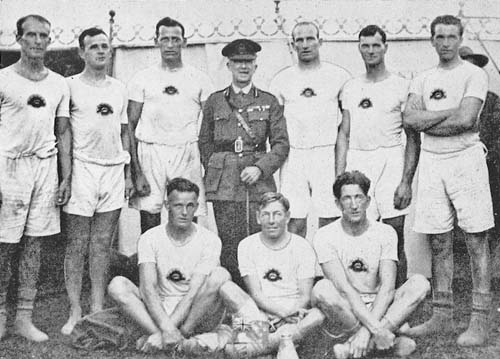
Hauenstein standing left of officer with the AIF #1 VIII at 1919 Henley Peace Regatta

== Military service ==
In 1915, he enlisted with the AIF 2nd Bttn in their 12th reinforcement. His unit embarked on HMAT A7 Medic in January 1916. After arriving in Alexandria in March 1916, Hauenstein transferred to the 1st Pioneer Battalion where his carpentry skills learned in boatbuilding were useful. The Pioneer Battn. fought as infantry but their primary job was construction. He saw service on the Western Front at Pozieres. He was awarded the Military Medal for bravery at Mouquet Farm.

The citation read:

At Pozieres, France 15th to 22nd August 1916 Cpl Hauenstein was engaged in the frontline construction in the direction of Ferme Mouquet having one night's sleep only. He was constantly under fire and by his courage and example greatly helped the work. Cpl Hauenstein is a man of great physical strength and repeatedly left the trenches going to shell craters and carrying in wounded men under fire when but for this they must have remained. He at different times brought in ten men in this manner each under very hazardous conditions.

— The London Gazette, September 1916

By war's end Hauenstein had risen to the rank of Lieutenant. He rowed at the 1919 Peace Regatta at Henley-on-Thames in the Australian Imperial Force #1 eight which won the King's Cup. That cup became the trophy for the Australian championship men's eight event contested annually at the Australian Interstate Regatta.

== Civilian life ==
After the war Hauenstein rejoined his wife Eva and settled in the inner-city Sydney suburb of Macdonaldtown. He worked as a contracting lift mechanic. He was admitted to the Prince of Wales Hospital in Sydney on 5 December 1940 and died from stomach cancer the next day.
