= Arthur Scott (rower) =

Australian rower

Personal information
- Nationality: Australian
- Born: 13 February 1887 Dry Creek, South Australia
- Died: 26 July 1966 (aged 79) Murray Bridge, South Australia

Sport
- Sport: Rowing
- Club: Murray Bridge Rowing Club

Achievements and titles
- National finals: King's Cup 1913-14, 1920-26

Arthur Valentine Scott (13 February 1887 – 26 July 1966) was a South Australian rower and an AIF artilleryman who saw active service on the Western Front in World War II. He was a four-time national champion who represented Australia at the 1924 Summer Olympics in the men's eight rowing crew. He was a member of the AIF #1 eight which won at the 1919 Henley Peace Regatta and brought the King's Cup to Australia.

== Pre-war rowing ==
Both pre and post-war, Scott was employed as a fireman with the South Australian Railways. Scott's senior rowing was from the Murray Bridge Rowing Club. He, along with the rest of the champion Murray Bridge senior men's eight, was selected in South Australian state eights to contest the Australian men's interstate eights title at the Interstate Regattas of 1913 and 1914. They won the national title in 1913 and placed second in 1914.

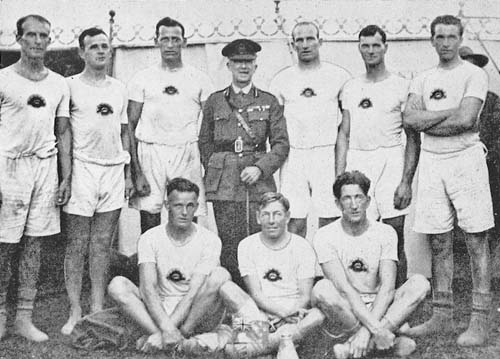
Scott standing 2nd from right with the AIF #1 VIII at 1919 Henley Peace Regatta

== War service ==
Scott enlisted in the AIF aged 28 in August 1915. He joined the 27th Bttn. in their 8th reinforcement and embarked from Adelaide on HMAT A30 Borda in January 1916. On the Western Front he served initially as a Gunner with the 10th Field Artillery. He was wounded in action at Pozieres during the height of fighting on 24 July 1916 and evacuated to hospital at Etaples. He had been promoted to Lance Corporal and then acting Sergeant before being demoted to Corporal in 1917. In September 1917 he was transferred to the 11th Field Artillery. At Agincourt in May 1918 he refused an order to go up the line, was court-martialled, demoted to Gunner and sentenced to a year in military prison.

At war's end Scott rowed at the 1919 Peace Regatta at Henley-on-Thames in the Australian Imperial Force (AIF) crew which won the King's Cup which in time, became the trophy for the men's eight event contested annually at the Australian Interstate Regatta. Scott was seated in the AIF#2 crew for most of the training period leading up to the July 1919 Peace Regatta. Along with Tom McGill and George Nettam he was one of the final three crew changes made to the AIF #1 eight just ten days before the event. Later that month he again raced in the Australian AIF eight when they competed at the Inter-Allied Regatta on the Seine in Paris. Scott returned to Australia in October 1919 and just three days after disembarkation in Melbourne he raced in and won a Senior Fours event (the Steward's Challenge Cup) at the Henley on Yarra regatta in Melbourne on 25 October 1919.

== Post-war rowing ==
Scott returned to competitive rowing at Murray Bridge. The Murray Bridge Rowing Club men's eight continued as the dominant Australian club eight of the 1920s. They won the South Australian state championship from 1920 to 1923 and in 1921 by a margin of ten lengths. For the four years from 1920 to 1923 they were selected in-toto as the South Australian men's eight to contest the Interstate eights title (by now known as the King's Cup) at the Australian Interstate Regatta. Scott rowed in the four seat of each of those crews and rowed in those South Australian King's Cup victories of 1920, 1922 and 1923.

The South Australian media pushed for Scott's victorious 1920 King's Cup eight to be sent to the 1920 Antwerp Olympics but with the Victorian and New South Wales Rowing Association in control of selections and funding, there wasn't sufficient support for their campaign. By 1924 with South Australia continuing to dominate Australian eights rowing, their claim could not be denied and after winning a test event raced on Port Adelaide in March 1924, Scott and the South Australian crew were selected in-toto to represent Australia as an eight at the 1924 Summer Olympics.

Funding was raised from the Murray Bridge Rowing Club, the South Australian Rowing Association and the general public of South Australia. The crew were nicknamed "the Murray Cods". Unlike the 1912 Olympic eight, the Murray Cods were not invited to race in lead-up at the Henley Royal Regatta and in 2000 Ted Thomas jnr a crew member's son, asserted that this was because the eight was crewed by working-class men other than the stroke Bill Sladden It's undisputed that tour funds were scarce and on arrival in France, the crew had to row their shell 60 km to their training base; that on tour some of the crew busked as musicians to raise pocket money; and that on race day they first rowed their shell 26 miles from their boatshed to the Olympic course. Their equipment was also sub-par as they rowed with their oars turning in out-rigged poppets rather than in swivelling gates as had become the norm by 1924. In the Olympic regatta, with Scott solid in the four seat, the Australian eight finished second behind Italy in their heat, then finished third in the repechage and didn't advance to the final.

Arthur Scott continued on as a first-class oarsman after the Olympics. He rowed at four in the South Australian representative eights in the King's Cup campaigns of 1925 (fourth) and 1926 (second). All told, Scott rowed in nine South Australian King's Cup eights in spite of war interrupting racing for five years in the middle of his career. He maintained an active involvement in rowing right through to his fifties.
